= Derwin James =

American football player (born 1996)

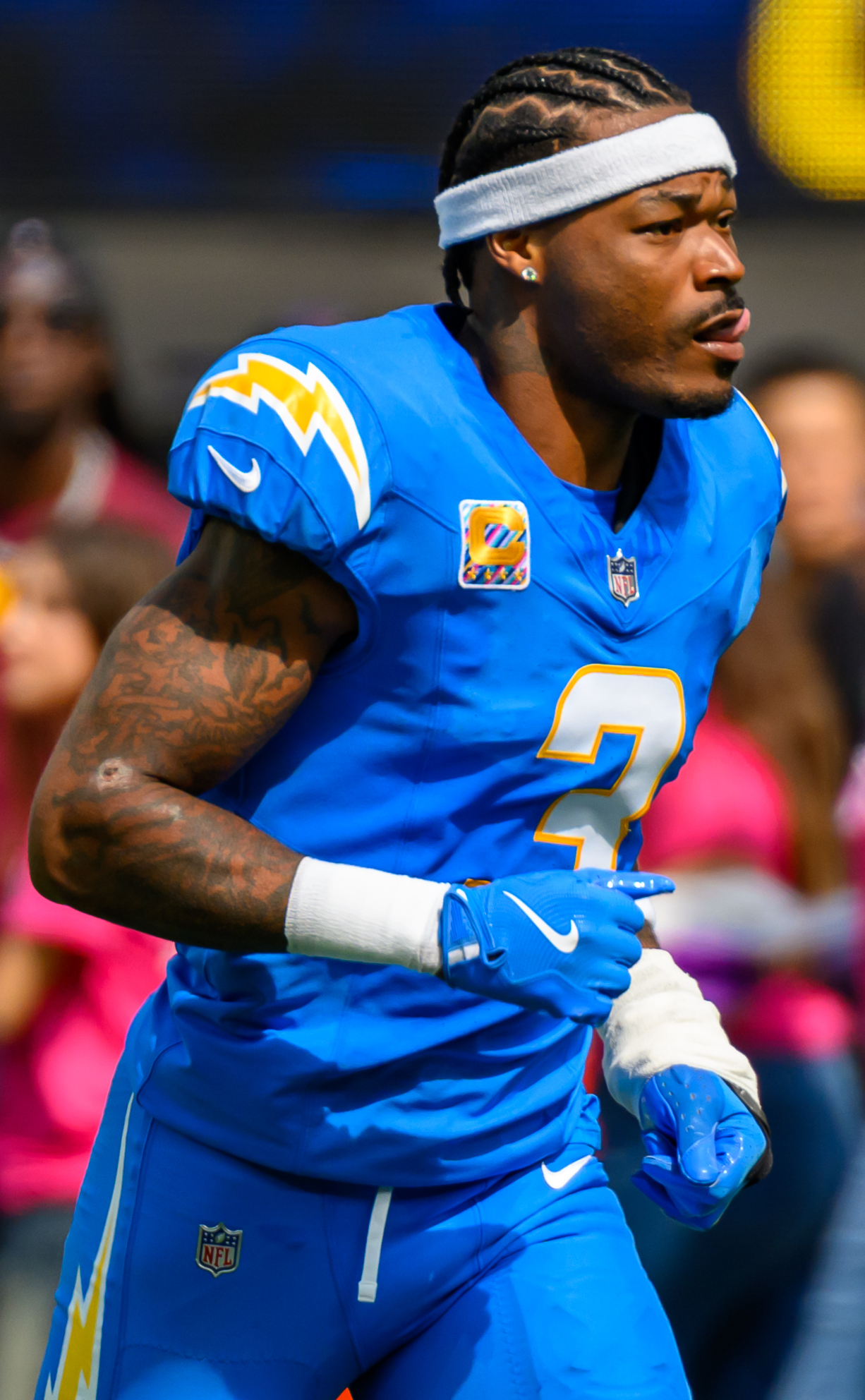
- James with the Los Angeles Chargers in 2025

No. 3 – Los Angeles Chargers
- Position: Safety
- Roster status: Injured reserve

Personal information
- Born: August 3, 1996 (age 30); Haines City, Florida, U.S.
- Listed height: 6 ft 2 in (1.88 m)
- Listed weight: 215 lb (98 kg)

Career information
- High school: Haines City
- College: Florida State (2015–2017)
- NFL draft: 2018: 1st round, 17th overall pick

Career history
- Los Angeles Chargers (2018–present)

Awards and highlights
- 2× First-team All-Pro (2018 (Note: Selected as a safety), 2021); 4× Second-team All-Pro (2018 (Note: Selected as a defensive back), 2022, 2024 (Note: Selected as slot cornerback), 2025 (Note: Selected as slot cornerback)); 5× Pro Bowl (2018, 2021, 2022, 2024, 2025); PFWA All-Rookie Team (2018); First-team All-American (2017); 2× First-team All-ACC (2016, 2017)

Career NFL statistics as of Week 3, 2026
- Total tackles: 705
- Sacks: 19.0
- Forced fumbles: 6
- Fumble recoveries: 3
- Interceptions: 12
- Pass deflections: 47
- Stats at Pro Football Reference

Derwin Alonzo James Jr. (born August 3, 1996) is an American professional football safety for the Los Angeles Chargers of the National Football League (NFL). He played college football for the Florida State Seminoles. He was selected by the Chargers in the first round of the 2018 NFL draft.

== Early life ==
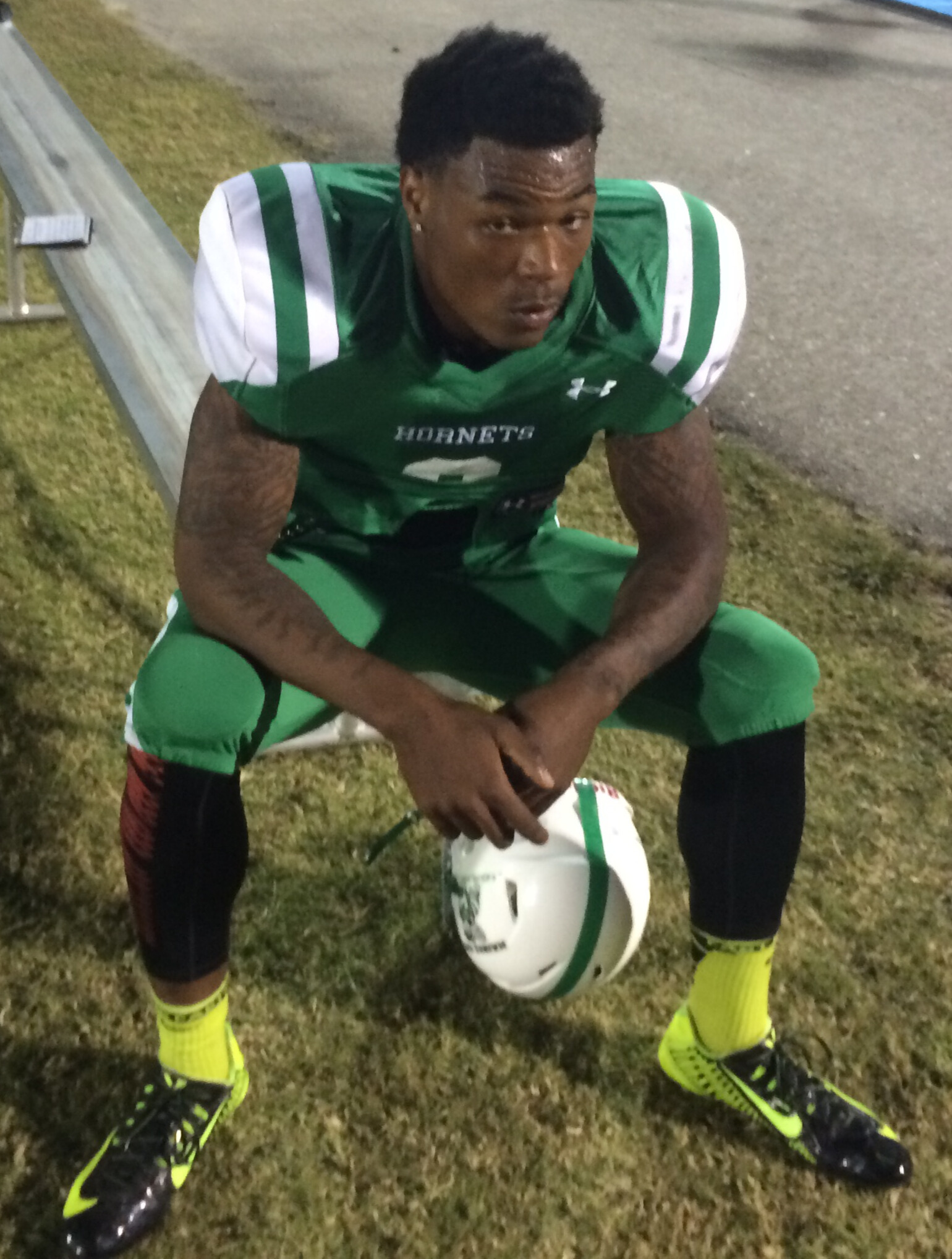
Derwin James during a football game for Haines City High School in 2014.

James attended Auburndale High School in Auburndale, Florida before transferring to his hometown Haines City High School in Haines City, Florida. He was rated by Rivals.com as a five-star recruit and was ranked as the best safety and fifth best player overall in his class. James committed to Florida State University to play college football as a freshman, being offered a scholarship after his freshman year in high school.

== College career ==
James entered his true freshman season at Florida State in 2015 as a backup, but eventually became a starter. As a freshman in 2015, James played in 12 games with 91 tackles, 4.5 sacks, four passes defended, two forced fumbles, and two fumble recoveries.

Before his sophomore season, James was ranked as the third-best second year player, behind only Josh Rosen and Calvin Ridley, by Lance Zierlein. On September 13, 2016, it was revealed that James would undergo knee surgery to repair a lateral meniscus tear and cartilage damage. Recovery time required 5 to 7 weeks. His sophomore year was short-lived, as James only played two games with 11 tackles and an interception. He was granted a redshirt for his following year, and as a redshirted sophomore in 2017, he played in 12 games, finishing with 84 tackles, two interceptions, 11 passes defended, and a sack. On December 7, 2017, James decided to forgo his remaining two years of eligibility and enter the 2018 NFL draft.

== Professional career ==
=== Pre-draft ===
On December 5, 2017, James released a statement through his Instagram account that announced his decision to forgo his remaining eligibility and enter the 2018 NFL Draft. As a result of his decision, he also chose to skip the 2017 Independence Bowl. James attended the NFL Scouting Combine in Indianapolis and completed the majority of combine drills, but opted to skip the short shuttle and three-cone drill. His combine performance impressed scouts and draft experts as he finished third among all defensive backs in the bench press and ninth among all safeties in the 40-yard dash. He also finished fifth among all defensive backs in the broad jump and sixth in the vertical.

External videos
- Derwin James' NFL Combine Workout
- Derwin James runs a 4.47 40-yard dash
- Derwin James hits 40" on his vertical
- NFL Draft Profile: Derwin James

On March 20, 2018, James participated at Florida State's pro day, but opted to stand on his combine numbers and only ran the short shuttle, three-cone drill, and positional drills. James also attended pre-draft visits with the Green Bay Packers and Tampa Bay Buccaneers, but reportedly declined to attend a private workout with the Buccaneers who held the 12th overall pick. At the conclusion of the pre-draft process, James was projected to be a first round pick by NFL draft experts and scouts. He was expected to be one of the first 15 players drafted. He was ranked the top free safety prospect in the draft by DraftScout.com and was ranked the second best safety by NFL analyst Mike Mayock and Sports Illustrated. NFL analyst Mel Kiper Jr. ranked him as the top safety in the draft and fourth overall prospect in his big board.

Pre-draft measurables
Height	Weight	Arm length	Hand span	Wingspan	40-yard dash	10-yard split	20-yard split	20-yard shuttle	Three-cone drill	Vertical jump	Broad jump	Bench press
6 ft 1 3/4 in (1.87 m)	215 lb (98 kg)	33 in (0.84 m)	9 1/2 in (0.24 m)	6 ft 6 5/8 in (2.00 m)	4.47 s	1.50 s	2.59 s	4.34 s	7.34 s	40 in (1.02 m)	11 ft 0 in (3.35 m)	21 reps
All values from NFL Combine/Florida State's Pro Day

External videos
- Chargers draft Derwin James 17th overall
- Derwin James' draft reaction
- James "I've got something to prove!"

"James has great range versus the run, closes in a flash and explodes through ball carriers. He misses the occasional tackle but has the athletic ability and length to make one-on-one plays in space. James is an elite talent who is highly likely to have a better pro career than a college one."

— Todd McShay (ESPN analyst)

=== 2018 season ===
The Los Angeles Chargers selected James in the first round (17th overall) of the 2018 NFL draft. James was the second safety drafted in 2018, behind Alabama safety Minkah Fitzpatrick (11th overall, Miami Dolphins).

On June 1, 2018, the Chargers signed James to a fully guaranteed four–year, $12.38 million contract that includes an initial signing bonus of $7.09 million.

James entered training camp slated as the starting strong safety, but suffered a hamstring injury that limited his progress. He also saw competition for the role from veterans Adrian Phillips and Rayshawn Jenkins. Head coach Anthony Lynn named James the starting strong safety to begin the regular season, alongside free safety Jahleel Addae.

External videos
- Derwin James picks off Jared Goff

On September 9, 2018, James made his professional regular season debut and first career start in the Los Angeles Chargers' home-opener against the Kansas City Chiefs and recorded three combined tackles (two solo), broke up two passes, and made his first career sack on quarterback Patrick Mahomes during a 38–28 loss. On September 23, 2018, James recorded nine combined tackles (seven solo), deflected a pass, and had his first career interception on a pass thrown by Jared Goff to tight end Gerald Everett in the end zone during the second quarter of a 35–23 loss at the Los Angeles Rams in Week 3. In Week 9, James collected a season-high 11 combined tackles (nine solo) during a 25–17 victory at the Seattle Seahawks. On December 2, 2018, James had three combined tackles (two solo), a season-high three pass deflections, and intercepted a pass thrown by Ben Roethlisberger to tight end Vance McDonald during a 33–30 victory at the Pittsburgh Steelers. On December 18, 2018, it was announced James was named to the 2019 Pro Bowl, marking his first Pro Bowl of his career. He earned first team All-Pro honors. He started all 16 games as a rookie in 2018 and produced a total of 105 combined tackles (75 solo), 3.5 sacks, 13 pass deflections, and three interceptions. He was named to the PFWA All-Rookie Team. James was ranked 31st by his peers on the NFL Top 100 Players of 2019. Pro Football Focus gave James an overall grade of 87.8 in 2018.

=== 2019 season ===
Throughout training camp, defensive coordinator Gus Bradley held an open competition between James, Rayshawn Jenkins, and rookie Nasir Adderley to name the starting free safety after Jahleel Addae was released during the off-season. On August 15, 2019, it was revealed that James had been dealing with a stress fracture in his right foot that would require surgery and would take up to three months to recover. On September 1, 2019, the Los Angeles Chargers placed James on injured reserve to begin the season. On November 25, 2019, he was officially designated for return and began participating in team practices. On November 30, 2019, the Los Angeles Chargers placed James on their active roster. Just prior to Week 13, head coach Anthony Lynn named James the starting free safety, alongside starting strong safety Rayshawn Jenkins. On December 1, 2019, James made his regular season debut and had four combined tackles (two solo) during a 23–20 loss at the Denver Broncos. In Week 15, he collected a season-high eight combined tackles (six solo) as the Chargers lost 10–39 to the Minnesota Vikings. He finished his sophomore season with 34 combined tackles (23 solo) and one pass deflection in five games and five starts. Although he was limited to five games due to injury, he was able to earn an overall grade of 82.5 from Pro Football Focus in 2019.

=== 2020 season ===
On September 5, 2020, the Los Angeles Chargers officially placed James on season-ending injured reserve after he underwent surgery to repair a torn meniscus. On December 15, 2020, the Los Angeles Chargers placed him on the reserve/COVID-19 list. On January 7, 2021, he was placed back on to injured reserve.

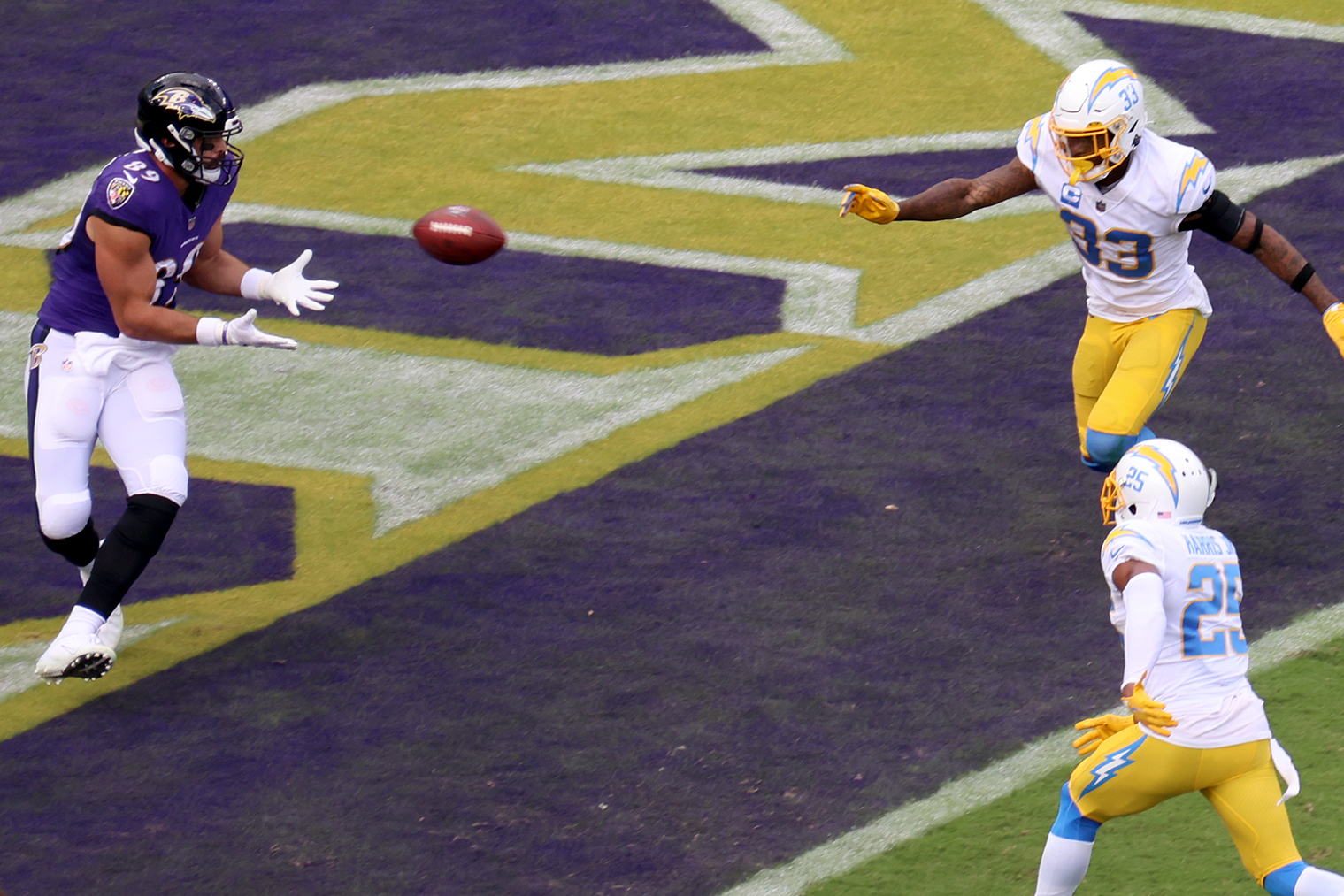
James (#33) playing against the Baltimore Ravens in 2021.

=== 2021 season ===
On January 4, 2021, the Los Angeles Chargers officially fired head coach Anthony Lynn after they finished the 2020 NFL season with a 7–9 record. On January 17, 2021, the Los Angeles Chargers announced the hiring Los Angeles Rams' defensive coordinator Brandon Staley as their new head coach. On April 30, 2021, the Los Angeles Chargers exercised the fifth-year option on James' rookie contract which guarantees a salary of $9.05 million for the 2022 NFL season. Defensive coordinator Renaldo Hill named James the starting strong safety to begin the season, alongside starting free safety Nasir Adderley.

In Week 4, James made six combined tackles (three solo), broke up a pass, and intercepted a pass by Derek Carr as the Chargers defeated the Las Vegas Raiders 28–14. The following week, he collected a season-high 16 combined tackles (nine solo) and had one sack during a 47–42 victory against the Cleveland Browns. He was inactive for the Chargers' Week 14 victory against the New York Giants after injuring his hamstring. James was sidelined for a Week 16 loss at the Houston Texans due to his hamstring injury. On December 22, 2021, James was named to his second Pro Bowl. He finished the season with a total of 118 combined tackles (75 solo), five pass deflections, three forced fumbles, two sacks, and two interceptions in 14 games and 14 starts. He was ranked 43rd by his fellow players on the NFL Top 100 Players of 2022. Pro Football Focus had him receive an overall grade of 78.1 in the 2021 NFL season. In his first four seasons, James earned an overall grade average of 90.1 from Pro Football Focus, which ranked fifth in that time span. He earned a coverage grade of 91.5 from PFF, which ranked ninth amongst all safeties in that four-year span.

=== 2022 season ===
On August 17, 2022, the Los Angeles Chargers signed James to a four–year, $76.53 million contract that includes $42.00 million guaranteed, $38.58 million guaranteed upon signing, and an initial signing bonus of $20.53 million. The deal made James the highest–paid safety in NFL history.

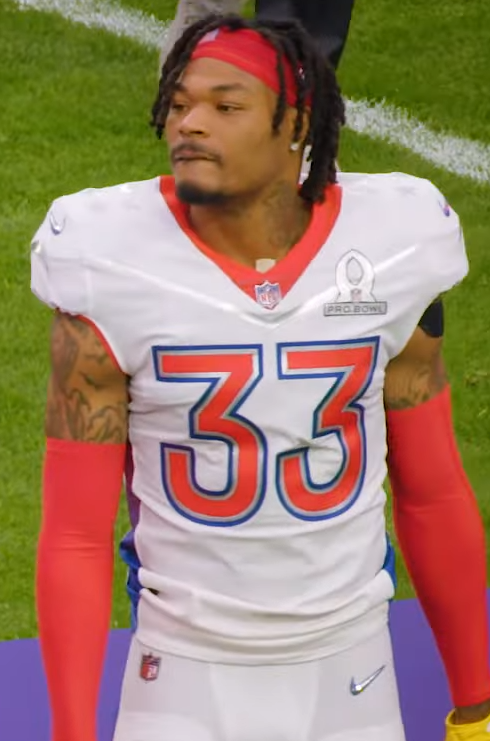
James at the Pro Bowl in 2022

Head coach Brandon Staley retained James and Nasir Adderley as the starting safeties to begin the season. In Week 4, James had seven combined tackles (three solo) and a season-high two pass deflections during a 34–24 victory at the Houston Texans. The following week, James racked up a season-high 14 combined tackles (nine solo) as the Chargers won 30–28 at the Cleveland Browns. On November 27, 2022, he recorded eight combined tackles (five solo), forced a fumble, broke up a pass, and intercepted a pass thrown by Kyler Murray to wide receiver DeAndre Hopkins during a 25–24 victory at the Arizona Cardinals. He was named AFC Defensive Player of the Month for November. On December 21, 2022, James was named to his third Pro Bowl. On December 26, 2022, James had three combined tackles (one solo) and intercepted a pass by Nick Foles before being ejected in the fourth quarter of a 20–3 win at the Indianapolis Colts after delivering an illegal helmet-to-helmet hit on wide receiver Ashton Dulin. He finished the 2022 NFL season with a total of 115 combined tackles (64 solo), four sacks, two interceptions, six passes defended, and two forced fumbles in 14 games and 14 starts. He was ranked 30th by his fellow players on the NFL Top 100 Players of 2023. He received an overall grade of 77.6 from Pro Football Focus which ranked 13th best amongst all qualified safeties in 2022. He earned a coverage grade of 74.5 from PFF

=== 2023 season ===
He returned as the de facto starting strong safety in 2023, but was paired with Alohi Gilman following the retirement of Nasir Adderley. Pro Football Focus ranked him as their top safety in the NFL heading into the 2023 NFL season. He was sidelined for the Chargers' Week 4 loss against the Las Vegas Raiders after injuring his hamstring. On October 29, 2023, James recorded five combined tackles (four solo), one pass deflection, and had his lone interception of the season on a pass thrown by Tyson Bagent to wide receiver Darnell Mooney during a 30–13 victory against the Chicago Bears. In Week 10, he collected a season-high 13 combined tackles (eight solo) during a 38–41 loss to the Detroit Lions. On December 15, 2023, the Los Angeles Chargers announced their decision to fire head coach Brandon Staley after falling to 5–9 and subsequently named outside linebackers coach Giff Smith the interim head coach for the last three games of the season. In Week 17, James recorded 12 combined tackles (seven solo), tied his season-high of two pass break ups, and had one sack as the Chargers lost 9–16 at the Denver Broncos. He finished the 2023 NFL season with a total of 125 combined tackles (86 solo), seven passes defended, two sacks, two fumble recoveries, and one interception in 16 games and 16 starts. He was ranked 83rd by his fellow players on the NFL Top 100 Players of 2024. Pro Football Focus had him receive an overall grade of 60.1 in 2023, which ranked 71st amongst all safeties.

=== 2024 season ===
On January 24, 2024, the Los Angeles Chargers announced their decision to hire Michigan head coach Jim Harbaugh as their new head coach. Defensive coordinator Jesse Minter retained James and Alohi Gilman as the starting safeties to begin the season. In Week 11, James produced a season-high ten combined tackles and was credited with half a sack during a 34–27 win against the Cincinnati Bengals. On December 1, 2024, James tied his season-high of ten combined tackles (five solo), had one pass deflection, and made his only interception of the season off a pass thrown by Kirk Cousins to wide receiver Drake London at the end of a 17–13 win at the Atlanta Falcons to seal the Chargers' victory. He was named AFC Defensive Player of the Month for December. He finished the season with 93 combined tackles (60 solo), seven pass deflections, 5.5 sacks, and one interception in 16 games and 16 starts. He earned a fourth career Pro Bowl nomination. He was ranked 54th by his fellow players on the NFL Top 100 Players of 2025. Pro Football Focus had him receive an overall grade of 80.5 in 2024, which ranked 10th out of 170 qualified safeties that season.

=== 2025 season ===
In Week 3, James recorded 12 tackles, four tackles for loss, and a sack in a 23-20 win over the Denver Broncos, earning AFC Defensive Player of the Week. He was named to his fifth Pro Bowl, and his second consecutive appearance. James also earned 2nd team All-Pro honors. Pro Football Focus had him receive an overall grade of 81.2 in 2025, which ranked 8th out of 98 qualified safeties that season.

=== 2026 season ===
On May 26, 2026, James signed a three-year, $75.6 million contract extension with the Chargers that made him the highest paid safety in the league for the second time in his career.

== Career statistics ==
Legend
**Bold**	Career high

=== NFL ===
==== Regular season ====
Year	Team	Games		Tackles					Interceptions						Fumbles	
Year	Team	GP	GS	Cmb	Solo	Ast	Sck	TFL	PD	Int	Yds	Avg	Lng	TD	FF	FR
2018	LAC	16	16	105	75	30	3.5	4	**13**	**3**	**30**	**10.0**	**23**	0	0	0
2019	LAC	5	5	34	23	11	0.0	3	1	0	0	0.0	0	0	0	0
2020	LAC	0	0	Did not play due to injury												
2021	LAC	15	15	118	75	43	2.0	7	5	2	20	**10.0**	15	0	**3**	0
2022	LAC	14	14	115	64	**51**	4.0	5	6	2	0	0.0	0	0	2	0
2023	LAC	16	16	**125**	**86**	39	2.0	5	7	1	6	6.0	6	0	0	**2**
2024	LAC	16	16	93	60	33	**5.5**	**10**	7	1	2	2.0	2	0	0	1
2025	LAC	16	16	94	50	44	2.0	6	7	**3**	28	9.3	21	0	1	0
2026	LAC	3	3	21	12	9	0.0	0	1	0	0	0.0	0	0	0	0
Career		101	101	705	445	260	19.0	40	47	12	86	7.2	23	0	6	3

==== Postseason ====
Year	Team	Games		Tackles					Interceptions						Fumbles	
Year	Team	GP	GS	Cmb	Solo	Ast	Sck	TFL	PD	Int	Yds	Avg	Lng	TD	FF	FR
2018	LAC	2	2	**14**	**10**	**4**	0.0	**3**	0	0	0	0.0	0	0	0	0
2022	LAC	1	1	9	6	3	0.0	0	0	0	0	0.0	0	0	0	0
2024	LAC	1	1	7	5	2	0.0	1	**1**	0	0	0.0	0	0	0	**1**
2025	LAC	1	1	4	3	1	0.0	0	0	0	0	0.0	0	0	0	0
Career		5	5	34	24	10	0.0	4	1	0	0	0.0	0	0	0	1

=== College ===
Year	Team	GP	Tackles					Interceptions					Fumbles			
Year	Team	GP	Cmb	Solo	Ast	Sck	TFL	PD	Int	Yds	Avg	TD	FF	FR	Yds	TD
2015	Florida State	13	**91**	**52**	**39**	**4.5**	**9.5**	4	0	0	—	0	**2**	**2**	**3**	0
2016	Florida State	2	11	9	2	0.0	0.0	0	1	0	0.0	0	0	0	0	0
2017	Florida State	12	84	49	35	1.0	5.5	**11**	**2**	**41**	**20.5**	**1**	0	0	0	0
Career		27	186	110	76	5.5	15.0	15	3	41	13.7	1	2	2	3	0

== Personal life ==
James is a cousin of Vince Williams and Karlos Williams, both former Florida State Seminoles players, as well as Mike James, former Miami Hurricanes running back. He is also the second cousin of former Miami Hurricanes and NFL star running back Edgerrin James. He is a member of Phi Beta Sigma fraternity.
