= Dazeran Jones =

American basketball player (born 1993)

Free Agent
- Position: Point guard / shooting guard / centre

Personal information
- Born: December 25, 1993 (age 32)
- Listed height: 6 ft 6 in (1.98 m)
- Listed weight: 189 lb (86 kg)

Career information
- College: Warner University (2012–2014)
- NBA draft: 2016: undrafted
- Playing career: 2015–present

Career history
- 2015: Jacksonville Giants
- 2016: Orlando Waves

Career highlights
- ABA League champion (2016)

Dazeran Jaquon Jones (born 25 December 1993), also known as Duke Skywalka, is an American actor and former professional basketball player who played as a centre for American Basketball Association teams Orlando Waves and Jacksonville Giants, where he won the ABA championship in 2016. He played college basketball for Warner University, played in the Big3 league for the Killer 3s, and was featured in the Hollywood movie White Men Can't Jump.

== Early life and education ==
Jones was born in Haines City, Florida. He attended Ridge Community High School, Davenport, Florida for his secondary education, graduating in 2012. He played basketball in high school and was Ridge Community High School's all time leading rebounder and averaged a double-double. He also led the district in rebounds and blocks, leading his team to the regional finals.

== Career ==
=== College career ===
Jones attended Warner University on a basketball scholarship and played in the National Association of Intercollegiate Athletics (NAIA) for the Warner University basketball team, the Warner Royals. He forfeited his scholarship due to a prolonged foot fracture injury that kept him sidelined.

=== Professional career ===
After recovering from his foot fracture, Jones was signed by basketball team Jacksonville Giants for the 2015-16 season where he won the ABA National championship. He moved on to play for fellow ABA team, Orlando Waves, from 2016. He played as a centre. Former New York Knicks player and head coach, Charles Oakley, drafted him in 2024 to play in the Big3 league for the Killer 3s.

=== Post professional basketball ===
He took part in the production NBA 2K23 and NBA 2K24 editions of NBA 2K as a motion-capture actor. He also participated in Ball Is Life's park takeovers as the leader of the Eastcoast squad. Jones was featured in the season 3 of TV Series, The Crew League, alongside Chris Brown and G Herbo. He was cast in the 20th Century Studios 2023 remake of the movie, White Men Can't Jump that was released on Hulu.

== Filmography ==
=== Film and television ===
Year	Title	Role	Notes
2022	The Crew League	Duke Skywalka	Season 3 of reality television series (with Chris Brown, G Herbo and YK Osiris)
2023	White Men Can't Jump	Duke Skywalka	2023 remake of White Men Can't Jump (released on Hulu).
