= 2025 Kansas State Wildcats football team =

American college football season

2025 Kansas State Wildcats football
- Conference: Big 12 Conference
- Record: 6–6 (5–4 Big 12)
- Head coach: Chris Klieman (7th season)
- Offensive coordinator: Matt Wells (2nd season)
- Offensive scheme: Spread
- Defensive coordinator: Joe Klanderman (6th season)
- Base defense: 3–3–5 or 4–2–5
- Home stadium: Bill Snyder Family Football Stadium

Uniform
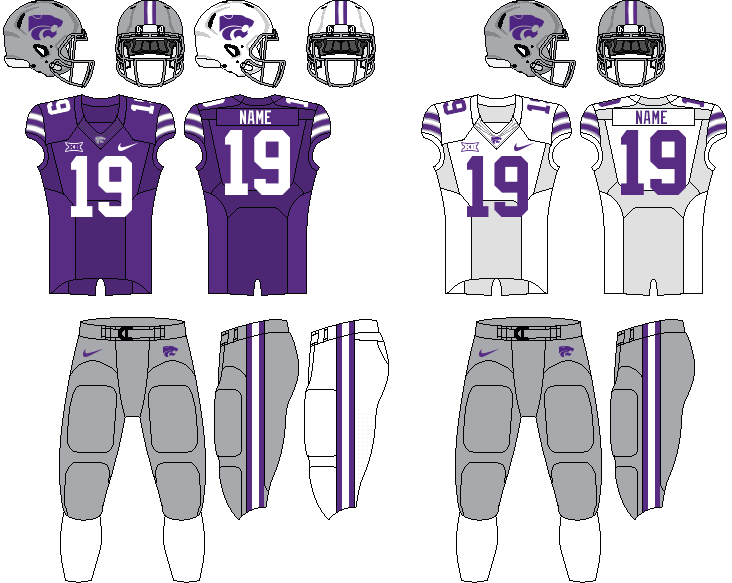

2025 Big 12 Conference football standings
	Conf.			Overall
Team	W		L	W		L
No. 7 Texas Tech y$^	8	–	1	12	–	2
No. 11 BYU y	8	–	1	12	–	2
No. 14 Utah	7	–	2	11	–	2
No. 22 Houston	6	–	3	10	–	3
Arizona	6	–	3	9	–	4
Arizona State	6	–	3	8	–	5
No. 25 TCU	5	–	4	9	–	4
Iowa State	5	–	4	8	–	4
Cincinnati	5	–	4	7	–	6
Kansas State	5	–	4	6	–	6
Baylor	3	–	6	5	–	7
Kansas	3	–	6	5	–	7
UCF	2	–	7	5	–	7
West Virginia	2	–	7	4	–	8
Colorado	1	–	8	3	–	9
Oklahoma State	0	–	9	1	–	11
Championship: Texas Tech 34, BYU 7
^ – College Football Playoff participant; $ – Conference champion; y – Championship game participant; Rankings from AP Poll

The 2025 Kansas State Wildcats football team represented Kansas State University as a member of the Big 12 Conference during the 2025 NCAA Division I FBS football season. Led by seventh-year head coach, Chris Klieman, the Wildcats play home games at Bill Snyder Family Football Stadium located in Manhattan, Kansas.

On December 3, Klieman announced that he would be retiring following the Wildcats' bowl game. The following day, Texas A&M offensive coordinator Collin Klein, a former quarterback for the Wildcats, was named the program's new head coach. Kansas State declined appearing in a bowl game due to their coaching change, player injuries, and transfers. This became the first time the Wildcats did not appear in a bowl game since 2020.

The Kansas State Wildcats drew an average home attendance of 51,773.

== Schedule ==
Date	Time	Opponent	Rank	Site	TV	Result	Attendance
August 23	11:00 a.m.	vs. No. 22 Iowa State	No. 17	Aviva Stadium; Dublin, Ireland (Aer Lingus College Football Classic, rivalry)	ESPN	L 21–24	47,221
August 30	6:00 p.m.	North Dakota*	No. 17	Bill Snyder Family Football Stadium; Manhattan, KS	ESPN+	W 38–35	51,927
September 6	6:00 p.m.	Army*		Bill Snyder Family Football Stadium; Manhattan, KS	ESPN	L 21–24	52,723
September 12	8:00 p.m.	at Arizona (Note: Although both Kansas State and Arizona are in the Big 12, this game does not count in the conference standings due to the game being scheduled before Arizona joined the Big 12.)*		Arizona Stadium; Tucson, AZ	FOX	L 17–23	40,051
September 27	11:00 a.m.	UCF		Bill Snyder Family Football Stadium; Manhattan, KS	FS1	W 34–20	53,013
October 4	11:00 a.m.	at Baylor		McLane Stadium; Waco, TX	ESPN+	L 34–35	35,596
October 11	2:30 p.m.	TCU^{†}		Bill Snyder Family Football Stadium; Manhattan, KS	FOX	W 41–28	51,316
October 25	11:00 a.m.	at Kansas		David Booth Kansas Memorial Stadium; Lawrence, KS (Sunflower Showdown)	TNT/TruTV	W 42–17	41,525
November 1	2:30 p.m.	No. 13 Texas Tech		Bill Snyder Family Football Stadium; Manhattan, KS	FOX	L 20–43	52,111
November 15	11:00 a.m.	at Oklahoma State		Boone Pickens Stadium; Stillwater, OK	ESPNU	W 14–6	46,340
November 22	3:00 p.m.	at No. 12 Utah		Rice–Eccles Stadium; Salt Lake City, UT	ESPN2	L 47–51	51,444
November 29	11:00 a.m.	Colorado		Bill Snyder Family Football Stadium; Manhattan, KS (rivalry)	FS1	W 24–14	49,549
*Non-conference game; ^{†}Homecoming; Rankings from AP Poll (and CFP Rankings, after November 4) - Released prior to game; All times are in Central time

== Rankings ==
Ranking movements Legend: ██ Increase in ranking ██ Decrease in ranking — = Not ranked RV = Received votes
	Week																
Poll	Pre	1	2	3	4	5	6	7	8	9	10	11	12	13	14	15	Final
AP	17	RV	—	—	—	—	—	—	—	—	—	—	—	—	—	—	—
Coaches	20	RV	—	—	—	—	—	—	—	—	—	—	—	—	—	—	—
CFP	Not released										—	—	—	—	—	—	Not released

== Game summaries ==
=== vs. No. 22 Iowa State ===
No. 22 Iowa State Cyclones (0–0) vs. No. 17 Kansas State Wildcats (0–0) – Game summary

Quarter	1	2	3	4	Total
No. 22 Cyclones	7	0	7	10	24
No. 17 Wildcats	0	7	0	14	21

at Aviva Stadium • Dublin, Ireland

- Date: August 23
- Game time: 11:00 a.m. CDT / 5:00 p.m. IST
- Game weather: Rain, 67 °F (19 °C), S 3 MPH
- Game attendance: 47,221
- Referee: Tuta Salaam
- TV announcers (ESPN): Dave Pasch (play-by-play), Dusty Dvoracek (analyst), and Taylor McGregor (sideline reporter)

Game information

First quarter

- ISU – Dominic Overby 23-yard pass from Rocco Becht (Kyle Konrardy kick), 3:26. Cyclones 7–0. Drive: 4 plays, 49 yards, 1:44.

Second quarter

- KSU – Avery Johnson 10-yard run (Luis Rodriguez kick), 14:55. Tied 7–7. Drive: 8 plays, 65 yards, 3:31.

Third quarter

- ISU – Brett Eskildsen 24-yard pass from Rocco Becht (Kyle Konrardy kick), 1:07. Cyclones 14–7. Drive: 11 plays, 67 yards, 5:59.

Fourth quarter

- KSU – Jayce Brown 37-yard pass from Avery Johnson (Luis Rodriguez kick), 14:09. Tied 14–14. Drive: 5 plays, 75 yards, 1:58.
- ISU – Kyle Konrardy 34-yard field goal, 10:04. Cyclones 17–14. Drive: 10 plays, 57 yards, 4:05.
- ISU – Rocco Becht 7-yard run (Kyle Konrardy kick), 6:38. Cyclones 24–14. Drive: 4 plays, 30 yards, 1:41.
- KSU – Jerand Bradley 65-yard pass from Avery Johnson (Luis Rodriguez kick), 6:23. Cyclones 24–21. Drive: 1 play, 65 yards, 0:15.

Statistics	ISU	KSU
First downs	19	13
Plays–yards	60–313	48–383
Rushes–yards	46–130	27–110
Passing yards	183	273
Passing: comp–att–int	14–28–0	21–30–0
Turnovers	2	2
Time of possession	33:52	26:08

Team	Category	Player	Statistics
Iowa State	Passing	Rocco Becht	14/28, 183 yards, 2 TD
Iowa State	Rushing	Carson Hansen	16 rushes, 71 yards
Iowa State	Receiving	Brett Eskildsen	3 receptions, 46 yards, TD
Kansas State	Passing	Avery Johnson	21/30, 273 yards, 2 TD
Kansas State	Rushing	Joe Jackson	12 rushes, 51 yards
Kansas State	Receiving	Jayce Brown	4 receptions, 78 yards, TD

=== vs North Dakota (FCS) ===
North Dakota Fighting Hawks (FCS) (0–0) at No. 17 Kansas State Wildcats (0–1) – Game summary

Quarter	1	2	3	4	Total
Fighting Hawks (FCS)	7	14	0	14	35
No. 17 Wildcats	10	7	14	7	38

at Bill Snyder Family Football Stadium, Manhattan, Kansas

- Date: August 30, 2025
- Game time: 6:00 p.m.
- Game weather: Cloudy • Temperature: 73 °F (23 °C) • Wind: SE at 5 miles per hour (8.0 km/h)
- Game attendance: 51,927
- Referee: Tim Rich
- TV announcers (ESPN+): Shawn Kenney (play-by-play) and Barrett Brooks (analyst)

Game information

First quarter

- KSU – Luis Rodriguez 30-yard field goal, 5:26. Wildcats 3–0. Drive: 12 plays, 67 yards, 6:11.
- UND – Jerry Kaminski 1-yard run (C.J. Elrichs kick), 2:54. Fighting Hawks 7–3. Drive: 5 plays, 75 yards, 2:32.
- KSU – Jayce Brown 44-yard pass from Avery Johnson (Luis Rodriguez kick), 1:55. Wildcats 10–7. Drive: 5 plays, 68 yards, 0:54.

Second quarter

- UND – Jerry Kaminski 1-yard run (C.J. Elrichs kick), 7:46. Fighting Hawks 14–10. Drive: 10 plays, 80 yards, 5:50.
- KSU – Jaron Tibbs 30-yard pass from Avery Johnson (Luis Rodriguez kick), 4:15. Wildcats 17–14. Drive: 6 plays, 66 yards, 3:12.
- UND – Sawyer Seidl 16-yard run (C.J. Elrichs kick), 0:24. Fighting Hawks 21–17. Drive: 13 plays, 75 yards, 3:51.

Third quarter

- KSU – DeVon Rice 9-yard run (Luis Rodriguez kick), 8:41. Wildcats 24–21. Drive: 10 plays, 57 yards, 4:47.
- KSU – DeVon Rice 13-yard run (Luis Rodriguez kick), 3:41. Wildcats 31–21. Drive: 8 plays, 77 yards, 3:58.

Fourth quarter

- UND – Korey Tai 22-yard pass from Jerry Kaminski (C.J. Elrichs kick), 10:12. Wildcats 31–28. Drive: 9 plays, 71 yards, 4:35.
- UND – Sawyer Seidl 20-yard run (C.J. Elrichs kick), 4:19. Fighting Hawks 35–31. Drive: 9 plays, 70 yards, 4:41.
- KSU – Joe Jackson 6-yard pass from Avery Johnson (Luis Rodriguez kick), 0:42. Wildcats 38–35. Drive: 10 plays, 81 yards, 1:03.

Statistics	UND	KSU
First downs	23	22
Plays–yards	72–354	72–461
Rushes–yards	33–102	29–143
Passing yards	252	318
Passing: Comp–Att–Int	24–39–0	28–43–0
Turnovers	1	1
Time of possession	31:14	28:46

Team	Category	Player	Statistics
North Dakota	Passing	Jerry Kaminski	23/38, 231 yards, TD
North Dakota	Rushing	Sawyer Seidl	8 carries, 62 yards, 2 TD
North Dakota	Receiving	Caden Dennis	2 receptions, 41 yards
Kansas State	Passing	Avery Johnson	28/43, 318 yards, 3 TD
Kansas State	Rushing	Joe Jackson	11 carries, 55 yards
Kansas State	Receiving	Jayce Brown	12 receptions, 109 yards, TD

=== vs Army ===
Army Black Knights (0–1) at Kansas State Wildcats (1–1) – Game summary

Quarter	1	2	3	4	Total
Black Knights	0	7	7	10	24
Wildcats	3	10	8	0	21

at Bill Snyder Family Football Stadium • Manhattan, Kansas

- Date: September 6
- Game time: 6:00 p.m.
- Game weather: Sunny, 73 °F (23 °C)
- Game attendance: 52,723
- Referee: David Alvarez
- TV announcers (ESPN): Roy Philpott (play-by-play), Louis Riddick (analyst), and Kris Budden (sideline reporter)

Game information

First quarter

- KSU – Luis Rodriguez 34-yard field goal, 11:21. Wildcats 3–0. Drive: 8 plays, 33 yards, 3:31.

Second quarter

- KSU – Jaron Tibbs 32-yard pass from Avery Johnson (Luis Rodriguez kick), 11:47. Wildcats 10–0. Drive: 6 plays, 47 yards, 2:33.
- KSU – Luis Rodriguez 38-yard field goal, 2:25. Wildcats 13–0. Drive: 12 plays, 68 yards, 7:03.
- ARMY – Brady Anderson 2-yard pass from Cale Hellums (Dawson Jones kick), 0:00. Wildcats 13–7. Drive: 16 plays, 75 yards, 2:25.

Third quarter

- ARMY – Cale Hellums 1-yard run (Dawson Jones kick), 3:20. Black Knights 14–13. Drive: 14 plays, 89 yards, 7:58.
- KSU – Bryce Noernberg 99-yard kickoff return (Avery Johnson pass to Jaron Tibbs), 3:08. Wildcats 21–14.

Fourth quarter

- ARMY – Dawson Jones 35-yard field goal, 10:46. Wildcats 21–17. Drive: 13 plays, 57 yards, 7:22.
- ARMY – Cale Hellums 14-yard run (Dawson Jones kick), 2:52. Black Knights 24–21. Drive: 14 plays, 56 yards, 7:54.

Statistics	ARMY	KSU
First downs	20	13
Plays–yards	82–332	43–246
Rushes–yards	70–237	18–74
Passing yards	95	172
Passing: comp–att–int	8–12–0	15–25–1
Turnovers	0	1
Time of possession	40:29	19:31

Team	Category	Player	Statistics
Army	Passing	Noah Short	1/1, 52 yards
Army	Rushing	Cale Hellums	41 carries, 124 yards, 2 TD
Army	Receiving	Brady Anderson	3 receptions, 64 yards, TD
Kansas State	Passing	Avery Johnson	15/25, 172 yards, TD, INT
Kansas State	Rushing	Joe Jackson	7 carries, 30 yards
Kansas State	Receiving	Jaron Tibbs	5 receptions, 61 yards, TD

=== at Arizona ===
Kansas State Wildcats (1–2) at Arizona Wildcats (2–0) – Game summary

Quarter	1	2	3	4	Total
Kansas State	3	0	14	0	17
Arizona	7	10	3	3	23

at Arizona Stadium • Tucson, Arizona

- Date: September 12
- Game time: 8:00 p.m.
- Game weather: Cloudy, 89 °F (32 °C)
- Game attendance: 40,051
- Referee: Kevin Mar
- TV announcers (FOX): Jason Benetti (play-by-play), Robert Griffin III (analyst) and Alexa Landestoy (sideline)

Game information

First quarter

- (7:42) KSU – Luis Rodriguez 51-yard field goal (Drive: 4 plays, -10 yards, 1:27; Kansas State 3–0)
- (5:01) ARIZ – Noah Fifita 15-yard run, Michael Salgado-Medina kick (Drive: 5 plays, 75 yards, 2:41; Arizona 7–3)

Second quarter

- (10:28) ARIZ – Michael Salgado-Medina 31-yard field goal (Drive: 9 plays, 49 yards, 3:46; Arizona 10–3)
- (4:17) ARIZ – Noah Fifita 2-yard run, Michael Salgado-Medina kick (Drive: 10 plays, 72 yards, 5:15; Arizona 17–3)

Third quarter

- (14:47) KSU – Jayce Brown 75-yard run, Luis Rodriguez kick (Drive: 1 play, 75 yards, 0:13; Arizona 17–10)
- (10:36) KSU – Avery Johnson 1-yard run, Luis Rodriguez kick (Drive: 5 plays, 13 yards, 2:35; Tied 17–17)
- (2:40) ARIZ – Michael Salgado-Medina 31-yard field goal (Drive: 11 plays, 33 yards, 5:21; Arizona 20–17)

Fourth quarter

- (4:25) ARIZ – Michael Salgado-Medina 41-yard field goal (Drive: 14 plays, 58 yards, 7:30; Arizona 23–17)

Statistics	KSU	ARIZ
First downs	8	21
Plays–yards	53–193	79–412
Rushes–yards	24–105	45–234
Passing yards	88	178
Passing: comp–att–int	13–29–0	16–34–1
Turnovers	1	2
Time of possession	23:26	36:55

Team	Category	Player	Statistics
Kansas State	Passing	Avery Johnson	13/29, 88 yards
Kansas State	Rushing	Jayce Brown	1 carry, 75 yards, TD
Kansas State	Receiving	Jayce Brown	6 receptions, 68 yards
Arizona	Passing	Noah Fifita	16/33, 178 yards
Arizona	Rushing	Ismail Mahdi	22 carries, 189 yards
Arizona	Receiving	Chris Hunter	3 receptions, 37 yards

=== vs UCF ===
UCF Knights (3–0) at Kansas State Wildcats (1–3) – Game summary

Quarter	1	2	3	4	Total
Knights	0	7	10	3	20
Wildcats	0	17	14	3	34

at Bill Snyder Family Football Stadium • Manhattan, Kansas

- Date: September 27
- Game time: 11:00 a.m.
- Game weather: Sunny, 73 °F (23 °C)
- Game attendance: 53,013
- Referee: Luke Richmond
- TV announcers (FS1): Connor Onion (play-by-play) and Mark Helfrich (analyst)

Game information

First quarter

- No scoring plays.

Second quarter

- KSU – Luis Rodriguez 38-yard field goal, 13:03, Wildcats 3–0. Drive: 10 plays, 62 yards, 5:17.
- KSU – Joe Jackson 1-yard run (Luis Rodriguez kick), 3:52, Wildcats 10–0. Drive: 7 plays, 26 yards, 3:35.
- UCF – DJ Black 82-yard pass from Jacurri Brown (Noe Ruelas kick), 2:54, Wildcats 10–7. Drive: 2 plays, 77 yards, 0:51.
- KSU – Will Anciaux 3-yard pass from Avery Johnson (Luis Rodriguez kick), 0:45, Wildcats 17–7. Drive: 9 plays, 73 yards, 2:04.

Third quarter

- KSU – Garrett Oakley 1-yard pass from Avery Johnson (Luis Rodriguez kick), 9:58, Wildcats 24–7. Drive: 6 plays, 65 yards, 2:46.
- UCF – Noe Ruelas 53-yard field goal, 2:01, Wildcats 24–10. Drive: 11 plays, 48 yards, 4:02.
- KSU – Dylan Edwards 75-yard run (Luis Rodriguez kick), 1:50, Wildcats 31–10. Drive: 1 play, 75 yards, 0:11.
- UCF – Jaden Nixon 54-yard run (Noe Ruelas kick), 0:20, Wildcats 31–17. Drive: 6 plays, 75 yards, 1:30.

Fourth quarter

- UCF – Noe Ruelas 40-yard field goal, 9:34, Wildcats 31–20. Drive: 8 plays, 59 yards, 4:03.
- KSU – Luis Rodriguez 48-yard field goal, 2:41, Wildcats 34–20. Drive: 4 plays, 7 yards, 1:35.

Statistics	UCF	KSU
First downs	13	21
Plays–yards	59–402	70–434
Rushes–yards	33–205	44–266
Passing yards	197	168
Passing: comp–att–int	13–26–2	18–26–1
Turnovers	3	1
Time of possession	27:51	32:09

Team	Category	Player	Statistics
UCF	Passing	Tayven Jackson	12/24, 115 yards, INT
UCF	Rushing	Myles Montgomery	10 carries, 119 yards
UCF	Receiving	DJ Black	1 reception, 82 yards, TD
Kansas State	Passing	Avery Johnson	18/25, 168 yards, 2 TD
Kansas State	Rushing	Dylan Edwards	20 carries, 166 yards, TD
Kansas State	Receiving	Jaron Tibbs	8 receptions, 72 yards

=== at Baylor ===
Kansas State Wildcats (2–3) at Baylor Bears (3–2) – Game summary

Quarter	1	2	3	4	Total
Wildcats	7	10	14	3	34
Bears	3	14	0	18	35

at McLane Stadium • Waco, Texas

- Date: October 4
- Game time: 11:00 a.m.
- Game weather: Clear • Temperature: 80 °F (27 °C) • Wind: SE 5 mph
- Game attendance: 35,596
- Referee: Kevin Mar
- TV announcers (ESPN+): Pete Sousa (play-by-play), Leger Douzable (analyst) and Tori Petry (sideline)

Game information

First quarter

- (9:33) KSU – Avery Johnson 31-yard run, Luis Rodriguez kick (Drive: 10 plays, 75 yards, 5:27; KSU 7–0)
- (4:18) BAY – Connor Hawkins 30-yard field goal (Drive: 13 plays, 76 yards, 5:11; KSU 7–3)

Second quarter

- (7:38) BAY – Kobe Prentice 30-yard pass from Sawyer Robertson, Connor Hawkins kick (Drive: 4 plays, 70 yards, 1:31; BAY 10–7)
- (4:23) KSU – Luis Rodriguez 49-yard field goal (Drive: 9 plays, 57 yards, 3:11; Tied 10–10)
- (1:57) BAY – Michael Turner 17-yard run, Connor Hawkins kick (Drive: 8 plays, 75 yards, 2:26; BAY 17–10)
- (00:13) KSU – Garrett Oakley 9-yard pass from Avery Johnson, Luis Rodriguez kick (Drive: 9 plays, 72 yards, 1:38; Tied 17–17)

Third quarter

- (4:35) KSU – Jayce Brown 12-yard pass from Avery Johnson, Luis Rodriguez kick (Drive: 14 plays, 97 yards, 6:41; KSU 24–17)
- (1:15) KSU – Dylan Edwards 5-yard run, Luis Rodriguez kick (Drive: 4 plays, 44 yards, 2:02; KSU 31–17)

Fourth quarter

- (8:50) BAY – Bryson Washington 11-yard pass from Sawyer Robertson, Sawyer Robertson run for 2-pt (Drive: 3 plays, 82 yards, 1:07; KSU 31–25)
- (4:28) BAY – Jacob Redding 66-yard interception return, Connor Hawkins kick (BAY 32-31)
- (1:48) KSU – Luis Rodriguez 22-yard field goal (Drive: 7 plays, 72 yards, 2:35; KSU 34–32)
- (00:31) BAY – Connor Hawkins 53-yard field goal (Drive: 6 plays, 28 yards, 1:10; BAY 35–34)

Statistics	KSU	BAY
First downs	30	25
Plays–yards	82–501	64–443
Rushes–yards	36–162	25–98
Passing yards	339	345
Passing: comp–att–int	29–45–1	25–39–1
Turnovers	1	2
Time of possession	37:47	22:13

Team	Category	Player	Statistics
Kansas State	Passing	Avery Johnson	29/45, 339 yards, 2 TD, INT
Kansas State	Rushing	Avery Johnson	10 carries, 72 yards, TD
Kansas State	Receiving	Jayce Brown	4 receptions, 106 yards, TD
Baylor	Passing	Sawyer Robertson	25/39, 345 yards, 2 TD, INT
Baylor	Rushing	Bryson Washington	9 carries, 65 yards
Baylor	Receiving	Michael Trigg	8 receptions, 155 yards

=== vs TCU ===
TCU Horned Frogs (4–1) at Kansas State Wildcats (2–4) – Game summary

Quarter	1	2	3	4	Total
Horned Frogs	0	7	7	14	28
Wildcats	0	14	14	13	41

at Bill Snyder Family Football Stadium • Manhattan, Kansas

- Date: October 11
- Game time: 2:30 p.m.
- Game weather: Sunny • Temperature: 81 °F (27 °C) • Wind: SE at 9 miles per hour (14 km/h)
- Game attendance: 51,316
- Referee: Cravonne Barrett
- TV announcers (FOX): Tim Brando (play-by-play), Devin Gardner (analyst), and Josh Sims (sideline)

Game information

First quarter

- No scoring plays.

Second quarter

- (5:35) TCU – Jeremy Payne 1-yard run, Nate McCashland kick (Drive: 12 plays, 93 yards, 4:56; TCU 7–0)
- (2:45) KSU – Garrett Oakley 32-yard pass from Avery Johnson, Luis Rodriguez kick (Drive: 6 plays, 75 yards, 2:50; Tied 7–7)
- (2:02) KSU – Wesley Fair 15-yard fumble recovery, Luis Rodriguez kick (Kansas State 14–7)

Third quarter

- (10:28) KSU – Des Purnell 25-yard interception, Luis Rodriguez kick (Kansas State 21–7)
- (3:57) KSU – Garrett Oakley 17-yard pass from Avery Johnson, Luis Rodriguez kick (Drive: 10 plays, 74 yards, 5:00; Kansas State 28–7)
- (2:06) TCU – Chase Curtis 2-yard pass from Josh Hoover, Nate McCashland kick (Drive: 7 plays, 75 yards, 1:51; Kansas State 28–14)

Fourth quarter

- (10:22) KSU – Jerand Bradley 12-yard pass from Avery Johnson, Luis Rodriguez kick (Drive: 12 plays, 75 yards, 6:44; Kansas State 35–14)
- (10:05) TCU – Eric McAlister 85-yard pass from Josh Hoover, Nate McCashland kick (Drive: 1 play, 75 yards, 0:17; Kansas State 35–21)
- (4:34) KSU – Luis Rodriguez 19-yard field goal (Drive: 6 plays, 20 yards, 2:49; Kansas State 38–21)
- (2:06) KSU – Luis Rodriguez 36-yard field goal (Drive: 4 plays, 7 yards, 2:09; Kansas State 41–21)
- (0:26) TCU – Eric McAlister 37-yard pass from Josh Hoover, Nate McCashland kick (Drive: 5 plays, 73 yards, 1:33; Kansas State 41–28)

Statistics	TCU	KSU
First downs	19	20
Plays–yards	69–448	71–343
Rushes–yards	22–72	45–145
Passing yards	376	198
Passing: comp–att–int	26–47–2	16–26–0
Turnovers	3	0
Time of possession	23:41	36:19

Team	Category	Player	Statistics
TCU	Passing	Josh Hoover	26/47, 376 yards, 3 TD, 2 INT
TCU	Rushing	Kevorian Barnes	12 carries, 81 yards
TCU	Receiving	Eric McAlister	4 receptions, 156 yards, 2 TD
Kansas State	Passing	Avery Johnson	16/26, 198 yards, 3 TD
Kansas State	Rushing	Joe Jackson	27 carries, 110 yards
Kansas State	Receiving	Garrett Oakley	4 receptions, 71 yards, 2 TD

=== at Kansas (Sunflower Showdown) ===
Kansas State Wildcats (3–4) at Kansas Jayhawks (4–3) – Game summary

Quarter	1	2	3	4	Total
Wildcats	21	0	14	7	42
Jayhawks	7	7	3	0	17

at David Booth Kansas Memorial Stadium • Lawrence, Kansas

- Date: October 25
- Game time: 11:00 a.m.
- Game weather: 54°, Rain, Wind SE 9 mph
- Game attendance: 41,525
- Referee: Henry Johns
- TV announcers (TNT/TruTV): J.B. Long (play-by-play), Mike Golic Jr. (analyst), and Coy Wire (sideline reporter)

Game information

First quarter

- KU – Jalon Daniels 6-yard run (Laith Marjan kick), 12:50. Jayhawks 7–0. Drive: 5 plays, 25 yards, 2:06.
- KSU – Avery Johnson 2-yard run (Luis Rodriguez kick), 9:50. Tied 7–7. Drive: 7 plays, 82 yards, 2:56.
- KSU – Ralph Ortiz 20-yard fumble return (Luis Rodriguez kick), 9:16. Wildcats 14–7.
- KSU – Jaron Tibbs 27-yard pass from Avery Johnson (Luis Rodriguez kick), 0:12. Wildcats 21–7. Drive: 5 plays, 72 yards, 2:15.

Second quarter

- KU – Daniel Hishaw Jr. 3-yard run (Laith Marjan kick), 0:30. Wildcats 21–14. Drive: 18 plays, 85 yards, 8:34.

Third quarter

- KSU – DeVon Rice 1-yard run (Luis Rodriguez kick), 7:23. Wildcats 28–14. Drive: 7 plays, 42 yards, 3:47.
- KU – Laith Marjan 47-yard field goal, 1:21. Wildcats 28–17. Drive: 12 plays, 45 yards, 6:02.
- KSU – Jayce Brown 78-yard pass from Avery Johnson (Luis Rodriguez kick), 1:03. Wildcats 35–17. Drive: 1 play, 78 yards, 0:13.

Fourth quarter

- KSU – Avery Johnson 3-yard run (Luis Rodriguez kick), 4:17. Wildcats 42–17. Drive: 10 plays, 30 yards, 6:16.

Statistics	KSU	KU
First downs	18	17
Plays–yards	53-371	77-247
Rushes–yards	36-140	40-110
Passing yards	231	137
Passing: comp–att–int	11-17-0	18-37-2
Turnovers	1	4
Time of possession	27:20	32:40

Team	Category	Player	Statistics
Kansas State	Passing	Avery Johnson	11/17, 231 yards, 2 TD
Kansas State	Rushing	Joe Jackson	20 carries, 69 yards
Kansas State	Receiving	Jayce Brown	4 receptions, 160 yards, TD
Kansas	Passing	Jalon Daniels	17/35, 129 yards, INT
Kansas	Rushing	Daniel Hishaw Jr.	19 carries, 67 yards, TD
Kansas	Receiving	Cam Pickett	6 receptions, 40 yards

=== vs No. 13 Texas Tech ===
No. 13 Texas Tech Red Raiders (7–1) at Kansas State Wildcats (4–4) – Game summary

Quarter	1	2	3	4	Total
No. 13 Red Raiders	0	12	17	14	43
Wildcats	7	0	7	6	20

at Bill Snyder Family Football Stadium • Manhattan, Kansas

- Date: November 1
- Game time: 2:30 p.m.
- Game weather: Cloudy, 48 °F (9 °C)
- Game attendance: 52,111
- Referee: Tuta Salaam
- TV announcers (FOX): Jason Benetti (play-by-play), Robert Griffin III (analyst), and Alexa Landestoy (sideline)

Game information
First quarter
- KSU – Avery Johnson 46-yard run (Luis Rodriguez kick), 7:39. Wildcats 7–0. Drive: 5 plays, 80 yards, 2:53.

Second quarter

- TTU – Stone Harrington 29-yard field goal, 6:31. Wildcats 7–3. Drive: 12 plays, 79 yards, 5:32.
- TTU – Cameron Dickey 1-yard run (kick failed), 3:45. Red Raiders 9–7. Drive: 5 plays, 19 yards, 2:00.
- TTU – Stone Harrington 55-yard field goal, 0:00. Red Raiders 12–7. Drive: 7 plays, 11 yards, 1:52.

Third quarter

- TTU – J'Koby Williams 41-yard run (Stone Harrington kick), 12:54. Red Raiders 19–7. Drive: 3 plays, 49 yards, 0:53.
- KSU – Avery Johnson 18-yard run (Luis Rodriguez kick), 9:51. Red Raiders 19–14. Drive: 6 plays, 75 yards, 3:03.
- TTU – Stone Harrington 29-yard field goal, 6:35. Red Raiders 22–14. Drive: 7 plays, 63 yards, 3:16.
- TTU – Caleb Douglas 1-yard pass from Behren Morton (Stone Harrington kick), 1:23. Red Raiders 29–14. Drive: 7 plays, 74 yards, 3:07.

Fourth quarter

- KSU – Garrett Oakley 9-yard pass from Avery Johnson (pass failed), 12:44. Red Raiders 29–20. Drive: 8 plays, 75 yards, 3:39.
- TTU – John Curry 10-yard fumble return (Stone Harrington kick), 4:52. Red Raiders 36–20.
- TTU – Caleb Douglas 19-yard pass from Behren Morton (Stone Harrington kick), 2:54. Red Raiders 43–20. Drive: 3 plays, 24 yards, 1:34.

Statistics	TTU	KSU
First downs	18	11
Plays–yards	76–436	63–325
Rushes–yards	44–187	30–126
Passing yards	249	199
Passing: comp–att–int	21–32–1	16–33–2
Turnovers	2	5
Time of possession	33:24	26:36

Team	Category	Player	Statistics
Texas Tech	Passing	Behren Morton	21/32, 249 yards, 2 TD, INT
Texas Tech	Rushing	J'Koby Williams	17 carries, 135 yards, TD
Texas Tech	Receiving	Caleb Douglas	8 receptions, 82 yards, 2 TD
Kansas State	Passing	Avery Johnson	16/33, 199 yards, TD, 2 INT
Kansas State	Rushing	Avery Johnson	15 carries, 88 yards, 2 TD
Kansas State	Receiving	Garrett Oakley	5 receptions, 62 yards, TD

=== at Oklahoma State ===
Kansas State Wildcats (4–5) at Oklahoma State Cowboys (1–8) – Game summary

Quarter	1	2	3	4	Total
Wildcats	0	7	0	7	14
Cowboys	3	3	0	0	6

at Boone Pickens Stadium • Stillwater, Oklahoma

- Date: November 15
- Game time: 11:00 a.m.
- Game weather: Sunny • Temperature: 77 °F (25 °C) • Wind: SW at 17 mph (27 km/h)
- Game attendance: 46,340
- Referee: Kevin Boitmann
- TV announcers (ESPNU): Richard Cross (play-by-play) and Charles Arbuckle (analyst)

Game information

First quarter

- (8:37) OKST – Logan Ward 47-yard field goal (Drive: 8 plays, 39 yards, 3:49; OKST 3–0)

Second quarter

- (14:55) OKST – Logan Ward 47-yard field goal (Drive: 9 plays, 54 yards, 4:09; OKST 6–0)
- (7:07) KSU – Jayce Brown 34-yard pass from Avery Johnson, Luis Rodriguez kick (Drive: 4 plays, 48 yards, 1:28; KSU 7–6)

Third quarter

- No scoring plays.

Fourth quarter

- (12:31) KSU – Joe Jackson 15-yard run, Luis Rodriguez kick (Drive: 10 plays, 70 yards, 4:05; KSU 14–6)

Statistics	KSU	OKST
First downs	14	23
Plays–yards	58–284	67–373
Rushes–yards	30–107	29–147
Passing yards	177	266
Passing: comp–att–int	15–28–1	25–38–3
Turnovers	1	5
Time of possession	29:27	30:33

Team	Category	Player	Statistics
Kansas State	Passing	Avery Johnson	15/28, 177 yards, TD, INT
Kansas State	Rushing	Joe Jackson	14 carries, 69 yards, TD
Kansas State	Receiving	Jayce Brown	3 receptions, 82 yards, TD
Oklahoma State	Passing	Zane Flores	24/36, 233 yards, 2 INT
Oklahoma State	Rushing	Rodney Fields Jr.	14 carries, 51 yards
Oklahoma State	Receiving	Terrill Davis	4 receptions, 55 yards

=== at No. 12 Utah ===
Kansas State Wildcats (5–5) at No. 12 Utah Utes (8–2) – Game summary

Quarter	1	2	3	4	Total
Wildcats	7	24	7	9	47
No. 12 Utes	7	14	14	16	51

at Rice–Eccles Stadium • Salt Lake City, Utah

- Date: November 22
- Game time: 3:00 p.m.
- Game weather: 47, Sunny, Wind NW 5 mph
- Game attendance: 51,444
- Referee: Stephen Baron
- TV announcers (ESPN2): Dave Flemming (play-by-play), Brock Osweiler (analyst) and Stormy Buonantony (sideline)

Game information

First quarter

- KSU – Antonio Martin Jr. 37-yard run (Luis Rodriguez kick), 8:29. Wildcats 7–0. Drive: 6 plays, 85 yards, 3:18
- UTAH – Byrd Ficklin 10-yard run (Dillon Curtis kick), 4:48. Tied 7–7. Drive: 9 plays, 70 yards, 3:32

Second quarter

- KSU – Avery Johnson 4-yard run (Luis Rodriguez kick), 14:54. Wildcats 14–7. Drive: 8 plays, 75 yards, 4:54
- UTAH – Byrd Ficklin 6-yard run (Dillon Curtis kick), 11:11. Tied 14–14. Drive: 11 plays, 75 yards, 3:43
- KSU – Joe Jackson 66-yard run (Luis Rodriguez kick), 9:07. Wildcats 21–14. Drive: 4 plays, 75 yards, 2:04
- UTAH – Devon Dampier 8-yard run (Dillon Curtis kick), 6:51. Tied 21–21. Drive: 6 plays, 75 yards, 2:16
- KSU – Luis Rodriguez 22-yard field goal, 4:32. Wildcats 24–21. Drive: 7 plays, 70 yards, 2:19
- KSU – Joe Jackson 80-yard (Luis Rodriguez kick), 1:17. Wildcats 31–21. Drive: 1 play, 80 yards, 0:14

Third quarter

- UTAH – Dallen Bentley 38-yard pass from Devon Dampier (Dillon Curtis kick), 13:49. Wildcats 31–28. Drive: 4 plays, 75 yards, 1:11
- UTAH – Byrd Ficklin 10-yard run (Dillon Curtis kick), 10:03, Utes 35–31. Drive: 7 plays, 66 yards, 2:47
- KSU – Garrett Oakley 2-yard pass from Avery Johnson (Luis Rodriguez kick), 1:44. Wildcats 38–35. Drive: 14 plays, 79 yards, 8:15

Fourth quarter

- KSU – Luis Rodriguez 36-yard field goal, 8:51. Wildcats 41–35. Drive: 13 plays, 59 yards, 6:15
- KSU – Joe Jackson 24-yard run (pass failed), 7:00. Wildcats 47–35. Drive: 3 plays, 26 yards, 0:41
- UTAH – Tao Johnson defensive PAT conversion from 99-yard interception return, 7:00. Wildcats 47–37. Drive: 3 plays, 26 yards, 0:41
- UTAH – Larry Simmons 20-yard pass from Devon Dampier (Dillon Curtis kick), 2:47. Wildcats 47–44. Drive: 12 plays, 75 yards, 4:13
- UTAH – Devon Dampier 1-yard run (Dillon Curtis Kick), 0:56. Utes 51–47. Drive: 7 plays, 70 yards, 1:29

Statistics	KSU	UTAH
First downs	21	32
Plays–yards	65-574	84-551
Rushes–yards	42-472	50-292
Passing yards	102	259
Passing: comp–att–int	12-23-1	18-34-0
Turnovers	1	1
Time of possession	30:56	29:04

Team	Category	Player	Statistics
Kansas State	Passing	Avery Johnson	12/23, 102 yards, TD, INT
Kansas State	Rushing	Joe Jackson	24 carries, 293 yards, 3 TD
Kansas State	Receiving	Jaron Tibbs	6 receptions, 45 yards
Utah	Passing	Devon Dampier	18/33, 259 yards, 2 TD
Utah	Rushing	Devon Dampier	14 carries, 94 yards, 2 TD
Utah	Receiving	JJ Buchanan	2 receptions, 74 yards

=== vs Colorado (rivalry) ===
Colorado Buffaloes (3-8) at Kansas State Wildcats (5-6) – Game summary

Quarter	1	2	3	4	Total
Buffaloes	0	7	0	7	14
Wildcats	7	0	7	10	24

at Bill Snyder Family Football Stadium • Manhattan, Kansas

- Date: November 29
- Game time: 11:00 a.m. CST
- Game weather: Cloudy, 32 °F (0 °C), Wind NW 16 mph
- Game attendance: 49,549
- Referee: Luke Richmond
- TV announcers (FS1): Eric Collins (play-by-play) and Spencer Tillman (analyst)

Game information

First quarter

- (7:40) KSU – Joe Jackson 4-yard run, Luis Rodriguez kick (Drive: 13 plays, 74 yards, 7:13; Kansas State 7–0)

Second quarter

- (0:18) COL – Micah Welch 1-yard run, Alejandro Mata kick (Drive: 11 plays, 84 yards, 2:03; Tied 7–7)

Third quarter

- (4:32) KSU – Joe Jackson 1-yard run, Luis Rodriguez kick (Drive: 6 plays, 56 yards, 2:52; Kansas State 14–7)

Fourth quarter

- (10:23) KSU – Luis Rodriguez 35-yard field goal (Drive: 15 plays, 61 yards, 6:43; Kansas State 17–7)
- (7:03) COL – Micah Welch 1-yard run, Alejandro Mata kick (Drive: 9 plays, 75 yards, 3:20; Kansas State 17–14)
- (2:37) KSU – Joe Jackson 17-yard run, Luis Rodriguez kick (Drive: 8 plays, 75 yards, 4:26; Kansas State 24–14)

Statistics	COLO	KSU
First downs	18	16
Plays–yards	72-323	60-321
Rushes–yards	47-151	43-206
Passing yards	172	115
Passing: comp–att–int	14-25-1	10-17-0
Turnovers	1	0
Time of possession	29:23	30:37

Team	Category	Player	Statistics
Colorado	Passing	Kaidon Salter	14/25, 172 yards, INT
Colorado	Rushing	Kaidon Salter	15 carries, 63 yards
Colorado	Receiving	Omarion Miller	7 receptions, 120 yards
Kansas State	Passing	Avery Johnson	10/17, 115 yards
Kansas State	Rushing	Joe Jackson	26 carries, 142 yards, 3 TD
Kansas State	Receiving	Jaron Tibbs	4 receptions, 55 yards

== Personnel ==
=== Coaching staff ===
Name	Position	Year at Kansas State	Previous job
Chris Klieman	Head coach	7th	North Dakota State (HC)
Matt Wells	OC/QB/AHC	2nd	Oklahoma (Advisor to HC/O Analyst)
Van Malone	AHC/DPGC/CB	7th	Mississippi State (DA)
Joe Klanderman	DC/S	7th	North Dakota State (DB)
Brian Anderson	RB	7th	Illinois State (WR)
Brian Lepak	OL	5th	Southern (RGC/OL)
Matthew Middleton	WR	3rd	Kent State (WR/RC)
Steve Stanard	LB	6th	Syracuse (DE)
Mike Tuiasosopo	DT	7th	UTEP (DL)
Luke Wells	TE	1st	Bixby HS (OK) (assistant)
Buddy Wyatt	DE	7th	Kansas (senior analyst)
Ray Thomas	Strength/Cond.	5th	South Florida (Asst. S&C)
Nate Kaczor	STC/SATHC	2nd	Washington Commanders (ST)
Matt Kardulis	A-S	5th	Virginia Tech (GA)
Drew Liddle	A-OL	8th	UTEP (TE/FB)
Sean Maguire	A-QB	2nd	Buffalo (DA/QC)
David Orloff	OLB	5th	Syracuse (GA)

=== Roster ===
2025 roster
Quarterbacks: 2 Avery Johnson – Jr.; 7 Jacob Knuth – Jr.; 10 Dillon Duff – Fr.; 13 Blake Barnett – (redshirt) Fr.; 18 Hudson Hutcheson – (redshirt) Fr.; Running backs: 3 Dylan Edwards – Jr.; 4 Joe Jackson – So.; 22 Antonio Martin Jr. – Jr.; 23 DeVon Rice - (redshirt) Fr.; 24 JB Price - (redshirt) Fr.; 31 Monterrio Elston Jr. - Fr.; Wide receivers: 1 Jayce Brown – Jr.; 5 Jerand Bradley – Sr.; 6 Sterling Lockett – Jr.; 9 Jacques Spradley-Demps – (redshirt) Fr.; 12 Jaron Tibbs – Jr.; 14 Jemyri Davis – Jr.; 15 Callen Barta – (redshirt) Fr.; 17 Adonis Moise – Fr.; 19 Garrett Harstand – So.; 21 Bryce Noernberg – (redshirt) Fr.; 27 Ben Wheeler – (redshirt) Fr.; 82 Justin Stephens – Jr.; 84 Isaac Koch – Jr.; 85 Larry Porter IV – Fr.; 88 Caleb Medford – Sr.; Tight ends: 0 Linkon Cure – Fr.; 80 Will Anciaux – So.; 81 Andrew Metzger – So.; 83 Will Swanson – Sr.; 86 Garrett Oakley – Jr.; 87 Brayden Loftin – Jr.	Offensive line: 50 Brock Heath – Fr.; 53 Drake Bequeaith – Jr.; 54 JB Nelson – Sr.; 55 Kyle Rakers – (redshirt) Fr.; 56 Andrew Leingang – Sr.; 58 Will Kemna – Fr.; 59 George Fitzpatrick – Jr.; 64 Navarro Schunke – (redshirt) Fr.; 66 Michael Capria – Jr.; 68 Joe Vickers – So.; 69 Taylor Portier -Sr.; 70 Gus Hawkins – (redshirt) Fr.; 71 Dylan Villaroul – Fr.; 73 Kaedin Massey – (redshirt) Fr.; 74 Terrence Enos Jr. – Sr.; 75 Sam Hecht – Sr.; 77 Amos Talalele – So.; 78 John Pastore – Jr.; 79 Devin Vass – So.; Long snappers: 16 Mason Olguin – Sr.; 33 Andrew Johnson – So.; Defensive ends: 8 Chiddi Obiazor – So.; 15 Jayshawn Ross – (redshirt) Fr.; 39 Travis Bates – Jr.; 44 Tobi Osunsanmi – Jr.; 47 Cody Stufflebean – Sr.; 52 Ryan Davis – So.; 90 Brad Stanyer – Fr.; 91 Jordan Allen – So.; 92 Truman Griffith – (redshirt) Fr.; Defensive Tackles: 55 Malcolm Alcorn-Crowder – Jr.; 56 Damian Ilalio – Sr.; 75 Holden Bass – (redshirt) Fr.; 93 Asher Tomaszewski – So.; 95 Patrick Tackie – Jr.; 99 Uso Seumalo – Sr.	Linebackers: 20 Ralph Ortiz – Jr.; 23 Asa Newsom – So.; 26 Sawyer Schilke – Fr.; 28 Rex Van Wyhe – Jr.; 32 Desmond Purnell – Sr.; 34 Weston Polk – Fr.; 35 Gabe Powers – Jr.; 41 Ashton Moore – Fr.; 45 Austin Romaine – Jr.; 46 Darien Whitaker Jr. – Fr.; 48 Zach Wittenberg – Sr.; 49 Maguire Richman – Fr.; 57 Beau Palmer – Sr.; Cornerbacks: 0 Amarion Fortenberry – So.; 1 Jayden Rowe – Jr.; 5 Justice Clemons – Sr.; 9 Donovan McIntosh – So.; 12 Serious Stinyard – Fr.; 21 JoJo Scott – Fr.; 24 Martel Jackson – Fr.; 25 Zashon Rich – So.; 29 Kanijal Thomas – So.; Safeties: 2 Colby McCalister – Jr.; 3 Gunner Maldonado – Sr.; 4 Daniel Cobbs – Jr.; 6 Qua Moss – Jr.; 7 VJ Payne – Sr.; 10 Logan Bartley – Fr.; 13 RJ Collins – Fr.; 14 Jet Dineen – Jr.; 17 Mikey Bergeron – So.; 18 Wesley Fair – So.; 22 Jace Adler – Fr.; 31 Dominic Mitchell – Fr.; 36 Jack Fabris – So.; Punters/kickers: 8 Simon McClannan – So.; 27 Cub Patton – Fr.; 30 Teagan Cobb – So.; 43 Luis Rodriguez - So.; 96 Leyton Simmering - Jr.

=== Transfers ===
==== Outgoing transfers ====
Kansas State Outgoing transfers
Name	Pos.	College transferred to
Logan Cox	OL	Old Dominion
Trey Krause	S	Bryant
Jackson Voth	WR	Drake
Joe Hall III	CB	Northern Iowa
Andre Davis	WR	TBD
Jake Stonebraker	LB	Austin Peay
Kaden McMahan	LB	TBD
Brandon Sneh	OL	UAB
Noah King	OL	Colorado
Brock Woolf	OL	South Dakota
Zayden Martinez	WR	Central Oklahoma
Arrion Concepcion	WR	James Madison
Trae Davis	WR	Prairie View A&M
Keagan Johnson	WR	New Mexico
Nickendre Stiger	S	Old Dominion
Dante Thomas	S	Coastal Carolina
Alec Marenco	LB	Wake Forest
Donovan Rieman	DE	Louisiana Tech
Erwin Nash	WR	Northwest Missouri State
Carver Willis	OL	Washington
Tre Spivey III	WR	Arizona
Terry Kirksey Jr.	LB	UConn
Darell Jones	CB	Fort Hays State
Ta'Quan Roberson	QB	Buffalo
Justin Wolf	TE	Western Kentucky
Kam Sallis	LB	Jackson State
Jordan Dunbar	CB	Bowling Green
La'James White	RB	Abilene Christian

† Note: Players with a dash in the new school column didn't land on a new team for the 2025 season.

==== Incoming transfers ====
Kansas State Incoming transfers
Name	Pos.	Previous school
Antonio Martin Jr.	RB	Louisiana–Monroe
Terrence Enos Jr.	OL	Pittsburgh
JB Nelson	OL	Penn State
George Fitzpatrick	OL	Ohio State
Jayshawn Ross	DE	Alabama
Amarion Fortenberry	CB	South Alabama
Ralph Ortiz	LB	West Florida
Gunner Maldonado	S	Arizona
Jayden Rowe	CB	Oklahoma
Qua Moss	S	West Georgia
Jerand Bradley	WR	Boston College
Caleb Medford	WR	New Mexico
Jaron Tibbs	WR	Purdue
Amos Talalele	OL	USC
Brandon Sneh	OL	Wagner
Gabe Powers	LB	Ohio State
Gabe Ervin Jr.	OL	Nebraska
