= Wayne Gandy =

American football player (born 1971)

No. 68, 70, 72
- Position: Offensive tackle

Personal information
- Born: February 10, 1971 (age 55); Haines City, Florida, U.S.
- Listed height: 6 ft 5 in (1.96 m)
- Listed weight: 315 lb (143 kg)

Career information
- High school: Haines City
- College: Auburn
- NFL draft: 1994: 1st round, 15th overall pick

Career history
- Los Angeles / St. Louis Rams (1994–1998); Pittsburgh Steelers (1999–2002); New Orleans Saints (2003–2005); Atlanta Falcons (2006–2008)

Awards and highlights
- Consensus All-American (1993)

Career NFL statistics
- Games played: 219
- Games started: 205
- Fumble recoveries: 2
- Stats at Pro Football Reference

Wayne Lamar Gandy (born February 10, 1971) is an American former professional football player who was an offensive tackle in the National Football League (NFL) for fifteen seasons. He played college football for Auburn University, and earned consensus All-American honors. He was selected by the Los Angeles Rams in the first round of the 1994 NFL draft, and he also played professionally for the Pittsburgh Steelers, New Orleans Saints and Atlanta Falcons of the NFL.

== Early life ==
Gandy was born in Haines City, Florida. He attended Haines City High School, and played for the Haines City Hornets high school football team.

== College career ==
Gandy attended Auburn University, where he played for coach Pat Dye and coach Terry Bowden's Auburn Tigers football teams from 1990 to 1993. As a senior, he was a member of the undefeated 1993 Auburn Tigers football team, and was recognized as a consensus first-team All-American.

== Professional career ==
The Los Angeles Rams selected Gandy as the 15th overall pick (1st round) of the 1994 NFL draft. He played for the Rams for five seasons from 1994 to 1998.

Gandy spent four seasons with the Pittsburgh Steelers from 1999 to 2002.

On March 2, 2003, Gandy signed a six-year deal with New Orleans Saints. After three seasons with the Saints, he was traded to the Atlanta Falcons on April 7, 2006, for safety Bryan Scott and a draft pick.

For the 2007 season, Gandy was named as one of the Falcons' team captains. On October 7 against the Tennessee Titans, Gandy suffered a torn anterior cruciate ligament in his left knee, causing him to miss the remainder of the season.

On February 15, 2008, the Falcons released him. He was re-signed on October 29 after an injury to offensive tackle Sam Baker. He was not re-signed by the Falcons during the 2009 offseason.

== Broadcasting career ==
In late 2001 Gandy was asked by WSB-Radio Atlanta to record some vignettes for its "I Am Atlanta" campaign. After the success of the ads, he was encouraged to pursue a career in broadcasting. He started his own syndication company (The Gandy Group) and launched "The Sports Joc Show with Wayne Gandy". The syndicated three hour show broadcasts from Atlanta and intermingles Sports and Entertainment. The show is currently available for broadcast live or replay and has a live video feed at http://www.TheSportsJoc.com

Wayne Gandy hosted a weekly TV show for CBS-Atlanta Sports' SEC Show with Guy Rawlings from 2011 to 2012, and is currently a Color Analyst for ESPN TV (2013–present)
