= Vince Williams (American football) =

American football player (born 1989)

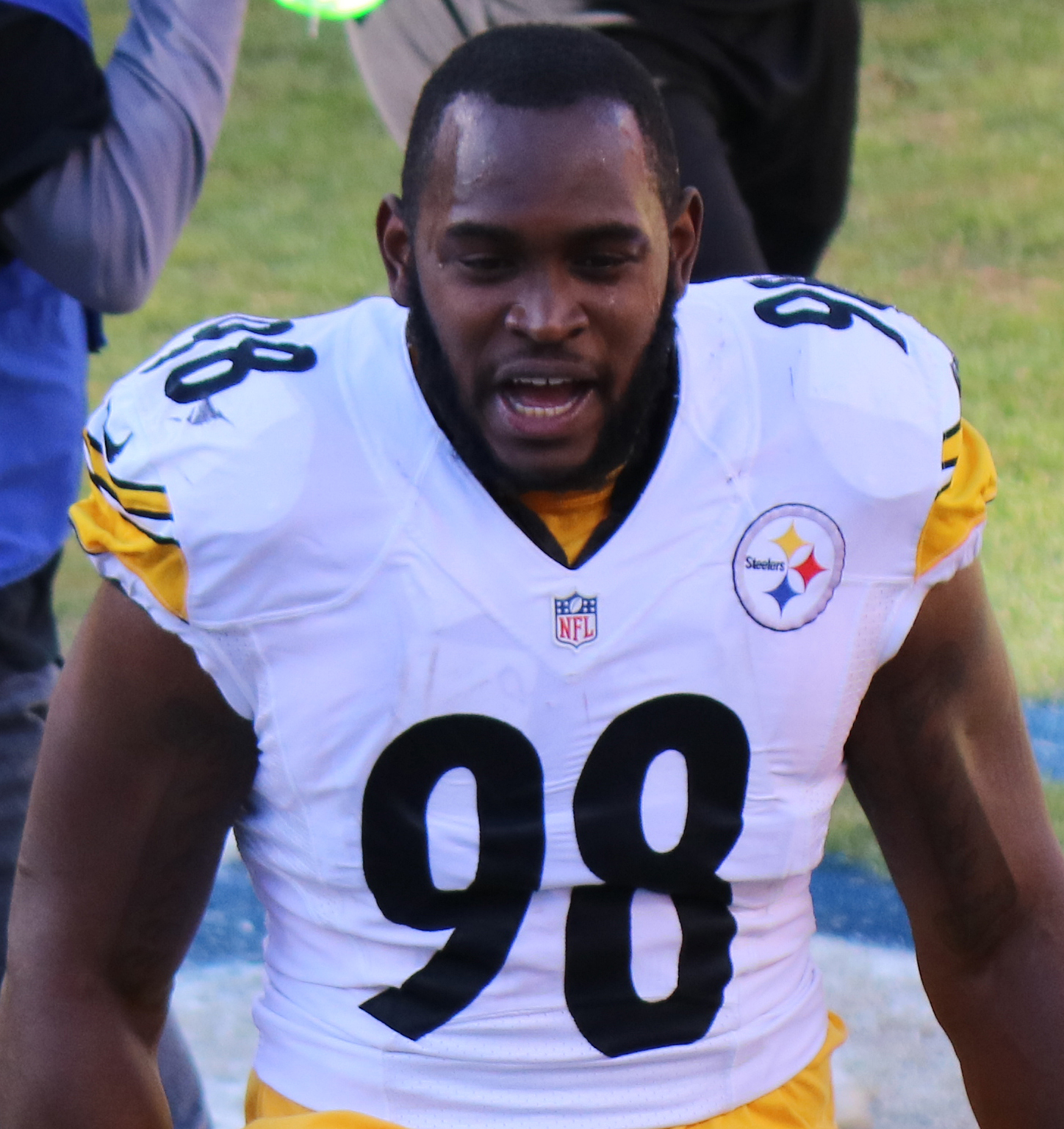
- Williams with the Pittsburgh Steelers in 2016

No. 98
- Position: Linebacker

Personal information
- Born: December 27, 1989 (age 36); Davenport, Florida, U.S.
- Listed height: 6 ft 1 in (1.85 m)
- Listed weight: 233 lb (106 kg)

Career information
- High school: Ridge Community (Davenport)
- College: Florida State
- NFL draft: 2013: 6th round, 206th overall pick

Career history
- Pittsburgh Steelers (2013–2020)

Career NFL statistics
- Total tackles: 479
- Sacks: 20.5
- Interceptions: 2
- Passes defended: 5
- Fumble recoveries: 6
- Defensive touchdowns: 1
- Stats at Pro Football Reference

Vincenzo Jerard Williams (born December 27, 1989) is an American former professional football player who spent his entire career as a linebacker for the Pittsburgh Steelers of the National Football League (NFL). He was selected by the Steelers in the sixth round of the 2013 NFL draft after playing college football for the Florida State Seminoles.

== Early life ==
Williams played high school football for Ridge Community High School and was one of the state's top linebackers. He was teammates with Mike James. Williams was named Polk County Defensive Player of the Year as a junior and 3A second-team All-State honors as a senior. He amassed almost 300 tackles with 48 tackles for loss and 25 sacks over three varsity seasons.

Regarded as a four-star recruit by Rivals.com, Williams was ranked as the No. 10 inside linebacker prospect in his class. He was also co-MVP of the Scout.com combine in Jacksonville. Highly recruited, Williams chose Florida State over Louisiana State, Ohio State, and Florida.

== College career ==
Williams graduated early from high school and enrolled at Florida State University in January 2008. He was the back-up at middle linebacker, behind upper-classmen Derek Nicholson and Dekoda Watson, and saw action in every game except the win at Miami (FL). He finished the year with 10 tackles, second among freshmen, behind only Nigel Bradham. For most of his would-be sophomore season, Williams battled a back injury, though he returned to the practice field over the final month of the regular season. He was eventually granted a medical redshirt.

As a redshirt sophomore in 2010, Williams earned playing time behind senior Kendall Smith at middle linebacker after enjoying an outstanding spring practice. In the season-opener against Samford, he posted a season-high five tackles (four solos). He ended the season with 17 total tackles, while participating in 11 of 14 games.

In his junior season, Williams replaced Smith in the starting line-up at middle linebacker. He ranked fifth on the team with 54 tackles (30 solo, 24 assisted) and also added five tackles for loss, two sacks, one interception and three pass break-ups. In the 2011 Champs Sports Bowl win over Notre Dame, Williams recorded five tackles. He received one of two awards for best attitude on the defense at the team's annual banquet.

Starting all 14 games at middle linebacker in his senior season, Williams helped Florida State's defense lead the nation in yards allowed per play (3.86) and rank second nationally in total defense (254.14 ypg). He finished fourth on the team with 59 tackles, while recording five or more tackles in seven of his 14 games. One of his best games came in a road win at Virginia Tech, recording five tackles, a tackle for loss, two quarterback hurries and a fumble recovery. Williams ended his college career with a career-high 10 tackles in the 2013 Orange Bowl win over Northern Illinois which included his first sack of the season.

== Professional career ==
=== Pre-draft ===
Coming out of Florida State, Williams was projected by analysts to be a sixth or seventh round selection. He was rated as the ninth best inside linebacker in the 2013 NFL Draft. He was not invited to the NFL Scouting Combine but was able to participate in Florida State's annual Pro Day on March 19, 2013.

Pre-draft measurables
Height	Weight	Arm length	Hand span	40-yard dash	10-yard split	20-yard split	20-yard shuttle	Three-cone drill	Vertical jump	Broad jump	Bench press
6 ft 0 3/4 in (1.85 m)	233 lb (106 kg)	31 1/2 in (0.80 m)	9 1/8 in (0.23 m)	4.76 s	1.71 s	2.76 s	4.67 s	7.53 s	32.5 in (0.83 m)	9 ft 3 in (2.82 m)	22 reps
All values from Florida State's Pro Day

=== 2013 ===
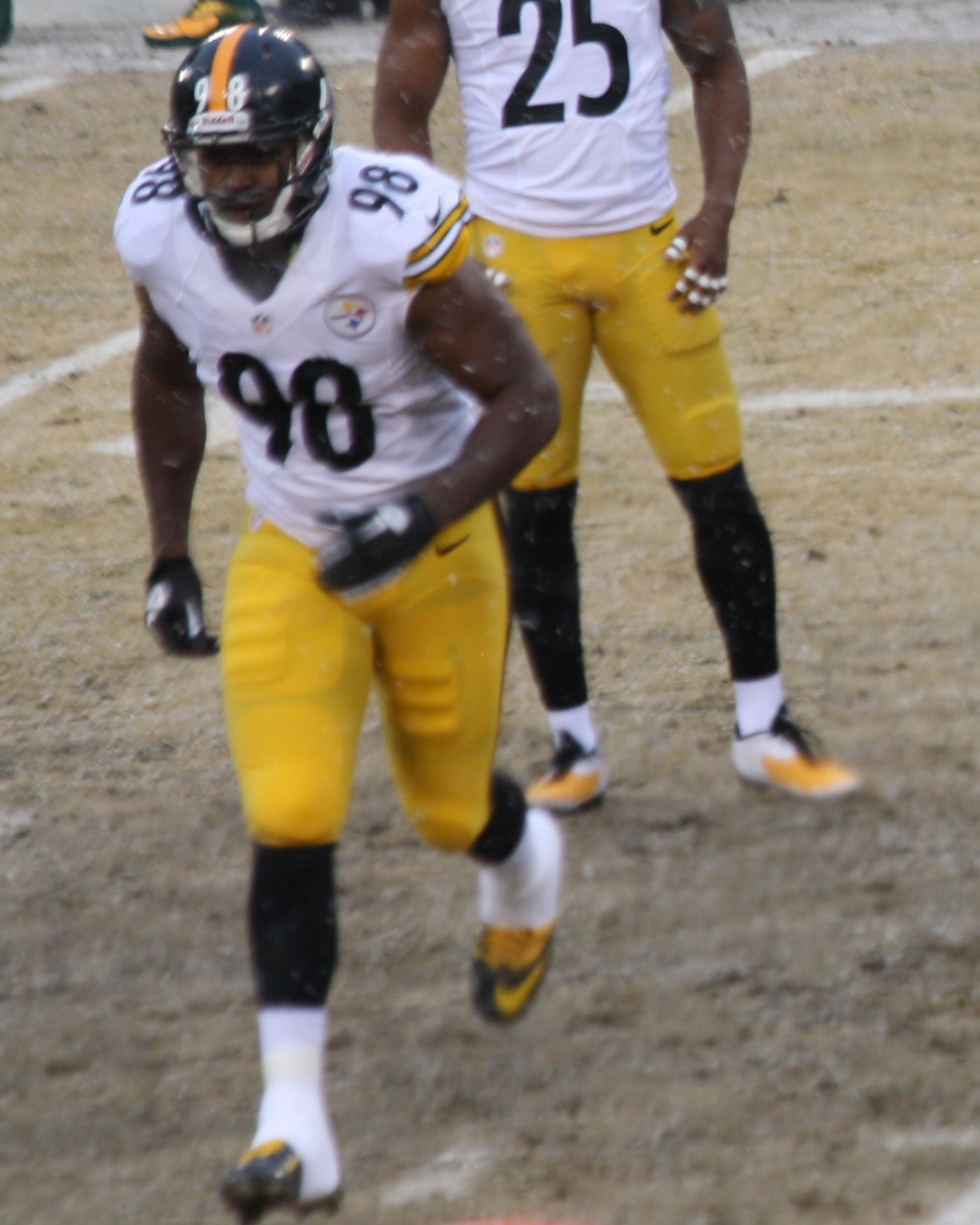
Williams in 2013

The Pittsburgh Steelers selected Williams in the sixth round (206th overall) of the 2013 NFL draft. Williams was the 22nd linebacker drafted in 2013.

On May 20, 2013, the Pittsburgh Steelers signed him to a four-year, $2.23 million contract that includes a signing bonus of $78,680.

After the release of Stevenson Sylvester, Williams was moved up the depth chart as primary backup at left inside linebacker to Larry Foote. Foote suffered a torn bicep in Week 1 against the Titans, and the Steelers went through multiple starters until Williams started 10 of the last 11 games.

He made his professional regular-season debut in the Steelers' season opener against the Tennessee Titans and played only on special teams. The following game, he made a season-high seven combined tackles in the Steelers' 10–20 loss to the Cincinnati Bengals. On September 29, 2013, Williams earned his first career start during a 34–27 loss to the Minnesota Vikings and finished with five solo tackles. On December 15, 2013, he made a season-high six solo tackles during a 30–20 win over the Bengals. Williams finished his rookie season with a total of 53 combined tackles and 40 solo tackles in 15 games and 11 starts.

=== 2014 ===
The following season, he began as the backup left inside linebacker to rookie Ryan Shazier but was moved to the backup right inside linebacker to Lawrence Timmons a few weeks into the season.

He appeared on a special teams throughout the season and registered his first tackle during a Week 5 contest against the Jacksonville Jaguars. Williams finished the 17–9 victory with three combined tackles. During Week 8, he made a season-high six solo tackles against the Indianapolis Colts. On November 9, 2014, he had his first start of the season against the New York Jets and made four combined tackles during the Steelers' 13–20 loss. The following game, Williams racked up seven tackles during a 27–24 victory at the Tennessee Titans. On December 14, 2014, Williams collected a season-high seven combined tackles in the Steelers' 27–20 defeat of the Atlanta Falcons. He finished his second season with a total of 43 combined tackles and 28 solo tackles while starting three games and playing in all 16.

On January 3, 2015, he played in his first career playoff game when the Steelers played the Baltimore Ravens in the Wild Card round. Williams finished with a total of two tackles during the Steelers' 30–17 loss.

=== 2015 ===
He returned in 2015 as a rotational inside linebacker. On November 29, he had a season-high seven combined tackles and six solo tackles during the Steelers' 30–39 loss to the Seattle Seahawks. During Week 14, he made five combined tackles and made his first career sack on Cincinnati Bengals' quarterback A. J. McCarron. On January 9, 2016, Williams made three solo tackles during a wildcard victory over the Bengals. He finished 2015 with 43 total tackles and 34 solo tackles, and was given credit for half a sack while appearing in 16 games and starting none.

=== 2016 ===
On August 23, 2016, the Pittsburgh Steelers signed Williams to a three-year, $5.50 million extension with a $1.50 million signing bonus.

Williams resumed 2016 as the backup inside linebacker and earned his first start of the season on October 2, 2016, against the Kansas City Chiefs after Ryan Shazier suffered an injury. He finished the 43–14 victory with a career-high 16 combined tackles (14 solo) and sacked Chief's quarterback Alex Smith for his first career solo sack. The following game, during a 31–13 victory over the Jets, Williams made nine combined tackles and sacked New York Jets' quarterback Ryan Fitzpatrick. He started four games in place of Shazier and played effectively in his absence before returning to his rotational role. He finished the season with a career-high 47 combined tackles and two sacks in four starts and 16 games.

=== 2017 ===
Williams entered training camp slated as a starting inside linebacker after Lawrence Timmons was not re-signed by the Steelers and departed during free agency. Head coach Mike Tomlin named Williams and Ryan Shazier the starting inside linebackers to begin the regular season. They started alongside outside linebackers Bud Dupree and T. J. Watt.

On October 15, 2017, Williams recorded five solo tackles and made a career-high two sacks on Chiefs’ quarterback Alex Smith during a 19–13 win at the Kansas City Chirfs in Week 6. In Week 14, he collected a season-high nine combined tackles and made one sack during a 23–20 win at the Cincinnati Bengals. On December 17, 2017, Williams made three solo tackles, a pass deflection, and his first career interception as the Steelers lost 27–24 against the New England Patriots in Week 15. Williams intercepted a pass by Patriots’ quarterback Tom Brady, that was initially intended for tight end Rob Gronkowski, and returned it for a 13-yard gain during the third quarter. Williams started in all 16 games in 2017 and made a career-high 89 combined tackles (69 solo), a career-high eight sacks, one interception, and one pass deflection.

=== 2018 ===
On August 23, 2018, the Pittsburgh Steelers signed Williams to a three-year, $18.60 million contract extension that included $6.70 million guaranteed and a signing bonus of $6.40 million. Williams returned as a starting inside linebacker and was paired with Jon Bostic who replaced Ryan Shazier due to a possible career-ending spinal contusion.

He started in the Pittsburgh Steelers’ season-opener at the Cleveland Browns and collected a season-high 12 combined tackles (four solo) during their 21–21 tie. Williams was inactive for the Steelers’ Week 5 victory against the Atlanta Falcons due to a hamstring injury. This became his first missed game of his five-year career. On November 8, 2018, Williams made four combined tackles, one pass deflection, one sack, and returned an interception for his first career touchdown during a 52–21 win against Carolina Panthers in Week 10. Williams intercepted a pass by Cam Newton, that was intended for wide receiver Devin Funchess, and returned it for a 17-yard touchdown during the first quarter. Williams was inactive for the Steelers’ Week 17 victory against the Cincinnati Bengals due to a foot injury. Williams finished the season with 76 combined tackles (50 solo), 4.5 sacks, two pass deflections, one interception, and one touchdown in 14 games and 14 starts. He received an overall grade of 65.7 from Pro Football Focus, which ranked as the 41st best grade among all linebackers in 2018.

=== 2019 ===
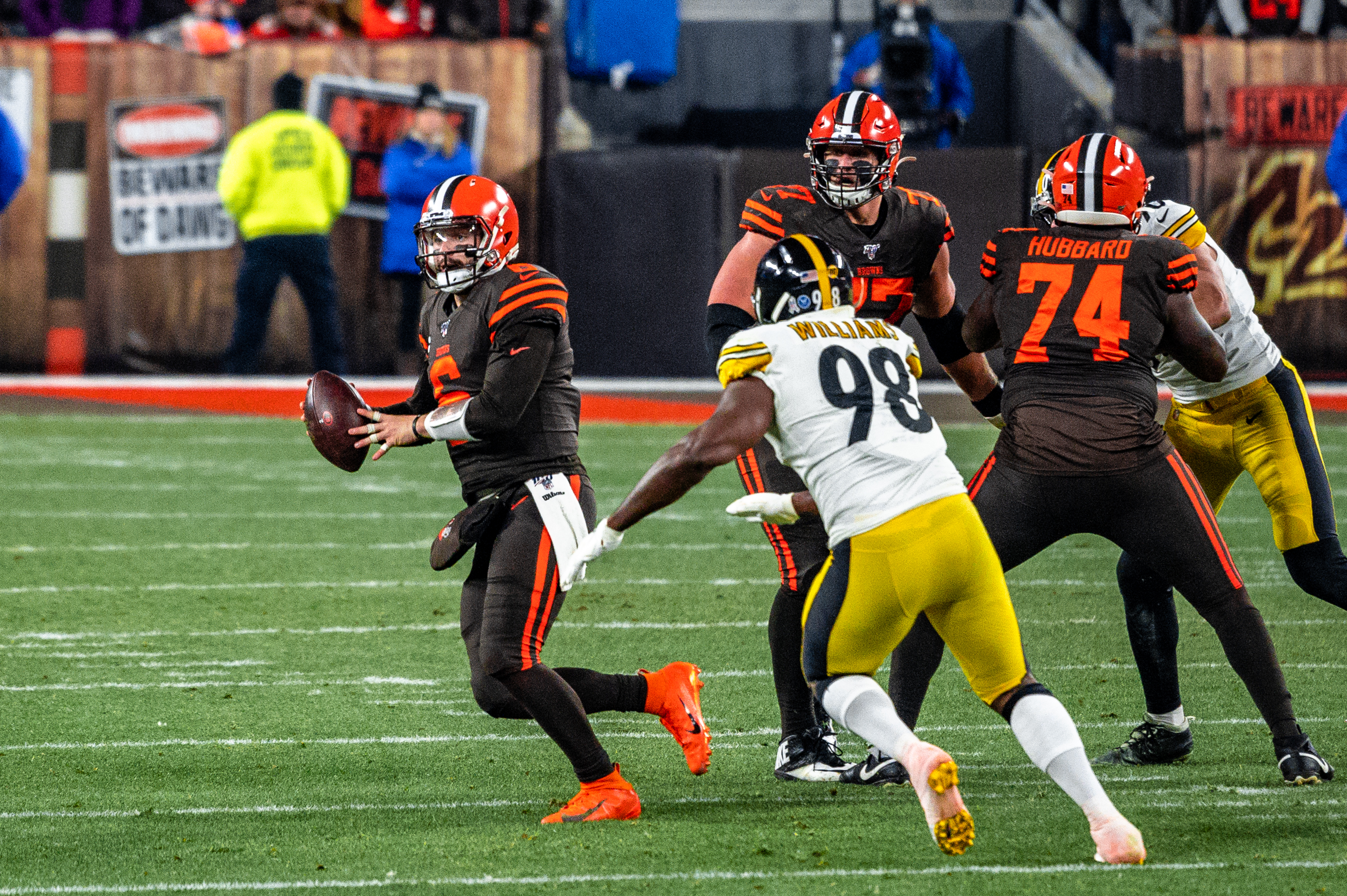
Williams chasing Baker Mayfield in 2019

In week 2 against the Seattle Seahawks, Williams recorded 2 tackles before exiting with a hamstring injury. Without Williams, the Steelers lost 28–26. Williams made his return from injury in week 5 against the Baltimore Ravens. In the game, Williams recorded a team high 9 tackles and sacked Lamar Jackson once in the 26–23 loss.

=== 2020 ===
In Week 7 against the Tennessee Titans, Williams led the team with 10 tackles (8 solo) and sacked Ryan Tannehill once during the 27–24 win. He was placed on the reserve/COVID-19 list by the Steelers on November 10, 2020, and activated on November 14. He was placed back on the COVID-19 list on December 10, 2020, and activated again on December 23.

=== Retirement ===
Williams was released on March 16, 2021, but re-signed to a one-year contract on April 15. He announced his retirement on July 21.

== NFL career statistics ==
Legend
**Bold**	Career high

=== Regular season ===
Year	Team	Games		Tackles					Interceptions					Fumbles			
Year	Team	GP	GS	Cmb	Solo	Ast	Sck	TFL	Int	Yds	TD	Lng	PD	FF	FR	Yds	TD
2013	PIT	15	11	53	40	13	0.0	4	0	0	0	0	0	0	0	0	0
2014	PIT	**16**	2	43	28	15	0.0	0	0	0	0	0	0	0	1	0	0
2015	PIT	**16**	0	46	34	12	0.5	2	0	0	0	0	1	0	**2**	0	0
2016	PIT	**16**	4	47	37	10	2.0	7	0	0	0	0	0	0	0	0	0
2017	PIT	**16**	**16**	**89**	**69**	20	**8.0**	11	**1**	13	0	13	1	0	0	0	0
2018	PIT	14	14	76	50	26	4.5	8	**1**	**17**	**1**	**17**	**2**	0	0	0	0
2019	PIT	14	8	55	28	**27**	2.5	4	0	0	0	0	1	0	1	0	0
2020	PIT	14	14	70	47	23	3.0	**14**	0	0	0	0	0	0	**2**	0	0
		121	69	479	333	146	20.5	50	2	30	1	17	5	0	6	0	0

=== Playoffs ===
Year	Team	Games		Tackles					Interceptions					Fumbles			
Year	Team	GP	GS	Cmb	Solo	Ast	Sck	TFL	Int	Yds	TD	Lng	PD	FF	FR	Yds	TD
2014	PIT	1	0	2	1	1	0.0	**1**	0	0	0	0	0	0	0	0	0
2015	PIT	2	0	3	3	0	0.0	0	0	0	0	0	0	0	0	0	0
2016	PIT	**3**	0	4	4	0	0.0	0	0	0	0	0	0	0	0	0	0
2017	PIT	1	**1**	**10**	**6**	**4**	0.0	0	0	0	0	0	0	0	0	0	0
2020	PIT	1	**1**	7	5	2	0.0	0	0	0	0	0	0	0	0	0	0
		8	2	26	19	7	0.0	1	0	0	0	0	0	0	0	0	0

== Personal life ==
His brother is running back Karlos Williams who previously played for the Buffalo Bills and the Pittsburgh Steelers. They also played together at Florida State.

He is married to Javania Williams and has four sons.
