= Karlos Williams =

American football player (born 1993)

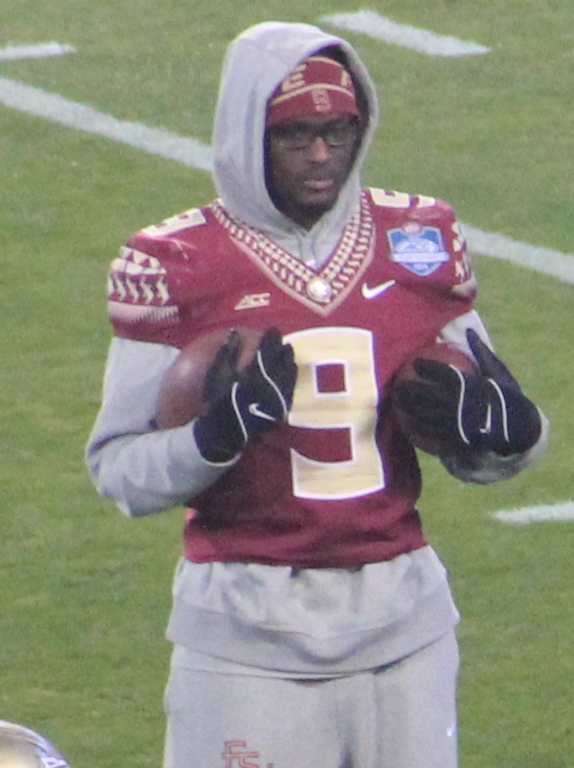
- Williams with the Florida State Seminoles in 2014

No. 29
- Position: Running back

Personal information
- Born: May 4, 1993 (age 33); Davenport, Florida, U.S.
- Listed height: 6 ft 1 in (1.85 m)
- Listed weight: 230 lb (104 kg)

Career information
- High school: Ridge Community (Davenport)
- College: Florida State
- NFL draft: 2015: 5th round, 155th overall pick

Career history
- Buffalo Bills (2015); Pittsburgh Steelers (2016)*; Toronto Argonauts (2020)
- * Offseason or practice squad member only

Awards and highlights
- BCS national champion (2013)

Career NFL statistics
- Rushing attempts: 93
- Rushing yards: 517
- Rushing touchdowns: 7
- Receptions: 11
- Receiving yards: 96
- Receiving touchdowns: 2
- Stats at Pro Football Reference

Karlos Jermell Williams Sr. (born May 4, 1993) is an American former professional football player who was a running back in the National Football League (NFL). He played college football for the Florida State Seminoles and was selected by the Buffalo Bills in the fifth round of the 2015 NFL draft. Despite a promising rookie season with the Bills, Williams was cut the following year due to off-field issues. He was also a member of the Pittsburgh Steelers, as well as the Toronto Argonauts of the Canadian Football League (CFL).

== Early life ==
Williams attended Ridge Community High School in Davenport, Florida, where he was a three-sport star in football, track and basketball. He played safety and running back. He was a five-star recruit by Rivals.com and was ranked as the second best safety and eighth best player overall in his class.

He was also a track star in high school. He won the 200-meter dash event at the 2010 East County Track Meet with a time of 22.49 seconds. He placed 5th in the 100-meter dash at the 2011 FHSAA 3A Championships with a time of 10.7 seconds. He was timed at 10.5 seconds in the 100-meters as a senior.

== College career ==
Williams played safety his first two years at Florida State University. As a true freshman in 2011, he played in 12 games as a backup safety and return specialist. He missed the teams bowl game due to a broken wrist he suffered in the final regular season game. As a sophomore in 2012, he again was a backup and return specialist. He played in 14 games and made one start. Williams entered his junior season in 2013 as a safety, but was moved to running back after the first game. His first career carry was a 65-yard touchdown run against the Nevada Wolf Pack. During the 2014 BCS National Championship Game against Auburn he rushed for 25 yards on five carries, including a seven-yard fake punt conversion on fourth-and-four. He finished the year with 730 rushing yards and 11 rushing touchdowns on 91 carries. In 2014, Williams began his senior season as the starter, but eventually played behind Dalvin Cook. He finished the year with 689 yards on 150 carries with 11 touchdowns.

== Professional career ==
Pre-draft measurables
| Height | Weight | Arm length | Hand span | 40-yard dash | 10-yard split | 20-yard split | 20-yard shuttle | Three-cone drill | Vertical jump | Broad jump | Bench press |
|---|---|---|---|---|---|---|---|---|---|---|---|
| 6 ft 0 3/4 in (1.85 m) | 230 lb (104 kg) | 33 in (0.84 m) | 9 3/4 in (0.25 m) | 4.48 s | 1.60 s | 2.66 s | 4.46 s | 7.16 s | 33.5 in (0.85 m) | 9 ft 9 in (2.97 m) | 16 reps |
All values from NFL Combine

=== Buffalo Bills ===
Williams was drafted by the Buffalo Bills in the fifth round (155th overall) of the 2015 NFL draft. Just as his first carry in college was for a touchdown, Williams's first carry in the NFL was a 26-yard touchdown run for the Bills against the Indianapolis Colts.

In Week 3 against the Miami Dolphins, Williams surpassed 100 yards rushing for the first time in his career. He ran for 110 yards and two touchdowns on just twelve carries, including a 41-yard scoring run.

Williams missed three games after suffering a concussion against the New York Giants in Week 4. He returned in a Week 9 rematch against the Dolphins.

On November 8, 2015, Williams ran for a career-high 2 touchdowns against the Miami Dolphins.

In Buffalo's Week 10 win over the New York Jets, Williams tied a record held by former New England Patriots running back Robert Edwards by reaching the end zone in his sixth consecutive game to start his career.

On August 20, 2016, Williams was released by the Bills after reportedly showing up to training camp out of shape and was later suspended four games for violating the NFL's substance abuse policy.

=== Pittsburgh Steelers ===
On October 11, 2016, Williams was signed to the practice squad of the Pittsburgh Steelers. On November 23, Williams was suspended 10 games for violating the NFL's substance abuse policy. He signed a reserve/future contract with the Steelers on January 24, 2017 after his suspension was lifted. He was released by the Steelers on March 9.

On June 28, 2017, Williams was suspended for at least one year for violating the NFL Policy and Program for Substances of Abuse for a third time. He was reinstated from suspension on February 21, 2019.

=== Toronto Argonauts ===
Williams signed a futures contract with the Toronto Argonauts of the Canadian Football League on November 15, 2019. He signed a contract extension with the team on December 14, 2020.

On April 27, 2021, Williams announced his retirement from professional football.

== Personal life ==
His brother, Vince Williams played college football at Florida State and played as a linebacker for the Pittsburgh Steelers.

He is a cousin of Derwin James.

Williams has seven children: two daughters, Kylie and Kota, and five sons, Karlos Jr., Kobi, Kason, Korri, and Karter. His son, Kason, was diagnosed with Hirschsprung's disease in early 2017.
