= Haines City High School =

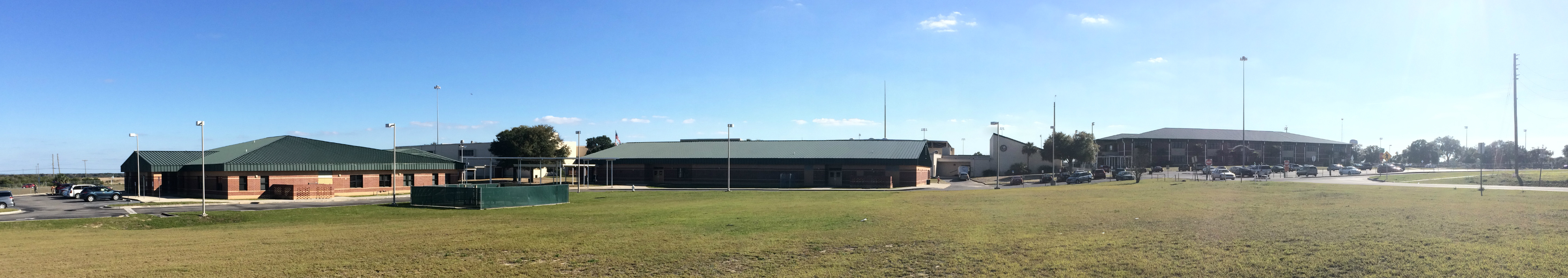

Location
- 2800 Hornet Drive; Haines City, FL 33844; United States; 28°5′57.05″N 81°36′29.65″W

Information
- Type: Public
- Established: 1922
- School board: Polk County Public Schools
- CEEB code: 100620
- Principal: Eric Hutchinson
- Teaching staff: 122.00 (FTE)
- Enrollment: 3,105 (2024-2025)
- Student to teacher ratio: 25.45
- Hours in school day: 7 Hours
- Colors: Kelly Green, White, and Black
- Athletics: Girls Weightlifting, Boys Weightlifting, Wrestling, Golf, Swimming, Cross Country, Tennis, Track & Field, Boys Soccer, Girls Soccer, Football. Baseball, Softball, Girls Volleyball, Boys Basketball, Girls Basketball
- Athletics conference: FHSAA: Class 2A, District 10 (Girls Weightlifting); Class 2A, District 12 (Boys Weightlifting); Class 3A, District 5 (Wrestling); Class 3A, District 9 (Golf); Class 4A, District 4 (Swimming); Class 4A, District 5 (Cross Country, Tennis, Track & Field); Class 5A, District 9 (Boys Soccer, Girls Soccer); Class 8A, District 7 (Football); Class 9A, District 5 (Baseball, Softball); Class 9A, District 7 (Girls Volleyball, Boys Basketball, Girls Basketball)
- Mascot: Hornet
- Rivals: Ridge Community High School, Lake Wales High School, Poinciana High school, Liberty High school
- Information: PHONE: (863) 421-3281 or (863) 421-3282; FAX: (863) 422-3283
- Website: https://hainescityhigh.polkschoolsfl.com/
- Last updated: 00:14, 1 May 2016 (UTC)

Haines City Senior High School (HCHS) is a public high school in Haines City, Florida. Haines City Senior High School is administered by Polk County Public Schools. It was the original high school in the city, opening in 1922. The school has existed in three separate locations.

The logo of Haines City High School. Mainly seen in athletics.

== History ==
The first settlers arrived in Haines City in 1881; two years later, they built the town's first school on East Hinson Avenue. The two-story wooden structure had a school enrollment of nine students. In 1918, a yellow brick elementary school for grades one through eight was built. Any student desiring a high school education had to attend classes in Lakeland, located 25 miles away.

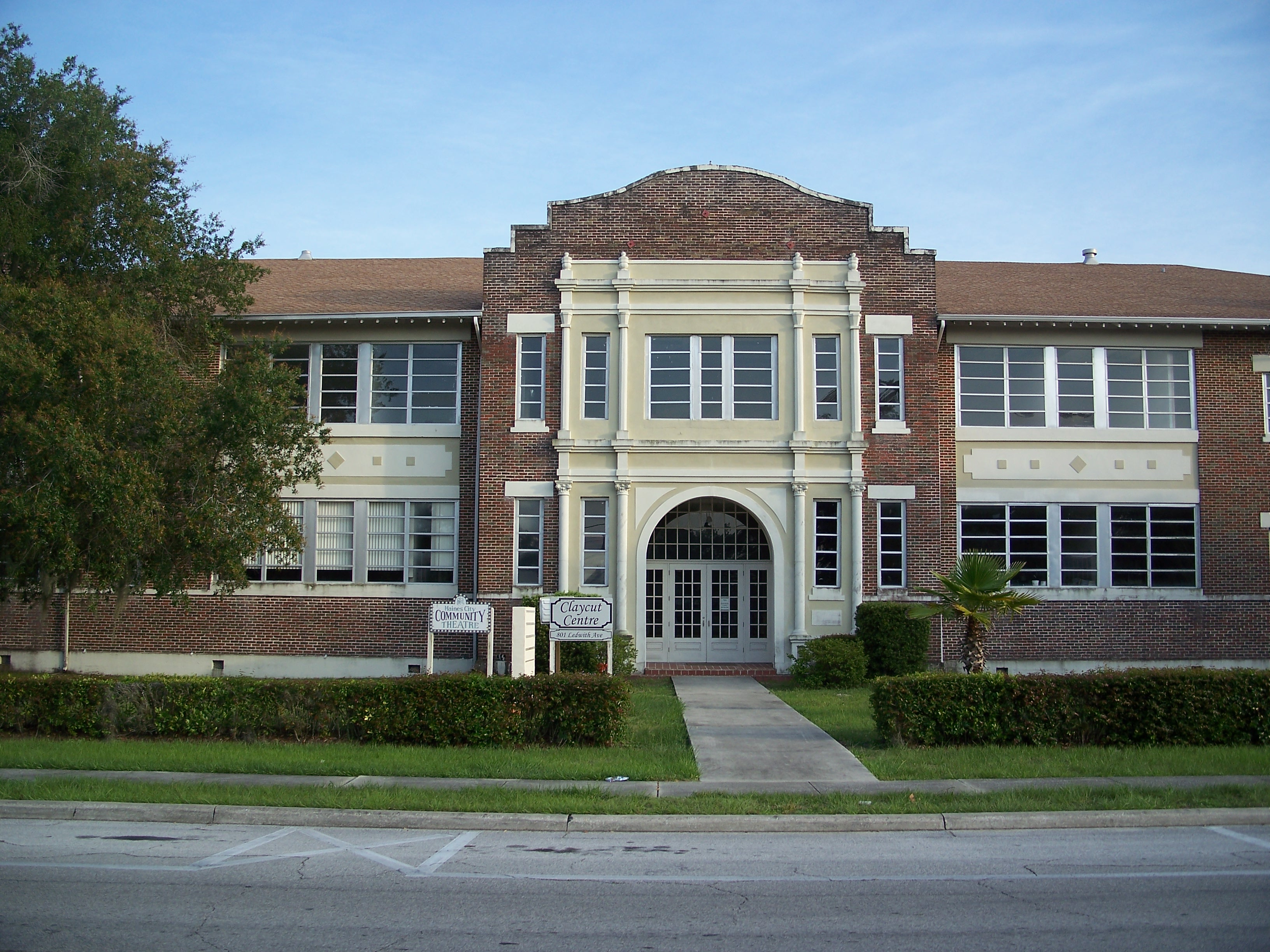
Original high school, now a theater called Clay Cut Centre, adjacent to the middle school Daniel Jenkins Academy of Technology.

The first school serving grades one through twelve was built in 1922 on Ledwith Avenue, and a new elementary school, Central Elementary, was built in 1925. A new high school was built next to Central Elementary in 1949, which received national recognition in an architectural periodical for its innovative design. When it opened, it housed grade seven through twelve, but was later changed to grades ten through twelve, and three additions were eventually added to the school.

After increasing enrollment demands and a rising local population, the school moved to its current location in 1977. The school has since added a gymnasium, a new agricultural and industrial arts complex, a new science building in 1990 and a new social studies wing in 1991. In addition, the old football facility at Yale Field (owned by the city of Haines City) was renamed in honor of former longtime coach Joseph Stangry and relocated to the new campus. In 1992, the City Commission of Haines City approved a request by the student council to rename the section of Grace Avenue adjacent to the school Hornet Drive, named for the school's mascot.

=== International Baccalaureate East ===
In the 2008 school year, an International Baccalaureate Diploma Program was approved. To enter the program, students are required to take a qualification test in eighth grade. Around 150 ninth grade students are accepted every year into the program. The IB program does not technically begin until the students' junior year; the school offers a Pre-IB program for freshman and sophomore students to prepare them for the rigors of the latter two years. Haines City IB also goes by International Baccalaureate East, distinguishing itself from its intracounty IB rival at Bartow High School.

=== Fire ===
On May 17, 2013, Haines City High School experienced a small fire in the freshman academy building.

== School songs ==
The school's fight song is an arrangement of "Our Director March" by Frederick Bigelow with school-specific lyrics.

== Notable alumni ==
- Arthur Blake - Olympian hurdler
- Wayne Gandy - former NFL player
- Derrick Gibson - Former MLB player (Colorado Rockies)
- Marshall Holloway - physicist
- Derwin James - NFL player
- Larry Parrish - Former MLB player (Montreal Expos, Texas Rangers, Boston Red Sox)
- Jah Reid - former NFL player
- Sevyn Streeter - R&B Singer
