= White Men Can't Jump (2023 film) =

Film directed by Calmatic

- Promotional release poster
- Directed by: Calmatic
- Screenplay by: Kenya Barris; Doug Hall
- Story by: Ron Shelton; Kenya Barris; Doug Hall
- Based on: White Men Can't Jump by Ron Shelton
- Produced by: Kenya Barris; Paul Hall
- Starring: Sinqua Walls; Jack Harlow; Teyana Taylor; Laura Harrier; Vince Staples; Myles Bullock; Lance Reddick
- Cinematography: Tommy Maddox-Upshaw
- Edited by: Jonathan Schwartz
- Music by: Marcelo Zarvos
- Production companies: 20th Century Studios; Khalabo Ink Society
- Distributed by: Hulu
- Release date: May 19, 2023
- Running time: 101 minutes
- Country: United States
- Language: English

White Men Can't Jump is a 2023 American sports comedy film directed by Calmatic, and written by Kenya Barris and Doug Hall from a story they co-wrote with Ron Shelton. It is a remake of the 1992 film. It stars Sinqua Walls and Jack Harlow, in his acting debut, in the lead roles, alongside Teyana Taylor, Laura Harrier, Vince Staples, Myles Bullock, and Lance Reddick.

The film was released by Hulu on May 19, 2023, and received mixed reviews, with critics comparing it unfavorably to its original counterpart.

== Plot ==
In this modern remix of the iconic film, seemingly opposite street hoopers, Jeremy, an injury prone former star, and Kamal, a has-been prodigy, team up to take one final shot at living out their dreams.

— Hulu

== Cast ==
- Sinqua Walls as Kamal
- Jack Harlow as Jeremy
- Lance Reddick as Benji
- Teyana Taylor as Imani
- Laura Harrier as Tatiana
- Myles Bullock as Renzo
- Vince Staples as Speedy
- Zak Steiner as Phillip Williamson
- J. Alphonse Nicholson as Jermaine
- Aiden Shute as Drew
- Bentley Green as Jacoby
- Andrew Schulz as TJ
- James Earl as Mooch

Additionally, Stan Verrett, Blake Griffin, Taylor Rooks, Duke Skywalka and Tyler Herro play themselves.

== Production ==
In January 2017, Kenya Barris was reported to be developing a White Men Can't Jump remake produced by NBA star Blake Griffin and NFL player Ryan Kalil. In November 2021, Calmatic was revealed to be the director. In March 2022, rapper and actor Jack Harlow was cast in the film, in the role originally played by Woody Harrelson. In April 2022, Sinqua Walls was cast as Kamal Allen, the equivalent of Wesley Snipes' character in the original 1992 film. Other characters include Jermaine, who often antagonizes Kamal; Bobby, Kamal's boss; and an opposing fan who trash-talks Kamal. Barris produced the film under his Khalabo Ink Society banner alongside Hall, and Kalil, Griffin, and Noah Weinstein executive produce under their Mortal Media banner. On May 5, 2022, Lance Reddick, Teyana Taylor, and Laura Harrier were cast in the film. Additional castings included Tamera "Tee" Kissen, Myles Bullock, Vince Staples, and Zak Steiner.

Filming began on May 11, 2022, in Los Angeles, with Tommy Maddox-Upshaw as the cinematographer. It wrapped up by July 2022. The film was scored by Marcelo Zarvos and will feature a soundtrack by DJ Drama. By January 11, 2023, the film was in post-production.

== Release ==
White Men Can't Jump was released on May 19, 2023, on Hulu. Internationally, the film was released on Disney+.

== Reception ==
=== Viewership ===
Analytics company Samba TV, which gathers viewership data from certain smart TVs and content providers, reported that White Men Can't Jump was the seventh most-streamed program from May 17–23, 2023. Whip Media, which tracks viewership data for the more than 25 million worldwide users of its TV Time app, calculated that White Men Can't Jump was the fifth most-streamed film in the U.S. during the week of May 21, 2023. It later moved to ninth place during the week of May 28, 2023.

=== Critical response ===
On the review aggregator website Rotten Tomatoes, 26% of 88 critics' reviews are positive, with an average rating of 4.5/10. The website's consensus reads: "Never mind being able to get air - the White Men Can't Jump remake struggles to come up with reasons for its own existence." Metacritic, which uses a weighted average, assigned the film a score of 40 out of 100, based on 23 critics, indicating "mixed or average" reviews.

Wendy Ide of The Observer gave White Men Can't Jump three out of five stars, saying that the film is a slick and unchallenging remake that is enjoyable but raises the question of the need for a remake of the 1992 original. She mentioned that Sinqua Walls and Jack Harlow performed adequately in the roles originally played by Wesley Snipes and Woody Harrelson. Ide noted that Calmatic brought a flashy energy to the film but felt the story lacked depth. She found the film to be a safer and more generic sports movie, with the original's rough edges smoothed out.

Robert Daniels of RogerEbert.com gave White Men Can't Jump one out of four stars, stating the movie is undermined by what he described as the director's "noxious audacity," which transforms a classic into a "rote joke." He questioned the necessity of the remake, finding the film unimaginative, corny, and unfulfilling. Daniels compared it unfavorably to the original, noting that the sharp critique of stereotypes in the 1992 film was lost in this version, which he found to be more focused on rehashing outdated elements. He criticized Jack Harlow's performance, calling it monotone and lacking conviction. Daniels also felt that the screenplay failed to capture the essence of the original, with poorly executed attempts to address socio-political themes. He noted that the film attempted to explore themes like Black masculinity and self-care but failed to develop its characters properly.

=== Accolades ===
Lance Reddick received a nomination for Outstanding Supporting Performance in a TV Movie or Limited Series at the 2023 Black Reel Awards for Television. White Men Can't Jump was nominated for Location Manager of the Year - Studio Feature Film and Location Team of the Year - Studio Feature Film at the 2022 California on Location Awards.

== See also ==
- List of basketball films
