= Ridge Community High School =

Location
- 500 Orchid Drive; Davenport, Florida; United States; 28.1513°N 81.6286°W

Information
- Type: Public
- Motto: "Once a Bolt, Always a Bolt"
- Established: 2005
- School district: Polk County Public Schools
- Principal: Matthew Blankenship
- Staff: 121.00 (FTE)
- Grades: 9 to 12
- Enrollment: 2,666 (2023-2024)
- Student to teacher ratio: 22.03
- Colors: Navy blue and Silver
- Mascot: Bolt
- Website: ridgecommunityhigh.polkschoolsfl.com

Ridge Community High School or RCHS is a public high school located on the Davenport, Florida and Haines City, Florida Line. RCHS was established in 2005 in Polk County. Ridge Community High School is one of many schools with a separate 9th Grade campus with its own front office. The main campus holds students in 10th, 11th, and 12th grade with some exceptions. Ridge Community High School sits on 76 acres (310,000 m^{2}) of land. Ridge Community High School is zoned for Davenport and Haines City. Ridge Community High School's rivals include Haines City High School, Lake Wales High School and others in Polk County. The principal of RCHS is Matthew Blankenship. Ridge Community High School is part of the Polk County School Board. RCHS's mascot is the Bolt, and the school motto is Once a Bolt, always a Bolt.

RCHS serves grades 9 - 12. RCHS is also referred to as Ridge by fellow students and alumni.

== Departments ==
The following departments are offered at Ridge Community High school:

- Agriculture Department
- Exceptional Student Education Department
- Family and Consumer Science Department
- Music Department
- Visual and Digital Art Department
- JROTC Department
- English Language Arts Department
- Math Department
- Physical Education Department
- Science Department
- Social Studies Department
- World Language Department
- Theatre and Dance Department

== Athletics ==
The Following sports teams are available for students at Ridge Community High School:

=== Fall sports ===
- Girls' Volleyball
- Cross Country
- Swimming
- Girls' Golf
- Boys' Golf
- Cheerleading
- Football

=== Winter Sports ===
- Wrestling
- Boys' Basketball
- Girls' Basketball
- Girls' Soccer
- Boys' Soccer
- Girls' Weightlifting
- Color Guard

=== Spring Sports ===
- Boys' Weightlifting
- Track
- Girls' Tennis
- Boys' Tennis
- Baseball
- Softball

== Notable alumni ==
- Joe Jackson, college football running back for the Kansas State Wildcats
- Mike James, running back for the Tampa Bay Buccaneers
- Dazeran Jones, center for Jacksonville Giants
- Karlos Williams, running back for the Pittsburgh Steelers, former running back for the Buffalo Bills
- Vince Williams, linebacker for the Pittsburgh Steelers

== Overview ==
Ridge Community High School was ranked as a D school from 2005 to 2010, the school has been recognized for their high standardized Advanced Placement and honors classes. RCHS is now listed as a B Rank school as of late 2012. Students at RCHS can participate in Dual enrollment, chiefly Polk State College. Polk State College is also part of Ridge Community High School, and provides evening classes bearing college credit to students of RCHS for no cost. As of 2015, a new Dual enrollment program with Southeastern University will be introduced starting for the 2015–2016 school year.
