= Joe Jackson (running back) =

American football player (born 2004)

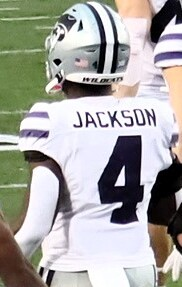
- Jackson in 2024

No. 4 – Kansas State Wildcats
- Position: Running back
- Class: Redshirt Sophomore

Personal information
- Born: October 4, 2004 (age 22); Winter Haven, Florida, U.S.
- Listed height: 6 ft 0 in (1.83 m)
- Listed weight: 212 lb (96 kg)

Career information
- High school: Ridge Community (Davenport, Florida)
- College: Kansas State (2023–present)

Awards and highlights
- Third-team All-Big 12 (2025)
- Stats at ESPN

Joe Jackson (born October 4, 2004) is an American college football running back for the Kansas State Wildcats.

== Early life ==
Jackson attended Ridge Community High School located in Davenport, Florida. Coming out of high school, he committed to play college football for the Kansas State Wildcats over offers from other schools such as Duke, Rutgers, Iowa State, Pittsburgh, Purdue, Utah, Vanderbilt, and Wake Forest.

== College career ==
During his first collegiate season in 2023, he played in two games, notching four carries. In the 2024 Rate Bowl, Jackson ran for 50 yards, while also recording three receptions for 37 yards and a touchdown versus Rutgers. He finished the 2024 season, rushing for 227 yards and a touchdown on 39 carries. In week six of the 2025 season, Jackson ran for 61 yards on 13 carries, while also notching five receptions for 41 yards in a loss to Baylor. In week seven, he rushed for 110 yards on 27 carries in a victory over TCU. In week 13, Jackson set the Kansas State single-game rushing yards record, after rushing for 293 yards and three touchdowns in a 51-47 loss to Utah.

=== College statistics ===
Year	Team	GP	Rushing			
Year	Team	GP	Att	Yds	Avg	TD
2023	Kansas State	2	4	1	0.3	1
2024	Kansas State	10	39	227	5.8	1
2025	Kansas State	12	169	911	5.4	8
Career		24	212	1,139	5.4	9
