= Jah Reid =

American football player (born 1988)

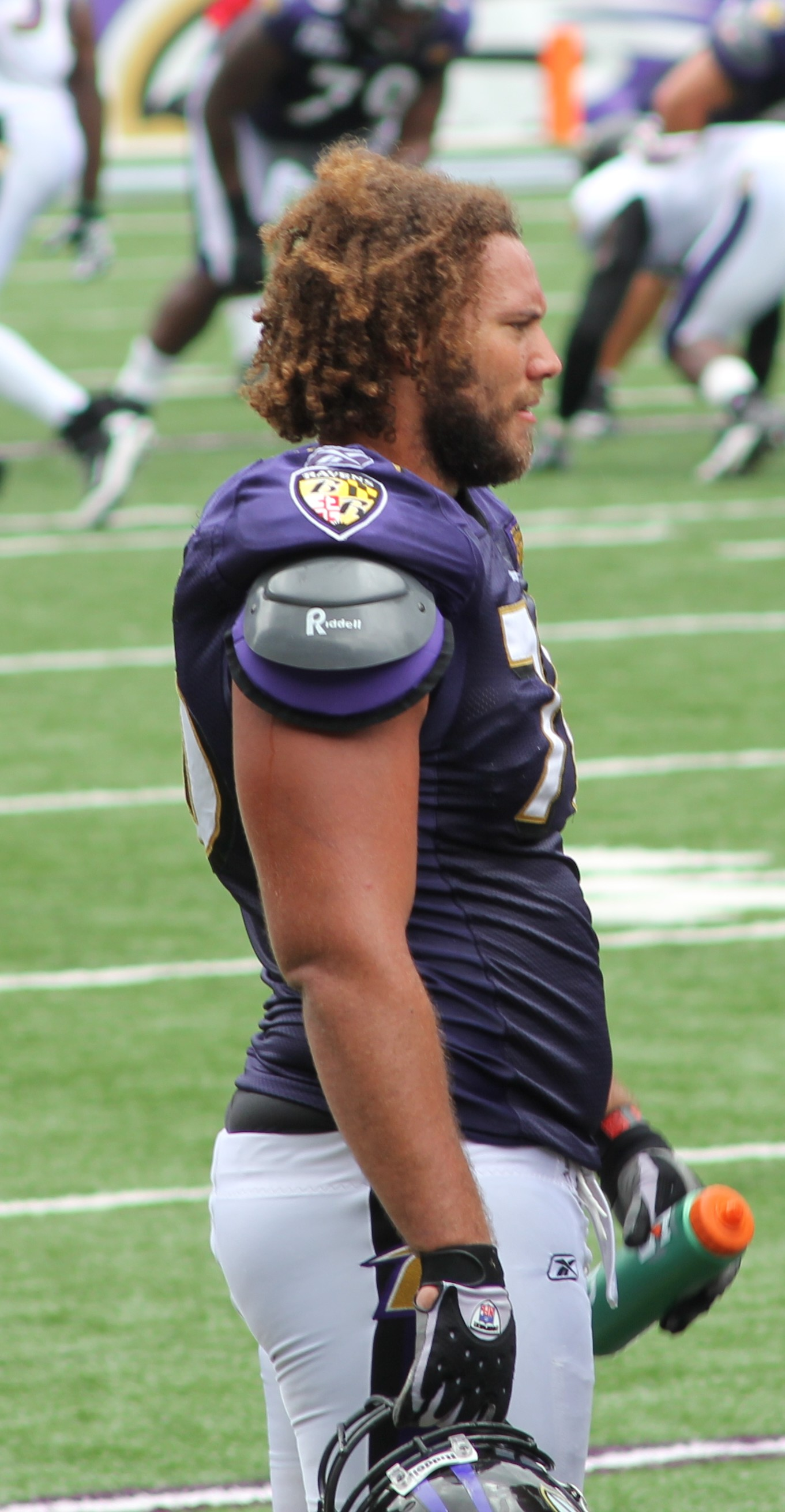
- Reid during practice at M&T Bank Stadium in 2011

No. 75, 76
- Position: Offensive tackle

Personal information
- Born: July 21, 1988 (age 38); Kissimmee, Florida, U.S.
- Listed height: 6 ft 7 in (2.01 m)
- Listed weight: 325 lb (147 kg)

Career information
- High school: Haines City (Haines City, Florida)
- College: UCF
- NFL draft: 2011: 3rd round, 85th overall pick

Career history
- Baltimore Ravens (2011–2014); Kansas City Chiefs (2015–2016); Houston Texans (2017)

Awards and highlights
- Super Bowl champion (XLVII); 2× First-team All-C-USA (2009, 2010)

Career NFL statistics
- Games played: 61
- Games started: 18
- Stats at Pro Football Reference

Jah Reid (born July 21, 1988) is an American former professional football player who was an offensive tackle in the National Football League (NFL). He was selected by the Baltimore Ravens in the third round of the 2011 NFL draft. He played college football for the UCF Knights.

== Early life ==
Reid attended Haines City High School, where he played high school football for the Hornets.

== Professional career ==
Pre-draft measurables
Height	Weight	Arm length	Hand span	Wingspan	40-yard dash	10-yard split	20-yard split	20-yard shuttle	Three-cone drill	Vertical jump	Broad jump	Bench press
6 ft 7 1/8 in (2.01 m)	327 lb (148 kg)	34 3/8 in (0.87 m)	10 1/4 in (0.26 m)	6 ft 10 3/4 in (2.10 m)	5.29 s	1.78 s	3.07 s	4.59 s	7.63 s	29.5 in (0.75 m)	9 ft 3 in (2.82 m)	28 reps
All values from NFL Combine/Pro Day

=== Baltimore Ravens ===
Reid was selected by the Baltimore Ravens in the third round of the 2011 NFL draft. On September 5, 2015, he was released by the Ravens.

=== Kansas City Chiefs ===
On September 7, 2015, Reid was signed by the Kansas City Chiefs.

On August 31, 2017, Reid was released by the Chiefs.

=== Houston Texans ===
On September 18, 2017, Reid was signed by the Houston Texans. He was released on October 10, 2017.

== Legal issues ==
Reid was arrested March 9, 2014, and charged with two misdemeanor counts of battery while at a South Florida stripclub. According to the arrest affidavit, security footage viewed by the arresting officer shows Reid being accidentally bumped into by Edmond Mussa, which triggered an argument. Reid then allegedly charged Mussa, head-butted and punched him causing Mussa to fall to the ground, Reid allegedly began kicking him once he was on the ground. When security guard David Smith intervened, police said Reid punched Smith in the face.
