= Qua Moss =

American football player

No. 6 – Tennessee Volunteers
- Position: Safety
- Class: Junior

Personal information
- Listed height: 5 ft 10 in (1.78 m)
- Listed weight: 190 lb (86 kg)

Career information
- High school: Troup County (LaGrange, Georgia)
- College: Dodge City (2023); West Georgia (2024); Kansas State (2025); Tennessee (2026–present)
- Stats at ESPN

Mar'Quavious Moss is an American college football safety for the Tennessee Volunteers. He previously played for the Dodge City Conquistadors, West Georgia Wolves and Kansas State Wildcats.

== Early life ==
Moss attended Troup County High School in LaGrange, Georgia, where he was a defensive back and wide receiver. As a senior, he had 24 tackles, one interception and one sack.

== College career ==
Moss attended Dodge City Community College his freshman year in 2023 and transferred to the University of West Georgia. In his lone season with West Georgia in 2024, he started all 11 games and had 56 tackles and five sacks. After the season, he entered the transfer portal and committed to Kansas State University. Moss started 10 of 12 games in 2025, recording 41 tackles, two interceptions and one sack. He entered the transfer portal again after the season and committed to the University of Tennessee. He was a starter for Tennessee in 2026.
