= Orlando Waves =

- League: American Basketball Association (2016–present); Florida League (2016-present)
- Founded: 2016
- History: Orlando Waves (2016–present)
- Arena: Kissimmee Civic Center (2016-2017); Orlando Downtown Recreation Complex (2017-present)
- Location: Orlando, Florida
- Team colors: Midnight Blue, Gold, Sky Blue
- General manager: J.J. Stuckey
- Head coach: TBD
- Ownership: Anthony Stuckey
- Championships: 0
- Website: www.orlandowaves.com

The Orlando Waves were a basketball team based in Orlando, Florida playing in the American Basketball Association.

== History ==
In June 2016, the ABA announced that Central Florida were getting an ABA Team revealing the name to be, Orlando Waves. Douglas Leichner was announced as the Waves Head Coach. The Waves debut in the ABA's Florida League on November 5, 2016 for the 2016-17 Season. They played their games at the Kissimmee Civic Center.

=== 2016-17 ===
The Orlando Waves debuted on November 5, 2016 against the St. Petersburg Tide at the Kissimmee Civic Center winning with a 131-114 score. Waves started the year winning the first 9 out of 10 games of the inaugural season. They finished the season on a 7-Game winning streak. Waves finished the 2016-17 Season in the 3rd Seed in the Florida League, and 4th Seed in the 4th Seed in the ABA, with a 16-2 record.

=== 2017-18 ===
Starting the 2017-18 Season, the Orlando Waves will start playing their Home Games at the Orlando Downtown Recreation Complex.

== Arena ==
The Orlando Waves played their inaugural season at the Kissimmee Civic Center in Kissimmee, FL. On February 10, 2017 the Waves announced that they would be playing their home games at the Orlando Downtown Recreation Complex starting the 2017-18 season.
