= Mike James (American football) =

American football player (born 1991)

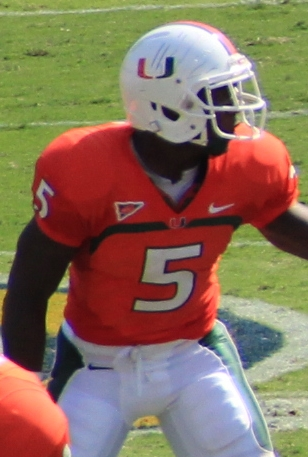
- James with the Miami Hurricanes in 2012

No. 25
- Position: Running back

Personal information
- Born: April 13, 1991 (age 35); Haines City, Florida, U.S.
- Listed height: 5 ft 10 in (1.78 m)
- Listed weight: 223 lb (101 kg)

Career information
- High school: Ridge Community (Davenport, Florida)
- College: Miami (FL)
- NFL draft: 2013: 6th round, 189th overall pick

Career history
- Tampa Bay Buccaneers (2013–2016); Detroit Lions (2016)*; Tampa Bay Buccaneers (2016); Detroit Lions (2016–2017)
- * Offseason or practice squad member only

Career NFL statistics
- Rushing yards: 351
- Rushing average: 4.2
- Receptions: 15
- Receiving yards: 60
- Stats at Pro Football Reference

Mike James (born April 13, 1991) is an American former professional football player who was a running back for the Tampa Bay Buccaneers and Detroit Lions of the National Football League (NFL). He played college football for the Miami Hurricanes. James was selected in the sixth round of the 2013 NFL draft by the Buccaneers.

== Early life ==
James attended Ridge Community High School in Davenport, Florida, where he played for the Bolts football team. He was selected to The Ledger's all-county first-team as a running back and to the Mobile Press-Register's Super Southeast 120. He was also a Florida Sports Writers Association All-State honorable mention. Coming out of high school he was ranked as the 18th-best running back prospect by Scout.com, the 21st-best by Rivals.com, and the 33rd-best by ESPN.com.

== College career ==
James attended the University of Miami, where he played four seasons for the Hurricanes football team. During his collegiate career he rushed for 1,386 yards on 312 carries with 17 rushing touchdowns, while recording 585 receiving yards and five receiving touchdowns. During the 2010 and 2011 seasons, he played mainly as a backup for Damien Berry and Lamar Miller. During the 2012 season, he and Duke Johnson shared playing time. As a senior he was honored with the Community Service Man of the Year Award, Captain's Award, Melching Leadership Award, and was named Jack Harding Team Most Valuable Player.

== Professional career ==
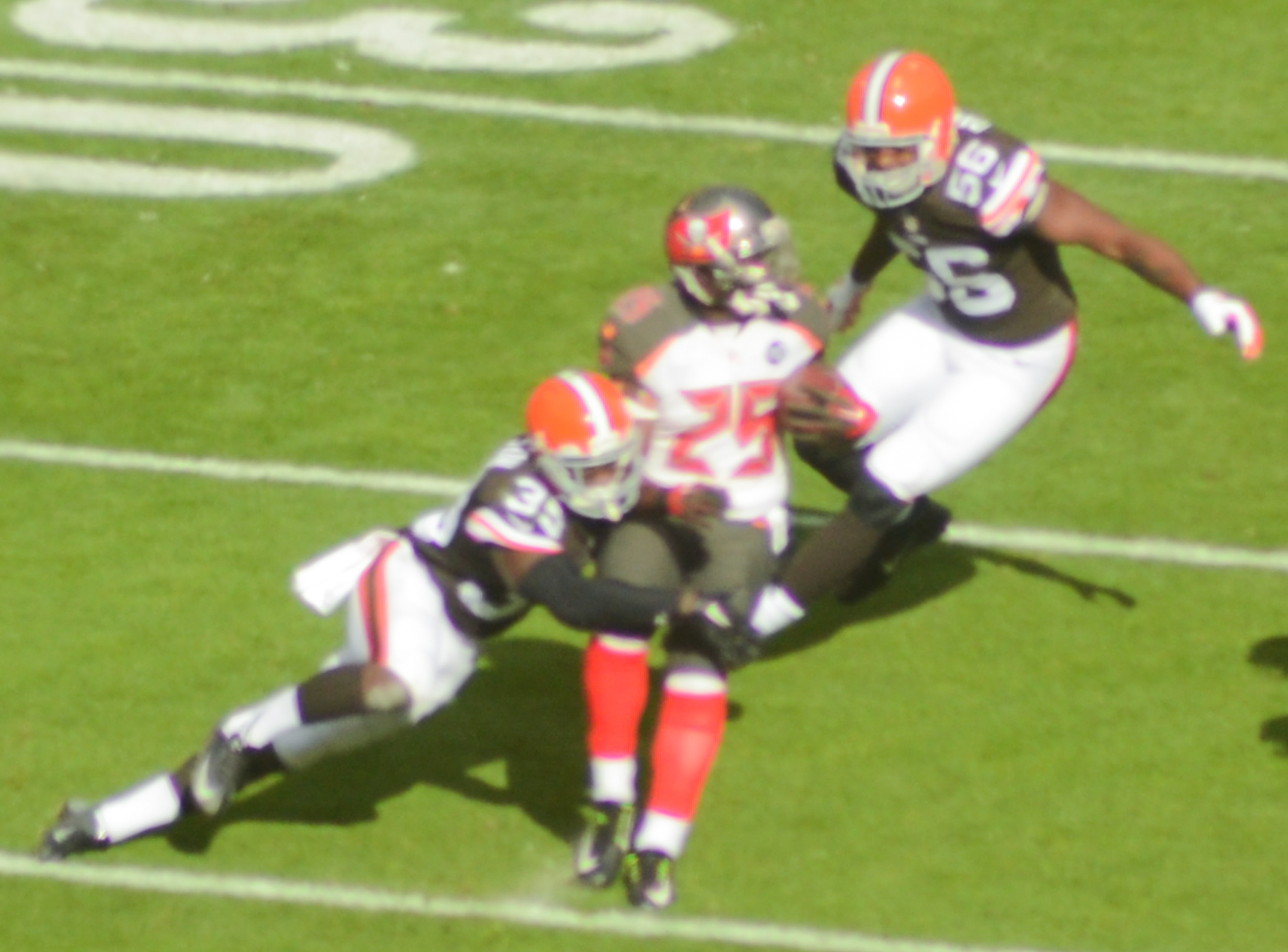
James (#25) with the Buccaneers in 2014

=== Tampa Bay Buccaneers (first stint) ===
James was selected by the Tampa Bay Buccaneers in the sixth round (189th overall) of the 2013 NFL draft. On May 13, 2013, he signed a four-year deal worth $2,263,152 which also included a $103,152 signing bonus. During his rookie season he rushed for 295 yards on 60 carries, including a 158-yard game against Seattle during week 9. His season ended the following week against Miami when he broke his ankle on a goal-line run.

During the 2014 season James rushed for 37 yards in 11 games played. The next year he was released by the Buccaneers on September 29, then signed to the practice squad on October 1, and promoted to the active roster on December 26, 2015. He did not play in any games during the 2015 season. James was waived by the Buccaneers on September 7, 2016, following an injury.

=== Detroit Lions (first stint) ===
On October 3, 2016, the Detroit Lions signed James to their practice squad. He was released on October 25, 2016.

=== Tampa Buccaneers (second stint) ===
On November 1, 2016, James was re-signed by the Buccaneers. He played in four games before being waived on November 29.

=== Detroit Lions (second stint) ===
On December 3, 2016, James was re-signed to the Lions practice squad. He signed a reserve / future contract with the Lions on January 9, 2017. On August 15, 2017, the Lions placed James on injured reserve with a concussion.

== Cannabis use and advocacy ==
James is an advocate for the medical use of cannabis, which he says can help reduce addiction to opioids among NFL players. James says cannabis helped him overcome his own painkiller addiction while recovering from a severe ankle injury sustained in 2013. In 2018, after failing a drug test the previous year, James filed a therapeutic use exemption (TUE) with the NFL to allow him to use cannabis. The petition was later denied, but James' attorney said that discussion with league officials was ongoing.

James was featured in the CNN documentary Weed 4 discussing his use of cannabis as an alternate pain reliever and his push for the NFL to allow its use. James is also a co-chair of the Doctors for Cannabis Regulation NFL steering committee.
