= 2014–15 ABA season =

- League: American Basketball Association
- Sport: Basketball
- TV partner(s): ESPN3

Regular season

2015 ABA Playoffs

2015 ABA Championship
- Champions: Shreveport-Bossier Mavericks
- Runners-up: Miami Midnites

ABA seasons
- ← 2013-14 2015–16 →

The 2014–15 ABA season was the 14th season of the American Basketball Association. The season began in November 2014 and ended in March 2015. The playoffs happened in March 2015, with the finals in April 2015.

== Season standings ==
Gulf Coast	W	L	Win %
Shreveport-Bossier Mavericks	28	0	1.000
Bowling Green Bandits	17	3	0.850
Memphis Lions	7	8	0.467
Mobile Bay Tornados	6	3	0.667
Montgomery Blackhawks	6	3	0.667
Birmingham Blitz	5	3	0.625
Jackson Showboats	3	6	0.333
Mid-Atlantic	W	L	Win %
Baltimore Hawks	13	4	0.765
Richmond Elite	9	4	0.692
North Caroline Coyotes	8	4	0.667
Fayetteville Flight	3	8	0.273
Charleston City Lions	2	3	0.400
North Central	W	L	Win %
Chicago Steam	10	1	0.909
West Michigan Lake Hawks	11	4	0.733
Coast II Coast All-Stars	7	3	0.700
Indy Naptown All-Stars	9	6	0.600
Motor City Firebirds	8	5	0.615
Team NetWork	9	5	0.643
Chicago Fury	6	7	0.462
Milwaukee RimRattlers	3	3	0.500
Libertyville Vipers	5	8	0.385
Southern Illinois Monarchs	0	9	0.000
Oakland County Cowboys	0	14	0.000
Detroit Hoops	0	1	0.000
Northeast	W	L	Win %
Providence Sky Chiefs	12	7	0.632
Steel City Yellow Jackets	10	4	0.714
Jersey Express	8	7	0.533
Philadelphia Spirit	6	5	0.545
Staten Island Vipers	4	8	0.333
Bronx Holy Flames	2	6	0.250
Brooklyn SkyRockets	1	11	0.083
Northern California	W	L	Win %
San Francisco Rumble	7	2	0.778
Central Valley Titans	6	3	0.667
Bay Area Matrix	2	4	0.333
Pacific Northwest	W	L	Win %
Calgary Crush	6	4	0.600
Seattle Mountaineers	3	0	1.000
Lakewood Panthers	3	1	0.750
Vancouver Balloholics	2	6	0.250
Kitsap Admirals	2	8	0.200
Southern California	W	L	Win %
Arizona Scorpions	15	2	0.882
Orange County Novastars	8	7	0.533
San Diego Surf	5	8	0.385
Inland Empire Invaders	3	3	0.500
Oceanside A-Team	3	4	0.429
Las Vegas Flames	0	3	0.000
Los Angeles Slam	0	2	0.000
Southeast	W	L	Win %
Jacksonville Giants	25	4	0.862
Miami Midnites	17	3	0.850
South Florida Gold	15	9	0.625
Atlanta Wildcats	10	3	0.769
Georgia Gwizzlies	2	7	0.222
Southcoast Fire	1	10	0.091
Southwest Warriors	1	11	0.083
Southwest	W	L	Win %
Sugarland Legends	11	1	0.917
Am-Mex Swarm	7	1	0.875
Texas Fuel	5	4	0.556
West Texas Whirlwinds	2	2	0.500
Austin Boom	2	5	0.286
Baytown Bandits	2	6	0.250
Louisiana Soul	1	3	0.250
Texarkana Panthers	0	4	0.000
At Large	W	L	Win %
Missouri Rhythm	2	2	0.000
Colorado Kings	1	2	0.333
Travel	W	L	Win %
Metroplex Lightning	6	5	0.545
Shizuoka Gymrats	2	9	0.182
DMV Kings	3	2	0.600
Listed-Never Played	W	L	Win %
Atlanta Aliens			0.000
California Heatwave			0.000
Chicago Court Kingz			0.000
Chicago Stars			0.000
Colorado Cougars			0.000
Columbus Life Bearcats			0.000
Conway Cyclones			0.000
Dallas Impact			0.000
Fort Smith Firebirds			0.000
Fresno Griffins			0.000
Gainesville Heat			0.000
Gem City Hall O' Famers			0.000
Georgia Roadrunners			0.000
Greenville Galaxy			0.000
Gulf Coast Flash			0.000
Hampton Roads Stallions			0.000
Hattiesburg Hornets			0.000
Houston Red Storm			0.000
Illinois Balldogz			0.000
Indiana State Warriors			0.000
Las Vegas Defenders			0.000
Miami Storm			0.000
Minnesota Rattlers			0.000
Monroe Magicians			0.000
New Orleans Cougars			0.000
North Dallas Vandals			0.000
Permian Basin Obvious Culture			0.000
Salem Storm			0.000
Seven City Knights			0.000
South Houston Assault			0.000
South Texas Stingrays			0.000
Syracuse Shockwave			0.000
Tacoma Rise			0.000
Texas Cagers			0.000
Washington Rampage			0.000
West Virginia Blazers			0.000
William Tucker University Freedom Eagles			0.000
Wind River Bison			0.000
