= 2015–16 ABA season =

- League: American Basketball Association
- Sport: Basketball
- TV partner(s): ESPN3

Regular season

2016 ABA Playoffs

2016 ABA Championship
- Champions: Jacksonville Giants
- Runners-up: Windy City Groove

ABA seasons
- ← 2014–15 2016–17 →

The 2015–16 ABA season was the 15th season of the American Basketball Association. The season began in November 2015 and ended in March 2016. The playoffs were played in March 2016, with the finals in April 2016.

== Season standings ==
Northeast 1	W	L	Win %
Jersey Express	14	4	0.778
DMV Warriors	12	3	0.800
Baltimore Hawks	9	8	0.529
York Buccaneers	2	9	0.182
Brooklyn Skyrockets	2	3	0.400
Northeast 2	W	L	Win %
Bronx Holy Flames	5	2	0.714
New York Court Kings	3	9	0.250
Buffalo Blue Hawks	0	2	0.000
Arizona/California	W	L	Win %
Arizona Scorpions	7	3	0.700
Orange County Novastars	7	1	0.875
Tucson Buckets		3	0.000
Las Vegas Jokers	0	3	0.000
Central Valley Titans	0	1	0.000
Midwest	W	L	Win %
Chicago Steam	13	3	0.812
Chicago Fury	10	7	0.588
Windy City Groove	7	0	1.000
Northern Indiana Monarchs	1	6	0.143
Indy Naptown All-Stars	0	2	0.000
Indiana State Warriors	0	1	0.000
North Central	W	L	Win %
West Michigan Lake Hawks	14	7	0.667
Kalamazoo Pure	12	5	0.706
Flint Chargers	10	6	0.625
Grand Rapids Danger	9	6	0.600
Team NetWork	8	6	0.571
Coast II Coast All-Stars	5	6	0.455
Lansing Sting	1	12	0.077
Oakland County Cowboys	0	10	0.000
Mid-Atlantic	W	L	Win %
Richmond Elite	13	1	0.929
Charlotte Dynasty	4	3	0.571
Fayetteville Flight	3	3	0.500
Hampton Roads Stallions	2	3	0.400
Greenville Galaxy	1	6	0.143
Carolina Coyotes	0	3	0.000
Charleston City Lions	0	5	0.000
Gulf Coast	W	L	Win %
Mobile Bay Tornados	17	0	1.000
Georgia Gwizzlies	7	12	0.368
Atlanta Storm	4	4	0.500
Jackson Showboats	3	6	0.333
Gulf Coast Kingdom Riders	0	3	0.000
Southwest 1	W	L	Win %
West Texas Whirlwinds	11	3	0.786
Texas Sky Riders	10	12	0.455
Tulsa Twisters	7	2	0.778
Dallas Impact	0	8	0.000
Texarkana Panthers	0	6	0.000
Metroplex Lightning	0	3	0.000
Southwest 2	W	L	Win %
Laredo Swarm	19	1	0.950
Austin Boom	10	5	0.667
Texas Red Wolves	8	7	0.533
Texas Fuel	5	5	0.500
Texas Cardinals	0	1	0.000
At-Large	W	L	Win %
Missouri Rhythm	2	2	0.500
Shizouka Gymrats	1	7	0.125
Topeka Aviators	0	2	0.000
Georgia	W	L	Win %
Columbus Blackhawks	9	8	0.529
Georgia Kingz	9	1	0.900
Southwest Warriors	6	12	0.333
Atlanta Storm	4	4	0.500
Atlanta WildCats	3	4	0.429
Atlanta Aliens	1	3	0.250
Birmingham Blitz	1	2	0.333
Hampton Street Pros	0	3	0.000
Florida	W	L	Win %
Jacksonville Giants	22	6	0.786
Miami Midnites	19	3	0.864
South Florida Gold	14	8	0.636
Daytona Beach Sharks	9	8	0.529
Native Pride	1	12	0.077
South Coast Fire	0	6	0.000
Pacific Northwest	W	L	Win %
Everett Evolution	1	2	0.333
Vancouver Balloholics	1	0	1.000
San Francisco Rumble	1	0	1.000
Olympia Rise	0	1	0.000
South Central	W	L	Win %
Bowling Green Bandits	12	3	0.800
Steel City Yellow Jackets	7	7	0.500
West Virginia Wildcatz	2	5	0.286
Columbus Wolves	2	0	1.000
Mid-South Echoes	1	2	0.333
Listed-Never Played	W	L	Win %
Atlanta Red Warriors			0.000
Boston Defenders			0.000
Buckeye Show			0.000
Buffalo 716ers			0.000
Calgary Crush			0.000
California Seakings			0.000
Central Florida Marvel			0.000
Colorado Cougars			0.000
Colorado Kings			0.000
Garland Hoyas			0.000
Gem City Hall O' Famers			0.000
Georgia Pride			0.000
Georgia Thunder			0.000
Hartford Hurricanes			0.000
Jamestown Americans			0.000
Kitsap Admirals			0.000
Lakewood Panthers			0.000
Louisiana Cajun All-Stars			0.000
Memphis Dons			0.000
Oceanside A-Team			0.000
Philadelphia Spirit			0.000
Providence Anchors			0.000
Puro Money			0.000
Salt Lake City Dream			0.000
Schertz Kings			0.000
Seattle Mountaineers			0.000
Wind River Bison			0.000
