= 2013–14 ABA season =

- League: American Basketball Association
- Sport: Basketball

Regular season

2014 ABA Playoffs

2014 ABA Championship
- Champions: Shreveport/Bossier Mavericks
- Runners-up: Jacksonville Giants

ABA seasons
- ← 2012–13 2014–15 →

The 2013–14 ABA season was the 13th season of the American Basketball Association. The season began in late 2013 and ended in March 2014.

The ABA announced that the quarterfinals, semifinals and championship games would be aired on ESPN 3.

== Standings ==
These are the final standings

North Central Division	W	L	Win %
Chicago Steam	15	1	0.938
Oakland County Firebirds	9	3	0.750
West Michigan Lake Hawks	5	3	0.625
Midwest Flames	4	2	0.667
Detroit Hoops	0	1	0.000
Northeast Division	W	L	Win %
Jersey Express	9	2	0.818
North Shore Tide	3	2	0.600
Staten Island Vipers	2	3	0.400
Bronx Holy Flames	0	4	0.000
New York Jamm	0	1	0.000
Mid-Atlantic Division	W	L	Win %
Richmond Elite	15	1	0.938
Charleston City Lions	8	4	0.667
Fayetteville Flight	7	11	0.389
Carolina Coyotes	7	7	0.500
Seven City Knights	4	8	0.333
Hampton Roads Stallions	3	8	0.273
Greenville Galaxy	2	12	0.143
Southeast Division-1	W	L	Win %
Atlanta Wildcats	14	0	1.000
Birmingham Blitz	7	4	0.636
Atlanta Aliens	6	6	0.500
Gainesville Heat	5	10	0.333
Southwest Fellowship Warriors	2	9	0.182
Southeast Division-2	W	L	Win %
Jacksonville Giants	26	1	0.963
Montgomery Blackhawks	16	7	0.696
South Florida Gold	15	3	0.833
Georgia Roadrunners	6	2	0.750
South Coast Fire	0	7	0.000
Gulf Coast Division	W	L	Win %
Shreveport/Bossier Mavericks	28	0	1.000
Mobile Bay Tornadoes	7	7	0.500
Jackson Showboats	3	7	0.300
Monroe Magicians	2	1	0.667
New Orleans Cougars	1	4	0.200
Gulf Coast Flash	0	3	0.000
Lake City Kingdom Riders	0	3	0.000
Southwest Division	W	L	Win %
West Texas Whirlwinds	10	2	0.833
North Dallas Vandals	9	2	0.818
Texas Fuel	8	1	0.889
Conway Cyclones	6	2	0.750
South Texas Stingrays	5	0	1.000
Texarkana Panthers	1	5	0.167
Southern California Division	W	L	Win %
Arizona Scorpions	16	4	0.800
Orange County Novastars	13	11	0.542
Inland Empire Invaders	8	10	0.444
Fresno Griffins	6	15	0.286
San Diego Surf	3	8	0.273
Northern California Division	W	L	Win %
Bay Area Matrix	15	1	0.938
Central Valley Titans	6	7	0.462
San Francisco Rumble	3	6	0.333
California Heatwave	2	4	0.333
Pacific Northwest Division	W	L	Win %
Washington Rampage	8	4	0.667
Seattle Mountaineers	6	3	0.667
Lakewood Panthers	10	8	0.556
Kitsap Admirals	5	10	0.333
Tacoma Rise	4	9	0.307
At-Large Division	W	L	Win %
Colorado Kings	16	4	0.800
Georgia Gwizzlies	8	9	0.471
Calgary Crush	6	4	0.600
Missouri Rhythm	5	3	0.625
Grand Prairie Cowboys	0	8	0.000
Southern Illinois Monarchs	0	3	0.000
ABA Travel Teams	W	L	Win %
Team Network	6	7	0.462
Coast II Coast All Stars	4	4	0.500
Chicago Fury	4	1	0.800
Chicago Court Kingz	2	3	0.400
Cleveland All-Pro'ers	1	2	0.333
South Houston Assault	1	2	0.333
Hattiesburg Hornets	1	3	0.250
Metroplex Lighting	1	4	0.200
Shizouka Gymrats	0	11	0.000
Denton Destroyers	0	1	0.000
Listed-Never Played	W	L	Win %
Bahama All-Pro Show	0	0	0.000
Ball World Peace	0	0	0.000
Bluff City Reign	0	0	0.000
Brooklyn Blackout	0	0	0.000
Carolina Cheetahs	0	0	0.000
Carolina Cougars (2011)	0	0	0.000
Carolina Jaguars	0	0	0.000
Columbia Axemen	0	0	0.000
Columbus Life Bearcats	0	0	0.000
East Carolina Trojans	0	0	0.000
Gem City Hall O' Famers	0	0	0.000
Georgia-Lina Hurricanes	0	0	0.000
Ill City Beast	0	0	0.000
Indiana State Warriors	0	0	0.000
Lansing Law	0	0	0.000
Las Estrellas de Chicago	0	0	0.000
Long Beach Rockets	0	0	0.000
Los Angeles Slam	0	0	0.000
Milwaukee Blast	0	0	0.000
Phenix City Bombers	0	0	0.000
Polk County Flame	0	0	0.000
Pontiac Firebirds	0	0	0.000
Riverside Rainmakers	0	0	0.000
West Virginia Blazers	0	0	0.000

== Playoffs ==
Final 8, First Round
Chicago Steam	113
North Dallas Vandals	119
Arizona Scorpions	100
Jersey Express	76

Quarter-Finals
South Florida Gold	134
North Dallas Vandals	105
Arizona Scorpions	95
Bay Area Matrix	71

Semi-Finals
Jacksonville Giants	96
South Florida Gold	93
Shreveport Mavericks	97
Arizona Scorpions	89

Finals (best of 3 games)
Jacksonville Giants	0 Games
Shreveport Mavericks	2 Games
