= American Basketball Association (2000–present) playoff results =

Playoff results for the current ABA

These are playoff results for the current incarnation of the American Basketball Association (ABA).

== Results ==
=== 2000–2001 ===
Division semifinals
4	Detroit Dogs	117
7	Tampa Bay ThunderDawgs	112
5	Memphis Houn'Dawgs	90
6	Indiana Legends	95
1	Chicago Skyliners	112
8	San Diego Wildfire	97
2	Los Angeles Stars	112
3	Kansas City Knights	132

Division finals
4	Detroit Dogs	119
6	Indiana Legends	105
1	Chicago Skyliners	106
3	Kansas City Knights	105

ABA championship
4	Detroit Dogs	107
1	Chicago Skyliners	91

=== 2001–2002 ===
Semifinals
2	Southern California Surf	124
5	Kentucky Pro Cats	111
3	Phoenix Eclipse	112
4	Detroit Dogs	97
1	Kansas City Knights	bye
–
6	Indiana Legends	94
7	Las Vegas Slam	115

Finals
2	Southern California Surf	93
3	Phoenix Eclipse	90
1	Kansas City Knights	110
7	Las Vegas Slam	101

ABA championship
2	Southern California Surf	113
1	Kansas City Knights	118

=== 2003–2004 ===
Semifinals
2	Kansas City Knights	101
7	Jersey Squires	91
3	Juarez Gallos	133
6	Tijuana Dragons	120

Finals
2	Kansas City Knights	100
3	Juarez Gallos	99
1	Long Beach Jam	bye
–

ABA championship
2	Kansas City Knights	123
1	Long Beach Jam	126

=== 2004–2005 ===
Quarterfinals
1	Utah Snowbears	130
14	Tijuana Dragons	115
8	Long Beach Jam	148
9	Las Vegas Rattlers	126
5	Maryland Nighthawks	124
12	New Jersey SkyCats	105
4	Texas Tycoons	94
13	Bellevue Blackhawks	101
3	Mississippi Stingers	96
16	St. Louis Flight	84
6	Kansas City Knights	119
11	Los Angeles Stars	111
7	Harlem Strong Dogs	105
10	Kentucky Colonels	108
2	Arkansas RimRockers	136
15	Ontario Warriors	97

Semifinals
1	Utah Snowbears	130
8	Long Beach Jam	115
5	Maryland Nighthawks	120
13	Bellevue Blackhawks	133
3	Mississippi Stingers	114
6	Kansas City Knights	109
10	Kentucky Colonels	123
2	Arkansas RimRockers	135

Finals
1	Utah Snowbears	forfeit
13	Bellevue Blackhawks	–
3	Mississippi Stingers	105
2	Arkansas RimRockers	117

ABA championship
13	Bellevue Blackhawks	103
2	Arkansas RimRockers	118

=== 2005–2006 ===
Quarterfinals
1	Rochester Razorsharks	126
9	Newark Express	98
7	Atlanta Vision	99
15	Buffalo Rapids	97
6	Pittsburgh Xplosion	115
10	Bellingham Slam	122
3	San Jose Skyrockets	132
18	Los Angeles Aftershock	90
2	Indiana Alley Cats	117
11	Toledo Ice	103
8	Harlem Strong Dogs	107
13	Strong Island Sound	112
5	Maryland Nighthawks	145
12	Montreal Matrix	114
4	SoCal Legends	97
14	Beijing Aoshen Olympian	95

Semifinals
1	Rochester Razorsharks	104
7	Atlanta Vision	85
10	Bellingham Slam	119
3	San Jose Skyrockets	138
2	Indiana Alley Cats	126
13	Strong Island Sound	128
5	Maryland Nighthawks	121
4	SoCal Legends	123

Finals
1	Rochester Razorsharks	106
3	San Jose Skyrockets	103
13	Strong Island Sound	110
4	SoCal Legends	123

ABA championship
1	Rochester Razorsharks	117
4	SoCal Legends	114

==== Wild card round ====
- Rochester Razorsharks (1) received bye to Bracket One Quarterfinal
- Indiana Alley Cats (2) received bye to Bracket Two Quarterfinal
- San Jose Skyrockets (3) received bye to Bracket One Quarterfinal
- SoCal Legends (4) received bye to Bracket Two Quarterfinal
- Maryland Nighthawks (5) received bye to Bracket Two Quarterfinal
- Pittsburgh Xplosion (6) received bye to Bracket One Quarterfinal
- Atlanta Vision (7) received bye to Bracket One Quarterfinal
- Harlem Strong Dogs (8) received bye to Bracket Two Quarterfinal
- Newark Express (9) received bye to Bracket One Quarterfinal
- Bellingham Slam (10) defeated Tacoma Navigators (22) 134–116
- Toledo Ice (11) defeated Detroit Wheels (21) 132–130
- Montreal Matrix (12) defeated Ohio Aviators (23) 140–83
- Strong Island Sound (13) defeated Birmingham Magicians (19) 97–95
- Beijing Aoshen Olympian (14) defeated Fresno Heatwave (20) 134–82
- Buffalo Rapids (15) defeated Boston Frenzy (16) 133–88
- Los Angeles Aftershock (18) defeated Orange County Buzz (17) 91–86

=== 2006–2007 ===
Quarterfinals
1	Vermont Frost Heaves	103
13	Strong Island Sound	75
8	Bellingham Slam	137
19	Hollywood Fame	103
5	Arkansas Aeros	forfeit
11	Mississippi Miracles	–
4	Rochester Razorsharks	forfeit
10	Wilmington Sea Dawgs	–
3	Texas Tycoons	–
14	Detroit Panthers	forfeit
6	Minnesota Ripknees	forfeit
9	Quad City Riverhawks	–
7	Beijing Aoshen Olympian	100
15	San Diego Wildcats	97
2	Jacksonville Jam	91
12	Buffalo Silverbacks	100

Semifinals
1	Vermont Frost Heaves	119
8	Bellingham Slam	103
11	Mississippi Miracles	112
10	Wilmington Sea Dawgs	130
3	Texas Tycoons	125
9	Quad City Riverhawks	123
7	Beijing Aoshen Olympian	121
12	Buffalo Silverbacks	106

Finals
1	Vermont Frost Heaves	113
10	Wilmington Sea Dawgs	85
3	Texas Tycoons	126
7	Beijing Aoshen Olympian	114

ABA championship
1	Vermont Frost Heaves	143
3	Texas Tycoons	95

==== Wild card round ====
- Vermont Frost Heaves (1) received bye to Bracket One Quarterfinal
- Jacksonville Jam (2) received bye to Bracket Two Quarterfinal
- Texas Tycoons (3) received bye to Bracket Two Quarterfinal
- Rochester Razorsharks (4) received bye to Bracket One Quarterfinal
- Arkansas Aeros (5) received bye to Bracket One Quarterfinal
- Minnesota Ripknees (6) received bye to Bracket Two Quarterfinal
- Beijing Aoshen Olympian (7) received bye to Bracket Two Quarterfinal
- Bellingham Slam (8) received bye to Bracket One Quarterfinal
- Quad City Riverhawks (9) defeated Sauk Valley Rollers (17) 100–86
- Wilmington Sea Dawgs (10) defeated Orlando Aces (22) 119–103
- Mississippi Miracles (11) defeated Waco Wranglers (23) 131–119
- Buffalo Silverbacks (12) received bye to Bracket Two Quarterfinal
- Strong Island Sound (13) defeated Quebec City Kebekwa (16) 108–97
- Detroit Panthers (14) defeated Peoria Kings (18) 134–125
- San Diego Wildcats (15) defeated Gallup Outlaws (20) 133–106
- Hollywood Fame (19) defeated Maywood Buzz (21) 143–124

=== 2007–2008 ===
Quarterfinals
1	Vermont Frost Heaves	bye
8	Long Beach Breakers	115
11	San Francisco Rumble	129
4	Texas Tycoons	bye
6	Quebec Kebs	bye
2	Manchester Millrats	bye
9	Montreal Royal	118
10	Jersey Express	110
3	San Diego Wildcats	bye
7	Atlanta Vision	bye

Semifinals
1	Vermont Frost Heaves	118
11	San Francisco Rumble	93
4	Texas Tycoons	122
6	Quebec Kebs	120
2	Manchester Millrats	146
9	Montreal Royal	140
3	San Diego Wildcats	145
7	Atlanta Vision	99

Finals
1	Vermont Frost Heaves	106
4	Texas Tycoons	100
2	Manchester Millrats	109
3	San Diego Wildcats	115

ABA championship
1	Vermont Frost Heaves	87
3	San Diego Wildcats	84

==== Wild card round ====
- Vermont Frost Heaves (1) received bye to Bracket One Quarterfinal
- Manchester Millrats (2) received bye to Bracket Two Quarterfinal
- San Diego Wildcats (3) received bye to Bracket Two Quarterfinal
- Texas Tycoons (4) received bye to Bracket One Quarterfinal
- Quebec City Kebekwa (6) received bye to Bracket One Quarterfinal
- Atlanta Vision (7) received bye to Bracket Two Quarterfinal
- Long Beach Breakers (8) defeated Maywood Buzz (12) 120–102
- Montreal Royal (9) received bye to Bracket Two Quarterfinal
- Jersey Express (10) received bye to Bracket Two Quarterfinal
- San Francisco Rumble (11) defeated Orange County Gladiators (5) 132–126

=== 2008–2009 ===
Quarterfinals
1	Southeast Texas Mustangs	121
8	Knoxville Thunderbolts	87
4	Kentucky Bisons	106
5	Beijing Aoshen Olympian	104
3	Nashville Broncs	118
6	Jersey Express	99
2	Maywood Buzz	91
7	Chicago Steam	82

Semifinals
1	Southeast Texas Mustangs	89
4	Kentucky Bisons	107
3	Nashville Broncs	111
2	Maywood Buzz	120

ABA championship
4	Kentucky Bisons	127
2	Maywood Buzz	120

=== 2009–2010 ===
Quarterfinals
3	Bluegrass Stallions
Elmira Red Riders
2	Chicago Steam
9	Lake Michigan Admirals
4	Kentucky Bisons
14	West Virginia Blazers
8	West Texas Whirlwinds
Texas Fuel
10	Los Angeles Slam
So Cal Tournament Winner
6	San Francisco Rumble
Sacramento Heatwave

Semifinals
5	Jersey Express	91
Bluegrass Stallions	99
Chicago Steam	106
Kentucky Bisons	114
1	Southeast Texas Mavericks	146
Texas Fuel	84
Los Angeles Slam
San Francisco Rumble

Finals
Bluegrass Stallions	100
Kentucky Bisons	91
Southeast Texas Mavericks
San Francisco Rumble	Forfeit

ABA championship
Kentucky Bisons	99, 83, 76
Southeast Texas Mavericks	96, 104, 85

Notes: Finals was a best of 3 series. ABA did not release the game results for the first round, or the winners of the regional first round tournaments.

=== 2010–2011 ===
Elite Eight
12	Lake Michigan Admirals	97
4	East Kentucky Energy	110
16	Gulf Coast Flash	148
3	Colorado Kings	136

Final Four
4	East Kentucky Energy
1	Southeast Texas Mavericks	*
16	Gulf Coast Flash
2	Jacksonville Giants	*

ABA championship
Southeast Texas Mavericks	*
Jacksonville Giants

=== 2013–2014 ===
Final 8, First Round
Chicago Steam	113
North Dallas Vandals	119
Arizona Scorpions	100
Jersey Express	76

Quarter-Finals
South Florida Gold	134
North Dallas Vandals	105
Arizona Scorpions	95
Bay Area Matrix	71

Semi-Finals
Jacksonville Giants	96
South Florida Gold	93
Shreveport Mavericks	97
Arizona Scorpions	89

Finals (best of 3 games)
Jacksonville Giants	0 Games
Shreveport Mavericks	2 Games

=== 2023–2024 ===
Region Semifinals
1	Indiana Lyons	122
4	Peoria Pitbulls	117
2	Chicago Fury	117
3	Burning River Buckets	90
1	Providence Pirates	149
4	Coney Island Thunder	111
2	Wyoming Valley Clutch	105
3	Binghamton Bulldogs	118
1	Atlanta Aliens	115
4	Mississippi Silverbacks	118
2	Nassau Pride	120
3	Western Oklahoma Bulls	115
1	Silicon Valley Panthers	111
3	Team Trouble	101
2	Las Vegas Royals	123
4	New Mexico Bullsnakes	128

Region Finals
1	Indiana Lyons	80
2	Chicago Fury	102
1	Providence Pirates	108
3	Binghamton Bulldogs	111
4	Mississippi Silverbacks	117
2	Nassau Pride	108
1	Silicon Valley Panthers	141
4	New Mexico Bullsnakes	112

Final Four
1	Binghamton Bulldogs	104
4	Mississippi Silverbacks	105
2	Chicago Fury	91
3	Silicon Valley Panthers	90

ABA Championship
4	Mississippi Silverbacks	123
2	Chicago Fury	126

=== 2024–2025 ===
Region Semifinals
1	Chicago Fury	100
4	Steel City Yellow Jackets	86
2	Nashville Aces	131
3	402 Elite	138
1	Buffalo eXtreme	117
4	Wyoming Valley Clutch	95
2	Jersey Express	119
3	New England Lightning	87
1	Austin Bats	105
4	Atlanta Aliens	101
2	Gulf Coast Gladiators	115
3	Kissimmee Lambs	108
1	Silicon Valley Panthers	152
4	San Jose Wolfpack	130
2	Guy Levy Legends	103
3	Tucson Buckets	91

Region Finals
1	Chicago Fury	113
3	402 Elite	98
1	Buffalo eXtreme	99
2	Jersey Express	91
1	Austin Bats	130
2	Gulf Coast Gladiators	118
1	Silicon Valley Panthers	117
2	Guy Levy Legends	88

Final Four
1	Chicago Fury	104
4	Austin Bats	103
2	Silicon Valley Panthers	93
3	Buffalo eXtreme	85

ABA Championship
1	Chicago Fury	131
2	Silicon Valley Panthers	122

=== 2025–2026 ===
Region Semifinals
1	Nashville Aces	137
4	Steel City Yellow Jackets	118
2	Chicago Fury	110
3	402 Elite	83
1	Buffalo eXtreme	105
4	New England Lightning	71
2	Hartford Colts	124
3	Dover Dawgs	95
1	Austin Bats	98
4	Mississippi Silverbacks	96
2	Chattanooga Strike	99
3	Florida Tropics	106
1	Silicon Valley Panthers	154
4	San Jose Wolfpack	141
2	Las Vegas Royals	106
3	San Diego Suns	117

Region Finals
1	Nashville Aces	117
2	Chicago Fury	109
1	Buffalo eXtreme	122
2	Hartford Colts	110
1	Austin Bats	105
3	Florida Tropics	101
1	Silicon Valley Panthers	150
3	San Diego Suns	129

Final Four
1	Silicon Valley Panthers	109
4	Austin Bats	111
2	Buffalo eXtreme	118
3	Nashville Aces	104

ABA Championship
4	Austin Bats	112
2	Buffalo eXtreme	105
