= Kyle Gupton =

American basketball player (born 1990)

Personal information
- Born: January 29, 1990 (age 36) Ypsilanti, Michigan, U.S.
- Listed height: 6 ft 2 in (188 cm)
- Listed weight: 212 lb (96 kg)

Career information
- High school: Lincoln High School (Ypsilanti, Michigan) Belleville High School (Belleville, Michigan)
- College: UIS (2011–13) Henry Ford (2009–11)
- Playing career: 2014–present
- Position: Shooting guard
- Number: 12

Career history
- 2014-2015: Team Network
- 2015-2017: Tamworth Thunderbolts
- 2018-2019: VfL Edewecht Wattworms
- 2021-2021: Detroit Cobras
- 2022-2023: Pontiac Pharaohs
- 2023: Tamworth Thunderbolts
- 2024: P.H Diamonds

Career highlights
- 3x Scoring Champion (2019, 2023, 2024); 3x Cup Champion; + 1,000 Tamworth Thunderbolts Points: Most Wattworms Points in a season (706); 2022 ICE Shootout Champion; 2017 Waratah League All-Star 5 Team: 2014–15 ABA All-Star Honors; + 1,000 collegiate points; 2013 All GLVC Conference Team; 2013 UIS Male Athlete of the Year

Kyle Gupton (born January 29, 1990) is an American professional basketball player, who plays for TNC. He’s a two-time Cup Champion, a two-time Scoring Champion, and the University of Illinois Springfield Athlete of the Year. At UIS, he was an all-conference selection by the GLVC, and ranks in the record books for three-pointers made.

== College career ==
In the summer of 2008, Gupton was sidelined with a minor heart condition. He made a full recovery, and returned to the court the following season. He attended the two-year school, Henry Ford College, where he was one of four standout sophomores to sign with a four-year university. He signed with the University of Illinois at Springfield for his final two collegiate years. The UIS Prairie Stars are a part of the Great Lakes Valley Conference. In his junior season, he averaged 10.7 points per game and made a total of 56 three-pointers, which was the most in school history during the school's NCAA era. In his senior year, he scored 26 points and made 6 three-pointers to defeat University of Southern Indiana, who was ranked 10th in the nation. His 6 three-pointers was a school record at the time, and it happened four other times in his UIS career. After a severe toe hyperextension injury, Gupton still maintained his consistent scoring ability, and led the team in scoring his senior year. He finished his senior season with an average of 12 points per game, and he passed his own record for three-pointers, with a made total of 64. Gupton was a UIS standout, and finished his Prairie Stars career with a total of 597 points, made 120 three-pointers, and shot 40% from the three-point line. He also earned the 2013 Male Athlete of the Year Award, made the All Great Lakes Valley Conference Team, was named the UIS Men's Basketball Most Outstanding Player Award. He finished his UIS career with 597 points, and his 120 three-pointers ranks first in school history among transfer players, and third overall. He scored a total of over 1,000 points in his four-year college career. During the season, he also worked with many local students, as a role model during the second half of his senior year.

== Professional career ==
=== Team Network ===
Gupton was selected to play for Team Network in the American Basketball Association in 2014. The team was stationed in the metro Detroit area, which was located near his area of residence. In his rookie debut, he recorded 18 points, 4 assists, and 4 rebounds in a home win against the cross town rivals, Oakland County Cowboys. He was the only rookie on the team, and started a majority of the games that he played in. His rookie-best was on November 9, 2014, when he scored 41 points against the Steel City Yellow Jackets, while converting eight three-pointers. He scored double figures in every game, received ABA All Star honors, and led his team to the first round of the ABA playoffs. His final averages were 22.0 points, 4.0 rebounds and 3.5 assists per game. As a rookie, Gupton lead the team in scoring, three-pointers made and three-point percentage.

=== Tamworth Thunderbolts ===
In 2015, he reunited with his family and church, to play for the International Gospel Center. He would lead the team with 24.8 points per game, and the team would go undefeated and win the Bishop's Cup Championship. Shortly after, he continued his professional career by signing with the Tamworth Thunderbolts of Australia, who are a part of the Waratah League (Division I). Shortly after he arrived, the Thunderbolts won the Prawn Bowl Championship, and the Thunderbolts would have success throughout their entire season. He scored a season-high of 31 points in a home win against the Central Coast Waves. Gupton finished with an average of 20.3 points per game, and shot 40% from the three-point line.

=== The Return to Tamworth ===
In the winter of 2016, he signed again with the Thunderbolts for a second season. Upon his return, he became an unstoppable scoring force. His most memorable game was on May 5, 2017, when he scored 31 points in an 81–75 win in Tamworth against the Hills Hornets of Sydney. He connected on five three-pointers, including an off balance three-pointer in the fourth quarter as the shot clock expired late in the fourth quarter. He finished with a game-high of 31 points, in what was described as one of his best games with the Tamworth Thunderbolts. He scored a season-high was 34 points on May 20, 2017, in a home win against the Coffs Harbour Suns. On July 10, 2017, he tied his season-high of 34 points in a win on the road against the Port Macquarie Dolphins. Gupton would score in double figures in every game throughout the season, finishing with an average of 22.1 points per game, which ranked fifth in the Waratah League. His 464 points ranked first, his 129 field goals ranked second, and his 53 three-pointers ranked fourth. He also shot 46% from beyond the three-point line. He led the Thunderbolts in all of the above categories, including his total of 48 steals. Gupton was the first Tamworth Import to earn a spot on the Waratah League All-Star Five Team. He was also awarded the Tamworth Thunderbolts Most Valuable Player Award. He spent his post-season traveling and running the Kyle Gupton Basketball Camp for players in Tamworth, Gunnedah, Armildale, and a final training session with young players in Quirindi. Gupton was known as a catalyst for the Thunderbolts, and head coach John Ireland described him as one of the best shooters he's ever seen. He has not ruled out the idea of returning to play for the Thunderbolts at some point of his career.

=== Edewecht Wattworms ===
In the late summer of 2018, Gupton signed with the Edewecht Wattworms of the Deutscher Basketball Bund. In his first game he recorded 28 points, 9 steals, 4 assists, and 3 rebounds in a win over the Blue Fire Lions. On October 28, 2018, Gupton recorded 43 points, and converted 11 three-pointers in a win over the Timberwolves. Going into his fifth game, he was leading the league with an average of 32.4 points per game. In the next game on November 10, 2018, Gupton scored 43 points (33 points in the 2nd half) with 6 three-pointers against the TSG Westerstede Eagles. In the last four games of 2018, Gupton scored a total of 167 points and made 29 three-pointers. He scored 40 points or more ten times, and scored 52 points in the final regular season home game. He and the Wattworms became Arne's Cup Champions after the conclusion of the regular season. Gupton recorded 28 points in the win over the Blue Fire Lions for the championship. He led the league in scoring with 706 points, and also ranked first with 85 three-pointers made after playing 18 games. He became the 2018–19 scoring champion with an average of 39.2 points per game. On May 23, 2019, he recorded 56 points in a 110–92 cup game victory over the BTB Royals, a higher-tier team in Lower Saxony.

In 2020, he was set to depart to play in Australia for the Thunderbolts, but the season was cancelled due Covid-19. He decided to use 2020 and early 2021 to workout with players, trainers, and to play in local leagues. He played in Hoop Atlanta, where he averaged 31.5 points per game. While in Georgia, he won the KB Sports Championship with KG's All-Stars, where he scored 21 points in the win.

=== Detroit Cobras ===
In 2021, it was announced that he would play the second half of the season with the Detroit Cobras. During the season, he reached over 2,000 career points, after 78 career games. He led the Cobras in scoring with an average of 25.8 points per game, before the association withdrew from the league.

=== Oakland County Pharaohs ===
In 2022, he agreed to a two-way deal with the Oakland County Pharaohs. His season-high was 28 points, while sinking seven three-pointers against the Sudbury Five. He averaged 22.5 points per game, while shooting 58% from the field, and 54% from behind the three-point line for the season.

=== Tamworth Thunderbolts ===
In late April, Gupton signed a deal with the Tamworth Thunderbolts, returning for his third stint. On July 16, 2023, he scored his Thunderbolts career-high 47 points, along with 5 assists, 5 rebounds, 3 steals, and 2 blocks, in a 99-74 win over the Wagga Wagga Heat. The 18 converted two-point field goals in the game, ranked 2nd of his all-time career. He also surpassed 1,000 career points for the club in that game, while also surpassing 100 three-pointers made for the club. "It felt really good", Gupton said. "I'm thankful for the hard work showing itself, but I'm also thankful for my teammates that screen for me and pass me the ball each game. They've helped me to reach that milestone". From June 3 to August 19, he scored 20 or more points in each game. The streak of games with 10 points or more has extended, as he's done so in each game of his career. Furthermore, his streak for making one three-pointer or more in a game has also extended, dating back to the 2017 season. Gupton concluded the regular season with an average of 26.1 points per game, which clinched the title for the league Scoring Champion. He also tallied 3.6 rebounds per game, 3.3 assists, 2.2 steals, and a total of 11 blocks. He shot 53% from the field, 43% from the three-point line, and 84% from the free-throw line. His final points per game average of 25.7 ranked second overall, and he was ranked 1st in two-point field goals made, with a total of 116. In just 15 games, he scored a total of 385 points, which ranked 5th in the entire league.

=== STFL Tigers & Team Power ===
In April, Gupton signed a two-way contract with the STFL Tigers, of the BML. The deal allowed him to also play for Team Power, a Pro Am Team in Southeast Michigan. There, he scored a season-high and league-high, 70 points in his first game.

== Player profile ==
Gupton is the co-owner of a non-profit called Good Vibes Outreach, which is an organization that focuses on mental health and life empowerment. He also started the "I Shall" movement, which emphasizes on inspiring others to turn aspirations into reality. He’s also writing a book, which will be released in 2024. He has run dozens of development camps for children and young adults. He puts a lot of time into developing players, visiting schools, & assisting in community relation functions. In October 2023, he participated in a charity basketball game, which donated thousands of dollars towards public health deficiencies.

=== Personal life ===
Kyle is the youngest son of Chris and Cindy Gupton. He comes from a basketball family, and has won multiple championships with his brothers and cousins. His brother Corey Gupton starred at Park University for four years. He then played in the American Basketball Association and the Premier Basketball League for the Detroit Panthers, and is known for his energy and efficient hook shot. Corey is currently into acting, and has been featured in Black Panther, Oprah Winfery's Queen Sugar, Coming 2 America, The Walking Dead, Avengers: Infinity War , Avengers: Endgame, and many other media productions. His brother Kenny earned All-State honors at Henry Ford College, and starred in the American Basketball Association for the Detroit Hoops. Kenny is known for his ability to handle the ball and score efficiently with his athletic ability. With the exception of his mother, Kyle is the shortest in his family.

== Professional statistics ==
Year	Team	MPG	FG%	3P%	FT%	RPG	APG	SPG	BPG	PPG
2014–15	Team Network	32.2	.464	.461	.833	4.0	3.5	1.2	.3	22.0
2015–16	Tamworth Thunderbolts	26.8	.481	.404	.752	3.6	3.3	2.9	.3	20.3
2016–17	Tamworth Thunderbolts	26.5	.483	.464	.834	3.8	3.8	2.1	.4	22.1
2018–19	Edewecht Wattworms	36.2	.485	.432	.767	4.6	4.7	4.7	.2	39.2
2021	Detroit Cobras	33.1	.472	.413	.778	5.2	4.8	2.8	.3	25.8
2022-23	Pontiac Pharaohs	33.4	.583	.538	100	3.1	2.9	2.1	.2	22.5
2023	Tamworth Thunderbolts	35.2	.533	.432	.841	3.6	3.3	2.2	1.3	25.7
