= Birmingham Blitz (disambiguation) =

Birmingham Blitz may refer to:

- Birmingham Blitz; the bombing of Birmingham, England, during the Blitz.
- Birmingham Blitz (basketball); basketball team based in Birmingham, Alabama.
- Birmingham Blitz Dames; roller derby league based in Birmingham, England.
