= Lou White =

American basketball player

Louis White (also known as Lou; born May 12, 1976) is an American basketball player who plays for Barreteros de Zacatecas in the Mexican Liga Nacional de Baloncesto Profesional. He is 6 feet 4 inches (193 cm) tall and plays guard. He graduated from Gwynn Park High School in Brandywine, Maryland, and also attended Fork Union Military Academy in Fork Union, Virginia, for his freshman and sophomore years in high school. He attended University of South Carolina before transferring to Voorhees College in Denmark, South Carolina, where he played as a point guard/shooting guard.

After White left college, he played for a number of professional and semi-professional teams: the Baltimore Blaze, Fresno Heatwave, Idaho Stampede, Michigan Mayhem, Brooklyn Kings, Gary Steelheads, Colorado 14ers, Pennsylvania Valleydawgs, Sioux Falls Skyforce, and the Texas Legends. He played in the Dominican Republic again in 2008–2009 season. In 2009–2010, he played for the Maryland Greenhawks, and in 2010–2011 he played for the Tri-City Suns. He signed with the Barreteros de Zacatecas for the 2011–2012 season.

== College ==
White completed his college basketball career at Voorhees College in Denmark, South Carolina, was a three-time NAIA All-American, and also led the nation in scoring his senior season with 25.7 ppg (1999–2000).

White's play record with Voorhees College (NAIA D-1) from 1997–2000 is as follows:

- 1997–1998: 29 games: 17.4 ppg, 4.8 rpg, 2.8 asp
- 1998–1999: 34 games: 18.7 ppg, 10.3 rpg, 3.9 apg
- 1999–2000: 31 games: 25.7 ppg, 5.1 rpg, 4.1 apg

== Professional career ==
(2000–2001)
Billings Rim-rockers (USA-IBA)
24 games: (14 mpg) 7.9ppg; 2.1rpg, 2.4apg
(Spring 2001)
Indios San Francisco De Marcois (LIDOBA – Dom. Rep)
20 games: 27.0 ppg, 7.0 rpg, 6.5 apg
(2001–2002)
Baltimore Blaze (USA- NRL)
16 games: 16.7ppg, 7.2 rpg, 3.9 apg
(2002–2003)
SBA Touring Team (Amsterdam, the Netherlands)
Haarlem Basketball Week
4 games: 14.4 ppg, 6.0 rpg, 5.3 apg
(Summer 2003)
Duarte Sigue (Dom. Rep- LIDOBA)
22 games: 20.1 ppg, 5.0 rpg, 3.9 apg
(2003–2004)
Fresno Heatwave (USA- ABA)
36 games: 19.5 ppg, 7.9 rpg, 6.8 apg
(Summer 2004)
Pennsylvania Valley Dawgs (USA- USBL)
23 games: 9.7 ppg, 3.0 rpg, 3.3 apg
(2004–2005)
Idaho Stampede (USA-D-league)
44 games: 7.1 ppg, 3.4 rpg, 3.9 apg
(2005–2006)
Michigan Mayhem (USA – CBA)
44 games: 8.9ppg, 2.7rpg, 3.4apg, 2.3spg,
(Summer 2006)
Brooklyn Kings (USA- USBL)
21 games: 13.1 ppg, 5.0 rpg, 4.9 apg
(Summer 2006)
Constituyentes de San Cristobal (Dom.Rep-LIDOBA)
10 games: 12.4 ppg, 4.3 rpg, 3.6 apg
(Summer 2007)
Gary Steelheads (USA- USBL)
25 games: 11.5 ppg, 3.9 rpg, 3.8 apg
(2007–2008)
Texas Legends (USA-D-league)
24 games, 8.8 ppg, 4.2 rpg, 4.7 apg, 2.1 spg
(2008–2009)
Lou spent most of the season injured with stints in Europe: practicing with LeMans MSB (France) and Training with the Libya men's national basketball team from April to July.
(2009–2010)
Maryland Greenhawks (USA-PBL)
24 games, 15.3ppg, 6.1 rpg, 4.0 apg, 2 spg
(2010–2011)
Tri-City Suns (USA-ACPBL)
17 games, 21.4ppg, 7.3rpg, 6.8 apg, 3.2 spg
(2011–2012)
Zacatecas Barreteros (MEX-LNBP)
19 games, 16.6ppg, 5.8 rpg, 4.6 apg, 1.2 spg

== Achievements ==
- 1998–1999: EIAC Conference Champions
- 1998–1999: EIAC Conference Player of the Year
- 1998–1999: NAIA National Tournament Finalist
- 1998–1999: NAIA All-American 2nd Team
- 1999–2000: EIAC Conference Champions
- 1999–2000: EIAC Conference Player of the Year
- 1999–2000: NAIA All- American 1st Team
- 1999–2000: NAIA National Player of the Year
- 2000–2001: Dominican Republic Regional Champion
- 2000–2001: National Rookie League Champion
- 2000–2001: NRL Tournament MVP
- 2002–2003: Dominican Republic National District Champion
- 2003–2004: ABA Newcomer of the Year
- 2004: USBL League Championship
- 2006: USBL Eastern Conference Champion
- 2006: Dominican Republic LIDOBA Season Champion
- 2007–2008: Drafted by the Colorado 14ers, Advanced to Semi finals
- 2011–2012: LNBP Advanced to Second Round of Playoffs
