= Women's American Basketball Association =

American summer women's basketball league

- Sport: Women's basketball
- Founded: 2017; 9 years ago
- First season: 2017
- President: Marsha Blount
- Organizing body: ABA
- Motto: It's Our Time!
- Country: United States
- Most recent champion: Baltimore Lady Wolves
- Website: WABA

The Women's American Basketball Association (WABA) is a summer women's basketball league that began in 2017 with seven teams. It is a sister league of the American Basketball Association.

Marsha Blount, owner of the ABA's Jersey Express, serves as league President and CEO.

== Member teams ==
Teams include by division:

- North Lower Division:
  Baltimore Lady Wolves, Chocolate City Soul, Delaware Lady Dawgs, Maryland Monarchs, Richmond Roadrunners.
- South Division:
  - Subdivision 1:
    Asheville Legends, Augusta Hurricanes, Edgewood Lady Panthers, Mississippi Queens, Raleigh Aces, Winston Salem Lady Warcats
  - Subdivision 2:
    Atlanta Angels, Mount Vernon Shamrocks, Texas Dream
- Midwest
  Michigan Supreme, Midwest Sound, Onpoint Swish, Steel City Queens

== List of WABA championships ==
Year	Champion	Runner-up	Result	Host city	Game MVP	Ref
2017	Jersey Expressions	Orlando Splash	108-96	Newark, NJ	Erika Jones	
2018	Jersey Expressions	Atlanta Angels	115-87	Newark, NJ	Aliyyah Handford	
2019	DC Cyclones	Coastal Empire Lady Monarchs	105-81	Washington, DC	Kyah Proctor	
2020	Not held due to COVID-19					
2021	Jacksonville Force	Midwest Sound	85-79	Augusta, GA	LaSonja Edwards	
2022	Atlanta Angels	Mount Vernon Shamrocks	96-78	Greensboro, NC	Chancie Dunn	
2023	DC Cyclones	Raleigh Red Storm	64-62	Greensboro, NC	Keyanna Tate	
2024	Raleigh Aces	DC Cyclones	84-78	Greensboro, NC	Imani Watkins	
2025	Baltimore Lady Wolves	Augusta Hurricanes	120-57	Florissant, MO	Octavia Jett-Wilson	
