= Glen Dandridge =

American basketball player (born 1985)

Free agent
- Position: Small forward / shooting guard

Personal information
- Born: July 16, 1985 (age 41)
- Listed height: 6 ft 6 in (1.98 m)
- Listed weight: 220 lb (100 kg)

Career information
- High school: Goochland (Goochland, Virginia); Mount Zion Christian Academy (Durham, North Carolina)
- College: Missouri (2004–2007); Lambuth (2007–2008)
- NBA draft: 2008: undrafted
- Playing career: 2009–2015

Career history
- 2009: Halifax Rainmen
- 2009: Quebec Kebs
- 2010: Rochester Razorsharks
- 2010–2011: San Diego Surf
- 2011–2012: RSB Berkane
- 2012–2013: Belgacom Spirou
- 2013: VOO Wolves Verviers-Pepinster
- 2014: Canterbury Rams
- 2014: Timba Timișoara
- 2015: Karpoš Sokoli

Career highlights
- Belgian League champion (2013); Moroccan League champion (2012); First-team NAIA D1 All-American (2008); TSAC Player of the Year (2008); First-team All-TSAC (2008)

Glen Dandridge (born July 16, 1985) is an American former professional basketball player. He played college basketball for the University of Missouri and Lambuth University before having a seven-year professional career.

== High school career ==
After averaging 23 points per game as a sophomore at Goochland High School in Goochland, Virginia, Dandridge transferred to Mount Zion Christian Academy in Durham, North Carolina, for his junior and senior years. He averaged 18 points and nine rebounds as a junior and 18 points and seven rebounds as a senior.

== College career ==
After being a minor rotation player in his first two seasons at Missouri, Dandridge battled through injuries, including a stress fracture in his foot, as a junior in 2006–07. In 72 games over three seasons at Missouri, Dandridge started five games and averaged 2.0 points in 6.8 minutes per game.

In 2007, Dandridge transferred to Lambuth University. By transferring to Lambuth, a Division II school, he was eligible to play without skipping a year. Lambuth reached the NAIA quarterfinals, while Dandridge averaged 15 points and five rebounds and was named first-team NAIA All-American.

== Professional career ==
In December 2008, Dandridge signed with the Halifax Rainmen for the 2009 PBL season. In March 2009, he was traded to the Quebec Kebs.

In November 2009, Dandridge signed with the Rochester Razorsharks for the 2010 PBL season. In 25 games for Rochester, he averaged 14.0 points, 3.7 rebounds and 1.8 assists per game.

After initially signing with Argentinian team Monte Hermoso Basket for the 2010–11 season, Dandridge joined the San Diego Surf of the American Basketball Association in November 2010.

Dandridge spent the 2011–12 season playing in Morocco for RSB Berkane, helping the team win the league championship and averaging 24 points, seven rebounds and three assists per game.

In August 2012, Dandridge joined Belgian team Belgacom Spirou for a one-month trial. He continued on with the team long term, but an injury forced him out until February 2013. In 18 games for Spirou, he averaged 5.7 points per game.

After playing for the Orlando Magic during the 2013 NBA Summer League, Dandridge had a seven-game stint with Belgian team VOO Wolves Verviers-Pepinster.

In January 2014, Dandridge signed with the Canterbury Rams for the 2014 New Zealand NBL season. On April 25, 2014, he equalled an NBL record for most three-pointers made in a single game with nine, finishing with 37 points in a 101–92 win over the Manawatu Jets. In June 2014, he suffered a season-ending elbow injury. In 13 games for the Rams, he averaged 18.8 points, 5.6 rebounds, 1.8 assists and 1.0 steals per game.

On September 16, 2014, Dandridge signed with Romanian team Timba Timișoara. On December 1, 2014, he left Timba Timișoara after appearing in just five games.

On October 12, 2015, Dandridge signed with Macedonian team Karpoš Sokoli. He played in 11 games, with his final game coming on December 26, 2015.
