= National Rookie League =

National Rookie League (NRL)
- National Rookie League logo
- Sport: Basketball
- Founded: 2000
- Folded: 2002
- No. of teams: 5
- Country: United States
- Last champion: Baltimore Blaze (1st title)
- Most titles: Baltimore Blaze (1 title)

The National Rookie League (NRL) was an American unaffiliated minor league for the National Basketball Association that completed two summer playing seasons in 2000 and 2001.

The NRL was exclusive to players under the age of 24 and was designed to help prepare the nation's most talented young athletes for a professional basketball career. The NRL offered its players the promise of full tuition at the undergraduate college or university of their choosing once they signed a professional contract and forfeited their college eligibility.

The NRL's inaugural season in 2000 featured six teams: Baltimore Blaze, Charleston WV Travelers, Delaware Destroyers, Gotham City Knights, Philadelphia Force and Washington Justice. On August 6, 2000, the Washington Justice claimed the first NRL title, defeating the Baltimore Blaze 116-113 in triple overtime at the Showplace Arena in Upper Marlboro, Maryland. Washington was coached by Reggie Williams, the former NBA star and Georgetown University standout.

The 2001 season began with five teams: Baltimore Blaze, Delaware Destroyers, Gotham City Knights, Philadelphia Force and Washington Justice. After four games, Gotham City disbanded. On August 9, 2001, the Blaze defeated the Force 100–93 in the NRL Championship Game.

The NRL's co-founders closed the league prior to the 2002 season, citing insufficient operating expenses to run the entire summer schedule. Approximately one-half of the NRL's players went on to play professional basketball in other leagues, including in Asia and Europe.
