= Guy Parselany =

Israeli basketball player (born 1978)

No. 6 – San Diego Surf
- Position: Center

Personal information
- Born: August 1, 1978 (age 48) Haifa, Israel
- Listed height: 7 ft 2 in (2.18 m)
- Listed weight: 238 lb (108 kg)

Career information
- High school: Kiryay Sharet Holon
- College: San Jecinto TX University of Mobile AL
- Playing career: 1994–2009

Career history
- 1994–1995: Hapoel Haifa (Israel)
- 1995–1996: Maccabi Tel-Aviv Hapoel Holon (Israel)
- 1996–1997: Maccabi Haifa (Israel)
- 1997–1999: Hapoel Haifa (Israel)
- 1999–2000: Maccabi Haifa (Israel)
- 2000–2004: Houston Rockets TX, University of Mobile AL (USA)
- 2004–2005: Maccabi Haifa (Israel)
- 2005–2006: Maccabi Qiryat Motzkin (Israel)
- 2006–2007: Hapoel Kfar Saba (Israel)
- 2007–2009: Ironi Kiryat Ata (Israel)
- 2011–present: San Diego Surf

Career highlights
- Israeli Super League Champion; Israeli Cup; High School Championships; Israeli National Basketball Team

Guy Parselany (Hebrew: גיא פרסלני; born August 1, 1978) is an Israeli professional basketball player with the who played in Europe and USA NBA-Summer Leagues and ABA San Diego Surf of the American Basketball Association (ABA).

He is 7 ft 2 in (2.18 m) tall, and plays the center position. Guy Parselany is the tallest professional Israeli basketball player ever.

== Early life ==
Guy Parselany is Jewish, was born in Haifa, Israel, and grew up in Qiryat Haim. He is the son of Arie and Roth, and has two younger brothers, Roy and Tal Parselany. As a child Parselany played for Hapoel Haifa B.C. and Maccabi Haifa. When he was 15 he moved to the Hapoel Holon youth team, winning the State Youth Championship. Simultaneously, he played for his high school basketball team.
