= Texarkana Panthers =

- Founded: 2013
- League: ABA (2013-present)
- Team history: Texarkana Panthers (2013-present)
- Based in: Texarkana metropolitan area
- Arena: Hooks High School (TX) Gymnasium
- Colors: Purple, Black
- Owner: Torrell Johnson
- Head coach: Kelvin Howell
- Championships: 0
- Dancers: Purple Illusion

The Texarkana Panthers are a franchise of the American Basketball Association based in the Texarkana metropolitan area in Arkansas and Texas. The team plays in the Southwest Division. Although the Panthers are considered to represent southwest Arkansas (and Texarkana, Arkansas, in particular), the team plays its home games in Hooks, Texas at the Hooks High School Gymnasium. Their inaugural season was the 2013-14 ABA season in which they achieved a record of 1–5.

== History ==
When the team was formed in June 2013 by CEO/Owner Torrell Johnson, it was sometimes referred to as the "Twin City Texarkana Panthers," but that name was never official. Torrell Johnson founded the club because he had always wanted to own his own franchise, and he also wanted to make a difference for the youth in the Texarkana region. Johnson, who grew up in nearby Waldo, Arkansas, started the team with support from his sister and president of the organization, Krystal Johnson.

Some of the first tryouts for the initial 2013-14 team were held on June 22, 2013, at Columbia Christian School in Magnolia, Arkansas. Tryouts for the Panthers' dance team, Purple Illusion, took place on June 29, 2013, in Magnolia.

The team played its first game on November 21, 2013, against the Shreveport-Bossier Mavericks at Hirsch Memorial Coliseum in Shreveport, Louisiana. The first home game for the club was played on December 28, 2013, against the Lake City Kingdom Riders. Community outreach has been a main driving point behind the Panthers' organization. Because of this, they have hosted numerous awareness and appreciation nights, including an HIV awareness night and a military personnel appreciation night.

== Season-by-Season Breakdown ==
Season	League	Division	Finish	Wins	Losses	Pct.	Postseason Results
Texarkana Panthers
2013-14	ABA	Southwest	5th	1	5	.166	
Regular season				1	5	.166	
Playoffs				0	0	.000	
Regular season and Playoffs combined				1	5	.166	
