= Shad Blair =

American basketball player

Personal information
- Born: 1977 or 1978 (age 48–49) Eureka, Montana, U.S.
- Listed height: 6 ft 10 in (2.08 m)
- Listed weight: 215 lb (98 kg)

Career information
- High school: Lincoln County High School (Montana)
- College: Eastfield College
- Playing career: 2014–2015
- Position: Power forward

Career history
- 2014–2015: Atlanta Wildcats

Shad Blair (born 1977 or 1978) is an American former professional basketball player.

== Career ==
After breaking his wrist in college, Blair gave up on pursuing professional basketball for sixteen years. In 2013, he was discovered by Ryan Wetzel, a former professional basketball player, in a local amateur league in Montana. With Wetzel's help, he attended the Las Vegas Overseas Basketball Combine in July 2014. In January 2015, at the age of 37, Blair signed with the Atlanta Wildcats of the American Basketball Association.

== Documentary ==
Blair was the subject of the documentary Never too late.
