= DeRonn Scott =

American basketball player (born 1991)

Personal information
- Born: April 26, 1991 (age 34) Etiwanda, California, U.S.
- Listed height: 6 ft 6 in (1.98 m)
- Listed weight: 180 lb (82 kg)

Career information
- High school: Etiwanda (Rancho Cucamonga, California)
- College: Xavier (Louisiana) (2009–2010); Cal Poly Pomona (2011–2014)
- NBA draft: 2014: undrafted
- Playing career: 2014–2017
- Position: Guard

Career history
- 2014–2015: Providence Sky Chiefs
- 2015: Nelson Giants
- 2015: ZZ Leiden
- 2016–2017: Cape Breton Highlanders

Career highlights
- First-team All-CCAA (2014); Second-team All-CCAA (2013)

Deronn Brady Scott II (born April 26, 1991) is an American former professional basketball player.

== College career ==
Scott played college basketball for Xavier University of Louisiana and Cal Poly Pomona.

== Professional career ==
After graduating from Cal Poly Pomona in 2014, Scott joined the Providence Sky Chiefs of the American Basketball Association. He helped the Sky Chiefs reach a 9–4 record and averaged 13.1 points per game. On January 24, 2015, he signed with the Nelson Giants in New Zealand for the 2015 NBL season. In 19 games for Nelson, he averaged 16.1 points, 3.3 rebounds and 3.2 assists per game.

On August 20, 2015, Scott signed with ZZ Leiden of the Dutch Basketball League. On December 1, 2015, he was released by Leiden after appearing in eight league games and five Europe Cup games.

In December 2016, Scott signed with the Cape Breton Highlanders of the National Basketball League of Canada. In 30 games for the Highlanders, he averaged 9.0 points, 4.2 rebounds and 2.8 assists per game.
