= Kitsap Admirals =

- League: ABA 2012–15; IBL 2013; NABL 2016–2017 MBL 2022–2023
- Founded: 2011
- Arena: Old East Bremerton High School Gym
- Location: Bremerton, Washington
- Team colors: Black, Yellow, White
- Head coach: Ashley Robinson (HC); Michael Wilson (AC)
- Ownership: Ashley Robinson
- Championships: PAC NW 2016; Tacoma Pro–Am 2016; International Chinese Tour 2017; Never Left Behind League 2017; About the Rim 2017; Seattle Pro–Am Summer League West Conference Champs 2016
- Website: KitsapAdmirals.com

The Kitsap Admiral Basketball Club is a semi-professional international feeder program that is based in Bremerton, Washington. It was established in 2011 by former semi-pro basketball player Ashley D. Robinson.

== History ==
On Dec. 19, 2011, the Kitsap Sun announced that the city of Bremerton had landed an ABA franchise. Originally, the Admirals intended to make the Kitsap Sun Pavilion their home venue. However, the building did not meet the arena requirements of the league (regulation hardwood court floor). Unable to renovate the arena, the Kitsap Admirals made Olympic College's Bremer Student Center their home.

The Admirals made their ABA debut on Nov. 3, 2012 at OC against the Seattle Mountaineers. The first basket in team history was a three-pointer by Bremerton graduate Ben Wilson. The Admirals lost to Seattle 97-89. The team earned their first victory in their second game, played on Veterans Day 2012, defeating the Lakewood Panthers at Pierce College.

The Kitsap Admirals Basketball Club is a Washington state non-profit organization. The organization includes the Admirals Prep team, AAU girls and boys programs; and "360 STAND UP!," an anti-bullying program in communities within the 360 area code.

== ABA to NABL ==
"The combination of right time and right place presented itself and we walked through the door," the Robinsons wrote of why they became involved in the Kitsap Admirals. It has long been known what professional sports does for a city and the people that reside there, they wrote. They saw a need in the community and decided to become part of the solution. "The youth and young adults are this generation’s responsibility," they wrote.

Ashley Robinson is a former ABA and IBL player and is well-known in both professional circuits. His character on and off the court caught the attention of then-ABA chairman Don Simms, owner of the Seattle Mountaineers. Simms approached Joe Newman, CEO of the ABA, about the Robinsons owning a franchise and the deal was made.

The Admirals were initially part of the American Basketball Association, or ABA, but now play in the NABL (North American Basketball League), which was established in 2015 in Dallas, Texas. Robinson is West Coast Conference chairman. He is the Head Coach of the Ridgetop Raiders Middle School boys & Asst Coach of the Central Kitsap High School girls basketball team.

The Admirals play at 3030 Wheaton Way, Bremerton, in what was formerly East Bremerton High School.

== Season-by-season ==
| Season | League | W | L | Result | Playoffs |
|---|---|---|---|---|---|
| 2012-13 | ABA | 4 | 10 | 2ND PAC NW | FINALS |
| 2013 | IBL | 0 | 5 | N/A | DNP |
| 2013-14 | ABA | 5 | 10 | 2ND PAC NW | FINALS |
| 2014-15 | ABA | 8 | 8 | 2ND PAC NW | FINALS |
| 2015-16 | INDEPENDENT | 10 | 0 | PAC CHAMPS | CHAMPS |
| 2017 | NABL | 12 | 0 | CONFERENCE CHAMPS | CHAMPS |
