= Robert Cheeks =

American basketball player

Robert Cheeks is a basketball player from Jersey City, New Jersey. He attended St. Bonaventure from 1999 to 2003. He was born in 1980.

He played briefly for the Newark Express in 2005 as a forward. He wore number 12 and played forward for the team. This past season he played in Portugal for Illiabum where he averaged 13 points and 11 rebounds per game.

He is the half-brother of former NBA player and Duke University Tri-Captain Roshown McLeod.
