= Indiana State Warriors =

- Founded: 2011
- League: American Basketball Association
- Team history: Porter County Punishers (2011-12); Indiana State Warriors (2012-2017)
- Based in: Portage, Indiana
- Arena: Portage YMCA
- Colors: Red, black, blue, orange
- Owner: Lisa Benson-Garza
- Head coach: Jason Lane
- Championships: 0

The Indiana State Warriors were a professional basketball team in the American Basketball Association. The team was originally known as the Porter County Punishers.

== History ==
The Warriors are based in Portage, Indiana, playing home games at Portage YMCA.

The Punishers first competed in the ABA during the 2011–12 season, going 0–3. The team changed names before the 2012–13 season when they finished fourth in the Mid-Central Division. The Warriors were 18th in the ABA Power Rankings release on February 17, 2013.

After the 2012–13 season, the team went on hiatus. The club returned for the 2015-16 ABA season.

== Season-by-season record ==
Season	GP	W	L	Division finish	Playoffs W-L	Result
2011-12	3	0	3	4th (of four)	0-0	DNQ
2012-13	8	6	2	4th (of eight)	0-0	DNQ
2015-16	1	0	1	6th (of six)	0-0	DNQ
