= Antoine Joseph =

Haitian professional basketball player (born 1989)

Matero Magic
- Position: Power forward
- League: BAL Qualifying Tournaments

Personal information
- Born: October 27, 1989 (age 37) Port-au-Prince, Haiti
- Listed height: 6 ft 9 in (2.06 m)
- Listed weight: 240 lb (109 kg)

Career information
- High school: Collège Père Foisset
- College: Union University
- Playing career: 2011–present

Career history
- 2011–2012: Torneo Nacional de Ascenso
- 2012–2013: Club Deportivo Pucón
- 2013–2014: Palm Beach Piranahs
- 2014–2015: Georgia Gwizzlies
- 2021: Matero Magic

Antoine Joseph (born October 27, 1989) is a Haitian professional basketball player.

== Early years ==
Joseph was born in Haiti, raised in Pétion-Ville, a suburb of Port-au-Prince. He emigrated to the United States and played college basketball at Union University in Tennessee, a school which has become a haven for many top Haitian talent over the years. He studied business management, and completed all four years obtaining a bachelor's degree.

== Professional career ==
Joseph played for Argentina TNA, and for the Dep. Pucon of Chile in the Liga Movistar. In 2014, he tried out for the Fort Wayne Mad Ants, an NBA Development League team, who is currently attempting a shot at the NBA.

In October 2021, Joseph was on the roster of Zambian champions Matero Magic in the 2022 BAL Qualifying Tournaments.
