= Baltimore Blaze =

Defunct professional basketball team based in Baltimore, Maryland, US

- Founded: 2001
- League: National Rookie League
- Team history: Ceased operations 2002
- Based in: Baltimore, Maryland
- Colors: Red, Blue
- Championships: 1

The Baltimore Blaze were a professional basketball team in the National Rookie League based in Baltimore, Maryland. The team is notable for winning the only NRL Championship in August 2001. With the collapse of the National Rookie League, the team ceased operations.
