= Indiana Lyons =

Semi-pro basketball team in Danville, Indiana

- Founded: 2017
- League: ABA (2017–present)
- Division: Blue
- Region: Central
- Based in: Danville, Indiana
- Arena: Bosstick Gym
- Owner: Tyrone Brown
- Head coach: Vacant
- Championships: 1 (2023)

The Lyons facing off against the Indiana Legends on February 24, 2024

Indiana Lyons are a basketball team based in Danville, Indiana. The team has been a member of the American Basketball Association (ABA) since 2017.

In their sixth season, the Lyons captured the 2023 ABA championship, being declared co-champions with the Burning River Buckets.

== Season-by-season record ==
Overview of Indiana Lyons seasons
Season	W	L	Result	Playoffs
2017–18	14	8	4th in North Central	Did not qualify
2018–19	14	9	2nd in North Central	Did not qualify
2019–20	19	4	1st in North Central	Playoffs cancelled due to COVID-19
2020–21	14	5	6th in ABA	Lost quarter-finals 134–120 (Fury)
2021–22	16	7	8th in ABA	Did not qualify
2022–23	19	6	1st in Mid-West	Won quarter-finals 121–107 (Aliens); Won semi-finals 80–77 (Clutch); Won ABA Championship
2023–24	17	2	1st in Central Red	Won division semi-finals 111–103 (Aces); Won division finals 100–79 (Kings); Won region semi-finals 122–117 (Pitbulls); Lost region finals 80–102 (Fury)
2024–25	20	6	2nd in Central Red	Won division semi-finals 124–87 (Legends); Lost division finals 115–116 (Aces)
2025–26	9	11	3rd in Central Blue	Lost division semi-finals 83–102 (Instigators)
