= Jerry Holman =

American basketball player

Personal information
- Born: December 18, 1979 (age 46)
- Listed height: 6 ft 10 in (2.08 m)
- Listed weight: 222 lb (101 kg)

Career information
- High school: Humboldt (Saint Paul, Minnesota, U.S.)
- College: MCTC (1999–2001); Minnesota (2001–2003)
- Position: Forward / center

Career history
- 2004: Union B La palma
- 2004–2005: Pınar Karşıyaka
- 2006–2007: Galatasaray Café Crown

Jerry Holman (born December 18, 1979) is an American former basketball center. On the international level, he represented the United States national team.

== College career ==
Aftur graduating from Humboldt Senior High School, Holman played collegiately at the Minneapolis Community and Technical College and the University of Minnesota, graduating in 2003.

== Professional career ==
Holman started his professional career in the United States with the Kansas City Knights and Pennsylvania ValleyDawgs. He signed with the Los Angeles Clippers in September 2004 but was waived before the start of the season. He then joined Union B La palma in Spain before signing with Pınar Karşıyaka in Turkey for the rest of the 2004–05 season. He returned to Turkey for the 2006–07 season, playing with Galatasaray Café Crown.

== National team career ==
Holman represented the United States national team at the 2001 Tournament of the Americas where he averaged 11.8 points per game.
