= Vancouver Balloholics =

- Founded: 2014
- Folded: ABA (2017)
- League: ABA (2014–2016); Victory Sports Camps (2017–present)
- Team history: Vancouver Balloholics; ABA (2014–2017) Victory Sports Camp (2017– present)
- Based in: Burnaby, British Columbia
- Arena: BCIT Gymnasium
- Website: Vancouver Balloholics

The Vancouver Balloholics were a Canadian semi-professional basketball team. They started play in the 2014–15 season as a member of the American Basketball Association (ABA). They played in the league's Pacific Northwest Division. The Balloholics played their home games at the British Columbia Institute of Technology BCIT Gymnasium in Burnaby, British Columbia. In 2017 the team became a Training League for Youth Basketball for Victory Sports Camps and training Youth for U11, U12, U15 and U17 Leagues at High Schools and Elementary Schools around Burnaby, British Columbia.
