= Steel City Yellow Jackets =

Basketball team in Pittsburgh, Pennsylvania

- Founded: 2014
- League: ABA
- Division: Blue
- Region: Central
- Based in: Pittsburgh, Pennsylvania
- Arena: A Giving Heart Community Center
- Colors: Black, gold
- Head coach: Averill D. Pippens
- Championships: 1 (2022)
- Cheerleaders: Steel City HoneyBees
- Mascot: Buzz the Bee
- Website: https://www.steelcitybb.com/

The Steel City Yellow Jackets are a basketball team based in Pittsburgh, Pennsylvania. The team is a member of the American Basketball Association. They play their home games at A Giving Heart Community Center.

== History ==
The Yellow Jackets began play on November 8, 2014, as an expansion team competing in the ABA's Northeast Division. The Yellow Jackets played all of their first season home games at the Community College of Allegheny County Allegheny Campus, which is located on Pittsburgh's North Shore, directly behind Heinz Field.

The Steel City Yellow Jackets were originally owned by national recording Hip hop artist Antjuan "Tjuan Benafactor" Washington and Averill 'Ace' Pippens, who also serves as the team's general manager and head coach. Pippens, also known as "Coach Ace", was the assistant coach at Pittsburgh's David B. Oliver High School before becoming assistant, and eventually head coach, of the Penn State McKeesport men's basketball team. Pippens' led Penn State McKeesport to a championship title in 2006.

In April 2018, the Yellow Jackets hosted the ABA All-Star Weekend at A Giving Heart Community Center. Jackets' forward Antonio Reddic was named the All-Star Game's Most Valuable Player.

In 2022, the Yellow Jackets won their first ABA national championship by defeating Team Trouble 123–118. After the game, Jackets' player Kenny Holmes was named the Most Valuable Player of the playoff tournament.

In August 2023, the team announced it would not participate in the 2023–24 ABA season after Averill Pippens was named head coach of Westinghouse High School. Gilmore Cummings and other veteran players from the team attempted to play that season as the Pennsylvania Starz, but were thrown out of the ABA after infringing on the Yellow Jackets' territorial rights by staging a game within Pittsburgh city limits.

The Yellow Jackets returned to play for the 2024-25 ABA season. Although the team struggled to a 5–5 record, they defeated the Columbus Wizards 136–103 to win the ABA Central Blue Division and advance to the 2025 ABA playoffs. Steel City then lost a Region Semifinal matchup to the defending league champion Chicago Fury by a score of 100–86.

The Yellow Jackets finished the 2025–26 season with a 14–2 record. Guards Kenny Holmes and Dylon Cormier were named to the All-ABA First Team. Steel City defeated the Indiana Legends and Hoosier State Instigators in the Divisional Playoffs to claim their fourth division title. The Yellow Jackets would lose in the Region Semifinal of the 2026 ABA playoffs to the Nashville Aces.

== Season-by-season ==
Season	W	L	W%	Result	Playoffs
2014-15	9	4	0.692	2nd in Northeast	Lost Division Final to Philadelphia Spirit
2015-16	6	4	0.600	4th in South Central	Lost Division Quarterfinal to Windy City Groove
2016-17	11	9	0.550	2nd in Chesapeake	Lost Division Semifinal to West Michigan Lake Hawks
2017-18	17	2	0.895	1st in North Central	Lost Division Quarterfinal to Jacksonville Giants
2018-19	16	2	0.889	1st in Mid-Atlantic	Lost Division Quarterfinal to Jacksonville Giants
2019-20	16	3	0.842	3rd North Central	No playoffs held due to COVID-19 pandemic
2020-21	15	3	0.833	4th in ABA	Lost Division Final to Jacksonville Giants
2021-22	15	2	0.882	11th in ABA	Won ABA Championship, defeating Team Trouble
2022-23	14	2	0.875	10th in ABA	Lost Division Quarterfinal to Burning River Buckets
2023–24	Did not play				
2024-25	5	5	0.500	1st in Central Blue	Lost Region Semifinal to Chicago Fury
2025-26	14	2	.875	1st in Central Blue	Lost Region Semifinal to Nashville Aces
Total	138	38	0.784	-	
