= American Basketball Association (2000–present) =

Semi-professional basketball league

- Formerly: ABA 2000
- Sport: Basketball
- Founded: 1999; 27 years ago
- First season: 2000–01
- CEO: Joe Newman
- Motto: More than just a game
- Countries: United States
- Headquarters: Indianapolis, Indiana, U.S.
- Most recent champion: Austin Bats (2026)
- Most titles: Jacksonville Giants (7)
- Broadcaster: SFBN
- Website: ABA Basketball

The American Basketball Association (ABA) is an American semi-professional men's basketball minor league that was founded in 1999.

ABA teams are based in the United States, with one traveling team from Japan. The league previously had international teams based in Canada, China and Mexico. League management maintains low requirements for franchise ownership, and hundreds of ABA teams have either folded or defected to rival leagues.

The league licenses its name and use of ABA trademarks from the National Basketball Association, which absorbed the American Basketball Association (1967–1976) during the ABA–NBA merger. The Women's American Basketball Association has operated as a sister league to the ABA since 2017.

== History ==
=== Launch and suspension, 1999–2002 ===
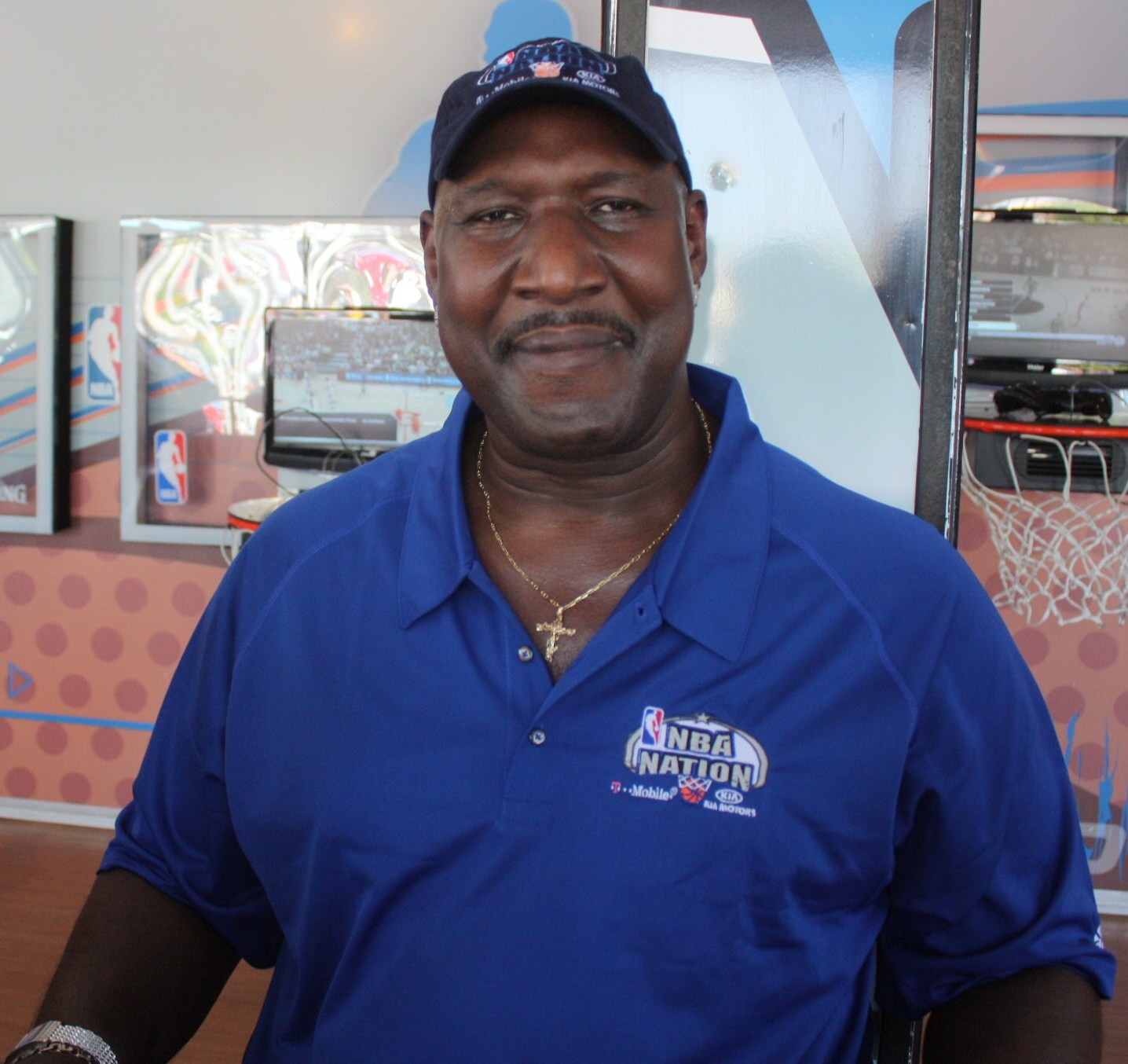
Darryl Dawkins, head coach of the Tampa Bay ThunderDawgs during their 2000–01 season.

The league was originally co-founded by Dick Tinkham and Joe Newman in 1999 as ABA 2000. Tinkham had previously co-founded the Indiana Pacers in the original American Basketball Association, and Newman had been an advertising executive for the Pacers. The National Basketball Association (NBA), owner of the ABA trademark after absorbing many of the original league's teams, sued Tinkham and Newman in December 1999. The lawsuit was unsuccessful since the NBA had failed to actively use the ABA trademark, and the new league entered an agreement with the NBA to license the name for $50,000.

The league began its inaugural 2000–01 season with eight teams: the Chicago Skyliners, Detroit Dogs, Indiana Legends, Kansas City Knights, Los Angeles Stars, Memphis Houn'Dawgs, San Diego Wildfire and Tampa Bay ThunderDawgs. Joe Newman founded the Indiana Legends to replace the Jacksonville Jackals, who were removed from the league after failing to secure a venue. Mark Hamister purchased the rights to a Buffalo franchise for $75,000, but was also unable to secure a venue. A proposed merger with the International Basketball League fell through in December 2000, which would have allowed the inaugural season to begin with additional teams.

To attract fans, the ABA encouraged its teams to fill rosters with former NBA players and past college basketball stars that had local ties. Former NBA champion and Florida native Darryl Dawkins was recruited as the first head coach of the Tampa Bay ThunderDawgs. Upon the league's inception in 2000, each franchise had a limit of 10 players with the salary cap being $900,000.

The first ABA Draft in 2000 was of twelve rounds: the first six rounds reserved for rookies and first-year players, with veterans elible for drafting in the final six rounds. Eddie House of Arizona State was the overall first pick, followed by Scoonie Penn of Ohio State, and former Michigan stars Jimmy King and Maceo Baston. Dennis Rodman and Tim Hardaway were drafted as veterans by the Chicago Skyliners. A.C. Green, Ed O'Bannon and Tyus Edney were selected by the Los Angeles Stars. Dominique Wilkins was drafted by the Anaheim Roadrunners.

The 2001–02 ABA season saw only three teams return from the inaugural season, with the Chicago Skyliners, Los Angeles Stars, Memphis Houn'Dawgs, San Diego Wildfire and Tampa Bay ThunderDawgs replaced by the Kentucky Pro Cats, Las Vegas Slam, Phoenix Eclipse and Southern California Surf.

Joe Newman folded the Indiana Legends after he was sued by eight former players in August 2002 for failing to pay their salaries. Newman had claimed $1 million in losses over two seasons of ownership.

The 2002–03 season was not played, as the league suspended operations for reorganization. Jim Clark, owner of the Kansas City Knights, was named league president and COO in November 2002.

=== Restructuring and defections, 2003–2005 ===
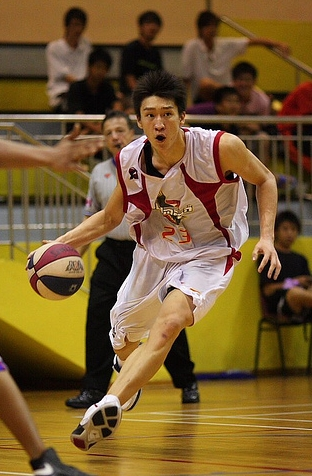
Sun Yue, two-time ABA All-Star who played for the Beijing Aoshen Olympians from 2005 to 2008.

The league resumed play with seven teams for the 2003–04 season. The returning Kansas City Knights were joined by the Fresno Heatwave, Jersey Squires, Las Vegas Rattlers, Juárez Gallos de Pelea, Long Beach Jam and Tijuana Dragons. Dennis Rodman brought national attention to the league when he signed with the Long Beach Jam, leading them to an ABA title in their first season.

The 2004–05 season saw franchise fees lowered from $50,000 to $10,000, and the bond requirement removed in order to attract new teams. Teams were subsequently organized into regional groups to facilitate interest and reduce travel costs, with 37 clubs competing that season in three divisions. The Arkansas RimRockers won the 2004–05 ABA title in their first year of play, but then left with the Long Beach Jam to join the rival NBA Development League.

The ABA welcomed the Beijing Aoshen Olympians beginning with the 2005–06 season, a club which had been banned from the Chinese Basketball League after refusing to allow star prospect Sun Yue to play for the Chinese national team. The Olympians played their home games in Maywood, California. CCTV-5 in China broadcast the team's games, where they were watched by an average of 15 million people.

Following the 2005–06 season in which many teams failed to complete their full schedules and became insolvent, the Charlotte Krunk, Florida Pit Bulls, Indiana Alley Cats, Pittsburgh Xplosion, San Jose Skyrockets and SoCal Legends left to join the rival Continental Basketball Association.

=== Failed coup and formation of PBL, 2006–2008 ===
My idea of success and Newman's differ. I'd rather have fewer teams, that are stable and last, as opposed to having tons that continue to fold. It's not the amount of teams that a league has, it's the amount that finish.

— Tom Doyle, Maryland Nighthawks

In preparation for the league's initial public offering (ABKB), former NBA player John Salley was named league commissioner and Maryland Nighthawks owner Tom Doyle was named league COO in September 2006. Cost for new franchises was subsequently raised to $20,000 for the 2006–07 season. Sports Illustrated writer Alexander Wolff launched the Vermont Frost Heaves, regularly penning articles in the publication about his team's inaugural campaign.

John Salley and Tom Doyle attempted a boardroom coup on behalf of shareholders, with ABA's Board of Directors voting to remove Joe Newman as CEO on January 31, 2007. Newman sued Salley and Doyle, leading to a settlement in which he kept his job and forced their resignations from the league.

The 2006–07 season concluded with the defending champion Rochester Razorsharks withdrawing from the league after they asked to reschedule a playoff game against the Wilmington Sea Dawgs, but were denied and told to forfeit. Following this incident, the Hammond Rollers, Jacksonville Jam, Maryland Nighthawks, Quad City Riverhawks and Wilmington Sea Dawgs joined the Razorsharks in forming the Premier Basketball League (PBL).

Following the 2007–08 season, the reigning champion Vermont Frost Heaves left for the Premier Basketball League along with the Halifax Rainmen, Manchester Millrats and Quebec Kebs.

Quentin Townsend, owner of the Atlanta Vision, was named league President and COO in April 2008. He was later removed from those positions after being arrested in November 2008 for defrauding investors in a scheme to acquire an NBA Development League franchise.

=== CBA absorption and continued instability, 2008–2013 ===
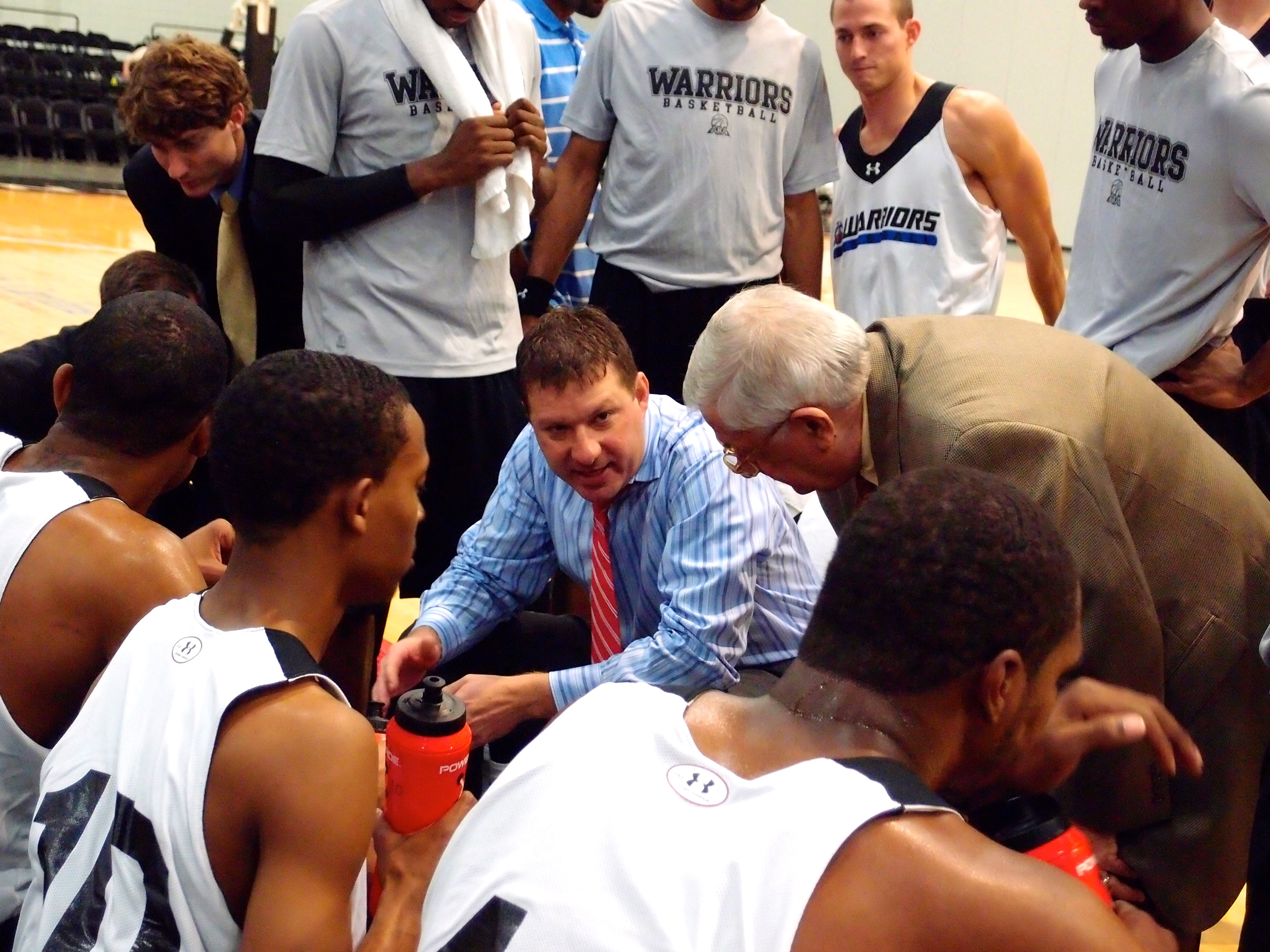
Chris Beard coaching the South Carolina Warriors, who finished their 2011–12 regular season undefeated.

At the start of the 2008–09 season, over 200 teams had folded since the league's inception.

The 2008–09 season saw the Southeast Texas Mustangs franchise join the league after leaving the struggling Continental Basketball Association. The ABA attempted interleague play with the four remaining CBA teams, but their league folded mid-season.

NBA scouts stopped attending the league's games in January 2009, citing the number of cancelled and forfeited contests.

Several teams folded during the 2009–10 season, including the entire Pacific Northwest Division. The San Francisco Rumble forfeited their playoff game against the Southeast Texas Mavericks, as they could not afford to travel for the contest.

Gilas Pilipinas, the Philippine national basketball team, competed in a series of exhibitions against ABA teams including the Clayton Showtime, Los Angeles Slam, Riverside Rainmakers, San Diego Surf and the West Coast All-Stars. This April 2010 series was referred to as the ABA Friendship Games.

Dick Packer was named league President and COO in April 2010.

After winning their second consecutive championship in 2010–11, the Southeast Texas Mavericks publicly opined that the ABA did not have adequate competition, and they left with intentions of joining the NBA Development League. However, their application to join the NBA Development League was denied, and the franchise sat out the 2011–12 and 2012–13 seasons. Consecutive titles were won by the Jacksonville Giants in their absence, with championship wins over the previously undefeated South Carolina Warriors in 2011–12 and North Dallas Vandals in 2012–13. The team returned to the ABA for 2013–14 as the Shreveport-Bossier Mavericks, going undefeated and winning the league title in a perfect season.

=== Management change and ESPN3 deal, 2014–2016 ===
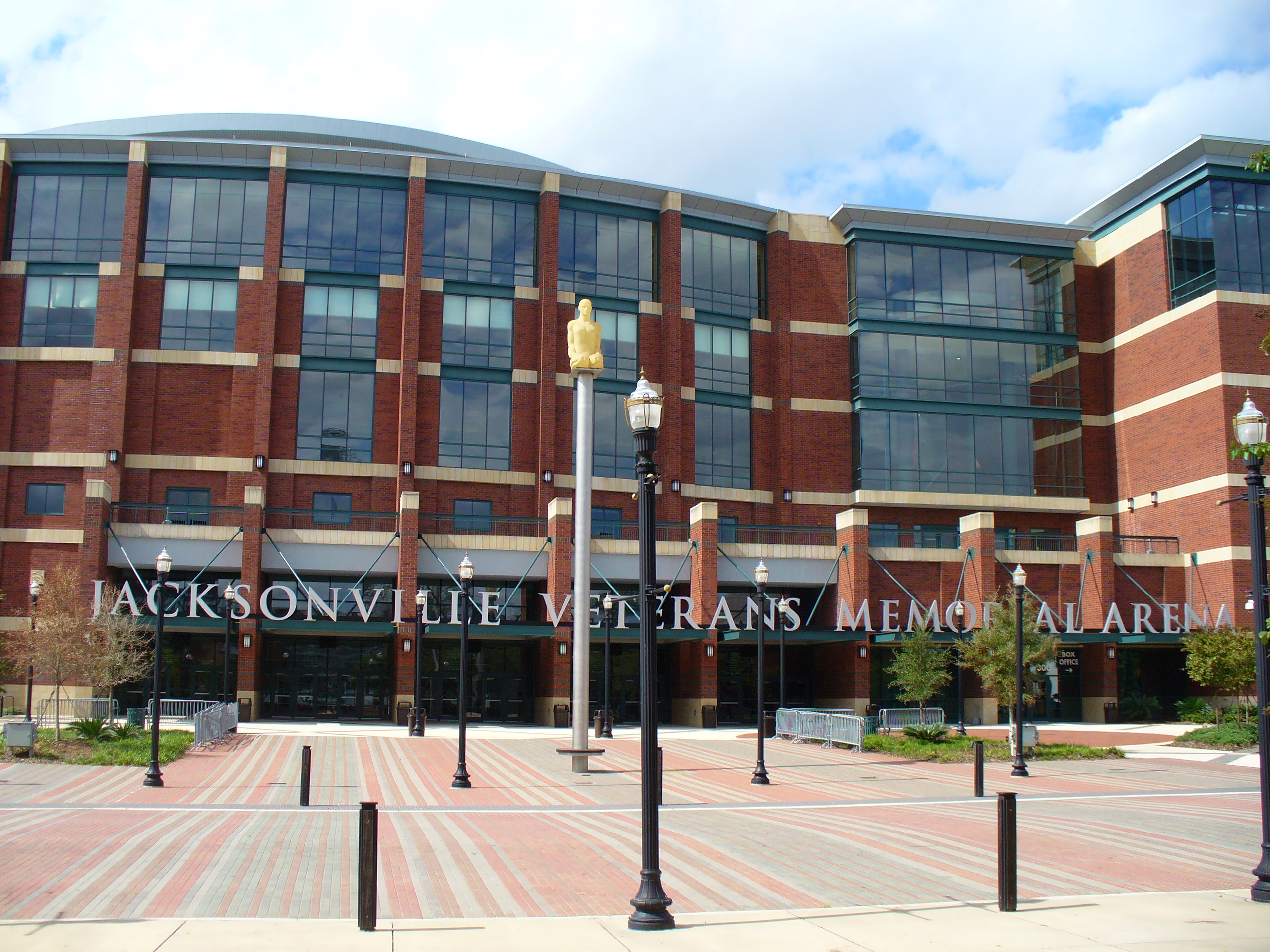
Jacksonville Veterans Memorial Arena, which hosted the largest crowd in ABA history on January 16, 2016.

At the conclusion of the 2013–14 season, over 350 franchises had folded since the league's inception.

Former Arizona Scorpions owner Ron Tilley replaced Joe Newman as league President and CEO following Newman's retirement in July 2014.

The league signed a two-year streaming deal with ESPN3 in August 2014 to broadcast regular season and playoff games beginning with the 2014–15 season.

After completing a perfect season for the second time in 2014–15 and winning their fourth championship, the Shreveport-Bossier Mavericks left the ABA to join the Premier Basketball League.

Joe Newman returned to the role of league President and CEO beginning with the 2015–16 season.

The Jacksonville Giants drew the league's all-time record crowd of 8,987 for their 100–93 victory over the previously unbeaten Chicago Steam at Jacksonville Veterans Memorial Arena on January 16, 2016. It had been reported the week prior that the Orlando Magic was considering adopting the Giants as their NBA Development League affiliate, although later in the year they instead moved their existing affiliate Erie BayHawks to Lakeland, Florida.

=== WABA launch and addition of play-in tournament, 2017–present ===
The Indiana Lyons hosting the Indiana Legends on February 24, 2024.

A sister league, the Women's American Basketball Association (WABA), was launched in 2017. Jersey Express owner Marsha Blount was named the league's President and CEO.

The 2017–18 season saw franchise fees lowered to $2,500.

League co-founder Dick Tinkham died of muscular dystrophy in October 2018.

The 2019–20 season was ended prematurely and the playoffs cancelled due to the COVID-19 pandemic.

The undefeated Jacksonville Giants captured their seventh and final championship in 2020–21, concluding the team's first perfect season and third in ABA history.

A play-in tournament was implemented beginning with the 2021–22 season to determine which teams would advance to the divisional round of the playoffs.

Following elimination from the 2021–22 playoffs by the Steel City Yellow Jackets, the Jacksonville Giants ceased operations.

The Burning River Buckets and Indiana Lyons were declared co-champions of the 2022–23 season after storm damage rendered the venue for their championship game unplayable.

The undefeated Chicago Fury captured their second consecutive championship in 2024–25, concluding the team's first perfect season and fourth in ABA history.

== ABA Draft ==
The first ABA Draft in 2000 was of 12 rounds: the first 6 rounds were reserved for rookies and first-year players, while the clubs could draft veterans in the final 6 rounds. Therefore, big names were drafted by ABA teams. Dennis Rodman and Tim Hardaway were drafted as veterans by Chicago Skyliners (they both played later for ABA teams). A.C. Green, who recently had been waived by Los Angeles Lakers, was selected by Los Angeles Stars, while Dominique Wilkins was drafted by Anaheim Roadrunners. The Stars also picked Ed O'Bannon and Tyus Edney (1999 Euroleague champion) who had won the 1995 NCAA championship as UCLA players.

Eddie House of Arizona State was the overall first pick, followed by Scoonie Penn of Ohio State, while former ormer Michigan stars Jimmy King and Maceo Baston were also drafted.

== Salary cap ==
Upon the league's inception in 2000, each franchise had a limit of 10 players with the salary cap being of $900,000. An ABA average player was paid around $60,000 in 2000. Thus, the league was the second-highest spender in salaries only behind NBA, surpassing established leagues like USBL and CBA. In 2007, it dropped to $120,000 (about $10,000 per player for a 12-player roster) according to Joe Newman.

== Rule changes ==
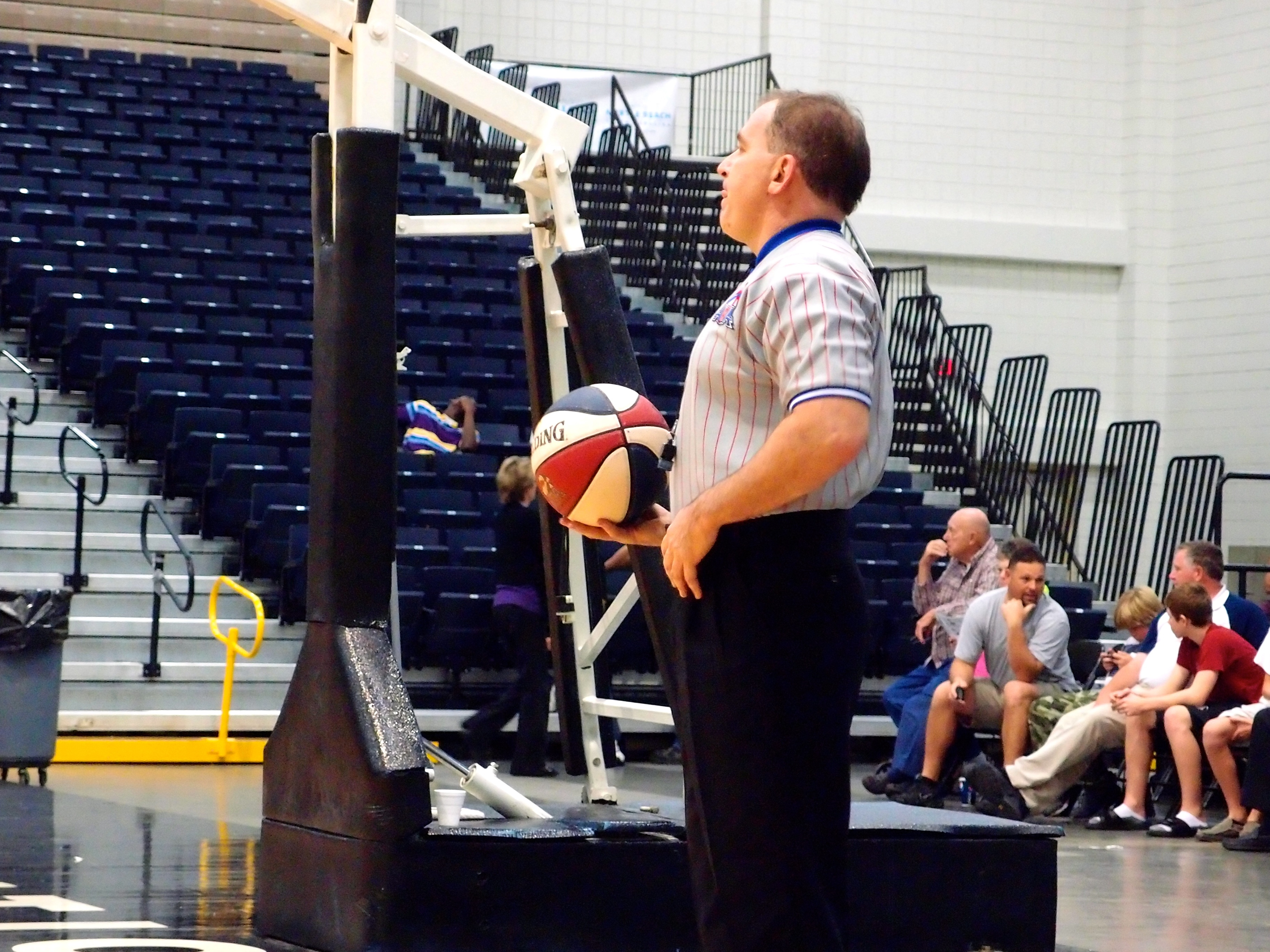
ABA official.

The league employs a number of unconventional rules that are unique to the league:

- Four-point field goal: Shots made from behind the half-court division line are credited as 4 points.
- 3D rule: If a team commits a backcourt violation or turns the ball over in the backcourt, any field goal scored by the opposing team on the ensuing possession shall be awarded an additional point (2-point shots are credited as 3 points, 3-point shots are credited as 4 points, 4-point half-court shots are credited as 5 points). If a player is fouled on their unsuccessful shot attempt while the 3D rule is in effect, they shall receive free throws corresponding with the point value of a successful field goal.
- Basket interference rule: Once the ball hits the rim, any play for the ball by a defender will not be considered goaltending.
- 7 second rule: Each team has seven seconds to bring the ball from backcourt to frontcourt before a backcourt violation is called. If either team is granted a timeout or the ball deflects out of bounds, the count does not reset.
- Seventh foul rule: A player who has committed seven fouls during regulation will be removed from the game and replaced by a bench player. Players who fouled out during regulation will be allowed back into the game for overtime.
- 3–10 & Out: Overtime begins with a single 3-minute period. If the score is still tied, a second untimed overtime period shall commence, and the first team to reach 10 points wins the game.
- 13th man rule: The home team is allowed one additional player to dress for regular season games beyond their normal 12-man squad. This traditionally is a role filled by celebrities and dignitaries as publicity stunts, and such players are not authorized to play an entire game.

== Awards ==
Source:usbasket.com

=== ABA Season MVP ===
Year	Player	Team	Position	Nationality
2001–02	Pete Mickeal	Kansas City Knights	Forward	United States
2003–04	Joe Crispin	Kansas City Knights	Forward	United States
2004–05	Kareem Reid	Arkansas RimRockers	Guard	United States
2005–06	Chris Carrawell	Rochester Razorsharks	Guard	United States
2006–07	-	-	-	-
2007–08	-	-	-	-
2008–09	Boris Siakanm/ Deron Rutledge	Kentucky Bisons/ Southeast Texas Mustangs	Forward/ Center	United States
2009–10	Josh Pace/ Jermaine Blackburn	Southeast Texas Mavericks	Center/ Forward	United States
2010–11	Odell Bradley	Southeast Texas Mavericks	Guard	United States
2011–12	Jermaine “Slim” Bell	Jacksonville Giants	Forward	United States
2012–13	Jermaine “Slim” Bell	Jacksonville Giants	Forward	United States

=== ABA Final-8 MVP ===
Year	Player	Team	Position	Nationality
2000–01	Gee Gervin / Ndongo N'Diaye	Chicago Skyliners	Guard/Center	United States
2001–02	Pete Mickeal	Kansas City Knights	Forward	United States
2003–04	Joe Crispin	Kansas City Knights	Forward	United States
2004–05	Kareem Reid	Arkansas RimRockers	Guard	United States
2005–06	Chris Carrawell	Rochester Razorsharks	Guard	United States
2006–07	-	-	-	-
2007–08	Dwuan Rice	Vermont Frost Heaves	Guard	United States
2008–09	Michael James	Kentucky Bisons	Guard	United States
2009–10	Josh Pace	Southeast Texas Mavericks	Center	United States
2010–11	P.J. Couisnard	Southeast Texas Mavericks	Forward	United States
2011–12	Jermaine “Slim” Bell	Jacksonville Giants	Forward	United States
2012–13	Jermaine “Slim” Bell	Jacksonville Giants	Forward	United States

== Member Teams ==
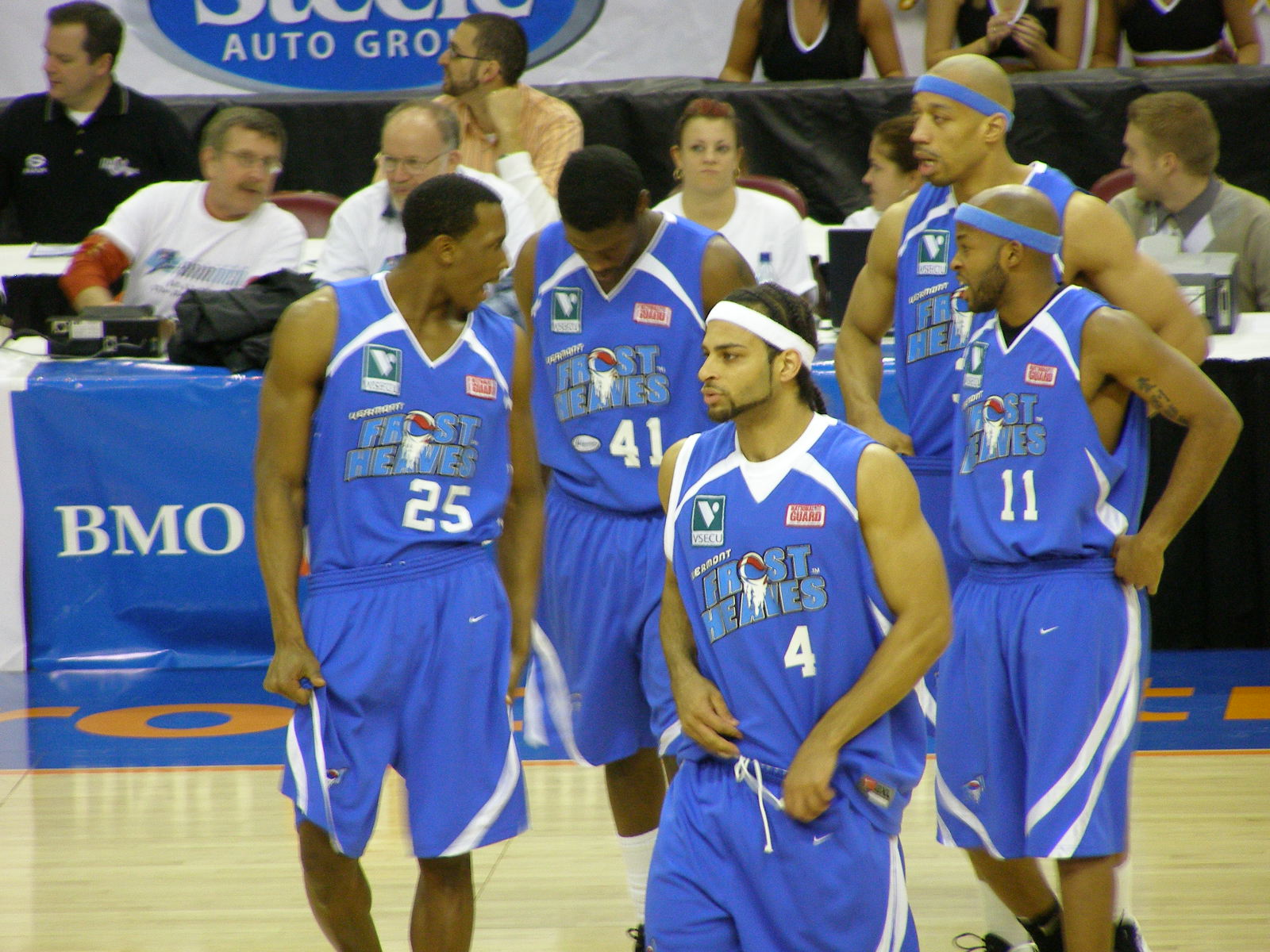
Vermont Frost Heaves, winners of the 2006–07 and 2007–08 league championship.

97 teams completed at least one game during the 2026–27 season. The league's oldest surviving franchises include the Steel City Yellow Jackets (est. 2014), Indiana Lyons (est. 2017), and Buffalo eXtreme (est. 2022). Nevada teams include the Las Vegas Royals and the new Henderson Gamblers. ABA teams, for the 2026 season, include;

- Central Blue Division: Hoosier State Instigators, Indiana Legends, Indiana Lyons, Indiana Shuckers, Naptown Pirates, Steel City Yellow Jackets
- Central Red Division: Knoxville Commerce, Louisville Pros, Middletown Maulers, Nashville Aces
- Central Black Division: Chicago Fury, Chicago Rebels, Southland Saints, Windy City Inferno
- Central White Division: 402 Elite, Missouri Capitals, North Tulsa Natives, River City Gamblers, St. Louis Spirites
- East Blue Division: Bennington Martens, Boston Sharks, Burlington Revolution, New England Lightning, NH Kings, *Saratoga Racers, *Southcoast Fire, Vermont Coyotes
- East White Division: Binghamton Bulldogs, Buffalo eXtreme, Central Pennsylvania Kings, Herkimer Originals, Philly Thunder, Philly Uptown Ballers, Rochester Reapers, Syracuse Monarchs, *Wyoming Valley Clutch, *York City Raptors
- East Black Division: Bridgeport Kings, Burlington Thorobreds, Connecticut Apex, Delaware Dawgs, Hartford Colts, Hudson Valley Rivermen, *Maryland Bulldogz, *Middle Penn Spartans, New Jersey Soldiers, New York Wolverines, Waterbury Sharks
- East Red Division: Carolina Kings, DC Crank, DC Senate, Edgewood 96ers (SC), High Point Pistons, Lion Nation, *Little Chicago Basketball, Petersburg Live Wire, Prince George's Valor, Raleigh Legends, Reidsville Reapers, Roanoke Rapids Pirates, SBC Elite Sports (or Ballers)
- South Black Division: Circle City Pythons, *Gulf Coast Gladiators, Gulfport Kings, Lafayette Ballers, Mississippi Silverbacks, MS Delta Lucky Ducks, Natchitoches Hustle, North Alabama Wardawgs, River Region Generals
- South Blue Division: *Amarillo Shock, Austin Bats, CTX Chaos, DFW Flight, Frisco Blaze, Liberty Hills Disciples, *Lonestar Crusaders, *Lubbock Heat Wave, Midlothian Marshals, Southern Smoke, *Texas Purple Kings, Texas Red Wolves, Texas Seraphim, Wichita Falls Netburners
- South Red Division: Albany Team Motion, Atlanta Aliens, Atlanta Defenders, Chattanooga Strike, Columbus Skyhawks, Georgia Magic, Southwest Warriors, *Stonecrest Strong Steppers
- South White Division: *Bold City Rattlers, *Brevard Aces, Central Florida Snipers, Clay County Storms, Florida Tropics, Hawthorne Hurricane, Lakeland-Polk County Royals, *Miami Waves, North FL Raiders, St. Augustine Glory, Tallahassee Musketters
- West Alpha Division A: Arizona Fire, Arizona Gila Monsters, AZ Golden Gators, Greater Rio Rancho Roadrunners, Las Vegas Royals, Las Vegas Scorpions, Navajo Nation Monster Slayers, Phoenix Nomads, Tucson Buckets, *Rio Rico Lobos
- West Alpha Division B: Antelope Valley Bulls, Inland Empire Dawgs, LA Kings, Novastars of Southern CA, San Diego MOB, San Diego Suns, *Guy Levy Legends)
- West Beta Division A: Imago Dei, San Jose Knights, San Jose Wolfpack, *Idaho Outlaws
- West Beta Division B: California Golden Tigers, Contra Costa County Delta Stars, Silicon Valley Panthers, *Salt Lake Dream
- Teams At Large: ABA Nationals (possibly Mexico team), PLAYOFF (possibly Puerto Rico team), Shizuoka Gymrats

*Teams that are listed in ABA teams but not in standings

=== Defunct ===
Franchises that left the ABA but still compete elsewhere include the Detroit Panthers (Maximum Basketball League), Motor City Cruise (NBA G League), Newfoundland Rogues (The Basketball League), and San Diego Surf (United States Basketball League).

== Championship results ==
=== Finals ===
Year	Champion	Runner-up	Result	Host arena	Host city	Game MVP	Ref
2000–01	Detroit Dogs	Chicago Skyliners	107–91	Cox Pavilion	Paradise, Nevada	Gee Gervin / Ndongo N'Diaye	
2001–02	Kansas City Knights	Southern California Surf	118–113	Kemper Arena	Kansas City, Missouri	Pete Mickeal	
2002–03	Not held due to league shutdown.						
2003–04	Long Beach Jam	Kansas City Knights	126–123	Walter Pyramid	Long Beach, California		
2004–05	Arkansas RimRockers	Bellevue Blackhawks	118–103	Alltel Arena	North Little Rock, Arkansas	Kareem Reid	
2005–06	Rochester Razorsharks	SoCal Legends	117–114	Blue Cross Arena	Rochester, New York	Chris Carrawell	
2006–07	Vermont Frost Heaves	Texas Tycoons	143–95	Barre Auditorium	Barre, Vermont		
2007–08	Vermont Frost Heaves	San Diego Wildcats	87–84	Pavillon de la Jeunesse	Quebec City, Quebec, Canada	Dwuan Rice	
2008–09	Kentucky Bisons	Maywood Buzz	127–120	Nashville Municipal Auditorium	Nashville, Tennessee	Michael James	
2009–10	Southeast Texas Mavericks	Kentucky Bisons	96–99, 104–83, 85–76	Parker Multipurpose Center	Port Arthur, Texas	Josh Pace	
2010–11	Southeast Texas Mavericks	Gulf Coast Flash	114–97, 109–85	Nutty Jerry's Entertainment Complex		PJ Couisnard	
2011–12	Jacksonville Giants	South Carolina Warriors	106–101, 100–91	Eckerd College	St. Petersburg, Florida	Jermaine Bell	
2012–13	Jacksonville Giants	North Dallas Vandals	85–84, 110–109	Jacksonville Veterans Memorial Arena	Jacksonville, Florida	Tony Hooper	
2013–14	Shreveport-Bossier Mavericks	Jacksonville Giants	136–127, 105–103	Hirsch Memorial Coliseum	Shreveport, Louisiana	Ed Horton	
2014–15	Shreveport-Bossier Mavericks	Miami Midnites	109–81, 116–91	Hirsch Memorial Coliseum	Shreveport, Louisiana	PJ Couisnard	
2015–16	Jacksonville Giants	Windy City Groove	92–80, 93–90	Laredo Energy Arena	Laredo, Texas	Maurice Mickens	
2016–17	Jacksonville Giants	Windy City Groove	120–102	Woodlawn High School	Baltimore, Maryland	Maurice Mickens	
2017–18	Jacksonville Giants	Austin Bats	119–114	Lehman High School	Kyle, Texas	Bernard Nugent	
2018–19	Jacksonville Giants	South Florida Gold	116–112	St. Louis College of Pharmacy Gymnasium	St. Louis, Missouri	Maurice Mickens	
2019–20	Not held due to COVID-19 pandemic.						
2020–21	Jacksonville Giants	Chicago Fury	111–108	James J. Eagan Center	Florissant, Missouri	Miguel Paul	
2021–22	Steel City Yellow Jackets	Team Trouble	123–118	St. Frances Academy	Baltimore, Maryland	Stephen Vorum	
2022–23	Not held due to unplayable conditions. Burning River Buckets and Indiana Lyons declared co-champions.						
2023–24	Chicago Fury	Mississippi Silverbacks	126–123 (OT)	Spring Hill College	Mobile, Alabama	Khapri Alston	
2024–25	Chicago Fury	Silicon Valley Panthers	131–122	St. Louis Community College–Forest Park	St. Louis, Missouri	Jordan Booker	
2025–26	Austin Bats	Buffalo eXtreme	112–105	Paradise Church of God in Christ Gymnasium	Forest Park, Georgia	Ja'Michael Brown	

=== Performance by club ===
Team	Championships	Winning seasons
Jacksonville Giants	7	2011–12, 2012–13, 2015–16, 2016–17, 2017–18, 2018–19, 2020–21
Southeast Texas Mavericks/ Shreveport-Bossier Mavericks	4	2009–10, 2010–11, 2013–14, 2014–15
Vermont Frost Heaves	2	2006–07, 2007–08
Chicago Fury	2	2023–24, 2024–25
Detroit Dogs	1	2000–01
Kansas City Knights	1	2001–02
Long Beach Jam	1	2003–04
Arkansas RimRockers	1	2004–05
Rochester Razorsharks	1	2005–06
Kentucky Bisons	1	2008–09
Steel City Yellow Jackets	1	2021–22
Burning River Buckets	1	2022–23 (co-champions)
Indiana Lyons	1	2022–23 (co-champions)

== All-Star Game results ==
East (6 wins)	West (4 wins)	South (2 wins)	Team Presley (2 wins)	Kansas City Knights (1 win)	Team Dr. J (1 win)

Year	Result	Host arena	Host city	Game MVP	Ref
2001	Not held.				
2002	Kansas City Knights 161, ABA All-Stars 138	Kemper Arena	Kansas City, Missouri	Maurice Carter, Kansas City Knights	
2003	Not held due to league shutdown.				
2004	Not held.				
2005	West 163, East 149	Las Vegas Sports Center	Las Vegas, Nevada	Lou Kelly, Las Vegas Rattlers	
2006	East 129, West 127	BankAtlantic Center	Sunrise, Florida	Armen Gilliam, Pittsburgh Xplosion	
2007	West 138, East 123	Halifax Metro Centre	Halifax, Nova Scotia, Canada	Billy Knight, Atlanta Vision	
2008	East 161, West 140	Barre Auditorium	Barre, Vermont	Anthony Anderson, Manchester Millrats	
2009	West, East	Nashville Municipal Auditorium	Nashville, Tennessee	Keith Simpson, Texas Fuel	
2010	ABA West All-Stars vs. Gilas Pilipinas	Hangar Athletic Xchange	Los Angeles, California		
2011	East 123, West 122	Jacksonville Veterans Memorial Arena	Jacksonville, Florida	Kayode Ayeni, Jersey Express	
2012	Red vs. White vs. Blue (round-robin tournament)	Eckerd College	St. Petersburg, Florida		
2013	East 198, West 141	South Suburban College	South Holland, Illinois	Maurice Mickens, Memphis Bluff City Reign	
2014	No reported result.	Grandview Christian School	Grandview, Missouri		
2015	South 138, North 131	Kroc Center	South Bend, Indiana		
2016	Team Dr. J 140, Team Gervin 139	St. Frances Academy	Baltimore, Maryland	Terry Hosley, DMV Warriors	
2017	South, North	Big Ben's Home Court	Richmond, Virginia	Christopher Cromartie, South Florida Gold	
2018	No reported result.	Giving Heart Community Center	Pittsburgh, Pennsylvania	Antonio Reddic, Steel City Yellow Jackets	
2019	No reported result.	Giving Heart Community Center	Pittsburgh, Pennsylvania		
2020	Not held due to COVID-19 pandemic.				
2021	East 210, West 165	James J. Eagan Center	Florissant, Missouri		
2022	East vs. West				
2023	East 169, West 151	Jefferson College	Hillsboro, Missouri	Dominique Jones, Garden State Warriors	
2024	West 129, East 122	Spring Hill College	Mobile, Alabama	David Jones, St. Louis Spirits	
2025	Team Presley 210, Team Coley 183	St. Louis Community College–Forest Park	St. Louis, Missouri	Rodney Gaston, Windy City Inferno	
2026	Team Presley 153, Team Hampfield 151	Paradise Church of God in Christ Gymnasium	Forest Park, Georgia	Tymir Robinson, Stone Mountain Strong Steppers	

== Notable alumni ==
*	Elected to the Naismith Memorial Basketball Hall of Fame

=== Players by country ===
USA:

- (United States) Jean-Paul Afif
- (United States) Hameed Ali
- (United States) Malik Allen
- (United States) Anthony Anderson
- (United States) Harold Arceneaux
- (United States) Kayode Ayeni
- (United States) Toby Bailey
- (United States) Antwain Barbour
- (United States) Matt Barnes
- (United States) Turner Battle
- (United States) Corey Beck
- (United States) Charlie Bell
- (United States) Benoit Benjamin
- (United States) Corey Benjamin
- (United States) Jason Bennett
- (United States) Travarus Bennett
- (United States) Emmanuel Bibb
- (United States) Jermaine Blackburn
- (United States) Shad Blair
- (United States) David Booth
- (United States) Jeff Boschee
- (United States) Bryan Bracey
- (United States) Nick Bradford
- (United States) Odell Bradley
- (United States) Torraye Braggs
- (United States) Scott Brooks
- (United States) Damone Brown
- (United States) Kezo Brown
- (United States) Quinnel Brown
- (United States) SirValiant Brown
- (United States) Troy Brown
- (United States) Kenny Brunner
- (United States) Antonio Burks
- (United States) Cardell Butler
- (United States) Kevin Butler
- (United States) Geno Carlisle
- (United States) Antoine Carr
- (United States) Aquille Carr
- (United States) Chris Carrawell
- (United States) Zahir Carrington
- (United States) Maurice Carter
- (United States) Parrish Casebier
- (United States) Chris Cayole
- (United States) Cedric Ceballos
- (United States) Amir Celestin
- (United States) Brian Chase
- (United States) Robert Cheeks
- (United States) Eric Chenowith
- (United States) Keith Closs
- (United States) William Coleman
- (United States) DeAngelo Collins
- (United States) Dallas Comegys
- (United States) Dylon Cormier
- (United States) Schea Cotton
- (United States) Modie Cox
- (United States) Joe Cremo
- (United States) Joe Crispin
- (United States) Eric Crookshank
- (United States) Jason Crowe
- (United States) Ramel Curry
- (United States) Glen Dandridge
- (United States) Lloyd Daniels
- (United States) Ben Davis
- (United States) Kelvin Davis
- (United States) Robert Day
- (United States) Todd Day
- (United States) Derrick Dial
- (United States) Byron Dinkins
- (United States) Nate Driggers
- (United States) Dekabriean Eldridge
- (United States) Ed Elisma
- (Puerto Rico) Carlos Escalera
- (United States) Tony Farmer
- (United States) Marcus Feagin
- (United States) Taurian Fontenette
- (United States) Kevin Freeman
- (United States) Jarrid Frye
- (United States) Will Funn
- (United States) Corey Gaines
- (United States) Chris Garner
- (United States) Kenny Gasana
- (United States) Eddie Gill
- (United States) Armen Gilliam
- (United States) Anthony Goldwire
- (United States) Paul Grant
- (United States) Cortez Groves
- (United States) Kyle Gupton
- (United States) Chris Hagan
- (United States) Darrin Hancock
- (United States) Tim Hardaway *
- (United States) Trenton Hassell
- (United States) Juaquin Hawkins
- (United States) Rodney Hawkins
- (United States) Andrew Hayles
- (United States) Esian Henderson
- (United States) Sean Higgins
- (United States) Dametri Hill
- (United States) Jeremiah Hill
- (United States) Rico Hill
- (United States) Chris Hines
- (United States) Randy Holcomb
- (United States) Jerry Holman
- (United States) Shaheen Holloway
- (United States) Derek Hood
- (United States) Jamar Howard
- (United States) Rick Hughes
- (United States) Johnathan Ivy
- (United States) Edward "Cookie" Jarvis
- (United States) Keith Jensen
- (United States) Ashante Johnson
- (United States) DerMarr Johnson
- (United States) Matt Johnson
- (United States) Charles Jones
- (United States) Dominique Jones
- (United States) Dontae' Jones
- (United States) Kenny Jones
- (United States) Reggie Jordan
- (United States) Mark Karcher
- (United States) Jimmy King
- (United States) Julian King
- (United States) Lorenzo King
- (United States) Billy Knight
- (United States) Christian Laettner
- (United States) Trajan Langdon
- (United States) Jack Leasure
- (United States) Tyrone Levett
- (United States) Geno Lewis
- (United States) Steve Logan
- (United States) Justin Love
- (United States) Pierre Sow
- (United States) Sam Mack
- (United States) Gordon Malone
- (United States) Darrick Martin
- (United States) Dan McClintock
- (United States) Jelani McCoy
- (United States) Javon McCrea
- (United States) Jeremy McNeil
- (United States) Pete Mickeal
- (United States) Anthony Miller
- (United States) Oliver Miller
- (United States) Percy Miller
- (United States) Willie Mitchell
- (United States) Jamario Moon
- (United States) Chris Morris
- (United States) Isaiah Morris
- (United States) Lawrence Moten
- (United States) Byron Mouton
- (United States) Eric Murdock
- (United States) Tyrone Nesby
- (United States) Tyler Newton
- (United States) Ed O'Bannon
- (United States) Doug Overton
- (United States) Josh Pace
- (United States) Gerald Paddio
- (United States) Jannero Pargo
- (United States) Royce Parran
- (United States) Anthony Pelle
- (United States) Mike Penberthy
- (United States) Darren Phillip
- (United States) Chris Porter
- (United States) Rashaad Powell
- (United States) James Reaves
- (United States) Khalid Reeves
- (United States) Kareem Reid
- (United States) Eric Riley
- (United States) John Roberson
- (United States) Lawrence Roberts
- (United States) Stanley Roberts
- (United States) Ryan Robertson
- (United States) James Robinson
- (United States) Mike Robinson
- (United States) Dennis Rodman *
- (United States) René Rougeau
- (United States) Trevor Ruffin
- (United States) JaRon Rush
- (United States) Kareem Rush
- (United States) Bryon Russell
- (United States) Mark Sanford
- (United States) Jason Sasser
- (United States) Akeem Scott
- (United States) DeRonn Scott
- (United States) Shea Seals
- (United States) Clayton Shields
- (United States) Paul Shirley
- (United States) Troy Simons
- (United States) Duane Simpkins
- (United States) Lazarus Sims
- (United States) Reggie Slater
- (United States) Doug Smith
- (United States) Eddie Smith
- (United States) Tony Smith
- (United States) Isaac Spencer
- (United States) Curtis Staples
- (United States) Perry Stevenson
- (United States) John Strickland
- (United States) Jayceon Taylor
- (United States) Doug Thomas
- (United States) Jamel Thomas
- (United States) Torey Thomas
- (United States) Scotty Thurman
- (United States) Clay Tucker
- (United States) Joah Tucker
- (United States) Nick VanderLaan
- (United States) David Vanterpool
- (United States) Fred Vinson
- (United States) Jermaine Walker
- (United States) Matt Walsh
- (United States) Rex Walters
- (United States) Jerod Ward
- (United States) Reginald Warren
- (United States) Jameel Watkins
- (United States) Sylvania Watkins
- (United States) C. J. Webster
- (United States) Tony Weeden
- (United States) Dominick Welch
- (United States) Bubba Wells
- (United States) Robert Whaley
- (United States) DeJuan Wheat
- (United States) Tyson Wheeler
- (United States) Davin White
- (United States) Lou White
- (United States) Donald Whiteside
- (United States) Brandon Williams
- (United States) Jason Williams
- (United States) Jerry Williams
- (United States) Larry Williams
- (United States) Richie Williams
- (United States) Tim Winn
- (United States) Terrence Woodyard
- (United States) Damian Woolfolk
- (United States) Metta World Peace
- (United States) Galen Young

Asia:

- (Lebanon) Matt Freije
- (Taiwan) Chen Hsin-an
- (Philippines) Mark Magsumbol
- (China) Sun Mingming
- (Israel) Guy Parselany
- (Israel) Yoav Saffar
- (Iran) Behdad Sami
- (Philippines) Avery Scharer
- (South Korea) Ha Seung-jin
- (South Korea) Lee Seung-jun
- (Japan) Yuta Tabuse
- (China) Sun Yue

Africa:

- (Nigeria) Dokun Akingbade
- (Sudan) Kueth Duany
- (Sudan) Deng Gai
- (Rwanda) Kenny Gasana
- (Morocco) Mohamad Hachad
- (Senegal) Issa Konare
- (Senegal) Pape Sow

Americas:

- (The Bahamas) Anwar Ferguson
- (United States Virgin Islands) Reggie Freeman
- (Haiti) Antoine Joseph
- (Mexico) Horacio Llamas
- (Dominican Republic) Felipe López
- (Haiti) Olden Polynice

Canada

- (Canada) Jermaine Anderson
- (Canada) Manix Auriantal
- (Canada) Kelvin dela Peña
- (Canada) Robbie Sihota
- (Canada) Christian Upshaw
- (Canada) Dwight Walton
- (Canada) Howard Washington

Europe:

- (Georgia (country)) Tyrone Ellis
- (England) Neil Fingleton
- (Romania) Gheorghe Mureșan
- (Poland) Jeff Nordgaard

Oceania:

- (Australia) Ty Harrelson
- (New Zealand) Jeremiah Trueman

=== Coaches ===
USA:

- (United States) Jean-Paul Afif
- (United States) Nate Archibald *
- (United States) Isaac Austin
- (United States) Rod Baker
- (United States) Bill Bayno
- (United States) Chris Beard
- (United States) Scott Brooks
- (United States) Joe Bryant
- (United States) Wallace Bryant
- (United States) Paul Butorac
- (United States) Jason Caffey
- (United States) Don Casey
- (United States) Earl Cureton
- (United States) Darryl Dawkins
- (United States) Terry Dehere
- (United States) Bob Donewald Jr.
- (United States) Acie Earl
- (United States) Corey Gaines
- (United States) Ryan Gallo
- (United States) George Gervin *
- (United States) Greg Graham
- (United States) Gary Grant
- (United States) Litterial Green
- (United States) Ron Greene
- (United States) Tim Hardaway *
- (United States) Antonio Harvey
- (United States) Sean Higgins
- (United States) Bob Hoffman
- (United States) Dennis Hopson
- (United States) Richard Jacob
- (United States) Antoine Joubert
- (United States) Kevin Keathley
- (United States) Bruce Kreutzer
- (United States) Cliff Levingston
- (United States) Freddie Lewis
- (United States) Kyle Macy
- (United States) Sergio McClain
- (United States) Ashley McElhiney
- (United States) Joey Meyer
- (United States) Barry Migliorini
- (United States) DeLisha Milton-Jones
- (United States) Johnny Moore
- (United States) Ron Moore
- (United States) Richard Morton
- (United States) Hernando Planells
- (United States) Kevin Pritchard
- (United States) Jerry Reynolds
- (United States) Trevor Ruffin
- (United States) Twiggy Sanders
- (United States) Kelvin Scarborough
- (United States) Clayton Shields
- (United States) Bob Sundvold
- (United States) Dane Suttle
- (United States) LaSalle Thompson
- (United States) Ray Tolbert
- (United States) Jan van Breda Kolff
- (United States) Will Voigt
- (United States) Tirame Walker
- (United States) Teresa Weatherspoon *
- (United States) Scott Wedman
- (United States) Paul Westhead
- (United States) Kevin Whitted
- (United States) Jerry Williams
- (United States) Kenny Williams
- (United States) Orlando Woolridge
- (United States) Galen Young
- (United States) Patrick Zipfel

Asia:

- (Jordan) Maz Trakh

Africa:

- (Cape Verde) Jeff Xavier

Americas:

- (Haiti) Olden Polynice

=== International players ===
National team	Player	Period	Appearances	Notes
(United States) USA	Christian Laettner	1990-92	37	1992 Olympic winner
(United States) USA	Tim Hardaway	1999-00	18	2000 Olympic winner
(United States) USA	Jimmy King	1998	9	World Cup 1998
(United States) USA	Armen Gilliam	1986	8	
(United States) USA	Antoine Carr	1982	9	
(United States) USA	Charlie Bell	2005	10	
(United States) USA	Blandon Ferguson	2001		AmeriCup 2001
(United States) USA	Reggie Jordan	1993-97		AmeriCup 1993
(United States) USA	Byron Houston	1999	5	
(United States) USA	Jerry Holman	2001		AmeriCup 2001
