= Calgary Crush =

- League: ABA 2012–15
- Founded: 2011
- Folded: 2015
- History: Calgary Crush 2011–15
- Arena: SAIT Polytechnic gymnasium
- Capacity: 1,300
- Location: Calgary, Alberta, Canada
- Team colors: red, white, black
- Head coach: Eddie Richardson
- Ownership: Salman Rashidian

The Calgary Crush were a semi-professional basketball team who were members of the American Basketball Association (ABA) from 2012 to 2015. The Crush played their home games at SAIT Polytechnic.

== History ==
The Crush were the second ABA team based in Calgary following the Calgary Drillers, which only played in the 2004-05 season before folding. Calgary Crush went undefeated in their inaugural ABA season playing in the nine-team Pacific Northwest Division.

The team announced on November 29, 2015 that the club would sit out the 2015–16 ABA season, citing a lack of funding.

== Season-by-season ==
Season	GP	W	L	Playoffs
2012-13	12	12	0	DNP
2013-14	12	8	4	DNQ
2014-15	10	6	4	DNQ
TOTALS	34	26	8	

== Roster ==
As of March 29, 2013

Number	Name	Position	Height	Weight	Hometown
1	Sean Peter	G/F	6'3"	180 lbs.	Bauchi, Nigeria
5	Keenan Milburn	G	6'1"	180 lbs.	Royston, British Columbia
7	Mike Kierstead	G/F	6'4"	220 lbs.	St. John's, Newfoundland and Labrador
9	Joseph Atangana	F	6'5"	220 lbs.	Yaoundé, Cameroon
12	Kelvin dela Peña	G	6'1"	175 lbs.	Makati, Philippines
13	Allen Kadima	G	5'10"	185 lbs.	Kinshasa, DR Congo
23	Jordan Rose	G	6'0"	155 lbs.	Toronto, Ontario
24	Tyler Fidler	F	6'9"	210 lbs.	Calgary, Alberta
31	John Riad	G	6'2"	190 lbs.	Sarnia, Ontario
33	Duncan Milne	F/C	6'9"	240 lbs.	Halifax, Nova Scotia
34	Jermaine Campbell	F	6'6"	225 lbs.	Calgary, Alberta
42	Chris Wright	F/C	6'8"	240 lbs.	Calgary, Alberta
44	Hidesh Bhardwaj	G	6'1"	195 lbs.	Vancouver, British Columbia
53	Kelly Lundgren	F	6'6"	240 lbs.	Calgary, Alberta
