= Burning River Buckets =

Professional basketball team in Willoughby, Ohio

- Sport: Basketball
- Founded: 2021
- Folded: 2024
- League: ABA
- Based in: Willoughby
- Championships: 1 (2023)
- Mascot: Buster the Bucket

The Burning River Buckets were a professional basketball team based in Willoughby, Ohio, from 2021 to 2024. The team was a member of the American Basketball Association.

In their second season, the Burning River Buckets captured the 2023 ABA championship, being declared co-champions with the Indiana Lyons.

== Season-by-season record ==
Season	W	L	Result	Playoffs
2021–22			1st in North Central	Lost quarter-finals (Team Trouble)
2022–23	11	4	1st in North Central	Won quarter-finals 100–92 (Team Trouble); Won semi-finals 103–99 (Suns); ABA Co-Champions
2023–24	6	6	1st in Blue Central	Won division semi-finals 110–99 (Aviators); Won division finals 101–84 (Wizards); Lost region semi-finals 90–117 (Fury)
