= Central Valley Titans =

- Founded: 2010
- League: ABA
- Team history: Mid Valley Titans (2010-11); Central Valley Titans (2011-present)
- Based in: Exeter, California
- Arena: Exeter Union High School
- Colors: Sky blue, black, white
- Owner: Josh England & Dennis Johnson
- Head coach: Jimmy Barnett
- Championships: 0

The Central Valley Titans was a team in the American Basketball Association based in Exeter, California. Established in 2010 as the Mid Valley Titans, the team changed its name to Central Valley for their second season in 2011-12.

Home games were played on the campus of Exeter Union High School.

== Season-by-season results ==
Season	Wins	Losses	Finish	Playoff Wins	Playoff Losses	Playoff Results
2010-11	0	6	8th SoCal	0	0	DNQ
2011-12	5	4	1st Cal/Northwest	0	0	DNQ
2012-13	3	7	3rd Cal/Northwest	0	0	DNQ
2013-14	6	7	2nd NorCal	0	0	DNQ
2014-15	6	3	2nd NorCal	0	0	Unknown
2015-16	0	1	5th Ariz/Cal	0	0	Unknown
All-time	14	24	1 division title	0	0	0 championships
