= South Florida Gold =

American professional basketball team

- Founded: 2013
- League: ABA
- Based in: Palm Beach, Florida
- Arena: Trinty Arena
- Colors: Black, Gold
- Owner: Lori Novak
- Head coach: J.R. Gamble
- Championships: 0
- Cheerleaders: Jr Rush Dance - Cheer Team
- Dancers: Gold Rush Dancers
- Mascot: Miner

The South Florida Gold is a professional minor-league basketball team based in Lake Worth, Florida, that began play in the American Basketball Association in the 2013–2014 season.

The team was found in an audit by the School District of Palm Beach County to have posed as two different charities to get reduced rent for gym rental during the 2013–2014 and 2014–2015 seasons.

As of March 9, 2014, the Gold have appeared on the league's rankings at #3, putting them behind the Jacksonville Giants and the Shreveport-Bossier Mavericks. As of April 11, 2016, the Gold have appeared on the league's rankings at #2. As of April 4, 2017, the Gold has appeared on the league's rankings at #1 for three consecutive weeks and maintained a top-four spot during the season. As of April 8, 2018, the Gold has appeared on the league's rankings at #1 for three consecutive weeks. The South Florida Gold finished 3rd of 120 teams nationwide. The Gold also finished 2nd in a tournament held in Mexico at the launch of ABA Mexico. As of March 4, 2019, the Gold have appeared at #1 for one week, for the final league rankings of the regular season.
