= Birmingham Blitz (basketball) =

Basketball team from Birmingham

- Division: Atlantic South
- League: ABA
- Founded: 2011
- Folded: 2017
- History: Birmingham Blitz; 2011–2017
- Arena: Bill Harris Arena
- Location: Birmingham, Alabama
- Team colors: Grey, Yellow
- Head coach: Paul Smith
- Ownership: Birmingham Blitz LLC

The Birmingham Blitz were a semi-professional basketball team that played in the American Basketball Association (ABA) based in Birmingham, Alabama. Founded in 2011, the team was owned by Birmingham Blitz LLC and in part by professional basketball player Ronald Steele. The Blitz played their home games at Bill Harris Arena. The team played their inaugural game on November 16, 2012 against the Southwest Fellowship Warriors, a substitute team for the Tampa Bay Rain who folded before the season started.

The Blitz are the second ABA franchise to be based in Birmingham. The Birmingham Magicians last played in the league in 2006. An unrelated ABA team based in Birmingham named the Magic City Blitz was formed in 2017.

== See also ==
- Birmingham Sabers
- Birmingham Steel (basketball)
