= San Diego Surf USBL =

Basketball team

San Diego Surf
- Division: Western
- League: ABA; 2009–2024; USBL; 2026–present
- Founded: 2009
- History: San Diego Surf; 2009–2021; Oceanside Surf; 2021–2024; San Diego Surf; 2026–present
- Arena: MiraCosta College
- Location: San Diego, California
- Team colors: dark blue, light blue
- Head coach: Jeff Harper-Harris
- Ownership: David Otto
Home

The San Diego Surf are an American professional basketball team based in San Diego, California, and a member of United States Basketball League (USBL).

== History ==
The Oceanside Surf (formerly known as the San Diego Surf) were a semi-professional basketball team based in Oceanside, California, that competed in the American Basketball Association (ABA). The team began play in 2009. The Surf were previously a member of the ABA's Far West division. The team's home venue was HourGlass Arena at Miramar College in San Diego. In 2022, the team announced a rebrand to the Oceanside Surf. The ABA team folded in 2024 upon the death of its owner Ross Kurland.

Before the formation of the San Diego Surf, the city's ABA team had been the San Diego Wildcats, who stopped playing in 2009. The San Diego Surf was formed and held its first tryouts later that year under head coach Terry Mason, and began playing in late 2009. The team has a rivalry with the San Diego Sol.

=== 2009–10 season ===
The Surf finished their season on a positive note participating in the benefit games for the 80,000 victims of the devastating earthquake in Chengdu, China 2008 against the Beijing Aoshen Olympians in Chengdu, Sichuan, China and the first game of ABA Global's ABA Friendship Games 2010 against the Philippine National Pro Basketball team, Smart Gilas, in San Diego April 2010.

=== 2010–11 season ===
The Surf began their short exhibition season against the Camp Pendleton Marines on October 21 at Hourglass Arena. San Diego won 97–73. They opened up their regular season with a 140–123 win over the San Francisco Rumble, who were ranked #3 in the preseason power rankings.

=== 2019–20 ===
The Surf played 15 games in the season.

== Notable players ==
- Glen Dandridge
- Michael Gomez
