= Shreveport-Bossier Mavericks =

American minor-league basketball team

- League: ABA (2006–07), (2008–11), (2013–15); CBA (2007–08); PBL (2015–2017); TBL (2021–2024)
- Founded: 2006
- Folded: 2024
- History: Rio Grande Valley Silverados; 2006–2008; Southeast Texas Mustangs; 2008–2009; Southeast Texas Mavericks; 2009–2011; Shreveport-Bossier Mavericks; 2013–2015; Kentucky Mavericks; 2015–2017; Shreveport Mavericks; 2021–2023; Shreveport-Bossier Mavericks; 2024
- Arena: Louisiana State University Shreveport
- Location: Shreveport, Louisiana
- Team colors
- Head coach: Steve Tucker
- Ownership: TBA
- Championships: 5 (2010), (2011), (2014), (2015) (2022)
- Division titles: 4 (ABA) 1 (TBL)

The Shreveport-Bossier Mavericks were a professional basketball team based in Shreveport, Louisiana that played in The Basketball League (TBL). The Mavericks folded Thursday, May 23, 2024.

== History ==
=== Rio Grande Valley/Southeast Texas (2006–2011) ===
Originally known as the Rio Grande Valley Silverados, the team was originally a member of the former Continental Basketball Association. Owned by McAllen businessmen Art Gonzalez and Kevin Mitchell, the Silverados were based out of McAllen, Texas and played their home games at the McAllen Convention Center.

In the team's initial ABA season of 2008–09, the team played in Beaumont. The Southeast Texas Mustangs proved to be a force to be reckoned with winning 27 of their first 28 games, many by margins of 50 points or more. Their only loss was a one-point defeat in the final seconds of the game to the Texas Fuel. The Mavericks rose to the top of the ABA Power Rankings early in the season and did not fall from that perch until suffering defeat in the ABA Playoff Semifinals.

On May 14, 2009, owner Jerry Nelson announced the new name and logo. The team name was changed to Southeast Texas Mavericks.

The name had changed, but the game remained much the same for the franchise as the Mavericks consistently remained atop the ABA Power Rankings. On January 25, 2010, the Mavericks set an ABA record for victory margin by beating the New Mexico Rim Rockers 158–72. The margin of 86 points erased the old mark of 81 set by the Kentucky Colonels in the 2004–05 season. In 2010, the team won its first ABA Title.

The Southeast Texas Mavericks were ranked third in the MLN Sports Zone Minor League Pro Basketball Top 10 for January 2010, ahead of teams from the NBA Development League and Premier Basketball League, among others.

After dominating the ABA for three-straight seasons, the owners of the Mavericks decided to leave the ABA and seek a more challenging professional basketball league. The Mavericks contacted the NBA Development League office about possibly buying a franchise and beginning the process of becoming a member.

After numerous meetings with NBA D-League officials, Mavericks’ owner Jerry Nelson accepted the league's "No" response to their request to join the D-League. The team sat out the next two seasons. In 2013, Nelson made the decision to return to the ABA and relocated the team to Shreveport.

=== Shreveport-Bossier (2013–2015) ===
During their time in Shreveport, the Shreveport-Bossier Mavericks compiled a total record of 66–0, including a 50–0 record at Hirsch Memorial Coliseum, the Mavericks home arena. The team won two ABA championships during the 2013–14 season and 2014–15 season.

=== Kentucky (2015–2017) ===
The Mavericks had much success in their time in Shreveport, but in the offseason of 2015, the Mavericks announced that they would be moving, and the city they chose was Owensboro, Kentucky. The Kentucky Mavericks also changed leagues from the ABA to the Premier Basketball League. In their first game in a new league and the new city, the Mavericks took on defending PBL Champions, the Rochester Razorsharks. The Mavericks defeated the Razorsharks handily, winning by a score of 108–88.

In 2017, it was announced that the Mavericks would cease operations.

=== Rebirth (2021–2023) ===
After a six-year absence, a new Shreveport Mavericks joined TBL as an expansion team for the 2021 season with the original name and colors. Former coach, Steve Tucker will serve as the head coach and general manager. On April 5, 2021, the team officially announced its schedule with home games to take place at the LSUS Gym, the Gold Dome and Captain Shreve High School.

=== Shreveport-Bossier (2024–present) ===
Prior to the 2024 season the team underwent an ownership change and reverted back to the Shreveport-Bossier Mavericks. It was also announced the Mavericks home would be Louisiana State University Shreveport.

== ABA/PBL win streak ==
On February 14, 2016, the Mavericks extended their win streak to 103 games, having not lost a game since December 2010. On March 6, 2016, the Mavericks winning streak came to an end, as they were defeated by the Rochester Razorsharks, by a score of 105–99.

== Current roster ==
Shreveport Mavericks roster
Players	Coaches
Pos. / No. / Nat. / Name / Ht. / Wt. / Age; SG / / (United States) / Whitt, Jimmy / 6 ft 3 in (1.91 m) / 175 lb (79 kg) / 29 – 9 January 1997	Head coach: (United States) Steve Tucker; Assistant coach(es): (United States) Kevin Keathley; Legend: (C) Team captain; Injured

== Season-by-season record ==
Season	League	Division/Conference	Finish	Wins	Losses	Pct.	Postseason results
Southeast Texas Mustangs
2008-09	ABA	SW Division	1st	27	2	93.1%	ABA SW Division Champion. Lost in playoff semifinals.
Southeast Texas Mavericks
2009-2010	ABA	SW Division	1st	23	3	88.5%	ABA League Champions
2010-2011	ABA	SW Division	1st	23	1	95.8%	ABA League Champions
Shreveport-Bossier Mavericks
2013-2014	ABA	SW Division	1st	30	0	100%	| ABA League Champions
2014-2015	ABA	SW Division	1st	32	0	100%	| ABA League Champions
Kentucky Mavericks
2015-16	PBL	-	1st	27	2	93.1%	TBD
ABA regular season				135	6		2008–2015
PBL				11	1		2015–2016
Playoffs							2008–present
Totals combined				168	8	95.4%	4 ABA League Championships

== Coaching roster ==
Head Coach	Season
Coach Steve C. Tucker	2007-2008
Coach Steve C. Tucker	2008-2009
Coach Steve C. Tucker	2009-2010
Coach Steve C. Tucker	2010-2011
Coach Steve C. Tucker	2011-2012
Coach Steve C. Tucker	2013-2014 Sarah Gayler
Coach Steve C. Tucker	2014-2015 Sarah Gayler
Coach Steve C. Tucker	2015-2016 Sarah Gayler
Coach Steve C. Tucker	2016-2017 Sarah Gayler Alex Sanders
