= Jersey Express =

American Basketball Association team in Newark, New Jersey

- Founded: 2005; 21 years ago
- Folded: 2025
- League: ABA
- Division: Black
- Region: East
- Team history: Newark Express; 2005–2008; Jersey Express; 2008–2021, 2024–2025; Garden State Warriors; 2021–2024
- Based in: Newark, New Jersey
- Arena: YMCA of Newark
- Colors: Red, black, silver
- Owner: Marsha Blount
- Head coach: Tyrone Pullins
- Website: jerseyexpressaba.com

The Jersey Express were a basketball team based in Newark, New Jersey. The team competed in the American Basketball Association (ABA) as a member of the Black Division of the East Region.

The team was formed in 2005 as the Newark Express, and later became the Garden State Warriors. Marsha Blount, executive vice president of the ABA and CEO of the Women's American Basketball Association (WABA), was owner of the team.

== History ==
Shaheen Holloway playing for the team during their inaugural season in January 2006

The team was co-founded by Marsha Blount and Jacqueline Halyard, playing as the Newark Express at Essex County College. Darryl Dawkins was the team's first head coach for their inaugural 2005–06 ABA season. Former Seton Hall Pirates standout Shaheen Holloway was signed as their star player. The team finished its regular season with a record of 14-16 before falling to the Rochester RazorSharks in the playoffs.

Ron Moore replaced Dawkins as head coach for the 2006–07 ABA season but left shortly into the campaign, leaving Marsha Blount to take over coaching duties herself. Blount's team went 2-21 and failed to make the playoffs. The team rebranded as the Jersey Express for the 2007–08 ABA season and moved their games to Drew University in Madison, New Jersey, but struggled financially as many clubs in the ABA folded mid-season. In the 2008–09 ABA season, the team went 14-8 under new coach Jerry Reynolds before falling in the playoffs to the Nashville Broncs.

The team moved to East Orange Campus High School in East Orange, New Jersey beginning with the 2009–10 ABA season. Assistant coach Quaasim Austin was promoted to head coach beginning with the 2009–10 season, but was replaced mid-campaign by assistant Cassandra Smith. Smith led the 12-4 team to its first division title and a playoff appearance.

After the team went 8-6 during the 2010–11 ABA season and failed to make the playoffs, Terry Dehere was originally announced as head coach for the 2011–12 ABA season before he left due to a dispute with ownership. Assistant coach Joseph Amador took over, leading the team to a 5-7 record at their new home of Jersey City Armory, but was replaced after the 2011–12 season by assistant coach Ray Ortiz. The team then moved to Centenary University in Hackettstown, New Jersey for the 2012–13 ABA season, where the 9-3 team won its third division championship and made the playoffs.

The club returned to Newark for the 2013–14 ABA season, playing its games at Malcolm X Shabazz High School. A fourth division title was captured in 2013–14, with the team going 9-2 and making the playoffs.

Team owner Marsha Blount was named CEO of the Women's American Basketball Association (WABA) in 2017. She also founded a team in that league, the Jersey Expressions, and they captured consecutive WABA championships in 2017 and 2018. Blount was later named executive vice president of the ABA in 2022.

From the 2021–22 ABA season through the 2023–24 ABA season, the team was rebranded as the Garden State Warriors.

The team returned to its Jersey Express moniker for the 2024–25 ABA season under new head coach Tyrone Pullins, where they captured a fifth division championship with a 11-2 record and advanced to the 2025 ABA playoffs.

== See also ==
- Sports in Newark, New Jersey
