= Chicago Steam =

Basketball team of the American Basketball Association

- Founded: 2007
- League: ABA
- Team history: Chicago Steam (2008-Present)
- Based in: South Holland, Illinois
- Arena: South Suburban College
- Colors: Red, yellow, white
- Owner: Ron Hicks
- Head coach: Mitchell Anderson
- Dancers: Chicago Steam Basketball Dance Team

The Chicago Steam is a basketball team of the American Basketball Association. Founded in 2007, the Steam first played in the 2008-09 ABA season. Based in the Chicago suburb of South Holland, Illinois, the Steam plays its home games at South Suburban College.

== History ==
In February 2013, a player for Steam women's team filed a lawsuit against team owner Ron Hicks over taking money for a trip which never occurred then keeping the money. Many other former players made complaints over failure to be paid or paying for trips which never occurred.
