= List of former American Basketball Association (2000–present) teams =

Former teams of the American Basketball Association (2000–present) include the following, reflecting teams that are either defunct or left the ABA for other leagues:

== A ==
- ABA Australia
- ABA Mexico
- Aberdeen Attack
- Alaska 49ers
- Alaska Dream
- Alaska Quake
- Alaska Stars
- Albany Shockwave
- Albany Thunderdawgs
- Albuquerque Aliens
- Alexandria Wind Jammers
- Anaheim Roadrunners
- Anderson Champions
- Aoshen Dragons
- Appalachian Rapids
- Arcata 49ers
- Arizona Beast
- Arizona Rhinos
- Arizona Scorpions
- Arkansas Aeros
- Arkansas Fantastics
- Arkansas RimRockers – joined NBA Development League
- Arkansas Rivercatz
- Arkansas Scorpions
- Atlanta Experience
- Atlanta Mustangs
- Atlanta Vision
- Augusta 706ers
- Austin Boom
- Austin Capitals

== B ==
- Bahama All-Pro Show
- Ball World Peace
- Baltimore Bay Lions → Baltimore Pearls
- Bay Area Matrix
- Baytown Bandits
- Beijing Aoshen Olympians – joined West Coast Pro Basketball League
- Bellevue Blackhawks
- Bellevue Nighthawks
- Bellingham Slam – joined International Basketball League
- Big Valley Shockwave – expansion team that did not begin play in 2006–2007 season
- Birmingham Blitz
- Birmingham Magicians
- Bluegrass Stallions – joined Premier Basketball League
- Bluff City Reign
- Boriquen Puerto Rico
- Boston Blizzard
- Boston Defenders
- Boston Liberators
- Bowling Green Bandits
- Brooklyn Blackout
- Brooklyn Heat
- Brooklyn Skyrockets
- Buckeye Show
- Buffalo 716ers – joined Premier Basketball League
- Buffalo Blue Hawks → Buff City Braves
- Buffalo Rapids → Buffalo Silverbacks → Buffalo Sharks
- Burning River Buckets

== C ==
- Calgary Crush
- Calgary Drillers
- California Eagles
- California Golden Tigers
- California Sea Kings
- California Terminators
- Canada Revolution – never played
- Cape Cod Frenzy
- Carolina Cheetahs
- Carolina Cougars
- Carolina Coyotes
- Carolina Destiny
- Carolina Jaguars
- Carolina Kings
- Carolina Thunder
- Carson Buzz → Maywood Buzz
- Centinelas de Mexicali
- Central Cali Cats
- Central Coast Chaos
- Central Florida Marvel – joined NEBA
- Central Valley Dawgs
- Central Valley Titans
- Charleston Charcoal
- Charleston City Lions
- Charlotte Crossovers
- Charlotte Dynasty
- Charlotte Krunk – joined Continental Basketball Association → Atlanta Krunk, joined Premier Basketball League → Augusta Groove
- Charlotte Rams
- Chattanooga Steamers
- Chi-Town Bulldogs
- Chicago Court Kingz
- Chicago Knights
- Chicago Rockets
- Chicago Rockstars
- Chicago Skyliners → Las Vegas Rattlers
- Chicago Soldiers – joined Independent Basketball Association
- Chicago Stars
- Chicago Steam
- Chicago Throwbacks – joined Premier Basketball League
- Chico Rage
- Cicero Cometas USA
- Cincinnati Blaze
- Cincinnati Monarchs
- Clayton Showtime
- Cleveland Rockers
- College Park Spyders
- Colorado Cougars
- Colorado Gray Wolves
- Colorado Kings
- Colorado Springs Crusaders
- Colorado Storm
- Columbia Axemen
- Columbus Blackhawks
- Columbus Crush
- Columbus Life
- Columbus Riverballers
- Columbus Wolves
- Compton Cobras
- Connecticut Topballerz
- Conway Cyclones
- Corning Bulldogs – joined Eastern Basketball Alliance → Elmira Bulldogs
- Cypress Express

== D ==
- Dallas Generals
- Dallas Impact
- Daytona Beach Sharks
- Delta Storm – joined Elite Basketball League
- Denton Destroyers
- Detroit Coast II Coast All-Stars
- Detroit Dogs → Detroit Wheels → Detroit Panthers, joined Premier Basketball League
- Detroit Hoops
- Detroit Zafir
- DMV Warriors

== E ==
- East Bay Pit Bulls
- East Carolina Trojans
- East Kentucky Energy
- East Kentucky Miners
- East Point Jaguars
- Edmonton Cheetahs
- Electric City Lions → Charleston City Lions
- Erie Elite
- Everett Evolution
- Everett Longshoremen
- Everett Revolution

== F ==
- Fairfield Funky Fresh
- Flint Fire
- Flint-Vehicle City Chargers
- Florida All-Stars
- Florida Makos
- Florida Native Pride
- Florida Pit Bulls – joined Continental Basketball Association → East Kentucky Miners, rejoined ABA
- Florida Thundercats
- Fort Smith Firebirds
- Fort Worth Energy
- Fresno Farmdogs
- Fresno Griffins
- Fresno Heatwave → Sacramento Heatwave → California Heatwave
- Fresno-Washington Raptors

== G ==
- Gallup Talons → Gallup Outlaws
- Garland Hoyas – Joined NEBA
- Gatos del Miami
- Gem City Hall O' Famers
- Georgia Bearcats → Georgia Wildcats
- Georgia Gwizzlies
- Georgia Kingz
- Georgia Knights – joined Universal Basketball Association → Georgia Lions
- Georgia Razors – joined Continental Basketball League
- Georgia Predators
- Georgia Roadrunners
- Georgia-Lina Hurricanes
- Gomez Palacio Thundercats
- Grande Prairie Cowboys
- Grand Rapids Cyclones
- Grand Rapids Danger – joined another league
- Greenville Down East
- Greencastle Golden Knights
- Greenville Galaxy
- Gulf Coast Flash

== H ==
- Halifax Rainmen – joined Premier Basketball League, joined National Basketball League of Canada
- Hamilton Rockstars
- Hammond Rollers
- Hampton Charters
- Hampton Roads Sharks
- Hampton Roads Stallions
- Hampton Roads Titans
- Hampton Street Pros
- Harbor Shore Dreams
- Harlem Revs
- Hartford Hurricanes
- Hattiesburg Hornets
- Hawaii Hammerheads
- Hawaii Hurricanes
- Hawaii Mega Force
- Heartland Heat
- Heartland Prowl – joined Continental Basketball League, joined Florida Basketball Association
- Henderson All-Starz
- Hermosillo Seris
- Hollywood Fame
- Hollywood Magic
- Hollywood Showstoppers
- Honolulu Pegasus → Cypress Pegasus
- Houston Hounddogs
- Houston Undertakers → Houston Takers → Houston Red Storm
- Hub City Warriors

== I ==
- Ill City Beast
- Illinois BallDogz
- Indiana Alley Cats – joined Continental Basketball Association
- Indiana Diesels – joined Premier Basketball League
- Indiana Legends
- Indiana State Warriors
- Indianapolis Drive
- Indy Naptown All-Stars
- Inglewood Cobras
- Inland Empire 5LINX
- Inland Empire Invaders → Yuma Invaders

== J ==
- Jacksonville Bluewaves
- Jacksonville Giants
- Jacksonville Jackals
- Jacksonville JAM – joined Premier Basketball League
- Jacksonville Wave
- Jersey Express
- Jersey Jaguars
- Juarez Gallos

== K ==
- Kalamazoo Pure → Kalamazoo Cobras → Kalamazoo Giant Knights
- Kansas Kagerz
- Kansas City Knights
- Kansas City Soul
- Kansas City Spartans
- Kansas City Stars
- Katy Katz
- KC Clubbin
- Kent Chiefs
- Kentucky Bisons
- Kentucky Enforcers
- Kentucky Mavericks
- Kentucky Pro Cats
- Kentucky Retros
- King County Rampage
- King County Royals
- Kitsap Admirals – became independent team
- Knoxville Colonels
- Knoxville Noise
- Knoxville Warriors

== L ==
- La Crosse Showtime
- Lake Charles Corsairs – expansion team that did not begin play in 2012–2013 season
- Lake Charles Hurricanes – expansion team that did not begin play
- Lake City Kingdom Riders → Gulf Coast Kingdom Riders → Louisiana Kingdom Riders
- Lake Erie Rockers
- Lake Michigan Admirals – joined Premier Basketball League
- Lakewood Panthers
- Lancaster Wolfpack
- Lansing Law
- Lansing Sting
- Laredo Swarm → Am-Mex Swarm → Cen-Tex Swarm
- Las Estrellas de Chicago (Chicago Stars)
- Las Vegas Aces
- Las Vegas Defenders
- Las Vegas Jokers
- Las Vegas Knights
- Las Vegas PROLYMs
- Las Vegas Rattlers
- Las Vegas Wizards
- Libertyville Vipers → Vipers Pro Basketball
- Lima Explosion – joined Premier Basketball League → Lima Express
- Lincoln Thunder
- Little Italy Buffaloes
- Little Rock Lightning
- LI Whoshoseballers
- Long Beach Breakers
- Long Beach Jam – joined NBA Development League → Bakersfield Jam → Northern Arizona Suns → Motor City Cruise
- Long Beach Laguneros
- Long Island Sounders
- Los Angeles Aftershock
- Los Angeles Palms
- Los Angeles Push
- Los Angeles Slam
- Los Angeles Slam of Antelope Valley
- Los Angeles Stars
- Los Borregos Tecate
- Los Diablos Tijuana
- Louisiana Cajun All Stars
- Louisiana Cajun Pelicans
- Louisiana Gators
- Louisiana Kingdom Riders
- Louisiana Soul – joined Universal Basketball Association
- Louisiana United

== M ==
- Manchester Millrats – joined Premier Basketball League, joined National Basketball League of Canada → Saint John Mill Rats
- Maryland Marvels – joined Eastern Basketball Alliance
- Maryland Nighthawks – joined Premier Basketball League, joined Atlantic Coast Professional Basketball League → Washington GreenHawks
- Mayas-USA
- Memphis Dons
- Memphis Houn'Dawgs
- Metroplex Lightning
- Miami Flame
- Miami Midnites
- Miami Storm
- Miami Tropics
- Michiana Ballaholix
- Mid-South Echoes
- Midwest Flames
- Milwaukee Blast
- Milwaukee RimRattlers
- Minnesota Blizzards
- Minnesota Rattlers
- Minnesota Ripknees
- Minnesota Slamma Jamma
- Minot City Freeze
- Mississippi Blues
- Mississippi Miracles
- Missouri Rhythm → Kansas City Soul
- Mobile Bay Hurricanes
- Mobile Bay Tornados
- Modesto Bearcats
- Modesto Hawks
- Monroe Magicians
- Montreal Matrix
- Motown Jammers

== N ==
- Nashville Broncs → Music City Stars
- Nashville Nighthawks
- Nashville Rhythm
- Nashville Soul
- Native America
- Native Pride
- NEA Swag
- Nevada Senators
- New England Anchors → Providence Anchors
- New England Outtatowners
- New Mexico Style
- New Orleans Blues/Louisiana Blues – expansion team that did not begin play in 2006–2007 season
- New Orleans Cougars
- New York Court Kings – joined The Basketball League → joined Maximum Basketball League
- New York Jamm
- New York Lightning
- New York Pharoahs
- New York Red Riders
- New York State Jaguars
- Niagara Daredevils
- NorCal Bears
- Norfolk Ballerz
- Norfolk Navigators
- Norfolk Sharks
- North Carolina Renegades
- North Dallas Vandals
- North Shore Tides
- North Texas Fresh – joined Universal Basketball Association
- Northeast Pennsylvania Breakers – joined United States Basketball League
- Northern Indiana Monarchs → Michiana Monarchs → King City Monarchs → Southern Illinois Monarchs
- Northwestern Indiana Magical Stars – joined Premier Basketball League → Northwest Indiana Stars
- NoVA Wonders
- NYC Internationalz
- NYC Thunder

== O ==
- Oakland Bayhawks → Oakland TownHawks
- Oceanside A-Team
- Ohio Aviators
- Oklahoma Cavalry - joined Continental Basketball Association → Lawton-Fort Sill Cavalry, joined Premier Basketball League
- Oklahoma City Ballhawgs → Louisiana Cajun Pelicans
- Oklahoma Stallions
- Olympia Rise
- Ontario Red Wolves
- Ontario Warriors
- Orange County Buzz
- Orange County Crush → Orange County Buzz → Carson Buzz → Maywood Buzz
- Orange County Gladiators
- Orlando Kings
- Orlando Waves
- Outtatowners of New York City
- Owensboro Colonels

== P ==
- Pacific Rim Rockers
- Palm Beach Imperials
- Palmetto State Rizers
- Panama City Dream
- Pee Dee Pride
- Pensacola Aviators
- Peoria Kings
- Peoria Pride
- Permian Basin Obvious Culture
- Philadelphia Cannon
- Philadelphia Colonials
- Philadelphia Fusion
- Philadelphia Sounds
- Philadelphia Spirit
- Phoenix City Bombers
- Phoenix Eclipse
- Phoenix Fury
- Pittsburgh Hardhats → Pittsburgh Xplosion – joined Continental Basketball Association
- Pittsburgh Patriots
- Pittsburgh Phantoms
- Plano Mighty Kings
- Polk County Flame
- Port City Pirates
- Port City Tornadoes
- Porter County Punishers → Indiana State Warriors
- Portsmouth Cavaliers – joined American Professional Basketball League
- Portland Reign
- Pottstown Flames
- Pennsylvania Pride
- Pennsylvania Starz
- Pro Elite Flyers
- Providence Pirates
- Providence Sky Chiefs → Providence Anchors – joined Premier Basketball League
- Puro Money

== Q ==
- Quad City Riverhawks – joined Premier Basketball League
- Quebec Kebs – joined Premier Basketball League, joined National Basketball League of Canada → Laval Kebs
- Queens Kings

== R ==
- Raleigh Renegades
- Reading Railers – joined Premier Basketball League, folded
- Reading Wizards
- Reigning Knights of Georgia
- Reno Rockers
- Reno Sharpshooters
- Richmond Generals
- Richmond Rockets
- Rio Grande Valley Silverados → Southeast Texas Mavericks → Shreveport-Bossier Mavericks
- Riverside Rainmakers
- Riverside Rage
- Rochester Fire
- Rochester Ravens → Roc City Ravens
- Rochester Kingz – joined The Basketball League
- Rochester Razorsharks – joined Premier Basketball League
- Rockford Riverdawgs – joined Independent Basketball Association
- Rock River Fury – joined Premier Basketball League → Rockford Fury
- Rocky Mountain Stampede
- Rome Legions
- Roswell Grays

== S ==
- Sacramento KnightCats
- Salem Sabres
- Salem Storm
- Salina Saints
- Salt Lake City Saints
- Salt Lake Dream
- San Antonio Stallions
- San Diego B-Kings
- San Diego Guardians - joined another league
- San Diego Sol
- San Diego Surf → Oceanside Surf
- San Diego Wildcats
- San Diego Wildfire
- San Francisco Pilots
- San Francisco Rumble
- San Jose SkyRockets – joined Continental Basketball Association → Minot SkyRockets
- Schertz Kings – joined NEBA
- Scranton Shamrock
- Seattle Zhen Gan
- Shreveport-Bossier Flight
- Shreveport-Bossier Mavericks – joined Premier Basketball League → Kentucky Mavericks
- Silver Springs Barracudas
- Sioux City Hornets
- Smoky Mountain Jam
- SoCal Legends – joined Continental Basketball Association
- SoCal Surf
- Sonora Mexicanos
- South Carolina Warriors
- South Jersey Knights
- South Houston Assault
- South Texas Showboats → Texas Fuel
- South Texas Stingrays
- South Valley Fever
- Southcoast Fire
- Southern Alabama Bounce
- Southern California Surf
- Southern Kansas Thunder
- Southwest Florida Spartans
- Spokane Sunz
- Springfield Sting → Western Mass Zombies
- St. Louis Flight
- St. Louis Rotweilers
- St. Louis Stunners
- Stanislaus County Super Kats
- Staten Island Vipers
- Strong Island Sound
- Sugar Land Legends
- Syracuse Raging Bullz → Rochester Raging Bullz
- Syracuse Shockwave
- Syracuse Upstate Trojans

== T ==
- Tacoma Navigators
- Tacoma Rise → Olympia Rise
- Tampa Bay Rain
- Tampa Bay Sharks
- Tampa Bay Strong Dogs
- Tampa Bay ThunderDawgs
- Tampa Bay Tornadoes
- Team Haiti
- Team Nicaragua
- Tennessee Halo's
- Tennessee Mad Hatters
- Tennessee Mud Frogs
- Texarkana Panthers
- Texas Cagerz
- Texas Cardinals
- Texas City Rangers
- Texas Fuel
- Texas Hurricanes
- Texas Red Wolves
- Texas Skyriders
- Texas Tycoons
- The City Jazz
- Dragones de Tijuana (Tijuana Dragons)
- Toledo Royal Knights
- Topeka Aviators → Topeka Steel → Kansas City Steel
- Trenton Cagers
- Tri-City Racers
- Tri-City Suns
- Tucson Buckets
- Tulsa Twisters
- Turley 66ers
- Twin City Ballers

== U ==
- Universal City Seraphim
- Utah Avalanche
- Utah Snowbears
- Utah Stars

== V ==
- Valdosta Warriors
- Valley Legends
- Vancouver Balloholics – became independent
- Vancouver Dragons – joined MLBA, Rejoined ABA in 2019 but folded after 2019 season.
- Vancouver Explorers – never played
- Vehicle City Chargers
- Veneno de Monterrey
- Vermont Frost Heaves – joined Premier Basketball League

== W ==
- Waco Wranglers – joined United Basketball League → Texas Wranglers
- Washington Internationals
- Washington Rampage
- Washington Raptors
- Washington (NJ) Senators
- Washington Swarm
- Weirton Widowmakers
- West Chicago Wind
- West Texas Whirlwinds
- West Virginia Blazers
- West Virginia Outlaws
- West Virginia Wild
- West Virginia Wildcatz → Twin City Jazz
- Westchester Phantoms
- Westchester Wildcats
- Western New York Thundersnow
- Wichita Falls
- William Tucker University Freedom Eagles
- Wilmington Sea Dawgs – joined Premier Basketball League, joined Continental Basketball League, joined Tobacco Road Basketball League
- Wind River Bison → Siouxland Bison
- Windy City Monsters – joined Independent Basketball Association → Windy City Blazers
- Winston-Salem Storm
- Wolverton Wolves
- Worcester 78s
- Wyoming Roughnecks

== Y ==
- Yakima Vipers
- Youngstown Swish
- Yuba City Gold Miners
- Yuma Invaders
