= 2006–07 ABA season =

- League: American Basketball Association
- Sport: Basketball
- Duration: November 2006 – March 2007

Regular season
- Season MVP: James Marrow

2007 ABA Playoffs
- champions: Vermont Frost Heaves
- runners-up: Wilmington Sea Dawgs
- champions: Texas Tycoons
- runners-up: Beijing Aoshen Olympian

2007 ABA Championship
- Champions: Vermont Frost Heaves
- Runners-up: Texas Tycoons

ABA seasons
- ← 2005–06 2007–08 →

The 2006–07 ABA season was the sixth season of the American Basketball Association that lasted from November 2007 and ended with the championship game in March 2008 between the Vermont Frost Heaves and the Texas Tycoons.

The season ended with the Frost Heaves winning their first ABA championship, 143–95 over the Texas Tycoons.

Many teams did not complete their schedule due to travel problems, costs, etc. and or bad weather. Instead of postponing these games, the squads were forced to forfeit, pushing a few teams, like the defending champion Rochester Razorsharks, to leave the ABA by the end of the season.

== Regular season standings ==
Red Conference
North Division	W	L	Win %
Bellingham Slam	21	10	.677
Sacramento Heatwave	11	9	.550
King County Royals	6	9	.400
South Division	W	L	Win %
Beijing Aoshen Olympian	21	9	.700
San Diego Wildcats	15	9	.625
Hollywood Fame	14	11	.560
Gallup Outlaws	9	9	.500
Maywood Buzz	12	15	.444
Dragones de Tijuana	5	14	.263
White Conference
North Division	W	L	Win %
Detroit Panthers	16	10	.615
Sauk Valley Rollers	13	14	.481
Twin City Ballers	6	19	.240
Central Division	W	L	Win %
Quad City Riverhawks	22	7	.759
Minnesota Ripknees	21	8	.724
Peoria Kings	15	15	.500
St. Louis Stunners	8	17	.320
Aurora Force	0	1	.000
South Division	W	L	Win %
Arkansas Aeros	23	2	.920
Texas Tycoons	21	5	.808
Veneno de Monterrey	12	12	.500
Waco Wranglers	7	17	.292
Houston Takers	4	16	.200
Blue Conference
North Division	W	L	Win %
Vermont Frost Heaves	27	5	.844
Rochester Razorsharks	19	6	.760
Quebec City Kebekwa	17	11	.607
Buffalo Silverbacks	14	10	.583
Cape Cod Frenzy	10	18	.357
Montreal Matrix	6	18	.250
Central Division	W	L	Win %
Wilmington Sea Dawgs	15	8	.652
Strong Island Sound	16	11	.593
Maryland Nighthawks	13	16	.448
Brooklyn Comets	7	3	.700
Newark Express	2	21	.087
South Division	W	L	Win %
Mississippi Miracles	17	10	.630
Tennessee Mud Frogs	10	12	.455
Atlanta Vision	9	15	.375
Southern Alabama Bounce	7	22	.241
Knoxville Noise	5	9	.357
Southeast Division	W	L	Win %
Jacksonville JAM	25	8	.758
Palm Beach Imperials	10	16	.385
Orlando Aces	8	17	.320

== Playoff Results ==
Quarterfinals
1	Vermont Frost Heaves	103
13	Strong Island Sound	75
8	Bellingham Slam	137
19	Hollywood Fame	103
5	Arkansas Aeros	forfeit
11	Mississippi Miracles	-
4	Rochester Razorsharks	forfeit
10	Wilmington Sea Dawgs	-
3	Texas Tycoons	-
14	Detroit Panthers	forfeit
6	Minnesota Ripknees	forfeit
9	Quad City Riverhawks	-
7	Beijing Aoshen Olympian	100
15	San Diego Wildcats	97
2	Jacksonville Jam	91
12	Buffalo Silverbacks	100

Semifinals
1	Vermont Frost Heaves	119
8	Bellingham Slam	103
11	Mississippi Miracles	112
10	Wilmington Sea Dawgs	130
3	Texas Tycoons	125
9	Quad City Riverhawks	123
7	Beijing Aoshen Olympian	121
12	Buffalo Silverbacks	106

Finals
1	Vermont Frost Heaves	113
10	Wilmington Sea Dawgs	85
3	Texas Tycoons	126
7	Beijing Aoshen Olympian	114

ABA Championship
1	Vermont Frost Heaves	143
3	Texas Tycoons	95

=== Wild card round ===
- Vermont Frost Heaves (1) received bye to Bracket One Quarterfinal
- Jacksonville Jam (2) received bye to Bracket Two Quarterfinal
- Texas Tycoons (3) received bye to Bracket Two Quarterfinal
- Rochester Razorsharks (4) received bye to Bracket One Quarterfinal
- Arkansas Aeros (5) received bye to Bracket One Quarterfinal
- Minnesota Ripknees (6) received bye to Bracket Two Quarterfinal
- Beijing Aoshen Olympian (7) received bye to Bracket Two Quarterfinal
- Bellingham Slam (8) received bye to Bracket One Quarterfinal
- Quad City Riverhawks (9) defeated Sauk Valley Rollers (17) 100–86
- Wilmington Sea Dawgs (10) defeated Orlando Aces (22) 119–103
- Mississippi Miracles (11) defeated Waco Wranglers (23) 131–119
- Buffalo Silverbacks (12) received bye to Bracket Two Quarterfinal
- Strong Island Sound (13) defeated Quebec City Kebekwa (16) 108–97
- Detroit Panthers (14) defeated Peoria Kings (18) 134–125
- San Diego Wildcats (15) defeated Gallup Outlaws (20) 133–106
- Hollywood Fame (19) defeated Maywood Buzz (21) 143–124
