= History of PBL teams =

This is the year-to-year membership and makeup of the Premier Basketball League, including league divisional alignment and the circumstances of teams no longer in the league.

== Alignments ==
=== 2008 ===
East Division	West Division
Jacksonville JAM/ Jacksonville SLAM	Arkansas Impact
Maryland Nighthawks	Chicago Throwbacks
Reading Railers	Dallas Defenders
Rochester Razorsharks	Quad City Riverhawks
Wilmington Sea Dawgs	Rockford Fury

=== 2009 ===
Atlantic Division	East Division	Midwest Division
Halifax Rainmen	Augusta Groove	Battle Creek Knights
Manchester Millrats	Buffalo Stampede	Chicago Throwbacks
Montreal Sasquatch	Rochester Razorsharks	Detroit Panthers
Quebec Kebs	Wilmington Sea Dawgs	Mid-Michigan Destroyers
Vermont Frost Heaves		

=== 2010 ===
Premier Basketball League
Buffalo Stampede
Halifax Rainmen
Lawton-Fort Sill Cavalry
Saint John Mill Rats
Maryland GreenHawks
Puerto Rico Capitanes
Quebec Kebs
Rochester Razorsharks
Vermont Frost Heaves

=== 2011 ===
East Division	West Division
Halifax Rainmen	Bluegrass Stallions
Quebec Kebs	Dayton Air Strikers
Saint John Mill Rats	Lawton-Fort Sill Cavalry
Vermont Frost Heaves*	Rochester Razorsharks

*The Frost Heaves folded partway through the 2011 season.

=== 2012 ===
Eastern Division	Central Division
Charleston Gunners	Central Illinois Drive
Dayton Air Strikers	Chicago Muscle
Lake Michigan Admirals	Indiana Diesels
Rochester Razorsharks	Northwest Indiana Stars
Scranton/Wilkes- Barre Steamers	Sauk Valley Predators
	St. Louis Phoenix

== Defunct Teams/Failed Expansion ==
- Arkansas Impact (2008)
- Augusta Groove (2008–09)
- Bridgeport, Connecticut
- Buffalo Dragons (2008–10) – sold to the management of the Buffalo Sharks of the ABA to form the Buffalo Stampede.
- Chicago Aztecas
- Chicago Throwbacks (2008–09)
- Dallas Defenders (2008) – ownership revoked mid-season, replaced by league-run replacement, folded when no outside owner could be found
- Detroit Panthers (2008–09)
- Jacksonville JAM – expelled by league
- Jacksonville SLAM (2008) – league-run replacement for JAM; folded when no outside owner could be found
- Lawton-Fort Sill Cavalry-(2009–11) left after losing in the controversial 2011 PBL Finals. Suspended operations.
- Mid-Michigan Destroyers (2009)
- Montreal Sasquatch (2009)
- Pee Dee Vipers (2014)
- Philadelphia Flight (2014)
- Quad City Riverhawks (2007–08)
- Reading Railers (2007–08)
- Rockford Fury (2007–08) – folded when the PBL instituted a "one team per owner" rule
- Southeast Asian All-Stars – announced by PBL, have not been heard from since and not on official website's team roster.
- Toronto Lazers – PBL announced a Toronto expansion team but the team did not join the league for the 2009 season. No update from the league on their status.
- Vermont Frost Heaves (2009–11) – folded from lack of funds.

== Teams that left the PBL for another league ==
- Battle Creek Knights – rejoined International Basketball League
- Bluegrass Stallions- left under unspecified circumstances.
- Buffalo Stampede – removed by the league for failure to adhere to operating standards, joined Atlantic Coast Professional Basketball League
- Capitanes de Arecibo – rejoined Baloncesto Superior Nacional
- Dayton Air Strikers-(2011–12) joined International Basketball League, returned to PBL for 2012 season
- Halifax Rainmen (2009–11) – left after controversial 2011 playoffs for National Basketball League of Canada.
- Lafayette Legends – announced, never played a PBL game. Joined Independent Basketball Association (also never played).
- Maryland GreenHawks (2007–09) – joined Atlantic Coast Professional Basketball League as Washington GreenHawks, folded.
- Minnesota Ripknees (2007) – returned to American Basketball Association, folded shortly afterward.
- Quebec Kebs (2009–11) – left after controversial 2011 playoffs for National Basketball League of Canada
- Racine Storm (2014–16) – played three games in 2016 before leaving PBL; ceasing operations
- Saint John Mill Rats (2009–11) – left after controversial 2011 playoffs for National Basketball League of Canada
