= 2007 ABA All-Star Game =

Exhibition basketball game

West	East
138	123
- Date: January 27-28, 2007
- Venue: Halifax Urban Area, Halifax
- MVP: Billy Knight
- Attendance: 2,500

The 2007 American Basketball Association All-Star Game was held in Halifax, Nova Scotia at the 10,595 seat Halifax Metro Centre from January 27 to 28.

The first event, held on the 27th included a game between St. Francis Xavier University and Dalhousie University, the three point contest (Won by Aaron Cook of the Vermont Frost Heaves), the slam dunk contest (Won by Donald Beachem of the Texas Tycoons), the awards ceremony, and a small performance by Hedley and Classified to be MC'd by Farley Flex.

The second event on the 28th, included a game between Saint Mary's University and Memorial University, and the All-Star game; East versus West. The West defeated the East 138-123.

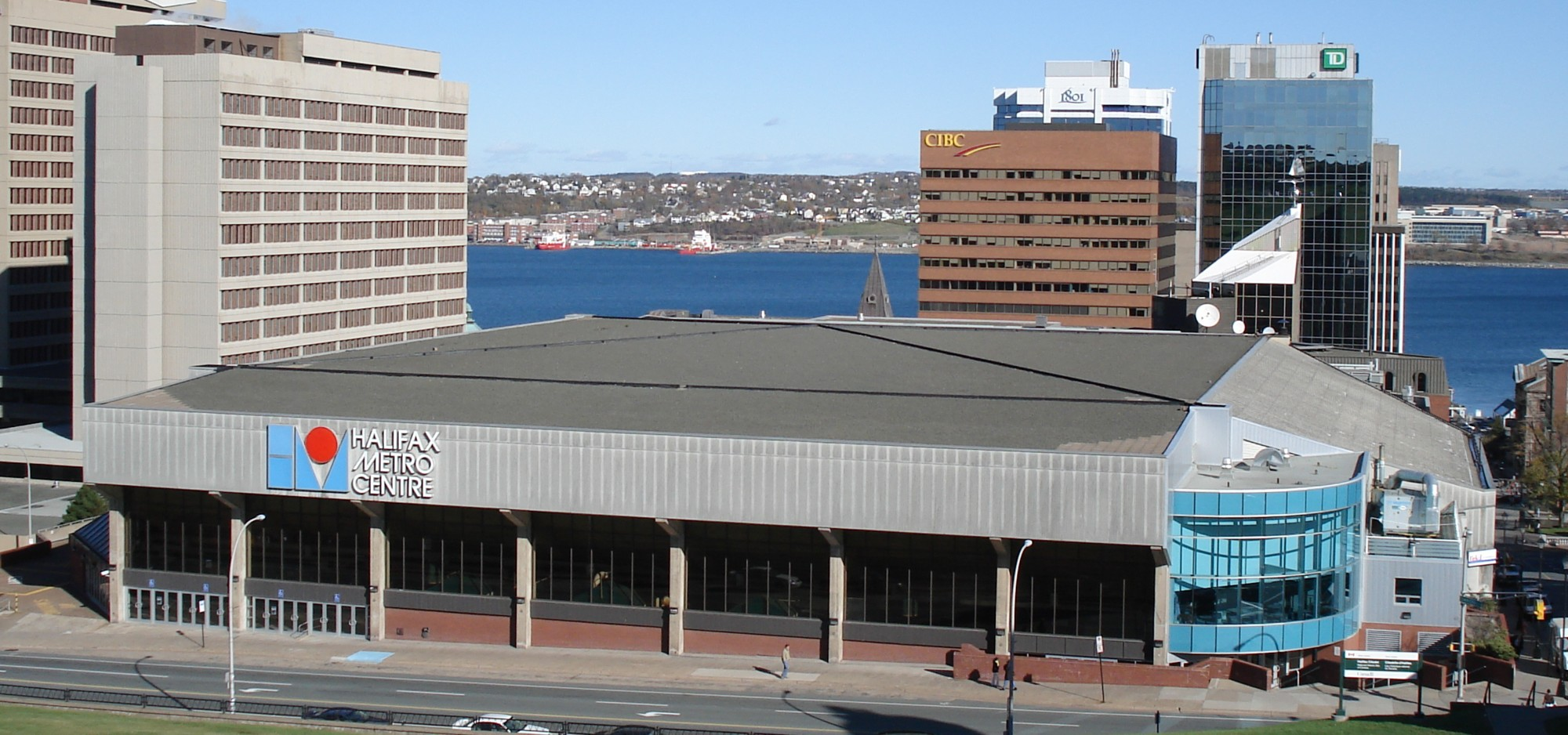
Halifax Metro Centre (now Scotiabank Centre) in 2006.

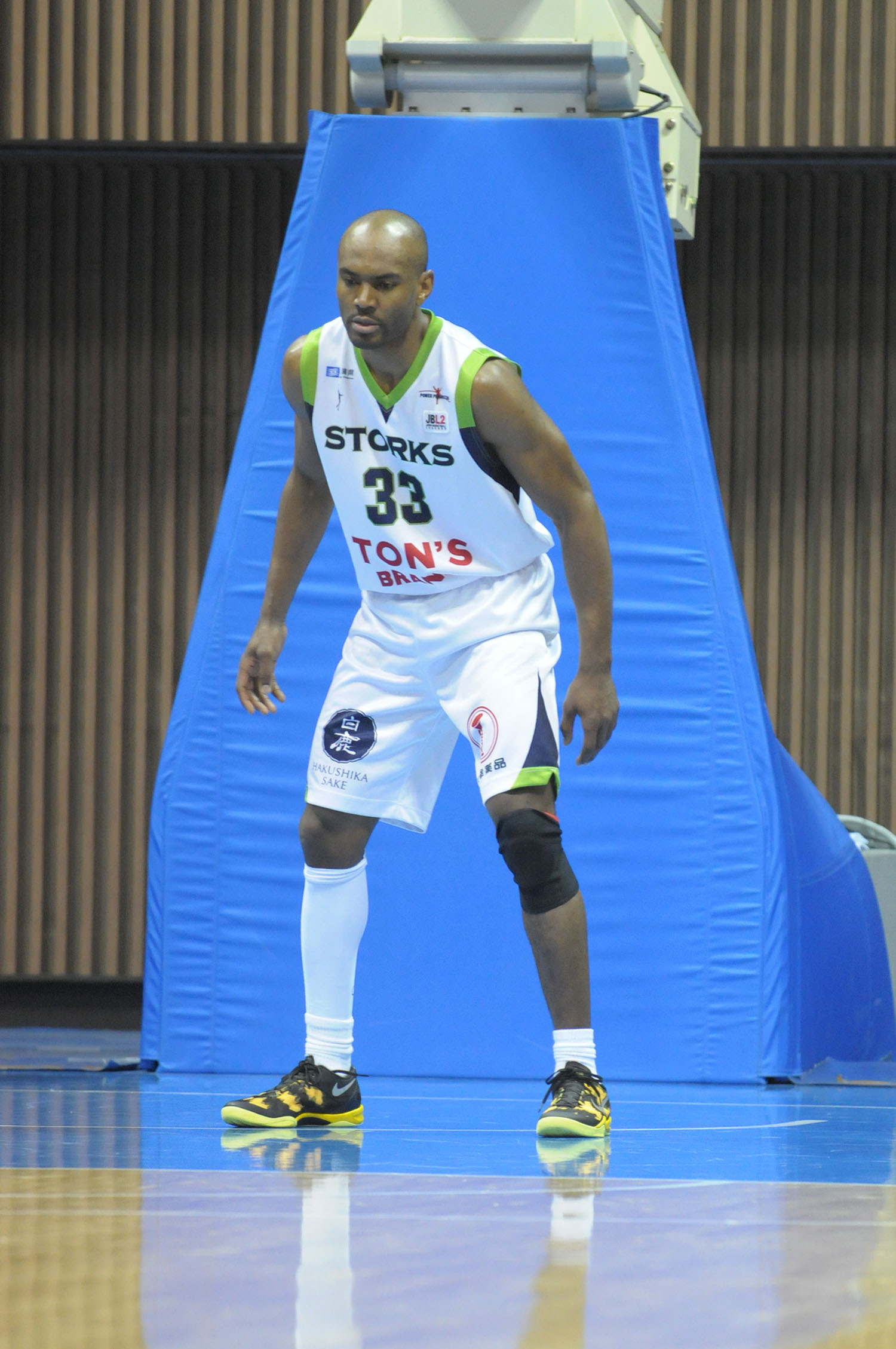
Billy Knight was named the MVP.

== Facts ==
- The Weekend was a success, with an estimated attendance of 2,500 for each event (5,000 total)
- Hundreds of Rainmen T-shirts were handed out. The Rainmen are the local team of the host city, Halifax, and are beginning play next season.
- 213 Shots were taken in the game.
- The All-Star MVP was Billy Knight of The Hollywood Fame. He had 25 points.
- Donald Beachem of the Texas Tycoons had 22 points.
- This year's All-Star Game unlike the previous events, did not feature any former NBA player.
- Hedley performed at the halftime show and spit on Gary Cummings from Mabou.
- Jared Beaton won a tshirt.

== All-Star teams ==
=== Rosters ===
East
Pos.	Player	Team	Previous appearances
Team
G	(United States) Katu Davis	Detroit Panthers	
G	(United States) Antonio Burks	Vermont Frost Heaves	
G	(United States) Aaron Cook	Vermont Frost Heaves	
C	(United States) James "Mook" Reaves	Rochester Razorsharks	
F	(United States) Gregory Plummer	Strong Island Sound	
G	(United States) Drew Washington	Maryland Nighthawks	
G	(United States) Cedric McGinnis	Wilmington Sea Dawgs	
F	(United States) Antoine Sims	Buffalo Silverbacks	
G	(United States) Jerry Williams	Jacksonville Jam	
F	(United States) Rob Sanders	Cape Cod Frenzy	
F	(United States) Bobby St. Preux	Palm Beach Imperials	
G	(Canada) Cordell Jeanty	(Canada) Quebec City Kebekwa	
C	(United States) Alex Hill	Orlando Aces	
F	(United States) Robert Martin	Atlanta Vision	
Head coach: (United States) Will Voight (Vermont Frost Heaves)

American Conference
Pos.	Player	Team	Previous appearances
Team
F	(United States) Mike Parker	Bellingham Slam	
F	(United States) Donald Beachem	Texas Tycoons	
F	(United States) Cardell Butler	San Diego Wildcats	
G	(United States) Billy Knight	The Hollywood Fame	
F	(United States) Bobby Anderson	Peoria Kings	
G	(United States) Terrell Hendricks	Maywood Buzz	
F	(United States) Lonnie Randolph	Quad City Riverhawks	
G	(United States) Curtis Haywood	Arkansas Aeros	
F	(United States) Jeremy Bell	Arkansas Rivercatz	
F	(United States) Jamel Staten	Minnesota Ripknees	
F	(China) Sun Yue	(China) Beijing Aoshen Olympian	
F	(United States) Chris Brown	Tennessee Mud Frogs	
C	(United States) Tyrone Davis	Mississippi Miracles	
Head coach: (United States) Bob Hoffman (Arkansas Aeros)

== See also ==
- 2006 ABA All-Star Game
