= 2008–09 ABA season =

- League: American Basketball Association
- Sport: Basketball
- Duration: November 2008 – March 2009

Regular season
- Season MVP: DeRon Rutledge, Southeast Texas Mustangs; Co-MVP Boris Siakom, Kentucky Bisons

2009 ABA Playoffs
- champions: Maywood Buzz
- runners-up: Nashville Broncs
- champions: Kentucky Bisons
- runners-up: Southeast Texas Mustangs

2009 ABA Championship
- Champions: Kentucky Bisons
- Runners-up: Maywood Buzz
- Finals MVP: Michael James, Kentucky Bisons

ABA seasons
- ← 2007–08 2009–10 →

The 2008–09 ABA season was the eighth season of the American Basketball Association that lasted from November 2008 and ended with the championship game in March 2009 between the Kentucky Bisons and the Maywood Buzz. The Kentucky Bisons won their first title after defeating the Buzz, 127–120.

The 2008–09 season was scheduled to host over 50 teams, but travelling costs doomed most teams and resulted in many franchises folding.

== Regular season standings ==
The following are the final regular season standings of the 2008–09 season. Some teams folded during the regular season and did not complete all of their scheduled games.

Northeast	W	L	Win %
Cleveland Rockers (ABA)	22	4	0.846
Chicago Steam	14	4	0.778
Jersey Express	13	8	0.619
West Virginia Blazers	11	14	0.440
New York City Internationalz	3	7	0.300
NYC Thunder	1	0	1.000
Aurora Force	1	4	0.200
West Virginia Wild	0	2	0.000
Detroit Hoops	0	6	0.000
Northwest Division	W	L	Win %
Maywood Buzz	18	3	0.857
Beijing Aoshen Olympians	14	6	0.700
Los Angeles Push	7	6	0.538
San Francisco Rumble	7	7	0.500
Salt Lake City Saints	1	0	1.000
Washington Raptors	1	1	0.500
Modesto Bearcats	1	6	0.143
Sacramento Heatwave	0	1	0.000
Southeast Division	W	L	Win %
Kentucky Bisons	13	2	0.867
Kansas City Spartans	7	3	0.700
Nashville Broncs	6	5	0.545
Knoxville Thunderbolts	5	5	0.500
Atlanta Vision	1	5	0.167
Bahama All-Pro Show	0	4	0.000
Georgia Gwizzlies	0	9	0.000
Southwest Division	W	L	Win %
Southeast Texas Mavericks	24	1	0.960
Las Vegas Aces	8	2	0.800
Texas Fuel	8	7	0.533
Houston Takers	7	10	0.412
West Texas Whirlwinds	4	3	0.571
Mississippi Blues	4	8	0.333
Arizona Rhinos	3	5	0.375
Phoenix Fury	2	3	0.400
Texas City Rangers	2	12	0.143
Gallup Talons	0	3	0.000

== Postseason ==
Quarterfinals
1	Southeast Texas Mustangs	121
8	Knoxville Thunderbolts	87
4	Kentucky Bisons	106
5	Beijing Aoshen Olympian	104
3	Nashville Broncs	118
6	Jersey Express	99
2	Maywood Buzz	91
7	Chicago Steam	82

Semifinals
1	Southeast Texas Mustangs	89
4	Kentucky Bisons	107
3	Nashville Broncs	111
2	Maywood Buzz	120

ABA Championship
4	Kentucky Bisons	127
2	Maywood Buzz	120
