= 2007–08 ABA season =

- League: American Basketball Association
- Sport: Basketball
- Duration: November 2007 – March 2008

Regular season

2008 ABA Playoffs
- champions: Vermont Frost Heaves
- runners-up: Texas Tycoons
- champions: San Diego Wildcats
- runners-up: Manchester Millrats

2008 ABA Championship
- Champions: Vermont Frost Heaves
- Runners-up: San Diego Wildcats

ABA seasons
- ← 2006–07 2008–09 →

The 2007–08 ABA season was the seventh season of the American Basketball Association that lasted from November 2008 and ended with the championship game in March 2009 between the Vermont Frost Heaves and the San Diego Wildcats. The Vermont Frost Heaves won their league-best second title after defeating the Wildcats, 87–84.

The 2007–08 season haunted the league, as nearly twenty teams folded in the season's first five weeks, and many remaining at the end of the season, including the champion Frost Heaves, left the league for other existing ones.

== Regular Season Standings ==
These are the final regular season standings, considering many teams folded during the year. (leading to few games being played for some teams)

Blue Conference
| Central Division | W | L | Win % |
|---|---|---|---|
| Manchester Millrats | 27 | 11 | 0.711 |
| Westchester Phantoms | 8 | 6 | 0.571 |
| Boston Blizzard | 8 | 16 | 0.333 |
| North Division | W | L | Win % |
| Jersey Express | 7 | 10 | 0.412 |
| Delaware First State Fusion | 1 | 7 | 0.125 |
| Northeast Division | W | L | Win % |
| Vermont Frost Heaves | 26 | 4 | 0.867 |
| Quebec Kebs | 11 | 16 | 0.407 |
| Montreal Matrix | 8 | 17 | 0.320 |
| Halifax Rainmen | 8 | 18 | 0.308 |
| South Division | W | L | Win % |
| Atlanta Vision | 6 | 2 | 0.750 |
| Bahama All-Pro Show | 1 | 5 | 0.167 |
| Georgia Gwizzlies | 1 | 9 | 0.100 |
Red Conference
| Northwest Division | W | L | Win % |
| Beijing Aoshen Olympians | 19 | 1 | 0.950 |
| San Francisco Rumble | 5 | 10 | 0.333 |
| Maywood Buzz | 3 | 23 | 0.115 |
| South Division | W | L | Win % |
| Texas Tycoons | 10 | 1 | 0.909 |
| West Texas Whirlwinds | 3 | 6 | 0.333 |
| Houston Takers | 3 | 8 | 0.273 |
| Southwest Division | W | L | Win % |
| San Diego Wildcats | 21 | 7 | 0.750 |
| Orange County Gladiators | 14 | 12 | 0.538 |
| Long Beach Breakers | 10 | 7 | 0.588 |

== Postseason ==
Quarterfinals
1 | Vermont Frost Heaves | bye
8 | Long Beach Breakers (ABA) | 115
11 | San Francisco Rumble | 129
4 | Texas Tycoons | bye
6 | Quebec Kebs | bye
2 | Manchester Millrats | bye
9 | Montreal Royal | 118
10 | Jersey Express | 110
3 | San Diego Wildcats | bye
7 | Atlanta Vision | bye

Semifinals
1 | Vermont Frost Heaves | 118
11 | San Francisco Rumble | 93
4 | Texas Tycoons | 122
6 | Quebec Kebs | 120
2 | Manchester Millrats | 146
9 | Montreal Royal | 140
3 | San Diego Wildcats | 145
7 | Atlanta Vision | 99

Finals
1 | Vermont Frost Heaves | 106
4 | Texas Tycoons | 100
2 | Manchester Millrats | 109
3 | San Diego Wildcats | 115

ABA Championship
1 | Vermont Frost Heaves | 87
3 | San Diego Wildcats | 84

=== Wild card round ===
- Vermont Frost Heaves (1) received bye to Bracket One Quarterfinal
- Manchester Millrats (2) received bye to Bracket Two Quarterfinal
- San Diego Wildcats (3) received bye to Bracket Two Quarterfinal
- Texas Tycoons (4) received bye to Bracket One Quarterfinal
- Quebec City Kebekwa (6) received bye to Bracket One Quarterfinal
- Atlanta Vision (7) received bye to Bracket Two Quarterfinal
- Long Beach Breakers (8) defeated Maywood Buzz (12) 120–102
- Montreal Royal (9) received bye to Bracket Two Quarterfinal
- Jersey Express (10) received bye to Bracket Two Quarterfinal
- San Francisco Rumble (11) defeated Orange County Gladiators (5) 132-126
