= Quinnel Brown =

American basketball player (born 1983)

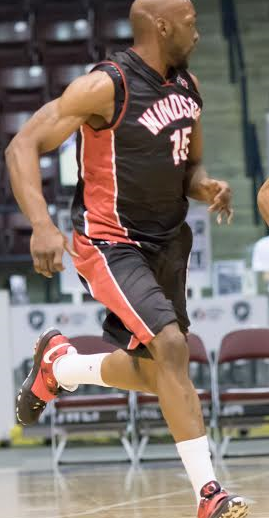
- Brown against the Mississauga Power in 2015

No. 15 – Windsor Express
- Position: Forward
- League: NBL Canada

Personal information
- Born: August 26, 1983 (age 43) Chicago, Illinois, U.S.
- Listed height: 6 ft 6 in (1.98 m)
- Listed weight: 210 lb (95 kg)

Career information
- High school: Morgan Park (Chicago, Illinois)
- College: Wabash Valley (2001–2003); Auburn (2003–2005)
- NBA draft: 2005: undrafted
- Playing career: 2005–present

Career history
- 2005: KTP Palloilijat
- 2005–2006: Sundsvall Dragons
- 2006–2007: Twin City Ballers
- 2007–2008: Detroit Panthers
- 2008: Quad City Riverhawks
- 2008: Gary Steelheads
- 2008–2009: Kataja Basket
- 2010: Fribourg Olympic
- 2010: USA All-Stars
- 2011: Québec Kebs
- 2011: Edmonton Energy
- 2011–2012: Cuxhaven BasCats
- 2012: Québec Kebs
- 2012–2013: Halifax Rainmen
- 2013–2015: Windsor Express
- 2015–2016: Larre Borges
- 2016–2017: Windsor Express
- 2016–2017: Gigantes de Guayana
- 2017–2018: Salta Basket
- 2018–present: Larre Borges

Career highlights
- NBL of Canada All-Time Player List (2022); NBL Canada Most Valuable Player (2015); First-team All-NBL Canada (2015); 2× NBL Canada champion (2014, 2015); All-NBL Canada Honourable Mention (2014); Second-team All-NBL Canada (2013); Swedish League All-Star (2006)

Quinnel Levar Brown (born August 26, 1983) is an American professional basketball player for the Windsor Express of the National Basketball League of Canada (NBL). He primarily plays the forward position, but has been known to even guard small forwards and shooting guards. Brown has experience in multiple minor league basketball leagues in North America and has also competed with several different teams around Europe. He also has played in Uruguay, Venezuela and Argentina.

Brown played multiple seasons in the NBL Canada for the Quebec Kebs, Halifax Rainmen, and Express. In the league, he has earned three All-League selections and the Most Valuable Player Award. Outside Canada, Brown has been named All-Star in the Swedish League and the International Basketball League (IBL).

== High school career ==
Brown played for Morgan Park High School in the Chicago Public League, starring for the team in his senior year as they won the Public League in 2001. The same year, he led the Mustangs to the semifinals of the Illinois High School Association State Championship where they lost to Eddy Curry's Thornwood, with Brown making the All-Tournament team. Brown, rated as the No. 1 unsigned prospect from the state, was also named to the Class AA All-State team by the Illinois Basketball Coaches Association and the All-City team by the Public League coaches' association.

== College career ==
Brown played for Wabash Valley College (Mount Carmel, Illinois) in the Great Rivers Athletic Conference (Region 24) of the National Junior College Athletic Association (NJCAA) Division I from 2001 to 2003. He averaged 10 points and 7 rebounds per game in his freshman season as Wabash finished fourth in the 2002 NJCAA tournament played in Hutchinson, Kansas. As a sophomore, he received All-Conference and All-Regional Tournament honours, averaging 16 points (on 76% FGA) and 8 rebounds per game to help Wabash to a 22–10 record and a Regional runner-up finish, scoring 11 points as they conceded the Region 24 title to Southeastern Illinois.

On April 16, 2003, he signed a letter of intent for Auburn University after visiting their campus the same month, choosing the Tigers over offers from Creighton, Ball State and Arizona State. As a junior, he averaged 7.1 points and 3 rebounds in 22.3 minutes per game as he started 16 of the 28 total games he and Auburn played in the Southeastern Conference (SEC) of the NCAA Division I, with a season-high 20 points in a game against Mississippi State. He was named Outstanding Defensive Player of the year at the team's season-ending awards banquet.

The 6-foot-6 small forward was played as a nominal center during his senior year, starting each of the 31 games played by Auburn, for averages of 12.8 points and a team-high 6 rebounds (eleventh in the SEC) in 31.5 minutes per game. He scored a career-high 23 points during a November 24 game against Nicholls State, posted a double-double of 19 points and a career-high 13 rebounds in a February 12 game against South Carolina, making 7 of his 12 field goal attempts (including both 3-point attempts) and all of his three foul-shots, had 21 points (on perfect 8-for-8 shooting) in addition to 8 rebounds and 2 steals against Arkansas on senior day. Brown scored 13 points before fouling out with five minutes left as Auburn downed Vanderbilt in the first round of the 2005 SEC tournament, however he only had 4 points and rebounds apiece (on 2-for-11 shooting, scoreless in 5 attempts from three) in 22 minutes against LSU the next round as Auburn lost 89–58 to end his college career.

== Professional career ==
Brown started his professional career in Finland, spending the 2005 pre-season with KTP Palloilijat and playing the first game of the Korisliiga on September 30 (for 19 points and 7 rebounds in 37 minutes), however he was released by the side because they were looking for an out-and-out center. He joined Swedish Basketligan side Sundsvall Dragons in October 2005, playing 21 games before a finger injury sidelined him in January 2006. The Dragons were interested in re-signing him for 2006–07 but the deal fell through, he instead joined the ABA's Twin City Ballers in November 2006. He stayed with the side even when they went through financial problems (with player salaries getting slashed to $100 per game) and became a traveling team with Brown performing well in two February 2007 games, however, the team folded soon after and he finished the 2006–07 ABA season with the Detroit Panthers. After averaging 16.3 points, 5.8 rebounds and 2.5 assists per game for the last eight games of the season, he was re-signed by the team in July 2007.

Brown was again announced as a Sundsvall Dragons player in October 2007 but had yet to join the team at that point. He reached an agreement with the club to rescind his contract the same month, without playing a game. On February 4, 2008, he joined the Quad City Riverhawks of the Premier Basketball League (PBL). He helped the side win the PBL's Western Division regular season, and reach the postseason Division title game on March 21 where his 10 points were not enough as the Riverhawks lost to end the season. Also in February, he had been signed by the Gary Steelheads to play the International Basketball League season starting in mid-march. Joining the team after his stint with the Riverhawks, he soon impressed coach Rob Spon who praised his work ethic and versatility. He continued on his good form, making the league All-Star Game and scoring 32 points against the Holland Blast in the last regular season game on June 23, which ended the Steelheads' season as they withdrew from the playoffs for financial reasons.

He played one exhibition game with another IBL side—the Elkhart Express—on August 9, amidst doubts (later confirmed) that the team would not play the next season. On August 26, 2008, Brown returned to the Finnish Korisliiga after signing with Kataja. He averaged 14.0 points and 5.9 rebounds on average over 43 games in 2008–2009.

On January 19, 2010, Brown signed a six-week deal with Benetton Fribourg Olympic of the Swiss Ligue Nationale de Basket (LNBA), temporarily replacing the injured Vladimir Buscaglia. He played only three games with Fribourg, before his contract was cancelled on January 27 by the Swiss in order to recruit Ed Draughan. He played an April 3 IBL game (scoring 22 points) with the USA All-Stars, a team composed of tryout players. In October of the same year, he was announced as likely to play for the Elkhart Express again in exhibition games away to the Chinese national team.

When former Gary Steelheads coach Robert Spon was chosen to coach Canadian PBL outfit Québec Kebs, he brought a number of his former players along with him, including Brown and former teammate Royce Parran to play the 2011 season starting in January. He had an immediate impact, leading the team in scoring (22,3 points per game), rebounding (8.3 pg) and blocks (3 pg), with two nominations for league weekly MVP. This success continued into the season as he was the league's top scorer with more than 21 points per game, he later added the PBL season MVP title, whilst the Kebs' season ended on April 9 following a contentious playoff semifinals defeat to the Rochester Razorsharks. His next stop in early May was with another Canadian side, the IBL's Edmonton Energy. However, he left the team in late May due to what were described as family issues.

In September 2011, the American joined Cuxhaven BasCats to play the 2011–12 German second division 2. Basketball Bundesliga season. He played 18 games for 14.6 points and 5.9 rebounds per game, He suffered a hand injury that sidelined him from January, when it became apparent he wouldn't recover in time to play again for the BasCats he asked to be released from his contract and left the team on February 21, 2012.

Later that month, Brown reunited with the Quebec Kebs, who had in between joined the newly created National Basketball League of Canada (NBL), which was made up of several former PBL teams. He made his league debut on February 23, 2012, in a loss to the Halifax Rainmen, scoring 0 points in just 1 minute of play.

Brown was named NBL Canada Most Valuable Player in 2015 and subsequently won the league championship.

== Personal ==
Quinnel Levar Brown's second name was given to him in reference to actor LeVar Burton, who played Geordi La Forge in Star Trek: The Next Generation, he is nicknamed Q by friends and teammates.
