= Detroit Panthers =

Detroit Panthers may refer to:

- Detroit Panthers (NFL), defunct American football team that played in the National Football League
- Detroit Panthers (PBL), defunct basketball team that played in the Premier Basketball League
