= Rio Grande Rivalry =

Collegiate football rivalry in New Mexico, US

Locations in New Mexico

The Rio Grande Rivalry is the name given to the New Mexico–New Mexico State rivalry and known as the Battle of I-25. It is an intercollegiate rivalry between The University of New Mexico and New Mexico State University. The rivalry began in 1894. In comparison, New Mexico was a United States Territory from September 1850 to January 1912, when it became a member of the United States and the Union.

For many years the rivalry was often referred to as the "Battle of I-25" in recognition of the campuses both being located along the Interstate Highway System.

== Traditions ==
The Thursday evening before that year's rivalry football game, University of New Mexico students and student government annually host a celebration, the Red Rally, in which an effigy of an Aggie is set on fire. The Red Rally was rated on Sports Illustrated, "102 Things You Have to Do Before You Graduate."

Conversely, New Mexico State students set an effigy of a Lobo on fire the week of the game at the parking lot near Aggie Memorial Stadium.

== Sports ==
=== Men's basketball ===
New Mexico–NM State Rivalry (Men's Basketball)
- New Mexico Lobos New Mexico State Aggies
- Sport: Men's basketball
- First meeting: 1894; New Mexico 67, New Mexico A&M 38
- Latest meeting: November 15, 2025; New Mexico State 76, New Mexico 68
- Next meeting: December 5, 2026; Albuquerque, New Mexico
- Stadiums: The Pit; Albuquerque, New Mexico, U.S. Pan American Center; Las Cruces, New Mexico, U.S.
- Trophy: None

Statistics
- Total meetings: 230
- All-time series: New Mexico leads, 125–105
- Current win streak: NMSU, 2 (2024–present)

The men's basketball series between the schools has been more competitive than football, although UNM holds the all-time advantage in that series as well. Currently the Lobos hold a 125–105 advantage all-time over the Aggies. The December 19, 2007 contest was the 200th all-time meeting between the schools.

The UNM–NMSU series is somewhat unusual among non-conference rivalries in that the schools traditionally play a two-game home-and-home series each season (another example of such a rivalry is the Nashville mid-major matchup between Belmont and Lipscomb). Most other rivalries in which the schools are not members of the same conference usually only meet once per season. Although a few individuals have proposed cutting the series back to a more conventional single annual meeting, fan sentiment at both schools remains strong for preserving the traditional two meetings per season format. The meeting between both teams is generally the most anticipated sports game in New Mexico every year, while both teams are able to play at each other's schools.

Since 1949–1950, when both schools were classified as major schools, New Mexico holds a 77–65 advantage over New Mexico State. Recently, both teams have been competitive with each other - in the past ten years (2012-2022), the advantage is 10-8 New Mexico, while both teams went through a total of 7 head coaching changes (New Mexico 4, New Mexico State 3).

==== Memorable games ====
"The Clock Game" – December 17, 1966

- NMSU's "Miracle Midgets" defeated the visiting second ranked Lobos in overtime due to a supposed clock malfunction. Played at Las Cruces High, the Lobos led by two with only 2 seconds left, but on an inbound play, the Lobos were called on a charge. Bob King argued that there would be, "no way to inbound the ball and take two dribbles without time expiring." The Aggies would make both free throws and win the game 62–61.

"The Shot" – December 16, 1995

- After missing two free throws to put the Lobos away, New Mexico's Clayton Shields rebounded the last missed free throw with 2.4 seconds left on the clock. He shot from 3/4 court to beat the Aggies 69–68.

=== Women's basketball ===
The women's basketball series between UNM and NMSU has been defined by extended streaks of dominance by one program over the other. Prior to the mid-1990s the Roadrunners (as NMSU's women's programs were known prior to 2000) were dominant, winning the first meeting by a 57–53 tally on February 1, 1974, and proceeding to win 24 of the first 35 meetings between the schools. Between 1985 and 1995, NMSU ran off a streak of 16 consecutive wins over their in-state rivals. This stretch also covered a two-year period in which UNM did not field a women's basketball team. However, on November 24, 1996, UNM turned the tables on NMSU in a big way. The Lobos' 48–47 win on that day in Las Cruces started a 22-game winning streak by UNM over NMSU that continued unbroken, despite a few close calls, through the 2006–07 season. But on December 2, 2007, the Lady Aggies ended 11 years of frustration against their instate rivals by knocking off the Lady Lobos 58–42 at the Pan Am Center. UNM followed this with an 11-game win streak against the Lady Aggies, until the Lady Aggies beat UNM in 2014. NMSU then went on to win 3 of the next 4, to which UNM has now won 9 straight.

Like the men's teams, the UNM and NMSU women also traditionally play two games per year against each other, one game in each city.

== Yearly champions ==
The Rio Grande Rivalry is a series between New Mexico and New Mexico State. In 15 years of the series, New Mexico has not lost yet to New Mexico State.

| Season Year | Champion | Final score | Total points | Margin of victory |
|---|---|---|---|---|
| 2007–2008 | UNM | 16.25–6.75 | 23 | 9.50 |
| 2008–2009 | UNM | 17.25–6.75 | 24 | 10.50 |
| 2009–2010 | UNM | 16.50–10.50 | 27 | 6.00 |
| 2010–2011 | UNM | 18.75–9.75 | 28.5 | 9.00 |
| 2011–2012 | UNM | 15.00–13.50 | 28.5 | 1.50 |
| 2012–2013 | UNM | 21.00–6.00 | 28 | 15.00 |
| 2013–2014 | UNM | 18.75–3.75 | 22.50 | 15.00 |
| 2014–2015 | UNM | 20.25–5.25 | 25.50 | 15.00 |
| 2015–2016 | UNM | 16.75–9.75 | 26.5 | 7.00 |
| 2016–2017 | UNM | 16.50–9.75 | 26.25 | 6.75 |
| 2017–2018 | UNM | 12.75–11.25 | 24 | 1.50 |
| 2018–2019 | UNM | 19.50–10.50 | 30 | 9.00 |
| 2019–2020* | UNM | 17.50–6.75 | 24.25 | 10.75 |
| 2020–2021* | UNM | 7.50–0.00 | 7.50 | 7.50 |
| 2021–2022 | UNM | 21–4.50 | 25.5 | 16.50 |
| 2022–2023 | UNM | 11.25–9.00 | 20.25 | 2.25 |

*COVID-19 shortened year

=== Scoreboard 2007–2008 ===
| DATE | EVENT | Point | Win | NMSU | UNM |
|---|---|---|---|---|---|
| Sept. 4 | Volleyball | 1.50 | NMSU | 1.50 | 0.00 |
| Sept. 8 | Football | 3.0 | UNM | 1.50 | 3.00 |
| Sept. 14–15 | Men's Golf | 1.50 | UNM | 1.50 | 4.50 |
| Dec. 2 | Women's Basketball | 1.50 | NMSU | 3.00 | 4.50 |
| Dec. 4 | Men's Basketball | 1.50 | NMSU | 4.50 | 4.50 |
| Dec. 19 | Men's Basketball | 1.50 | UNM | 4.50 | 6.00 |
| Dec. 21 | Women's Basketball | 1.50 | UNM | 4.50 | 7.50 |
| Jan. 21 | Women's Swimming | 1.50 | NMSU | 6.00 | 7.50 |
| Feb. 3 | Women's Tennis | 1.50 | UNM | 6.00 | 9.00 |
| Feb. 22 | Men's Tennis | 1.50 | UNM | 6.00 | 10.50 |
| March 18 | Baseball | 0.75 | UNM | 6.00 | 11.25 |
| March 18 | Baseball | 0.75 | UNM | 6.00 | 12.00 |
| March 25 | Baseball | 0.75 | NMSU | 6.75 | 12.00 |
| March 26 | Baseball | 0.75 | UNM | 6.75 | 12.75 |
| April 8 | Softball | 0.75 | UNM | 6.75 | 13.50 |
| April 22 | Softball | 0.75 | UNM | 6.75 | 14.75 |
| May 3–4 | Women's Track & Field Don Kirby Invitational | 1.50 | UNM | 6.75 | 16.25 |

=== Scoreboard 2008–2009 ===
| DATE | EVENT | Point | Win | NMSU | UNM |
|---|---|---|---|---|---|
| Sept. 18–20 | Women's Golf | 1.50 | UNM | 0 | 1.50 |
| Sept. 27 | Football | 3.00 | UNM | 0 | 4.50 |
| Nov. 15 | Men's Cross Country NCAA Men's Mountain Region Championship | 1.50 | UNM | 0 | 6.00 |
| Nov. 15 | Women's Cross Country NCAA Women's Mountain Region Championship | 1.50 | UNM | 0 | 7.50 |
| Nov. 28 | Volleyball | 3.00 | NMSU | 3.00 | 7.50 |
| Dec. 4 | Women's Basketball | 1.50 | UNM | 3.00 | 9.00 |
| Dec. 20 | Women's Basketball | 1.50 | UNM | 3.00 | 10.50 |
| Dec 23 | Men's Basketball | 1.50 | UNM | 3.00 | 12.00 |
| Dec 30 | Men's Basketball | 1.50 | UNM | 3.00 | 13.50 |
| Jan. 28 | Women's Swimming | 1.50 | NMSU | 4.50 | 13.50 |
| March 3 | Baseball | 0.75 | UNM | 4.50 | 14.25 |
| March 8 | Women's Tennis | 1.50 | UNM | 4.50 | 15.75 |
| March 10 | Baseball | 0.75 | NMSU | 5.25 | 15.75 |
| March 15 | Men's Tennis | 1.50 | UNM | 5.25 | 17.25 |
| March 24 | Softball | 0.75 | NMSU | 6.00 | 17.25 |
| April 28 | Softball | 0.75 | NMSU | 6.75 | 17.25 |

=== Scoreboard 2009–2010 ===
| DATE | EVENT | Point | Win | NMSU | UNM |
|---|---|---|---|---|---|
| Sept. 11–12 | Men's Golf | 1.50 | UNM | 0 | 1.50 |
| Sept. 14–15 | Women's Golf Ptarmigan Ram Fall Classic, Ft. Collins, CO | 1.50 | UNM | 0 | 3.00 |
| Sept. 26 | Football | 3.00 | NMSU | 3.00 | 3.00 |
| Oct. 13 | Volleyball | 3.00 | UNM | 3.00 | 6.00 |
| Nov. 14 | Men's Cross Country NCAA Men's Mountain Region Championship | 1.50 | UNM | 3.00 | 7.50 |
| Nov. 14 | Women's Cross Country NCAA Women's Mountain Region Championship | 1.50 | UNM | 3.00 | 9.00 |
| Nov. 14 | Women's Swimming & Diving | 1.50 | NMSU | 4.50 | 9.00 |
| Nov. 17 | Men's Basketball | 1.50 | UNM | 4.50 | 10.50 |
| Dec. 2 | Women's Basketball | 1.50 | UNM | 4.50 | 12.00 |
| Dec. 5 | Men's Basketball | 1.50 | UNM | 4.50 | 13.50 |
| Dec. 20 | Women's Basketball | 1.50 | UNM | 4.50 | 15.00 |
| Feb. 19 | Men's Tennis | 1.50 | NMSU | 6.00 | 15.00 |
| March 2 | Baseball | 0.75 | UNM | 6.00 | 15.75 |
| March 3 | Baseball | 0.75 | NMSU | 6.75 | 15.75 |
| March 9 | Baseball | 0.75 | NMSU | 7.50 | 15.75 |
| March 10 | Baseball | 0.75 | UNM | 7.50 | 16.50 |
| March 13 | Women's Tennis | 1.50 | NMSU | 9.00 | 16.50 |
| April 6 | Softball | 0.75 | NMSU | 9.75 | 16.50 |
| April 20 | Softball | 0.75 | NMSU | 10.50 | 16.50 |

=== Scoreboard 2010–2011 ===
| DATE | EVENT | Point | Win | NMSU | UNM |
|---|---|---|---|---|---|
| Sept. 3 | Women's Soccer | 1.50 | UNM | 0 | 1.50 |
| Sept. 13–14 | Women's Golf Ptarmigan Intercollegiate, Ft. Collins, CO | 1.50 | UNM | 0 | 3.00 |
| Sept. 14 | Volleyball | 3.00 | UNM | 0 | 6.00 |
| Oct. 1–2 | Men's Golf | 1.50 | UNM | 0 | 7.50 |
| Oct. 9 | Football | 3.00 | NMSU | 3.00 | 7.50 |
| Nov. 13 | Men's Cross Country NCAA Men's Mountain Region Championship | 1.50 | UNM | 3.00 | 9.00 |
| Nov. 13 | Women's Cross Country NCAA Women's Mountain Region Championship | 1.50 | UNM | 3.00 | 10.50 |
| Dec. 1 | Women's Basketball | 1.50 | UNM | 3.00 | 12.00 |
| Dec. 4 | Men's Basketball | 1.50 | UNM | 3.00 | 13.50 |
| Dec. 11 | Men's Basketball | 1.50 | UNM | 3.00 | 15.00 |
| Dec. 30 | Women's Basketball | 1.50 | UNM | 3.00 | 16.50 |
| Jan. 29 | Men's Tennis | 1.50 | UNM | 3.00 | 18.00 |
| Feb. 5 | Women's Swimming & Diving | 1.50 | NMSU | 4.50 | 18.00 |
| Feb. 11 | Women's Tennis | 1.50 | NMSU | 6.00 | 18.00 |
| Feb. 22 | Baseball | 1.5 | NMSU | 7.50 | 18.00 |
| March 8 | Baseball | 1.5 | NMSU | 9.00 | 18.00 |
| April 4 | Softball | 0.75 | UNM | 9.00 | 18.75 |
| April 19 | Softball | 0.75 | NMSU | 9.75 | 18.75 |

=== Scoreboard 2011–2012 ===
| DATE | EVENT | Point | Win | NMSU | UNM |
|---|---|---|---|---|---|
| Sept. 12–13 | Men's Golf Simpson Invitational, Erie, CO | 1.50 | UNM | 0 | 1.50 |
| Sept. 25 | Women's Soccer | 1.50 | UNM | 0 | 3.00 |
| Oct. 1 | Football | 3.00 | NMSU | 3.00 | 3.00 |
| Oct. 4 | Women's Volleyball | 3.00 | NMSU | 6.00 | 3.00 |
| Nov. 12 | Men's Cross Country NCAA Mountain Region Championships, Provo, UT | 1.50 | UNM | 6.00 | 4.50 |
| Nov. 12 | Women's Cross Country NCAA Mountain Region Championships, Provo, UT | 1.50 | UNM | 6.00 | 6.00 |
| Nov. 16 | Men's Basketball | 1.50 | NMSU | 7.50 | 6.00 |
| Dec. 4 | Women's Basketball | 1.50 | UNM | 7.50 | 7.50 |
| Dec. 28 | Men's Basketball | 1.50 | UNM | 7.50 | 9.00 |
| Dec. 30 | Women's Basketball | 1.50 | UNM | 7.50 | 10.50 |
| Feb. 4 | Swimming & Diving | 1.50 | Tie | 8.25 | 11.25 |
| Feb. 5–7 | Women's Golf Wildcat Invitational, Tucson, AZ | 1.50 | UNM | 8.25 | 12.75 |
| Feb. 8 | Men's Tennis | 1.50 | UNM | 8.25 | 14.25 |
| Mar. 6 | Baseball | 0.75 | NMSU | 9.00 | 14.25 |
| Mar. 13 | Baseball | 0.75 | NMSU | 9.75 | 14.25 |
| Mar. 14 | Softball | 0.75 | NMSU | 10.50 | 14.25 |
| Apr.3 | Baseball | 0.75 | NMSU | 11.25 | 14.25 |
| Apr. 10 | Softball | 0.75 | NMSU | 12.00 | 14.25 |
| Apr. 21 | Women's Tennis | 1.50 | NMSU | 13.50 | 14.25 |
| May 15 | Baseball | 0.75 | UNM | 13.50 | 15.00 |

=== Scoreboard 2012–2013 ===
| DATE | EVENT | Point | Win | UNM | NMSU |
|---|---|---|---|---|---|
| Sept. 10–11 | Women's Golf | 1.50 | UNM | 1.50 | 0.00 |
| Sept. 16 | Women's Soccer | 1.50 | UNM | 3.00 | 0.00 |
| Sept. 22 | Football | 3.00 | UNM | 6.00 | 0.00 |
| Sept. 28–29 | Men's Golf | 1.50 | UNM | 7.50 | 0.00 |
| Oct. 23 | Volleyball | 3.00 | NMSU | 7.50 | 3.00 |
| Nov. 9 | Women's Cross Country | 1.50 | UNM | 9.00 | 3.00 |
| Nov. 9 | Men's Cross Country | 1.50 | UNM | 10.50 | 3.00 |
| Nov. 20 | Women's Basketball | 1.50 | UNM | 12.00 | 3.00 |
| Dec. 15 | Men's Basketball | 1.50 | UNM | 13.50 | 3.00 |
| Dec. 18 | Women's Basketball | 1.50 | UNM | 15.00 | 3.00 |
| Dec. 19 | Men's Basketball | 1.50 | UNM | 16.50 | 3.00 |
| Feb. 2 | Swimming & Diving | 0.75 | UNM | 17.25 | 3.00 |
| March 9 | Men's Tennis | 1.50 | UNM | 18.75 | 3.00 |
| March 30 | Women's Tennis | 1.50 | UNM | 20.25 | 3.00 |
| April 1 | Baseball | 0.75 | NMSU | 20.25 | 3.75 |
| April 17 | Baseball | 0.75 | UNM | 21.00 | 4.50 |
| March 8 | Softball | 0.75 | NMSU | 21.00 | 5.25 |
| March 8 | Softball (Doubleheader) | 0.75 | NMSU | 21.00 | 6.00 |

=== Scoreboard 2013-2014 ===
| DATE | EVENT | Point | Win | UNM | NMSU |
|---|---|---|---|---|---|
| Aug. 25 | Women's Soccer | 1.50 | UNM | 1.50 | 0.00 |
| Sep. 7 | Men's Cross Country | 1.50 | UNM | 3.00 | 0.00 |
| Sep. 7 | Women's Cross Country | 1.50 | NMSU | 3.00 | 1.50 |
| Sep. 23 | Volleyball | 3.00 | UNM | 6.00 | 1.50 |
| Sep. 28-29 | Men's Golf William H. Tucker Invitational | 1.50 | UNM | 7.50 | 1.50 |
| Oct. 5 | Football | 3.00 | UNM | 10.50 | 1.50 |
| Dec. 4 | Men's Basketball | 1.50 | UNM | 12.00 | 1.50 |
| Dec. 7 | Women's Basketball | 1.50 | UNM | 13.50 | 1.50 |
| Dec. 17 | Men's Basketball | 1.50 | NMSU | 13.50 | 3.00 |
| March 19 | Softball | 0.75 | UNM | 14.25 | 3.00 |
| March 21 | Women's Tennis | 1.50 | UNM | 15.75 | 3.00 |
| March 22 | Men's Tennis | 1.50 | UNM | 17.25 | 3.00 |
| March 25 | Baseball | 0.75 | UNM | 18.00 | 3.00 |
| April 2 | Baseball | 0.75 | UNM | 18.75 | 3.00 |
| April 29 | Softball | 0.75 | NMSU | 18.75 | 3.75 |

=== Scoreboard 2014-2015 ===
| DATE | EVENT | Point | Win | UNM | NMSU |
|---|---|---|---|---|---|
| Sep. 6 | Women's Cross Country | 1.50 | UNM | 1.50 | 0.00 |
| Sep. 6 | Men's Cross Country | 1.50 | UNM | 3.00 | 0.00 |
| Sep. 19 | Women's Soccer | 1.50 | UNM | 4.50 | 0.00 |
| Sep. 20 | Football | 3.00 | UNM | 7.50 | 0.00 |
| Sep. 26-27 | Men's Golf William H. Tucker Invitational | 1.50 | UNM | 9.00 | 0.00 |
| Oct. 20 | Volleyball | 3.00 | UNM | 12.00 | 0.00 |
| Dec. 3 | Men's Basketball | 1.50 | UNM | 13.50 | 0.00 |
| Dec. 7 | Women's Basketball | 1.50 | NMSU | 13.50 | 1.50 |
| Dec. 20 | Men's Basketball | 1.50 | UNM | 15.00 | 1.50 |
| Jan. 26-27 | Men's Golf Arizona Intercollegiate | 1.50 | UNM | 16.50 | 1.50 |
| Jan. 31 | Women's Swim and Dive | 1.50 | UNM | 18.00 | 1.50 |
| March 14 | Women's Tennis | 1.50 | UNM | 19.50 | 1.50 |
| March 16–17 | Women's Golf Arizona Wildcat Invitational | 1.50 | NMSU | 19.50 | 3.00 |
| March 24 | Softball | 0.75 | NMSU | 19.50 | 3.75 |
| April 14 | Softball | 0.75 | NMSU | 19.50 | 4.50 |
| April 21 | Baseball | 0.75 | UNM | 20.25 | 4.50 |
| May 5 | Baseball | 0.75 | NMSU | 20.25 | 5.25 |

=== Scoreboard 2015-2016 ===
| DATE | EVENT | Point | Win | UNM | NMSU |
|---|---|---|---|---|---|
| Aug. 26 | Women's Soccer | 1.50 | UNM | 1.50 | 0.00 |
| Sep. 29 | Volleyball | 3.00 | NMSU | 1.50 | 3.00 |
| Oct. 3 | Football | 3.00 | UNM | 4.50 | 3.00 |
| Nov. 15 | Men's Basketball | 1.50 | UNM | 6.00 | 3.00 |
| Nov. 17 | Women's Basketball | 1.50 | NMSU | 6.00 | 4.50 |
| Dec. 16 | Men's Basketball | 1.50 | UNM | 7.50 | 4.50 |
| Dec. 20 | Women's Basketball | 1.50 | NMSU | 7.50 | 6.00 |
| Jan. 29-30 | Men's Golf Arizona Intercollegiate | 1.50 | UNM | 9.00 | 6.00 |
| Jan. 30 | Women's Swim and Dive | 1.50 | UNM | 10.50 | 6.00 |
| March 8 | Baseball | 0.75 | NMSU | 10.50 | 6.75 |
| March 8 | Softball | 0.75 | NMSU | 10.50 | 7.50 |
| March 15 | Women's Golf Wildcat Invitational | 1.50 | NMSU | 10.50 | 9.00 |
| April 5 | Baseball | 0.75 | UNM | 11.25 | 9.00 |
| April 8–9 | Women's Golf Red Raider Invitational | 1.50 | UNM | 13.75 | 9.00 |
| April 17 | Women's Tennis | 1.50 | UNM | 15.25 | 9.00 |
| April 26 | Baseball | 0.75 | UNM | 16.00 | 9.00 |
| May 4 | Softball | 0.75 | NMSU | 16.00 | 9.75 |
| May 5 | Baseball | 0.75 | UNM | 16.75 | 9.75 |

=== Scoreboard 2016-2017 ===
| DATE | EVENT | Point | Win | UNM | NMSU |
|---|---|---|---|---|---|
| Sep. 10 | Football | 3.00 | NMSU | 0.00 | 3.00 |
| Sep. 16 | Women's Soccer | 1.50 | UNM | 1.50 | 3.00 |
| Sep. 23-24 | Men's Golf William H. Tucker Invitational | 1.50 | UNM | 3.00 | 3.00 |
| Oct. 23-25 | Women's Golf Las Vegas Colligate Showdown | 1.50 | NMSU | 3.00 | 4.50 |
| Nov. 11 | Women's Cross Country NCAA Mountain Regional | 1.50 | UNM | 4.50 | 4.50 |
| Nov. 11 | Men's Cross Country NCAA Mountain Regional | 1.50 | UNM | 6.00 | 4.50 |
| Nov. 15 | Women's Basketball | 1.50 | UNM | 7.50 | 4.50 |
| Nov. 18 | Men's Basketball | 1.50 | UNM | 9.00 | 4.50 |
| Nov. 30 | Women's Basketball | 1.50 | NMSU | 9.00 | 6.00 |
| Dec. 10 | Men's Basketball | 1.50 | NMSU | 9.00 | 7.50 |
| Jan. 23-24 | Men's Golf Arizona Intercollegiate | 1.50 | UNM | 10.50 | 7.50 |
| Jan. 28 | Women's Swim and Dive | 1.50 | UNM | 12.00 | 7.50 |
| Feb. 25 | Men's Tennis | 1.50 | UNM | 13.50 | 7.50 |
| March 7 | Baseball | 0.75 | UNM | 14.25 | 7.50 |
| March 15 | Softball | 0.75 | NMSU | 14.25 | 8.25 |
| March 25 | Women's Tennis | 1.50 | UNM | 15.75 | 8.25 |
| March 28 | Baseball | 0.75 | UNM | 16.50 | 8.25 |
| May 2 | Softball | 0.75 | NMSU | 16.50 | 9.00 |
| May 2 | Baseball | 0.75 | UNM | 16.50 | 9.75 |

=== Scoreboard 2017-2018 ===
| DATE | EVENT | Point | Win | UNM | NMSU |
|---|---|---|---|---|---|
| Aug. 24 | Women's Soccer | 1.50 | NMSU | 0.00 | 1.50 |
| Sep. 2 | Women's Cross Country | 1.50 | UNM | 1.50 | 1.50 |
| Sep. 2 | Men's Cross Country | 1.50 | UNM | 3.00 | 1.50 |
| Sep. 9 | Football | 3.00 | NMSU | 3.00 | 4.50 |
| Sep. 22-23 | Men's Golf William H. Tucker Invitational | 1.50 | UNM | 4.50 | 4.50 |
| Nov. 17 | Men's Basketball | 1.50 | NMSU | 4.50 | 6.00 |
| Nov. 18 | Women's Basketball | 1.50 | UNM | 6.00 | 6.00 |
| Dec. 2 | Women's Basketball | 1.50 | UNM | 7.50 | 6.00 |
| Dec. 9 | Men's Basketball | 1.50 | NMSU | 7.50 | 7.50 |
| Jan. 27 | Women's Swim and Dive | 1.50 | UNM | 9.00 | 7.50 |
| Jan. 29-30 | Men's Golf Arizona Intercollegiate | 1.50 | UNM | 10.50 | 7.50 |
| April 1 | Women's Tennis | 1.50 | UNM | 12.00 | 7.50 |
| April 10 | Baseball | 0.75 | NMSU | 12.00 | 8.25 |
| March 15 | Men's Tennis | 1.50 | NMSU | 12.00 | 9.75 |
| March 22 | Softball | 0.75 | UNM | 12.75 | 9.75 |
| May 1 | Baseball | 0.75 | NMSU | 12.75 | 10.50 |
| May 8 | Baseball | 0.75 | NMSU | 12.75 | 11.25 |

=== Scoreboard 2018-2019 ===
| DATE | EVENT | Point | Win | UNM | NMSU |
|---|---|---|---|---|---|
| Sep. 1 | Men's Cross Country | 1.50 | UNM | 1.50 | 0.00 |
| Sep. 1 | Volleyball | 3.00 | NMSU | 1.50 | 3.00 |
| Sep. 10-11 | Women's Golf Dick McGuire Invitational | 1.50 | UNM | 3.00 | 3.00 |
| Sep. 14 | Women's Soccer | 1.50 | UNM | 4.50 | 3.00 |
| Sep. 15 | Football | 3.00 | UNM | 7.50 | 3.00 |
| Sep. 15 | Women's Cross Country | 1.50 | UNM | 9.00 | 3.00 |
| Sep. 18-29 | Men's Golf William H. Tucker Invitational | 1.50 | UNM | 10.50 | 3.00 |
| Nov. 9 | Women's Cross Country NCAA Regionals | 1.50 | UNM | 12.00 | 3.00 |
| Nov. 17 | Men's Basketball | 1.50 | NMSU | 12.00 | 4.50 |
| Dec. 3 | Women's Basketball | 1.50 | UNM | 13.50 | 4.50 |
| Dec. 4 | Men's Basketball | 1.50 | NMSU | 13.50 | 6.00 |
| Dec. 5 | Women's Basketball | 1.50 | UNM | 15.00 | 6.00 |
| Jan. 19 | Women's Swim and Dive | 1.50 | UNM | 16.50 | 6.00 |
| Jan. 28-29 | Men's Golf Arizona Intercollegiate | 1.50 | UNM | 18.00 | 6.00 |
| Feb. 9 | Softball | 0.75 | NMSU | 18.00 | 6.75 |
| March 26 | Baseball | 0.75 | NMSU | 18.00 | 7.50 |
| April 2 | Softball | 0.75 | NMSU | 18.00 | 8.25 |
| April 2 | Softball | 0.75 | NMSU | 18.00 | 9.00 |
| April 6 | Baseball | 0.75 | NMSU | 18.00 | 9.75 |
| April 12 | Women's Tennis | 1.50 | UNM | 19.50 | 9.75 |
| April 23 | Softball | 0.75 | NMSU | 19.50 | 10.50 |

=== Scoreboard 2019-2020 (Shortened COVID-19 year) ===
| DATE | EVENT | Point | Win | UNM | NMSU |
|---|---|---|---|---|---|
| Aug. 31 | Women's Cross Country | 1.50 | UNM | 1.50 | 0.00 |
| Aug. 31 | Men's Cross Country | 1.50 | UNM | 3.00 | 0.00 |
| Sep. 7 | Women's Volleyball | 3.00 | NMSU | 3.00 | 3.00 |
| Sep. 20 | Women's Soccer | 1.50 | UNM | 4.50 | 3.00 |
| Sep. 21 | Football | 3.00 | UNM | 7.50 | 3.00 |
| Sep. 24-25 | Men's Golf William H. Tucker Invitational | 1.50 | UNM | 9.00 | 3.00 |
| Nov. 21 | Men's Basketball | 1.50 | UNM | 10.50 | 3.00 |
| Dec. 3 | Women's Basketball | 1.50 | UNM | 12.00 | 3.00 |
| Dec. 5 | Women's Basketball | 1.50 | UNM | 13.50 | 3.00 |
| Dec. 14 | Men's Basketball | 1.50 | UNM | 15.00 | 3.00 |
| Jan. 25 | Women's Swim and Dive | 0.75 | UNM | 15.75 | 3.00 |
| Jan. 25 | Men's Golf Arizona Intercollegiate | 1.50 | UNM | 17.50 | 3.00 |
| Feb. 1 | Women's Tennis | 1.50 | NMSU | 17.50 | 4.50 |
| Mar. 9-10 | Women's Golf Arizona Wildcat Invitational | 1.50 | NMSU | 17.50 | 6.00 |
| March 11 | Softball | 0.75 | NMSU | 17.50 | 6.75 |
| March 21 | Men's Tennis | Cancelled | | | |
| April 15 | Softball | Cancelled | | | |
| April 28 | Baseball | Cancelled | | | |
| May 5 | Baseball | Cancelled | | | |
| May 12 | Baseball | Cancelled | | | |

=== Scoreboard 2020-2021 (Shortened COVID-19 year) ===
| DATE | EVENT | Point | Win | UNM | NMSU |
|---|---|---|---|---|---|
| Jan. 25-27 | Men's Golf Arizona Intercollegiate | 1.50 | UNM | 1.50 | 0.00 |
| Feb. 25 | Women's Tennis | 1.50 | UNM | 3.00 | 0.00 |
| May 17–19 | Men's Golf NCAA Regional | 1.50 | UNM | 4.50 | 0.00 |
| Mar. 8-9 | Women's Golf Arizona Wildcat Invitational | 1.50 | UNM | 6.00 | 0.00 |
| Apr. 11-12 | Women's Golf Dick McGuire Invitational | 1.50 | UNM | 7.50 | 0.00 |

=== Scoreboard 2021-2022 ===
| DATE | EVENT | Point | Win | UNM | NMSU |
|---|---|---|---|---|---|
| Sep. 11 | Football | 3.00 | UNM | 3.00 | 0.00 |
| Sep. 13-14 | Women's Golf Dick McGuire Invitational | 1.50 | UNM | 4.50 | 0.00 |
| Sep. 16 | Women's Soccer | 1.50 | UNM | 6.00 | 0.00 |
| Sep. 17-19 | Women's Tennis Aggie Invitational | 1.50 | UNM | 7.50 | 0.00 |
| Sep. 18 | Men's Cross Country Lori Fitzgerald Invitational | 1.50 | UNM | 9.00 | 0.00 |
| Sep. 18 | Women's Cross Country Lori Fitzgerald Invitational | 1.50 | UNM | 10.50 | 0.00 |
| Sep. 24-25 | Men's Golf William H. Tucker Invitational | 1.50 | UNM | 12.00 | 0.00 |
| October 4 | Men's Tennis Arizona Invitational | 1.50 | UNM | 13.50 | 0.00 |
| October 30 | Women's Swim and Dive | 0.75 | NMSU | 13.50 | 0.75 |
| Nov. 30 | Men's Basketball | 1.50 | UNM | 15.00 | 0.75 |
| Dec. 3 | Women's Basketball | 1.50 | UNM | 16.50 | 0.75 |
| Dec. 5 | Women's Basketball | 1.50 | UNM | 18.00 | 0.75 |
| Dec. 6 | Men's Basketball | 1.50 | NMSU | 18.00 | 2.25 |
| Jan. 29 | Women's Swim and Dive | 0.75 | NMSU | 18.00 | 3.00 |
| March 8 | Softball | 0.75 | NMSU | 18.00 | 3.75 |
| Mar. 8 | Softball (Doubleheader) | 0.75 | NMSU | 18.00 | 4.50 |
| Mar. 29 | Baseball | 0.75 | UNM | 18.75 | 4.50 |
| April 5 | Baseball | 0.75 | UNM | 19.50 | 4.50 |
| May 10 | Baseball | 0.75 | UNM | 20.25 | 4.50 |
| May 17 | Baseball | 0.75 | UNM | 21.00 | 4.50 |

=== Scoreboard 2022-2023 ===
| DATE | EVENT | Point | Win | UNM | NMSU |
|---|---|---|---|---|---|
| Sep. 10 | Women's Cross Country | 1.50 | NMSU | 0 | 1.50 |
| Sep. 10 | Men's Cross Country | 1.50 | UNM | 1.50 | 1.50 |
| Sep. 24 | Men's Golf William H. Tucker Invitational | 1.50 | UNM | 3.00 | 1.50 |
| Oct. 15 | Football | 3.00 | NMSU | 3.00 | 4.50 |
| Nov. 15 | Women's Basketball | 1.50 | NMSU | 3.00 | 6.00 |
| Nov. 19 | Men's Basketball | 1.50 | Cancelled | | |
| Dec. 3 | Men's Basketball | 1.50 | Cancelled | | |
| Dec. 11 | Women's Basketball | 1.50 | UNM | 4.50 | 6.00 |
| Jan. 28 | Women's Swim and Dive | 0.75 | NMSU | 4.50 | 6.75 |
| Feb. 4 | Men's Tennis | 1.50 | UNM | 6.00 | 6.75 |
| Feb. 25 | Women's Tennis | 1.50 | UNM | 7.50 | 6.75 |
| Feb. 25 | Softball | 0.75 | NMSU | 7.50 | 7.50 |
| Feb. 26 | Men's Tennis | 1.50 | UNM | 9.00 | 7.50 |
| Mar. 21 | Baseball | 0.75 | NMSU | 9.00 | 8.25 |
| Mar. 28 | Softball | 0.75 | UNM | 9.75 | 8.25 |
| Apr. 18 | Baseball | 0.75 | UNM | 10.50 | 8.25 |
| May 2 | Baseball | 0.75 | UNM | 11.25 | 8.25 |
| May 16 | Baseball | 0.75 | NMSU | 11.25 | 9.00 |

=== Scoreboard 2023-2024 ===
| DATE | EVENT | Point | Win | UNM | NMSU |
|---|---|---|---|---|---|
| Sep. 10 | Women's Soccer | 1.50 | UNM | 1.50 | 0.00 |
| Sep. 16 | Football | 3.00 | NMSU | 1.50 | 3.00 |
