= Gerard Carter Community Center =

Sports venue in Staten Island, New York

Coordinates: 40.62370°N 74.08215°W

- Interactive map of Gerard Carter Community Center
- Location: 230 Broad Street, Staten Island, NY 10304
- Operator: Managed by JCC professionals and staff from the community
- Surface: Hardwood

Tenant
- Staten Island Vipers (2012-)

The Gerard Carter Community Center is a facility located in Staten Island, New York. Its main basketball court is home to the Staten Island Vipers of the American Basketball Association (ABA).
