= Clayton Shields =

American basketball player and coach

Personal information
- Born: March 28, 1976 (age 50)
- Listed height: 6 ft 8 in (2.03 m)
- Listed weight: 210 lb (95 kg)

Career information
- High school: Lee (Baytown, Texas)
- College: New Mexico (1994–1998)
- NBA draft: 1998: undrafted
- Position: Small forward

Career history
- 1999–2000: Athlon Leper

Career highlights
- WAC Co-Player of the Year (1998); First-team All-WAC (1998)

Clayton Shields (born March 28, 1976) is a retired American basketball player. He was named Western Athletic Conference co-Player of the Year at the University of New Mexico and played professionally in six countries.

Shields, a 6'8 small forward from Baytown, Texas, played college basketball at New Mexico from 1994 to 1998. As a freshman, Shields cracked the starting lineup and averaged 10.5 points and 4.8 rebounds per game, making the Western Athletic Conference (WAC) all-newcomer team. Shields would start for his remaining three years, scoring 1,837 points (14.4 per game) and collecting 758 rebounds (5.9 per game) for his career. As a senior in 1997–98, Shields was named co-WAC player of the year with Texas Christian's Lee Nailon, after averaging 16.7 points and 6.8 rebounds and leading the Lobos to the 1998 NCAA Tournament.

After graduating from New Mexico, Shields played professionally in Italy, Cyprus, Belgium, Portugal and Australia, as well as in the United States. He later returned to the state of New Mexico as the coach of the Gallup Talons.American Basketball Association's Gallup Talons.

Since the end of his playing and coaching career, Shields has pursued a career in law enforcement, serving since 2010 as a criminal investigator in the District Attorney's office in Dallas County, Texas.
