= Robert Whaley =

American basketball player (born 1982)

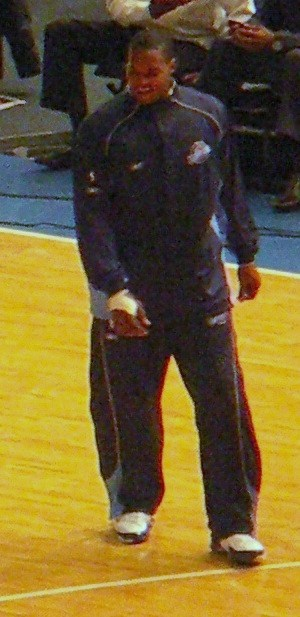
- Whaley with the Jazz in December 2005

Personal information
- Born: April 16, 1982 (age 44) Benton Harbor, Michigan, U.S.
- Listed height: 6 ft 10 in (2.08 m)
- Listed weight: 260 lb (118 kg)

Career information
- High school: Benton Harbor (Benton Harbor, Michigan)
- College: Barton CC (2001–2003); Cincinnati (2003–2004); Walsh (2004–2005)
- NBA draft: 2005: 2nd round, 51st overall pick
- Drafted by: Utah Jazz
- Playing career: 2005–2008
- Position: Center
- Number: 54

Career history
- 2005–2006: Utah Jazz
- 2006: Metros de Santiago
- 2006–2007: Twin City Ballers
- 2007: Petrochimi Imam
- 2007–2008: Los Angeles D-Fenders

Career highlights
- NAIA Division II Player of the Year (2005); NAIA Division II tournament MVP (2005); First-team NJCAA All-American (2002); Second-team NJCAA All-American (2003)
- Stats at NBA.com
- Stats at Basketball Reference

Robert Antawon Whaley (born April 16, 1982) is an American former professional basketball player.

== High school and college career ==
Whaley graduated from Benton Harbor High School in 2001. He was a leading contender for Mr. Basketball of Michigan, but Benton Harbor came up just short of winning the championship. He attended Barton County Community College for two years, then transferred to the University of Cincinnati in 2003 and Walsh University in 2004. He was the NAIA Division II Player of the Year in 2004–05 and led Walsh to its first NAIA National Championship. He averaged 19.9 points and 7.5 rebounds in 35 games as a senior. Walsh left the NAIA and joined the NCAA in 2011.

== Professional career ==
=== Utah Jazz (2005–2006) ===
Whaley was selected by the Utah Jazz with 51st overall pick in the 2005 NBA draft, becoming the most recent player drafted out of an NAIA school, as of 2018. As a rookie in 2005–06, Whaley appeared in 23 games and averaged 2.1 points and 1.9 rebounds per game. He scored a career-high 11 points on December 23, 2005, against the New York Knicks. On January 26, 2006, he was ruled out indefinitely with torn cartilage in his right knee. He returned to action in March 2006, but appeared in just one further game after returning to injury.

On December 11, 2005, Whaley and teammate Deron Williams got into an altercation with a group of Denver Nuggets fans who were harassing them outside a Park City club. Both Whaley and Williams gave police false names at that time, and both were cited for providing false information to police. Whaley, who sustained a 6-inch cut on his hand at the bar that night, was suspended one game by the Jazz for lying about how he received the injury. On June 8, 2006, Whaley was traded, along with Kris Humphries, to the Toronto Raptors in exchange for Rafael Araújo. He was later waived by the Raptors on June 21, 2006.

=== Post-NBA (2006–2008) ===
After being released by the Toronto Raptors, Whaley moved to the Dominican Republic where he played briefly with Metros de Santiago. For the 2006–07 season, he joined the Twin City Ballers of the American Basketball Association. In March 2007, he left the Ballers and joined Petrochimi Imam of Iran for the rest of the season.

On November 1, 2007, Whaley was selected by the Los Angeles D-Fenders in the second round of the 2007 NBA Development League Draft. He was waived by the team on January 4, 2008, and reacquired on February 13. In 22 games (nine starts) for the D-Fenders in 2007–08, he averaged 4.0 points and 2.7 rebounds in 12.3 minutes per game.

== Post-basketball life ==
In September 2008, Whaley was convicted in Michigan of running a drug house. Having absconded from his probation in January 2009, a National Crime Information Center warrant was issued for his arrest in March 2010. He was arrested in Salt Lake County, and while he was being searched to be booked into jail, officers found several bags of marijuana on his possession. In June 2010, he was extradited to Michigan, and was later sentenced to a two-year jail term in which he served between 2010 and 2012.

In 2014, Whaley became an assistant coach for Utah Elite, a talented AAU program made up primarily of fifth-graders.

On March 7, 2016, Whaley was ordered to serve 60 days in Davis County Jail after pleading guilty to a third-degree felony count of burglary. He was arrested on May 1, 2015, for burglarizing a Layton Marriott Hotel.

== Career statistics ==
Legend
GP	Games played	GS	Games started	MPG	Minutes per game
FG%	Field goal percentage	3P%	3-point field goal percentage	FT%	Free throw percentage
RPG	Rebounds per game	APG	Assists per game	SPG	Steals per game
BPG	Blocks per game	PPG	Points per game	**Bold**	Career high

=== NBA ===
==== Regular season ====
Year	Team	GP	GS	MPG	FG%	3P%	FT%	RPG	APG	SPG	BPG	PPG
2005–06	Utah	23	0	9.2	.404	—	.500	1.9	.7	.3	.3	2.1
