= Barre Auditorium =

Multi-purpose arena in Barre, Vermont

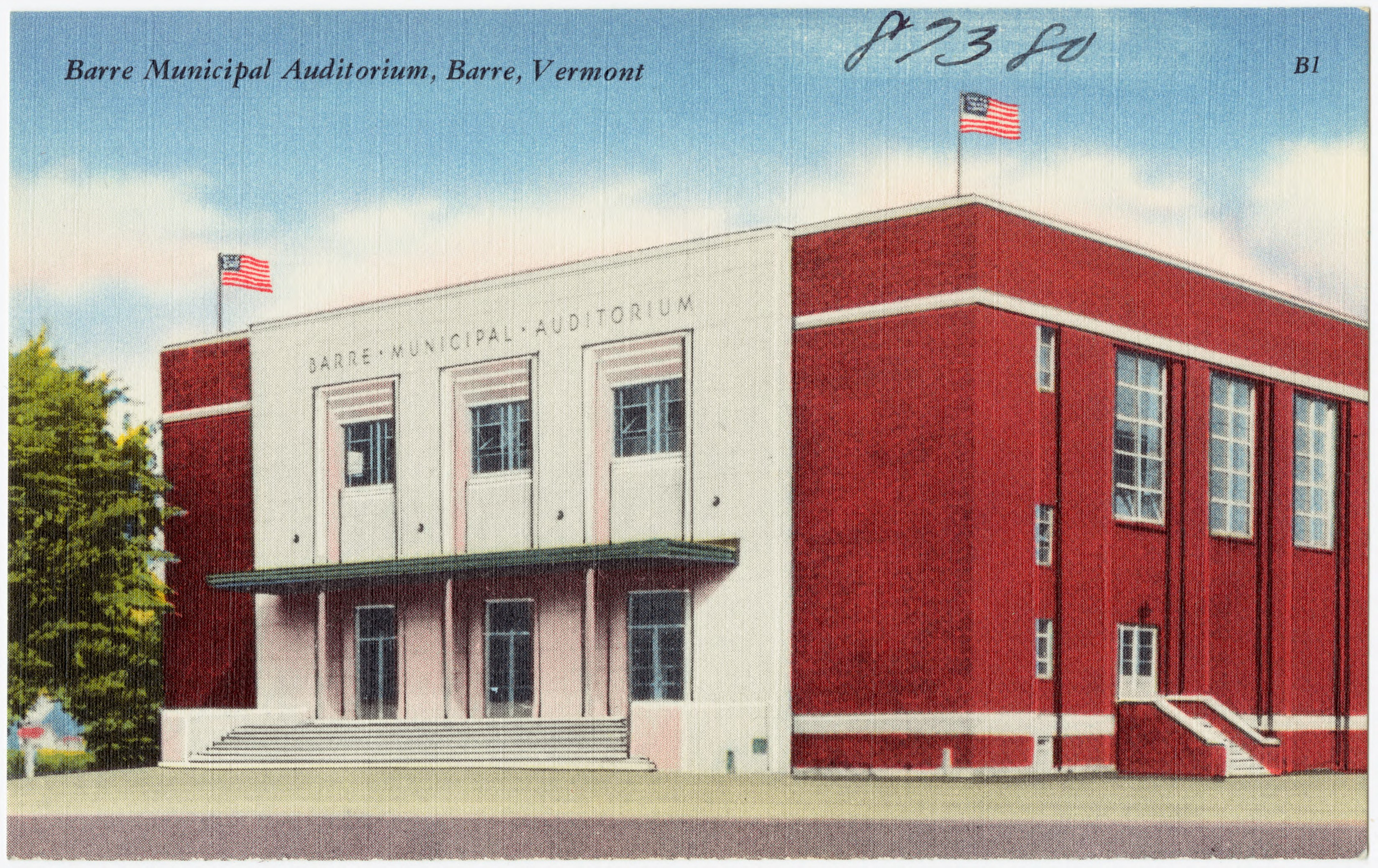
- Barre Auditorium, pictured before 1945
- Interactive map of Barre Auditorium
- Location: Barre, Vermont
- Coordinates: 44.203435°N 72.502711°W
- Capacity: 1,856

Construction
- Groundbreaking: 1938
- Opened: 1939

Tenant
- Vermont Frost Heaves (ABA/PBL) (2006–2010)

Barre Auditorium is a 1,856-seat multi-purpose arena in Barre, Vermont.

The Barre Municipal Auditorium, also called The AUD, was built in 1939 as a federal Public Works Administration project. The hall serves a variety of uses including hosting trade and farm shows, emergency shelters during natural disasters, town fairs, concerts and municipal voting. The main floor of the building has 10,000 square feet of open space or can be arranged to seat 1,856 people. There is also 9,000 square feet of space on the ground level and the building has a commercial kitchen.

The AUD was one of the homes of the Vermont Frost Heaves of the Premier Basketball League, along with the Burlington Memorial Auditorium. While the University of Vermont's Patrick Gymnasium hosts all Division I high school basketball semifinal and finals, the Barre Auditorium is the site of all Division II, III, and IV semifinal and finals.

In 2023 a group of architecture, engineering, and construction management students at Norwich University did a feasibility study for improvements and updates to the building. Bernie Sanders earmarked $3,451,000 in funds in the 2023 omnibus bill specifically for the Barre Municipal Auditorium.
