= Twin City Ballers =

- Founded: July 2006
- Dissolved: February/March 2007
- League: ABA
- Based in: Benton Harbor, Michigan (-December 2006); Traveling team (January 2007-)
- Arena: Farnum Gym
- Colors: Maroon, gold
- Owner: Sydney Brooks
- Head coach: Johnell Williams

The Twin City Ballers were an American Basketball Association franchise that played in Benton Harbor, Michigan in 2006.

== History ==
The ABA expansion franchise, who would be based in Benton Harbor, Michigan but also claim "twin city" St. Joseph as home, was announced during a July 2006 new conference by owner Sidney Brooks (a travel agency owner in Chicago). The squad was assembled with a series of tryout camps in October, with a number of former Benton Harbor High School alumni selected for the team, such as Robert Whaley, Correy Childs, Prentice McGruder, Curtis McFall, Derek Weaver and Bryan Doss, with Peter Jackson as coach and Corey Sterling as general manager. The Twin City Ballers played their first ever game on 7 November 2006, beating the Peoria Kings 117–110 at home. The team reportedly drew "about 800" for each of its first three home games in Benton Harbour High School's Farnum Gym but the numbers dwindled rapidly (with an announced paying crowd of 65 for a late December game) and the team struggled financially after not securing sponsors (a reported $60,000 deal with Whirlpool Corporation did not come to fruition, allegedly because of poor attendance). Those financial problems led Brooks to lower the player's salaries (of between $175 and $300 per game) to $100 per game, with players quitting in response which saw the Ballers play a game on 30 December with only eight players. The organisation then cancelled a number of games and went on hiatus, training in Chicago's Lindbloom Park whilst Brooks looked to leave Benton Harbour (citing the lack of a local following) to move to Coloma, Michigan as the Southwest Michigan Ballers, nearly all the players (including all those from Benton Harbour High School), Peter Jackson and Corey Sterling had left and Jackson's assistant Johnell Williams was named as the new coach. The Coloma School Board ultimately refused to allow the team to use Coloma High School's gym, with the Ballers - who only had Remington Stewart and Quinnel Brown left from the initial roster - then playing all their games away, travelling by bus to Quebec City to play and lose two games in early February 2007. Though Brooks announced plans to play in Coloma, Covert or Watervliet in 2007–08, the team folded soon after, finishing its incomplete 2006–07 season with a 6–19 record.
