= Mid-Michigan Destroyers =

- Founded: 2009
- League: Premier Basketball League
- Team history: Mid-Michigan Destroyers (2009)
- Based in: Bay City, Michigan
- Arena: Bay City Western High School gymnasium
- Colors: Lake blue, battleship grey, white
- President: Jere Shockey
- Head coach: TJ Newsham
- Championships: 0

The Mid-Michigan Destroyers were a franchise in the Premier Basketball League which began play in the 2009 season. Based in Bay City, they trained at the JJKN Hoops Training Center (formerly the historic St. Joe's Gymnasium) but played at the Bay City Western high school gymnasium.

The Destroyers tried to form strong rivalries with their fellow PBL teams in Michigan, the Detroit Panthers and the Battle Creek Knights, however two thirds of the way through their inaugural season, there was a split among the members of the ownership group and the team suspended operations for at least 2009, if not permanently. The league also said the remaining Mid-Michigan games on the schedule would be filled by the remaining teams in the league.

== 2009 Season Schedule ==
Date	Opponent	Home/Away	Score	High points	High rebounds	High assists	Location/Attendance	Record
January 3	Detroit Panthers	Away	109-114	Odgra Bobo (31)	Luke Lloyd (18)	Troy Coleman (4)	Groves High School	0-1
January 10	Detroit Panthers	Home	107-102	Troy Coleman (20)	Luke Lloyd (11)	Oscar Sanders (4)	Western High School	0-2
January 11	Augusta Groove	Home	145-129	Odgra Bobo (35)	Luke Lloyd (13)	Luke Lloyd (8)	Western High School	0-3
January 23	Chicago Throwbacks	Home	105-116	Marcus Skinner (28)	Luke Lloyd (15)	Luke Lloyd (4)	Western High School	1-3
January 24	Battle Creek Knights	Home	120-116	Odgra Bobo (30)	Luke Lloyd (15)	Troy Coleman (5)	Western High School	1-4
January 26	Chicago Throwbacks	Away	117-104	Chuck Reed (34)	Luke Lloyd (20)	Luke Lloyd (7)	Attack Athletics	2-4
January 29	Rochester Razorsharks	Home	119-82	Odgra Bobo (26)	Luke Lloyd (6)	Eugene Seals (1)	Western High School	2-5
January 31	Augusta Groove	Away	119-125	Oscar Sanders & Odgra Bobo (26)	Luke Lloyd (19)	Luke Lloyd (2)	Richmond Academy	2-6
February 7	Rochester Razorsharks	Away	86-141	Odgra Bobo (28)	Melvin White (12)	Kendrick Cornelius (4)	Blue Cross Arena	2-7
February 13	Chicago Throwbacks	Away	108-121	Odgra Bobo (24)	Luke Lloyd (14)	Luke Lloyd (5)	Attack Athletics	2-8
February 19	Battle Creek Knights	Away	111-131	Odgra Bobo (25)	Melvin White & Anthony Stewart (10)	Antonio Jones, Justin Blevins, Kendrick Cornelius & Odgra Bobo (2)	Kellogg Arena	2-9
February 21	Rochester Razorsharks	Away	110-123	Odgra Bobo (28)	Anthony Stewart & Odgra Bobo (7)	Kendrick Cornelius (5)	Blue Cross Arena	2-10
February 22	Detroit Panthers	Home	118-103	Odgra Bobo (18)	Frank Cojcaj (7)	Odgra Bobo (5)	Western High School	2-11
