= Western Mass Zombies =

- Founded: 2016
- Folded: 2023
- League: East Coast Basketball League (2021–2023); American Basketball Association (2016–2018)
- Division: Mid-Atlantic
- Based in: Springfield, Massachusetts
- Arena: South End Community Center (2021–2023); Springfield Technical Community College (2017–2018); Agawam High School (2017–2018); Naismith Memorial Basketball Hall of Fame (2016–2017)
- Owner: Zach Baru
- Head coach: Brian Stasaitis
- Championships: 0
- Playoff berths: 1
- Dancers: Sting Dance Team

The Western Mass Zombies were a franchise in the East Coast Basketball League, playing in the Mid-Atlantic Conference. Based in Springfield, Massachusetts, the team began play in the 2016-17 American Basketball Association season as the Springfield Sting. During the team's inaugural season, the Sting played their home games at the Naismith Memorial Basketball Hall of Fame. The team had split home venues between Springfield Technical Community College and Agawam High School. The move allowed the Sting to offer more capacity for fans, as the crowds surrounding the court at the Basketball Hall of Fame were often an issue for the Sting in their inaugural season.

== History ==
The team name was announced the Springfield Sting on July 22, 2016, at a press conference in Downtown Springfield, Massachusetts on the steps of City Hall. The owner is Springfield-area teacher Zach Baru. Baru was joined by Mayor Domenic Sarno, Senator Eric Lesser (D - Longmeadow), Representative Carlos Gonzalez (D - Springfield), City Council President Michael Fenton and City Councilor Kateri Walsh.

During the initial press conference, Steve Sobel was announced as the franchise's first general manager and head coach, who previously was involved with the last minor league basketball team in Springfield - the Springfield Armor.

On October 25, 2016, the team announced its roster with several notable local players and former NCAA talent, including former 7'0'' UConn center Charles Okwandu.

=== 2016–2017 season ===
On November 5, 2016, the team tipped off its inaugural season at the Naismith Memorial Basketball Hall of Fame against the New Jersey Express, where they won 128–116 in front of a sold-out crowd. Additional sold out standing room only seating had to be added, and fans lined the court several rows deep.

Roosevelt Lee led the team with 37 points. Later on the Springfield Sting defeated the New York Court Kings 118–103 to improve the team's record to 3–1. On March 5, 2017; the team earned a slot in the post-season in their inaugural season after defeating New England 154-117 and finishing the regular season 11–3.

The Sting finished the season as the No. 2 seed in the Northeast Division. To allow for additional seating during the playoffs, home playoff games were played at Agawam High School in Agawam, Massachusetts. The Sting hosted the New York Court Kings in the first round of the 2016-17 ABA Playoffs game on March 11, 2017. The Sting advanced to the second round, thanks to Jerry Buchanon having a great game, posting 43 points, while Roosevelt Lee added 30. In the next evening's second-round game, the Sting defeated the Poughkeepsie-area based Atlantic Coast Cardinals 146–126 to reach the ABA Northeast Division Final. Roosevelt Lee lead the Sting again with 48 points.

=== 2017–2018 season ===
The Springfield Sting announced their second ABA season will tip off on the road on Dec. 2 at Worcester and will run through Feb. 25 at New England. Brian Stasaitis was named the franchise's second head coach. Stasaitis also serves as the head varsity girls basketball coach at W.F. Kaynor Technical High School in Waterbury, Connecticut.

The Sting announced they will split home venues during the 2017–18 season between Springfield Technical Community College and Agawam High School. The move will allow the Sting to offer more capacity for fans, as the crowds surrounding the court at the Basketball Hall of Fame were often an issue for the Sting last year.

In July 2018 the Sting were sold and the team became the Western Mass. Zombies.

== Past history statistics ==
=== Season by season ===
Season	League	Division	Finish	Wins	Losses	Pct.	Postseason Results
Springfield Sting
2016-2017	ABA	Northeast	2nd	11	3	.786	Lost in Northeast Division Final
Regular season				11	3	.786	2016–present
Playoffs				2	1	.667	2016–present

=== Coaches ===
Note: Statistics are correct through the end of the 2016-17 season.

Name	Term^{[b]}	GC	W	L	Win%	GC	W	L	Win%	Achievements/Notes
Name	Term^{[b]}	Regular season				Playoffs				Achievements/Notes
All-Time	2016–present	14	11	3	.786	3	2	1	.667	
Steve Sobel	2016-17	14	11	3	.786	3	2	1	.667	9-0 at home during regular season Reached Northeast Division Final
Brian Stasaitis	2017–present	0	0	0	.000	0	0	0	.000	

=== Notable players ===
On October 25, 2016, the Sting announced former 7'0'' UConn center Charles Okwandu would be joining the team.
