= Music City Stars =

- Founded: 2008
- League: American Basketball Association
- Team history: 2008–2010
- Based in: Nashville, Tennessee
- Arena: Allen Arena
- Colors: red, white, light blue, and dark blue
- Owner: Anthony Chase
- Head coach: Jan van Breda Kolff
- Championships: 0
- Cheerleaders: The Starletts
- Website: NashvilleBroncs.com

The Music City Stars, formerly known as the Nashville Broncs, was an expansion team in the American Basketball Association (ABA) that played from 2008 to 2010. Located in Nashville, Tennessee, the team was named for the city's association with music industry celebrities; it also referred the Music City Star (now known as the WeGo Star, a commuter rail service. They played the home games of their inaugural season at Nashville Municipal Auditorium, but played at Lipscomb University's Allen Arena for the 2009–10 season. The team ceased operations on January 29, 2010, citing poor ticket sales.

== Team history ==
The team, when owned by Scott Lumley, was known as the Nashville Broncs during their inaugural 2008 to 2009 season. That year, they finished with a 23–4 record, making it as far as the semifinals before being eliminated. In July 2009, the team changed ownership and its name to the Music City Stars. After playing only 12 games of the 2009–10 season (many games were cancelled due to teams leaving the league), the Stars shut down operations due to lagging ticket sales.

== Season-by-season record ==
Season	W	L	%	Playoffs
2008–09	23	4	.852	Won quarterfinals vs. Jersey Express; Lost semifinals vs. Maywood Buzz
2009–10*	9	3	.750	—
*The Stars suspended operations on January 29, 2010.
