= Bluegrass Stallions =

Former Premier Basketball League Basketball Team

- Founded: 2009
- League: ABA (2009–2010); PBL (2010–2011)
- Team history: Bluegrass Stallions (2009–2011)
- Based in: Georgetown, Kentucky
- Arena: Davis-Reid Alumni Gymnasium at Georgetown College
- Colors: Blue, white, red
- Head coach: Jaron Brown
- Dancers: Lady Stallions
- Mascot: HOOPS

The Bluegrass Stallions were a basketball team in the Premier Basketball League. They debuted in the American Basketball Association in 2009–10. The Stallions' first head coach was Kyle Macy, a former Kentucky Wildcats three-time All-American college basketball player.

== 2009-2010 season ==
Based in Lexington, Kentucky, the Stallions began playing at the indoor arena at the Kentucky Horse Park, but moved home games in January 2010 first to Corbin, KY and then to Lexington Christian Academy high school gymnasium due to conflicts with Horse Park management. They finished their turbulent inaugural season by losing in the playoff semifinals, and placing guard Bobby Perry as second team and center Lukasz Obrzut as third team all-ABA.

== 2010-2011 season ==
After the season, the Stallions attempted to form the Basketball Federation of America after a dispute with the ABA, where Stallions then-owner Tony Chase stated "The ABA will still exist, but I do not intend to be a part of that disorganized league next year. That is why this league has been formed." However, Chase sold his interest in the team to his partners, joined the PBL as CEO and the Stallions went with him to the new league. The team moved their home games to Georgetown College, in Georgetown, Kentucky.

On 19 April 2011, in a post on the forums about basketball at the "Our Sports Central" website, a poster who had previously been identified as the Bluegrass Stallions's Tony Chase stated that the Stallions had formally withdrawn from the league privately earlier.
