= Bahama All-Pro Show =

- League: ABA 2007–2009, 2012–2013
- Founded: 2007
- Folded: 2013
- History: Bahama Pro Show 2007–2009, 2012–2013
- Arena: Loyola Hall
- Location: New Providence, The Bahamas (namesake); Miami, Florida (headquartered)
- Team colors: light blue, yellow, black
- Head coach: James Price
- Ownership: Ricardo Smith

The Bahama All-Pro Show were a basketball team representing The Bahamas, and playing their home games in Miami, Florida, U.S. They played sporadically in the new American Basketball Association (ABA) beginning in the 2007–08 season. The team was intended as a showcase for Bahamian players, and organizers hoped to eventually play home games in the Bahamas. However internal instability caused the team to miss many of its games and suspend operations after the 2008–2009 season.

== History ==
The Bahama All-Pro Show originated in 2006, when Bahamian basketball promoter Ricardo Smith attempted to start a professional organization for basketball teams in the Bahamas, the Bahama Pro Show. This enterprise struggled in the Bahamas, and Smith approached the American Basketball Association in the United States about reorganizing the Pro Show as a team in the ABA. In 2007 the ABA announced that the "Bahama All-Pro Show" would be joining the league for the upcoming season.

The Bahama All-Pro Show was based in Miami, Florida. The team was Bahamian owned and featured some Bahamian players and coaches, and the organization hoped to eventually play its home games in the Bahamas. However, financial problems and instability plagued the team throughout its short history, and the All-Pro Show managed to play only a few games during its first two seasons, and was inactive in the 2009-2010 season. They were included in the ABA's team list and schedule for the 2010–2011 season, but did not play any games. Again in 2012, they announced that they were returning, but then disappeared quickly afterwards without playing a game.

== See also ==
- Battle 4 Atlantis
- The Islands of the Bahamas Showcase
- Miami Majesty
