= Knoxville Noise =

- League: ABA 2006–07
- Founded: 2006
- Folded: 2007
- History: Knoxville Noise; 2006–07
- Arena: Knoxville Catholic High School gym
- Location: Knoxville, Tennessee
- Team colors: red, white, blue
- Ownership: Gavin Raiteri

The Knoxville Noise was a franchise of the World Basketball Association in Knoxville, Tennessee. The Noise were owned by Suki Sports Corporation. Suki Sports CEO Gavin Raiteri and President Ashley Raiteri established the franchise in April 2006. The team owners held a contest at sukisports.com to decide the name of the team to be located in Knoxville. Trina Williams had the winning entry with her name, the Knoxville Noise. The team had the first of several try-out camps in late April. Players were to be called back to participate in Noise summer basketball events, with the opportunity to make the final camp in November.

On October 11, 2006, it was announced that the Noise planned to play in the World Basketball Association for the spring/summer part of the year, while remaining in the ABA for the fall/winter part. On January 7, 2007, the Noise announced they were leaving the ABA and focusing their efforts on the upcoming WBA season. However, the team never played a game in the WBA.
