= Louisiana Soul =

Semi-professional basketball team

- Founded: 2013
- League: PBL (2013); IBA (2014); ABA (2014); UBA (2014-15)
- Team history: Lafayette Legends (2013-14); Louisiana Soul (2014-2015)
- Based in: Lafayette, Louisiana
- Arena: Northside High School
- Colors: red, black
- Owner: Kevin Williams
- Head coach: Kevin Williams
- Championships: 0

The Louisiana Soul were a semi-professional basketball team playing in the Universal Basketball Association (UBA). Established in 2013 the team was originally known as the Lafayette Legends, changing names in July 2014.

== History ==
The Legends played their first exhibition game in preparation for the Premier Basketball League (PBL) season on December 14, 2013. Played at Northside High School in Lafayette, the Legends were 155-81 winners against a team from Lake Charles (Louisiana). The Legends never played an official PBL game.

A second exhibition was played on February 8, 2014, against the Shizuoka Gymrats, a travel-team who compete in the ABA. Lafayette were victorious 104–101. Two more exhibitions followed on March 29 and May 3 as the team made preparations to compete as a "branding team" in the Independent Basketball Association (IBA) 2014 Fall season.

On July 10, 2014, the franchise changed its name to Louisiana Soul, as the IBA already had a "Legends" team (Schenectady Legends). The Soul were scheduled for four IBA games, but did not compete in any official IBA game.

The American Basketball Association (ABA) was next for the Soul, and on November 9, 2014, played their first "official" league game, losing to the Texas Fuel 119–109.

On December 6, 2014, the Soul took park in a Universal Basketball Association (UBA) draft. The team website lists a UBA schedule set to begin in January 2015.

The Soul completed the full 2015 UBA schedule going 1–12 to finish sixth (of six teams) in the Western Conference. Their record was 20th-best in the 21-team league.

== Season-by-season record ==
| Season | W | L | Finish | Playoff Result |
|---|---|---|---|---|
| 2013-14 PBL | 0 | 0 | | Never played in PBL. |
| 2014 Fall IBA | 0 | 0 | | Never played in IBA. |
| 2014-15 ABA | 0 | 1 | | Played one ABA game. |
| 2015 UBA | 1 | 12 | 6th (of 6) Western Conference | DNQ |
| Totals | 1 | 13 | | -- |
