= Rockford Fury =

- Founded: 2006
- Folded: 2008
- League: PBL (2008)
- Team history: Hammond Rollers (2006); Sauk Valley Rollers (2006–2007); Rockford Fury (2008)
- Based in: Rockford, Illinois
- Arena: Seaver Gymnasium, Rockford College
- Championships: 0

The Rockford Fury was a basketball team based in Rockford, Illinois, that played in the Premier Basketball League (PBL) in 2008.

== History ==
The franchise began as the Hammond Rollers in the American Basketball Association (ABA). In December 2006, Quad City Riverhawks owner Tom McGinn purchased the team, renamed it the Sauk Valley Rollers, and based it in the Sterling–Rock Falls area of Illinois.

By February 2008, the team was competing as the Rockford Fury in the PBL and playing its home games at Seaver Gymnasium at Rockford College.

The Fury folded in the summer of 2008 after the PBL adopted a rule barring one owner from holding more than one franchise.
