= Detroit Panthers (PBL) =

American minor-league basketball team

- League: ABA (2000–2006); PBL; 2006-2009,2022; Pro Basketball Association; 2021
- Founded: 2000
- History: Detroit Dogs: (2000–2002); Detroit Wheels: (2004–2006); Detroit Panthers:(2006–2009, 2021–present)
- Arena: Groves High School (2,500)
- Location: Beverly Hills, Michigan
- Team colors
- Championships: 1,1

The Detroit Panthers are an American minor-league basketball team in the Maximum Basketball League. Formerly a member of the American Basketball Association, the team was previously known as the Detroit Dogs and the Detroit Wheels. The Panthers were one of the charter franchises of the ABA and won the league's first championship as the Detroit Dogs.

== History ==
=== 2000–2002: Detroit Dogs ===
Initially founded in 2000 as one of the new ABA's charter franchises, the Detroit Dogs quickly became one of the league's better teams. Their first coach was Detroit's own George Gervin, a star with the original ABA in the 1970s. The Dogs finished with a 24–20 record and the best record in the Eastern Division, facing the Tampa Bay ThunderDawgs in the first round of the playoffs. After trailing for most of the game, Detroit rallied and won 117–112, moving to the second round. In the semifinals, Detroit handled the Indiana Legends 119–105, and advanced to the new ABA's first championship game against the heavily favored Chicago Skyliners, owners of a 31–12 record. Detroit would get off to a fast start and easily defeat the Skyliners, 107–91. Gee Gervin (George's son), who led the team during the regular season, won the first-ever ABA Championship Game MVP Award.

During their second season, 2001–02, the Detroit Dogs struggled as a team, losing five games in a row at one point. A late-season rally gave the Dogs an 11–17 record, good enough for fourth place and a playoff spot. The Phoenix Eclipse promptly eliminated Detroit, 112–97.

=== 2003–2006: Detroit Wheels ===
For the 2002–03 season, the ABA took the year off, but returned in the 2003–04 season. In an effort to rebrand themselves, the Detroit Dogs renamed themselves the Detroit Wheels, as a reference to the car-building industry that made the city famous. The Wheels struggled both on and off the court, with several games cancelled due to an inability to secure arena dates (a common problem in the ABA). Detroit managed to play just 12 games and finished with a losing record at 4–8. In 2004–05, they finished with the same record, missing the playoffs for two consecutive years.

In 2005–2006, the "wheels" officially came off for Detroit, as they endured the worst season in their history, thanks to various injuries to key players. A long losing streak deposited the Wheels into last place in the Freddie Lewis Division with a 6–17 record. After another losing season and no playoffs, the Wheels were ready to reinvent themselves yet again.

=== 2006–2007: Detroit Panthers ===
As the Detroit Panthers, the team turned things around as they went on a six-game winning streak during the 2006–07 regular season. The Panthers, led by 6'6" guard, Tyrone Mack, finished with a 16–10 record, taking the North Division title, and gearing up for a championship run. In the playoffs, they were slated to face the Peoria Kings in Detroit on March 14, 2007. In a press release, the league stated that Detroit was one of five teams that qualified for the playoffs but chose not to compete for what league CEO Joe Newman called "valid acceptable reasons. The "Detroit Panthers" official Disc Jockey was Chip Pepitone, better known as "DJ Gemini"

=== 2007: Off year ===
After giving up their playoff season, the Detroit Panthers suspended operations for the 2007–08 season, and eventually dropped out of the ABA

=== 2008–2009: Going to the PBL ===
In the spring of 2008, the team joined the Premier Basketball League for the 2009 season. The Panthers went 6–14. In October 2009, the Panthers announced they'd be sitting out the 2010 PBL season. They would not return.

=== Returning to the PBL ===
In February 2021, under new ownership of Cecil L. Hood, the Panthers joined the Pro Basketball Association. In fall of 2021 the team rejoined the Premier Basketball League for the 2022 season.

== Season-by-season records ==
=== ABA ===
- 2000–2001: 24–20, W 1st rd. Tampa Bay 117–112, W 2nd rd. Indiana 119–105, W Finals Chicago 107–91
- 2001–2002: 11–17, L 1st round Phoenix 112–97
- 2002–2003: did not play
- 2003–2004: 4–8, missed playoffs
- 2004–2005: 4–8, missed playoffs
- 2005–2006: 6–17, missed playoffs
- 2006–2007: 16–10, did not participate in playoffs
- 2007–2008: did not play

=== PBL ===
- 2008–2009: 6–14
- 2021–2022: 5–2, L 1st round Lancaster 104–99

=== MBL ===
- 2022–2023: 3–6, missed playoffs

== Final roster ==
Head Coach: Terry Sare

#		Pos.	Ht.	Player	Acquired	College
1	(United States)	PG	5'11	Giovanni Riley	2008	Wisconsin-Whitewater
3	(United States)	PG	6'0	Brian Woodland	2008	Henderson State
5	(United States)	PF	6'8	Willie Mitchell	2008	Alabama-Birmingham
10	(United States)	SF	6'7	David Myers	2008	Michigan
11	(United States)	PG	6'2	Reginald Riley	2008	Newman
14	(United States)	SF	6'6	Tyrone Mack	2008	Northwestern
22	(United States)	SG	6'3	Kyle Johnson	2008	Wisconsin
23	(United States)	SF	6'5	Jasen Hunt	2008	Central State
30	(United States)	SG	6'4	Micah Kirstein	2008	St. Francis (IL)
33	(United States)	SG	6'5	Stane's Bufford	2008	Western Michigan
44	(United States)	C	6'6	Corey Gupton	2008	Park
45	(United States)	C	6'9	Justin Fiori	2008	Schoolcraft

== 2009 season schedule ==
Date	Opponent	Home/Away	Score	High points	High rebounds	High assists	Location/Attendance	Record
January 3	Mid-Michigan Destroyers	Home	109-114	Brian Woodland (27)	Brian Woodland & David Myers (7)	Reginald Riley (5)	Groves High School	1-0
January 4	Chicago Throwbacks	Home	110-106	Corey Gupton (22)	Stane's Bufford (9)	Brian Woodland & Micah Kirstein (5)	Groves High School	1-1
January 10	Mid-Michigan Destroyers	Away	107-102	Stane's Bufford (26)	Willie Mitchell (8)	Brian Woodland (7)	Bay City Western High School	2-1
January 17	Battle Creek Knights	Away	101-109	Stane's Bufford (26)	Willie Mitchell (10)	Brian Woodland (4)	Kellogg Arena	2-2
January 18	Chicago Throwbacks	Away	107-119	James Head (17)	James Head (10)	Giovanni Riley (3)	Attack Athletics	2-3
January 24	Augusta Groove	Home	131-115	Stane's Bufford (27)	Willie Mitchell (10)	Giovanni Riley (9)	Groves High School	2-4
January 31	Battle Creek Knights	Home	119-106	Brian Woodland (20)	James Head (9)	Brian Woodland (8)	Groves High School	2-5
February 8	Chicago Throwbacks	Home	114-113	Stane's Bufford (28)	Chuck Bailey (8)	Randy Gill (7)	Groves High School	2-6
February 13	Halifax Rainmen	Away	89-100	Stane's Bufford (22)	Chuck Bailey (13)	Randy Gill (11)	Halifax Metro Centre	2-7
February 15	Wilmington Sea Dawgs	Away	95-101	Stane's Bufford (27)	Chuck Bailey (13)	Randy Gill (3)	Schwartz Center	2-8
February 20	Battle Creek Knights	Away	133-143	Randy Gill (35)	Chuck Bailey (14)	Randy Gill (5)	Kellogg Arena	2-9
February 22	Mid-Michigan Destroyers	Away	118-103	Chuck Bailey (30)	Walter Waters (17)	Brian Woodland (10)	Western High School	3-9
February 28	Battle Creek Knights	Home	108-110	Randy Gill (35)	Chuck Bailey (15)	Randy Gill (14)	Groves High School	4-9
March 6	Chicago Throwbacks	Away	123-116	Brian Woodland (30)	Randy Gill (5)	Randy Gill (3)	Attack Athletics	5-9
March 8	Montreal Sasquatch	Home	115-119	Stane's Bufford (26)	Michael Manciel & Walter Waters (13)	Stane's Bufford (6)	Groves High School	6-9
March 15	Augusta Groove	Home	136-132	Walter Waters (28)	Walter Waters (15)	Brian Woodland & Randy Gill (7)	Groves High School	6-10
March 21	Augusta Groove	Away	119-123	Brian Woodland (45)	Michael Manciel (12)	Oscar Sanders (5)	Richmond Academy	6-11
March 22	Wilmington Sea Dawgs	Home*	110-91	Stane's Bufford (29)	Walter Waters (12)	Michael Manciel & Brian Woodland (3)	Brunswick Community College	6-12
March 28	Wilmington Sea Dawgs	Home	107-103	Stane's Bufford (31)	Walter Waters (11)	Brian Woodland (6)	Groves High School	6-13
March 29	Wilmington Sea Dawgs	Home	121-104	Brian Woodland (41)	Walter Waters (16)	Stane's Bufford (9)	Groves High School	6-14

* Both Wilmington and Detroit need to make up a game, so Detroit is home for the game although it will be played very near Wilmington's home gym.
