= California HeatWave =

Professional minor league basketball team based in Madera, California, United States

- Founded: 2003; 23 years ago
- League: ABA
- Team history: Fresno Heatwave (2003-06); Sacramento Heatwave (2006-13); California Heatwave (2013-14)
- Based in: Madera, California
- Arena: Liberty High School
- Colors: Orange and White
- Owner: Reggie Davis; Greg Chambers
- Head coach: Reggie Davis
- Championships: 0
- Cheerleaders: Heatwave Dance Team
- Dancers: Jasmine Huntsman

The California Heatwave was a professional basketball team in the American Basketball Association (ABA) team based in Madera, California. The team began play in the fall of 2003 at Selland Arena in Fresno, California. The founder of the Fresno Heatwave was Albert Ellis and Richard Hanna. The Fresno Heatwave was coached by Sean Higgins, and its vice president was Janine Nkosi.

Originally, the team was called the Fresno Heat, but it was renamed Fresno Heatwave to avoid brand confusion with the National Basketball Association's Miami Heat.

== History ==
On December 3, 2006, the team officially moved to Sacramento, California and became the Sacramento Heatwave. They played at Natomas H.S. Event Center before settling at Cosumnes River College.

They team moved to play at Folsom High School northeast of Sacramento before settling at West Campus High School in Sacramento.

On October 28, 2013, the Heatwave moved to Madera, California (25 miles northwest of Fresno) and changed its name to the California Heatwave.

In November 2014 team owner Reggie Davis announced that the Heatwave was ceasing operations immediately.
