= Quad City Riverhawks =

- League: ABA 2006–07; PBL 2007–08
- Founded: 2006
- History: 2006–08
- Arena: Wharton Field House
- Location: Moline, Illinois
- Team colors: red, orange, black
- Head coach: james A Condill
- Ownership: Tom McGinn

The Quad City Riverhawks were a team of the Premier Basketball League that previously played in the modern American Basketball Association (ABA).

== History ==
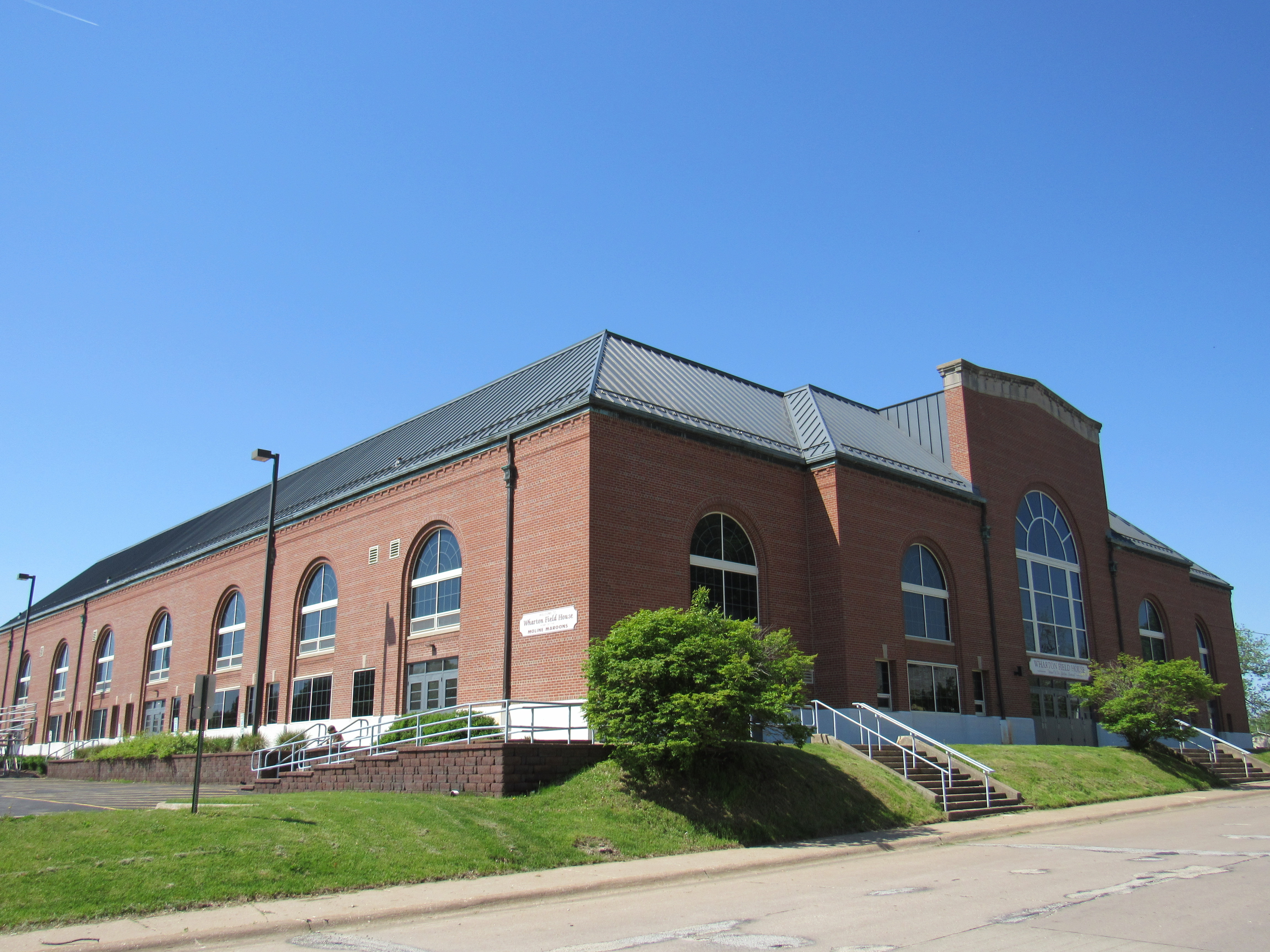
The Riverhawks played at Wharton Field House during their final season (2007–08)

The team began play as a member of the ABA in 2006. The team played at the Activities Center at Marycrest College in Davenport, Iowa.

Finishing second place in the White Central division with a 24–9 record, the 'Hawks earned the #9 seed in the ABA Playoffs, defeating their brother franchise, the Sauk Valley Rollers in the first round by a score of 100–86, and then scoring a forfeit win over Central division champion Minnesota Ripknees (who had decided not to play in the playoffs due to a monetary dispute). The 'Hawks would lose to eventual ABA runner-up Texas Tycoons in the quarterfinals by a score of 125–123.

The Riverhawks changed venues to the Wharton Field House in Moline, Illinois (former home to the NBA's Tri-Cities Blackhawks and later the CBA's Quad City Thunder), and changed their affiliation to the Premier Basketball League along with their brother franchise, the Rock River Fury. They had a successful season on the court, winning the regular season PBL West title.

Due to venue issues, the Riverhawks elected to take the 2008–2009 PBL season off.

== See also ==
- Quad City Eagles
- Quad City Mallards
