= Gallup Talons =

- Founded: 2005
- League: ABA 2005-present
- Team history: Gallup Talons; 2005-2006, 2008-present Gallup Outlaws; 2006-2007
- Based in: Gallup, New Mexico
- Arena: Gallup Junior High School
- Colors: Teal, gold, black
- Owner: Joe Kolb
- Head coach: Kelvin Scarborough
- Championships: 0
- Cheerleaders: Talons Dancers

The Gallup Talons were an American Basketball Association (ABA) team based in Gallup, New Mexico. The team began play in the fall of 2005, and was announced as a Native American team; however, the team released its last Native American player in January 2006. The team started off 10-0, losing its eleventh game to the Southern California Legends.

Opting out of the 2005-06 playoffs, the team was transferred from former owner Joe Kolb to Debra Money and was renamed the Gallup Outlaws for the 2006-07 season, to much less successful results. After taking the '07-'08 season off, the team announced they were returning for the '08-'09 season, with Kolb back as owner, and the team going back to the Talons nickname. New Mexico Lobos men's basketball alumnus Kelvin Scarborough will serve as head coach for the resurrected Talons.
