= Miami Majesty =

- Leagues: ABA 2005–2006; CBA 2006–2007
- Founded: 2005
- Folded: 2007
- History: Florida Pit Bulls; 2005–2006; Miami Majesty; 2006–2007
- Arena: BankAtlantic Center; 2005–2006
- Location: Miami-Dade County, Florida
- Team colors: red, blue, gold
- Head coach: Tim Hardaway
- Ownership: Demetrius Ford; Frank Rosso; Tim Hardaway
- Championships: 0

The Miami Majesty was a team of the Continental Basketball Association based in Miami-Dade County, Florida.

The team was formerly the Florida Pit Bulls, a member of the American Basketball Association, and played their home games in the BankAtlantic Center in Sunrise, Florida. The team, coached by Miami Heat legend Tim Hardaway (who also part-owned and played for the team, hoping to go back to playing for the Miami Heat someday), compiled a record of 19-8 (good for first place in the Barnes-Malone division) in the regular season, despite hurricanes cancelling games and almost wiping out their division. However, the team decided not to go to the playoffs and instead left the ABA. They had applied for membership in the NBA Development League, to be the Heat's affiliate, but the D-League turned them down. The team announced they would be playing in the CBA and would not be returning to the BankAtlantic Center.

The team had reached an agreement with the BankUnited Center in Coral Gables, Florida, but at the last minute the University of Miami turned the team down (over fear of interfering with University of Miami Hurricanes games), so the team decided to resume play in 2007. The team announced they were changing their name to the Miami Majesty, because of a desire to disassociate themselves from the ABA, and also because it is illegal to own a pit bull in Miami-Dade County.

However, the team never competed in the CBA as the Miami Majesty, and instead moved to Pikeville, Kentucky, where they played as the East Kentucky Miners of the CBA for the 2007-08 season before rejoining the American Basketball Association for the 2008-09 season.
