= Atlanta Vision =

- League: ABA 2004–2009
- Founded: 2004
- Folded: 2009
- History: Atlanta Mustangs; 2004; Atlanta Vision; 2004–2009
- Arena: Gwinnett County
- Location: Gwinnett County, Georgia (Atlanta)
- Team colors: red, black white
- Ownership: Quentin Townsend
- Championships: 0

The Atlanta Vision was an American Basketball Association (ABA) team based in Atlanta. The team began play in the fall of 2004. They finished the 2005 season with a 7–14 record, which was not good enough to make the playoffs. However, in the 2005–06 season, they finished 23–7, which was good enough for first place in the Barnes-Malone division over Tim Hardaway's Florida Pit Bulls. They also made it to the ABA's Great 8 tournament at the Blue Cross Arena in Rochester, New York, losing in the quarterfinals to the host team, the Rochester Razorsharks. The Vision won a divisional title in 2008.

== Lawsuit ==
In September 2008, Atlanta Vision owner Quentin Townsend was sued by former partners Carter Patterson and Brian Richey, alleging that Townsend defrauded them while purporting to pursue an affiliation with the NBA Development League. In November 2008, he was also charged with a criminal count of theft by deception. Later that month he reached a settlement on the civil charges. The team has not played since the 2008–09 season.

== See also ==
- Augusta Groove
- Georgia Gwizzlies
- Savannah Spirits
