= Las Vegas Aces (ABA) =

Minor league men's baseball team

- Founded: 2006
- League: ABA 2005–2011
- Team history: Orlando Orange Men (2006 preseason); Orlando Aces (2006–2007); Las Vegas Aces (2008–2009); Las Vegas Dynasty (2009–2010); Las Vegas Aces (2010–2011)
- Based in: Las Vegas, Nevada
- Arena: Sports Center of Las Vegas
- Colors: Blue/White/Red
- Owner: Tim Hiddle
- Head coach: AstroVaporz
- Championships: 0

The Las Vegas Aces were a team in the modern American Basketball Association in Las Vegas, Nevada. They were originally based in Orlando, Florida and began play as the Orlando Aces in the Florida Division of the Blue Conference in the 2006–2007 season. They moved to Las Vegas, Nevada on March 14, 2008, after teams in the Blue Conference Florida Division failed to attend scheduled games forcing the Aces to exit the season early. Renamed the Las Vegas Aces, the team remained in good standing in the ABA.

On July 14, 2009, the Aces announced they were changing their name to the Las Vegas Dynasty. However, the new name never took and they continued playing as the Las Vegas Aces. For the 2009–2010 season, they made the playoffs with 3–0 record.

In July 2011, the Aces announced a move to Eatonville, Florida.
