= Jacksonville Jam =

- Founded: 2006
- League: ABA 2006-2007; PBL 2007 -2008
- Team history: Jacksonville Jam; 2006 - 2008
- Based in: Jacksonville, Florida
- Arena: University of North Florida Arena
- Colors: Red, Teal, Black
- Owner: Felix Krupczynski
- Head coach: Mike Gillespie
- Championships: 0
- Dancers: Lady Jam
- Mascot: Zo, Flex, Max, Izzy, Ziggy (The Jam Squad)

The Jacksonville Jam was a basketball team based in Jacksonville, Florida that was a member of the modern American Basketball Association and the Premier Basketball League. They played their home games at the University of North Florida. Thirteen of their eighteen home games were to be played on Friday nights, while the remainder were to be played on Sundays. The team planned to move to Veterans Memorial Arena for the 2008–2009 season, but it did not survive its transition into the PBL.

== 2006-07 ==
Their inaugural season began in November 2006 as an ABA expansion team. The team finished 25–8, good for the Southeast Division title and a #2 seed in the ABA tournament. Their tournament run would not last long, however, as the Jam lost in the round of 16 to the Buffalo Silverbacks by a score of 100–91.

== 2008 ==
The team announced they were joining the Premier Basketball League for the 2008 season. On February 4, 2008, the PBL announced they were running the Jacksonville entry. This came after a public dispute about payment to players and coaches by ownership. Some players remained with the PBL entry, now named the Jacksonville SLAM, leaving the name JAM with the owner. On February 6, the owner announced he was suspending operations.
