= Chicago Throwbacks =

Defunct basketball team in Chicago

- Founded: 2007
- League: ABA (2007); PBL (2008–2009)
- Team history: Chicago Throwbacks (2007–2009)
- Based in: Chicago, Illinois
- Arena: Attack Athletics
- Colors: Black, silver
- Owner: George Bellevue
- Championships: 0

The Chicago Throwbacks were a basketball team based in Chicago. The franchise began the 2007–08 season in the American Basketball Association (ABA) and moved to the Premier Basketball League (PBL) after two games. The Throwbacks played two PBL seasons at Attack Athletics on Chicago's West Side before not returning for the 2009–10 season.

== History ==
The Throwbacks were founded in 2007 by owner George Bellevue and planned to begin their inaugural ABA home schedule that November at Attack Athletics. After two games, they left the ABA in December 2007 because too few regional opponents remained and joined the newly formed PBL.

Coached by Donnie Boyce, Chicago finished 5–15 in the PBL's Western Division in 2008. The Throwbacks lost their opening playoff game to the Arkansas Impact, 115–102.

The PBL placed Chicago in its Central Division for 2009. Boyce resigned on February 15 to accept an assistant coaching position with the Reno Bighorns of the NBA Development League, and assistant Charles Scott was named interim head coach. The Throwbacks finished 6–14. They did not return for the PBL's 2009–10 season.

== Season-by-season record ==
Season	League	Division	Regular season	Playoffs
2008	PBL	Western	5–15	Lost first round, 102–115 vs. Arkansas Impact
2009	PBL	Central	6–14	—
