= Texas Tycoons =

- Founded: 2004
- League: ABA 2004-2008; WBA 2007-present
- Team history: Fort Worth Tycoons; 2004-2005; Texas Tycoons; 2005-present
- Based in: DeSoto, Texas
- Arena: DeSoto Town Center
- Colors: Green and gold
- Owner: Charles Key
- Head coach: Chris Terrell
- Championships: 0

The Texas Tycoons were a team of the American Basketball Association (ABA) and the World Basketball Association (WBA) based in Dallas. The team began play in the fall of 2004 based in Fort Worth. The Texas Tycoons played their 2007–08 season in DeSoto, Texas, at the DeSoto Recreation Center.

== History ==
They finished the 2005 season with a 17–9 record, and finished 2nd place in the White Division. They lost in the first round of the playoffs to the Bellevue Blackhawks 101–94.

On December 1, 2005, the Tycoons announced that they were leaving the ABA. A press release noted concerns that the team had discussed with the ABA office, but that they did not wish to disclose publicly. The Tycoons left with a 3–0 record, ranking third in the ABA's Power Sixteen.

However, it was announced later on that the Tycoons would return to the ABA for the 2006–07 season, along with the Houston Havoc. The team also announced that they were moving from Fort Worth to Dallas.

They also became the first ABA team to own their own arena, purchasing a former ice skating rink. Plans for the arena are unclear after the franchise's departure from Fort Worth.

On February 6, 2007, it was announced that the team was playing in the World Basketball Association for the spring part of the season, while remaining in the ABA for the fall/winter part.

On March 27, 2007, the team defeated Beijing Aoshen 126–114 in the final four. Texas with a record of 25-5 led minor league basketball in scoring with 132 ppg and with the win advanced to the ABA Finals for the first time in franchise history.

On March 29, 2007, the team lost to the Vermont Frost Heaves in the ABA Final.

The team did not compete in the 2008-2009 ABA season and is presumed folded.
