= Vermont Frost Heaves =

Professional minor league basketball team in Cornwall, Vermont, United States

- League: ABA 2005–08; PBL 2008–2011
- Founded: 2005
- Folded: 2011
- History: Vermont Frost Heaves; 2005–2011
- Arena: Barre Auditorium; Burlington Memorial Auditorium
- Location: Cornwall, Vermont
- Team colors: light blue, blue, white
- Head coach: Joe Salerno
- Ownership: GO Heaves, Inc.

The Vermont Frost Heaves were a professional basketball team in Vermont, United States, that last played in the Premier Basketball League, last coached by Joe Salerno.

== History ==
The formation of the team was announced in December 2005 by founding owner Alexander Wolff, a Cornwall, Vermont, resident and writer for Sports Illustrated. The Heaves were originally part of the American Basketball Association from 2006 through 2008. They were the ABA Champions in the 2006–07 and the 2007–2008 seasons, under head coach Will Voigt. The team is named for the frost heaving soil displacement known to affect colder climates.

The Heaves were formed in 2005, and started playing in the fall of 2006 at the Auditorium in Barre, Vermont, and the Memorial Auditorium in Burlington, Vermont.

The Heaves started off with a 108–100 overtime loss at Quebec City before going on a 5-game win streak with wins over Montreal, Buffalo, Quebec City, and Cape Cod(2). An overtime loss at Strong Island was followed by a seven-game win streak ended by Quebec City in Barre, the team's first-ever home loss. Attendance was between 900 and 1,650 for the games.

The team ended the regular season 30–6. On March 29, 2007, the Frost Heaves won the ABA Championship, defeating the Texas Tycoons 143–95.

In the 2010 off-season, a group of local fans bought the team, which had been on the verge of collapse, and established a non-profit fan-owned corporation named GO Heaves, Inc. to operate the team. However, on January 26, 2011 (in the midst of the season), GO Heaves announced the team was ceasing operations. Their players were subject to a dispersal draft.
