= Minnesota Ripknees =

Former American minor league basketball team

- Founded: 2006
- League: ABA (2006-07); PBL (2007); ABA (2007-08)
- Team history: 2006-2008
- Based in: St. Paul, Minnesota
- Arena: Roy Wilkins Auditorium
- Colors: Gold, blue, brown
- Owner: John Jurewicz (2006-07); Jam Entertainment (2007-08)
- Head coach: Larry A. McKenzie
- Championships: 0

The Minnesota Ripknees were an American basketball team of the American Basketball Association (ABA). The Ripknees briefly joined the Premier Basketball League after starting playing one season in the ABA.

The team gets its unusual name after "Ripknee", a character in stories (with a hole in the knee of his blue jeans) which former co-owner John Jurewicz used to tell his son, William (also a former co-owner) on long car trips. The team ceased operations after 2008.

== History ==
Playing their home games at the Gangelhoff Center, Minnesota finished their inaugural 2006–07 season 24–8, good for first place in their division. However, a financial dispute prevented the team from participating in the playoffs.

Jamel Staten of the Ripknees became the first and only player in ABA history to record a quadruple-double in their 125–107 victory over the St. Louis Stunners on February 1, 2007.

After the season, the team announced they would switch their affiliation to the Premier Basketball League and would now be playing at the Roy Wilkins Auditorium (which previously served as the alternate home of the Minneapolis Lakers) next to the Xcel Energy Center in St.Paul.

Before the Ripknees could ever take a shot in the PBL, they were sold to Jam Entertainment (owners of the Rochester Fire, Peoria Kings, and Rome Legions). The Ripknees returned to the ABA to play the 2007–08 season.

According to a report on Our Sports Central, the Ripknees ceased playing in the ABA before the end of the 2007–08 season.

== Players from Minnesota on the Ripknees ==
- Johnny Gilbert, Minneapolis Henry HS (2000) - University of Oklahoma
- Levi Jones, Minneapolis North HS (1999) - Minneapolis CTC and University of Nebraska-Omaha
- Mitch Ohnstad, Faribault HS (1996) - Cal Poly and University of Minnesota
- Lucas Olson-Patterson, Robbinsdale Cooper HS (2001) - Augsburg College
- Tyrell Sledge, Minneapolis Henry HS (2002) - Emporia State
- Jamel Staten, Minneapolis North HS (2001) - Minnesota State Mankato
