= 2012–13 ABA season =

- League: American Basketball Association
- Sport: Basketball
- Duration: October 26, 2012 – March 31, 2013

Regular season

2013 ABA Playoffs
- champions: Jacksonville Giants
- runners-up: South Carolina Warriors
- champions: North Dallas Vandals
- runners-up: Colorado Kings

2013 ABA Championship
- Champions: Jacksonville Giants
- Runners-up: North Dallas Vandals

ABA seasons
- ← 2011–12 2013–14 →

The 2012–13 ABA season is the 12th season of the American Basketball Association. The season began in late October 2012 and ended in March 2013. They playoffs were held in April 2013 with Jacksonville Giants winning the final four tournament.

== League Standings ==
These are the final league standings. The standings come from USBasket.

Atlantic South	W	L	Win %
Jacksonville Giants	27	1	0.962
Albany Shockwave	10	2	0.833
Atlanta Aliens	9	3	0.727
Gainesville Heat	8	5	0.583
Gulf Coast Flash	7	3	0.667
Georgia Gwizzlies	5	7	0.455
Atlanta Wildcats	4	4	0.500
Phenix City Bombers	4	4	0.500
Birmingham Blitz	3	5	0.375
Tampa Bay Rain	2	1	0.667
Southwest Fellowship Warriors	2	13	0.077
East Point Jaguars	1	2	0.333
Bahama All-Pro Show	0	6	0.000
California/Northwest Division	W	L	Win %
San Francisco Rumble	9	4	0.818
Bay Area Matrix	8	4	0.727
Central Valley Titans	3	7	0.125
Sacramento Heatwave	2	6	0.286
Port City Pirates	0	3	0.000
Colonial Division	W	L	Win %
Richmond Elite	11	2	0.846
Lynchburg Legends	5	8	0.385
Seven City Knights	3	5	0.375
Hampton Road Stallions	0	7	0.000
Mid-Atlantic Division	W	L	Win %
South Carolina Warriors	26	1	0.957
Greenville Galaxy	6	3	0.667
Fayetteville Flight	3	11	0.250
Palmetto State Rizers	3	6	0.333
Tennessee Halo's	1	1	0.500
Mid-Central Division	W	L	Win %
Lima Explosion	12	6	0.688
Chicago Steam	14	1	0.909
Detroit Hoops	8	2	0.800
Indiana State Warriors	6	2	0.750
Pontiac Firebirds	6	7	0.417
Michiana Monarchs	1	5	0.167
Oakland County Cowboys	0	8	0.000
Peoria Pride	0	3	0.000
Northeast Division	W	L	Win %
Jersey Express	8	3	0.778
Staten Island Vipers	3	2	0.500
Connecticut Topballerz	0	1	0.000
NYC Thunder	0	1	0.000
Pacific Northwest Division	W	L	Win %
Seattle Mountaineers	13	1	0.929
Calgary Crush	12	0	1.000
Alaska Quakes	8	1	0.889
Olympia Rise	6	8	0.428
Kitsap Admirals	2	14	0.133
Alaska 49ers	2	2	0.500
Salem Sabres	3	1	0.667
Lakewood Panthers	1	11	0.091
Washington Rampage	0	3	0.000
Rocky Mountain Division	W	L	Win %
Colorado Kings	13	3	0.857
Colorado Cougars	0	2	0.000
South Central Division	W	L	Win %
Conway Cyclones	12	3	0.846
Jackson Showboats	7	3	0.778
Missouri Rhythm	4	3	0.571
Bluff City Reign	1	7	0.125
SoCal Division	W	L	Win %
Arizona Scorpions	19	4	0.857
San Diego Surf	12	3	0.769
Fresno Flight	5	5	0.500
Los Angeles Slam	5	4	0.556
Orange County Novastars	2	10	0.167
Las Vegas Defenders	2	5	0.286
Southwest Division	W	L	Win %
North Dallas Vandals	20	2	0.867
West Texas Whirlwinds	15	3	0.867
Texas Fuel	5	4	0.556
Dallas Impact	3	4	0.500
Oklahoma Stallions	1	4	0.200
Houston Xperience	1	0	1.000
Louisiana Gators	0	1	0.000
Travel teams	W	L	Win %
Electric City Lions	6	4	0.667
Cleveland Am Pro'ers	3	7	0.222
Shizuoka Gymrats	1	12	0.083
St. Louis Scorpions	1	1	0.500
Ill City Beast	1	0	1.000
Little Rock Lighting	0	2	0.000
Chicago Fury	0	1	0.000
Listed-Never Played	W	L	Win %
ABA-Canada Revolution			0.000
Aberdeen Attack			0.000
California Sea Kings			0.000
Carolina Destiny			0.000
Chico Rage			0.000
Colorado Springs Crusaders			0.000
Delta Storm			0.000
East Bay Pit Bulls			0.000
Gem City Hall O' Famers			0.000
Georgia Bearcats			0.000
Georgia Razors			0.000
Grand Rapids Cyclones			0.000
Greencastle Golden Knights			0.000
Hampton Charters			0.000
Hampton Road Sharks			0.000
Hollywood Magic			0.000
Houston Red Storm			0.000
Indianapolis Drive			0.000
Kentucky Crusaders			0.000
Lake Charles Corsairs			0.000
Las Estrellas de Chicago			0.000
Las Vegas Knights			0.000
Miami Flame			0.000
Midwest Flames			0.000
Modesto Hawks			0.000
NEA Swag			0.000
Nashville Soul			0.000
New York Red Riders			0.000
NoVA Wonders			0.000
NorCal Bears			0.000
North Texas Fresh			0.000
Portsmouth Cavaliers			0.000
Richmond Rockets			0.000
San Diego Sol			0.000
Savannah Grizzles			0.000
SoCal Swish			0.000
South Valley Fever			0.000
West Virginia Blazers			0.000
Windy City Monsters			0.000
Wyoming Roughnecks			0.000
Yakima Vipers			0.000

== Playoffs ==
=== Round 1&2 ===
- Colorado Kings defeat Texas FUEL, 137-129
- Gulf Coast Flash defeat Jackson Showboats, 144-114
- Jersey Express defeat Richmond Rockets, 115-107
- Arizona Scorpions defeat Fresno Heat, 130-106
- San Francisco Rumble defeat Arizona Scorpions, 121-112
- Chicago Steam defeat Detroit Hoops, 133-88
- Gainesville Heat defeat Electric City Lions, 130-113
- Fayetteville Flight defeat Gainesville Heat, 130-119

Note: Although listed as part of the playoffs, these games seem to have little relevancy to the rest of the playoffs.

=== Regional Finals ===
East

- South Carolina Warriors defeat Bluff City Reign
- Jersey Express defeat Chicago Steam
- Final:South Carolina Warriors defeat Jersey Express

West

- Colorado Kings defeat Arizona Scorpions
- San Francisco Rumble defeat San Diego Surf
- Final: Colorado Kings defeat San Francisco Rumble

=== ABA Final Four ===
- Jacksonville Giants defeat Colorado Kings 117-94
- North Dallas Vandals defeat South Carolina Warriors 113-110

Finals

- Jacksonville Giants defeat North Dallas Vandals in two games
