= 2011–12 ABA season =

- League: American Basketball Association
- Sport: Basketball
- Duration: November 1, 2011 – March 31, 2012

Regular season

2012 ABA Playoffs
- Western Division champions: San Diego Sol
- Western Division runners-up: North Dallas Vandals
- Eastern Division champions: Jacksonville Giants
- Eastern Division runners-up: South Carolina Warriors

2012 ABA Championship
- Champions: Jacksonville Giants
- Runners-up: South Carolina Warriors

ABA seasons
- ← 2010–11 2012–13 →

The 2011–12 ABA season was the 11th season of the American Basketball Association that lasted from about November 2011, the finish of the regular season in late February, and the championship playoffs at the end of March 2012, which the Jacksonville Giants won by beating the South Carolina Warriors.

Originally, over ninety teams were scheduled to compete during the 2011–12 season. However, much of that list included teams that had no plans to start the season and teams which disappeared before the season began. Of the teams listed, East Kentucky Energy and Chi-Town Bulldogs disappeared before the season began. Midwest Flames folded, with players and coaches joining another team. St. Louis Pioneers and Indiana Diesels both left to join the Premier Basketball League. Tampa Bay Rain and Greencastle Golden Knights were originally set to start the season, but were moved to expansion teams for the next season.

This season was the first full season where the league released scores from games played.

== League standings ==
From USBasket.com

Atlantic South	W	L	Win %
Athens Razors	14	2	0.875
Jacksonville Giants	11	3	0.786
Gulf Coast Flash	7	3	0.700
Atlanta Experience	4	2	0.667
Heartland Heat	3	0	0.000
Atlanta Aliens	2	1	0.667
Georgia Gwizzlies	1	3	0.250
East Point Jaguars	0	9	0.000
Columbus Riverballers	0	3	0.000
Panama City Dream	0	3	0.000
California Northwest	W	L	Win %
Central Valley Titans	5	4	0.556
Modesto Hawks	3	2	0.600
NorCal Bears	1	9	0.100
Chico Rage	0	2	0.000
California South	W	L	Win %
Arizona Scorpions	19	3	0.864
San Diego Sol	18	2	0.900
San Diego Surf	8	7	0.533
Los Angeles Slam	6	12	0.333
Riverside Rainmakers	1	7	0.125
Las Vegas Aces	0	2	0.000
SoCal Swish	0	4	0.000
Shizuoka Gymrats	0	14	0.000
Colonial	W	L	Win %
Lynchburg Legends	11	6	0.647
Richmond Elite	10	2	0.833
NoVA Wonders	4	1	0.800
Portsmouth Cavaliers	2	4	0.333
West Virginia Blazers	5	9	0.357
Great Lakes	W	L	Win %
Chicago Steam	10	0	0.000
Cleveland Hotcards	0	1	0.000
Milwaukee Blast	3	0	0.000
Porter County Punishers	0	3	0.000
Mid-Atlantic	W	L	Win %
South Carolina Warriors	14	0	0.000
Carolina Cougars	9	5	0.643
Carolina Cheetahs	8	6	0.571
East Carolina Trojans	4	7	0.364
Nashville Soul	3	0	0.000
Tennessee Mad Hatters	2	10	0.167
Fayetteville Flight	2	13	0.133
Carolina Jaguars	0	8	0.000
Clarksville Cavaliers	0	2	0.000
Mid-Central	W	L	Win %
Lima Explosion	10	5	0.667
Detroit Hoops	5	4	0.556
Michiana Monarchs	3	4	0.429
Greencastle Golden Knights	2	0	0.000
Indianapolis Drive	2	0	0.000
Lansing Law	1	1	0.500
Gem City Hall O'Famers	0	2	0.000
Northeast	W	L	Win %
Connecticut Topballerz	10	1	0.909
Jersey Express	5	7	0.417
Staten Island Vipers	3	8	0.273
NYC Thunder	0	3	0.000
New York Charters	0	1	0.000
Pacific North	W	L	Win %
Bay Area Matrix	20	9	0.690
Richmond Rockets	18	7	0.720
San Francisco Rumble	18	4	0.818
Port City Pirates	12	10	0.545
East Bay Pit Bulls	9	13	0.409
Sacramento Heatwave	2	16	0.111
Pacific Northwest	W	L	Win %
Calgary Crush	0	4	0.000
Alaska Quake	4	7	0.364
Seattle Mountaineers	6	0	0.000
Washington Rampage	0	1	0.000
Rocky Mountain	W	L	Win %
Colorado Kings	22	0	0.000
Colorado Cougars	4	8	0.333
Colorado Springs Crusaders	2	5	0.286
Wyoming Roughnecks	0	4	0.000
South Central	W	L	Win %
Little Rock Lightning	15	6	0.714
Bluff City Reign	14	5	0.737
Conway Cyclones	11	7	0.611
NEA Swag	7	9	0.438
Missouri Rhythm	3	4	0.429
Southwest	W	L	Win %
North Dallas Vandals	12	1	0.923
Texas Fuel	12	2	0.857
West Texas Whirlwinds	5	6	0.455
Oklahoma Stallions	4	7	0.364
Houston Red Storm	2	0	0.000
Dallas Impact	1	6	0.143
North Texas Fresh	1	7	0.125
Travel Teams	W	L	Win %
Houston Experience	1	2	0.333
Rocky Mountain Stampede	0	1	0.000
Team Haiti	0	1	0.000
Appalachian Rapids	0	2	0.000
Florida Makos	0	4	0.000
Chicago Fury	0	6	0.000
Listed-Never Played	W	L	Win %
ABA-Canada	0	0	0.000
Mobile Bay Hurricanes			0.000
Delta Storm			0.000
Syracuse Shockwave			0.000
Orlando Kings			0.000
Savannah Storm			0.000
California Sea Kings			0.000
Norfolk Sharks			0.000
Seven City Knights			0.000
