= 2010–11 ABA season =

- League: American Basketball Association
- Sport: Basketball
- Duration: November 5, 2010 – March 2011

Regular season

2011 ABA Playoffs
- Eastern champions: Gulf Coast Flash
- Eastern runners-up: East Kentucky Energy
- Western champions: Southeast Texas Mavericks
- Western runners-up: Jacksonville Giants

2011 ABA Championship
- Champions: Southeast Texas Mustangs
- Runners-up: Gulf Coast Flash

ABA seasons
- ← 2009–10 2011–12 →

The 2010–11 ABA season was the tenth season of the American Basketball Association that lasted from November 5, 2010, the finish of the regular season in late February, and the championship series at the end of March 2011. The Southeast Texas Mavericks ended up defending their league championship from 2009, winning their second straight championship by defeating the Gulf Coast Flash 2–0.

Over sixty teams plan were originally scheduled to compete during the 2010–11 season. However, much of that list included teams that had no plans to start the season and teams which disappeared before the season began.

The league also planned to host over 800 games among the teams combined during the season.

== Regular season ==
=== November ===
The regular season started on November 5, 2010, with the expansion team St. Louis Pioneers on the road to defeat the Chicago Steam, 93–73. The next day, they did it again, winning over the Steam, 91–81 on November 6.

The Tri-State Showcase took place from November 12–14 between nine teams in Dallas, Texas. The teams featured were the Dallas Impact, North Dallas Vandals, North Texas Fresh, Texas Rim Rockers, Texas Fuel, West Texas Whirlwinds, Oklahoma Stallions, Houston Red Storm, and Colorado Kings. The nine teams played a total of thirteen games in the three days. It was held at the Lakewest Family YMCA, home of the Impact.

A big announcement was made on November 13 when the league announced five more expansion teams to form a division in Canada in the 2011 season. Franchises would be put in five regions: Oshawa, Toronto, Mississauga, Hamilton and Northwest Ontario. The Canadian teams, however, disappeared from listings in Summer 2011 and were replaced by a team ABA-Canada, which failed to start in the 2011–2012 season.

The Canadian Division was not the only announced 2011 expansion franchises. Before and during the first month of the ABA regular season, league offices reported new teams starting up in Richmond, Norfolk, Flint, Little Rock, Atlanta, Lynchburg (Virginia), among others.

On November 23, it was announced that the 2011 ABA All-Star Game would be held in Jacksonville, Florida, at Jacksonville Veterans Memorial Arena.

=== December ===
On December 2, the defending champion Southeast Texas Mavericks improved to 5–0 with an 84-point beatdown of Texas Fuel, 147–63. Nine players scored in double figures and Currye Todd scored a game-high 22 points. The Southeast Texas Mavericks, after recently extending their regular season game winning streak to twenty, were later defeated on the road against the Gulf Coast Flash by two points on December 21, falling to 9–1.

In late December, Marlo Saunders of the West Texas Whirlwinds surpassed 1,000 points scored and 500 rebounds in his short two-year career in the ABA, joining teammates Ray Williams and Charncy Ephriam as the only Whirlwinds to accomplish the feat.

=== February ===
The 2011 ABA All-Star Game resulted in a 123-122 Eastern conference win over the West, in front of a crowd of 4,488 at the Jacksonville Veterans Memorial Arena in Jacksonville, Florida. Kayode Ayeni, a forward from the Jersey Express, was rewarded with the game's Most Valuable Player award after scoring a game-high 25 points.

== Playoffs ==
After the ABA All-Star Game, the playoffs started. All teams still playing were eligible to enter. Jacksonville Giants and Southeast Texas Mustangs were given byes to the final rounds, to be played at home of the Mustangs. Other teams were given byes to later rounds, based on season performance. The Gulf Coast Flash won the Eastern Conference title over the East Kentucky Energy, and the Mustangs beat the Giants to win the Western. The last four teams played in a double-elimination tournament. The Mustangs beat the Flash 2-0 and won the title for the second time.

== League Standings ==
From USBasket.com

Playing-No Division/Travel Only	W	L	Win %
Colorado Kings	17	0	1.000
Arlington Bulldogs	2	3	0.400
New York Prime Time	1	4	0.200
Missouri Rhythm	1	3	0.250
Shizuoka Gymrats	0	4	0.000
Chico Rage	0	0	0.000
Gem City Hall O' Famers	0	1	0.000
Kentucky Crusaders	0	1	0.000
Team Haiti	0	1	0.000
Texas RimRockers	0	1	0.000
Gulf Coast	W	L	Win %
Southeast Texas Mavericks	23	1	0.958
Gulf Coast Flash	7	4	0.636
Mobile Bay Hurricanes	4	2	0.667
Louisiana United	1	5	0.167
Houston Red Storm	0	9	0.000
Mid-Atlantic	W	L	Win %
Seven City Knights	15	2	0.882
Fayetteville Flight	1	8	0.111
Georgia Gwizzlies	0	3	0.000
NoCal	W	L	Win %
East Bay Pit Bulls	14	5	0.737
Bay Area Matrix	13	7	0.650
Seattle Mountaineers	13	1	0.929
Modesto Hawks	9	8	0.529
California Sea Kings	8	6	0.571
Sacramento Heatwave	8	6	0.571
San Francisco Rumble	5	3	0.625
North Central	W	L	Win %
Chicago Steam	13	3	0.812
Lake Michigan Admirals	9	5	0.643
Northwestern Indiana Magical Stars	4	6	0.400
Detroit Hoops	1	2	0.333
Northeast	W	L	Win %
Jersey Express	3	1	0.750
New York Red Riders	0	1	0.000
NYC Thunder	0	1	0.000
SoCal	W	L	Win %
San Diego Sol	14	3	0.824
Las Vegas Aces	9	1	0.900
Los Angeles Slam	8	6	0.571
San Diego Surf	7	6	0.538
South Valley Fever	2	4	0.333
Riverside Rainmakers	2	4	0.333
SoCal Swish	1	4	0.200
Mid-Valley Titans	0	6	0.000
South Central	W	L	Win %
East Kentucky Energy	16	1	0.941
St. Louis Pioneers	8	3	0.727
Indiana Diesels	8	4	0.667
West Virginia Blazers	3	3	0.500
Southeast	W	L	Win %
Jacksonville Giants	19	0	1.000
Columbus Life	11	2	0.846
Savannah Storm	10	6	0.625
Heartland Prowl	8	3	0.727
Orlando Kings	0	2	0.000
Southwest	W	L	Win %
Texas Fuel	15	4	0.789
North Dallas Vandals	11	6	0.647
Oklahoma Stallions	8	5	0.615
West Texas Whirlwinds	8	6	0.571
Dallas Impact	3	4	0.429
North Texas Fresh	1	5	0.167
Listed-never played	W	L	Win %
Atlanta Vision	0	0	0.000
Bahama All-Pro Show	0	0	0.000
Charlotte Crossovers	0	0	0.000
Clayton Showtime	0	0	0.000
College Park Spyders	0	0	0.000
Compton Cobras	0	0	0.000
Cypress Express	0	0	0.000
Florida Makos	0	0	0.000
Florida Thundercats	0	0	0.000
Georgia Knights	0	0	0.000
Indianapolis Drive	0	0	0.000
Kansas City Stars	0	0	0.000
Kentucky Bisons	0	0	0.000
Maryland Marvels	0	0	0.000
Pittsburgh Phantoms	0	0	0.000
South Jersey Knights	0	0	0.000
Tri-City Suns	0	0	0.000
