= 2011 ABA All-Star Game =

Exhibition basketball game

2008 ABA All-Star Game
East	West
123	122
- Date: February 26, 2011
- Venue: Jacksonville Veterans Memorial Arena, Jacksonville
- MVP: Kayode Ayeni
- Attendance: 4,488

The 2011 American Basketball Association All-Star Game was held in Jacksonville, Florida at the 15,000 seat Jacksonville Veterans Memorial Arena on February 26, 2011.

The East team was coached by Kevin Waters of the Jacksonville Giants, while the West team was coached by Steve Tucker of the Southeast Texas Mavericks. The East defeated the West, 123–122, in front of an enthusiastic crowd of 4,488.

Kayode Ayeni of the Jersey Express was named Most Valuable Player.

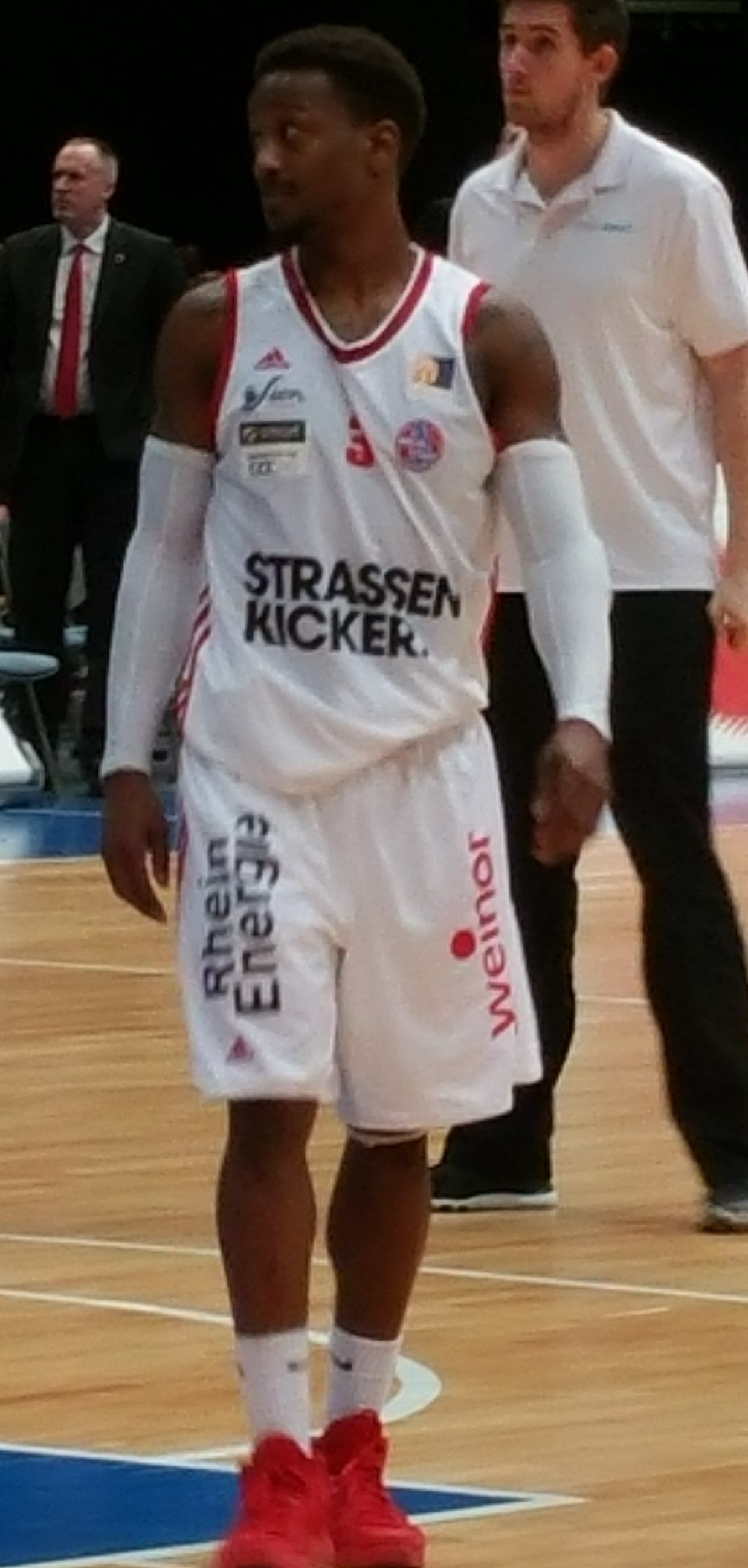
Richard Williams was selected for the West.

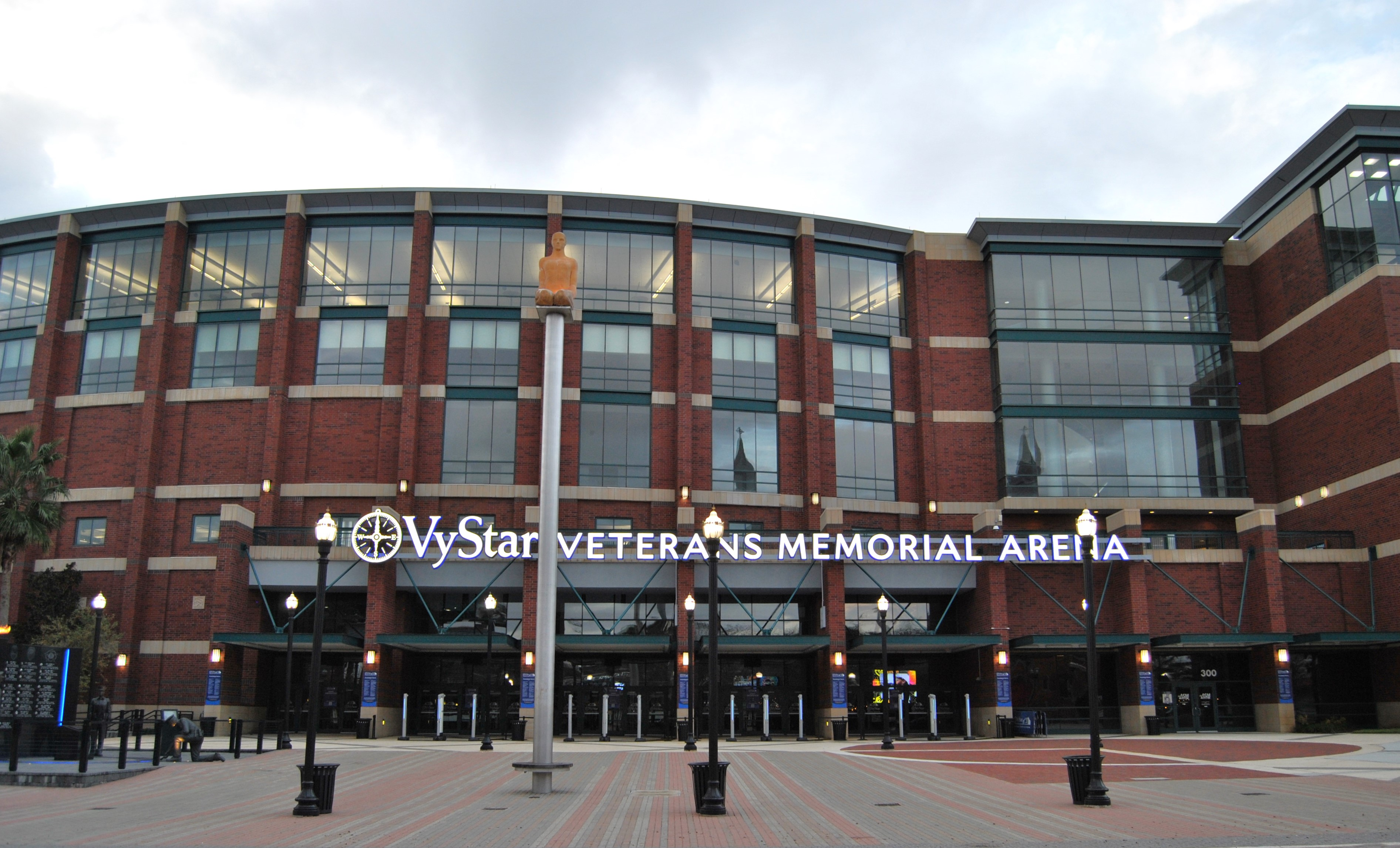
The Jacksonville Veterans Memorial Arena.

== 2011 ABA All-Star Game events ==
=== The Three-Point contest ===
J. R. VanHoose of the East Kentucky Energy won the 3-Point Contest.

== All-Star teams ==
=== Rosters ===
East All-Stars
Pos.	Player	Team	Appearance
Roster
G	Anthony Jackson	Columbus Riverballers	
G	Ramar Smith	Georgia Gwizzlies	
G	Daniel Price	East Kentucky Energy	
G	Anthony Muse	Chicago Steam	
G	JaLeel Nelson	Seven City Knights	
G	Edward Horton	Jacksonville Giants	
F	Odgra Bobo	Lake Michigan Admirals	
F	Freeman Taylor	Gulf Coast Flash	
F	Sherrad Riddick	Savannah Storm	
F	Kayode Ayeni	Jersey Express	
C	Jermaine Bell	Jacksonville Giants	
C	J. R. VanHoose	East Kentucky Energy	
Alternates
G	Eric Ruffin	Seven City Knights	
G	Ralon Alman	West Virginia Blazers	
G	Germaine Williams	Fayetteville Flight	
G	Gus Chase	Lake Michigan Admirals	
Head coach: Kevin Waters (Jacksonville Giants)

West All-Stars
Pos.	Player	Team	Appearance
Rosters
G	Richie Williams	San Diego Sol	
G	Marlo Saunders	West Texas Whirlwinds	
G	Mike Dyson	Modesto Hawks	
G	James Doran*	Sacramento Heatwave	
G	Louis Kelly	Las Vegas Aces	
G	Jordan Boreman	East Bay Pitbulls	
G	Kenny Wilson	Texas Fuel	
F	O'Dell Bradley*	Southeast Texas Mavericks	
F	Devon Pearson	North Dallas Vandals	
F	Josh Pace	Southeast Texas Mavericks	
C	RaSheen Dickey	Colorado Kings	
C	Gene Shipley	San Diego Surf	
Alternates
C	Lamar Wright	Texas Fuel	
G	Mario Kinsey	Oklahoma Stallions	
C	Joe Rodgers	Louisiana United	
F	Matt Shaw	So Cal Swish	
Head coach: Steve Tucker (Southeast Texas Mavericks)

- Selected but unable to play.

== See also ==
- 2006 ABA All-Star Game
- 2007 ABA All-Star Game
- 2010-11 ABA season
