= ABA All-Star Game (2000–present) =

Professional basketball league founded in 2000

American Basketball Association All-Star Game
- Status: Active
- Frequency: Annually
- Inaugurated: 2002
- Most recent: 2025
- Organizer: ABA

The ABA All-Star Game is an annual basketball event in the United States, organised by the ABA (2000). It was launched in 2002 as a revival of the original ABA All-Star Game which had started in 1968. The event is held annually and consisted of an all-star game, a three-point shoot contest and slam-dunk exhibition. The Slam Dunk Contest was first introduced worldwide in the original ABA All-Star Game. The first winner was Julius Erving of the New York Nets in 1976.

Many former NBA players like Tim Hardaway, Sam Mack, Gary Grant, and Armen Gilliam have played in the All-Star Game.

== List of games ==
Bold: Team that won the game.

Year	Result	Host arena	Host city	Game MVP	Ref
2001	Not held.				
2002	**Kansas City Knights** 161, ABA All-Stars 138	Kemper Arena	Kansas City, Missouri	(United States) Maurice Carter, Kansas City Knights	
2003	Not held due to league shutdown.				
2004	Not held.				
2005	**West** 163, East 149	Las Vegas Sports Center	Las Vegas, Nevada	(United States) Lou Kelly, Las Vegas Rattlers	
2006	**East** 129, West 127	BankAtlantic Center	Sunrise, Florida	(United States) Armen Gilliam, Pittsburgh Xplosion	
2007	**West** 138, East 123	Halifax Metro Centre	Halifax, Nova Scotia, Canada	(United States) Billy Knight, Atlanta Vision	
2008	**East** 161, West 140	Barre Auditorium	Barre, Vermont	(United States) Anthony Anderson, Manchester Millrats	
2009	**West**, East	Nashville Municipal Auditorium	Nashville, Tennessee	(United States) Keith Simpson, Texas Fuel	
2010	ABA West All-Stars vs. Gilas Pilipinas	Hangar Athletic Xchange	Los Angeles, California		
2011	**East** 123, West 122	Jacksonville Veterans Memorial Arena	Jacksonville, Florida	(United States) Kayode Ayeni, Jersey Express	
2012	Red vs. White vs. Blue (round-robin tournament)	Eckerd College	St. Petersburg, Florida		
2013	**East** 198, West 141	South Suburban College	South Holland, Illinois	(United States) Maurice Mickens, Memphis Bluff City Reign	
2014	No reported result.	Grandview Christian School	Grandview, Missouri		
2015	**South** 138, North 131	Kroc Center	South Bend, Indiana		
2016	**Team Dr. J** 140, Team Gervin 139	St. Frances Academy	Baltimore, Maryland	(United States) Terry Hosley, DMV Warriors	
2017	**South**, North	Big Ben's Home Court	Richmond, Virginia	(United States) Christopher Cromartie, South Florida Gold	
2018	No reported result.	Giving Heart Community Center	Pittsburgh, Pennsylvania	(United States) Antonio Reddic, Steel City Yellow Jackets	
2019	No reported result.	Giving Heart Community Center	Pittsburgh, Pennsylvania		
2020	Not held due to COVID-19 pandemic.				
2021	**East** 210, West 165	James J. Eagan Center	Florissant, Missouri		
2022	East vs. West				
2023	**East** 169, West 151	Jefferson College	Hillsboro, Missouri	(United States) Dominique Jones, Garden State Warriors	
2024	**West** 129, East 122	Spring Hill College	Mobile, Alabama	(United States) David Jones, St. Louis Spirits	
2025	**Team Presley** 210, Team Coley 183	St. Louis Community College–Forest Park	St. Louis, Missouri	(United States) Rodney Gaston, Windy City Inferno	
2026	**Team Presley** 153, Team Hampfield 151	Paradise Church of God in Christ Gymnasium	Forest Park, Georgia	(United States) Tymir Robinson, Stone Mountain Strong Steppers	

== All-Star Game events ==
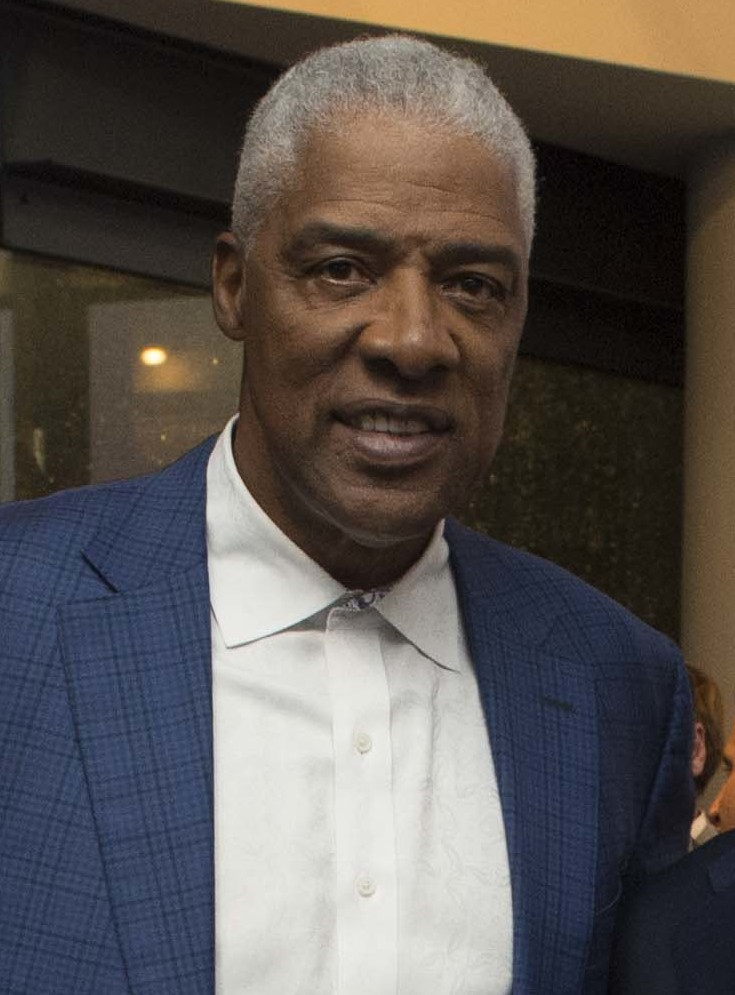
Julius Erving's team won the All-Star Game in 2016. Erving won the first-ever Slam-dunk contest in 1976.

=== Three-Point Shoot Contest ===
Year	Player	Team
2006	(United States) Randy Gill	
2008	(United States) Robin Kennedy	Orange County Gladiators
2011	(United States) J. R. VanHoose	East Kentucky Energy

=== Slam-Dunk champions ===
Year	Player	Team
2006	(United States) Ray Cunningham	
2008	(United States) Chris Cayole	Vermont Frost Heaves

== Topscorers ==
Year	Player	Points	Team
2002	(United States) Maurice Carter	46	Kansas City Knights
2005	(United States) Randy Gill	27	Maryland Nighthawks
2006	(United States) Armen Gilliam	29	Pittsburgh Xplosion

== Notable participants ==
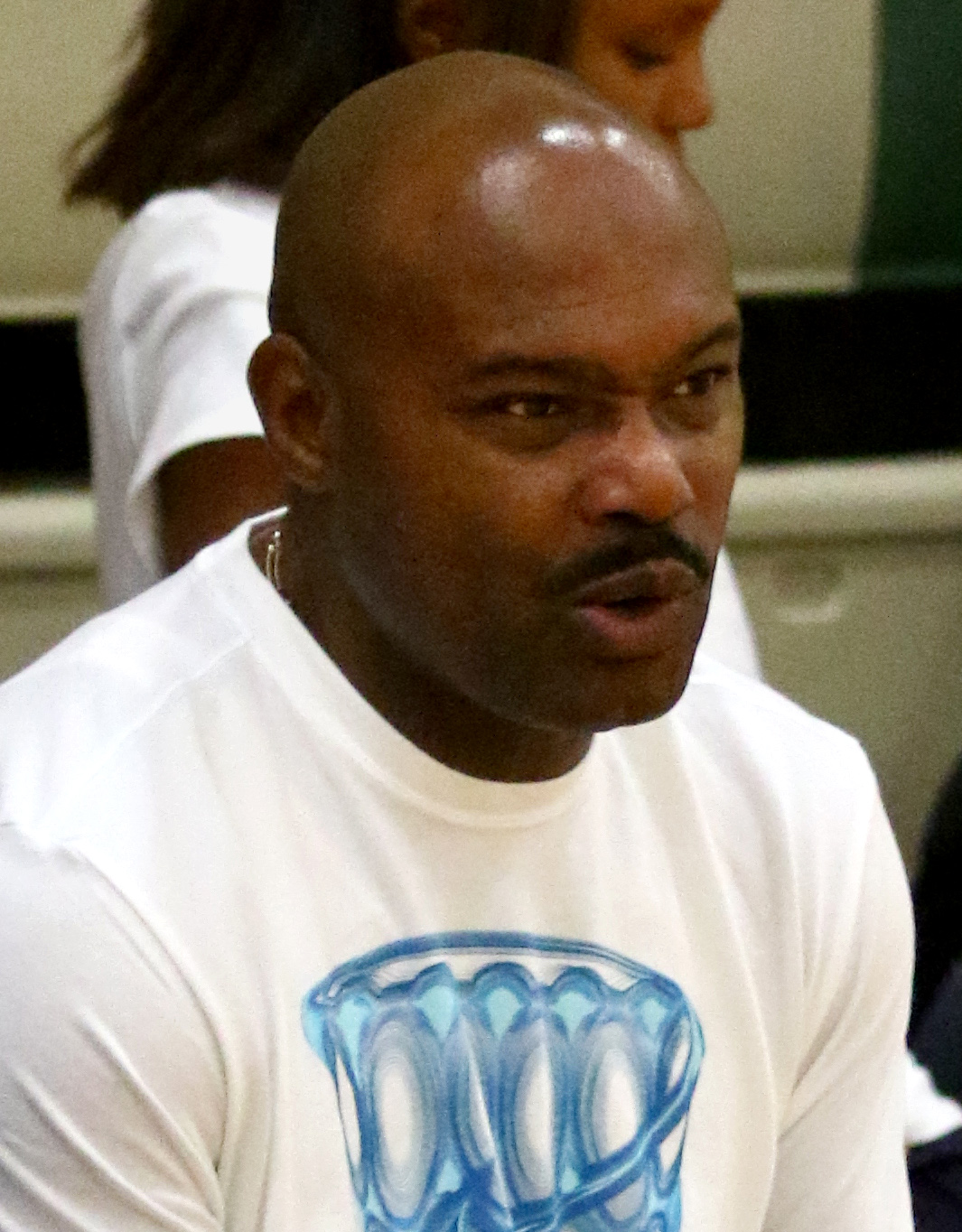
5-time NBA All-Star Tim Hardaway was selected for the 2006 edition.

- (United States) Tim Hardaway
- (United States) Armen Gilliam
- (United States) Sam Mack
- (United States) Dontae' Jones
- (Canada) Manix Auriantal
- (United States) Lawrence Moten
- (United States) Greg Graham
- (United States) Richie Williams
- (Rwanda) Kenny Gasana
- (Senegal) Issa Konare
- (United States) Josh Pace
- (United States) Kayode Ayeni
- (United States) Kareem Reid
- (United States) Antwain Barbour
- (United States) Pete Mickeal
- (United States) Gary Grant
- (China) Sun Yue
- (United States) (South Korea) Eric Sandrin

== Distinctions ==
=== Basketball Hall of Fame ===
- (United States) Tim Hardaway
- (United States) Julius Erving (coach)
- (United States) George Gervin (coach)

=== Collegiate Basketball Hall of Fame ===
- (United States) George Gervin (coach)
- (United States) Julius Erving (coach)

== See also ==
- American Basketball Association (2000–present)
