= 2009–10 ABA season =

- League: American Basketball Association
- Sport: Basketball
- Duration: November 2009 – March 2010

Regular season

Playoffs
- Eastern champions: Kentucky Bisons
- Eastern runners-up: Bluegrass Stallions
- Western champions: Southeast Texas Mavericks
- Western runners-up: San Francisco Rumble

2010 ABA Championship
- Champions: Southeast Texas Mavericks
- Runners-up: Kentucky Bisons

ABA seasons
- ← 2008–09 2010–11 →

The 2009–10 ABA season was the ninth season of the American Basketball Association that lasted from November 2009 and ended with the three-game championship series between the Kentucky Bisons and the Southeast Texas Mavericks at the end of March 2010. The Mavericks won the championship series, two games to one after an 85–76 win March 30 for their first title.

== League changes ==
For the first time, the league championship was played in a three-game series, between the Kentucky Bisons and Southeast Texas Mavericks, a series in which was won by the Mavericks, two games to one.

== Regular season standings ==
These are the 2009-2010 regular season standings. Many franchises folded during the season, resulting in very few games being played for a lot of teams.

North California	W	L	Win %
San Francisco Rumble	22	8	0.733
Clayton Showtime	16	7	0.696
California Sea Kings	16	12	0.571
Sacramento Heatwave	13	12	0.520
North Central Division	W	L	Win %
Chicago Steam	16	4	0.800
Lake Michigan Admirals	13	6	0.684
Columbus Crush	8	3	0.727
Pittsburgh Phantoms (ABA)	6	2	0.750
Detroit Hoops	6	5	0.545
Kansas City Stars	4	0	1.000
Cleveland Rockers (ABA)	2	2	0.500
Grand Rapids Flight	0	2	0.000
Youngstown Swish	0	2	0.000
Akron Rise	0	5	0.000
Northeast Division	W	L	Win %
Jersey Express	12	4	0.750
NYC Thunder	9	3	0.750
Maryland Marvels	7	10	0.412
New York Red Riders	6	9	0.400
Tri-City Suns	5	9	0.357
Pacific Northwest Division	W	L	Win %
Seattle Mountaineers	9	8	0.529
Seattle Zhen Gan	3	0	1.000
Everett Longshoremen	2	2	0.500
Spokane Sunz	1	1	0.500
Washington Rapids	1	6	0.143
Southern California Division	W	L	Win %
Riverside Rainmakers	9	3	0.750
Los Angeles Slam	6	9	0.400
San Diego Surf	5	8	0.385
Compton Cobras	4	2	0.667
Central Valley Dawgs	4	10	0.286
Las Vegas Aces	3	0	1.000
California Beach Ballers	2	6	0.250
Honolulu Pegasus	1	1	0.500
South Central Division	W	L	Win %
Kentucky Bluegrass Stallions	13	7	0.650
Kentucky Bisons	12	7	0.632
West Virginia Blazers	6	10	0.375
St. Louis Stunners	0	3	0.000
Southeast Division	W	L	Win %
Music City Stars	9	3	0.750
Mississippi Blues	4	6	0.400
Columbus Life	3	5	0.375
Florida Thundercats	1	0	1.000
Charlotte Crossovers	1	3	0.250
Carolina Kings	0	0	0.000
Georgia PROWL	0	1	0.000
Southwest Division	W	L	Win %
Southeast Texas Mustangs	23	3	0.885
North Texas Fresh	10	4	0.714
West Texas Whirlwinds	7	6	0.538
Texas Fuel	3	11	0.214
Dallas Generals	2	1	0.667
Texas Chaparrals	0	2	0.000
Houston Takers	0	6	0.000
Exhibition Teams	W	L	Win %
Play2Win Rimrockers	10	4	0.714

== Postseason ==
Quarterfinals
3	Bluegrass Stallions
Elmira Red Riders
2	Chicago Steam
9	Lake Michigan Admirals
4	Kentucky Bisons
14	West Virginia Blazers
8	West Texas Whirlwinds
Texas Fuel
10	Los Angeles Slam
So Cal Tournament Winner
6	San Francisco Rumble
Sacramento Heatwave

Semifinals
5	Jersey Express	91
Bluegrass Stallions	99
Chicago Steam	106
Kentucky Bisons	114
1	Southeast Texas Mavericks	146
Texas Fuel	84
Los Angeles Slam
San Francisco Rumble

Finals
Bluegrass Stallions	100
Kentucky Bisons	91
Southeast Texas Mavericks
San Francisco Rumble	Forfeit

ABA Championship
Kentucky Bisons	99, 83, 76
Southeast Texas Mavericks	96, 104, 85

Note: Finals was a best of 3 series.
Note: ABA did not release the game results for the first round or the winners of the regional first round tournaments.
