= Jarrid Frye =

American basketball player

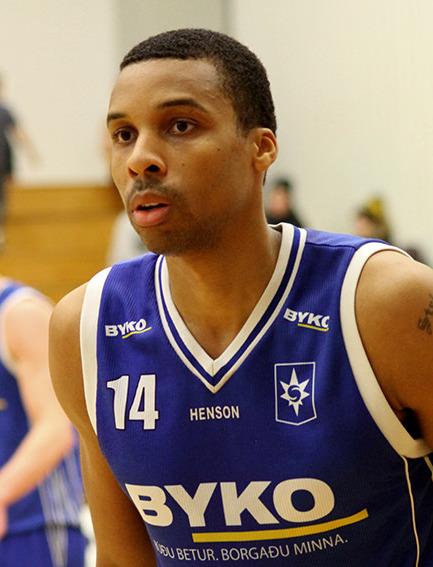
- Frye with Stjarnan in 2015

Personal information
- Born: May 25, 1985 (age 41) Queens, New York, U.S.
- Listed height: 6 ft 5 in (1.96 m)
- Listed weight: 207 lb (94 kg)

Career information
- High school: Martin Luther (Queens, New York)
- College: Sacred Heart (2003–2007)
- NBA draft: 2007: undrafted
- Playing career: 2007–2015
- Position: Small forward

Career history
- 2007–2009: AMAK SP
- 2010: Kentucky Bisons
- 2010–2012: Feni Industries
- 2013: Stjarnan
- 2013–2014: Adelaide 36ers
- 2014–2015: Stjarnan

Career highlights
- Icelandic Cup champion (2013); Icelandic Cup MVP (2013); MFL champion (2011); Balkan League champion (2011); Macedonian Cup champion (2009); First-team All-NEC (2007); Second-team All-NEC (2006)

Jarrid Jamel Frye (born May 25, 1985) is an American former professional basketball player who last played for the Stjarnan of the Icelandic Úrvalsdeild karla. He attended Martin Luther High School and played college basketball at Sacred Heart University. Since retiring, Frye has taught geometry at Spanish River High School in Boca Raton, Florida

== Professional ==
After going undrafted in the 2007 NBA draft, Frye moved to Macedonia where he played two seasons with KK AMAK SP.

In February 2010, Frye signed with the Kentucky Bisons for the rest of the 2009–10 ABA season.

In the summer of 2010, Frye signed with KK Feni Industries of Macedonia for the 2010–11 season, going on to win the 2011 MFL championship. In August 2011, he re-signed with Feni for the 2011–12 season.

In January 2013, Frye signed with Stjarnan of Úrvalsdeild karla for the rest of the 2012–13 season. He helped Stjarnan win the Icelandic Cup that season and was named the Cup Finals MVP after posting 32 points, 8 rebounds and 6 assists.

On July 16, 2013, Frye signed with the Adelaide 36ers for the 2013–14 NBL season. After missing the season opener against the Perth Wildcats due to injury, Frye made his debut for the 36ers on October 19, 2013, recording 15 points and 7 rebounds in a 97–91 win over the Wollongong Hawks. On February 12, 2014, he was released by the 36ers due to under-performing play and an ankle injury. In 19 games, he averaged 8.2 points, 4.4 rebounds and 1.5 assists per game.

In July 2014, Frye returned to Iceland, signing with his former team Stjarnan for the 2014–15 season. He left the team in January 2015 after appearing in 14 games.
