= Chris Beard =

American basketball coach (born 1973)

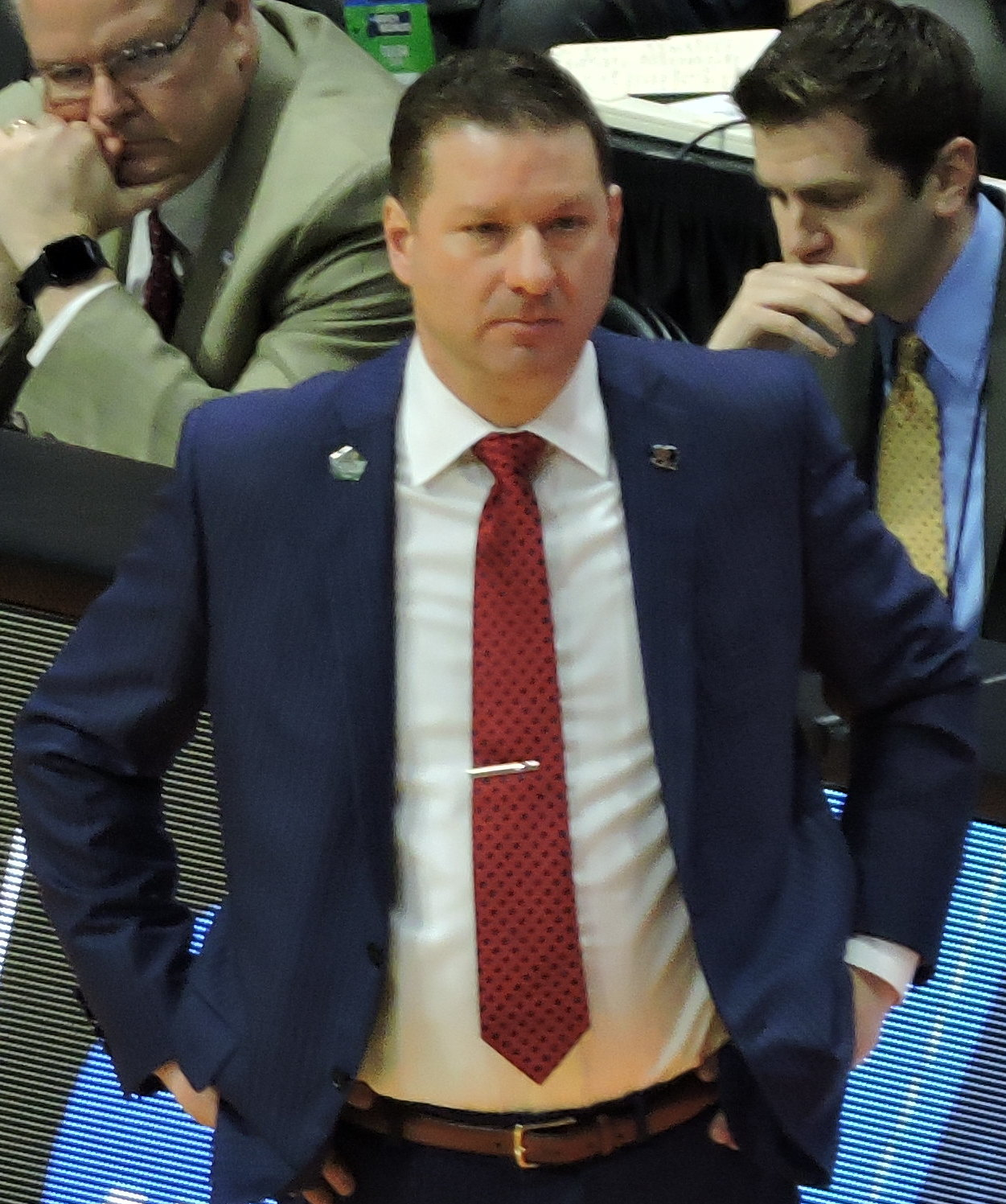
- Beard coaching Texas Tech in 2019

Current position
- Title: Head coach
- Team: Ole Miss
- Conference: SEC
- Record: 63–44 (.589)
- Annual salary: $5 million

Biographical details
- Born: February 18, 1973 (age 53); Marietta, Georgia, U.S.
- Education: University of Texas at Austin (BS), ('95); Abilene Christian University (MEd), ('98)

Coaching career (HC unless noted)
- 1991–1995: Texas (student assistant)
- 1995–1996: Incarnate Word (GA)
- 1996–1997: Abilene Christian (assistant)
- 1997–1999: North Texas (assistant)
- 1999–2000: Fort Scott CC
- 2000–2001: Seminole State JC
- 2001–2011: Texas Tech (assoc. HC)
- 2011–2012: South Carolina Warriors
- 2012–2013: McMurry
- 2013–2015: Angelo State
- 2015–2016: Little Rock
- 2016–2021: Texas Tech
- 2021–2023: Texas
- 2023–present: Ole Miss

Head coaching record
- Overall: 300–142 (.679) (NCAA); 44–18 (.710) (Junior College)
- Tournaments: 12–6 (NCAA Division I); 2–1 (NCAA Division II)

Accomplishments and honors

Championships
- NCAA Division I tournament Final Four (2019); Sun Belt tournament (2016); Sun Belt regular season (2016); Big 12 regular season (2019)

Awards
- AP National Coach of the Year (2019); Jim Phelan Award (2025); Lone Star Coach of the Year (2015); Sun Belt Coach of the Year (2016); 2× Big 12 Coach of the Year (2018, 2019)

Christopher Michael Beard (born February 18, 1973) is an American basketball coach who is the head men's coach at University of Mississippi (Ole Miss). He also previously served as head coach at Texas, Texas Tech, Little Rock, Angelo State, and McMurry. Beard graduated from high school from McCullough High School in The Woodlands, Texas. He was a manager at Texas under former Longhorns coach Tom Penders, graduating in 1995 with a Bachelor of Science degree in kinesiology. He received a Masters of Education from Abilene Christian University where he served as a graduate assistant in 1998.

Under Beard's watch, the Texas Tech Red Raiders made the deepest NCAA Tournament runs in school history. In 2019, the Red Raiders won a school-record 31 games on the way to the 2019 NCAA Division I Men's Basketball Championship Game against the Virginia Cavaliers. He was recognized as the 2019 AP National Coach of the Year.

== Early life ==
Beard was born in Marietta, Georgia and grew up in Irving, Texas, before moving to The Woodlands, Texas as a high schooler. Beard attended McCullough High School (now The Woodlands High School) where he was a shooting guard on the basketball team. Beard turned down offers to play college basketball to be a student manager at the University of Texas.

== Coaching career ==
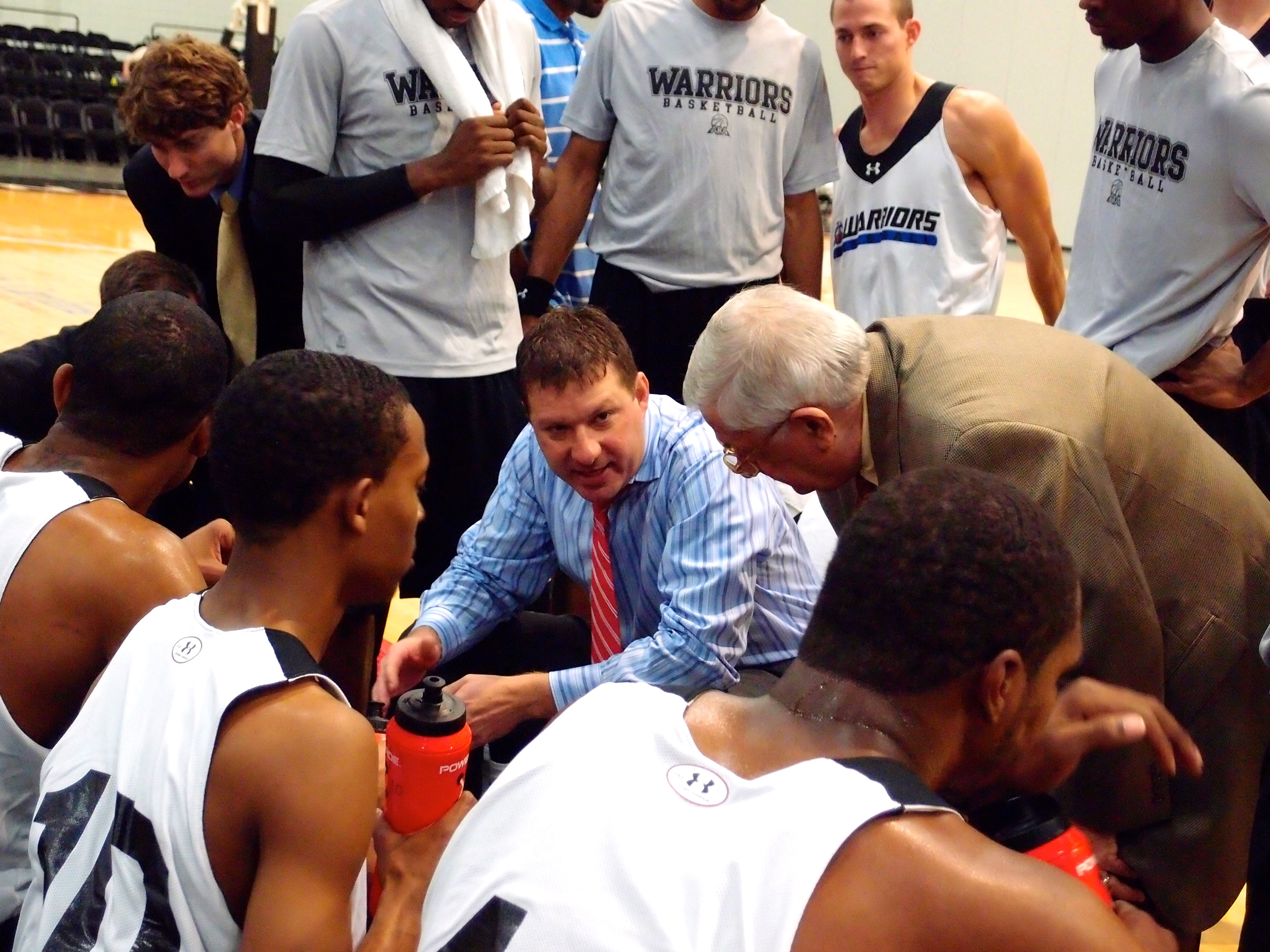
Chris Beard coaching the South Carolina Warriors, who finished their 2011–12 ABA season undefeated before losing in the ABA Finals.

After serving as a student manager and student assistant at the University of Texas for Tom Penders and a graduate assistant at Incarnate Word and Abilene Christian, Beard was an assistant coach at North Texas from 1997 to 1999.

From there, Beard was hired as head coach at Fort Scott Community College where he coached the team to a 19–12 record and its first winning season in 8 years. In 2000, he was hired as the head coach at Seminole State College. In his one year there he went 25–6 and finished ranked 14th in the country.

Following that season, Beard was hired as an assistant and later associate head coach at Texas Tech to work under the legendary Bob Knight. During his time at Texas Tech, the Red Raiders made four NCAA tournament appearances along with a trip to the NIT Final Four. Chris Beard spent 10 years coaching at Texas Tech under Bob Knight and his son Pat Knight, often citing the influence of the two men as his keys to success.

Beard also spent one year as head coach for the South Carolina Warriors of the American Basketball Association, where he led the team to a 29–2 record. On March 8, 2012, Beard was hired as head coach at Lamar State College–Port Arthur, but resigned six days later for the same position at McMurry University in Abilene, Texas, where he spent one season. In March 2013, he was hired as the sixth head coach at Angelo State. In two years with the Rams, he went 47–15.

=== Little Rock ===
On April 8, 2015, Beard was named the head coach of Arkansas–Little Rock.

In his first and only season at UALR, the Trojans went 30–5 and won the regular season and Sun Belt tournament titles to clinch an automatic bid to the NCAA tournament. Little Rock was awarded a 12 seed and knocked off fifth-seeded Purdue 85–83 in double overtime to advance to the Second Round, where they fell to Iowa State.

Beard was named Sun Belt Coach of the Year for his efforts.

=== Texas Tech ===
On March 27, 2016, Beard accepted the head coaching job at UNLV. When the Texas Tech head coaching job was made vacant by Tubby Smith's departure to Memphis, Beard took the Texas Tech job on April 15, 2016. Beard cited his 10 years as an assistant coach at Texas Tech University under Bob Knight and Pat Knight amongst the reasons that he took the job and the proximity to his daughters who live a few hours away from Lubbock.

On January 3, 2017, Beard led Texas Tech to upset #7 West Virginia leading the Red Raiders to their first regular-season win over the Mountaineers in program history. The following year he again led Texas Tech to a 72–71 win over #2 WVU. His 2017–18 team was also the first Texas Tech team to win at Kansas, snapping a 17-game road losing streak against the Jayhawks. Beard won the Big 12 Co-Coach of the Year in 2018. On March 23, 2018, Beard coached Texas Tech to its first-ever Elite Eight berth in program history with a 78–65 win over the Purdue Boilermakers.

On March 9, 2019, under Beard's leadership Texas Tech won a share of the Big 12 regular season title, Texas Tech's first ever title in the Big 12 conference and its first conference title since 1996 when the team played in the Southwest Conference. At the conclusion of the 2019 season, Beard earned Big 12 coach of the year honors as he led Texas Tech to a 26–5 regular season record, second only to Tech's 30–1 record in 1995–96. On March 30, 2019, Beard led Texas Tech to the first Final Four appearance in school history with a 75–69 victory over Gonzaga to win the West Regional. On April 6, 2019, Beard led the Red Raiders to a 61–51 victory over Michigan State to earn the school's first National Championship berth. The Red Raiders would finish runners-up to Virginia in the final, losing 85–77 in overtime.

On April 29, 2019, Beard signed a six-year extension worth more than $4.5 million a season, becoming the third-highest-paid college basketball coach in the country.

=== Texas ===
On April 1, 2021, Beard was hired as the 25th head coach at the University of Texas. In his first season, Beard led Texas to a 22–12 season and a win in the NCAA tournament. Texas lost to Purdue in the second round. Texas won the most games and had its first NCAA tournament win since 2013–14.

In the 2022–23 season Beard led Texas to a 7–1 start including wins against then top ten ranked Gonzaga and Creighton. On January 5, 2023, Texas fired Beard. He finished his career at Texas with a 29–13 record.

==== Arrest and firing from Texas ====
On December 12, 2022, Beard was arrested on a third-degree felony charge of assault against a family member for strangulation. According to the police report, Beard's fiancée Randi Trew told them Beard, "choked me, bit me, bruises all over my leg, throwing me around, and going nuts," consistent with bite marks on her arm and cuts on her face and leg. He was subsequently suspended without pay by the University of Texas. Trew later claimed that Beard was acting in self-defense and that he never strangled her, stating "As Chris' fiancé and biggest supporter, I apologize for the role I played in this unfortunate event. I realize that my frustration, when breaking his glasses, initiated a physical struggle between Chris and myself. Chris did not strangle me, and I told that to law enforcement that evening. Chris has stated that he was acting in self-defense, and I do not refute that. I do not believe Chris was trying to intentionally harm me in any way. It was never my intent to have him arrested or prosecuted." Beard was fired from his position at the University of Texas on January 5, 2023.

On January 26, Beard listed his house in Austin for sale, which had been listed in the Austin Police Department arrest affidavit.

On February 15, Travis County District Attorney José Garza announced that based on the case evidence and the fiancee’s wishes not to prosecute, he likely could not get a conviction. The third-degree felony charge was dismissed as was the threat of up to 10 years in prison.

=== Ole Miss ===
The University of Mississippi named Beard their new men's basketball coach on March 13, 2023. ESPN quoted Beard as saying, "I am honored to be joining the Ole Miss family and excited to get started at this great university". Beard had been mentioned as a possible replacement for the Rebels since the school fired Kermit Davis in late February. Davis had compiled a record of 74–79 over five seasons and failed to reach the NCAA tournament following an appearance in his first season.

For the 2024–25 season, Beard won the Jim Phelan Award as national coach of the year.

== Personal life ==
Beard has three daughters with his ex-wife Leslie.

== Head coaching record ==
Record table
Season	Team	Overall	Conference	Standing	Postseason
McMurry War Hawks (Heartland Conference) (2012–2013)
2012–13	McMurry	19–10	10–8	None	NCCAA Regional Final
McMurry:		19–10 (.655)	10–8 (.556)		
Angelo State Rams (Lone Star Conference) (2013–2015)
2013–14	Angelo State	19–9	8–6	3rd	
2014–15	Angelo State	28–6	11–3	2nd	NCAA Division II Sweet 16
Angelo State:		47–15 (.758)	19–9 (.679)		
Little Rock Trojans (Sun Belt Conference) (2015–2016)
2015–16	Little Rock	30–5	17–3	1st	NCAA Division I Round of 32
Little Rock:		30–5 (.857)	17–3 (.850)		
Texas Tech Red Raiders (Big 12 Conference) (2016–2021)
2016–17	Texas Tech	18–14	6–12	T–7th	
2017–18	Texas Tech	27–10	11–7	T–2nd	NCAA Division I Elite Eight
2018–19	Texas Tech	31–7	14–4	T–1st	NCAA Division I Runner-Up
2019–20	Texas Tech	18–13	9–9	T–3rd	NCAA Division I Cancelled
2020–21	Texas Tech	18–11	9–8	T–6th	NCAA Division I Round of 32
Texas Tech:		112–55 (.671)	49–40 (.551)		
Texas Longhorns (Big 12 Conference) (2021–2023)
2021–22	Texas	22–12	10–8	4th	NCAA Division I Round of 32
2022–23	Texas	7–1 (Note: Chris Beard was the head coach for the first eight games of the season. Texas suspended Beard on December 12, 2022, and fired him on January 5, 2023.)	0–0		
Texas:		29–13 (.690)	10–8 (.556)		
Ole Miss Rebels (Southeastern Conference) (2023–present)
2023–24	Ole Miss	20–12	7–11	10th	
2024–25	Ole Miss	24–12	10–8	T–6th	NCAA Division I Sweet 16
2025–26	Ole Miss	15–20	4–14	T–14th	
2026–27	Ole Miss	4–0	0–0		
Ole Miss:		63–44 (.589)	21–33 (.389)		
Total:		300–142 (.679)			
National champion Postseason invitational champion Conference regular season champion Conference regular season and conference tournament champion Division regular season champion Division regular season and conference tournament champion Conference tournament champion

== See also ==
- List of NCAA Division I men's basketball tournament Final Four appearances by coach
