= Fair Park Coliseum (Dallas) =

Multi-purpose arena in Dallas, Texas

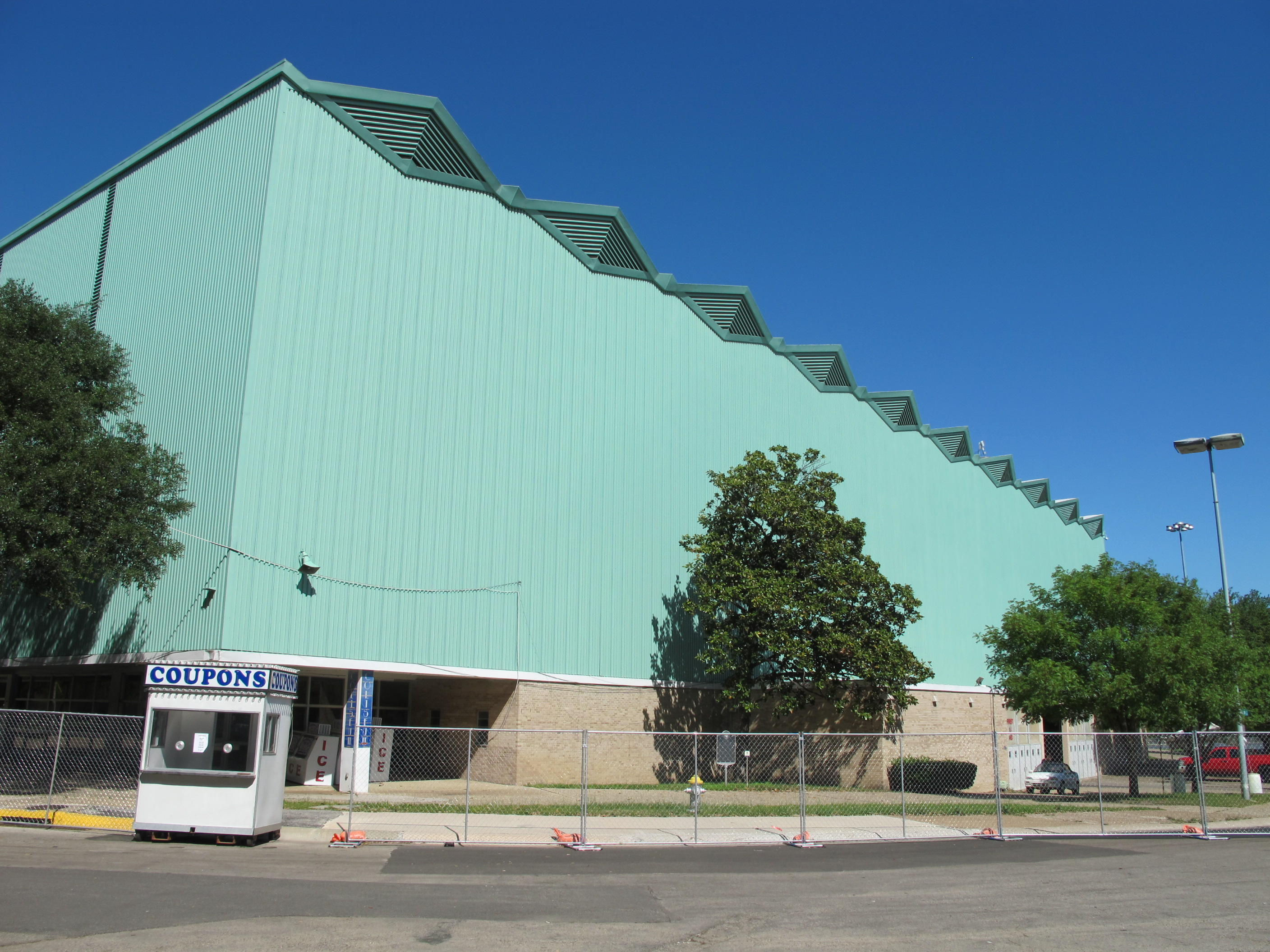
- Interactive map of Fair Park Coliseum
- Full name: Fair Park Coliseum
- Coordinates: 32.779175°N 96.757193°W
- Capacity: Basketball: 8,513

Construction
- Opened: 1955
- Renovated: 1988

Tenants
- Dallas Black Hawks (CHL) (1967–1982); Dallas Chaparrals (ABA) (1967–1970); Dallas Tornado (NASL) (1975); Dallas Generals (ABA) (2009–2010); Assassination City Roller Derby (WFTDA) (2011–2013); Dallas Bulls (NAL) (2026)

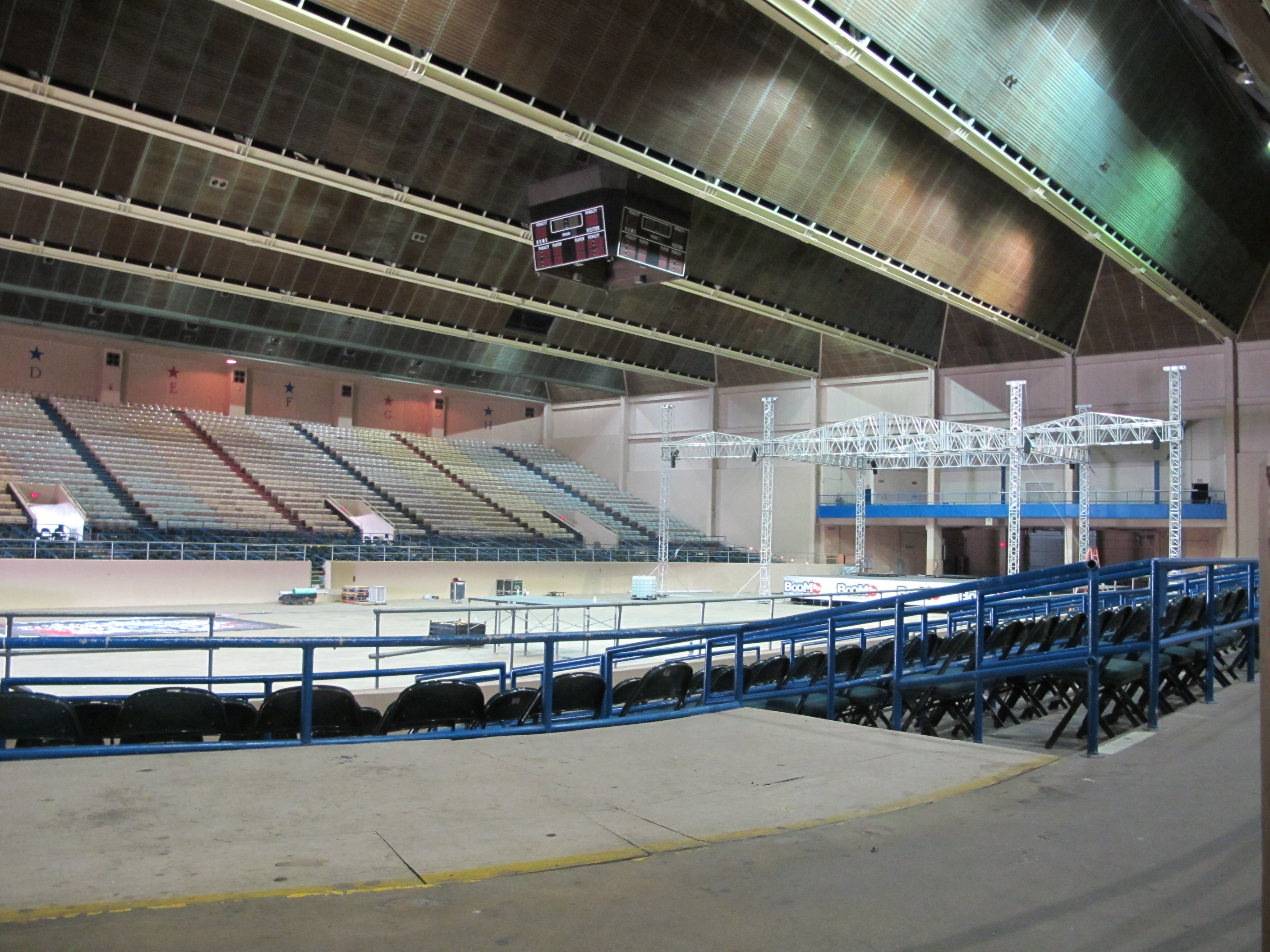
Fair Park Coliseum (Inside)

Fair Park Coliseum is an 8,513-seat multi-purpose arena in Dallas, Texas (USA) on the Fair Park grounds. It was home to the Dallas Black Hawks ice hockey team and Dallas Chaparrals basketball team. It was built in 1955. It was also home to the new ABA's Dallas Generals for the 2009–2010 season before the franchise folded.

The State Fair Coliseum was the home of the Rodeo Cowboys Association's inaugural National Finals Rodeo in 1959, and remained there through 1961.

The Dallas Tornado soccer club hosted the four-team regionals of the 1975 NASL Indoor tournament.

During the 1984 Dallas Grand Prix Formula One race held at Fair Park, the Coliseum doubled as the pit paddock for the Formula One teams in the Grand Prix.

From March 26, 2011, to 2013, the Coliseum was home to Dallas' own women's roller derby league, Assassination City Roller Derby of the Women's Flat Track Derby Association.

Beginning in 2026, the coliseum was the location of the Chevrolet main stage, moving the headlining acts from outdoors to indoors.

Preceded by first arena	Home of the Dallas Chaparrals; 1967 – 1973	Succeeded by HemisFair Arena
