= Jerry Williams (basketball) =

American basketball player

Winnipeg Sea Bears
- Position: Assistant coach
- League: CEBL

Personal information
- Born: January 2, 1979 (age 47) Jacksonville, Florida, U.S.
- Listed height: 6 ft 6 in (1.98 m)

Career information
- College: Cumberland College (2000–2001)
- Playing career: 2002–2008
- Coaching career: 2011–present

Career history

Playing
- 2002: Florida Sea Dragons (USBL) Free Agents Camp
- 2002–2003: Sheffield Sharks (ENG-BBL)
- 2003–2004: Scottish Rocks (ENG-BBL)
- 2004–2005: London Towers (ENG-BBL)
- 2005–2006: JDA Dijon Bourgogne (FRA-ProA)
- 2006: And1 Summer League in Jesolo (Venice) (Italy)
- 2006–2007: Jacksonville Jam (ABA)
- 2008: Jacksonville Jam (PBL)

Coaching
- 2011: All-Star Giants (AAU 2011-2011) Head Coach
- 2010–2015: Jacksonville Giants (ABA) Assistant Coach
- 2016–2021: Jacksonville Giants (ABA) Head Coach
- 2021–2024: Newfoundland Rogues Head Coach
- 2024: London Lightning Head Coach
- 2025–present: Winnipeg Sea Bears Assistant Coach

Career highlights
- All-NAIA 1st Team- 2001; British BBL Champion- 2003; British BBL Regular Season Champion- 2003; British BBL Cup Finalist- 2004; British BBL Player of the Year- 2004; ABA All-Star- 2007; 2012 ABA National Champions Jacksonville Giants Ring (assistant coach); 2013 Cumberland College Hall of Fame Inductee; 2016 ABA National Champions Jacksonville Giants Ring (Associate Head Coach); 2017 ABA National Champions Jacksonville Giants Ring (head coach); 2018 ABA National Champions Jacksonville Giants Ring (head coach); 2019 ABA National Champions Jacksonville Giants Ring (head coach); 2021 ABA National Champions Jacksonville Giants Ring (head coach); 3 Time National Coach of the Year ABA (head coach)

Jerry Williams (born January 2, 1979) is an American former professional basketball player and current Assistant basketball coach for the Winnipeg Sea Bears of the Canadian Elite Basketball League and former head coach for the ABA Jacksonville Giants in Jacksonville, Florida (USA). He had a distinguished college and European career, and played in the ABA (ABA) for 2 seasons, from 2007–2008. He played for the ABA Jacksonville Jam. A 6'6" shooting guard/small forward from Cumberland College, he was selected to the 2007 ABA All-Star Game.

Williams is the only head coach in ABA history to win a 3-peat championship in his first 3 years as head coach. Williams also was able to 4 peat in 2021 after the season ending in 2020 due to Covid-19, where the Giants were 25 and 1 heading into the playoffs.

From 2002 to 2007, Williams played in the British Basketball League. He was named Player of the Year in 2004, after a season in which he averaged 23.3 points per game for the Scottish Rocks. Jerry's nickname is "Mouse."

He is the brother of NFL superstar Rashean Mathis of the Jacksonville Jaguars.

== Hall of Fame ==
February 2013, Williams was inducted into his Cumberland College Hall of Fame.
