= Dallas Impact =

US professional basketball team

- Founded: 2010
- League: ABA
- Team history: Dallas Impact (2010-present)
- Based in: Dallas, Texas
- Arena: Lakewest Family YMCA
- Colors: Black, purple, orange
- Owner: Don Carter, Brady Cooper, Korey Mack, & David Washington
- Head coach: David Washington
- Championships: 0

The Dallas Impact was a team in the American Basketball Association which began play in the 2010-2011 season. The Impact is based in Dallas, Texas. This team replaces the failed Dallas Generals franchise which competed briefly in the 2009-2010 season. Despite replacing the Dallas Generals, the Impact are also a team that has folded in the ABA.

== History ==
=== 2010 ===
With their second win on December 1 to improve to 2-4, they defeated the North Texas Fresh 140-119, using a 48-point third quarter to pull away and forced 29 turnovers.
