= Shagari Alleyne =

American basketball player

Personal information
- Born: January 14, 1984 (age 41) The Bronx, New York, U.S.
- Listed height: 7 ft 3 in (2.21 m)
- Listed weight: 270 lb (122 kg)

Career information
- High school: Rice (Harlem, New York)
- College: Kentucky (2003–2006); Manhattan (2006–2007)
- NBA draft: 2007: undrafted
- Playing career: 2007–2016
- Position: Center

Career history
- 2008–2009: Harlem Globetrotters
- 2009: Tromsø Storm
- 2009–2010: Halifax Rainmen
- 2009–2010: Albuquerque Thunderbirds
- 2011: New York Wizards
- 2011–2012: Lake Michigan Admirals
- 2012–2013: Albany Legends
- 2013–2014: New York Jamm

Shagari Alleyne (born January 14, 1984) is an American former basketball center that last played for the New York Jamm of the Premier Basketball League in 2014.

He played three years for the University of Kentucky Wildcats before transferring to Manhattan College. Because he was a transfer, he was forced to sit out his senior season. In 2007, he entered the NBA Draft, but went undrafted. Standing at 7'3", he was the tallest player ever for his respective schools.

In 2008, Alleyne was invited to the Harlem Globetrotters' training camp. He was given the nickname "Skyscraper".

On November 17, 2011, Alleyne was selected by the Lake Michigan Admirals with the first pick in the Premier Basketball League draft.
