= Jacksonville Bluewaves =

- Founded: 2009
- League: WBA
- Team history: Jacksonville Bluewaves (2010-present)
- Based in: Jacksonville, Florida
- Arena: Edward Waters College
- Colors: Blue, white, black
- Owners: Kevin Waters Tony Pullins James Schlefstein Kenya Santiago
- Head coach: Kevin Waters
- Championships: 0

The Jacksonville Bluewaves were a basketball team based in Jacksonville, Florida, U.S. They played in the World Basketball Association, a small league with six teams in Florida and Georgia, in the 2010 season. In July 2010, it was announced that the Bluewaves would be joining the new American Basketball Association the next season under head coach and owner Kevin Waters. Later, however, it was announced that the Jacksonville ABA team would be a new franchise, with Waters serving as coach and general manager, and that the Bluewaves were defunct. The new team was eventually named the Jacksonville Giants. However, a team calling themselves the Jacksonville Bluewaves played some regular season games against teams in the Continental Basketball League in the summer of 2011.
