= Anthony Odunsi =

American-born Nigerian basketball player

Personal information
- Born: July 7, 1992 (age 34) Houston, Texas
- Listed height: 6 ft 4 in (1.93 m)
- Listed weight: 205 lb (93 kg)

Career information
- High school: Travis (Fort Bend County, Texas)
- College: University of Utah: Utah (2011–2012); Tyler JC (2012–2013); Albany (2013–2014); Houston Baptist (2014–2016)
- NBA draft: 2016: undrafted
- Playing career: 2016–present
- Position: point guard
- Number: 3

Career history
- 2017: Stjarnan
- 2017: Caen Basket Calvados
- 2018: Sandringham Sabres
- 2019: Manawatu Jets
Medals
Men's basketball
Representing Nigeria
AfroBasket
Silver medal – second place	2017 Tunisia/Senegal

Anthony Abayomi Odunsi (born July 7, 1992) is an American-born Nigerian professional basketball player who last played for the Manawatu Jets of the National Basketball League (NBL).

== High school and college career ==
Born in Houston, Texas, Odunsi attended Travis High School in Fort Bend County, Texas, before playing his freshman season of college basketball at Utah in 2011–12. His sophomore season was spent at Tyler Junior College before his junior season at Albany was reduced to just five games due to injury, as he was received a redshirt as well as a waiver from the NCAA, allowing him to compete for Houston Baptist in 2014–15 and 2015–16.

== Professional career ==
Coming out of college, Odunsi was drafted by the Canton Charge of the NBA G League, only to be waived by the team prior to the start of the 2016–17 season. In January 2017, he moved to Iceland to play for Stjarnan. In November 2017, he had a two-game stint in France with Caen Basket Calvados. In February 2018, he signed to play in Australia with the Sandringham Sabres. In March 2019, he signed to play in New Zealand with the Manawatu Jets. He appeared in two games before being released on 24 April.

== National team career ==
Odunsi has represented the Nigerian national team, making his debut at AfroBasket 2017.
