= Owensboro Sportscenter =

Indoor arena in Owensboro, Kentucky

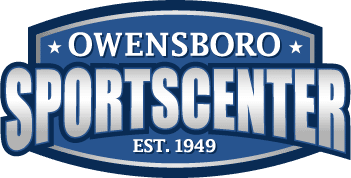
- Interactive map of Owensboro Sportscenter
- Address: 1215 Hickman Ave., Owensboro, KY; United States
- Coordinates: 37.762655°N 87.12634°W
- Owner: City of Owensboro
- Operator: Oak View Group
- Capacity: 5,000
- Type: Arena
- Current use: Basketball; Concerts

Construction
- Opened: 1949; 77 years ago

Tenants
- Kentucky Wesleyan Panthers (NCAA); Owensboro Catholic Aces (1951–present); Kentucky Bisons (ABA) (2008–2010); Kentucky Mavericks (PBL) (2016–2017); Owensboro Thoroughbreds (TBL) (2018–2022)

Website
- owensborosportscenter.com

The Owensboro Sportscenter is a 5,000-seat multi-purpose arena in Owensboro, Kentucky. The stadium hosts sporting events as well as concerts.

The Sportscenter is the home of the basketball teams of Kentucky Wesleyan College and Owensboro Catholic High School. It has been the home to three minor-pro basketball teams, the Kentucky Bisons, the Kentucky Mavericks and the Owensboro Thoroughbreds.

== Overview ==
In March 2016, the ECHL approved the relocation of the Evansville IceMen franchise to the Sportscenter, pending proposed renovations to the arena, and currently hoping to begin play in 2017. However, in August 2016, team owner Ron Geary still had not taken over management of the Sportscenter and the City of Owensboro announced Spectra would temporarily take over management of the Sportscenter on September 1 with a deadline for Geary set to September 30. If Geary has not begun management by the deadline, then Spectra will begin their own renovations and the agreement with the IceMen will be voided. On the September 30 deadline, Geary sent a letter to Owensboro mayor Ron Payne stating he would not be purchasing the Sportscenter because of too much cost to convert and refurbish the arena and Spectra became the official operators moving forward.

The Kentucky Knights, a proposed indoor American football squad, was to begin play at the arena in 2016 as part of the new North American Indoor Football. However, the team had to make an ownership change in late 2015 and then attempted to join Supreme Indoor Football but the Knights were never able to field a team and the SIF failed to launch in 2016.
