= 2002 ABA All-Star Game =

Exhibition basketball game

2006 ABA All-Star Game
Kansas City Knights	ABA All-Stars
161	138
- Date: April 14, 2002
- Venue: Kemper Arena, Kansas City
- MVP: Maurice Carter

The 2002 American Basketball Association All-Star Game was held at Kemper Arena in Kansas City, Missouri on Sunday April 14, 2002, at 4:15 p.m. Kansas City Knights defeated ABA All-Stars, by 161-138 in front of their home crowd. ABA chose the 2002 champions Kansas City Knights for the All-Star game instead of an East-West contest. The Knights had just won the 2nd ever ABA championship a month earlier. Maurice Carter of the Kansas City Knights won the MVP award

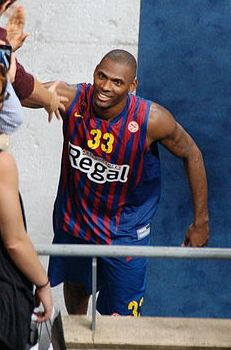
Pete Mickeal played for the Knights in the 2002 All-Star Game.

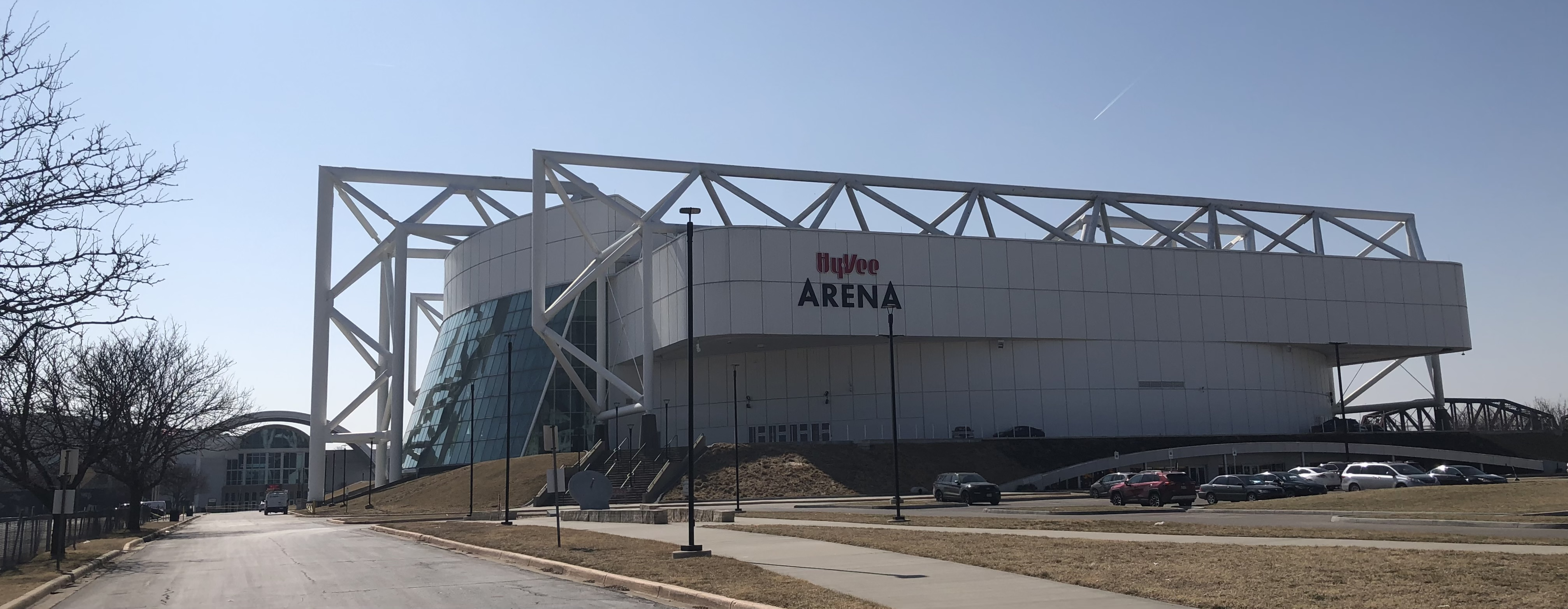
The Kemper Arena.

== The Game ==
Kansas City Knights won the ABA All Star Game, beating the ABA All-Stars 161-138, in front of 4,010 fans. Maurice Carter scored 46 points, including 14 in the fourth quarter when the Knights pulled away. John Ford, a center from Colorado State, and late-season addition for the Knights, scored 24 points.

== All-Star teams ==
=== Rosters ===
Kansas City Knights-

- Nick Bradford, G/F
- Maurice Carter, G
- John Ford, C
- Rick Hughes, F
- Pete Mickeal, F
- Ryan Sears, G
- Eric Taylor, F
- Maurice Trotter, G
- David Vanterpool, G/F
- Rex Walters, G
- Jason Williams, F
  Coach: Kevin Pritchard

== Awards ==
MVP	Topscorer
(United States) Pete Mickeal	(United States) Maurice Carter

== See also ==
- 2005 ABA All-Star Game
