= Universal Basketball Association =

US basketball minor league

Universal Basketball Association (UBA)
- Sport: Basketball
- Founded: 2009
- No. of teams: 24
- Country: United States
- Continent: FIBA Americas (Americas)
- Most recent champion: Oklahoma Outlaws (2016)
- Most titles: GIE Maile Matrix (5)
- Website: UBAnow.com

The Universal Basketball Association (UBA) is a semi-professional men's basketball minor league in the United States that began play in 2009. The league typically play a Spring season schedule.

Teams are split into geographical divisions, from Georgia, Indiana, Kentucky, North Carolina, Ohio and Texas.

== History ==
UBA announced the addition of an Eastern division scheduled to begin in 2015. Teams are based in North Carolina.

== Teams ==
Team	City	Arena	Founded
Eastern Conference			
Carolina Cougars	Rocky Mount, North Carolina		2014
Charlotte Fury	Charlotte, North Carolina		2014
Queen City Bulls	Charlotte, North Carolina		2014
Wilkes County Flames	Wilkesboro, North Carolina	Lincoln Heights High School	2014
Winston Savage	Winston, North Carolina		
Midwestern Conference			
Midwest Ballers	El Reno, Oklahoma	OnPoint Hoops	
Oklahoma Attack	El Reno, Oklahoma	OnPoint Hoops	
Oklahoma Outlaws	El Reno, Oklahoma	OnPoint Hoops	2015
Oklahoma City Hoops	El Reno, Oklahoma	OnPoint Hoops	
Northern Conference			
Central Indiana Seminoles	Anderson, Indiana		
Cin-City Titans	Cincinnati, Ohio	Woodward High School	
Cincinnati Redhawks	Cincinnati, Ohio	Woodward High School	
Indiana Generals	Elizabeth, Indiana		2013
Kentucky Waves	Louisville, Kentucky		2015
Southern Conference			
Atlanta Legends	Jonesboro, Georgia		2010
Georgia PRIME	Atlanta, Georgia		2013
Georgia RIZE	Atlanta, Georgia		
Georgia Spartans	Atlanta, Georgia	Andrew & Walter Young YMCA	2013
GIE Maile Matrix	Morrow, Georgia		2009
Southern Generals	Newnan, Georgia		2009
Atlanta Kings	Atlanta, Georgia	Andrew & Walter Young YMCA	2019
Western Conference			
Cleveland Havok	Cleveland, Texas		2011
Fort Worth FIRM	Fort Worth, Texas		2015
North Texas Fresh	Fort Worth, Texas	Crowley Middle School	2013
Texas Cyclones	Fort Worth, Texas	Bertha Collins Recreation Center	2010
UBA D-League			
Baytown Bandits	Kingwood, Texas		
Houston Warriors	Houston, Texas		
International Elite Academy	Atlanta, Georgia	Dominique Wilkins Gym	
Sugar Land Vipers	Sugar Land, Texas		

== Champions ==
Season	Champion	Runner-up	Result
2009	DFW Disciples	Irving Assault	133-130
2010	GEI Morrow Disciples	Southern Generals	95-88
2011	Southern Generals	Atlanta Assault	111-92
2012	GIE Maile Matrix	Georgia Legends	101-83
2013	GIE Maile Matrix	Georgia PRIME	104-88
2014	Georgia PRIME	DFW Stars	84-83
2015	GIE Maile Matrix	Georgia PRIME	82-76
2015-16	Oklahoma Outlaws	Fort Worth FIRM	69-63
