= Lake Michigan Admirals =

- Founded: 2009
- League: ABA (2009–2011); PBL (2012–present)
- Team history: Lake Michigan Admirals (2009–present)
- Based in: St. Joseph, Michigan
- Arena: St. Joseph High School
- Colors: Black, gold, white, silver
- Owner: Chris Glisson
- Head coach: Ace Jackson, Armando Villanueva
- Championships: Midwest Champions 2015,2016
- Dancers: The Lady Admirals

The Lake Michigan Admirals were a team of the Premier Basketball League that began play in the 2009-10 season as a member of the American Basketball Association. The Admirals are the second ABA team based in Berrien County, Michigan, after the Benton Harbor-based Twin City Ballers folded after their only season of 2006–07. The Admirals played 15 home games, 10 in Lake Michigan Catholic High School in Saint Joseph, Michigan and 5 at Benton Harbor High School in Benton Harbor, Michigan.

The Admirals are owned by Chris Glisson, former co-owner of fellow ABA teams the Smoky Mountain Jam and Tri-City Racers. Glisson hoped to set up a similar arena for the Admirals in time for the 2019 season but failed to do so. After the team folded, Glisson was arrested in the spring of 2020, while working with the Boys and Girls club for allegedly assaulting a student at the high school he was assigned to and subsequently resigned from the organization.

The Admirals finished their inaugural 2009-2010 season with 13 wins and 7 losses, with a 122–117 loss to North Division rivals Chicago Steam in the Division Championship Game. Captain and forward Dominick Melton was named to the ABA East All Star team, with Odgra Bobo, Antonio Griffin and Brandon Ball all honorary mentions in All Star voting.

For the 2012 season, the Admirals joined the Premier Basketball League.

In October 2014, the Admirals signed Bob Wegner, who at 7'8" has claimed to be the world's tallest professional athlete.

In 2015 and 2016, the Admirals were back to back PBL Midwest Champions.

The focus of the Lake Michigan Admirals is to help prepare players mentally, physically, and spiritually before going to the next level. Owner Chris Glisson has helped 86 players get signed to over 58 different countries since 2009.

== History season results ==
- 2009-2010 (14-6)
- 2010-2011 (22-6)
- 2011-2012 (4-14)
- 2012-2013 (4-11)
- 2013-2014 (6-12)
- 2014-2015 (12-4)
- 2016 (10-8)

== Head coaches ==
- Michael "Ace" Jackson (2014–present)
- Jonathan Solomon (2014)
- Michael "Ace" Jackson (2012-2013)
- Che' D Eddie (2010–2012)
- Buck Riley (2009-2010)
- Mike Ahrens (2009)
- Buck Riley

== 2014 roster ==
#		Ht.	Player	College
1	(United States)	6'7	Odgra Bobo	Oakland Community College
1	(United States)	6'6	Terrance Shaw	Ferris State
3	(United States)	6'3	Kahlil McDonald	Western Kentucky
4	(United States)	6'5	Reid Houston	Genesee CC
4	(United States)	6'11	Hamidu Rahman	New Mexico State
4	(United States)	6'5	Courtney Smith	Sienna Heights
5	(United States)	6'2	Kenny Brown	Ferris State
8	(United States)	6'10	Lester Ferguson	Robert Morris (IL)
8	(United States)	6'7	Larry Logan	Centenary
9	(United States)	6'4	Corvonn Gaines	East Carolina
9	(United States)	6'9	Eladio Espinosa	South Florida
10	(United States)	6'0	Maurice Benson	Indiana Tech
12	(United States)	6'0	Corey Neeley	Concord University
15	(United States)	5'9	Scott Odom	Fort Worth, Texas
15	(United States)	6'0	Kwan Waller	Kentucky Wesleyan
15	(United States)	5'8	Desmond Wade	University of Houston
15	(United States)	6'6	Fred Harris	West Virginia State
15	(United States)	6'8	Shimeek Johnson	St. Edward's University
23	(United States)	6'10	Stan Simpson	Memphis
23	(United States)	6'8	Shane Ross	Toledo
25	(United States)	6'6	Florentino Valencia	Toledo
25	(United States)	7'2	John Riek	Mississippi State
33	(United States)	6'3	Courtney Blackmore	Ferris State
32	(United States)	6'10	Waki Williams	Memphis

== 2011-12 roster ==
#		Ht.	Player	College
2	(United States)	6'1	Greg Plater	Long Beach State
3	(United States)	6'1	Steve Strong	Robert Morris
4	(United States)	6'5	Pete Trammell	Grand Valley State
5	(United States)	6'7	Rodney Alexander	Illinois
10	(United States)	6'4	Romain Martin	Eastern Illinois
14	(United States)	6'11	Garrett Schmidt	Urbana
15	(United States)	5'7	Ogdra Bobo	Oakland CC
21	(United States)	7'3	Shagari Alleyne	Kentucky
23	(United States)	6'1	Ryan Young	Concordia Chicago
24	(United States)	5'10	Jay McCree	Lake Michigan College
25	(United States)	6'1	Scotty Samarco	Pikeville
33	(United States)	6'3	Courtney Blackmore	Ferris State
42	(United States)	6'6	Florentino Valencia	Toledo

== 2010-11 season schedule ==
Date	Opponent	Home/away	Score	High points	High rebounds	High assists	Location	Record
December 4	Seattle Mountaineers	Home	107-105	Dominick Melton (23), Odgra Bobo (23)	Larry Logan (7)	Steve Strong (4)	Lake Michigan Catholic High School	1-0
December 5	Seattle Mountaineers	Home	84-100	Odgra Bobo (18)	DeAngelo Johnson (6), Dominick Melton (6)	Steve Strong (4)	Lake Michigan Catholic High School	1-1
December 11	West Virginia Blazers	Home	129-131	Dominick Melton (35)	DeAngelo Johnson (12)	Steve Strong (9)	Lake Michigan Catholic High School	1-2
December 12	West Virginia Blazers	Home	115-103	Odgra Bobo (31)	Odgra Bobo (10)	Steve Strong (7)	Coloma High School	2-2
December 18	Detroit Hoops	Home	126-111	Dominick Melton (27)	Larry Logan (11)	Odgra Bobo (10)	Lake Michigan Catholic High School	3-2
January 9	Chicago Steam	Away	117-112	Odgra Bobo (28)			South Suburban College	3-3
January 15	Indiana Diesels	Away	124-112					4-3
January 22	NWI Magical Stars	Home	131-106	Odgra Bobo (25)			Lake Michigan Catholic High School	5-3
January 23	NWI Magical Stars	Home	111-106	Odgra Bobo (26)	Odgra Bobo (14)	Odgra Bobo (4), Allen White (4)	Bangor High School	6-3
January 29	Detroit Hoops	Away	119-107	Odgra Bobo (25)		Odgra Bobo (8)	Ernest T. Ford Recreation Center, 5:30 pm	7-3
February 5	Chicago Steam	Home	100-104	Odgra Bobo (25)	Larry Logan (11)	Odgra Bobo (5)	Lake Michigan Catholic High School, 7 pm	7-4
February 12	NWI Magical Stars	Home	111-117	Odgra Bobo (28)	Gus Chase (11), Larry Logan (11)	Brandon Ball (6), Odgra Bobo (6)	Lake Michigan Catholic High School, 7 pm	7-5
February 19	Michiana Monarchs	Home	140-112	Gus Chase (31)	Gus Chase (13)	Brandon Ball (10)	Lake Michigan Catholic High School, 7 pm	8-5
February 20	Michiana Monarchs	Away	128-109	Steve Strong (32)	Gus Chase (16)	Brandon Ball (10)	Michigan Lutheran, 3 pm	9-5
February 26	ABA All-Star Game	Away					Jacksonville, FL	
February 27	Detroit Hoops	Home	143-111	Gus Chase (25)	Gus Chase (9), Eddie Spencer (9)	Jay McCree (9)	Benton Harbor High School, 3 pm	10-5
March 2	Benton Harbor All-Stars	Home	162-112	Odgra Bobo (35)	Gus Chase (9)	Brandon Ball (9), Odgra Bobo (9), Gus Chase (9), Steve Strong (9)	Eau Claire High School, 6:30 pm	11-5
March 6	NWI Magical Stars, Tournament	Away	112-104	Odgra Bobo (29)	Odgra Bobo (13)	Brandon Ball (8)	Bangor High School, 3 pm	12-5
March 12	Chicago Steam, North Central Divisional Championship	Away	121-98	Steve Strong (28)	Gus Chase (16)	Brandon Ball (10)	South Suburban College, South Holland, IL, 7:15 pm (CST)	13-5
March 19	Seven City Knights	Away					Pike County Central HS, Pikeville, KY, 5 pm	
