= South Carolina Warriors =

Basketball team in Myrtle Beach, South Carolina

- Founded: 2011
- League: American Basketball Association
- Team history: South Carolina Warriors (2011–13)
- Based in: Myrtle Beach, South Carolina
- Arena: Carolina Forest Recreation Center
- Colors: Blue, Purple, Black, Gray
- Owner: Leonard R. Watts and J. Marshall Biddle
- Head coach: John Kefalas
- Championships: 0
- Cheerleaders: Warrior Girls
- Dancers: Lady Warriors Dance Team
- Mascot: Wags The Warrior Dog
- Website: http://www.scwarriorsbasketball.com/

The South Carolina Warriors were a semi-professional basketball team based in Myrtle Beach, South Carolina. It was an expansion franchise team of the American Basketball Association in the Mid-Atlantic Conference. The team began play in the 2011–12 season.

== Team history ==
In early August 2011, The American Basketball Association (ABA) announced that it has added the South Carolina Warriors, an expansion team in Myrtle Beach, South Carolina, for its 2011–2012 season. The South Carolina Warriors would be owned by Indianapolis-based Platinum Entertainment Group LLC/Dymond Recodz (PEG) and would have its first home game at the Myrtle Beach Convention Center.

On November 24, 2011, the team announced that starting December 3, 2011, all of the team's home games would be played at the Little River Recreation Center.

On February 25, 2012, the team was sold. It had been owned and operated by Tony Bennett through two different companies. It was sold to a couple investors in South Carolina.

In their inaugural season, The Warriors won every game in the regular season, then beat the Carolina Cheetahs in the playoffs, Lynchburg Legends in the Mid Atlantic Championship, Connecticut Topballers in the ABA Elite Eight, the North Dallas Vandals and Jacksonville Giants for a 29–0 record before losing 2–0 in a best-of-three series to the Jacksonville Giants in the ABA finals.

On October 28, 2012, it was announced that the Warriors had been sold again. Its new owners were local businessmen Leonard R. Watts and J. Marshall Biddle. John Kefalas was promoted from being an assistant to head coach after Chris Beard, the head coach for the inaugural season, left to pursue other coaching opportunities, eventually becoming the head coach at the University of Texas. Kefalas was an assistant coach at Coastal Carolina under Pete Strickland.

== 2012–13 season schedule ==
- Regular Season: 17–1 (Home: 16–0 | Away: 2–1)
- Cancelled Games: 5 (By other teams due to technicalities)
- In the results column, the first score listed is the Warriors.

South Carolina Warriors 2012–13 Season Schedule
Date	Opponent	Location	Result
11/3/2012	@ Gainesville Heat	Gainesville, Georgia	Cancelled
11/8/2012	East Point Jaguars	Carolina Forest Recreation Center	137–97
11/10/2012	Tennessee Halo's	Carolina Forest Recreation Center	161–82
11/11/2012	@ Palmetto State Rizers	Columbia, South Carolina	Cancelled
11/17/2012	Gainesville Heat	Carolina Forest Recreation Center	136–113
11/18/2012	Fayetteville Flight	Carolina Forest Recreation Center	121–106
11/25/2012	@ Palmetto State Rizers	Columbia, South Carolina	116 -92
11/30/2012	Shizuoka Gymrats	Carolina Forest Recreation Center	121–106
12/1/2012	Lynchburg Legends	Carolina Forest Recreation Center	Cancelled
12/2/2012	Palmetto State Rizers	Carolina Forest Recreation Center	144–130
12/4/2012	Shizuoka Gymrats	Carolina Forest Recreation Center	159–83
12/8/2012	Jacksonville Giants	Jacksonville, Florida	112-116
12/11/2012	@ Fayetteville Flight	Fayetteville, North Carolina	Cancelled
12/15/2012	Greenville Galaxy	Carolina Forest Recreation Center	124–100
12/16/2012	Gainesville Heat	Carolina Forest Recreation Center	124–100
1/5/2013	Richmond Elite	Carolina Forest Recreation Center	111–105
1/6/2013	Atlanta Aliens	Carolina Forest Recreation Center	121–117
1/12/2013	Hampton Roads Stallions	Carolina Forest Recreation Center	138–72
1/13/2013	Hampton Roads Stallions	Carolina Forest Recreation Center	128–83
1/19/2012	@ Lynchburg Legends	Lynchburg, Virginia	125–123
1/22/2013	Fayetteville Flight	Carolina Forest Recreation Center	152–118
1/24/2013	@ Greenville Galaxy	Greenville, South Carolina	No score available
1/26/2013	Palmetto State Rizers	Carolina Forest Recreation Center	126–103
2/2/2013	Fayetteville Flight	Carolina Forest Recreation Center	
2/13/2013	Greenville Galaxy	Carolina Forest Recreation Center	
2/16/2013	Hampton Roads Stallions	Carolina Forest Recreation Center	
2/17/2013	Atlanta Wildcats	Carolina Forest Recreation Center	
2/23/2013	@Lynchburg Legends	Lynchburg, Virginia	
3/3/2013	Palmetto State Rizers	Carolina Forest Recreation Center	Cancelled
3/7/2013	Greenville Galaxy	Greenville, South Carolina |	
3/9/2013	Atlanta Aliens	Richmond, Virginia	
3/16/2013	Richmond Elite	Lynchburg, Virginia	
3/23/2013	Palmetto State Rizers	Carolina Forest Recreation Center	
3/30/2013	Palmetto State Rizers	Carolina Forest Recreation Center	

== Season-by-season record ==
Season	Total Games	Wins	Losses	Results
2011–12	31	29	2	Lost to Jacksonville Giants in finals, 100–91
2012–13	19	17	1	At least 5 games cancelled due to technicalities/ 1 game no score available

== Head coaches ==
Years	Coach Name	Record
2011–12	Chris Beard	29–2
2012–13	John Kefalas	17–1

== 2012–13 roster and former players ==
2012–13 Player Roster
Number:	Players Name:	Position	Height	Weight	Hometown	College	Graduation Year
0	Tim Ware	F	6'7"	214 lbs	Elba, Alabama	Lindsey Wilson College	2010
1	Shaquille Johnson	G	6'5"	170 lbs	Jacksonville, Florida	Marshall University	2012
3	Mike Vogler	PG	6'0"	180 lbs	Lynn Haven, Florida	Troy University	2010
4	Jarred Stockton	G	6'5"	240 lbs	Jacksonville, Florida	Jacksonville University	2008
10	Gerry Wood	G/F	6'8"	210 lbs	Salisbury, North Carolina	Greensboro College	2004
11	Sherod Harris	G	5'10"	160 lbs	Rochester, New York	Brocksport State	2010
15	Pat Lewis	G/F	6'5"	195 lbs	Hemingway, South Carolina	Cape Fear Community College	2008
20	LaShun Watson	G/F	6'6"	212 lbs	Greenville, Georgia	University of South Alabama	2010
23	Kellen Brand	G	6'1"	188 lbs	High Point, North Carolina	Appalachian State University	2010
25	Matt Kendrick	C	7'0"	235 lbs	Tampa, Florida	Saint Leo University	2010
30	Brenden Knox	F/C	6'10"	230 lbs	Georgetown, South Carolina	Auburn University	2010
33	Emanuel Jackson	F	6'9"	230 lbs	Atlanta, Georgia	Stephen F. Austin State University	2001
33	Berry Jordan	f	6'8"	230 lbs	Jacksonville, FL	University of Arkansas	2006
40	Marquise Gainous	F/C	6'10"	230 lbs	Orlando, FL	Texas Christian University	2000
44	Dustin Scott	C	6'8"	230 lbs	Charleston, South Carolina	College of Charleston	2009

Former Players
Player #	Player name	Position	Height	Weight	Notes
0	Jo Harris	F/G	5'4	155	
1	John Roberson	G	5'10"	180	
10	Tony White Jr	G	6'0"	160	
25	Josh Fowler	F	6'9"	225	
20	Jerome Richardson	G	6'5"	215	
33	Perry Stevenson	F	6'9"	220	
11	David Long	G/F	6'4"	185	
4	Marquis Gilstrap	F	6'7"	220	
23	Grant Maxey	F	6'5"	210	
---	Kellen Brand				
---	Markhuri Sanders-Frison				
---	Jack Leasure				Later played in New Zealand
---	Mario Edwards				Later played in Kosovo
---	John Fowler				
---	Colin Stevens				

== Awards received ==
Year	Award name	Head coach
2012	Mid-Atlantic Conference Champions	John Kefalas
2012	National Division Champions	John Kefalas
