= Kansas City Soul =

American basketball team

- Founded: 2010
- League: ABA
- Based in: Kansas City, Kansas
- Arena: Truman Memorial Building
- Colors: Red and white
- Owner: Bryant Tucker Sr.
- Championships: none
- Cheerleaders: Diamond Dolls

The Kansas City Soul were an American basketball team who played in the American Basketball Association professional league. Based in suburban Kansas City the team began play in the 2011-12 ABA season. The Soul played their home games at Grandview Christian School in Grandview, Missouri.

== History ==
Established in 2010 as the Missouri Rhythm, the team made it to the ABA Playoffs its first season, losing to the Conway Cyclones 146–114 in the first round.

The Rhythm played host to the ABA All-Star Game on 19 April 2014.

The team announced in May 2016 it was rebranding as the Kansas City Soul.

== Season-by-season record ==
Season	W	L	Division finish	Playoffs W-L	Result
2011-12	3	4	5th (of five)	0-1	Lost in 1st Round
2012-13	4	3	3rd (of four)	0-0	DNQ
2013-14	5	3	4th (of six)	0-0	DNQ
