= Pittsburgh Phantoms (ABA) =

Defunct American professional basketball team

- Founded: 2009
- League: GPBL (planning stages); ABA (2009–10)
- Team history: Pittsburgh Phantoms (2009–2010)
- Based in: Elizabeth, Pennsylvania
- Arena: Carnegie Library of Homestead, Langley High School
- Colors: Black, gold, white
- Owner: Pittsburgh Professional Basketball Group (Bill Miller, Ted Miller, Lisa Matthews)
- Head coach: John Ashalou

The Pittsburgh Phantoms were an American professional basketball team whose office is based in the Pittsburgh suburb of Elizabeth, Pennsylvania. The Phantoms were a member of the current American Basketball Association, and began play in December, 2009. The Phantoms played their home games in Munhall, Pennsylvania at the Carnegie Library of Homestead - Athletic Club as well as the Langley High School Gymnasium. Although the Phantoms intended to play games in the ABA during the 2010-11 season, no games were held. Despite problems with games not being held they did garner some fan support.

The Phantoms had originally planned to be a charter member of the Global Professional Basketball League before leaving for the ABA.

== Year-by-year ==
Year	W	L	Win %	Finish
2009-10	6	2	0.750	4th, ABA North Central Division
