= Our Lady of the Lake Catholic High School =

Location
- 915 Pleasant Street; St. Joseph, (Berrien County), Michigan 49085; United States; 42°6′29″N 86°28′41″W

Information
- Type: Parochial, Coeducational
- Religious affiliation: Roman Catholic
- Established: 1969
- Principal: Anna Reed
- Pastor: Fr. John Fleckenstein
- Chaplain: Fr. Jack Pfeiffer
- Grades: 9–12
- Colors: Royal Blue, Gold and White
- Athletics conference: BCS League
- Mascot: Laker Monster
- Team name: Lakers
- National ranking: Top 50 Catholic High Schools of America
- Student-Teacher Ratio: 8:1
- Athletic Director: Phil McDonald
- Website: http://www.lmclakers.com

Our Lady of the Lake Catholic High School is a parochial, Roman Catholic high school in St. Joseph, Michigan. It is located in the Roman Catholic Diocese of Kalamazoo. Prior to the 2022-2023 school year, the school was named Lake Michigan Catholic High School.

Our Lady of the Lake Catholic High School was formed by the merger of St. John and St. Joseph Catholic Schools in 1969. Since then, the high school has been part of a PS-12 school system serving Southwestern Michigan in the Catholic education tradition. The school system is supported by the parishes of St. John, St. Bernard, and St. Joseph and the Twin-City Area Catholic School Fund, Inc.

Our Lady of the Lake Catholic Schools are a part of the educational system established by the Diocese of Kalamazoo, MI and are subject to the policies of the Diocesan Office of Schools. The school is accredited by the Michigan Association of Non-Public Schools. In accordance with Title IX compliance, Our Lady of the Lake Catholic Schools do not discriminate on the basis of sex, religious affiliation, race, color, physical challenges, or national origin in admissions or employment opportunities.

== Athletics ==
Basketball

- Girls state Championships: 1988
