= Dallas Generals =

- League: ABA 2009–2010
- Founded: 2009
- History: Dallas Generals; 2009–2010
- Arena: Fair Park Coliseum
- Location: Dallas, Texas
- Team colors: red, white, blue
- Head coach: Chris Terrell
- Ownership: Keio Gamble

The Dallas Generals was a team of the American Basketball Association that began play in the 2009–10 season. The franchise was owned by entertainment industry veteran Keio Gamble. The team's home games were played at Fair Park Coliseum in Dallas, Texas. The team ceased operations in January 2010.

== History ==
The team's first head coach was Chris Terrell of Southern California; former coach of Mexico's LNBP.

Their flagship players were streetball veteran Taurian Fontenette, better known as "Mr. 720" and "The Air Up There", and NBA veteran Anthony "Pig" Miller. Other players included Dallas native Jonathan Walker.

The team took "a momentary step back from operations" in order to reorganize. They announced their intention to resume play with a home game on January 2, 2010. Later in January 2010, the team announced it was ceasing operations for the remainder of the 2009–2010 season, refunding tickets, and regrouping to return for the 2010–11 season.

== See also ==
- Dallas Impact
