= Kayode Ayeni =

American professional basketball player

No. 1 – MAS Fes
- Position: Forward
- League: Qatari Basketball League

Personal information
- Born: July 27, 1987 (age 39) Brooklyn, New York, U.S.
- Listed height: 6 ft 5 in (1.96 m)

Career information
- High school: Laurinburg Institute (Laurinburg, North Carolina)
- College: St. Francis Brooklyn (2006–2010)
- NBA draft: 2010: undrafted
- Playing career: 2010–present

Career history
- 2012–2013: Al Wakrah
- 2016–2017: Al Wakrah
- 2017–present: MAS Fes

Career highlights
- 2011 ABA All Star-Game MVP

Kayode Olatukombo Ayeni (born 27 July 1987) is an American professional basketball player who plays for the MAS Fes club of the Nationale 1, the first division of professional basketball in Morocco.

Before he joined MAS Fes, he played for the Al Wakrah club of the Qatari Basketball League.
