= Georgia Razors =

- Founded: 2011
- League: American Basketball Association
- Team history: Athens Razors (2011-2012) Georgia Razors (2012-2013)
- Based in: Athens, Georgia
- Arena: Clarke Central High School
- Head coach: Lionel Garrett
- Championships: 0
- Mascot: Blade

The Georgia Razors are an expansion franchise of the American Basketball Association which began play in the 2011–2012 season.

The Razors are currently slated to play home games at the Clarke Central High School gymnasium. The Razors first home game took place on Saturday November 26, 2011 at 7pm against the East Point Jaguars, which they won, 107–98. The next week they also played them and won again, 148–104.

The team is currently led by head coach Lionel Garrett, a former Harlem Globetrotter.

The team finished the 2011–2012 season with a Division Title in the Atlantic South Division of the ABA. Notable players included Chris Barnes and Levi Stukes of the University of Georgia. The team was also aided by Senario Hillman of the University of Alabama and Jon Mandeldove of UCONN.

The team was Coached by Lionel Garrett as well as assisted by Coach Chris Wilson and Coach Brandon Clay.
