= Jermaine Bell =

Montserratian footballer

Personal information
- Position: Defender

Senior career*
Years	Team	Apps	(Gls)
2014–2015	Williamstown SC		(4)
2015–2016	Shoreham		
2016–	Diamond Valley United		

International career
2014	Montserrat	2	(0)
- * Club domestic league appearances and goals

Jermaine Bell is a Montserratian footballer who played as a Winger for Yarraville Glory.

== Career ==
In 2014, Bell signed for Australian sixth tier side Williamstown SC. In 2015, he signed for Shoreham in the English ninth tier. After that, he signed for Australian fifth tier club Diamond Valley United. in 2017 and 18 he played for Australian side Western Suburbs. 2019 he played for Brunswick United for a short period. 2021 he played for Australian fourth tier Yarraville Glory.
