= Colorado Cougars =

- Founded: 2011
- League: ABA
- Team history: Colorado Cougars (2011-2013)
- Based in: Loveland, Colorado
- Arena: Loveland High School
- Colors: Red, white, blue
- Owner: Patrick Kelly
- Championships: 0
- Dancers: Cougar Girls
- Local media: Greeley Daily Tribune

The Colorado Cougars are a team of the American Basketball Association which began play in the 2010–11 season. Based in Loveland, Colorado, the Cougars play their home games at Loveland High School.

Team owner Patrick Kelly was sent a cease and desist order by Colorado Securities Commissioner Fred Joseph over attempts to raise money for this team. Joseph alleges the way he was attempting to finance the team on Craigslist was a violation of the Colorado Securities Act. Kelly agreed with the order but did not admit or deny violating the law in the agreement.
