= Lynchburg Titans =

- Founded: 2010
- League: PBL
- Team history: Lynchburg Legends (2011-2013), Lynchburg Titans (2013-)
- Based in: Lynchburg, Virginia
- Arena: Lynchburg City Armory
- Colors: Dark red, black, white
- Owner: Lynchburg Legends, LLC
- Championships: 0

The Lynchburg Titans are a franchise of the Premier Basketball League which began play in the 2011–12 season. Based in Lynchburg, Virginia, they play their home games in Downtown Lynchburg at the Lynchburg City Armory.

The Titans competed in the American Basketball Association for two seasons, during which they were known as the Lynchburg Legends. As of October 18, 2013, the Legends debuted in the league's pre-season rankings at #21, the first time the Legends have appeared in the rankings.

The Titans will begin play in the PBL for the 2014 season.
