= Jacksonville Giants =

Professional minor-league basketball team in Jacksonville, Florida

- Founded: 2010
- Folded: 2022
- League: ABA (2010–2022)
- Team history: Jacksonville Giants (2010–2022)
- Based in: Jacksonville, Florida
- Arena: VyStar Veterans Memorial Arena
- Colors: Navy Blue, Orange
- Owner: Ron Sholes
- Head coach: Jerry "Mouse" Williams
- Championships: 7 (2012, 2013, 2016, 2017, 2018, 2019, 2021)
- Regional titles: 3 (2011, 2012, 2013)
- Dancers: Gems and Jewels
- Mascot: Mr. Biggs

The Jacksonville Giants were a professional minor league basketball team based in Jacksonville, Florida. They were the 2012, 2013, 2016, 2017, 2018, 2019 and 2021 National Champions of the new American Basketball Association (ABA), which they joined as an expansion team for the 2010–2011 season. They played the majority of their home games at VyStar Veterans Memorial Arena. In addition to their seven national championships, the Giants won regional titles in 2011, 2012, and 2013. In 2014, the team was recognized for their off-the-court achievements with the ABA National Charity Award for their work in the Jacksonville community.

== History ==
In May 2010 the American Basketball Association announced a new franchise based in Jacksonville would join the league for the 2010–2011 season. The name was announced as the Jacksonville Giants in November. The owner was Jacksonville attorney Ron Sholes, while the head coach and general manager was Kevin Waters, who previously owned and coached the Jacksonville Bluewaves of the World Basketball Association.

Jacksonville was home to an earlier ABA team, the Jacksonville Jam. The Jam played in the ABA for the 2006–2007 season before moving to the rival Premier Basketball League in 2008, but folded by the end of the season.

=== 2010–2011 ===
In 2010 owner Sholes stated that he hoped to avoid the fate of the Jam and other minor league basketball teams that have failed in Jacksonville with a more professional marketing strategy. He signed a contract with the city's major indoor venue, the Jacksonville Veterans Memorial Arena, to use for home games, and contracted with television and radio stations to broadcast games. The Giants debuted on December 4, 2010, defeating the San Francisco Rumble 182–124. They excelled on the court, going 23–0 in the regular season and advancing to the league playoffs, but were ultimately knocked out. They claimed an average attendance of 2000 in their inaugural season.

=== 2011–2012 ===
The Giants had their 2011–2012 opener on December 3, 2011, defeating the Gulf Coast Flash by 1 point on a buzzer beating 3-pointer by Shooting Guard Currye Todd on an inbound pass from former National Basketball Association player and 1992 US Dream Teamer Christian Laettner. Laettner joined the Giants for all 11 of their home games that season. The Giants played two home games at UNF Arena at the University of North Florida, and played the remaining nine at the Veterans Memorial Arena. The Giants won the 2012 ABA Championship, defeating the South Carolina Warriors 2–0 in a best-of-three series.

=== 2012–2013 ===
The Giants finished the season with a 29–1 regular season record and hosted the ABA Final Four tournament. The Giants won their second ABA Championship in a row, defeating the North Dallas Vandals, from whom they received their only loss of the regular season, 2–0 in a best-of-three series.

=== 2013–2014 ===
The Giants finished the season with a 29–1 record for the second straight season and advanced through the playoffs to the ABA National Championship game for the third straight season. The Giants fell to the Shreveport-Bossier Mavericks 2–0 in a best-of-three series. The first game was lost in overtime and the second was lost on a botched inbound attempt that sealed the game for the Mavericks. The 2013–2014 season saw a lot of positives for the Giants as they broke the ABA Regular Season Attendance record with 8,345 fans in attendance on February 2.

=== 2017–2018 ===
Finishing the season with a 19–1 record, the Giants advanced to the ABA Final Eight in Austin, TX, where they went 3-0 defeating the Steel City Yellow Jackets (125-103), the DMV Warriors (111-102) and the Austin Bats (119-114) to claim the 2018 ABA National Championship title. With this title the Jacksonville Giants complete the three-peat making this their third championship in a row and their fifth overall championship for the city of Jacksonville.

=== 2018–2019 ===
The Jacksonville Giants ended the regular season with a 20–1 record and headed to the ABA Final 8 in St. Louis, MO. The Giants managed a 129–98 win over the Steel City Yellow Jackets in the first round of playoffs to advance to the semifinals. In the semifinals the Giants took on the Syracuse Stallions and pulled off a 149–129 win which advanced them to the 2019 ABA National Championship game. In the championship the Giants got a rematch with the South Florida Gold, the only team to defeat Jacksonville in the regular season. In the regular season the Gold defeated the Giants with only a 5-point lead. In the title game the Jacksonville Giants were able to redeem themselves with a 116–112 win over the South Florida Gold to claim the 2019 title. The 2019 National Championship win was the 6th overall title for the Giants and their 4th in a row.

=== 2019–2020 ===
The 2019–2020 season marks the 10th Anniversary of the Jacksonville Giants conception.

=== 2021–2022 ===
Following elimination from the 2021–22 playoffs by the Steel City Yellow Jackets, the Giants ceased operations.

== Giants Dance Team ==
The Jacksonville Giants had the largest ABA dance team. Over 40 girls, ages 13 through 25, danced on two separate teams. The junior (or teenage) dance team was titled the Jacksonville Gems, while the adult dance team was called the Jacksonville Jewels.

== Television ==
All Jacksonville Giants home games played in the Jacksonville Veterans Memorial Arena were televised on WCWJ in high-definition. Broadcaster and sports talk radio host Richard Miller formerly hosted the Giants broadcasts starting during Season One in 2010. Arley Johnson and Matt Potak were later featured on the broadcast of the Jacksonville Giants home games.

== Radio ==
All Jacksonville Giants home games aired on WJXL 1010XL. Spencer Luthin (aka Spencer "Balls" Davis) hosted Giants radio since December 6, 2013.

== Records and recognition ==
February 7, 2014 – Most Points Scored in Basketball History – 222 points

February 5, 2012 – Most Points Scored in Basketball History – 211 points

February 1, 2014 – Highest Regular Season Attendance in ABA History – 8,354.

February 19, 2016 - Highest Regular Season Attendance in ABA History – 8,987.

June 1, 2014 – National ABA Charity Award for Outstanding Service to the Community.

2015-2015 Season – ABA Team of the Year, Ron Sholes ABA Owner of the Year, Pam Masters general Manager of the year, Kevin Waters coach of the year

2018-2019 Season – Maurice Mickens received ABA Player of the Year

== 2011–2012 roster ==
Jacksonville Giants Season Two 2011–2012 roster
Players

Pos.	No.	Player	Height	Weight	DOB	From
F/C	4	(United States)	Jermaine Bell	7 ft 0 in (2.13 m)	190 lb (86 kg)		Indian Hills CC
G	3	(United States)	Anthony Lumpkin	6 ft 0 in (1.83 m)	160 lb (73 kg)		Southwestern Oklahoma State
F	13	(United States)	Antonio Lawrence	6 ft 5 in (1.96 m)	200 lb (91 kg)		San José State
G	5	(United States)	Sherod Harris	5 ft 10 in (1.78 m)	160 lb (73 kg)		SUNY–Brockport
G	12	(United States)	Renaldo Norman	6 ft 4 in (1.93 m)	200 lb (91 kg)		Edward Waters
F	10	(United States)	Matt Fields	6 ft 7 in (2.01 m)	215 lb (98 kg)		Georgia Southern
	TBD	(United States)	A.J. Stewart		215 lb (98 kg)
G	TBD	(United States)	Anthony Jackson				Columbus State
	2	(United States)	Currye Todd				Lamar
F	9	(United States)	Lamar Sanders				Lamar
F	TBD	(United States)	Emanuel Jackson				Stephen F. Austin
	TBD	(United States)	Leon Smith
	33	(United States)	Sherard Reddick				Savannah State
F	32	(United States)	Tim Ware	6 ft 8 in (2.03 m)			Texas State
G	21	(United States)	Kevin McDonald				Savannah State

Coaches
Head coach
- (United States) Kevin Waters (Fisk)
Assistant(s)
- (United States) David Graham (Edward Waters)
- (United States) Jerry Williams (Cumberlands)
- (United States) Donte' Hill (Ferris State)

Legend
- (DP) Unsigned draft pick
- (FA) Free agent
- (S) Suspended
- Injured

Roster
Updated: 2010-12-1

== 2012–2013 roster ==
Jacksonville Giants Season Three 2012–2013 roster
Players

Pos.	No.	Player	Height	Weight	DOB	From
F/C	4	(United States)	Jermaine Bell	7 ft 0 in (2.13 m)	190 lb (86 kg)		Indian Hills CC
F	3	(United States)	Damone Brown	6 ft 9 in (2.06 m)	200 lb (91 kg)		Syracuse
C	13	(Republic of the Congo)	Josue Mulamba	6 ft 10 in (2.08 m)	220 lb (100 kg)		Imperial Valley
G	5	(United States)	Horton Ed	5 ft 10 in (1.78 m)	160 lb (73 kg)		Murray State
G	1	(United States)	Tony Hooper	5 ft 11 in (1.80 m)	200 lb (91 kg)		Louisiana–Monroe
F	10	(United States)	Matt Fields	6 ft 7 in (2.01 m)	215 lb (98 kg)		Georgia Southern
F	9	(United States)	Freeman Taylor	6 ft 6 in (1.98 m)	215 lb (98 kg)		Robert Morris
G	3	(United States)	Anthony Jackson	5 ft 11 in (1.80 m)			Columbus State
F	20	(United States)	Bernard Rimmer	6 ft 8 in (2.03 m)	200 lb (91 kg)		North Georgia
G	2	(United States)	Currye Todd	6 ft 4 in (1.93 m)	200 lb (91 kg)		Lamar
G	8	(United States)	Thomas Kevin	6 ft 2 in (1.88 m)			Murray State
F	21	(United States)	Jerrod Tucker	6 ft 4 in (1.93 m)	235 lb (107 kg)		Bellevue
F	33	(United States)	Eddie Brown	6 ft 9 in (2.06 m)			Campbell
G	33	(United States)	Brad Clark	6 ft 5 in (1.96 m)
C	32	(United States)	Gertavian Blake	6 ft 11 in (2.11 m)			Jackson State

Coaches
Head coach
- (United States) Kevin Waters (Fisk)
Assistant(s)
- (United States) David Graham (Edward Waters)
- (United States) Jerry Williams (Cumberlands)
- (United States) Anthony Lumpkin (Southwestern Oklahoma State)
- (United States) Donte' Hill (Ferris State)

Legend
- (DP) Unsigned draft pick
- (FA) Free agent
- (S) Suspended
- Injured

Roster
Updated: 2012-12-6

== 2013–2014 roster ==
Jacksonville Giants Season Three 2012–2013 roster
Players

Pos.	No.	Player	Height	Weight	DOB	From
F/C	4	(United States)	Jermaine Bell	7 ft 0 in (2.13 m)	190 lb (86 kg)		Indian Hills CC
F	3	(United States)	Damone Brown	6 ft 9 in (2.06 m)	200 lb (91 kg)		Syracuse
C	13	(Republic of the Congo)	Josue Mulamba	6 ft 10 in (2.08 m)	220 lb (100 kg)		Imperial Valley
G	5	(United States)	Horton Ed	5 ft 10 in (1.78 m)	160 lb (73 kg)		Murray State
G	1	(United States)	Tony Hooper	5 ft 11 in (1.80 m)	200 lb (91 kg)		Louisiana–Monroe
F	10	(United States)	Matt Fields	6 ft 7 in (2.01 m)	215 lb (98 kg)		Georgia Southern
F	9	(United States)	Freeman Taylor	6 ft 6 in (1.98 m)	215 lb (98 kg)		Robert Morris
G	3	(United States)	Anthony Jackson	5 ft 11 in (1.80 m)			Columbus State
F	20	(United States)	Bernard Rimmer	6 ft 8 in (2.03 m)	200 lb (91 kg)		North Georgia
G	2	(United States)	Currye Todd	6 ft 4 in (1.93 m)	200 lb (91 kg)		Lamar
G	8	(United States)	Thomas Kevin	6 ft 2 in (1.88 m)			Murray State
F	21	(United States)	Jerrod Tucker	6 ft 4 in (1.93 m)	235 lb (107 kg)		Bellevue
F	33	(United States)	Eddie Brown	6 ft 9 in (2.06 m)			Campbell
G	33	(United States)	Brad Clark	6 ft 5 in (1.96 m)
C	32	(United States)	Gertavian Blake	6 ft 11 in (2.11 m)			Jackson State

Coaches
Head coach
- (United States) Kevin Waters (Fisk)
Assistant(s)
- (United States) David Graham (Edward Waters)
- (United States) Anthony Lumpkin (Southwestern Oklahoma State)

Legend
- (DP) Unsigned draft pick
- (FA) Free agent
- (S) Suspended
- Injured

Roster
Updated: 2012-12-6

== 2018–2019 roster ==
Jacksonville Giants Season Nine 2018-2019 Roster roster
Players

Pos.	No.	Player	Height	Weight	DOB	From
F/C	4	(United States)	Jermaine Bell	7 ft 0 in (2.13 m)	190 lb (86 kg)		Indian Hills CC
G	11	(United States)	Aaron Bowen	6 ft 6 in (1.98 m)	190 lb (86 kg)		Georgetown
F/C	44	(United States)	Chris Brown	7 ft 0 in (2.13 m)	250 lb (113 kg)
G	24	(United States)	Dylon Cormier	6 ft 2 in (1.88 m)	160 lb (73 kg)		Loyola (MD)
G	8	(United States)	Jeremiah Hill	6 ft 3 in (1.91 m)	170 lb (77 kg)		Valdosta State
G	1	(United States)	Maurice Mickens	6 ft 0 in (1.83 m)	175 lb (79 kg)
G	12	(United States)	Bernard Nugent	6 ft 0 in (1.83 m)	190 lb (86 kg)
G	10	(United States)	Miguel Paul	6 ft 2 in (1.88 m)	178 lb (81 kg)		East Carolina
F	21	(United States)	Jerrod Tucker	6 ft 6 in (1.98 m)	220 lb (100 kg)
F	13	(United States)	Juandrico Walker	6 ft 8 in (2.03 m)	198 lb (90 kg)
F	40	(United States)	Rodney Rodney	6 ft 8 in (2.03 m)	195 lb (88 kg)
F	33	(United States)	Calvin Warner	6 ft 8 in (2.03 m)	235 lb (107 kg)
G	2	(United States)	Brenton Williams	6 ft 0 in (1.83 m)	170 lb (77 kg)		South Carolina
G	7	(United States)	RJ Wright	6 ft 3 in (1.91 m)	175 lb (79 kg)

Coaches
Head coach
- (United States) Jerry Williams
Assistant(s)
- (United States) Marcus Thomas

Legend
- (DP) Unsigned draft pick
- (FA) Free agent
- (S) Suspended
- Injured

Roster
