= Kentucky Bisons =

- Founded: 2008; 18 years ago
- Folded: 2010; 16 years ago
- League: ABA
- Team history: Kentucky Mavericks (2008); Kentucky Bisons (2008-2010)
- Based in: Bowling Green, Kentucky
- Arena: Owensboro Sportscenter
- Colors: blue, black, white, red
- Owner: Jim Sills
- Head coach: Vacant
- Championships: 1 (2009)
- Mascot: Billy Bison

The Kentucky Bisons were a basketball team in the American Basketball Association which began play in 2008–09, play in the South Central division. Although the management office for the Bisons was based in Bowling Green, Kentucky, the Bisons actually played their home games at the Owensboro Sportscenter, 60 miles north of Bowling Green. On December 14, 2010, the Bisons stated they would be suspending operations due to lack of support from the city of Owensboro, KY.

== Team history ==
=== 2008 ===
With a 19–3 regular-season record, they qualified for the ABA's Elite Eight Championship tournament at the Nashville Municipal Auditorium (home to Southeast division rival the Nashville Broncs). After defeating Beijing Aoshen Olympian 106–104 in the first round, the Bisons would pull off an upset win over the top-seeded Southeast Texas Mustangs 107–89 to advance to the ABA title game. Finally, with their 127–120 win over the Maywood Buzz, the Bisons wrapped up the ABA title in their first year of existence.

=== 2009 ===
In 2009, they returned to the title series again, and faced top-seeded Southeast Texas. After winning game one, they lost both games two and three and the Mavericks were crowned champions.

=== 2010 ===
Shortly before the 2010 season both the head coach and assistant coach resigned their positions. On December 14, 2010, the Bisons announced that they would be suspending operations. The reason stated was the lack of support from the City of Owensboro and their businesses and fans.

== Roster ==
Head Coach: Otis Key

| # | | Pos. | Ht. | Player | Acquired | College |
| 1 | (United States) | PG | 5'9 | Brandon Stockton | 2008 | Kentucky |
| 10 | (United States) | SG | 6'2 | Darryl Washington | 2008 |
| 15 | (United States) | PG | 6'3 | Michael Wells | 2008 | Western Kentucky |
| 32 | (United States) | SF/PF | 6'5 | Jamie Jackson | 2008 | Bellarmine |
| 2 | (United States) | SF | 6'5 | LaMar Owen | 2008 | Southern Illinois |
| 3 | (United States) | PG | 5'9 | Michael James | 2008 | Florida International |
| 9 | (United States) | SG | 6'4 | Michael Morris | 2010 | Austin Peay |
| 30 | (United States) | SG | 6'2 | Teco Dickerson | 2008 | Western Kentucky |
