= North Texas Fresh =

American basketball team in Fort Worth, Texas

- Founded: 2009
- League: UBA
- Team history: North Texas Fresh (2009-13); Fort Worth Fresh (2013-15); North Texas Fresh (2015-present)
- Based in: Fort Worth, Texas
- Arena: Crowley Middle School
- Colors: black, gold, white, grey
- Owner: Jay Bowdy
- Head coach: Brandon Wilson
- Championships: 0
- Mascot: G - Fresh

The North Texas Fresh is a semi-professional basketball team based in Fort Worth, Texas. The Fresh are a member of the Universal Basketball Association.

== History ==
The franchise is owned by Jay Bowdy, who was a high school and college player from the Fort Worth area. After two seasons at Southwestern Christian College (2006 NJCAA All-American Honorable Mention) Bowdy transferred to the University of West Georgia, an NCAA Division II program.

The Fresh play their home games in Fort Worth, Texas, at Crowley Middle School. The team schedules games against both UBA and non-UBA (independent) opponents.

Established in 2009, the Fresh began play in the American Basketball Association 2009–10 season. After three seasons in the ABA the Fresh moved to the UBA in 2012.

== Season-by-season ==
Season	W	L	Result	Playoffs
2009-10	10	4	2nd of 7 ABA Southwest	DNQ
2010-11	1	5	5th of 5 ABA Southwest	DNQ
2011-12	1	7	7th of 7 ABA Southwest	DNQ
2012-13	14	8	3rd of 5 UBA Western	Eliminated in quarterfinals by Georgia Spartans
2013-14	13	7	3rd of 6 UBA Western	Eliminated in quarterfinals by Georgia PRIME
2014-15	9	11	4th of 6 UBA Western	DNQ
