= Texas Fuel =

American basketball team

- Founded: 2008
- League: ABA
- Team history: South Texas Showboats (2008); Texas Fuel (2008–present)
- Based in: San Antonio, Texas
- Arena: Alamo Convocation Center and Mission Concepcion Sports Park
- Colors: green, lime green, black
- Owner: Aurora Deiri, Marlon Minifee, Marisol Valdez, Juan Valdez, Jesse Pena, Eleanor Duke
- Head coach: Johnny Tyson
- Championships: 0
- Cheerleaders: Lady Heat Rays and the Caliente Crew
- Dancers: The Texas FUEL Dancers
- Mascot: Big E. World

The Texas Fuel, formerly the South Texas Showboats, were a basketball team in the American Basketball Association. Based in San Antonio, the Fuel played their home games at the Alamo Convocation Center.

During the original planning process, the Showboats were a member of the United Basketball League.

Due to the team coming under new ownership, in 2008, the name was changed to the Texas Fuel, to honor the Fuel film that inspired the team to go green, and the colors changed to green and black. The team colors signify traditional Texas oil ( black) and new alternative fuels (green), such as biofuel. The team represents changes in fuel technology. In 2010, a biofueled bus was given to the team by Farouk USA and Biosilk.

On August 29, 2011, it was announced that the Indiana Pacers guard George Hill had signed a contract to play for the Fuel until the NBA lockout ended. His activities included practicing with the team and playing in two exhibition games in Brownsville and San Antonio. He also attended anti- bullying rallies with the team at Texas schools. The team was given the key to the city of San Benito for their anti-bullying efforts.

The Texas Fuel continues to earn accolades with one or two ABA All-Stars selected from the team every year since its inception, and the first Sportsman of the Year award from the Southwest Conference for Jason McNeil, due to his community charity work with the team for three consecutive years.
