= Violet Lopez Watson =

Jamaican-American clubwoman (1891–1971)

- Violet Lopez Watson, from a 1971 magazine
- Born: Violet Mae Lopez; September 5, 1891; Manchester Parish, Jamaica
- Died: October 25, 1971 (aged 80); Washington, D.C.
- Notable work: co-founder, National Council of Negro Women
- Spouse: James S. Watson
- Children: James Lopez Watson, Barbara M. Watson, Grace Watson, Douglas Watson
- Relatives: Colin Powell (nephew)

Violet Mae Lopez Watson (September 5, 1891 – October 25, 1971) was a Jamaican-born American clubwoman and community leader. She was a co-founder with Mary McLeod Bethune of the National Council of Negro Women.

== Early life ==
Violet Lopez was born in Manchester, Jamaica, the daughter of Israel Lopez and Matilda Johnson d'Aguilar.

== Career ==
Watson was a prominent judge's wife and social hostess in Harlem, welcoming a diverse array of international leaders and cultural figures to the Watson home, including Langston Hughes, Alain Locke, Countee Cullen, Kwame Nkrumah and Niels Bohr. "People talk of black history," recalled her daughter Barbara, "we lived it." In 1934 she was in the cast of a production of Una Marson's At What a Price? by the Lenox Players.

The National Council of Negro Women (NCNW) was founded by Mary McLeod Bethune and others, in Watson's home. Watson also served on advisory boards for the New York Port Authority, the YWCA, the NAACP, and the National Union League. During World War II, she was active with civil defense programs in Harlem. In 1971, the year she died, she attended an NCNW awards event hosted by the ambassador from Ghana, Ebenezer Moses Debrah, with honorees including her daughter Barbara M. Watson, Shirley Chisholm, Elizabeth Duncan Koontz, and Bennetta Bullock Washington.

== Personal life ==
Violet Lopez married judge James S. Watson in 1917. They had four children, including ambassador Barbara M. Watson (1918–1983), aeronautical engineer Douglas Courtenay Watson (1920–1993), judge James Lopez Watson (1922–2001) and educator Grace E. Watson (1924–2015). Watson was widowed in 1952, and she died in October 1971 at her daughter's home in Washington, D.C., aged 80 years. A memorial service was held at the Washington National Cathedral. Some of her papers are in the James S. Watson Papers, in the Schomburg Center for Research in Black Culture at the New York Public Library.
