= Walentynowicz =

Walentynowicz is a Polish surname. Notable people with the surname include:

- Anna Walentynowicz (1929–2010), Polish anti-communist activist
- Leonard F. Walentynowicz (1932–2005), American diplomat
- Marian Walentynowicz (1896–1967), Polish graphic artist
