= Bureau of Consular Affairs =

U.S. State Department division

Bureau overview
- Jurisdiction: Executive branch of the United States
- Headquarters: 600 19th Street NW, Washington, D.C., United States
- Annual budget: $3.48 billion (FY 2017)
- Bureau executive: Mora Namdar, Assistant Secretary of State for Consular Affairs
- Parent department: U.S. State Department
- Website: Official web

The Bureau of Consular Affairs (CA) is a bureau of the United States Department of State reporting to the under secretary of state for management. The bureau's mission is to administer laws, formulate regulations, and implement policies relating to the broad range of consular services and immigration.

== History ==
The precursor to the Bureau of Consular Affairs, the Bureau of Security and Consular Affairs was created in 1952 upon passage of the Immigration and Nationality Act. The bureau was charged with issuing visas and passports, and extending visas for non-immigrants in the United States. For a period of time in 1954, the bureau was known as the Bureau of Inspection, Security, and Consular Affairs. In 1979, the security functions were moved to an Office of Security—which later became the Bureau of Diplomatic Security—and the Bureau of Consular Affairs was formed. The bureau was heavily impacted by mass layoffs during the second Trump administration, with 102 personnel, including the entire rapid-response consular officer team, laid off in July 2025.

== Offices ==
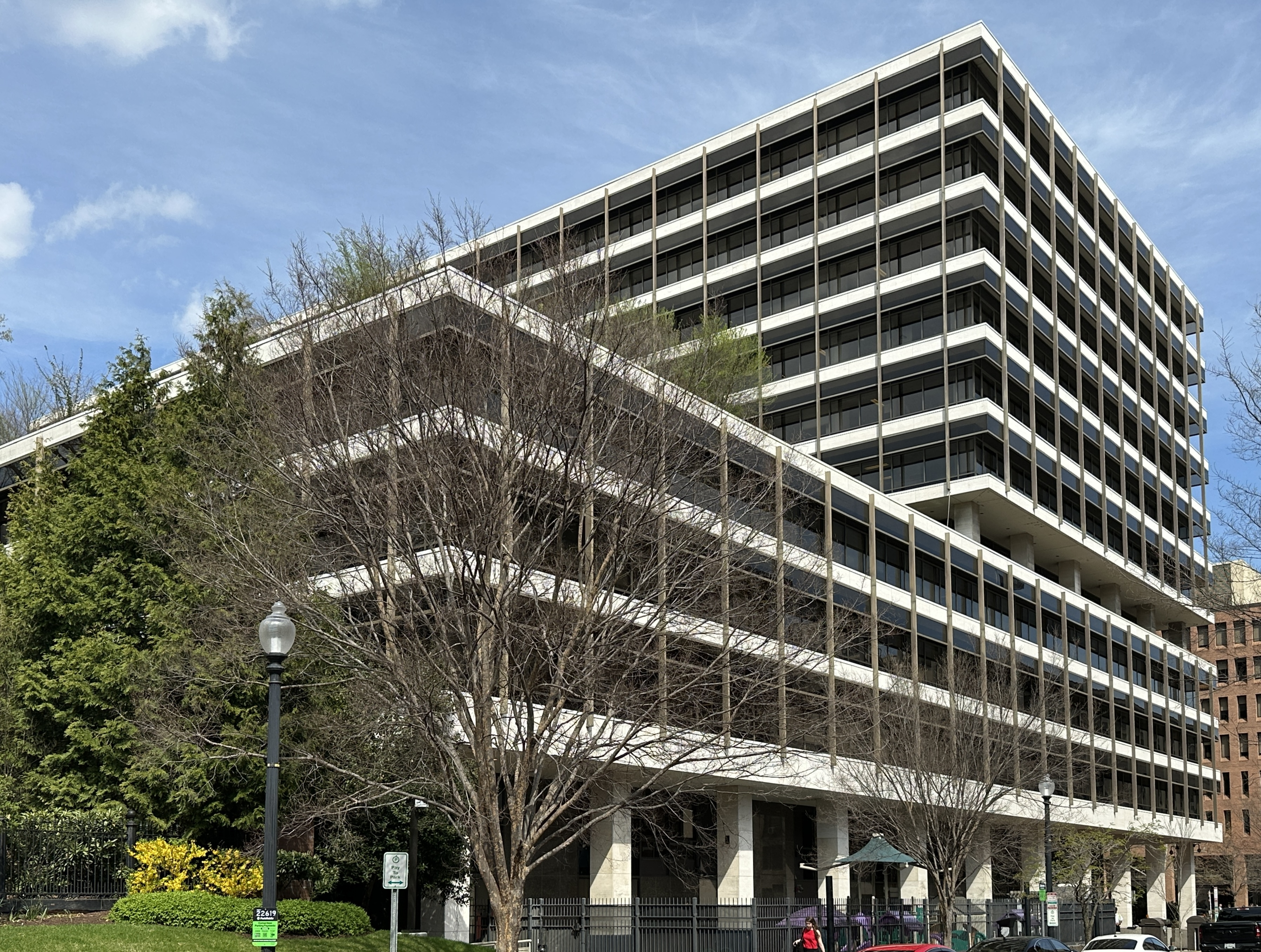
Bureau of Consular Affairs offices in Washington, D.C.

The Bureau of Consular Affairs manages eight offices: the Offices of the Comptroller, Consular Systems and Technology, Executive Director, Fraud Prevention, Overseas Citizen Services, Policy Coordination and Public Affairs, Passport Services, and Visa Services.

=== Office of Comptroller ===
The principal strategic and resource management office for the Bureau of Consular Affairs.

=== Office of Consular Systems and Technology ===
Develops, installs, and provides training for the bureau's automated information processing systems.

=== Office of Executive Director ===
Provides a full range of management support for the bureau, including management of the bureau's IT systems and infrastructure, human resources, and controlled consular supplies.

=== Office of Fraud Prevention ===
Dedicated to providing resources, tools, and information that enhances consular officers' ability to detect and deter passport and visa fraud.

=== Office of Overseas Citizen Services ===
Advises and supports U.S. citizens and U.S. embassies and consulates around the world in such matters as:

- Deaths
- Arrests
- Robberies
- Citizenship and nationality (including both acquisition of citizenship through naturalization and the Child Citizenship Act of 2000 and renunciation of citizenship)
- Federal benefits (including Social Security)
- Notarization of documents
- International child abduction
- International adoptions

To assist the traveling public, the bureau issues country specific information, travel warnings, and travel alerts concerning conditions in countries where Americans may be planning to visit or reside. The bureau also maintains the volunteer Warden Program, designed to help protect and inform US citizens in host nations.

=== Office of Policy Coordination and Public Affairs ===
Articulates the bureau's policy through media relations, public outreach, congressional liaison, and strategic planning.

=== Office of Passport Services ===
Issues passports to American citizens. Over 119 million valid U.S. passports are currently in circulation. 13.5 million passports and passport cards were issued in fiscal year 2013.

Since June 1, 2009, all American travelers entering the United States, including at land borders or air/sea ports of entry, are required to show proof of citizenship, which can include a passport book or passport card.

The deputy assistant secretary of state for passport services is Matthew Pierce, a long-time public servant.

Passports may be issued domestically as well as by US embassies or consulates abroad. In 2006, the bureau began the widespread issuance of electronic passports or "e-passports."

=== Visas Services Office ===
Following regulations established by Congress in the Immigration and Nationality Act (INA), consular officers overseas under the guidance of the bureau's Office of Visa Services are responsible for issuing all non-immigrant and immigrant visas. (Over 7.75 million non-immigrant visa and approximately 744,000 immigrant visa cases were processed in fiscal year 2006.)

The Bureau of Consular Affairs also administers the provisions of the INA as they relate to the Department of State in coordination with United States Citizenship and Immigration Services and U.S. Immigration and Customs Enforcement within the United States Department of Homeland Security.

== International child abduction and adoption ==
The Office of Children's Issues creates, develops and coordinates policies and programs on international child abduction and international adoption issues. In this respect, it is the US Central Authority under the terms of the Hague Abduction Convention and the Hague Adoption Convention.
