= Mary Burke Washington =

American economist (1926–2014)

Mary Cornelia Burke Washington
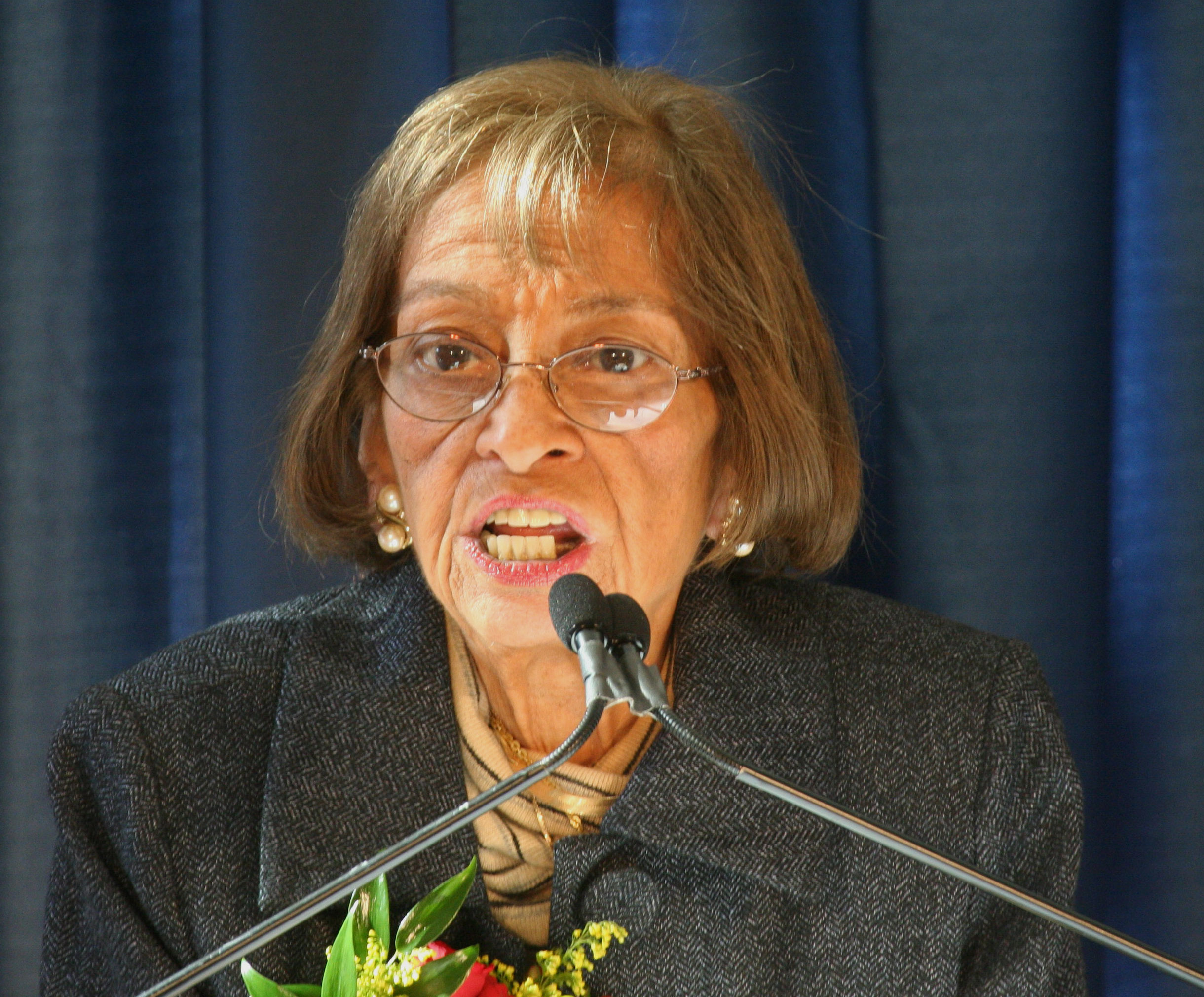
- Washington in 2007
- Born: Mary Burke Nicholas; July 6, 1926; Tuskegee, Alabama
- Died: November 30, 2014 (aged 88); Arlington, Virginia
- Education: University of Wisconsin
- Occupation: Economist
- Known for: State cabinet secretary of New York
- Spouse: Walter Washington
- Children: Tracy Bledsoe, Scott Nicholas

Mary Cornelia Burke Washington (formerly Mary Burke Nicholas; July 6, 1926 – November 30, 2014) was an American economist, former New York state official, and advocate for women and other marginalized groups in public life. She held a variety of positions in federal, state, and city government in New York throughout the 1970s and 1980s.

== Early life and education ==
She was born Mary Cornelia Burke on July 6, 1926, in Tuskegee, Alabama, to Ruth Freeland and Walter Sturgeon Burke. Both her parents were graduates of Howard University. Her father, Walter Burke, who also had a law degree from Howard University School of Law, had moved the family from Washington D.C. to Tuskegee during the 1920s to help establish Tuskegee Home, one of the United States' first Veterans Administration hospitals for African-American military veterans. The family moved back to Washington D.C. when she was about 10 years old. She graduated from Dunbar High School in Washington, D.C. in 1944. Burke then received her bachelor's degree in economics from the University of Wisconsin in 1948.

== Career ==
She was appointed the first director of New York State Women's Division by Governor Hugh Carey in 1975.

== Personal life ==
Washington was known as Mary Burke Nicholas prior to her 1994 marriage to Walter Washington, a widower who had previously held office as the first elected Mayor of the District of Columbia from 1967 to 1979.
