= Grant Stockdale =

American politician

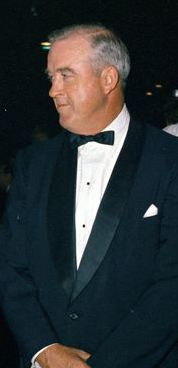
- Stockdale in October 1963

United States Ambassador to Ireland
- In office May 17, 1961 – July 7, 1962
- President: John F. Kennedy
- Preceded by: R. W. Scott McLeod
- Succeeded by: Matthew H. McCloskey

Personal details
- Born: July 31, 1915 Greenville, Mississippi, U.S.
- Died: December 2, 1963 (aged 48) Miami, Florida, U.S.
- Party: Democratic
- Spouse: Alice Boyd Magruder
- Children: 5
- Education: University of Miami

Military service
- Allegiance: United States
- Branch/service: United States Marine Corps
- Battles/wars: World War II

Edward Grant Stockdale (July 31, 1915 – December 2, 1963), was a Florida businessman and friend of President John F. Kennedy who served as United States Ambassador to Ireland from 1961 to 1962.

== Early years ==
Born Edward Grant Stockdale in 1915, he was an Episcopalian from Greenville, Mississippi, where one of his childhood friends was the writer, Shelby Foote. He attended the University of Miami, was voted President of his freshman class, was reelected President of his sophomore class, served as president, Phi Alpha fraternity, and was the first University of Miami graduate to become a United States Ambassador. He played varsity football in 1938 and 1939, and graduated with a degree in Business Administration. He worked as a salesman and then as a manager for a venetian blind company. He then worked in real estate and was elected President of the Miami Junior Chamber of Commerce. During World War II he served in the U.S. Marine Corps in the Pacific. He left the service as a 1st Lieutenant and remained a Major in the U.S. Marine Corps Reserves.

== Career ==
Stockdale was a Democrat and friend of George Smathers, whom he helped elect to Congress in 1946. Stockdale became Smathers' administrative assistant briefly and served in the Florida Legislature from 1948 to 1949. Through Smathers, Stockdale met John F. Kennedy, like Smathers, a newly elected Congressman, in 1947. Smathers would later be elected US Senator from Florida, and in his Oral Senatorial History, said:

Stockdale fell in love with Jack Kennedy and Jack Kennedy loved him. Later Jack Kennedy made him ambassador to Ireland, when Jack got to be president. Ted Reardon was Jack's administrative assistant, and Ted and my guy Stockdale became intimate friends, and Jack and I became very close friends. Because Jack, as you can see from that picture, only weighed about a hundred and twenty-five pounds. Of the fellows least likely to be president, you'd have to vote Jack number one. He only weighed about a hundred and twenty-five pounds, and he had this bad back, and he had another illness that we didn't know about at the time, but he didn't look well. He was not well, he was in pain most of the time. When they'd ring the bells for us to go over to have a vote or have a quorum call, this poor guy would have a hard time getting over there. So the way it would happen is I'd go by and holler, 'C'mon Jack, let's go.' He would lean on me, or Stockdale, or Ted Reardon, and we'd all kind of march over to the floor of the House of Representatives where he would cast his vote, or vote present, or whatever was the order of the day.

While serving in the Florida House of Representatives, he introduced the Women's Jury Bill to provide for jury service by women, reluctantly accepted an amendment that instead allowed women to register for jury service, and secured the bill's passage by persuading the governor to withdraw his veto of the legislation. He also introduced the first anti-Ku Klux Klan legislation in a southern state, designed to prohibit the wearing of masks and hoods in public. He reported receiving anonymous telephone calls telling him "leave this thing alone or you'll be sorry." He rejected support for the bill offered by the Communist-dominated Miami Civil Rights Congress. He also secured House passage of a Birth Secrecy Bill that made the birth certificates of illegitimate children confidential. He also led a successful campaign against a tax on hotels and rooming houses and supported legislation to increase criminal penalties for child molestation. He lost the Democratic primary for his House seat in May 1950 to Dante Fascell.

Stockdale served on the Dade County Commission from 1952 to 1956. He staged a one-man revolt in September 1954 by making an issue of the commission's practice of conducting closed-door meetings and requiring unanimous votes. In 1955 he proposed the development of a convention hall to bring national conventions and sporting events to Miami and Miami Beach and a variety of other projects.

Stockdale later worked in real estate in Miami. President Kennedy visited him in Florida frequently before becoming president. In 1959 and 1960 Stockdale headed the Florida State committee to elect John F. Kennedy president. When Smathers decided to go to the 1960 Democratic National Convention as the favorite son candidate of the Florida delegation, part of an effort aimed at securing the nomination for Kennedy, he urged Stockdale to join the delegation: "[I]t would appear to me that the best way you can be helpful to Jack Kennedy is to come on out with us ... where the fight will be held. You can't do him any good at home ... you must be where your voice can be heard and your presence felt." Stockdale campaigned for him in West Virginia, Oregon, and New York, and he was a member of the Democratic Party National Finance Committee.

=== Ambassador to Ireland ===
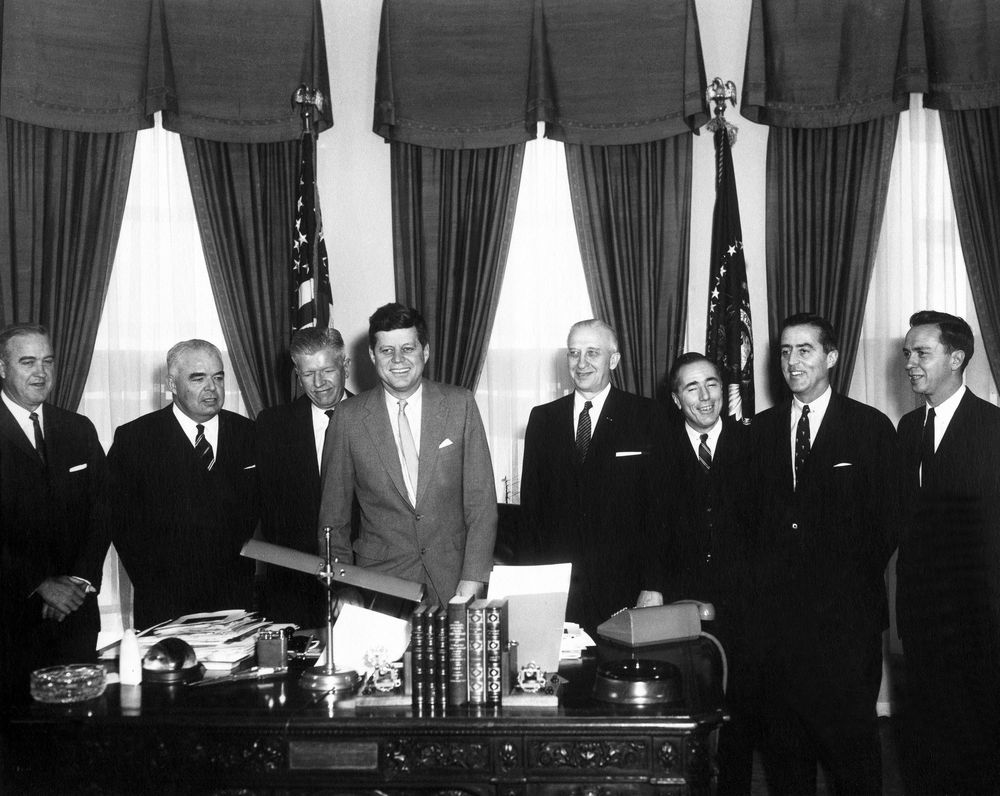
Stockdale (far left) with Kennedy and other ambassadors in March 1961

At the start of the Kennedy administration, Newsweek magazine described Stockdale as "an ardent New Frontiersman and sometime participant in Kennedy touch-football games". Kennedy nominated Stockdale to serve as Ambassador to Ireland in February 1961. Time magazine criticized Kennedy for nominating Stockdale after promising during the campaign to appoint ambassadors on the basis of ability alone. It asked "where reward stopped and ability began". The Senate confirmed the appointment on March 28, 1961.

In April, 1961, just before leaving for Ireland, Stockdale was sued by a business rival that claimed he had used "undue influence" to win government contracts for a Miami vending machines company in which he held stock. The Dade County Circuit Court dismissed that suit as "frivolous" and the Florida Circuit Court of Appeals upheld that dismissal. Congress later investigated those vending machine companies as part of the Bobby Baker scandal investigations into bribery of members of Congress, though Stockdale was not a target of the investigation. When interviewed by the Miami Herald during the Baker investigation, Stockdale said: "I am a business man, but I still consider myself a quasi-public figure. I am very meticulous in my dealings."

Stockdale presented his credentials in Dublin on May 17, 1961, and served until July 7, 1962.

=== The "Stockdale Watch" ===
Before Kennedy was elected President, Stockdale gifted him a watch, made by the Omega Company, which on the back Stockdale had engraved: "To John F. Kennedy President of the United States From His Friend Grant." Kennedy wore the watch on his first day in office, and was wearing it when he was assassinated on November 22, 1963. The watch was purchased at auction by Omega which displays it in its museum in Switzerland. President Kennedy ended a letter to then-Ambassador Stockdale, on April 4, 1962, "I thought you might like to know I am wearing the Stockdale watch"; after which typewritten statement, Kennedy handwrites in, "again."

=== Return to private life ===
After his time as ambassador, Stockdale returned to real estate and worked in public relations for the American Canteen Company. He also maintained his friendship with Kennedy. On January 1, 1963, Stockdale sat with Kennedy to watch the Orange Bowl game between the Alabama Crimson Tide and the Oklahoma Sooners, for which the President performed the opening coin toss. Stockdale was invited by Kennedy to participate in the May 30, 1963, Memorial Day ceremonies at Arlington National Cemetery, as the President laid a wreath at the Tomb of the Unknown Soldier. Following the ceremonies, Kennedy and Stockdale visited the grave of Lieutenant James Forrestal, first United States Secretary of Defense and former Secretary of the Navy.

On November 23, 1963, Stockdale received a telegram from Robert F. Kennedy at 12:59 a.m. stating: "THE PRESIDENT'S BODY WILL LIE IN REPOSE IN THE EAST ROOM OF THE WHITE HOUSE SATURDAY. YOU ARE INVITED TO JOIN IN PAYING HIM RESPECTS FROM 2:30 TO 5:00 P.M. [SIGNED] ROBERT F KENNEDY." Stockdale flew to Washington to pay his respects, flew back to Miami, then returned to Washington for President Kennedy's funeral on November 25.

== Personal life and death ==
In 1954, Stockdale was named a member of Iron Arrow, an honorary organization of University of Miami graduates. He also served terms as president of the University of Miami Alumni Association and the Miami Jaycees.

He was married to the poet Alice Boyd Stockdale, née Magruder. He had 2 sons and 3 daughters.

Stockdale died in a fall from his office on the 13th floor of the DuPont Building in Miami, Florida, on December 2, 1963, one week after the funeral and just ten days after the assassination of President Kennedy. Police termed it a suicide, but no suicide note was found. Larry King later reported speaking to him the day of the assassination and finding him "disconsolate to the point where he couldn't get a word out". Asked on the day of the assassination, by the Miami Herald, for a quote, Stockdale provided:

John F. Kennedy, our great President, is dead. Our magnificent American is gone. No man loved humanity more nor served it better. He loved Miami and its people. Florida was his second home. This is the saddest day in my life.

Alice Boyd Stockdale's book of poetry, To Ireland, with Love, was published by Doubleday & Company in 1964 and dedicated to her husband: "For Grant with whom, hand in hand, I walked through Phoenix Park ... and who will always walk with me." President Kennedy had urged her to publish her poems. Stockdale's son, Lee Lawson, also a poet, won the 2022 United Kingdom National Poetry Prize for his poem, "My Dead Father's General Store in the Middle of a Desert" which discusses Stockdale's suicide.

Diplomatic posts
| Preceded by R. W. Scott McLeod | United States Ambassador to Ireland; May 17, 1961 – July 7, 1962 | Succeeded by Matthew H. McCloskey |
