= William Howard Taft III =

American politician (1915–1991)

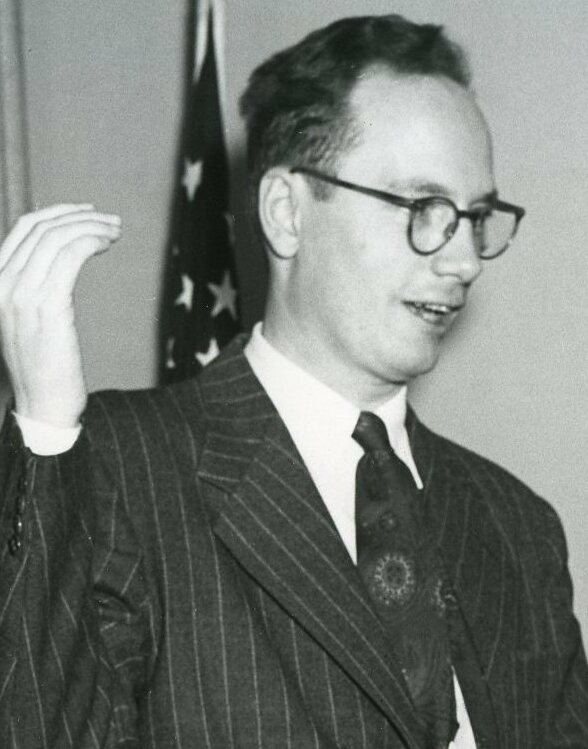
- Taft being sworn in as Ambassador to Ireland, 1953

United States Ambassador to Ireland
- In office May 13, 1953 – June 25, 1957
- President: Dwight D. Eisenhower
- Preceded by: Francis P. Matthews
- Succeeded by: Scott McLeod

Personal details
- Born: August 7, 1915 Bar Harbor, Maine, U.S.
- Died: February 23, 1991 (aged 75) Washington, D.C., U.S.
- Party: Republican
- Spouse: Barbara Bradfield
- Relations: William Howard Taft (grandfather)
- Children: 4, including William Howard Taft IV
- Parent(s): Robert A. Taft; Martha Wheaton Bowers Taft
- Education: Yale University (BA); Princeton University (PhD)
- Profession: Diplomat and professor

William Howard Taft III (August 7, 1915 – February 23, 1991) was an American diplomat who served as United States Ambassador to Ireland from 1953 to 1957, and was a grandson of President William Howard Taft and First Lady Helen Louise "Nellie" Taft.

== Early life ==
William Howard Taft III was born on August 7, 1915, and was the eldest of four sons born to Robert A. Taft (1889–1953) and Martha Wheaton Bowers (1889–1958), daughter of Lloyd Wheaton Bowers (1859–1910), the former solicitor general of the United States from 1909 to 1910. His three brothers were: Robert Taft Jr. (1917–1993), who was elected to the U.S. Senate; Lloyd Bowers Taft (1923–1985), who worked as an investment banker in Cincinnati, and Horace Dwight Taft (1925–1983), who became a professor of physics and dean at Yale. At the time of his birth, his grandfather had just ended his presidency and had recently become the Kent Professor of Law and Legal History at Yale Law School. Taft graduated from Yale University and earned a doctorate from Princeton University.

== Career ==
After graduating from Princeton, Taft taught English at the University of Maryland and Haverford College. During World War II, Taft became an analyst in military intelligence. After the war ended, he went back to Yale and taught there.

In 1949, he went to Dublin as part of the Marshall Plan aid mission and worked for the Central Intelligence Agency and the Defense Department from 1951 to 1953.

=== Ambassador to Ireland ===
In 1953, President Eisenhower appointed Taft U.S. ambassador to Ireland. His task as ambassador was made easier by the fact that John A. Costello (Taoiseach, 1954–57) was a personal friend; Taft described Costello as "pleasant and unassuming" whereas he had found Éamon de Valera "formal and aloof". (His predecessor, George A. Garrett, had also found Costello more sympathetic than de Valera.) Taft played a considerable part in organizing Costello's successful state visit to the United States in March 1956.

In 1957, Eisenhower appointed R. W. Scott McLeod as his successor to the Ambassadorship and Taft returned to the State Department as a member of its policy planning staff. He remained with State until 1960, when he became Consul General in Mozambique. He retired from the State Department's bureau for scientific, environmental and space affairs in 1977.

== Personal life ==
Taft married Barbara Bradfield, with whom he had four children:

- John Thomas Taft
- William Howard Taft IV (b. 1945), who married Julia Vadala (1942–2008)
- Maria Herron Taft, who married John Clemow, son of Albert George Clemow, in 1971.
- Martha Bowers Taft, who married Michael Golden, son of the British Michael Golden, in 1971.

Taft was a member of the Metropolitan Club of Washington, D.C. He died of prostate cancer at his Washington home on February 23, 1991.

== See also ==
- Taft family

Diplomatic posts
Preceded by Francis P. Matthews	United States Ambassador to Ireland; 1953–1957	Succeeded by R. W. Scott McLeod
