= Steven Means =

American football player (born 1990)

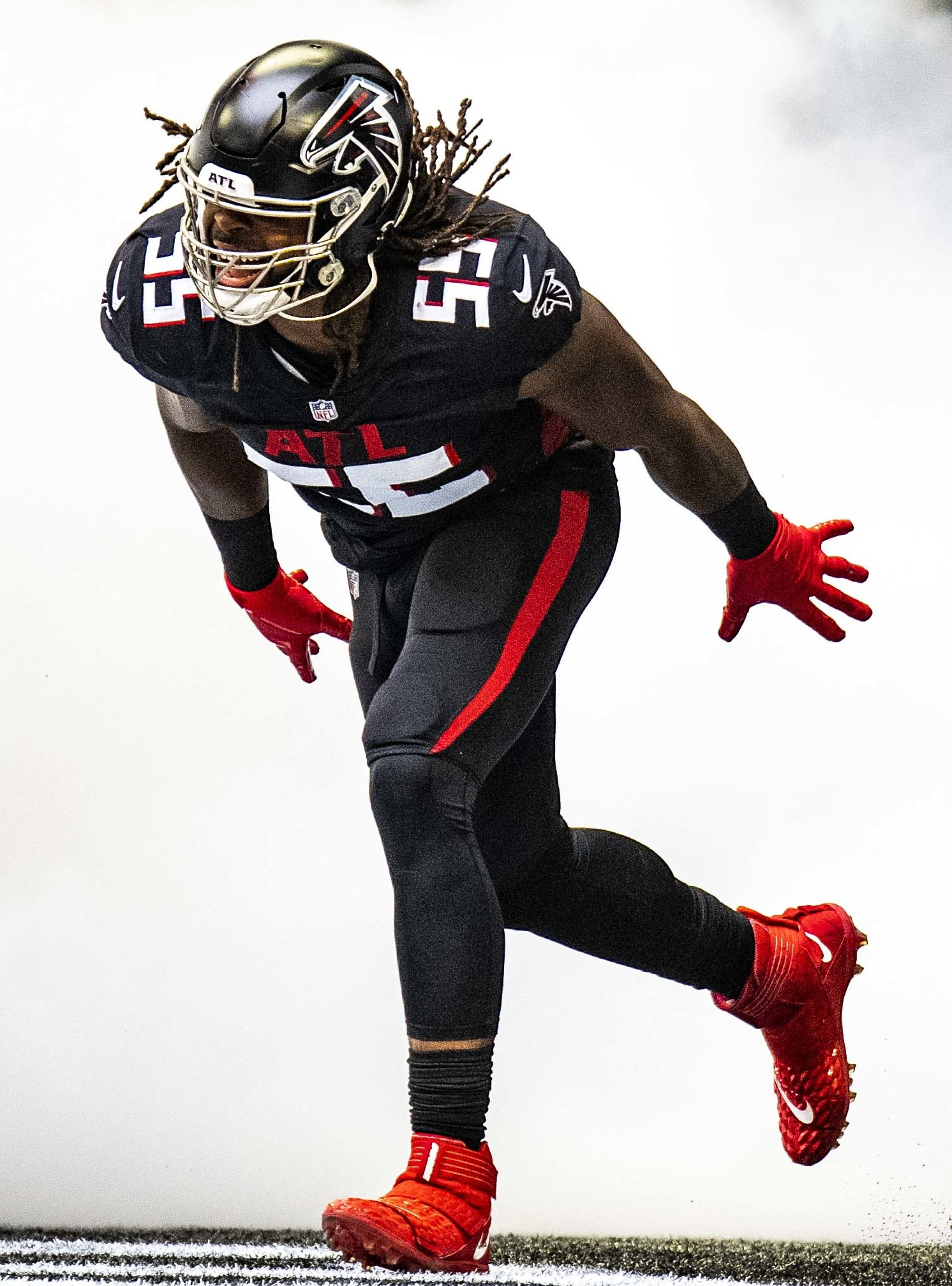
- Means with the Atlanta Falcons in 2021

No. 96, 51, 56, 55, 60
- Position: Linebacker

Personal information
- Born: September 16, 1990 (age 36); Buffalo, New York, U.S.
- Listed height: 6 ft 3 in (1.91 m)
- Listed weight: 263 lb (119 kg)

Career information
- High school: Grover Cleveland (Buffalo)
- College: Buffalo
- NFL draft: 2013: 5th round, 147th overall pick

Career history
- Tampa Bay Buccaneers (2013−2014); Baltimore Ravens (2014−2015); Houston Texans (2015)*; Philadelphia Eagles (2015–2017); Atlanta Falcons (2018–2021); Baltimore Ravens (2022)
- * Offseason or practice squad member only

Awards and highlights
- Super Bowl champion (LII); Second-team All-MAC (2012)

Career NFL statistics
- Total tackles: 108
- Sacks: 6
- Forced fumbles: 3
- Fumble recoveries: 1
- Stats at Pro Football Reference

Steven Means (born September 16, 1990) is an American former professional football player who was a linebacker in the National Football League (NFL). He was selected by the Tampa Bay Buccaneers in the fifth round of the 2013 NFL draft. He played college football for the Buffalo Bulls.

Means was also a member of the Baltimore Ravens, Houston Texans, Philadelphia Eagles and Atlanta Falcons.

== Early life ==
Means was born in Buffalo, New York. He attended Grover Cleveland High School, where he participated on the basketball, track and field, swimming and football teams. Means' father, Steven Means Sr., played football at Buffalo State College. Means has two younger brothers, Brandon and Cameron.

== College career ==
While attending the University at Buffalo, Means was a member of the Bulls football team from 2009 to 2012. In four seasons as a defensive end, Means accumulated 186 total tackles, 30.5 tackles for loss, 19.5 sacks, three forced fumbles, two interceptions and five blocked kicks. He majored in human development and family studies.

== Professional career ==
=== Tampa Bay Buccaneers ===
On April 27, 2013, Means was selected by the Tampa Bay Buccaneers in the fifth round (147th overall) in the 2013 NFL draft. He signed his contract on May 13, 2013, and also got a $191,752 signing bonus on a four-year deal worth $2,351,752. Means appeared in ten games for the Buccaneers during his rookie campaign in 2013. After appearing in the first game of the following season, he was waived on September 9. In eleven games with the Buccaneers over two seasons, Means accumulated six tackles and no sacks.

=== Baltimore Ravens (first stint) ===
The Baltimore Ravens signed Means to their practice squad in October 2014. Means appeared in only one game in 2014 after an injury to offensive tackle Rick Wagner created a vacancy on the roster. On May 7, 2015, Means accepted a $510,000 exclusive-rights tender offer from the Ravens. On September 2, 2015, after suffering a sports hernia, Means was released by the Ravens with an injury settlement.

=== Houston Texans ===
On October 20, 2015, the Houston Texans signed Means to their practice squad.

=== Philadelphia Eagles ===
On December 8, 2015, Means was signed by the Philadelphia Eagles off the Texans' practice squad.

In 2016, the Eagles chose to retain Means following a strong preseason showing. Means was active for the first three weeks of the season and recorded his first solo tackle since his rookie year. Following a Week 4 bye, Means was placed on the inactive list. In a Week 7 game against the Minnesota Vikings, Means, active again due to an injury to Bennie Logan, recorded his first career sack, which also caused Sam Bradford to fumble.

On August 30, 2017, Means signed a one-year contract extension with the Eagles. Means won Super Bowl LII after the Eagles defeated the New England Patriots 41-33.

On September 1, 2018, Means was released by the Eagles.

=== Atlanta Falcons ===
On September 10, 2018, Means signed with the Atlanta Falcons. He played in eight games with four starts, recording 14 combined tackles and one sack.

On February 13, 2019, Means signed a one-year contract extension with the Falcons. On May 22, 2019, Means suffered a season-ending Achilles injury in OTAs and was ruled out for the season.

On March 9, 2020, Means signed a one-year contract extension with the Falcons. He was placed on the reserve/COVID-19 list by the team on August 29, 2020. On September 8, 2020, Means was activated prior to the season opener against the Seattle Seahawks. In Week 12 against the Las Vegas Raiders, Means recorded a strip sack on Derek Carr that was recovered by teammate LaRoy Reynolds during the 43–6 win. In 2020 while with the Falcons, Means was the team's recipient of the 2020 Ed Block Courage Award. The award is given to select NFL players who are voted by their teammates as role models of inspiration, courage, and sportsmanship.

On April 1, 2021, Means re-signed with the Falcons on a one-year contract. In Week 9, Means recovered a fumble and returned it for 32 yards thanks to a James Vaughters strip sack on Trevor Siemian in a 27-25 win over the Saints. Means suffered a knee injury as he was tackled from behind by Saints receiver Tre'Quan Smith. He was placed on injured reserve on November 14, 2021. He was activated on December 4.

=== Baltimore Ravens (second stint) ===
On June 17, 2022, Means signed with the Ravens. He was released on August 30, 2022 and signed to the practice squad the next day. On September 14, the Ravens signed Means to the active roster. He suffered a torn Achilles tendon in Week 2 and was placed on injured reserve on September 19, ending his season.

== Personal life ==
Means grew up a fan of his hometown Buffalo Bills, but admitted to feeling slighted by the organization for passing on him in the draft. He has done charity work for his high school, albeit under the radar. Means is a Christian.
