= Abba P. Schwartz =

American Assistant Secretary of State

4th Assistant Secretary of State for Security and Consular Affairs
- In office October 5, 1962 – March 6, 1966
- Preceded by: John W. Hanes III
- Succeeded by: Barbara M. Watson

Personal details
- Born: April 17, 1916 Baltimore, Maryland
- Died: September 13, 1989 (aged 73)
- Education: Georgetown University (BS); Harvard University (LLB)

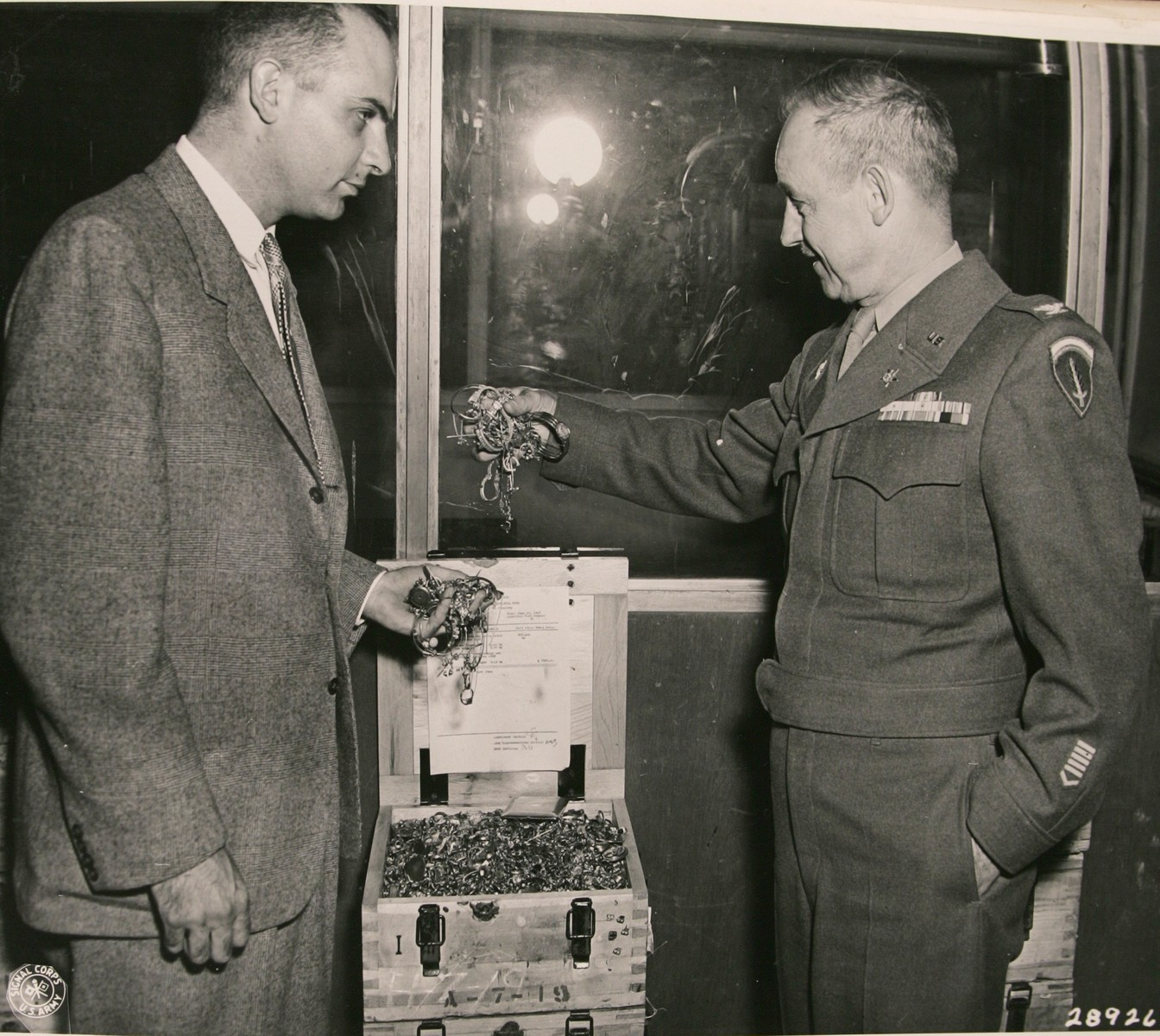
Abba P. Schwartz and Col. William G. Brey in 1947

Abba Philip Schwartz (April 17, 1916 – September 13, 1989) was United States Assistant Secretary of State for Security and Consular Affairs from 1962 to 1966.

== Biography ==
Abba P. Schwartz was born in Baltimore on April 17, 1916. He was educated at the Edmund A. Walsh School of Foreign Service at Georgetown University, receiving a B.S. in Foreign Service in 1936. He then attended Harvard Law School, receiving an LL.B. in 1939.

After law school, Schwartz established a law practice in Washington, D.C. In the wake of the U.S. entry into World War II, 1942 he enlisted in the United States Merchant Marines Cadet Corps. As part of the merchant marine, he participated in operations ferrying supplies to the Soviet Union at Murmansk. In 1944, he became a lieutenant in the United States Navy. He was discharged from the Navy in 1946.

Schwartz then took a job with the Intergovernmental Committee on Refugees in London. In 1947, he joined the United Nations International Refugee Organization in Geneva, serving as reparations director.

In 1949, Schwartz returned to the private practice of law in Washington, D.C. From 1949 to 1962, he was also special legal counsel for the Intergovernmental Committee for European Migration. During the 1950s, he became a close political associate of Sen. John F. Kennedy (D—MA) and his brother Robert F. Kennedy. He also became a trusted adviser of Eleanor Roosevelt.

When John F. Kennedy became President of the United States, he named Schwartz Assistant Secretary of State for Security and Consular Affairs in 1962; after Senate confirmation, Schwartz held this office from October 5, 1962, until March 6, 1966. During his time as Assistant Secretary, Schwartz encouraged Robert F. Kennedy (now United States Attorney General) to exercise the discretion granted to the Attorney General by the Immigration and Nationality Act of 1952 to allow East European refugees and visitors to come to the United States even if they held suspect political views that would otherwise disqualify them. He also negotiated a deal with Cuba that allowed thousands of Cubans to come to the United States as refugees. Schwartz resigned from office abruptly in 1966, amid rumors that he had been hounded out of the United States Department of State by conservatives who disliked his liberal approach to admission of foreign nationals to the U.S.

After leaving the State Department, Schwartz returned to the private practice of law again. In 1967, United States Secretary of Defense Robert McNamara named Schwartz his special assistant for prisoners of war in Vietnam. As such, during the Vietnam War, he promoted programs to help refugees in South Vietnam and to repatriate prisoners taken by the Vietcong and North Vietnamese. Schwartz authored a book, entitled The Open Society, that was published by William Morrow and Company in 1968. In it, he argued for more liberal U.S. immigration policies.

Schwartz died of a heart attack on September 13, 1989.

Government offices
Preceded by John W. Hanes, Jr.	Assistant Secretary of State for Security and Consular Affairs; October 5, 1962 – March 6, 1966	Succeeded by Barbara M. Watson
