= Bennetta Bullock Washington =

American educator and community leader (1917–1991)

- Born: Bennetta Camille Bullock; May 1, 1917; Winston-Salem, North Carolina
- Died: May 28, 1991 (aged 74); Washington, D.C.
- Occupations: educator, director of federal employment program
- Spouse: Walter Washington (m. 1942–1991)

Bennetta Bullock Washington (May 1, 1917 – May 28, 1991) was an American educator and community leader, founder and director of Job Corps for Women, a program of the United States Department of Labor.

== Early life ==
Bennetta Camille Bullock was born in Winston-Salem, North Carolina, one of the eight children of Rev. George Oliver Bullock and Rebecca Bullock. Her father was a prominent Baptist minister. The Bullock family moved to Washington, D.C. when Bennetta was young, and there she attended Dunbar High School and Howard University before she earned a Ph.D. in counseling psychology from Catholic University of America. Her dissertation title was "Background factors and adjustment: A study of the socio-economic and personal factors in the school and subsequent adjustment of a selected group of high school students".

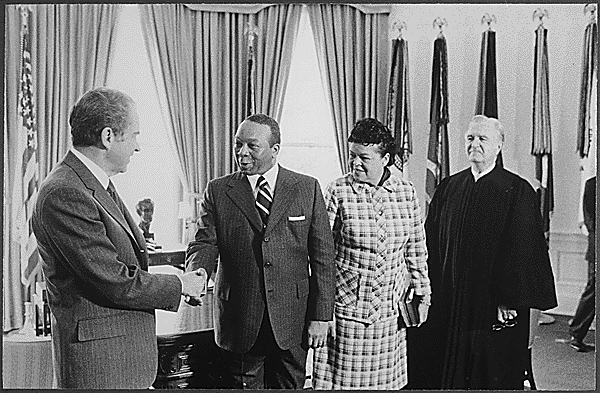
President Richard Nixon shakes hands with Walter Washington after his being sworn in as Mayor-Commissioner of Washington, D.C. Bennetta Bullock Washington stands between her husband and Judge Edward A. Tamm.

== Career ==
Washington taught in Baltimore and Washington before she moved into school administration. She served as principal of Cardozo High School from 1961 to 1964. She was director of the Cardozo Project in Urban Education, and served on the President's Commission on Juvenile Delinquency. From this work came her book, Youth in Conflict: Helping Behavior-Problem Youth in a School Setting (1963). Of her work with troubled students, she commented, "You have to learn how to handle hostility. You don't handle hostility with hostility. It takes receptivity and empathy — don't say sympathy; that's maudlin and doesn't help at all."

As an education specialist, she was a member of John Lindsay's Advisory Panel on Decentralization of New York City Public Schools, in 1967, and was a professor of education at the City College of New York. She was Martin Luther King Scholar in Residence at Rutgers University in 1969.

Beginning in 1964, Bennetta Washington was founder and director of the Job Corps for Women, a program of the U. S. Department of Labor, and in that role oversaw the creation of job training centers for young women throughout the United States. From 1970 to 1973 she was associate director, Women's Programs and Education, in the Manpower Administration of the Department of Labor. She retired from the Department of Labor in 1981.

Washington's husband was Mayor-Commissioner of Washington, D.C. from 1967 to 1975, and mayor from 1975 to 1979. Bennetta Washington was considered the first lady of the District of Columbia during her husband's terms in office, and was a trusted adviser to the mayor. In 1968, she was invited to one of Lady Bird Johnson's lunch meetings of "Women Doers", joining singer Eartha Kitt and others to discuss juvenile delinquency and the Vietnam War. In 1969, she was honored by Wilson College with an honorary doctorate. In 1971, she was honored by the National Council of Negro Women, at the same ceremony honoring Shirley Chisholm, Barbara Watson, and Elizabeth Duncan Koontz. In 1975, Washington hosted a luncheon in honor of visiting first lady of Zambia, Betty Kaunda, at the Museum of African Art, attended by Cecilia Suyat Marshall, Roselyn P. Epps, Dorothy Height, Helen Elsie Austin, and other noted women in Washington.

Washington was one of the participants in a recorded symposium, Kin & Communities, at the Smithsonian Institution in 1977, alongside Rosalynn Carter, Alex Haley, Hubert Humphrey, Margaret Mead, and Sidney Dillon Ripley.

== Personal life ==
Bennetta Bullock married Walter Washington in 1941. They had a daughter, Bennetta Jules-Rosette, who became a sociology professor and a biographer of Josephine Baker. Jules-Rosette confirmed her mother's birthdate as May 1, 1917, stating the 1918 date on some of her mother's documentation is incorrect. Bennetta Bullock Washington died from cardiac arrest in 1991, aged 74 years, in Washington, D.C. The District of Columbia State Board of Education (DCSBOE) offers a Bennetta Bullock Washington Scholarship, named in her memory.
