= Wallace E. Cunningham =

American architectural designer

Wallace Cunningham (born October 18, 1954) is an American architectural designer known for his residential work. He is president and principal designer at San Diego, California–based Wallace E. Cunningham, Inc.

== Biography ==
Cunningham was born in White Township, Pennsylvania. He commenced his formal architectural instruction at Hutchinson Central Technical High School in Buffalo, New York, and then the Chicago Academy of Fine Arts, where he was influenced by Marya Lilien, one of the first female apprentices of Frank Lloyd Wright.

In 1977, Lilien asked Cunningham to accompany her to Wright's Taliesin in Wisconsin and to study at Taliesin West in Scottsdale, Arizona. His first work, while still a student at Taliesin, was Wing House in Rancho Santa Fe, California (1978). In 1979, he founded San Diego–based Wallace E. Cunningham, Inc.

== Awards and honors ==
Cunningham was placed in the "Top 100 Designer" list of Architectural Digest in 2004, 2007, and 2010, and the "Top 30 designers" by Robb Report in 2007. He received an award from the International Academy of Architecture in 2003, and was named an honorary professor by them in 2009. He received a Star of Design Award for Architecture from the Pacific Design Center in 2010. He became a board member of the Taliesin Fellows in 1995, and was their second vice president following Eric Lloyd Wright, Frank Lloyd Wright's grandson.

While most of his works are located in southern California, Cunningham also designed houses in Arizona, Illinois, Nebraska, and Mexico.

In 2006, Yale University Press published Joseph Giovannini's Materializing the Immaterial: The Architecture of Wallace Cunningham. His work was discussed in Dirk Sutro in West Coast Wave: New California Houses

Cunningham and his works have been discussed also in Architectural Digest, San Diego Union-Tribune, Los Angeles Times, Robb Report, San Diego Magazine, San Diego Business Journal, and Journal of Taliesin Fellows In particular, La Jolla’s three-story Razor Bluff house was featured in commercials for Visa Black Card and Calvin Klein. In 2019, the house made headlines when musician Alicia Keys bought it for $20.8 million.

== Bibliography ==
- Global Architecture Houses 103, Projects 2008.
- Global Architecture Houses 98, Projects 2007.
- Materializing the Immaterial, The Architecture of Wallace Cunningham, Yale University Press, October 2006.
- Organic Architecture, Alan Hess, August 2006.
- Global Architecture Houses 92, Projects 2006.
- Art Invention House, Michael Webb, November 2005.
- Global Architecture Houses 86, Projects 2005.
- Ideas en Concreto, Cemex, 2005.
- 1000 Architects, The Images Publishing Group Pty Ltd., 2004.
- Brave New Houses, Michael Webb, October 2003.
- AIA Guidebook, Sutro, January 2003.
- Global Architecture Houses 70, Projects 2002.
- Houses of the World, (German, French, and Spanish Editions) Cerver, 2000.
- Casas de Alta Montaña, Oscar Asensio, 2000.
- Global Architecture Houses 63, Projects 2000.
- Global Architecture Houses 55, Projects 1998.
- Global Architecture Houses 52, Projects 1997.
- Hyperwest, Hess, “American Residential Architecture on the Edge”, 1996.
- Journal of Taliesin Fellows, Van Doren, Issue 19, Spring 1996.
- Global Architecture Houses 48, Projects 1996.
- A Taliesin Legacy, T. Guggenheimer, Van Nostrand Reinhold, New York 1995.
- The Los Angeles House, Street-Porter, New York 1995.
- West Coast Wave, Sutro, Van Nostrand Reinhold, New York 1994.
- Global Architecture Houses 31, Projects 1991.
