= Hutchinson Central Technical High School =

High school in Buffalo, New York, US

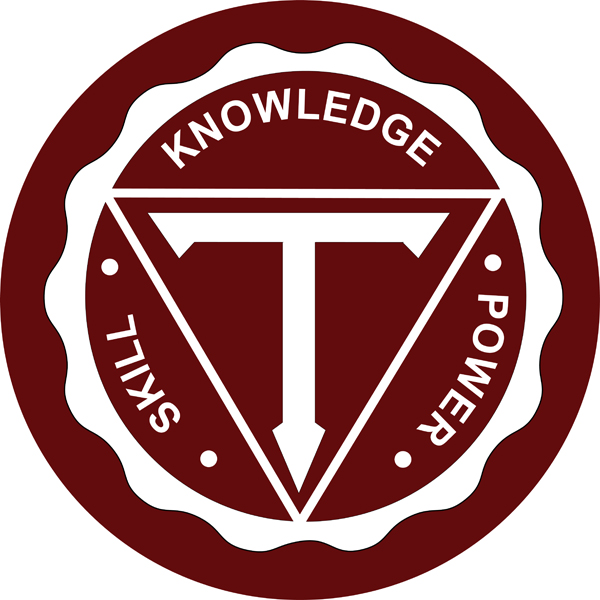

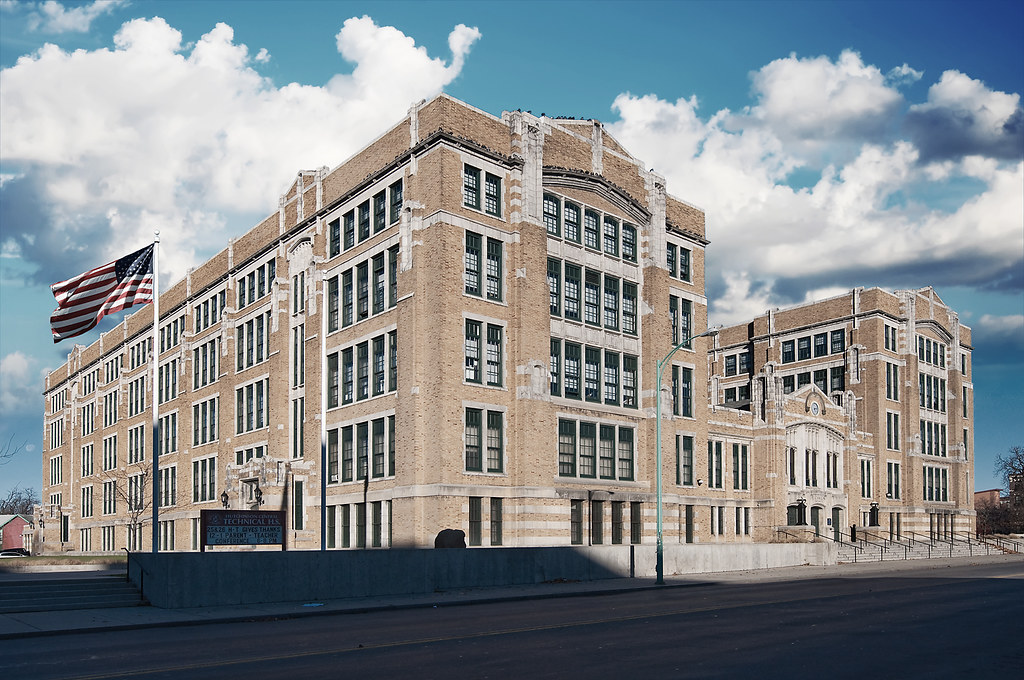

Location
- 356 South Elmwood Ave; Buffalo, New York 14201; United States; 42°53′51″N 78°52′44″W

Information
- Type: Public, Magnet school
- Motto: Skill / Knowledge / Power
- Established: 1904 (as Mechanics Arts); 1954 (as Hutch-Tech)
- Founder: Daniel Upton
- School district: Buffalo Public Schools
- School number: 304
- NCES School ID: 360585000311
- Principal: Daniel Zack
- Teaching staff: 91.05 (on an FTE basis)
- Grades: 9-12
- Enrollment: 1,140 (2024-2025)
- Student to teacher ratio: 12.52
- Campus: City: Large
- Colors: Maroon and White
- Mascot: Engineers
- Newspaper: Techtonian
- Yearbook: Techtonian
- Affiliations: University at Buffalo, SUNY, USNY, NYSED
- Website: www.buffaloschools.org/o/ps304

Hutchinson Central Technical High School, informally known as Hutch-Tech, is a high school in the City of Buffalo, New York. Its founding on September 14, 1904 under the name Mechanics Arts High School marked the beginning of technical education on the secondary level in the city of Buffalo. The principal is Daniel Zack.

== History ==
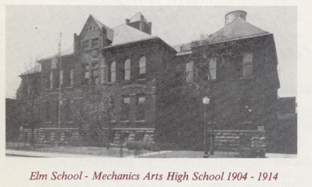
Mechanical High Elm Street School c. 1914

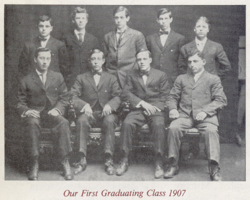
Mechanical High First Graduating Class c. 1907

The school was first housed in the then Elementary School No. 11 on Elm Street near Clinton Street. Daniel Upton, the founder of the school and its first principal, began operations with a faculty of four teachers and a pupil registration of sixty-four.

In September 1905, the school's name was changed to Technical High School, pending the move to a new building to be built on Cedar Street and Clinton Ave; the cornerstone was laid on November 14, 1912. The Cedar Street building opened on July 14, 1918, with an enrollment of 1009 students, 863 boys and 146 girls. It offered evening classes, the first of its kind in Buffalo at the time.

The program of studies at Technical High School differed from that of other Buffalo high schools, in its introduction of Industrial Chemistry Machine Design, Engineering College Preparatory, Electrical, Commercial Art and Building Design and Construction to the program of the high school at this point.

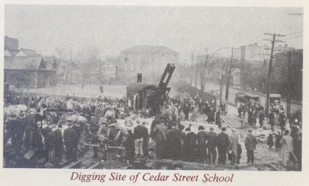
Technical High School Corner Stone laying and earth breaking c. 1912

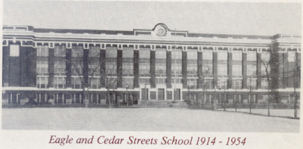
Technical High School Cedar and Clinton, c. 1914

The school received a charter from the Regents of the State of New York (now the New York State Education Department) under the name Technical High School of Buffalo in 1918, and remained in this building until 1954. In the spring of 1921, Tech began issuing entrance exams and became what is now known as a magnet school, even though with its course load it would normally fall into the classification of a vocational-technical school. That practice still continues today to help select classes, which now consist of roughly 200-300 students.

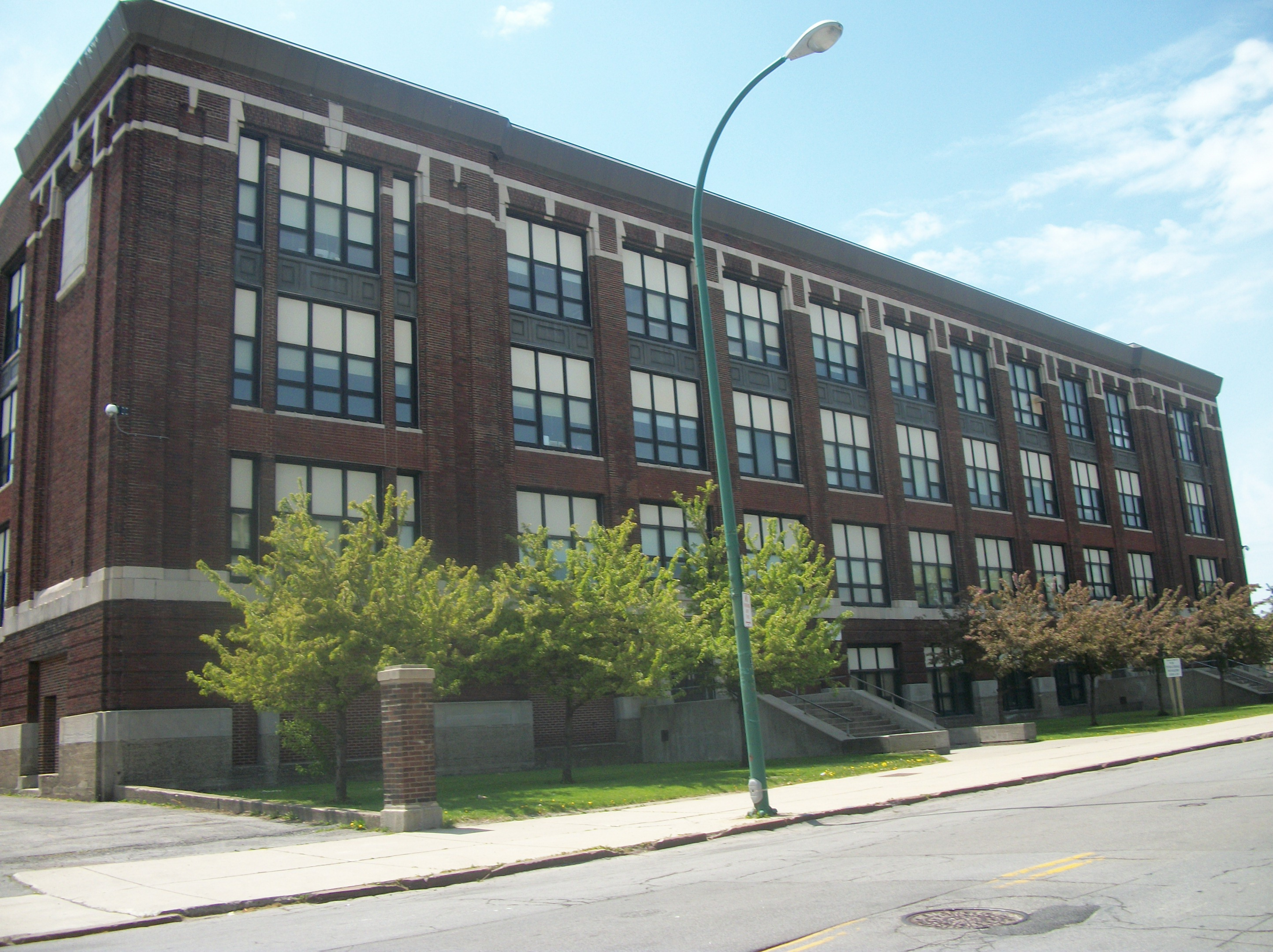
Technical High School building in May 2012

The school was in great demand during its forty years of instruction at this location. Most of Technical High School's equipment was transferred to the building formerly occupied by Hutchinson Central High School. This building, located at South Elmwood Avenue and Chippewa Street, was completely renovated, remodeled and repainted. It is located within the boundaries of the West Village Historic District.

Hutch-Tech was one of the world's first high schools with a digital computer, acquiring an IBM 1620 (Level C) in 1961. This computer, with 20,000 BCD words of memory, was quite advanced for the time, and classes were taught in assembly language, symbolic programming, Fortran, COBOL, and numerical analysis. Many Hutch-Tech graduates from the 1960s became pioneers in computing. Perhaps the best known of these is astronomer and computer security expert Clifford Stoll.

The curriculum has been revamped and expanded continuously over the second half of the 20th century, for entrance into schools of engineering and or the training of technicians for entry-level positions in current technical fields. The programs the school now offers includes bio-chemical technology, computer technology, and engineering technology. Instruction in electricity and electronics is also provided. Hutch-Tech also offers a selection of college prep courses including Advanced Placement that both helped their major, and helped them meet their general education requirements that most colleges require. The courses include AP English Language and Composition, AP English Literature and Composition, AP Biology, AP Chemistry, AP Calculus, AP Spanish Language, AP Physics-C, and AP United States History.

More recently the building was set for renovation as part of a citywide plan to renovate dozen of schools in the city of Buffalo. The renovation took place from the summer of 2005 until the summer of 2007. The "New" building has more and updated classrooms with Promethean Ltd smart boards, a brand new gymnasium, new engineering and electrical equipment, and new science rooms. While the building was being renovated, school operations took place at Kensington High School on the city's East Side.

David Greco, retired 2010

At the end of the 2010 School Year, David Greco retired after nearly fifteen years of service as head administrator at Hutch-Tech, and nearly twenty-five years as a history teacher, and administrator elsewhere, including Bennett High School, Buffalo Traditional, and others. This is five years later than his original retirement date of 2005, but Greco made a promise to see the renovations through, and see the students back to the building on South Elmwood. Greco's successor was Sabatino Cimato.

In November 2015, Sabatino Cimato was appointed to associate superintendent in charge of leadership for Buffalo Public Schools. Dr. Gabrielle Morquecho was named interim principal for the remainder of the school year. In July 2016, Morquecho was appointed Principal of Hutch-Tech. In 2023, Dr. Daniel Zack became the new Principal after Dr. Morquecho retired.

== Alumni Association ==
Beginning in the Fall of 2022, Class of 1990 classmates Richard Pyszczek and Todd Espinosa began building the structure of an alumni association. Throughout 2023, they slowly recruited others to form the first executive board and held their first official meeting in January 2024. During the Hutch Tech Alumni Association's (HTAA) March 2024 Meeting, Todd Espinosa was elected as the group's first President. Other Officers elected included: Dr. Giovanna Claudio-Cotto (c/o 2000, Principal of PS156: Olmstead High School)- Vice President, Dr. LaFraya Wilson (c/o 1995, Assistant Principal of PS 94: West Hertel Academy) - Treasurer, Norm Duttweiler (c/o 1991, Hutch Tech Teacher) - Vice Treasurer, Robyn Cross (Hutch Tech Teacher) -Recording Secretary, Kara McGuire (c/o 1992, Former HT Parent Liaison) - Corresponding Secretary, and Bruce Supernault (c/o 1973) - Sgt-at-Arms. Other Executive Board Members included: Takenya Allison (c/o 1990), Chris Austin (c/o 1990), Dr. Darren Brown (c/o 1991, former BPS Chief of Staff and Interim Superintendent), Brandon Howard (c/o 1990), Jason Jaskula (c/o 1989), Richard Pyszczek (c/o 1990, HTAA Co-Founder), Timarie Schipani (c/o 1993), and Dr. Daniel Zack (Hutch Tech Principal).

On November 3rd, 2025 the HTAA held their Premiere Event. At this event, they announced their existence, Mission Statement, and future projects to the Hutch Tech community. Distinguished Alumni who spoke at the event included noted Astronomer and Cybersecurity Icon Clifford Stoll (c/o 1968) and All Elite Wrestling Pro Wrestler Daniel Garcia (c/o 2016). The HTAA's Website can be found at: https://sites.google.com/view/htalumni/home The HTAA's Facebook Page can be found at: https://www.facebook.com/groups/1265798304948894.

== Extra-curricular activities ==
The school offers a number of extra-curricular activities. Sports teams include: football, basketball, baseball, softball, soccer, hockey, swimming, rowing, golf, and track.

== In the news ==
In recognition of its unique programs and past accomplishments, Hutchinson Central Technical High School was honored as a National School of Excellence in 1988–1989 by the U.S. Department of Education. In 1996, Redbook magazine cited HCTHS as one of the top 150 high schools in the country.

In October 2005, the New York Civil Liberties Union successfully pressured the school to release students from their mandatory Junior ROTC program, arguing that the practice violates the State's Education Law, which provides that no child may be enrolled in JROTC without prior written parental consent. In the end, Greco did release the student in question, and all others, but not without the attention of the local media. WGRZ, the local NBC broadcast channel, carried the story, as did the local publication Artvoice.

On November 21, 2008, John Hoffmeister, former CEO of Shell Oil in Houston, spoke to the student body about alternative energy, in an event organized by the Buffalo Urban League.

Following the theft of a student's bicycle from Hutch Tech in March 2009, the administration announced a policy that in essence banned bike riding to and from the school. The student brought the matter before the Buffalo school board, and the first bike rack at Hutch Tech was installed, contributed by a local bicycling advocacy group. The superintendent of schools expressed a desire and plan for bike racks throughout the Buffalo Public School District.

In 2009, Hutchinson Central Technical High School was ranked 86th out of 131 Western New York high schools in terms of academic performance.

In the 2011 U.S. News & World Report analysis of United States Best High Schools, Hutch Tech received a Bronze Star for exceeding state performance in its Poverty-Adjusted Performance Index, and greatly exceeding overall state average performance by its disadvantaged students. The school's college readiness score prevented receiving a higher ranking.

In the 2013 analysis of United States Best High Schools, Hutch Tech was upgraded to receive a Silver Award for far exceeding state performance in its Poverty-Adjusted Performance Index, exceeding state average performance when not Poverty-Adjusted, as well as an improved college readiness score.

== Notable alumni ==
- Harold Arlen, Academy Award winning Composer most famous for writing the music for Over the Rainbow from the Wizard of Oz.
- Michael Bennett, Pulitzer Prize and Tony Award-winning Choreographer (Attended for 2 years.)
- Charles F. Blair Jr., American Aviation Pioneer 1909–1978
- Charles Clough, Painter
- Wallace E. Cunningham, Noted Architect
- Michael Curry, 27th presiding Bishop of the United States Episcopal Church
- Daniel Garcia, Pro Wrestler for All Elite Wrestling
- Chester A. Kowal, Buffalo Mayor, 1962–1965
- Stanley M. Makowski, Buffalo Mayor, 1974–1977
- Kevin Roberson, Standout Basketball Player at the University of Vermont
- Trini E. Ross- United States Attorney for the Western District of New York, 2021–2025
- Abdi Salim, Professional Soccer Player
- Frank A. Sedita, Buffalo Mayor, 1958–1961, 1966–1973
- Clifford Stoll, Astronomer, Inventor, Computer Security Expert And Icon.
- Leonard F. Walentynowicz, Former Assistant Secretary of State
- Grover Washington Jr., Grammy Award-Winning Saxophonist 1967–1999

== Former principals ==
Previous assignment and reason for departure denoted in parentheses

- Daniel Upton – 1904–1909 (Teacher - Mechanic Arts High School, named Principal of State Normal School in Buffalo)
- Author S. Harrell – 1909-1916 (unknown, named Assistant Superintendent of Indianapolis Public Schools)
- David H. Childs – 1916–1935
- Richard R. Dry – 1935–1946 (Vice Principal - Hutchinson Central Technical High School, unknown)
- C. Gordon Ryther – 1946–1947 (Vice Principal - Hutchinson Central Technical High School, returned to VP post)
- Martin H. Kuehn – 1947–1959 (unknown, died)
- Ernest Zeferjahn – 1960–1971 (unknown, retired)
- Russell Guest [interim] – 1971 (Assistant Principal - Hutchinson Central Technical High School, retired)
- Martin J. O'Donnell – 1971–1974 (Principal - Grover Cleveland High School, retired)
- Anthony D. Vetrano – 1974–1986 (Principal - Fillmore Middle School, named Director of Vocational Education for Buffalo Public Schools)
- Joseph Gentile – 1986–1990 & 1991-1994 (unknown, named Principal of Clarence High School)
- Barbara Schnell – 1990-1991 (unknown)
- David M. Greco – 1994–2010 (Principal - Buffalo Traditional School, retired)
- Sabatino Cimato – 2010–2015 (Principal - North Park Academy, named Associate Superintendent in Charge of Leadership of Buffalo Public Schools)
- Gabrielle Morquecho – 2015-2023 (Principal, retired)
- Daniel Zack – 2023–Present (Principal)
