= Walter Washington =

Mayor of the District of Columbia from 1975 to 1979

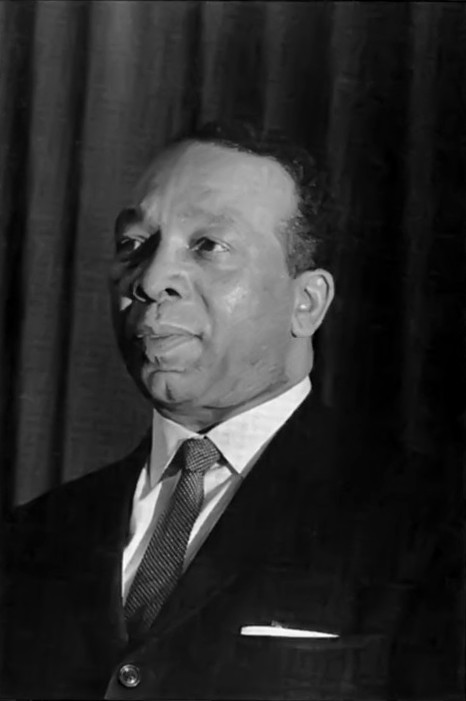

1st Mayor of the District of Columbia
- In office January 2, 1975 – January 2, 1979
- Preceded by: Himself (Mayor-Commissioner)
- Succeeded by: Marion Barry

Mayor-Commissioner of the District of Columbia
- In office November 7, 1967 – January 2, 1975
- President: Lyndon B. Johnson; Richard Nixon; Gerald Ford
- Deputy: Thomas Fletcher; Graham Watt
- Preceded by: Walter Tobriner (President of the Board of Commissioners)
- Succeeded by: Himself (Mayor)

Personal details
- Born: Walter Edward Washington; April 15, 1915 Dawson, Georgia, U.S.
- Died: October 27, 2003 (aged 88) Washington, D.C., U.S.
- Resting place: Lincoln Memorial Cemetery
- Party: Democratic
- Spouses: Bennetta Bullock (m. 1942; died 1991); Mary Burke (m. 1994)
- Children: 1
- Education: Howard University (BA, LLB)
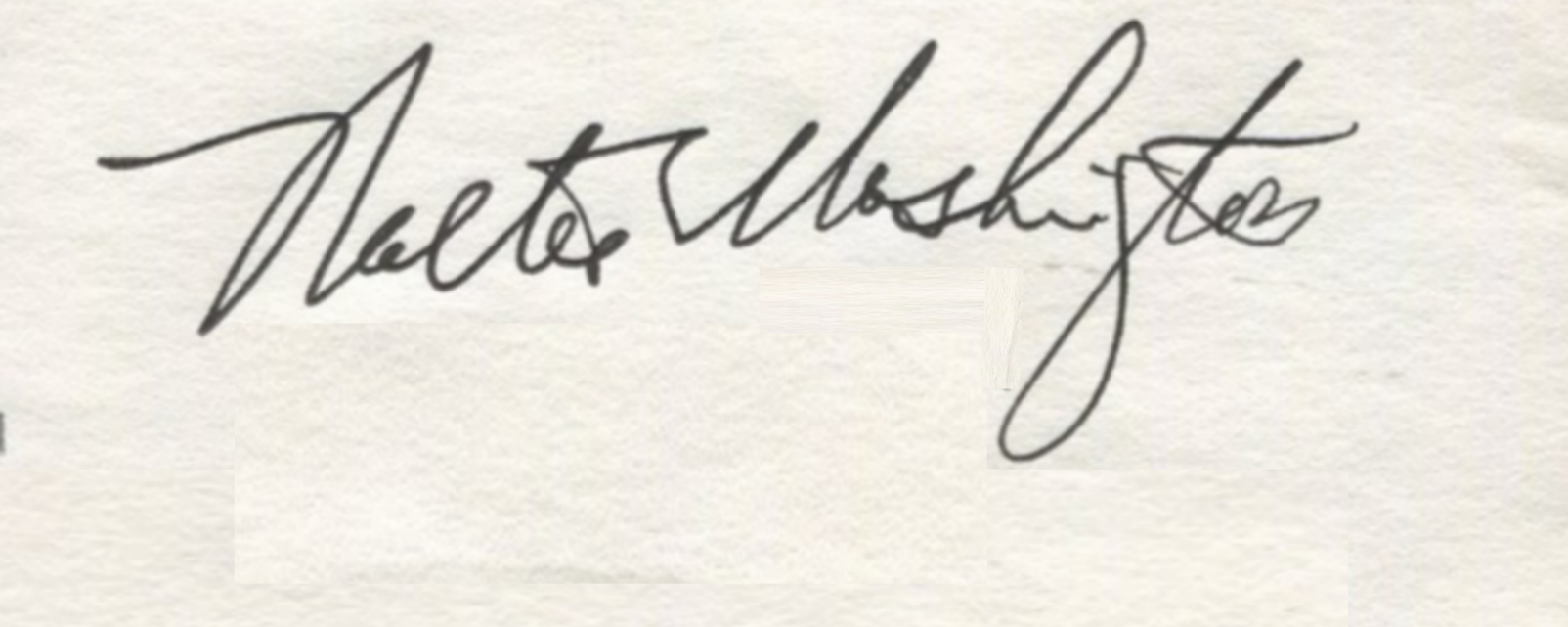
- Signature

Walter Edward Washington (April 15, 1915 – October 27, 2003) was an American civil servant and politician. After a career in public housing, Washington was the chief executive of the District of Columbia from 1967 to 1979, serving as the first and only Mayor-Commissioner of the District of Columbia from 1967 to 1974, and as the first Mayor of the District of Columbia from 1975 to 1979.

He was the first African-American mayor of a major city in the United States, and in 1974 became the capital's first popularly elected mayor since 1871. Congress had passed a law granting home rule to the capital, while reserving some authorities. Washington won the first mayoral election in 1974, and served from 1975 until 1979.

== Early life and family ==
Washington was the great-grandson of enslaved Americans. He was born in Dawson, Georgia. His family moved North in the Great Migration, and Washington was raised in Jamestown, New York, attending public schools. He earned a bachelor's degree from Howard University and a law degree from Howard University School of Law. He was a member of Omega Psi Phi fraternity.

Washington married Bennetta Bullock, an educator. They had one daughter together, Bennetta Jules-Rosette, who became a sociologist. His wife Bennetta Washington became a director of the Women's Job Corps, and First Lady of the District of Columbia when he was mayor. She died in 1991.

== Career ==
After graduating from Howard in 1948, Washington was hired as a supervisor for D.C.'s Alley Dwelling Authority. He worked for the authority until 1961, when he was appointed by President John F. Kennedy as the Executive Director of the National Capital Housing Authority. This was the housing department of the District of Columbia, which was then administered by Congress. In 1966 Washington moved to New York City to head the much larger Housing Authority there in the administration of Mayor John Lindsay.

== Mayor of the District of Columbia ==
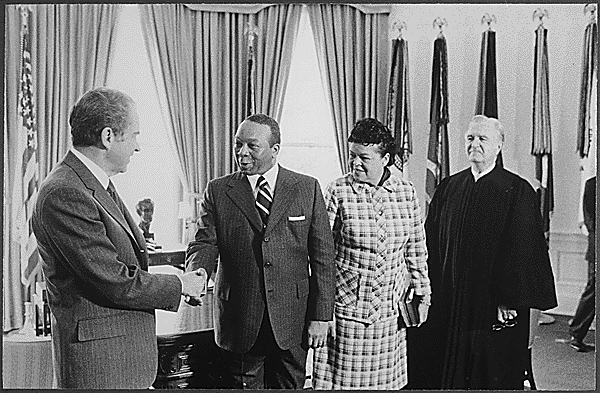
Walter Washington shakes hands with Pres. Richard Nixon after being sworn in as mayor-commissioner in 1973.

=== 1967-1975: Mayor-Commissioner ===
In 1967, President Lyndon Johnson used his reorganization power under Reorganization Plan No. 3 of 1967 to replace the three-commissioner government that had run the capital since 1871 under congressional supervision. Johnson implemented a more modern government headed by a single commissioner, assistant commissioner, and a nine-member city council, all appointed by the president. Johnson appointed Washington as Commissioner, which by this time had been informally retitled as "Mayor-Commissioner." (Power brokers such as Katharine Graham, publisher of the Washington Post, had supported white lawyer Edward Bennett Williams.) Washington was the first African-American mayor of a major American city, and one of three Black men in 1967 chosen to lead major cities. Richard Hatcher of Gary, Indiana, and Carl Stokes of Cleveland were elected that year.

Washington inherited a city that was torn by racial divisions, and also had to deal with conservative congressional hostility following passage of major civil rights legislation. When he sent his first budget to Congress in late 1967, Democratic Representative John L. McMillan, chair of the House Committee on the District of Columbia, responded by having a truckload of watermelons delivered to Washington's office.

In April 1968, the District of Columbia faced riots following the assassination of Martin Luther King Jr. Although reportedly urged by FBI director J. Edgar Hoover to shoot rioters, Washington refused. He later told The Washington Post in 1999, "I walked by myself through the city and urged angry young people to go home. I asked them to help the people who had been burned out." Only one person refused to listen to him. His actions are credited with helping prevent large-scale riots in the area.

Republican President Richard Nixon retained Washington after being elected as president in 1968.

In 1971, the United States Department of Justice prohibited an anti-Vietnam demonstration on Pennsylvania Avenue. There were public concerns that violence would spark. Washington visited the White House, and he requested that President Nixon issue permits for the demonstration. The request was honored, and the demonstration commenced with 250,000 marchers.

=== 1975-1979: Elected Mayor ===
Congress enacted the District of Columbia Self-Rule and Governmental Reorganization Act on December 24, 1973, providing for an elected mayor and city council. In early 1974, Washington began a vigorous campaign to win the Democratic nomination for the mayoral election. As the District of Columbia was heavily Democratic and (at the time) majority black, it was taken for granted that whoever won the Democratic primary would become the city's first popularly-elected mayor since 1871.

Washington faced six challengers in the Democratic primary. However, the primary eventually became a two-way contest between Washington and Clifford Alexander, future Army Secretary. Washington won the tight race by 4,000 votes. As expected, he won the November general election with a large majority. Home rule took effect when Washington and the newly elected council–the city's first popularly-elected government in over a century–were sworn into office January 2, 1975. Washington was sworn in by Supreme Court Justice Thurgood Marshall.

Although personally beloved by residents, some who nicknamed him "Uncle Walter," Washington slowly found himself overcome by the problems of managing what was the equivalent of a combination state and city government. The Washington Post opined that he lacked "command presence." Council chair Sterling Tucker, who wanted to be Mayor, suggested that the problems in the District of Columbia were because of Washington's inability to manage city services. Council Member Marion Barry, another rival, accused him of "bumbling and bungling in an inefficiently run city government." Washington was also constrained by the fact that then as now, the Constitution vested Congress with ultimate authority over the District. Congress thus retained veto power over acts passed by the council, and many matters were subject to council approval.

The Washington Monthly noted that Washington's "gentle ways did not move the city's bureaucracy. Neither did it satisfy the black voters' yearning to see the city run by blacks for blacks. Walter Washington was black, but many blacks were suspicious that he was still too tied to the mostly white power structure that had run the city when he was a commissioner." During his administration he started many new initiatives, for example, the Office of Latino Affairs of the District of Columbia.

In the 1978 Democratic mayoral primary, Washington finished third behind Barry and Tucker. He left office on January 2, 1979. Upon his departure from office, he announced that the city had posted a $41 million budget surplus, based on the Federal government's cash accounting system. When Barry took office, he shifted city finances to the more common accrual system, and he announced that under this system, the city actually had a $284 million deficit.

== Later life ==
After ending his term as mayor, Washington joined the New York-based law firm of Burns, Jackson, Miller & Summit, becoming a partner. He opened the firm's Washington, D.C. office.

His first wife, Bennetta, died in 1991. In 1994, he married Mary Burke Nicholas, an economist and government official. She died November 30, 2014, at age 88.

Washington went into semi-retirement in the mid-1990s. He fully retired at the end of the decade in his early eighties. Washington remained a beloved public figure in the District and was much sought after for his political commentary and advice. In 2002, he endorsed Anthony A. Williams for a second mayoral term. Washington's endorsement carried sufficient weight to be noted by all local news outlets.

Washington died at Howard University Hospital on October 27, 2003. Hundreds of mourners came to see him lying in state at the John A. Wilson Building (City Hall), and also attended his funeral at Washington National Cathedral.

== Legacy and honors ==
- 13½ Street, the short alley running alongside the east side of the Wilson Building, was designated Walter E. Washington Way in his honor.
- A new housing development in Ward 8 was named the Walter E. Washington Estates.
- In 2006, the Council of the District of Columbia named the Washington Convention Center at 801 Mt. Vernon Place NW, as the Walter E. Washington Convention Center.

== See also ==
- List of first African-American mayors

Political offices
Preceded by Walter Tobriner as President of the Board of Commissioners of the District of Columbia	Mayor-Commissioner of the District of Columbia; 1967–1975	Succeeded by Himself as Mayor of the District of Columbia
Preceded by Himself as Mayor-Commissioner of the District of Columbia	Mayor of the District of Columbia; 1975–1979	Succeeded by Marion Barry
Party political offices
First	Democratic nominee for Mayor of the District of Columbia; 1974	Succeeded by Marion Barry
