= John Wesley Hanes III =

John W. Hanes III
- Born: March 31, 1925; New York, New York, United States
- Died: June 9, 2018 (aged 93)
- Education: Deerfield Academy, Yale University
- Occupations: Civil servant, Investment banker
- Board member of: Wertheim & Co.
- Spouse: Lucy P. Deans (m. 1949; died 1976)
- Children: 4
- Parent(s): John Wesley Hanes & Agnes Mitchel

John Wesley Hanes III

3rd Assistant Secretary of State for Security and Consular Affairs
- In office January 1, 1959 – October 4, 1962
- Preceded by: Roderic L. O'Connor
- Succeeded by: Abba P. Schwartz

John Wesley Hanes III (known as John W. Hanes Jr.; March 31, 1925 – June 9, 2018) was a U.S. civil servant.

== Early years ==
Hanes was born in New York City and graduated from Deerfield Academy in Massachusetts in 1943. His father was a New York financier. Hanes served in the U.S. Army from 1943 to 1946 and then worked in the Office of High Commissioner for Germany for 3 years. He received a B.A. from Yale University in 1950.

== Career ==
Hanes began his government career with the State Department in 1950. While serving in the State Department Hanes was involved in a variety of public relations activities including media interviews and speeches. He also provided congressional testimony on State Department issues, addressed professional conferences, did a small amount of writing, and served on committees and commissions within and on behalf of the State Department. After spending approximately one and one-half years as an economic analyst he transferred to the Central Intelligence Agency. Secretary of State John Foster Dulles appointed him one of his special assistants in 1953. He handled special projects and assignments of a diverse nature for the Secretary, especially during the period 1953–1957 when serving as his Special Assistant. In the mid-1950s Hanes worked with Dulles in developing plans for the disposition of Dulles’ personal papers. As part of those activities Hanes was involved in drafting changes to Executive Order 10501 dealing with the safe-guarding of official information. After Dulles’ death Hanes actively participated in administrative duties related to the papers. He served as a member of the committee which Dulles designated for the purpose of exercising control over his papers after his death.

In November 1958, after serving for two years as deputy assistant secretary for international organization affairs, he was named to head the State Department's Bureau of Security and Consular Affairs, taking that new position in January 1959.

At the end of the Eisenhower administration he resigned from government service and became an investment banker.

== Personal life ==
Hanes married Lucy Deans. They had three daughters and a son. She died in 1976. He died at age 93 on June 9, 2018.

Government offices
Preceded by Roderic L. O'Connor	Assistant Secretary of State for Security and Consular Affairs; January 1, 1959 – October 4, 1962	Succeeded by Abba P. Schwartz
