= Roderic L. O'Connor =

American government official

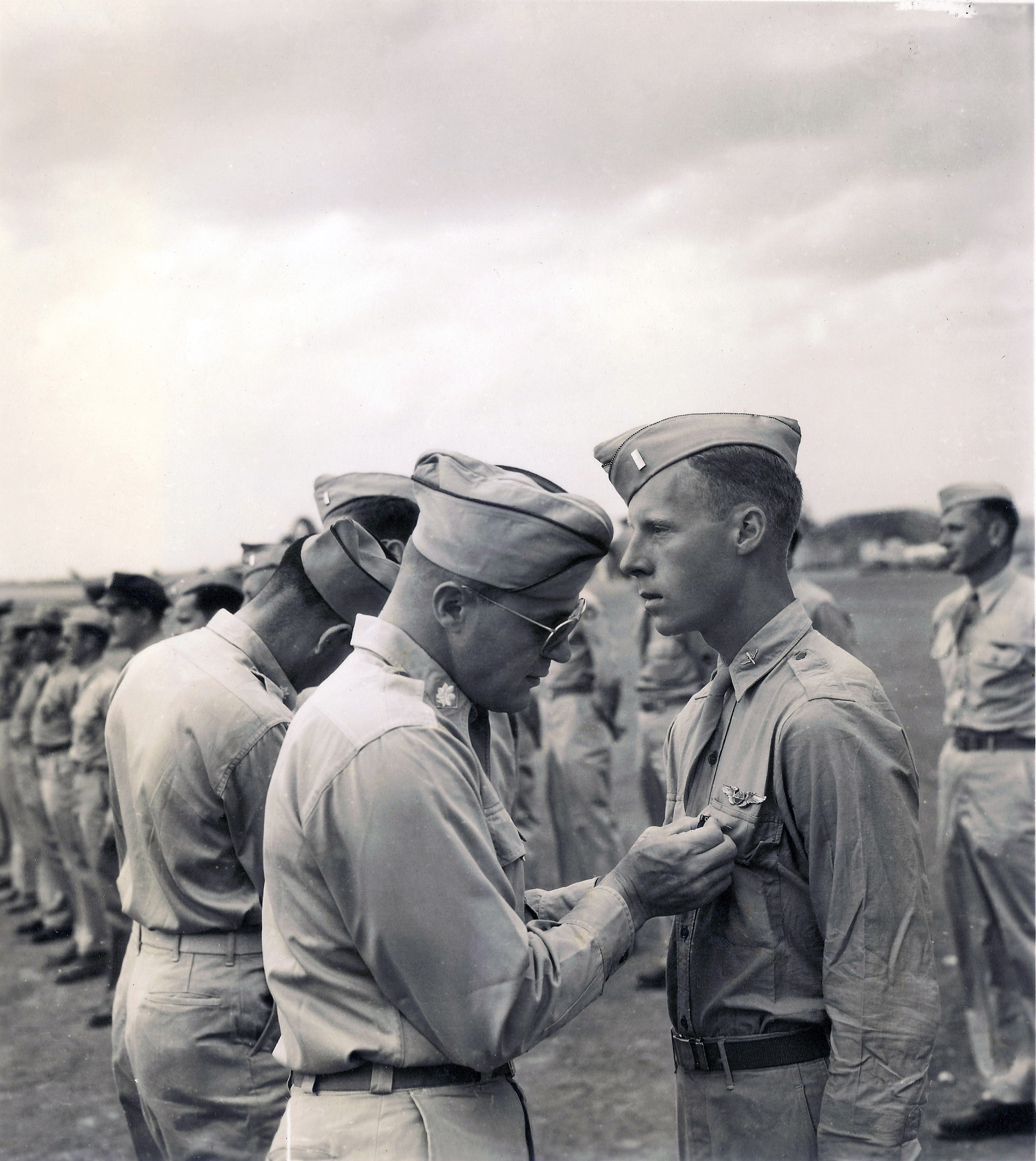

2nd Assistant Secretary of State for Security and Consular Affairs
- In office May 28, 1957 – December 29, 1958
- President: Dwight D. Eisenhower
- Preceded by: R. W. Scott McLeod
- Succeeded by: John Wesley Hanes III

Personal details
- Born: Roderic L. O'Connor; August 10, 1921 Manhattan, New York City, U.S.
- Died: October 24, 1982 (aged 61) Far Hills, New Jersey, U.S.
- Education: Yale University

Military service
- Allegiance: United States
- Branch/service: United States Air Force
- Years of service: 1943–1945
- Unit: United States Army Air Corps; 15th Expeditionary Mobility Task Force
- Battles/wars: World War II
- Awards: Order of Orange-Nassau

Roderic L. O'Connor (August 10, 1921 – October 24, 1982) was a United States lawyer and official in the United States Department of State.

== Biography ==
Roderic Ladew O'Connor was raised in Manhattan, a member of a third-generation family of Irish-Catholics. He was educated at St. Paul's School in Concord, New Hampshire, and then at Yale University, graduating in 1943.

During World War II, O'Connor served in the United States Army Air Forces as a navigator in the 15th Expeditionary Mobility Task Force from March 1943 to October 1945. He flew over 50 combat missions and for his service during the war was made a Commander of the Order of Oranje-Nassau by the government of the Netherlands. After the war, O'Connor enrolled at Yale Law School, receiving his law degree in 1947.

After law school, O'Connor worked as an associate attorney with Kelley, Drye, Newhall & Marshall from 1947 until 1949. In 1949, Governor of New York Thomas E. Dewey appointed John Foster Dulles as United States Senator from New York, after the resignation of Robert F. Wagner. Dulles selected O'Connor as his administrative assistant, but served for only a few months before losing a special election to Herbert H. Lehman. O'Connor then traveled to Germany to provide legal advice to the United States Department of Defense.

After the 1952 presidential election, John Foster Dulles became United States Secretary of State; Dulles appointed O'Connor as his special assistant in 1953. In this capacity, he accompanied Dulles to the 1954 meeting of foreign ministers in Berlin, a ninepower meeting in London in 1954 and the heads-of-Government fourpower meeting in Geneva in 1955. From 1956 to 1959, he served two terms as U.S. representative on the Caribbean Commission.

In 1957, Secretary Dulles designated O'Connor as Assistant Secretary of State for Security and Consular Affairs; O'Connor held this office from May 28, 1957 until December 29, 1958.

O'Connor left government service, becoming vice-president of Ciba-Geigy from 1959 to 1969.

In 1969, President Richard Nixon appointed O'Connor as assistant administrator for East Asia operations of the United States Agency for International Development. In 1971, he became USAID's coordinator of supporting assistance, in which capacity he was responsible for aid to East Asia and the Middle East.

O'Connor died at the Veterans' Hospital in Far Hills, New Jersey on October 24, 1982, at the age of 61.

Government offices
Preceded by R. W. Scott McLeod	Assistant Secretary of State for Security and Consular Affairs; May 28, 1957 – December 29, 1958	Succeeded by John W. Hanes Jr.
