= R. W. Scott McLeod =

American politician (1914-1961)

Scott McLeod

1st Assistant Secretary of State for Security and Consular Affairs
- In office March 3, 1953 – March 9, 1957
- President: Dwight D. Eisenhower
- Preceded by: new office
- Succeeded by: Roderic L. O'Connor

United States Ambassador to Ireland
- In office July 17, 1957 – March 15, 1961
- President: Dwight D. Eisenhower
- Preceded by: William Howard Taft III
- Succeeded by: Grant Stockdale

Personal details
- Born: June 7, 1914 Davenport, Iowa, U.S.
- Died: November 7, 1961 (aged 47) Concord, New Hampshire, U.S.
- Party: Republican
- Spouse: Edna Van Pappelendam
- Children: 3
- Education: Grinnell College
- Profession: FBI agent, Civil servant, Diplomat

Robert Walter Scott McLeod (June 7, 1914 – November 7, 1961) headed the U.S. Department of State's Bureau for Security and Consular Affairs from 1953 to 1957 and served as U.S. Ambassador to Ireland from 1957 to 1961. He was the principal U.S. government official responsible for the purge of those charged with disloyalty or homosexuality from the State Department during the McCarthy era.

== Early years ==
Scott McLeod was born in Davenport, Iowa, on June 17, 1914. He played football at Grinnell College and graduated with a B.A. in 1937.

After college, McLeod sold advertising for the Des Moines Register and Tribune. In 1938, he took a job as a police reporter for the Cedar Rapids Gazette. He joined the Federal Bureau of Investigation in 1942 and worked as a special agent. Assigned to the FBI's Concord, New Hampshire, office, he left the FBI in 1949 to become an administrative assistant in the office of Republican U.S. Senator Styles Bridges of New Hampshire, an anti-Communist and anti-gay crusader who kept a lower profile than his colleague Joe McCarthy from Wisconsin. While working for Bridges, McLeod helped write the Republican attack on President Truman for removing General Douglas MacArthur from command.

== State Department ==
When John Foster Dulles became Secretary of State in 1953, on the recommendation of Under Secretary of State for Management Donold Lourie, he named McLeod as the administrator of the State Department's Bureau of Security and Consular Affairs. McLeod held that office from March 3, 1953, until March 9, 1957. Until January 1956, he was also responsible for the State Department's relations with Congress. His appointment was viewed as an attempt by Dulles to appease Republican critics of the State Department. During his years at the State Department, McLeod was "a figure of sharp controversy".

In 1953, McLeod provided Secretary Dulles with a report suggesting Charles E. Bohlen, a career diplomat whom Dulles was considering for Ambassador to the Soviet Union, was a security risk. When Dulles supported Bohlen's nomination, McLeod communicated his concerns to the White House, but Dulles chose not to use his insubordination to remove him. McLeod denied charges that he improperly furnished State Department information to Senator Joseph McCarthy, Republican of Wisconsin, and said he had no personal relationship with him. He denied making statements that opponents of the nomination attributed to him. At other times he spoke with pride of his closeness to McCarthy and kept a photo of the senator on his desk. In October 1953, the Community Chest, a charity, reported complaints that McLeod was coercing employees under his supervision to contribute. On January 16, 1954, a group of former ambassadors denounced his attacks on the State Department. McLeod called their charges a "scandalous libel". In February 1954, Democrats denounced the speeches he made for the Republican Party, calling him a "party huckster". McLeod himself later said the speaking tour might have been "ill advised" and admitted he worried he might lose his job over it. Though some thought he had violated the Hatch Act, State Department counsel ruled that he was not covered by the act's prohibitions on political activity by certain government employees. In March 1954, Dulles relieved McLeod of responsibility for personnel administration, leaving him with security only, though a week earlier McLeod had told a congressional committee that the two functions were "inseparable". When criticized for slow progress in implementing the Refugee Relief Act (1953), which expanded immigration from southern Europe, he blamed complexity that Congress had added to the legislation and proposed easing its requirements. Life thought him right about the statute, but called him "a pleasant but unimaginative flatfoot" whose firing "would be no great loss". In 1956, his erstwhile conservative allies viewed him as a traitor when he supported the Eisenhower administration's immigration reform proposals.

McLeod had principal responsibility for implementing the security rules established in Eisenhower's Executive Order 10450, which covered both disloyalty based on political views and affiliation and security risks based on character, stability, and reliability, which translated into sexual irregularity. McLeod directed the security investigations that resulted in the departure, either by dismissal or by resignation under pressure, of some 300 State Department employees on suspicion they were Communist sympathizers and of 425 State Department employees for suspicion of homosexuality. For columnists who did not sympathize with the administration's security campaign, McLeod personified its worst excesses. One described him as "a shadow that lurk[s] over every desk and every conference table at Foggy Bottom" and another called him "one of the most powerful and controversial officials in the United States government." Stewart Alsop wrote that "McLeodism" was "the State Department's dutiful imitation of McCarthyism." Bridges, who had first brought the issue of homosexuals in the State Department to public attention in 1947, may have been the driver behind McLeod's purge of homosexuals from State. McLeod told a congressional committee at the start of his tenure at State that "The campaign toward eliminating all types of sex perverts from the rolls of the department will be pressed with increased vigor. All forms of immorality will be rooted out and banished from the service." A friend of McLeod's described his law enforcement approach to homosexuality: "Scotty had the essentially simple approach to a fairy that you will find in a cop who has never had the benefit of, let us say, courses in abnormal psychology at Yale. ... Scotty had a very black and white kind of approach–and this wasn't white." He took a flexible approach to security issues, weighing, for example, how recent or extensive someone's contacts with leftists were, but viewed any homosexual activity as disqualification on the grounds that the employee would always be subject to blackmail. Charges of homosexuality had removed more than 500 State Department employees before him, and McLeod promised to replace them with "red-blooded men of initiative". He developed standards for assessing homosexuality that disregarded activity before the age of 18 but included all same-sex contact, and he hoped to make it "a standard for Government-wide application."

According to the New York Times, he had good relations with the press and "[e]ven in his most controversial days, he would joke, with a puzzled air, about what he called his reputation as a 'beast'." In an August 1953 speech, he described his workload of 4,000 cases of personnel hired by the Truman administration, 2,000 never investigated and 2,000 inadequately investigated. He said his efforts were no "witch hunt" but an attempt "to eliminate from public service any person upon whom the investigation raises a reasonable doubt as to his security potential." Unlike in the previous administrations of Roosevelt and Truman, he said, "we are resolving doubt in favor of the Government." C.L. Sulzberger, in an article lamenting how diplomats were being misjudged and mistreated in the application of security standards, described a conversation with McLeod:

Not long ago I had an interesting talk with Scott McLeod, the much-debated young man who, after a career in the F.B.I., became boss of State Department security. Mr. McLeod is engaging and forthright. He sincerely believes that "security" is a basic criterion of diplomacy. Discussing the Department's current program, McLeod refers frankly to the days when he used to investigate applicants for jobs in the F.B.I. After checking all other qualifications of a candidate he used to think, says he: "How would I like him to be behind a tree with me in a gunfight? You get pretty high standards if you think along such lines. And that's the way I like to think in these investigations."

In 1955, McLeod told a surprised Senator Hubert Humphrey that his view of a security risk was not absolute: "It is our policy that we will not be so secure that we will not get our work done. If we sometimes have to hire a security risk to get a job done, we're going to get the job done." His example was someone with valuable language skills. He told a Senate committee that in 1954 his department had investigated 3885 hires for permanent positions and terminated only 3.

During his years at the State Department he filled a number of special assignments. He chaired a meeting of the Intergovernmental Committee for European Migration in February 1956 and headed the U.S. delegation to the same group in April 1957.

== Ireland ==
During the backlash against McCarthyism in the late 1950s, several Washington figures called for McLeod to be fired. President Dwight Eisenhower appointed McLeod Ambassador to Ireland, which provoked resentment because it was considered an especially attractive posting normally used to reward an experienced career diplomat. The Senate approved his appointment after "angry debate". The New York Times opposed his nomination because "no one man has represented in the public mind more than Scott McLeod all the evils of McCarthyism as applied to diplomacy." It called him "a well-intentioned if woefully misguided young man". On April 11, 1957, he responded that "morale of the United States Foreign Service has never been as high as it is today" and cited increased applications for jobs at the State Department. Opinion in Ireland was divided. Dulles endorsed the nomination and reviewed McLeod's record when asked if he had ever considered firing him from his State Department post:

[T]here was a point at the very first days of our Administration when we did not always see eye-to-eye about everything, but those days have passed; and I really think that he has done an extremely able job on important matters upon which he has been engaged–the Refugee Act, for example, and things of that sort–and ... that I have gained very great confidence in his ability and judgment, his human understanding.

The Senate confirmed his appointment on May 9 on a 60–20 vote, with only Democrats in opposition including then Senator John F. Kennedy. McLeod presented his credentials as ambassador on July 17, 1957, and served until March 15, 1961. President Kennedy accepted his resignation on February 6, 1961.

== Personal life ==
McLeod wrote an introduction to Martin A. Bursten's Escape from Fear, a study of the refugee problem following the Hungarian Revolution of 1956.

McLeod married Edna Van Pappelendam in 1939, and they had three children; the family lived in Bethesda, Maryland, and later in Sutton, New Hampshire. He died of a heart attack in Concord, New Hampshire, on November 7, 1961, at the age of 47.

Government offices
Preceded by New Office	Assistant Secretary of State for Security and Consular Affairs; March 3, 1953 – March 9, 1957	Succeeded by Roderic L. O'Connor
Diplomatic posts
Preceded by William Howard Taft III	United States Ambassador to Ireland; July 17, 1957 – March 15, 1961	Succeeded by Edward G. Stockdale
