= Assistant Secretary of State for Consular Affairs =

U.S. government position

United States Assistant Secretary of State for Consular Affairs
- Seal of the United States Department of State

- Flag of an assistant secretary of state

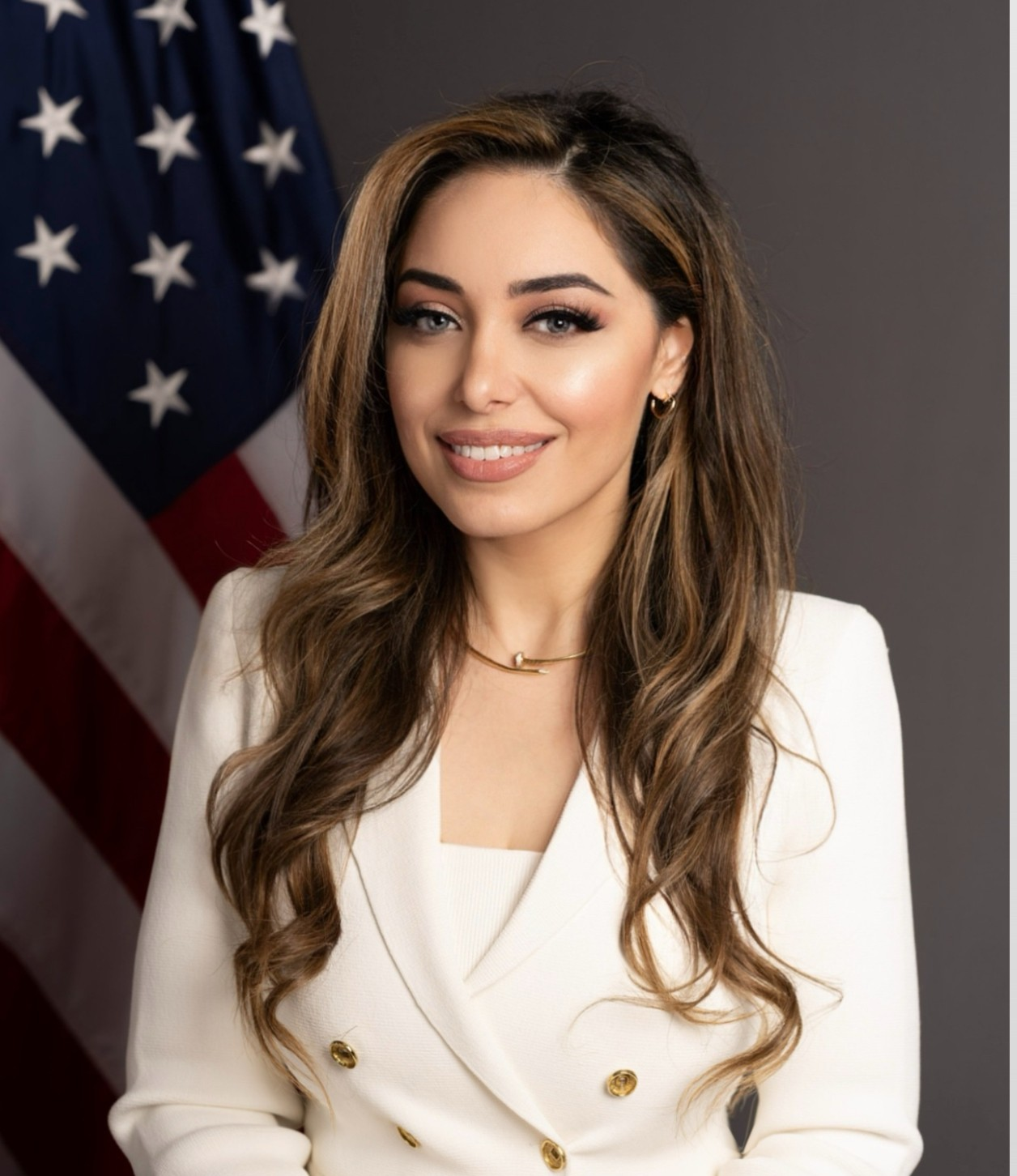
- Incumbent; Mora Namdar since December 22, 2025
- Reports to: The under secretary of state for management
- Nominator: The president of the United States
- Inaugural holder: R. W. Scott McLeod
- Formation: 1953
- Website: Official web

The assistant secretary of state for consular affairs is the head of the Bureau of Consular Affairs within the United States Department of State. The assistant secretary of state for consular affairs reports to the under secretary of state for management. From 1953 to 1977, the position was called Administrator of the Bureau of Security and Consular Affairs. The bureau is "responsible for the welfare and protection of U.S. citizens abroad, for the issuance of passports and other documentation to citizens and nationals, and for the protection of U.S. border security and the facilitation of legitimate travel to the United States" as described by the bureau's website.

== List of the assistant secretaries of state ==
=== Security and consular affairs, 1953–77 ===
#	Name	Assumed office	Left office	President(s) served under
1	R. W. Scott McLeod	March 3, 1953	March 9, 1957	Dwight D. Eisenhower
2	Roderic L. O'Connor	May 28, 1957	December 29, 1958	Dwight D. Eisenhower
3	John W. Hanes III	January 1, 1959	October 4, 1962	Dwight D. Eisenhower and John F. Kennedy
4	Abba P. Schwartz	October 5, 1962	March 6, 1966	John F. Kennedy and Lyndon B. Johnson
5	Barbara M. Watson	August 12, 1968	December 31, 1974	Lyndon B. Johnson and Richard Nixon
6	Leonard F. Walentynowicz	January 2, 1975	March 7, 1977	Gerald Ford

=== Consular affairs, 1977–present ===
#	Name	Assumed office	Left office	President(s) served under
7	Barbara M. Watson	April 13, 1977	August 17, 1980	Jimmy Carter
8	Diego C. Asencio	August 29, 1980	November 21, 1983	Jimmy Carter and Ronald Reagan
9	Joan M. Clark	December 22, 1983	October 18, 1989	Ronald Reagan
10	Elizabeth M. Tamposi	October 18, 1989	November 10, 1992	George H. W. Bush
11	Mary A. Ryan	May 12, 1993	September 30, 2002	Bill Clinton and George W. Bush
12	Maura Harty	November 20, 2002	February 29, 2008	George W. Bush
13	Janice L. Jacobs	June 10, 2008	April 4, 2014	George W. Bush and Barack Obama
14	Michele Thoren Bond	April 4, 2014	January 26, 2017	Barack Obama and Donald Trump
-	David T. Donahue (acting)	January 26, 2017	August 11, 2017	Donald Trump
15	Carl Risch	August 11, 2017	December 22, 2020	Donald Trump
-	Mora Namdar (acting)	December 22, 2020	January 20, 2021	Donald Trump
-	Ian G. Brownlee (acting)	January 20, 2021	August 12, 2021	Joe Biden
16	Rena Bitter	August 12, 2021	January 20, 2025	Joe Biden
-	Julie Stufft (acting)	January 20, 2025	February 27, 2025	Donald Trump
-	John Armstrong (acting)	February 27, 2025	December 22, 2025	Donald Trump
17	Mora Namdar	December 22, 2025	Present	Donald Trump
