= Grover Cleveland High School (Buffalo, New York) =

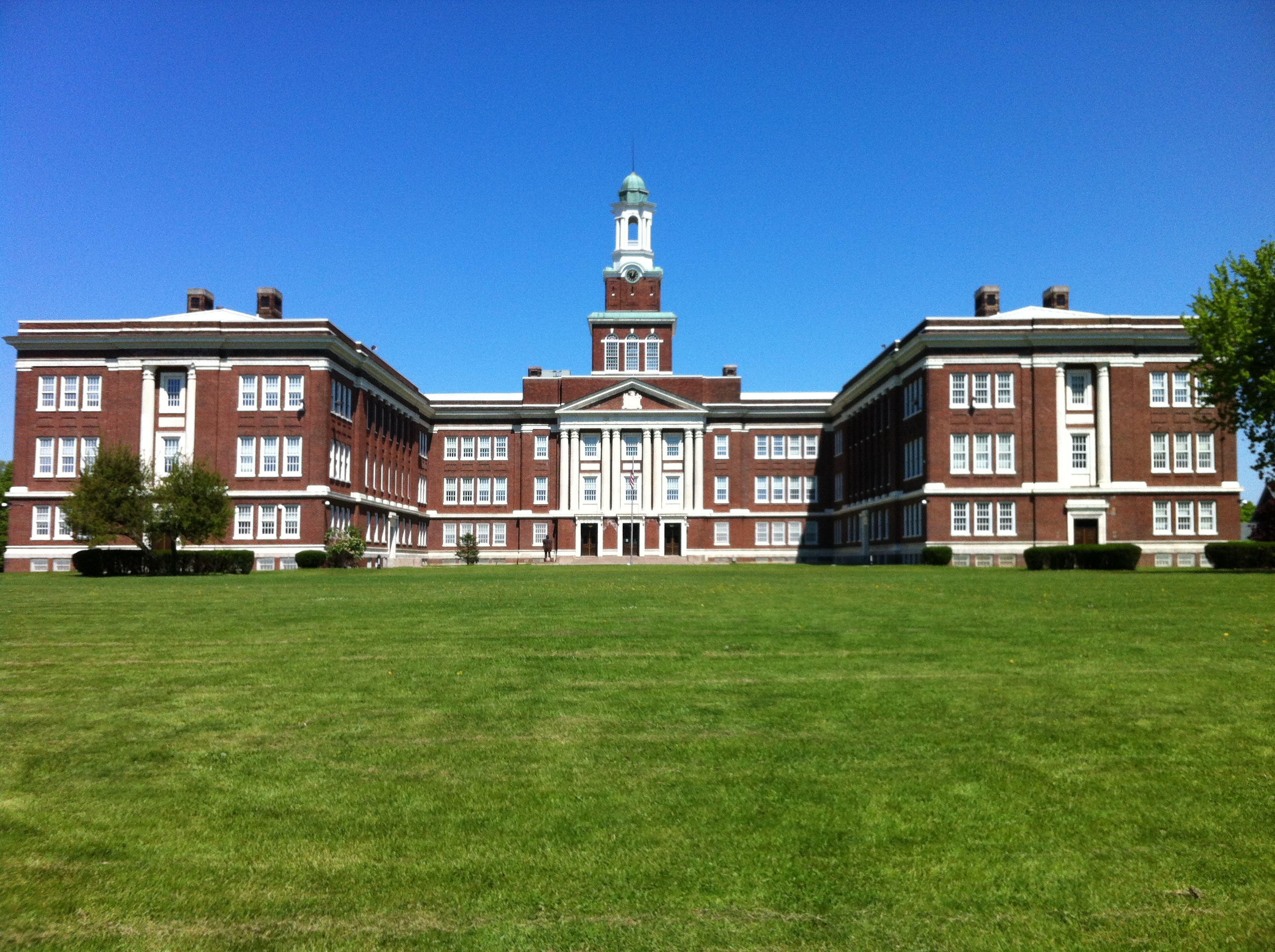
- Grover Cleveland High School

Location
- 110 Fourteenth Street; Lower West Side; Buffalo, Erie County, New York 14213; United States

Information
- Type: Public, Coeducational
- Established: 1931
- Closed: 2011
- School district: Buffalo Public Schools
- School number: 202
- Grades: 9-12
- Campus type: Urban
- Colors: Green and White
- Mascot: Presidents
- Yearbook: The Clevelander

Grover Cleveland High School was a high school located in Buffalo, New York. It is named for former U.S. president and Buffalo mayor Grover Cleveland and generally housed students from Grades 9 - 12, teaching according to the Board of Regents. Currently, the school building houses The International Preparatory School.

== History ==
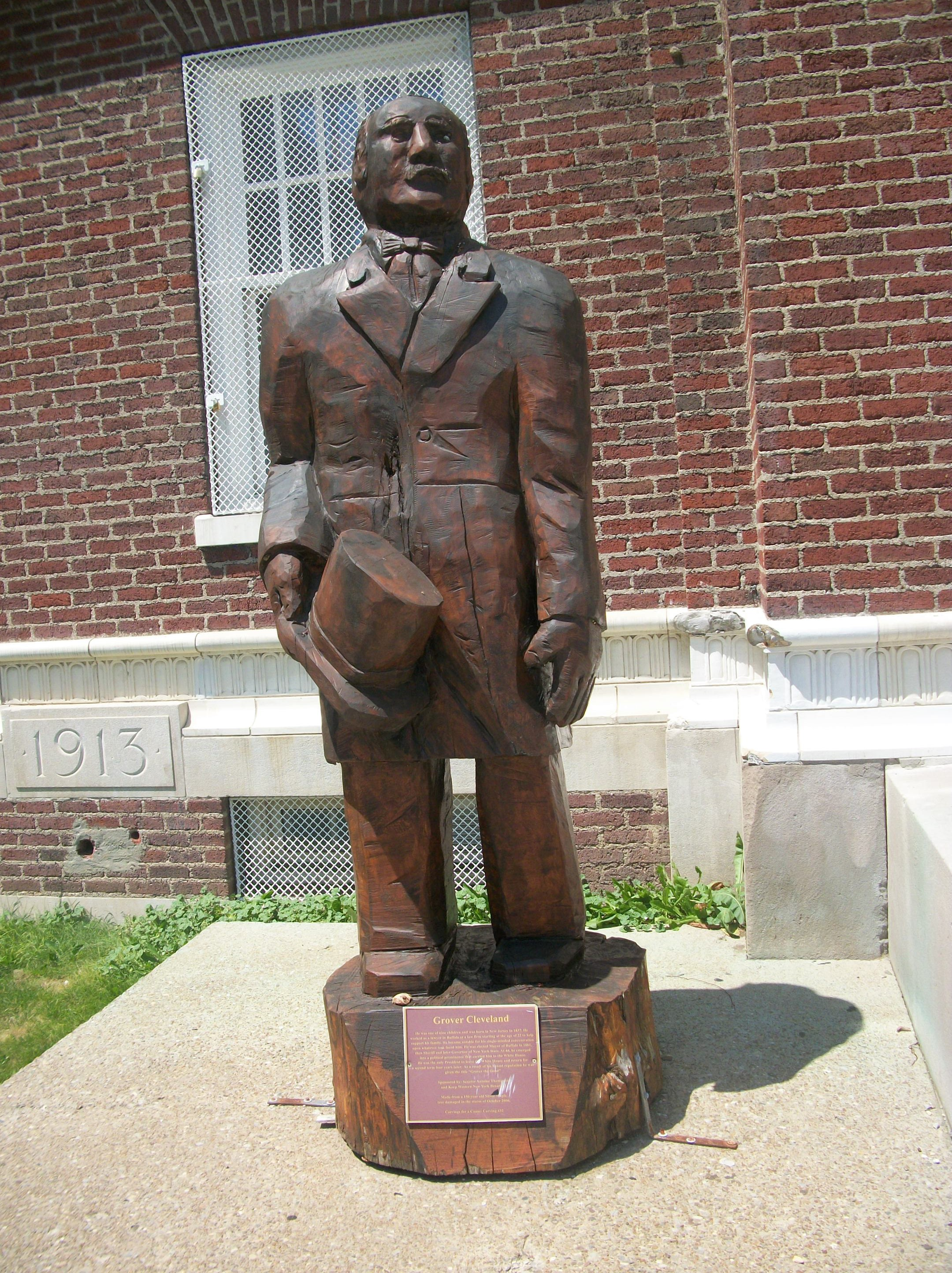
Statue of Grover Cleveland in front of the school, unveiled in 2008.

Grover Cleveland High School was originally constructed in 1913 as the home to Buffalo State University, then known as Buffalo Teacher's School. In 1931, Grover Cleveland High School was formed as a school serving the Lower West Side of Buffalo. The building was renovated in 1959, where an addition was built onto the northern end of the school that contained classrooms, a swimming pool, and a new gymnasium. During the 1970s, Grover was designated as the school to serve foreign language-speaking students within the City of Buffalo. In 2007, the building began housing two schools, Grover Cleveland High School, and the International Preparatory School, a math and science magnet affiliated with the College Board. In 2010, Grover Cleveland High School was closed to new due to low graduation rates and increasing incidents of student violence and possession of weapons. The final class of seniors graduated in 2011.

From 2011 until June 2013, the building was renovated and re-opened to students at International Preparatory School and the new STAR Academy in Fall 2013.

=== Former principals ===
Previous assignment and reasons for departure listed in parentheses

- Charles A. Kennedy–1931-1951 (Vice Principal - East High School, retired)
- John F. Devine–1951-1962 (Vice Principal - Grover Cleveland High School, died)
- Martin B. O'Donnell–1962-1967, 1968-1970 (Assistant Principal - Lafayette High School, named Principal of Hutchinson Central Technical High School)
- John A. Demerly [interim]–1967-1968 (Assistant Principal - Grover Cleveland High School, returned to position)
- Daniel M. Kublitz [interim]–1970-1971 (Assistant Principal - Grover Cleveland High School, named Assistant Principal of Bennett High School)
- Ronald J. Meer–1971-1975 (Vice Principal - Woodlawn Junior High School, named Principal of Bennett High School)
- John E. Ward–1975-1979 (Principal - Genesee-Humboldt Junior High School, retired)
- Rocco A. Lamparelli–1979-1985 (Supervising Principal - South Buffalo Public Schools, named Acting Assistant Superintendent of Secondary Education for Buffalo Public Schools)
- John H. Davis–1985-1989 (Assistant Principal - Bennett High School, retired)
- Benjamin L. Randle, Jr.–1989-2004 (Principal - Buffalo Alternative High School, retired)
- Kevin J. Eberle–2004-2007 (Principal - West Seneca West Senior High School, named Principal of the International Preparatory School at Grover)
- Casey M. Young Welch–2007-2010 (Acting Principal - Harriet Ross Tubman School, named Principal of Academy School 131 @ 44)

=== Selected former administrators ===
Year	Superintendent	Principal
1931-1932	Ernest Hartwell	Charlie Kennedy
1932-1933	Ernest Hartwell	Charlie Kennedy
1933-1934	Ernest Hartwell	Charlie Kennedy
1934-1935	Ernest Hartwell	Charlie Kennedy
1935-1936	Robert Pabst	Charlie Kennedy
1936-1937	Robert Pabst	Charlie Kennedy
1937-1938	Robert Pabst	Charlie Kennedy
1938-1939	Robert Pabst	Charlie Kennedy
1939-1940	Robert Pabst	Charlie Kennedy
1940-1941	Robert Pabst	Charlie Kennedy
1941-1942	Robert Pabst	Charlie Kennedy
1942-1943	Robert Pabst	Charlie Kennedy
1943-1944	Robert Pabst	Charlie Kennedy
1944-1945	Robert Pabst	Charlie Kennedy
1945-1946	Robert Pabst	Charlie Kennedy
1946-1947	Robert Pabst	Charlie Kennedy
1947-1948	Robert Pabst	Charlie Kennedy
1948-1949	Robert Pabst	Charlie Kennedy
1949-1950	Robert Pabst	Charlie Kennedy
1950-1951	Ben Willis	Charlie Kennedy
1951-1952	Ben Willis	John Devine
1952-1953	Ben Willis	John Devine
1953-1954	Parmer Ewing	John Devine
1954-1955	Parmer Ewing	John Devine
1955-1956	Parmer Ewing	John Devine
1956-1957	Parmer Ewing	John Devine
1957-1958	Joseph Manch	John Devine
1958-1959	Joseph Manch	John Devine
1959-1960	Joseph Manch	John Devine
1960-1961	Joseph Manch	John Devine
1961-1962	Joseph Manch	John Devine
1962-1963	Joseph Manch	Marty O'Donnell
1963-1964	Joseph Manch	Marty O'Donnell
1964-1965	Joseph Manch	Marty O'Donnell
1965-1966	Joseph Manch	Marty O'Donnell
1966-1967	Joseph Manch	Marty O'Donnell
1967-1968	Joseph Manch	John Demerly*
1968-1969	Joseph Manch	Marty O'Donnell
1969-1970	Joseph Manch	Marty O'Donnell
1970-1971	Joseph Manch	Dan Kublitz*
1971-1972	Joseph Manch	Ron Meer*
1972-1973	Joseph Manch	Ron Meer
1973-1974	Joseph Manch	Ron Meer
1974-1975	Joseph Manch	Ron Meer
1975-1976	Gene Reville	John Ward
1976-1977	Gene Reville	John Ward
1977-1978	Gene Reville	John Ward
1978-1979	Gene Reville	John Ward
1979-1980	Gene Reville	Rocco Lamparelli
1980-1981	Gene Reville	Rocco Lamparelli
1981-1982	Gene Reville	Rocco Lamparelli
1982-1983	Gene Reville	Rocco Lamparelli
1983-1984	Gene Reville	Rocco Lamparelli
1984-1985	Gene Reville	Rocco Lamparelli
1985-1986	Gene Reville	John Davis
1986-1987	Gene Reville	John Davis
1987-1988	Gene Reville	John Davis
1988-1989	Gene Reville	John Davis
1989-1990	Albert Thompson*	Ben Randle
1990-1991	Albert Thompson	Ben Randle
1991-1992	Albert Thompson	Ben Randle
1992-1993	Albert Thompson	Ben Randle
1993-1994	Albert Thompson	Ben Randle
1994-1995	Albert Thompson	Ben Randle
1995-1996	Albert Thompson	Ben Randle
1996-1997	Jim Harris	Ben Randle
1997-1998	Jim Harris	Ben Randle
1998-1999	Jim Harris	Ben Randle
1999-2000	Jim Harris	Ben Randle
2000-2001	Marion Canedo	Ben Randle
2001-2002	Marion Canedo	Ben Randle
2002-2003	Marion Canedo	Ben Randle
2003-2004	Marion Canedo	Ben Randle
2004-2005	Yvonne Hargrave*	Kevin Eberle
2005-2006	James Williams	Kevin Eberle
2006-2007	James Williams	Kevin Eberle
2007-2008	James Williams	Casey Young
2008-2009	James Williams	Casey Young
2009-2010	James Williams	Casey Young
2010-2011	James Williams	Kevin Eberle

*Denotes interim appointment

== Notable alumni ==
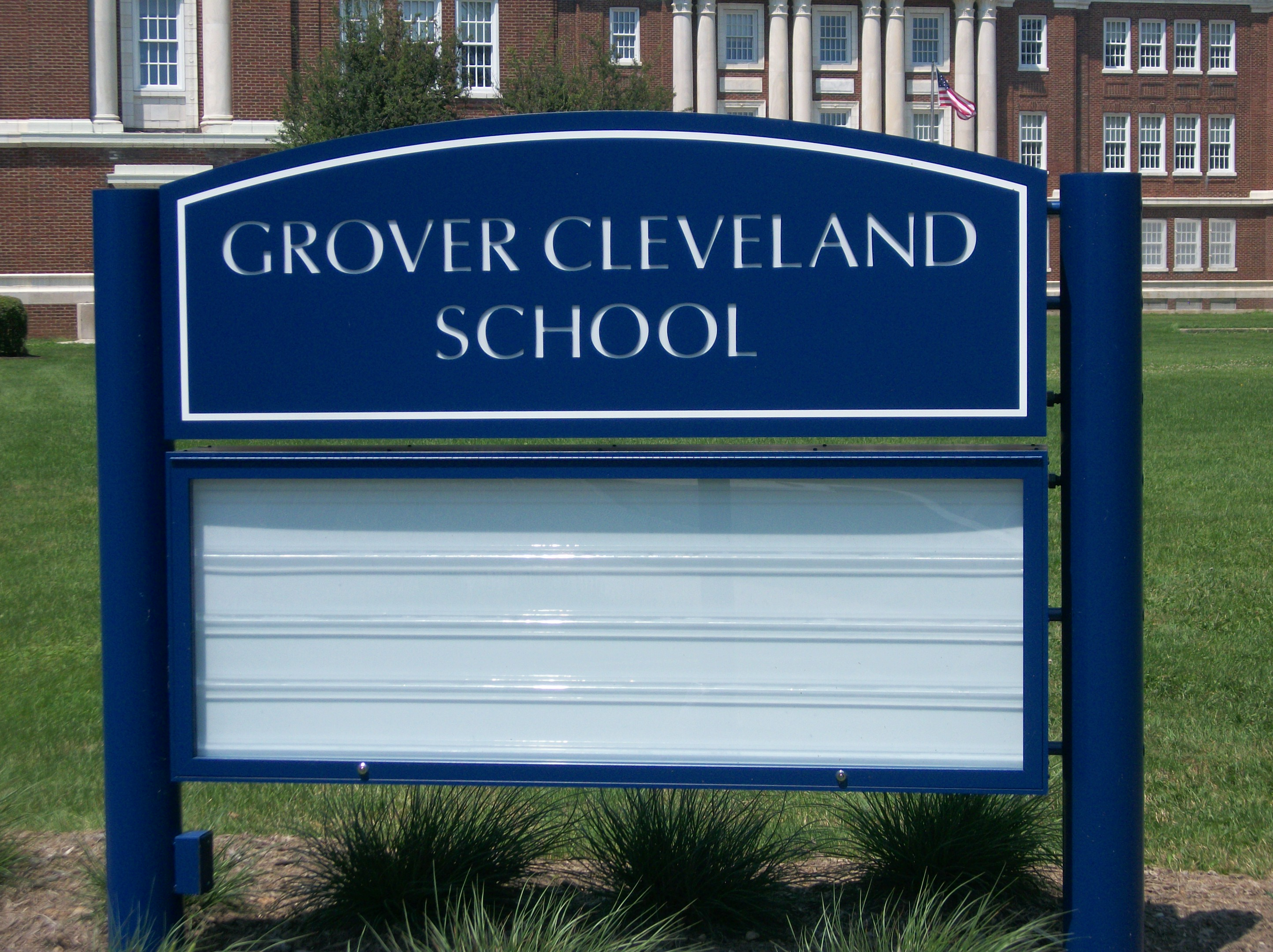

- Joel Giambra - Former Erie County, New York executive
- Altemio Sanchez - The Bike Path Rapist
- Steven Means - Defensive end in the National Football League
