= Mora Namdar =

American diplomat and lawyer

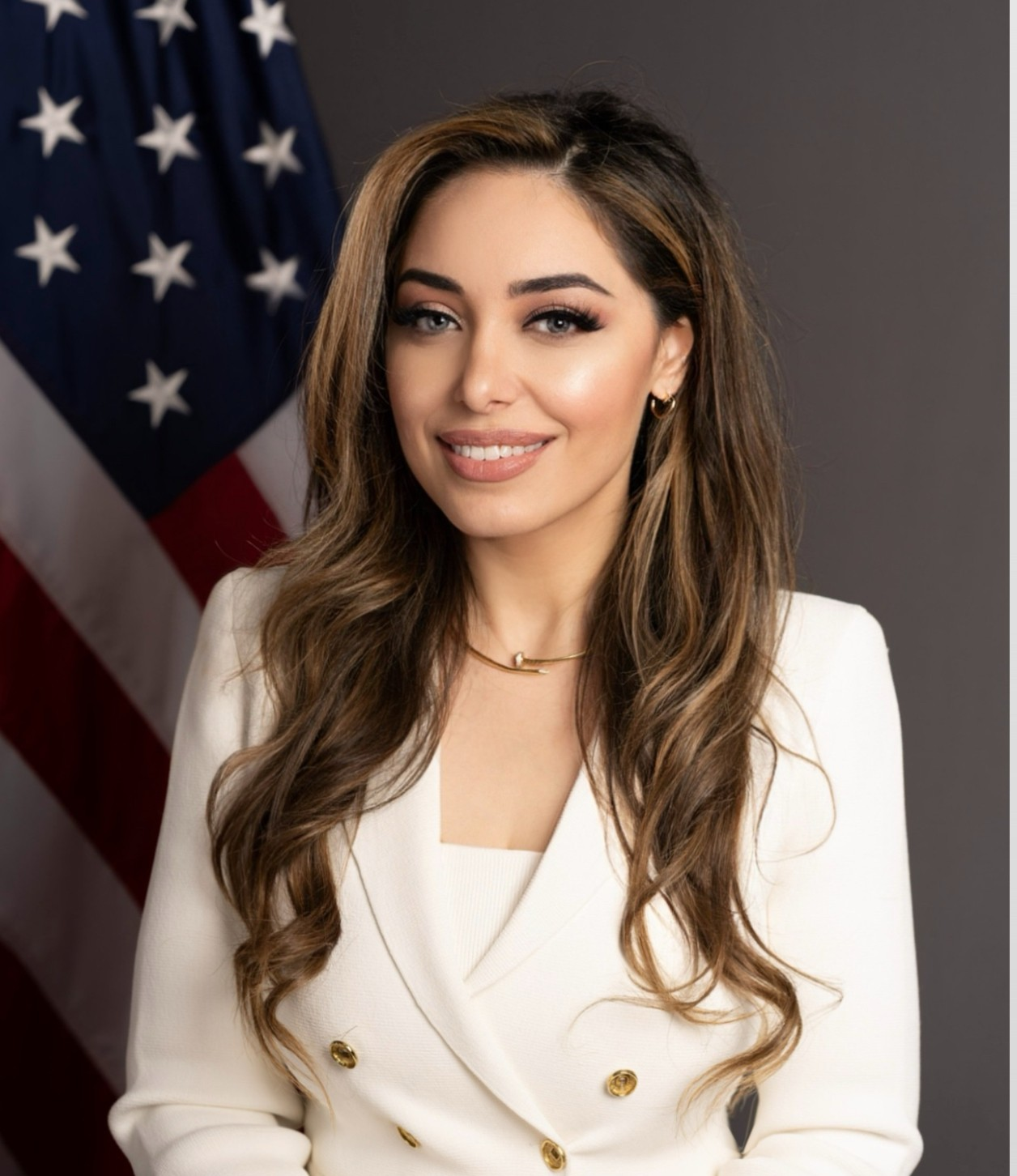

17th Assistant Secretary of State for Consular Affairs
- Incumbent
- Assumed office December 22, 2025
- President: Donald Trump
- Preceded by: Rena Bitter

Assistant Secretary of State for Near Eastern Affairs
- Acting
- In office May 19, 2025 – December 1, 2025
- President: Donald Trump
- Preceded by: Tim Lenderking (acting)
- Succeeded by: Robert Palladino (acting)

Personal details
- Born: Texas, United States
- Education: Southern Methodist University (BA); American University (MIA, JD); University of Oxford
- Occupation: Lawyer, diplomat
- Website: https://www.state.gov/biographies/mora-namdar

Mora Namdar (Persian: مورا نامدار) is an Iranian-American diplomat and attorney who serves as Assistant Secretary of State for Consular Affairs at the United States Department of State. She was appointed to the position in December 2025. She previously held other posts at the State Department, including senior bureau official of the Bureau of Near Eastern Affairs, which covers the Middle East and North Africa.

== Early life and education ==
Namdar was born in Texas to parents who had immigrated from Iran. At Southern Methodist University, she earned bachelor's degrees in political science and international affairs, with minors in fine art, philosophy and human rights. She then earned a master's degree in international affairs and a Juris Doctor from American University. At its Washington College of Law, she was the founding editor-in-chief of the National Security Law Brief. She also studied at the University of Oxford.

== Assistant Secretary of State for Consular Affairs ==
Namdar was appointed Assistant Secretary of State for Consular Affairs in December 2025. The consular affairs bureau is the State Department's largest, with more than 13,000 staff. It handles visas, passports and help for U.S. citizens abroad.
