= James S. Watson =

American judge

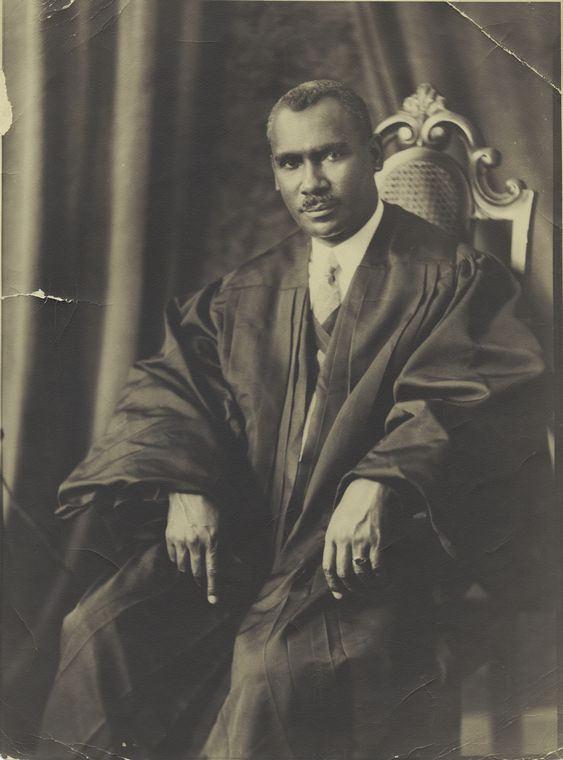
- Born: May 29, 1882
- Died: 1952 (aged 69–70)
- Education: City College of New York; New York Law School
- Occupation: Judge

James Samuel Watson (1882–1952) was one of the first two Black Americans elected as a judge in the state of New York.

== Biography ==
James S. Watson was born in Spanish Town, Jamaica on May 29, 1882. His father, James Michael Watson, was a Sergeant in the Jamaica Constabulary Force and would later work for the Jamaica Government Railway as a conductor and platform foreman. His mother's name was Elizabeth Jones Watson. After attending elementary school in Spanish Town, James S. Watson worked as a bookkeeper, cashier, and then chief clerk at a hotel in Constant Spring, Jamaica.

In June 1905, Watson moved to New York City. There he attended evening high school in Harlem, and graduated from high school in 1910. In 1908, he had begun working for the law firm of House, Grossman and Vorhaus, located at 115 Broadway, as a clerk. From 1910 to 1913, Watson took night classes at both the City College of New York and New York Law School, from which he received an LL.B. in 1913. He became a United States citizen on July 3, 1913. He was admitted to the bar of New York in April 1914 and the next month was admitted to practice before the United States District Court for the Southern District of New York. Watson remained at House, Grossman and Vorhaus, now as a lawyer until 1920, becoming head of their Department of Corporate and Tax Law.

In 1920, Watson and two other black attorneys, S. T. Christian and J. E. Stevens founded their own law firm, where he would practice law until 1930. In 1922, he became Special Assistant Corporation Counsel to New York City in the Special Franchise Tax Division. He also represented Marcus Garvey during the 1920s.

Watson ran for municipal judge in 1930 and, together with Charles E. Toney, also elected that year, thus became one of the first two black judges in New York state. He served as a judge until his retirement in 1950. He faced a particularly tough re-election campaign in 1940 when Tammany Hall denied Watson the position of Democratic nominee in spite of Watson's being endorsed by the Association of the Bar of the City of New York. Tammany Hall eventually relented and Watson was given the nomination and won re-election by a margin of nine-to-one. In 1943, Watson was the first African American to become a new member of the American Bar Association since 1912.

Watson retired from the bench in 1950, becoming president of the Municipal Civil Service Commission. He held this position until his death in 1952. His funeral was attended by over 3,000 people, including nearly every high ranking city official. Vincent R. Impellitteri, the Mayor of New York City, was one of the pallbearers at his funeral.

== Family ==
Watson married a fellow Jamaican American, Violet Lopez, at New Haven, Connecticut in 1917. Along with Mary McLeod, Violet Lopez Watson was one of the founders of the National Council of Negro Women.

James and Violet Watson had four children, including:

- Barbara M. Watson (1918–1983), who was the first African American Assistant Secretary of State and who served as United States Ambassador to Malaysia
- James Lopez Watson (1922–2001), who became a judge of the United States Court of International Trade
- Douglas C. Watson (d. 1993), a design engineer who helped design the Republic F-105 Thunderchief and the Republic F-84 Thunderjet
- Grace Elizabeth Watson (b. 1924)-Served in the Department of Health Education and Welfare

James and Violet Watson also had several nieces and nephews, including:

- J. Bruce Llewellyn (1927–2010), a prominent businessman
- Colin Powell (b. 1937), the first African American to become United States Secretary of State

== See also ==
- List of first minority male lawyers and judges in New York
