= Leonard F. Walentynowicz =

American lawyer (1932–2005)

6th Assistant Secretary of State for Security and Consular Affairs
- In office January 2, 1975 – March 7, 1977
- Preceded by: Barbara M. Watson
- Succeeded by: Barbara M. Watson

Personal details
- Born: 1932 Buffalo, New York
- Died: 2005 (aged 72–73)
- Education: University at Buffalo

Leonard Frederick Walentynowicz (1932–2005) was United States Assistant Secretary of State for Security and Consular Affairs from 1975 to 1977; a Republican lawyer and the long-time executive director of the Polish American Congress.

== Biography ==
Walentynowicz was born in Buffalo, New York, in 1932. He grew up on the East Side of Buffalo and attended high school at Hutchinson Central Technical High School and then attended the University at Buffalo, The State University of New York, receiving a degree in business, and the University at Buffalo Law School, receiving his law degree in 1955.

After law school, Walentynowicz established a law practice in Buffalo. He later became Chief of the Appeals Section of the Erie County district attorney's office. He also served as a special prosecutor for the Bar Association of Erie County. In 1962, he was elected president of the University at Buffalo Law Alumni Association, and served as one of the first instructors at the law school's Trial Techniques clinical.

In early 1974, President of the United States Richard Nixon nominated Walentynowicz as Assistant Secretary of State for Security and Consular Affairs to replace Barbara M. Watson. This nomination proved controversial because Watson was the only African American and the only woman serving as an Assistant Secretary of State in the United States Department of State; in April 1974, the National Association for the Advancement of Colored People passed a resolution condemning Nixon's decision to replace a black woman with a white, male Republican. As a result of this opposition, Senators Jacob K. Javits (R—NY) and James L. Buckley (C—NY) initially blocked Walentynowicz's appointment. President Gerald Ford later succeeded in getting Walentynowicz confirmed as Assistant Secretary of State for Consular Affairs and Walentynowicz held this office from January 2, 1975, until March 7, 1977.

After his time in office, Walentynowicz remained in Washington, D.C., becoming Executive Director of the Polish American Congress. In this capacity, he authored several amicus briefs for cases pending at the Supreme Court of the United States, generally opposing affirmative action as a form of reverse racism that mainly hurt white ethnics such as Polish Americans. For example, he filed an amicus brief on behalf of the Polish American Congress and several other ethnic organizations in the landmark case of Regents of the University of California v. Bakke, 438 U.S. 265 (1978), which upheld affirmative action. He testified several times before the United States Commission on Civil Rights and in 1980, he published a book about workplace discrimination against European Americans entitled Employment and Ethnicity.

In the late 1980s, Walentynowicz moved back to Buffalo, settling in Grand Island, New York, and continuing to practice law. He also taught at the UB Law School, the Buffalo Police Academy, and the Erie County Sheriff's Academy.

Walentynowicz died on July 7, 2005, at the age of 72.

Government offices
Preceded by Barbara M. Watson	Assistant Secretary of State for Security and Consular Affairs; January 2, 1975 – March 7, 1977	Succeeded by Barbara M. Watson
