= Barbara M. Watson =

American diplomat

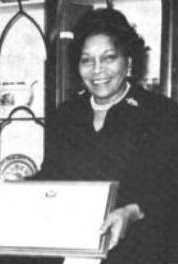
- Barbara M. Watson, receiving an award, from a 1975 publication of the U.S. State Department.

5th Assistant Secretary of State for Security and Consular Affairs
- In office August 12, 1968 – December 31, 1974
- Preceded by: Abba P. Schwartz
- Succeeded by: Leonard F. Walentynowicz

7th Assistant Secretary of State for Consular Affairs
- In office April 13, 1977 – August 17, 1980
- Preceded by: Leonard F. Walentynowicz
- Succeeded by: Diego C. Asencio

7th United States Ambassador to Malaysia
- In office September 25, 1980 – March 1, 1981
- President: Jimmy Carter
- Preceded by: Robert Hopkins Miller
- Succeeded by: Ronald D. Palmer

Personal details
- Born: November 5, 1918 New York City, New York, U.S.
- Died: February 18, 1983 (aged 64) Washington, D.C., U.S.
- Relations: James Lopez Watson (brother); J. Bruce Llewellyn (cousin); Colin Powell (cousin)
- Parent(s): James S. Watson, Violet Lopez Watson
- Education: Barnard College

Barbara Mae Watson (November 5, 1918 – February 18, 1983) was a lawyer, United States diplomat, the seventh Ambassador to Malaysia, and the first Black person and the first woman to serve as an Assistant Secretary of State.

== Early life and education ==
Watson was born in New York City, the eldest child of James S. Watson and his wife, Violet Lopez Watson. Her parents were born in Jamaica; her father was the first Black judge elected in New York State, and her mother was one of the founders of the National Council of Negro Women. Barbara M. Watson was the sister of judge James Lopez Watson, Grace Elizabeth Watson, and Douglas C. Watson. Her cousins included J. Bruce Llewellyn and of Colin Powell.

Watson attended Barnard College, completing a bachelor's degree in 1939. While at Barnard, she was the first Black woman to participate in the school's Greek Games. She attended New York Law School and earned her law degree in 1962, graduating third in her class.

== Career ==
=== Early career ===
After college, Watson worked as an interviewer for the United Seamen's Service from 1943 to 1946. In 1946, Watson, along with Jamaican commercial artist Edward Brandford and stylist Mary Yarbo, co-founded one of the first licensed Black modeling agencies, Brandford Models. Watson taught etiquette and charm school courses at the agency's affiliated modeling school. Edward Brandford founded an advertising agency, Brandford Advertising, that was marketed towards companies that wished to appeal to Black consumers in 1948. Watson ran the modeling agency after 1949, when Brandford's attention had become more divided. She had renamed the agency Barbara Watson Models by 1954, and continued to serve as Director until 1956, when she closed both the agency and its affiliated modeling school.

From 1958 to 1959, Watson worked as Student Activities coordinator at Hampton Institute. After obtaining her law degree, she was appointed as an assistant attorney in the New York City Law Department in 1963. She then worked as executive director of the New York City Commission to the United Nations from 1964 until 1966.

=== Department of State under Presidents Johnson, Nixon, and Ford ===
Watson joined the United States Department of State in 1966, as a special assistant to the Deputy Under Secretary of State for Administration and was soon promoted to Deputy Assistant Secretary of State for Security and Consular Affairs. From 1966 to 1968, she served as Acting Assistant Secretary of State for Security and Consular Affairs. She was responsible for the Passport Office, the Visa Office, and the Office of Special Consular Services.

In July 1968, President Lyndon Johnson nominated Watson as Assistant Secretary of State for Security and Consular Affairs. After Senate confirmation, she held this office from August 12, 1968, until November 1974. She was both the first black Assistant Secretary of State and the first woman to serve in this post. In 1974, she received the Luther I. Replogle Award for Management Improvement. She also chaired an international consular conference in Mexico City in 1974.

==== Ouster ====
Beginning in March 1974, the Nixon administration attempted multiple times to oust Watson in order to replace her with Leonard F. Walentynowicz, a Republican lawyer from Buffalo, New York. The Ford administration blocked attempts from Nixon appointees in late August and early September before demanding her resignation in November. Watson remained in Washington, D.C., where she took a job with Walter Annenberg's Triangle Publications as a legal consultant in 1975. She also lectured at several colleges and universities during this interim.

=== Department of State under President Carter ===
In January 1977, President Jimmy Carter asked Watson to return to the State Department as Assistant Secretary of State for Consular Affairs; her second stint in this office lasted from April 13, 1977, until August 17, 1980. Three years later, President Carter appointed Watson United States Ambassador to Malaysia. She presented her credentials on September 25, 1980. President Ronald Reagan accepted her letter of resignation in February 1981 and Watson resigned on March 1, 1981. She returned to private law practice with two Washington-based firms, specializing in international law, business development, and trade. Watson was a Democrat.

== Personal life and legacy ==
Watson received honorary doctorates from the University of Maryland and Mount St. Mary's College. She was a member of the American Bar Association, the District of Columbia Bar Association, the Bar of the State of New York, and the Bar of the District of Columbia. In addition to receiving the Luther I. Replogle Award for Outstanding Management in Foreign Affairs in 1974, Watson was the recipient of seventeen other awards from varied organizations, and was decorated as a Commander of the National Order of the Republic of the Ivory Coast.

Watson was a member of the boards of Fordham University; Barnard College; the Georgetown University School of Foreign Service; the Georgetown Center for Strategic and International Studies; Radio Liberty/Radio Free Europe; and the Wolf Trap Foundation for the Performing Arts.

Barbara Mae Watson died of pneumonia at George Washington Hospital in Washington, D.C. on February 18, 1983, aged 64 years. Her papers and photographs are in the Schomburg Center for Research in Black Culture, at the New York Public Library. In 1994, the Consular Officer of the Year Award was renamed the Barbara M. Watson Award for Consular Excellence, in her memory.

Government offices
Preceded by Abba P. Schwartz	Assistant Secretary of State for Security and Consular Affairs; August 12, 1968 – December 31, 1974	Succeeded by Leonard F. Walentynowicz
Preceded by Leonard F. Walentynowicz	Assistant Secretary of State for Consular Affairs; April 13, 1977 – August 17, 1980	Succeeded by Diego C. Asencio
Diplomatic posts
Preceded by Robert Hopkins Miller	United States Ambassador to Malaysia; September 25, 1980 – March 1, 1981	Succeeded by Ronald D. Palmer
