= Buffalo Public Schools =

School system in Buffalo, New York

Address
- 712 City Hall Buffalo, New York, 14202; United States
- Coordinates: 42°53′11.73″N 78°52′45.49″W

District information
- Type: Public
- Grades: Pre-K-12 and Adult education
- Established: 1838; 188 years ago
- Superintendent: Dr. Ebony Bullock (Interim)
- Schools: Elementary:45 High School:18 Adult Ed:2
- Budget: $1.9 billion (2025-2026)
- NCES District ID: 3605850

Students and staff
- Students: 33,299 (2019–2020)
- Teachers: 3,254.41 (FTE)
- Student–teacher ratio: 10.23

Other information
- Website: buffaloschools.org

Buffalo Public Schools serves approximately 31,000 students in Buffalo, New York, It is located in Erie County of western New York and operates nearly 70 facilities.

== History ==
The Buffalo Public School System was started in 1838, 13 years after the completion of the Erie Canal and only 6 years after the 1832 incorporation of the City of Buffalo. Buffalo was the first city in the state of New York to have a free public education system supported by local taxes. Although New York City had a free public education system prior to 1838, NYC obtained additional funding through private donations and sources. Buffalo Public Schools' first Superintendent of Schools, Oliver Gray Steele (1805–1879), was a prominent and successful businessman. Originally from Connecticut, Steele relocated to Buffalo in 1827. He held three different terms as Superintendent between 1838 and 1852, during which twelve new elementary facilities were built, bringing the total to 15 elementary buildings. A building for a dedicated high school was also purchased during this time. Steele is credited as being the "Father of the Public Schools of Buffalo" as his reorganization of the schools in Buffalo enabled children to have access to a free public education. Over 35 people have held the position of Superintendent of Buffalo Public Schools since that time.

Between 1870 and 1900, the population of Buffalo more than doubled. The school population grew along with it, straining existing facilities. Around this time, the city embarked on a campaign of expansion, constructing four public high schools in the first decades of the twentieth century. Additionally, several primary schools were designed by the architectural firm of Louise Bethune, the first woman to be a professional architect in the United States.

On April 26, 2025, Richard Hy, a detective with the Buffalo Police Department, claimed on the Unsubscribe podcast that the Buffalo Public Schools district covered up and refused to work with law enforcement with cases of sexual assaults and abuse. Hy also stated that Buffalo Public Schools officials and attorneys obstructed evidence and ignored subpoenas and court orders to cover up child abuse and sexual abuse within the district. Hy also stated that the Erie County District Attorney's office and his superiors were also frustrated to which they replied no comment with concerns about compromising ongoing investigations. In May 2025, Richard Hy again made additional allegations of misconduct. Representatives of Buffalo Public Schools and the Buffalo Teachers Federation have disputed Hy's claims. In late May 2025, Missouri-based lawyer Kayla Ferrel Onder was retained by 12 clients to who claimed they had been abused by BPS to file a legal complaint. In June, the School Board selected Rupp Pfalzgraf LLC to conduct an independent investigation into the allegations.

In February 2026, BPS reached a settlement with the New York Attorney General's Office to overhaul disciplinary procedures after an investigation found that the district disproportionally took action against students of color, students with disabilities, and students with English difficulties. Rupp Pfalzgraff released their report that same month, containing several redactions with purpose of maintaining student privacy. The report stated that while the investigators did not find evidence of coverups or obstruction, they did find "systemic challenges requiring attention, including communication protocols, evidence-preservation procedures, training, and coordination between schools and law enforcement and related entities." The report was criticized by parents for lacking new information. At the school board meeting following the release of the report, the report was not a topic on the agenda, though the district stated that changes were being made but would likely not be discussed publicly to maintain school safety and protocols. In April, the district sought feedback on a new district-wide safety plan.

== Administration ==
The Board of Education of the Buffalo City School District is the policy-making body for the Buffalo Public Schools, as provided by the Constitution of New York, and is under the general supervision of the New York State Education Department. The board consists of nine members elected by popular vote of District residents.

== Schools ==
=== Elementary schools ===
Except where noted, all schools serve Grades PreK-8

- D'Youville Porter Campus School, Front Park
- Buffalo Elementary School of Technology, Willert Park
- Early Childhood Center 17, Cold Springs
- Dr. Antonia Pantoja Community School of Academic Excellence, Front Park
- Native American Magnet School, Grant Ferry
- Hillery Park Elementary School, Seneca
- Frank A. Sedita Academy, Front Park
- Harriet Ross Tubman School, Emslie
- Bennett Park Montessori School, Willert Park
- Bilingual Center, First Ward
- Marva J. Daniel Futures Preparatory School, Medical Park
- Lovejoy Discovery School, Lovejoy
- International School, Grant Ferry
- School 48 @ MLK, Medical Park
- North Park Community School, North Park
- Community School, Kingsley
- Dr. George E. Blackman School of Excellence, #54, Parkside
- Dr. Charles R. Drew Science Magnet, MLK Park
- Annex 59, Polonia
- Arthur O. Eve School of Distinction, Leroy
- Frederick Law Olmsted School, Park Meadow
- Roosevelt Early Childhood Center, Riverside
- Discovery School, South Abbott
- Houghton Academy, Kaisertown
- Lorraine Elementary School, Abbott McKinley
- Hamlin Park Claude & Ouida Clapp Academy, Hamlin Park
- Herman Badillo Bilingual Academy, Columbus
- William J. Grabiarz School of Excellence, Military
- Highgate Heights School, Kensington
- School 81, North Park
- Early Childhood Center 82, Kenfield
- Health Care Center for Children, Grider
- Dr. Lydia T. Wright School of Excellence, Grider
- B.U.I.L.D. Community School, MLK Park
- Southside Elementary School, Seneca
- West Hertel Academy, Military
- Waterfront Elementary School, Columbus
- Harvey Austin School, Emerson
- Stanley Makowski Early Childhood Center, Kingsley

=== Secondary schools ===
Except where noted, all schools serve Grades 9-12

List of Secondary Schools
| P.S. | School name | Neighborhood | Principal | Description |
|---|---|---|---|---|
| 42 | Occupational Training Center | Downtown | Tom Vitale | Vocational training for students with disabilities until age 21 |
| 131 | The Academy School | Starin Central | Casey Young-Welch | Alternative education for suspended students (7-12) |
| 156 | Frederick Law Olmsted School | Kenfield | Charlie Durmaj | Gifted & talented middle/high school program (5-12) |
| 192 | Buffalo Academy for Visual and Performing Arts | Masten Park | Jody Covington | Magnet school for fine and performing students (5-12) |
| 195 | City Honors School | Medical Park | Bill Kresse | School for high-performing students with IB program and AP classes (5-12) |
| 196 | Math, Science, Technology Preparatory School | Medical Park | Beth Brown | Annex to PS 197 housed at School 48 (5-8) |
| 197 | Math, Science, Technology Preparatory School | Grider | Kevin Eberle | Health Information Technology and Medical Pathways programs (9-12) |
| 198 | The International Preparatory School | Front Park | Ella Dunne | West Side community school with CTE programs in business and architecture |
| 206 | South Park High School | Triangle | Michael Morris | South Buffalo community school with CTE programs in Solar Technology and Horticulture |
| 207 | Lafayette International High School | Forest | John Starkey | West Side community school with ENL programs for immigrant and refugee students |
| 208 | Riverside Academy | Riverside | Teena Jones | Riverside community school with CTE programs in aquaculture and tourism |
| 212 | Leonardo da Vinci High School | Front Park | Greg Lodinsky | Students take classes on campus from D'Youville College |
| 301 | Burgard Vocational High School | Leroy | Charlene Watson | CTE programs in Automotive/Machine Tool Technology and Welding in partnership with Alfred State College |
| 302 | Emerson School of Hospitality | Downtown | Debbie Stokes | Students learn hospitality/culinary skills with an on-site restaurant |
| 304 | Hutchinson Central Technical High School | Columbus | Gabriella Morquecho | Technology prep school with concentrations in Biochemistry and Engineering |
| 305 | McKinley Vocational High School | Black Rock | Carmelita Burgin [interim] | CTE programs in Aquatic ecology and applied trades (Carpentry, Electricity, HVAC, Printing and Plumbing) |
| 309 | East Community High School | MLK Park | Traci Cofield | CTE programs in Law Enforcement and Public Safety |
| 335 | Middle Early College High School | Starin Central | David Potter | Students take 5 years of high school via Erie Community College |
| 355 | Buffalo School of Culinary Arts & Hospitality Management | Downtown | Katie Schuta | Annex to Emerson School of Hospitality |
| 357 | Pathways Academy | MLK Park | Valarie Kent | Virtual and in-person alternative education for undercredited students |
| 363 | Lewis J. Bennett School of Innovative Technology | Starin Central | Carlos Alvarez | CTE programs in Computer Science and Programming |
| 366 | Research Laboratory High School | Starin Central | Angela Cullen | Bioinformatics/Life Science research |

=== Defunct schools ===
List of Defunct Schools
| P.S. | School name | Neighborhood | Low Grade | High Grade | Year closed | Building Status |
|---|---|---|---|---|---|---|
| 1 | School 1 | Lakeview | K | 8 | 1976 | Demolished |
| 2 | School 2 | Downtown | K | 8 | 1961 | Demolished |
| 4 | Harbor Heights Elementary School | First Ward | K | 8 | 2002 | Houses The Academy School |
| 5 | Seneca Street School | Larkinville | K | 8 | 1955 | Demolished |
| 7 | School 7 | Babcock | K | 8 | 1950 | Demolished |
| 8 | Follow Through Urban Learning Lab School | Masten Park | K | 8 | 2004 | Vacant |
| 9 | School 9 | Schiller Park | K | 8 | 1980 | Demolished |
| 10 | School 10 | Downtown | K | 8 | 1955 | Demolished |
| 11 | Poplar Academy | Schiller Park | K | 4 | 2009 | Buffalo Academy of Science Middle School |
| 12 | Harriet Ross Tubman Early Childhood Center | Willert Park | K | 4 | 2005 | House Office of Special Education |
| 13 | School 13 | Downtown | K | 12 | 2003 | Private Apartments/Office Space |
| 14 | School 14 | Downtown | K | 8 | 1930s | Demolished |
| 15 | School 15 | Downtown | K | 8 | 1965 | Demolished |
| 16 | School 16 | Bryant | K | 8 | 1976 | Private Apartments |
| 20 | School 20 | Black Rock | K | 8 | 1935 | Demolished |
| 21 | School 21 | North Park | K | 8 | 1980 | Demolished |
| 22 | School 22 | Central Park | K | 8 | 1980 | Private Apartments |
| 23 | School 23 | Genesee Moselle | K | 8 | 1980 | Demolished |
| 24 | School 24 | Broadway-Fillmore | K | 8 | 2002 | Redeveloped as apartments |
| 25 | School 25 | Babcock | K | 8 | 1949 | Demolished |
| 26 | School 26 | Babcock | K | 8 | 1982 | Demolished |
| 28 | Triangle Academy | Triangle | K | 8 | 1949 | Houses BPS' Center for Innovation, Technology and Training |
| 29 | School 29 | South Park | K | 8 | 1980 | Vacant |
| 30 | School 30 | Elmwood Village | K | 8 | 1976 | Demolished |
| 34 | School 34 | First Ward | K | 8 | 1976 | Demolished |
| 35 | School 35 | South Ellicott | K | 8 | 1933 | Demolished |
| 36 | Days Park Early Childhood Center | Allentown | PreK | 4 | 2009 | Houses Elmwood Village Charter School |
| 39 | Dr. Martin Luther King Jr. Multicultural Institute | Medical Park | PreK | 8 | 2016 | Houses School 48 and MST Prep Annex |
| 40 | School 40 | Babcock | PreK | 6 | 2006 | Houses Buffalo Academy of Science Elementary School |
| 41 | School 41 | Johnson | PreK | 8 | 1976 | Demolished |
| 42 | School 42 | Black Rock | PreK | 8 | 1979 | Community Center/Apartments |
| 44 | Lincoln Academy | Emerson | K | 8 | 2005 | Vacant |
| 47 | School 47 | Willert Park | PreK | 8 | 1978 | Demolished |
| 48 | School 48 | Masten Park | K | 8 | 1979 | Demolished |
| 49 | School 49 | Front Park | K | 8 | 1980 | Community Services building |
| 50 | School 50 | Emslie | Special | Education | 1975 | Demolished |
| 51 | Black Rock Academy | Black Rock | PreK | 8 | 2005 | Vacant |
| 52 | School 52 | Forest | K | 8 | 1980 | Demolished |
| 55 | School 55 | Broadway-Fillmore | K | 8 | 1955 | Demolished |
| 56 | School 56 | Albright | PreK | 8 | 2007 | Under reconstruction (apartments & office space) |
| 57 | Broadway Village Elementary School | Broadway-Fillmore | PreK | 6 | 2003 | Under reconstruction (Lt. Matt Urban Center) |
| 58 | School 58 | Broadway-Fillmore | K | 8 | 1961 | Demolished |
| 59 | School 59 | MLK Park | K | 8 | 1976 | Demolished |
| 60 | School 60 | Riverside | PreK | 4 | 2002 | Serves as low-income aparts |
| 62 | School 62 | MLK Park | K | 8 | 1980 | Houses Crucial Human Services |
| 63 | School 63 | LaSalle | PreK | 8 | 2007 | Houses The Lofts at University Heights |
| 70 | Indian Park Academy | Cazenovia Park | K | 8 | 2002 | Houses Western New York Maritime Charter Middle School |
| 71 | WEB Early Childhood Center | Schiller Park | PreK | 4 | 2007 | Houses King Center Charter School |
| 73 | School 73 | Columbus | K | 8 | 1970 | Demolished |
| 75 | School 75 | Emslie | K | 8 | 1979 | Vacant |
| 77 | School 77 | Front Park | PreK | 4 | 2006 | Senior housing and West Side community center |
| 78 | School 78 | LaSalle | PreK | 8 | 2008 | Vacant |
| 79 | School 79 | Military | K | 8 | 1976 | Northwest Community Center |
| 83 | School 83 | University Heights | K | 4 | 1976 | Houses Anderson Gallery for University at Buffalo |
| 85 | School 85 | Kensington | K | 4 | 1976 | Houses Charter School for Inquiry |
| 86 | St. Lawrence Academy | Starin Central | PreK | 4 | 2004 | Houses BPS' Adult Learning Program |
| 87 | School 87 | Willert Park | 5 | 12 | 2007 | Houses Office of Curriculum & Instruction |
| 88 | School 88 | North Park | K | 4 | 1979 | North Buffalo Community Center |
| 93 | School 93 | Masten Park | K | 4 | 1970's | Community Action Organization |
| 96 | Campus West School | Black Rock | PreK | 8 | 2011 | Used by Buffalo State College |
| 142 | Fulton Academic Complex | Perry | K | 8 | 1982 | Houses Schofield Adult Day Healthcare Center |
| 171 | WEB Middle School | Schiller Park | 5 | 8 | 2006 | Houses Buffalo Public Schools Commissionary |
| 192 | Buffalo Traditional School | Masten Park | 5 | 12 | 2005 | Houses Buffalo Academy for Visual & Performing Arts |
| 200 | Bennett High School | Starin Central | 9 | 12 | 2017 | Houses Bennett Campus |
| 202 | Grover Cleveland High School | Front Park | 9 | 12 | 2011 | Houses The International Preparatory School |
| 203 | Kensington High School | Kenfield | 9 | 12 | 2003 | Houses Frederick Law Olmsted High School |
| 204 | Lafayette High School | Forest | 9 | 12 | 2018 | Houses Lafayette Community School Campus |
| 205 | Riverside Institute of Technology | Riverside | 9 | 12 | 2019 | Houses Riverside Academy |
| 302 | Emerson Vocational High School | Emerson | 9 | 12 | 2002 | Houses Harvey Austin School |
| 306 | Seneca Vocational High School | Grider | 9 | 12 | 2003 | Houses Math Science Technology Campus |
| 307 | East High School | MLK Park | 9 | 12 | 2018 | Houses East Community School Campus |
| 307 | Buffalo Vocational Technical Center | MLK Park | 9 | 12 | 2003 | Houses East Campus |
