= Buffalo Elementary School of Technology =

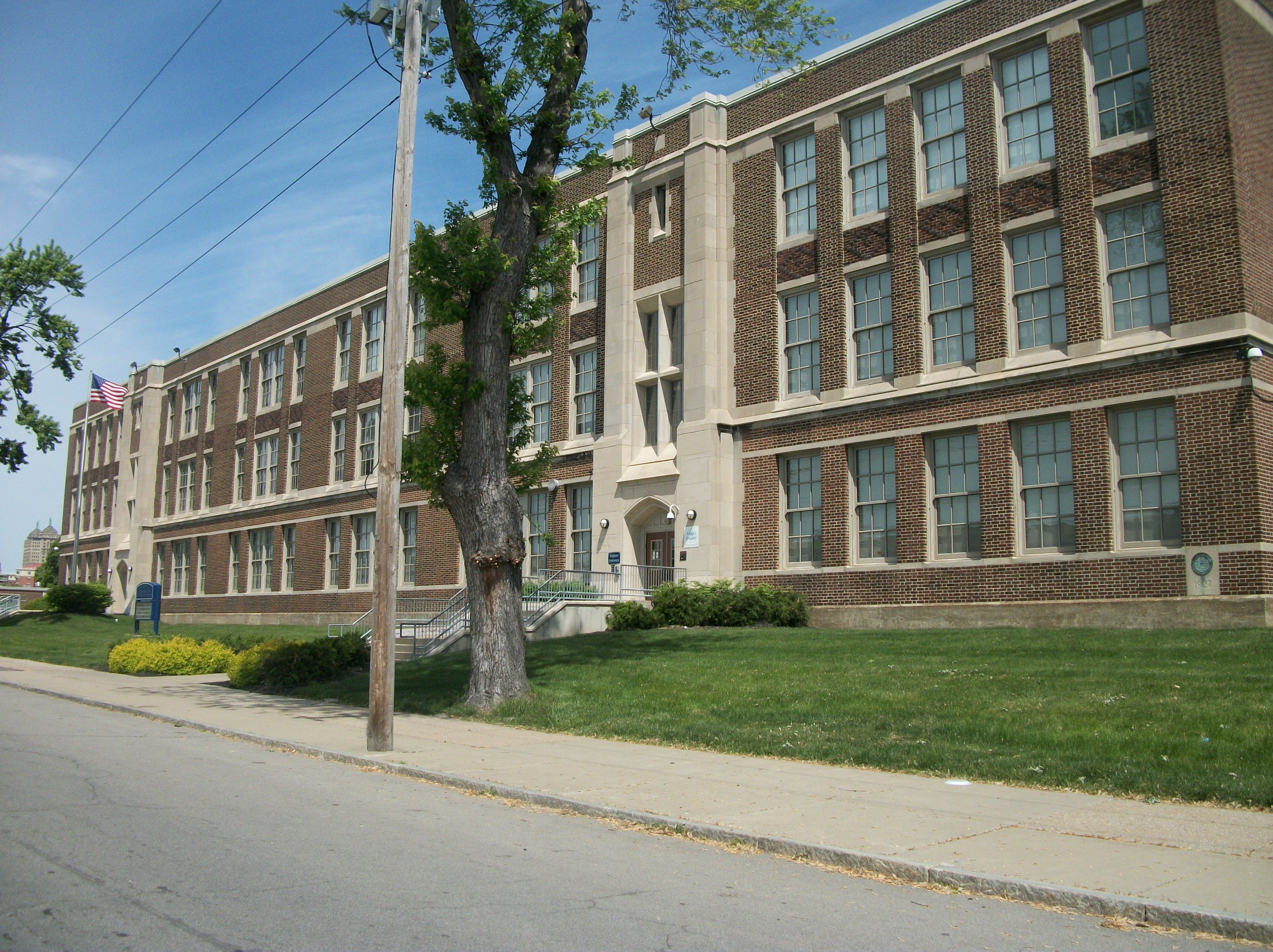

Location
- 414 South Division Street; Willert Park; Buffalo, Erie, New York 14204; United States
- Coordinates: 42°52′48.04″N 78°51′36.07″W

Information
- Status: Priority School
- School number: 6
- Principal: Karen R. Piotrowski
- Grades: K-8
- S.A.M.: Patrick J. Cook
- Website: BEST

Buffalo Elementary School of Technology (formerly P.S. 6 and later Academic Challenge Center) is an elementary school located in Buffalo, New York. It is located at 414 South Division Street in Buffalo and serves Grades K through 8. As of 2014 the acting principal is Karen Piotrowski. The previous principal, Sharon Brown, was transferred.

== History ==
The school was established in 1839 as P.S. 6. In 1977 the school became one of the first magnet schools in the city and was renamed the "Academic Challenge Center." In 1997 the school was renamed "Buffalo Elementary School of Technology" in response to the school adopting a program that would integrate technology use into all subject areas.

=== Former principals ===
Previous assignment and reason for departure denoted in parentheses

- Mary Caldwell
- S.G. Love
- Ephraim F. Cook
- Samuel Slade
- Henry H. Rogers
- William D. Fisher
- Thomas W. Connors
- Gordon H. Higgins
- Philip W. Patti
- David M. Hansen
- Jane Cunningham
- Paul Lafornara
- Edith James
- Marion Canedo–?-1991
- Bernice T. Richardson–1991-1995 (Director - Liberty Partnership Program at Buffalo State College, placed on leave)
- Nathaniel McCrea–1995-2007 (Assistant Principal - Frederick Law Olmsted 64, placed on assignment)
- Debra Sellivan-Pores–2007-2011 (Assistant Principal - International School 45, named Principal of West Hertel Academy)
- Sharon Brown–2011-2014 (Principal - West Hertel Academy, named Principal of D'Youville Porter Campus School)
