= Buffalo School of Culinary Arts & Hospitality Management =

Location
- 75 W Huron St; Buffalo, New York 14202
- 42.889187°N 78.876188°W

Information
- Former name: Emerson Annex
- School type: High school
- Established: May 5, 2020
- NCES School ID: 360585006643
- Principal: Kathleen Schuta
- Grades: 9—12
- Student to teacher ratio: 10.47

Buffalo School of Culinary Arts & Hospitality Management also known as PS 355 and formerly known as Emerson Annex is a culinary high school in Buffalo, New York located at 75 W. Huron St in downtown Buffalo and serves grades 9th through 12th.

== History ==
The school was established as the Emerson Annex, a sister school to the Buffalo Public Schools district's flagship culinary arts high school, in 2015 before having a new grand opening and renaming as the Buffalo School of Culinary Arts & Hospitality Management on March 5, 2020, having a grand opening for the school at the refurbished historic ground floor café C. W. Miller Livery Stable with modern kitchens, high-tech science labs, a brand new gymnasium and sixth-floor library overlooking the Buffalo skyline. The building that Buffalo School of Culinary Arts & Hospitality Management operates in was designed and refurbished by Buffalo architects Lansing and Beierl with the project being led by Mark Croce's Buffalo Development Corporation, which teamed up with McGuire Development. Buffalo Construction Consultants, Inc. served as project manager, with Kideney Architects, P.C. as project architect, the project cost around USD$40 million.

Since the establishment of the school, the principal has remained Kathleen Schuta.
