= C. W. Miller Livery Stable =

- U.S. National Register of Historic Places
- New York State Register of Historic Places
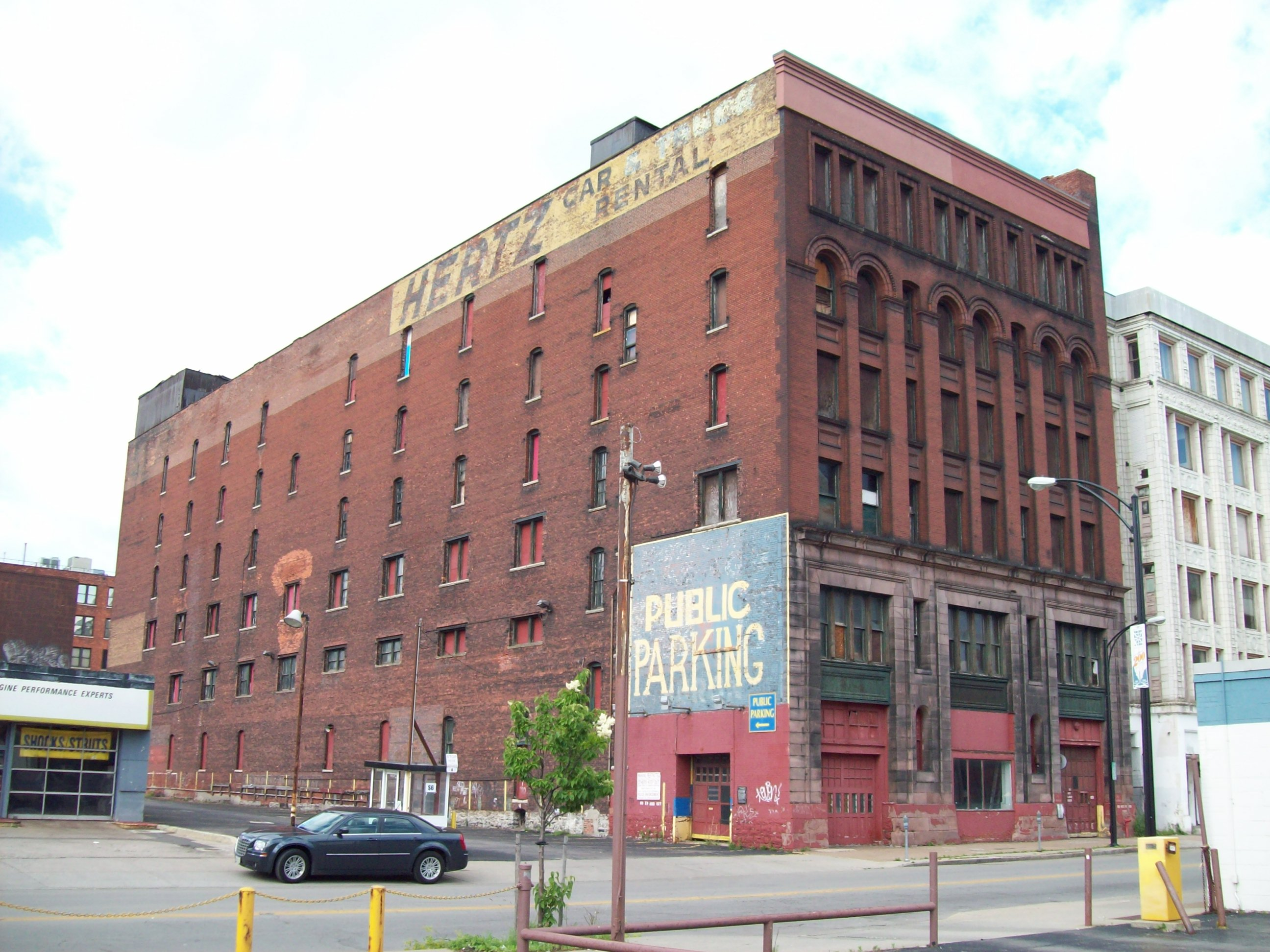
- C. W. Miller Livery Stable, June 2009

- Location within New York Location within the United States
- Location: 75 W. Huron St., Buffalo, New York
- Coordinates: 42°53′22.7004″N 78°52′34.197″W
- Built: 1892-94
- Architects: Lansing & Beierl
- NRHP reference No.: 07001259
- NYSRHP No.: 02940.002903

Significant dates
- Added to NRHP: December 11, 2007
- Designated NYSRHP: September 27, 2007

C. W. Miller Livery Stable is a historic multi-story livery stable located at Buffalo in Erie County, New York. It is a six-story, rectangular masonry building 65 feet wide and 236 feet deep, built between 1892 and 1894. As horses were phased out and automobiles became more common, it was converted for use as a parking garage.

Designed by Lansing and Beierl, it was nationally known because of its engineering and other innovations to handle the requirements of horses and wagons, coaches, etc. in a vertical environment. Originally built with long ramps, in the 1920s it was modified with steeper ramps so that motor vehicles could move more efficiently between floors. When opened, it was proclaimed a "palace for horses."

It was listed on the National Register of Historic Places in 2007.

The site was purchased in 2017 by Buffalo Public Schools for its Emerson School of Hospitality. It was redeveloped in conjunction with the late real estate developer Mark Croce in converting the facility to a culinary school, in partnership with the Curtiss Hotel next door.
