= Seneca Vocational High School =

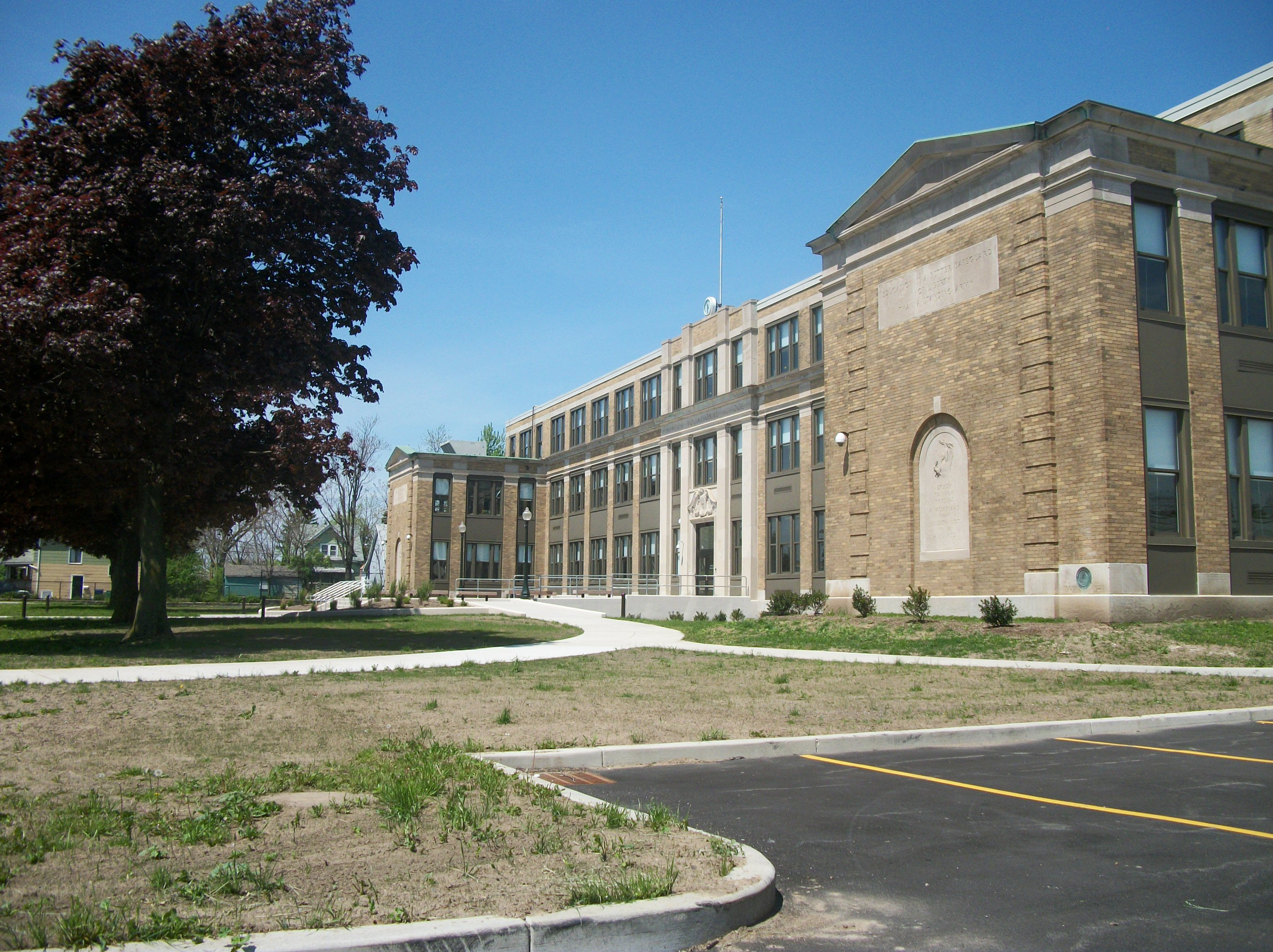

Location
- 666 East Delevan Avenue; Buffalo, New York 14215; United States; 42.9226°N 78.8324°W

Information
- Type: Public, Vocational
- Opened: September 7, 1926
- Closed: 2008
- School board: Buffalo Public Schools
- School number: 306
- Grades: 9-12
- Colors: Green and White
- Team name: Indians

Seneca Vocational High School, also known as Seneca Comprehensive High School and Seneca High School, is a former vocational high school located in Buffalo, New York. It was one of the first vocational schools built in Western New York. The building, located at 666 East Delavan Avenue in Buffalo, currently serves home to The Math, Science, Technology Preparatory School.

== History ==
Seneca was the oldest vocational high school in Buffalo, and was constructed three months after the first vocational school in the state of New York was completed. The building was constructed in 1925 and received an addition in 1955. Seneca High School stopped admitting new students in 2006, although it remained open so that the remaining classes of 2007 and 2008 were allowed to graduate. In the fall of 2006, the school reopened as the Math Science and Tech Prep at Seneca. From 2010 to 2012, the Seneca building was renovated by LPCiminelli. During that time, MST Prep students were educated at Black Rock Academy until Seneca was ready to be re-opened.

=== Former Principals ===
Previous assignment and reason for departure denoted in parentheses

- Elmer S. Pierce–1909-1943 (Principal - Seneca Vocational School, retired)
- Richard A. Reagan–1943-1950 (Principal - Emerson Vocational High School, retired)
- Laverne H. Engel–1950-1962 (Vice Principal - Seneca Vocational High School, retired)
- William E. Pritchard–1962-1967 (Principal - Fosdick-Masten Park High School, retired)
- Angelo F. Suozzi–1967-1975 (Vice Principal - Seneca Vocational High School, retired)
- Leonard S. Sikora–1975-1990 (Principal - Bennett High School, retired)
- Mark L. Balen–1990-1996 (Principal - Kensington High School, retired)
- Anne G. Flansburg–1996-1998 (Assistant Principal - Seneca Vocational High School, retired)
- Geraldine Horton–1998-2001 (Assistant Principal - Bennett High School, named Principal of Buffalo Vocational Technical Center)
- Robert M. Barton–2001-2006 (Principal - Kensington High School, retired)
- Pamela D. Rutland–2006-2008 (Assistant Principal - Hutchinson Central Technical High School, named Principal of Wilson Magnet High School)

== Notable alumni ==
- Damone Brown – National Basketball Association player
- Van Jakes – National Football League player
- Michael Norwood, Premiere Basketball League player
- Bill Schuster – Major League Baseball player
