= The International Preparatory School =

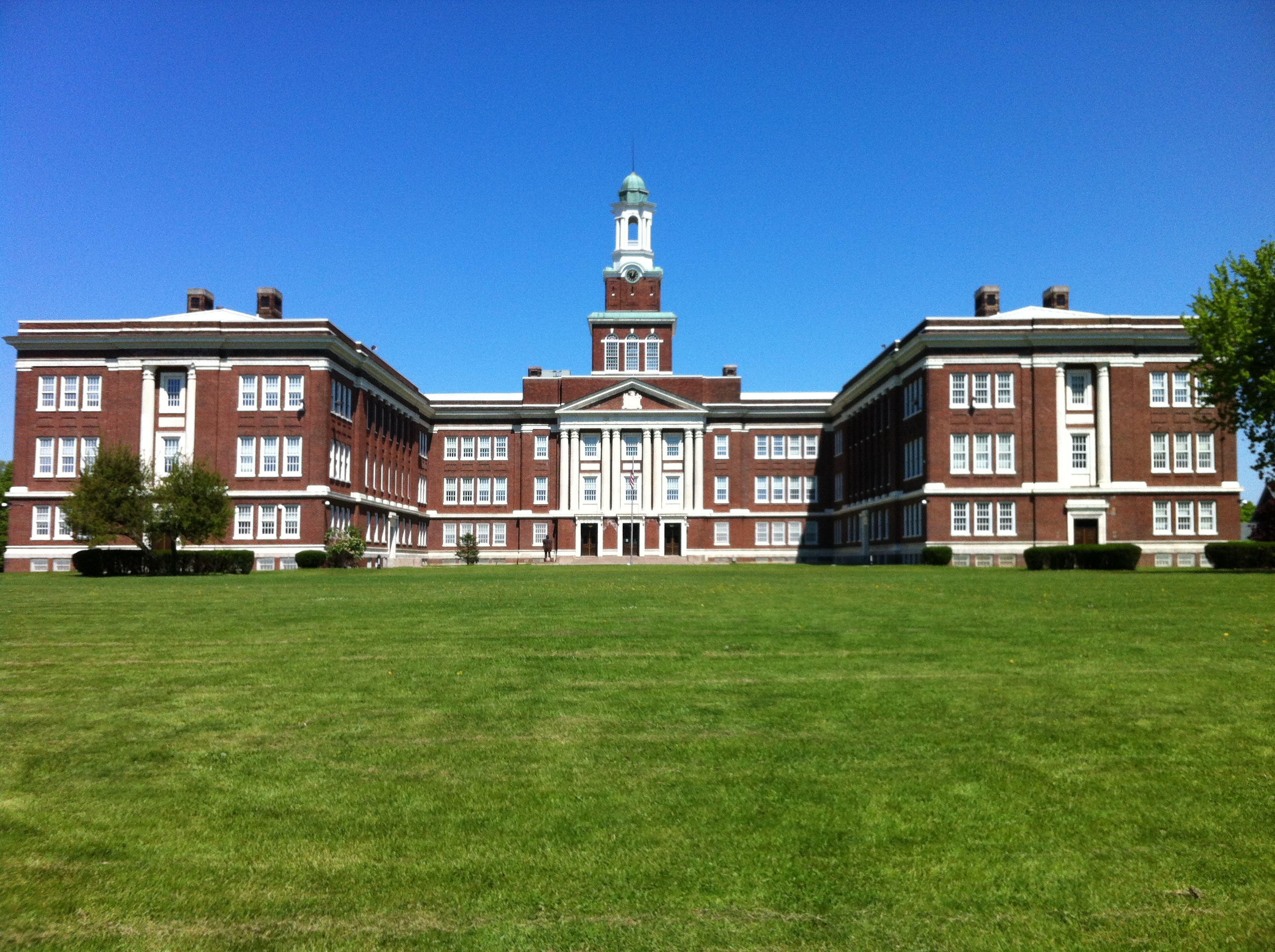

Location
- 110 14th Street; Front Park; Buffalo, Erie, New York 14213; United States; 42.9042107°N 78.8847496°W

Information
- Motto: Bringing the World into Focus.
- Established: 2007
- Status: Good Standing
- Superintendent: Dr. Tonja Williams
- School number: 198
- Principal: Natalie Houck
- Grades: 9-12
- Enrollment: 800
- Team name: Presidents
- Website: http://www.buffaloschools.org/ps198

The International Preparatory School is a high school that serves grades 9–12 in the Lower West Side of Buffalo, New York . It focuses on providing ample college coursework to prepare its students for post-secondary education. The school chiefly draws on the largely immigrant population of the West Side, and over 40 languages are spoken by the student body. The current principal is Ms. Ella Dunne.

== History ==
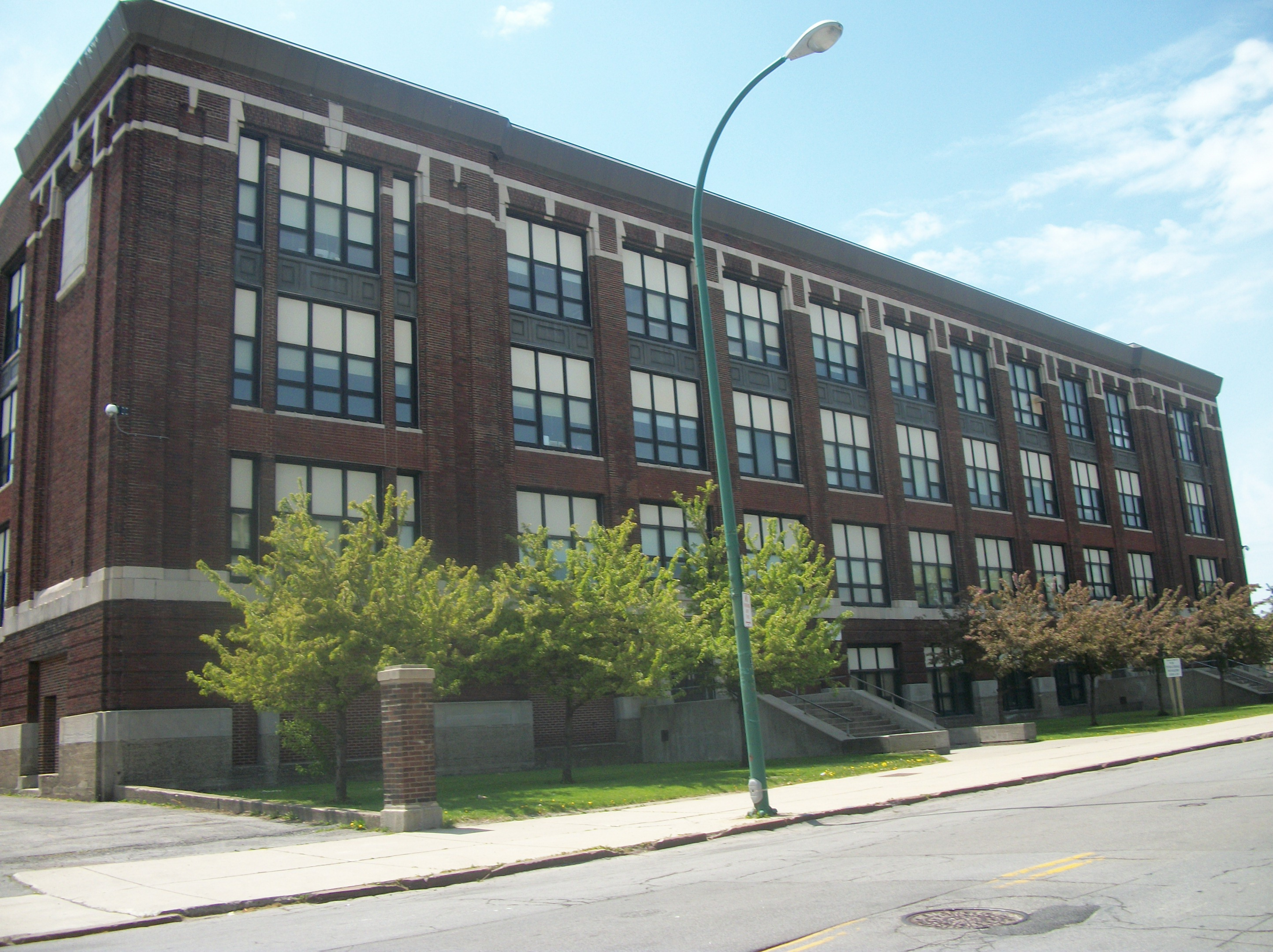
I-Prep's temporary location on Clinton Street from 2011 to 2013

The school was first established in 2007 as a school within a school at Grover Cleveland High School to serve the growing diversity of Buffalo's Lower West Side. From 2007 to 2011, the school was based in the building while sharing space with the Grover Cleveland High School students. From 2011 to 2013, International Prep was housed in the former PS 187 Buffalo Academy for Visual & Performing Arts while renovations were being made to the Grover Cleveland building. International Prep returned to Grover Cleveland High in 2013.

=== Former principal ===
Previous assignment and reason for departure denoted in parentheses

- Kevin J. Eberle–2007-2013 (Principal - Grover Cleveland High School, named Interim Principal of School 115)
- Carlos Alvarez–2013-2017 (Assistant Principal - West Hertel Academy, named Principal of Lewis J. Bennett School of Innovative Technology)

== Academics ==
When the school was established, International Prep was accredited with College Board. Over years, this relationship has since ended. The school continues to offer Advanced Placement courses, and dual enrollment college courses with Niagara University and SUNY Erie. In total, the school boasts enough college-level classes for students to earn nearly 70 college credits.

The school offers an Architecture & Design academy through University at Buffalo for its high school students. Other programs include its Business Academy and Multilingual Teacher Academy. In order to apply to its Multilingual Teacher Academy, student needs to submit grades, attendance, and a teacher's recommendation.

It is partnered with Niagara University, SUNY Erie, University at Buffalo, D'Youville College, Father Belle Center, and Community Action Organization.
