= Public School No. 63 =

- U.S. National Register of Historic Places
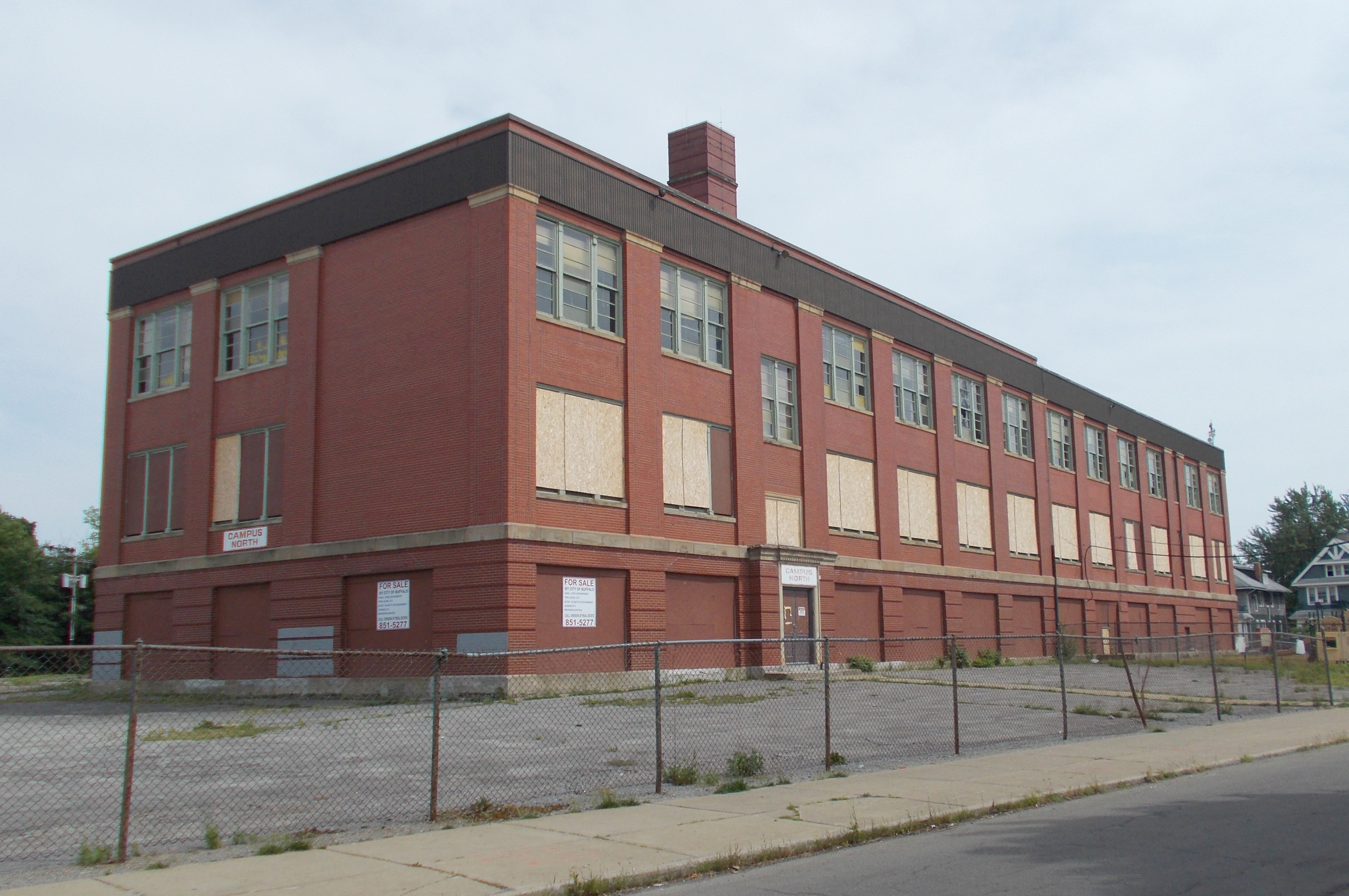
- Public School No. 63, July 2016

- Location within New York Location within the United States
- Location: 91 Lisbon Avenue, Buffalo, New York
- Coordinates: 42°56′51″N 78°49′37″W
- Area: 1.81 acres (0.73 ha)
- Built: 1917, 1925
- Architect: Howard L. Beck (1917); Associated Buffalo Architects (1925)
- Architectural style: Classical Revival
- NRHP reference No.: 16000587
- Added to NRHP: August 25, 2016

Public School No. 63, also known as Campus North School, is a historic school building located in the Kensington-Bailey neighborhood of Buffalo, Erie County, New York. The original section was built in 1917, and is two stories above a ground floor, giving the appearance of a three-story red brick building with Classical Revival detailing. The original H-shaped plan consisted of classrooms located in the wings, with gymnasium, swimming pool and auditorium located centrally. Northeast and northwest corner additions were built in 1925. The building is an example of a typical standardized public school plan developed by city architect Howard L. Beck. The school has been redeveloped as an apartment building known as The Lofts at University Heights.

It was listed on the National Register of Historic Places in 2016.
