= Follow Through Magnet School =

Follow Through Urban Learning Lab School
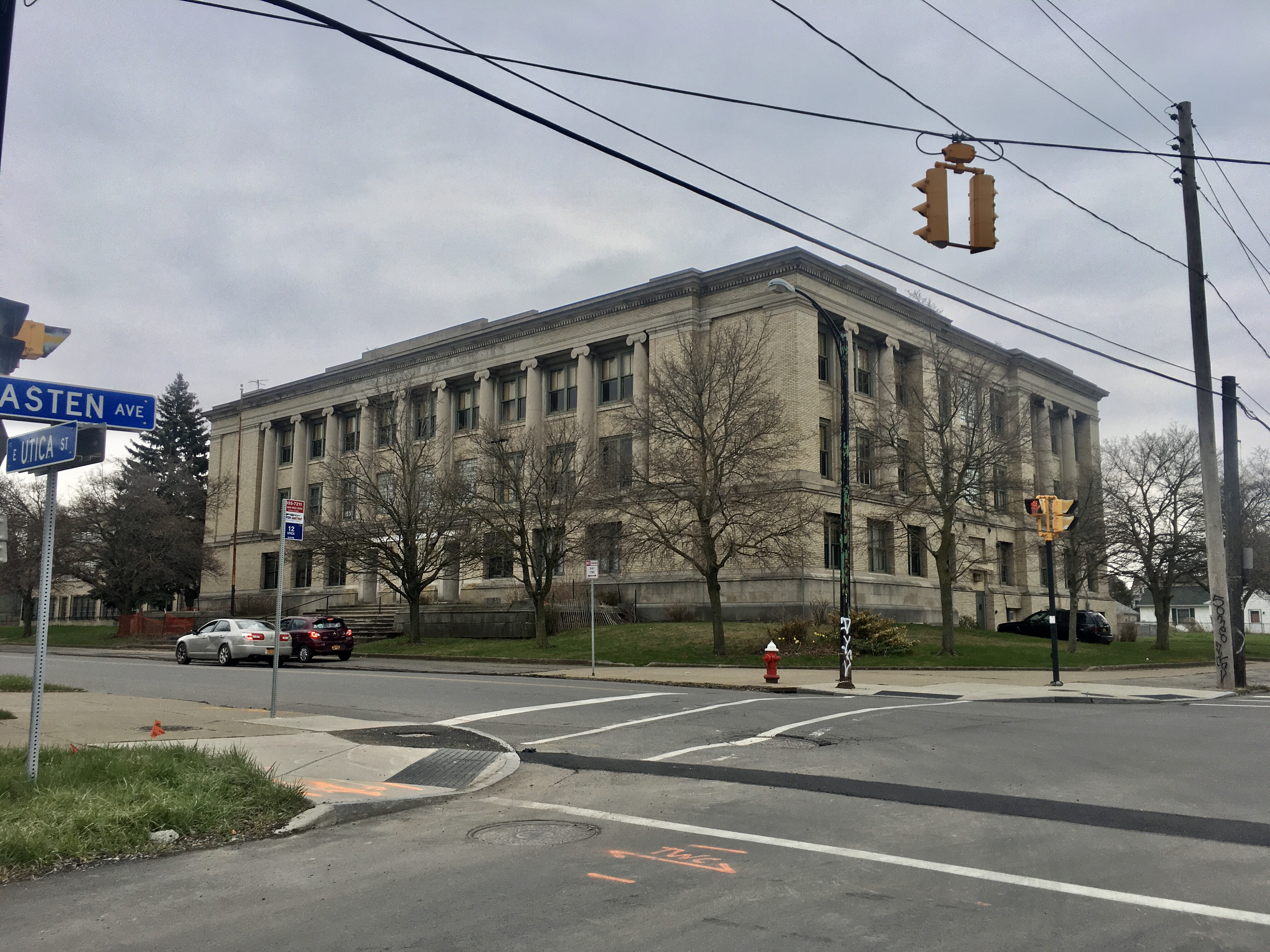
- as seen in April 2020

Location
- 167 East Utica Street; Masten Park; Buffalo, Erie, New York 14209; United States; 42.913019°N 78.865799°W

Information
- Established: 1838
- Closed: 2004
- School number: 8
- Grades: K-8

Follow Through Magnet School (formerly School 8) is a former elementary school in Buffalo, New York. It served Grades K through 8 and was located at the corner of East Utica Street and Masten Avenue in the city's East Side. It closed in 2004, although it has served as a swing school for other schools that are being reconstructed.

== History ==
School 8 was built in 1838 at the corners of Franklin and Church Streets, the first school building that was built under the reorganized Buffalo Public Schools district. It came under criticism for its construction as its elaborate design and front pillars were more than required for the new school system. This building would be closed in 1883 due to a lack of enrollment, and the number 8 was transferred to a new school built in the growing East Side. In 1918, this building was destroyed by fire and replaced the following year by the current building. An addition was built to the school in 1961, and had a name change in 1976 as part of the desegregation plan. The building was closed in 2004 due to budget cuts, but served as a swing school for Dr. Martin Luther King Jr. Multicultural Institute, City Honors High School, and School 81 while their home buildings were being reconstructed. The building may be used to house Middle Early College High School and Buffalo's Adult Learning Program beginning with the 2013–2014 school year

=== Former principals ===
Previous assignment and reason for departure denoted in parentheses

- Ellen C. Bragg
- Silas Sweet
- Edward L. Chamberlyn
- Samuel Slade
- George H. Stowits
- Ella D. Barker
- Dwight D. Walbridge
- Elsie A. Gazlag
- Byron Heath
- Francis B. Snavely
- Marie B. Mockler
- Harold D. Axelrod–?-1966
- Donald Beck–1966-1991
- Margaret A. Forrester–1991-2001 (Principal - Campus West School, retired)
- Kathleen Franklin–2001-2004 (Principal - School 82, named Principal of Poplar E.C.C. 11)
