= Lydia T. Wright =

American pediatrician (1922 – 2006)

- Lydia T. Wright, from a 1962 publication
- Born: Lydia Tura Wright; May 5, 1922; Shreveport, Louisiana, U.S.
- Died: October 23, 2006 (aged 84); Buffalo, New York, U.S.
- Occupations: Pediatrician, community leader

Lydia Tura Wright (May 5, 1922 – October 23, 2006) was an American pediatrician based in Buffalo, New York. She was the first Black member of the Buffalo Board of Education, and worked to desegregate the city's schools. In 2000, a school in Buffalo was named for her.

== Early life and education ==
Wright was born in Shreveport, Louisiana, and raised in Cincinnati, Ohio, the daughter of Nathan Wright and Parthenia Hickman Wright. Her parents were both college graduates. Her grandfather Benjamin Hickman was a Black physician in Cincinnati, and her father was the executive director of the NAACP in Cincinnati. She attended the University of Cincinnati from 1939 to 1941, and Fisk University from 1942 to 1944. She earned her medical degree from Meharry Medical College in 1947. She was a member of the Alpha Kappa Alpha sorority.

Wright's younger brother Nathan Wright Jr. was a minister, author, and civil rights activist.

== Career ==
Wright was the first Black woman pediatrician in Buffalo, New York, where she practiced from 1952 to 1988. She taught in the medical school of the University at Buffalo and was on the staff of several hospitals. She was appointed to the board of directors of the Planned Parenthood Center of Buffalo in 1958. In 1959 she was elected a fellow of the American Academy of Pediatrics, and hosted a meeting of the Women Physicians League in her home.

Wright was also the first Black member of the Buffalo Board of Education. She was appointed in 1962 and worked to desegregate the city's schools, and to establish more effective disciplinary policies. Her term on the board expired in 1967.

Wright spoke to an audience of Eastern Star members in 1963, saying "We no longer want just civil rights; we want and deserve full recognition of the dignity of the individual." She received the Education Award from the NAACP in 1964, the William G. Conable Award in 1967, a Brotherhood Week Award in 1968, and the NAACP's Medgar Evers Award in 1988. In 2002 the Buffalo Urban League presented Wright and her husband with their Family Life Award, for their professional and civic contributions. She served on the board of the East Side Community Organization (ESCO) and was active in Episcopal Church work.

== Personal life and legacy ==
Wright married fellow physician Frank G. Evans in 1951. They had two children. She died in 2006, at the age of 84. The Lydia T. Wright School for Excellence in Buffalo was named for her in 2000. Her papers are in the collection of the University at Buffalo Libraries. She is one of the 28 civil rights figures depicted on Buffalo's Freedom Wall, at the Buffalo AKG Art Museum.
