= Kensington High School (Buffalo, New York) =

High school in Buffalo, New York

Frederick Law Olmsted School #156
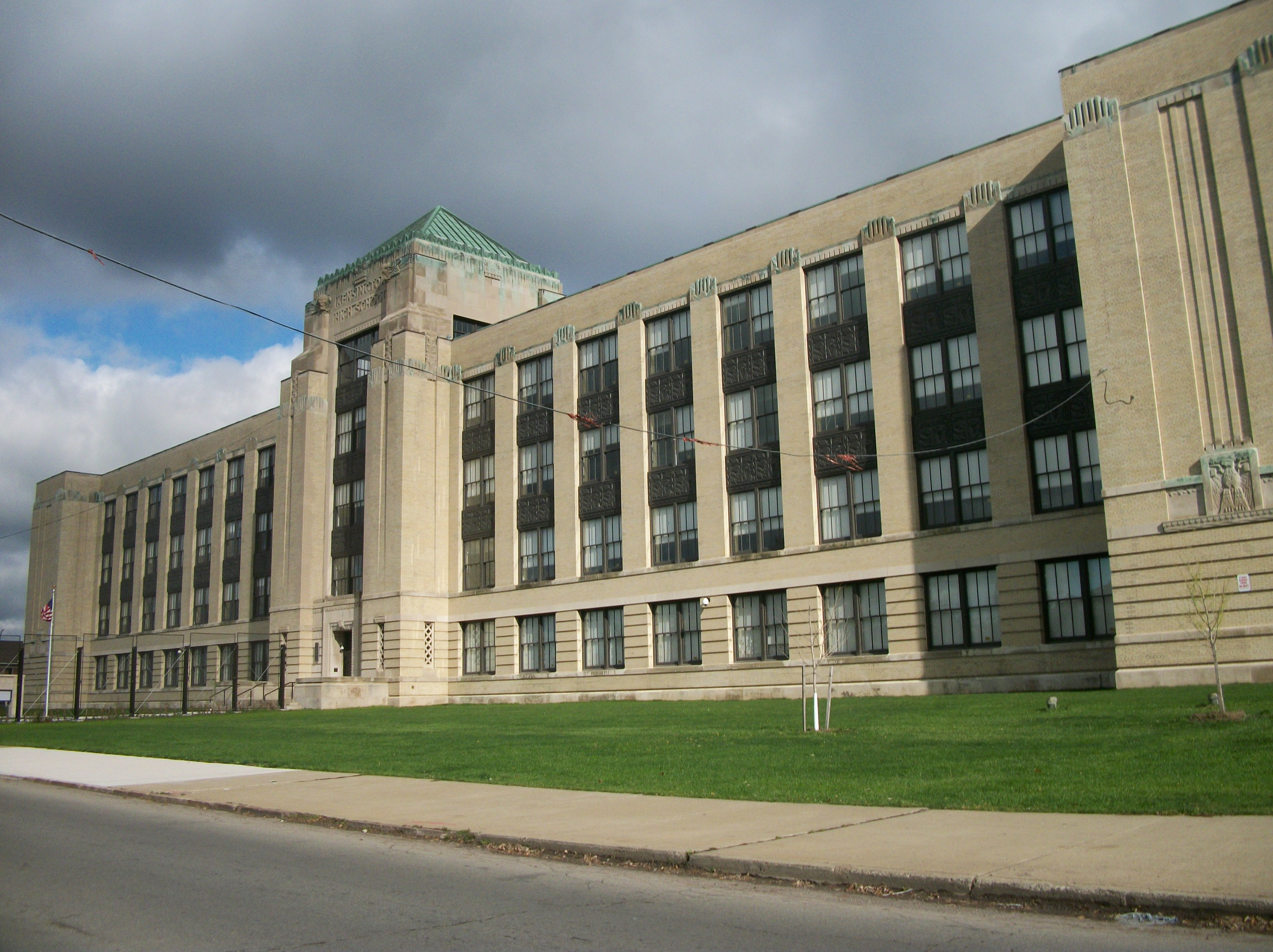

Location
- 319 Suffolk Street; Kensington; Buffalo, Erie, New York 14215; United States; 42°55′51.90″N 78°48′37.66″W

Information
- Type: Public
- Motto: Aegis Fortissima Virtus (Virtue is the Strongest Shield)
- Opened: September 9, 1937
- Status: Closed
- Closed: 2003
- School district: Buffalo Public Schools
- School number: 203
- Grades: 9-12
- Colors: Green and Gold
- Team name: Kensington Knights
- Yearbook: The Compass

Frederick Law Olmsted School #156 is a high school located in Buffalo, New York. Named for the Kensington neighborhood it is located in, the building is located at 319 Suffolk Street in Buffalo. It currently serves as home to the Frederick Law Olmsted School at Kensington.

== History ==
Kensington High School is one of three Art Deco buildings in the City of Buffalo. The building was constructed in 1934 and opened on September 9, 1937, operating for 66 years. The school was closed in 2003 due to a myriad of reasons including poor academic performance, a high concentration of students in poverty, the threat of take over from New York State, increasing student violence, as well as the school district's financial crisis.

In the years that followed, Kensington housed adult GED and vocational classes, and was one of the locations for Buffalo's Opportunity Program, an alternative school service for suspended students, as well as the temporary home of Hutchinson Central Technical High School while it was renovated from 2005 to 2007. It was later announced that the building would be the home for Olmsted High School. Olmsted was operated at Kensington from 2007 to 2010 before the building was renovated by LPCiminelli from 2010 to 2012. In Fall 2012, Kensington reopened to Olmsted students.

Kensington was also home to the Buffalo Academy of Science and Math, a small magnet high school, from 1989 to 1993 when it was moved to Riverside High School.

== Notable alumni ==
- Dick Hughes–Former National Football League halfback
- Ed Hughes–Former National Football League coach
- Angela Stribling - BET host, radio host, and jazz singer

== Kensington Prep ==
Kensington Prep
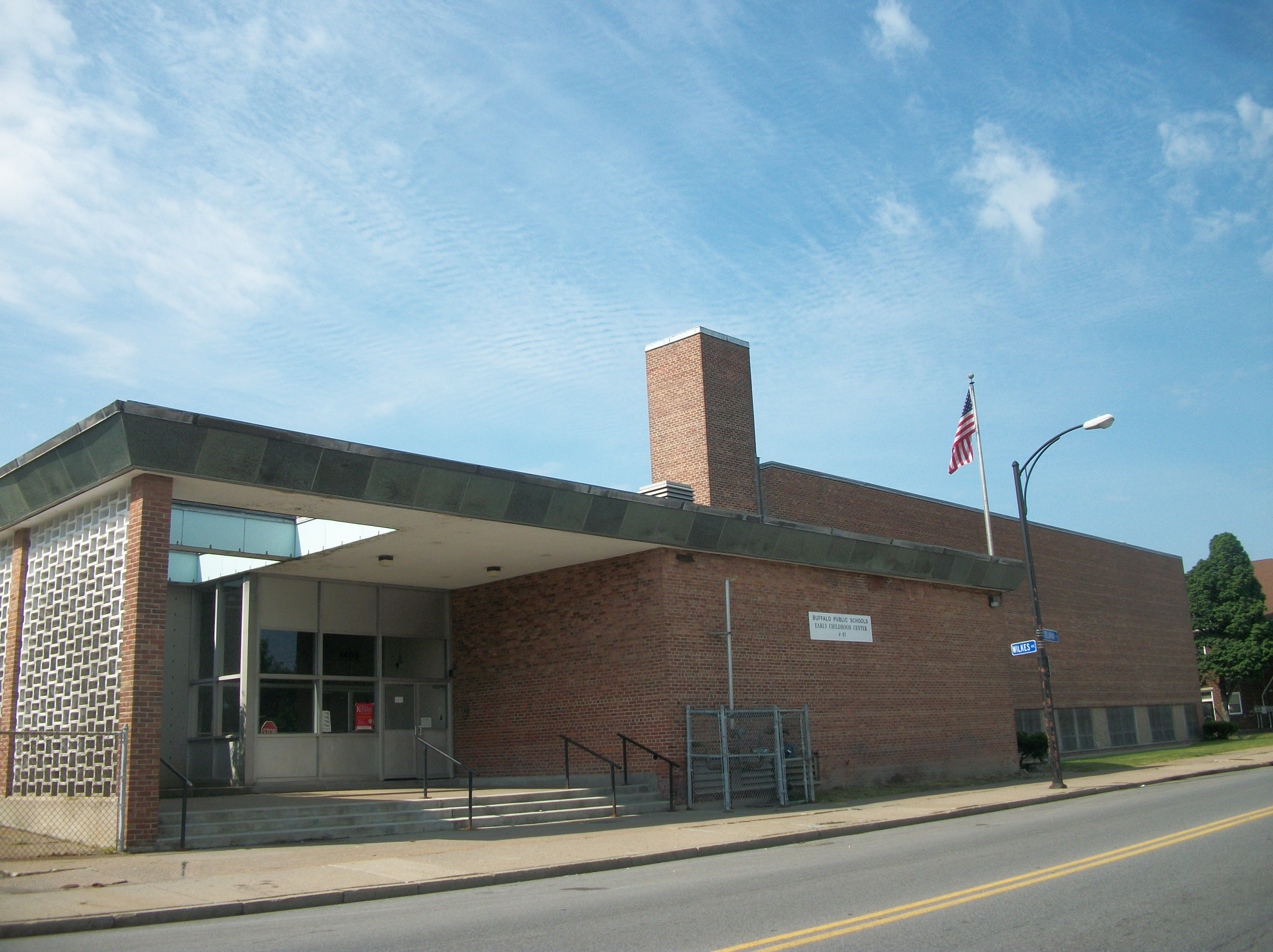

Location
- 1409 East Delavan Avenue; Schiller Park; Buffalo, Erie, New York 14215; United States

Information
- Type: Public
- Opened: 1987
- Closed: 1993
- Grades: 9

From 1987 to 1993, Kensington High had a satellite school, "Kensington Prep" for its ninth graders, in an effort to provide a structured atmosphere for its freshmen and attract more Caucasian students. The school was located at the former Archbishop Carroll High School at 1409 East Delavan Avenue, and offered enriched programs in mathematics, sciences, and computers. The school was closed in 1993, and 9th graders returned to Kensington.
