= Dick Hughes (American football) =

American football player (born 1932)

No. 24
- Position: Halfback

Personal information
- Born: September 26, 1929; Buffalo, New York, U.S.
- Died: May 5, 2018 (aged 88); Tulsa, Oklahoma
- Listed height: 5 ft 9 in (1.75 m)
- Listed weight: 185 lb (84 kg)

Career information
- High school: Kensington (NY)
- College: Tulsa
- NFL draft: 1957: 11th round, 127th overall pick

Career history
- Pittsburgh Steelers (1957)

Career NFL statistics
- Games played: 1
- Rushing Yards: 6
- Stats at Pro Football Reference

Richard Hughes (September 26, 1929 - May 5, 2018) was an American former professional football player who was a halfback for the Pittsburgh Steelers of the National Football League (NFL). He played college football for the Tulsa Golden Hurricane.
