= Freedom Wall =

Mural in Buffalo, New York

The Freedom Wall, located at the corner of Michigan Avenue and East Ferry Street in Buffalo, New York, is a mural depicting twenty-eight civil rights leaders active anytime from the 19th to the 21st centuries, ranging from William Wells Brown (born 1815) to Alicia Garza (born 1981). The project was commissioned by the Albright–Knox Art Gallery's Public Art Initiative in 2017, along with a 30-minute film of the same name about the mural. In 2019, WNED-TV broadcast the film about the mural.

== History ==
Commissioned by Aaron Ott, the curator of the Albright–Knox Art Gallery's Public Art Initiative, the mural was initially intended to be by Chuck Tingley alone, but following comments by the African-American community, African-American artists John Baker, Julia Bottoms and Edreys Wajed were also hired to work on the wall. Each artist completed seven panels of the mural, which took two months.

== Mural ==
The mural depicts twenty-eight civil rights leaders, chosen from 300 suggestions. It is fifteen feet high and 300 feet long and located at the corner of Michigan Avenue and East Ferry Street in Buffalo, New York. The figures included are:

- Actor George K. Arthur
- Journalist and editor Al-Nisa Banks
- Abolitionist and novelist William Wells Brown
- Stokely Carmichael, who coined the term "Black Power"
- Civil rights activist Mama Charlene Miller Caver
- Congresswoman Shirley Chisholm
- Academic and activist Angela Davis
- Historian and activist W. E. B. Du Bois
- Abolitionist Frederick Douglass
- Historian Eva Doyle
- Democratic politician Arthur O. Eve
- Historian Monroe Fordham
- Bus driver and activist Bill Gaiter
- Journalist and leader Marcus Garvey
- Black Lives Matter co-founder Alicia Garza
- Politician Minnie Gillette
- Women's suffrage activist Fannie Lou Hamer
- Civil rights activist Martin Luther King Jr.
- Civil rights activist Malcolm X
- Lawyer Thurgood Marshall
- Publisher Frank Merriweather
- Reverend J. Edward Nash, Sr.
- Black Panther Party co-founder Huey P. Newton
- Activist Rosa Parks, known for the Montgomery bus boycott
- Democratic politician King Peterson
- Suffragist Mary Burnett Talbert
- Abolitionist Harriet Tubman
- Pediatrician Lydia T. Wright
