= Andre Coleman (defensive end) =

American football player (born 1984)

No. 78
- Position: Defensive end

Personal information
- Born: July 26, 1984 (age 42); Buffalo, New York, U.S.
- Listed height: 6 ft 3 in (1.91 m)
- Listed weight: 287 lb (130 kg)

Career information
- College: Albany
- NFL draft: 2007: undrafted

Career history
- San Diego Chargers (2007–2009); Edmonton Eskimos (2010)

Awards and highlights
- First-team Mid-Major All-America (2006); First-team All-Northeast Conference (2005, 2006)
- Stats at Pro Football Reference

Andre Coleman (born July 26, 1984) is an American former professional football a player who was a defensive end in the National Football League (NFL) and Canadian Football League (CFL). He played college football for the Albany Great Danes and was signed by the NFL's San Diego Chargers as an undrafted free agent in 2007. Coleman is now a coach at Serra High School (San Diego, CA).

== Early life ==
Coleman attended Burgard Vocational High School in Buffalo, New York and was a letterman in football, baseball, and bowling. In football, he was an All-Western New York selection and a Class C All-State second-team selection. He shattered school record with 18 sacks and totaled 88 tackles, five forced fumbles and three fumble recoveries as a senior captain. He also played tight end and fullback andught two touchdown passes and scored three 2-point conversions.

== College career ==
As a senior, he earned First-team Mid-Major All-America honors as senior. He finished career with 110 tackles, 14 sacks and 35 tackles for loss he was named First-team All-Northeast Conference last season and one of two defensive linemen with 30-plus tackles Has earned three varsity letters. In 2005, he was named squad's top defensive lineman in leading a unit that ranked 11th nationally in scoring against (17.6 points/ game) and tied for first on the team with 4.5 sacks and was second on team with 12.0 tackles for a loss. In 2004, he made 22 tackles, including four for losses as a junior. In 2003, he appeared in all 11 games and made 14 tackles, including 3.0 sacks, and had two pass deflections.

== Professional career ==
=== San Diego Chargers ===
He was signed by the Chargers as an undrafted free agent in 2007.

After being placed on the Chargers practice squad before week one in 2009 he was activated for the Monday Night game against the Oakland Raiders on September 14.

Coleman was later released by the Chargers to make room for veteran defensive tackle Alfonso Boone
