= School 13 =

- U.S. National Register of Historic Places
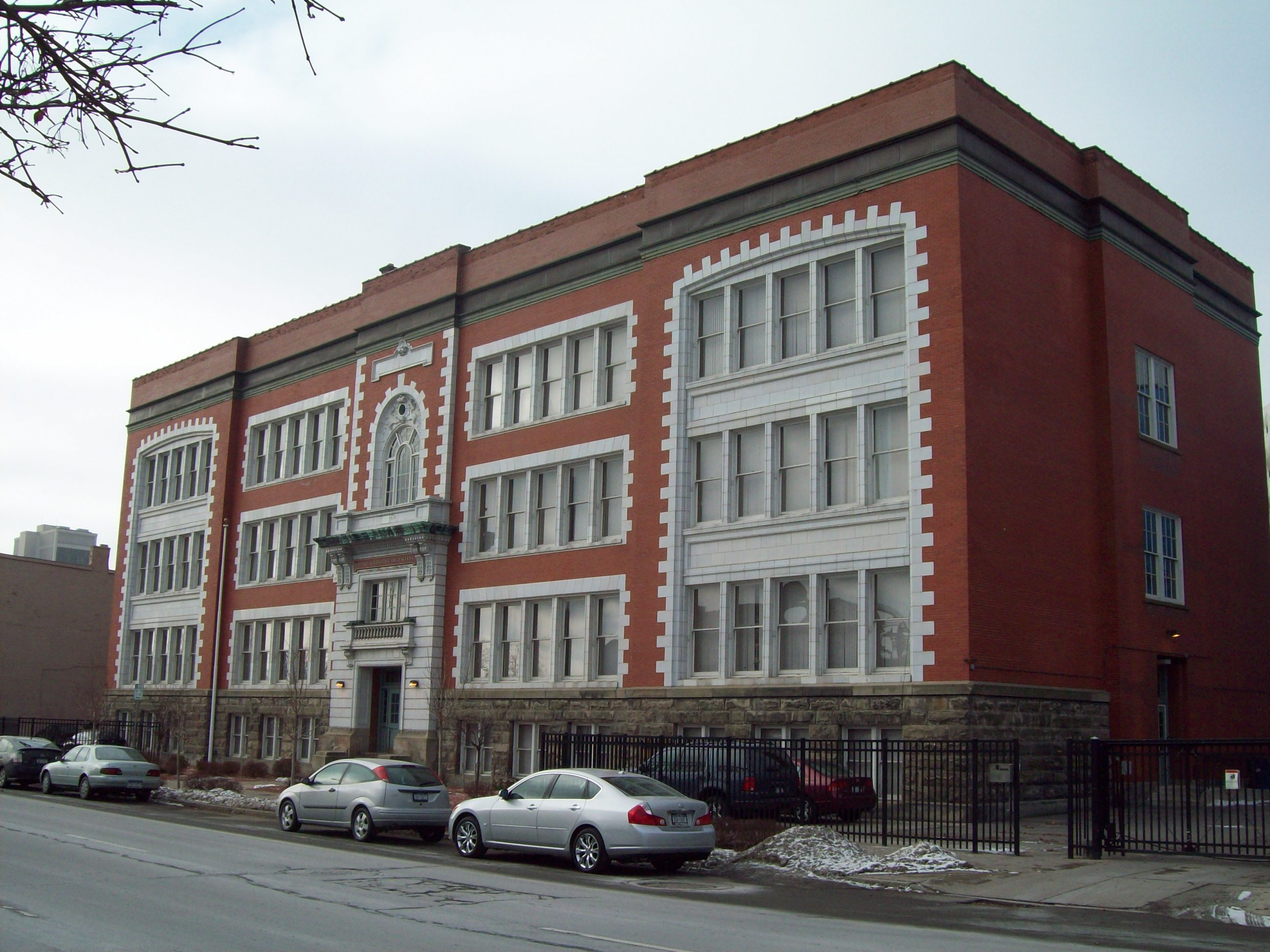
- School 13, December 2009

- Location within New York Location within the United States
- Location: 266-268 Oak St., Buffalo, New York
- Coordinates: 42°53′20″N 78°52′13″W
- Area: less than one acre
- Built: 1915
- Architect: Metzger, George J.
- Architectural style: Beaux Arts
- NRHP reference No.: 05000161
- Added to NRHP: March 15, 2005

School 13, also known as Boys Vocational High School and Buffalo Alternative High School, is a historic school building located at Buffalo in Erie County, New York. It was built about 1915, and is a three-story, steel framed building sheathed in brick and terra cotta with Beaux-Arts style design elements. The T-shaped building housed administrative offices, classrooms, a gymnasium, swimming pool, and two-story auditorium. The building housed a school until 2003.

It was listed on the National Register of Historic Places in 2005.
