= Willie Evans (running back) =

American football player (1937–2017)

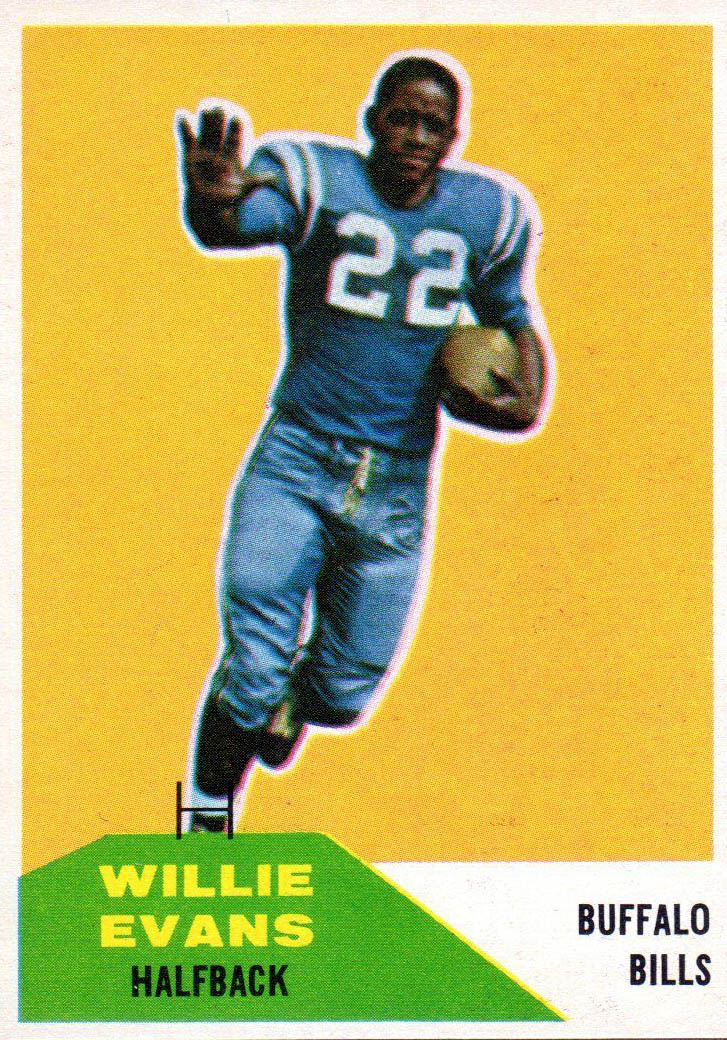
- Evans with the Buffalo Bills on a Fleer card, 1960

No. 48
- Position: Halfback

Personal information
- Born: December 1, 1937; Buffalo, New York
- Died: January 4, 2017 (aged 79); Buffalo, New York

Career information
- High school: Buffalo (NY) Emerson
- College: Buffalo
- AFL draft: 1960: 1st round

Career history
- Buffalo Bills (1960)*
- * Offseason or practice squad member only

Awards and highlights
- UB Athletic Hall of Fame (1978); Greater Buffalo Sports Hall of Fame (2009)

Willie Roy Evans (December 1, 1937 – January 4, 2017) was a running back for the University at Buffalo football team in the late 1950s.

In 1958, the Buffalo Bulls refused an offer to play Florida State University in the Tangerine Bowl because Evans and backup defensive end Mike Wilson were not welcome to play in Orlando because they were black. After graduation, Evans was drafted by Ralph Wilson for the inaugural season of the American Football League's Buffalo Bills. After his football career, Willie Evans taught in Buffalo area schools for more than 30 years. He coached football, and tennis and swimming, and ran a city parks program for most of that time as well. He served as an adviser for the university's alumni association.

Evans died in Buffalo on January 4, 2017, aged 79.

== See also ==
- Buffalo Bulls football
