= Emerson Vocational High School =

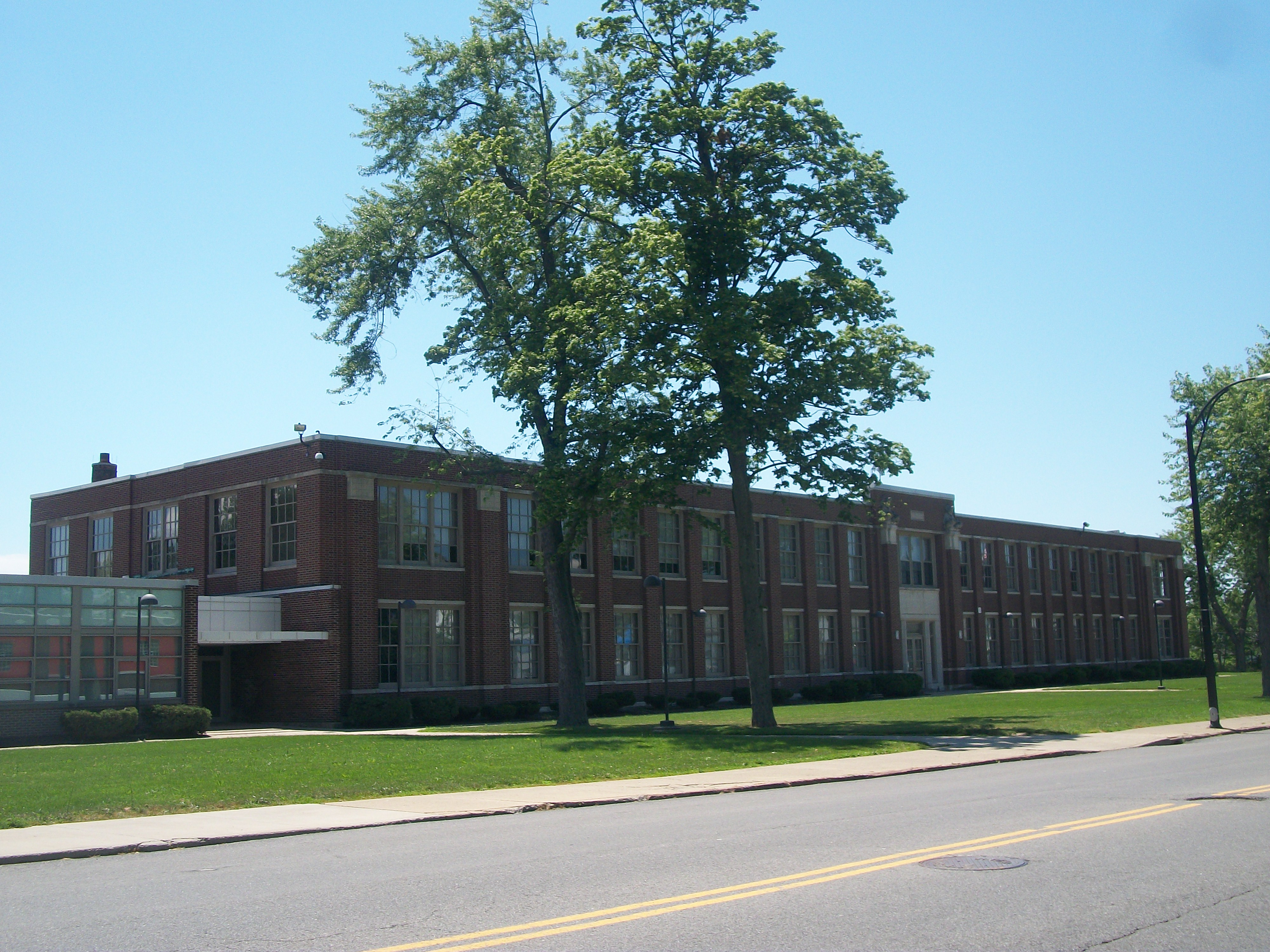

Location
- 1405 Sycamore Street; Emerson; 14211

Information
- Status: Closed
- School number: 302
- Grades: 9-12
- Enrollment: co-ed in 1972
- Team name: Eagles

Emerson Vocational High School was a vocational high school in Buffalo, New York. It was located at 1405 Sycamore Street in Buffalo's East Side and served Grades 9 through 12. It closed in 2002. Emerson re-opened that fall as the Emerson School of Hospitality located at 86 West Chippewa Street, in Buffalo's Downtown Entertainment District, with a restaurant and banquet facility open to the public and managed by students and teachers.

== History ==
Emerson High School was one of Buffalo's multiple vocational schools, focusing on upholstery, tailoring, cabinetmaking, machine shop, welding, drafting, painting, baking and culinary arts. The school was formed in the early 1911 as Peckham Boys Vocational High School. In 1926, the Sycamore Street building was constructed. The school would later be renamed for former Buffalo Superintendent Henry P. Emerson. In 1975, the school became co-ed. The school closed in 2002, but re-opened on Chippewa Street as Emerson School of Hospitality. The building was renovated and now houses School 97, Harvey Austin School.

== Former principals ==
Previous assignment and reason for departure denoted in parentheses

- William W. Miller–1911-1933 (unknown, retired)
- Richard A. Reagen–1933-1950 (unknown, named Principal of Seneca Vocational High School)
- David Warnhoff–1950-1954 (Vice Principal - Emerson Vocational High School, retired)
- John F. Collins–1954-1960
- Robert E. May–1960-? (Vice Principal - Seneca Vocational High School, unknown)
- Robert Fritzinger–?-1977 (Assistant Principal - Girls Vocational High School, named Assistant Superintendent of Buffalo Public Schools)
- Edmund Olczak–1977-1980 (Assistant Principal - Girls Vocational High School, died)
- John F. Robinson; 1980-1984 (unknown, deceased)
- Angelo J. Gianturco–1988 (Interim Principal - West Hertel Academy, retired)
- Salvatore J. Sedita–1988-1998 (Vice Principal - Burgard Vocational High School, retired)
- John G. Lyon–1998-2002 closed last graduating class in 2002 (Assistant Principal - Grover Cleveland High School, retired)
- James G. Weimer, Jr.–2002-2005 (Project Coordinator for satellite school on Chippewa - Emerson Vocational High School of Hospitality, school closed)

Emerson School of Hospitality
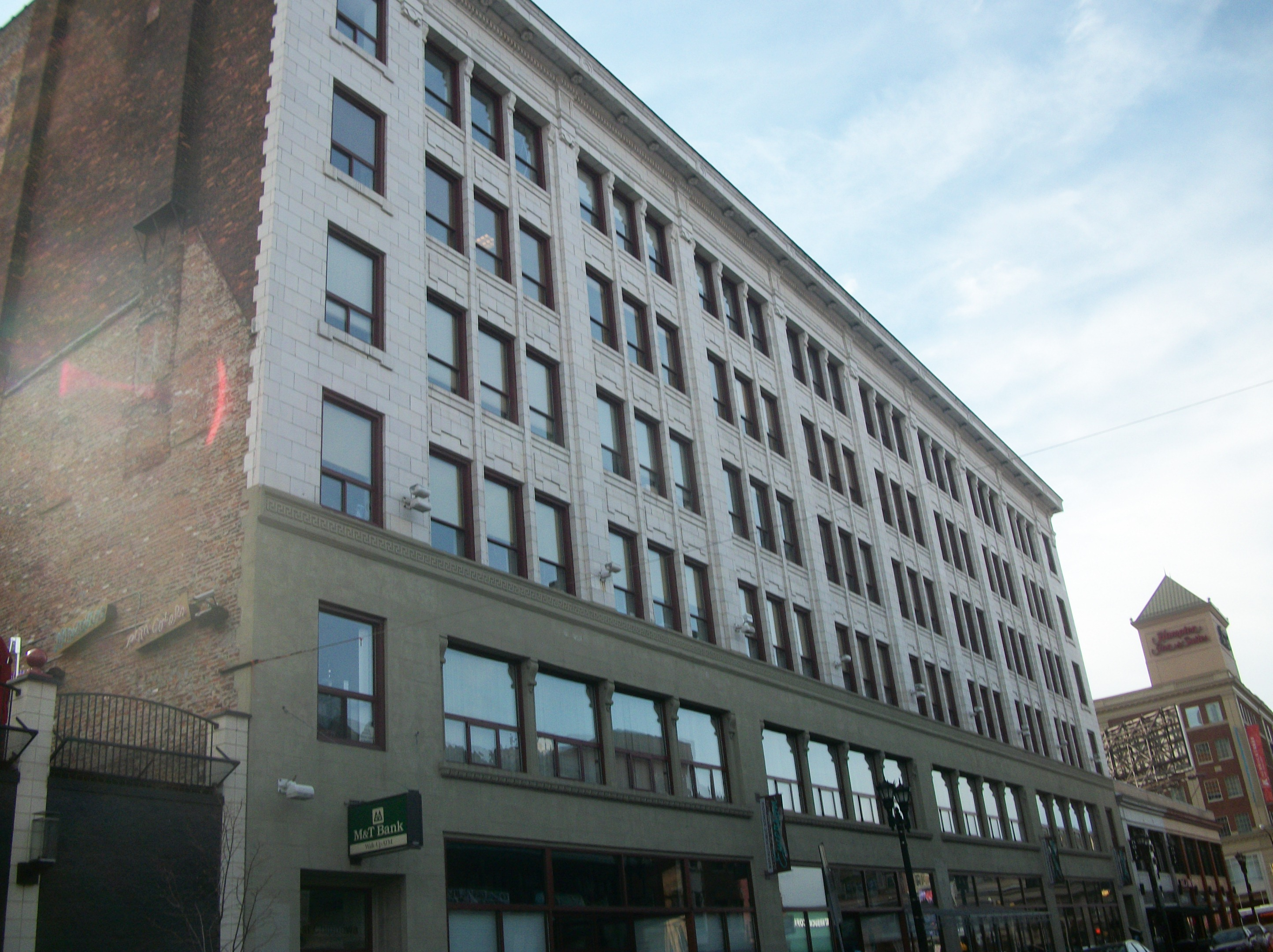

Location
- 70 West Chippewa; Downtown; Buffalo, Erie, New York 14202

Information
- School number: 302
- Grades: 9-12
- Team name: Eagles

== Alumni ==
- Willie Evans
