= Schiller Park, Buffalo =

Neighborhood in Buffalo, New York, United States of America

Coordinates: 42°54′44″N 78°48′22″W

Schiller Park is a neighborhood of easternmost Buffalo, New York, at the Cheektowaga border.

== Geography ==
The neighborhood centers on Schiller Park, a city park. East Delavan Avenue is its northern border and Broadway borders the south. The eastern boundary is East End Avenue, at the hamlet of Pine Hill, while Bailey Avenue marks the west. In between is the building that used to house Turner-Carroll High School. It is named after German playwright and poet Friedrich Schiller.
