= Buffalo Public School No. 57 =

- U.S. National Register of Historic Places
- New York State Register of Historic Places
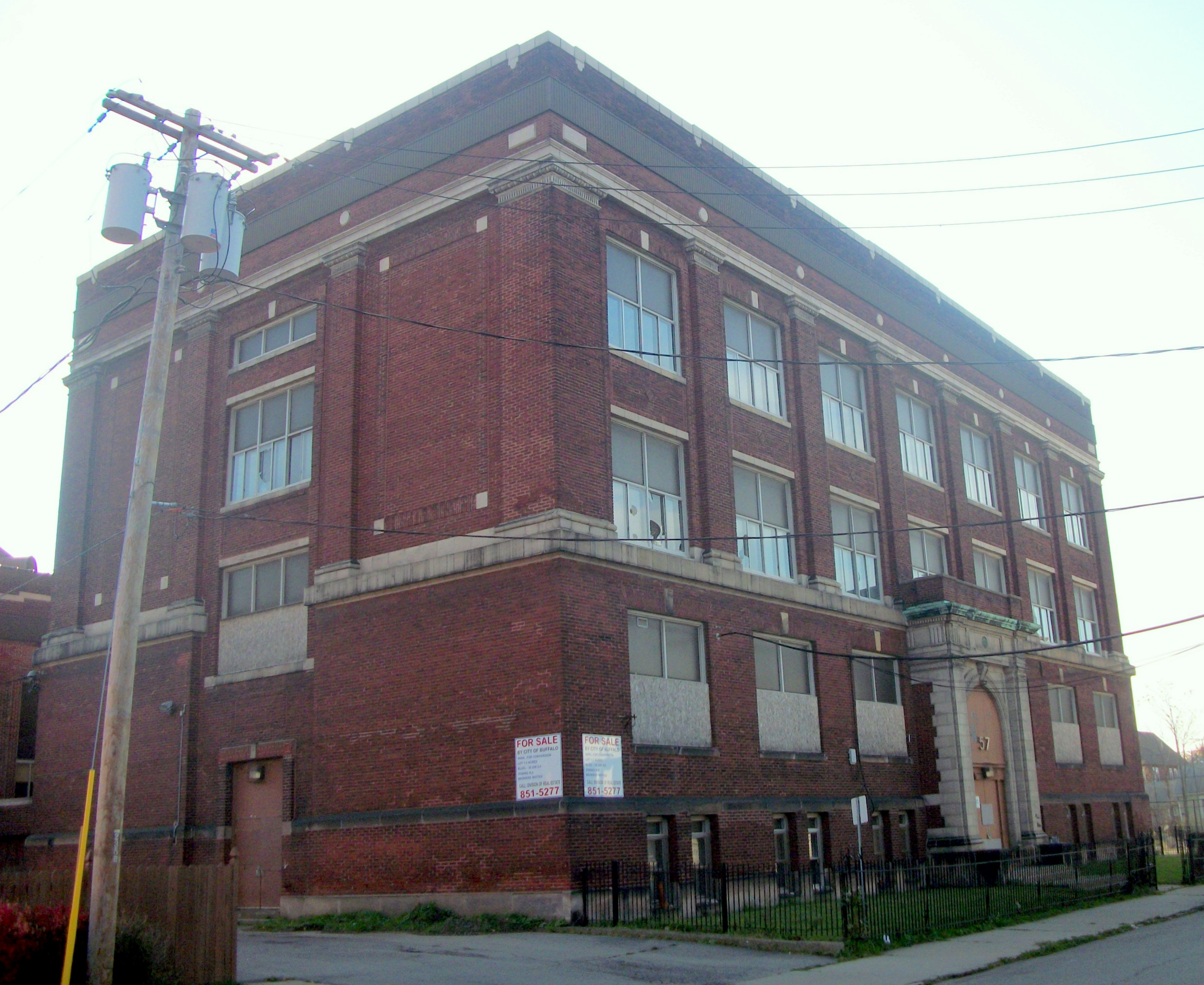
- Public School No. 57, October 2012

- Location within New York Location within the United States
- Location: 243 Sears Street, Buffalo, New York
- Coordinates: 42°53′36″N 78°50′08″W
- Area: 1.25 acres (0.51 ha)
- Built: 1914
- Architect: Carl G. Schmill
- Architectural style: Classical Revival
- NRHP reference No.: 100002736
- NYSRHP No.: 02940.005967

Significant dates
- Added to NRHP: July 27, 2018
- Designated NYSRHP: June 12, 2018

Buffalo Public School No. 57, also known as Broadway Village Elementary Community School, is a historic school building located in the Broadway-Fillmore neighborhood of Buffalo, Erie County, New York. It was built in 1914, and is a three-story, red brick building over a full basement with Classical Revival detailing. It is connected to a one-story auditorium building by a one-story hyphen. The building was originally constructed as an addition to the original 1897 Public School No. 57, which was demolished in 1960. The school has been redeveloped as a multi-use facility including apartments, offices, and a community center.

It was listed on the National Register of Historic Places in 2018.
