= Buffalo Public School No. 77 =

- U.S. National Register of Historic Places
- New York State Register of Historic Places
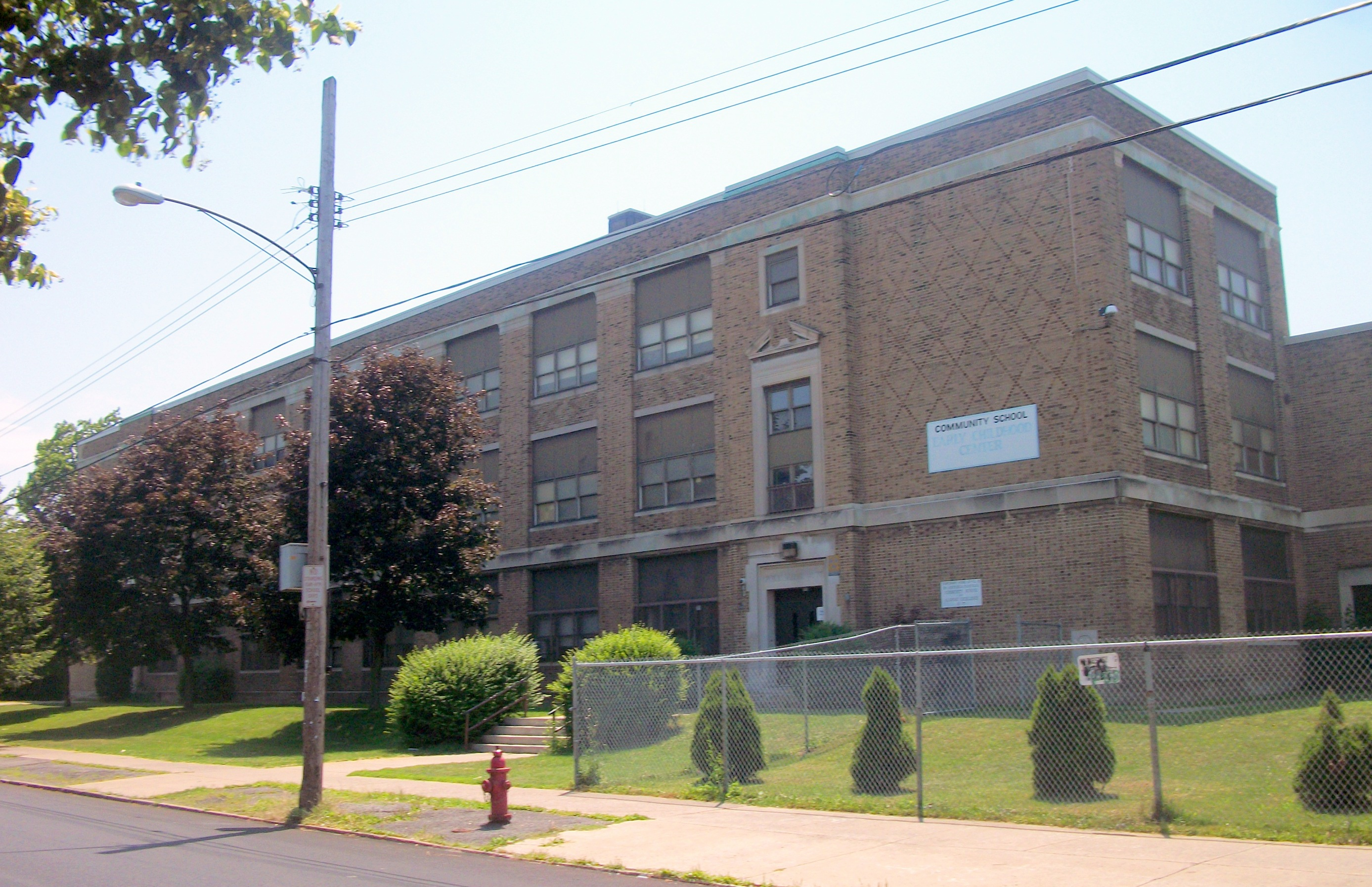
- Public School No. 77, July 2013

- Location within New York Location within the United States
- Location: 429 Plymouth Avenue, Buffalo, New York
- Coordinates: 42°54′33″N 78°53′31″W
- Area: 2.09 acres (0.85 ha)
- Built: 1927
- Architect: Ernest Crimi
- Architectural style: Classical Revival
- NRHP reference No.: 100001361
- NYSRHP No.: 02940.005965

Significant dates
- Added to NRHP: July 24, 2017
- Designated NYSRHP: May 19, 2017

Buffalo Public School No. 77 is a historic school building located in Buffalo, Erie County, New York. It was built in 1927, and is a three-story, rectangular, brick building with Classical Revival detailing. It has a courtyard plan with a double-height gymnasium at one end and a double-height auditorium at the other. The building is an example of a typical standardized public school plan developed by Ernest Crimi. The school building has been redeveloped as senior housing and a neighborhood community center.

It was listed on the National Register of Historic Places in 2017.
