= Buffalo Public School No. 44 =

- U.S. National Register of Historic Places
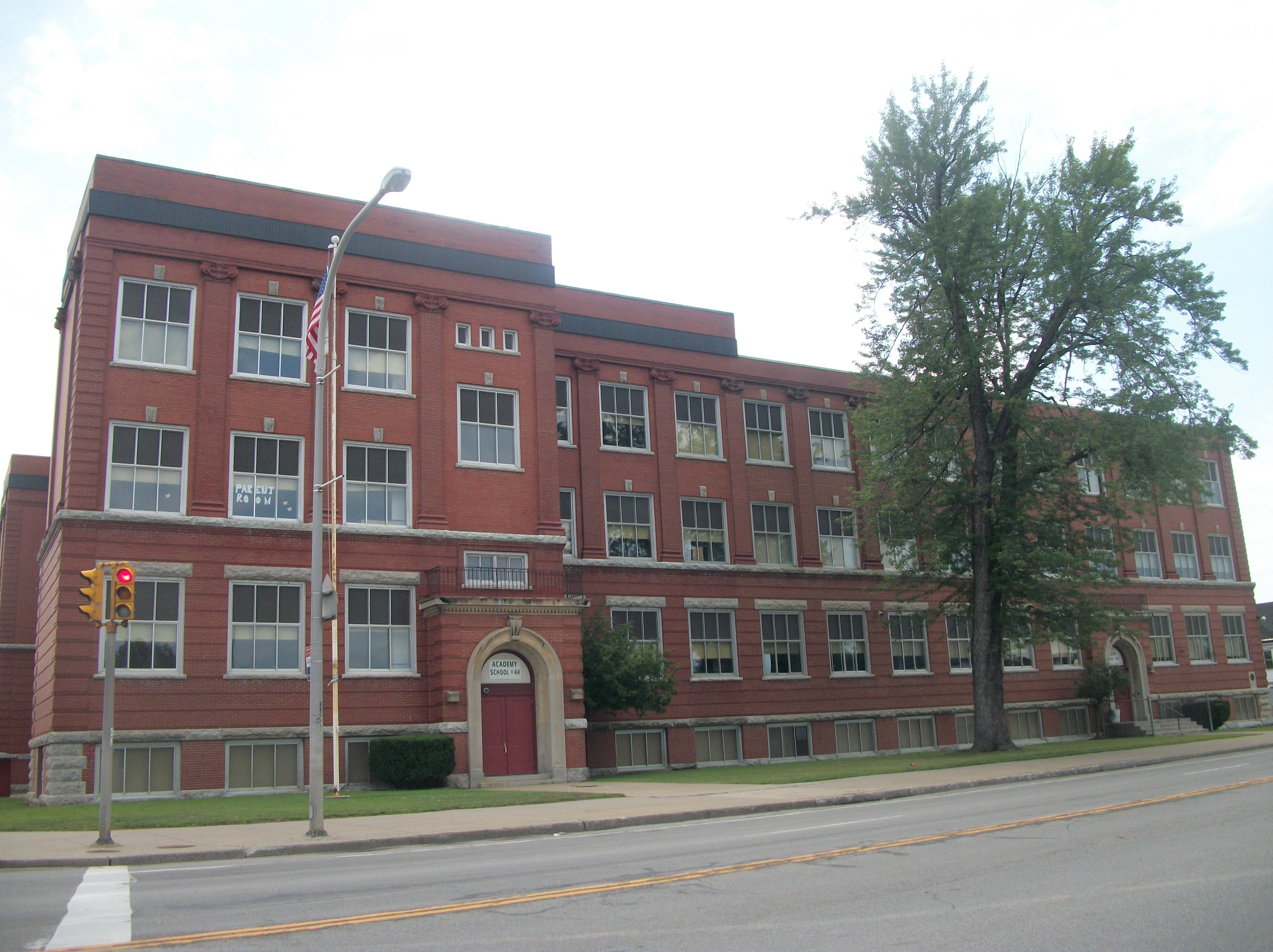
- Public School No. 44, July 2013

- Location within New York Location within the United States
- Location: 1369 Broadway, Buffalo, New York
- Coordinates: 42°53′46″N 78°49′27″W
- Area: 2.63 acres (1.06 ha)
- Built: 1907, 1930, 1975
- Architect: Howard L. Beck (1907), Ernest Crimi (1930)
- Architectural style: Renaissance Revival
- NRHP reference No.: 100002735
- Added to NRHP: July 27, 2018

Buffalo Public School No. 44, also known as Lincoln School, is a historic school building located on the East Side of Buffalo, New York, United States, once the city's Polish-American enclave. The original section was built in 1907, and is a three-story, red brick, E-shaped building with Renaissance Revival detailing. Major additions were made to the original building in 1930 and 1975. Architectural details include Onondaga limestone trim and Ionic pilasters with red terra cotta bases and capitals. The building reflects the evolution of standardized urban public school designs in the early 20th century.

It was listed on the National Register of Historic Places in 2018.
