= Kensington, Buffalo =

Coordinates: 42°56′17″N 78°48′49″W

- Neighbourhood
- Interactive map of Kensington, Buffalo
- Country: United States
- State: New York
- City: Buffalo

Kensington is a neighborhood of Buffalo, New York, located in the northeastern part of the city. It is sometimes referred to as Kensington-Bailey, due to the intersection at Kensington and Bailey Avenues, the two major commercial streets in the neighborhood.

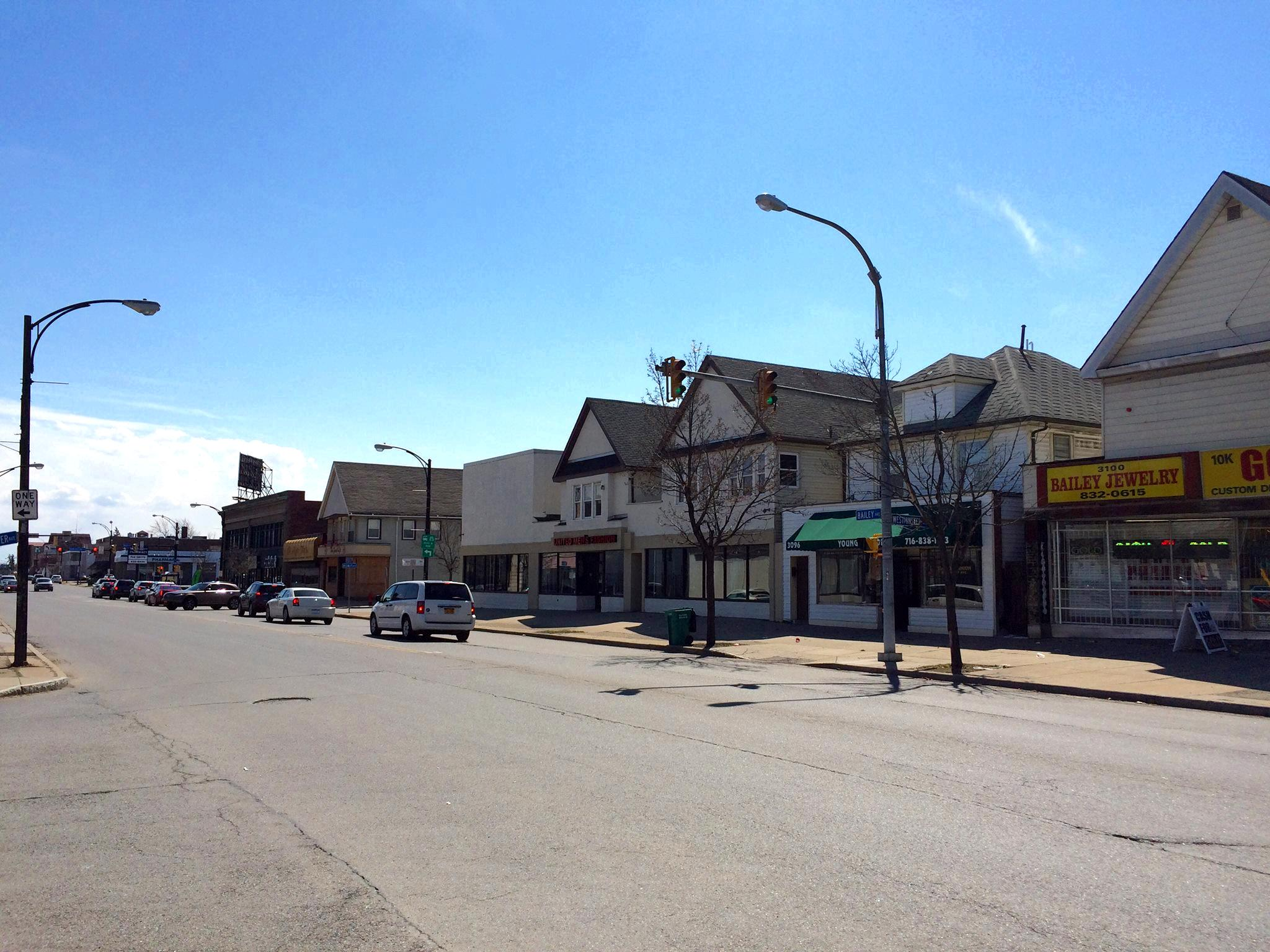
Looking south down Bailey Avenue from the corner of Westminster Avenue, toward Kensington Avenue.

== History ==
Throughout the 19th century, the current Kensington and Bailey areas were rural farms and timberland services. It wasn't until 1895 that the neighborhood became more urbanized, when Germans began to populate the area, mostly thanks to the construction of the Kensington Avenue street car line. After World War I, the district began seeing intensive private investment and development. During the 1920s, the population of Kensington doubled to 49,000. In addition, Italians and Poles began to populate the area. The Kensington-Bailey neighborhood would be separated into northern and southern halves in the 1950s when the Kensington Expressway was constructed through the middle of it.

== Geography ==
The neighborhood centers on the intersection of Kensington and Bailey Avenues, which also serve as the two busiest streets in the community. Winspear Avenue runs along the northern edge, Main Street is located to the west of the neighborhood, and East Delavan Avenue borders the south. The eastern boundary is Eggert Road and the hamlet of Cleveland Hill, New York.

== Notable places and events ==
- Kensington High School
- Burgard Vocational High School
- Sisters Hospital

== See also ==
- Neighborhoods of Buffalo, New York
