= Buffalo Public School No. 24 =

- U.S. National Register of Historic Places
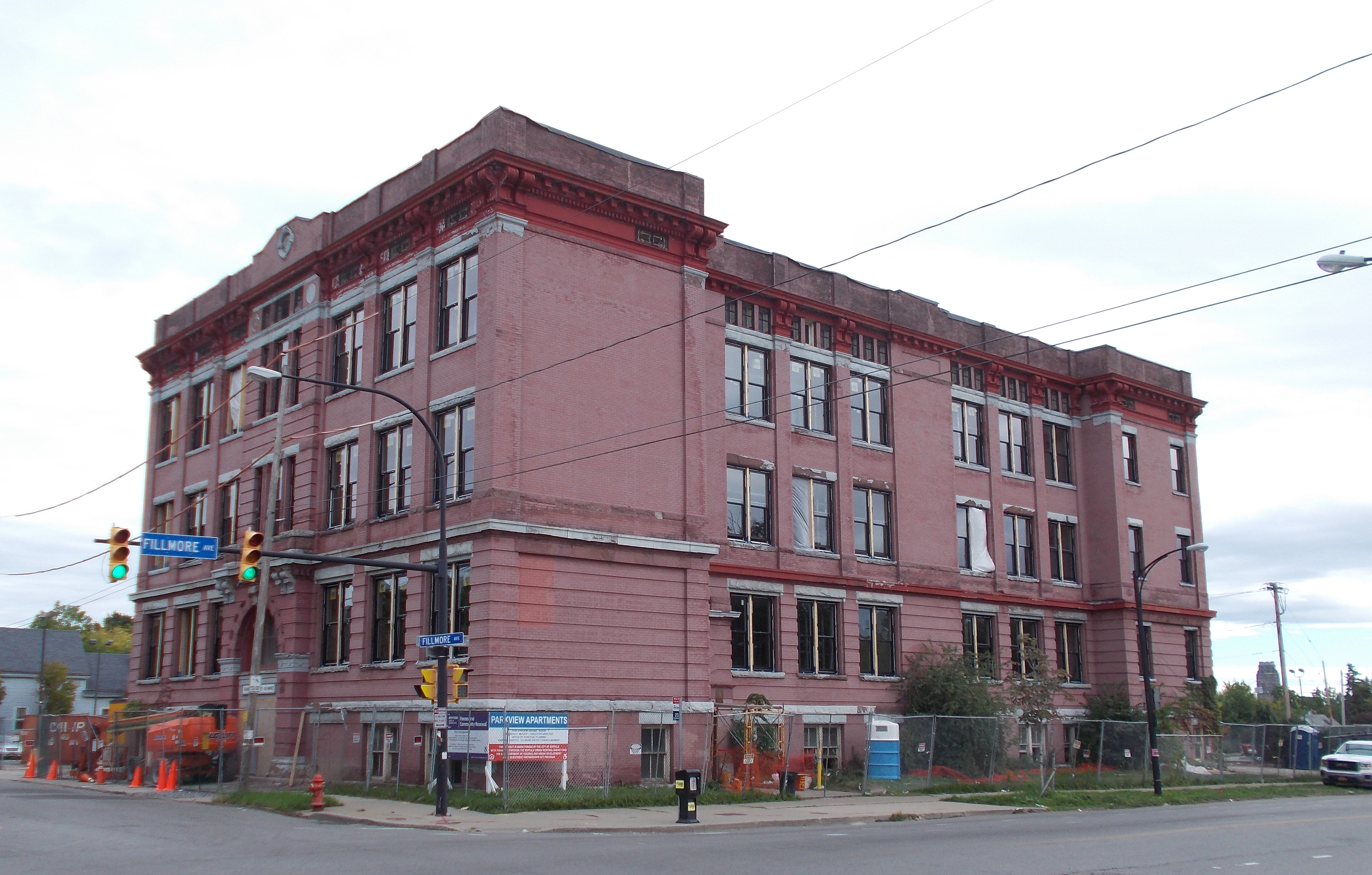
- Public School No. 24, September 2016

- Location within New York Location within the United States
- Location: 775 Best St., Buffalo, New York
- Coordinates: 42°54′12″N 78°50′21″W
- Area: 0.44 acres (0.18 ha)
- Built: 1901, 1960, 1965
- Architect: Charles Day Swan
- Architectural style: Renaissance Revival
- NRHP reference No.: 16000840
- Added to NRHP: December 13, 2016

Buffalo Public School No. 24, also known as Public School 59, is a historic school building located in the Broadway-Fillmore neighborhood of Buffalo, Erie County, New York. The original section was built in 1901, and is a three-story, seven-bay, I-shaped, red brick building over a raised basement with Renaissance Revival detailing. The building incorporates sandstone, terra cotta, and pressed metal details. It was the first school to offer special education within the City of Buffalo school system. The school has been redeveloped as an apartment building.

It was listed on the National Register of Historic Places in 2016.
