= Cold Springs, Buffalo =

Neighborhood in Buffalo, New York, United States

- Neighborhood
- Location in New York State Location in the United States
- Coordinates: 42°54′58″N 78°51′27″W
- Country: United States
- State: New York
- County: Erie
- City: Buffalo

Cold Springs is a neighborhood in Buffalo, New York.

== Geography ==
Cold Springs is a smaller neighborhood within the larger East Side of Buffalo. Its western boundary is Main Street, northern is East Delavan Avenue, East is Jefferson Avenue, and the Southern is East Utica Street.

== Notable places ==
- Buffalo Academy for Visual and Performing Arts

== See also ==
- Neighborhoods of Buffalo, New York
