= Burgard Vocational High School =

Location
- 400 Kensington Ave; Buffalo, New York 14214; United States; 42°55′44.14″N 78°50′10.61″W

Information
- Type: Public, vocational school
- Established: 1910
- School district: Buffalo Public Schools
- School number: 301
- NCES School ID: 360585000301
- Principal: Eric Johnson
- Teaching staff: 47.83 (on an FTE basis)
- Grades: 9-12
- Enrollment: 502 (2024-2025)
- Student to teacher ratio: 10.50
- Campus: City: Large
- Colors: Blue and White
- Mascot: Bulldogs
- Newspaper: The Blueprint
- Yearbook: Craftsman
- Website: www.buffaloschools.org/o/ps301

Burgard Vocational High School is a vocational high school located in Buffalo, New York, USA. It enrolls approximately 600 students from Grades 9 - 12 and teaches according to the Board of Regents. The current principal is Eric Johnson.

== History ==
The school was founded in 1910 as a combined printing class between Public School #5 and Public School #44 on Elm Street in Buffalo. In 1914, it became known as the Elm Technical School. A $1,000,000 construction project was begun to construct a new facility for the school, with the land being donated by Henry P. Burgard.

In 2009, a renovation was completed on the school that expanded the main office and created new science and computer labs, technology shops, and renovation to the automobile shops. While the school was being reconstructed, freshmen and sophomores were housed at School 171 on East Delavan Avenue.

== Academics ==
Burgard offers Regents level courses as required by New York State. Burgard's curriculum includes a career and technical component in classes such as Automotive Repair Technology, Virtual Enterprise, Welding, Computer-aided design (CAD) & CAM Robotics, and Building Management.

== Notable alumni ==
- Joseph Christopher; serial killer known as the ".22 Caliber Killer"
- Andre Coleman – former professional football player with the San Diego Chargers and Edmonton Eskimos (Class of 2002)
- Al Dekdebrun
