= Buffalo Alternative High School =

Coordinates: 42°53′42.5″N 78°49′26.9″W

Academy School 131
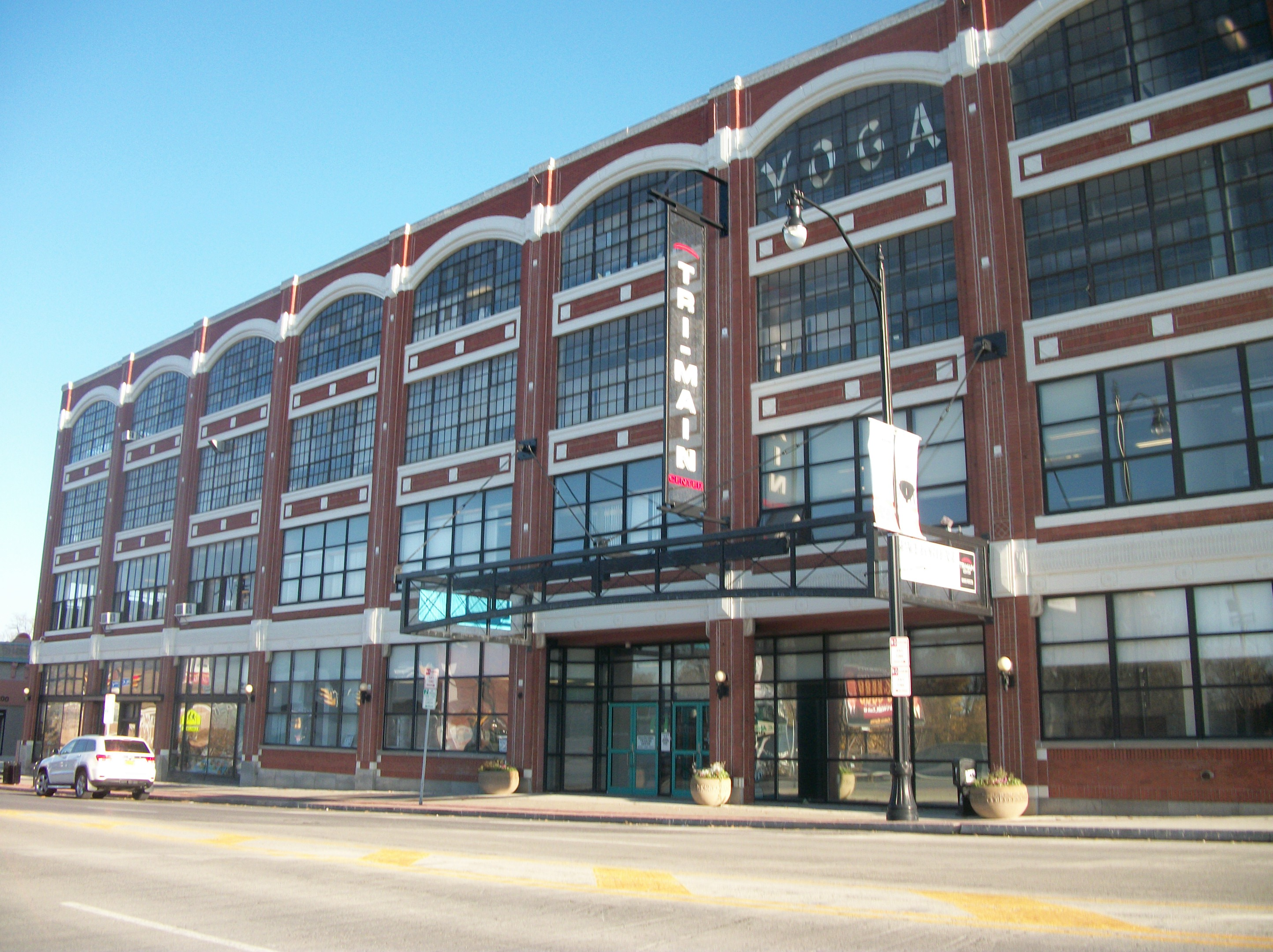

Location
- 756 St Lawrence Ave; North Park; Buffalo, Erie, New York 14216

Information
- School number: 131
- Principal: Casey Young-Welch
- Grades: 7-12
- Website: Academy School

The Academy School 131 (also known as Alternative High School) is an alternative school located in Buffalo, New York. It has gone through two separate eras, and was located at 268 Oak Street in Downtown Buffalo. The original Buffalo Alternative High School was closed in 2003 due to budget cuts, with a new alternative high school program being re-opened in Buffalo in 2006.

== History ==
Buffalo Alternative was created in 1975 to house students who were disruptive, chronically suspended, young parents, otherwise unsuccessful in the traditional school setting. The main campus (or "Center School") was at 280 Oak Street (formerly the home to Boys Vocational High School), along with several satellite sites were established in instances of overcrowding and also to offer more specialized programs. The satellite sites included the "City-As-School" program at 320 Porter Avenue, home of an internship program for Alternative High students, the Fulton Bilingual Program at 220 Fulton Street for bilingual students, and the Fulton Junior High Program for junior high school students. Students who met criterion were allowed to either return to the traditional high school setting or graduate from Alternative High.

The school's facilities were lacking due to budgetary reasons, and the school was finally closed in 2003. Academy School 131 was created in 2006 to serve as the alternative program in Buffalo. Currently, the Oak Street campus serves as a combination of office space for the City of Buffalo as well as residential apartments.

The new alternative program (known as The Academy School) began in 2006 and was originally operated through a firm called Resultech and was located at former School 44 1369 Broadway. The Resultech partnership was dissolved in 2008 due to backlash from administrators and students.

The school began with two campuses, one at Public School 44 at 1369 Broadway Street for grades 9-12, and the other at 1409 East Delevan Avenue for grades 1–8. In 2011, the elementary program was moved to School 40 in Babcock. The high school program was moved to School 4 on South Park Avenue in 2014, with grades 1-8 moving in shortly thereafter. In Fall 2017, Grades 7 and 8 moved to the former School 18 Annex on the city's West Side but returned to School 4 the next year. Academy School moved to the Tri-Main Center in North Buffalo for the 2020-2021 school year.

== Gallery ==
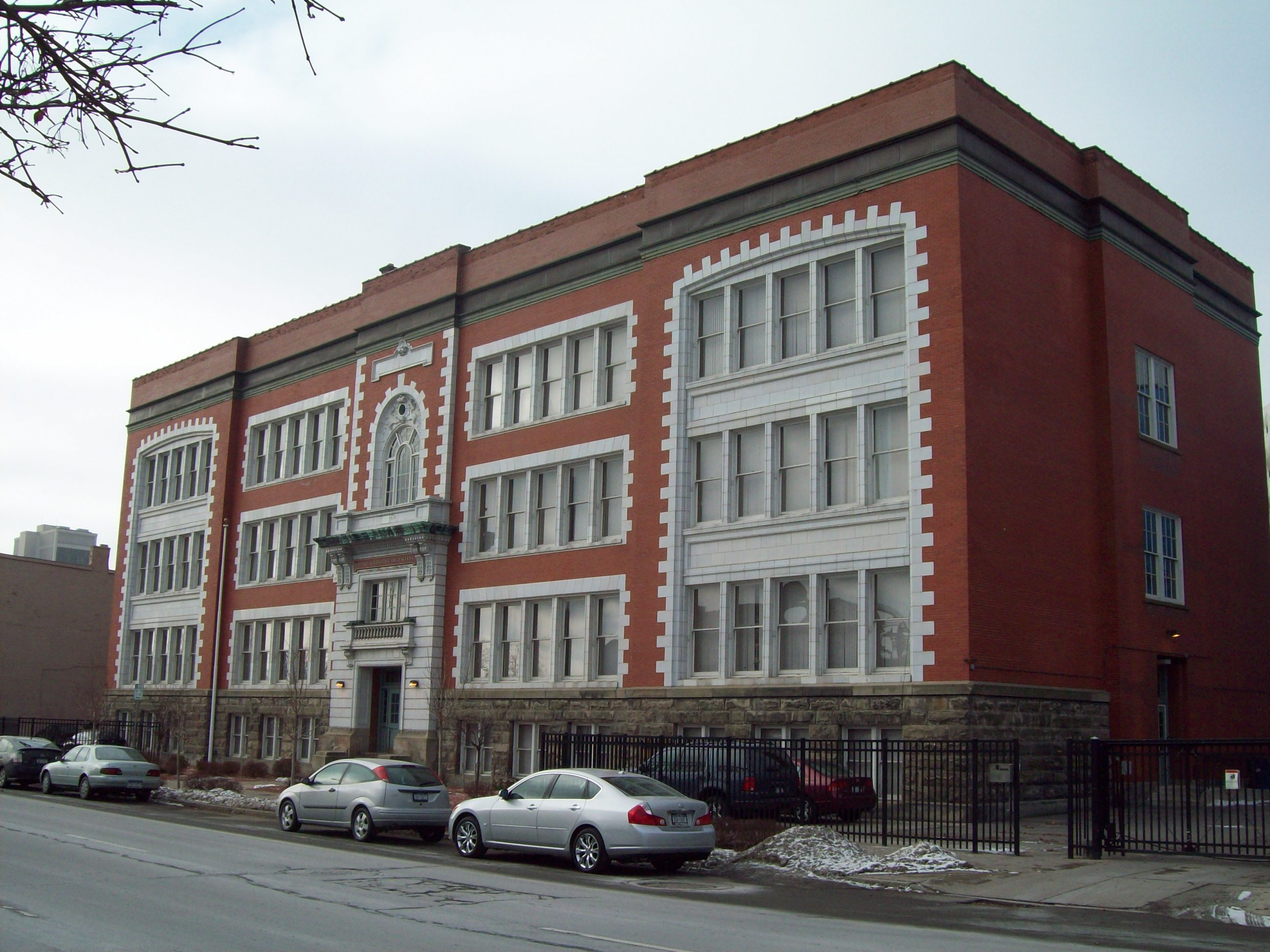
School 13, where Buffalo Alternative was housed from 1975 to 2003.

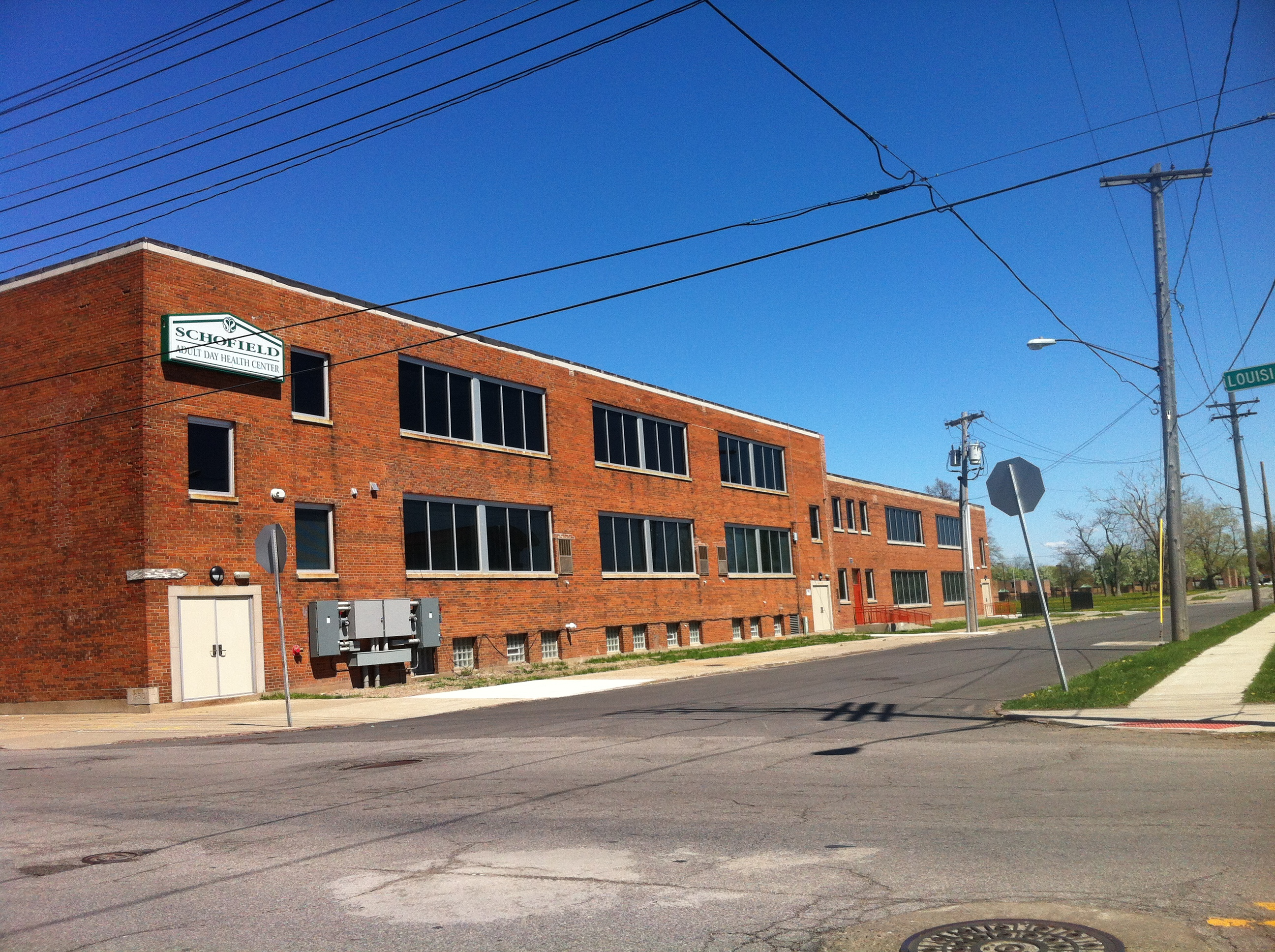
School 142, where the Fulton Bilingual/Junior High programs were housed.

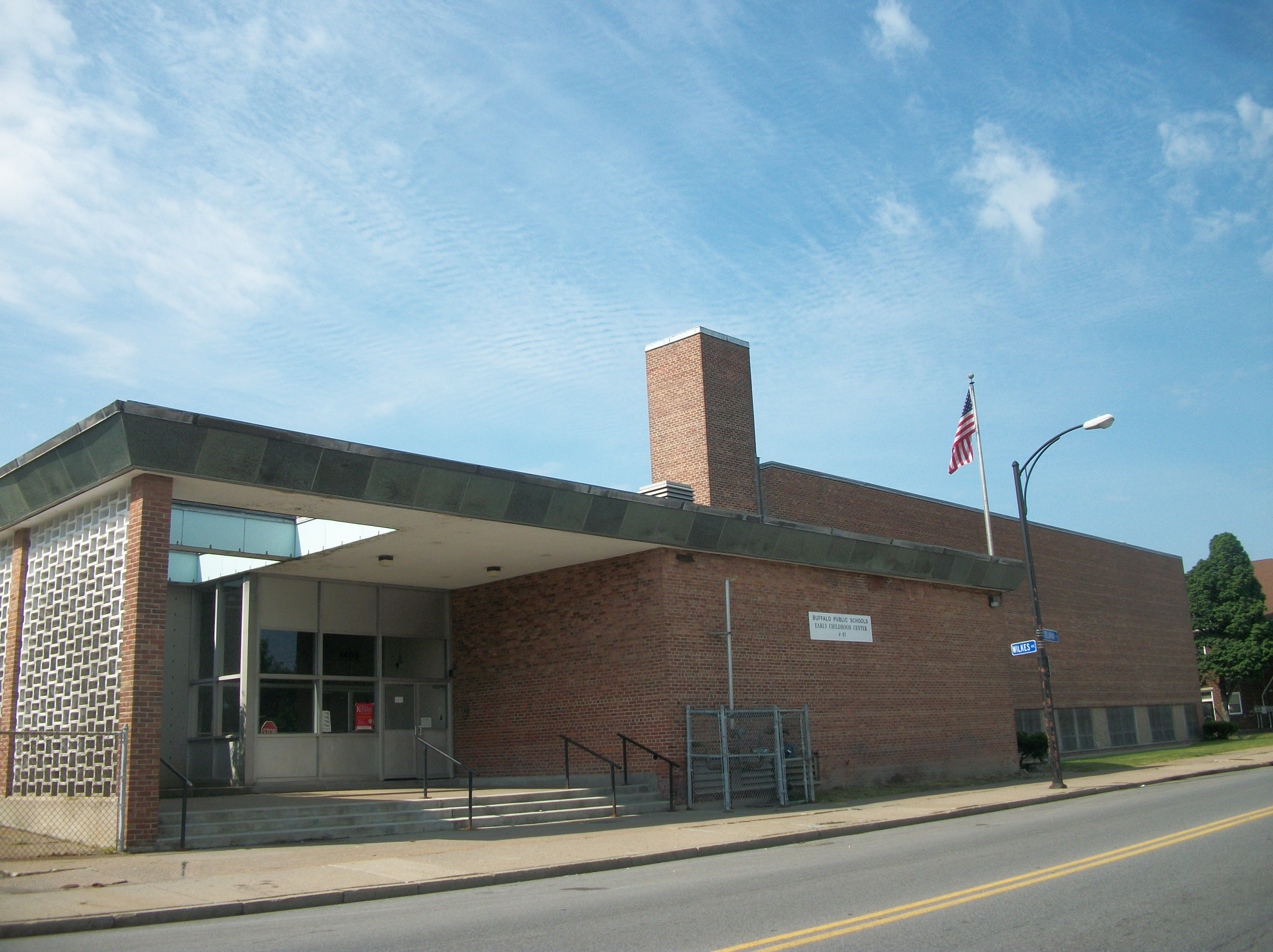
School 171, where Academy School was housed from 2009 to 2011.

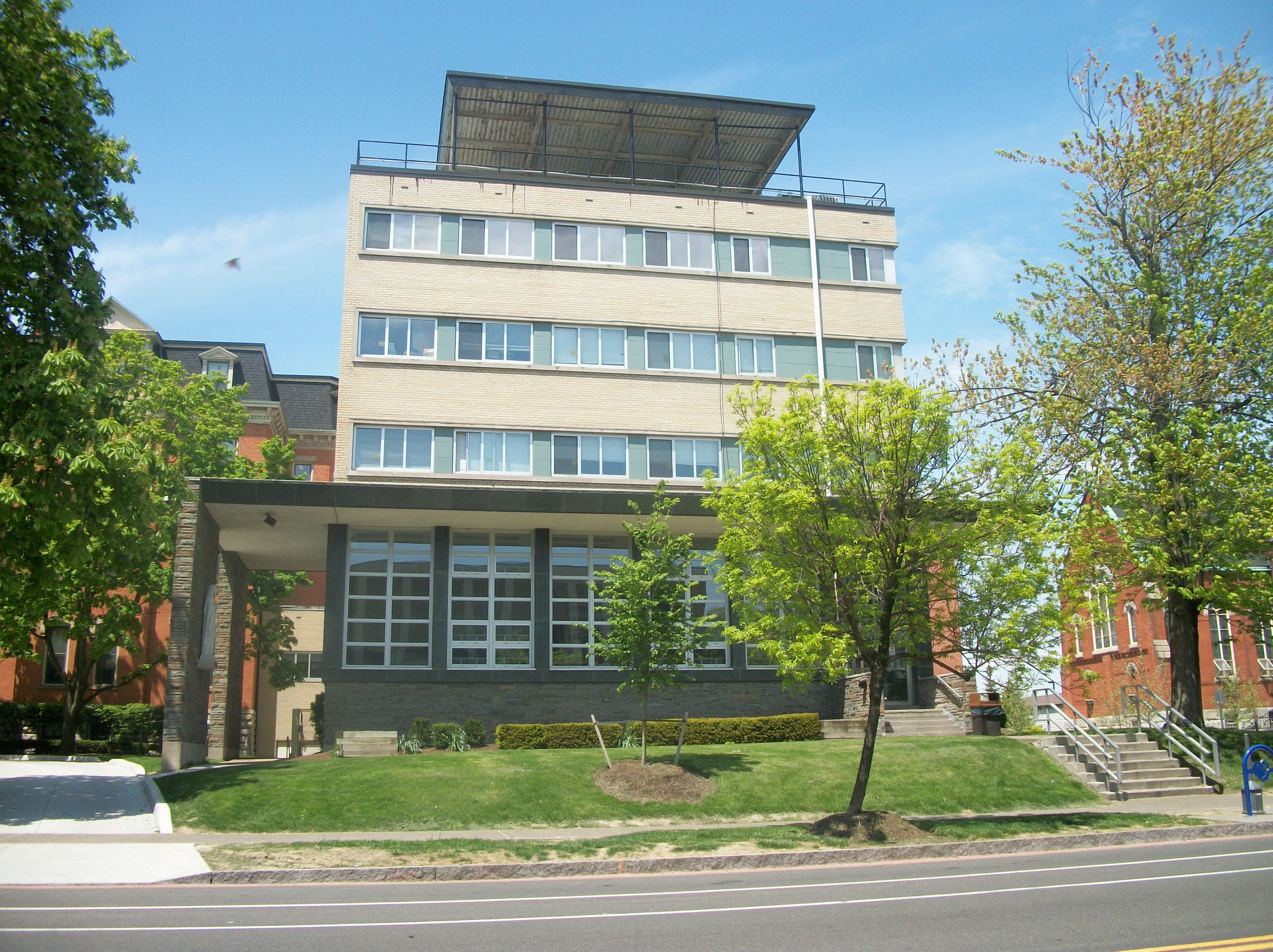
320 Porter Avenue, where the City-As-School program was housed.

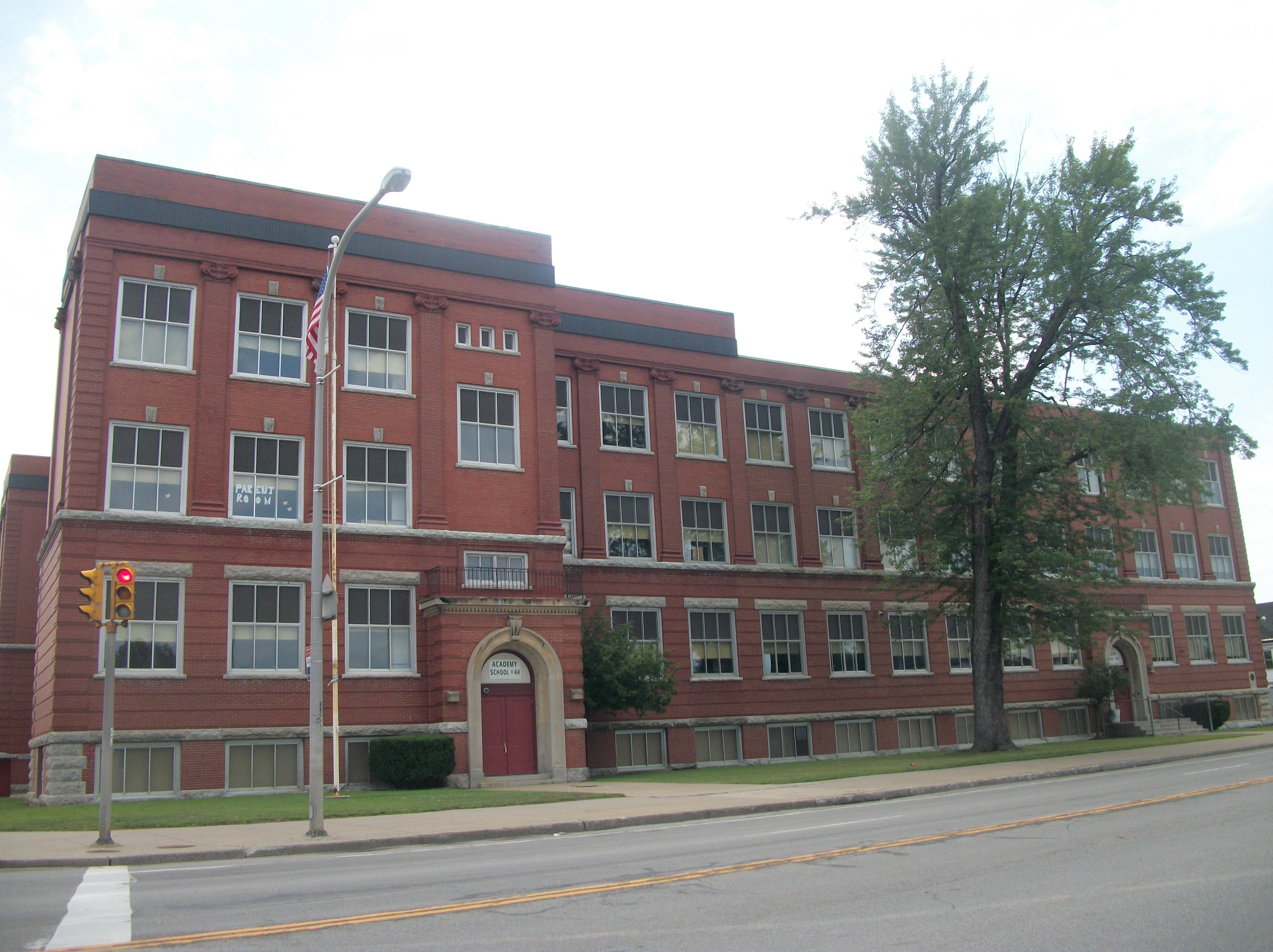
School 44, where the Academy Program was housed from 2006 to 2013.

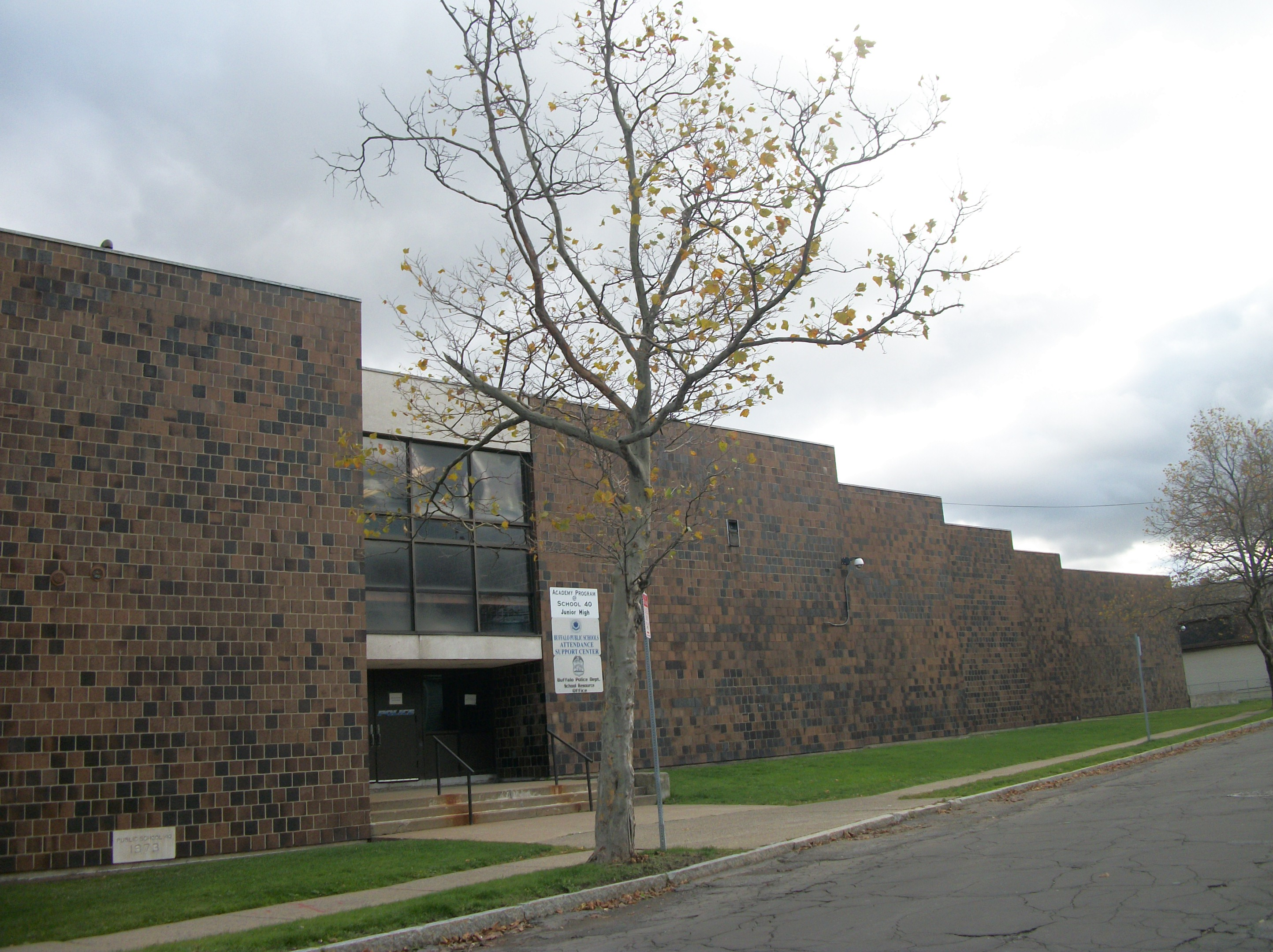
School 40, where the Academy Program was housed from 2011 to 2015.

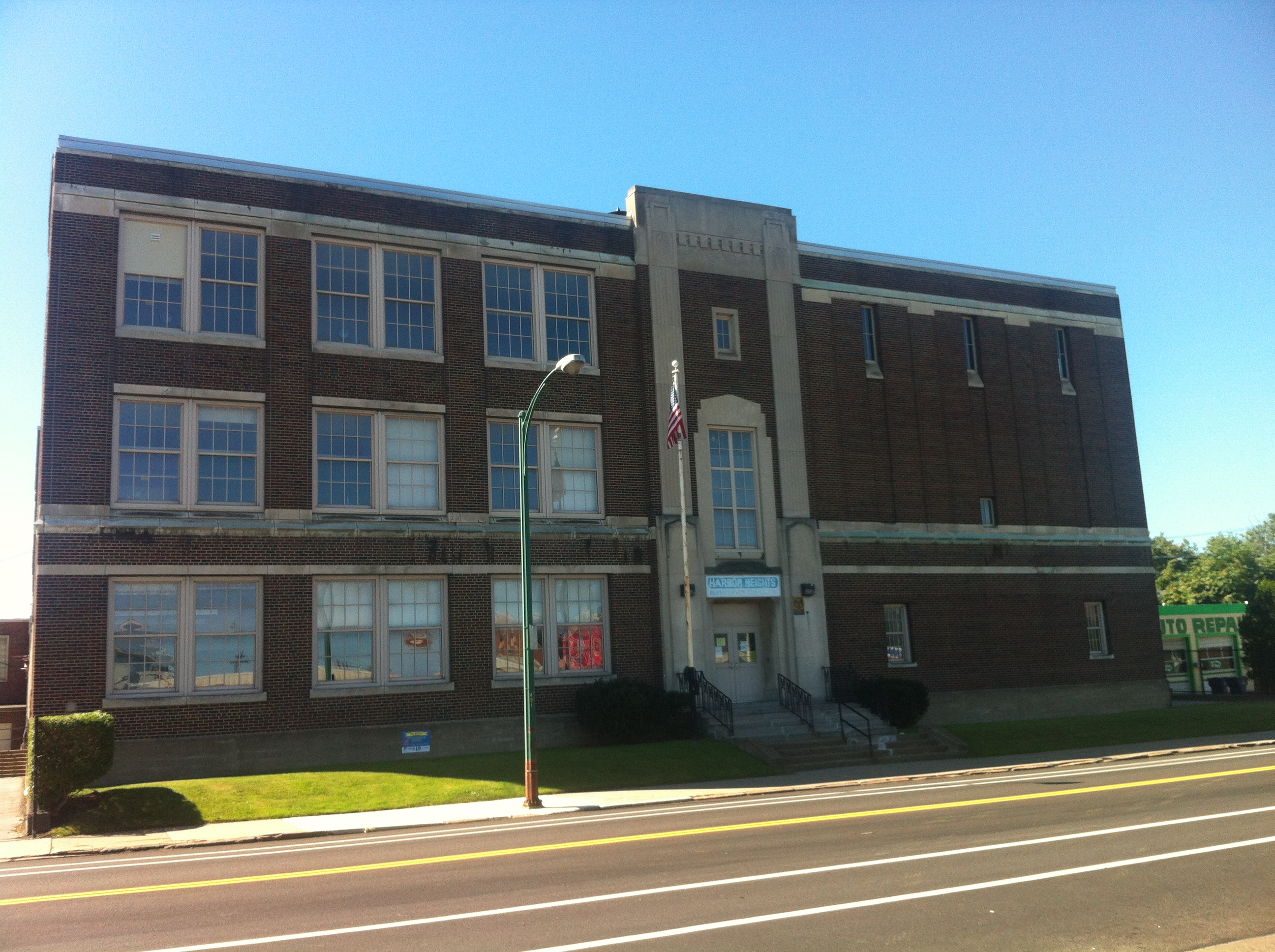
School 4, where the Academy School was housed from 2015 to 2020.
