= New York State Public High School Athletic Association Boys Basketball Championships =

Basketball Championships

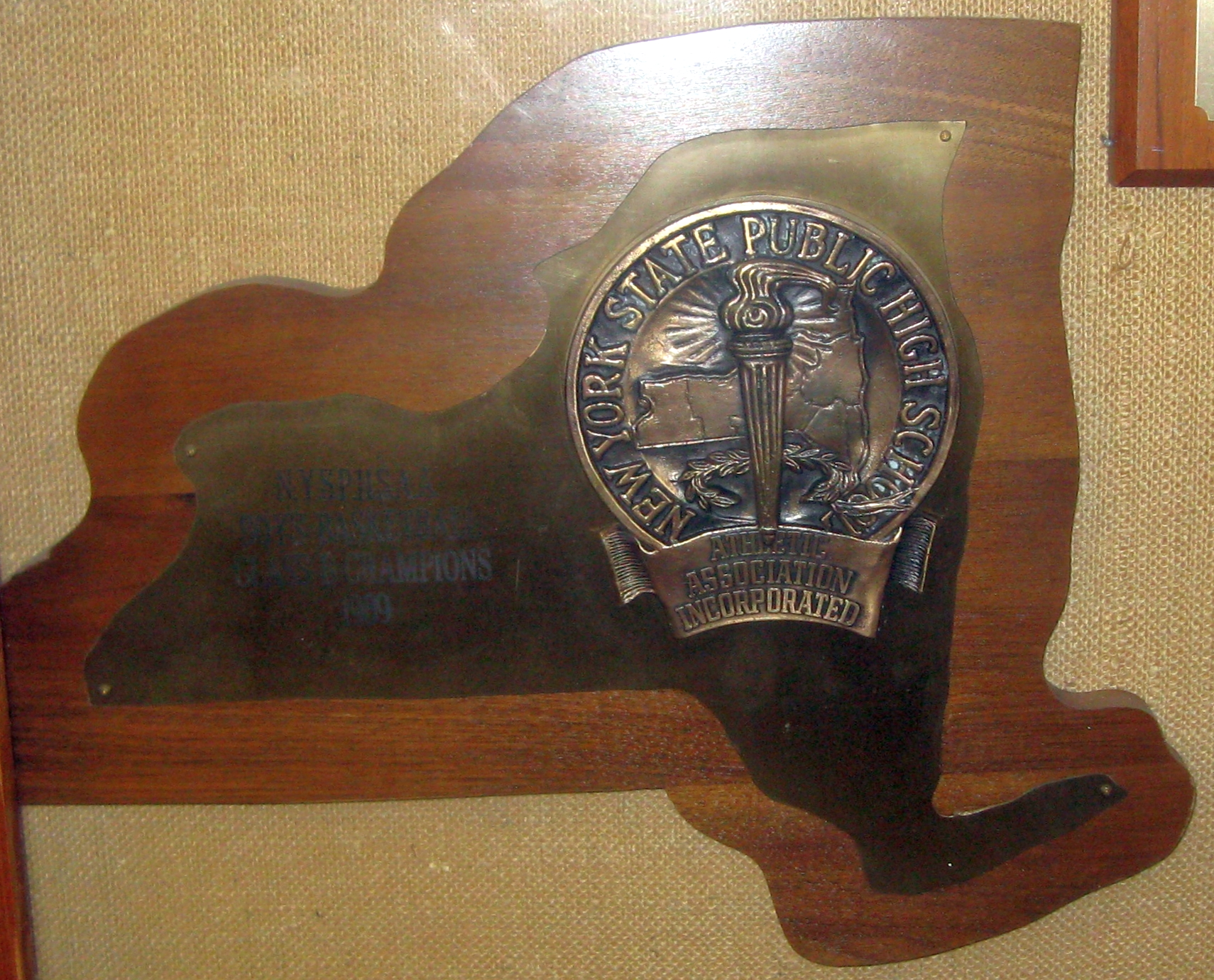
1989 basketball championship trophy in East Hampton, New York

The New York State Public High School Athletic Association (NYSPHSAA) Boys Basketball Championships are held annually to determine the champions of public high schools outside of New York City, though some catholic and independent schools are members as well. The championship games are held each March. After 36 years in Glens Falls at the Glens Falls Civic Center, the championships are held in Binghamton at Floyd L. Maines Veterans Memorial Arena.

The winners of the Class AA, A and B tournaments then compete for the state title in a tournament, called the Federation Tournament of Champions, against the champions of the Catholic High School Athletic Association (CHSAA), the New York State Association of Independent Schools Athletic Association (NYSAISAA), and the Public Schools Athletic League (PSAL) (public schools in New York City). The Federation Tournament of Champions returned to Glens Falls at the Glens Falls Civic Center beginning in March 2017.

== Early history ==
The earliest high school boys' state championship in New York was held in 1921 as a single-class tournament. The tournament continued as a one-classification competition through 1929, then as a two-classification (A and B) competition from 1930 through 1932. After the 1932 tournament, the NYSPHSAA voted against continuing the competition. According to Alton Doyle, the executive director of the NYSPHSAA from 1975 to 1990, there were many violations of the rules on eligibility, with some schools using overage students, and gambling was widespread. The state tournament was believed to be a cause of such problems, leading to the decision to eliminate the tournament.

Regional tournaments continued over the years without any overall state championship. From 1974 through 1977, various inter-sectional, regional and inter-class post-season tournaments were held. In 1976, the state legislature passed a bill to authorize a state tournament, which began in 1978.

== Sections and classifications ==
Winners of each section compete in the NYSPHSAA tournament, by size classification, for the NYSPHSAA state championship. There are 11 sections, as follows:

- Section 1: Dutchess, Putnam, Rockland, Westchester Counties
- Section 2: Capital District
- Section 3: Central New York
- Section 4: Southern Tier
- Section 5: Genesee Valley
- Section 6: Western New York
- Section 7: Champlain Area
- Section 8: Nassau County
- Section 9: Orange, Sullivan, Ulster Counties
- Section 10: St. Lawrence Area
- Section 11: Suffolk County

Each section is further divided into classes, by school enrollment size. The classes are, from largest schools to smallest, AA, A, B, C, and D. For 2015, the classification enrollment cutoffs were as follows, counting the number of 9th, 10th and 11th grade students in the previous scholastic year (enrollment is doubled for all-boys schools):

- Class AA: 910 and more
- Class A: 480-909
- Class B: 280-479
- Class C: 170-279
- Class D: 169 and fewer

A school may elect to play in a higher classification, but may not elect to play in a lower classification.

== Winners and runners-up ==
Winners and runners-up of the single-classification tournament from 1921 through 1929 were:

| Year | Venue | Winner | Runner-up | W score | RU score |
|---|---|---|---|---|---|
| 1921 | Syracuse University | Poughkeepsie | Sherrill | 29 | 18 |
| 1922 | Syracuse University | Syracuse Central | East (Rochester) | 25 | 19 |
| 1923 | Syracuse University | Port Chester | Masten Park (Buffalo) | 18 | 14 |
| 1924 | Syracuse University | Lafayette (Buffalo) | Lansingburgh | 29 | 18 |
| 1925 | Syracuse University | Lafayette (Buffalo) | Patchogue | 22 | 16 |
| 1926 | Syracuse University | Elmira Free Academy | Kenmore (Tonawanda) | 26 | 24 |
| 1927 | Broadway Auditorium | Yonkers | Elmira Free Academy | 30 | 16 |
| 1928 | Troy | Syracuse Central | Fosdick-Masten Park (Buffalo) | 30 | 16 |
| 1929 | Syracuse University | Albany | Fosdick-Masten Park (Buffalo) | 25 | 19 |

Winners and runners-up of the two-classification tournament from 1930 through 1932 were:

| Year | Venue | Class | Winner | Runner-Up | W Score | RU Score | OTs |
|---|---|---|---|---|---|---|---|
| 1930 | Syracuse University | A | Little Falls | Cohoes | 25 | 9 | |
| 1930 | Syracuse University | B | Mineville | Margaretville | 38 | 28 | |
| 1931 | Syracuse University | A | Yonkers | Oswego | 34 | 18 | |
| 1931 | Syracuse University | B | Cornwall | Chautauqua | 38 | 28 | |
| 1932 | Syracuse University | A | Yonkers | Johnson City | 34 | 18 | 1 |
| 1932 | Syracuse University | B | Sherrill | East Islip | 33 | 15 | |

Venues of the current, multi-classification tournament:

| Year(s) | City | Arena |
|---|---|---|
| 1978–1980 | Rochester | Rochester Community War Memorial |
| 1981–2016 | Glens Falls | Glens Falls Civic Center |
| 2017–2019; 2022–2023 | Binghamton | Floyd L. Maines Veterans Memorial Arena |
| 2024 | Glens Falls | Cool Insuring Arena |
| 2025–present | Binghamton | Visions Veterans Memorial Arena |

Results of the current, multi-classification tournament, through 2025:

| Year | Class | Winner | Sec | Runner-Up | Sec | W Score | RU Score | OTs |
|---|---|---|---|---|---|---|---|---|
| 1978 | AAA | Mount Vernon | 1 | Kenmore West (Tonawanda) | 6 | 82 | 52 | |
| 1978 | AA | Niskayuna | 2 | Jamesville-DeWitt | 3 | 75 | 55 | |
| 1978 | A | Notre Dame (Elmira) | 4 | Roosevelt | 8 | 85 | 67 | |
| 1978 | B | Schuylerville | 2 | Bloomfield | 5 | 70 | 68 | 3 |
| 1978 | C | Pierson (Sag Harbor) | 11 | Alexander Hamilton (Elmsford) | 1 | 71 | 68 | 1 |
| 1978 | D | Bridgehampton | 11 | Lyme | 3 | 73 | 70 | |
| 1979 | AAA | Mount Vernon | 1 | Rush-Henrietta Sperry | 5 | 63 | 56 | |
| 1979 | AA | Lackawanna | 6 | Scarsdale | 1 | 57 | 55 | 3 |
| 1979 | A | Malverne | 8 | Albertus Magnus (Bardonia) | 1 | 55 | 52 | |
| 1979 | B | Sidney | 4 | Mattituck | 11 | 65 | 56 | |
| 1979 | C | Cuba | 5 | Alexander Hamilton (Elmsford) | 1 | 64 | 51 | |
| 1979 | D | Bridgehampton | 11 | Argyle | 2 | 59 | 50 | |
| 1980 | A | Ward Melville (East Setauket) | 11 | Union-Endicott | 4 | 56 | 51 | |
| 1980 | B | Bellport | 11 | Rush-Henrietta Roth | 5 | 63 | 61 | |
| 1980 | C | Lyons | 5 | Hastings (Hastings-on-Hudson) | 1 | 81 | 65 | |
| 1980 | D | Bridgehampton | 11 | Oppenheim-Ephratah | 3 | 71 | 70 | |
| 1981 | A | Mount Vernon | 1 | Arcadia (Greece) | 5 | 74 | 66 | |
| 1981 | B | Malverne | 8 | McKinley (Buffalo) | 6 | 62 | 54 | |
| 1981 | C | Wyandanch | 11 | Emerson (Buffalo) | 6 | 72 | 70 | |
| 1981 | D | Tuckahoe | 1 | New York Mills | 3 | 73 | 71 | |
| 1982 | A | Spring Valley | 9 | Bishop Ludden (Syracuse) | 3 | 85 | 68 | |
| 1982 | B | Nottingham (Syracuse) | 3 | Catskill | 2 | 45 | 43 | |
| 1982 | C | Wyandanch | 11 | Lyons | 5 | 68 | 65 | |
| 1982 | D | New York Mills | 3 | Tuckahoe | 1 | 82 | 77 | |
| 1983 | A | North Babylon | 11 | Union-Endicott | 4 | 69 | 43 | |
| 1983 | B | Charlotte (Rochester) | 5 | Wyandanch | 11 | 88 | 57 | |
| 1983 | C | Bennett (Buffalo) | 6 | Burke Catholic (Goshen) | 9 | 88 | 61 | |
| 1983 | D | Brookfield Central | 3 | St. Patrick's (Catskill) | 2 | 40 | 38 | |
| 1984 | A | Sweet Home (Amherst) | 6 | Long Beach | 8 | 51 | 50 | |
| 1984 | B | Bennett (Buffalo) | 6 | Catskill | 2 | 82 | 81 | 1 |
| 1984 | C | Charlotte (Rochester) | 5 | Coleman Catholic (Hurley) | 9 | 74 | 60 | |
| 1984 | D | Bridgehampton | 11 | Greenwood | 5 | 49 | 47 | |
| 1985 | A | Binghamton | 4 | Mount Vernon | 1 | 73 | 59 | |
| 1985 | B | Westbury | 8 | Lackawanna | 6 | 65 | 60 | |
| 1985 | C | Wheatley (Old Westbury) | 8 | Wilson (Rochester) | 5 | 68 | 55 | |
| 1985 | D | Bishop Cunningham (Oswego) | 3 | Bridgehampton | 11 | 69 | 65 | 1 |
| 1986 | A | Binghamton | 4 | Hempstead | 8 | 64 | 50 | |
| 1986 | B | Manhasset | 8 | Elmira Free Academy | 4 | 62 | 56 | |
| 1986 | C | Wilson Magnet (Rochester) | 5 | James I. O'Neill (Highland Falls) | 9 | 78 | 72 | |
| 1986 | D | Bridgehampton | 11 | Newfield (Tompkins) | 4 | 94 | 57 | |
| 1987 | A | Shenendehowa (Clifton Park) | 2 | Bishop Ludden (Syracuse) | 3 | 69 | 52 | |
| 1987 | B | Nottingham (Syracuse) | 3 | South Side (Rockville Centre) | 8 | 76 | 67 | |
| 1987 | C | Trott Vocational (Niagara Falls) | 6 | Center Moriches | 11 | 71 | 61 | |
| 1987 | D | Alexander Hamilton (Elmsford) | 1 | Cuba | 5 | 74 | 50 | |
| 1988 | A | McQuaid Jesuit (Rochester) | 5 | Liverpool | 3 | 77 | 67 | |
| 1988 | B | La Salle (Niagara Falls) | 6 | Nottingham (Syracuse) | 3 | 79 | 75 | 1 |
| 1988 | C | Stillwater | 2 | Malverne | 8 | 78 | 67 | |
| 1988 | D | Alexander Hamilton (Elmsford) | 1 | Sugar Loaf (Chester) | 9 | 92 | 83 | |
| 1989 | A | Hempstead | 8 | La Salle (Niagara Falls) | 6 | 77 | 63 | |
| 1989 | B | East Hampton | 11 | Rye | 1 | 57 | 53 | |
| 1989 | C | Lyons | 5 | Whitney Point | 4 | 61 | 55 | |
| 1989 | D | Avoca | 5 | Sugar Loaf (Chester) | 9 | 66 | 61 | |
| 1990 | A | Hempstead | 8 | Mount Vernon | 1 | 60 | 42 | |
| 1990 | B | Jamesville-DeWitt | 3 | Newark | 5 | 60 | 52 | |
| 1990 | C | Rensselaer | 2 | Buffalo Traditional | 6 | 80 | 68 | |
| 1990 | D | Alexander Hamilton (Elmsford) | 1 | Avoca | 5 | 57 | 54 | |
| 1991 | A | Mount Vernon | 1 | Henninger (Syracuse) | 3 | 80 | 65 | |
| 1991 | B | Nottingham (Syracuse) | 3 | Nyack | 1 | 72 | 70 | 1 |
| 1991 | C | Watervliet | 2 | Livonia | 5 | 68 | 58 | |
| 1991 | D | Prattsburgh | 5 | Argyle | 2 | 80 | 72 | |
| 1992 | A | Greece Athena (Rochester) | 5 | Liverpool | 3 | 60 | 37 | |
| 1992 | B | George Fowler (Syracuse) | 3 | Palmyra-Macedon | 5 | 79 | 61 | |
| 1992 | C | Mynderse Academy (Seneca Falls) | 5 | Malverne | 8 | 85 | 79 | |
| 1992 | D | Notre Dame (Batavia) | 5 | Bishop Grimes (East Syracuse) | 3 | 70 | 58 | |
| 1993 | A | Hempstead | 8 | Mount Vernon | 1 | 55 | 54 | |
| 1993 | B | Norwich | 4 | Franklin (Rochester) | 5 | 56 | 49 | |
| 1993 | C | Whitney Point | 4 | Broadalbin-Perth | 2 | 57 | 53 | |
| 1993 | D | Clyde-Savannah | 5 | Tuckahoe | 1 | 76 | 66 | |
| 1994 | A | White Plains | 1 | West Genesee (Camillus) | 3 | 65 | 60 | |
| 1994 | B | Norwich | 4 | Central Square | 3 | 49 | 29 | |
| 1994 | C | Bishop Ludden (Syracuse) | 3 | Mynderse Academy (Seneca Falls) | 5 | 64 | 54 | |
| 1994 | D | Hamilton | 3 | Tuckahoe | 1 | 59 | 39 | |
| 1995 | A | La Salle (Niagara Falls) | 6 | Henninger (Syracuse) | 3 | 67 | 57 | |
| 1995 | B | Poughkeepsie | 1 | Amsterdam | 2 | 62 | 53 | |
| 1995 | C | Peekskill | 1 | Buffalo Traditional | 6 | 94 | 85 | 1 |
| 1995 | D | Maple Grove (Bemus Point) | 6 | Sugar Loaf (Chester) | 9 | 61 | 54 | |
| 1996 | A | La Salle (Niagara Falls) | 6 | Newburgh | 9 | 77 | 66 | |
| 1996 | B | Peekskill | 1 | Franklin (Rochester) | 5 | 71 | 62 | |
| 1996 | C | Buffalo Traditional | 6 | Mechanicville | 2 | 62 | 48 | |
| 1996 | D | Bridgehampton | 11 | West Canada Valley (Newport) | 3 | 51 | 37 | |
| 1997 | A | McQuaid Jesuit (Rochester) | 5 | Hempstead | 8 | 69 | 55 | |
| 1997 | B | Westhill (Geddes) | 3 | Walter Panas (Cortlandt Manor) | 1 | 64 | 53 | |
| 1997 | C | Christian Brothers Academy (DeWitt) | 3 | Lyons | 5 | 66 | 54 | |
| 1997 | D | Bridgehampton | 11 | Hammond | 10 | 79 | 55 | |
| 1998 | A | Schenectady | 2 | Hempstead | 8 | 61 | 51 | |
| 1998 | B | Westhampton Beach | 11 | Westhill (Geddes) | 3 | 56 | 36 | |
| 1998 | C | Sidney | 4 | Watervliet | 2 | 63 | 47 | |
| 1998 | D | Bridgehampton | 11 | Jasper-Troupsburg | 5 | 67 | 33 | |
| 1999 | A | White Plains | 1 | Colonie | 2 | 46 | 43 | |
| 1999 | B | Southampton | 11 | Bishop Kearney (Irondequoit) | 5 | 55 | 42 | |
| 1999 | C | Buffalo Traditional | 6 | Notre Dame (Utica) | 3 | 61 | 51 | |
| 1999 | D | Millbrook | 9 | Fort Ann | 2 | 44 | 31 | |
| 2000 | A | Mount Vernon | 1 | Longwood (Middle Island) | 11 | 76 | 69 | 1 |
| 2000 | B | Amityville | 11 | Notre Dame (Utica) | 3 | 66 | 52 | |
| 2000 | C | Buffalo Traditional | 6 | Malverne | 8 | 66 | 62 | |
| 2000 | D | Hamilton | 3 | Alexander Hamilton (Elmsford) | 1 | 91 | 86 | 3 |
| 2001 | A | Schenectady | 2 | Hempstead | 8 | 69 | 45 | |
| 2001 | B | Amityville | 11 | Williamsville East | 6 | 87 | 70 | |
| 2001 | C | Buffalo Traditional | 6 | Mechanicville | 2 | 78 | 53 | |
| 2001 | D | Notre Dame (Batavia) | 5 | Hamilton | 3 | 62 | 61 | |
| 2002 | A | Henninger (Syracuse) | 3 | McQuaid Jesuit (Rochester) | 5 | 71 | 56 | |
| 2002 | B | Amityville | 11 | Peekskill | 1 | 67 | 57 | |
| 2002 | C | Blind Brook (Rye Brook) | 1 | City Honors (Buffalo) | 6 | 57 | 49 | |
| 2002 | D | City Honors (Buffalo) | 6 | Harrisville | 10 | 49 | 48 | |
| 2003 | A | McQuaid Jesuit (Rochester) | 5 | Mount Vernon | 1 | 57 | 50 | |
| 2003 | B | Amityville | 11 | Glens Falls | 2 | 77 | 52 | |
| 2003 | C | City Honors (Buffalo) | 6 | Cooperstown | 3 | 66 | 59 | |
| 2003 | D | S. S. Seward Institute (Florida) | 9 | Moriah | 7 | 68 | 52 | |
| 2004 | AA | Mount Vernon | 1 | Niagara Falls | 6 | 56 | 46 | |
| 2004 | A | Jamesville-DeWitt | 3 | Amityville | 11 | 56 | 52 | |
| 2004 | B | John F. Kennedy Catholic (Somers) | 1 | Malverne | 8 | 53 | 52 | |
| 2004 | C | Blind Brook (Rye Brook) | 1 | Tully | 3 | 52 | 43 | |
| 2004 | D | Alexander Hamilton (Elmsford) | 1 | Whitesville | 5 | 50 | 44 | |
| 2005 | AA | Niagara Falls | 6 | New Rochelle | 1 | 69 | 58 | |
| 2005 | A | Peekskill | 1 | Mexico | 3 | 75 | 61 | |
| 2005 | B | Palmyra-Macedon | 5 | Carle Place | 8 | 57 | 47 | |
| 2005 | C | Sodus | 5 | Faith Heritage (Syracuse) | 3 | 76 | 65 | |
| 2005 | D | Martin Luther King (Hastings-on-Hudson) | 1 | Fort Edward | 2 | 76 | 57 | |
| 2006 | AA | Mount Vernon | 1 | Niagara Falls | 6 | 57 | 53 | |
| 2006 | A | Peekskill | 1 | Sweet Home (Amherst) | 6 | 46 | 39 | |
| 2006 | B | Lackawanna | 6 | John F. Kennedy Catholic (Somers) | 1 | 67 | 50 | |
| 2006 | C | Campbell-Savona | 5 | Stillwater | 2 | 39 | 35 | |
| 2006 | D | Charles Finney (Penfield) | 5 | Martin Luther King (Hastings-on-Hudson) | 1 | 60 | 58 | |
| 2007 | AA | Mount Vernon | 1 | Bishop Maginn (Albany) | 2 | 68 | 65 | |
| 2007 | A | Peekskill | 1 | Glens Falls | 2 | 58 | 48 | |
| 2007 | B | Malverne | 8 | Ogdensburg Free Academy | 10 | 44 | 42 | |
| 2007 | C | Sidney | 4 | Friends Academy (Locust Valley) | 8 | 67 | 49 | |
| 2007 | D | Charles Finney (Penfield) | 5 | Chateaugay | 10 | 45 | 27 | |
| 2008 | AA | Bishop Maginn (Albany) | 2 | Niagara Falls | 6 | 68 | 37 | |
| 2008 | A | Jamesville-DeWitt | 3 | East Hampton | 11 | 78 | 54 | |
| 2008 | B | Olean | 6 | Malverne | 8 | 63 | 53 | |
| 2008 | C | Maple Grove (Bemus Point) | 6 | Mechanicville | 2 | 71 | 46 | |
| 2008 | D | Chateaugay | 10 | Northstar Christian Academy (Rochester) | 5 | 52 | 41 | |
| 2009 | AA | Newburgh Free Academy | 9 | Niagara Falls | 6 | 62 | 42 | |
| 2009 | A | Jamesville-DeWitt | 3 | Peekskill | 1 | 77 | 75 | |
| 2009 | B | Bishop Kearney (Irondequoit) | 5 | Seton Catholic (Binghamton) | 4 | 65 | 48 | |
| 2009 | C | Avon | 5 | Maple Hill (Castleton) | 2 | 61 | 55 | |
| 2009 | D | South Kortright | 4 | Greenport | 11 | 47 | 43 | |
| 2010 | AA | Christian Brothers Academy (Albany) | 2 | Half Hollow Hills West (Dix Hills) | 11 | 71 | 53 | |
| 2010 | A | Jamesville-DeWitt | 3 | Newark | 5 | 59 | 45 | |
| 2010 | B | Westhill (Geddes) | 3 | Burke Catholic (Goshen) | 9 | 60 | 51 | |
| 2010 | C | OTC/Middle Early College (Buffalo) | 6 | Maple Hill (Castleton) | 2 | 74 | 41 | |
| 2010 | D | Maple Grove (Bemus Point) | 6 | Coleman Catholic (Hurley) | 9 | 43 | 38 | |
| 2011 | AA | Mount Vernon | 1 | Jamestown | 6 | 62 | 51 | |
| 2011 | A | Jamesville-DeWitt | 3 | Harborfields | 11 | 66 | 51 | |
| 2011 | B | Burke Catholic (Goshen) | 9 | Potsdam | 10 | 62 | 52 | |
| 2011 | C | Friends Academy (Locust Valley) | 8 | Syracuse Academy of Science | 3 | 46 | 44 | |
| 2011 | D | New York Mills | 3 | Coleman Catholic (Hurley) | 9 | 47 | 42 | |
| 2012 | AA | Mount Vernon | 1 | Aquinas Institute (Rochester) | 5 | 61 | 57 | |
| 2012 | A | Harborfields | 11 | Tappan Zee (Orangeburg) | 1 | 67 | 58 | |
| 2012 | B | Bishop Ludden (Syracuse) | 3 | Watervliet | 2 | 43 | 42 | |
| 2012 | C | Tuckahoe | 1 | OTC/Middle Early College (Buffalo) | 6 | 77 | 66 | |
| 2012 | D | Sackets Harbor | 3 | Madrid-Waddington | 10 | 49 | 35 | |
| 2013 | AA | Bishop Kearney (Irondequoit) | 5 | New Rochelle | 1 | 45 | 39 | |
| 2013 | A | McKinley (Buffalo) | 6 | Burke Catholic (Goshen) | 9 | 76 | 73 | 1 |
| 2013 | B | Watervliet | 2 | Babylon | 11 | 72 | 60 | 1 |
| 2013 | C | Lake George | 2 | Pine Plains | 9 | 55 | 45 | |
| 2013 | D | Argyle | 2 | Martin Luther King (Hastings-on-Hudson) | 1 | 58 | 33 | |
| 2014 | AA | Green Tech (Albany) | 2 | Jamestown | 6 | 54 | 49 | |
| 2014 | A | Scotia-Glenville | 2 | East (Rochester) | 5 | 66 | 44 | |
| 2014 | B | Westhill (Geddes) | 3 | Olean | 6 | 93 | 55 | |
| 2014 | C | Hoosic Valley (Schaghticoke) | 2 | OTC/Middle Early College (Buffalo) | 6 | 67 | 55 | |
| 2014 | D | New York Mills | 3 | Coleman Catholic (Hurley) | 9 | 57 | 50 | 1 |
| 2015 | AA | Shenendehowa (Clifton Park) | 2 | Brentwood | 11 | 76 | 63 | |
| 2015 | A | Scotia-Glenville | 2 | Greece Athena (Rochester) | 5 | 54 | 49 | |
| 2015 | B | Westhill (Geddes) | 3 | Woodlands (Hartsdale) | 1 | 70 | 62 | |
| 2015 | C | Lake George | 2 | Waterville | 3 | 53 | 50 | |
| 2015 | D | Bridgehampton | 11 | New York Mills | 3 | 62 | 49 | |
| 2016 | AA | Aquinas Institute (Rochester) | 5 | Middletown | 9 | 68 | 50 | |
| 2016 | A | Elmont Memorial | 8 | Troy | 2 | 57 | 43 | |
| 2016 | B | Olean | 6 | Marlboro | 9 | 56 | 45 | |
| 2016 | C | Middle Early College (Buffalo) | 6 | Haldane (Cold Spring) | 1 | 82 | 40 | |
| 2016 | D | Oriskany | 3 | Moriah | 7 | 79 | 54 | |
| 2017 | AA | Mount Vernon | 1 | Fairport | 5 | 59 | 48 | |
| 2017 | A | Irondequoit | 5 | Our Lady of Lourdes (Poughkeepsie) | 1 | 54 | 43 | |
| 2017 | B | Westhill (Geddes) | 3 | Canton | 10 | 80 | 62 | |
| 2017 | C | Moravia | 4 | Lake George | 2 | 54 | 39 | |
| 2017 | D | Moriah | 7 | Newfield | 4 | 61 | 52 | |
| 2018 | AA | Liverpool | 3 | Half Hollow Hills East (Dix Hills) | 11 | 71 | 65 | |
| 2018 | A | Amityville | 11 | Ardsley | 1 | 74 | 54 | |
| 2018 | B | Mekeel Christian Academy (Scotia) | 2 | Seton Catholic Central (Binghamton) | 4 | 42 | 37 | |
| 2018 | C | Lake George | 2 | Northstar Christian Academy (Rochester) | 5 | 66 | 65 | |
| 2018 | D | East (Buffalo) | 6 | Moriah | 7 | 74 | 61 | 1 |
| 2019 | AA | West Genesee (Camillus) | 3 | Brentwood | 11 | 70 | 57 | |
| 2019 | A | Poughkeepsie | 1 | Pittsford Mendon | 5 | 69 | 59 | |
| 2019 | B | Glens Falls | 2 | Lowville Academy | 3 | 75 | 74 | 1 |
| 2019 | C | Cooperstown | 3 | Middle Early College (Buffalo) | 6 | 71 | 61 | |
| 2019 | D | Harrisville | 10 | Oppenheim-Ephratah-St. Johnsville (St. Johnsville) | 2 | 67 | 54 | |
| 2020 | Cancelled, due to coronavirus pandemic | | | | | | | |
| 2021 | Cancelled, due to coronavirus pandemic | | | | | | | |
| 2022 | AA | Mount Vernon | 1 | Green Tech (Albany) | 2 | 55 | 45 | |
| 2022 | A | Manhasset | 8 | New Hartford | 3 | 62 | 51 | |
| 2022 | B | Ichabod Crane (Kinderhook) | 2 | Friends Academy (Locust Valley) | 8 | 63 | 62 | |
| 2022 | C | Newfield (Selden) | 4 | Stillwater | 2 | 87 | 62 | |
| 2022 | D | Avoca-Prattsburgh | 5 | Heuvelton | 10 | 70 | 58 | |
| 2023 | AA | Victor | 5 | North Rockland | 1 | 56 | 38 | |
| 2023 | A | Tappan Zee (Orangeburg) | 1 | Irondequoit | 5 | 49 | 36 | |
| 2023 | B | Westhill (Geddes) | 3 | Catholic Central (Latham) | 2 | 66 | 61 | |
| 2023 | C | Randolph | 6 | Haldane (Cold Spring) | 1 | 58 | 55 | |
| 2023 | D | Avoca-Prattsburgh | 5 | Chapel Field Christian | 9 | 70 | 48 | |
| 2024 | AAA | Green Tech (Albany) | 2 | Bay Shore | 11 | 79 | 63 | |
| 2024 | AA | Elmont Memorial | 8 | West Genesee (Camillus) | 3 | 51 | 44 | |
| 2024 | A | Glens Falls | 2 | Wayne (Ontario Center) | 5 | 50 | 37 | |
| 2024 | B | Stillwater | 2 | Marcellus | 3 | 59 | 50 | |
| 2024 | C | Moravia | 4 | Haldane (Cold Spring) | 1 | 41 | 38 | |
| 2024 | D | North Warren | 2 | Sackets Harbor | 3 | 68 | 66 | |
| 2025 | AAA | Shaker (Latham) | 2 | Schreiber (Port Washington) | 8 | 55 | 50 | |
| 2025 | AA | Binghamton | 4 | Niskayuna | 2 | 75 | 61 | 2 |
| 2025 | A | Glens Falls | 2 | Mount Sinai | 11 | 77 | 57 | |
| 2025 | B | Marcellus | 3 | Woodlands (Hartsdale) | 1 | 63 | 58 | |
| 2025 | C | Berne-Knox-Westerlo | 2 | Honeoye | 5 | 63 | 47 | |
| 2025 | D | Panama | 6 | Bridgehampton | 11 | 78 | 69 | |
| 2026 | AAA | Christian Brothers Academy (Albany) | 2 | Fairport | 5 | 78 | 67 | |
| 2026 | AA | Penfield | 5 | Amsterdam | 2 | 62 | 54 | |
| 2026 | A | Westhill (Geddes) | 3 | Hudson | 2 | 54 | 42 | |
| 2026 | B | Marcellus | 3 | KIPP Capital | 2 | 62 | 47 | |
| 2026 | C | Cooperstown | 3 | Berne-Knox-Westerlo | 2 | 52 | 43 | |
| 2026 | D | Bolton | 7 | Sackets Harbor | 3 | 65 | 49 | |

== Championships by school ==
Results through 2026:

| Rank | School | Wins | Years |
|---|---|---|---|
| 1 | Mount Vernon | 12 | 1978, 1979, 1981, 1991, 2000, 2004, 2006, 2007, 2011, 2012, 2017, 2022 |
| 2 | Bridgehampton | 9 | 1978, 1979, 1980, 1984, 1986, 1996, 1997, 1998, 2015 |
| 3 | Westhill | 7 | 1997, 2010, 2014, 2015, 2017, 2023, 2026 |
| 4 | Jamesville-DeWitt | 6 | 1990, 2004, 2008, 2009, 2010, 2011 |
| 5 | Amityville | 5 | 2000, 2001, 2002, 2003, 2018 |
| 5 | Peekskill | 5 | 1995, 1996, 2005, 2006, 2007 |
| 7 | Alexander Hamilton (Elmsford) | 4 | 1987, 1988, 1990, 2004 |
| 7 | Buffalo Traditional | 4 | 1996, 1999, 2000, 2001 |

== Championships by section ==
Results through 2026:

| Rank | Section | Champions | Runners-up |
|---|---|---|---|
| 1 | Section 3 | 35 | 32 |
| 2 | Section 1 | 32 | 32 |
| 3 | Section 2 | 31 | 32 |
| 4 | Section 5 | 30 | 31 |
| 5 | Section 6 | 27 | 21 |
| 6 | Section 11 | 24 | 17 |
| 7 | Section 4 | 14 | 8 |
| 8 | Section 8 | 13 | 16 |
| 9 | Section 9 | 5 | 16 |
| 10 | Section 10 | 2 | 8 |
| 11 | Section 7 | 2 | 3 |
