= City Honors School =

High school in Buffalo, New York, United States

City Honors School at Fosdick-Masten Park
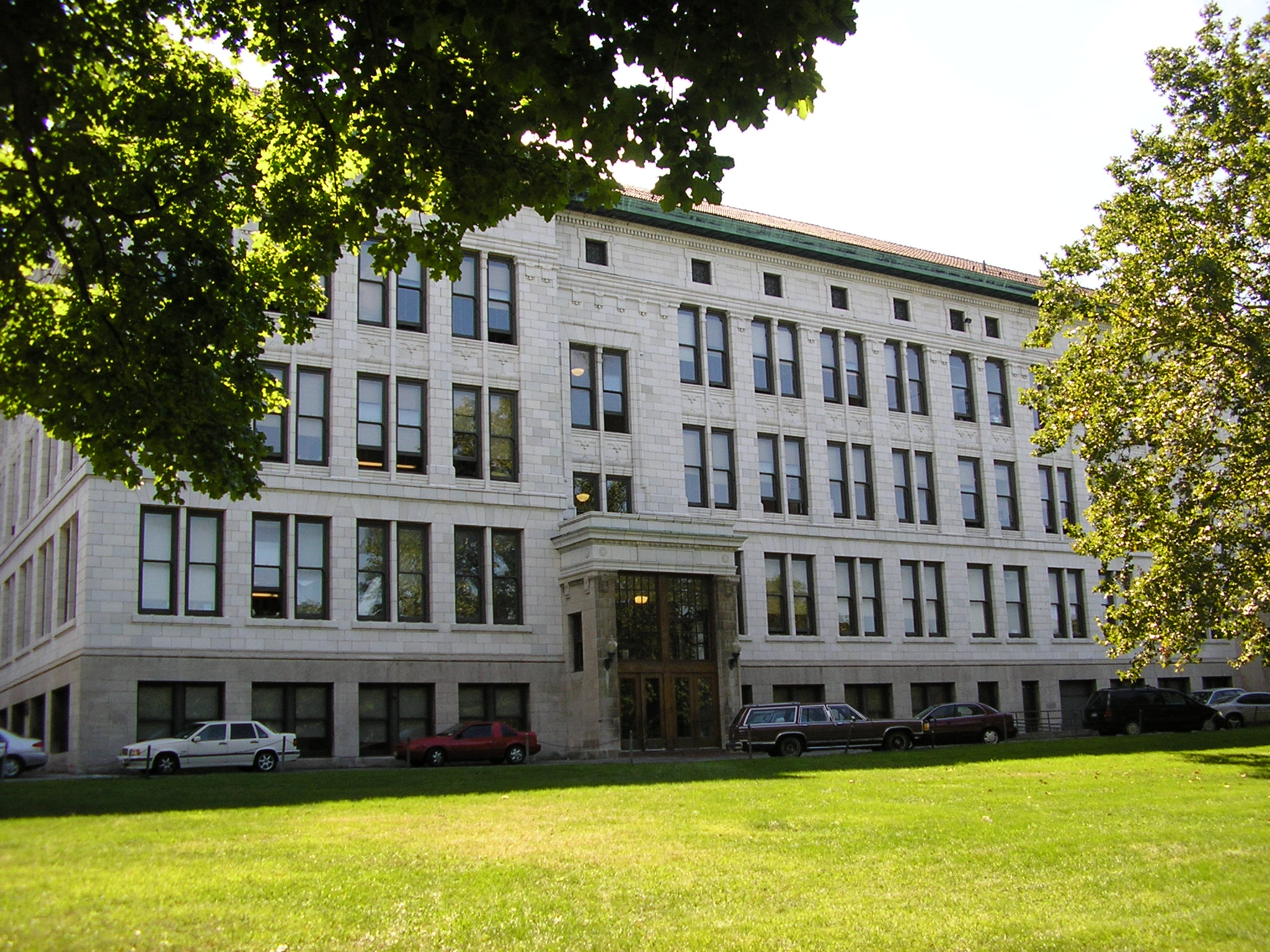
- The front of City Honors School

Location
- 186 East North Street; Buffalo, (Erie County), New York 14204; United States; 42°54′11.16″N 78°51′38.2″W

Information
- Type: Public exam school
- Established: 1975
- School district: Buffalo Public Schools
- Principal: William A. Kresse
- Grades: 5-12
- Enrollment: 1042
- Campus type: Urban
- Colors: Cardinal red and silver
- Mascot: Centaurs
- Accreditation: IB
- National ranking: 187th (2024)
- Newspaper: Silent Noise and Ques (Previous student newspapers include Quærere, Dimensions, and Triumph, along with the unofficial publications The Potters Field, Schism, Seditious Libel and The Liberator.)
- Website: City Honors School

City Honors School at Fosdick-Masten Park, known colloquially as City Honors or CHS, is a college preparatory school in Buffalo, New York, United States. It is part of the Buffalo Public Schools system. The school was founded in 1975 for academically gifted and talented high school students by three faculty members from Bennett High School and Clinton Junior High School. In 1975, it was born as a school-within-a-school program, and in one year it became a school of its own. It is located in the historic Fosdick-Masten Park High School, which was listed on the National Register of Historic Places in 1983.

Today, the school curriculum includes Advanced Placement and International Baccalaureate courses as well as Regents courses required by New York State Education Department. Currently, 1,070 students from grades 5-12 attend the school. In 2014, The Washington Post ranked City Honors as the most challenging high school in the northeast, based on the number of college-level exams taken per graduate.

== History ==
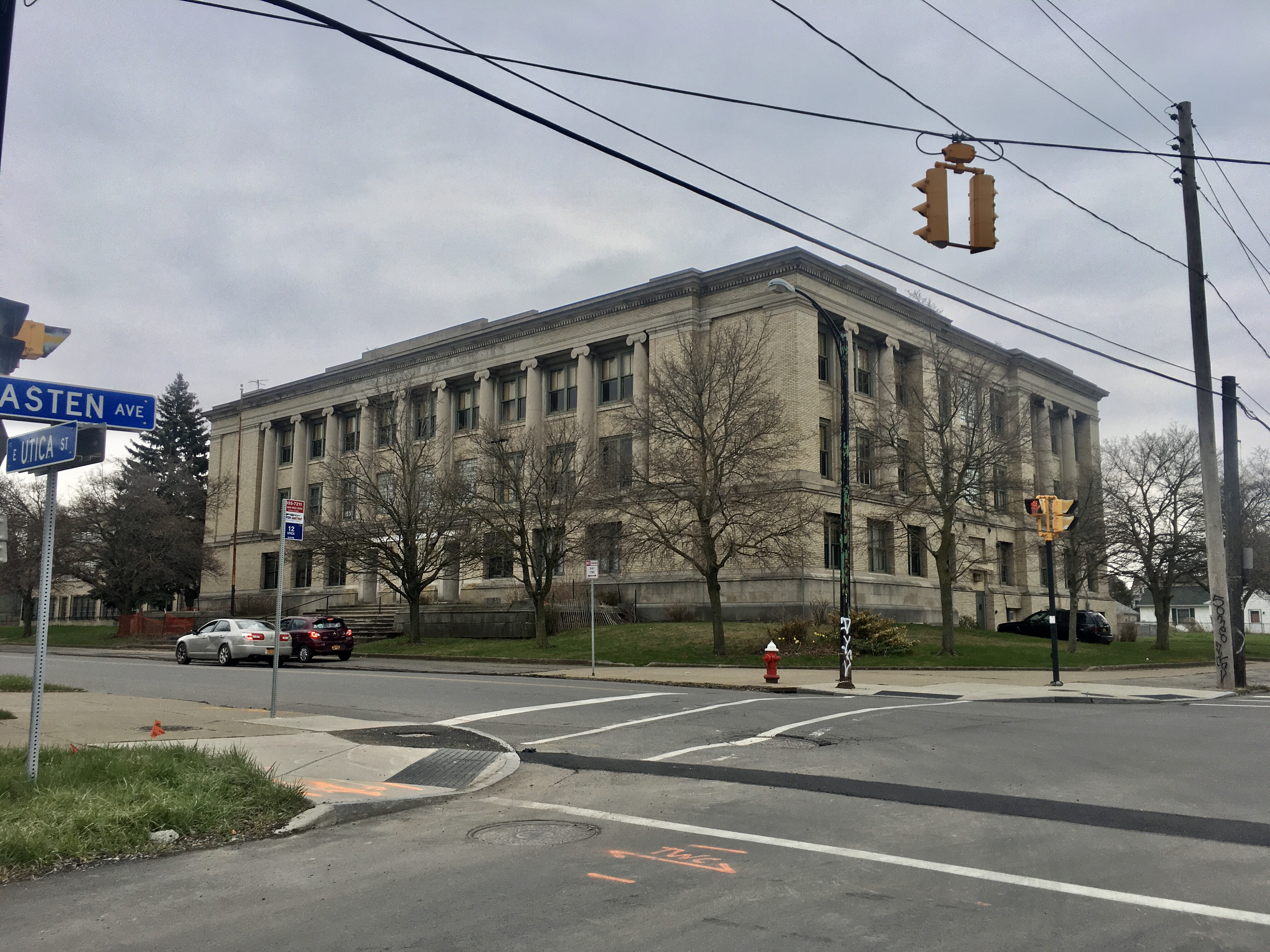
School 8

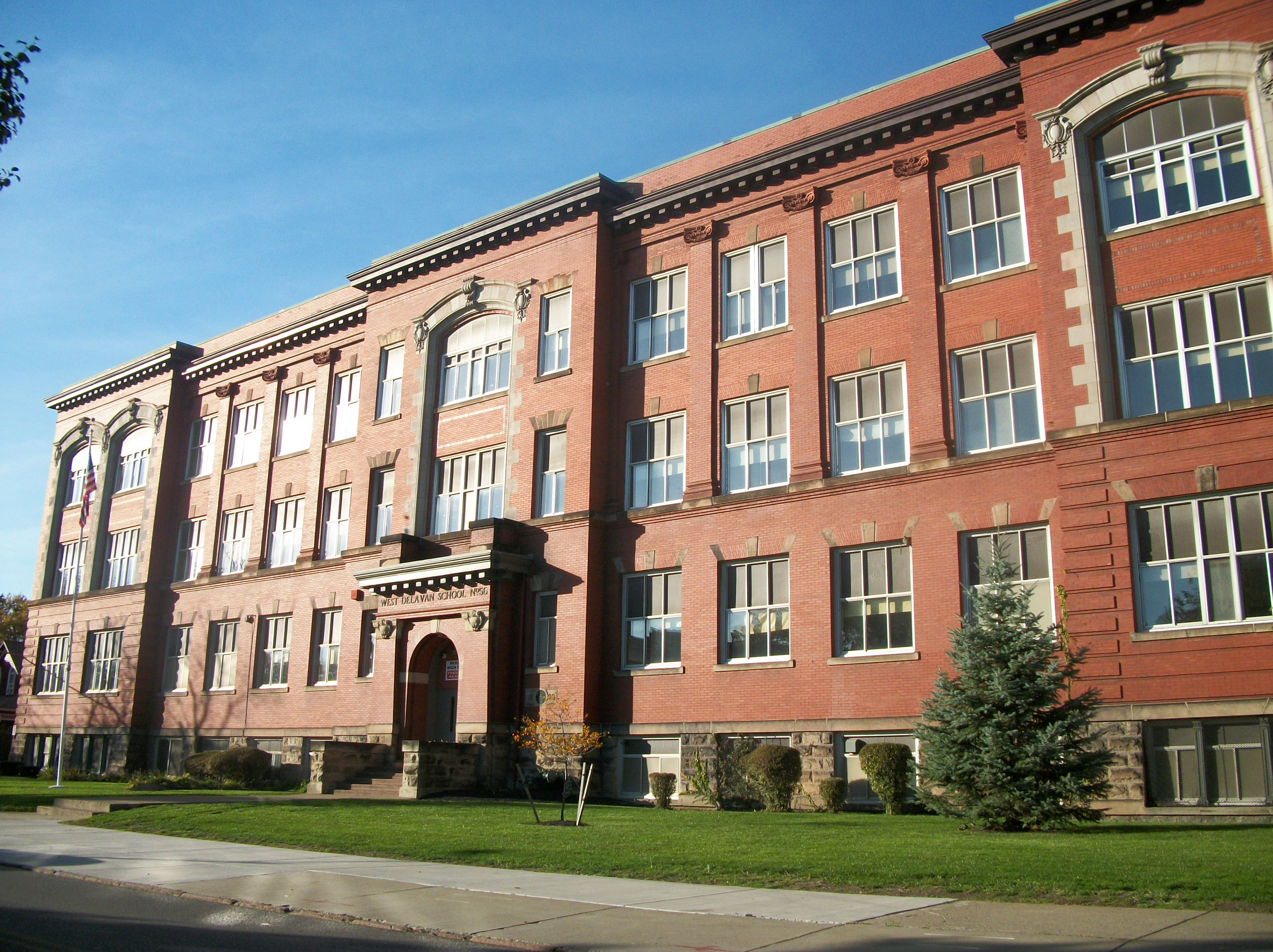
School 56

City Honors began as a series of enrichment topics at Bennett High School in 1973, known as "Course Y". Selected students took classes in the evening that dealt with enrichment courses and interdisciplinary topics. Increased student demand led to these workshops becoming a "school-within-a-school" at Bennett beginning in 1975, with a partnership being forged with nearby Canisius College.

In 1976, City Honors landed its own building, the former P.S. 17 located at the corner of Main and Delavan, which would allow the school to add grades 5 through 8 and strengthen its affiliation with Canisius. This made City Honors one of the first magnet elementary schools in the district.

The school moved to its current location at the Fosdick-Masten Park High School building in 1980.

In 1991, City Honors adopted the International Baccalaureate program.

From 2007 to 2009, the Masten/Fosdick location underwent a $40 million expansion and renovation project that included a new athletic complex. During that time, grades 5-8 were temporarily housed at School 56, and grades 9–12 at School 8.

=== Former principals ===
Previous assignment and reason for departure are denoted in parentheses.

- Jane E. Morris – 1976–1977 (principal - P.S. 41, named principal of P.S. 61 Early Childhood Center 61)
- Elmer J. Schamber – 1977–1978 (principal - West Hertel Academy, named principal of Buffalo Academy for Visual and Performing Arts)
- Angelo J. Gianturco – 1978–1980 (principal - West Hertel Academy, named interim principal of Southside Junior High School)
- Michael J. Anelli – 1980–1995 (principal - Riverside High School, retired)
- Paul A. Lafornara – 1995–2000 (principal - South Park High School, retired)
- Catherine F. Battaglia – 2000–2005 (staff developer - Niagara Falls City School District, named community superintendent for Buffalo Public Schools)

== 2007 human remains found ==
In anticipation of the school reconstruction project, workers dug exploratory shafts in December 2007. This was done because the school building had been built on the site of an old potter's field and there was concern that not all remains had been moved when the school was originally built. Crews found the skeletal remains of two adults and one infant.

At that time, those remains were moved to Forest Lawn Cemetery. In May 2008, digging resumed and many more human remains were found. All remains in the reconstruction areas have been removed. They were examined at Utica College and were sent to Forest Lawn for re-interment.

== Sports ==
An image of City Honors' hockey team, showing the centaur logo

City Honors students participate in a wide variety of varsity and club sports, including baseball, men's and women's basketball, bowling, cheerleading, men's and women's crew, men's and women's cross country, men's hockey, men's and women's rugby, men's and women's soccer, women's softball, men's and women's swim team, men's and women's tennis, men's and women's track & field, and women's volleyball.

- The men's basketball team won the New York State Class C Championship in 2003, defeating Cooperstown 66–59. In 2002, the team went to the title game but lost to Blind Brook 57–49.
- From 1990 to 1993, the women's volleyball team won four straight New York State Class C Championships.
- City Honors was the first public school in western New York with its own rowing program. Founded in 1996, the men's and women's crew teams have consistently been among the top teams in the nation, winning several state championships and even a national championship over the last few years. The team has also won medals in several regional regattas, and has participated in the prestigious Stotesbury Cup. Independently of City Honors Crew, members of the team have had success in the Royal Canadian Henley Regatta and the US Rowing Nationals, and one member even made it to the Junior National team.
- Former City Honors physical education teacher Drake Francescone — who coached women's softball, men's basketball, women's volleyball, men's and women's cross country, men's and women's swimming, and men's and women's tennis — is one of only 25 members of the New York State Public High School Athletic Association Hall of Fame. He was inducted in 2006.
- City Honors was one of the first high schools in western New York to have a rugby team. The men's team won the Division II state title in 2004–05. The women's team placed well in a national tournament in 2005–06. In January 2006, women's rugby team alumna Carretta Reese was named to the USA Rugby National Women's Team.
- City Honors was the first Buffalo Public School to make it into the finals of its New York State Regional Sectionals in 2019.

== Awards and recognition ==
- The building that houses City Honors is listed on the National Register of Historic Places.
- City Honors School has been named as one of the top public high schools and middle schools in Western New York (or near the top) by Business First every year since the publication began its rankings in 1997.
- City Honors School was ranked #4 on Newsweek magazine's list of America's Top Public High Schools for 2006.
- City Honors School was named #8 on Newsweek's list of America's Top Public High Schools for 2007.
- City Honors was ranked #10 on Newsweek's list of America's Top Public High Schools in 2010.
- City Honors was named a National Blue Ribbon School in 2024.

== Notable alumni ==
Notable alumni from City Honors and Fosdick-Masten Park High School include:

- Molly Burhans - environmentalist, Cartographer, UN Champion of the Earth; Class of '07
- Bill Burton - political consultant, communication strategist, Deputy White House Press Secretary during the Obama administration; Class of '95
- Lucille Clifton - poet; Class of '53
- Jake Halpern - author; Class of '93; with illustrator Michael Sloan, won the Pulitzer Prize for editorial cartooning in 2018
- Richard Hofstadter - Pulitzer Prize-winning historian; often cited as one of the leading public intellectuals of the 20th century; Class of '33
- Kit Klein - speed skater; won gold medals in the 1932 and 1936 Winter Olympics; Class of '28
- Steve Mesler - member of the 2006 U.S. Olympic Bobsled Team; 2010 gold medal winner in the four-man bobsleigh with USA-1; Class of '96
- Connie Porter - author; Class of '77
- Buffalo Bob Smith - entertainer; host of the popular 1950s children's show Howdy Doody; Class of '33
- Rexford Tugwell - economist; member of President Franklin Delano Roosevelt's "Brain Trust"; served as one of the chief architects of the New Deal and directed many New Deal programs; Class of '11
