= Riverside Institute of Technology =

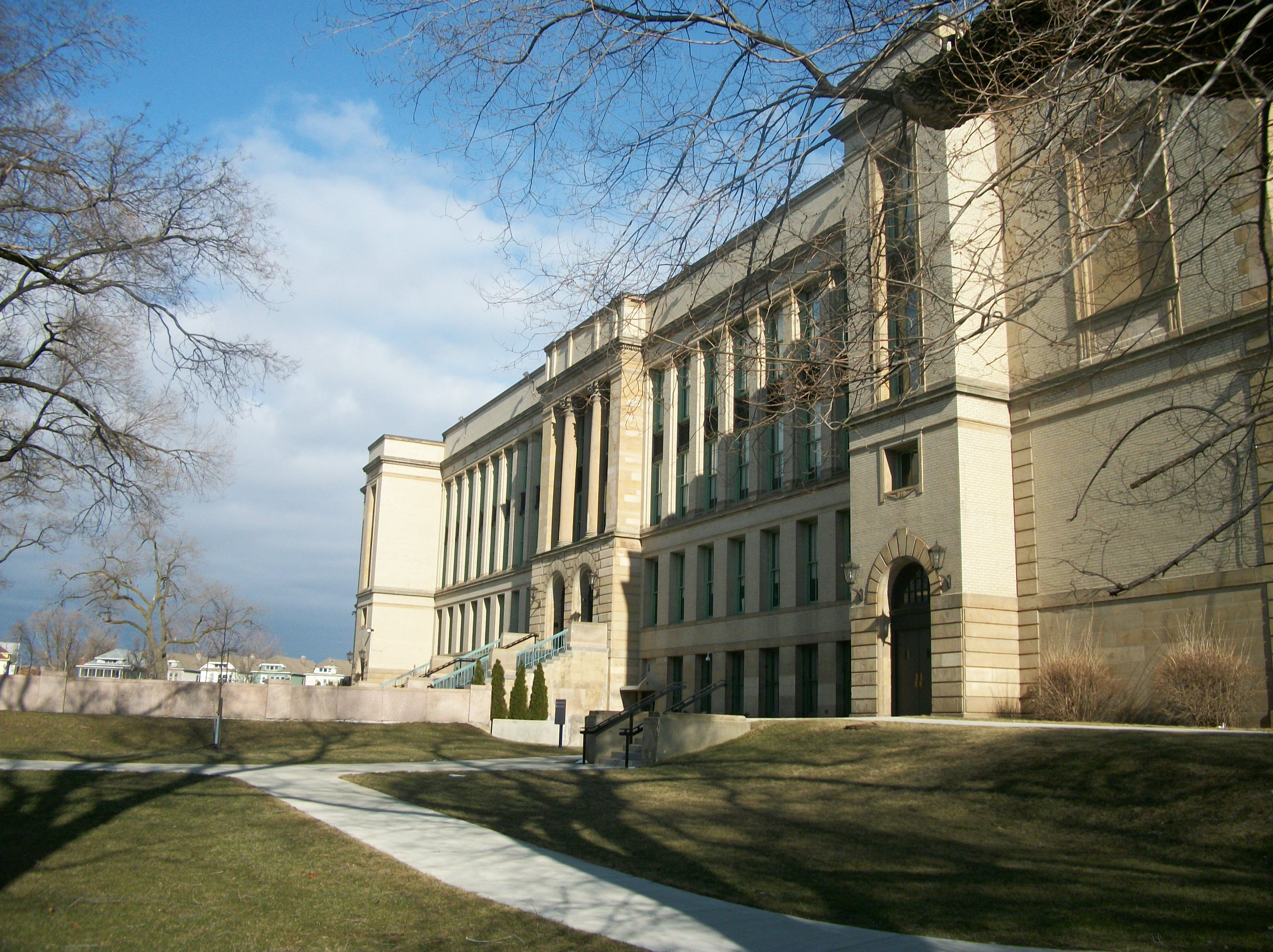

Location
- 51 Ontario Street; Riverside; Buffalo, Erie, New York 14207; United States; 42.947427°N 78.905489°W

Information
- Type: Public, Coeducational
- Closed: 2019
- School district: Buffalo Public Schools
- School number: 205
- Grades: 9–12
- Campus type: Urban
- Colors: Purple and Gold
- Athletics conference: Section VI
- Team name: Frontiers
- Yearbook: The Skipper

Riverside Institute of Technology (formerly known as Riverside High School) was a public high school located in Buffalo, New York. It served Grades 9–12 and taught according to the Board of Regents. Riverside closed in June 2019 after years of low academic performance and safety concerns.

== History ==
Riverside High School began construction in the late 1920s and was completed in time for the 1930 school year. Beginning in 1993, the school also housed the Buffalo Academy of Math and Science a magnet school for Grades 7 and 8. In 1999, the two schools merged and the name of the school was changed to "Riverside Institute of Technology", however, the Grade 7 and 8 component only lasted for a few years.

The building was renovated from 2008 to 2010. The new renovations included updated classrooms and improvements to the auditorium, as well as a new weight room, sports vailiion and football field. While the school was being renovated, 9th and 10th graders were temporarily housed at School 51 in nearby Black Rock, while 11th and 12th graders remained in the Riverside building.

In 2015, Riverside Institute of Technology began phasing out due to low academic performance. The final Riverside class graduated in 2019. It was replaced by the new Riverside Academy High School, which opened in Fall 2017.

=== Principals ===
Previous assignment and reason for departure denoted in parentheses

- Charles W. Whitney–1930-1944 (Assistant Principal - Hutchinson Central High School, retired)
- Raymond W. Spear–1944-1957 (Acting Principal - Bennett High School, retired)
- Carl S. Walz–1957-1971 (Assistant Principal - Riverside High School, retired)
- Michael J. Anelli–1971-1980 (Assistant Principal - East High School, named Principal of City Honors School)
- Doris H. Erickson–1980-1985 (Assistant Principal - Southside Junior High School, named Principal of South Park Prep)
- Nicholas F. DiPirro–1985-1987 (Assistant Principal - Seneca Vocational High School, named Assistant Principal of Hutchinson Central Technical High School)
- John J. Vella–1987-2004 (Assistant Principal - Bennett High School, retired)
- Michael J. Mogavero–2004-2010 (Principal - Buffalo Traditional School, named director of athletics for Buffalo Public Schools)
- Denise E. Clarke–2010-2015 (Assistant Principal - Riverside Institute of Technology, named Principal of Lafayette High School)
- Ella M. Dunne–2015-2017 (Instructional Specialist - Bennett High School, named Principal of The International Preparatory School)
- Jerome J. Piwko–2017-2019 (Principal - Native American Magnet School, resigned)

== Notable alumni ==
- Joe Ehrmann – Defensive tackle for the Baltimore Colts
- Earl Isaac – Cofounder of FICO
- Clifford Robinson – NBA player, notably played for the Portland Trail Blazers
- Mike Williams – Wide receiver for the Tampa Bay Buccaneers and Buffalo Bills in the National Football League

== Academics ==
Riverside had three small learning communities within its school: The Academy of Entrepreneurship, the Academy of Finance, and the Academy of Health Sciences. Students earned internships, college credit, and job shadowing through these academies. If successful, they graduated with both a Regents Diploma and a CTE endorsement in their academy from Buffalo Public Schools. Riverside also had multiple community partners, including Medaille College, HSBC, Kaleida Health, and the National Academy Foundation.

In 1990, Riverside was named a School of Excellence by New York State for its high test scores and attendance. It held this distinction for a number of years, but was placed on New York State's list of Persistently Lowest Achieving schools in 2010 due to poor test results and graduation rates. This resulted in a number of changes at Riverside, including a new administration and grant funding from New York State.
