= Buffalo Traditional School =

Coordinates: 42.914589°N 78.859673°W

Buffalo Traditional High School
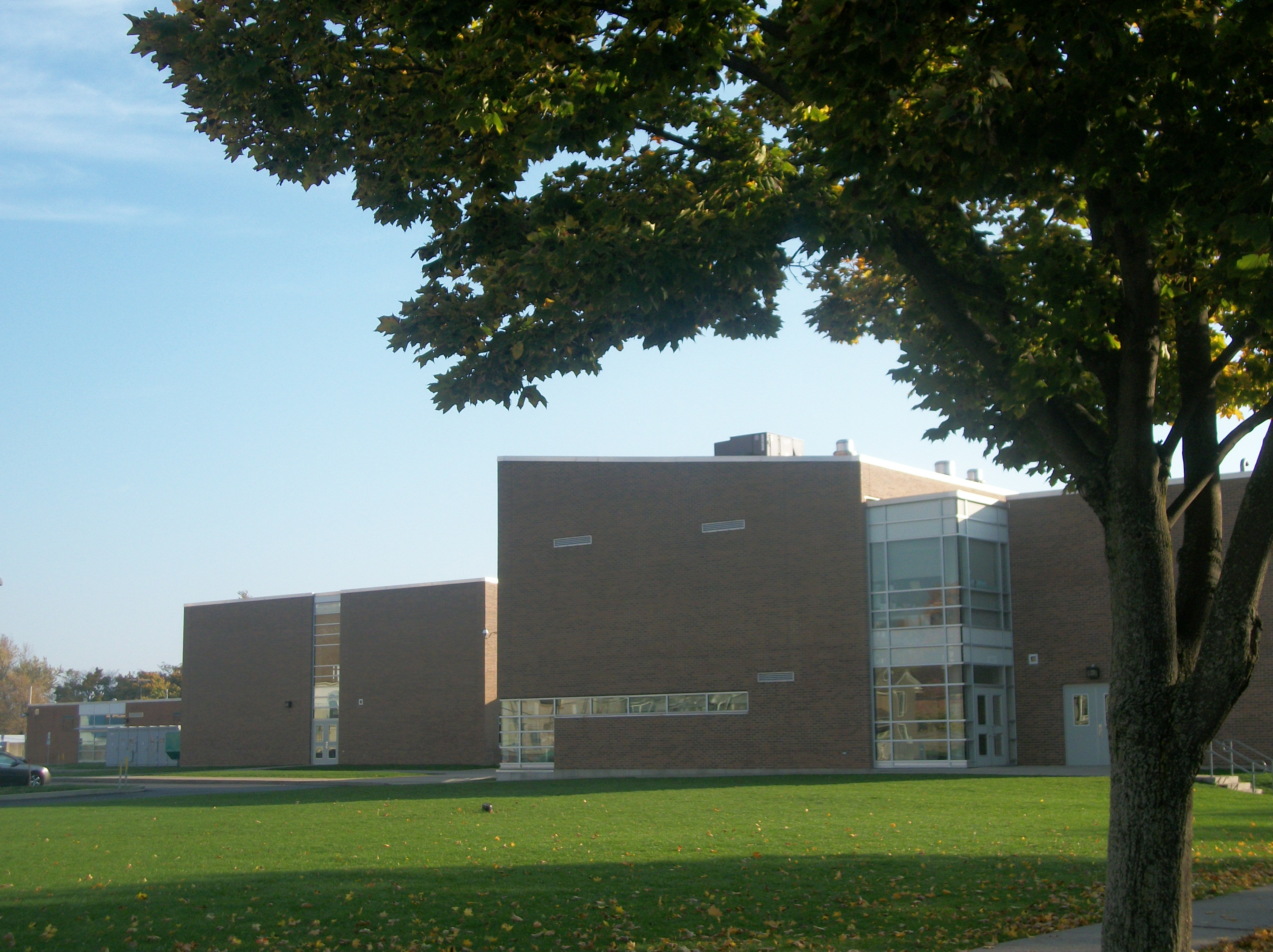

Location
- 450 Masten Avenue; Masten Park; Buffalo, Erie, New York 14209; United States

Information
- Type: Magnet
- Established: 1977
- Closed: 2005
- School number: 192
- Yearbook: Premier

Buffalo Traditional High School is a former magnet school in Buffalo, New York. It served Grades 5 through 12 and was located at 450 Masten Avenue in the city's East Side. It closed in 2005.

== History ==
The building was constructed in 1962 on the former site of Offermann Stadium. It first served as the home as Woodlawn Junior High School and became a symbol of the Civil Rights and integration battles of Buffalo, due to failed efforts by African-American residents to have the school integrated with white students. Buffalo Traditional was created in 1977 as part of Buffalo's desegregation program.

In 2005, the school was closed. The remaining students were transferred to either Emerson/Harvey Austin Middle School or East High School. The building currently serves home to the Buffalo Academy for Visual and Performing Arts.

=== Former principals ===
Previous assignment and reason for departure denoted in parentheses

- James Williams–1977-1983 (Principal - Woodlawn Junior High School, named Principal of Niagara Falls High School)
- Gerald H. Hesson–1983-1984 (Principal assignment to Office of Curriculum - Buffalo Public Schools, named Principal of Buffalo Vocational Technical Center)
- Deborah L. Smith–1984-1988 (Assistant Principal - Bennett High School, named Principal of Red Jacket Academy)
- David M. Greco–1988-1994 (Assistant Principal - Bennett High School, named Principal of Hutchinson Central Technical High School)
- Susan M. Doyle–1994-2003 (Assistant Principal - Riverside High School, named Principal of Middle Early College High School)
- Michael J. Mogavero–2003-2004 (Assistant Principal - South Park High School, named Principal of Riverside Institute Of Technology)
- Geraldine Horton–2004-2005 (Principal - Buffalo Vocational Technical Center, named Principal of East High School)
