= East Community High School =

Location
- 820 Northampton St; Buffalo, New York 14211; United States; 42°54′28″N 78°50′12″W

Information
- Type: Public
- Established: 2016
- School district: Buffalo Public Schools
- School number: 309
- NCES School ID: 360585006594
- Principal: Marlon Lee
- Teaching staff: 36.72 (on an FTE basis)
- Grades: 9-12
- Enrollment: 386 (2024-2025)
- Student to teacher ratio: 10.51
- Campus: City: Large
- Colors: Black and Gold
- Mascot: Panthers
- Yearbook: Eastonian
- Website: www.buffaloschools.org/o/ps309

East Community High School is a high school located on the East Side of Buffalo, New York. It serves 386 students in grades 9–12. The current principal is Tracy Cotter.

== History ==
East Community High School opened in 2016, replacing East High School, which was phased out due to persistently low academic performance and closed in 2018.

=== Former principal ===
Previous assignment and reason for departure denoted in parentheses

- Darryl A. King – 2016-2019 (Assistant Principal - Math, Science, Technology Preparatory School, resigned)

== Academics ==
East Community High School offers career and technical education programs in law enforcement, firefighting, forensics, and legal studies. The building serves as a community school for the greater East Side, offering community and family educational programs after school hours and on selected weekends.
