= Buffalo Academy for Visual and Performing Arts =

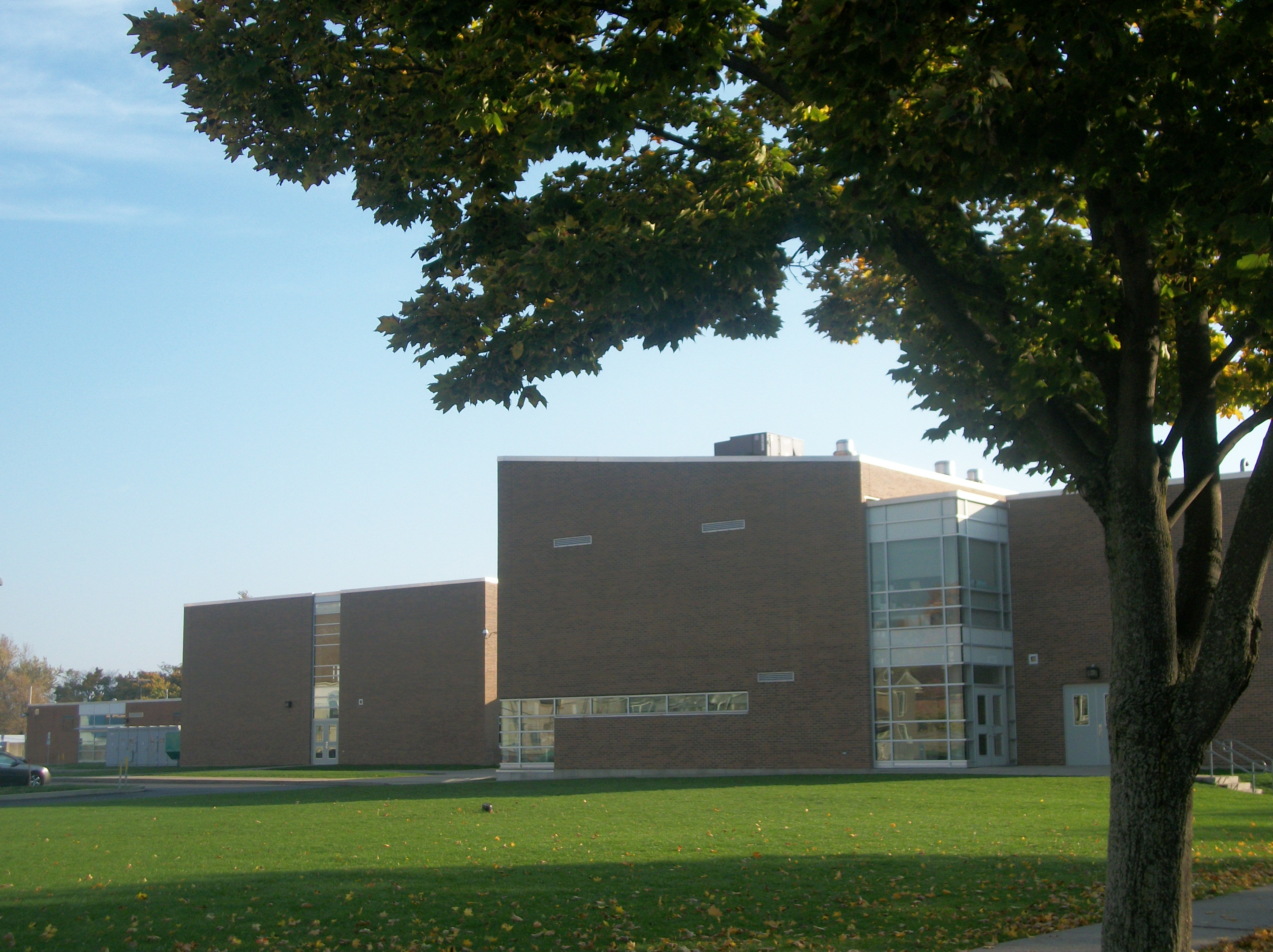

Location
- 450 Masten Avenue; Buffalo, New York 14209
- Coordinates: 42.914589°N 78.859673°W

Information
- School type: Public, magnet high school
- Founded: 1977
- School district: Buffalo Public Schools
- School number: 192
- Principal: Jody J. Covington
- Grades: 5–12
- Colors: Black and Yellow
- Website: BuffaloArtsAcademy

The Buffalo Academy for Visual and Performing Arts (BAVPA) is a magnet performing arts high school and part of Buffalo, New York's public school system. It serves grades 5-12 and requires students to apply in the field of their desired major concentration. Majors taught in the school are Dance, Media, Music, Technical Theater, Theater Arts, and Visual Arts.

BAVPA is affiliated with several community arts/performance organizations and colleges, including Hallwalls, WKBW-TV, Buffalo State University, and the University at Buffalo.

== History ==
BAVPA was founded in 1977 as a magnet school, based on a recent court order demanding that Buffalo desegregate its schools. It was originally located at School 87 (then known as Clinton Junior High School) located 333 Clinton Street in the Lower East Side of Buffalo. Due to size constraints, the school moved to its current location in 2007. The new building, located at 450 Masten Avenue in Buffalo, is the former home to Woodlawn Junior High School and Buffalo Traditional School. Prior to that, it was the site of Offermann Stadium.

=== Former Principals ===
Previous assignment and reason for departure denoted in parentheses

- Philip Lafornara–1977-1978 (Principal - unknown, died)
- Elmer J. Schamber–1978-1985 (Principal - City Honors School, retired)
- David W. Hess–1985-1991 (Assistant Principal - Riverside High School, named Acting Assistant Superintendent for Secondary Education for Buffalo Public Schools)
- Barbara A. Schnell–1991-1992 (Principal - Kensington Prep, named Principal of Buffalo Vocational Technical Center)
- Ronald L. Meer–1992-1996 (Principal - Leonardo da Vinci High School, retired)
- Deborah A. Smith–1996-2000 (Program Coordinator - Buffalo Public Schools, named Principal of Buffalo Vocational Technical Center)
- Kevin E. Kazmierczak–2000-2008 (Director of Instrumental Music Programs - Buffalo Public Schools, named Principal of Tonawanda High School)
- Darren J. Brown–2008-2011 (Principal - Community School 53, named Executive Director for Human Resources for Buffalo Public Schools)

== Notable alumni ==
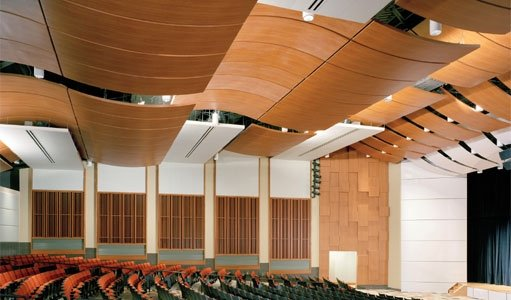
BAVPA's auditorium

- Armani Caesar
- Ani DiFranco (Class of 1986)
- Jesse L. Martin (Class of 1987)
- Robert Paterson (Class of 1988)
- Lucky Peterson
- Alexis Spight
- Sir John Barnett (Class of 2000)
