= School 87 =

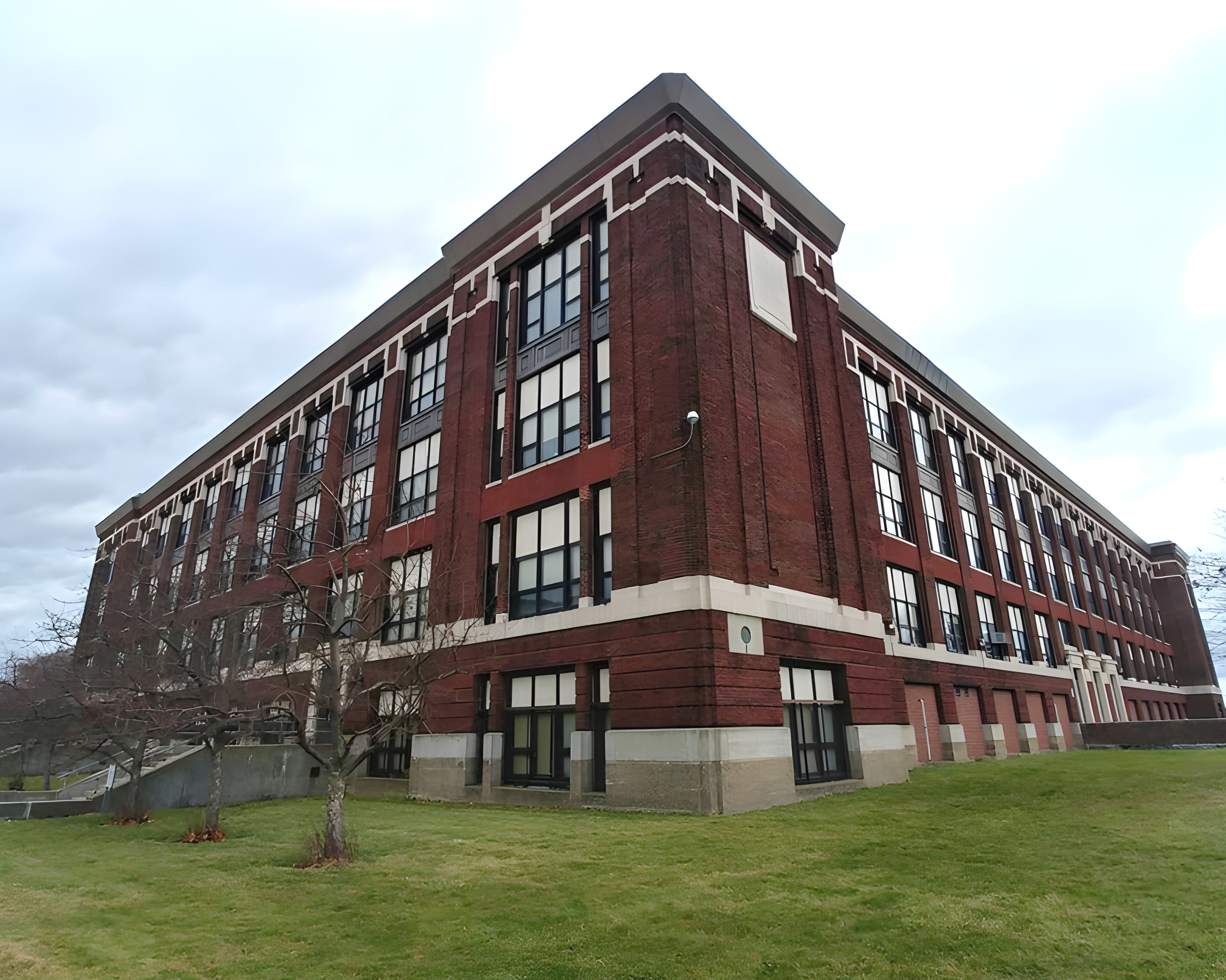

Location
- 333 Clinton Street; Willert Park; Buffalo, Erie, New York 14204
- Coordinates: 42.8828°N 78.8624°W

Information
- Opened: 1914
- Closed: 1976
- School number: 87
- Grades: 5-9

School 87 is a public school building located near Downtown Buffalo, New York, located at 333 Clinton Street. The building served as home of Hutchinson Central Technical High School and the Buffalo Academy for Visual and Performing Arts as well as a junior high school and a swing school building for other Buffalo Public Schools that were being reconstructed from 2007 to 2013. It most recently housed the Middle Early College High School.

== History ==
School 87 was constructed in 1915 to house Technical High School, which had previously been housed at 102 Elm Street in School 11. The building was unique in that it was the only public school in Buffalo history to provide its own power and electricity by way of steam generations powered by high pressure boilers. These boilers provided electricity not only for Technical High, but for School 32, located across the street from the building. In 1954, Technical High School merged with Hutchinson Central High School and moved across town.

The old Technical High building was then designated as School 87 and re-opened as Clinton Junior High School (or Clinton Center School), making it one of the first junior high schools in the city and the only one to house grades seven and eight exclusively. Clinton Junior High was one of the most segregated schools in the City of Buffalo with a very high minority enrollment and along with other East Side high schools, was a frequent site of gang and racial violence during the 1960s and 1970s. In 1976, the school was converted to the Buffalo Academy for Visual and Performing Arts as part of Buffalo's desegregation plan. Beginning with Clinton's original student body, the newly renumbered School 187 eventually became a magnet school that enrolled students from all areas of the city.

In 2007, the Arts Academy moved to a new, renovated location at 450 Masten Avenue. School 87 housed South Park High School (2007-2009), Southside Elementary School (2009-2011), and The International Preparatory School (2011-2013) while those school's regular buildings were being renovated. After being vacant for the 2013–2014 school year, the building housed Middle Early College High School for one year. Currently, the school houses Buffalo Public Schools' Department of Curriculum, Instruction, and Assessment.

=== Former principals ===
Name	Dates	Previous assignment	Reason for departure
Arthur S. Lord	1954-1962	Principal - School 47	retired
Thomas J. Connors	1962-1964	Assistant Principal - South Park High School	named Principal of South Park High School
Robert S. Wilson	1964-1965	Assistant Principal - Genesee-Humboldt Junior High School,	named Assistant Principal of South Park High School
Paul A. Parinello	1965-1967	Vice Principal - Woodlawn Junior High School	named Principal of Madison Township School
Alonzo W. Thompson	1967-1969	Vice Principal - Woodlawn Junior High School	named Principal of East High School
Joseph T. Murray	1969-1976	Vice Principal - Clinton Junior High School	named Associate Superintendent of Buffalo Public Schools
