= Middle Early College High School =

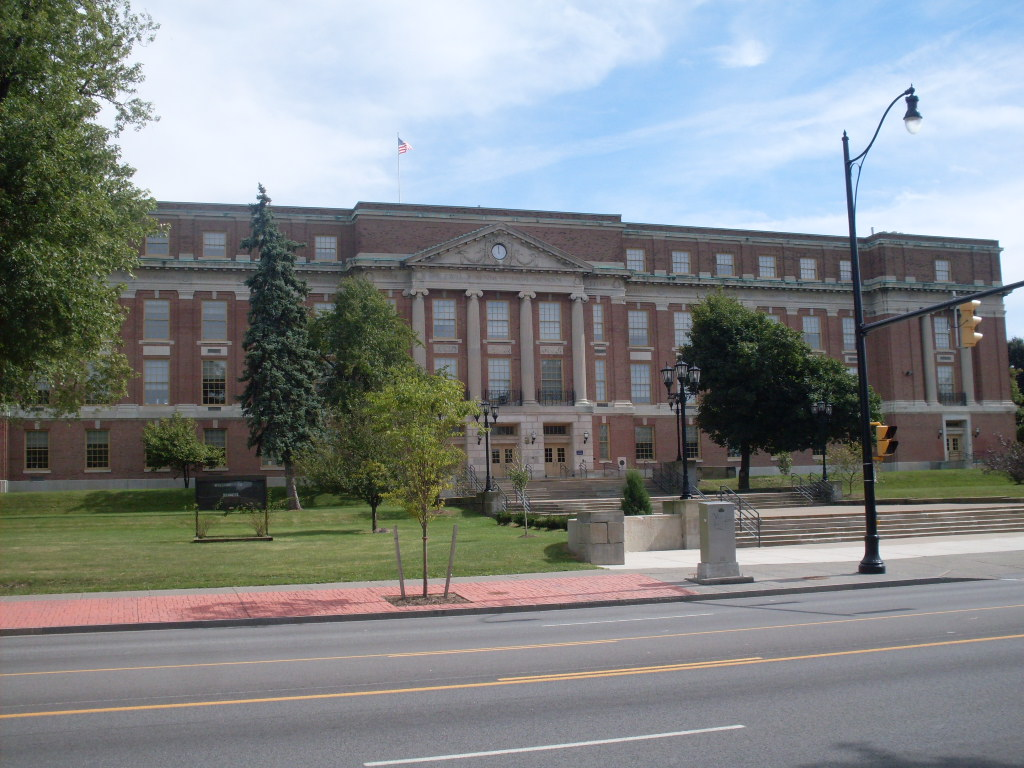

Location
- 2885 Main Street; Starin Central; Buffalo, Erie, New York 14214
- Coordinates: 42°56′38″N 78°49′56″W

Information
- Opened: 2004
- School number: 415
- Principal: David M. Potter
- Grades: 9-12
- Website: MECHS

Middle Early College High School is a magnet high school located in the City of Buffalo, New York. The school opened in September 2004 and has approximately 305 students. The current principal is David Potter.

== History ==
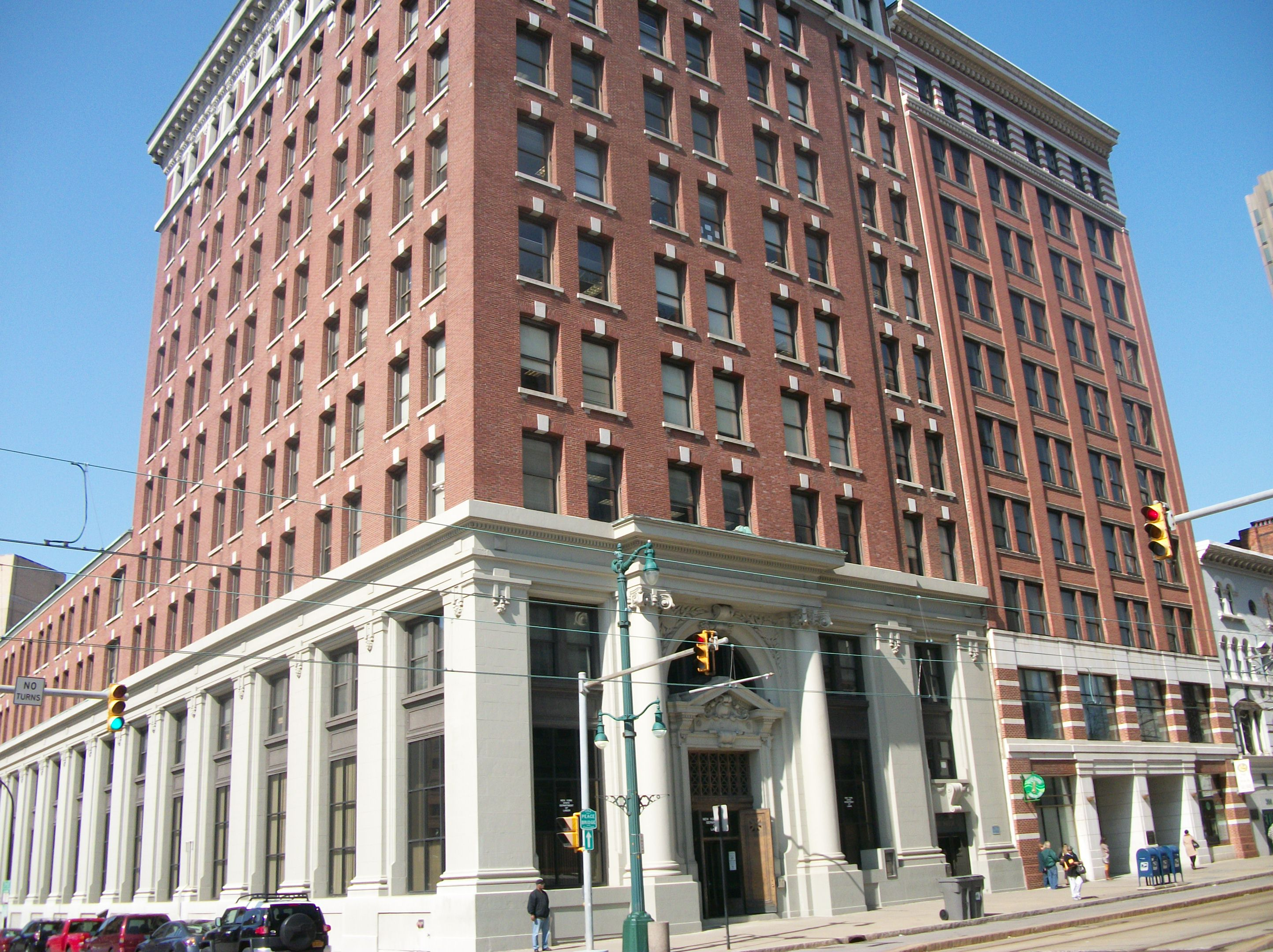
The Swan Building, where MECHS was housed from 2004 to 2014

The school opened in 2004 with students in 9th and 10th grade, adding a new grade level each year until 2009. Originally, MECHS was housed in the fourth floor of the Swan Building in Downtown Buffalo. The school moved to School 87 on Clinton Street in the Fall of 2014. In 2015, the school moved to the Bennett High School campus in North Buffalo. Beginning in 2016, Middle Early College began offering a new computer science-based school called Computing Academy of Technological Sciences.

=== Former principal ===
Previous assignment and reason for departure denoted in parentheses

- Susan M. Doyle–2004-2020 (Principal - Buffalo Traditional School, retired)

== Academics ==
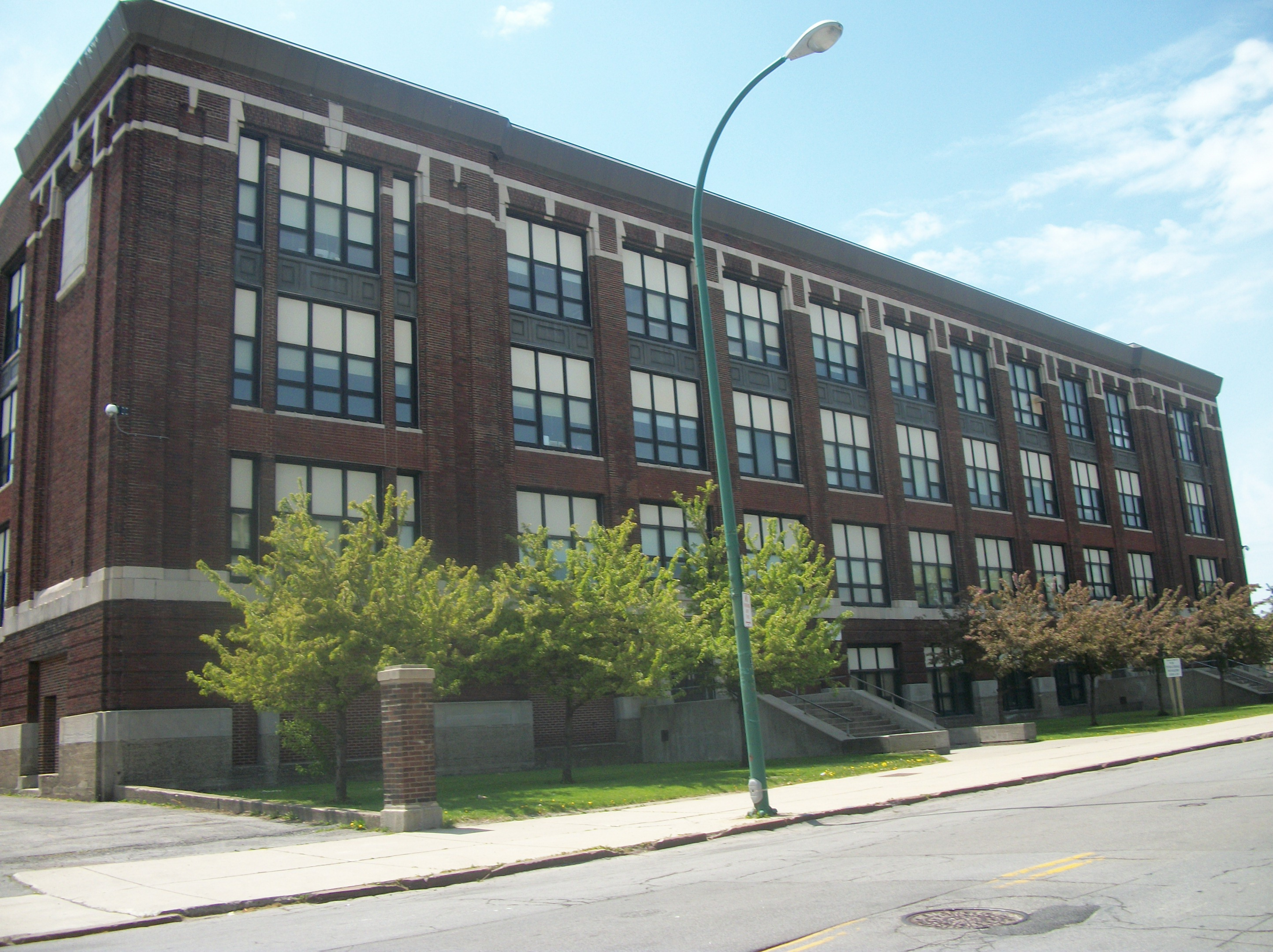
School 87, where MECHS was housed for the 2014–2015 school year.

Middle Early College houses students from Grades 9–12. Students must attend the school for five years instead of the traditional four years. There is an exception for students who are advanced and can graduate within the traditional four years. Students graduate with both a high school diploma and an associate degree from Erie Community College in either Criminal Justice, Building and Trades, Office Technology, or Business Administration. Classes at MECHS use block scheduling in which Monday/Wednesday/Friday classes are 64 minutes in length, and Tuesday/Thursday classes are 98 minutes. The students have use of the science labs, library, gym facilities, and pool at the college.
