= Math, Science, Technology Preparatory School =

High school in New York, United States

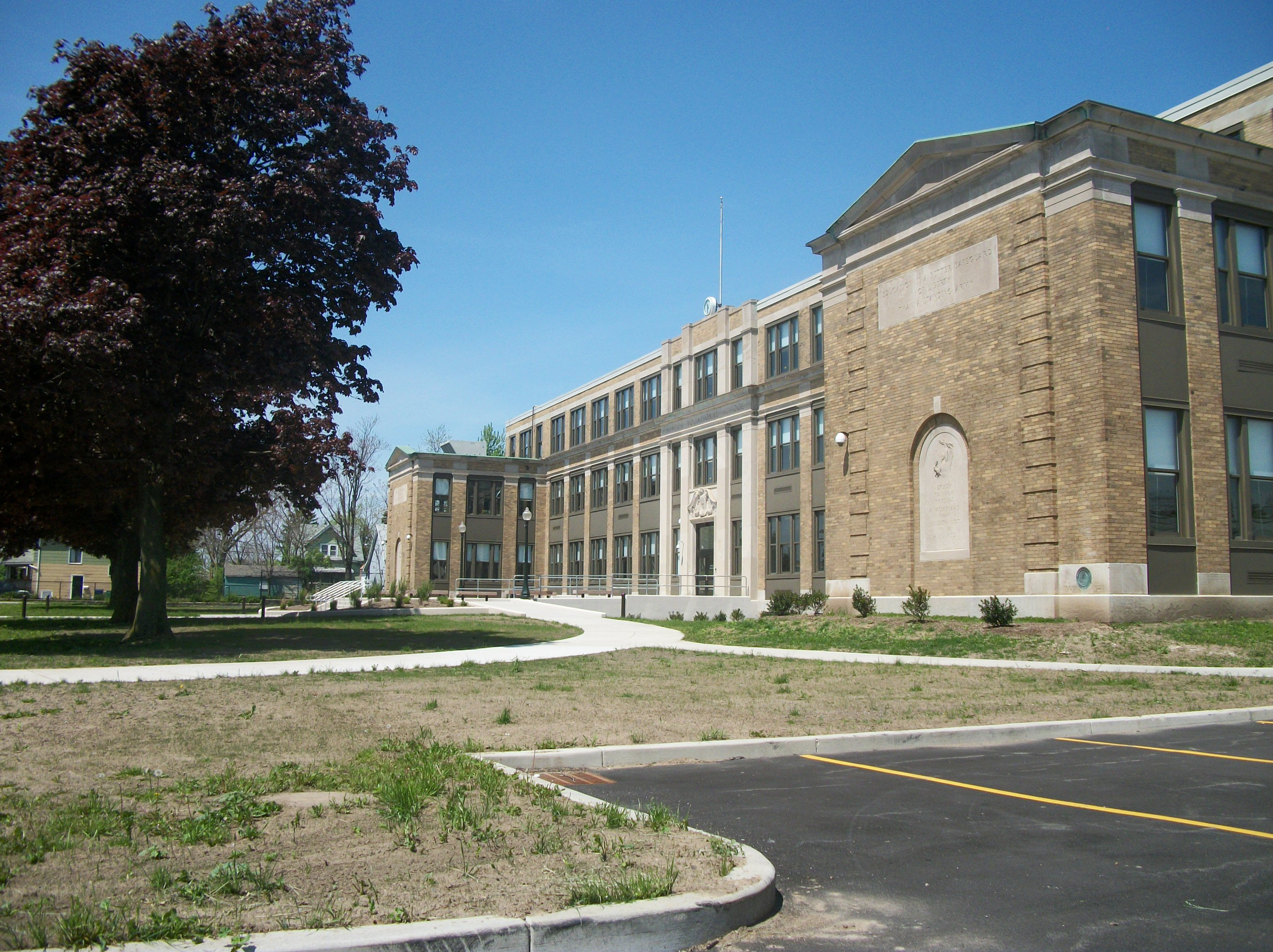

Location
- 666 East Delavan Avenue; East Side; Buffalo, Erie County, New York 14215; United States; 42.92295°N 78.83224°W

Information
- Type: Preparation School
- Opened: 2006
- Status: Comprehensive Support & Improvement
- School district: Buffalo Public Schools
- Superintendent: Dr. Tonja M. Williams
- School number: 197
- NCES School ID: 360585005857
- Principal: Danielle Womack
- Grades: 9-12
- Language: English
- Colors: Green, Gray, Black
- Slogan: "Whatever you do, let it be done well."
- Song: "I'm a student at MST"
- Budget: 500,000 (est)
- School fees: 7
- Website: MST Prep

Math, Science, and Technology Preparatory School is a magnet middle/high school located in the City of Buffalo, New York. the first preparatory school in Western New York and the third in New York State. The school opened in September 2006 and has approximately 387 students. The current principal is Ms. Danielle Womack.

== Academics ==
MSTP (Math Science and Technology Preparatory School) enrolls students from 9th through 12th grade. MSTP is a public school in the Buffalo Public School district, and is part of the school district's school choice program. Accelerated programs begin in fifth grade, and by 12th grade all students are expected to have passed at least two AP classes. MSTP had its first graduating class in 2010. 100% of 2010 graduates were accepted into college.

== The Funding ==
The school is funded by the Bill & Melinda Gates Foundation and The Michael & Susan Dell Foundation who gave around half a million dollars. MSTP is a College Board school, and all of its faculty and staff have been through extensive training through college board.

== History ==
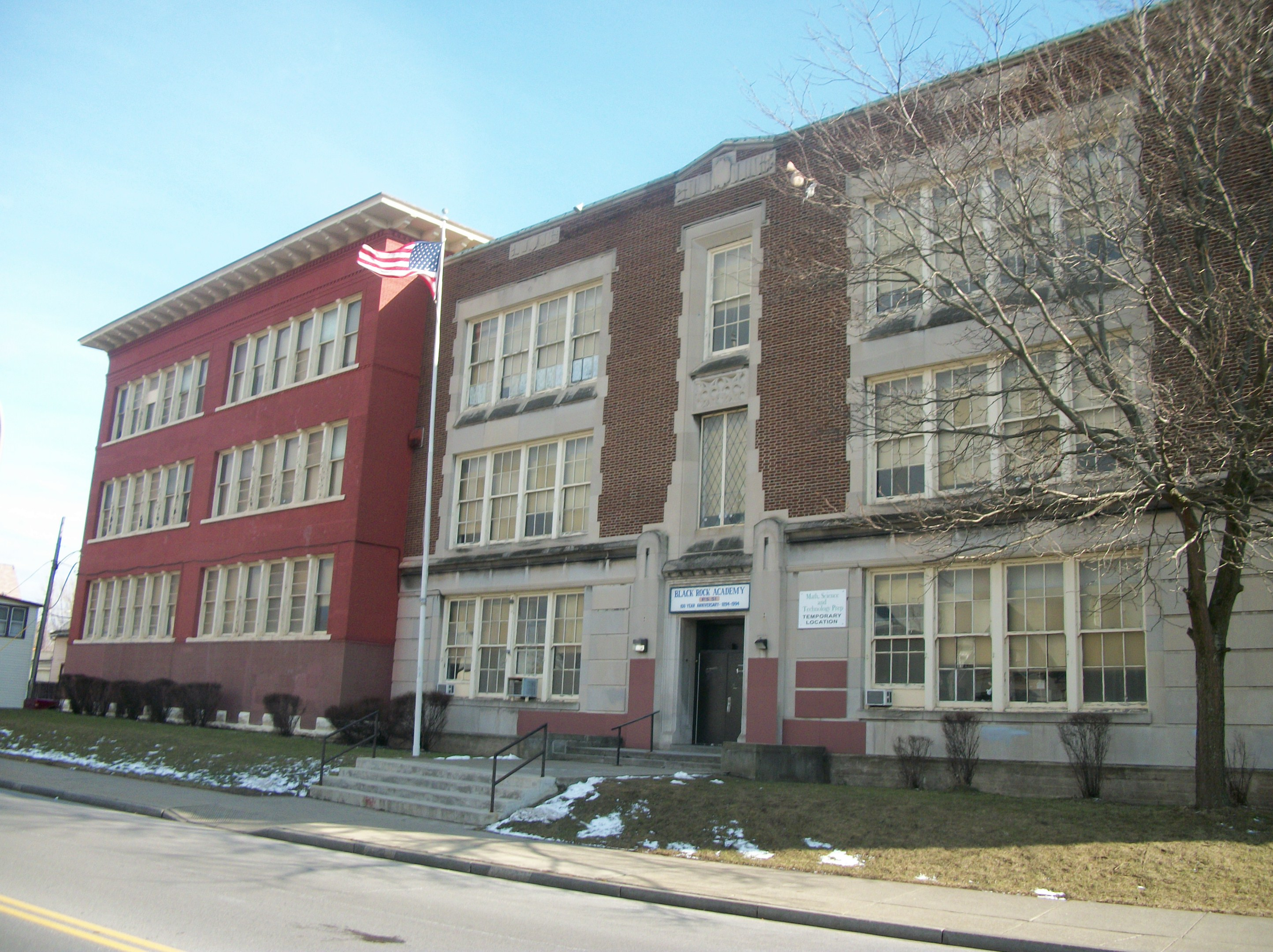
School 51, where MST Prep was temporarily housed from 2010 to 2012.

The school opened in 2006 in a building that formerly housed Seneca Vocational High School. It is a College Board school that began accepting students and sixth and ninth grade and since added two grades each year.

The Seneca campus was renovated from 2010 until 2012. During this time, the school was temporarily located at the site of former Public School 51 Black Rock Academy while renovations were made to the Seneca building. The Seneca building reopened in Fall 2012.

In Fall 2016, Grades 5 through 8 moved to the former Dr. Martin Luther King Multicultural Institute at 487 High Street. The MST building also housed the new Research Laboratory High School for the 2016–2017 school year.

=== Former principals ===
Previous assignment and reason for departure denoted in parentheses

- Ms. Pamela D. Rutland–2006-2008 (Principal - Community School 53, named Principal of Wilson Magnet High School)
- Ms. Rose M. Schneider–2008-2014 (Assistant Principal - Hutchinson Central Technical High School, assigned to East High School)
- Mr. Todd B. Miklas–2014-2017 (Principal - Lorraine Elementary School, named Principal of Gowanda Middle School)
- Mr. Derek M. Baker–2017-2018 (Assistant Principal - Math, Science, Technology Preparatory School, named Principal of Sweet Home Middle School)

=== Former administrators ===
Year	Superintendent	Principal
2006-2007	James Williams	Pam Rutland
2007-2008	James Williams	Pam Rutland
2008-2009	James Williams	Rose Schneider
2009-2010	James Williams	Rose Schneider
2010-2011	James Williams	Rose Schneider
2011-2012	Amber Dixon*	Rose Schneider
2012-2013	Pam Brown	Rose Schneider
2013-2014	Pam Brown	Rose Schneider
2014-2015	Don Ogilvie*	Todd Miklas
2015-2016	Kriner Cash	Todd Miklas
2016-2017	Kriner Cash	Todd Miklas
2017-2018	Kriner Cash	Derek Baker
2018-2019	Kriner Cash	Kevin Eberle
2019-2020	Kriner Cash	Kevin Eberle
2019-2020	Kriner Cash	Kevin Eberle
2020-2021	Kriner Cash	Kevin Eberle
2021-2022	Tanja Williams	Kevin Eberle
2022-2023	Tanja Williams	Danielle Womack

== School 196 @ 39 Annex ==
MST Prep @ 39

Location
- 487 High Street; Medical Park; Buffalo, Erie County, New York 14211; United States

Information
- Type: Preparation School
- School district: Buffalo Public Schools
- Principal: Bethany L. Brown
- Vice Principal: Christopher M. Spence
- Grades: 5-8
- Average class size: 30
- Website: MST Prep @ 39

MST Prep 196 @ 39 is a junior high school annex located at the former School 39 on High Street on the East Side of Buffalo. It opened in 2016 to better accommodate the needs of younger students. The school houses Grades 5–8. The current principal is Mrs. Bethany Schill-Brown.

=== Former principal ===
Previous assignment and reason for departure denoted in parentheses

- Mr. Michael J. Mogavero–2018-2019 (Principal - Lafayette High School, placed on assignment)
