= Lewis J. Bennett School of Innovative Technology =

Lewis J. Bennett High School of Innovative Technology

Location
- 2885 Main St; Buffalo, New York 14214; United States; 42°56′38″N 78°49′56″W

Information
- Type: Public
- Established: 2016
- School district: Buffalo Public Schools
- School number: 363
- NCES School ID: 360585006611
- Principal: Fred Sales
- Teaching staff: 50.21 (on an FTE basis)
- Grades: 9-12
- Enrollment: 469 (2024-2025)
- Student to teacher ratio: 9.34
- Campus: City: Large
- Colors: Blue and Orange
- Mascot: Tigers
- Yearbook: Beacon
- Website: www.buffaloschools.org/o/ps363

The Lewis J. Bennett High School of Innovative Technology (formerly known as Computing Academy of Technological Sciences and C.A.T.S.) is an American high school located in Buffalo, New York. Opening in 2016, the school focuses on computer science education to students. Presently, the school is housed at the Bennett High School campus. The current principal is Carlos Alvarez.

== History ==
Lewis J. Bennett High School opened as Computing Academy of Technological Sciences in 2016 to replace Bennett High School, which was being phased out due to low academic performance. It opened in 2016 to an enrollment of 102 students.

=== Former principal ===
Previously assignment and reason for departure noted in parentheses

- Susan M. Doyle – 2016-2017 (Principal - Middle Early College High School, returned to position)

== Academics ==
Bennett High School of Technology offers a broad-based education in computer science as well as a general education program that teaches to the New York States Board of Regents standards. Students choose to focus from multiple areas of study, including graphic design and animation, software development, and networking and hardware. Specific classes include software engineering, computer networking, animation, gaming, coding, mobile application design, digital design, computer hardware, web design, information systems, and computer programming.
