= Connie Porter =

American children's writer

Connie Rose Porter (born July 29, 1959) is an African-American writer of young-adult books, and a teacher of creative writing. Porter is best known for her contribution to the American Girl Collection Series as the author of the Addy books: six of her Addy books have gone on to sell more than 3 million copies. In addition, she published two novels with Houghton-Mifflin, All-Bright Court (1991), and Imani All Mine (1999).

== Early life ==
Porter spent her childhood and youth growing up in Lackawanna, New York, a small city just outside Buffalo in the Baker Housing project with her family. Her parents, who survived the Great Depression, raised a family of ten, the children spread 23 years apart, and lived on a meager fixed income, experiencing hard times. Porter describes herself as an anxious and quiet child who liked to read, enjoying the works of Lois Lenski and Beverly Cleary.

As she became a teenager, Porter became more interested in works by black writers and about black characters. At age 14, she started writing. When she first told her mother she wanted to be a writer, Porter's mother dismissed her: "My mother didn't pay me any attention. She was cooking". However, Porter's parent's gave her a type writer as a Christmas gift when she was in 10th grade and she started to write poetry. "Inspired by her readings of Nikki Giovanni, she first wrote poetry that was angry and admittedly awful, but that was important to her growing cultural awareness". She graduated high school at Buffalo City Honors School, and then moved on to earn her bachelor's degree from State University of New York at Albany (1981) and a Masters of Fine Arts at Louisiana State University (LSU) (1987). She has also taught creative writing at Emerson College, Southern Illinois University—Carbondale, and Milton Academy in Massachusetts where she started writing her first novel.

== Career ==
=== All Bright Court ===
All Bright Court grew out of a short story assignment Porter had to do at LSU. It gave her a chance to write about the area where she grew up and the steel industry, an interest of hers. All-Bright Court is about the story of Southern Blacks who move to a Northern town to pursue greater job opportunities and a better life. It centers around the Taylor family and their neighbors living in a low-income apartment complex. However, they find out that through frequent layoffs, dangerous working conditions, their new life is not all they hoped it would be. Despite the living conditions and the new hardships they unknowingly traded for, the tenants and friends foster a sense of community. The New York Times reviewer Michiko Kakutani commented that, "Though her prose is often lyrical, even poetic, [Porter] does not shirk from showing the reader the harsh reality of her characters' daily lives. . . . Indeed, the emotional power of All-Bright Court resides in her finely rendered characters, people who come alive for the reader as individuals one has known firsthand". All-Bright Court was her debut novel.

=== Addy Series ===
The Addy Series are based on the American Girl doll of the same name, one of the original Historical Characters. Pleasant Company, the owner of American Girl, approached Porter to write the series. The books follow Addy Walker, a young enslaved girl who runs away with her mother to freedom in Philadelphia during the American Civil War. There, she grows up and faces challenges in the urban North, such as learning to read and discrimination. To prepare for writing a novel with the heavy issue of slavery as the basis of the book, Ms. Porter did extensive research about 1864 to accurately portray the era and environment to help the reader achieve a real sense of being in 1864. "As a writer, you have to put yourself in the place of other people and other worlds". She also refused to negotiate on the book's slavery theme, which caused some controversy. Porter also tried to accurately portray the hardships surrounding slavery in a way that would engage her readers and not alienate them. "Slavery is difficult for even adults to talk about...I didn't want to portray slavery as everyone on a porch or wearing beautiful clothes. It was a very awful period, but we're also talking about people who had loving families". When Addy was introduced in 1993, over 1 million books were sold, Porter's popularity soared and more than 15,000 came to meet her. The Addy novels have sold more than 3 million copies.

=== Imani All Mine ===
Imani All Mine is Porter's second adult novel. Released in 1998 after the first six Addy books, the novel is the coming of age tale of Tasha, a black 15-year-old girl growing up in Buffalo, New York, an honors student who wants to go to college to escape her inner city life. However, her plans takes an unexpected turn when she becomes pregnant after a rape. When the baby girl is born, Tasha names her daughter Imani. As she tries to raise Imani, she struggles to be a good mother in a dangerous environment filled with drugs, gangs, poverty, and bigotry while also dealing with common teenage problems such as sexuality and her mother's new white boyfriend.

== Awards and honors ==
Porter has been named a fellow to Bread Load Writers' Conference . She was also awarded a regional winner in Grants Best Young American Novelist Competition. All-Bright Court became an American Library Association Best Book of 1991 and a New York Times Notable Book. The Addy Series was voted Best Children's Series of 1993 in the annual Publishers Weekly Cuffie Awards. She has sold over 4.5 million books. Her books have also won the 1994 International Reading Association Children's Choice Award and the 1994 Children's Book Council Children's Choice Award. She herself was presented with the Uncrowned Queens Culture Keeper Award after giving a presentation at Slee Auditorium in Buffalo, New York.

== Personal life ==
Porter considers herself a black female writer, incorporating the intersectionality of her identities into her work. "I surely have been black and female all my life and now, because I am a writer, I do not want to stop describing myself in that way. I do not fear that, because there is some descriptive tag before the word "writer," I will be pigeonholed. Racism and sexism are what can pigeonhole you. They can limit, even stop you. Not describing myself as a black woman will not prevent that from happening"

At one point, Porter lived in Pittsburgh with her mother and 18 month old daughter. She has had experience teaching 9th grade. She is very interested in science, at one point wanting to be a physicist, an oceanographer, or a marine biologist. She still reads science books for relaxation, and listens and sings along to Broadway show tunes. She received the whole Addy doll collection from American Girl because she writes the series.

Additional authors she admires are Langston Hughes, Nella Larsen, Richard Wright, Louise Meriwether, Rosa Guy, Maya Angelou, Toni Morrison, Jean Toomer, Ralph Ellison, Gabriel García Márquez, Alice Walker, Gloria Naylor, and Terry McMillan.

== List of published books ==
- All-Bright Court (1991)
- Meet Addy: An American Girl (1993)
- Addy Learns a Lesson: A school story (1993)
- Addy's Surprise: A Christmas story (1993)
- Happy Birthday, Addy!: A springtime story (1994)
- Addy Saves the Day: A summer story (1994)
- Changes for Addy: A winter story (1994)
- Imani All Mine (1999)
- High Hopes for Addy (1999)
- Addy's Little Brother (2000)
- Addy's Wedding Quilt (2001)
- Addy Studies Freedom (2002)
- Addy's Summer Place (2003)
