= Native American Magnet School =

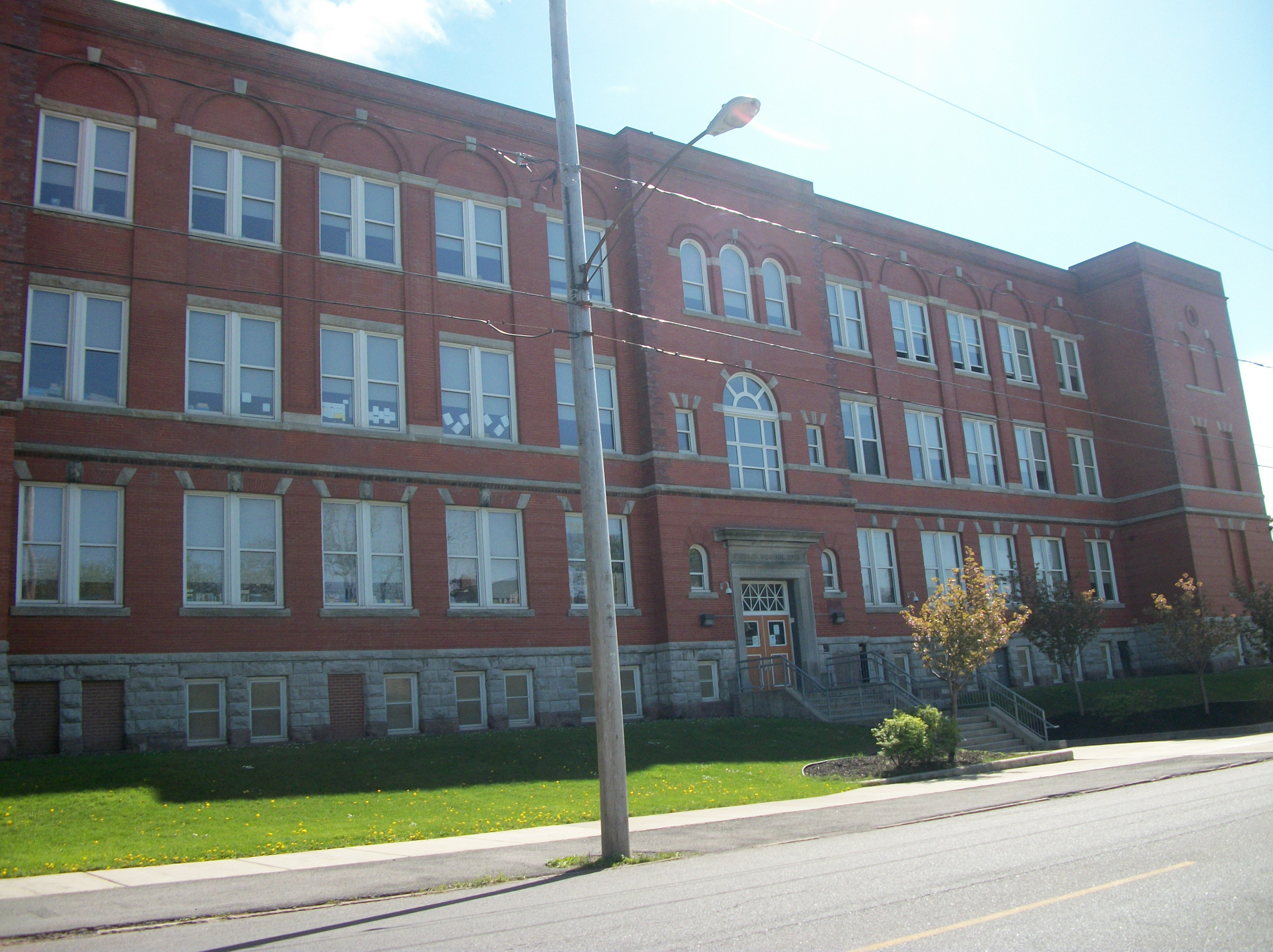

Location
- 97 W Delavan Avenue; Buffalo, Erie County, New York 14213; United States
- Coordinates: 42°55′18.08″N 78°53′44.93″W

Information
- School type: Public
- Status: Open
- School district: Buffalo Public Schools
- NCES School ID: 360585000324
- Principal: Michael Suwala
- Website: www.buffaloschools.org/o/ps19

Native American Magnet is an elementary school that serves grades K–8 in the West Side of Buffalo.

== History ==
The school was established in 1976 to push Native Americans into a public school and lower dropout rates in Native Americans in Buffalo. It was one of the first magnet schools in New York to be based on ethnicity.

The school has hosted many Native American cultural celebrations.

During its time open, the school established playgrounds for after school hours.
