= The Charles Finney School =

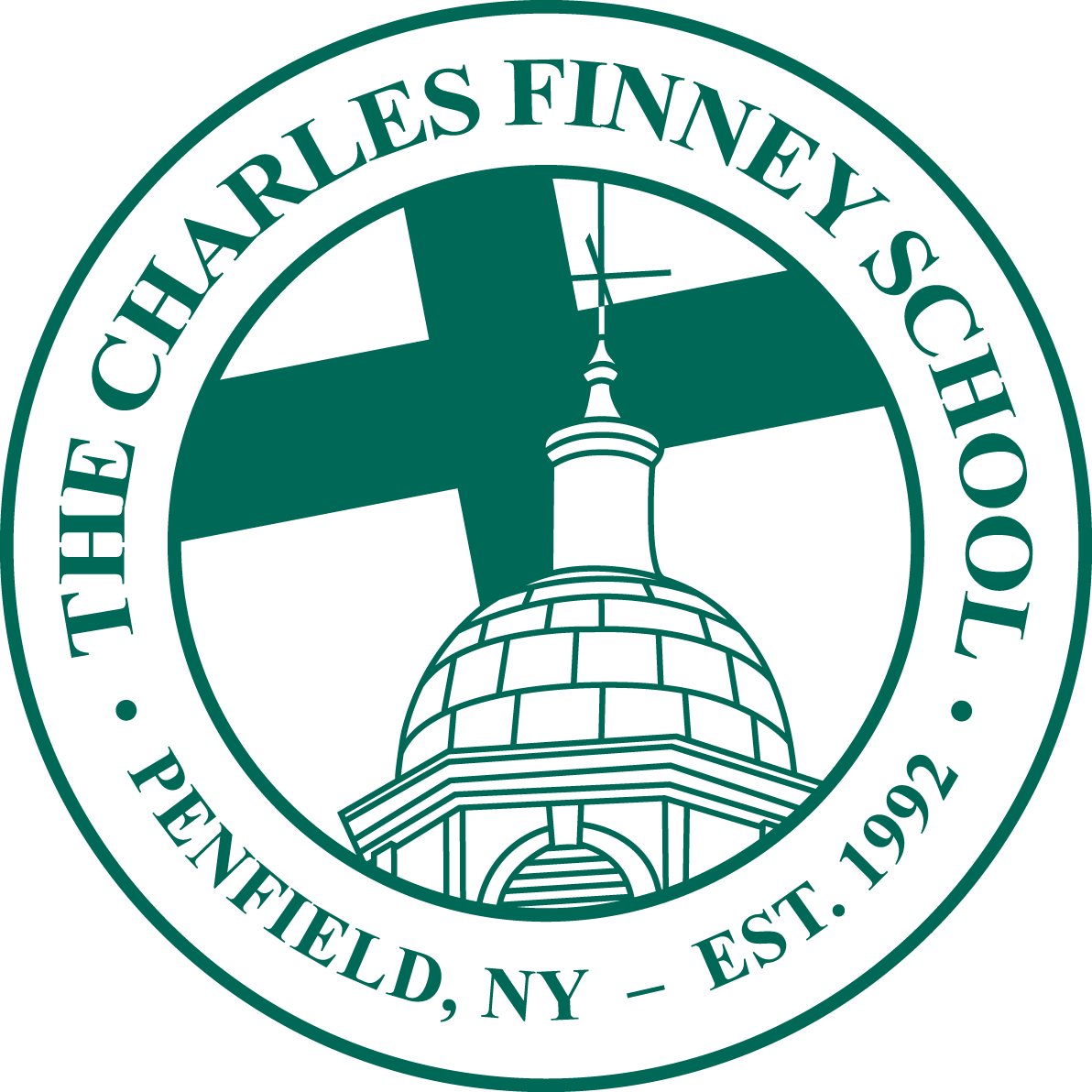

Location
- 2070 Five Mile Line Road; Penfield, New York 14526; United States; 43°7′59″N 77°28′36″W

Information
- Type: Independent, college preparatory, Christian, private school
- Motto: Do Something Greater
- Established: 1992
- President: Michael VanLeeuwen
- Chairman: Arnold Smeenk
- Chaplain: Randy Catalano and Stephanie Sylvester
- Grades: Pre-K through 12th
- Enrollment: 521
- Campus: Suburban
- Colors: Green and gold
- Athletics: Section V NYSPHSAA, Private-Parochial League
- Mascot: Falcon
- Accreditation: Middle States Association of Colleges and Schools and Association of Christian Schools International
- Student:Faculty Ratio: 18:1
- Annual Tuition: $3,113 (Pre-K) – $10,494 (High school)
- Website: finneyschool.org

The Charles Finney School is a private, non-denominational Christian school offering a college preparatory program to students from Pre-Kindergarten through Grade 12. The school has developed a reputation for both student outreach and as a strong competitor, despite its small size. Finney is accredited by both the Middle States Association of Colleges and Schools and the Association of Christian Schools International and is the only school in the Greater Rochester, New York region to have achieved both. Finney students come from 24 school districts in the region, as well as from nine countries through the school's International Student Program.

== History ==
Established in 1992, the school was named after Charles Grandison Finney, the Second Great Awakening evangelist who led a revival in Rochester in 1830–1831 that had a significant impact on the city. The school was founded by seven area churches: New Covenant Fellowship, Faith Temple, Bethel Christian Fellowship, Cornerstone Fellowship (now Rochester Vineyard), Faith Christian Center, Spencerport Assembly of God, and Covenant Life Fellowship. Two Christian schools were also merged to create Finney: New Covenant Christian School and Faith Temple Christian Schools.

In October 2005, Norman Leenhouts, a noted Rochester business leader and co-founder of Home Properties, was appointed as chairman of the board and continued in that role until his death in 2017.

For the 2016–2017 school year, The Charles Finney School reported a record opening enrollment of 370 students.

== Campus ==
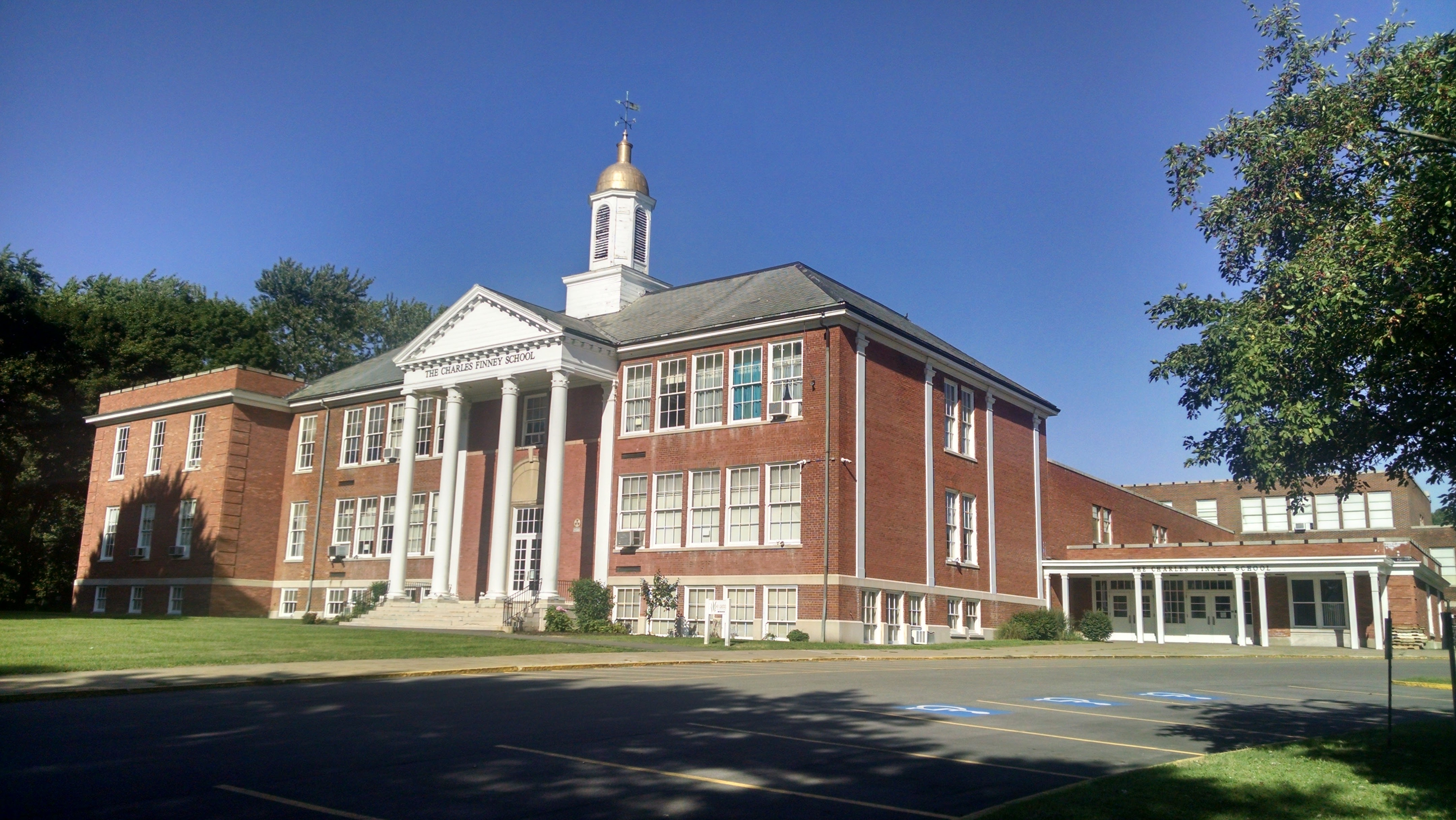

The school is located on over 8 acres in the suburb of Penfield, New York and is divided into 3 school levels: elementary, middle, and high school. Each level has their own sections in the building while still sharing main areas, such as the auditorium, gym, and cafeteria. The property includes an athletic complex, construction of which was started in the spring of 2016 and which was funded in part by an anonymous $1 million gift.

The school building was originally built as Penfield High School and later served as Denonville Junior High School and New Covenant Fellowship Church before being obtained by The Charles Finney School.

== Athletics ==
Finney participates in New York State Public High School Athletic Association (NYSPHSAA) Section V interscholastic athletics and is also a member of the Private-Parochial League. In a unique arrangement, the football team is actually composed of students from two schools: Finney and Northstar Christian Academy in Gates, New York. The two schools, rivals in other sports, have been cooperating in football since 2011.

=== Athletic teams ===
Interscholastic Athletic Teams
| Sport | Level | Season | Gender |
|---|---|---|---|
| Baseball | V | Spring | Boys |
| Basketball | V, JV, M | Winter | Boys, Girls |
| Cross Country | V | Fall | Boys, Girls |
| Soccer | V, JV, M | Fall | Boys, Girls |
| Softball | V, JV, M | Spring | Girls |
| Track (outdoor) | V, M | Spring | Co-ed |
| Volleyball | V, JV, M | Fall | Girls |
| Football | V, JV | Fall | Boys |

- V = Varsity, JV = Junior Varsity, M = Modified

=== Athletic accomplishments ===
- Two NY State Boys Basketball Championships
- Six Section V Boys Basketball Championships
- One Section V Girls Basketball Championship
- One Section V Girls Soccer Championship
- Two Section V Boys Soccer Championships
- Two Section V Girls Cheerleading Championships
- One Section V Boys Golf Championship

== International program ==
The Charles Finney School has an active international student program, giving both local and international students opportunities to broaden their global perspectives and increase cultural understanding. Finney has welcomed students from all over the world, including China, Spain, Italy, Russia, South Korea, Cayman Islands, Panama, Brazil, and Germany.

== Extra-curricular activities ==
=== Project Compassion ===
Students involved with the extra-curricular program Project Compassion have traveled 55,140 miles bringing "acts of compassion" to people in New York, New Jersey, Pennsylvania, Tennessee, Arkansas, Kentucky, Louisiana, Oklahoma, Maryland, North Carolina, Missouri, Ohio, Michigan, and the countries of Malawi, Mexico, and Haiti. Project Compassion outreaches are inspired by Jesus, who "did not come to be served, but to serve" (Matthew 20:28). Since September 2012, students have completed over 1,000 "acts of compassion" and served on 23 missions trips, impacting 3,200 people.

=== FIRST Robotics ===
FIRST Robotics Team 1405 was founded in 2003 at The Charles Finney School. The team has competed internationally twice—in 2013 and in 2016.

Robotics awards:

- Winner – 2004 Chesapeake Regional
- Winner – 2013 Finger Lakes Regional
- Imagery Award – 2015 Finger Lakes Regional
- Finalist – 2016 FIRST Championship
- Winner – 2016 Finger Lakes Regional
- Creativity Award – 2016 Finger Lakes Regional

== Equality ==
In September 2022, the school decided to change its policy and reserves the right to discontinue enrollment of LGBTQ students. The 2022 - 2023 Student Handbook addresses discrimination, but only racial.
