= Sidney High School (New York) =

Coordinates: 42.3040°N 75.3864°W

Location
- 95 W Main Street; Sidney, New York 13838; United States

Information
- School district: Sidney Central School District
- Principal: Eben Bullock
- Teaching staff: 21.02 (FTE)
- Enrollment: 321 (2018–19)
- Student to teacher ratio: 15.27
- Colors: Maroon and White
- Team name: Sabers
- Website: http://sidney.shs.schoolfusion.us/

Sidney High School is a public secondary school in Sidney, New York, approximately 30 miles north of Binghamton. The school is known primarily for its athletics programs, music, and Slam poetry contest.

== History ==
The Sidney Union School served high school students prior to a separate high school being constructed in 1892.

== Campus ==
Sidney Junior/ Senior High School is located on the same campus as the elementary school, all of which comprise the Sidney Central School District.

== Extracurricular activities ==
=== Sports ===
The school has a rich history in athletics. Sidney competes in the Midstate Athletic Conference (MAC). Sidney has three NYSPHSAA Boys' Basketball State Championships (1976, 1998, 2007), one Field Hockey NYS Championship (1991) and one Football NYS Championship (2005). The school has also produced individual Section IV and NYS Championships in Boys' and Girls' Track and Wrestling. In 1990, Jennifer Finnegan won a National Title for the Mile Run for winter track.

== Notable alumni ==
- James Axtell, historian
- Marc Cerbone, professional baseball player
