= South Park High School (Buffalo, New York) =

Location
- 150 Southside Pkwy; Buffalo, New York 14220; United States; 42°51′10.6″N 78°49′27.3″W

Information
- Type: Public
- School district: Buffalo Public Schools
- School number: 206
- NCES School ID: 360585000378
- Principal: Michael T. Morris
- Teaching staff: 75.53 (on an FTE basis)
- Grades: 9-12
- Enrollment: 801 (2024-2025)
- Student to teacher ratio: 10.61
- Campus: City: Large
- Colors: Red and Black
- Mascot: Sparky the Bear
- Team name: Sparks
- Newspaper: The Spark
- Yearbook: The Dial
- Website: www.buffaloschools.org/o/ps206

South Park High School is a high school located in Buffalo, New York. It serves Grades 9 - 12 and teaches according to the Board of Regents. The current principal is Michael Morris.

== History ==
South Park is located in South Buffalo. It was organized and built in 1914. For its first year, the school was temporarily housed at School 36. It was designed by architect Edward Brodhead Green.

From 2007 to 2009, South Park High School was renovated and the school was temporarily housed at School 187, which formerly housed Buffalo Academy for Visual and Performing Arts. South Park High School's building reopened in 2009.

=== Annexes ===
Beginning in the 1930s, South Park High began opening up annexes in other school buildings due to the excessive student body account. The first annex was opened in 1932 at School 67, with a second being opened a few years later at School 72, and a third at School 69 in 1936. The following year, the School 72 and 69 annexes were closed and replaced by the School 7 annex. In 1941, both the School 7 and School 67 annexes were closed and all students attended the main building. School 67 would later be revived as an annex in the late 1960s and continued to operate as such until the early 1990s.

=== Alumni ===
- Rose Bampton - opera singer (Class of 1925)
- Jody Fortson - NFL player
- Joe Gallagher - professional baseball player
- Brian Higgins - Congressman of New York State's 27th District (Class of 1978)
- C. Wade McClusky - Rear Admiral USN, pilot at the Battle of Midway (Class of 1918)
- Warren Spahn - professional baseball player
