= East High School (Buffalo, New York) =

Coordinates: 42.907469°N 78.836818°W

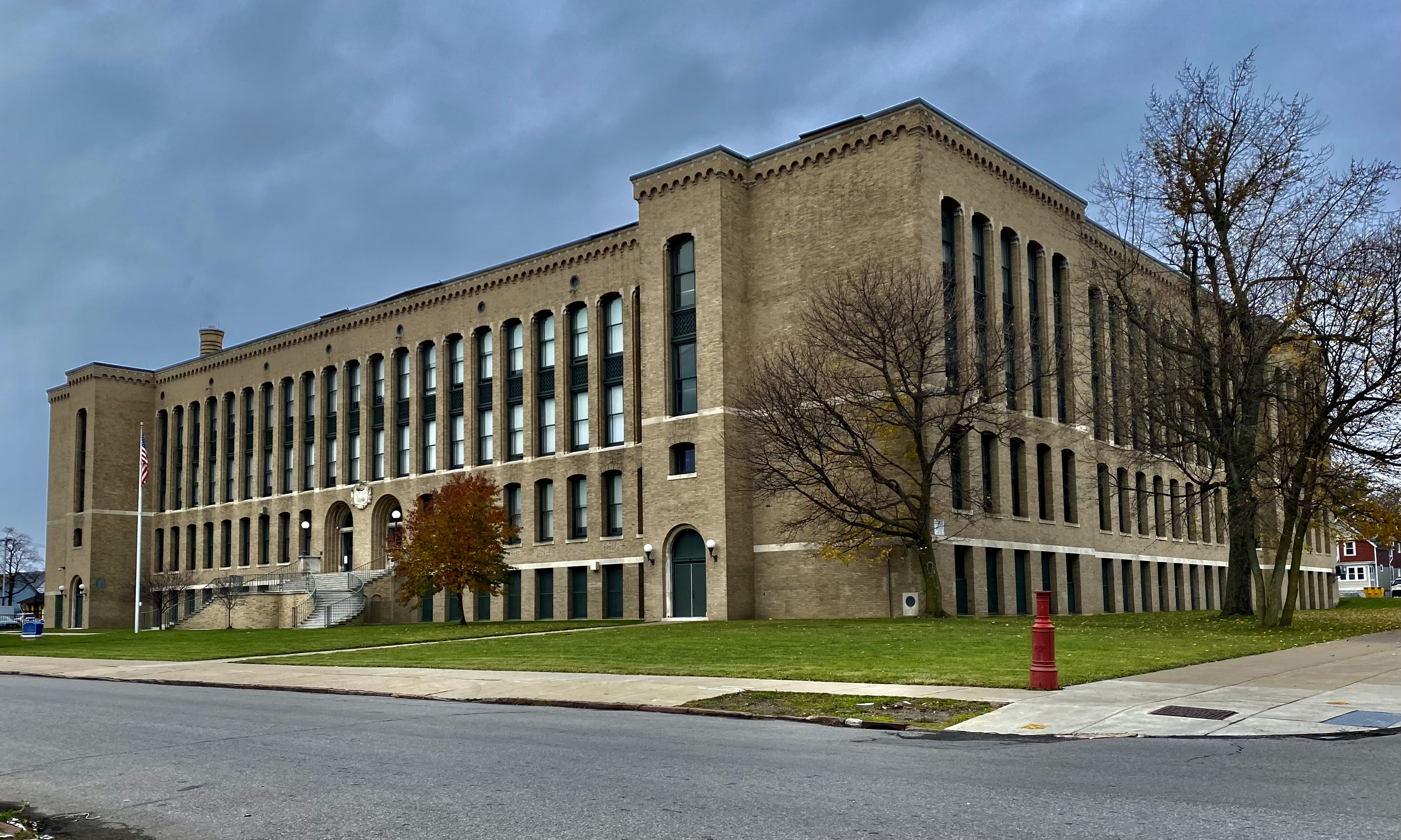
- East High School in November 2021

Location
- 820 Northampton Street; Buffalo, NY; Humboldt Park; Buffalo, Erie County, New York 14211; United States

Information
- Type: Public, Coeducational
- Opened: 1927
- Closed: 2018
- School district: Buffalo Public Schools
- School number: 307
- Grades: 9-12
- Colors: Black and Gold
- Team name: East High Panthers
- Yearbook: The Orient

East High School was a comprehensive high school located in the East Side of Buffalo, New York. It operated from 1927 until 1977, reopened in 2005 and closed again in 2018 due to low academic performance. East High began phasing out in 2015 and was replaced by East Community High School and Pathways Academy, which are both housed in the building.

== History ==
East High School (originally known as "East Side High School") was constructed in 1926 and opened in 1927. The building was a neighborhood school that served the Lower East Side families. The building became a symbol of rising demographic changes in the East Side when increasing numbers of African-Americans joined the student enrollment. In 1954, as part of a large redistricting initiative by the Buffalo Board of Education, East High's boundaries were redrawn so that it became "Buffalo's Negro high school".

In 1977, the school was closed due to a federal desegregation order and became Buffalo Vocational Technical Center, where students took vocational and career-oriented classes in addition to the core academics at their regular high school. This also allowed the school to become an annex to Kensington, Riverside, and Emerson High Schools. The school was close to being closed and transformed into an elementary/middle school campus in 1999, but that decision was revoked by the Buffalo Board of Education due to mounting public pressure. In 2002, the Vocational center was ultimately closed, and the building re-opened in 2005 once again as East High School.

In the spring of 2011, it was proposed that the current principal be replaced and the school would become an all-male school. Although the principal was placed on assignment within the district offices, no student demographic changes occurred. Beginning in 2015, the East High School program began to phase out due to low test scores and graduation rates. The program was replaced by a student credit recovery alternative education program known as Pathways Academy, and a new high school known as East Community High School.

=== Former principals ===
Previous assignment and reason for departure denoted in parentheses

- Charles J. Costello–1927-1948 (Vice Principal - Hutchinson Central Technical High School, retired)
- Victor J. Kless–1948-1952 (Vice Principal - East High School, died)
- William H. Davenport–1952-1961 (Vice Principal - Kensington High School, retired)
- Robert J. Rentz–1961-1969 (Vice Principal - East High School, retired)
- Alonzo W. Thompson–1969-1975 (Principal - Clinton Junior High School, named Director of Buffalo Public Schools' Office of Affirmative Action)
- William D. Bennett–1975-1977 (Director of Student Activities - East High School, named Principal of Buffalo Vocational Technical Center)
- Geraldine Horton–2005-2011 (Principal - Buffalo Traditional School, named Supervising Principal of Buffalo Public Schools)
- Casey M. Young-Welch–2011-2015 (Principal - Academy School @ 44, Middle Early College)
- Janice M. Bowden [interim]–2015-2016 (Assistant Principal - East High School, named Assistant Principal of Academy School @ 4)
- Rose M. Schneider–2016-2018 (Instructional Specialist - East High School, named Principal of North Park Middle Academy)

== Notable alumni ==
- Juini Booth - Jazz bassist
- Al Cervi - Former NBA player/coach
- Matt Urban - Medal of Honor recipient, World War II
- Grover Washington, Jr. - American jazz saxophonist
