= Bennett High School (Buffalo, New York) =

American high school in Buffalo, New York

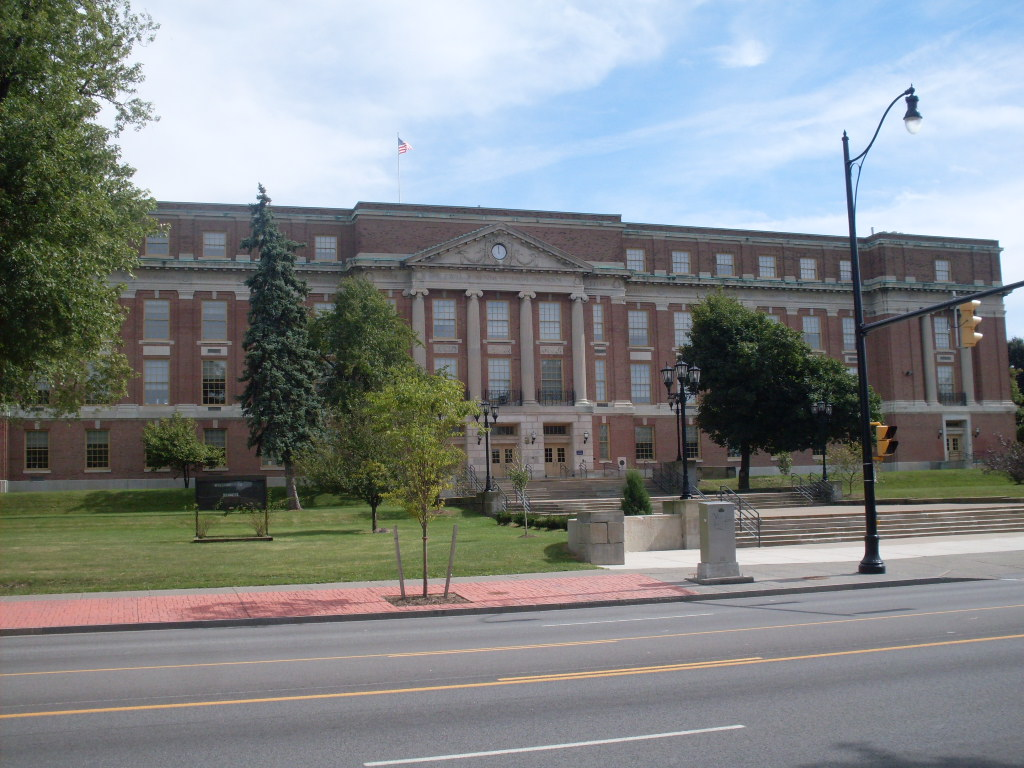

Location
- 2885 Main Street; Buffalo, New York 14214; United States; 42°56′38″N 78°49′56″W

Information
- Funding type: Public
- Motto: Optima Futura (The Best is Yet to Be)
- Opened: September 8, 1925
- Status: Now called Lewis J. Bennett High School of Innovated Technology
- School district: Buffalo Public Schools
- School number: 200
- Grades: 9–12
- Colors: Blue and orange
- Team name: Tigers
- Yearbook: Beacon
- Website: buffaloschools.org/Bennett.cfm

Bennett High School was an American high school located in the University Heights section of Buffalo, New York. It was named after Lewis J. Bennett, who donated the land for the school and for All High Stadium. Bennett High School formerly was a magnet school with three college prep programs: the Academy of International Law (similar to pre-law), Business and Computers (similar to information systems), and Education and the Arts.

== History ==
Bennett High School was built in 1923 (cornerstone laid on November 15, 1923), opened on September 8, 1925 and was dedicated on November 24, 1925. It has four stories with 270,000 square feet (25,000 m^{2}). It is named after Lewis J. Bennett, who donated the land for the school and for All High Stadium. Portions of the 1984 movie The Natural were filmed in All High Stadium, although it was filmed as Wrigley Field.

The school was renovated in the summer of 2005 and the summer of 2006. During this time, some students were housed at Bennett while others were housed at nearby School 63 on Minnesota Avenue.

In 2014, the alumni association and the Buffalo Board of Education worked cooperatively to bring a dramatic change to the curriculum at Bennett. In 2017, the last class of students in the original Bennett programs graduated. At the same time a new program was put into place, the Lewis J. Bennett High School of Innovative Technology. Its first graduating class was in 2020.

== Notable alumni ==
- Curtis Aiken, radio analyst and former basketball player
- Michael Bennett (1943 – 1987), who wrote the Broadway musical A Chorus Line dropped his last name, DiFiglia, when he went to Broadway.
- Bruce Beyer (1948 – 2019) anti-Vietnam War activist
- Lawrence Block (b. 1938), writer
- Sorrell Booke (1930 – 1994), who played Boss Hogg in the Dukes of Hazzard TV show was a 1948 Bennett grad.
- John Elliot (1914 – 1972), songwriter
- Leslie Feinberg (1949 – 2014), author and activist
- Don Gilbert (b. 1943), CFL player
- Sanford Greenberg (b. 1940), American investor, philanthropist
- Reed Hadley (1911 – 1974), actor
- Karla F.C. Holloway (b. 1949), James B. Duke Professor of English, Professor of Law, Duke University. Dean, Humanities & Social Sciences. Was Karla Clapp at Bennett, led debate team to statewide championship.
- Catherine Ryan Hyde (b. 1955), novelist, author of Pay It Forward
- Rick James (1948 – 2004), funk superstar, played in the Bennett High School Band.
- Beverly Johnson (b. 1952), fashion model, was a graduate of Bennett High School. She was the first Black cover model for Vogue.
- John H. Kennell (1922 – 2013), doctor of pediatrics and researcher
- Bob Lanier (1948 – 2022), Basketball Hall of Famer, graduated from Bennett in 1966
- David Lucas (b. 1937), music producer and jingle writer, attended Bennett in the 1950s but then transferred to a school in Florida.
- Isaiah McDuffie (b. 1999), NFL player
- Dick Offenhamer (1913 – 1998), former University at Buffalo football coach
- Robert E. Rich, Sr. (1913 – 2006), founder of Rich Products Corporation, was the starting center for the Bennett High School football team which lost the 1930 Harvard Cup to South Park 13–2.
- Antoine Thompson (b. 1970), former New York State Senator
- Westside Gunn (b. 1982), Rapper

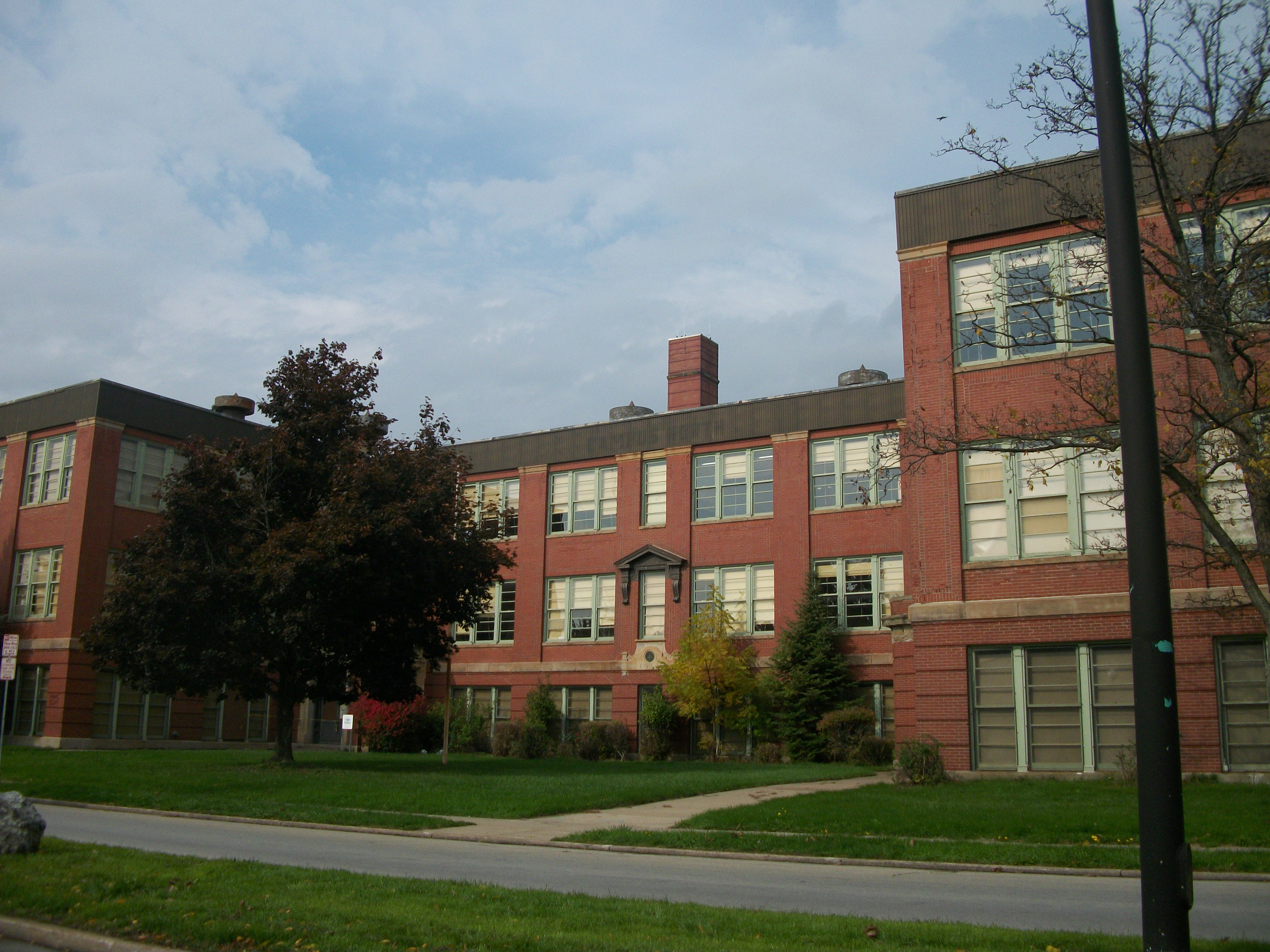
School 63, where selected Bennett students were housed while Bennett was renovated.
