= List of closed secondary schools in New York =

This is a list of closed secondary schools in New York. Also see Category:Defunct schools in New York (state).

School	Location	Date of closure	Currently at this location
Academy at Ivy Ridge	Ogdensburg	2009	abandoned
Academy of Our Lady of Good Counsel	White Plains	2017	
Academy of Saint Joseph	Brentwood	2009	
Jane Addams High School for Academic Careers	The Bronx	2012	
Alexander Classical School	Alexander	1937	Historic building
All Hallows High School	South Bronx	2025	
Aquinas High School	Belmont, Bronx	2021	Cardinal McCloskey Community Charter Elementary School
Augustinian Academy	Staten Island	1969	demolished in 2006
Bay Ridge High School	Bay Ridge, Brooklyn	1985	High School of Telecommunication Arts and Technology
Beach Channel High School	Rockaway Park, Queens	2014	Beach Channel Educational Campus (3 schools)
Bennett High School	Buffalo	2017	Lewis J. Bennett School of Innovative Technology
Bishop Dubois High School	Hamilton Heights, Manhattan	1976	
Bishop Kearney High School	Bensonhurst, Brooklyn	2019	
Blessed Sacrament-St. Gabriel High School	New Rochelle	2013	
Boys High School	Bedford–Stuyvesant, Brooklyn	1975	merged with Girls' High School to become Boys and Girls High School
Brookholt School of Agriculture for Women	East Meadow	1912	demolished; now Mitchel Manor housing development
Brooklyn Heights Seminary	Brooklyn	1933	demolished
Brooklyn Preparatory School	Crown Heights, Brooklyn	1972	
Buffalo Traditional School	Buffalo	2005	Buffalo Academy for Visual and Performing Arts
Canarsie High School	Canarsie, Brooklyn	2011	Canarsie Educational Campus
Cardinal Mooney High School	Greece	1989	became Apollo Middle School, then Odyssey Academy in 2012
Cathedral High School	Manhattan	2026	
Central Technical High School	Syracuse	1975	Syracuse STEAM High School
Chappaqua Mountain Institute	Chappaqua	1908	bought by Elizabeth Milbank Anderson in 1909; closed in 1967 and eventually demolished
Charlotte High School	Rochester	2016	
Evander Childs High School	The Bronx	2008	Evander Childs Educational Campus
Claverack College	Claverack	1902	demolished; partial remnants built into George Felpel House
Grover Cleveland High School	Buffalo	2011	The International Preparatory School
Clinton Liberal Institute	Clinton	1900	destroyed in a fire; merged into St. Lawrence University
Coindre Hall	Huntington	1971	Eagle Hill School (1981-89); currently administered by Suffolk County Parks and Recreation
John A. Coleman Catholic High School	Hurley	2019	
De La Salle Institute	Manhattan		
Delaware Literary Institute	Franklin	1902	partially demolished; Franklin Stage Company
DeSales High School	Geneva	2012	
Dominican Commercial High School	Jamaica, Queens	1998	Wellington Hall
Dr. Holbrook's Military School	Briarcliff Manor	1915	Teachers College Country Club (1919-1927)
East High School	Buffalo	2018	East Community High School
East Side Hebrew Institute	East Village, Manhattan	c. 1980s	merged into Park East Synagogue to become Park East Day School
Far Rockaway High School	Far Rockaway, Queens	2011	
Eastern District High School	Williamsburg, Brooklyn	1996	Grand Street Campus
Eastern Military Academy	Cold Spring Harbor	1979	
Emerson Vocational High School	Buffalo	2002	Harvey Austin School
Erasmus Hall High School	Flatbush, Brooklyn	1994	Erasmus Hall Educational Campus
Etz Chaim Yeshiva	Lower East Side, Manhattan		Yeshiva University
Franciscan High School	Mohegan Lake	1991	
Benjamin Franklin High School (Manhattan)	East Harlem	1982	Manhattan Center for Science and Mathematics
Benjamin Franklin High School (Rochester)	Rochester	unknown	Renamed several times; currently Padilla High School at Franklin Campus.
Girls' High School	Bedford–Stuyvesant, Brooklyn	1975	merged with Boys High School to become Boys and Girls High School
Samuel Gompers High School	East Morrisania, Bronx	2012	
Haaren High School	Midtown Manhattan	c. 1970s	Haaren Hall, multi-use building in John Jay College
Alexander Hamilton High School	Crown Heights, Brooklyn	1984	Paul Robeson High School for Business and Technology (1984-2011), Pathways to Technology High School
High School of Music & Art	Hamilton Heights, Manhattan	1984	merged into LaGuardia High School
High School of Performing Arts	Manhattan	1984	merged into LaGuardia High School
Holy Angels Academy	Buffalo	2013	Charter School for Applied Technologies Middle School
Holy Family Diocesan High School	South Huntington	1984	St. Anthony's High School
Immaculata Academy	Hamburg	2016	luxury apartment complex
Washington Irving High School	Tarrytown	1979	Landmark Condominiums
Andrew Jackson High School	Cambria Heights, Queens	1994	Campus Magnet Building
Jamaica High School	Jamaica, Queens	2014	Jamaica Educational Campus
John Jay High School	Park Slope, Brooklyn	2004	John Jay Educational Campus
Thomas Jefferson High School (Brooklyn)	East New York, Brooklyn	2007	Thomas Jefferson Educational Campus
Thomas Jefferson High School (Rochester)	Rochester	2012	Rochester International Academy
Kensington High School	Buffalo	2003	Frederick Law Olmsted School at Kensington
Kibler High School	Tonawanda	1983	Senior housing
Martin Luther King Jr. High School	Lincoln Square, Manhattan	2005	Martin Luther King Jr. Educational Campus
Lafayette High School	Buffalo	2018	Lafayette International High School
Franklin K. Lane High School	Brooklyn	2012	H.S. 420 Educational Campus
La Salle Military Academy	Oakdale	2001	purchased by Amity University
Manhattan Vocational and Technical High School	Manhattan	1968	
John Marshall High School	Rochester	2014	All City High
Maslow-Toffler School of Futuristic Education	Brentwood	1983	
Catherine McAuley High School	East Flatbush, Brooklyn	2013	Cristo Rey Brooklyn High School
McBurney School	Manhattan	1988	
Milne School	Albany	1977	Rockefeller College of Public Affairs and Policy
James Monroe High School	Soundview, Bronx	1997	Monroe High School Educational Campus (7 schools)
Morris High School	Melrose, Bronx	2002	Morris Campus
Mother Cabrini High School	Hudson Heights, Manhattan	2014	Success Academy Charter Schools
Mount Saint Joseph Academy	Buffalo	2010	
New Lincoln School	Manhattan	1988	Birch Wathen Lenox School
New York High School	Manhattan	1831	
Norman Thomas High School	Murray Hill, Manhattan	2014	
Academy of Our Lady of Lourdes	Greenwich Village, Manhattan	1943	Notre Dame School (Manhattan)
Our Lady of Mercy Academy	Syosset	2024	
Our Lady of Victory Academy	Dobbs Ferry	2011	Mercy University
Patchogue High School	East Patchogue	1972	Saxton Avenue Middle School
Peekskill Military Academy	Peekskill	1968	mostly demolished to create Peekskill High School; Ford Administration Building remains
Power Memorial Academy	Manhattan	1984	demolished
Prospect Heights High School	Prospect Heights, Brooklyn	2006	Prospect Heights Educational Campus (4 schools)
Rhodes Preparatory School	Manhattan	1988	
Rice High School	Harlem, Manhattan	2011	
Riverside Institute of Technology	Buffalo	2019	Riverside Academy High School
Rockland Country Day School	Congers	2019	
Theodore Roosevelt High School	Belmont, Bronx	2006	Theodore Roosevelt Educational Campus
St. Agnes Academic High School	College Point, Queens	2021	
St. Agnes Boys High School	Upper West Side, Manhattan	2013	Converted into luxury housing
Saint Barnabas High School	Woodlawn Heights, Bronx	2024	
St. Helena's Schools	Throggs Neck, Bronx	1976	Monsignor Scanlan High School
St. John Villa Academy	Arrochar, Staten Island	2018	
St. Joseph High School	Brooklyn	2020	
St. Mary's High School	Somers	1966	John F. Kennedy Catholic Preparatory School
St. Michael Academy	West Midtown, Manhattan	2010	
St. Nicholas of Tolentine High School	University Heights, Bronx	1991	
St. Peter's Girls High School	Saint George, Staten Island	2011	The Harborview School
St. Pius V High School	Mott Haven, Bronx	2011	
Sands Point Country Day School	Sands Point	1974	
Scarborough Day School	Briarcliff Manor	1978	Clear View School Day Treatment Center
School 13	Buffalo	2003	Historic building
School 87	Buffalo	2014	Buffalo Public Schools' Department of Curriculum, Instruction, and Assessment
Seneca Vocational High School	Buffalo	2006	Math, Science, Technology Preparatory School
Seton Hall High School	Patchogue	1974	St. Joseph's University, New York
Seward Park High School	Manhattan	2006	Seward Park Campus
Sherburne High School	Sherburne	1981	Historic building
Solomon Schechter High School of New York	Manhattan	2006	merged with Schechter Regional High School to form Metro Schechter Academy in Teaneck, NJ; closed 2007
South Shore High School	Canarsie, Brooklyn	2014	South Shore Educational Complex (7 schools)
Springfield Gardens High School	Springfield Gardens, Queens	2007	Springfield Gardens Educational Campus
Stella Maris High School	Rockaway Park, Queens	2010	
William Howard Taft High School	Morrisania, Bronx	2008	William H. Taft Educational Campus (8 schools)
Samuel J. Tilden High School	East Flatbush, Brooklyn	2010	Tilden Educational Complex
Townsend Harris Hall Prep School	Manhattan	1930	Townsend Harris High School
Utica Free Academy	Utica	1990	merged into Thomas R. Proctor High School
Veltin School for Girls	Manhattan	1924	Calhoun School Beir Lower School
Villa Maria Academy	Buffalo	2006	Villa Maria Motherhouse Complex
Wadleigh High School for Girls	Manhattan	c. 2000s	Three separate schools
Walton High School	Jerome Park, Bronx	2008	Walton Campus (5 schools)
George W. Wingate High School	Wingate, Brooklyn	2006	George W. Wingate Educational Complex (4 schools)
