= 1992 Green Bay Packers season =

NFL team season

- General manager: Ron Wolf
- President: Bob Harlan
- Head coach: Mike Holmgren
- Offensive coordinator: Sherman Lewis
- Defensive coordinator: Ray Rhodes
- Home stadium: Lambeau Field; Milwaukee County Stadium

Results
- Record: 9–7
- Division place: 2nd NFC Central
- Playoffs: Did not qualify
- Pro Bowlers: QB Brett Favre; WR Sterling Sharpe; FS Chuck Cecil

The 1992 season was the Green Bay Packers' 72nd season in the National Football League (NFL), their 74th overall. The team finished with a 9–7 record under new coach Mike Holmgren, earning them a second-place finish in the NFC Central division. 1992 would be a turning point for the Packers, as the team saw the emergence of QB Brett Favre and the start of the Packers' success of the 1990s.

== Offseason ==
On December 22, 1991, the Packers fired Lindy Infante after four seasons. On January 11, 1992, the Packers hired Mike Holmgren as their new head coach. Holmgren came from the San Francisco 49ers, where he served as quarterbacks coach under Bill Walsh and offensive coordinator under George Seifert.

Additions	Subtractions
QB Brett Favre (Falcons)	C Blair Bush (Rams)
OT Joe Sims (Falcons)	QB Blair Kiel (Falcons)
C Frank Winters (Chiefs)	QB Mike Tomczak (Browns)
FB Buford McGee (Rams)	S Mark Murphy (retirement)
OT Harvey Salem (Broncos)	LB Scott Stephen (Rams)
S Adrian White (Giants)	WR Charles Wilson (Buccaneers)
OT Tootie Robbins (Cardinals)	RB Keith Woodside (Cowboys)
WR Sanjay Beach (49ers)	RB Vai Sikahema (Eagles)
RB Marcus Wilson (Raiders)	WR Erik Affholter (Chargers)
RB Harry Sydney (49ers)	WR Jeff Query (Bengals)
RB Greg Bell (Raiders)	LB Reggie Burnette (Buccaneers)
CB Lewis Billups (Bengals)	
WR Kitrick Taylor (Chargers)	
DE Andre Townsend (Broncos)	
C David Viaene (Patriots)	
LB Jeff Brady (Steelers)	

=== NFL draft ===
1992 Green Bay Packers draft
Round	Pick	Player	Position	College	Notes
1	5	Terrell Buckley	Cornerback	Florida State	
2	34	Mark D'Onofrio	Linebacker	Penn State	
3	62	Robert Brooks	Wide receiver	South Carolina	
4	103	Edgar Bennett	Running back	Florida State	
5	119	Dexter McNabb	Fullback	Florida	
5	130	Orlando McKay	Wide receiver	Washington	
6	157	Mark Chmura *	Tight end	Boston College	
7	190	Chris Holder	Wide receiver	Tuskegee	
9	230	Ty Detmer	Quarterback	BYU	
9	240	Shazzon Bradley	Defensive tackle	Tennessee	
10	257	Andrew Oberg	Offensive tackle	North Carolina	
11	287	Gabe Mokuwah	Linebacker	American	
12	314	Brett Collins	Linebacker	Washington	
Made roster * Made at least one Pro Bowl during career

=== Undrafted free agents ===
1992 undrafted free agents of note
Player	Position	College
Sebastian Barrie	Defensive End	Liberty
Anthony Booker	Offensive Tackle	Indiana State
Jon Lauscher	Linebacker	UW–La Crosse

== Staff ==
1992 Green Bay Packers staff
Front office: President/Chief Executive Officer – Bob Harlan; Executive Vice President/General Manager – Ron Wolf; Director of Pro Personnel – Jesse Kaye; Director of College Scouting – John Math; Assistant Director of Pro Personnel – Ted Thompson; Head coaches: Head Coach – Mike Holmgren; Offensive coaches: Offensive Coordinator – Sherman Lewis; Quarterbacks – Steve Mariucci; Running Backs – Gil Haskell; Offensive Line – Tom Lovat; Assistant Offensive Line/Tight Ends – Andy Reid; Offensive Assistant/Quality Control – Jon Gruden	Defensive coaches: Defensive Coordinator – Ray Rhodes; Defensive Line – Greg Blache; Linebackers – Bob Valesente; Defensive Backs/Secondary – Dick Jauron; Defensive Assistant/Quality Control – Jim Lind; Special teams coaches: Special Teams – Nolan Cromwell; Strength and conditioning: Strength and Conditioning – Kent Johnston

== Roster ==
1992 Green Bay Packers roster
Quarterbacks (QB): 11 Ty Detmer; 4 Brett Favre; 7 Don Majkowski; Running backs (RB): 34 Edgar Bennett; 45 Dexter McNabb FB; 42 Harry Sydney FB; 39 Darrell Thompson; 29 Marcus Wilson; Wide receivers (WR): 82 Sanjay Beach; 87 Robert Brooks; 81 Corey Harris; 85 Ron Lewis; 84 Sterling Sharpe; Tight ends (TE): 80 Jackie Harris; 88 Darryl Ingram; 86 Ed West	Offensive linemen (OL): 63 James Campen C; 71 Cecil Gray LT; 65 Ron Hallstrom G; 61 Tom Neville G; 73 Tootie Robbins RT; 75 Ken Ruettgers LT; 68 Joe Sims RT; 52 Frank Winters G; Defensive linemen (DL): 74 Lester Archambeau DE; 94 Matt Brock DE; 93 Robert Brown DE; 99 Don Davey DE; 92 John Jurkovic NT; 98 Alfred Oglesby NT	Linebackers (LB): 90 Tony Bennett OLB; 51 Jeff Brady ILB; 55 Brett Collins ILB; 56 Burnell Dent OLB; 53 George Koonce ILB; 91 Brian Noble ILB; 95 Bryce Paup OLB; Defensive backs (DB): 27 Terrell Buckley CB; 36 LeRoy Butler SS; 21 Carl Carter CB; 26 Chuck Cecil FS; 25 Vinnie Clark CB; 24 Tim Hauck FS; 47 Roland Mitchell CB; 38 Adrian White SS; Special teams (ST): 13 Chris Jacke K; 9 Bryan Wagner P	Practice squad: 60 Terry Beauford G; 69 Martin Hochertz DE; 20 Chris Holder WR; Reserve: 67 Sebastian Barrie DE (IR); 89 Mark Chmura TE (IR); 90 Mark D'Onofrio OLB (IR); 58 Joe Garten G (IR); 43 Charles Henry TE (IR); 50 Johnny Holland ILB (IR); 77 Tony Mandarich RT (NF-Ill.); 23 Dave McCloughan CB (IR); 83 Orlando McKay WR (IR); 57 Rich Moran G (IR); 96 Shawn Patterson DE (IR); 72 Harvey Salem RT (IR); 46 Vince Workman RB (IR); 47 active, 13 inactive, 3 practice squad Rookies in italics

== Regular season ==
=== Schedule ===
Week	Date	Opponent	Result	Record	Venue	Attendance
1	September 6	**Minnesota Vikings**	**L** 20–23 (OT)	0–1	Lambeau Field	58,617
2	September 13	at **Tampa Bay Buccaneers**	**L** 3–31	0–2	Tampa Stadium	50,051
3	September 20	Cincinnati Bengals	**W** 24–23	1–2	Lambeau Field	57,272
4	September 27	Pittsburgh Steelers	**W** 17–3	2–2	Lambeau Field	58,724
5	October 4	at Atlanta Falcons	**L** 10–24	2–3	Georgia Dome	63,769
6	Bye					
7	October 18	at Cleveland Browns	**L** 6–17	2–4	Cleveland Stadium	69,268
8	October 25	**Chicago Bears**	**L** 10–30	2–5	Lambeau Field	59,435
9	November 1	at **Detroit Lions**	**W** 27–13	3–5	Pontiac Silverdome	60,594
10	November 8	at New York Giants	**L** 7–27	3–6	Giants Stadium	72,038
11	November 15	Philadelphia Eagles	**W** 27–24	4–6	Milwaukee County Stadium	52,689
12	November 22	at **Chicago Bears**	**W** 17–3	5–6	Soldier Field	56,170
13	November 29	**Tampa Bay Buccaneers**	**W** 19–14	6–6	Milwaukee County Stadium	52,347
14	December 6	**Detroit Lions**	**W** 38–10	7–6	Milwaukee County Stadium	49,469
15	December 13	at Houston Oilers	**W** 16–14	8–6	Astrodome	57,285
16	December 20	Los Angeles Rams	**W** 28–13	9–6	Lambeau Field	57,796
17	December 27	at **Minnesota Vikings**	**L** 7–27	9–7	Hubert H. Humphrey Metrodome	61,461

Note: Intra-division opponents are in bold text.

=== Season summary ===
==== Brett Favre ====
In the second game of the 1992 season, the Packers played the Tampa Bay Buccaneers. The Buccaneers were leading 17–0 at half time when head coach Mike Holmgren benched starting quarterback Don Majkowski and Favre played the second half. On his first regular season play as a Packer, Favre threw a pass which was deflected and caught by himself. Favre was tackled and the completion went for −7 yards. The Packers lost the game 31–3, chalking up only 106 yards passing.

In the third game of the 1992 season, then-starting quarterback Don Majkowski injured a ligament in his ankle against the Cincinnati Bengals, an injury severe enough that he would be out for four weeks. Favre replaced Majkowski for the remainder of the contest. Favre fumbled four times during the course of the game, a performance poor enough that the crowd chanted for Favre to be removed in favor of another Packers backup quarterback at the time, Ty Detmer. However, down 23–17 with 1:07 left in the game, the Packers started an offensive series on their own 8 yard line. Still at the quarterback position, Favre completed a 42-yard pass to Sterling Sharpe. Two plays later, Favre threw the game-winning touchdown pass to Kitrick Taylor with 13 seconds remaining.

The next week's game against the Pittsburgh Steelers began the longest consecutive starts streak for a quarterback in NFL history. The game ended in a 17–3 victory and his passer rating was 144.6. During the season, Favre helped put together a six-game winning streak for the Packers, the longest winning streak for the club since 1965. They ended 9–7 that season, missing the playoffs on their last game. Favre finished his first season as a Packer with 3,227 yards and a quarterback rating of 85.3, helping him to his first Pro Bowl.

==== Week 1: vs. Minnesota Vikings ====
Week One: Minnesota Vikings at Green Bay Packers

Quarter	1	2	3	4	OT	Total
**Vikings**	0	10	3	7	3	**23**
Packers	7	3	0	10	0	**20**

at Lambeau Field, Green Bay, Wisconsin

- Date: September 6, 1992
- Game time: 12:00 p.m. CST
- Game weather: 68 °F (20 °C), wind 9 mph (14 km/h)
- TV announcers (CBS): Mike Emrick and Matt Millen

Game information

**First quarter**

**Second quarter**

**Third quarter**

**Fourth quarter**

Top passers

- MIN – Rich Gannon – 21/44, 266 yards, 2 TD, INT
- GB – Don Majkowski – 27/38, 189 yards, 2 TD, INT

Top rushers

- MIN – Terry Allen – 12 rushes, 140 yards
- GB – Vince Workman – 25 rushes, 89 yards

Top receivers

- MIN – Steve Jordan – 4 receptions, 77 yards
- GB – Sterling Sharpe – 8 receptions, 99 yards, TD

==== Week 2: at Tampa Bay Buccaneers ====
Week Two: Green Bay Packers at Tampa Bay Buccaneers

Quarter	1	2	3	4	Total
Packers	0	0	3	0	**3**
**Buccaneers**	14	3	7	7	**31**

at Tampa Stadium, Tampa, Florida

- Date: September 13, 1992
- Game time: 12:00 p.m. CST
- Game weather: 80 °F (27 °C), wind 10 mph (16 km/h)
- TV announcers (CBS): Mike Emrick and Matt Millen

Game information

**First quarter**

**Second quarter**

**Third quarter**

**Fourth quarter**

Top passers

- GB – Don Majkowski – 10/15, 75 yards, 1 INT
- TAM – Vinny Testaverde – 22/25, 363 yards, 2 TD

Top rushers

- GB – Vince Workman – 7 rushes, 36 yards
- TAM – Reggie Cobb – 10 rushes, 30 yards

Top receivers

- GB – Sterling Sharpe – 8 receptions, 62 yards
- TAM – Mark Carrier – 7 receptions, 115 yards, TD

==== Week 3: vs. Cincinnati Bengals ====
Week Three: Cincinnati Bengals at Green Bay Packers

Quarter	1	2	3	4	Total
Bengals	0	10	7	6	**23**
**Packers**	0	3	0	21	**24**

at Lambeau Field, Green Bay, Wisconsin

- Date: September 20
- Game time: 12:00 p.m. CST
- Game weather: Clear, 56 °F (13 °C)
- Game attendance: 57,272
- Referee: Dick Hantak
- TV announcers (NBC): Jim Lampley and Ahmad Rashad
- Box Score, Box Score

Game information

First quarter

- No scoring

Second quarter

- CIN – Jim Breech 20-yard field goal, 9:44. Bengals 3–0.
- CIN – Carl Pickens 95-yard punt return (Jim Breech kick), 6:55. Bengals 10–0.
- GB – Chris Jacke 37-yard field goal, 0:36. Bengals 10–3.

Third quarter

- CIN – Eric Ball 17-yard pass from Boomer Esiason (Jim Breech kick), 2:21. Bengals 17–3.

Fourth quarter

- GB – Terrell Buckley 58-yard punt return (Chris Jacke kick), 12:43. Bengals 17–10.
- GB – Sterling Sharpe 5-yard pass from Brett Favre (Chris Jacke kick), 10:49. Tie 17–17.
- CIN – Jim Breech 34-yard field goal, 8:05. Bengals 20–17.
- CIN – Jim Breech 41-yard field goal, 2:07. Bengals 23–17.
- GB – Kitrick Taylor 35-yard pass from Brett Favre (Chris Jacke kick), 0:13. Packers 24–23.

Top passers

- CIN – Boomer Esiason – 11/23, 128 yards, TD, 2 INT
- GB – Brett Favre – 22/39, 289 yards, 2 TD

Top rushers

- CIN – Harold Green – 21 rushes, 101 yards
- GB – Vince Workman – 14 rushes, 50 yards

Top receivers

- CIN – Tim McGee – 3 receptions, 43 yards
- GB – Sterling Sharpe – 7 receptions, 109 yards, TD

==== Week 4: vs. Pittsburgh Steelers ====
Week Four: Pittsburgh Steelers at Green Bay Packers

Quarter	1	2	3	4	Total
Steelers	3	0	0	0	**3**
**Packers**	0	10	0	7	**17**

at Lambeau Field, Green Bay, Wisconsin

- Date: September 27, 1992
- Game time: 12:00 p.m. CST
- Game weather: 57 °F (14 °C), wind 12 mph (19 km/h)
- TV announcers (NBC): Charlie Jones and Todd Christensen

Game information

**First quarter**

**Second quarter**

**Third quarter**

**Fourth quarter**

Top passers

- PIT – Neil O'Donnell – 16/41, 224 yards
- GB – Brett Favre – 14/16, 210 yards, 2 TD

Top rushers

- PIT – Barry Foster – 12 rushes, 117 yards
- GB – Vince Workman – 26 rushes, 85 yards

Top receivers

- PIT – Dwight Stone – 5 receptions, 101 yards
- GB – Sterling Sharpe – 2 receptions, 93 yards, TD

==== Week 5: at Atlanta Falcons ====
Team	1	2	3	4	Total
Packers	0	0	7	3	10
• Falcons	14	0	3	7	24

- Date: October 4
- Location: Georgia Dome
- Referee: Gordon McCarter

==== Week 7: at Cleveland Browns ====
Week Seven: Green Bay Packers at Cleveland Browns

Quarter	1	2	3	4	Total
Packers	0	0	3	3	**6**
**Browns**	3	0	7	7	**17**

at Cleveland Stadium, Cleveland, Ohio

- Date: October 18, 1992
- Game time: 12:00 p.m. CST/1:00 p.m. EST
- Game weather: 38 °F (3 °C), wind 11 mph (18 km/h)
- TV announcers (CBS): Jim Nantz and Hank Stram

Game information

**First quarter**

**Second quarter**

**Third quarter**

**Fourth quarter**

Top passers

- GB – Brett Favre – 20/33, 223 yards
- CLE – Mike Tomczak – 13/21, 158 yards

Top rushers

- GB – Vince Workman – 10 rushes, 30 yards
- CLE – Kevin Mack – 19 rushes, 75 yards, 2 TD

Top receivers

- GB – Vince Workman – 8 receptions, 84 yards
- CLE – Michael Jackson – 4 receptions, 43 yards

==== Week 8: vs. Chicago Bears ====
Team	1	2	3	4	Total
• Bears	3	17	3	7	30
Packers	0	10	0	0	10

- Date: October 25
- Location: Lambeau Field
- Referee: Red Cashion

==== Week 9: at Detroit Lions ====
Week Nine: Green Bay Packers at Detroit Lions

Quarter	1	2	3	4	Total
**Packers**	7	10	3	7	**27**
Lions	3	0	10	0	**13**

at Pontiac Silverdome, Pontiac, Michigan

- Date: November 1, 1992
- Game time: 12:00 p.m. CST/1:00 p.m. EST
- Game weather: None (played indoors)
- Game attendance: 60,594
- TV announcers (CBS): Tim Ryan and Matt Millen

Game information

**First quarter**

**Second quarter**

**Third quarter**

**Fourth quarter**

Top passers

- GB – Brett Favre – 22/37, 212 yards, 2 TD
- DET – Rodney Peete – 14/28, 148 yards

Top rushers

- GB – Vince Workman – 23 rushes, 101 yards
- DET – Barry Sanders – 12 rushes, 38 yards

Top receivers

- GB – Sterling Sharpe – 6 receptions, 84 yards, TD
- DET – Brett Perriman – 5 receptions, 67 yards

==== Week 10: at New York Giants ====
Team	1	2	3	4	Total
Packers	0	7	0	0	7
• Giants	6	7	0	14	27

- Date: November 8
- Location: Giants Stadium
- Referee: Larry Nemmers
- TV announcers (CBS): Dick Stockton and Randy Cross

==== Week 11: vs. Philadelphia Eagles ====
Team	1	2	3	4	Total
Eagles	3	0	7	14	24
• Packers	0	14	0	13	27

- Date: November 15
- Location: Milwaukee County Stadium
- Referee: Gerald Austin
- TV announcers (CBS): James Brown and George Starke

==== Week 12: at Chicago Bears ====
Team	1	2	3	4	Total
• Packers	10	0	0	7	17
Bears	3	0	0	0	3

- Date: November 22
- Location: Soldier Field
- Game start: 12:00 p.m. CST
- Game attendance: 56,170
- Referee: Tom White
- TV announcers (CBS): Verne Lundquist and Dan Fouts

Scoring summary
Q1	CHI	Butler 36 yard field goal	CHI 3–0
Q1	GB	Jacke 39 yard field goal	Tie 3–3
Q1	GB	Sharpe 49 yard pass from Favre (Jacke kick)	GB 10–3
Q4	GB	Favre 5 yard run (Jacke kick)	GB 17–3

==== Week 13: vs. Tampa Bay Buccaneers ====
Team	1	2	3	4	Total
Buccaneers	7	0	7	0	14
• Packers	3	6	3	7	19

- Date: November 29
- Location: Milwaukee County Stadium
- Referee: Bernie Kukar

==== Week 14: vs. Detroit Lions ====
Team	1	2	3	4	Total
Lions	0	10	0	0	10
• Packers	14	21	0	3	38

- Date: December 6
- Location: Milwaukee County Stadium
- Referee: Bob McElwee
- TV announcers (CBS): Tim Ryan and Matt Millen

==== Week 15: at Houston Oilers ====
Week 15: Green Bay Packers at Houston Oilers

Quarter	1	2	3	4	Total
**Packers**	0	3	6	7	**16**
Oilers	0	0	7	7	**14**

at Astrodome, Houston, Texas

- Date: December 13, 1992
- Game time: 7:00 p.m. CST
- Game weather: None (played indoors)
- Game attendance: 57,285
- TV announcers (ESPN): Mike Patrick and Joe Theismann

Game information

**First quarter**

**Second quarter**

**Third quarter**

**Fourth quarter**

Top passers

- GB – Brett Favre – 19/30, 155 yards, TD, INT
- HOU – Cody Carlson – 25/36, 330 yards, 2 INT

Top rushers

- GB – Darrell Thompson – 15 rushes, 30 yards
- HOU – Lorenzo White – 15 rushes, 54 yards

Top receivers

- GB – Sterling Sharpe – 6 receptions, 46 yards, TD
- HOU – Curtis Duncan – 6 receptions, 100 yards

==== Week 16: vs. Los Angeles Rams ====
Team	1	2	3	4	Total
Rams	7	3	3	0	13
• Packers	0	28	0	0	28

- Date: December 20
- Location: Lambeau Field
- Referee: Gordon McCarter

==== Week 17: at Minnesota Vikings ====
Week 17: Green Bay Packers at Minnesota Viking

Quarter	1	2	3	4	Total
Packers	7	0	0	0	**7**
**Vikings**	7	13	7	0	**27**

at Hubert H. Humphrey Metrodome, Minneapolis, Minnesota

- Date: December 27, 1992
- Game time: 12:00 p.m. CST
- Game weather: None (played indoors)
- Game attendance: 61,461
- TV announcers (CBS): Verne Lundquist and Dan Fouts

Game information

**First quarter**

**Second quarter**

**Third quarter**

**Fourth quarter**

Top passers

- GB – Brett Favre – 23/35, 187 yards, 3 INT
- MIN – Sean Salisbury – 20/33, 292 yards, 2 TD

Top rushers

- GB – Edgar Bennett – 2 rushes, 18 yards
- MIN – Terry Allen – 10 rushes, 100 yards, TD

Top receivers

- GB – Sterling Sharpe – 6 receptions, 45 yards
- MIN – Steve Jordan – 6 receptions, 69 yards, TD

=== Standings ===
NFC Central
	W	L	T	PCT	DIV	CONF	PF	PA	STK
^{(3)} Minnesota Vikings	11	5	0	.688	7–1	8–4	374	249	W2
Green Bay Packers	9	7	0	.563	4–4	6–6	276	296	L1
Tampa Bay Buccaneers	5	11	0	.313	3–5	5–9	267	365	W1
Chicago Bears	5	11	0	.313	3–5	4–8	295	361	L2
Detroit Lions	5	11	0	.313	3–5	3–9	273	332	L1

== Awards and records ==
- Brett Favre, NFC Pro Bowl
- Brett Favre, NFC Leader, Completions (tied): 302
