= JMac =

JMac may refer to:

- Jamie Maclaren (born 1993), Australian soccer player
- Ja'Mori Maclin, American football wide receiver
- Jeremy Maclin (born 1988), American football wide receiver
- Jesse McCartney (born 1987), American actor and singer-songwriter
- Jason McElwain (born 1988), American amateur athlete and public speaker
