= Bello Snyder =

American basketball player

Personal information
- Born: February 7, 1912 Rochester, New York, U.S.
- Died: May 19, 1998 (aged 86) Rochester, New York, U.S.
- Listed height: 5 ft 9 in (1.75 m)
- Listed weight: 185 lb (84 kg)

Career information
- High school: Franklin (Rochester, New York)
- Playing career: 1933–1945
- Position: Forward

Career history
- 1933–1934: Rochester Centrals
- 1934–1935: Rochester
- 1934–1935: Buffalo
- 1935–1936: Buffalo Bisons
- 1936–1938: Newark Elks
- 1937–1938: Buffalo Bisons
- 1938–1942: Rochester Seagrams
- 1939–1940: Syracuse
- 1944–1945: Rochester Guards

Joseph Samuel "Bello" Snyder (February 7, 1912 – May 19, 1998) was an American professional basketball player. He played for the Buffalo Bisons in the National Basketball League during the 1937–38 season and averaged 5.8 points per game.

After basketball, Snyder and his wife owned and operated Camp Eagle Cove in the Adirondack Mountains.
