= Greece Olympia High School (Rochester, New York) =

Greece Olympia School

Location
- 1139 Maiden Ln; Rochester, New York 14615; United States
- 43°13′19″N 77°40′21″W

Information
- Type: Public
- School district: Greece Central School District
- NCES School ID: 361263001039
- Principal: Brandin Jones
- Teaching staff: 110.35 (on an FTE basis)
- Grades: 6-12
- Enrollment: 1,087 (2023-2024)
- Student to teacher ratio: 9.85
- Campus: Suburban
- Colors: Green and Gold
- Mascot: Spartans
- Yearbook: Epic
- Website: www.greececsd.org/o/olympia

Greece Olympia School is a high school located in Rochester, New York, United States. It is a member of Project Lead the Way. It is one of four high schools in the Greece Central School District, along with Greece Athena, Greece Arcadia, and Odyssey Academy.

== Notable alumni ==
- Daniel Armbruster - lead vocalist and primary lyricist of Joywave
- Hadji Barry – soccer player
- Gary Beikirch - United States Army medic and Medal of Honor recipient for actions during the Vietnam War.
- Paul Brenner - drummer and percussionist for Joywave
- Kirk Fordham - American political strategist and former congressional staffer.
- Jamie Lissow - American comedian, actor, writer, and producer
- Don Mancuso - American rock music guitarist and songwriter
- Joseph Morinelli - guitarist and a songwriter for Joywave
- Scott Virkus - football player; former defensive end for the Buffalo Bills, Indianapolis Colts, and New England Patriots
- Marcus Wilson – football player; former Green Bay Packer running back

== See also ==
- Greece Athena High School
- Greece Arcadia High School
- Odyssey Academy
