= Greece Athena High School =

Location
- 800 Long Pond Rd; Rochester, New York 14612; United States; 43°14′38″N 77°41′32″W

Information
- Type: Public
- Established: 1969; 57 years ago
- School district: Greece Central School District
- NCES School ID: 361263001032
- Principal: Jason Fulkerson
- Teaching staff: 95.94 (on an FTE basis)
- Grades: 9-12
- Enrollment: 1,057 (2023-2024)
- Student to teacher ratio: 11.02
- Campus: Suburban
- Colors: Black and Gold
- Mascot: Trojans
- Yearbook: Ekklesia
- Website: www.greececsd.org/o/aths

Greece Athena High School serves grades 9–12 as a part of the Greece Central School District in Greece, New York, a suburb of Rochester, New York. It occupies the 1st and 2nd floors of the Athena Complex and shares its library and the Greece Performing Arts Center (G.P.A.C.) with Greece Athena Middle School, which is located on the 3rd floor. The high school and middle school was visited by President George W. Bush in 2005.

The school gained increased prominence after the February 15, 2006, Trojans basketball game vs the Spencerport Rangers when basketball coach Jim Johnson inserted his team manager Jason McElwain with 4 minutes and 19 seconds left on the clock, McElwain, who has autism, ended up scoring twenty points including six three-point shots and one two-point shot, when the buzzer rang the crowd stormed the court in celebration and lifted McElwain on their shoulders.

== Notable alumni ==
- Donna Lynne Champlin Broadway actress
- Brett Giehl, better known as Dalton Castle, professional wrestler currently in Ring of Honor and previously in CHIKARA and Impact Wrestling
- Anthony Lamb current NBA player
- Kara Lindsay Broadway actress
- Jason McElwain, an autistic student, scored twenty points in his first high school basketball game. On July 12, 2006, ESPN awarded McElwain an ESPY Award in the "Best Sports Moment" category in recognition of his 20-point game.
- John Wallace former NBA player

== See also ==
- Greece Arcadia High School
- Greece Athena Middle School (same building and busing)
- Greece Olympia High School
- Greece Odyssey Academy
