= Arcadia High School (New York) =

Location
- 120 Island Cottage Rd; Rochester, New York 14612; United States
- Coordinates: 43°15′19″N 77°39′55″W

Information
- Type: Public
- School district: Greece Central School District
- NCES School ID: 361263001031
- Principal: Christina Wawrzyniak
- Teaching staff: 94.48 (on an FTE basis)
- Grades: 9-12
- Enrollment: 1,023 (2023-2024)
- Student to teacher ratio: 10.83
- Campus: Suburban
- Colors: Maroon, Black and White
- Mascot: Titans
- Yearbook: Chronos
- Website: www.greececsd.org/o/ahs

Arcadia High School is a public high school located in Greece, New York, serving grades 9–12. It is one of four high schools in the Greece Central School District. The school was built in 1963 and the new Arcadia Middle School was connected to it for the 1993 school year. Arcadia Middle School has the largest library in the district, which is shared by both the middle and high school. The mascot for the school is the titan.

== Enrollment ==
Students	1,253
12th Grade	272
Teaching Faculty	98
Student/Counselor Ratio	approx. 270 to 1
School Year	Four 10 week quarters
School Day	Six 55 minute blocks including a 30-minute lunch

NOTE: Enrollment data is from the 2009 - 2010 School Year

== Athletics ==
Students at Arcadia High School are eligible to participate in the following sports programs.

Fall Sports	Winter Sports	Spring Sports
Football	Boys' Basketball	Baseball
Boys' Soccer	Girls' Basketball	Softball
Cross-Country	Wrestling	Girls' Track
Girls' Soccer	Boys' Swimming	Boys' Track
Girls' Tennis	Ice Hockey	Boys' Tennis
Girls' Swimming	Indoor Track	Boys' Golf
Cheerleading	Cheerleading	Girls' Lacrosse
Gymnastics	Girls' Bowling	Boys' Lacrosse
Girls' Golf	Boys' Bowling	
Girls' Volleyball		
Boys' Volleyball		

== Notable alumni ==
- Dema Kovalenko, class of 1996, former MLS soccer player
- Megan Shoniker, class of 2007, college basketball coach
- Jeff Sluman, class of 1975, professional golfer

== See also ==
- Greece Athena High School
- Greece Olympia High School
- Greece Odyssey Academy
