= Scott Virkus =

American football player (born 1959)

No. 93, 70, 94, 78
- Position: Defensive end

Personal information
- Born: September 7, 1959 (age 67); Rochester, New York, U.S.
- Listed height: 6 ft 5 in (1.96 m)
- Listed weight: 260 lb (118 kg)

Career information
- High school: Olympia (Rochester)
- College: Purdue
- NFL draft: 1983: undrafted

Career history
- Buffalo Bills (1983–1984); Indianapolis Colts (1984); New England Patriots (1984); Indianapolis Colts (1985); Buffalo Bills (1986)*; Saskatchewan Roughriders (1986)
- * Offseason or practice squad member only

Career NFL statistics
- Sacks: 4
- Stats at Pro Football Reference

Scott Virkus (born September 7, 1959) is an American former professional football player who was a defensive end in the National Football League (NFL) and Canadian Football League (CFL). He played college football for the Purdue Boilermakers. He played in the NFL for the Buffalo Bills from 1983 to 1984, the Indianapolis Colts and New England Patriots in 1984 and for the Indianapolis Colts in 1985.

== Early life ==
Scott Virkus was born on September 7, 1959, in Rochester, New York. He attended Greece Olympia High School in Rochester.
