= Greece Central School District =

School district in New York, United States

Location
- 750 Maiden Lane; Rochester, New York 14615 Parts of the Town of Greece, New York United States
- Coordinates: 43.2256°N 77.6622°W

District information
- Type: Public
- Motto: Student learning is the goals
- Grades: Pre-K–12 and adult education
- Established: July 1928
- Superintendent: Jeremy Smalline
- Accreditation: New York State Education Department
- Schools: ·11 elementary schools (K–5) ·2 middle schools (6–8) ·2 combined middle/high school (6–12) ·2 senior high schools (9–12)
- Budget: ▲US$197.6 million (2011–2012)
- NCES District ID: 3612630

Students and staff
- Students: ▼11,923 (2011–2012)
- Teachers: ▼1,149 (2011–2012)
- Staff: ▼1,347 (2011–2012)

Other information
- Unions: NYSUT, Greece Teachers' Association
- Mailing Address: PO Box 300; North Greece, NY 14515
- Notes: www.greececsd.org/district.cfm
- Website: www.greececsd.org

The Greece Central School District is a public school district in New York State that serves approximately 14,000 students in the town of Greece in Monroe County with over 3,700 employees and an operating budget of $180 million (~$13,489 per student).

The average class size is 21 students and the student-teacher ratio is 23:1 (elementary), 14-19:1 (middle-high school).

Kathleen Graupman is the Superintendent of Schools.

== History ==
The Greece Central School District was created in July 1928 by combining the former Greece school districts 3, 11, and 16. Until the construction of Greece Olympia High School, students attended John Marshall or Hilton high schools.

Superintendents
Name	Tenure
Steven L. Walts	1998 – 2005
Josephine S. Kehoe (interim)	October 2005 – October 2006
Steven A. Achramovitch	November 2006 – June 2010
Donald O. Nadolinski (acting)	July 2010 – July 2010
John R. O’Rourke (interim)	July 2010 – June 2011
Barbara A. Deane–Williams	July 2011 – July 2015
Kathleen Graupman	July 2015 – Present

== Board of education ==
The Board of Education (BOE) consists of 9 members who serve rotating 3-year terms. Elections are held each May for board members and to vote on the School District Budget.

Current board members:

- Sean McCabe, President
- Terry Melore, Vice President
- Lisa Christoffel
- Richard Cunningham
- Joe Grinnan
- William Maloney
- Frank Oberg
- Mary Caitlin Wight
- Michael Valicenti

== Leadership ==
- Kathleen Graupman - Superintendent of Schools
- Richard Stutzman - Interim Deputy Superintendent
- Romeo Colilli - Assistant Superintendent for Finance and Administrative Services
- Elizabeth Bentley - Assistant Superintendent for Human Resources
- Kathryn Colicchio - Assistant Superintendent for Student Achievement and Accountability (Secondary)
- Valerie Paine - Assistant Superintendent for Student Achievement and Student Support Services (Elementary)

By convention, elementary schools are named after the road on which they are located. Middle and high schools use classical Greek names.

=== Elementary schools ===
- Autumn Lane, Principal - Tasha Potter, Assistant Principal - Kenneth Merkey
- Brookside, Principal - Anthony Reale, Assistant Principal - Kenneth Merkey
- Buckman Heights, Principal - Anitra Huchzermeier, Assistant Principal - Michelle Barton
- Craig Hill, Principal - Melissa Pacelli, Assistant Principal - Kenneth Merkey
- English Village, Principal - Cheryl Hurst, Assistant Principal - Jason Lewis
- Greece Community Early Learning Center, Principal - Tracy DelGrego, Assistant Principal - Derek Warren
- Holmes Road, Principal - Kristin Tsang, Assistant Principal - Michelle Barton
- Lakeshore, Principal - James Palermo, Assistant Principal - Jason Lewis
- Pine Brook, Principal - Elizabeth Boily, Assistant Principal - Deborah Goodman

=== Middle schools ===
- Arcadia Middle, Principal - Brian Lumb, Assistant Principals - Noelle Breedlove, Caroline Preston and Elizabeth Zaffino
- Athena Middle, Principal - Jason Fulkerson, Assistant Principals - Lori Delorme-Shaw and Norma Vetter

=== High schools ===
- Arcadia High, Principal - Christina Wawrzyniak, Assistant Principals - Susan Fix, Caroline Preston, Samantha Trott, and Jeremiah Johnson
- Athena High, Principal - Jason Fulkerson, Assistant Principals - Anna Madrid, Jennifer Ficarella, Mason Moore, and Lori Shaw

=== 6-12 schools ===
- Odyssey Academy (6-12), Principal - Dr. Corey Hepburn, Assistant Principals - Christina Kristofori (grades 6-8), Gabby Graves (9th and 10th grades), Josh Lacy (12th grade)
- Olympia School, Principal - Brandin Jones, Assistant Principals - Tony Tan (6th and 7th grades), Charles Passarell (8th grade), and Charles Loray (Grades 10-12)

== Performance ==
In June 2007, the American Music Conference recognized the district as being among the 2007 "Best 100 Communities for Music Education".

On May 23, 2005, president George W. Bush visited the Greece Central Performing Arts Center located in the Athena Complex which houses both Greece Athena Middle School and Greece Athena High School.

== Controversy ==
Controversy arose in June 2012 when several students from Greece Athena Middle School were caught on camera verbally and physically abusing school bus monitor Karen Klein during a bus ride. Soon after the video became public, local FM radio station WBZA (98.9 the Buzz) reported the story and it spread virally on the internet Making the Bus Monitor Cry. District officials have promised due process in handling the misconduct by the 7th grade boys
