= Jeremiah Goodman =

American painter (1922–2017)

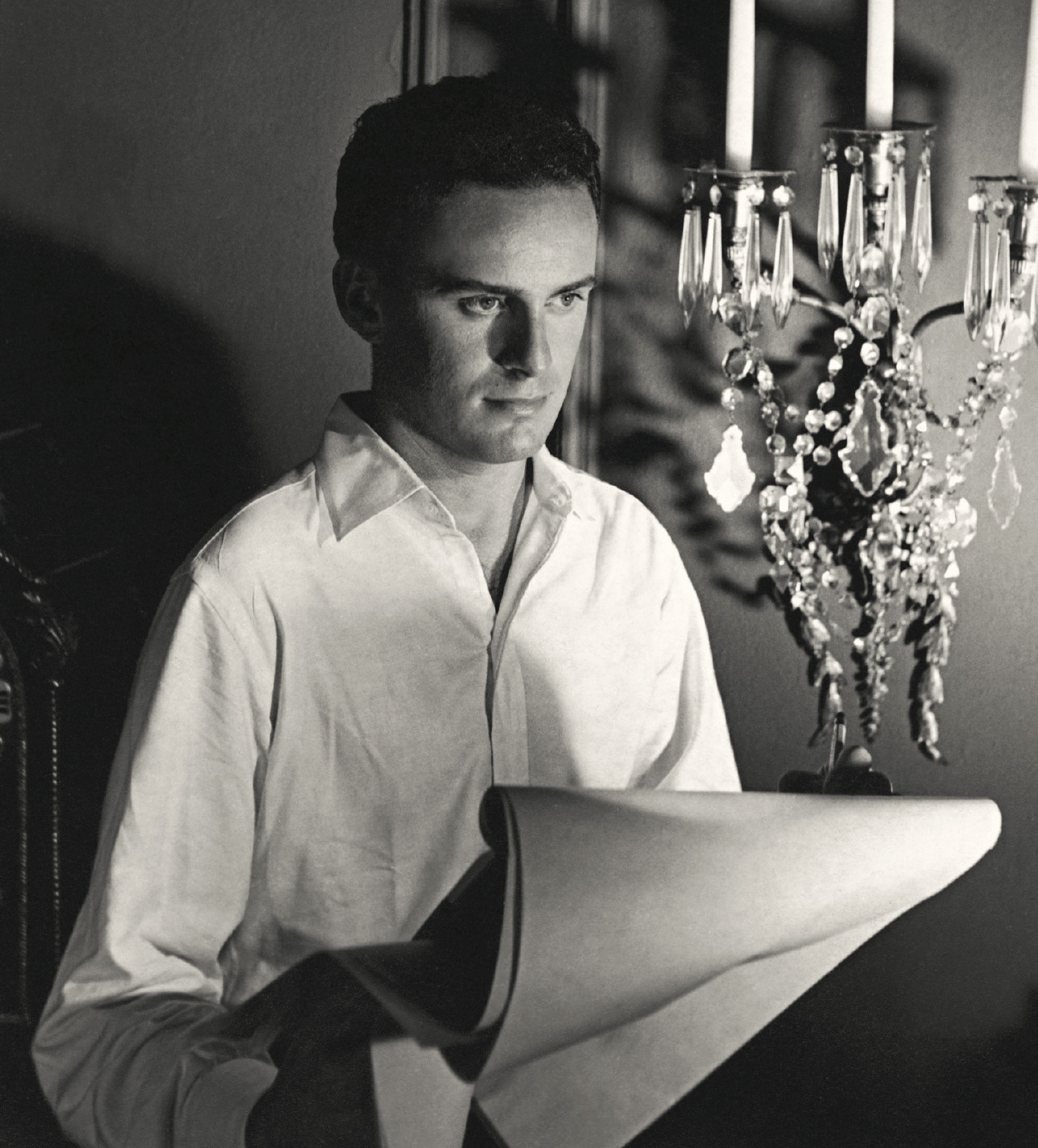
- Jeremiah Goodman in Manhattan, 1956
- Born: October 22, 1922; Buffalo, New York, U.S.
- Died: September 7, 2017 (aged 94); New York City, New York, U.S.
- Education: The New School, Fashion Institute of Technology
- Known for: Artist, Interior Illustrator
- Website: www.jeremiahgoodman.com

Jeremiah Goodman (October 22, 1922 – September 7, 2017) was an American illustrator who signed his work with his first name only. Goodman used his unique painting style to create the essence of a building's interior. His painting interprets the plans of both architects and interior designers. He painted original portraits of spaces for both commercial and private clients. For almost twenty years he created the covers for Interior Design magazine, and also books on interiors and for murals.

== Early life ==
Goodman was born October 22, 1922, in Niagara Falls, New York, the youngest of five children of Anna Cohen and Louis Goodman. His parents were Jewish emigrants from Russia and Poland. While convalescing from a right-hand injury at the age of four, he was given a set of crayons and adapted by becoming left-handed, and developed an interest in art.

== Education ==
In 1930 the family moved to Buffalo. During the Great Depression there was little work for his father, but Jeremiah was able to attend Lafayette High School, studying art with Elizabeth Weiffenbach and Ethel Davis, with the intention of becoming a set designer for Hollywood or Broadway. He graduated in 1939.

In 1940, at the age of 18, he moved to New York City to attend the Franklin School of Professional Art on a full scholarship. After graduating, he studied part-time at Parsons School of Design, then known as the New York School of Fine and Applied Arts, enrolling in interior decoration and commercial illustration courses.

== Influences ==
Painters John Singer Sargent, J. M. W. Turner, Édouard Vuillard and Walter Gay. Architect John Nash Japanese ink brush painting, Zen calligraphy. Turkish-born, California-based interior designer, Kalef Alaton. Betty Carter, his painting instructor at Parsons School of Design. David Payne, Art teacher at the Franklin School.

In 1948, Jeremiah met British actor John Gielgud, and travelled with him to Europe for the first time in 1949. Gielgud encouraged him to paint room portraits, a pursuit which would continue throughout his life. At the same time, another painter, William Bankier Henderson, aide-de-camp to Sir Archibald Wavell, the Viceroy of India, introduced him to a stratum of people who allowed him to paint interpretations of rooms in their residences.

In 1949, Jeremiah was given entry to the hidden Parisian maisons of illustrious fashion designer Jeanne Lanvin and her daughter, Marguerite Marie-Blanche. Their home decor department, Lanvin-Décoration, was run by Armand-Albert Rateau, who, along with Lanvin, designed the interior of the Daunou Theatre in 1921. Lanvin’s motto, "Art and fashion are one" is evident in Jeremiah's creative endeavours as well.

He attributes Frances Hodgson Burnett's novel, The Secret Garden (1910–11) as an inspiration for the layout of his East Hampton home.

== Career ==
=== Beginnings ===
His first job in New York was for window display designers Sue Williams and Dana Cole, while attending school. During WWII, he returned to Buffalo, trained as a machinist with and worked for Curtiss-Wright in their experimental division.

=== Set design ===
In 1945 he moved to Los Angeles, hired by stage and screen interiors set designer, Joseph B. Platt (designer on films Gone with the Wind, Rebecca, and Portrait of Jennie), as an illustrator/sketch artist. After an offer to decorate the set of a Hollywood jungle film, he was frustrated, realizing that his talents were not being fully utilized and returned to New York City.

=== Display design ===
In Manhattan, he did whatever he could to earn a living as an illustrator and designer, creating window displays for Sachs Quality Stores and McCrory's, keeping an entrepreneurial eye out for opportunities.

From 1952, for over thirty years, he worked for Lord & Taylor department stores under the Art Direction of Harry Rodman, first designing windows, painting murals and eventually illustrating advertisements and catalogues.

=== Advertising illustration ===
As the relationship with Lord & Taylor developed, he created fashion illustrations and advertising for magazines and newspapers, most notably, The New York Times. His unique brushwork and spatter techniques, perspectively accurate yet spontaneous, influenced architectural illustrators for decades.

=== Editorial illustration ===
In 1949, Jeremiah began illustrating the covers of Interior Design magazine, an assignment that continued until late 1964. In the same period, he created illustrations for Harper's Bazaar, House & Garden and Vogue magazines.

=== Book illustration ===
1964 My Favorite Things: A Personal Guide to Decorating and Entertaining by Dorothy (Feiner) Rodgers, wife of Richard Rodgers. Macmillan 1964, ISBN 0-689-70548-4 1997 The Illustrated Room: 20th Century Interior Design Rendering, by Virma Barr, ed. Dani Antman, McGraw-Hill ISBN 0-07-006131-9 2010 The Great Lady Decorators: Lessons from the Women Who Invented Interior Design, by Adam Lewis, Rizzoli 2010, ISBN 0-8478-3336-4

=== Interior design commissions ===
- McMillen Inc.: The Metropolitan Museum of Art Centennial Celebration presentation rendering
- Ruby Ross Wood
- Billy Baldwin: Portrait of Diana Vreeland's living room
- Dorothy Draper
- Melanie Kahane
- Eleanor LeMaire
- William Pahlmann
- Michael Greer

=== Architect commissions ===
- Buckminster Fuller – Century 21, Seattle World's Fair, 1962
- Wallace K. Harrison – Master plan for Lincoln Center, 1957
- Skidmore, Owings & Merrill
- I.M. Pei
- Raymond Loewy
- Philip Johnson

=== Murals ===
- Commissions for numerous private residences in the United States and Japan.
- 2010 – ACNE Studios fashion and design collective, Mayfair, London. (N.B. – ACNE is an acronym for Ambition to Create Novel Expressions)

=== Room portraits ===
Often the rooms were sketched on the spot. If time and space permitted they would be painted there as well. Otherwise, he would return to his studio to execute the final, working from photographs and from memory.

Introductions to numerous people in the U.S. theatre and film worlds opened doors for Jeremiah. Many commissioned him paint portraits of their residences, notably, stage, screen and TV producer Daniel Melnick, actresses Greta Garbo and Mary Martin, costume designers Edith Head, Gilbert Adrian and Tony Duquette.

Aside from Gielgud's, over the decades Jeremiah painted European interior spaces of photographer/set designer Cecil Beaton, designer David Hicks, Wallis, Duchess of Windsor (U.K.); artist Pablo Picasso, Baron Philippe de Rothschild, Carlos de Beistegui (France); jewelry designer Elsa Perretti (Spain); fashion designer Elsa Schiaparelli (Italy). He also painted interpretations of the Nymphenburg Palace, Bavaria.

Stateside, he made drawings or paintings of the residences of Ronald Reagan; socialite Betsy Bloomingdale; fashion designers Carolina Herrera, Bill Blass and James Galanos; Vogue Editor Diana Vreeland, fashion executive Reed Krakoff of Coach Inc.; photographer Bruce Weber and his wife, producer Nan Bush.

== Interior design ==
=== East Hampton, New York ===
In 1957 Jeremiah purchased a carriage house on Long Island, NY, at 14 Meadows Way, East Hampton, built by architect Joseph Greenleaf Thorp for the J. Harper Poor family, circa 1917. Constructed around a courtyard, where Goodman installed an in-ground swimming pool; banks of French doors and windows overlook gardens planned by Alden Hopkins, a landscape architect for Colonial Williamsburg. The cast-iron circular staircase, stucco fireplace and slate flooring, though designated by Goodman, feel like a part of the original building. Art, collectibles, antiques and contemporary furniture were arranged to offer intimate spaces. A studio on the second floor gave him privacy to work if there were guests. Playwright Edward Albee, sculptor Louise Nevelson, actresses Mary Martin and Hermione Gingold were visitors, as well as designer friends Marjorie Shushan, Mark Epstein, Geoffrey Ross, John Dranfield and Harry Heissmann.

=== Manhattan ===
His New York City apartment and studio overlooked the East River and Queensborough bridge. Occupying a corner unit on a lofty floor of a 1970s vintage skyscraper, with two walls of windows. It was featured in Architectural Digest twice.

== Quotes ==
"In the realm of interior paintings, the work of Jeremiah Goodman stands out as among the most beautiful and influential. ---one of the greatest masters of interior illustration of our time.” – Scott M. Ageloff, IDEC, ASID, AIA (from the catalogue, Inspired Impressions: Interior Paintings by Jeremiah Goodman NYSID 2010)

"He conjures up space by combining a deceptively casual perspective (his choice of viewpoint is impeccable, his drawing always accurate) with plays of light and shadow that delineate form while creating atmosphere." "His black-and-white illustration style shows, … evidence of Japanese brush painting… most striking in the orchestrations of black, white and gray. The perspective in each image is always credible, though the looseness of the brush strokes and spatters of ink or paint imply a sense of spontaneity in their making." – Christopher Finch, Architectural Digest, February 2002.

"Three-dimensional rendering allows architects and interior designers to advise their clients with a visual of how a room would look before construction and decoration begins. Renderers require training in design, perspective, art, familiarity with building materials and textiles, knowledge of light and shadow, combined with imagination in order to prescribe the yet-to-be-created interior a personality. They must work quickly to meet deadlines. Various techniques and media have been utilized over the centuries by renderers: pen and ink, pencil, chalk, water-colour and guache paints and most recently, computer assisted drawing (CAD). A “room painting” differs from a rendering in that it is a portrait made after the job has been completed. In a sense, it is superior in preserving the essential mood of an interior once it has been dismantled or revamped, even if there is a photographic record." – The Illustrated Room: 20th Century Interior Design Rendering, by Virma Barr, ed. Dani Antman, McGraw-Hill 1997, ISBN 0-07-006131-9

== Awards ==
Hall of Fame Special Citation Recipient – Interior Design magazine, December 1987.

== Collections ==
Illustrations by Jeremiah Goodman may be found in the permanent collections of:

- Cooper-Hewitt National Design Museum, New York, NY,
- The Metropolitan Museum of Art, New York, NY,
- The New Britain Museum of American Art and private collections.

== Exhibitions ==
In 2017, the Los Angeles Design Fournir Gallery held a 70 year retrospective of Goodman's work that was curated by Dean Rhys Morgan. Over 50 of his original paintings were displayed and orders were taken at the gallery opening for personally signed copies of his book Jeremiah: Romantic Interiors on May 10, 2017.
