= Ford Administration Building =

- U.S. National Register of Historic Places
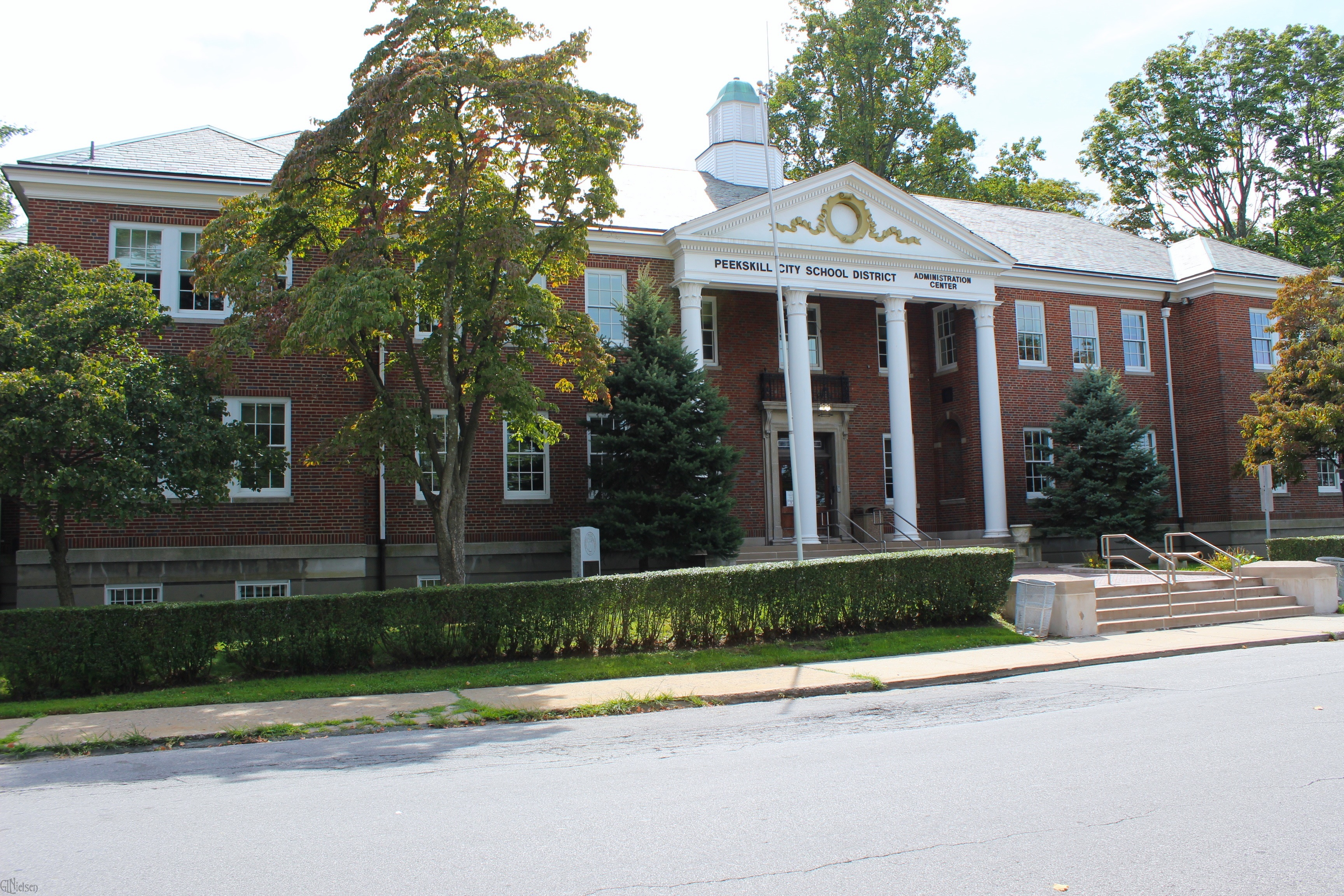
- The Ford Administration Building, currently the headquarters of the Peekskill City School District Administration.

- Location within New York Location within the United States
- Location: 1031 Elm Street, Peekskill, New York
- Coordinates: 41°17′17″N 73°55′1″W
- Area: 2.2 acres (0.89 ha)
- Built: 1925
- Architect: Frank A. Moore
- Architectural style: Colonial Revival
- NRHP reference No.: 06000258
- Added to NRHP: April 12, 2006

The Ford Administration Building is a historic school in Peekskill, New York. It was built in 1925 and is a two-story, I-shaped, red brick building in the Colonial Revival style. It features a central portico with four Doric order columns. The slate covered hipped roof is topped by a cupola. It houses the 500-seat Ford Auditorium. It was built for the Peekskill Military Academy (1833–1968) and is the last significant structure remaining from the academy.

It was added to the National Register of Historic Places in 2006.
