= Villa Maria Motherhouse Complex =

- U.S. National Register of Historic Places
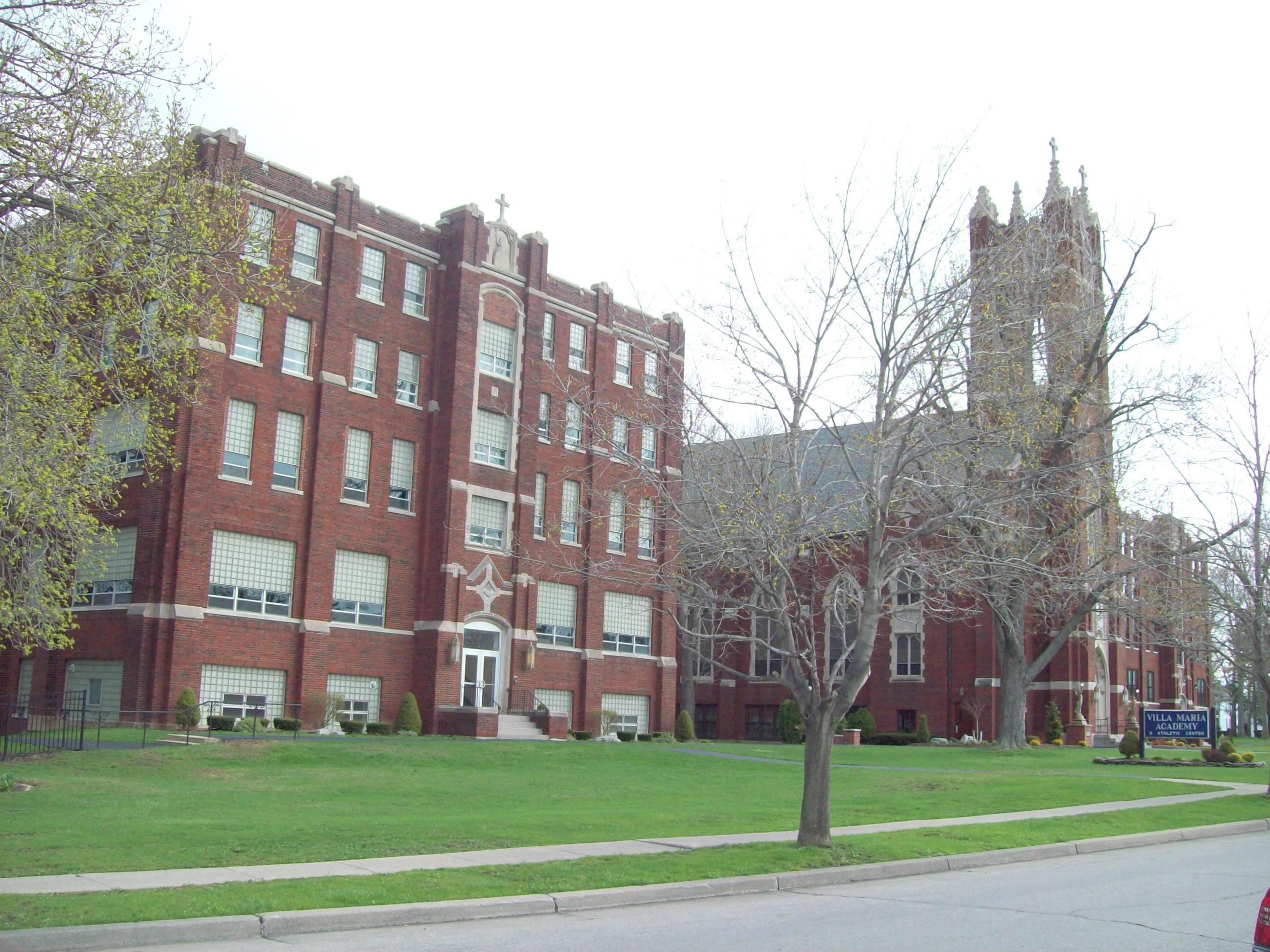
- Villa Maria Motherhouse Complex, April 2010

- Location within New York Location within the United States
- Interactive map showing the location for Villamarie Motherhouse Complex
- Location: 600 Doat St., Cheektowaga, New York
- Coordinates: 42°54′37″N 78°47′55″W
- Built: 1927
- Architect: Sandel and Strong; Fronczak, Joseph
- Architectural style: Late Gothic Revival
- NRHP reference No.: 06000571
- Added to NRHP: July 14, 2006

Villa Maria Motherhouse Complex, or Felician Sisters Immaculate Heart of Mary Convent Chapel and Convent, is a historic Roman Catholic convent located at Cheektowaga in Erie County, New York. It is included in the Roman Catholic Diocese of Buffalo. It was constructed in 1927, and is a three-part Gothic Revival building that was built for the Felician Sisters of St. Francis to house a boarding and day high school, public and private chapels and the Motherhouse/Novitiate. The school, known as Villa Maria Academy, closed in 2006. The school property was repurposed as affordable housing for seniors.

It was listed on the National Register of Historic Places in 2006.

== Alumni ==
- Christine Baranski, American stage and screen actress
