= Sebastian Barrie =

American football player (1970–2025)

No. 67, 73, 90, 78
- Positions: Defensive end, defensive tackle

Personal information
- Born: May 26, 1970; Dallas, Texas, U.S.
- Died: July 31, 2025 (aged 55)
- Listed height: 6 ft 2 in (1.88 m)
- Listed weight: 275 lb (125 kg)

Career information
- High school: Lincoln
- College: Liberty
- NFL draft: 1992: undrafted

Career history
- Green Bay Packers (1992); San Francisco 49ers (1994)*; Arizona Cardinals (1994); San Diego Chargers (1995); Philadelphia Eagles (1996)*; Albany Firebirds (1997); Arizona Rattlers (1999–2003); San Jose SaberCats (2004–2005)
- * Offseason or practice squad member only

Awards and highlights
- ArenaBowl champion (2004)

Career NFL statistics
- Tackles: 11
- Stats at Pro Football Reference

Career AFL statistics
- Tackles: 41
- Sacks: 11
- Forced fumbles: 8
- Stats at ArenaFan.com

Sebastian J. L. Barrie (May 26, 1970 – July 31, 2025) was an American professional football player who was a defensive end and tackle in the National Football League (NFL).

== Background ==
Barrie was born in Dallas, Texas, on May 26, 1970. He died from cancer on July 31, 2025, at the age of 55.

== Career ==
Barrie was a member of the Green Bay Packers during the 1992 NFL season. After a year away from the NFL, he joined the Arizona Cardinals for the 1994 NFL season, and the San Diego Chargers the season after that.

He played at the collegiate level at Liberty University and Prairie View A&M University.
