= Marcus Wilson (American football) =

American football player (born 1968)

No. 40, 29
- Position: Running back

Personal information
- Born: April 16, 1968 (age 58); Rochester, New York, U.S.
- Listed height: 6 ft 1 in (1.85 m)
- Listed weight: 215 lb (98 kg)

Career information
- High school: Greece (Rochester)
- College: Virginia (1986–1989)
- NFL draft: 1990: 6th round, 149th overall pick
- Expansion draft: 1995: 21st round, 41st overall pick

Career history
- Los Angeles Raiders (1990)*; Indianapolis Colts (1990)*; Los Angeles Raiders (1991); Green Bay Packers (1992–1994); Jacksonville Jaguars (1995)*; Green Bay Packers (1995)
- * Offseason or practice squad member only

Awards and highlights
- Second-team All-ACC (1989)

Career NFL statistics
- Rushing yards: 24
- Rushing average: 2
- Receptions: 2
- Receiving yards: 18
- Stats at Pro Football Reference

Edmond Marcus Wilson (born April 16, 1968) is an American former professional football player who was a running back for five seasons in the National Football League (NFL) with the Los Angeles Raiders and Green Bay Packers. He was selected by the Raiders in the sixth round of the 1990 NFL draft after playing college football for the Virginia Cavaliers.

== Early life ==
Edmond Marcus Wilson was born on April 16, 1968, in Rochester, New York. He attended Greece Olympia High School in Rochester.

== College career ==
Wilsom was a member of the Virginia Cavaliers of the University of Virginia from 1986 to 1989 and a three-year letterman from 1987 to 1989. In 1987, he recorded 172 carries for 692 yards and seven touchdowns, 18 receptions for 134 yards, and 11 kick returns for 212 yards. His seven rushing touchdowns were the most in the Atlantic Coast Conference (ACC) that season. Wilson rushed 89 times for 429 yards and two touchdowns in 1988 while also catching seven passes for 25 yards and one touchdown. As a senior in 1989, he totaled 233 rushing attempts for 1,098 yards and four touchdowns, 20 receptions for 161 yards and two touchdowns, and 15 kick returns for 284 yards. He was named second-team All-ACC by the Associated Press for his performance during the 1989 season.

== Professional career ==
Wilson was selected by the Los Angeles Raiders in the sixth round, with the 149th overall pick, of the 1990 NFL draft. He was waived by the Raiders on August 28, 1990.

Wilson was claimed off waivers by the Indianapolis Colts on August 29, 1990, but soon released on September 3, 1990.

Wilson signed with the Raiders again on March 1, 1991. He was the allocated to the World League of American Football to play for the Frankfurt Galaxy. However, he did not end up playing for the Galaxy. Wilson was released by the Raiders on August 30 and signed to the team's practice squad on September 4. He was promoted to the active roster on September 21, released on September 28, and signed to the practice squad again on October 2, 1991. Overall, he played in one game for the Raiders during the 1991 season, rushing six times for 21 yards. Wilson became a free agent after the season.

Wilson was signed by the Green Bay Packers on January 30, 1992. He was placed on injured reserve on September 1 and later activated on November 20, 1992. He played in six games for the Packers that year but did not record any statistics. Wilson appeared in all 16 games in 1993, recording six carries for three yards, two receptions for 18 yards on two targets, nine kick returns for 197 yards, one fumble, and one fumble recovery. He also played in two playoff games that season, returning one kick for 17 yards. He appeared in 12 games for the Packers in 1994 and returned two kicks for 14 yards. He was placed on injured reserve on December 27, 1994.

Wilson was selected by the Jacksonville Jaguars with the 41st overall pick of the 1995 NFL expansion draft. He was later released by the Jaguars on May 30, 1995.

Wilson re-signed with the Packers on June 21, 1995. He played in 14 games for the Packers in 1995. He also appeared in three playoff games, posting one solo tackle. Wilson was released on February 16, 1996.
