= Lafayette High School (Buffalo, New York) =

- U.S. National Register of Historic Places
- New York State Register of Historic Places
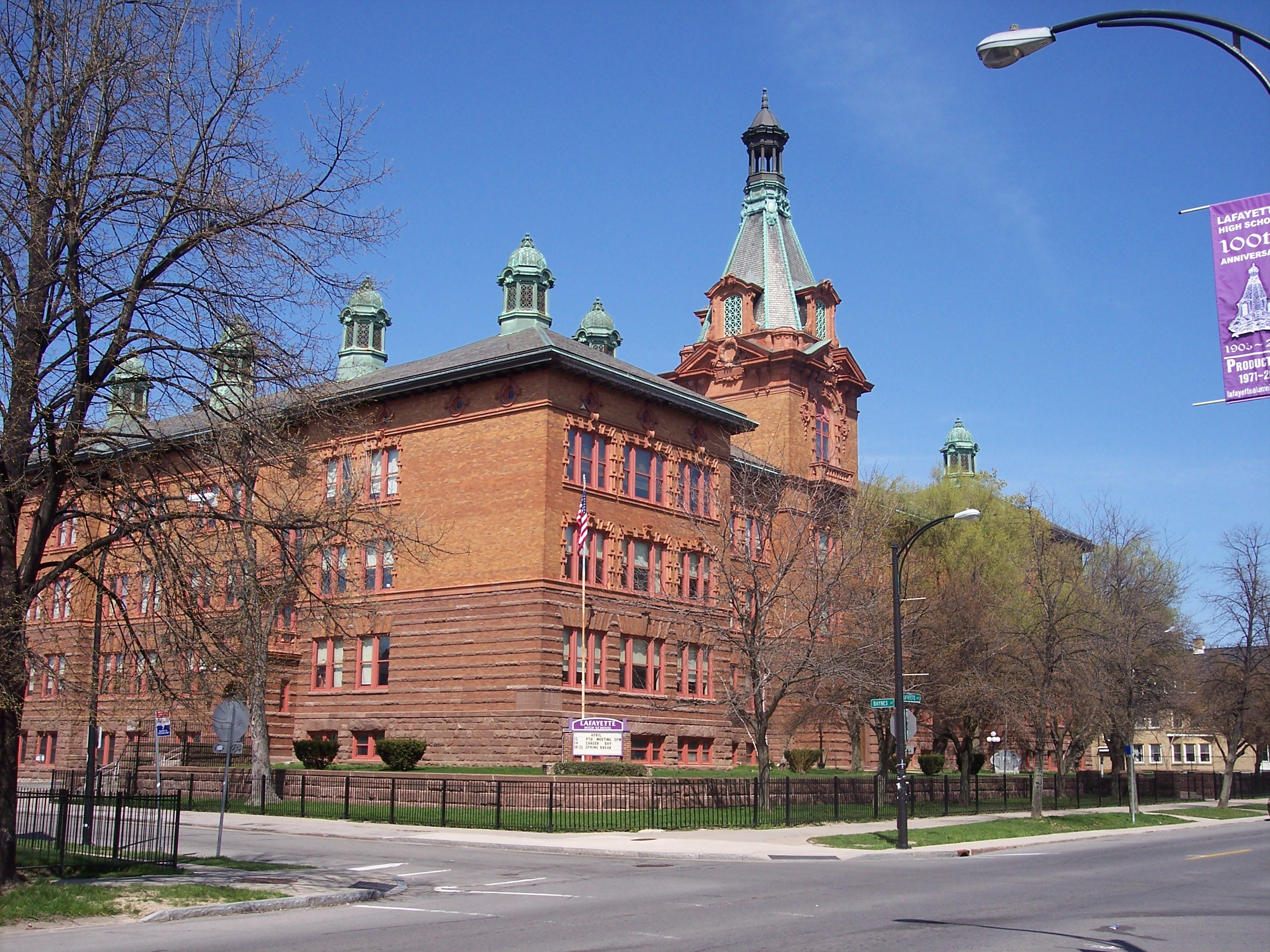
- Lafayette High School, Buffalo NY, April 2011

- Location within New York Location within the United States
- Location: 370 Lafayette Ave., Buffalo, New York
- Coordinates: 42°55′15″N 78°53′5″W
- Built: 1901
- Architect: Esenwein & Johnson
- Architectural style: Beaux Arts
- NRHP reference No.: 80002608
- NYSRHP No.: 02940.004622

Significant dates
- Added to NRHP: December 3, 1980
- Designated NYSRHP: October 23, 1980

Lafayette High School
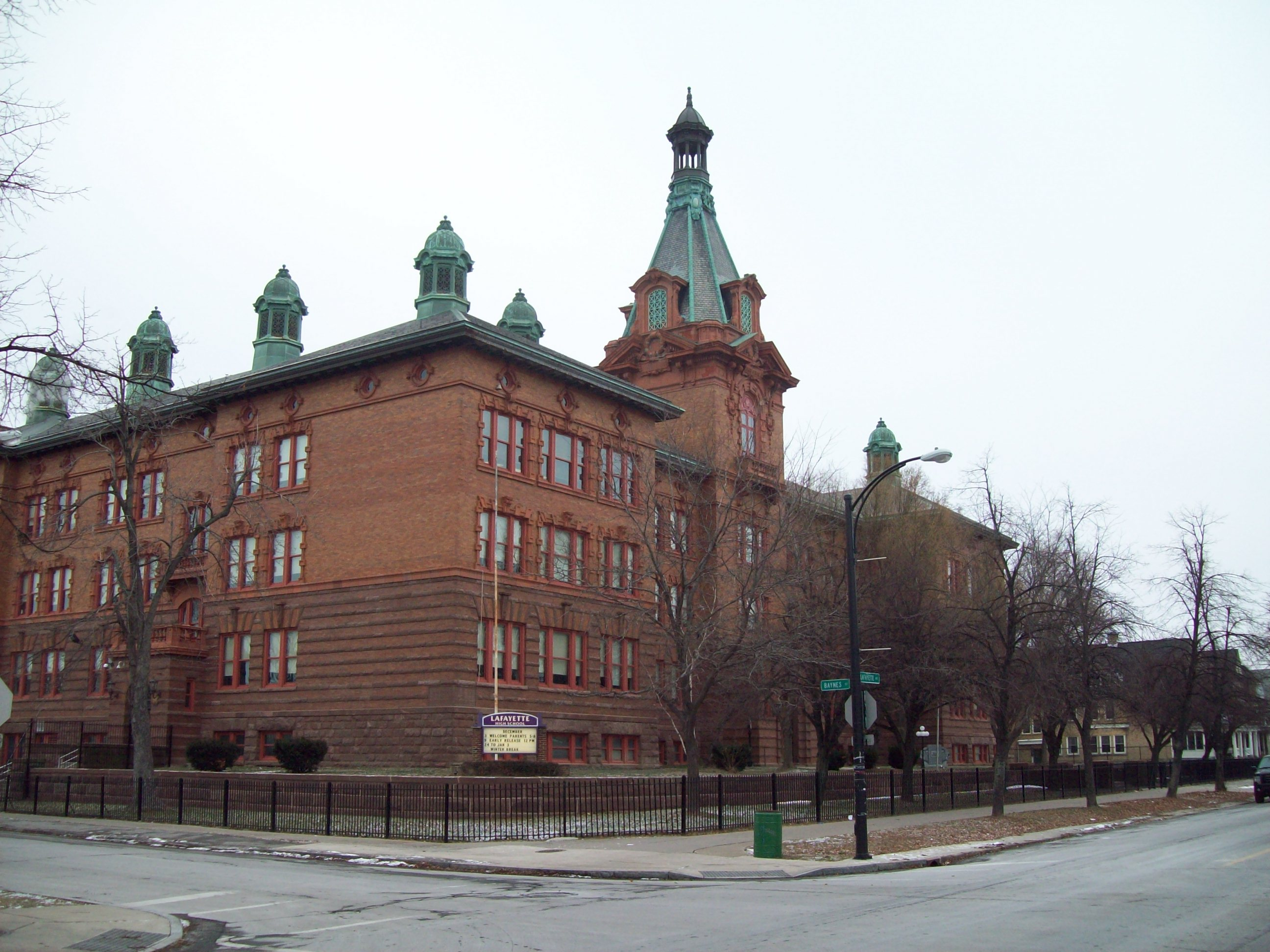

Location
- 370 Lafayette Avenue; West Side; Buffalo, Erie, New York 14213; United States

Information
- Motto: Loyalty, Honor, Service
- Established: 1901
- School district: Buffalo Public Schools
- School number: 204
- Grades: 9-12
- Colors: Violet and White
- Team name: Violets
- Newspaper: The Triangle
- Yearbook: The Oracle

Lafayette High School was a public high school in Buffalo, New York. It was the oldest public school in Buffalo that remained in its original building, a stone, brick and terra-cotta structure in the French Renaissance Revival style by architects August Esenwein and James A. Johnson. Although classes began off-site during construction of the school, the building was completed and graduated its first class in 1903. It was added to the National Register of Historic Places in 1980. It is located in Buffalo's Upper West Side at 370 Lafayette Avenue.

The name Lafayette High School was phased out beginning in 2015; the school graduated its final class in 2018, and was replaced by the name Lafayette International High School and Newcomers Academy. Classes continue to be held in the historic building.

== History ==
Lafayette High School was the third high school built in Buffalo, New York. It has fallen into recent struggles with academics and has been placed on New York State's Watch List of Persistently Underperforming Schools. After the 2010–2011 school year, the school re-opened as a multicultural school with a new principal. The school also began housing seventh and eighth graders from nearby International School 45. This arrangement continued until 2015.

== Notable alumni ==
- Gordon Bunshaft (class of 1928), noted twentieth-century architect.
- Robert J. Donovan (class of 1932), Washington Bureau Chief, New York Herald Tribune and Los Angeles Times. President, White House Correspondents' Association. Author of 12 books including PT-109. Only journalist to ever address a Joint Session of Congress.
- Liz Dribben (class of 1954), first female news anchor on Buffalo television, copy writer at CBS News for Dan Rather, Walter Cronkite, and Charles Kuralt. Member of the Buffalo Broadcasting Hall of Fame.
- Jeremiah Goodman (class of 1939), artist, known simply as "Jeremiah", painter of interior still lifes of famous residences.
- Cecil de Blaquiere Howard (class of 1903), noted sculptor who lived in Paris, France from 1905 to 1940, and in New York until his death in 1956.
- Barney Lepper (class of 1915), founder of the Buffalo All-Stars, which eventually became the city's first NFL team
- Gary Mallaber (class of 1964), Multiple platinum selling drummer and producer involved with acts such as The Steve Miller Band, Van Morrison and Eddie Money.
- Fran Striker (class of 1922), author, creator of the radio serial The Lone Ranger.
- Bruce Shanks (class of 1927), Pulitzer Prize-winning political cartoonist.
- Winifred C. Stanley (class of 1927), attorney and first member of congress to introduce legislation prohibiting discrimination in pay on account of sex
- Frank Kelly Freas (class of 1938), famed science-fiction cover artist.
- The Modernaires (Hal Dickinson, Chuck Goldstein, and Bill Conway, late 1930s), the popular harmony group renowned for its performances on record and motion pictures with the Glenn Miller Orchestra.
- Tedd Lewin (class of 1953), artist, author and illustrator of children's books.
- Edward C. Lawson (class of 1964), Edward won a landmark Supreme Court victory over racism and arbitrary stop and seizure practices by California police by defending himself before the Supreme Court of the US. [Lawson v. Kolender, 658 F.2d 1362 (9th Cir. 1981) October 15, 1981 et seq.].
- Charles Reidpath Olympic gold medalist
- Bobby Militello jazz saxophonist
- Jack Smart (class of 1922), a Broadway and radio actor known for “The Fat Man” program and later an artist

The public school is supported by the private Lafayette High School Alumni Association. In 1999, the association restored the building's landmark lantern or "cupola", which had deteriorated and been demolished for safety reasons in the 1970s. In May 2003, the association sponsored and ran a 100th Anniversary Celebration, attended by over 1,700 alumni and their guests, raising $30,000 for the school. The funds will establish the Ramsi P. Tick media room in memory of entrepreneur Tick, an LHS alumnus and philanthropist. The association also awards several annual grants and scholarships for worthy causes and students, and on Sunday, August 4, 2013 is holding a free All-Class Reunion to celebrate the school's one hundred and tenth year.

As their logos, the school and the Association use the LHS Triangle (Lafayette High School; Loyalty, Honor, Service), and the Lafayette Angel.

== Former principals ==
Previous assignment and reason for departure denoted in parentheses

- Arthur Detmers–1903-1906 (unknown, named Instructor of The Hill School)
- Calvert King Mellen–1906-1934 (Math teacher - Buffalo Central High School, retired)
- Frank Gott–1934-1955 (Vice Principal - Lafayette High School, retired)
- Abraham Axelrod–1955-1958 (Assistant Principal - Kensington High School, died)
- Robert C. McGowan–1958-1968 (Assistant Principal - East High School, retired)
- Gerald S. Hare–1968-1972 (Assistant Principal - East High School, transferred to Buffalo Public Schools District Offices)
- Frederick D. Ganter–1972-1997 (Assistant Principal - East High School, retired)
- Sharon A. Lanza–1997-2004 (Assistant Principal - Lafayette High School, retired)
- Jacquelyn M. Baldwin–2004-2008 (Assistant Principal - City Honors School, transferred to Office Of School Performance)
- Phyllis F. Morrell–2008-2011 (Principal on Assignment - McKinley Vocational High School, named Principal of Dr. Lydia T. Wright School of Excellence)
- Naomi R. Cerre–2011-2015 (Assistant Principal - McKinley High School, returned to McKinley)
- Denise E. Clarke–2015-2017 (Principal - Riverside Institute of Technology, retired)
- Michael J. Mogavero–2017-2018 (Principal - Academy School 131, named Principal of Math, Science, Technology Preparatory School @ 39)

=== Selected former administrators ===
Year	Superintendent	Principal
1903–1904	Henry Emerson	Art Detmers
1904–1905	Henry Emerson	Art Detmers
1905–1906	Henry Emerson	Art Detmers
1906–1907	Henry Emerson	Cap Mellen
1907–1908	Henry Emerson	Cap Mellen
1908–1909	Henry Emerson	Cap Mellen
1909–1910	Henry Emerson	Cap Mellen
1910–1911	Henry Emerson	Cap Mellen
1911–1912	Henry Emerson	Cap Mellen
1912–1913	Henry Emerson	Cap Mellen
1913–1914	Henry Emerson	Cap Mellen
1914–1915	Henry Emerson	Cap Mellen
1915–1916	Henry Emerson	Cap Mellen
1916–1917	Henry Emerson	Cap Mellen
1917–1918	Henry Emerson	Cap Mellen
1918–1919	Ernst Hartwell	Cap Mellen
1919–1920	Ernst Hartwell	Cap Mellen
1920–1921	Ernst Hartwell	Cap Mellen
1921–1922	Ernst Hartwell	Cap Mellen
1922–1923	Ernst Hartwell	Cap Mellen
1923–1924	Ernst Hartwell	Cap Mellen
1924–1925	Ernst Hartwell	Cap Mellen
1925–1926	Ernst Hartwell	Cap Mellen
1926–1927	Ernst Hartwell	Cap Mellen
1927–1928	Ernst Hartwell	Cap Mellen
1928–1929	Ernst Hartwell	Cap Mellen
1929–1930	Ernst Hartwell	Cap Mellen
1930–1931	Ernst Hartwell	Cap Mellen
1931–1932	Ernst Hartwell	Cap Mellen
1932–1933	Ernst Hartwell	Cap Mellen
1933–1934	Ernst Hartwell	Cap Mellen
1934–1935	Ernst Hartwell	Frank Gott
1935–1936	Robert Pabst	Frank Gott
1936–1937	Robert Pabst	Frank Gott
1937–1938	Robert Pabst	Frank Gott
1938–1939	Robert Pabst	Frank Gott
1939–1940	Robert Pabst	Frank Gott
1940–1941	Robert Pabst	Frank Gott
1941–1942	Robert Pabst	Frank Gott
1942–1943	Robert Pabst	Frank Gott
1943–1944	Robert Pabst	Frank Gott
1944–1945	Robert Pabst	Frank Gott
1945–1946	Robert Pabst	Frank Gott
1946–1947	Robert Pabst	Frank Gott
1947–1948	Robert Pabst	Frank Gott
1948–1949	Robert Pabst	Frank Gott
1949–1950	Robert Pabst	Frank Gott
1950–1951	Ben Willis	Frank Gott
1951–1952	Ben Willis	Frank Gott
1952–1953	Parmer Ewing	Frank Gott
1953–1954	Parmer Ewing	Frank Gott
1954–1955	Parmer Ewing	Frank Gott
1955–1956	Parmer Ewing	Abe Axelrod
1956–1957	Parmer Ewing	Abe Axelrod
1957–1958	Joe Manch	Abe Axelrod
1958–1959	Joe Manch	Rob McGowan
1959–1960	Joe Manch	Rob McGowan
1960–1961	Joe Manch	Rob McGowan
1961–1962	Joe Manch	Rob McGowan
1962–1963	Joe Manch	Rob McGowan
1963–1964	Joe Manch	Rob McGowan
1964–1965	Joe Manch	Rob McGowan
1965–1966	Joe Manch	Rob McGowan
1966–1967	Joe Manch	Rob McGowan
1967–1968	Joe Manch	Rob McGowan
1968–1969	Joe Manch	Gerald Hare
1969–1970	Joe Manch	Gerald Hare
1970–1971	Joe Manch	Gerald Hare
1971–1972	Joe Manch	Gerald Hare
1972–1973	Joe Manch	Rick Ganter
1973–1974	Joe Manch	Rick Ganter
1974–1975	Joe Manch	Rick Ganter
1975–1976	Eugene Reville	Rick Ganter
1976–1977	Eugene Reville	Rick Ganter
1977–1978	Eugene Reville	Rick Ganter
1978–1979	Eugene Reville	Rick Ganter
1979–1980	Eugene Reville	Rick Ganter
1980–1981	Eugene Reville	Rick Ganter
1981–1982	Eugene Reville	Rick Ganter
1982–1983	Eugene Reville	Rick Ganter
1983–1984	Eugene Reville	Rick Ganter
1984–1985	Eugene Reville	Rick Ganter
1985–1986	Eugene Reville	Rick Ganter
1986–1987	Eugene Reville	Rick Ganter
1987–1988	Eugene Reville	Rick Ganter
1988–1989	Eugene Reville	Rick Ganter
1989–1990	Eugene Reville	Rick Ganter
1990–1991	Albert Thompson	Rick Ganter
1991–1992	Albert Thompson	Rick Ganter
1992–1993	Albert Thompson	Rick Ganter
1993–1994	Albert Thompson	Rick Ganter
1994–1995	Albert Thompson	Rick Ganter
1995–1996	Albert Thompson	Rick Ganter
1996–1997	Jim Harris	Rick Ganter
1997–1998	Jim Harris	Sharon Lanza
1998–1999	Jim Harris	Sharon Lanza
1999–2000	Jim Harris	Sharon Lanza
2000–2001	Marion Canedo	Sharon Lanza
2001–2002	Marion Canedo	Sharon Lanza
2002–2003	Marion Canedo	Sharon Lanza
2003–2004	Marion Canedo	Sharon Lanza
2004–2005	Yvonne Hargrave*	Jackie Baldwin
2005–2006	James Williams	Jackie Baldwin
2006–2007	James Williams	Jackie Baldwin
2007–2008	James Williams	Jackie Baldwin
2008–2009	James Williams	Fatima Morrell
2009–2010	James Williams	Fatima Morrell
2010–2011	James Williams	Fatima Morrell
2011–2012	Amber Dixon*	Naomi Cerre*
2012–2013	Pam Brown	Naomi Cerre
2013–2014	Pam Brown	Naomi Cerre
2014–2015	Don Ogilivie*	Naomi Cerre
2015–2016	Kriner Cash	Denise Clarke
2016–2017	Kriner Cash	Denise Clarke
2017–2018	Kriner Cash	Mike Mogavero

== Gallery ==
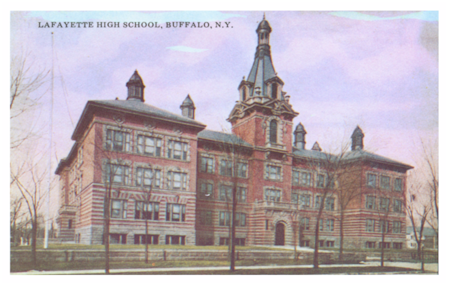
Lafayette High School, ca. 1901

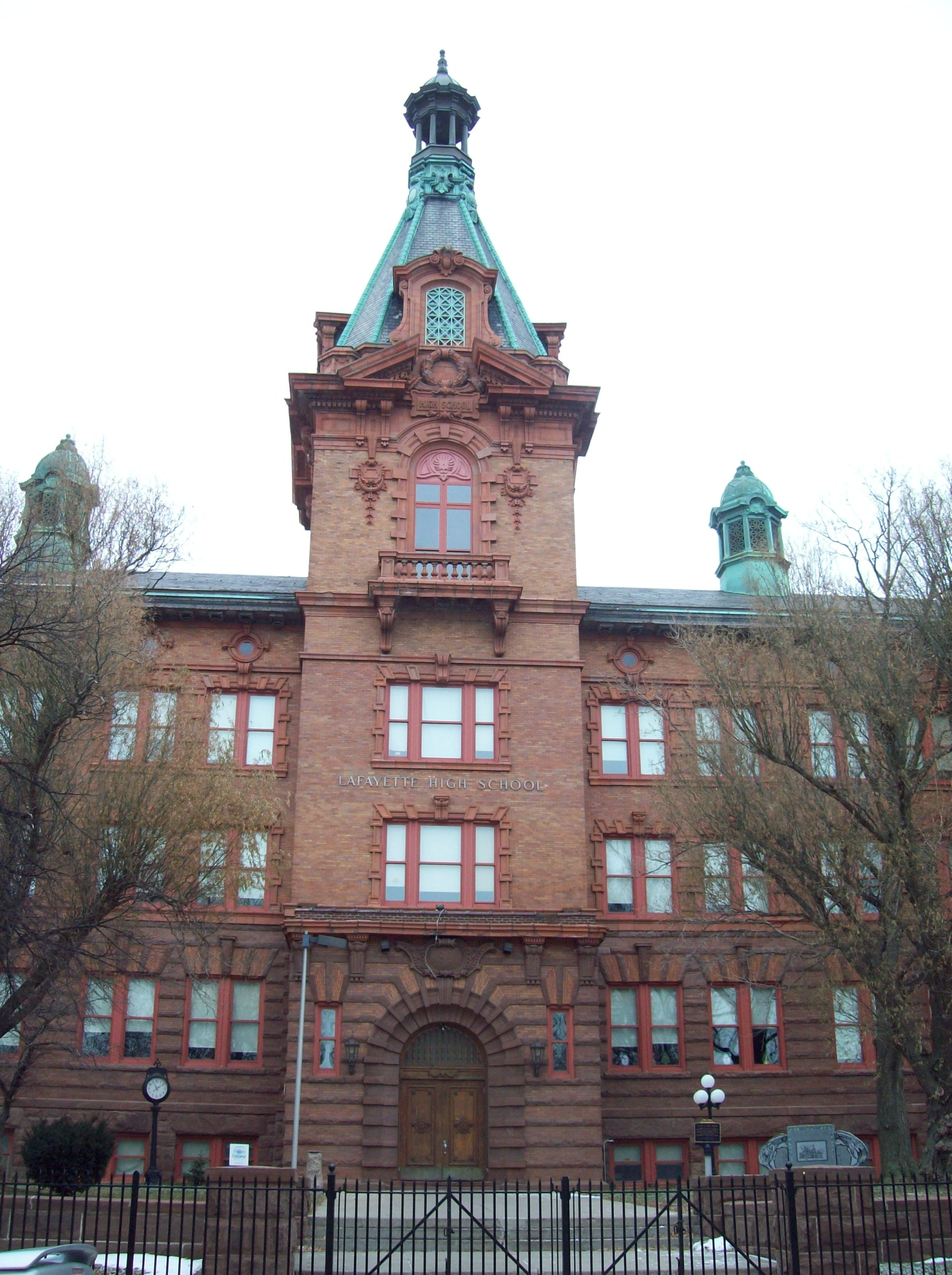
Lafayette High School, Entrance Detail, December 2009
