= Jason McElwain =

European-American Autistic man, known for a high-scoring high school basketball game

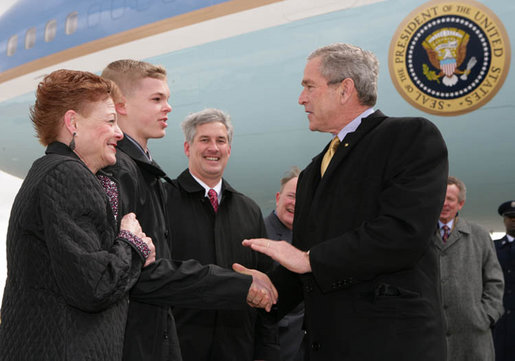
- McElwain, second from left, shakes hands with President George W. Bush in March 2006

Personal information
- Born: October 20, 1988 (age 38) Rochester, New York, U.S.
- Listed height: 6 ft (183 cm)
- Listed weight: 170 lb (77 kg)

Career highlights
- ESPY Award for the Best Moment in Sports

Jason McElwain, nicknamed J-Mac (born October 20, 1988), is a European-American Autistic amateur athlete in basketball, marathon running, and a public speaker. In a 2006 high-school basketball game, he scored 20 points in the final few minutes of the contest, a feat which attracted international media attention.

In 2003, Jason McElwain was appointed as the manager of the Greece Athena High School Trojans men's basketball team by basketball coach Jim Johnson. On February 15, 2006, McElwain played in a senior night basketball game against Spencerport High School, for a division title. Greece Athena got a large lead, so Coach Johnson decided to let McElwain play in the last four minutes and nineteen seconds of the game. McElwain made six three-point shots and one two-pointer, finishing with 20 points. After the final buzzer sounded, the crowd dashed onto the court in celebration. Footage of the event was featured on ESPN days after the game, and a short film about McElwain's life, The Magic Of J-Mac, was released in 2009.

In 2016, McElwain made his professional basketball debut with the Rochester RazorSharks.

== Early life ==
Jason McElwain was born on October 20, 1988, to David and Debbie McElwain, and was diagnosed with autism at two years old. Jason and his family lived in Greece, New York, a suburb of Rochester, New York. He initially struggled when interacting with other children, but began to develop social skills as he grew older. Although he was placed in special education classes, McElwain enjoyed basketball, to which he was introduced by his older brother Josh, and was appointed manager of Greece Athena High School's varsity basketball team. He was given the nickname “J-Mac” after former Syracuse player Gerry McNamara who had the nickname "G-Mac." "

== February 15, 2006, basketball game ==
Greece Athena High School basketball coach Jim Johnson decided to add McElwain to the roster for the team's February 15 game against Spencerport High School, so McElwain could be given a jersey and sit on the bench for the team's last home game of the season, and allow McElwain to play a few minutes if Greece Athena got a comfortable lead. With four minutes left in the game, Greece Athena had a double-digit lead, so Johnson decided to let McElwain play out the last minutes of the game. When teammates first passed the ball to McElwain he attempted a three-point shot and missed. McElwain got a second chance to score with a lay-up which he also missed. McElwain then got "hot as a pistol", sinking six three-pointers and one two-point shot before the game ended. The final score was Greece Athena 79, Spencerport 43. As soon as the final buzzer rang, fans from the stands stormed the court in celebration. Johnson described the celebration at the end of the game as “living the movie Rudy”.

McElwain's performance was videotaped by fellow Greece Athena student Marcus Luciano, who was substituting for the team's normal videographer. Before the game, Johnson gave Luciano strict instructions to track only the game formations. However, according to ESPN writer Elizabeth Merrill, Luciano "had a well-deserved reputation for breaking the rules"; when he saw McElwain make his first shot, he ignored Johnson's instructions and instead panned the crowd reaction to McElwain's performance. Johnson was initially angry, but he soon changed his mind, calling Luciano's decision "a brilliant move".

=== Reaction ===
In his hometown of Greece, New York, McElwain quickly became a celebrity.

But our country was captivated by your amazing story on the basketball court. I think it's a story of Coach Johnson's willingness to give a person a chance. It's a story of Dave and Debbie's deep love for their son, and it's a story of a young man who found his touch on the basketball court, which in turn, touched the hearts of citizens all across the country.
—President George W. Bush
(while talking about McElwain's twenty-point game)

McElwain met President George W. Bush on March 14, 2006, when Bush stopped by a nearby airport on his way to Canandaigua, New York, so he could meet McElwain. Standing next to McElwain, Bush told reporters, "As you can see, a special person has greeted us at the airport, Jason", and then jokingly asked, "Can I call you J-Mac?" Bush went on to praise McElwain, saying "Our country was captivated by an amazing story on the basketball court. It's the story of a young man who found his touch on the basketball court, which, in turn, touched the hearts of citizens all around the country." Bush also stated that upon seeing McElwain on television, he "wept, just like a lot of other people did".

Peyton Manning also visited Rochester, where he was introduced to McElwain. Manning invited McElwain and Steve Kerr, another Greece Athena High School athlete to the Colts' training camp for a week, which McElwain accepted. McElwain threw out the opening pitch for the Rochester Red Wings' game against the Charlotte Knights. He won an ESPY Award for the Best Moment in Sports in 2006. McElwain beat out Kobe Bryant's 81-point-game and the George Mason Patriots' run to the Final Four. The speech that Jason gave upon winning the award was written for him by his older brother. The theme of the speech was about dreams coming true. In addition to the many celebrities McElwain met, he also appeared on various talk shows, including The Oprah Winfrey Show, Larry King Live, Good Morning America and Today.

McElwain appeared on The Talk in April 2011 as part of the show's month-long series on autism awareness. He told the hosts he was head coach of the 17U East Coast Fusion AAU basketball team.

=== Media ===
Following his rise to fame, Jason McElwain wrote a book titled The Game of My Life. The book is written mainly by Jason, but includes sections written by his family, coach, and teammates. The Game of My Life is 243 pages long and was published on February 5, 2008, by New American Library. Editorial reviews were left by celebrities such as Magic Johnson, Doug Flutie, Rodney Peete, Holly Robinson Peete, and Tony Dungy. The book was co-written by Daniel Paisner.

As soon as late February 2006, Jason McElwain and his family started receiving inquiries from over 25 film companies, including The Walt Disney Company and Warner Bros., about making his story into a biopic. In April 2006, Columbia Pictures was reported to have bought the rights to produce the film. Laura Ziskin, producer of the Spider-Man film series, was signed on to produce it. Magic Johnson was attached as producer, while two-time Academy Award winner Alvin Sargent was in talks to write the script.

== Life after high school ==
McElwain completed his GED courses and planned to go to college, and has a full-time job at Wegmans Food Markets in Greece, New York. McElwain also travels across the United States to help raise funds for autism research and to make media appearances. He is also involved in public speaking, including an October 2011 speech at the Jefferson Rehabilitation House's annual dinner. Since 2007, McElwain has also been a volunteer coach for the Greece Athena team alongside Johnson.

In April 2016, the Rochester Razorsharks, a professional minor-league basketball team, signed McElwain to a one-day contract for their regular season finale against the Western New York Thundersnow. With the Razorsharks leading by more than 40 points late in the game, McElwain was put in and scored 10 points, including two three-point shots.

McElwain is also an accomplished runner. On September 23, 2012, McElwain completed the MVP Health Care Rochester Marathon in 15th place in 3 hours, 1 minute, and 41 seconds, a time that qualified him for the Boston Marathon. In 2014, he completed the Boston Marathon in 2:57.05.
