= St. Joseph High School (Brooklyn) =

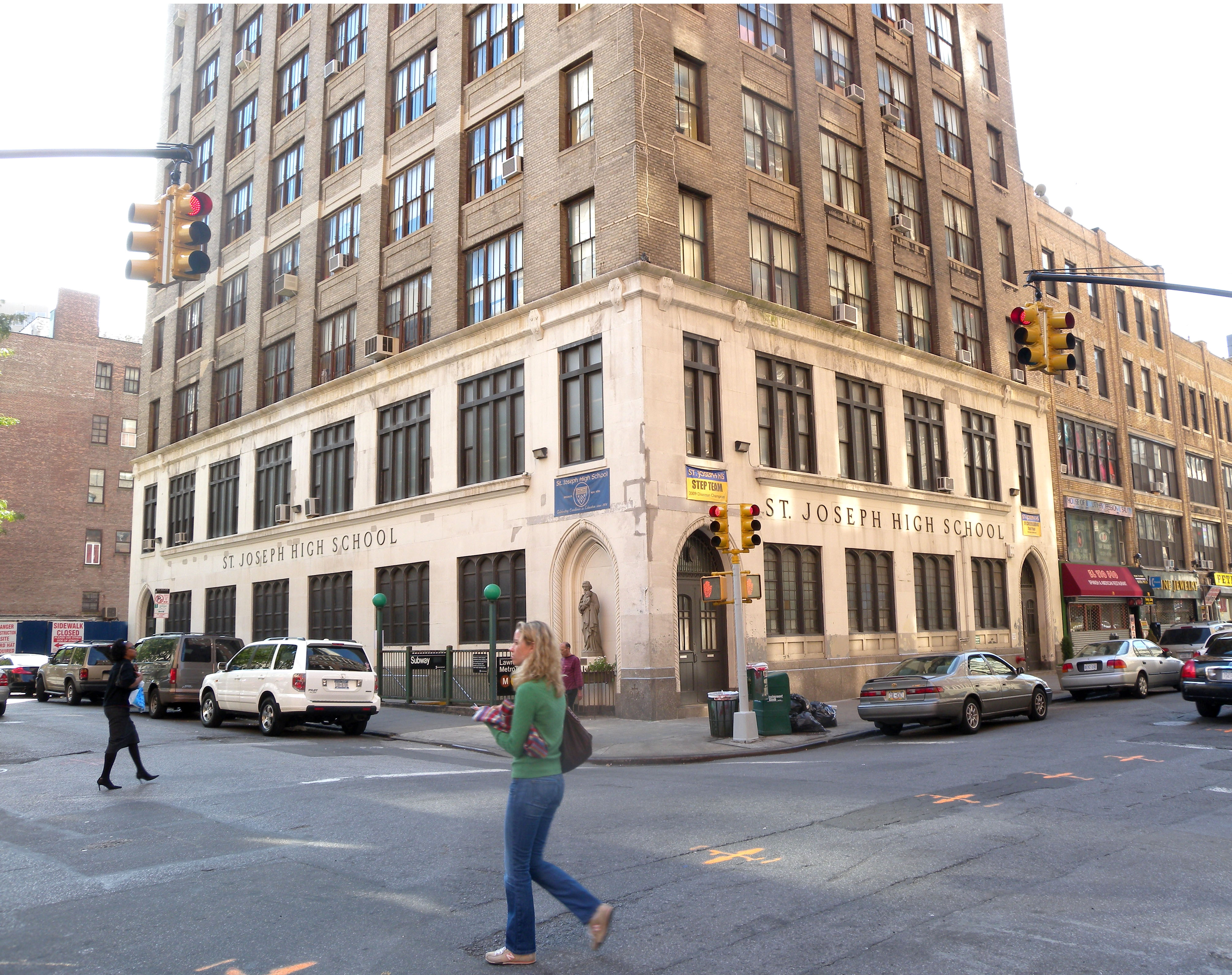

Location
- 80 Willoughby Street; Downtown Brooklyn; New York City (Downtown Brooklyn), New York 11201; United States; 40°41′32.5″N 73°59′8″W

Information
- Type: Private
- Religious affiliation: Roman Catholic
- Patron saint: Saint Joseph
- Established: 1904
- Founder: Sisters of St. Joseph
- Principal: Maysa Antonio
- Faculty: 50
- Grades: 9-12
- Gender: Girls
- Average class size: 21
- Student to teacher ratio: 20:1
- Colors: Blue and Gold
- Song: Alma Mater
- Athletics: JV/V Basketball, Track & Field, STEP, Softball, Speech
- Athletics conference: CHSAA Brooklyn-Queens section
- Sports: Basketball, Softball
- Mascot: Lady Cougars
- Team name: Cougars
- USNWR ranking: 8.5/10
- Newspaper: Parmentier
- Tuition: $6,500
- Alumni: 7000+
- Website: http://www.stjosephhighschool.org

St. Joseph High School was an all-girls Catholic high school in Brooklyn, New York. Established in 1904 by the Sisters of St. Joseph (CSJ) and basing their educational mission on CSJ principles, St. Joseph High School was located within the Diocese of Brooklyn.

== History ==
Established in 1904 in downtown Brooklyn, St. Joseph High School was founded by the Sisters of St. Joseph of Brentwood, New York.

In the beginning, SJHS provided a two-year commercial curriculum to the daughters of immigrants and the working class. In 1936, SJHS became a four-year high school, and in 1965 it adopted a college preparatory curriculum.

In 2019, it was announced that St. Joseph High School would permanently close in June 2020.

== Academic curriculum ==
All students are required to take 4 years of English, Religious Studies, Mathematics and Social Studies, 3 years of Science, and 3 years of Spanish, Physical Education, Dance, Art, or Computer Technology. They may also take electives in Fine Arts, Business, Mathematics, Psychology, Science Research, Journalism and Yearbook.

== Athletics ==
- Basketball A member of the Catholic High School Girls Athletic Association, the Basketball Teams play on the varsity and junior varsity levels. The teams enjoy a partnership with St. Francis College, where they practice and play home games.
- Softball A member of the Catholic High School Girls Athletic Association, the softball team plays on junior varsity level. Home games are played locally at Commodore Barry Park or McLaughlin Park.
- Track & Field A member of the Catholic High School Athletic Association, the Track and Field Team meets twice a week at the Brooklyn Bridge, the Cadman Plaza Park, the school's fitness room, The Brooklyn Promenade and Tillary Park. During the winter, the team meets at the YMCA gym to perfect skills in jogging, power walking, weight training, Zumba fitness and proper daily nutrition. The team competes at the Colgate Games for Women.
- Volleyball Intramural volleyball team practices and plays at St. Francis College.
- Step Team A 10-year tradition at SJHS, stepping is a sport that uses the body as a percussive instrument, creating complex beats through movements including stomping, clapping and shouting. Stepping is rooted in movement and rhythm traditions from African and African Diaspora cultures. The SJHS Step Team won first place in the 2017 CHSAA Championships.
