= Shazzon Bradley =

American football player and boxer

Profile
- Positions: Linebacker; Defensive lineman

Career information
- High school: McMinn County (TN)
- College: Tennessee
- NFL draft: 1992: 9th round, 240th overall pick

Career history
- Green Bay Packers (1992)*
- * Offseason or practice squad member only

Shazzon Bradley is an American former football player and boxer. He played college football at the University of Tennessee.

== Early life ==
Bradley is from Athens, Tennessee. He attended McMinn County High School, where he was an All-American football player for the Cherokees. In addition, he wrestled for the Cherokees. He was a two-time state champion for the Cherokees in the 275 Weight Class for the 1987 and 1988 seasons. He held a school-record in the discus throw for 34 years, until it was broken in 2022. He was named to the school's Hall of Fame in the Class of 2013.

== College football ==
Bradley attended and played college football at the University of Tennessee under head coach Johnny Majors from 1988 to 1991. As a freshman, he earned All-SEC honors. He was a starter for the team at middle linebacker. In the 1989 season, he ranked second on the team with 97 total hits. That year, he recorded an interception against #4 Auburn that thwarted a late comeback attempt by the Tigers. In the 1991 season, he recorded a receiving touchdown on a fake field goal from quarterback Andy Kelly in a 45–0 win over Vanderbilt.

== Professional career ==
Bradley was drafted by the Green Bay Packers in the ninth round of the 1992 NFL draft. He was released as part of the team's final cuts that year.

== Boxing ==
Following his college football career, Bradley went into professional boxing. He was active from 1993 to 1999. He was a heavyweight. He recorded a 21–0 mark before suffering a detached retina and being forced into retirement.

== Personal life ==
Bradley has a criminology degree from the University of Tennessee. He has since worked in security. He was a co-founder of East Tennessee Elite Football Incorporated, a non-profit organization, which helps youth in the Knoxville community and outlying areas.
