= Peekskill Military Academy =

Coordinates: 41°17′14″N 73°55′03″W

Location
- Elm and Hudson Streets; Peekskill, New York; United States

Information
- Type: Military academy
- Opened: 1833
- Status: closed
- Closed: 1968
- Campus size: 55 acres (22 ha)

Peekskill Military Academy was a military academy for young men and women, founded in 1833 as Peekskill Academy, located in Peekskill, New York, United States.

== Background ==
The academy was built by a hanging tree where a British spy was executed in 1777; his bones were discovered and relocated during construction of a dormitory in the 1860s. In 1841 the academy decided to only admit boys. By 1857 it was known as Peekskill Military Academy. The school song was titled "The Big House on the Hill". The school motto was "Stand Firm As An Oak. Quit You Like Men." The academy closed in June 1968. The reason identified was a decline in enrollment and lack of endowment. Most buildings from Peekskill Military Academy were razed to make room for a new Peekskill High School building. The Ford Administration Building is the last significant structure remaining from the academy and it was added to the National Register of Historic Places in 2006.

During the 1960s, the New York Jets football team used the Academy and its playing field as a summer training camp. Joe Namath was a Jets team member at the time.

A tan brick road made of Dutch pavers, which used to lead from the steamboat dock to the academy and of which only one section remains as part of a parking lot, is known by city historian John Curran, and agreed upon by many others, to be the inspiration for the Yellow Brick Road in alumnus L. Frank Baum's Oz books including the Wizard of Oz.

== Luminaries ==
Notable alumni include actor Lee Marvin, actor Guy Williams, banker Sandy Weill, writers L. Frank Baum and Paul West, politician Chauncey Depew, civil liberties advocate Narciso J. Alegre, musician and founding member of the legendary punk rock band Ramones Johnny Ramone, and Olympic swimmers Carl Robie and Stephen Rerych.

A former Peekskill commandant, Colonel Charles Jefferson (C.J.) Wright, founded New York Military Academy in 1889, and a former faculty member, Roland R. Robinson, founded Eastern Military Academy (1944–1979).
