= Sherburne High School =

- U.S. National Register of Historic Places
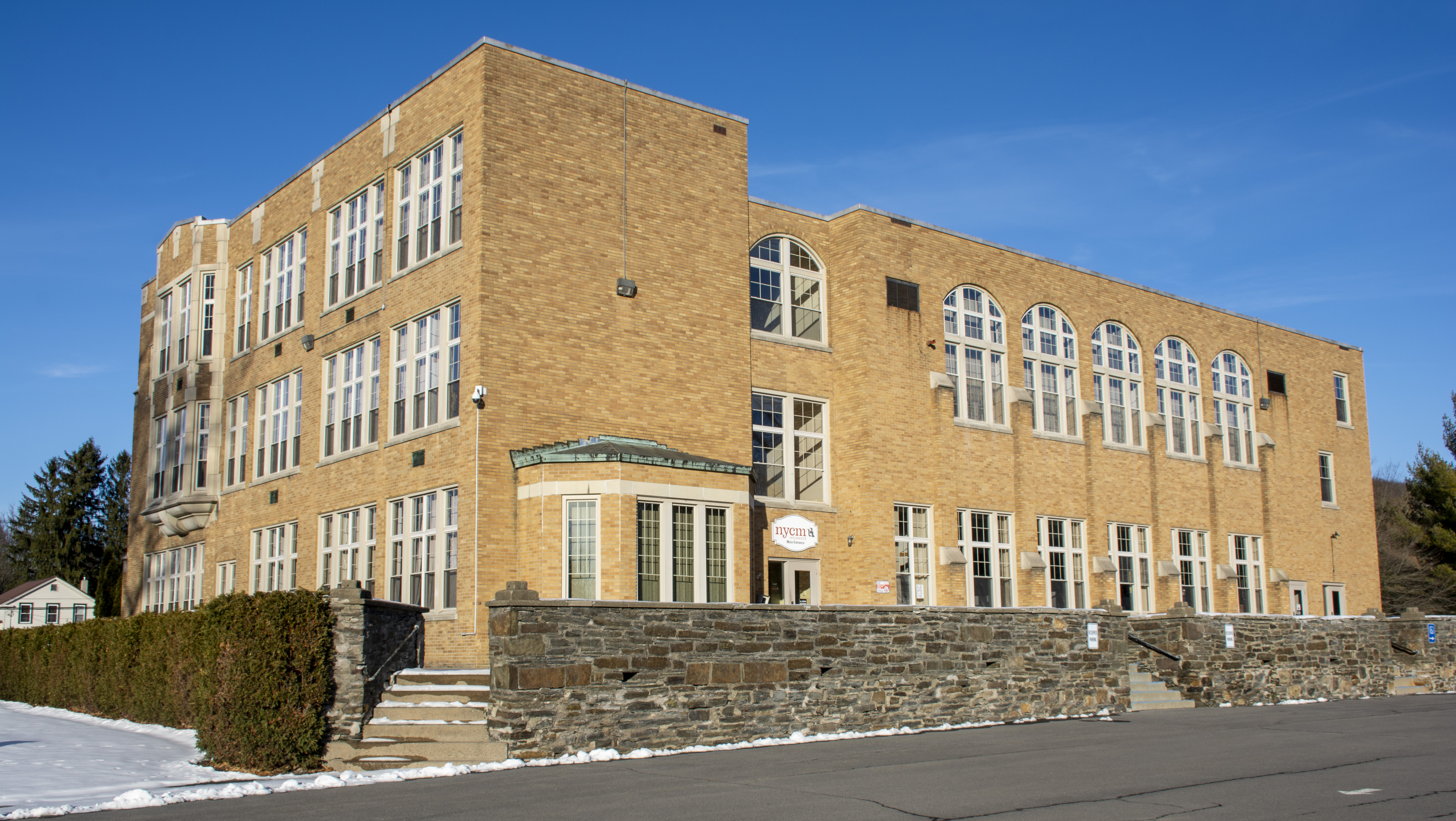

- Location within New York Location within the United States
- Location: 16 Chapel St., Sherburne, New York
- Coordinates: 42°40′33″N 75°29′39″W
- Area: 5.5 acres (2.2 ha)
- Built: 1924
- Architect: Platt, J. Mills; Freeburg, Raymond
- Architectural style: Late Gothic Revival, Collegiate Gothic
- NRHP reference No.: 88002185
- Added to NRHP: November 03, 1988

Sherburne High School is a historic high school located at Sherburne in Chenango County, New York. It was constructed in two phases, 1924–1925, and 1935. The building ceased being used as a school in 1981 after consolidation in the Sherburne-Earlville Central School in 1971 and subsequent use as an intermediate school.

It was added to the National Register of Historic Places in 1988.
