= Martin Hochertz =

American football player (1968–2022)

Profile
- Position: Defensive end

Personal information
- Born: October 21, 1968; Chicago, Illinois, U.S.
- Died: March 30, 2022 (aged 53); Charlotte, North Carolina, U.S.
- Listed height: 6 ft 5 in (1.96 m)
- Listed weight: 280 lb (127 kg)

Career information
- College: Southern Illinois
- NFL draft: 1991: undrafted

Career history
- Seattle Seahawks (1991)*; Miami Dolphins (1992)*; Green Bay Packers (1992)*; Atlanta Falcons (1993)*; Washington Redskins (1993-1994); Miami Dolphins (1995)*; Florida Bobcats (1996); New Jersey Red Dogs (1997); Florida Bobcats (1998)
- * Offseason or practice squad member only

Martin Hochertz (October 21, 1968 – March 30, 2022) was an American professional football player who was a defensive end in the Arena Football League for the Florida Bobcats and New Jersey Red Dogs. He played college football at the Southern Illinois University.
