= Cardinal Mooney High School (New York) =

- Greece, New York

Information
- Type: Private, coeducational
- Religious affiliation: Roman Catholic
- Established: 1962; 64 years ago
- Closed: 1989; 37 years ago
- Grades: 9–12

Cardinal Mooney High School was a coeducational Roman Catholic high school in Greece, New York, a suburb of Rochester, New York. Named for Edward Mooney, a bishop of the Diocese of Rochester who later became a cardinal, it was opened in 1962, staffed by the Brothers of Holy Cross and the Sisters of Mercy.

In 1989, with enrollment declining and other financial difficulties, the Brothers and the diocese decided to close the school at the end of the 1988–89 school year. The school building and property were sold to the Greece Central School District, and was reopened in 1990 as Apollo Middle School. Apollo Middle School closed in 2014. The school was reopened under the name Odyssey Academy.
