= Lafayette International High School =

Location
- 370 Lafayette Ave; Buffalo, New York 14213; United States
- 42°55′13″N 78°53′3″W

Information
- Type: Public
- Established: 2016
- School district: Buffalo Public Schools
- School number: 207
- NCES School ID: 360585006593
- Principal: John C. Starkey
- Teaching staff: 62.01 (on an FTE basis)
- Grades: 9-12
- Enrollment: 475 (2024-2025)
- Student to teacher ratio: 7.66
- Campus: City: Large
- Colors: Purple and White
- Slogan: "Where the World Comes to Learn"
- Mascot: Violets
- Yearbook: The Oracle
- Website: www.buffaloschools.org/o/ps207

Lafayette International Community High School is a high school located in the West Side of Buffalo, New York. It serves students in Grades 9 through 12. The current principal is John Starkey.

== History ==
Lafayette International High School opened in 2016, replacing Lafayette High School, which was phased out due to persistently low academic performance, closing in June 2018.

== Academics ==
Lafayette International Community High School offers educational programs geared towards refugee and immigrant students who have arrived in the United States within the past four years. The curriculum is based on project-based learning with a focus on accommodations and career programs for English language learners. The building serves as a community school for the greater West Side, offering community and family educational programs after school hours and on selected weekends.
