= All City High =

Coordinates: 43°11′41″N 77°38′3″W

- Rochester, New York

Information
- Enrollment: 1,000+
- Colors: Black and White
- Athletics: Basketball, Baseball, Softball, Football, Wrestling, Tennis
- Website: http://www.rcsdk12.org/allcityhs

All City High is located at 1305 Lyell Avenue in Rochester, New York.

All City High is a semester based program that offers students in grades 10-12, between the ages of 17-21 years old an opportunity to get caught up on high school credits and in some cases accelerate graduation. Students are able to learn in a supportive educational environment with teachers and staff that are empathetic to students individual needs.

== Demographics ==
- American Indian or Alaska Native: 6%
- White: 9%
- Black or African American: 59%
- Asian: 2%
- Native Hawaiian / Other Pac Islander: 1%
- Unclassified: 23%

All City High's free/reduced lunch rate is 100% of the students.

== Admittance ==
To be considered for a seat at All City High, a student must be currently enrolled in a Rochester City School District (RCSD) high school.

The All City High intake process determines whether the program is a good fit for a student's needs and graduation goals. Because admission criteria vary for each candidate, the team reviews the student's transcript, credits, Regents exam requirements, attendance, and school history.

Upon receiving an enrollment inquiry, the team reviews the candidate's file. If the student is a good fit and the program can accommodate their required schedule, they are contacted for an intake meeting to discuss program expectations, available supports, and their path to graduation. Following the meeting, the student and their family are informed of the placement decision and next steps.

Interested students are encouraged to speak with their current counselor or administrator to determine if they are a good candidate for the program.

== Facilities ==
All City High provides a welcoming learning environment with classroom and office spaces that support daily instruction, student services, and individualized assistance. It is located at 1305 Lyell Avenue, Rochester, new York, 14606, the former Theodore roosevelt School No. 43 building. The facility includes classrooms, a gymnasium with a stage, and a cafeteria, providing spaces for academic instruction, physical education, student meals, and school gatherings.

== Extra-curricular ==
Students attending All City High maintain dual-enrollment status with their home school, retaining full eligibility to participate in extracurricular programs and interscholastic sports.

== See also ==
- Rochester City School District
