= Odyssey Academy =

Location
- 750 Maiden Ln; Greece, New York 14615; United States; 43.22537°N 77.66288°W

Information
- Type: Public
- School district: Greece Central School District
- NCES School ID: 361263001035
- Principal: Corey Hepburn
- Teaching staff: 91.92 (on an FTE basis)
- Grades: 6-12
- Enrollment: 943 (2021-2022)
- Student to teacher ratio: 10.26
- Campus: Suburban
- Colors: Purple, Black and White
- Mascot: Leopards (originally Snow Leopards)
- Website: www.greececsd.org/o/oa

Odyssey Academy is a middle/high school in the town of Greece, New York. It is part of the Greece Central School District. Odyssey Academy serves over 1,000 students, partially selected by a random lottery from applicants across Greece, serving grades 6-12.

During the summer of 2012, Odyssey Academy moved from 133 Hoover Drive to the former Apollo Middle School location at 750 Maiden Lane. 133 Hoover Drive was the location for Hoover Drive Middle School before becoming Greece Odyssey in 1993. In 2004, it became Odyssey Academy and is one of the oldest school buildings in Greece, having been built in 1928 as a K-8 school known as Willis N. Britton School, the same time Paddy Hill's formed Greece Consolidated School District #5 School, and when the Dewey Stone area Union Free School District 15 was known as Barnard. It was not until the 1961 school year when it became a junior high school for students in grades 7-9 and the elementary grades were divided up and sent to other district schools in Greece Central School District.

== History ==
On July 9, 1928, voters approved the acceptance of the donation of five acres of land in the Koda-Vista tract, from Willis N. Britton. The first members of the school board in 1929 were John Easton, Norman Weeks, Adelbert Lanctot, Arthur Kerkel, and Arthur Koerner. Norley Pearson was the district clerk. John Tallinger acted as treasurer and Lanctot was president. Willis N. Britton School officially opened in 1929 at a cost of $200,000, but they decided to take on the third floor of the building at the time, so instead of building two stories at $200,000, they raised an additional $25,000 for a total of $225,000, and the original gross square foot of Willis N. Britton School was 40,326 square feet and 18 classrooms. In 1948, Willis N. Britton School had its first expansion to the building and expanded the gross square footage by 29,134 square feet and additional 14 classrooms. In 1952, another expansion was added to the school building, adding another 10 classrooms and 18,273 square feet to the building. A gymnasium was added to the school building in 1957. In 1961/1962, a home economics wing and technology room was added to the school, adding an additional 26,845 square feet to the building. A music wing was added to the school in 2004. The school once served as a public library in the mid-1930s because Greece did not have its own library building at the time until 1950. Odyssey Academy moved to its current location on 750 Maiden Lane in 2012.

There is a memorial boulder located behind the softball field on the southeast end of the property at 133 Hoover Drive as a dedication to Miss Francis Howell, a physical education teacher who was killed in an automobile accident when she fell asleep at the wheel on the way home from a vacation in the hills of Pennsylvania. The memorial was placed there in 1953.

On September 7, 1989, students were not able to attend the first day of school due to a chemical spill at the neighboring Latona Road Complex for the Kodak company.

From 1993 until 2000, the school colors for Odyssey Academy were purple, teal and white

== Past principals ==
- 2nd Principal - Milton V Pullen
- 7th Principal - Eugene Bowers
- 8th Principal - Daniel Doran
- 9th Principal - Ronald Nigro
- 10th Principal - Susan Meier
- Current Principal - Corey Hepburn

== National recognition ==
- In 2006, Odyssey Academy was declared one of the Intel Schools of Distinction for "Leadership Excellence."
- In 2007, the school was determined 109th best American public school on a list of 1,300 by Newsweek.
- In 2008, Odyssey was listed 108th in the Newsweek Challenge Index of top public high schools in America. The index rates schools based on the number of students who take Advanced Placement and International Baccalaureate examinations relative to the size of the school.
- In 2012, Odyssey was listed 75th in the Newsweek Challenge Index of top public high schools in America. Odyssey was also ranked 12th best in New York.

== Musical productions ==
Odyssey Academy's past musical productions, dating back to 1994, have included Broadway Revue, Ransom of Red Chief, Wizard of Oz, Bye Bye Birdie, Oklahoma!, Fiddler on the Roof, Camelot, The Music Man, Kiss Me, Kate, Big: the musical, The Adventures of Tom Sawyer, Seussical, The Wiz, Annie Get Your Gun, Once on This Island, Footloose, Rags, Cinderella, The Wedding Singer, South Pacific, Honk!, Grease, The Sound of Music, Barnum, Big Fish, Freaky Friday, The Addams Family, Fame, Little House on the Prairie, Into the Woods, The Little Mermaid, and Seussical. Productions which have earned the school many awards and nominations from the Rochester Broadway Theatre League's Stars of Tomorrow competition.
