= 2022 TBL season =

- League: TBL
- Sport: Basketball
- Season MVP: Deshawn Munson (Potawatomi Fire)
- Finals champions: Shreveport Mavericks
- Runners-up: Albany Patroons

TBL seasons
- ← 2021 2023 →

The 2022 TBL season is the fifth season of The Basketball League (TBL). The league expanded from 29 teams in the 2021 season to 44. For the 2022 season, the National Basketball League of Canada (NBLC) announced that they had agreed to inter-league series play with several teams from The Basketball League. The games played between the teams from the two leagues are included in their respective regular season standings for each league.

== League changes ==
On September 27, the Albany Patroons rejoined the league after opting out of the 2021 season. The 2021 teams that withdrew due to the ongoing COVID-19 pandemic: the Salem Capitals (formerly the San Diego Waves from the 2019 season), Temecula Eagles, and Vancouver Volcanoes (previously announced as the Portland Storm), returned from hiatus.

On June 4, 2021, the Beaumont Panthers, led by retired basketball player Kendrick Perkins and his cousin, Jay McDonald, were added as an expansion team for the 2022 season. On October 4, the Citizen Potawatomi Nation, near Shawnee, Oklahoma, announced a basketball team named the Potawatomi Fire would join the league. By the start of the season, the league had also added the Atlantic City Gambits, Bakersfield Magic, Central Alabama Jaguars, Cincinnati Warriors, Connecticut Cobras, Indiana All-Americans, Kentucky Enforcers, Lansing Pharaohs, Lebanon Leprechauns, Lehigh Valley Legends, Medora Timberjacks, Pennsylvania Kings, Reading Rebels, Rockwall 7ers, SoCal Moguls, Sugarland Imperials, Tallahassee Southern Kings, and Toledo Glass City B.C.

The league also lost ten teams from the 2021 season: Atlanta Empire, Columbus Condors, Houston Push, Indy Express, Lewisville Leopards, Midtown Prestige, Omaha's Finest, San Diego Guardians, Vegas Ballers, and West Coast Breeze. The Atlanta Empire claim to be returning 2023.

The Avon Aces, which had been announced as 2021 expansion team before withdrawing due to the pandemic, was not mentioned as returning. The Arizona HEET and Topeka Wizards were also announced as expansion teams, but were removed during the 2021 offseason.

== Standings ==
Final standings:

x – qualified for playoffs; z – Conference champion

=== Central Conference ===
==== Central ====
Team	GP	W	L	PCT
z Enid Outlaws	24	20	4	.833
x Shreveport Mavericks	24	19	5	.792
x Potawatomi Fire	24	18	6	.750
xDallas Skyline	24	18	6	.750
x Sugarland Imperials	24	11	13	.458
x Rockwell 7ers	24	8	16	.333
Beaumont Panthers	24	8	16	.333
Little Rock Lightning	24	3	21	.125
Waco Royals	24	1	23	.042

=== Eastern Conference ===
==== Northeast ====
Team	GP	W	L	PCT
z Albany Patroons	23	20	3	.870
x Atlantic City Gambits	24	18	6	.750
x Syracuse Stallions	23	17	6	.739
Reading Rebels	24	12	12	.500
Lancaster Kings	22	11	11	.500
Lehigh Valley Legends	24	11	13	.458
Tri-State Admirals	24	10	14	.417
Connecticut Cobras	23	5	18	.217
Massachusetts Monarchs	21	0	21	.000

==== Southeast ====
Team	GP	W	L	PCT
Central Alabama Jaguars	22	15	7	.682
x Huntsville Hurricanes	23	13	10	.565
x Tallahassee Southern Kings	22	12	10	.545
x Tampa Bay Titans	24	13	11	.542
Raleigh Firebirds	24	12	12	.500
Carolina Coyotes	23	13	11	.542
Gulf Coast Lions	20	5	19	.208

=== Midwest Conference ===
==== Lower Midwest ====
Team	GP	W	L	PCT
zOwensboro Thoroughbreds	24	17	7	.708
x Lebanon Leprechauns	24	16	8	.667
x Kokomo BobKats	23	12	11	.522
Indiana All-Americans	24	12	12	.545
Kentucky Enforcers	23	11	12	.478
Medora Timberjacks	24	8	16	.333

==== Upper Midwest ====
Team	GP	W	L	PCT
z Jamestown Jackals	24	19	5	.792
xToledo Glass City B.C	24	16	8	.667
x Lansing Pharoahs	24	15	9	.625
Flint United	24	12	12	.500
Detroit Hustle	24	6	18	.250
Dayton Flight	24	6	18	.250
Cincinnati Warriors	24	6	19	.240

=== Western Conference ===
==== West ====
Team	GP	W	L	PCT
z California Sea-Kings	24	20	4	.833
x SoCal Moguls	24	16	8	.667
x Salem Capitals	24	17	7	.708
x Vancouver Volcanoes	24	7	17	.292
x San Diego Sharks	24	6	18	.250
x Bakersfield Magic	24	6	18	.250

== Playoffs ==
Round of 32
Dallas Skyline	2
Sugarland Impearials	0
Potawatomi Fire	2
Rockwell 7ers	0
Salem Capitals	2
Vancouver Volcanoes	0
San Diego Sharks	2
Bakersfield Magic	0
Atlantic City Gambits	2
Syracuse Stallions	0
Tallahassee Southern Kings	2
Tampa Bay Titans	0
Lansing Pharaohs	0
Toledo Glass City B.C	2
Lebanon Leprechauns	1
Kokomo BobKats	2

Round of 16
Enid Outlaws	2
Dallas Skyline	0
Shreveport Mavericks	2
Potawatomi Fire	1
California Sea-Kings	2
Salem Capitals	0
SoCal Moguls	2
San Diego Sharks	0
Albany Patroons	2
Atlantic City Gambits	1
Huntsville Hurricanes	2
Tallahassee Southern Kings	0
Jamestown Jackals	0
Toledo Glass City B.C	2
Owensboro Thoroughbreds	0
Kokomo BobKats	2

Quarterfinals
Enid Outlaws	1
Shreveport Mavericks	2
California Sea-Kings	1
SoCal Moguls	2
Albany Patroons	2
Huntsville Hurricanes	0
Toledo Glass City B.C	0
Kokomo BobKats	2

Semifinals
Shreveport Mavericks	2
SoCal Moguls	0
Albany Patroons	2
Kokomo BobKats	1

Finals
Shreveport Mavericks	2
Albany Patroons	1
