= 2021 TBL season =

- League: TBL
- Sport: Basketball

Regular season

Playoffs
- Finals champions: Enid Outlaws
- Runners-up: Syracuse Stallions

TBL seasons
- ← 2020 2022 →

The 2021 TBL season is the fourth season of The Basketball League (TBL). The season began in April and the teams are each scheduled to play 24 games.

The league announced several new teams for the 2021 season, expanding from 12 teams in the COVID-19 pandemic curtailed 2020 season to 36 teams as of December 30, 2020. Several of the added teams came from the semi-professional American Basketball Association such as the California Sea-Kings, San Diego Guardians, and Syracuse Stallions. The expansions included a new Shreveport Mavericks, as well as the Atlanta Empire, Charleston/Carolina Coyotes, Detroit Hustle, Enid Outlaws, Flint United, Houston Push, Kokomo BobKats, Little Rock Lightning, Midtown Prestige, Omaha's Finest, South Shore Monarchs, Vegas Ballers, Waco Royals, and West Coast Breeze.

In addition, this season marked the first time two female head coaches led professional men's basketball teams: Angela Weathers of the Dallas Skyline and Daria Carrington of the West Coast Breeze.

Due to difficult business conditions of certain markets and availability of venues due to the ongoing pandemic, the existing Albany Patroons, and the announced expansion teams the Avon Aces, Fresno Fire, Portland Storm, Salem Capitals, and Temecula Eagles opted not to play this season. As of April 2021, all but the Fresno Fire are still listed as returning in 2022.

== Standings ==
Final standings:

x – qualified for playoffs; z – Conference champion

=== Central Conference ===
Team	GP	W	L	PCT
z Enid Outlaws	24	22	2	.917
x Houston Push	24	22	2	.917
x Shreveport Mavericks	24	17	7	.708
x Omaha's Finest	24	12	12	.500
Dallas Skyline	24	11	13	.458
Lewisville Leopards	24	8	16	.333
Little Rock Lightning	24	7	17	.292
Waco Royals	24	5	19	.208
Midtown Prestige	24	4	20	.167

=== East Conference ===
Team	GP	W	L	PCT
z Syracuse Stallions	24	20	4	.833
x Jamestown Jackals	22	16	6	.727
x Carolina Coyotes	21	14	7	.667
xRaleigh Firebirds	21	12	9	.571
Atlanta Empire	21	12	9	.600
Tampa Bay Titans	21	9	12	.429
Tri-State Admirals	20	6	14	.300
Gulf Coast Lions	20	5	15	.250
South Shore Monarchs	22	1	20	.048

=== Midwest Conference ===
Team	GP	W	L	PCT
z Kokomo BobKats	24	19	5	.792
x Indy Express	24	16	8	.667
x Owensboro Thoroughbreds	24	16	8	.667
x Dayton Flight	24	10	14	.417
Columbus Condors	23	11	10	.524
Detroit Hustle	23	6	18	.250
Flint United	23	5	18	.217

=== West Conference ===
Team	GP	W	L	PCT
z San Diego Guardians	20	13	7	.650
Vegas Ballers	21	13	8	.619
x California Sea-Kings	20	9	11	.450
West Coast Breeze	21	6	15	.286

== Playoffs ==
Round 1
1	Enid Outlaws	2
4	Omaha's Finest	0
2	Houston Push	2
3	Shreveport Mavericks	0
1	Kokomo Bobkats	2
4	Dayton Flight	0
2	Indy Express	2
3	Owensboro Thoroughbreds	1
1	Syracuse Stallions	2
4	Raleigh Firebirds	0
2	Jamestown Jackals	2
3	Carolina Coyotes	0

Conference Semifinals
1	Enid Outlaws	2
Houston Push	1
San Diego Guardians	2
California Sea Kings	0
Kokomo Bobkats	0
Indy Express	2
Syracuse Stallions	2
Jamestown Jackals	1

Conference Finals
Enid Outlaws	2
San Diego Guardians	0
Indy Express	0
Syracuse Stallions	2

Championship
Enid Outlaws	2
Syracuse Stallions	0

=== TBL Western Conference ===
- San Diego Guardians (1) received bye of first round
- California Sea Kings (2) received bye of first round
