= 2023 TBL season =

- League: TBL
- Sport: Basketball

TBL seasons
- ← 2022 2024 →

The 2023 TBL season is the sixth season of The Basketball League (TBL). The league expanded from 44 teams in the 2022 season to over 50 in 2023. The National Basketball League of Canada once again will partner with The Basketball League in joint league expansion.

== League changes ==
The Connecticut Cobras relocated to Charlotte, North Carolina and became the Charlotte Purple Jackets.

On April 11, 2022, the league announced the return of professional basketball to Seattle.

On June 18, 2022 the National Basketball League of Canada (NBLC) announced that TBL President David Magley, a former NBL Commissioner, will work alongside Audley Stephenson, the current National Basketball League of Canada (NBLC) Commissioner in overseeing the growth of both leagues. Three Canadian basketball teams joined the league: the Newfoundland Rogues, Montreal Tundra, and L'Academie D'Alma.

== Standings ==
=== Northeast ===
Pos	Team	Pld	W	L	PCT	GB
1	(New Jersey) Atlantic City Gambits	24	21	3	.875	—
2	(New York (state)) Albany Patroons	24	20	4	.833	1
3	(Pennsylvania) Reading Rebels	24	17	7	.708	4
4	(New York (state)) Syracuse Stallions	24	16	8	.667	5
5	(Pennsylvania) York Mighty Ants	24	13	11	.542	8
6	(Quebec) Montreal Tundra	25	10	15	.400	11.5
7	(Pennsylvania) Lehigh Valley Legends	24	9	15	.375	12
8	(Quebec) L'Academie D'Alma	23	6	17	.261	14.5
9	Virginia Valley Vipers	24	5	19	.208	16
10	(New Jersey) Tri-State Admirals	24	3	21	.125	18

Updated to match(es) played on 31 December 2023. Source:

=== Southeast ===
Pos	Team	Pld	W	L	PCT	GB
1	(Georgia (U.S. state)) Georgia Soul	23	18	5	.783	—
2	(North Carolina) Raleigh Firebirds	24	18	6	.750	0.5
3	(Newfoundland and Labrador) Newfoundland Rogues	40	23	17	.575	3.5
4	(Georgia (U.S. state)) Coastal Georgia Buccaneers	24	12	12	.500	6.5
5	(North Carolina) Fayetteville Stingers	25	12	13	.480	7
6	(Florida) Gulf Coast Lions	21	10	11	.476	7
7	(North Carolina) Charlotte Purple Jackets	19	5	14	.263	11
8	Central Florida Force	20	3	17	.150	13.5

Updated to match(es) played on 31 December 2023. Source:

=== Central Conference ===
==== Central ====
Pos	Team	Pld	W	L	PCT	GB
1	(Oklahoma) Potawatomi Fire	24	21	3	.875	—
2	(Louisiana) Shreveport Mavericks	24	20	4	.833	1
3	(Kansas) Wichita Sky Kings	26	19	7	.731	3
4	(Oklahoma) Enid Outlaws	24	13	11	.542	8
5	(Arkansas) Little Rock Lightning	22	8	14	.364	12
6	(Texas) Rockwall 76ers	25	6	19	.240	15.5
7	Oklahoma Panthers	22	5	17	.227	15
8	Pearland Texas Warriors	22	4	18	.182	16

Updated to match(es) played on 31 December 2023. Source:

=== Lower Midwest Conference ===
Pos	Team	Pld	W	L	PCT	GB
1	(Indiana) Medora Timberjacks	24	17	7	.708	—
2	(Missouri) St. Louis Griffins	24	16	8	.667	1
3	(Alabama) Huntsville Hurricanes	24	14	10	.583	3
4	(Kentucky) Owensboro Thoroughbreds	24	13	11	.542	4
5	(Ohio) Cincinnati Warriors	24	12	12	.500	5
6	(Kentucky) Derby City Distillers	26	9	17	.346	9
7	Kentucky Enforcers	24	3	21	.125	14

Updated to match(es) played on 31 December 2023. Source:

=== Upper Midwest Conference ===
Pos	Team	Pld	W	L	PCT	GB
1	(Indiana) Kokomo BobKats	30	21	9	.700	—
2	(Ohio) Glass City Wranglers	26	17	9	.654	2
3	West Virginia Grind	25	15	10	.600	3.5
4	(New York (state)) Jamestown Jackals	24	11	13	.458	7
5	(Michigan) Kalamazoo Galaxy	25	9	16	.360	9.5
6	(Indiana) Lebanon Leprechauns	26	7	19	.269	12
7	(Michigan) Flint United	25	4	21	.160	14.5

Updated to match(es) played on 31 December 2023. Source:

=== West Conference ===
Pos	Team	Pld	W	L	PCT	GB
1	(Washington (state)) Seattle Super Hawks	26	22	4	.846	—
2	(California) Long Beach Blue Waves	24	17	7	.708	4
3	(Oregon) Salem Capitals	25	15	10	.600	6.5
4	(California) San Diego Sharks	24	12	12	.500	9
5	(California) South Bay Flash	24	12	12	.500	9
6	(California) Bakersfield Majestics	25	12	13	.480	9.5
7	(Washington (state)) Vancouver Volcanoes	23	8	15	.348	12.5
8	(Washington (state)) Wenatchee Bighorns	24	8	16	.333	13
9	(California) West Coast Breeze	22	1	21	.045	19

Updated to match(es) played on 31 December 2023. Source:

== Playoffs ==
Round of 16
Seattle Super Hawks	2
Salem Capitals	1
West
Long Beach Blue Waves	2
South Bay Flash	1
Potawatomi Fire	2
Enid Outlaws	0
Central
Wichita Sky Kings	0
Shreveport Mavericks	2
Atlantic City Gambits	0
Albany Patroons	2
East
Georgia Soul	0
Newfoundland Rogues	2
Kokomo Bobkats	2
Glass City Wranglers	0
Midwest
Medora Timberjacks	0
St. Louis Griffins	2

Quarter-finals
Seattle Super Hawks	2
Long Beach Blue Waves	0
Potawatomi Fire	2
Shreveport Mavericks	0
Albany Patroons	2
Newfoundland Rogues	0
Kokomo Bobkats	1
St. Louis Griffins	2

Semi-finals
Seattle Super Hawks	0
Potawatomi Fire	2
Albany Patroons	1
St. Louis Griffins	2

Final
Potawatomi Fire	2
St. Louis Griffins	1
