= 2020 TBL season =

- League: TBL
- Sport: Basketball

Regular season
- Top seed: Indy Express
- Season MVP: Corey Taite

TBL seasons
- ← 2019 2021 →

The 2020 TBL season is the third season of The Basketball League (TBL). In March 18, amid the COVID-19 pandemic, the season was cancelled without completion.

== League changes ==
=== Organization ===
On June 29, 2019, league CEO Evelyn Magley announced Kayla Crosby as the director of team development for approving new teams. Crosby is the owner and founder of the Jamestown Jackals.

=== Teams ===
It was announced that the Albany Patroons had been sold to new ownership. The Yakima SunKings were not included as 2020 member and the Mesquite Desert Dogs withdrew due to the travel constraints as the only remaining west coast team.

The league also added the Columbus Condors, Dayton Flight, Dallas Skyline, Gulf Coast Lions, Indy Express, Lewisville Yellow Jackets, and the Tri-State Admirals as expansion teams. The TBL added the Gulf Coast Lions, based in the Bradenton/Sarasota area, as the league's seventh new team for the 2020 season. The San Diego Waves were replaced by expansion San Diego Armada while the Waves were being relocated, but neither team would make the 2020 schedule.

== Standings ==
Final standings:

Team	W	L	PCT
Indy Express	9	2	.818
Jamestown Jackals	8	3	.727
Tri-State Admirals	7	3	.700
Dallas Skyline	9	4	.692
Albany Patroons	6	3	.667
Columbus Condors	6	3	.667
Gulf Coast Lions	4	4	.500
Owensboro Thoroughbreds	6	7	.462
Tampa Bay Titans	4	7	.364
Raleigh Firebirds	2	8	.200
Lewisville Yellow Jackets	1	9	.100
Dayton Flight	1	10	.091

== Awards ==
All-TBL Awards 2020:

Player of the Year: Corey Taite (Tri-State Admirals)
Guard of the Year: Corey Taite (Tri-State Admirals)
Forward of the Year: Ricardo Artis III (Dallas Skyline)
Center of the Year: Terry Maston (Dallas Skyline)

=== All-League 1st Team ===
PG: Corey Taite (Tri-State Admirals)
PG: Daylon Guy (Dallas Skyline)
SG: Bassel Harfouch (Tampa Bay Titans)
F: Ricardo Artis III (Dallas Skyline)
F/C: Terry Maston (Dallas Skyline)

=== All-League 2nd Team ===
G: Shadell Millinghaus (Albany Patroons)
G: Joe Retic (Indy Express)
G: Andy Bosley (Columbus Condors)
G/F: Robert Vaden (Indy Express)
F/C: Anthony-Moe (Albany Patroons)

=== All-League 3rd Team ===
PG: Taishaun Johnson (Dayton Flight)
PG: Micheal Lenoir (Lewisville Yellow Jackets)
G/F: Davon Hayes (Owensboro Thoroughbreds)
F: Balsa Bazovic (Lewisville Yellow Jackets)
F: James Currington (Tri-State Admirals)

== Draft ==
The 2020 player draft for the league was held on December 8, 2019. The first overall TBL selection Rahim Williams was taken by Gulf Coast Lions.

Although some of the players chosen in the draft had played semi-professional or professional basketball after college graduation, only the United States colleges they attended are listed.

Pos.	G	F	C
Position	Guard	Forward	Center

Round	Pick	Player	Position	Nationality	Team	College	Year graduated
1	1	Rahim Williams	G	Canada	Gulf Coast Lions	Shaw University	2018
1	2	Kris Bell	F	United States	Tampa Bay Titans	Fort Valley State University	2017
1	3	Lloyd Burgess	C	United States	Lewisville Yellow Jackets	UNC-Greensboro	2019
1	4	Filip Serwatka	F	United States	Owensboro Thoroughbreds	Fort Wayne	2019
1	5	Chandler Levingston Simon	F	United States	Tri-State Admirals	Valparaiso	2018
1	6	Xavier Keeling	F	United States	Dayton Flight	Indiana	2011
1	7	Tyrone Marshall	C	United States	Jamestown Jackals	CSU-Pueblo	2015
1	8	Jalen Mitchell	SF	United States	Dallas Skyline	Clark Atlanta University	2019
1	9	Zavier Turner	PG	United States	Indy Express	Manhattan College	2018
1	10	Damon Garrett	SG	United States	Raleigh Firebirds	Portland University	2018
1	11	Tevin Farris	F	United States	Columbus Condors	Arkansas Baptist College	2019
1	12	Rob Shaw	PG	United States	Albany Patroons	Chicago State University	2019
2	1	Deverell Biggs	G	United States	Albany Patroons	Texas Southern University	2015
2	2	Derrod Blakey	F	United States	Columbus Condors	Central State University	2015
2	3	Justin Vaughan	G	United States	Raleigh Firebirds	Roberts Wesleyan University	2019
2	4	Davone Daniels	SG	United States	Indy Express	Central State University	2018
2	5	Joshua Keyes	F	United States	Dallas Skyline	Muskingum University	2017
2	6	Larry Bush	G	United States	Jamestown Jackals	University of Hawaiʻi at Hilo	2019
2	7	Brandon Berry	G	United States	Dayton Flight	Lindsey Wilson College	2017
2	8	Corey Taite	PG	United States	Tri-State Admirals	Goldey–Beacom College	2019
2	9	Joel Anderson	G	United States	Owensboro Thoroughbreds	Eastern Oregon University	2019
2	10	Shawn Duhon	F	United States	Lewisville Yellow Jackets	Bluefield State University	2019
2	11	Aluk Adub	F	United States	Tampa Bay Titans	Florida Memorial University	2019
2	12	Jamal Gaines	G	United States	Gulf Coast Lions	Bethune–Cookman University	2019
