= 2024 TBL season =

Basketball league season

- League: TBL
- Sport: Basketball

TBL seasons
- ← 2023 2025 →

The 2024 TBL season is the seventh season of The Basketball League (TBL).

== League changes ==
On August 22, 2023, the league announced an expansion team the Fredrick Flying Cows.

== Standings ==
=== Atlantic Northeast ===
Pos	Team	Pld	W	L	PCT	GB
1	(Maryland) Frederick Flying Cows	24	20	4	.833	—
2	(Pennsylvania) Reading Rebels	24	19	5	.792	1
3	(New York (state)) Albany Patroons	23	17	6	.739	2.5
4	(New York (state)) Jamestown Jackals	23	13	10	.565	6.5
5	Virginia Valley Vipers	23	10	13	.435	9.5
6	Rhode Island Kraken	18	4	14	.222	13
7	Connecticut Crusaders	18	3	15	.167	14
8	(New Jersey) Tri-State Admirals	19	2	17	.105	15.5

Updated to match(es) played on 26 May 2024. Source:

=== Atlantic Southeast ===
Pos	Team	Pld	W	L	PCT	GB
1	(Florida) Jacksonville 95ers	18	14	4	.778	—
2	(North Carolina) Raleigh Firebirds	24	17	7	.708	—
3	(Georgia (U.S. state)) Coastal Georgia Buccaneers	18	5	13	.278	9
4	(Alabama) Rocket City Flight	20	4	16	.200	11

Updated to match(es) played on 26 May 2024. Source:

=== Central ===
Pos	Team	Pld	W	L	PCT	GB
1	(Oklahoma) Potawatomi Fire	20	20	0	1.000	—
2	(Louisiana) Shreveport Mavericks	17	13	4	.765	5.5
3	Texas 7ers	20	9	11	.450	11
4	(Oklahoma) Enid Outlaws	22	9	13	.409	12
5	(New Mexico) Santa Ana Thunder	20	8	12	.400	12
6	(Kansas) Wichita Sky Kings	20	6	14	.300	14
7	(Arkansas) Little Rock Lightning	19	5	14	.263	14.5

Updated to match(es) played on 25 May 2024. Source:

=== Midwest ===
Pos	Team	Pld	W	L	PCT	GB
1	(Missouri) St. Louis Griffins	20	18	2	.900	—
2	(Indiana) Medora Timberjacks	24	19	5	.792	1
3	(Michigan) Pontiac Pharaohs	23	16	7	.696	3.5
4	(Indiana) Kokomo BobKats	24	15	9	.625	5
5	(Kentucky) Derby City Distillers	24	12	12	.500	8
6	(Ohio) Cincinnati Warriors	24	8	16	.333	12
7	(Indiana) Lebanon Leprechauns	24	6	18	.250	14
8	West Virginia Grind	20	5	15	.250	13
9	(Ohio) Glass City Wranglers	22	4	18	.182	15

Updated to match(es) played on 26 May 2024. Source:

=== Pacific Northwest ===
Pos	Team	Pld	W	L	PCT	GB
1	(Washington (state)) Vancouver Volcanoes	20	16	4	.800	—
2	(Washington (state)) Seattle Super Hawks	24	16	8	.667	2
3	(Oregon) Salem Capitals	23	13	10	.565	4.5
4	(Washington (state)) Wenatchee Bighorns	20	10	10	.500	6
5	(Montana) Great Falls Electric	20	10	10	.500	6
6	(Oregon) Emerald City Jaguars	23	0	23	.000	17.5

Updated to match(es) played on 26 May 2024. Source:

=== Pacific Southwest ===
Pos	Team	Pld	W	L	PCT	GB
1	(California) Los Angeles Ignite	20	19	1	.950	—
2	(California) San Diego Sharks	19	11	8	.579	7.5
3	(California) Long Beach Blue Waves	19	8	11	.421	10.5
4	(California) Bakersfield Majestics	20	1	19	.050	18

Updated to match(es) played on 26 May 2024. Source:

== Tournament bracket ==
=== Play Off Play Ins ===
May 27 – Pacific Southwest
Long Beach Waves	1
San Diego Sharks	0

May 28 – Pacific Northwest
Salem Capitals
Seattle SuperHawks	1

May 28 – Midwest Region
Kokomo Bobkats	1
Derby City Distillers

May 28 – Midwest Region
Cincinnati Warriors
Pontiac Pharaohs	1

May 28 – Atlantic Northeast
Albany Patroons	1
Reading Rebels

May 28 – Atlantic Southeast
Jamestown Jackals	0
Raleigh Firebirds	1

== Playoffs ==
Round of 16
Seattle Super Hawks	2
Vancouver Volcanoes	0
West
Long Beach Blue Waves	0
Los Angeles Ignite	2
Potawatomi Fire	2
Wichita Sky Kings	0
Central
Enid Outlaws	1
Texas 7ers	2
Jacksonville 95ers	0
Raleigh Firebirds	2
East
Fredrick Flying Cows	0
Albany Patroons	2
Kokomo Bobkats	1
St. Louis Griffins	2
Midwest
Medora Timberjacks	2
Pontiac Pharaohs	0

Quarter-finals
Seattle Super Hawks	0
Los Angeles Ignite	2
Potawatomi Fire	2
Texas 7ers	0
Raleigh Firebirds	2
Albany Patroons	1
St. Louis Griffins	2
Medora Timberjacks	1

Semi-finals
Los Angeles Ignite	0
Potawatomi Fire	2
Raleigh Firebirds	1
St. Louis Griffins	2

Final
Potawatomi Fire	2
St. Louis Griffins	0
