= 2022 TBL All-Star Game =

Basketball game

The 2022 The Basketball League All-Star Game was held at Liverpool High School on April 16, 2022. Team NBLC was coached by Doug Plumb of the London Lightning, while team TBL was coached by Patrick Beilein of the Syracuse Stallions and Will Brown of the Albany Patroons.

The TBL defeated NLBC, 155–150. Chris Darrington of the Toledo Glass City B.C was named Most Valuable Player of the All-Star Game. Thomas Garrick of the Jamestown Jackals won the Three-Point Contest.

On February 8, 2022, the league announced that the Syracuse Stallions would host an all star game between National Basketball League of Canada and The Basketball League. On April 11, 2022, it was announced that Plumb would coach a team representing the NBL Canada, which would compete against the team from the TBL.

== All-Star teams ==
=== Rosters ===
NBLC All-Stars
Pos.	Player	Team	Appearance
Starters
G	Eric Ferguson	KW Titans	
F	Dexter Williams	Sudbury Five	
F	Jermaine Haley Jr	London Lightning	
SG	Jeremy Harris	Sudbury Five	
G	Zena Edosomwan	Sudbury Five	
Reserves
G	Chris Jones	London Lightning	
F	Jachai Taylor	Windsor Express	
F	Billy White	Windsor Express	
G	Marcus Anderson	Windsor Express	
G	Chad Fraizer	KW Titans	
F	Joel Kindred	KW Titans	
G	Amir Williams	Windsor Express	
Head coach: Doug Plumb (London Lightning)

TBL All-Stars
Pos.	Player	Team	Appearance
Starters
G	Christian Nobles	Syracuse Stallions	
G	A.J. Mosby	Albany Patroons	
G	Jachai Simmons	Atlantic City Gambits	
G	Mason Harrell	Carolina Coyotes	
G	Rodrigues Palmer	Central Alabama Jaguars	
Reserves
G	Deshawn Munson	Potawatomi Fire	
G	Paul Parks	Shreveport Mavericks	
F	Lyle Hexom	Beaumont Panthers	
G	Thomas Garrick	Jamestown Jackals	
F	Montell James	Owensboro Thoroughbreds	
G	Chris Darrington	Toledo Glass City B.C	
G	Ronnie Boyce	Lebanon Leprechauns	
C	Vincient Boumann	Salem Capitals	
G	Greg Foster	California Sea Kings	
Head coach: Patrick Beilein (Syracuse Stallions)
Head coach: Will Brown (Albany Patroons)
