= 2019 TBL season =

- League: TBL
- Sport: Basketball

Regular season
- Top seed: Yakima SunKings
- Season MVP: Robert Duncan (Yakima)

Playoffs
- Finals champions: Albany Patroons
- Runners-up: Yakima SunKings
- Finals MVP: Shadell Millinghaus (Albany)

TBL seasons
- ← 2018 2020 →

The 2019 TBL season is the second season of The Basketball League (TBL) after one season as North American Premier Basketball (NAPB).

After the first NAPB season, league president Dave Magley acquired the league as sole owner, moved the headquarters to Indiana, and named Evelyn Magley as the new CEO. On July 14, the league was rebranded as The Basketball League. On August 16, 2018, Paul Mokeski was named the commissioner of the league after having served the previous season as head coach and general manager of the Nevada Desert Dogs.

During the previous season, four expansion teams were announced for 2019 in the Raleigh Firebirds, San Diego Waves, Tampa Bay Titans, and a Bellevue, Washington-based team. After the league rebrand, the Bellevue team, the Ohio Bootleggers, and the Vancouver Knights were no longer mentioned as members for the 2019 season. The Basketball League also added the Jamestown Jackals from the North American Basketball League and the New York Court Kings from the American Basketball Association. The Nevada Desert Dogs were renamed the Mesquite Desert Dogs and the Kentucky Thoroughbreds were renamed the Owensboro Thoroughbreds. Upon the 2019 season schedule release, the Rochester Razorsharks were also removed from the league.

During the season, there were many canceled and rescheduled games. The league apparently cut its season short with the New York Court Kings and Kansas City Tornadoes either folding or ceasing operations for the season.

== Standings ==
Final standings:

Team	W	L	PCT
Yakima SunKings	22	6	.786
Kansas City Tornadoes	16	8	.667
Mesquite Desert Dogs	15	9	.625
Albany Patroons	16	11	.593
Raleigh Firebirds	15	13	.536
Jamestown Jackals	14	13	.519
San Diego Waves	11	13	.458
Tampa Bay Titans	11	18	.379
Owensboro Thoroughbreds	7	20	.259
New York Court Kings	3	17	.150

== Playoffs ==
There were ten teams in the league with the top four teams qualifying for the playoffs. The second place Kansas City Tornadoes elected not to participate in the playoffs. The semifinals were split in a generalized East and West series despite not having divisions during the regular season. Each round of the playoffs were played as a best-of-three series.

Semifinals (Best-of-3)
W1	Yakima SunKings	2
W2	Mesquite Desert Dogs	0
E1	Albany Patroons	2
E2	Raleigh Firebirds	1

Finals (Best-of-3)
W1	Yakima SunKings	1
E1	Albany Patroons	2

== Draft ==
The 2019 player draft for the league was held on December 3, 2018, and the league's ten teams took turns selecting players who had all competed at the college level in the United States at some point.

Julian Harris of UT Arlington was the first overall TBL selection taken by Raleigh Firebirds.

Although some of the players chosen in the draft had played semi-professional or professional basketball after college graduation, only the United States colleges they attended are listed.

Pos.	G	F	C
Position	Guard	Forward	Center

Round	Pick	Player	Position	Nationality	Team	College	Year graduated
1	1	Julian Harris	F	United States	Raleigh Firebirds	UT Arlington	2018
1	2	Xzavier Taylor	F/C	United States	Jamestown Jackals	Purdue Fort Wayne	2018
1	3	Zack Taylor	F	United States	Tampa Bay Titans	Louisville	2018
1	4	Zerrion Payton	G	United States	San Diego Waves	Westminster College	2017
1	5	Quincy Scates	G	United States	Owensboro Thoroughbreds	Tennessee Wesleyan University	2016
1	6	Jeremy Burright	F	United States	Kansas City Tornadoes	Lower Columbia College	
1	7	Alonzo Murphy	F	United States	Albany Patroons	Lincoln University	2015
1	8	Dushone Brown	F	United States	Mesquite Desert Dogs	Los Angeles Harbor College	
1	9	Richard Townsend-Gant	F	United States	Yakima Sun Kings	Vancouver Island	
1	10	Darnell Foreman	F	United States	New York Court Kings	University of Pennsylvania	2018
2	11	Rahim Williams	G	United States	New York Court Kings	Youngstown State	2018
2	12	Brenton Scott	G	United States	Yakima Sun Kings	Indiana State	2018
2	13	Zach Cassita	G	United States	Mesquite Desert Dogs	North Park University	
2	14	Josh Cameron	G	United States	Albany Patroons	Coastal Carolina University	
2	15	Darien Walker	F	United States	Kansas City Tornadoes	Valparaiso	2016
2	16	Gerald Campbell	G	United States	Owensboro Thoroughbreds	Central State University	
2	17	Spencer Parker	F	United States	San Diego Waves	Bowling Green State University	2017
2	18	Arthur Tally	F	United States	Tampa Bay Titans	Claflin University	
2	19	Charles Foster	G	United States	Jamestown Jackals	Kansas State	2018
2	20	Timothy Plummer	F	United States	Raleigh Firebirds	State College of Florida	
