= List of The Basketball League yearly standings =

These are regular season standings and playoff results for The Basketball League. The league was formed in 2017 as the North American Premier Basketball League (NAPB). In 2018, it was renamed TBL.

== 2018 ==
Team	W	L	PCT	GB
Yakima SunKings	24	8	.742	0
Albany Patroons	19	10	.655	3.5
Ohio Cardinals/Bootleggers (Note: The Cardinals earned a 12–11 record prior to the ownership transfer and is counted towards the Bootleggers' record in the NAPB standings.)	17	11	.607	5.0
Kansas City Tornados	15	15	.500	8.0
Nevada Desert Dogs	14	15	.483	8.5
Kentucky Thoroughbreds	14	19	.424	10.5
Rochester Razorsharks	11	18	.379	11.5
Vancouver Knights	7	25	.219	17.0

== Playoffs ==
There were eight teams in the league with the top four teams seeded one to four for the playoffs. Each round of the playoffs were played a best-of-three series.

Semifinals (Best-of-3)
1	Yakima SunKings	2
4	Kansas City Tornados	1
2	Albany Patroons	2
3	Ohio Bootleggers	1

Finals (Best-of-3)
1	Yakima SunKings	2
2	Albany Patroons	0

== 2019 ==
The 2019 TBL season is the second season of The Basketball League (TBL) after one season as North American Premier Basketball (NAPB).

== Standings ==
Final standings:

Team	W	L	PCT
Yakima SunKings	22	6	.786
Kansas City Tornadoes	16	8	.667
Mesquite Desert Dogs	15	9	.625
Albany Patroons	16	11	.593
Raleigh Firebirds	15	13	.536
Jamestown Jackals	14	13	.519
San Diego Waves	11	13	.458
Tampa Bay Titans	11	18	.379
Owensboro Thoroughbreds	7	20	.259
New York Court Kings	3	17	.150

== Playoffs ==
There were ten teams in the league with the top four teams qualifying for the playoffs. The second place Kansas City Tornadoes elected not to participate in the playoffs. The semifinals were split in a generalized East and West series despite not having divisions during the regular season. Each round of the playoffs were played as a best-of-three series.

Semifinals (Best-of-3)
W1	Yakima SunKings	2
W2	Mesquite Desert Dogs	0
E1	Albany Patroons	2
E2	Raleigh Firebirds	1

Finals (Best-of-3)
W1	Yakima SunKings	1
E1	Albany Patroons	2

== 2020 ==
Prior to the third season, the league added the Columbus Condors, Dayton Flight, Dallas Skyline, Gulf Coast Lions, Indy Express, Lewisville Yellow Jackets, and the Tri-State Admirals as expansion teams. The San Diego Waves were replaced by expansion San Diego Armada while the Waves were being relocated, but neither team would make the 2020 schedule. Due to the lack of other western teams, the Yakima SunKings and the Mesquite Desert Dogs suspended operations. The third season started in January 2020, but on March 11, 2020, the league announced the season would end prematurely due to the COVID-19 pandemic and have a four-team playoff on March 18 through 22. However, the tournament was also cancelled as most events throughout the country were closed to prevent the spread of the virus.

== Standings ==
Final standings:

Team	W	L	PCT
Indy Express	11	9	.550
Jamestown Jackals	11	8	.579
Tri-State Admirals	10	7	.588
Dallas Skyline	13	9	.591
Albany Patroons	9	6	.600
Columbus Condors	9	6	.600
Gulf Coast Lions	8	4	.667
Owensboro Thoroughbreds	13	6	.684
Tampa Bay Titans	11	4	.733
Raleigh Firebirds	10	2	.833
Lewisville Yellow Jackets	10	1	.909
Dayton Flight	11	1	.917

== 2021 ==
The 2021 TBL season is the fourth season of The Basketball League (TBL) after one season as North American Premier Basketball (NAPB).
