= Detroit Hustle =

Professional basketball team

- League: The Basketball League
- Founded: 2020
- History: Detroit Hustle; 2021–present
- Location: Detroit, Michigan
- Team colors
- Head coach: Aaron McDonald
- Ownership: Curtis Leavy

The Detroit Hustle is an American professional basketball team based in Detroit, Michigan and a member of The Basketball League (TBL).

== History ==
On September 23, 2020, Evelyn Magley, CEO of The Basketball League (TBL), announced a new franchise called the Detroit Hustle of Detroit, Michigan, and owned by Curtis Lee for the 2021 season. On November 16, the Detroit Hustle was included in a list for a Midwest region with the Flint United, Anderson Aces, Columbus Condors, Dayton Flight, Indy Express and Kokomo BobKats. On December 18, Kayla Crosby, the director of team development for The Basketball League and owner of the Jamestown Jackals, listed the Hustle in a "pod" that could also feature the Jackals, Albany Patroons, Syracuse Stallions, Dayton Flight, Columbus Condors, and the Flint United.
