= Moochie Norris =

American basketball player (born 1973)

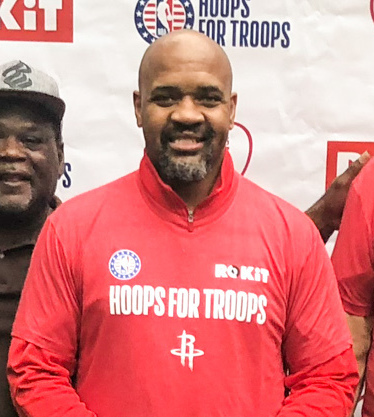
- Norris in 2018

Personal information
- Born: July 27, 1973 (age 53) Washington, D.C., U.S.
- Listed height: 6 ft 1 in (1.85 m)
- Listed weight: 175 lb (79 kg)

Career information
- High school: Cardozo (Washington, D.C.)
- College: Odessa (1992–1994); Auburn (1994–1995); West Florida (1995–1996)
- NBA draft: 1996: 2nd round, 33rd overall pick
- Drafted by: Milwaukee Bucks
- Playing career: 1996–2008
- Position: Point guard
- Number: 10, 6, 12, 25

Career history
- 1996: Florida Beach Dogs
- 1996: Vancouver Grizzlies
- 1996–1997: Fort Wayne Fury
- 1997: Pau-Orthez
- 1997–1998: Fort Wayne Fury
- 1998: Washington Congressionals
- 1998–1999: Fort Wayne Fury
- 1999: Seattle SuperSonics
- 1999–2000: Fort Wayne Fury
- 2000–2003: Houston Rockets
- 2003–2005: New York Knicks
- 2005–2006: Houston Rockets
- 2006: New Orleans/Oklahoma City Hornets
- 2006–2008: Yakima Sun Kings
- 2007: Climamio Bologna

Career highlights
- 2× All-CBA First Team (2000, 2008); All-CBA Second Team (1998); CBA All-Rookie Second Team (1997); CBA assists leader (2008); CBA steals leader (2000)

Career NBA statistics
- Points: 2,272 (5.1 ppg)
- Rebounds: 868 (2.0 rpg)
- Assists: 1,233 (2.8 apg)
- Stats at NBA.com
- Stats at Basketball Reference

Martyn Bernard "Moochie" Norris (born July 27, 1973) is an American former professional basketball player who played several seasons in the National Basketball Association (NBA), as well as other leagues.

== Professional career ==
Norris, a journeyman, played collegiately at Odessa College (junior college) (1992–1994), at Auburn University (1994–1995) and at the University of West Florida (1995–1996). He was drafted with 33rd overall pick (4th in second round) of the 1996 NBA draft by the Milwaukee Bucks. He did not play for the Bucks and on November 22, 1996, was waived by them. On December 12, he signed as a free agent with the Vancouver Grizzlies for whom he played until December, 30, when he was waived. Norris played the remainder of the season with the Fort Wayne Fury of the Continental Basketball Association (CBA) and earned CBA All-Rookie Second Team honors. He returned to the Fury and was named to the All-CBA Second Team in 1998 and the First Team in 2000. Norris played in the NBA from 1999 until the 2005–06 season for the Seattle SuperSonics, Houston Rockets, New York Knicks and New Orleans Hornets.

=== Yakama Sun Kings/ Climamio Bologna (2006–2008) ===
After the 2006 NBA season, Norris was placed on waivers by the New Orleans Hornets.

He joined the Yakama Sun Kings of the Continental Basketball Association briefly in January 2007, played for Italian club Climamio Bologna from March to June of that year.

In November returned to the Sun Kings, where he led the league in assists and earned All-CBA First Team honors.

=== Power/ Ball Hogs (2017–present) ===
In 2017, Moochie Norris was selected by Power with the twentieth overall pick of the 2017 Big3 draft, while later getting traded to the Ball Hogs.

== Coaching career ==
After his basketball career, Norris started giving back to the game of basketball by training and coaching the youth. He helped the basketball coaching staff at Victory Prep Academy in Houston, TX. Currently he can still be found in Houston-area training in which he calls his "Moochie" Norris Workouts at Shoot 360 Basketball in North Houston.

Norris was named head coach of the Houston Push of The Basketball League (TBL).

== Personal life ==
Norris was given his nickname by his grandfather, who loved the Cab Calloway song "Minnie the Moocher".

Early on in his career, Norris dealt with insomnia, which he has suffered from for many years. He was also noticeable for his large afro: Norris became one of the lesser-known NBA players to have his own bobblehead figurine (sporting a synthetic afro) made of him while he was with the Houston Rockets in 2002.
