= 2018 NAPB season =

- League: NAPB
- Sport: Basketball
- Duration: December 31, 2017 – April 28, 2018

Draft
- Top draft pick: Vance Cooksey
- Picked by: Vancouver Knights

Regular season
- Top seed: Yakima SunKings
- Season MVP: Edwin Ubiles (Albany)

Playoffs
- Finals champions: Yakima SunKings
- Runners-up: Albany Patroons
- Finals MVP: Renaldo Major

NAPB seasons
- 2019 →

The 2018 NAPB season was the inaugural season for the North American Premier Basketball. For 2018, the league consists of eight teams: the Albany Patroons, Kansas City Tornados, Kentucky Thoroughbreds, Nevada Desert Dogs, Ohio Cardinals, Rochester Razorsharks, Vancouver Knights, and Yakima SunKings.

The Ohio Cardinals were replaced after 23 games by the Ohio Bootleggers, a semi-professional team in the North American Basketball League that also apparently had taken over operations of the Vancouver Knights sometime during the season. The Knights also had become a travel team at that point and was transferred to a new ownership group that was never identified.

The season ended with the SunKings defeating the Patroons two-games-to-none in the best-of-three finals to win the inaugural NAPB championship.

== Standings ==
Final standings:

Team	W	L	PCT	GB
Yakima SunKings	24	8	.742	0
Albany Patroons	19	10	.655	3.5
Ohio Cardinals/Bootleggers (Note: The Cardinals earned a 12–11 record prior to the ownership transfer and is counted towards the Bootleggers' record in the NAPB standings.)	17	11	.607	5.0
Kansas City Tornados	15	15	.500	8.0
Nevada Desert Dogs	14	15	.483	8.5
Kentucky Thoroughbreds	14	19	.424	10.5
Rochester Razorsharks	11	18	.379	11.5
Vancouver Knights	7	25	.219	17.0

== Season award winners ==
Award	Winner	Team
Most Valuable Player	Edwin Ubiles	Albany Patroons
Rookie of the Year	Xavier Moon	Albany Patroons
Defensive Player of the Year	Renaldo Major	Yakima SunKings
Person of the Year	Jelan Kendrick	Nevada Desert Dogs
Newcomer of the Year	Charlton Jones	Kansas City Tornados
6 Man of the Year	A.J Gaines	Nevada Desert Dogs
Coach of the Year	Paul Woolpert	Yakima SunKings

== Playoffs ==
There were eight teams in the league with the top four teams seeded one to four for the playoffs. Each round of the playoffs were played a best-of-three series.

Semifinals (Best-of-3)
1	Yakima SunKings	2
4	Kansas City Tornados	1
2	Albany Patroons	2
3	Ohio Bootleggers	1

Finals (Best-of-3)
1	Yakima SunKings	2
2	Albany Patroons	0

== Draft ==
The inaugural player draft for the league was held on December 3, 2017, and the league's eight charter teams took turns selecting players who had all competed at the college level in the United States at some point.

Vance Cooksey of Youngstown State University was the first overall NAPB selection taken by Vancouver Knights. Consequently, this makes him the first-ever selection in the history of the league.

Although some of the players chosen in the draft had played semi-professional or professional basketball after college graduation, only the United States colleges they attended are listed.

Pos.	G	F	C
Position	Guard	Forward	Center

Round	Pick	Player	Position	Nationality	Team	College	Year graduated
1	1	Vance Cooksey	F/C	United States	Vancouver Knights	Youngstown State	2011
1	2	Jackson Trapp	G	United States	Yakima Sun Kings	Florida Atlantic University	2016
1	3	Glennroy Carr	F	United States	Rochester RazorSharks	Buffalo State University	2011
1	4	Luke Cochran	F	United States	Nevada Desert Dogs	Sonoma State University	2017
1	5	Chris Langoria	G	United States	Kansas City Tornados	Valdosta State University	2016
1	6	Iman Johnson	F	United States	Kentucky Thoroughbreds	Samford University	2016
1	7	Tony Anderson	G	United States	Ohio Cardinals	Southeast Missouri State	2016
1	8	Steven Cunningham	G	United States	Albany Patroons	Troy University	2012
2	9	Alonzo Murphy	F	United States	Vancouver Knights	Lincoln University	2015
2	10	Devonte Luckett	F	United States	Yakima Sun Kings	Yakima Valley Community College	2016
2	11	Isaiah Thomas	G	United States	Rochester RazorSharks	Southeastern Illinois College	2016
2	12	Anthony Strickland	F	United States	Nevada Desert Dogs	South Suburban College	2017
2	13	Jordan Stotts	F	United States	Kansas City Tornados	University of Sioux Falls	2016
2	14	Bright Mensah	G	United States	Kentucky Thoroughbreds	William Paterson University	2016
2	15	Eddie Hayden	G	United States	Ohio Cardinals	West Virginia Tech	2012
2	16	Anthony Estes	G	United States	Albany Patroons	North Carolina A&T	2015
