= Chance Comanche =

American basketball player (born 1996)

Personal information
- Born: April 14, 1996 (age 30) Los Angeles, California, U.S.
- Listed height: 6 ft 10 in (2.08 m)
- Listed weight: 210 lb (95 kg)

Career information
- High school: View Park Prep (Los Angeles, California); Beverly Hills (Beverly Hills, California)
- College: Arizona (2015–2017)
- NBA draft: 2017: undrafted
- Playing career: 2017–2023
- Position: Power forward / center
- Number: 21, 22, 12, 20, 50

Career history
- 2017–2018: Memphis Hustle
- 2019: Canton Charge
- 2021: Enid Outlaws
- 2021–2022: Ankara DSİ S.K.
- 2022–2023: Stockton Kings
- 2023: Portland Trail Blazers

Career highlights
- TBL champion (2021); TBL Most Valuable Player (2021)
- Stats at NBA.com
- Stats at Basketball Reference

Chance Kyler Comanche (born April 14, 1996) is an American former professional basketball player. A 6 ft 10 in (2.08 m) tall power forward/center, he played college basketball for the Arizona Wildcats and played in one game for the Portland Trail Blazers of the National Basketball Association (NBA).

Comanche was playing for the Stockton Kings of the NBA G League in 2023 when he and his ex-girlfriend, Sakari Harnden, were arrested and charged with the kidnap and murder of a 23-year-old woman.

== High school and college career ==
He attended View Park Preparatory High School, before graduating from Beverly Hills High School in 2015, after having averaged 20.1 points, 16 rebounds and four blocks per game as a senior en route to a Southern Section 3A title.

In his two years at the University of Arizona (2015–2017), Comanche saw the court in 60 games, producing averages of 4.9 points and 2.8 boards a contest. On April 8, 2017, he declared for the 2017 NBA draft and on May 5, 2017, announced his decision to forgo the remaining two years of his college eligibility and to stay in the draft. However, he was not selected by any team.

== Professional career ==
After going undrafted, Comanche joined the Drew League, a pro-am league after not being invited to the NBA Summer League.

=== Memphis Hustle (2017–2018) ===
On November 2, 2017, he joined the Memphis Hustle of the NBA G League. In his first season of play, he averaged 9.2 points and 5.4 rebounds per game for the Hustle. He would not be on the Memphis Hustle's roster for the 2018–19 season.

=== Canton Charge (2019) ===
On January 7, 2019, the Canton Charge acquired Comanche from the Memphis Hustle for one of the Raptors 905's 2019 second-round pick and the returning rights to Jordan Mathews. Comanche would later play with the Canton Charge during the rest of the 2018–19 season. However, he would not play with the Charge during the 2019–20 season or the 2020–21 bubble shortened season.

=== Enid Outlaws (2021) ===
In 2021, Comanche signed with the Enid Outlaws of The Basketball League. On April 19, he scored 43 points in a 152–78 win against the Lewisville Leopards. Comanche averaged 27.4 points, 12.9 rebounds, 2.1 assists and 1.3 blocks per game.

=== Ankara DSİ S.K. (2021) ===
On June 24, 2021, he signed with Ankara DSİ S.K. (Yeni Mamak Spor) of the Turkish Basketball First League. On December 21, he was named the league's player of the week after posting 24 points and 16 rebounds in a win against Bornova Belediyespor.

=== Stockton Kings (2022–2023) ===
On November 3, 2022, Comanche was named to the opening night roster for the Stockton Kings.

=== Portland Trail Blazers (2023) ===
On April 9, 2023, Comanche signed with the Portland Trail Blazers. Comanche made his only NBA appearance on that same day, recording 7 points, 3 rebounds, and a block in 21 minutes of action in a 157–101 loss to the Golden State Warriors.

=== Return to Stockton (2023) ===
On October 2, 2023, Comanche signed an Exhibit 10 deal with the Sacramento Kings, but was waived on October 12. On November 9, 2023, Comanche rejoined the Stockton Kings, but was waived on December 15. He was released by the team after having been arrested by the FBI as "a person of interest" in connection with a disappearance of a woman in Las Vegas named Marayna Rodgers. The disappearance was first reported on December 7, with Comanche later playing for the Stockton Kings that same night in a 103–99 loss to the Rip City Remix at the Chiles Center. However, the incident was considered to have been planned since December 4, with the Stockton Kings being around the Las Vegas area for a game against the NBA G League Ignite in Henderson, Nevada on December 5 as one of the select few games that season where the NBA G League Ignite would win before being dissolved at the end of their final season of existence.

== Murder charge ==
Comanche was released by the Stockton Kings of the NBA G League on December 15, 2023, after his arrest on kidnapping charges by the FBI in connection with the disappearance of 23-year-old Lynnwood, Washington, native Marayna Rodgers. Rodgers had been reported missing in Las Vegas, Nevada, on December 7. Comanche's former girlfriend, 19-year-old Sakari Harnden, whom he had dated the previous year, had been arrested two days before in Las Vegas on charges relating to Rodgers' disappearance.

Rodgers' remains were found in the Nevada desert days after Comanche admitted to police that he had strangled Rodgers and disposed of her body; he also showed the police on a map where her remains were located. On January 2, 2024, it was announced that separate murder, kidnapping and conspiracy charges would be combined so that both Comanche and Harnden could be tried together. Comanche's lawyer asked the Las Vegas court to declare him indigent due to his spending "all of his and his family's funds to hire counsel".

It was reported on March 28 of that year that Nevada prosecutors would not seek the death penalty against Comanche if he was convicted. On April 3, state authorities announced that Comanche's trial would begin on March 10, 2025, but the trial date has been continued several times, and it is now expected to take place in 2026. Comanche and Harnden have both pleaded not guilty to four charges relating to kidnapping and murder.

== Career statistics ==
Legend
GP	Games played	GS	Games started	MPG	Minutes per game
FG%	Field goal percentage	3P%	3-point field goal percentage	FT%	Free throw percentage
RPG	Rebounds per game	APG	Assists per game	SPG	Steals per game
BPG	Blocks per game	PPG	Points per game	**Bold**	Career high

=== College ===
Year	Team	GP	GS	MPG	FG%	3P%	FT%	RPG	APG	SPG	BPG	PPG
2015–16	Arizona	23	0	6.0	.485	–	.688	1.6	.2	.0	.3	1.9
2016–17	Arizona	**37**	**2**	**18.1**	**.571**	–	**.730**	**3.6**	**.4**	**.1**	**.4**	**6.3**
Career		60	2	13.5	.556	–	.722	2.8	.3	.1	.4	4.6

=== NBA G League ===
==== Showcase Cup ====
Year	Team	GP	GS	MPG	FG%	3P%	FT%	RPG	APG	SPG	BPG	PPG
2022–23	Stockton	11	5	21.5	.609	.167	**.800**	5.0	**1.6**	.8	1.1	12.5
2023–24	Stockton	**13**	**9**	**24.6**	**.628**	**.273**	**.800**	**7.0**	.9	**.9**	**1.2**	**14.2**
Career		24	14	23.2	.620	.235	.800	6.1	1.3	.9	1.1	13.4

==== Regular season ====
Year	Team	GP	GS	MPG	FG%	3P%	FT%	RPG	APG	SPG	BPG	PPG
2017–18	Memphis	**45**	**14**	18.3	.589	.000	.714	5.7	.6	.3	.7	9.2
2018–19	Canton	27	8	13.8	.460	.000	.787	3.9	.5	.2	.7	4.7
2022–23	Stockton	32	5	**22.9**	**.622**	**.250**	**.806**	**8.0**	**1.2**	**.5**	**1.5**	**13.0**
Career		104	27	18.5	.585	.214	.756	5.9	.8	.4	1.0	9.2

==== Playoffs ====
Year	Team	GP	GS	MPG	FG%	3P%	FT%	RPG	APG	SPG	BPG	PPG
2023	Stockton	1	0	15.0	.667	–	–	3.0	1.0	1.0	.0	8.0

=== NBA ===
==== Regular season ====
Year	Team	GP	GS	MPG	FG%	3P%	FT%	RPG	APG	SPG	BPG	PPG
2022–23	Portland	1	0	21.0	.600	—	.250	3.0	.0	.0	1.0	7.0
