= O'Connell Sports Center =

Multi-purpose sports arena in Vancouver, Washington

Coordinates: 45°38′10″N 122°39′04″W

The O'Connell Sports Center is a multi-purpose sports arena on the campus of Clark College in Vancouver, Washington, United States. It is home to the Clark College Penguins and the Vancouver Volcanoes of The Basketball League. The arena hosted the 2011 International Basketball League playoffs, which were won by the Volcanoes.
