= Western Oklahoma SkyKings =

Professional Basketball Team

Muskogee Sky Kings
- League: The Basketball League 2022-present
- Founded: 2022
- History: Wichita SkyKings; 2022-2024; Western Oklahoma Skykings; 2025; Muskogee Sky Kings; 2026-present
- Arena: Muskogee High School
- Location: Muskogee, Oklahoma
- Team colors: Purple, gold, black
- Ownership: OnPoint Operations Group, LLC

The Western Oklahoma SkyKings are an American professional basketball team from El Reno, Oklahoma that plays in the Central Conference of The Basketball League (TBL).

== History ==
In November 2022, TBL's CEO, Evelyn Magley, announced that the Wichita Sky Kings will be playing in the Central Conference for the upcoming 2023 season.

The team is owned by Lebanese-American businessman Ben Hamd. Hamd is the founder of Brookwood Capital Advisors, a real estate investment company that redevelops properties across the U.S., including Wichita, Kansas. According to Hamd, the team's name is a nod to Wichita's aviation history as birthplace of Cessna Aircraft Company, now owned by Textron. The name "Sky Kings" derives from 1950's radio-turned TV show Sky King about a Cessna aircraft pilot of the same name.

Sean Flynn was named as head coach for the Sky Kings' debut season. Flynn was head coach for the Pratt Community College Beavers from 2018 to 2021 where he held a 44 and 40 record. Flynn's assistant coach is former New Mexico State manager César Luján Flores.

Brian Baumgartner, American actor known for playing Kevin Malone in the NBC sitcom The Office, attended the Sky Kings' opening week.

In 2025 the team relocated to Altus, Oklahoma and was renamed the Western Oklahoma SkyKings.

== Wichita SkyKings History ==
According to head coach Sean Flynn, the Sky Kings' roster is composed of players from Division I and Division II schools. Notable acquisitions include Teddy Allen, Charlie Marquardt, and Justin Moss.

Teddy Allen formerly played for the New Mexico State Aggies, where he ranked 29th nationally in scoring and led the Aggies to an NCAA tournament win after scoring 37 points against Connecticut. During 2022 alone, Allen was recognized as WAC Player of the Year, WAC Tournament Most Valuable Player, and WAC Newcomer of the Year.

From 2018 to 2019, Charlie Marquardt played for G-League NBA team the Brooklyn Nets. Marquardt went on to win the 2021 TBL championship with the Enid Outlaws and played for the Syracuse Stallions in 2022.

Justin Moss formerly played for Blue Collar U, the winning team of The Basketball Tournament 2022 and a $2 million purse.

== Home Arena ==
The Sky King's home arena is Western Oklahoma State College.

== Season ==
The Sky's Kings' season lasts from March through June. The leagues' season ends with a championship tournament between finalists among all four TBL conferences.
