= Justin Moss =

American basketball player (born 1993)

No. 4 – Halcones de Ciudad Obregón
- Position: Power forward
- League: CIBACOPA

Personal information
- Born: June 19, 1993 (age 33) Detroit, Michigan, U.S.
- Listed height: 6 ft 8 in (2.03 m)
- Listed weight: 240 lb (109 kg)

Career information
- High school: Romulus (Romulus, Michigan)
- College: Indian Hills CC (2012–2013); Buffalo (2013–2015)
- NBA draft: 2016: undrafted
- Playing career: 2015–present

Career history
- 2015–2017: Orangeville A's
- 2017–2018: Aubenas
- 2018: Tarbes-Lourdes
- 2019–2020: KW Titans
- 2021: Soles de Mexicali
- 2021: Zakho SC
- 2021: Brownstown Bears
- 2022: Detroit Hustle
- 2022: Syracuse Stallions
- 2023: Windsor Express
- 2023: Larre Borges
- 2023–2024: Khasin Khuleguud
- 2024: Cañeros del Este
- 2024–2025: Nalaikh Bison
- 2025: Soles de Mexicali
- 2026–: Halcones de Ciudad Obregón

Career highlights
- The League winner (2024); MAC Player of the Year (2015); First-team All-MAC (2015); AP honorable mention All-American (2015)

Justin Trevon Moss (born June 19, 1993) is an American professional basketball player for the Nalaikh Bison of The League. He played college basketball with the Buffalo Bulls.

== Collegiate career ==
Moss committed to Toledo out of high school but was sidelined before his freshman year after being diagnosed with hypertrophic cardiomyopathy, a heart condition thought to be career-ending. Despite having an implantable cardioverter-defibrillator implanted into his chest, Toledo refused to clear Moss to play but offered to allow him to remain at the school on an athletic scholarship.

As a result, Moss transferred to Indian Hills Community College in Iowa where he played one season before joining his former high school coach Nate Oats at Buffalo for his sophomore season. As a junior in 2015, he was named Mid-American Conference Player of the Year and an Associated Press Honorable Mention All-American. Moss received the MAC East Player of the Week award twice that season, once for a week which included a double-double against the top-ranked Kentucky Wildcats. At the conclusion of the spring semester, UB Athletics recognized Moss as the most valuable men's basketball player of the season during the Blue and White Awards Show on ESPN3.

In June 2015, shortly after earning Conference Player of the Year honors, Moss and two of his teammates were discovered to have stolen $650 from Buffalo football players. On August 24, 2015, he was dismissed from the University at Buffalo.

== Professional career ==
Moss signed with the Orangeville A's after leaving school. Moss was named the league's Player of the Week for the week ending April 3, 2016. He finished the season ranked third in the league in rebounds and fourth in points.

In June 2016, he was invited along with six other players to try out for the Philadelphia 76ers prior to the 2016 NBA draft.

After the Orangeville franchise folded, Moss played five games for a team in Panama. In July 2017, he signed a contract to play for Aubenas in the third-tier French Nationale Masculine 1 league.

In 2021, Moss joined Soles de Mexicali of the Mexican Liga Nacional de Baloncesto Profesional. He averaged 9.0 points, 4.7 rebounds, and 1.0 assists per game. On October 21, Moss signed with Zakho SC of the Iraqi Basketball League. On November 12, he signed with the Brownstown Bears of the Maximum Basketball League.

=== Khasiin Khuleguud (2024) ===
In October, 2023, Moss joined the Khasin Khuleguud of The League and won the championships of The League.

=== Nalaikh Bison (2024) ===
In December 2024, Moss joined the Nalaikh Bison of The League.. He averaged 28.3 points, 8.4 rebounds, 1.5 assists, 1.2 steals.
