= Mark Dannhoff =

Potawatomi Fire
- Position: Head coach
- League: TBL

Personal information
- Born: September 7, 1967 (age 59) La Crosse, Wisconsin

Career history

Coaching
- 1990–1992: University of Wisconsin–La Crosse (assistant)
- 1992–1997: Northland Community College
- 1997–1998: Arkansas Tech University (assistant)
- 1998–1999: Little Rock Trojans men's basketball (Director of Basketball Operations)
- 1999–2000: Centenary College
- 2000–2001: University of New Orleans (Director of Basketball Operations)
- 2001–2005: Tulane University (assistant)
- 2005–2007: Georgia State University (assistant)
- 2007–2008: Mercer University (assistant)
- 2008–2009: University of Texas–Rio Grande Valley (assistant)
- 2010–2021: University of Texas–Rio Grande Valley (assistant)
- 2021–2022: Enid Outlaws
- 2023-present: Potawatomi Fire

Mark Dannhoff (born September 7, 1967) is an American basketball coach who serves as head coach for the Potawatomi Fire of The Basketball League (TBL). Dannhoff has been an assistant coach for eight Division I collegiate coaching staffs, including Texas A&M University–Corpus Christi, Georgia State University, and Tulane University.

In November 2021, the Enid Outlaws of TBL announced that the team had hired Dannhoff as its head coach for the 2022 season. In his first season as a professional head coach, Dannhoff guided the Enid Outlaws to a regular season Central Conference Championship and a first-round bye in the TBL Playoffs with a 20–4 win-loss record. The Outlaws advanced to the Central Conference Finals only to fall short in the third game of the best of three series. The Outlaws tied for sixth overall out of forty-four teams in the TBL during the regular season.

In 2022, Dannhoff became head coach for the Potawatomi Fire. Dannhoff led the organization to become the first back-to-back-to-back-to-back TBL National Champions (2023, 2024, 2025, 2026). Dannhoff became the first TBL coach to be named TBL Coach of the Year three straight years (2023–2024–2025). Dannhoff was recently named best head coach in the history of TBL.

In five seasons as a head coach at the professional level, coach Dannhoff has a regular season record of 98 – 8, 33 – 3 Playoff record, and an overall record of 131 – 11 (92.2% winning percentage). In addition, coach Dannhoff has guided his teams to Five straight regular season conference championships, Five Conference Playoff Finals appearances, Four Conference Finals championships, Four West Regional championships, and Four TBL National Championships (2023-2024-2025-2026).
