= Desert Dogs =

Desert Dogs may refer to:

- Glendale Desert Dogs, a baseball team
- Las Vegas Desert Dogs, a lacrosse team
- Mesquite Desert Dogs, originally Nevada Desert Dogs, a basketball team
