= Paul Mokeski =

American basketball player/coach

Personal information
- Born: January 3, 1957 (age 69) Spokane, Washington, U.S.
- Listed height: 7 ft 0 in (2.13 m)
- Listed weight: 255 lb (116 kg)

Career information
- High school: Crespi Carmelite (Encino, California)
- College: Kansas (1975–1979)
- NBA draft: 1979: 2nd round, 42nd overall pick
- Drafted by: Houston Rockets
- Playing career: 1979–1993
- Position: Center
- Number: 54, 53, 44, 45
- Coaching career: 1994–2018

Career history

Playing
- 1979–1980: Houston Rockets
- 1980–1982: Detroit Pistons
- 1982: Cleveland Cavaliers
- 1983–1989: Milwaukee Bucks
- 1989–1990: Cleveland Cavaliers
- 1991: Golden State Warriors
- 1992–1993: Quad City Thunder

Career highlights
- Second-team All-Big Eight (1979)

Career NBA statistics
- Points: 2,764 (4.0 ppg)
- Rebounds: 2,342 (3.4 rpg)
- Assists: 500 (0.7 apg)
- Stats at NBA.com
- Stats at Basketball Reference

Paul Keen Mokeski (born January 3, 1957) is an American former basketball player and coach. Standing 7 ft 0 in, he played the center position. He played for five NBA teams, including six seasons with the Milwaukee Bucks.

Mokeski's last coaching position was as head coach of the Nevada Desert Dogs in North American Premier Basketball in 2018.

== Early career ==
Mokeski played at Crespi Carmelite High School in Los Angeles, California. He went on to play two seasons at the University of Kansas, where he accumulated 680 rebounds, placing him 15th in school history.

== Professional career ==
On the Bucks, Mokeski played a role as a key bench player on several deep playoff runs. During the 1984 NBA Playoffs, he averaged career postseason bests of 6.1 points and 5.5 rebounds in only 20 minutes a game. On March 28, 1985, Mokeski scored a career high 21 points, along with grabbing 7 rebounds, in a 121–116 win over the New York Knicks.

== Career statistics ==
Legend
GP	Games played	GS	Games started	MPG	Minutes per game
FG%	Field goal percentage	3P%	3-point field goal percentage	FT%	Free throw percentage
RPG	Rebounds per game	APG	Assists per game	SPG	Steals per game
BPG	Blocks per game	PPG	Points per game	**Bold**	Career high

=== NBA ===
==== Regular season ====
Year	Team	GP	GS	MPG	FG%	3P%	FT%	RPG	APG	SPG	BPG	PPG
1979–80	Houston	12	-	9.4	.333	.000	.778	2.4	0.2	0.1	0.5	2.4
1980–81	Detroit	**80**	-	22.7	**.489**	.000	.600	5.2	**1.7**	0.5	0.9	**7.1**
1981–82	Detroit	39	3	13.4	.441	.000	.758	3.1	0.6	0.3	0.6	3.2
1981–82	Cleveland	28	1	12.3	.427	.000	.767	3.1	0.4	**0.7**	0.6	3.3
1982–83	Cleveland	23	**18**	**23.4**	.455	.000	.615	**6.0**	1.1	0.5	**1.0**	5.5
1982–83	Milwaukee	50	1	11.8	.460	.000	**.810**	2.4	0.5	0.2	0.4	3.2
1983–84	Milwaukee	68	4	12.3	.479	**.333**	.694	2.4	0.6	0.2	0.4	3.8
1984–85	Milwaukee	79	6	20.1	.478	.000	.698	5.2	1.3	0.4	0.4	6.2
1985–86	Milwaukee	45	0	11.6	.424	.000	.735	3.1	0.7	0.1	0.1	3.2
1986–87	Milwaukee	62	3	10.1	.403	.000	.719	2.2	0.4	0.3	0.2	2.4
1987–88	Milwaukee	60	0	14.1	.476	.000	.708	3.7	0.4	0.5	0.5	4.2
1988–89	Milwaukee	74	0	9.3	.360	.269	.784	2.5	0.5	0.4	0.3	2.2
1989–90	Cleveland	38	1	11.8	.420	.000	.694	2.6	0.4	0.2	0.3	4.0
1990–91	Golden State	36	1	7.1	.356	**.333**	.800	1.9	0.3	0.2	0.1	1.6
Career		694	38	14.0	.451	.216	.694	3.4	0.7	0.3	0.4	4.0

==== Playoffs ====
Year	Team	GP	GS	MPG	FG%	3P%	FT%	RPG	APG	SPG	BPG	PPG
1982–83	Milwaukee	4	-	3.0	.500	.000	.000	0.5	0.3	0.3	0.0	1.0
1983–84	Milwaukee	**16**	-	**20.1**	.540	.000	.667	**5.5**	0.4	0.6	**0.7**	**6.1**
1984–85	Milwaukee	8	0	19.3	.444	.000	**1.000**	4.3	**1.5**	0.3	0.5	5.5
1985–86	Milwaukee	14	0	7.2	.519	.000	.667	1.7	0.6	0.4	0.2	2.4
1986–87	Milwaukee	12	0	8.9	.364	.000	.800	2.4	0.2	0.3	0.2	2.3
1987–88	Milwaukee	4	0	10.0	.357	.000	.667	2.3	0.0	**0.8**	0.5	3.5
1988–89	Milwaukee	5	0	12.2	.571	**1.000**	.750	3.4	0.6	0.0	0.0	4.6
1989–90	Cleveland	3	0	3.3	.500	.000	**1.000**	0.7	0.0	0.3	0.3	1.3
1990–91	Golden State	3	0	2.7	**1.000**	.000	.000	0.7	0.3	0.3	0.0	0.7
Career		69	0	11.8	.486	.250	.742	3.0	0.5	0.4	0.3	3.6

=== College ===
Year	Team	GP	GS	MPG	FG%	3P%	FT%	RPG	APG	SPG	BPG	PPG
1975–76	Kansas	18	-	26.3	.482	-	**.730**	6.4	-	-	-	10.6
1976–77	Kansas	14	-	17.9	.396	-	.625	6.1	-	-	-	6.1
1977–78	Kansas	28	-	23.3	**.518**	-	.574	**8.5**	-	-	-	9.3
1978–79	Kansas	**29**	-	**33.6**	.498	-	.725	8.3	-	-	-	**14.1**
Career		89	-	26.4	.488	-	.683	7.6	-	-	-	10.6

== Coaching career ==
Mokeski was an assistant coach with the Fort Worth Flyers of the NBA D-League. In June 2007, he was hired by the NBA's Charlotte Bobcats as an assistant coach under Sam Vincent. He was let go at the end of the 2007–08 season, when Vincent was fired.

Mokeski was later hired as an assistant coach with the Rio Grande Valley Vipers of the D-League. In September 2011, he became the head coach of the Reno Bighorns. In March 2013, he was relieved of his head coaching duties. He returned to the Vipers for one season before heading north to coach in the National Basketball League of Canada (NBL Canada). In 2016, he was hired as the head coach of the Moncton Miracles, a team that was then being operated by the league. In 2017, the Miracles folded to make way for a new NBL Canada team called the Moncton Magic. NBL Canada commissioner, David Magley, then left the league to become president of a new league called North American Premier Basketball and announced that Mokeski would be one of the inaugural coaches when the league launched in 2018.

On August 16, 2018, Mokeski was named the commissioner of The Basketball League (TBL) for the 2019 season.

== Personal life ==
Mokeski co-hosts a weekly basketball podcast called “The D.Gerv and Big Mo Show” with Derrick Gervin.
