= Patrick Beilein =

American basketball player & coach (born 1983)

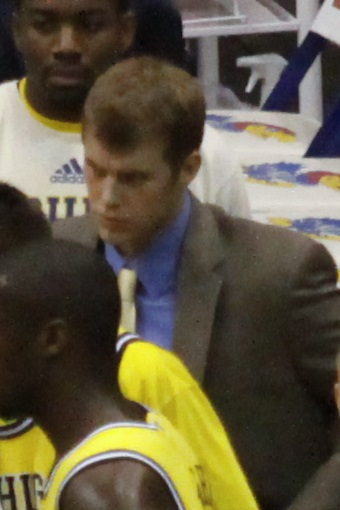
- Beilein in the 2009–10 Michigan Wolverines men's basketball team huddle

Syracuse Stallions
- Title: Head coach
- League: TBL

Personal information
- Born: March 23, 1983 (age 43) Rochester, New York, U.S.
- Listed height: 6 ft 4 in (1.93 m)
- Listed weight: 205 lb (93 kg)

Career information
- High school: Benedictine (Richmond, Virginia)
- College: West Virginia (2002–2006)
- NBA draft: 2006: undrafted
- Playing career: 2006–2008
- Position: Shooting guard

Career history

Playing
- 2006: Landstede Basketbal
- 2007–2008: UCD Marian

Coaching
- 2008–2010: Michigan (GA)
- 2010–2011: Dartmouth (assistant)
- 2011–2012: Bradley (dir. ops.)
- 2012–2014: West Virginia Wesleyan
- 2014–2015: Utah Jazz (assistant)
- 2015–2019: Le Moyne
- 2021–2023: Syracuse Stallions
- 2025–present: Mohawk Valley

Career highlights
- NE-10 tournament championship (2018); NCAA DII Regional championship (2018); 2× NE-10 Coach of the Year (2017, 2018)

Patrick Jonathan Beilein (born March 23, 1983) is an American former basketball player and current coach of Mohawk Valley Community College.

Beilein has served as an American college basketball coach and is the former men's basketball head coach at Niagara University. He has previously served as an assistant coach for the Utah Jazz of the National Basketball Association and Dartmouth Big Green men's basketball of NCAA Division I as well as the head coach at West Virginia Wesleyan College and Le Moyne College of NCAA Division II. He is the son of John Beilein and has served on his father's coaching staff at University of Michigan. He played for his father John Beilein at West Virginia University where he tallied a total of 1001 career points. He earned Northeast-10 Conference Coach of the Year in 2017. In 2018, he became the first coach to lead his team to back-to-back NCAA Division II Tournament number one seeds in ten seasons and repeated as Northeast-10 Conference Coach of the Year.

On October 24, 2019, Niagara announced that Beilein would resign as head coach of the men's basketball program after just seven months and before coaching his first game, citing personal reasons.

== Early life ==
Beilein, who was born in Rochester, New York, is the second child and oldest of three sons of John and Kathleen Beilein. He was born on March 23, 1983, which he says was the day before his father began a nine-year stint at Le Moyne as head coach. He is an alumnus of Benedictine High School in Richmond, Virginia.

== Playing career ==
Beilein initially committed to play for his father's 2002 recruiting class at Richmond along with Johannes Herber and J. D. Collins, but the class went along with coach Beilein to West Virginia when he got that job. Beilein played 128 games for the West Virginia from 2002 to 2006, scoring 1001 points. He was part of West Virginia teams that reached the elite eight and sweet sixteen rounds of the 2005 and 2006 NCAA Division I men's basketball tournament. A roommate of Mike Gansey, Beilein was the sixth man for the 2006 team and for a time (as he vied with Kevin Pittsnogle) held the school record for career three point shots made. He served as captain as a senior. He graduated from West Virginia University with 242 three-point field goals made and a Bachelor of Science in athletic coaching education. He played for the Houston Rockets in the 2006 NBA Summer League. He then played for Landstede Zwolle in the Dutch Basketball League in 2006 and then UCD Marian in the Ireland SuperLeague in 2007–08.

== Coaching career ==
Beilein served as a graduate assistant for the 2008–09 and 2009–10 Michigan Wolverines men's basketball teams. While a graduate assistant at Michigan, he pursued a graduate degree at the Horace H. Rackham School of Graduate Studies. He then served as an assistant coach to Paul Cormier for the 2010–11 Dartmouth Big Green team, as the director of basketball operations for the 2011–12 Bradley Braves, and as the head men's basketball coach at NCAA Division II West Virginia Wesleyan College from 2012 to 2014. The position at West Virginia Wesleyan College in Buckhannon, WV was just an hour from Morgantown, WV, where Beilein had played collegiately for his father. He succeeded Jim Boone at West Virginia Wesleyan. At West Virginia Wesleyan the team improved from 12–15 during his first season to 20–12 in his second year. Beilein interviewed for the NCAA Division I head coaching job at Marist before becoming a player development coach for the 2014–15 Utah Jazz under Quin Snyder.

Beilein became the head coach at Division II Le Moyne in 2015. At Le Moyne, his first game was a 2015 exhibition matchup against his father's Michigan Wolverines at Crisler Center that was attended by 70 relatives. The 15 head coaches in the Northeast-10 Conference, elected Beilein as the 2016–17 conference Coach of the Year. That season, he led Le Moyne to the number 1 seed and the host in the NCAA Division II East Regional. The team was upset in overtime by Merrimack College.

In 2018, Le Moyne went on a 12-game win streak, their second longest in program history. The team went on to earn the Northeast-10 Conference Southwest Division's top seed in the 2018 Northeast-10 Conference tournament. They won the 2018 Northeast-10 Conference tournament. They earned a number one seed in the NCAA Division II East Regional, marking the first time an NCAA DII school has hosted an NCAA regional as a number one seed in consecutive seasons since Bentley University in 2007 and 2008. He repeated as Northeast-10 Conference Coach of the Year. Le Moyne's March 10 victory over Thomas Jefferson University established many records and firsts: It marked the team's 25th win of the season, which surpassed the 24-win mark established in 1988 (by his father's team) and tied in 1996; It marked the school's 1000th victory; It marked Le Moyne's first NCAA tournament opening round victory since a 1964 win over Youngstown State University and the school's first NCAA tournament victory since a 1988 consolation game victory over Kutztown University. The school's March 11 victory over The College of Saint Rose earned the school its first NCAA tournament regional championship game birth, which they won. The 24th ranked Le Moyne Dolphins lost to 11th ranked West Texas A&M University on March 20 in the Division II quarterfinals, finishing the season with a school-record 27 wins against 7 losses.

In March 2019, Beilein was hired as head coach for the Niagara Purple Eagles men's basketball. However, on October 24, 2019, just weeks before the beginning of the season, Beilein resigned for "personal reasons", with assistant coach and former Duke standout Greg Paulus named as his replacement on an interim basis.

On September 1, 2021, the Syracuse Stallions of The Basketball League named him as the new head coach of the team. He became a head coach of the Baldwinsville High School boys high school basketball team in 2022, and resigned in 2024.

Beilein was named head coach at Mohawk Valley Community College on July 22, 2025.

== Personal life ==
Beilein has two younger brothers, Mark and Andrew, and an elder sister, Seana Hendricks.

== Head coaching record ==
Record table
Season	Team	Overall	Conference	Standing	Postseason
West Virginia Wesleyan Bobcats (WVIAC) (2012–2013)
2012–13	West Virginia Wesleyan	12–15	9–13		
West Virginia Wesleyan Bobcats (MEC) (2013–2014)
2013–14	West Virginia Wesleyan	20–12	14–8		
West Virginia Wesleyan:		32–27 (.542)	23–21 (.523)		
Le Moyne Dolphins (NE-10) (2015–2019)
2015–16	Le Moyne	10–17	7–13	T–4th (Southwest)	
2016–17	Le Moyne	22–7	16–4	1st (Southwest)	NCAA Division II first round
2017–18	Le Moyne	27–7	18–2	1st (Southwest)	NCAA Division II Elite Eight
2018–19	Le Moyne	18–10	14–6	1st (Southwest)	NCAA Division II First Round
Le Moyne:		77–41 (.653)	55–25 (.688)		
Total:		109–68 (.616)			
National champion Postseason invitational champion Conference regular season champion Conference regular season and conference tournament champion Division regular season champion Division regular season and conference tournament champion Conference tournament champion
