= Massachusetts Monarchs =

- League: The Basketball League
- Founded: 2021
- History: South Shore Monarchs; 2021; Massachusetts Monarchs; 2022
- Arena: Thurgood Marshall Middle School
- Location: Lynn, Massachusetts, USA
- Team colors
- Head coach: David Harrison
- Website: Official website

The Mass Monarchs were an American professional basketball team based in Lynn, Massachusetts, and a member of The Basketball League (TBL).

== History ==
On July 16, 2020, Evelyn Magley, CEO of The Basketball League, announced a new franchise called the South Shore Monarchs owned by Damon Harper would be located in the South Shore area of Boston.

On May 15, 2021, the league announced the team would be owned by Dwayne Thomas. He is the founder, chief executive officer, and chief learning strategist for ACES Network. The team announced that they would rebrand as the Massachusetts Monarchs for the 2022 season.
