= Charlotte Purple Jackets =

- League: The Basketball League
- Founded: 2021
- History: Connecticut Cobras; 2022; Charlotte Purple Jackets; 2023
- Arena: Garinger High School
- Location: Charlotte, North Carolina
- Team colors
- Head coach: Glen Davis
- Ownership: Aaron Hill
- Website: Official website

The Charlotte Purple Jackets, are an American basketball team based in Charlotte, North Carolina, and members in the minor professional The Basketball League (TBL).

== History ==
On August 3, 2021, Evelyn Magley, CEO of The Basketball League (TBL), announced a new franchise called the Connecticut Cobras owned by Anthony Hill and would be located in Norwalk Connecticut. Hill named Troy Bradford, the team's first head coach on August 24, 2022.

The team announced that their home games would be played at the University of Bridgeport.

On August 24, 2022, Evelyn Magley, CEO of The Basketball League (TBL), announced a new franchise called the Charlotte Purple Jackets would compete in the Southeast Conference. The Charlotte Purple Jackets team is a combination of the TBL's Connecticut Cobras team from last season and the Queen City Purple Jackets team that played in the 2021-22 American Basketball Association.
