= Lake Erie Jackals =

American basketball team in Erie, Pennsylvania

- League: Basketball Super League
- Founded: 2016; 10 years ago
- History: Lake Erie Jackals; 2025–present Jamestown Jackals; 2016–2025
- Arena: McComb Fieldhouse
- Location: Edinboro, Pennsylvania
- Team colors: Blue, black, grey, white
- Head coach: Raheem Singleton
- Ownership: Kayla Crosby
- Conference titles: 2 (2018, 2022)
- Division titles: 2 (2018, 2022)
- Website: lakeeriejackals.com
Home	Away

The Lake Erie Jackals are a professional basketball team based in the Erie, Pennsylvania, metropolitan area, and members of the Basketball Super League (BSL). Formerly located in Jamestown, New York, the team relocated to Erie for the 2025–26 season and play at the McComb Fieldhouse on the campus of PennWest Edinboro. The team uses "Lake Erie" as its regional identifier as a way to include both Erie County, Pennsylvania and Chautauqua County, New York.

== History ==
The Jamestown Jackals were established in 2015 by entrepreneur and community leader Kayla Crosby under the nonprofit organization #IntegrityFirst, Inc. The team was founded with a dual mission: to compete at a high level of professional basketball while promoting positive character development, youth mentorship, and community engagement throughout western New York. Crosby’s leadership emphasized a holistic model of sport, blending athletic excellence with social impact.

The franchise began play in the Premier Basketball League (PBL) during the 2016 season. The Jackals competed in the PBL for two seasons before the league folded following the 2017 campaign, leaving the organization temporarily without a competitive home.

In 2018, the team joined the North American Basketball League (NABL) as part of the league’s newly created Northeast Division. The Jackals quickly proved to be a dominant force, capturing the NABL Northeast Division Championship in their debut season. They advanced to the 2018 NABL Championship Game before ultimately falling to the Dallas Mustangs in the national final.

On August 29, 2018, Crosby announced that the Jackals would join The Basketball League (TBL) for the 2019 season, marking the organization’s elevation to a fully professional circuit. Under Crosby’s continued leadership as owner and general manager, the franchise gained a reputation for its disciplined play, community service, and regional influence. Following the team’s first TBL season, Crosby was appointed the league’s Director of Team Development, where she helped expand the league’s national footprint and support emerging franchises. During their tenure in TBL, the Jackals were widely recognized for their “Be The Change” initiative, which used basketball as a platform for mentoring youth and promoting social responsibility.

The 2024 season ended in controversy when referees called off a playoff game between the Jackals and the Raleigh Firebirds after a fan threatened a Jamestown player who was subsequently ejected. The unusual circumstances led to a forfeit victory awarded to Raleigh and an abrupt conclusion to Jamestown’s postseason run.

In October 2024, the organization announced its departure from TBL and its acceptance into the Basketball Super League (BSL), a higher-tier professional league seeking to unify elite North American teams under a single competitive structure. During a December 2024 community banquet, Crosby reaffirmed the team’s long-term commitment to western New York while acknowledging the increased financial and logistical demands of joining the BSL. The Jackals earned their first BSL victory later that season with a 122–111 win over the Pontiac Pharaohs.

== Relocation to Pennsylvania ==
In October 2025, the Jackals announced that the franchise would relocate to Erie for the 2025–26 season, marking a new era in the organization’s history. The Jackals are the first professional basketball in the Erie market since 2021, when the former Erie BayHawks of the NBA G League moved away.

== Season-by-season record ==
Note: Statistics are correct as of the 2024–25 season.

League champions	Conference champions	Division champions	Playoff berth

Season	Conference	Finish	Division	Finish	Wins	Losses	Win%	GB	Playoffs	Awards	Head coach	Ref.
2016	—	—	Northeast	2nd	11	8	.579		Lost quarterfinal (716ers) 87–92			
2017	—	4th	—	—	9	7	.500		Lost semifinal (Razorsharks) 91–98		Brandon Siskavich	
2018	Eastern	1st	Northeast	1st	4	2	.667		Won conference championship (Titans) 118–107; Lost NABL championship (Mustangs) 105–112		Mark Anderson	
2019	—	6th	—	—	14	13	.519		Did not qualify.		Mark Anderson	
2020	—	3rd	—	—	8	3	.727		No playoffs held due to COVID-19 pandemic.		Kayla Crosby	
2021	East	2nd	—	—	16	6	.727		Won quarterfinal series (Coyotes) 1–2; Lost semifinal series (Stallions) 1–2		Brandon Lesovsky	
2022	Midwest	1st	Upper Midwest	1st	18	5	.783		Lost second round series (Glass City B.C) 0–2		Raheem Singleton	
2023	—	—	Upper Midwest	4th	11	13	.458	7	Did not qualify.		Raheem Singleton	
2024	—	—	Northeast	4th	13	10	.565	6.5	Lost play-in (Firebirds) by forfeit		Raheem Singleton	
2024-25	—	4th	—	—	15	10	.600		Won play-in (Lightning) 104–100		Raheem Singleton	
