= Vancouver Bears =

American basketball team

- Division: Pacific
- League: Current 94x50 League USBL 2026; TBL 2021–2025; IBL 2005-2014
- Founded: 2005
- History: Vancouver Bears; 2026–present Vancouver Volcanoes; 2005–2014, 2021–2025
- Arena: O’Connell Sports Center; 2026–present O'Connell Sports Center; 2008–2014, 2021-2025; Mountain View High School; 2007
- Location: Vancouver, Washington
- President: Curtis Hill
- Head coach: Calvin Hampton; Curtis Hill Darius Rice GM Greg Crawford
- Ownership: Curtis Hill
- Championships: 1 (2011)
- Division titles: 3 (2010, 2011, 2024)
- Website: www.vancouverbears.com

The Vancouver Bears are a professional basketball team based in Vancouver, Washington that plays in 94x50 League. Previously, the team competed as the Vancouver Volcanoes in the International Basketball League and The Basketball League

The team has played at several arenas throughout their existence, and currently play in O’Connell Sports Center

== History ==
=== International Basketball League (2005–2014) ===
The team's 2005 inaugural season was a huge disappointment. The team started 0–7, and went on to go 4–18. The Volcanoes were led in scoring by Charles McKinney (20.7 ppg). Despite high hopes in 2006, the Volcanoes were mediocre again, posting a 4–21 record. Brad Lechtenberg led the team in scoring at 25.0 ppg. He and Kevin "Pip" Bloodsaw (19.6 ppg) were IBL All-Stars in 2006.

During the 2011 season, the Vancouver Volcanoes began to show signs of success both on and off the court for team owner Bryan Hunter. The team won its first IBL title, defeating Edmonton. The franchise were runners-up in the 2013 and 2014 seasons before the IBL ceased operations in 2014. The Volcanoes played in the 2015 Portland Pro-Am before also ceasing operations.

=== The Basketball League (2022–2025) ===
On November 2, 2020, The Basketball League (TBL) announced the Portland Storm was approved as expansion franchise for the 2021 season owned by Curtis Hill. The team decided to sit out for the season due to the COVID-19 pandemic. Prior to the 2022 season, former team owner of the Vancouver Volcanoes, Bryan Hunter sold the team's image and rights to Curtis Hill, who relocated his Portland Storm to Vancouver.

In 2022 the team was coached by Head Coach Jeff Perrault and Assistant Coach Curtis Hill. The team finished 7-17. Guard Jaylyn Richardson made All TBL Western Conference 1st team while Guard Andre McCowan made 2nd team.

In 2023 the Volcanoes were coached by Associate Head Coaches Curtis Hill and Calvin Hampton. The team finished with a 8–15 record and was eliminated by the Salem Capitals in the play in game. Guard Jaylyn Richardson made All TBL 2nd Team and made 1st Team All Western Conference.

In 2024 the Volcanoes finished the regular season 1st in the Pacific North West Division with a 16–4 record. The Volcanoes were eliminated by The Seattle Super Hawks in the Pacific Northwest Finals. Guard Markus Golder made the TBL All Star Game. Markus Golder made 2nd team All TBL and 1st team All TBL Western Conference. Forward Tyshon Pickett was named to 2nd team All Western Conference.

=== United States Basketball League (2026) ===
Following the 2025 TBL season, the team was renamed to the Vancouver Bears and left to join the United States Basketball League (USBL).

=== 94x50 Basketball League (2027) ===
Following the 2026 USBL season it was announced via Instagram that it will join the 94x50 league.

== Season-by-season ==
Regular Season
Year	Games	Wins	Losses	Percentage	League	Division
2005	22	4	18	.181	15th - IBL	8th - Western Division
2006	25	4	21	.160	23rd - IBL	12th - Western Division
2007	23	6	17	.260	17th - IBL	4th - Western Division
2008	25	18	7	.720	4th - IBL	2nd - Western Division
2009	23	15	8	.652	4th - IBL	2nd - Continental Division
2010	23	16	7	.696	5th - IBL	1st - Continental Division
2011	21	15	6	.714	1st - IBL	1st - Continental Division
2012	20	11	9	.550	5th - IBL	3rd - Continental Division
2013	21	16	5	.762	3rd - IBL	3rd - International Division
2014	19	13	6	.684	2nd - IBL	3rd - International Division
2022	26	7	19	.269	34th - TBL	4th - West Conference
2023	23	8	15	.348	37th - TBL	7th - West Conference
2024	22	16	6	.727	5th - TBL	1st - Pacific Northwest Division
2025	14	3	11	.214	26th - TBL	5th - Pacific Northwest Division
Total	307	152	155	.496		

== Coaching roster ==
Head Coach	Season
Coach Terrence Dickenson	2005-2006
Coach Jason Philips	2007
Coach Theo Epstein	2008-2009
Coach Bryan Hunter	2010-2012
Coach Joe Navarro	2012-2014
Coach Jeff Perrault	2022
Coach Calvin Hampton/Coach Curtis Hill	2023-Present
