= Waco Royals =

- League: The Basketball League
- Founded: 2020
- History: Waco Royals; 2021–present
- Location: Waco, Texas
- Team colors: Purple, black, gold
- President: Brandon Littles
- Ownership: Brandon Littles and Russell Renee Huitt

The Waco Royals are a professional basketball team in Waco, Texas, and members of The Basketball League (TBL).

== History ==
August 9, 2020, The Basketball League (TBL) announced the Waco Royals were approved as an expansion franchise for the upcoming 2021 season. The team is owned by Brandon Littles and Russell Renee Huitt On December 15, 2020, it was announced that Mamodou Diene would be the team's head coach.
