= Houston Push =

Basketball team in Houston, Texas

- League: The Basketball League
- Founded: 2021
- History: Houston Push; 2021–present
- Location: Houston, Texas
- Team colors
- General manager: Moochie Norris
- Head coach: James White
- Ownership: Steve Francis

The Houston Push are a professional basketball team in Houston, Texas, and members of The Basketball League (TBL).

== History ==
On December 31, 2020, it was announced that Retired NBA All Star, Steve Francis, was awarded the ownership of a new franchise called the Houston Push for the upcoming 2021 TBL season.

On January 21, 2021 it was announced that Moochie Norris was named the team's head coach and general manager. Timothy McCaleb was announced as the Chief Marketing Officer.

== Current roster ==
Houston Push roster
Players	Coaches
Pos. / No. / Nat. / Name / Ht. / Wt. / Age	Head coach: (United States) James White; Legend: (C) Team captain; Injured
