= Southeast Texas Panthers =

Oklahoma Panthers
- League: The Basketball League
- Founded: 2021
- History: Beaumont Panthers; 2022; Oklahoma Panthers; 2023–present
- Team colors
- General manager: Angela Weathers
- Website: thebeaumontpanthers.com at the Wayback Machine (archived 2021-10-04)

The Oklahoma Panthers, formerly the Southeast Texas Panthers, and Beaumont Panthers, are an American basketball team based in Oklahoma City, Oklahoma, and members of The Basketball League (TBL).

== History ==
From 2008 to 2011, Southeast Texas was home to a professional basketball team as a member of the ABA originally known as the Mustangs, before renaming in 2009 as the Mavericks. The team had three successful seasons and decided to become a professional basketball team. The team requested to join the NBA G League but the offer was declined. The ownership decided to sit the team out for three seasons and move the team to Shreveport, Louisiana in 2013.

On June 4, 2021 The Basketball League announced the Beaumont Panthers, led by retired professional basketball player Kendrick Perkins and his cousin, Jay McDonald, as an expansion team for the 2022 season.

On April 3. 2023, it was announced that the team would be relocated to Oklahoma for the end of the season with the hope of returning to Beaumont for the 2024 season.
