= Great Falls Electric =

- League: The Basketball League
- Founded: 2024
- History: Great Falls Electric
- Arena: Pacific Steel & Recycling Arena
- Location: Great Falls, Montana
- Team colors: Royal blue, Yellow
- General manager: Jim Keough
- Head coach: Broc Finstuen

The Great Falls Electric are an American professional basketball team based out of Great Falls, Montana, and a member of The Basketball League (TBL).

== History ==
It was announced that Great Falls, would be awarded a franchise for the upcoming 2024 TBL season. The team will be led by general manager Jim Keough.

On September 26, 2023, it was announced Elli Winslow would serve as the team's Head of Basketball Operations.

Previously (2006–08), Great Falls was home to the Great Falls Explorers, which competed in the Continental Basketball Association (CBA).
