= Flint United =

- League: The Basketball League
- Founded: 2020
- History: Flint United; 2021–present
- Arena: Dort Financial Center
- Location: Flint, Michigan
- Team colors
- General manager: Matt Washington
- Head coach: Kevin Crosby
- Ownership: Kevin Mays

The Flint United are a professional basketball team in Flint, Michigan, and members of The Basketball League (TBL).

== History ==
On September 18, 2020, it was announced that Flint, Michigan would be awarded a franchise for the upcoming 2021 TBL season. The team is owned by Flint native Kevin Mays, who has experience in sports marketing and development, among different organizations. Mays played a key role for two successful Flint sports franchises: the Flint Firebirds and the Flint City Bucks. Flint native Matt Washington was named the team's general manager. On November 16. 2020, former NBA player and Flint native Charlie Bell was named as the team's inaugural head coach. On November 17, 2021, Keno Davis was named as the new head coach.

Flint hosted a professional basketball team called the Flint Fuze in 2001 and the Flint Pros between the years of 1972–1974 in the Continental Basketball Association.
