= Atlantic City Gambits =

American professional basketball team

- League: TBL
- Established: 2021
- History: Atlantic City Gambits; 2022–2023
- Arena: Atlantic City High School
- Location: Atlantic City, New Jersey
- President: Kamau Johnson
- General manager: Frank Turner
- Head coach: Jim Schafer
- Ownership: DeShawn Ward
- Website: Official website

The Atlantic City Gambits were an American professional basketball team based in Atlantic City, New Jersey, and a member of The Basketball League (TBL).

== History ==
On February 18, 2021, Evelyn Magley, CEO of The Basketball League (TBL), announced a new franchise called the Atlantic City Gambits owned by Robert Baldeo would join the league for the 2022 season. On December 15, 2021, the Atlantic City Press reported that along with new co-owner DeShawn Ward, that the team would begin play in March 2022.

In January 2022, the Gambits announced they would play home games at Atlantic City High School's gymnasium, which had also been the home of the Atlantic City Seagulls, a professional basketball team that played six seasons in the United States Basketball League (USBL), winning three consecutive league titles between 1997 and 1999. The Seagulls briefly reformed under new ownership in the American Basketball Association in 2021, but only played six games.
