= Carolina Coyotes =

Basketball team

- League: The Basketball League
- Founded: 2020
- History: Carolina Coyotes; 2021–present
- Location: Columbia, South Carolina
- Team colors
- General manager: Perry Bradley Perry Bradley Jr
- Head coach: Perry Bradley Jr
- Ownership: Perry Bradley Jermaine Johnson

The Carolina Coyotes are a professional basketball team in Columbia, South Carolina, and members of The Basketball League (TBL).

== History ==
On October 23, 2020, The Basketball League (TBL) announced the Charleston Coyotes were approved as an expansion franchise for the upcoming 2021 season.

The team is owned by Perry Bradley Jr. Building Better Communities and Head Coach of the Carolina Coyotes.

On April 1, 2021, it was announced that the team moved to Columbia, South Carolina and renamed the Carolina Coyotes.
