= Dayton Flight =

- League: The Basketball League
- Founded: 2020
- History: Dayton Flight; 2020–present
- Arena: Wilberforce University
- Location: Dayton, Ohio
- Team colors
- General manager: Brandon Harper
- Head coach: Gary Armstrong
- Ownership: Brandon Harper; Mervin Merencio
- Website: Official website

The Dayton Flight are an American professional basketball team based out of Dayton, Ohio, and a member of The Basketball League (TBL).

== History ==
On August 26, 2019, Evelyn Magley, CEO of The Basketball League (TBL), announced a new franchise called the Dayton Flight with Brandon Harper as general manager. The Flight follow previous minor league basketball teams in Dayton, including the Dayton Wings, Dayton Jets, and Dayton Air Strikers.
