= Mesquite Desert Dogs =

American professional basketball team

- League: The Basketball League
- Founded: 2017
- History: Nevada Desert Dogs; 2018; Mesquite Desert Dogs; 2019–
- Arena: Rising Star Sports Ranch; 2018; Virgin Valley High School; 2019–
- Location: Mesquite, Nevada
- Team colors
- General manager: Carlnel Wiley
- Head coach: Carlnel Wiley

The Mesquite Desert Dogs are an American professional basketball team based in Mesquite, Nevada.

== History ==
On October 30, 2017, North American Premier Basketball (NAPB) announced a team would play in Mesquite, Nevada, for the league's inaugural 2018 season. On October 31, Paul Mokeski was named the head coach and general manager. On November 13, the team name was revealed as the Nevada Desert Dogs.

After the inaugural NAPB season, the league was rebranded as The Basketball League (TBL) and on August 16, 2018, Mokeski was named the commissioner of the league. The Nevada Desert Dogs were also renamed the Mesquite Desert Dogs and assistant coach Carlnel Wiley was promoted to head coach and general manager for the 2019 season.

Sometime during the second season, the Desert Dogs changed its primary home venue to the Virgin Valley High School gymnasium, with at least one home game Hughes Middle School. The league and team continued to have issues with canceled games throughout the season, but the Desert Dogs qualified for a playoff spot.

Prior to the 2020 season, all the other west coast teams in The Basketball League either ceased operations or folded. The Desert Dogs were the last west coast team to withdraw, citing travel costs on November 18, 2019. It was announced that the team would return for the 2026 season for select games.
