= Glass City Wranglers =

- League: Basketball Super League; 2024–present The Basketball League; 2022–2024; Premier Basketball League; 2020–2021
- Founded: 2020
- History: Toledo Glass City B.C; 2020–2022; Glass City Wranglers; 2023–present
- Arena: Glass City Center
- Location: Toledo, Ohio
- Team colors
- Head coach: Benjamin Scofield
- Ownership: Joshua Radtkin
- Championships: 1 (2021 PBL)
- Website: Official website

The Glass City Wranglers, formerly the Toledo Glass City B.C, are a professional basketball team in Toledo, Ohio, and members of the Basketball Super League.

== History ==
The Toledo Glass City B.C were founded in 2020 by Anthony Shook and joined the minor professional Premier Basketball League (PBL) for the 2020–2021 season. On August 30, the team named Freddie Zamora as its head coach. Glass City was unbeaten and won the Premier Basketball League tournament championship, during its first season. On June 23, 2021, the team announced Andrew Lovelace as its new team owner and general manager.

On July 15, 2021, The Basketball League (TBL) announced Glass City would join the league for the 2022 TBL season. On February 25, 2022, the team announced that the home venue would be Owens Community College

On June 15, 2022, the team made national headlines as player Myles Copeland saved the life of referee John Sculli when he had a medical emergency during a playoff game against the Jamestown Jackals.

On August 28, 2024, the Wranglers announced they would join the Basketball Super League for the 2024–2025 season. In October 2024, the team announced their home court would be at Maumee Valley Country Day School.

On November 18, 2025, the Wranglers announced their new head coach would be Benjamin Scofield. He had previously been the team's assistant coach during multiple winning seasons.
