= Tampa Bay Titans =

American professional basketball team

- League: The Basketball League
- Founded: 2018
- History: Tampa Bay Titans; 2019–present
- Arena: Tampa Preparatory School
- Location: Tampa, Florida
- Team colors: Black, gold, white
- General manager: Gerald Williams
- Head coach: Robert Geier
- Ownership: Bassel Harfouch
Home	Away	Third

The Tampa Bay Titans are an American professional basketball team in The Basketball League and are based in Tampa, Florida.

== History ==
On February 25, 2018, Dave Magley stated that Tampa, Florida, was approved as a basketball franchise for the upcoming 2019 season. On July 8, 2018, the team was announced as the Tampa Bay Titans. Bassel Harfouch, the team's owner, became the first ever player-owner in a professional league. He played professionally in Lebanon. After four years of hiatus it was announced the team would return for the 2025 season under new ownership.

== Current roster ==
Tampa Bay Titans roster
Players
Coaches

Pos.	No.	Nat.	Name	Ht.	Wt.	Age
G		(Sudan)	Adub, Aluk	6 ft 6 in (1.98 m)	200 lb (91 kg)	34 – 15 November 1991
G		(United States)	Boans, Tamarrick	6 ft 3 in (1.91 m)		30 – 17 December 1995
G		(United States)	Edwards, Tyshawn	6 ft 3 in (1.91 m)	205 lb (93 kg)	35 – 22 September 1990
G/F		(Lebanon)	Harfouch, Bassel	6 ft 4 in (1.93 m)		32 – 16 December 1993
G		(United States)	Pabon, Pedro	6 ft 4 in (1.93 m)		31 – 24 August 1994
G/F		(United States)	St. Louis, Malcolm	6 ft 6 in (1.98 m)	193 lb (88 kg)	31 – 8 May 1994
G		(United States)	Walker, Romello	6 ft 4 in (1.93 m)		31 – 25 February 1995

Head coach

- (United States) David Reichner

Legend

- (C) Team captain
- Injured

- Roster
Updated: March 4, 2021
