= Columbus Condors =

- League: The Basketball League
- Founded: 2016
- History: Columbus Condors; 2020–2021
- Arena: Otterbein University
- Location: Westerville, Ohio
- Team colors
- Head coach: Darrell Miller
- Ownership: Darrell Miller

The Columbus Condors are a former American professional basketball team based out of Columbus, Ohio, and a member of The Basketball League (TBL).

== History ==
Columbus Condors were founded in 2016 by Darrell Miller and previously competed in the Central Basketball Association and the Premier Basketball League (PBL). On August 29, 2019, it was announced that the team would be joining TBL for the 2020 season.

On February 7, 2020 Otterbein University announced that they would host the Condors.
