= Tri-State Admirals =

American professional basketball team

- League: The Basketball League
- Founded: 2020
- History: Tri-State Admirals; 2020-Present
- Arena: Saint Elizabeth University
- Location: Elizabeth, New Jersey
- Team colors
- Head coach: Daniel Jacob
- Ownership: Daniel Jacob

The Tri-State Admirals are an American professional basketball team based out of New York metropolitan area, and a member of The Basketball League (TBL). Now entering its 6th Season.

== History ==
The Rochester Razorsharks joined the North American Premier Basketball for the 2018 season and planned to play in The Basketball League in 2019 before the team decided to sit out the season. In February 2020, TBL announced the new Rochester Revolution as a 2020 expansion team, but that owner decided to move the team to New Jersey as the Tri-State Admirals.

In 2021, league president, David Magley took over team operations and funded all costs. For the 2022 season, sports marketing consultant, and Columbia University professor Michael Dittleman became team general manager.

=== Current roster ===
Note: Flags indicate national team eligibility at FIBA-sanctioned events. Players may hold other non-FIBA nationalities not displayed.

Tri-State Admirals roster
Players	Coaches
Pos. / No. / Nat. / Name / Ht. / Wt. / Age	Head coach: COACH D AKA Daniel Jacob; Legend: (C) Team captain; Injured
