= Texas 7ers =

- League: The Basketball League
- Founded: 2020
- History: Dallas Skyline; 2020–2022; Texas 7ers 2024– Rockwell 7ers 2022–2023; Texas 7ers 2024–
- Arena: Southwestern Christian College
- Location: Terrell, Texas
- Team colors
- Ownership: Sammie Howard

The Texas 7ers are an American professional basketball team that plays in The Basketball League (TBL).

== History ==
On May 10 2019, it was announced a new franchise called the Dallas Skyline would compete in the 2020 season with Prescott Mack is the team owner. The team decided to sit out the 2023 season.

On January 10, 2022, it was announced a new basketball team, called the Rockwall 7ers would join The Basketball League for the 2022 season. The team market owner is Sammie Howard.

On September 14, 2023 the Rockwell 7ers, announced that the team merged with the Dallas Skyline to become the Texas 7ers for the 2024 season. The team market owner is Sammie Howard.
