= Yakima SunKings =

American minor-league basketball team

- League: Continental Basketball Association; 1990–2008; The Basketball League; 2018–2019, 2025-present
- Founded: (1990-2008); 2017
- History: Kansas City Sizzlers; 1985–1986; Topeka Sizzlers; 1986–1990; Yakima Sun Kings; 1990–2005; Yakama Sun Kings; 2005–2008; Yakima SunKings; 2018–2019
- Arena: Yakima SunDome
- Location: Yakima, Washington, U.S.
- Team colors
- Ownership: Jaime Campos
- Championships: 6 (1995, 2000, 2003, 2006, 2007, 2018)
Home	Away

The Yakima SunKings were a basketball team located in Yakima, Washington, covering the central Washington sports market of Yakima, Tri-Cities, and Ellensburg and played at the Yakima SunDome. The team competed in the Continental Basketball Association from 1990 to 2008. In June 2005, the team was purchased by the Yakama Indian Nation and was renamed the Yakama Sun Kings (from Yakima to Yakama) to honor the Nation.

In 2018, a new version of the team was launched in North American Premier Basketball, which then rebranded as The Basketball League in 2019. The team won the regular season title in both seasons and won the playoff championship in 2018. The league lost western teams prior to the 2020 season and the new SunKings decided against participation in the league.

== History ==
The franchise started in Kansas City, Missouri as the Kansas City Sizzlers, then moved to Topeka, Kansas, before finally relocating to Yakima, Washington. In 1990, the team was purchased by Sacramento attorney Robert Wilson and was led By GM Brooks Ellison. Ex-Major League Baseball player Ted Bowesfield was hired as an adviser. Dianne LaBissionaire, Pat Beehler, and Jay Mahn conducted day-to-day operations. A local contest to select a name was held, and the Yakima Sun Kings was chosen, replacing the old name, "Sizzlers". The team hired local favorite Dean Nicholson as coach. Dennis Rahm became the play-by-play radio announcer and handled media releases.

The Sun Kings was the first team to show a profit in the history of the CBA. The team was fairly successful historically, given the inconsistent nature of minor-league basketball; they won the 1994–95, 1999–2000, 2002–03, 2005–06 and 2006–07 CBA championships. The Sun Kings had a disappointing 2003–04 season when they posted a 10–38 record. They were also 0–9 against the CBA Champion Dakota Wizards.

Ronny Turiaf, a draft pick of the Los Angeles Lakers in 2005, played nine games for the Sun Kings in the 2005–06 season, less than six months after undergoing open-heart surgery which caused the Lakers to void his contract. He averaged 13 points in nine games with the team before re-signing with the Lakers in January 2006.

The Sun Kings won their fourth CBA Championship with a 111–101 victory in Game 3 of a best-of-3 finals series against the Gary Steelheads on March 27, 2006.

In 2006–07 the Sun Kings repeated as champions, sweeping the Albany Patroons three games to none.

On April 10, 2008, the Yakama Nation shut down team operations due to financial losses.

On September 29, 2017, it was announced that the Yakima SunKings would be one of the founding franchises of the North American Premier Basketball. In October 2017, Paul Woolpert was rehired as its head coach and general manager. The team won the inaugural championship. The league became The Basketball League in 2019 and Woolpert left the team. The SunKings then removed itself from the league before the 2020 season as most of the western teams had folded. In Fall of 2025 it was announced that the team returned under new ownership for the 2026 season.

== Current roster ==
Yakima SunKings roster
Players
Coaches

Pos.	No.	Nat.	Name	Ht.	Wt.	Age
F	1	(United States)	Atterberry, Landon	6 ft 6 in (1.98 m)	210 lb (95 kg)	33 – 15 July 1993
G	11	(United States)	Battle, Stephen	6 ft 5 in (1.96 m)	190 lb (86 kg)	35 – 16 April 1991
C		(United States)	Conrad, Jason	7 ft 0 in (2.13 m)	190 lb (86 kg)	37 – 23 April 1989
SF		(United States)	Farmer, Tony	6 ft 7 in (2.01 m)	245 lb (111 kg)	32 – 24 April 1994
G		(United States)	Koshwal, Mac	6 ft 2 in (1.88 m)	200 lb (91 kg)	39 – 19 October 1987
F	3	(United States)	Schuck, Brent	6 ft 9 in (2.06 m)	190 lb (86 kg)	36 – 4 October 1990
PG		(United States)	Trapp, Jackson	6 ft 4 in (1.93 m)	200 lb (91 kg)	33 – 3 November 1992

Head coach

- (United States)

Assistant coach(es)

- (United States) Jim Berndt

Legend

- (C) Team captain
- Injured

- Roster

== Notable former players ==
- Raja Bell (born 1976), basketball player
- Alex Fulton (born 1990), basketball player
- Jim Rowinski, basketball player; 5 seasons total (2 with Topeka, 3 with Yakima)
- Dennis Williams (born 1965), basketball player
