= Owensboro Thoroughbreds =

- League: The Basketball League
- Founded: 2017
- History: Kentucky Thoroughbreds; 2018; Owensboro Thoroughbreds; 2019–present
- Arena: Owensboro Sportscenter
- Location: Owensboro, Kentucky
- Team colors
- General manager: Mark Anderson
- Head coach: Mark Anderson
- Ownership: Chris Allison
- Website: Official website

The Owensboro Thoroughbreds, formerly the Kentucky Thoroughbreds, were an American basketball team based in Owensboro, Kentucky, and members in the minor professional The Basketball League (TBL).

== History ==
On September 13, 2017, North American Premier Basketball (NAPB) announced a team would play in Owensboro, Kentucky, owned by Brandon Lesovsky, a business partner of NAPB founder Dave Magley. The new team replaced the recently folded Kentucky Mavericks of the Premier Basketball League in Owensboro. On October 5, team name was revealed as the Kentucky Thoroughbreds and that owner Lesovsky would also be head coach and general manager. Lesovsky had previously coached the Orangeville A's of the National Basketball League of Canada.

After the first NAPB season, in which the Thoroughbreds went 14–19, the league was rebranded as The Basketball League (TBL). On October 15, 2018, the team announced a name to the Owensboro Thoroughbreds and an ownership change. Veter Dixon became a co-owner and team president while former assistant coach Adam Chrisco was promoted to head coach. In late 2019, Chris Allison became the new team market owner and Mark Anderson, previously the coach of the Jamestown Jackals, was named the head coach for the 2020 season.

== Current roster ==
Owensboro Thoroughbreds roster
Players
Coaches

Pos.	No.	Nat.	Name	Ht.	Wt.	Age
F		(United States)	Burright, Jeremy	6 ft 6 in (1.98 m)
G/F	7	(United States)	Crawford, Robert	6 ft 0 in (1.83 m)
G		(The Bahamas)	Deveaux, Basil	6 ft 4 in (1.93 m)	184 lb (83 kg)
G		(United States)	Griffith, Donavan	6 ft 5 in (1.96 m)
G/F		(United States)	Hayes, Davon	6 ft 7 in (2.01 m)	190 lb (86 kg)
F		(United States)	Hinton, Westley	6 ft 8 in (2.03 m)	190 lb (86 kg)
G		(United States)	Turner, Zavier	5 ft 9 in (1.75 m)	170 lb (77 kg)
G		(United States)	Wilford, Corey	6 ft 2 in (1.88 m)	180 lb (82 kg)	35 – 29 March 1991

Head coach

- (United States) Mark Anderson

Legend

- (C) Team captain
- Injured

- Roster
