= Enid Outlaws =

American professional basketball team

- League: The Basketball League
- Founded: 2020
- History: Oklahoma Outlaws; 2007–2020; Enid Outlaws; 2020–present
- Arena: Stride Bank Center
- Location: Enid, Oklahoma
- Team colors
- General manager: Jonathan Reed
- Head coach: Tat Tucker
- Ownership: Jonathan Reed
- Championships: 2021
- Website: Official website

The Enid Outlaws are an American professional basketball team based in Enid, Oklahoma, and a member of The Basketball League (TBL). For the 2021 season, their home games are played at Stride Bank Center in Enid.

== History ==
On August 18, 2020, Evelyn Magley, CEO of The Basketball League (TBL), announced a new franchise called the Enid Outlaws owned by Jonathan Reed would be located in Enid, Oklahoma.The franchise will be part of a Southwest Division with the Dallas Skyline, Lewisville Leopards, and Little Rock Lightning. The team's owner has operated the Oklahoma Outlaws team that has been around for several years and a member of the semi-professional Universal Basketball Association. At a press conference at the Stride Bank Center, it was announced that Brian Jamison would serve as the team's general manager and Jonathan Reed as president.

The team named Eddie Corporal as the head coach.

The Enid Outlaws defeated the Syracuse Stallions to win the 2021 TBL National Championship. They defeated the Stallions 2-0 in the best of 3 series. Chance Comanche was named Finals MVP.

Enid previously hosted the Oklahoma Storm from 1999 to 2007 in the United States Basketball League.

== Current roster ==
Enid Outlaws roster
Players
Coaches

Pos.	No.	Nat.	Name	Ht.	Wt.	Age
C		(South Sudan)	Tieny Dak, Madit	6 ft 11 in (2.11 m)	200 lb (91 kg)	26 – 6 July 1999
G		(United States)	Jones Jr., Curtis	6 ft 4 in (1.93 m)	180 lb (82 kg)	29 – 28 January 1997

Head coach

- (United States) Ed Corporal

Assistant coach(es)

- (United States) Tom Hughes
- (United States) Dewitte Mandley

Legend

- (C) Team captain
- Injured
