= Dave Magley =

American basketball player and coach (born 1959)

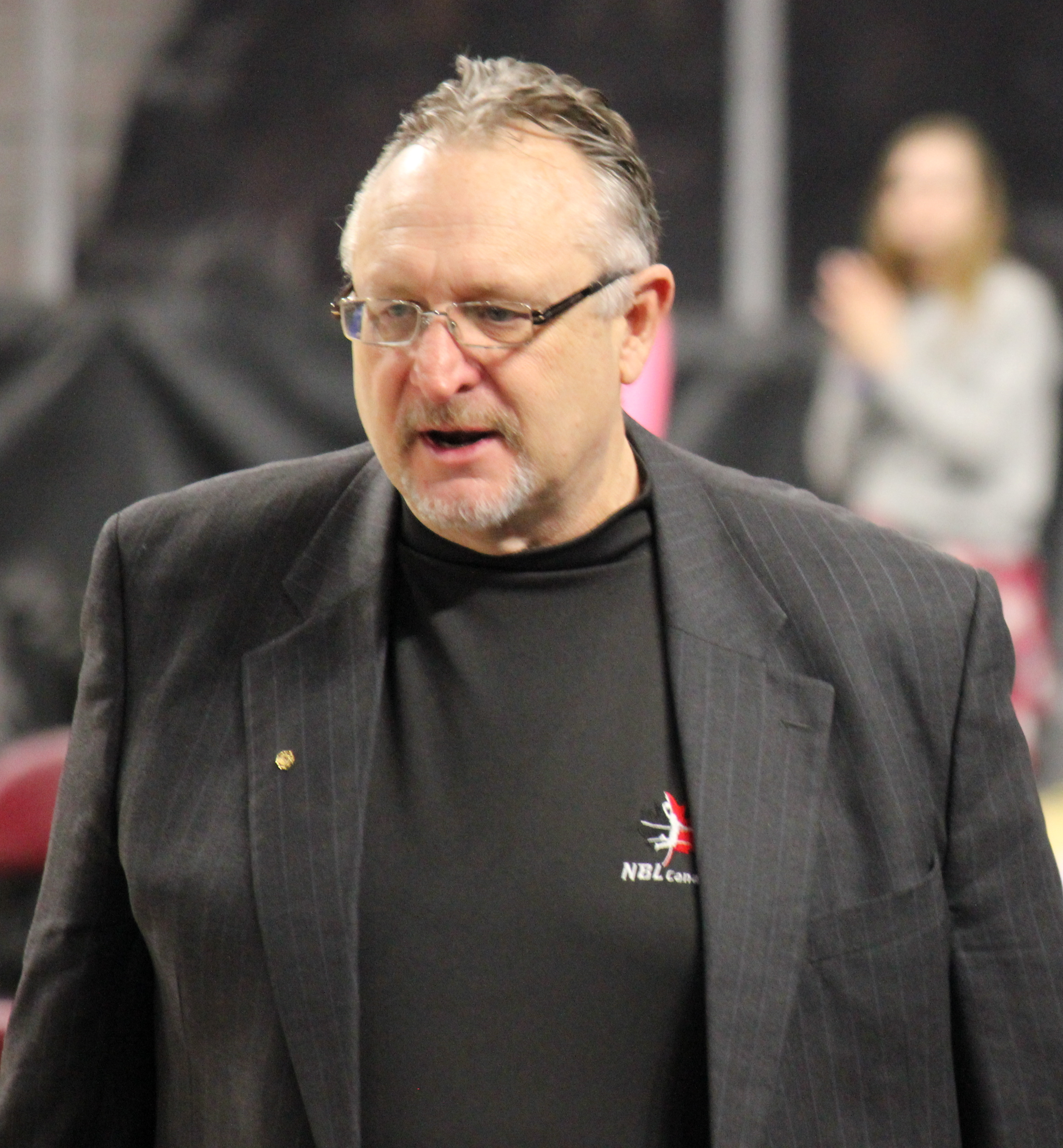

Personal information
- Born: November 24, 1959 (age 66) South Bend, Indiana, U.S.
- Listed height: 6 ft 8 in (2.03 m)
- Listed weight: 202 lb (92 kg)

Career information
- High school: LaSalle (South Bend, Indiana)
- College: Kansas (1978–1982)
- NBA draft: 1982: 2nd round, 28th overall pick
- Drafted by: Cleveland Cavaliers
- Playing career: 1982–1984
- Position: Small forward
- Number: 30
- Coaching career: 2002–2015

Career history

Playing
- 1982–1983: Wyoming Wildcatters
- 1982–1983: Cleveland Cavaliers
- 1983–1984: Albany Patroons

Coaching
- 2002–2013: Bradenton Christian School
- 2013–2015: Brampton A's

Career highlights
- CBA champion (1984); First-team All-Big Eight (1982); Fourth-team Parade All-American (1978); Indiana Mr. Basketball (1978)
- Stats at NBA.com
- Stats at Basketball Reference

David John Magley (born November 24, 1959) is an American former basketball player and coach. He is currently the president of both The Basketball League (TBL) and the Basketball Super League (BSL) after previously serving as commissioner of the National Basketball League of Canada (NBL).

== Early life ==
He played basketball at South Bend LaSalle High School. Following his senior year, Magley was named Indiana Mr. Basketball, beating Randy Wittman and Ted Kitchel for the award, and was selected to the Academic All-State and Parade All American teams.

== NBA and CBA ==
Magley was drafted with the fifth pick in the second round of the 1982 NBA draft by the Cleveland Cavaliers. In his one NBA season, he appeared in fourteen games, recording a total of twelve points and ten rebounds. He also spent several years in the Continental Basketball Association for the Wyoming Wildcatters and Albany Patroons. He won the CBA championship with the Patroons in 1984.

== Coaching ==
Prior to becoming an executive, Magley was head coach of Bradenton Christian School in Bradenton, Florida, for 11 years and then led the Brampton A's for two seasons.

== Commissioner of NBL Canada ==
On May 28, 2015, Magley officially became the commissioner of the National Basketball League of Canada (NBL), succeeding Paul Riley. Several months prior, the league's Board of Directors unanimously voted to end Riley's stint as commissioner. Magley's overseeing of the 2015 NBL Canada Finals brawl helped him get the job.

== President of TBL and BSL ==
After completing his two-year contract as commissioner, he left to become the president and chief operating officer of the upstart North American Premier Basketball League (NAPB) in 2017, which was renamed to The Basketball League (TBL) in 2018 and spawned its sister Basketball Super League (BSL) in 2023.

== Personal life ==
Magley runs both the Basketball League and Basketball Super League with his wife, Evelyn. They have four children together, and their daughter Jennifer is a former professional tennis player and current Chief Brand Officer for both TBL and BSL.

== Career statistics ==
Legend
GP	Games played	GS	Games started	MPG	Minutes per game
FG%	Field goal percentage	3P%	3-point field goal percentage	FT%	Free throw percentage
RPG	Rebounds per game	APG	Assists per game	SPG	Steals per game
BPG	Blocks per game	PPG	Points per game	**Bold**	Career high

=== NBA ===
==== Regular season ====
Year	Team	GP	GS	MPG	FG%	3P%	FT%	RPG	APG	SPG	BPG	PPG
1982–83	Cleveland	14	0	4.0	.250	.000	.500	.7	.1	.1	.0	.9
