= Lewisville Leopards =

American basketball club

- League: The Basketball League
- Founded: 2020
- History: Lewisville Yellow Jackets; 2020; Lewisville Leopards; 2021–
- Arena: Macedonia C.A.R.E. Center
- Location: Lewisville, Texas
- Team colors
- General manager: Dr. Shira Ackerman
- Head coach: Mathis Crowder
- Ownership: Creating Young Minds Academy
- Website: Official website

The Lewisville Leopards are an American professional basketball team based out of Lewisville, Texas, and a member of The Basketball League (TBL).

== History ==
On August 18, 2019, Evelyn Magley, CEO of The Basketball League (TBL), announced a new franchise called the Lewisville Yellow Jackets sponsored and owned by Creating Young Minds located in Lewisville, Texas. Creating Young Minds also operates CYM Academy, a high school and amateur team. The team was renamed the Lewisville Leopards following their inaugural pandemic-shortened season. After sitting out the 2021-2024 TBL seasons. It was announced that the renamed Creating Young Minds Academy would field a team primarily made up of both talented young prospects and veteran players meant to guide the younger prospects.

=== Current roster ===
Note: Flags indicate national team eligibility at FIBA-sanctioned events. Players may hold other non-FIBA nationalities not displayed.

Lewisville Leopards roster
Players
Coaches

Pos.	No.	Nat.	Name	Ht.	Wt.	Age
G		(Sri Lanka)	Sundufu, Moses	6 ft 1 in (1.85 m)	205 lb (93 kg)
F		(United States)	Weiher, Austin	6 ft 8 in (2.03 m)	225 lb (102 kg)	30 – 15 June 1995
G		(United States)	Landshark, Jeff	5 ft 3 in (1.60 m)	180 lb (82 kg)

Head coach

- Mathis Crowder

Legend

- (C) Team captain
- Injured
