= Albany Patroons =

American minor-league basketball team

- Leagues: Continental Basketball Association; 1982–1992, 2005–2009; United States Basketball League; 2006–2007; The Basketball League; 2018–present
- Founded: 1982
- History: Albany Patroons; 1982–1992; Capital Region Pontiacs; 1992–1993; Albany Patroons; 2005–2009; Albany Patroons; 2018–present
- Arena: Washington Avenue Armory
- Location: Albany, New York
- Team colors: gold, green
- Vice-presidents: Michael Corts, Rocco Ricchiuti
- Head coach: Derrick Rowland
- Ownership: Ben Fernandez
- Championships: 3 (1984, 1988, 2019)
- Website: Official website

The Albany Patroons are a professional basketball team that plays in The Basketball League (TBL). Previously, the team competed in the Continental Basketball Association (CBA) and in the United States Basketball League (USBL). The Patroons won CBA championships in 1984 and 1988 as well as a TBL championship in 2019. The team's name derives from patroon, the term for a large landholder in New Netherland, the Dutch colony that once included the Albany region.

Formed in 1982, the Patroons' original home arena was the Washington Avenue Armory, a former New York National Guard armory. The team later moved from this location to MVP Arena, then known as the Knickerbocker Arena. The franchise was renamed the Capital Region Pontiacs in 1992 and was relocated to Connecticut in 1993.

The Patroons rejoined the CBA in 2005. When the CBA ceased its operations in 2009, the team went defunct.

The Patroons became a member of North America Premier Basketball (NAPB) in the 2018 season, once again playing at the Washington Avenue Armory. The league was later renamed to The Basketball League prior to the 2019 season.

== History ==
=== Early years (1982–1993) ===
Future NBA head coach Phil Jackson won his first championship ring as a coach when he guided the Patroons to the 1984 CBA championship. Andre Gaddy was named MVP of the series. Jackson later won NBA championships with the Chicago Bulls and Los Angeles Lakers.

In 1988, the Patroons won a second championship, this time under head coach Bill Musselman. Musselman later coached the Minnesota Timberwolves, and several Patroons from the 1987–88 championship year, including Scott Brooks, Tod Murphy, Tony Campbell, and Sidney Lowe, played on early Timberwolves squads.

In the 1990–91 season, the Patroons completed a 50–6 regular season, winning all 28 home games, with George Karl as head coach. Future NBA players Mario Elie and Vincent Askew were part of that squad.

The Patroons won two CBA championships and five Eastern Division regular season titles. For the 1992–93 season, they were renamed the Capital Region Pontiacs, as the team received sponsorship from local car dealerships. After that season, the franchise was relocated to Connecticut, where it played for 1 1/2 years as the Hartford Hellcats and then 6 1/2 years as the Connecticut Pride before folding in 2001.

The CBA ceased operating and filed for bankruptcy in February 2001.

=== Rebirth (2005–2009) ===
After a decade-long absence, a new Patroons joined the CBA as an expansion team for the 2005–06 season with the original name and colors (gold and kelly green), as well as returning to the old Washington Avenue Armory. Former NBA star Micheal Ray Richardson, who played for the Patroons in the 1987–88 season, became the head coach, while the Patroons' career scoring leader, Derrick Rowland, was named assistant coach. The Patroons finished the season with a 20–28 record, good for third place in the CBA Eastern Conference. Albany qualified for the playoffs, but lost in the first round of the CBA round-robin style playoffs.

On June 14, 2006, the Patroons purchased the rights to a United States Basketball League team, also to be called the Patroons, and play in the Washington Avenue Armory. The team replaced the Pennsylvania ValleyDawgs. After only two years of very low attendance at their home games, the Patroons ended their USBL affiliation on June 19, 2007.

In the 2006–07 season, the Patroons won the CBA American Conference championship and advanced to the best-of-five CBA Finals against the Yakima SunKings. The Patroons lost game one at the Armory. The next day, Coach Richardson was suspended for the rest of the season for firing expletives at hecklers during games and saying in an interview with the Albany Times Union newspaper that Jews are "crafty [because] they are hated worldwide." Without Richardson, the Patroons dropped the next two games of the finals, as the Sun Kings won their second consecutive championship. Three days after the conclusion of the series, it was announced that Richardson would not return. He was replaced by Vincent Askew.

On July 10, 2007, former Patroon Jamario Moon signed a two-year contract with the Toronto Raptors. Moon had a strong rookie campaign, averaging 8.5 points and 6.2 rebounds per game.

Both the Patroons and the CBA folded after the 2009 season, citing the economic recession.

=== North American Premier Basketball/The Basketball League (2018–present) ===
On August 30, 2017, it was announced that the Patroons would return to the Washington Avenue Armory in January 2018. The new team became one of the inaugural members of North American Premier Basketball (NAPB).

The Patroons' roster included former NBA players Maurice Taylor, Smush Parker, and Jamario Moon. After the first season, the NAPB rebranded as The Basketball League (TBL).

On May 3, 2019, the Patroons defeated the Yakima SunKings in the third game of a best-of-three series to win the TBL championship.

On September 4, 2019, the ownership of the Patroons was transferred to Dr. Tim Maggs for the 2020 season. They started the 2020 season at 6-3 before the season was canceled due to the COVID-19 pandemic. The Patroons opted to sit out the 2021 season as well. The Washington Avenue Armory was being used as a vaccination site, and the team would have had to play the season without fans in attendance in any case. Maggs considered temporarily moving to the Times Union Center, but decided against it after recalling how the CBA Patroons saw their attendance figures fall through the floor when they played there.

Former UAlbany Basketball Coach and Albany Legend Will Brown was named the Head Coach and General Manager of the Patroons. He led UAlbany to 5 America East Championships and is a former America East Coach of the Year. On December 7, 2021, Will Brown announced his coaching staff of Brian Beaury, Julie McBride and Marc Rybczyk for the 2022 season.

In the 2022 season, the Patroons finished with a league best 21-3 record in the regular season. Albany would clinch the TBL's East Region, but would ultimately lose the Championship to the Shreveport Mavericks in a best-of-three series.

== Current roster ==
Albany Patroons roster
Players
Coaches

Pos.	No.	Nat.	Name	Ht.	Wt.	Age
SG	0	(United States)	Rowland, Jr., Derrick	6 ft 3 in (1.91 m)	190 lb (86 kg)	27 – 6 July 1998
SG	1	(United States)	Carter, La'Darius	6 ft 3 in (1.91 m)	191 lb (87 kg)	26 – 4 August 1999
SG	2	(United States)	Brown, Jr., Sidney	5 ft 10 in (1.78 m)	160.6 lb (72.8 kg)	26 – 7 July 1999
SG	3	(United States)	Wyche, Trevis	6 ft 1 in (1.85 m)	176 lb (80 kg)	30 – 25 April 1995
SF	5	(United States)	Williams, Joshua	6 ft 7 in (2.01 m)	209 lb (95 kg)	31 – 26 December 1994
SG	12	(United States)	Hood, Jr., Jamil	6 ft 2 in (1.88 m)	189.2 lb (85.8 kg)	29 – 18 October 1996
SG	22	(United States)	McRae, Montell	6 ft 10 in (2.08 m)	198 lb (90 kg)	30 – 25 January 1996
SG	32	(Canada)	Dyson III, Edward	6 ft 4 in (1.93 m)	189 lb (86 kg)	34 – 9 April 1992
SG	33	(Canada)	Arrington, Arsenio	6 ft 9 in (2.06 m)	180 lb (82 kg)	29 – 12 June 1996
G/F	40	(United States)	Malone, Juwan	6 ft 4 in (1.93 m)	180 lb (82 kg)	28 – 1 June 1997
SG	55	(United States)	Joseph, Jamarr	6 ft 3 in (1.91 m)		29 – 31 March 1997
SG		(United States)	Cincy, Malik	6 ft 4 in (1.93 m)	194 lb (88 kg)	28 – 25 May 1997
PF/C		(United States)	Merchant, Marcus	6 ft 9 in (2.06 m)	220 lb (100 kg)	25 – 23 August 2000

Head coach

- (United States) Derrick Rowland

Assistant coach(es)

- (United States) Michael Shewmaker

Legend

- (C) Team captain
- Injured

- Roster
- Transactions
Updated: April 3, 2024

== Alumni ==
Former Albany Patroons players who went on to play in the National Basketball Association include Vincent Askew, Scott Brooks, Mario Elie, Jamario Moon, Scott Roth. and Xavier Moon.

Former Patroons players and/or coaches who went on to coach in the National Basketball Association include Scott Brooks, Rick Carlisle, Phil Jackson, George Karl, Derrick Rowland, Sidney Lowe, Bill Musselman, Kenny Natt, Scott Roth, and Terry Stotts.

Former Patroons players who later coached the Patroons include Micheal Ray Richardson and Derrick Rowland.

== Season-by-season history ==
Year	League	GP	W	L	Pct.	Reg. season	Playoffs
1982/83	CBA	44	16	28	.364	4th, Eastern	did not qualify
1983/84	CBA	44	25	19	.568	2nd, Eastern	Won Eastern Division Semi Finals 3-2 Vs Bay State Bombardier, Won Eastern Division Finals 3–1 Vs Puerto Rico Coquis, Won CBA Championship 4–1 Vs Wyoming Wildcatters
1984/85	CBA	48	34	14	.708	1st, Eastern	Won Eastern Division Semi Finals 3–2 Vs Toronto Tornados, Lost Eastern Division Finals 3–2 Vs Tampa Bay Thrillers
1985/86	CBA	48	24	24	.500	4th, Eastern	Lost Eastern Division Semifinals 4–3 Vs Tampa Bay Thrillers
1986/87	CBA	48	26	22	.542	2nd, Eastern	Won Eastern Division Semi Finals 4–0 Vs Jacksonville Jets, Lost Eastern Division Finals 4–0 Vs Rapid City Thrillers
1987/88	CBA	54	48	6	.889	1st, Eastern	Won Eastern Division Semi Finals 4–1 Vs Savannah Spirits, Won Eastern Division Finals 4–0 Vs Pensacola Tornados, Won CBA Championship 4–3 Vs Wyoming Wildcatters
1988/89	CBA	54	36	18	.667	1st, Eastern	Lost Eastern Division Semifinals 4–2 Vs Wichita Falls Texans
1989/90	CBA	56	41	15	.732	1st, American Eastern	Won American Conference Semi Finals 3–2 Vs Pensacola Tornados, Lost American Conference Finals 4–3 Vs La Crosse Catbirds
1990/91	CBA	56	50	6	.893	1st, National Eastern	Won National Conference First Round 3–2 Vs Grand Rapids Hornets, Lost National Conference Finals 4–2 Vs Wichita Falls Texans
1991/92	CBA	56	24	32	.429	3rd, American Eastern	Lost American Conference 1st Round Shootout 131–122 Vs Birmingham Bandits
Capital Region Pontiacs
1992/93	CBA	56	28	28	.500	2nd, American Eastern	did not qualify
Albany Patroons
2005/06	CBA	48	20	28	.417	3rd, Eastern	Placed 2nd in Eastern Round Robin
2006	USBL	29	2	27	.068	4th, Eastern	Lost First Round 97–92 to Nebraska Cranes
2006/07	CBA	48	30	18	.625	1st, American Eastern	Lost CBA Finals 3–0 VsYakima SunKings
2007	USBL	21	15	6	.714	2nd	Withdrew from league
2008	CBA	48	21	27	.438	4th, Eastern	did not qualify
2009	CBA	20	13	7	.650	2nd	Lost CBA Finals 2–1 Vs Lawton-Fort Sill Cavalry
2018	NAPBL	29	19	10	.655	2nd	Won Semi Finals 2–0 Vs Ohio Bootleggers, Lost NAPBL Finals 2–0 Vs Yakima SunKings
2019	TBL	27	16	11	.593	4th	Won East division Semi Finals 2–1 Vs Raleigh Firebirds, Won TBL Championship 2–1 Vs Yakima SunKings
2020	TBL	9	6	3	.667	5th	No playoffs held due to COVID-19 pandemic
2021	TBL	–	–	–	–	Opted out of season due to COVID-19 pandemic	
2022	TBL	23	20	3	.870	1st Northeast	Won Northeast Division Finals 2–1 Vs Atlantic City Gambits, Won Eastern Conference Finals 2–0 Vs Huntsville Hurricanes, Won TBL Semi Finals 2–1 Vs Kokomo BobKats, Lost TBL Finals 2–1 Vs Shreveport Mavericks
2023	TBL	24	20	4	.833	5th	Won Northeast Division Final 2–0 Vs Atlantic City Gambits, Won Eastern Conference Finals 2–0 Vs Newfoundland Rogues, Lost TBL Semi Finals 2–1 Vs St Louis Griffins
2024	TBL	23	17	6	.739	3rd Atlantic Northeast	Won Atlantic Northeast Play in round 131–120 Vs Reading Rebels, Won East round of 16 2–0 Fredrick Flying Cows, Lost Quarter Finals 2–1 Vs Raleigh Firebirds
