= Syracuse Stallions =

- League: The Basketball League
- Founded: 2017
- Folded: 2023
- History: Syracuse Stallions; 2018–2023
- Arena: Liverpool High School
- Location: Syracuse, New York
- Team colors
- President: Paul Galvin
- General manager: Josh Winans
- Head coach: Patrick Beilein
- Ownership: Paul Galvin
- Championships: 2019 ABA Northeast Region Champions, 2021 TBL Eastern Conference Champions
- Website: Official website
Home	Away

The Syracuse Stallions were a professional basketball team in Syracuse, New York, and played in both the American Basketball Association (ABA) and The Basketball League (TBL).

== History ==
The Syracuse Stallions were founded in 2017 by founding majority member Jim Evans, as well as minority owners Mike Sugamosto and Josh Winans. The team joined the semiprofessional American Basketball Association for the 2018 season. The team had two successful seasons, including championship wins. and decided to become a professional basketball team.

On May 1, 2020, Evelyn Magley, CEO of The Basketball League (TBL), announced the Stallions were approved to join the league for the 2021 season.

On August 25, 2021, Nick Peroli, the Stallions head coach announced he would step down from that position and transition to an ownership role of the team. On September 1, 2021, the Syracuse Stallions named Patrick Beilein the new head coach of the team.

== Current roster ==
Syracuse Stallions roster
Players	Coaches
Pos. / No. / Nat. / Name / Ht. / Wt. / Age	Head coach: (United States) Patrick Beilein; Assistant coach(es): (United States) Ryan Blackwell; Legend: (C) Team captain; Injured; Roster
