= Carolina Firebirds =

- League: The Basketball League
- Founded: 2018
- History: Raleigh Firebirds; 2019–2026; Carolina Firebirds; 2026–present
- Arena: St. Augustine's University
- Location: Raleigh, North Carolina
- General manager: Chris Lightner
- Head coach: Antonio Davis
- Ownership: Pro Basketball Raleigh, LLC
Home	Away	Third

The Carolina Firebirds formally known as the Raleigh Firebirds are an American professional basketball team based in Raleigh, North Carolina, and a member of The Basketball League (TBL). For the 2025 season, their home games are played at St. Augustine's University and Antonio Davis serves as head coach. The Firebirds have played in The Basketball League since 2019, with a spanning season from March to June. During their first inaugural season, the team went 13-1 at home, and reached the TBL Eastern Conference Finals. The Firebirds also had the number one overall pick in the 2019 TBL Draft, and selected Julian Harris. Harris would win Rookie of the Year, and go on to play basketball overseas.

== History ==
On February 25, 2018, Dave Magley, owner of The Basketball League (TBL), stated that Raleigh, North Carolina, was approved as a basketball franchise for the upcoming 2019 season. On July 27, 2018, the team was announced as the Raleigh Firebirds. Raleigh previously hosted the Raleigh Cougars from 1997 to 1999 in the United States Basketball League.

The Firebirds first season was played during 2019, and they traveled all over the country. During the 14 games they played at home, the team went 13-1, and eventually lost in the TBL Eastern Conference Finals. They were four points from playing in the TBL Finals. On July 1, 2026 the team rebranded as the ''' Carolina Firebirds'''

== Current roster ==
Raleigh Firebirds roster
Players
Coaches

Pos.	No.	Nat.	Name	Ht.	Wt.	Age
SG	2	(United States)	Collins, Kenny	6 ft 5 in (1.96 m)
PG	10	(United States)	Abdullah, Ahmad	6 ft 1 in (1.85 m)
SG	3	(United States)	Antoine, Daequon	6 ft 3 in (1.91 m)
PG	15	(United States)	Thomas, DJ	5 ft 7 in (1.70 m)
SF	24	(United States)	Dance, Shaq	6 ft 6 in (1.98 m)
SG	1	(United States)	Palmer, Dreko	6 ft 6 in (1.98 m)
F	4	(United States)	Greene, Donté	6 ft 11 in (2.11 m)
C	45	(United States)	Gamble, Julian	6 ft 10 in (2.08 m)
SG	7	(United States)	Pope, Jeremiah	6 ft 5 in (1.96 m)
SF	12	(United States)	Sutton, Dominique	6 ft 6 in (1.98 m)

Head coach

Kenny Collins

Assistant coach(es)

Mitch Jeffries

Legend

- (C) Team captain
- Injured

- Roster
