= The Basketball League =

North American basketball league

The Basketball League (TBL)
- Current season, competition or edition: 2026 TBL season
- Formerly: North America Premier Basketball
- Sport: Basketball
- Founded: 2017; 9 years ago
- First season: 2018
- Owners: Dave Magley; Evelyn Magley
- CEO: Evelyn Magley
- President: Dave Magley
- Commissioner: Carlnel Wiley
- Motto: Where the spirit of the game lives
- No. of teams: 40
- Countries: United States; Canada
- Continent: North America
- Most recent champion: Potawatomi Fire (4th title)
- Most titles: Potawatomi Fire (4)
- Broadcaster: TBL TV
- Website: thebasketballleague.net

The Basketball League (TBL), formerly North America Premier Basketball (NAPB), is a professional basketball league. The league began operating in North America in 2018 with eight teams, and has since expanded.

TBL's regular season runs from February through May, and their teams engage in interleague play with franchises of the Basketball Super League (BSL).

== History ==
=== Launch as NAPB, 2017–2018 ===
In July 2017, Dave Magley and Severko Hrywnak announced the formation of North America Premier Basketball (NAPB). Magley previously served as commissioner for the National Basketball League of Canada (NBLC), and Hrywnak was co-founder of the Premier Basketball League (PBL).

The league launched its inaugural 2018 season with eight teams: Albany Patroons, Kansas City Tornados, Kentucky Thoroughbreds, Nevada Desert Dogs, Ohio Cardinals, Rochester Razorsharks, Vancouver Knights, and the Yakima SunKings. The Yakima SunKings defeated the Albany Patroons in a best-of-three series to become inaugural NAPB champions.

=== Magley purchase and rebranding, 2018–2021 ===
After the first season, Dave Magley and his wife Evelyn acquired the league as sole owners, and rebranded as The Basketball League (TBL). Paul Mokeski was named commissioner of the league for its 2019 season, which commenced with ten teams. The league's second season was ended prematurely, as many teams were struggling financially. In a rematch from the prior year, the Albany Patroons defeated the Yakima SunKings in a best-of-three series to become TBL champions. Paul Woolpert was fired as Yakima's head coach prior to the final game, as he had protested the team owner refusing to pay for his coaching staff's flights to Albany.

The 2020 season began with twelve teams, but ended prematurely with no playoffs held due to the COVID-19 pandemic. Carlnel Wiley replaced Paul Mokeski as league commissioner prior to this season. The Indy Express were declared champions.

Twenty-nine teams played during the 2021 season, with the Enid Outlaws defeating the Syracuse Stallions in a best-of-three series to capture the league championship.

=== NBLC dissolution and BSL formation, 2022–2024 ===
We are a showcase league, trying to provide players with opportunities. We don’t have buyout clauses, so players can leave if they find another opportunity. We provide video and stats, which is important for players who want to go overseas, because those are the two things that you need to get a chance.

— Evelyn Magley, CEO

National Basketball League of Canada (NBLC) teams engaged in interleague play with TBL franchises during the 2022 season, including the 2022 TBL All-Star Game. Forty-four teams competed that season, and the Shreveport Mavericks defeated the Albany Patroons in a best-of-three series to become TBL champions.

Forty-nine teams played during the 2023 season, with the Potawatomi Fire defeating the St. Louis Griffins in their best-of-three series to become TBL champions.

After the dissolution of NBLC following their 2022–23 season, Dave Magley announced the formation of the Basketball Super League (BSL), whose teams would engage in interleague play with TBL franchises beginning in 2024. The 2024 season saw thirty-nine teams compete, with the Potawatomi Fire once again defeating the St. Louis Griffin in a best-of-three series to win the TBL championship.

=== Defections to USBL and 94x50, 2025–present ===
Following the 2025 season, thirteen TBL teams left to form two rival leagues. The Capital Seahawks, Frederick Flying Cows, Jersey Shore Breaks, New York Phoenix, Reading Rebels, San Diego Sharks, and Virginia Valley Vipers left to form the 94x50 League. The Bakersfield Majestics, Los Angeles Blue Waves, Salem Capitals, Seattle SuperHawks, and Vancouver Volcanoes left to form the United States Basketball League. With their crosstown rival New York Phoenix gone to 94x50 League and no local TBL teams remaining, the Albany Patroons chose to leave the league and go on hiatus.

The departing owners likened the TBL to a pyramid scheme, saying the Magley family had too much control.

The current entry fee for a TBL franchise is $600,000, payable on installment, along with a $10,000 annual fee for officiating. Owners are expected to have annual operating budgets of $200,000 to $300,000, and are entitled to receive 50% of the league's sponsorship earnings through revenue sharing.

== Teams ==
Base locations of USA teams in The Basketball League. Colors represent conference alignment as of the 2026 season.

=== Current teams ===
The Basketball League teams
Division	Team	City	Arena	Capacity	Founded	Joined	Head coach
Central
Central	ADS Sentinels	Converse, Texas	ADS Sportsplex	TBA	2025	2026	Brian Benjamin
Central	Creating Young Minds Leopards	Little Elm, Texas	Herschel Zellars Early Childhood Learning Center	TBA			Mathis Crowder
Central	Enid Outlaws	Enid, Oklahoma	Stride Bank Center	5,000	2020	2021	Burshaud Williams
Central	Little Rock Lightning	Little Rock, Arkansas	Hall High School	1,700	2020	2021	Brian Rowsom
Central	Muskogee Skykings	Muskogee, Oklahoma	Ron D. Milam Gymnasium	TBA	2020	2024	Lenny Bert
Central	Potawatomi Fire	Shawnee, Oklahoma	FireLake Arena	5,000	2021	2022	Mark Dannhoff
Central	Dallas Stampede	Dallas, Texas	Singing Hills Center	TBA	2025	2026	Ronell Murray
Mid Atlantic
Mid Atlantic	Prince William Heat	Haymarket, Virginia	Battlefield High School	TBA	2025	2026	William McLaughlin
Mid Atlantic	DMV Soldiers	Charles County, Maryland	St. Charles High School	2,000	2024	2026	Byron Mouton
Mid Atlantic	First State Misfits	Frankford, Delaware	The Factory Sports Inc	TBA	2025	2026	Andre Mathews
Mid Atlantic	Lehigh Valley Flight	Allentown, Pennsylvania	Lower Macungie Community Center	TBA	2025	2026	Anthony Jenkins
Mid Atlantic	New England Kraken	Boston, Massachusetts	Kroc Center	1,135	2025	2026	Jason Lombard
Mid Atlantic	Tri-State Admirals	Elizabeth, New Jersey	Saint Elizabeth University	420	2020	2020	Daniel Jacob
Midwest
Midwest	Columbus Wizards	Westerville, Ohio	Rike Center	3,100	2023 (in the ABA)	2026	Bradley Rader
Midwest	Glass City Wranglers	Toledo, Ohio	Glass City Center	1,500	2024	2025	Ben Scofield
Midwest	Grove City Whitetails	Grove City, Ohio	Central Crossing High School	3,100	2025	2026	Raevonne Blue
Midwest	Lake County Legacy	Lake County, Illinois	Waukegan High School	TBA	2024	2025	Henry French
Midwest	Hamilton County Huskers	Arcadia, Indiana	SAC Arena	3,000	2025	2026	Doug Mitchell
Midwest	St. Louis Griffins	St. Louis, Missouri	Normandy High School; Saint Louis Priory School	3,000 TBA	2022	2023	Nate Griffin
Midwest	Windy City Kings	Chicago	TBD	TBA	2026	2027	
South Atlantic
South Atlantic	TBL ATL	Atlanta Georgia	TBD		2026	2027	
South Atlantic	Fayetteville Liberty	Fayetteville, North Carolina	Crown Coliseum	10,000	2024	2026	Don Gardner
South Atlantic	Jacksonville 95ers	Jacksonville, Florida	First Coast High School	1,500	2023	2024	Kevin Waters
South Atlantic	Kissimmee Lambs	Kissimmee, Florida	Poinciana High School	3,100	2023 (in the ABA)	2026	Edgar Vasquez
South Atlantic	Carolina Firebirds	Raleigh, North Carolina	St. Augustine's University	750	2018	2019	Kenny Collins
South Atlantic	Tampa Bay Titans	Tampa, Florida	Tampa Preparatory School	TBA	2020	2025	Khali Daley
West	4 Bears Roar	New Town, North Dakota	4 Bears Casino Event Center	1,500	2025	2026	Wayne Casey
West	GC Red Tails	Mattawa, Washington	Wahluke High School	1.800	2025	2026	Larry Stepter
West	Great Falls Electric	Great Falls, Montana	Bison Fieldhouse	3,600	2023	2024	Steve Keller
West	Tri Cities Sun Devils	Pasco, Washington	HAPO Center	5,000	2025	2026	Marcus Benavidez
West	Willamette Valley Jaguars	Willamette Valley, Oregon	Corvallis High School; Crescent Valley High School; McArthur Court	1,050; 1,500; 9,087	2023	2024	John Tyson

== Affiliate teams ==
The following teams play select 2026 TBL games to fill out the schedule.

The Basketball League teams
Team	City	Arena	Capacity	Founded	Joined	Head coach
Florida Flight	Davie, Florida	Raiders Center	TBA	2010 (in the FBA)	2026	Mark King
Mesquite Desert Dogs	Mesquite, Nevada	travel team	n/a	2019	2026	Carnel Wiley
Memphis Lions	Memphis, Tennessee	travel team	n/a	2021 (in the MBL)	2026	Larry Stepter
Mesa Monsoons	Chandler, Arizona Mesa, Arizona	Paragon Charter Academy Mesa Community College	600 2,000	2025	2026	Brannon Gates

== Seasons ==
Overview of The Basketball League seasons
Season	Regular season champion	Regular season MVP	Playoff champion	Playoff runner-up	Playoff MVP
2018	Yakima SunKings	Edwin Ubiles (Albany)	Yakima SunKings	Albany Patroons	Renaldo Major
2019	Yakima SunKings	Robert Duncan (Yakima)	Albany Patroons	Yakima SunKings	Shadell Millinghaus
2020	Indy Express*	Corey Taite (Tri-State)	Season canceled due to COVID-19 pandemic		
2021	Enid Outlaws	Chance Comanche (Enid)	Enid Outlaws	Syracuse Stallions	Chance Comanche
2022	Shreveport Mavericks	Deshawn Munson (Potawatomi)	Shreveport Mavericks	Albany Patroons	PJ Meyers
2023	Potawatomi Fire	Chris Darrington (Glass City)	Potawatomi Fire	St. Louis Griffins	Daylon Guy and Deshawn Munson
2024	Potawatomi Fire	Daylon Guy (Potawatomi)	Potawatomi Fire	St. Louis Griffins	Deshawn Munson
2025	Frederick Flying Cows	Javon Adams (Frederick) and Daylon Guy (Potawatomi)	Potawatomi Fire	Capital Seahawks	Ricardo Artis II
2026	Potawatomi Fire		Potawatomi Fire	Tri-City Tide	Jahmal McMurray

^{*} Shortened season due to the COVID-19 pandemic, The Indy Express had the best overall record at the time of cancellation.
