= Omaha Mavericks men's basketball statistical leaders =

The Omaha Mavericks men's basketball statistical leaders are individual statistical leaders of the Omaha Mavericks men's basketball program in various categories, including points, assists, blocks, rebounds, and steals. Within those areas, the lists identify single-game, single-season, and career leaders. The Mavericks represent the University of Nebraska Omaha in the NCAA Division I Summit League.

Omaha began competing in intercollegiate basketball in 1910. However, the school's record book does not generally list records from before the 1950s, as records from before this period are often incomplete and inconsistent. Since scoring was much lower in this era, and teams played much fewer games during a typical season, it is likely that few or no players from this era would appear on these lists anyway.

An added complication in statistical recording is that Omaha did not begin playing in Division I until the 2012–13 season, having previously been in Division II. This is significant because the NCAA did not officially record assists, blocks, and steals in D-II until several years after it began doing so in D-I. The NCAA briefly recorded assists as a statistic in 1950–51 and 1951–52, before the NCAA first split into divisions in 1956. However, after 1952, assists were not officially recorded again in D-I until the 1983–84 season. Blocks and steals were first officially recorded in D-I in the 1985–86 season. By contrast, assists were not officially recorded in D-II until 1988–89, and blocks and steals were not officially recorded in that division until 1992–93. Nonetheless, Omaha's record books includes players in these stats before these seasons. These lists are updated through the end of the 2020–21 season.

== Scoring ==
Career
Rk	Player	Points	Seasons
1	Dean Thompson Jr.	1,816	1980–81 1981–82 1982–83 1983–84
2	Mitch Albers	1,790	2007–08 2008–09 2010–11 2011–12
3	Dennis Forrest	1,660	1973–74 1974–75 1975–76 1976–77
4	Zach Jackson	1,570	2015–16 2016–17 2017–18 2018–19
5	Michael Jenkins	1,556	2005–06 2006–07 2007–08 2008–09
6	Frankie Fidler	1,505	2021–22 2022–23 2023–24
7	CJ Carter	1,502	2011–12 2012–13 2013–14 2014–15
8	Phil Cartwright	1,457	1988–89 1989–90 1990–91 1991–92
9	Marquel Sutton	1,388	2022–23 2023–24 2024–25
10	Mike Simons	1,387	1996–97 1997–98 1998–99 1999–00

Season
Rk	Player	Points	Season
1	Dennis Forrest	722	1976–77
2	Frankie Fidler	664	2023–24
3	Marquel Sutton	662	2024–25
4	Art Allen	646	1969–70
5	Calvin Forrest	602	1972–73
6	Tyler Bullock	588	2009–10
7	Zach Jackson	578	2018–19
8	Devin Patterson	575	2015–16
9	Jake White	552	2015–16
10	Marcus Tyus	547	2016–17
	Zach Jackson	547	2017–18

Single game
Rk	Player	Points	Season	Opponent
1	Stan Schaetzle	46	1956–57	vs. Wayne State
2	CJ Carter	45	2014–15	IUPUI
3	Art Allen	42	1969–70	Adams State
4	Art Allen	39	1969–70	Buena Vista
5	Devin Patterson	38	2015–16	Montana State
	Paul Djobet	38	2025–26	North Dakota State
7	Calvin Kapels	37	2005–06	St. Cloud State
	Devin Patterson	37	2015–16	Duquesne
	Marcus Tyus	37	2016–17	Montana State
10	Dennis Forrest	36	1976–77	UMKC
	Marquel Sutton	36	2024–25	South Dakota

== Rebounds ==
Career
Rk	Player	Rebounds	Seasons
1	John Skokan	1,022	1992–93 1993–94 1994–95 1995–96
2	Phil Cartwright	946	1988–89 1989–90 1990–91 1991–92
3	Matt Pile	916	2017–18 2018–19 2019–20 2020–21
4	Larry Villnow	775	1961–62 1962–63 1963–64 1964–65
5	Nate McMorris	757	1974–75 1975–76 1976–77 1977–78
6	Ryan Curtis	717	2002–03 2003–04 2004–05 2005–06
7	Dennis Browne	683	1965–66 1966–67
8	Pat Roehrig	640	1971–72 1972–73 1973–74 1974–75
9	Marquel Sutton	638	2022–23 2023–24 2024–25
10	Terry Sodawasser	625	1981–82 1982–83 1983–84 1984–85

Season
Rk	Player	Rebounds	Season
1	Dennis Browne	392	1966–67
2	Phil Cartwright	353	1991–92
3	Matt Pile	321	2019–20
4	Merlin Renner	303	1971–72
5	John Skokan	292	1994–95
6	Dennis Browne	291	1965–66
7	John Skokan	289	1995–96
8	John Funke	280	1972–73
	Pat Roehrig	280	1974–75
10	Marquel Sutton	275	2024–25

Single game
Rk	Player	Rebounds	Season	Opponent
1	Nate McMorris	25	1975–76	Nebraska-Kearney
2	Don Williams	24	1967–68	Morningside
3	Dennis Browne	23	1966–67	Fort Hays State
	John Skokan	23	1994–95	North Dakota
	John Skokan	23	1995–96	St. Cloud State
6	Terry Sodawasser	21	1983–84	Midland
	Al Lainio	21	2000–01	Peru State
	Mike Rostampour	21	2013–14	North Dakota
	Matt Pile	21	2019–20	Oral Roberts
10	Phil Cartwright	20	1991–92	Northern Colorado

== Assists ==
Career
Rk	Player	Assists	Seasons
1	Dwayne King	558	1982–83 1983–84 1984–85 1985–86
2	Andrew Bridger	506	2006–07 2007–08 2008–09 2009–10
3	Derrick Jackson	463	1976–77 1977–78 1978–79 1979–80
4	Dean Thompson Jr.	447	1980–81 1981–82 1982–83 1983–84
5	Calvin Kapels	420	2002–03 2003–04 2004–05 2005–06
6	Vernon Manning	406	1978–79 1979–80 1980–81 1981–82
7	Tra-Deon Hollins	405	2015–16 2016–17
8	JJ White	363	2022–23 2023–24 2024–25
9	CJ Carter	343	2011–12 2012–13 2013–14 2014–15
10	Thad Mott	328	1988–89 1989–90 1990–91 1991–92

Season
Rk	Player	Assists	Season
1	Paul Potter	215	1976–77
2	Tra-Deon Hollins	209	2016–17
3	Tra-Deon Hollins	196	2015–16
4	Andrew Bridger	193	2009–10
5	Dwayne King	185	1985–86
6	Leo Grimes	175	1975–76
7	Andrew Bridger	158	2007–08
8	Dwayne King	153	1984–85
9	Dean Thompson Jr.	147	1983–84
10	JJ White	140	2024–25

Single game
Rk	Player	Assists	Season	Opponent
1	Paul Potter	17	1976–77	Wayne State
2	Andrew Bridger	16	2009–10	Missouri Southern
3	Andrew Bridger	13	2009–10	Missouri Western
4	Tra-Deon Hollins	13	2015–16	Fort Wayne
5	Andrew Bridger	12	2009–10	Chadron State
6	Andrew Bridger	11	2009–10	Doane
	Caleb Steffensmeier	11	2011–12	Fort Wayne
	Tra-Deon Hollins	11	2015–16	Eastern Illinois
	Tra-Deon Hollins	11	2016–17	Iowa
	Grant Stubblefield	11	2025–26	North Dakota State

== Steals ==
Career
Rk	Player	Steals	Seasons
1	Tra-Deon Hollins	235	2015–16 2016–17
2	Calvin Kapels	191	2002–03 2003–04 2004–05 2005–06
3	Dwayne King	186	1982–83 1983–84 1984–85 1985–86
4	Mike Simons	183	1996–97 1997–98 1998–99 1999–00
5	Devin Patterson	175	2013–14 2014–15 2015–16
6	Dean Thompson Jr.	174	1980–81 1981–82 1982–83 1983–84
7	Seth Nelson	166	1999–00 2000–01 2001–02 2002–03
8	Andrew Bridger	158	2006–07 2007–08 2008–09 2009–10
9	Vernon Manning	155	1978–79 1979–80 1980–81 1981–82
10	CJ Carter	149	2011–12 2012–13 2013–14 2014–15

Season
Rk	Player	Steals	Season
1	Tra-Deon Hollins	127	2015–16
2	Tra-Deon Hollins	108	2016–17
3	Vernon Manning	80	1981–82
4	Bryan Leach	66	1987–88
5	Calvin Kapels	63	2005–06
6	Trent Neal	62	1989–90
	Mike Simons	62	1999–00
8	Dean Thompson Jr.	61	1982–83
9	Devin Patterson	59	2014–15
	Devin Patterson	59	2015–16

Single game
Rk	Player	Steals	Season	Opponent
1	Andrew Bridger	8	2007–08	Nebraska-Kearney

== Blocks ==
Career
Rk	Player	Blocks	Seasons
1	John Skokan	185	1992–93 1993–94 1994–95 1995–96
2	Adam Wetzel	150	2001–02 2002–03
3	Phil Cartwright	143	1988–89 1989–90 1990–91 1991–92
4	Matt Pile	139	2017–18 2018–19 2019–20 2020–21
5	Frank Cypress	94	1993–94 1994–95
6	Tre'Shawn Thurman	91	2014–15 2015–16 2016–17
7	Levy Jones	83	2003–04 2004–05
8	Matt Hagerbaumer	79	2010–11 2011–12 2012–13 2013–14
9	Terry Henderson	69	1989–90 1990–91 1991–92
	John Karhoff	69	2010–11 2011–12 2012–13 2013–14

Season
Rk	Player	Blocks	Season
1	Adam Wetzel	90	2001–02
2	John Skokan	64	1995–96
3	Adam Wetzel	60	2002–03
4	John Skokan	59	1994–95
5	Phil Cartwright	51	1991–92
6	Matt Pile	49	2019–20
7	Phil Cartwright	44	1989–90
8	Levy Jones	43	2004–05
9	Levy Jones	40	2003–04
10	Jerry Bennett	37	2007–08

Single game
Rk	Player	Blocks	Season	Opponent
1	John Skokan	9	1994–95	South Dakota State
2	Adam Wetzel	6	2001–02	North Dakota State
	Adam Wetzel	6	2002–03	Hastings College
	Matt Pile	6	2017–18	Denver
5	Adam Wetzel	5	2001–02	St. Cloud State
	Adam Wetzel	5	2002–03	Rockhurst
	Adam Wetzel	5	2002–03	Mesa State
	Adam Wetzel	5	2002–03	Nebraska-Kearney
	Adam Wetzel	5	2002–03	South Dakota State
	Adam Wetzel	5	2002–03	South Dakota
	Gabe Zwiener	5	2005–06	Nebraska-Kearney
	Tre'Shawn Thurman	5	2014–15	Nevada
	Tre'Shawn Thurman	5	2015–16	South Dakota
	Mitch Hahn	5	2016–17	Buena Vista
