= List of 2019–20 NBA season transactions =

This is a list of transactions that have taken place during the 2019 NBA off-season and the 2019–20 NBA season.

== Retirement ==
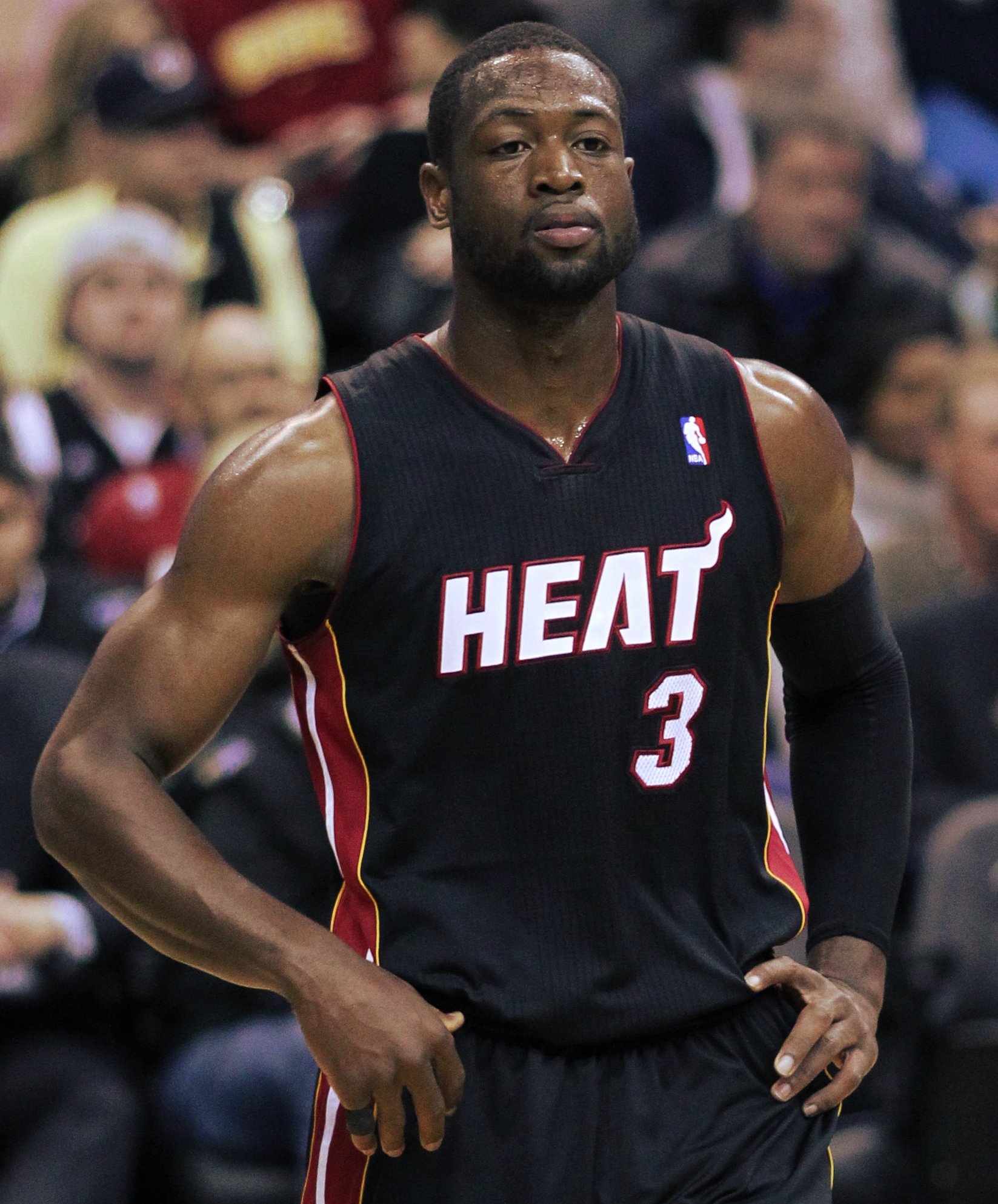
Dwyane Wade with the Miami Heat

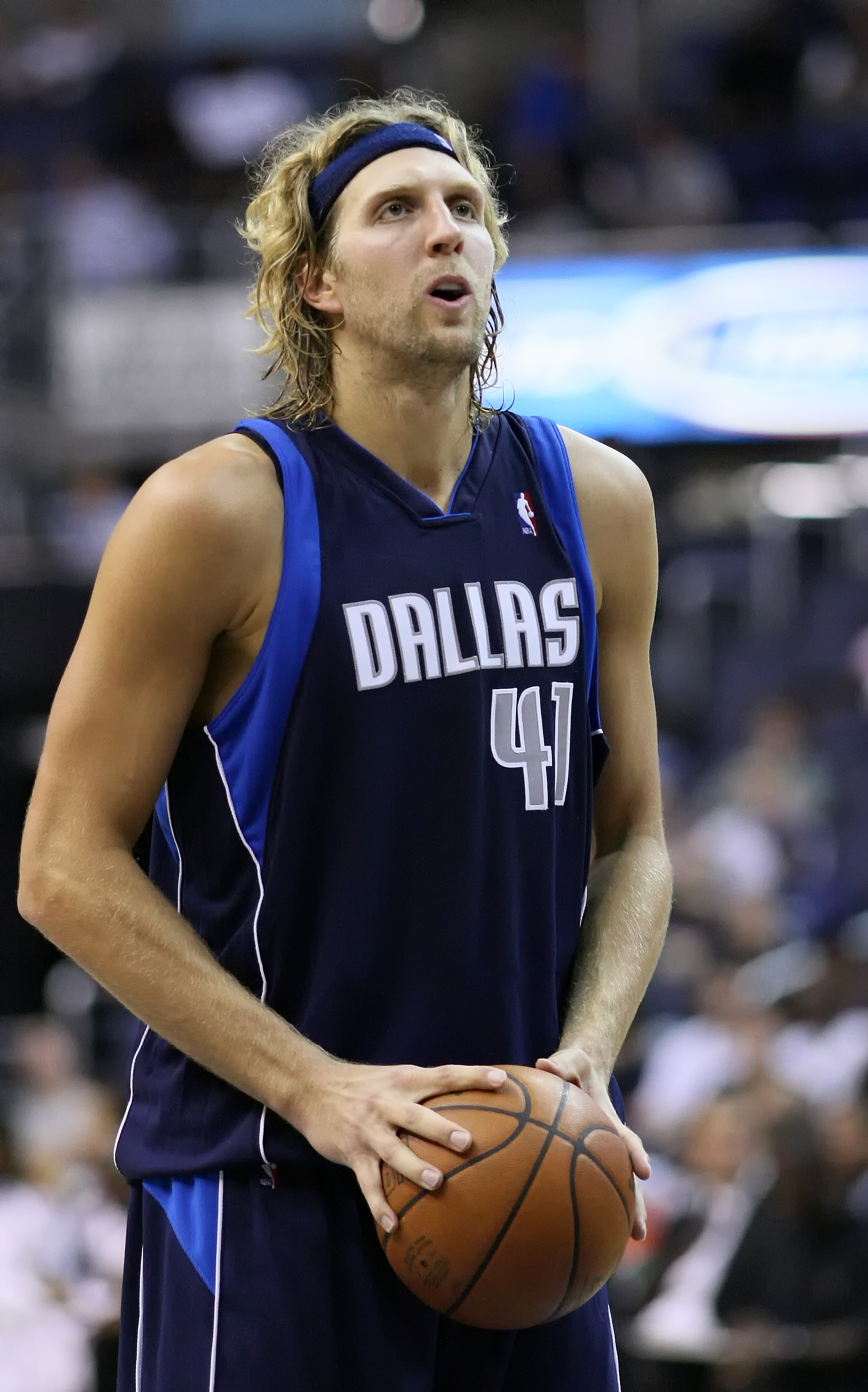
Dirk Nowitzki with the Dallas Mavericks

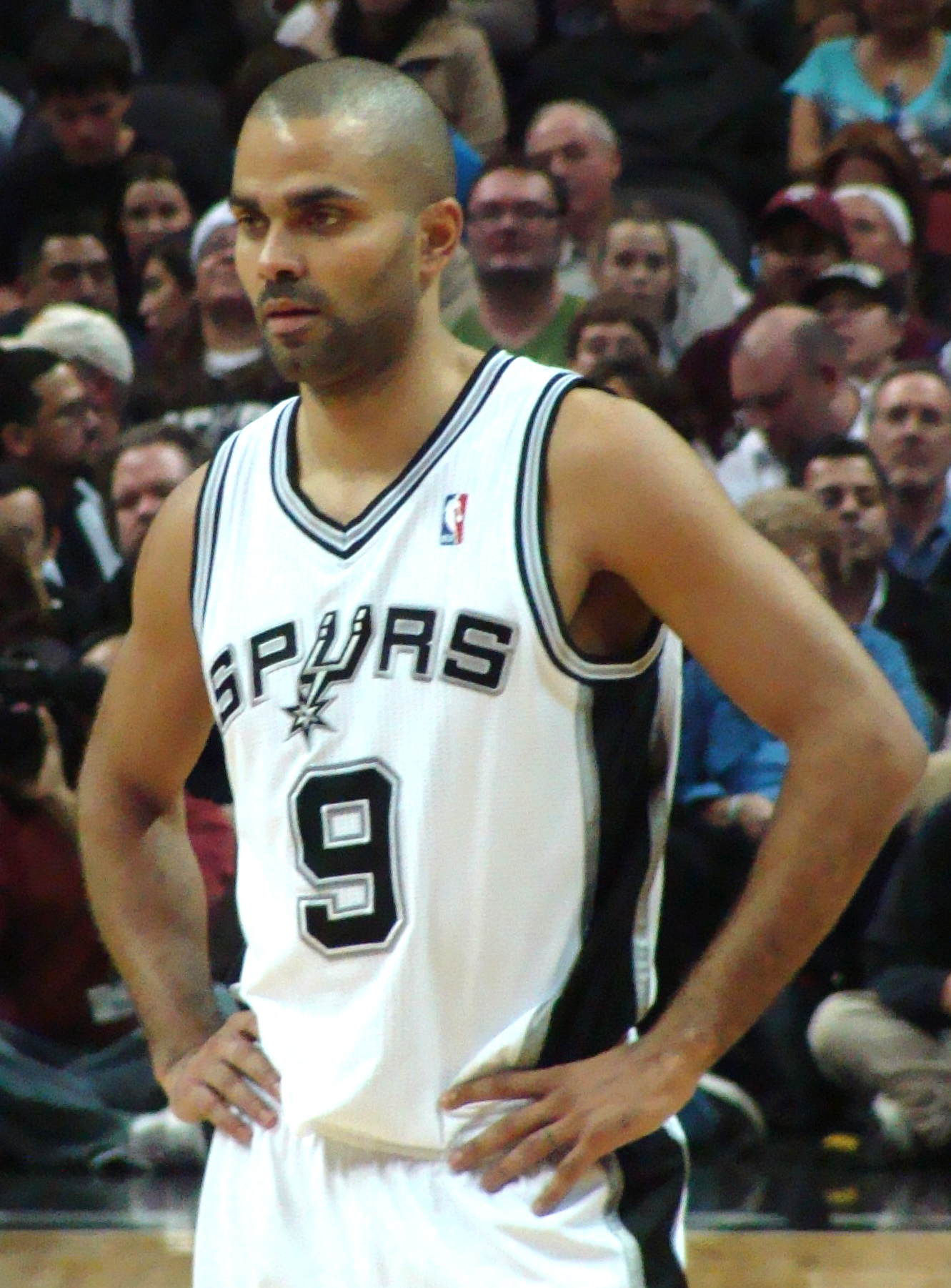
Tony Parker with the San Antonio Spurs

Date	Name	Team(s) played (years)	Age	Notes	Ref.
March 1	Channing Frye	New York Knicks (2005–2007); Portland Trail Blazers (2007–2009); Phoenix Suns (2009–2014); Orlando Magic (2014–2016); Cleveland Cavaliers (2016–2018; 2018–2019); Los Angeles Lakers (2018)	36	NBA champion (2016); NBA All-Rookie First Team (2006)	
April 9	Dwyane Wade	Miami Heat (2003–2016; 2018–2019); Chicago Bulls (2016–2017); Cleveland Cavaliers (2017–2018)	37	3× NBA champion (2006, 2012, 2013); NBA Finals MVP (2006); 13× NBA All-Star (2005–2011, 2013-2016, 2019); NBA All-Star Game MVP (2010); 2× All-NBA First Team (2009, 2010); 3× All-NBA Second Team (2005, 2006, 2011); 3× All-NBA Third Team (2007, 2012, 2013); 3× NBA All-Defensive Second Team (2005, 2009, 2010); NBA scoring champion (2009); NBA All-Rookie First Team (2004)	
April 9	Dirk Nowitzki	Dallas Mavericks (1998–2019)	40	NBA champion (2011); NBA Finals MVP (2011); NBA Most Valuable Player (2007); 13× NBA All-Star (2002–2011, 2014–2015, 2019); 4× All-NBA First Team (2005–2007, 2009); 5× All-NBA Second Team (2002, 2003, 2008, 2010, 2011); 3× All-NBA Third Team (2001, 2004, 2012); 50–40–90 club (2007); NBA Three-Point Shootout champion (2006); NBA Teammate of the Year (2017); Played his entire career with one franchise Also played overseas	
June 10	Tony Parker	San Antonio Spurs (2001–2018); Charlotte Hornets (2018–2019)	37	4× NBA champion (2003, 2005, 2007, 2014); NBA Finals MVP (2007); 5× NBA All-Star (2006–2007, 2009, 2013, 2014); 3× All-NBA Second Team (2013–2015); All-NBA Third Team (2010); NBA All-Rookie First Team (2002); Also played overseas	
June 28	Darren Collison	New Orleans Hornets (2009–2010); Indiana Pacers (2010–2012; 2017–2019); Dallas Mavericks (2012–2013); Los Angeles Clippers (2013–2014); Sacramento Kings (2014–2017)	31	NBA All-Rookie First Team (2010)	
August 27	Gary Neal	San Antonio Spurs (2010–2013); Milwaukee Bucks (2013–2014); Charlotte Hornets (2014–2015); Minnesota Timberwolves (2015); Washington Wizards (2015–2016); Atlanta Hawks (2017)	34	Also played overseas and in the G League. Hired as an assistant coach by the Towson Tigers	
August 29	Zaza Pachulia	Orlando Magic (2003–2004); Milwaukee Bucks (2004–2005, 2013–2015); Atlanta Hawks (2005–2013); Dallas Mavericks (2015–2016); Golden State Warriors (2016–2018); Detroit Pistons (2018–2019)	35	2× NBA champion (2017, 2018); Also played overseas. Hired as a team consultant by the Golden State Warriors.	
September 13	Shaun Livingston	Los Angeles Clippers (2004–2008); Miami Heat (2008–2009); Oklahoma City Thunder (2009); Washington Wizards (2010, 2012); Charlotte Hornets (2010–2011); Milwaukee Bucks (2011–2012); Cleveland Cavaliers (2012–2013); Brooklyn Nets (2013–2014); Golden State Warriors (2014–2019)	34	3x NBA champion (2015, 2017, 2018); Also played in the G League.	
September 17	Jason Terry	Atlanta Hawks (1999–2004); Dallas Mavericks (2004–2012); Boston Celtics (2012–2013); Brooklyn Nets (2013–2014); Houston Rockets (2014–2016); Milwaukee Bucks (2016–2018)	42	NBA champion (2011); NBA Sixth Man of the Year (2009); NBA All-Rookie Second Team (2000); Hired as assistant general manager to the Texas Legends.	
October 18	Luol Deng	Chicago Bulls (2004–2014); Cleveland Cavaliers (2014); Miami Heat (2014–2016); Los Angeles Lakers (2016–2018); Minnesota Timberwolves (2018–2019)	34	NBA All-Star (2012, 2013); NBA All-Defensive Second Team (2012); NBA All-Rookie First Team (2005); NBA Sportsmanship Award (2007); J. Walter Kennedy Citizenship Award (2014)	
November 4	José Calderón	Toronto Raptors (2005–2013); Detroit Pistons (2013, 2018–2019); Dallas Mavericks (2013–2014); New York Knicks (2014–2016); Los Angeles Lakers (2016–2017); Atlanta Hawks (2017); Cleveland Cavaliers (2017–2018)	38	Also played overseas. Hired as the special assistant to the executive director of the National Basketball Players Association.	
December 28	Zach Randolph	Portland Trail Blazers (2001–2007); New York Knicks (2007–2008); Los Angeles Clippers (2008–2009); Memphis Grizzlies (2009–2017); Sacramento Kings (2017–2018)	38	2× NBA All-Star (2010, 2013); All-NBA Third Team (2011); NBA Most Improved Player (2004)	
February 16	Marcin Gortat	Orlando Magic (2007–2010); Phoenix Suns (2010–2013); Washington Wizards (2013–2018); Los Angeles Clippers (2018–2019)	36	Also played overseas.	
April 14	Trevor Booker	Washington Wizards (2010–2014); Utah Jazz (2014–2016); Brooklyn Nets (2016–2017); Philadelphia 76ers (2017–2018); Indiana Pacers (2018)	32	Also played overseas.	
May 24	Jon Leuer	Milwaukee Bucks (2011–2012); Cleveland Cavaliers (2012–2013); Memphis Grizzlies (2013–2015); Phoenix Suns (2015–2016); Detroit Pistons (2016–2019)	31	Also played overseas.	
June 25	Vince Carter	Toronto Raptors (1998–2004); New Jersey Nets (2004–2009); Orlando Magic (2009–2010); Phoenix Suns (2010–2011); Dallas Mavericks (2011–2014); Memphis Grizzlies (2014–2017); Sacramento Kings (2017–2018); Atlanta Hawks (2019–2020)	43	8× NBA All-Star (2000–2007); All-NBA Second Team (2001); All-NBA Third Team (2000); NBA Rookie of the Year (1999); NBA All-Rookie First Team (1999); Slam Dunk Contest champion (2000); NBA Sportsmanship Award (2020); NBA Teammate of the Year (2016)	

== Front office movements ==
=== Head coaching changes ===
Off-season

Departure date	Team	Outgoing head coach	Reason for departure	Hire date	Incoming head coach	Last coaching position	Ref.
April 11	Cleveland Cavaliers	Larry Drew	Resigned	May 13	John Beilein	Michigan head coach (2007–2019)	
April 11	Memphis Grizzlies	J. B. Bickerstaff	Fired	June 11	Taylor Jenkins	Milwaukee Bucks assistant coach (2018–2019)	
April 11	Sacramento Kings	Dave Joerger	Fired	April 14	Luke Walton	Los Angeles Lakers head coach (2016–2019)	
April 12	Los Angeles Lakers	Luke Walton	Agreed to part ways	May 11	Frank Vogel	Orlando Magic head coach (2016–2018)	
April 23	Phoenix Suns	Igor Kokoškov	Fired	May 3	Monty Williams	Philadelphia 76ers assistant coach (2018–2019)	

In-season

Departure date	Team	Outgoing head coach	Reason for departure	Hire date	Incoming head coach	Last coaching position	Ref.
December 6	New York Knicks	David Fizdale	Fired	December 6	Mike Miller (interim)	New York Knicks assistant coach (2019)	
February 19	Cleveland Cavaliers	John Beilein	Resigned	February 19	J. B. Bickerstaff	Cleveland Cavaliers assistant/associate head coach (2019–2020)	
March 7	Brooklyn Nets	Kenny Atkinson	Mutually agree to part ways	March 7	Jacque Vaughn (interim)	Brooklyn Nets assistant coach (2016–2020)	

=== General manager changes ===
Offseason

Departure date	Team	Outgoing general manager	Reason for departure	Hire date	Incoming general manager	Last managerial position	Ref.
April 11	Phoenix Suns	Trevor Bukstein (interim)	Demoted	April 11	James Jones	Phoenix Suns general manager (2018–present)	
April 11	Memphis Grizzlies	Chris Wallace	Demoted	April 11	Zach Klieman	Memphis Grizzlies assistant general manager (2018–2019)	
April 17	New Orleans Pelicans	Danny Ferry (interim)	Replaced	May 19	Trajan Langdon	Brooklyn Nets assistant general manager (2016–2019)	
July 23	San Antonio Spurs	R. C. Buford	Promoted	July 23	Brian Wright	San Antonio Spurs assistant general manager (2016–2019)	

In-season

Departure date	Team	Outgoing general manager	Reason for departure	Hire date	Incoming general manager	Last managerial position	Ref.
April 13	Chicago Bulls	Gar Forman	Fired	May 1	Marc Eversley	Philadelphia 76ers VP of Player Personnel (2016–2019)	
April 13	Denver Nuggets	Artūras Karnišovas	Signed with Chicago	July 7	Calvin Booth	Denver Nuggets assistant general manager (2017–2020)	
June 18	Detroit Pistons	Ed Stefanski (interim)	Demoted	June 18	Troy Weaver	Oklahoma City Thunder VP of basketball operations (2019–2020)	

== Player movements ==
=== Trades ===
June
June 19	To Miami Heat: 2019 CHA second round pick (No. 44)	To Atlanta Hawks: 2024 MIA protected second-round pick (Note: Atlanta will receive the pick if it's No. 51-55, else they receive nothing.); Cash considerations
June 20 (draft-day trades)	To Golden State Warriors: 2019 ATL second round pick (No. 41)	To Atlanta Hawks: 2024 GSW second-round pick (Note: Atlanta traded this pick to Houston on February 5.); Cash considerations
June 20 (draft-day trades)	To Golden State Warriors: Draft rights to Alen Smailagić (No. 39)	To New Orleans Pelicans: 2021 GSW second-round pick (Note: New Orleans traded this pick to Utah on July 7.); 2023 GSW second-round pick; Cash considerations
June 20 (draft-day trades)	To Los Angeles Lakers: Draft rights to Talen Horton-Tucker (No. 46)	To Orlando Magic: 2020 LAL second-round pick (Note: Orlando traded this pick to Philadelphia on February 6, 2020.); Cash considerations
June 20 (draft-day trades)	To Detroit Pistons: Draft rights to Kevin Porter Jr. (No. 30); Tony Snell	To Milwaukee Bucks: Jon Leuer
June 21	To Denver Nuggets: Draft rights to Bol Bol (No. 44)	To Miami Heat: 2022 second-round pick (Note: Minnesota has the right to swap Philadelphia's pick for Denver's, after which Miami will receive the remaining pick. Miami will then forfeit the pick for tampering in the Kyle Lowry sign-and-trade in 2021, as the team traded away its own 2022 pick.); Cash considerations
June 21	To Philadelphia 76ers: Draft rights to Matisse Thybulle (No. 20)	To Boston Celtics: Draft rights to Ty Jerome (No. 24); Draft rights to Carsen Edwards (No. 33)
June 21	To Los Angeles Clippers: Draft rights to Mfiondu Kabengele (No. 27)	To Brooklyn Nets: Draft rights to Jaylen Hands (No. 56); 2020 PHI protected first-round pick (Note: Brooklyn will receive the pick if it's No. 15-30, else it will roll over with the same condition through 2022, then convert to Philadelphia's 2023 and 2024 second-round picks.)
June 21	Three-team trade	
June 21	To Utah Jazz: Draft rights to Jarrell Brantley (No. 50) (from Indiana); Draft rights to Miye Oni (No. 58) (from Golden State)	To Indiana Pacers: 2021 UTA second-round pick; Cash considerations (from Utah)
June 21	To Golden State Warriors: Cash considerations (from Utah)	
June 21	To Sacramento Kings: Draft rights to Kyle Guy (No. 55); Cash considerations	To New York Knicks: Draft rights to Ignas Brazdeikis (No. 47)
June 21	To Washington Wizards: Draft rights to Admiral Schofield (No. 42); Jonathon Simmons	To Philadelphia 76ers: Cash considerations
June 24	To Atlanta Hawks: Evan Turner	To Portland Trail Blazers: Kent Bazemore
June 26	To Cleveland Cavaliers: Draft rights to Kevin Porter Jr. (No. 30)	To Detroit Pistons: 2020 UTA second-round pick (Note: Detroit traded this pick to Dallas the same day.); 2021 POR second-round pick; 2023 POR second-round pick; 2024 MIA protected second-round pick (Note: Detroit traded this pick to Philadelphia on July 7.); Cash considerations
June 26	To Dallas Mavericks: Draft rights to Isaiah Roby (No. 45); 2020 UTA second-round pick (Note: Dallas traded this pick to Golden State on January 25.); 2021 POR second-round pick (Note: Dallas traded this pick to Memphis on July 8.)	To Detroit Pistons: Draft rights to Deividas Sirvydis (No. 37)
July
July 6	Three-team trade	
July 6	To Miami Heat: Draft rights to KZ Okpala (No. 32) (from Phoenix)	To Indiana Pacers: T. J. Warren (from Phoenix); 2022 MIA second-round pick; 2025 MIA second-round pick; 2026 MIA second-round pick
July 6	To Phoenix Suns: Cash considerations (from Indiana)	
July 6	To Atlanta Hawks: Allen Crabbe; Draft rights to Nickeil Alexander-Walker (No. 17); 2020 BKN protected first-round pick (Note: Atlanta traded this pick to Minnesota on February 5, 2020.)	To Brooklyn Nets: Taurean Prince; 2021 ATL second-round pick
July 6	To Memphis Grizzlies: Grayson Allen; Jae Crowder; Kyle Korver; Draft rights to Darius Bazley (No. 23); 2020 UTA protected first-round pick (Note: Memphis will receive the pick if it's #8-14, else it will over with the same condition to 2021, then with changed conditions in 2022 (No. 7-30), 2023 (No. 4-30), and 2024 (No. 2-30), after which it will convert to Utah's 2025 and 2026 second-round picks)	To Utah Jazz: Mike Conley Jr.
July 6	To Minnesota Timberwolves: Draft rights to Jarrett Culver (No. 6)	To Phoenix Suns: Dario Šarić; Draft rights to Cameron Johnson (No. 11)
July 6	To Boston Celtics: 2020 MIL protected first-round pick (Note: Boston will receive the pick if it's #8-30, else they will receive Milwaukee's 2021 first-round pick.)	To Phoenix Suns: Aron Baynes; Draft rights to Ty Jerome (No. 24)
July 6	Four-team trade	
July 6	To Miami Heat: Jimmy Butler (sign and trade) (from Philadelphia); Meyers Leonard (from Portland); Cash considerations (from LA Clippers)	To Philadelphia 76ers: Josh Richardson (from Miami)
July 6	To Los Angeles Clippers: Maurice Harkless (from Portland); Draft rights to Mathias Lessort (2017 No. 50) (from Philadelphia); 2023 MIA protected first-round pick (Note: The Clippers traded this pick to Oklahoma City on July 10.)	To Portland Trail Blazers: Hassan Whiteside (from Miami)
July 6	To Memphis Grizzlies: Dwight Howard	To Washington Wizards: C. J. Miles
July 6	To Indiana Pacers: Malcolm Brogdon (sign and trade)	To Milwaukee Bucks: 2020 IND protected first-round pick (Note: Milwaukee will receive the pick if it's No. 15-30, else it will roll over with the same condition through 2025, then become unprotected in 2026.); 2021 IND protected second-round pick (Note: Milwaukee could receive this pick as late as 2024, as Indiana owes Brooklyn its protected second-round pick beginning in 2020; the pick to Brooklyn becomes unprotected in 2023, and Milwaukee will receive Indiana's pick the year after Brooklyn receive Indiana's pick.); 2025 IND second-round pick
July 6	Three-team trade	
July 6	To Brooklyn Nets: Draft rights to Nemanja Dangubić (2014 No. 54) (from San Antonio); Draft rights to Aaron White (2015 No. 49) (from Washington)	To San Antonio Spurs: DeMarre Carroll (sign and trade) (from Brooklyn)
July 6	To Washington Wizards: Dāvis Bertāns (from San Antonio)	
July 6	To Boston Celtics: Kemba Walker (sign and trade); 2020 second-round pick (Note: Boston will receive the worse of the picks originally belonging to Brooklyn and New York.)	To Charlotte Hornets: Terry Rozier (sign and trade); 2020 BOS protected second-round pick (Note: Charlotte will receive the pick if it's No. 54-60, else they receive nothing)
July 6	To Memphis Grizzlies: Draft rights to Brandon Clarke (No. 21)	To Oklahoma City Thunder: Draft rights to Darius Bazley (No. 23); 2024 MEM second-round pick
July 6	Three-team trade	
July 6	To Los Angeles Lakers: Anthony Davis (from New Orleans)	To New Orleans Pelicans: Lonzo Ball (from LA Lakers); Josh Hart (from LA Lakers); Brandon Ingram (from LA Lakers); Draft rights to De'Andre Hunter (No. 4) (from LA Lakers); 2021 LAL protected first-round pick (Note: New Orleans will receive the pick if it's No. 1-7, else they will receive the Lakers' pick in 2022. Conveyedi in 2022.) (from LA Lakers); 2024 LAL first-round pick (Note: New Orleans has the right to receive the Lakers' 2025 first-round pick instead.) (from LA Lakers); 2023 LAL first-round pick swap; Cash considerations (from LA Lakers); Cash considerations (from Washington)
July 6	To Washington Wizards: Isaac Bonga (from LA Lakers); Jemerrio Jones (from LA Lakers); Moritz Wagner (from LA Lakers); 2022 second-round pick (Note: Chicago has the right to swap picks with Detroit, after which Washington has the right to swap the Lakers' pick with Chicago, resulting in the Wizards receiving the best of the three picks. Due to later trades, all three picks went to other teams.) (from LA Lakers)	
July 7	To Atlanta Hawks: Solomon Hill; Draft rights to De'Andre Hunter (No. 4); Draft rights to Jordan Bone (No. 57); 2023 NOP protected second-round pick (Note: Atlanta will receive the pick if it's No. 46-60, else they receive nothing.)	To New Orleans Pelicans: Draft rights to Jaxson Hayes (No. 8); Draft rights to Nickeil Alexander-Walker (No. 17); Draft rights to Didi Louzada (No. 35); 2020 CLE protected first-round pick (Note: New Orleans will receive the pick if it's No. 11-30, else they will receive Cleveland's 2021 and 2022 second-round picks.)
July 7	To Atlanta Hawks: Draft rights to Bruno Fernando (No. 34)	To Philadelphia 76ers: Draft rights to Jordan Bone (No. 57); 2020 ATL protected second-round pick (Note: Philadelphia will receive the pick if it falls between No. 31-55, else they receive nothing); 2023 second-round pick (Note: Philadelphia will receive the best of the picks originally belonging to Atlanta, Brooklyn, and Charlotte.)
July 7	To Philadelphia 76ers: 2024 MIA protected second-round pick (Note: Philadelphia will receive the pick if it's No. 56-60, else they receive nothing.); Cash considerations	To Detroit Pistons: Draft rights to Jordan Bone (No. 57)
July 7	To Golden State Warriors: Julian Washburn^{†}	To Memphis Grizzlies: Andre Iguodala; 2024 GSW protected first-round pick (Note: Memphis will receive the pick if it's No. 5-30, else it will roll over to 2025 (No. 2-30), then 2026 when it will become unprotected.)
July 7	To Phoenix Suns: Jevon Carter; Kyle Korver	To Memphis Grizzlies: Josh Jackson; De'Anthony Melton; 2020 PHX second-round pick; 2021 PHX protected second-round pick (Note: Memphis will receive the pick if it's No. 31-35, else they receive nothing.)
July 7	To Chicago Bulls: Tomáš Satoranský (sign and trade)	To Washington Wizards: 2020 protected conditional second-round pick (Note: Washington will receive the better of the picks originally belonging to Chicago and Memphis unless both are No. 56-60, in which case Washington receives nothing.); removal of protection on 2023 CHI second-round pick
July 7	To New Orleans Pelicans: Derrick Favors	To Utah Jazz: 2021 GSW second-round pick; 2023 GSW second-round pick (Note: Utah traded this pick to Cleveland on December 23.)
July 7	To Atlanta Hawks: Chandler Parsons	To Memphis Grizzlies: Solomon Hill; Miles Plumlee
July 7	To Brooklyn Nets: Kevin Durant (sign and trade); 2020 GSW protected first-round pick (Note: Brooklyn will receive the pick if it's No. 21-30, else they receive Golden State's 2025 second-round pick.)	To Golden State Warriors: D'Angelo Russell (sign and trade); Shabazz Napier; Treveon Graham
July 8	To Atlanta Hawks: Damian Jones; 2026 GSW second-round pick	To Golden State Warriors: Omari Spellman
July 8	To Minnesota Timberwolves: Jake Layman (sign and trade)	To Portland Trail Blazers: Draft rights to Bojan Dubljević (2013 No. 59)
July 8	To Denver Nuggets: Jerami Grant	To Oklahoma City Thunder: 2020 DEN protected first-round pick (Note: Oklahoma City will receive the pick if it's No. 11-30, else it will roll over with the same condition through 2022; if the pick isn't conveyed by 2022, it will convert to Denver's 2023 and 2024 second-round picks.)
July 8	To Dallas Mavericks: Delon Wright (sign and trade)	To Memphis Grizzlies: Draft rights to Satnam Singh (2015 No. 52); 2021 POR second-round pick; 2023 second-round pick (Note: Memphis will receive the worse of the picks originally belonging to Dallas and Miami.)
July 8	To Minnesota Timberwolves: Treveon Graham; Shabazz Napier; Cash considerations	To Golden State Warriors: Draft rights to Lior Eliyahu (2006 No. 44)
July 10	To Los Angeles Clippers: Paul George	To Oklahoma City Thunder: Danilo Gallinari; Shai Gilgeous-Alexander; 2021 MIA first-round pick; 2022 LAC first-round pick; 2023 MIA protected first-round pick (Note: Oklahoma City will receive the pick if it's No. 15-30, else it will roll over with the same condition through 2025 and become unprotected in 2026.); 2023 LAC first-round pick swap; 2024 LAC first-round pick; 2025 LAC first-round pick swap; 2026 LAC first-round pick
July 16	To Houston Rockets: Russell Westbrook	To Oklahoma City Thunder: Chris Paul; 2021 limited right to swap first-round picks (Note: Oklahoma City has the right to swap either its first-round pick or Miami's first-round pick for Houston's subject if Houston's pick is No. 5-30, else the swap right is extinguished.); 2024 HOU protected first-round pick (Note: Oklahoma will receive the pick if it's No. 5-30, else it will convert to Houston's 2024 and 2025 second-round picks); 2025 limited right to swap first-round picks (Note: Oklahoma has the right to swap its pick for either Houston's pick (if No. 11-30) or the Clippers'); 2026 HOU protected first-round pick (Note: Oklahoma City will receive the pick if it's No. 5-30, else it will convert to Houston's 2026 second-round pick.)
December
December 23	To Cleveland Cavaliers: Dante Exum; 2022 SAS second-round pick; 2023 GSW second-round pick	To Utah Jazz: Jordan Clarkson
January
January 16	To Atlanta Hawks: Jeff Teague; Treveon Graham	To Minnesota Timberwolves: Allen Crabbe
January 21	To Portland Trail Blazers: Trevor Ariza; Wenyen Gabriel; Caleb Swanigan	To Sacramento Kings: Kent Bazemore; Anthony Tolliver; 2024 POR second-round pick; 2025 POR second-round pick
January 24	To Oklahoma City Thunder: Isaiah Roby	To Dallas Mavericks: Justin Patton; Cash considerations
January 25	To Dallas Mavericks: Willie Cauley-Stein	To Golden State Warriors: 2020 UTA second-round pick
February
February 5
February 5	Four-team trade	
February 5	To Atlanta Hawks: Clint Capela (from Houston); Nenê (from Houston)	To Denver Nuggets: Keita Bates-Diop (from Minnesota); Shabazz Napier (from Minnesota); Noah Vonleh (from Minnesota); Gerald Green (from Houston); 2020 HOU first-round pick
February 5	To Houston Rockets: Robert Covington (from Minnesota); Jordan Bell (from Minnesota); 2024 GSW second-round pick	To Minnesota Timberwolves: Malik Beasley (from Denver); Juan Hernangómez (from Denver); Jarred Vanderbilt (from Denver); Evan Turner (from Atlanta); 2020 BKN protected first-round pick (Note: Minnesota will receive the pick if it's No. 15-30, else it will roll over with the same condition through 2022; if it is not conveyed by 2022 the Timberwolves will receive the Nets' 2022 and 2024 second-round picks.)
February 6	To Cleveland Cavaliers: Andre Drummond	To Detroit Pistons: Brandon Knight; John Henson; 2023 second-round pick (Note: Detroit will receive the worse of the picks originally belonging to Cleveland and Golden State.)
February 6	To Atlanta Hawks: Dewayne Dedmon; 2020 second-round pick (Note: Dallas has the right to swap Golden State's pick for Houston's pick, after which Atlanta will receive the better of the remaining pick or Miami's pick.); 2021 MIA second-round pick	To Sacramento Kings: Alex Len; Jabari Parker
February 6	Three-team trade	
February 6	To Los Angeles Clippers: Marcus Morris (from New York); Isaiah Thomas (from Washington)	To New York Knicks: Maurice Harkless (from LA Clippers); 2020 LAC first-round pick; 2021 LAC protected first-round pick swap (Note: New York may swap picks if the Clippers' pick is No. 5-30; if the pick is No. 1-4 New York will receive nothing.); 2021 DET second-round pick (from LA Clippers); Draft rights to Issuf Sanon (2018 No. 44) (from Washington)
February 6	To Washington Wizards: Jerome Robinson (from LA Clippers)	
February 6	To Houston Rockets: Bruno Caboclo	to Memphis Grizzlies: Jordan Bell; 2023 limited right to swap second-round picks (Note: Dallas has the right to swap its pick for Houston's, following which Memphis will receive the better of the remaining pick or Miami's pick; if Dallas does not switch and the Rockets' pick is No. 31-32 the Grizzlies will receive nothing.)
February 6	Three-team trade	
February 6	To Miami Heat: Andre Iguodala (from Memphis); Jae Crowder (from Memphis); Solomon Hill (from Memphis)	To Memphis Grizzlies: Justise Winslow (from Miami); Dion Waiters (from Miami); Gorgui Dieng (from Minnesota)
February 6	To Minnesota Timberwolves: James Johnson (from Miami)	
February 6	To Denver Nuggets: Jordan McRae	To Washington Wizards: Shabazz Napier
February 6	To Philadelphia 76ers: Alec Burks; Glenn Robinson III	To Golden State Warriors: 2020 DAL second-round pick; 2021 DEN second-round pick; 2022 TOR second-round pick
February 6	To Atlanta Hawks: Skal Labissière; Cash considerations	To Portland Trail Blazers: 2024 ATL protected second-round pick (Note: Portland will receive the pick if it's No. 56-60, else they receive nothing.)
February 6	To Atlanta Hawks: Derrick Walton Jr.; Cash considerations	To Los Angeles Clippers: 2022 ATL protected second-round pick (Note: The Clippers will receive the pick if it's No. 56-60, else they receive nothing.)
February 6	To Golden State Warriors: Andrew Wiggins; 2021 MIN protected first-round pick (Note: Golden State will receive the pick if it's No. 4-30, else they receive Minnesota's first-round pick in 2022.); 2021 MIN second-round pick	To Minnesota Timberwolves: D'Angelo Russell; Omari Spellman; Jacob Evans
February 6	To Orlando Magic: James Ennis III	To Philadelphia 76ers: 2020 LAL second-round pick

- † Two-way contract

=== Free agents ===
Starting this season, the NBA's free agency period began on June 30 at 6 p.m. EST instead of on July 1 at midnight like in prior seasons.

Players were allowed to sign new offers starting on July 6 at 12 p.m. ET, after the July moratorium ended.

Exceptions now allow the signing of two-way contracts, minimum-salary contracts no longer than two years, and offer sheets made to restricted free agents beginning on June 30.

Denotes unsigned players whose free-agent rights were renounced

Player	Date signed	New team	Former team	Ref
Deyonta Davis	June 12	Houston Rockets (claimed off of waviers)	Atlanta Hawks (waived on June 10)	
JaKeenan Gant	July 1	Indiana Pacers	Louisiana (undrafted in 2019)	
Nerlens Noel*	July 1	Oklahoma City Thunder		
C. J. Wilcox	July 1	Indiana Pacers		
Chris Clemons	July 2	Houston Rockets	Campbell (undrafted in 2019)	
William McDowell-White	July 2	Houston Rockets	Brose Bamberg (Germany) (undrafted in 2019)	
Shamorie Ponds	July 2	Houston Rockets	St. John's (undrafted in 2019)	
Mario Hezonja	July 3	Portland Trail Blazers	New York Knicks	
Anthony Tolliver	July 3	Portland Trail Blazers	Minnesota Timberwolves	
Al-Farouq Aminu	July 6	Orlando Magic	Portland Trail Blazers	
Malcolm Brogdon (RFA)	July 6	Indiana Pacers (sign and trade)	Milwaukee Bucks	
Thomas Bryant (RFA)	July 6	Washington Wizards		
Jimmy Butler*	July 6	Miami Heat (sign and trade)	Philadelphia 76ers	
Kentavious Caldwell-Pope	July 6	Los Angeles Lakers		
DeMarre Carroll	July 6	San Antonio Spurs (sign and trade)	Brooklyn Nets	
Quinn Cook	July 6	Los Angeles Lakers	Golden State Warriors	
DeMarcus Cousins	July 6	Los Angeles Lakers	Golden State Warriors	
Tim Frazier	July 6	Detroit Pistons	Milwaukee Bucks	
Danny Green	July 6	Los Angeles Lakers	Toronto Raptors	
Rodney Hood	July 6	Portland Trail Blazers		
Kyrie Irving*	July 6	Brooklyn Nets	Boston Celtics	
DeAndre Jordan	July 6	Brooklyn Nets	New York Knicks	
Cory Joseph	July 6	Sacramento Kings	Indiana Pacers	
Jalen Lecque	July 6	Phoenix Suns	Brewster Academy (undrafted in 2019)	
Brook Lopez	July 6	Milwaukee Bucks		
JaVale McGee	July 6	Los Angeles Lakers		
Markieff Morris	July 6	Detroit Pistons	Oklahoma City Thunder	
Derrick Rose	July 6	Detroit Pistons	Minnesota Timberwolves	
Terrence Ross	July 6	Orlando Magic		
Terry Rozier (RFA)	July 6	Charlotte Hornets (sign and trade)	Boston Celtics	
Nikola Vučević	July 6	Orlando Magic		
Kemba Walker	July 6	Boston Celtics (sign and trade)	Charlotte Hornets	
Thaddeus Young	July 6	Chicago Bulls	Indiana Pacers	
Trevor Ariza	July 7	Sacramento Kings	Washington Wizards	
Bojan Bogdanović	July 7	Utah Jazz	Indiana Pacers	
Alex Caruso**** (RFA)	July 7	Los Angeles Lakers		
Troy Daniels	July 7	Los Angeles Lakers	Phoenix Suns	
Jared Dudley	July 7	Los Angeles Lakers	Brooklyn Nets	
Kevin Durant*	July 7	Brooklyn Nets (sign and trade)	Golden State Warriors	
Jeremy Lamb	July 7	Indiana Pacers	Charlotte Hornets	
Patrick McCaw (RFA)	July 7	Toronto Raptors		
Shake Milton	July 7	Philadelphia 76ers (previously on a two-way contract)		
D'Angelo Russell (RFA)	July 7	Golden State Warriors (sign and trade)	Brooklyn Nets	
Tomáš Satoranský (RFA)	July 7	Chicago Bulls (sign and trade)	Washington Wizards	
Harrison Barnes*	July 8	Sacramento Kings		
Avery Bradley	July 8	Los Angeles Lakers	Memphis Grizzlies (waived on July 6)	
Willie Cauley-Stein	July 8	Golden State Warriors	Sacramento Kings	
Wilson Chandler	July 8	Brooklyn Nets	Los Angeles Clippers	
Dewayne Dedmon	July 8	Sacramento Kings	Atlanta Hawks	
Wayne Ellington	July 8	New York Knicks	Detroit Pistons	
Rudy Gay	July 8	San Antonio Spurs		
Taj Gibson	July 8	New York Knicks	Minnesota Timberwolves	
George Hill	July 8	Milwaukee Bucks (previously waived on July 1)		
Jake Layman (RFA)	July 8	Minnesota Timberwolves (sign and trade)	Portland Trail Blazers	
Elfrid Payton	July 8	New York Knicks	New Orleans Pelicans	
Theo Pinson	July 8	Brooklyn Nets		
Bobby Portis	July 8	New York Knicks	Washington Wizards	
Julius Randle*	July 8	New York Knicks	New Orleans Pelicans	
Rajon Rondo	July 8	Los Angeles Lakers		
Ricky Rubio	July 8	Phoenix Suns	Utah Jazz	
Ish Smith	July 8	Washington Wizards	Detroit Pistons	
Garrett Temple	July 8	Brooklyn Nets	Los Angeles Clippers	
Noah Vonleh	July 8	Minnesota Timberwolves	New York Knicks	
Tyrone Wallace	July 8	Minnesota Timberwolves (claimed off waivers)	Los Angeles Clippers (waived on July 6)	
Delon Wright (RFA)	July 8	Dallas Mavericks (sign and trade)	Memphis Grizzlies	
Devontae Cacok	July 9	Los Angeles Lakers	UNC Wilmington (undrafted in 2019)	
Aric Holman	July 9	Los Angeles Lakers	Mississippi State (undrafted in 2019)	
Tyus Jones (RFA)	July 9	Memphis Grizzlies	Minnesota Timberwolves	
Kawhi Leonard*	July 9	Los Angeles Clippers	Toronto Raptors	
Mike Muscala	July 9	Oklahoma City Thunder	Los Angeles Lakers	
Glenn Robinson III**	July 9	Golden State Warriors	Detroit Pistons	
Isaiah Thomas	July 9	Washington Wizards	Denver Nuggets	
Khem Birch (RFA)	July 10	Orlando Magic		
Michael Carter-Williams	July 10	Orlando Magic		
Seth Curry	July 10	Dallas Mavericks	Portland Trail Blazers	
Terence Davis	July 10	Toronto Raptors	Ole Miss (undrafted in 2019)	
Dorian Finney-Smith (RFA)	July 10	Dallas Mavericks		
Tobias Harris	July 10	Philadelphia 76ers		
Al Horford*	July 10	Philadelphia 76ers	Boston Celtics	
Stanley Johnson	July 10	Toronto Raptors	New Orleans Pelicans	
Maxi Kleber (RFA)	July 10	Dallas Mavericks		
Rodney McGruder (RFA)	July 10	Los Angeles Clippers		
Mike Scott	July 10	Philadelphia 76ers		
Klay Thompson	July 10	Golden State Warriors		
Ivica Zubac (RFA)	July 10	Los Angeles Clippers		
Ryan Arcidiacono (RFA)	July 11	Chicago Bulls		
Jordan Bell	July 11	Minnesota Timberwolves	Golden State Warriors	
Patrick Beverley	July 11	Los Angeles Clippers		
Alec Burks	July 11	Golden State Warriors	Sacramento Kings	
James Ennis III*	July 11	Philadelphia 76ers		
Kevon Looney	July 11	Golden State Warriors		
Jeremiah Martin	July 11	Miami Heat	Memphis (undrafted in 2019)	
Khris Middleton*	July 11	Milwaukee Bucks		
Raul Neto	July 11	Philadelphia 76ers	Utah Jazz (waived on July 1)	
Kyle O'Quinn	July 11	Philadelphia 76ers	Indiana Pacers	
Jabari Parker**	July 11	Atlanta Hawks	Washington Wizards	
Chris Silva	July 11	Miami Heat	South Carolina (undrafted in 2019)	
Jonas Valančiūnas*	July 11	Memphis Grizzlies		
Robin Lopez	July 12	Milwaukee Bucks	Chicago Bulls	
Trey Lyles	July 12	San Antonio Spurs	Denver Nuggets	
Wesley Matthews	July 12	Milwaukee Bucks	Indiana Pacers	
Kristaps Porziņģis (RFA)	July 12	Dallas Mavericks		
Vincent Poirier	July 13	Boston Celtics	Baskonia (Spain)	
Justin Robinson	July 13	Washington Wizards	Virginia Tech (undrafted in 2019)	
Kyle Alexander	July 15	Miami Heat	Tennessee (undrafted in 2019)	
Marcus Morris	July 15	New York Knicks	Boston Celtics	
JJ Redick	July 15	New Orleans Pelicans	Philadelphia 76ers	
Thanasis Antetokounmpo	July 16	Milwaukee Bucks	Panathinaikos B.C. (Greece)	
Reggie Bullock	July 16	New York Knicks	Los Angeles Lakers	
Richaun Holmes	July 16	Sacramento Kings	Phoenix Suns	
Danuel House (RFA)	July 16	Houston Rockets		
Kelly Oubre Jr. (RFA)	July 16	Phoenix Suns		
Austin Rivers	July 16	Houston Rockets		
Daniel Theis (RFA)	July 16	Boston Celtics		
Rondae Hollis-Jefferson	July 17	Toronto Raptors	Brooklyn Nets	
William Howard	July 17	Utah Jazz	Limoges CSP (France)	
Frank Kaminsky	July 17	Phoenix Suns	Charlotte Hornets	
Enes Kanter	July 17	Boston Celtics	Portland Trail Blazers	
Stanton Kidd	July 17	Utah Jazz	Darüşşafaka (Turkey)	
Tyler Lydon	July 17	Sacramento Kings	Denver Nuggets	
David Nwaba	July 17	Brooklyn Nets	Cleveland Cavaliers	
Tariq Owens	July 17	Phoenix Suns	Texas Tech (undrafted in 2019)	
Brad Wanamaker	July 17	Boston Celtics		
Christian Wood	July 17	Detroit Pistons (claimed off waivers)	New Orleans Pelicans (waived on July 15)	
Tyson Chandler	July 18	Houston Rockets	Los Angeles Lakers	
JaMychal Green	July 18	Los Angeles Clippers		
Donta Hall	July 18	Detroit Pistons	Alabama (undrafted in 2019)	
Shaquille Harrison	July 18	Chicago Bulls (previously waived on July 6)		
Luke Kornet	July 18	Chicago Bulls	New York Knicks	
Naz Reid	July 18	Minnesota Timberwolves (previously on a two-way contract)		
Matt Thomas	July 18	Toronto Raptors	Valencia (Spain)	
Todd Withers	July 18	Detroit Pistons	Grand Rapids Drive (G League)	
Jordan Caroline	July 19	Los Angeles Lakers	Nevada (undrafted in 2019)	
Ed Davis	July 19	Utah Jazz	Brooklyn Nets	
Jeff Green	July 19	Utah Jazz	Washington Wizards	
Christ Koumadje	July 19	Philadelphia 76ers	Florida State (undrafted in 2019)	
Luke Maye	July 19	Milwaukee Bucks	UNC (undrafted in 2019)	
Emmanuel Mudiay	July 19	Utah Jazz	New York Knicks	
Oshae Brissett	July 20	Toronto Raptors	Syracuse (undrafted in 2019)	
Sagaba Konate	July 20	Toronto Raptors	West Virginia (undrafted in 2019)	
Darius Miller	July 21	New Orleans Pelicans		
Cheick Diallo	July 22	Phoenix Suns	New Orleans Pelicans	
Gerald Green	July 22	Houston Rockets		
Dedric Lawson	July 22	San Antonio Spurs	Kansas (undrafted in 2019)	
Devin Robinson****	July 22	Toronto Raptors	Washington Wizards	
Boban Marjanović	July 23	Dallas Mavericks	Philadelphia 76ers	
Ben McLemore	July 23	Houston Rockets	Sacramento Kings	
David Krämer	July 24	Phoenix Suns	Ratiopharm Ulm (Germany) (undrafted in 2019)	
Cameron Payne	July 24	Toronto Raptors	Cleveland Cavaliers	
Dragan Bender	July 25	Milwaukee Bucks	Phoenix Suns	
Anthony Bennett	July 25	Houston Rockets	Agua Caliente Clippers (G League)	
Tacko Fall	July 25	Boston Celtics	UCF (undrafted in 2019)	
Pau Gasol	July 25	Portland Trail Blazers	Milwaukee Bucks	
Javonte Green	July 25	Boston Celtics	Ratiopharm Ulm (Germany)	
Furkan Korkmaz	July 25	Philadelphia 76ers		
Kyle Korver	July 25	Milwaukee Bucks	Phoenix Suns (waived on July 8)	
Nicolò Melli	July 25	New Orleans Pelicans	Fenerbahçe (Turkey)	
Derrick Walton	July 25	Los Angeles Clippers	Alba Berlin (Germany)	
Phil Booth	July 26	Washington Wizards	Villanova (undrafted in 2019)	
Dakota Mathias	July 26	Dallas Mavericks	Joventut Badalona (Spain)	
T. J. McConnell	July 29	Indiana Pacers	Philadelphia 76ers	
Isaiah Piñeiro	July 29	Sacramento Kings	San Diego (undrafted in 2019)	
Edmond Sumner** (RFA)	July 29	Indiana Pacers		
Deng Adel****	July 30	Brooklyn Nets	Cleveland Cavaliers	
Trey Burke	July 30	Philadelphia 76ers	Dallas Mavericks	
DaQuan Jeffries	July 30	Orlando Magic	Tulsa (undrafted in 2019)	
Vic Law	July 30	Orlando Magic	Northwestern (undrafted in 2019)	
Marko Gudurić	July 31	Memphis Grizzlies	Fenerbahçe (Turkey)	
Justin Holiday	July 31	Indiana Pacers	Memphis Grizzlies	
Caleb Martin	July 31	Charlotte Hornets	Nevada (undrafted in 2019)	
Ray Spalding**	July 31	Atlanta Hawks	Phoenix Suns	
Kavell Bigby-Williams	August 2	New Orleans Pelicans	LSU (undrafted in 2019)	
James Palmer Jr.	August 2	Los Angeles Clippers	Nebraska (undrafted in 2019)	
JaKarr Sampson	August 2	Indiana Pacers	Shandong Heroes (China)	
Malik Newman	August 5	Cleveland Cavaliers	Canton Charge (G League)	
Levi Randolph	August 5	Cleveland Cavaliers	Canton Charge (G League)	
Joe Chealey****	August 6	Charlotte Hornets		
Udonis Haslem	August 6	Miami Heat		
Josh Perkins	August 6	Charlotte Hornets	Gonzaga (undrafted in 2019)	
Isaiah Miles	August 8	Philadelphia 76ers	Limoges CSP (France)	
Devyn Marble	August 9	Golden State Warriors	Aquila Basket Trento (Italy)	
Thomas Welsh	August 9	Charlotte Hornets	Denver Nuggets (waived on July 31)	
P. J. Dozier****	August 12	Denver Nuggets	Boston Celtics	
Justin Patton	August 12	Oklahoma City Thunder	Philadelphia 76ers (waived on April 3)	
Hassani Gravett	August 13	Orlando Magic	South Carolina (undrafted in 2019)	
Demetrius Jackson****	August 13	Los Angeles Lakers	Philadelphia 76ers	
Daulton Hommes	August 14	San Antonio Spurs	Point Loma Nazarene (undrafted in 2019)	
Jaylen Adams	August 15	Milwaukee Bucks	Atlanta Hawks (waived on July 13)	
Patrick Patterson	August 15	Los Angeles Clippers	Oklahoma City Thunder (waived on August 1)	
Jarell Martin	August 16	Cleveland Cavaliers	Orlando Magic	
J. J. Barea	August 19	Dallas Mavericks		
Alex Robinson	August 19	Cleveland Cavaliers	TCU (undrafted in 2019)	
Eric Mika	August 20	Sacramento Kings	Medi Bayreuth (Germany)	
Rayjon Tucker	August 20	Milwaukee Bucks	Little Rock (undrafted in 2019)	
Trevon Bluiett****	August 21	Utah Jazz	New Orleans Pelicans	
Terry Larrier	August 21	Los Angeles Clippers	UConn (undrafted in 2018)	
Juwan Morgan	August 21	Utah Jazz	Indiana (undrafted in 2019)	
Marcus Derrickson****	August 23	Atlanta Hawks	Golden State Warriors	
Dwight Howard	August 26	Los Angeles Lakers	Memphis Grizzlies (waived on August 24)	
Armoni Brooks	August 27	Atlanta Hawks	Houston (undrafted in 2019)	
Donte Grantham	August 27	Los Angeles Clippers	Oklahoma City Thunder (waived on July 25)	
Aric Holman	August 29	Dallas Mavericks (claimed off waivers)	Los Angeles Lakers (waived on August 26)	
Lindell Wigginton	August 30	Minnesota Timberwolves	Iowa State (undrafted in 2019)	
Andrew Harrison	August 31	Golden State Warriors	BC Khimki (Russia)	
Marques Bolden	September 3	Cleveland Cavaliers	Duke (undrafted in 2019)	
Amida Brimah	September 3	Indiana Pacers	Austin Spurs (G League)	
Daniel Hamilton	September 3	Cleveland Cavaliers	Rio Grande Valley Vipers (G League)	
J. P. Macura****	September 3	Cleveland Cavaliers	Charlotte Hornets	
Sindarius Thornwell	September 3	Cleveland Cavaliers	Los Angeles Clippers (waived on July 6)	
Matt Mooney	September 4	Memphis Grizzlies	Texas Tech (undrafted in 2019)	
Davon Reed****	September 4	Miami Heat	Indiana Pacers	
Nenê*	September 6	Houston Rockets		
Moses Brown	September 9	Portland Trail Blazers	UCLA (undrafted in 2019)	
Amir Hinton	September 9	New York Knicks	Shaw (undrafted in 2019)	
V. J. King	September 9	New York Knicks	Louisville (undrafted in 2019)	
Lamar Peters	September 9	New York Knicks	Mississippi State (undrafted in 2019)	
Juan Toscano	September 9	Golden State Warriors	Fuerza Regia de Monterrey (Mexico)	
Kenny Wooten	September 9	New York Knicks	Oregon (undrafted in 2019)	
Troy Caupain****	September 12	Portland Trail Blazers	Orlando Magic	
Jeff Ledbetter	September 12	San Antonio Spurs	Austin Spurs (G League)	
London Perrantes	September 12	Portland Trail Blazers	Cholet Basket (France)	
Justin Simon	September 13	Chicago Bulls	St. John's (undrafted in 2019)	
Jordan Murphy	September 15	Minnesota Timberwolves	Minnesota (undrafted in 2019)	
Mychal Mulder	September 16	Miami Heat	Windy City Bulls (G League)	
Kobi Simmons	September 16	Charlotte Hornets	Cleveland Cavaliers (waived on February 4)	
Justin Anderson	September 17	Washington Wizards	Atlanta Hawks	
Yudai Baba	September 19	Dallas Mavericks	Alvark Tokyo (Japan)	
Joe Johnson	September 19	Detroit Pistons	Houston Rockets	
Isaiah Taylor	September 19	Toronto Raptors	Cleveland Cavaliers (waived on October 13, 2018)	
Tyler Zeller	September 19	Denver Nuggets	Memphis Grizzlies	
Vince Carter	September 20	Atlanta Hawks		
Daryl Macon	September 20	Miami Heat	Dallas Mavericks (waived on July 26)	
Tahjere McCall	September 20	Atlanta Hawks	Long Island Nets (G League)	
Jalen Adams	September 23	New Orleans Pelicans	UConn (undrafted in 2019)	
Javon Bess	September 23	New Orleans Pelicans	Saint Louis (undrafted in 2019)	
Isaac Humphries	September 23	Orlando Magic	Atlanta Hawks	
Timothé Luwawu-Cabarrot	September 23	Cleveland Cavaliers	Chicago Bulls	
Norense Odiase	September 23	Phoenix Suns	Texas Tech (undrafted in 2019)	
Thabo Sefolosha	September 23	Houston Rockets	Utah Jazz	
Bryce Brown	September 24	Boston Celtics	Auburn (undrafted in 2019)	
Markel Brown	September 24	Oklahoma City Thunder	Darüşşafaka S.K. (Turkey)	
Perrion Callandret	September 24	Chicago Bulls	Idaho (undrafted in 2018)	
Kellen Dunham	September 24	Washington Wizards	Capital City Go-Go (G League)	
Matt Farrell	September 24	San Antonio Spurs	Delaware Blue Coats (G League)	
Tyler Ulis	September 24	Sacramento Kings	Chicago Bulls (waived on December 27, 2018)	.
Mike Cobbins	September 25	Washington Wizards	KK Split (Croatia)	
John Egbunu	September 25	Brooklyn Nets	Florida (undrafted in 2018)	
Haywood Highsmith****	September 25	Philadelphia 76ers (previously waived on June 24)		
C. J. Williams****	September 25	Brooklyn Nets	Minnesota Timberwolves	
Ryan Anderson	September 26	Houston Rockets	Miami Heat (waived on July 6)	
Jaron Blossomgame****	September 26	Houston Rockets	Cleveland Cavaliers	
John Bohannon	September 26	Boston Celtics	Maine Red Claws (G League)	
Chris Chiozza	September 26	Washington Wizards	Houston Rockets (waived on July 30)	
Milton Doyle	September 27	Chicago Bulls	UCAM Murcia (Spain)	
B. J. Johnson	September 27	Orlando Magic	Sacramento Kings (waived on July 19)	
Lance Thomas	September 27	Brooklyn Nets	New York Knicks (waived on June 29)	
DeVaughn Akoon-Purcell	September 29	Oklahoma City Thunder	ESSM Le Portel (France)	
Abdul Gaddy	September 29	Oklahoma City Thunder	Oklahoma City Blue (G League)	
Myke Henry	September 29	Oklahoma City Thunder	Ironi Nahariya (Israel)	
Eric Moreland	September 29	Oklahoma City Thunder	Toronto Raptors	
Keljin Blevins	September 30	Portland Trail Blazers	Montana State (undrafted in 2019)	
Marquese Chriss	September 30	Golden State Warriors	Cleveland Cavaliers	
Kaiser Gates	September 30	Boston Celtics	Windy City Bulls (G League)	
Yante Maten	September 30	Boston Celtics	Miami Heat (waived on July 29)	
Jorge Gutierrez	October 4	Denver Nuggets	CB Breogán (Spain)	
Elijah Millsap	October 4	Denver Nuggets	Gipuzkoa Basket (Spain)	
Simisola Shittu	October 4	Chicago Bulls	Vanderbilt (undrafted in 2019)	
David Stockton	October 4	Los Angeles Lakers	Medi Bayreuth (Germany)	
Kavion Pippen	October 5	Golden State Warriors	Southern Illinois (undrafted in 2019)	
Jon Davis	October 7	Orlando Magic	Charlotte (undrafted in 2019)	
Jordan Sibert	October 8	Atlanta Hawks	Erie BayHawks (G League)	
Walt Lemon Jr.	October 10	Indiana Pacers	Chicago Bulls (waived on July 6)	
Ray Spalding	October 10	Houston Rockets (claimed off waivers)	Atlanta Hawks (waived on October 8)	
Max Strus*****	October 11	Boston Celtics	DePaul (undrafted in 2019)	
Hollis Thompson	October 11	Sacramento Kings	Crailsheim Merlins (Germany)	
Kyle Collinsworth	October 12	Utah Jazz	Raptors 905 (G League)	
Galen Robinson Jr.	October 13	San Antonio Spurs	Houston (undrafted in 2019)	
Kenny Williams	October 13	San Antonio Spurs	UNC (undrafted in 2019)	
Tyus Battle	October 14	Minnesota Timberwolves	Syracuse (undrafted in 2019)	
Barry Brown Jr.	October 14	Minnesota Timberwolves	Kansas State (undrafted in 2019)	
Dusty Hannahs	October 14	Memphis Grizzlies (previously waived on April 4)		
Devin Cannady	October 15	Brooklyn Nets	Princeton (undrafted in 2019)	
Ahmad Caver	October 15	Memphis Grizzlies	Old Dominion (undrafted in 2019)	
Skyler Flatten	October 15	Miami Heat	South Dakota State (undrafted in 2019)	
Reggie Hearn	October 15	Los Angeles Lakers	Stockton Kings (G League)	
C. J. Massinburg	October 15	Brooklyn Nets	Buffalo (undrafted in 2019)	
Bubu Palo	October 15	Miami Heat	Sioux Falls Skyforce (G League)	
Jalen Jones	October 16	Washington Wizards	Kirolbet Baskonia (Spain)	
Anžejs Pasečņiks	October 16	Washington Wizards	Herbalife Gran Canaria (Spain)	
B. J. Taylor	October 16	Los Angeles Clippers	UCF (undrafted in 2019)	
Jarrod Uthoff	October 16	Memphis Grizzlies	Zenit Saint Petersburg (Russia)	
Marcus Allen	October 17	Los Angeles Lakers	South Bay Lakers (G League)	
Chad Brown	October 17	Dallas Mavericks	UCF (undrafted in 2019)	
Shaq Buchanan	October 17	Memphis Grizzlies	Murray State (undrafted in 2019)	
Dikembe Dixson	October 17	Washington Wizards	Capital City Go-Go (G League)	
Isaac Haas	October 17	Utah Jazz	Salt Lake City Stars (G League)	
Stephan Hicks	October 17	Indiana Pacers	Fort Wayne Mad Ants (G League)	
Zak Irvin	October 17	New York Knicks	Westchester Knicks (G League)	
Trevor Lacey	October 17	Milwaukee Bucks	Lokomotiv Kuban (Russia)	
Matur Maker	October 17	Houston Rockets	KK Zlatorog Laško (Slovenia)	
Matt Morgan	October 17	Toronto Raptors	Cornell (undrafted in 2019)	
Mike Scott	October 17	Utah Jazz	BM Slam Stal (Poland)	
Craig Sword	October 17	Detroit Pistons	Erie BayHawks (G League)	
Sedrick Barefield	October 18	Oklahoma City Thunder	Utah (undrafted in 2019)	
Justin Bibbs	October 18	Boston Celtics	Los Angeles Clippers	
Bennie Boatwright	October 18	Memphis Grizzlies	USC (undrafted in 2019)	
Jared Cunningham	October 18	Golden State Warriors	Basket Brescia Leonessa (Italy)	
Vincent Edwards****	October 18	Oklahoma City Thunder	Houston Rockets	
Kenny Gabriel	October 18	Atlanta Hawks	Türk Telekom B.K. (Turkey)	
Kadeem Jack	October 18	Oklahoma City Thunder	South Bay Lakers (G League)	
Tre'Shawn Thurman	October 18	Detroit Pistons	Nevada (undrafted in 2019)	
Dakarai Allen	October 19	Detroit Pistons	Grand Rapids Drive (G League)	
Shizz Alston	October 19	Philadelphia 76ers	Temple (undrafted in 2019)	
Jared Brownridge	October 19	Philadelphia 76ers	Delaware Blue Coats (G League)	
Aubrey Dawkins	October 19	New Orleans Pelicans	UCF (undrafted in 2019)	
Tyler Ennis	October 19	Toronto Raptors	Fenerbahçe (Turkey)	
Aaron Epps	October 19	Phoenix Suns	Élan Chalon (France)	
Terry Harris	October 19	Philadelphia 76ers	North Carolina A&T (undrafted in 2019)	
Tra-Deon Hollins	October 19	Detroit Pistons	St. John's Edge (Canada)	
Jemerrio Jones	October 19	Milwaukee Bucks	Washington Wizards (waived on October 16)	
Anthony Lawrence	October 19	Utah Jazz	UCF (undrafted in 2019)	
Xavier Munford	October 19	Philadelphia 76ers	Delaware Blue Coats (G League)	
Mark Ogden Jr.	October 19	Atlanta Hawks	Olimpi Tbilisi (Georgia)	
Dorian Pickens	October 19	Boston Celtics	Limburg Towers (Belgium)	
Julian Washburn	October 19	Philadelphia 76ers	Golden State Warriors (waived on July 17)	
Troy Williams****	October 19	Phoenix Suns	Sacramento Kings	
Wenyen Gabriel****	October 21	Sacramento Kings (previously on a two-way contract)		
Alfonzo McKinnie	October 21	Cleveland Cavaliers (claimed off waivers)	Golden State Warriors (waived on October 19)	
Tyrone Wallace	October 23	Atlanta Hawks (claimed off waivers)	Minnesota Timberwolves (waived on October 21)	
Amile Jefferson****	November 1	Orlando Magic (previously on a two-way contract)		
Iman Shumpert	November 13	Brooklyn Nets	Houston Rockets	
Carmelo Anthony	November 19	Portland Trail Blazers	Chicago Bulls (waived on February 1)	
Juwan Morgan	November 21	Utah Jazz	Salt Lake City Stars (G League)	
Gary Payton II	December 23	Washington Wizards	South Bay Lakers (G League)	
Rayjon Tucker	December 24	Utah Jazz	Wisconsin Herd (G League)	
Johnathan Williams	December 26	Washington Wizards	Maccabi Rishon LeZion (Israel)	
Chris Clemons****	December 27	Houston Rockets (previously on a two-way contract)		
Tyler Cook****	January 3	Cleveland Cavaliers (previously on a two-way contract)		
Justin Anderson	January 6	Brooklyn Nets (10-day contract)	Raptors 905 (G League)	
Paul Watson	January 6	Atlanta Hawks (10-day contract)	Raptors 905 (G League)	
Tyler Cook	January 9	Cleveland Cavaliers (10-day contract; previously waived on January 6)		
Alfonzo McKinnie	January 9	Cleveland Cavaliers (10-day contract; previously waived on January 6)		
Josh Magette****	January 11	Orlando Magic (10-day contract; previously on a two-way contract)		
Anžejs Pasečņiks****	January 12	Washington Wizards (previously on a two-way contract)		
Gary Clark	January 14	Orlando Magic (10-day contract)	Houston Rockets (waived on January 7)	
Damion Lee****	January 15	Golden State Warriors (previously on a two-way contract)		
Timothé Luwawu-Cabarrot****	January 15	Brooklyn Nets (10-day contract; previously on a two-way contract)		
Chris Silva****	January 15	Miami Heat (previously on a two-way contract)		
Tyler Cook	January 20	Cleveland Cavaliers (second 10-day contract)		
Alfonzo McKinnie	January 23	Cleveland Cavaliers (second 10-day contract; last contract ended January 19)		
Timothé Luwawu-Cabarrot	January 25	Brooklyn Nets (second 10-day contract)		
Gary Clark	January 29	Orlando Magic (second 10-day contract; last contract ended January 24)		
Marques Bolden	January 30	Cleveland Cavaliers (10-day contract)	Canton Charge (G League)	
Eric Mika	February 1	Sacramento Kings (10-day contract)	Stockton Kings (G League)	
Ky Bowman****	February 7	Golden State Warriors (previously on a two-way contract)		
Marquese Chriss****	February 7	Golden State Warriors (previously on a two-way contract)		
Timothé Luwawu-Cabarrot	February 7	Brooklyn Nets (signed for multi-year contract; last 10-day contract ended February 4)		
Norvel Pelle****	February 7	Philadelphia 76ers (previously on a two-way contract)		
Juan Toscano-Anderson	February 7	Golden State Warriors	Santa Cruz Warriors (G League)	
Gary Clark	February 8	Orlando Magic (signed for rest of season)		
Alfonzo McKinnie	February 8	Cleveland Cavaliers (signed for multi-year contract; last 10-day contract ended February 2)		
Zach Norvell Jr.	February 8	Golden State Warriors (10-day contract)	South Bay Lakers (G League)	
Jeremy Pargo	February 8	Golden State Warriors (10-day contract)	Santa Cruz Warriors (G League)	
J. P. Macura	February 9	Cleveland Cavaliers (10-day contract)	Canton Charge (G League)	
Malik Newman	February 9	Cleveland Cavaliers (10-day contract)	Canton Charge (G League)	
Marvin Williams	February 10	Milwaukee Bucks	Charlotte Hornets (waived on February 8)	
Michael Kidd-Gilchrist	February 11	Dallas Mavericks	Charlotte Hornets (waived on February 8)	
Jonah Bolden	February 12	Phoenix Suns (10-day contract)	Philadelphia 76ers (waived on February 7)	
Brandon Goodwin****	February 12	Atlanta Hawks (previously on a two-way contract)		
Jeff Green	February 18	Houston Rockets (10-day contract)	Utah Jazz (waived on December 24)	
DeMarre Carroll	February 20	Houston Rockets (signed for rest of season)	San Antonio Spurs (waived on February 18)	
Reggie Jackson	February 20	Los Angeles Clippers (signed for rest of season)	Detroit Pistons (waived on February 18)	
Joe Chealey	February 21	Charlotte Hornets (10-day contract)	Greensboro Swarm (G League)	
Dusty Hannahs	February 21	Memphis Grizzlies (10-day contract)	Memphis Hustle (G League)	
Derrick Walton	February 21	Detroit Pistons (10-day contract)	Atlanta Hawks (waived on February 6)	
Donta Hall	February 22	Detroit Pistons (10-day contract)	Grand Rapids Drive (G League)	
Dragan Bender	February 23	Golden State Warriors (10-day contract)	Milwaukee Bucks (waived on February 10)	
Markieff Morris	February 23	Los Angeles Lakers	Detroit Pistons (waived on February 21)	
Mychal Mulder	February 27	Golden State Warriors (10-day contract)	Sioux Falls Skyforce (G League)	
Jarrod Uthoff	February 27	Memphis Grizzlies (10-day contract)	Memphis Hustle (G League)	
Jeff Green	February 28	Houston Rockets (signed for rest of season)		
Anthony Tolliver	March 2	Memphis Grizzlies (10-day contract)	Sacramento Kings (waived on February 29)	
Joe Chealey	March 3	Charlotte Hornets (second 10-day contract; last 10-day contract ended March 2)		
Donta Hall	March 3	Detroit Pistons (second 10-day contract)		
Chasson Randle	March 3	Golden State Warriors (10-day contract)	Tianjin Pioneers (China)	
Sir'Dominic Pointer	March 4	Cleveland Cavaliers (10-day contract)	Canton Charge (G League)	
Jordan McRae	March 4	Detroit Pistons (claimed off of waviers)	Denver Nuggets (waived on March 1)	
Dragan Bender	March 5	Golden State Warriors (second 10-day contract; last 10-day contract ended March 3)		
Troy Daniels	March 5	Denver Nuggets	Los Angeles Lakers (waived on March 1)	
Dion Waiters	March 6	Los Angeles Lakers	Memphis Grizzlies (waived on February 9)	
Sheldon Mac	March 8	Cleveland Cavaliers (10-day contract)	Canton Charge (G League)	
Jontay Porter	March 8	Memphis Grizzlies	Missouri (undrafted in 2019)	
Joakim Noah	March 9	Los Angeles Clippers (10-day contract)	Memphis Grizzlies	
Mychal Mulder	March 10	Golden State Warriors (signed for multi-year contract; last 10-day contract ended March 8)		
Corey Brewer	June 23	Sacramento Kings (signed for rest of season; last contract ended June 30, 2019)		
David Nwaba	June 23	Houston Rockets (signed for multi-year contract)	Brooklyn Nets (waived on January 3)	
Anthony Tolliver	June 23	Memphis Grizzlies (signed for rest of season)		
Luguentz Dort****	June 24	Oklahoma City Thunder (previously on a two-way contract)		
Tyler Johnson	June 24	Brooklyn Nets (signed for rest of season)	Phoenix Suns (waived on February 10)	
Tyler Zeller	June 24	San Antonio Spurs (signed for multi-year contract)	Denver Nuggets (waived on October 18)	
Justin Patton	June 26	Detroit Pistons	Wisconsin Herd (G League)	
Theo Pinson	June 26	New York Knicks (claimed off waivers)	Brooklyn Nets (waived on June 23)	
Joakim Noah	June 27	Los Angeles Clippers (signed for multi-year contract)		
Jordan Bell	June 29	Cleveland Cavaliers (signed for multi-year contract)	Capital City Go-Go (G League)	
Dean Wade****	June 29	Cleveland Cavaliers (previously on a two-way contract)		
PJ Dozier****	June 30	Denver Nuggets (previously on a two-way contract)		
Cameron Payne	June 30	Phoenix Suns (signed for multi-year contract)	Texas Legends (G League)	

* Player option
** Team option
*** Early termination option
**** Previously on a two-way contract
***** Converted two-way contract to full contract

=== Substitute players ===
Per recent NBA rules implemented as of the 2019–20 season, teams are permitted to substitute players for the resumption of the 2019–20 season, in Orlando "bubble".

Player	Date signed	Team	Replaced player	Former team	Ref
Ryan Broekhoff	June 27	Philadelphia 76ers	(empty two-way roster spot)	Dallas Mavericks (waived on February 11)	
Devon Hall	June 27	Oklahoma City Thunder	(empty two-way roster spot)	Oklahoma City Blue (G League)	
Jaylen Adams	July 1	Portland Trail Blazers	Trevor Ariza	Wisconsin Herd (G League)	
Trey Burke	July 1	Dallas Mavericks	Jalen Brunson	Philadelphia 76ers (waived on February 6)	
Jerian Grant	July 1	Washington Wizards	Dāvis Bertāns	Capital City Go-Go (G League)	
J. R. Smith	July 1	Los Angeles Lakers	Avery Bradley	Cleveland Cavaliers (waived on July 15, 2019)	
Luc Mbah a Moute	July 6	Houston Rockets	Thabo Sefolosha	Los Angeles Clippers (waived on April 7, 2019)	
Sindarius Thornwell	July 6	New Orleans Pelicans	Darius Miller	Rio Grande Valley Vipers (G League)	
Michael Beasley	July 9	Brooklyn Nets	Taurean Prince	Guangdong Southern Tigers (China)	
Jamal Crawford	July 9	Brooklyn Nets	Spencer Dinwiddie	Phoenix Suns (contract ended June 30, 2019)	
Donta Hall	July 10	Brooklyn Nets	Nic Claxton	Detroit Pistons (second 10-day contract ended March 12)	
Lance Thomas	July 14	Brooklyn Nets	DeAndre Jordan	Brooklyn Nets (previously waived on October 18, 2019)	
Jarrod Uthoff	July 17	Washington Wizards	Bradley Beal	Memphis Hustle (G League)	
Justin Anderson	July 18	Brooklyn Nets	Michael Beasley	Long Island Nets (G League)	

=== Two-way contracts ===
Per recent NBA rules implemented as of the 2017–18 season, teams are permitted to have two two-way players on their roster at any given time, in addition to their 15-man regular season roster. A two-way player will provide services primarily to the team's G League affiliate, but can spend up to 45 days with the parent NBA team. Only players with four or fewer years of NBA experience are able to sign two-way contracts, which can be for either one season or two. Players entering training camp for a team have a chance to convert their training camp deal into a two-way contract if they prove themselves worthy enough for it. Teams also have the option to convert a two-way contract into a regular, minimum-salary NBA contract, at which point the player becomes a regular member of the parent NBA team. Two-way players are not eligible for NBA playoff rosters, so a team must convert any two-way players it wants to use in the playoffs, waiving another player in the process.

Player	Date signed	Team	School / Club team	Ref
Brian Bowen	July 1	Indiana Pacers	Sydney Kings (Australia) (undrafted in 2019)	
Charlie Brown Jr.	July 1	Atlanta Hawks	St. Joseph's (undrafted in 2019)	
Jaylen Hoard	July 1	Portland Trail Blazers	Wake Forest (undrafted in 2019)	
Zach Norvell Jr.	July 1	Los Angeles Lakers	Gonzaga (undrafted in 2019)	
Norvel Pelle	July 1	Philadelphia 76ers	Homenetmen Beirut (Lebanon)	
Dean Wade	July 1	Cleveland Cavaliers	Kansas State (undrafted in 2019)	
Adam Mokoka	July 2	Chicago Bulls	Mega Bemax (Serbia) (undrafted in 2019)	
Garrison Mathews	July 3	Washington Wizards	Lipscomb (undrafted in 2019)	
Louis King	July 4	Detroit Pistons	Oregon (undrafted in 2019)	
Naz Reid	July 4	Minnesota Timberwolves	LSU (undrafted in 2019)	
Luguentz Dort	July 6	Oklahoma City Thunder	Arizona State (undrafted in 2019)	
Jordan Bone	July 7	Detroit Pistons	Tennessee	
Kyle Guy	July 7	Sacramento Kings	Virginia	
John Konchar	July 7	Memphis Grizzlies	Purdue Fort Wayne (undrafted in 2019)	
Marial Shayok	July 7	Philadelphia 76ers	Iowa State	
Quinndary Weatherspoon	July 8	San Antonio Spurs	Mississippi State	
Amir Coffey	July 9	Los Angeles Clippers	Minnesota (undrafted in 2019)	
Robert Franks	July 9	Charlotte Hornets	Washington State (undrafted in 2019)	
Jarrell Brantley	July 16	Utah Jazz	College of Charleston	
Justin Wright-Foreman	July 16	Utah Jazz	Hofstra	
Henry Ellenson**	July 17	Brooklyn Nets	New York Knicks	
Jared Harper	July 17	Phoenix Suns	Auburn (undrafted in 2019)	
Max Strus	July 18	Boston Celtics	DePaul (undrafted in 2019)	
Jordan McLaughlin	July 20	Minnesota Timberwolves	Long Island Nets (G League)	
Kostas Antetokounmpo	July 21	Los Angeles Lakers (claimed off waivers)	Dallas Mavericks (waived on July 19)	
Cameron Reynolds	July 22	Milwaukee Bucks	Minnesota Timberwolves (waived on June 28)	
Ky Bowman	July 23	Golden State Warriors	Boston College (undrafted in 2019)	
Zylan Cheatham	July 23	New Orleans Pelicans	Arizona State (undrafted in 2019)	
Josh Gray	July 23	New Orleans Pelicans	Changwon LG Sakers (South Korea)	
Josh Magette	July 23	Orlando Magic	CB Gran Canaria (Spain)	
Antonius Cleveland	July 24	Dallas Mavericks	Santa Cruz Warriors (G League)	
Frank Mason III	July 24	Milwaukee Bucks	Sacramento Kings (waived on July 4)	
Johnathan Motley****	July 24	Los Angeles Clippers		
Tremont Waters	July 25	Boston Celtics	LSU	
Damion Lee**** (RFA)	July 29	Golden State Warriors		
Josh Reaves	July 29	Dallas Mavericks	Penn State (undrafted in 2019)	
Amile Jefferson****	July 30	Orlando Magic		
Naz Mitrou-Long****	July 31	Indiana Pacers	Utah Jazz	
Brandon Goodwin****	August 5	Atlanta Hawks	Denver Nuggets	
Kelan Martin	August 8	Minnesota Timberwolves	MHP Riesen Ludwigsburg (Germany)	
Tyler Cook	August 12	Denver Nuggets	Iowa (undrafted in 2019)	
Bol Bol	September 4	Denver Nuggets	Oregon	
Devon Hall	September 4	Oklahoma City Thunder	Oklahoma City Blue (G League)	
Ahmed Hill	September 5	Charlotte Hornets	Virginia Tech (undrafted in 2019)	
Tacko Fall	October 13	Boston Celtics	UCF (undrafted in 2019)	
P. J. Dozier****	October 17	Denver Nuggets	Boston Celtics	
Moses Brown	October 18	Portland Trail Blazers	UCLA (undrafted in 2019)	
Tyler Cook	October 18	Cleveland Cavaliers (claimed off waivers)	Denver Nuggets (waived on October 16)	
Chris Silva	October 18	Miami Heat	South Carolina (undrafted in 2019)	
Daryl Macon	October 19	Miami Heat	Dallas Mavericks (waived on July 26)	
Jalen McDaniels	October 19	Charlotte Hornets	San Diego State	
Chris Chiozza	October 20	Washington Wizards	Houston Rockets (waived on July 30)	
Michael Frazier II	October 20	Houston Rockets (previously waived on October 19)		
Kobi Simmons	October 20	Charlotte Hornets	Cleveland Cavaliers (waived on February 4)	
Oshae Brissett	October 21	Toronto Raptors	Syracuse (undrafted in 2019)	
Chris Clemons	October 21	Houston Rockets	Campbell (undrafted in 2019)	
DaQuan Jeffries	October 21	Sacramento Kings (claimed off waivers)	Orlando Magic (waived on October 19)	
Ronshad Shabazz	October 21	Houston Rockets	Appalachian State (undrafted in 2019)	
Shamorie Ponds	October 22	Toronto Raptors	Houston Rockets (waived on October 19)	
Max Strus	October 22	Chicago Bulls	Boston Celtics (waived on October 19)	
Timothé Luwawu-Cabarrot	October 23	Brooklyn Nets	Cleveland Cavaliers (waived on October 15)	
Ivan Rabb	October 23	New York Knicks	Memphis Grizzlies (waived on October 19)	
B. J. Johnson	November 4	Orlando Magic	Lakeland Magic (G League)	
Devontae Cacok	December 12	Los Angeles Lakers	South Bay Lakers (G League)	
Kevin Hervey	December 12	Oklahoma City Thunder	Oklahoma City Blue (G League)	
Anžejs Pasečņiks	December 18	Washington Wizards	Capital City Go-Go (G League)	
William Howard	December 27	Houston Rockets	Salt Lake City Stars (G League)	
Chris Chiozza	January 4	Brooklyn Nets	Capital City Go-Go (G League)	
Levi Randolph	January 6	Cleveland Cavaliers	Canton Charge (G League)	
Gabe Vincent	January 8	Miami Heat	Stockton Kings (G League)	
Vic Law	January 11	Orlando Magic	Lakeland Magic (G League)	
Johnathan Williams	January 12	Washington Wizards (previously waived on January 4)		
Kenny Wooten	January 14	New York Knicks	Westchester Knicks (G League)	
Kyle Alexander	January 15	Miami Heat	Sioux Falls Skyforce (G League)	
Marquese Chriss	January 15	Golden State Warriors (previously waived on January 7)		
Matt Mooney	January 15	Cleveland Cavaliers	Memphis Hustle (G League)	
Jeremiah Martin	January 15	Brooklyn Nets	Sioux Falls Skyforce (G League)	
Tariq Owens	January 15	Phoenix Suns	Northern Arizona Suns (G League)	
Ray Spalding	January 15	Charlotte Hornets	Rio Grande Valley Vipers (G League)	
Paul Watson	January 15	Toronto Raptors	Atlanta Hawks (released from 10-day contract on January 15)	
Jared Harper	June 25	New York Knicks (claimed off waivers)	Phoenix Suns (waived on March 12)	
Tyler Cook	June 30	Denver Nuggets	Oklahoma City Blue (G League)	

=== Going to other North American leagues ===
*	Denotes G League players who returned to their former team

Player	Date signed	New team	New league	NBA team	NBA contract status	Ref
Trevon Duval	October 26	Iowa Wolves	NBA G League	Houston Rockets	Unrestricted free agent	
Jawun Evans	November 6	Raptors 905	NBA G League	Oklahoma City Thunder	Unrestricted free agent	
Deyonta Davis*	November 7	Santa Cruz Warriors	NBA G League	Houston Rockets	Unrestricted free agent	
Sheldon Mac	November 7	Canton Charge	NBA G League	Atlanta Hawks	Unrestricted free agent	
Brandon Sampson*	November 7	Rio Grande Valley Vipers	NBA G League	Chicago Bulls	Unrestricted free agent	
Devon Hall*	December 16	Oklahoma City Blue	NBA G League	Oklahoma City Thunder	Unrestricted free agent	
Zach Norvell Jr.*	December 17	South Bay Lakers	NBA G League	Los Angeles Lakers	Unrestricted free agent	
Chris Chiozza*	December 21	Capital City Go-Go	NBA G League	Washington Wizards	Unrestricted free agent	
Isaiah Taylor*	December 29	Rio Grande Valley Vipers	NBA G League	Toronto Raptors	Unrestricted free agent	
Levi Randolph*	January 14	Canton Charge	NBA G League	Cleveland Cavaliers	Unrestricted free agent	
Justin Anderson*	January 16	Raptors 905	NBA G League	Brooklyn Nets	Unrestricted free agent	
Daryl Macon*	January 17	Sioux Falls Skyforce	NBA G League	Miami Heat	Unrestricted free agent	
Josh Magette*	January 18	Lakeland Magic	NBA G League	Orlando Magic	Unrestricted free agent	
Henry Ellenson*	January 21	Long Island Nets	NBA G League	Brooklyn Nets	Unrestricted free agent	
Justin Robinson	January 21	Delaware Blue Coats	NBA G League	Washington Wizards	Unrestricted free agent	
Ivan Rabb*	January 22	Westchester Knicks	NBA G League	New York Knicks	Unrestricted free agent	
Tyler Cook*	January 29	Canton Charge	NBA G League	Cleveland Cavaliers	Unrestricted free agent	
Ike Anigbogu	January 30	Erie BayHawks	NBA G League	Indiana Pacers	Unrestricted free agent	
Robert Franks	February 3	Stockton Kings	NBA G League	Charlotte Hornets	Unrestricted free agent	
Eric Mika*	February 8	Stockton Kings	NBA G League	Sacramento Kings	Unrestricted free agent	
Marques Bolden*	February 9	Canton Charge	NBA G League	Cleveland Cavaliers	Unrestricted free agent	
Jeremy Pargo*	February 20	Santa Cruz Warriors	NBA G League	Golden State Warriors	Unrestricted free agent	
Justin Patton	February 20	Wisconsin Herd	NBA G League	Dallas Mavericks	Unrestricted free agent	
Zach Norvell Jr.	February 21	Santa Cruz Warriors	NBA G League	Golden State Warriors	Unrestricted free agent	
Malik Newman*	February 23	Canton Charge	NBA G League	Cleveland Cavaliers	Unrestricted free agent	
J.P. Macura*	February 24	Canton Charge	NBA G League	Cleveland Cavaliers	Unrestricted free agent	
Jonathon Simmons	February 25	Santa Cruz Warriors	NBA G League	Washington Wizards	Unrestricted free agent	
Dusty Hannahs*	February 27	Memphis Hustle	NBA G League	Memphis Grizzlies	Unrestricted free agent	
Amile Jefferson*	February 28	Lakeland Magic	NBA G League	Orlando Magic	Unrestricted free agent	
Jarrod Uthoff*	March 8	Memphis Hustle	NBA G League	Memphis Grizzlies	Unrestricted free agent	
Tyrone Wallace*	March 9	Agua Caliente Clippers	NBA G League	Atlanta Hawks	Unrestricted free agent	
Jordan Bell	March 11	Capital City Go-Go	NBA G League	Memphis Grizzlies	Unrestricted free agent	

=== Going overseas ===
*	Denotes international players who returned to their home country

Player	Date signed	New team	New country	NBA team	NBA contract status	Ref
Aaron Brooks	June 20	Illawarra Hawks	Australia	Minnesota Timberwolves	Unrestricted free agent	
JaKarr Sampson	July 4	Shandong Heroes	China	Chicago Bulls	Unrestricted free agent	
Alan Williams	July 5	Shaanxi Xinda	China	Brooklyn Nets	Unrestricted free agent	
Nikola Mirotić*	July 6	Barcelona Bàsquet	Spain	Milwaukee Bucks	Unrestricted free agent	
Dairis Bertāns	July 8	Khimki	Russia	New Orleans Pelicans	Unrestricted free agent	
Álex Abrines*	July 12	Barcelona Bàsquet	Spain	Oklahoma City Thunder	Unrestricted free agent	
Miloš Teodosić	July 13	Virtus Bologna	Italy	Los Angeles Clippers	Unrestricted free agent	
Jimmer Fredette	July 15	Panathinaikos B.C.	Greece	Phoenix Suns	Unrestricted free agent	
Didi Louzada	July 17	Sydney Kings	Australia	New Orleans Pelicans	Unsigned draft pick	
Kosta Koufos	July 19	CSKA Moscow	Russia	Sacramento Kings	Unrestricted free agent	
Tyler Cavanaugh	July 21	Alba Berlin	Germany	Utah Jazz	Unrestricted free agent	
George King	July 21	Aquila Basket Trento	Italy	Phoenix Suns	Unrestricted free agent	
Wesley Johnson	July 22	Panathinaikos B.C.	Greece	Washington Wizards	Unrestricted free agent	
Andrew Bogut*	July 24	Sydney Kings	Australia	Golden State Warriors	Unrestricted free agent	
Billy Garrett Jr.	July 25	Élan Chalon	France	New York Knicks	Unrestricted free agent	
Shelvin Mack	July 25	Olimpia Milano	Italy	Charlotte Hornets	Unrestricted free agent	
Greg Monroe	July 25	Bayern Munich	Germany	Philadelphia 76ers	Unrestricted free agent	
Donatas Motiejūnas	July 25	Shanghai Sharks	China	San Antonio Spurs	Unrestricted free agent	
R. J. Hunter	July 26	Turk Telekom	Turkey	Boston Celtics	Unrestricted free agent	
Mitch Creek*	July 29	South East Melbourne Phoenix	Australia	Minnesota Timberwolves	Unrestricted free agent	
Ekpe Udoh	July 29	Beijing Ducks	China	Utah Jazz	Unrestricted free agent	
Ian Clark	July 30	Xinjiang Flying Tigers	China	New Orleans Pelicans	Unrestricted free agent	
Bonzie Colson	July 30	Darüşşafaka Tekfen	Turkey	Milwaukee Bucks	Unrestricted free agent	
Johnathan Williams	July 30	Maccabi Rishon LeZion	Israel	Los Angeles Lakers	Unrestricted free agent	
Timofey Mozgov*	July 31	Khimki	Russia	Orlando Magic	Unrestricted free agent	
Ron Baker	August 1	CSKA Moscow	Russia	Washington Wizards	Unrestricted free agent	
Nik Stauskas	August 1	Kirolbet Baskonia	Spain	Cleveland Cavaliers	Unrestricted free agent	
Sam Dekker	August 3	PBC Lokomotiv-Kuban	Russia	Washington Wizards	Unrestricted free agent	
Jordan Loyd	August 3	Valencia Basket	Spain	Toronto Raptors	Unrestricted free agent	
Jerian Grant	August 4	Qingdao Eagles	China	Orlando Magic	Unrestricted free agent	
Isaiah Hicks	August 4	BC Avtodor Saratov	Russia	New York Knicks	Unrestricted free agent	
Ángel Delgado	August 8	Beijing Royal Fighters	China	Los Angeles Clippers	Unrestricted free agent	
Lance Stephenson	August 10	Liaoning Flying Leopards	China	Los Angeles Lakers	Unrestricted free agent	
Alex Poythress	August 12	Jilin Northeast Tigers	China	Atlanta Hawks	Unrestricted free agent	
Chasson Randle	August 13	Tianjin Pioneers	China	Washington Wizards	Unrestricted free agent	
Omri Casspi*	August 14	Maccabi Tel Aviv	Israel	Memphis Grizzlies	Unrestricted free agent	
Jonas Jerebko	August 14	Khimki	Russia	Golden State Warriors	Unrestricted free agent	
Tarik Phillip	August 15	Tofaş S.K.	Turkey	Washington Wizards	Unrestricted free agent	
Zhou Qi*	August 15	Xinjiang Flying Tigers	China	Houston Rockets	Unrestricted free agent	
Guerschon Yabusele	August 16	Nanjing Monkey Kings	China	Boston Celtics	Unrestricted free agent	
Tyler Dorsey	August 17	Maccabi Tel Aviv	Israel	Memphis Grizzlies	Unrestricted free agent	
Jerryd Bayless	August 19	Sichuan Blue Whales	China	Minnesota Timberwolves	Unrestricted free agent	
Wayne Selden Jr.	August 21	Shandong Heroes	China	Chicago Bulls	Unrestricted free agent	
Isaiah Canaan	August 22	Shandong Heroes	China	Milwaukee Bucks	Unrestricted free agent	
Jeremy Lin	August 27	Beijing Ducks	China	Toronto Raptors	Unrestricted free agent	
Charles Cooke	August 31	Universo Treviso Basket	Italy	Miami Heat	Unrestricted free agent	
Ben Moore	August 31	Galatasaray	Turkey	San Antonio Spurs	Unrestricted free agent	
Salah Mejri	September 10	Liaoning Flying Leopards	China	Dallas Mavericks	Unrestricted free agent	
Jared Terrell	September 14	Hapoel Eilat	Israel	Minnesota Timberwolves	Unrestricted free agent	
Antonio Blakeney	September 24	Jiangsu Dragons	China	Chicago Bulls	Unrestricted free agent	
Isaiah Whitehead	October 10	BC Astana	Kazakhstan	Detroit Pistons	Unrestricted free agent	
Eric Moreland	October 21	Shanxi Loongs	China	Oklahoma City Thunder	Unrestricted free agent	
Isaiah Briscoe	October 25	ratiopharm Ulm	Germany	Orlando Magic	Unrestricted free agent	
Troy Caupain	November 3	Hapoel Holon	Israel	Portland Trail Blazers	Unrestricted free agent	
Kenneth Faried	November 6	Zhejiang Lions	China	Houston Rockets	Unrestricted free agent	
Jorge Gutiérrez	November 6	Hamburg Towers	Germany	Denver Nuggets	Unrestricted free agent	
London Perrantes	November 12	Bahçeşehir Basketbol	Turkey	Portland Trail Blazers	Unrestricted free agent	
Jonathan Gibson	November 13	Jiangsu Dragons	China	Boston Celtics	Unrestricted free agent	
Cameron Payne	November 13	Shanxi Loongs	China	Toronto Raptors	Unrestricted free agent	
Jarell Martin	November 16	Shenzhen Aviators	China	Cleveland Cavaliers	Unrestricted free agent	
Emeka Okafor	November 22	Hyundai Mobis Phoebus	South Korea	Philadelphia 76ers	Unrestricted free agent	
Brandon Rush	November 22	Larisa	Greece	Portland Trail Blazers	Unrestricted free agent	
Dante Cunningham	December 11	Fujian Sturgeons	China	San Antonio Spurs	Unrestricted free agent	
Miles Plumlee	December 13	Zhejiang Lions	China	Memphis Grizzlies	Unrestricted free agent	
Troy Williams	December 14	Carpegna Prosciutto Basket Pesaro	Italy	Phoenix Suns	Unrestricted free agent	
Stanton Kidd	December 20	Melbourne United	Australia	Utah Jazz	Unrestricted free agent	
John Jenkins	January 6	Jiangsu Dragons	China	New York Knicks	Unrestricted free agent	
Kalin Lucas	February 14	Crvena zvezda	Serbia	Detroit Pistons	Unrestricted free agent	
Rawle Alkins	February 27	FC Porto	Portugal	Chicago Bulls	Unrestricted free agent	
William Howard*	July 16	LDLC ASVEL	France	Houston Rockets	Restricted free agent	
Kadeem Allen	July 20	JL Bourg	France	New York Knicks	Unrestricted free agent	
Ante Žižić	August 25	Maccabi Tel Aviv	Israel	Cleveland Cavaliers	Unrestricted free agent	
Johnathan Williams	September 6	Galatasaray Doğa Sigorta	Turkey	Washington Wizards	Unrestricted free agent	
Wilson Chandler	September 8	Zhejiang Lions	China	Brooklyn Nets	Unrestricted free agent	

=== Waived ===
Player	Date waived	Former team	Ref
Deyonta Davis	June 10	Atlanta Hawks	
Haywood Highsmith^{†}	June 24	Philadelphia 76ers	
Cameron Reynolds	June 28	Minnesota Timberwolves	
Lance Thomas	June 29	New York Knicks	
George Hill	July 1	Milwaukee Bucks	
Raul Neto	July 1	Utah Jazz	
Tony Parker	July 2	Charlotte Hornets	
Frank Mason III	July 4	Sacramento Kings	
Ryan Anderson	July 6	Miami Heat	
Avery Bradley	July 6	Memphis Grizzlies	
Shaquille Harrison	July 6	Chicago Bulls	
Walt Lemon Jr.	July 6	Chicago Bulls	
Timofey Mozgov	July 6	Orlando Magic	
Sindarius Thornwell	July 6	Los Angeles Clippers	
Tyrone Wallace	July 6	Los Angeles Clippers	
Dairis Bertāns	July 7	New Orleans Pelicans	
Jonathon Simmons	July 7	Washington Wizards	
Kyle Korver	July 8	Phoenix Suns	
Jon Leuer	July 8	Milwaukee Bucks	
Shaun Livingston	July 10	Golden State Warriors	
Guerschon Yabusele	July 10	Boston Celtics	
Jaylen Adams	July 13	Atlanta Hawks	
J. R. Smith	July 15	Cleveland Cavaliers	
Christian Wood	July 15	New Orleans Pelicans	
Julian Washburn^{†}	July 17	Golden State Warriors	
Kostas Antetokounmpo^{†}	July 19	Dallas Mavericks	
B. J. Johnson	July 19	Sacramento Kings	
Bonzie Colson^{†}	July 21	Milwaukee Bucks	
Donte Grantham^{†}	July 25	Oklahoma City Thunder	
Daryl Macon	July 26	Dallas Mavericks	
Yante Maten	July 29	Miami Heat	
Chris Chiozza	July 30	Houston Rockets	
Deyonta Davis	July 30	Houston Rockets	
Thomas Welsh^{†}	July 30	Denver Nuggets	
Patrick Patterson	August 1	Oklahoma City Thunder	
Jordan Loyd^{†}	August 2	Toronto Raptors	
Tarik Phillip	August 15	Washington Wizards	
Dwight Howard	August 24	Memphis Grizzlies	
Aric Holman	August 26	Los Angeles Lakers	
Malik Newman	September 3	Cleveland Cavaliers	
Levi Randolph	September 3	Cleveland Cavaliers	
Antonio Blakeney	September 9	Chicago Bulls	
Alex Robinson	September 23	Cleveland Cavaliers	
Kellen Dunham	September 24	Washington Wizards	
Jeff Ledbetter	September 24	San Antonio Spurs	
Mike Cobbins	September 26	Washington Wizards	
William McDowell-White	September 26	Houston Rockets	
Markel Brown	September 26	Oklahoma City Thunder	
John Bohannon	September 28	Boston Celtics	
Bryce Brown	September 28	Boston Celtics	
Matt Farrell	September 29	San Antonio Spurs	
Ryan Anderson	November 18	Houston Rockets	
Pau Gasol	November 20	Portland Trail Blazers	
Stanton Kidd	November 21	Utah Jazz	
Zach Norvell^{†}	December 11	Los Angeles Lakers	
Devon Hall^{†}	December 12	Oklahoma City Thunder	
Iman Shumpert	December 12	Brooklyn Nets	
Tyrone Wallace	December 14	Atlanta Hawks	
Chris Chiozza^{†}	December 17	Washington Wizards	
Jeff Green	December 24	Utah Jazz	
Henry Ellenson^{†}	January 3	Brooklyn Nets	
David Nwaba	January 3	Brooklyn Nets	
Justin Robinson	January 5	Washington Wizards	
Johnathan Williams	January 5	Washington Wizards	
Tyler Cook	January 6	Cleveland Cavaliers	
Alfonzo McKinnie	January 6	Cleveland Cavaliers	
Marquese Chriss	January 7	Golden State Warriors	
Gary Clark	January 7	Houston Rockets	
Daryl Macon^{†}	January 8	Miami Heat	
C. J. Miles	January 12	Washington Wizards	
Levi Randolph^{†}	January 12	Cleveland Cavaliers	
Ivan Rabb^{†}	January 13	New York Knicks	
Josh Magette	January 14	Orlando Magic	
Paul Watson	January 14	Atlanta Hawks	
Justin Anderson	January 15	Brooklyn Nets	
Robert Franks^{†}	January 15	Charlotte Hornets	
Shamorie Ponds^{†}	January 15	Toronto Raptors	
Justin Patton	January 25	Dallas Mavericks	
Chandler Parsons	February 5	Atlanta Hawks	
Trey Burke	February 6	Philadelphia 76ers	
Tim Frazier	February 6	Detroit Pistons	
Amile Jefferson	February 6	Orlando Magic	
Eric Mika	February 6	Sacramento Kings	
Nenê	February 6	Atlanta Hawks	
Derrick Walton	February 6	Atlanta Hawks	
Jonah Bolden	February 7	Philadelphia 76ers	
Gerald Green	February 7	Denver Nuggets	
Michael Kidd-Gilchrist	February 8	Charlotte Hornets	
Isaiah Thomas	February 8	Los Angeles Clippers	
Marvin Williams	February 8	Charlotte Hornets	
Dion Waiters	February 9	Memphis Grizzlies	
Dragan Bender	February 10	Milwaukee Bucks	
Tyler Johnson	February 10	Phoenix Suns	
Ryan Broekhoff	February 11	Dallas Mavericks	
J. P. Macura	February 14	Cleveland Cavaliers	
DeMarre Carroll	February 18	San Antonio Spurs	
Reggie Jackson	February 18	Detroit Pistons	
Markieff Morris	February 21	Detroit Pistons	
DeMarcus Cousins	February 23	Los Angeles Lakers	
Dusty Hannahs	February 27	Memphis Grizzlies	
Anthony Tolliver	February 29	Sacramento Kings	
Allen Crabbe	February 29	Minnesota Timberwolves	
Jordan McRae	March 1	Denver Nuggets	
Troy Daniels	March 1	Los Angeles Lakers	
Jordan Bell	March 2	Memphis Grizzlies	
Jared Harper^{†}	March 12	Phoenix Suns	
Isaiah Hartenstein	June 23	Houston Rockets	
Theo Pinson	June 23	Brooklyn Nets	
Kadeem Allen^{†}	June 25	New York Knicks	
Allonzo Trier	June 26	New York Knicks	
Michael Beasley	July 15	Brooklyn Nets	

- † Two-way contract

==== Training camp cuts ====
All players listed did not make the final roster.

Atlanta Hawks	Boston Celtics	Brooklyn Nets	Charlotte Hornets	Chicago Bulls
Armoni Brooks; Marcus Derrickson; Kenny Gabriel; Tahjere McCall; Mark Ogden Jr.; Jordan Sibert; Ray Spalding	Justin Bibbs; Kaiser Gates; Yante Maten; Dorian Pickens; Max Strus	Deng Adel; Devin Cannady; John Egbunu; C. J. Massinburg; Lance Thomas; C. J. Williams	Joe Chealey; Ahmed Hill; Josh Perkins; Thomas Welsh	Perrion Callandret; Milton Doyle; Simisola Shittu; Justin Simon
Cleveland Cavaliers	Dallas Mavericks	Denver Nuggets	Detroit Pistons	Golden State Warriors
Marques Bolden; Daniel Hamilton; Timothé Luwawu-Cabarrot; J. P. Macura; Jarell Martin; Sir'Dominic Pointer; Sindarius Thornwell	Yudai Baba; Chad Brown; Aric Holman; Dakota Mathias	Tyler Cook; Jorge Gutiérrez; Elijah Millsap; Tyler Zeller	Dakarai Allen; Donta Hall; Tra-Deon Hollins; Joe Johnson; Craig Sword; Tre'Shawn Thurman; Todd Withers	Jared Cunningham; Andrew Harrison; Devyn Marble; Alfonzo McKinnie; Kavion Pippen; Juan Toscano-Anderson
Houston Rockets	Indiana Pacers	Los Angeles Clippers	Los Angeles Lakers	Memphis Grizzlies
Anthony Bennett; Jaron Blossomgame; Michael Frazier II; Matur Maker; Shamorie Ponds; Ronshad Shabazz; Ray Spalding	Amida Brimah; JaKeenan Gant; Stephan Hicks; Walt Lemon Jr.; C. J. Wilcox	Donte Grantham; Terry Larrier; James Palmer Jr.; B. J. Taylor	Marcus Allen; Devontae Cacok; Jordan Caroline; Reggie Hearn; Demetrius Jackson; David Stockton	Bennie Boatwright; Shaq Buchanan; Ahmad Caver; Dusty Hannahs; Matt Mooney; Miles Plumlee; Ivan Rabb; Jarrod Uthoff
Miami Heat	Milwaukee Bucks	Minnesota Timberwolves	New Orleans Pelicans	New York Knicks
Kyle Alexander; Skylar Flatten; Jeremiah Martin; Mychal Mulder; Bubu Palo; Davon Reed	Jaylen Adams; Jemerrio Jones; Trevor Lacey; Luke Maye; Rayjon Tucker	Tyus Battle; Barry Brown Jr.; Jordan Murphy; Tyrone Wallace; Lindell Wigginton	Jalen Adams; Javon Bess; Kavell Bigby-Williams; Aubrey Dawkins	Amir Hinton; Zak Irvin; V. J. King; Lamar Peters; Kenny Wooten
Oklahoma City Thunder	Orlando Magic	Philadelphia 76ers	Phoenix Suns	Portland Trail Blazers
DeVaughn Akoon-Purcell; Sedrick Barefield; Vincent Edwards; Abdul Gaddy; Myke Henry; Kadeem Jack; Eric Moreland	Jon Davis; Hassani Gravett; Isaac Humphries; DaQuan Jeffries; B. J. Johnson; Vic Law	Shizz Alston; Jared Brownridge; Terry Harris; Haywood Highsmith; Christ Koumadje; Isaiah Miles; Xavier Munford; Julian Washburn	Aaron Epps; David Krämer; Norense Odiase; Tariq Owens; Troy Williams	Keljin Blevins; Troy Caupain; London Perrantes
Sacramento Kings	San Antonio Spurs	Toronto Raptors	Utah Jazz	Washington Wizards
Tyler Lydon; Eric Mika; Isaiah Piñeiro; Hollis Thompson; Tyler Ulis	Daulton Hommes; Dedric Lawson; Galen Robinson Jr.; Kenny Williams	Tyler Ennis; Sagaba Konate; Matt Morgan; Cameron Payne; Devin Robinson; Isaiah Taylor	Trevon Bluiett; Kyle Collinsworth; Isaac Haas; Anthony Lawrence II; Juwan Morgan; Mike Scott	Justin Anderson; Phil Booth; Dikembe Dixson; Jalen Jones; Jemerrio Jones; Anžejs Pasečņiks

== Draft ==
=== First round ===
Pick	Player	Date signed	Team	Ref
1	Zion Williamson	July 1	New Orleans Pelicans	
2	Ja Morant	July 1	Memphis Grizzlies	
3	RJ Barrett	July 2	New York Knicks	
4	De'Andre Hunter	July 7	Los Angeles Lakers (traded to Atlanta via New Orleans)	
5	Darius Garland	July 1	Cleveland Cavaliers	
6	Jarrett Culver	July 8	Phoenix Suns (traded to Minnesota)	
7	Coby White	July 1	Chicago Bulls	
8	Jaxson Hayes	July 7	Atlanta Hawks (traded to New Orleans)	
9	Rui Hachimura	July 1	Washington Wizards	
10	Cam Reddish	July 1	Atlanta Hawks	
11	Cameron Johnson	July 6	Minnesota Timberwolves (traded to Phoenix)	
12	P. J. Washington	July 3	Charlotte Hornets	
13	Tyler Herro	July 10	Miami Heat	
14	Romeo Langford	July 11	Boston Celtics	
15	Sekou Doumbouya	July 4	Detroit Pistons	
16	Chuma Okeke	—	Orlando Magic	
17	Nickeil Alexander-Walker	July 7	Brooklyn Nets (traded to New Orleans via Atlanta)	
18	Goga Bitadze	July 15	Indiana Pacers	
19	Luka Šamanić	July 1	San Antonio Spurs	
20	Matisse Thybulle	July 3	Boston Celtics (traded to Philadelphia)	
21	Brandon Clarke	July 7	Oklahoma City Thunder (traded to Memphis)	
22	Grant Williams	July 11	Boston Celtics	
23	Darius Bazley	July 7	Utah Jazz (traded to Oklahoma City via Memphis)	
24	Ty Jerome	July 6	Philadelphia 76ers (traded to Phoenix via Boston)	
25	Nassir Little	July 1	Portland Trail Blazers	
26	Dylan Windler	July 1	Cleveland Cavaliers	
27	Mfiondu Kabengele	July 9	Brooklyn Nets (traded to the L.A. Clippers)	
28	Jordan Poole	July 4	Golden State Warriors	
29	Keldon Johnson	July 1	San Antonio Spurs	
30	Kevin Porter Jr.	July 3	Milwaukee Bucks (traded to Cleveland via Detroit)	

=== Second round ===
Pick	Player	Date signed	Team	Ref
31	Nic Claxton	July 7	Brooklyn Nets	
32	KZ Okpala	July 7	Phoenix Suns (traded to Miami via Indiana)	
33	Carsen Edwards	July 12	Philadelphia 76ers (traded to Boston)	
34	Bruno Fernando	July 7	Philadelphia 76ers (traded to Atlanta)	
35	Didi Louzada	—	Atlanta Hawks (traded to New Orleans)	
36	Cody Martin	July 31	Charlotte Hornets	
37	Deividas Sirvydis	—	Dallas Mavericks (traded to Detroit)	
38	Daniel Gafford	July 8	Chicago Bulls	
39	Alen Smailagić	July 8	New Orleans Pelicans (traded to Golden State)	
40	Justin James	July 10	Sacramento Kings	
41	Eric Paschall	July 8	Atlanta Hawks (traded to Golden State)	
42	Admiral Schofield	July 13	Philadelphia 76ers (traded to Washington)	
43	Jaylen Nowell	August 5	Minnesota Timberwolves	
44	Bol Bol	September 4	Miami Heat (traded to Denver)	
45	Isaiah Roby	August 7	Detroit Pistons (traded to Dallas)	
46	Talen Horton-Tucker	July 13	Orlando Magic (traded to L.A. Lakers)	
47	Ignas Brazdeikis	July 6	Sacramento Kings (traded to New York)	
48	Terance Mann	July 9	Los Angeles Clippers	
49	Quinndary Weatherspoon	July 8	San Antonio Spurs	
50	Jarrell Brantley	July 16	Indiana Pacers (traded to Utah)	
51	Tremont Waters	July 25	Boston Celtics	
52	Jalen McDaniels	October 10	Charlotte Hornets	
53	Justin Wright-Foreman	July 16	Utah Jazz	
54	Marial Shayok	July 7	Philadelphia 76ers	
55	Kyle Guy	July 7	New York Knicks (traded to Sacramento)	
56	Jaylen Hands	—	Los Angeles Clippers (traded to Brooklyn)	
57	Jordan Bone	July 7	New Orleans Pelicans (traded to Detroit via Atlanta and Philadelphia)	
58	Miye Oni	July 15	Golden State Warriors (traded to Utah)	
59	Dewan Hernandez	July 12	Toronto Raptors	
60	Vanja Marinković	—	Sacramento Kings	

=== Previous years' draftees ===
Draft	Pick	Player	Date signed	Team	Previous team	Ref
2017	55	Nigel Williams-Goss	July 19	Utah Jazz	Olympiacos B.C. (Greece)	
2017	49	Vlatko Čančar	August 1	Denver Nuggets	San Pablo Burgos (Spain)	
2018	53	Devon Hall	September 4	Oklahoma City Thunder	Oklahoma City Blue (G League)	
2015	53	Sir'Dominic Pointer	October 4	Cleveland Cavaliers	Canton Charge (G League)	
2018	57	Kevin Hervey	December 12	Oklahoma City Thunder	Oklahoma City Blue (G League)	

=== Renounced draft rights ===
Draft	Pick	Player	Date of rights' renouncement	Former team	Ref
2017	25	Anžejs Pasečņiks	July 1	Philadelphia 76ers	
2013	45	Marko Todorović	July 31	Houston Rockets	
