= Omaha's Finest =

- League: The Basketball League
- Founded: 2020
- History: Omaha's Finest; 2021–present
- Location: Omaha, Nebraska
- Team colors
- Head coach: Eric Behrens
- Ownership: Tra-Deon Hollins
- Website: Official website

The Omaha's Finest is a professional basketball team in Omaha, Nebraska that is a member of The Basketball League (TBL).

== History ==
In May 2020, Tra-Deon Hollins announced the formation of the Omaha's Finest basketball team to compete in The Basketball Tournament 2020. It was composed of Justin Patton, Louisville grad Akoy Agau, and Tre'Shawn Thurman, among the players who were invited to participate. Previously, the city hosted the Omaha Racers. The franchise played in the Continental Basketball Association (CBA) from 1989 to 1997. However, on June 16, 2020, the tournament was scaled back due to the COVID-19 pandemic and the team was not included.

On January 27, 2021, Evelyn Magley, CEO of The Basketball League (TBL), announced that Omaha's Finest, owned by Tra-Deon Hollins, was joining the league for the 2021 season. On January 28, 2021, Eric Behrens was announced as the head coach. Ryan Stubbe was named the general manager, while Agau was the director of basketball operations. It was announced on March 15, 2021, that the team would play its home games at Millard North High School and the season opener was on April 9 against the Enid Outlaws.

The team's initial roster featured Thurman, SWAC player of the year Devonte Patterson, former Mississippi State player Craig Sword, as well as several local Omaha players. Omaha's Finest reached the playoffs in their first season before losing to Enid.
