= Devonte Patterson =

American basketball player (born 1996)

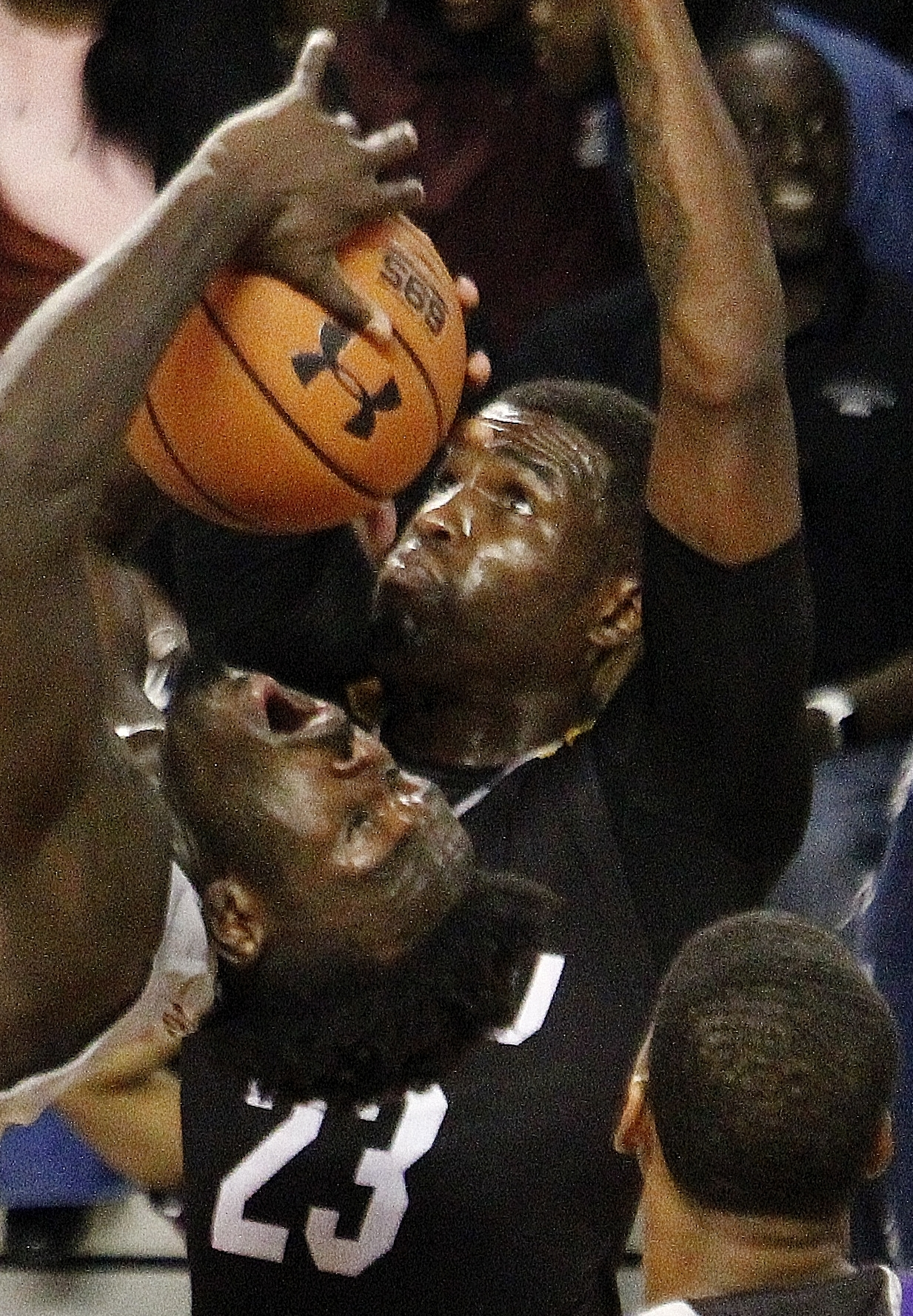
- Patterson with Prairie View A&M in 2020

Club Atlético Lanús
- Position: Small forward
- League: Liga Nacional de Básquetbol

Personal information
- Born: November 1, 1996 (age 30) Bridgeport, Texas, U.S.
- Listed height: 6 ft 7 in (2.01 m)
- Listed weight: 205 lb (93 kg)

Career information
- High school: Bridgeport (Bridgeport, Texas)
- College: Ranger (2016–2018); Prairie View A&M (2018–2020)
- NBA draft: 2020: undrafted
- Playing career: 2021–present

Career history
- 2021: Omaha's Finest
- 2021: Iowa Wolves
- 2021: Grand Rapids Gold
- 2021: Wisconsin Herd
- 2021–2022: Lakeland Magic
- 2022–2023: Rayos de Hermosillo
- 2023–present: Club Atlético Lanús

Career highlights
- SWAC Player of the Year (2020); 2x First-team All-SWAC (2019, 2020)
- Stats at Basketball Reference

Devonte Dawayne Patterson (born November 1, 1996) is an American professional basketball player who last played for the Lakeland Magic of the NBA G League. He played college basketball at Ranger College and Prairie View A&M.

== Early life ==
Patterson was homeschooled before 2014, when he moved in with Neal Hawks, the brother-in-law of Mark Cuban. Patterson enrolled at Bridgeport and helped led the team to the 2015 UIL Class 4A state basketball championship.

== College career ==
Patterson began his collegiate career at Ranger College before transferring to Prairie View A&M. As a junior, Patterson averaged 13.5 points and 5.0 rebounds per game. He was named to the First Team All-SWAC. He declared for the 2019 NBA draft but withdrew to return to school. Patterson was suspended for the first eight games of his senior season due to an error in draft paperwork. On March 5, 2020, he scored a career-high 33 points and had 10 rebounds in an 80–71 loss to Alcorn State. As a senior, Patterson finished third in the league in points per game (15.8), and ranked fourth in rebounds per game (6.4) while shooting 46.3 percent on a team that clinched back-to-back regular season titles. He was named SWAC Player of the Year.

== Professional career ==
=== Omaha's Finest (2021) ===
After going undrafted in the 2020 NBA draft, Patterson signed an Exhibit 10 contract with the Dallas Mavericks. He did not make the final roster. In 2021, Patterson joined Omaha's Finest of The Basketball League for its debut season.

=== Iowa Wolves (2021) ===
On October 23, 2021, Patterson was selected with the 17th pick of the second round of the 2021 NBA G League draft by the Lakeland Magic, subsequently traded to the Iowa Wolves, where he played in three games, before being waived on December 6.

=== Grand Rapids Gold (2021) ===
On December 8, 2021, Patterson signed with the Grand Rapids Gold, appearing in four games. On December 15, he was waived, but was re-signed four days later.

=== Wisconsin Herd (2021) ===
Patterson played one game for the Wisconsin Herd on December 24.

=== Lakeland Magic (2021–2022) ===
On December 30, 2021, following the Orlando Magic calling up several players from the Lakeland Magic due to injuries and infections in the NBA team, Patterson was acquired by Lakeland. He appeared in seven games, but was waived on January 24, 2022. Patterson was re-acquired by the Lakeland Magic on January 28, but was waived again on January 31.

=== Rayos de Hermosillo (2022) ===
Patterson joined Mexican team Rayos de Hermosillo in early 2022.
