= Tra-Deon Hollins =

American basketball player (born 1995)

Personal information
- Born: August 22, 1995 (age 31) Omaha, Nebraska, U.S.
- Listed height: 6 ft 2 in (1.88 m)
- Listed weight: 195 lb (88 kg)

Career information
- High school: Omaha Central (Omaha, Nebraska)
- College: Central CC (2013–2014); Chipola JC (2014–2015); Omaha (2015–2017)
- NBA draft: 2017: undrafted
- Playing career: 2017–2024
- Position: Point guard

Career history
- 2017–2019: Fort Wayne Mad Ants
- 2019: St. John's Edge
- 2019–2020: Grand Rapids Drive
- 2021: Westchester Knicks
- 2021–2022: Delaware Blue Coats
- 2022: Salt Lake City Stars
- 2022–2023: Texas Legends
- 2023: Raptors 905
- 2023: Iowa Wolves
- 2024: Ostioneros de Guaymas

Career highlights
- NBA G League All-Defensive Team (2020); NCAA steals leader (2016); 2× Summit League Defensive Player of the Year (2016, 2017); 2× First-team All-Summit League (2016, 2017)
- Stats at Basketball Reference

Tra-Deon Hollins (born August 22, 1995) is an American former professional basketball player. Born in Omaha, he played for Omaha Central High School of his hometown. He started playing college basketball for Central CC-Columbus, before transferring to Chipola JC in 2014. In 2015, he moved to Division I college Omaha where he was named in the first team of the Summit League and earned the league's Defensive Player of the Year award in 2016 and 2017. Hollins was the NCAA steals leader in 2016.

== High school career ==
Hollins played basketball for Omaha Central High School of his hometown. He won a spot in the varsity team as a freshman as a defensive specialist, routinely defending the opponents' best player. Hollins came up to win four consecutive Class A state championships from 2010 to 2013, playing along future Omaha Mavericks teammate Tre'Shawn Thurman. As a senior, he averaged 12.0 points and 5.8 rebounds per game, earning All-Nebraska first team honors.

== College career ==
As he failed academically to play for a Division I school, Hollins enrolled to Central CC-Columbus of the NJCAA Division II. He appeared in 36 games for the school, averaging 17.1 points, 6.2 rebounds and 5.3 assists per game, while his 4.1 steals per game ranked first nationally in Division II. After one season at Central CC-Columbus, Hollins transferred to Chipola College in Marianna, Florida. He appeared in 9 games, averaging 13.6 points, 4.1 rebounds, 6.6 assists, and 4.6 steals per game, before on December 4, 2014, he was attacked with a gun while driving a friend's car. Although Hollins stated that he was "in the wrong place at the wrong time", on 6 December 2014, he was dismissed from both the basketball team and the college allegedly due to disciplinary reasons.

After leaving Chipola, Hollins committed to Omaha. He stated that playing for the Mavericks was "a dream come true" and acknowledged the coaching staff's belief in him as the reason for committing to the college. Against South Dakota State, Hollins posted 28 points and 9 rebounds, both career-highs. For his performances in the 2015–16 season Hollins was named in the first team All-Summit and also received Defensive Player of the Year accolades in the Summit League. As a senior he was named in the preseason all-Summit first team. On 18 January 2017, in a game versus Denver, Hollins set the all-time steals record for Omaha with 192, finishing his career with a total of 234 steals in 64 games. For his performances during the season, he was named for a second consecutive season first-team all-Summit League and Defensive Player of the Year.

== Professional career ==
=== Fort Wayne Mad Ants (2017–2019) ===
After going undrafted in the 2017 NBA draft, Hollins signed his first professional contract in early July 2017 with Polish team AZS Koszalin, but his contract was terminated in September, just before the start of the season. In October 2017, the Fort Wayne Mad Ants selected Hollins in the 2017 NBA G League draft with the 21st pick. After making the Mad Ants' final roster for the season, he made his professional debut against in a 99–115 loss to the Long Island Nets posting numbers of 10 points, 4 rebounds, 2 steals and 1 assist.

=== Grand Rapids Drive (2019–2020) ===
For the 2019–20 season, Hollins signed with the Grand Rapids Drive of the G League. Hollins averaged 6.9 points, 7.9 assists, 3.6 rebounds, and 2.6 steals per game, shooting 36% from the field.

=== Westchester Knicks (2021) ===
In 2021, Hollins signed with the Westchester Knicks. He also became the owner of Omaha's Finest, a new basketball team in The Basketball League that began play in 2021.

=== Delaware Blue Coats (2021–2022) ===
On October 12, 2021, Hollins was acquired by the Delaware Blue Coats in a trade, in exchange for the returning player rights to Julian Washburn. On December 7, he was waived, after averaging 4.4 points, 2.2 rebounds and 1.4 assists per game in five games.

On December 11, 2021, Hollins signed with the Windy City Bulls. However, he was later waived by the Bulls returning to Delaware on December 17.

=== Salt Lake City Stars (2022) ===
On January 3, 2022, Hollins cleared waivers, and was acquired and activated by the Salt Lake City Stars of the NBA G League. Hollins was then later waived on February 25, 2022.

=== Texas Legends (2022–2023) ===
On November 3, 2022, Hollins was named to the opening night roster for the Texas Legends. On January 6, 2023, Hollins was waived.

=== Raptors 905 (2023) ===
On January 27, 2023, Hollins was acquired by the Raptors 905.

=== Iowa Wolves (2023) ===
On December 2, 2023, Hollins signed with the Iowa Wolves, but was waived three days later.

=== Ostioneros de Guaymas (2024) ===
Hollins signed with the Ostioneros de Guaymas of the Circuito de Baloncesto de la Costa del Pacífico (CIBACOPA) ahead of the 2024 CIBACOPA season. However, he was waived on April 9.

== See also ==
- List of NCAA Division I men's basketball season steals leaders
