= Central Community College =

Public community college in Central Nebraska

Coordinates: 40.5775°N 98.3317°W

- Type: Community college
- Established: 1973
- Location: Grand Island, Nebraska, U.S.
- Campus: Rural
- Nickname: CCC Raiders
- Mascot: Raider Rex
- Website: cccneb.edu
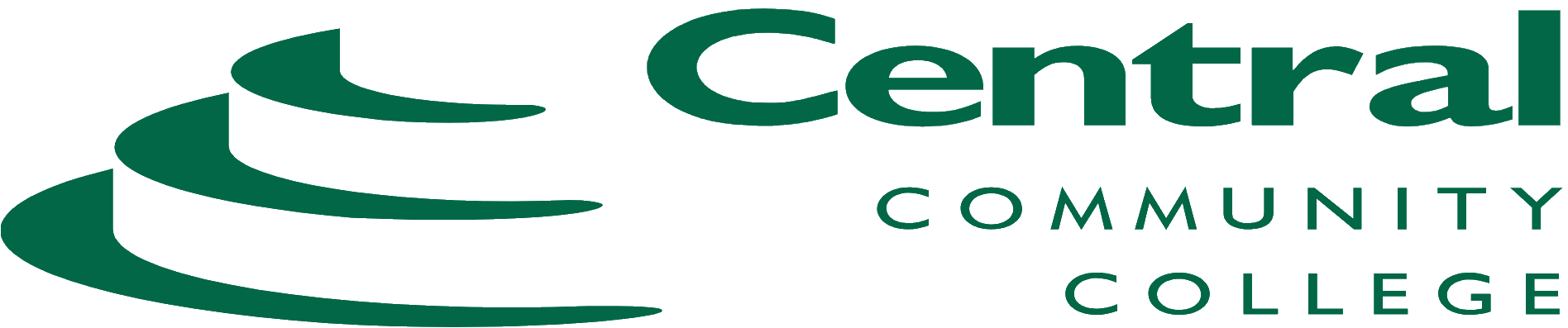

Central Community College is a public community college in central Nebraska, United States. The college has three campuses, in Columbus, Grand Island, and Hastings. In addition, the college has learning centers in Holdrege, Kearney, and Lexington. The college's athletic nickname is the CCC Raiders. As of 2025, the college enrolls 3,200 students. The college was created by the Nebraska State Legislature in 1973.

== History ==
Central Community College was announced by the Nebraska State Legislature after passing a bill creating eight technical community colleges located across the state. As part of the bill, the original junior colleges were consolidated into the new community college, known as Central Nebraska Technical Community College. The college officially began operations on July 1, 1973, with administrative offices in Grand Island, and two campuses in Hastings and Columbus.

During attempts to make a full campus for Grand Island, some citizens of Hastings filed a lawsuit to prevent its construction. The plaintiffs claimed that building a new campus in Grand Island would draw students away from Hastings. A restraining order was filed to prevent construction; however, it was later dissolved in January 1974. The Grand Island campus later opened in 1975. The college opened a learning center in Lexington in 1977.

In 1981, the college removed "Technical" from its name, becoming just Central Community College. However, the name was not legally changed until 1991, when the Legislature passed a law requiring it. In 1995, the college opened a learning center in Holdrege. In 2000, the college re-branded to its current logo, which represents three C's in a staircase-like shape.

== Academics ==
Undergraduate demographics as of 2025
Race and ethnicity	Total
White	62%
Hispanic	32%
Asian	1%
Native American	1%
Black	4%
Economic diversity
Low-income (Note: The percentage of students who received an income-based federal Pell grant intended for low-income students.)	39%
Affluent (Note: The percentage of students who are a part of the American middle class at the bare minimum.)	61%

Central Community College is a public community college. As of 2025, the college has 3,200 students enrolled. The college has 59 fields of study. Major fields of study include Business Administration, Vehicle Maintenance and Repair Technologies, Precision Metal Working, Liberal Arts and Sciences, and Criminal Justice and Corrections.

== Campuses ==
Central Community Colleges is located in Central Nebraska. The college has three campuses. Campuses include Grand Island, Columbus, and Hastings. The college also has learning centers in Holdrege, Kearney, and Lexington.

== Sources ==
- Kinley, Oriel V (1986). Central Community College: The First Two Decades. OCLC 13521057.
