= Tre'Shawn Thurman =

American basketball player (born 1995)

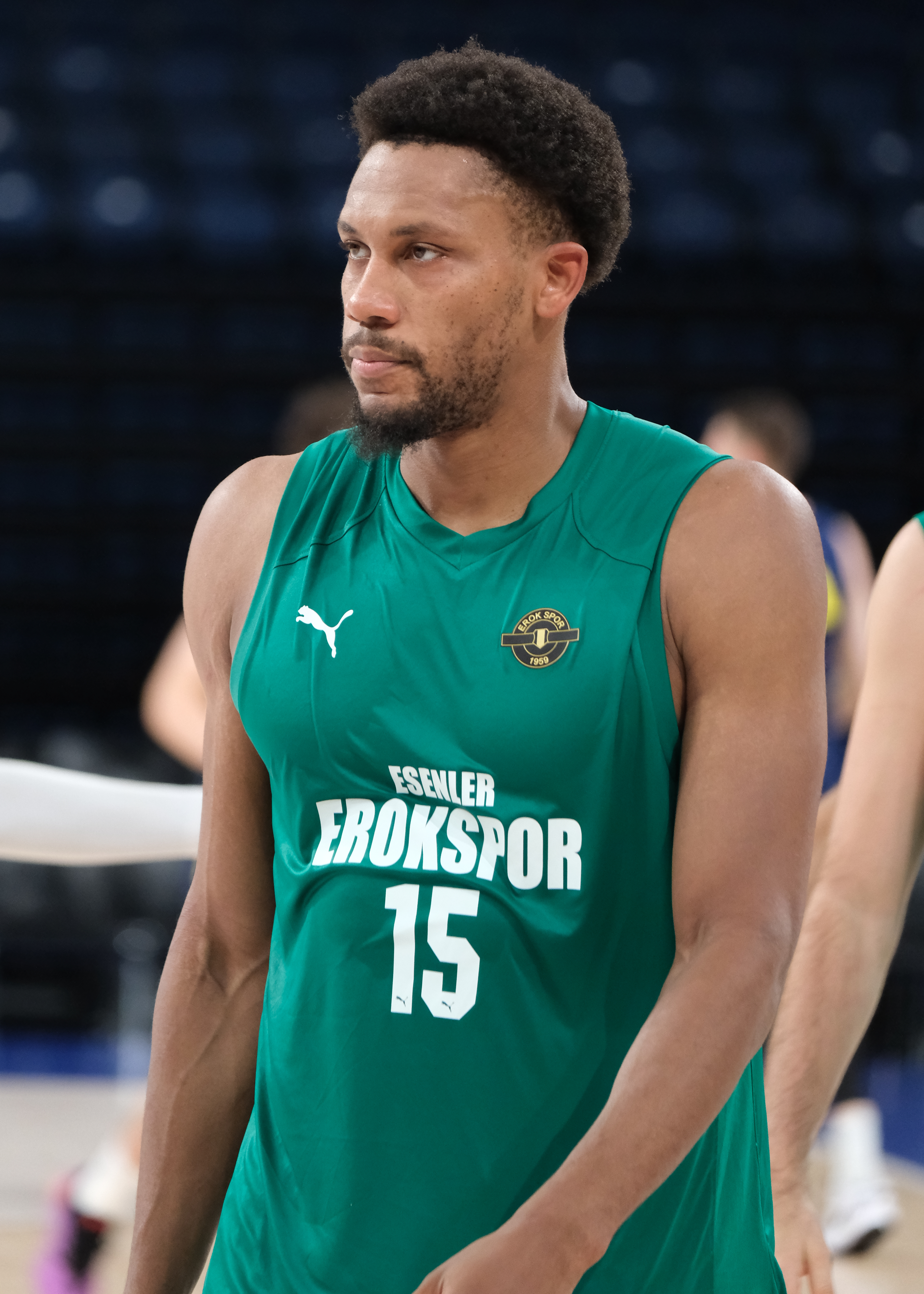
- Thurman with Esenler Erokspor in 2025

No. 15 – Tofaş
- Position: Small forward / power forward
- League: BSL; EuroCup

Personal information
- Born: December 15, 1995 (age 30) Omaha, Nebraska, U.S.
- Listed height: 6 ft 7 in (2.01 m)
- Listed weight: 225 lb (102 kg)

Career information
- High school: Omaha Central (Omaha, Nebraska)
- College: Omaha (2014–2017); Nevada (2018–2019)
- NBA draft: 2019: undrafted
- Playing career: 2019–present

Career history
- 2019–2020: Grand Rapids Drive
- 2021: Omaha's Finest
- 2021–2022: Stockton Kings
- 2022–2023: Oostende
- 2023–2025: Wolves Twinsbet
- 2025–2026: Esenler Erokspor
- 2026–present: Tofaş
- Stats at Basketball Reference

Tre'Shawn Thurman (born December 15, 1995) is an American professional basketball player for Tofaş of the Basketbol Süper Ligi (BSL) and the EuroCup. He played college basketball for the Nevada Wolf Pack and the Omaha Mavericks.

== Early life ==
Thurman was born in San Diego, California but grew up in Omaha, Nebraska. He attended Omaha Central High School, which was nationally ranked. He led the team to a state title and earned all-state honors as a senior, averaging 16.6 points and 7.9 rebounds per game.

== College career ==
As a freshman at Omaha, Thurman averaged 9.5 points and 5.6 rebounds per game. Thurman averaged 13.9 points and 6.7 rebounds per game as a sophomore. He posted 13.8 points and 7.8 rebounds per game as a junior and was named to the Summit League Honorable Mention Team. Omaha finished 18–14 in his junior season, and Thurman had 21 points and eight rebounds in the Summit League Tournament final, where the Mavericks lost to South Dakota State, 79–77. After the season, Thurman decided to transfer for his final season of eligibility, considering offers from Drake and Wright State before settling on Nevada. As a senior at Nevada, Thurman averaged 8.2 points, 5.8 rebounds, 1.7 assists and 1.1 steals per game. He made 29 starts and shot 49.8 percent from the floor and 26.4 percent from behind the arc.

== Professional career ==
After going undrafted in the 2019 NBA draft, Thurman participated in the G League Player Invitational. On October 18, 2019, Thurman signed with the Detroit Pistons. He was named to the roster of the Pistons’ NBA G League affiliate, the Grand Rapids Drive. Thurman averaged 7.6 points, 3.4 rebounds and 1.2 assists per game. In 2021, Thurman joined Omaha's Finest of The Basketball League. He sustained an injury in April, ending his season. Thurman joined the Stockton Kings in October 2021.

On August 10, 2022, Thurman signed in Belgium with Filou Oostende of the BNXT League.

On July 30, 2023, Thurman signed a two-year (1+1) deal with BC Wolves of the Lithuanian Basketball League (LKL).

On July 27, 2025, he signed with Esenler Erokspor of the Basketbol Süper Ligi (BSL).

On July 22, 2026, he signed with Tofaş of the Basketbol Süper Ligi (BSL).

== Career statistics ==
Legend
| GP | Games played | GS | Games started | MPG | Minutes per game |
| FG% | Field-goal percentage | 3P% | 3-point field-goal percentage | FT% | Free-throw percentage |
| RPG | Rebounds per game | APG | Assists per game | SPG | Steals per game |
| BPG | Blocks per game | PPG | Points per game | PIR | Performance index rating |
| **Bold** | Career high |

=== EuroCup ===
| Year | Team | GP | GS | MPG | FG% | 3P% | FT% | RPG | APG | SPG | BPG | PPG | PIR |
|---|---|---|---|---|---|---|---|---|---|---|---|---|---|
| 2023–24 | Wolves Vilnius | **18** | **12** | **26.5** | **.460** | **.337** | **.815** | **4.6** | **1.7** | **.9** | **.4** | **14.3** | **13.4** |
| Career | | 18 | 12 | 26.5 | .460 | .337 | .815 | 4.6 | 1.7 | .9 | .4 | 14.3 | 13.4 |
