= 2025 TBL season =

Basketball league season

- League: TBL
- Sport: Basketball

TBL seasons
- ← 2024 2026 →

The 2025 TBL season is the eighth season of The Basketball League (TBL).

== League changes ==
League President David Magley also announced that TBL would be planning to further expand into The Maritimes for the 2025 season. It was announced that the Halifax Hoopers and Tri City Tide would represent the region for the 2025 season. Due to scheduling changes teams in the Mid Atlantic and North Atlantic Conferences would play one another.

On August 28, 2024, the Glass City Wranglers announced they would depart for the Basketball Super League for the 2024–2025 season. In October 2024, the Connecticut Crusaders announced they were relocating from Bridgeport, Connecticut to New Haven, Connecticut. The Tri-State Admirals announced that they would play a hybrid schedule competing against teams in the Basketball Super League.

== Standings ==
=== North Atlantic ===
Pos	Team	Pld	W	L	PCT	GB
1	(New York (state)) New York Phoenix	21	18	3	.857	—
2	(New York (state)) Albany Patroons	22	18	4	.818	0.5
3	(Nova Scotia) Halifax Hoopers	17	14	3	.824	2
4	(New Brunswick) Tri City Tide	20	5	15	.250	12.5
5	(New Jersey) Tri State Admirals	16	1	15	.063	14.5

Updated to match(es) played on 7 May 2025. Source:

=== Mid Atlantic ===
Pos	Team	Pld	W	L	PCT	GB
1	(Maryland) Frederick Flying Cows	18	17	1	.944	—
2	(Maryland) Capital Sea Hawks	17	12	5	.706	4.5
3	Virginia Valley Vipers	17	11	6	.647	5.5
4	(New Jersey) Jersey Shore Breaks	18	4	14	.222	13
5	(Pennsylvania) Reading Rebels	17	2	15	.118	14.5
6	Connecticut Crusaders	13	1	12	.077	13.5
7	(New York (state)) Rochester Kingz	4	0	4	.000	10

Updated to match(es) played on 2 May 2025. Source:

=== South Atlantic ===
Pos	Team	Pld	W	L	PCT	GB
1	(Florida) Tampa Bay Titans	12	10	2	.833	—
2	(North Carolina) Raleigh Firebirds	16	13	3	.813	+1
3	(Georgia (U.S. state)) Savannah Buccaneers	11	3	8	.273	6.5
4	(Florida) Jacksonville 95ers	14	2	12	.143	9

Updated to match(es) played on 7 May 2025. Source:

=== Central ===
Pos	Team	Pld	W	L	PCT	GB
1	(Oklahoma) Potawatomi Fire	15	14	1	.933	—
2	(Oklahoma) Enid Outlaws	17	10	7	.588	5
3	(Arkansas) Little Rock Lightning	14	6	8	.429	7.5
4	(Texas) San Antonio Clutch	14	0	14	.000	13.5

Updated to match(es) played on 7 May 2025. Source:

=== Midwest ===
Pos	Team	Pld	W	L	PCT	GB
1	(Indiana) Kokomo BobKats	16	12	4	.750	—
2	(Missouri) St. Louis Griffins	12	9	3	.750	1
3	(Indiana) Logansport Iron Horses	18	10	8	.556	3
4	(Indiana) Lebanon Leprechauns	17	8	9	.471	4.5
5	(Illinois) Lake County Legacy	12	0	12	.000	10

Updated to match(es) played on 7 May 2025. Source:

=== Pacific Northwest ===
Pos	Team	Pld	W	L	PCT	GB
1	(Montana) Great Falls Electric	17	16	1	.941	—
2	(Washington (state)) Wenatchee Bighorns	17	12	5	.706	4
3	(Washington (state)) Seattle Super Hawks	16	9	7	.563	6.5
4	(Oregon) Salem Capitals	16	7	9	.438	8.5
5	(Washington (state)) Vancouver Volcanoes	14	3	11	.214	11.5
6	(Oregon) Willamette Valley Jaguars	15	1	14	.067	14

Updated to match(es) played on 7 May 2025. Source:

=== Pacific Southwest ===
Pos	Team	Pld	W	L	PCT	GB
1	(California) San Diego Sharks	14	11	3	.786	—
2	(California) Long Beach Blue Waves	12	5	7	.417	5
3	(California) Bakersfield Majestics	12	5	7	.417	5

Updated to match(es) played on 7 May 2025. Source:

== Tournament bracket ==
=== Play Off Play Ins ===
May 27 – Upper Midwest
Kokomo Bobkats	115
Logansport Iron Horses	124

May 24 – South Atlantic
Jacksonville 95ers	96
Tampa Bay Titans	102

May 27 – Pacific Northwest
Seattle Super Hawks	128
Wenatchee Bighorns	107

May 27 – North Atlantic
Albany Patroons	122
Halifax Hoopers	106

== Playoffs ==
Round of 16
Great Falls Electric	2
Seattle Super Hawks	0
West
San Diego Sharks	2
Bakersfield Majestics	1
St. Louis Griffins	1
Logansport Iron Horses	2
Central
Potowatomi Fire	2
Enid Outlaws	0
New York Phoenix	1
Albany Patroons	2
East
Capital Seahawks	2
Virginia Valley Vipers	0
Frederick Flying Cows	2
Reading Rebels	0
Midwest
Raleigh Firebirds	2
Tampa Bay Titans	1

Quarter-finals
Great Falls Electric	2
San Diego Sharks	0
Logansport Iron Horses	0
Potawatomi Fire	2
Albany Patroons	0
Capital Seahawks	2
Frederick Flying Cows	2
Raleigh Firebirds	1

Semi-finals
Great Falls Electric	0
Potawatomi Fire	2
Capital Seahawks	2
Frederick Flying Cows	0

Final
Potawatomi Fire	2
Capital Seahawks	0
