= 2021–22 London Lions season =

London Lions (basketball)

- Head coach: (United Kingdom) Nikhil Lawry
- Captain: (United Kingdom) Justin Robinson
- Arena: Copper Box Arena

BBL results
- Record: 16–11 (.593)
- Ladder: 3rd
- BBL Cup: Semifinalist (lost to Riders 178–170 on aggregate)
- BBL Trophy: Runners-up (lost to Phoenix 68–82)
- Playoff finish: Runners-up (lost to Riders 78–75)
- Stats at BBL.org.uk

Player records
- Points: (United States) Reese 19.3
- Rebounds: (United States) Kelley 7.4
- Assists: (United States) Reese 6.5
- All statistics correct as of 1 May 2022.

The 2021–22 BBL season was the 45th season for the London Lions in the BBL, and 10th under the banner of London Lions.

The Lions play their home games at the 6,000 seat Copper Box Arena in Queen Elizabeth Olympic Park, London.

== Roster ==
Note: Flags indicate national team eligibility at FIBA-sanctioned events. Players may hold other non-FIBA nationalities not displayed.

2021–22 London Lions roster
Players
Coaches

Pos.	No.	Nat.	Name	Ht.	Wt.
F	1	(Jamaica)	Martin, Ryan	2.06 m (6 ft 9 in)	102 kg (225 lb)
G	3	(Barbados)	Lockhart, Andre	1.83 m (6 ft 0 in)	86 kg (190 lb)
F	4	(United States)	Washburn, Julian (I)	2.03 m (6 ft 8 in)	95 kg (209 lb)
F/C	5	(United States)	Kelley, Kylor (I)	2.13 m (7 ft 0 in)	98 kg (216 lb)
F	6	(United Kingdom)	Williams, Jordan	2.03 m (6 ft 8 in)	109 kg (240 lb)
G/F	9	(Italy)	Cugini, Lorenzo	2.01 m (6 ft 7 in)	102 kg (225 lb)
G	10	(United Kingdom)	Robinson, Justin (C)	1.88 m (6 ft 2 in)	86 kg (190 lb)
G	11	(United States)	Williams, Dirk (I)	1.96 m (6 ft 5 in)	82 kg (181 lb)
G/F	13	(United States)	Reese, Isaiah (I)	1.96 m (6 ft 5 in)	84 kg (185 lb)
F/C	15	(United Kingdom)	Neighbour, Will	2.08 m (6 ft 10 in)	102 kg (225 lb)
G/F	21	(United Kingdom)	Ward-Hibbert, Joshua	1.96 m (6 ft 5 in)	86 kg (190 lb)
C	25	(United Kingdom)	Tawiah, Chris	2.08 m (6 ft 10 in)	107 kg (236 lb)
G	31	(United Kingdom)	Kaboza, Bradley (DP)	1.88 m (6 ft 2 in)	79 kg (174 lb)

Head coach

- (United Kingdom) Nikhil Lawry

Assistant coach(es)

- (United Kingdom) Dave Greenaway
- (United Kingdom) Robert Youngblood

Legend

- (C) Team captain
- (DP) Development player
- (IN) Inactive
- (I) Import player
- Injured

- Roster
Updated: 1 April 2022

=== Depth chart ===
Pos.	Starting 5	Bench 1	Bench 2
C	Kylor Kelley	Jordan Williams	Chris Tawiah
PF	Julian Washburn	Ryan Martin	Will Neighbour
SF	Lorenzo Cugini	Joshua Ward-Hibbert
SG	Dirk Williams	Bradley Kaboza	Andre Lockhart
PG	Isaiah Reese	Justin Robinson

== Pre-season ==
2021 pre-season game log
Total: 2–3 (home: 0–0; road: 2–3)
August: 1–1 (home: 0–0; road: 1–1)

Game	Date	Team	Score	High points	High rebounds	High assists	Location Attendance	Record
1	29 August	@ AEK	L 102–81	not available	not available	not available	Ano Liosia Olympic Hall closed event	0–1
2	31 August	@ Α.Ο. Τρίτων	W 47–69	not available	not available	not available	Ano Liosia Olympic Hall closed event	1–1

September: 1–2 (home: 0–0; road: 1–2)

Game	Date	Team	Score	High points	High rebounds	High assists	Location Attendance	Record
3	6 September	@ Mega Basket	L 82–58	Dirk Williams (14)	not available	not available	Mega Factory Hall closed event	1–2
4	8 September	@ OKK Beograd	W 78–97	not available	not available	not available	Mega Factory Hall closed event	2–2
5	9 September	@ CSM Oradea	L 102–90 (OT)	not available	not available	not available	Mega Factory Hall closed event	2–3

== Basketball Champions League ==
2021–22 game log
Total: 0–1 (home: 0–0; road: 0–1)
September: 0–1 (home: 0–0; road: 0–1)

Game	Date	Team	Score	High points	High rebounds	High assists	Location Attendance	Record
1	13 September	@ Universo Treviso Basket	L 62–89	Lorenzo Cugini (19)	Chris Tawiah (10)	Isaiah Reese (4)	Palaverde; 903	0–1

== FIBA Europe Cup ==
=== Regular season ===
==== Group A ====
Pos	Team	Pld	W	L	PF	PA	PD	Pts	Qualification
1	(Germany) Medi Bayreuth	6	5	1	516	443	+73	11	Advance to second round
2	(United Kingdom) London Lions	6	5	1	501	444	+57	11	Advance to second round
3	(Netherlands) Donar	6	2	4	426	463	−37	8	
4	(Austria) Kapfenberg Bulls	6	0	6	432	525	−93	6	

Source: Groups Standings

2021–22 game log
Total: 5–1 (home: 3–0; road: 2–1)
October: 3–0 (home: 2–0; road: 1–0)

Game	Date	Team	Score	High points	High rebounds	High assists	Location	Record
1	13 October	@ Donar Groningen	W 60–79	Marquis Teague (22)	Julian Washburn (11)	Isaiah Reese (8)	MartiniPlaza	1–0
2	20 October	Kapfenberg Bulls	W 68–58	Isaiah Reese (18)	Julian Washburn (11)	Isaiah Reese (6)	Copper Box Arena	2–0
3	27 October	Medi Bayreuth	W 91–81	Reese, D.Williams (19)	Kylor Kelley (7)	Julian Washburn (11)	Copper Box Arena	3–0

November: 2–1 (home: 1–0; road: 1–1)

Game	Date	Team	Score	High points	High rebounds	High assists	Location	Record
4	3 November	Donar Groningen	W 85–67	Marquis Teague (17)	Kelley, J.Williams (8)	Marquis Teague (6)	Copper Box Arena	4–0
5	10 November	@ Kapfenberg Bulls	W 81–100	Marquis Teague (21)	Julian Washburn (8)	Isaiah Reese (8)	Raiffeisen Sportpark	5–0
6	17 November	@ Medi Bayreuth	L 97–78	Dirk Williams (30)	Reese, Washburn (6)	Isaiah Reese (8)	Oberfrankenhalle	5–1

=== Second round ===
==== Group L ====
Pos	Team	Pld	W	L	PF	PA	PD	Pts	Qualification
1	(Russia) Avtodor (Note: On 2 March 2022, FIBA Europe announced it was banning all Russian teams from its competition as a response to the Russian invasion of Ukraine.)	6	5	1	556	499	+57	11	Excluded
2	(Turkey) Bahçeşehir Koleji	6	5	1	526	474	+52	11	Advance to Quarter Finals
3	(Denmark) Bakken Bears	6	1	5	505	536	−31	7	Advance to Quarter Finals
4	(United Kingdom) London Lions	6	1	5	463	541	−78	7	

Source: Second Round Standings
Notes:

2021–22 game log
Total: 1–5 (home: 1–2; road: 0–3)
December: 0–1 (home: 0–0; road: 0–1)

Game	Date	Team	Score	High points	High rebounds	High assists	Location	Record
1	8 December	@ Bahçeşehir Koleji	L 107–82	Marquis Teague (19)	Kylor Kelley (8)	Isaiah Reese (6)	Ülker Sports Arena	0–1

January: 0–3 (home: 0–1; road: 0–2)

Game	Date	Team	Score	High points	High rebounds	High assists	Location	Record
2	8 January	@ Avtodor	L 84–81	Kylor Kelley (22)	Kylor Kelley (13)	Marquis Teague (12)	Sports Palace Kristall	0–2
3	12 January	@ Bakken Bears	L 95–80	Majauskas, Reese (18)	Julian Washburn (9)	Isaiah Reese (8)	Vejlby-Risskov Hallen	0–3
4	26 January	Bahçeşehir Koleji	L 61–76	Isaiah Reese (19)	Kylor Kelley (11)	Isaiah Reese (6)	Copper Box Arena	0–4

February: 1–1 (home: 1–1; road: 0–0)

Game	Date	Team	Score	High points	High rebounds	High assists	Location	Record
5	1 February	Avtodor	L 77–104	Marquis Teague (28)	Kylor Kelley (6)	Isaiah Reese (9)	Copper Box Arena	0–5
6	9 February	Bakken Bears	W 82–75	Dirk Williams (23)	Isaiah Reese (10)	Isaiah Reese (11)	Copper Box Arena	1–5

== BBL Cup ==
=== South Group ===
Pos	Team	Pld	W	L	PF	PA	PD	Pts	Qualification
1	London Lions	8	7	1	722	622	+100	14	Quarter Finals
2	Leicester Riders	8	6	2	715	616	+99	12	Quarter Finals
3	Bristol Flyers	8	4	4	649	653	−4	8	Quarter Finals
4	Surrey Scorchers	8	3	5	639	654	−15	6	Quarter Finals
5	Plymouth City Patriots	8	0	8	513	693	−180	0	

Updated to match(es) played on 7 November 2021. Source: BBC Sport

=== Cup ===
2021–22 game log
Total: 8–3 (home: 4–1; road: 4–2)
September: 2–0 (home: 1–0; road: 1–0)

Game	Date	Team	Score	High points	High rebounds	High assists	Location Attendance	Record
1	24 September	@ Surrey Scorchers	W 85–86	Jase Harrison (24)	Harrison, Kaboza (7)	Jase Harrison (10)	Surrey Sports Park; 250	1–0
2	26 September	Plymouth City Patriots	W 90–61	Dirk Williams (19)	Julian Washburn (11)	Isaiah Reese (11)	Copper Box Arena; 700	2–0

October: 4–1 (home: 2–0; road: 2–1)

Game	Date	Team	Score	High points	High rebounds	High assists	Location Attendance	Record
3	2 October	@ Bristol Flyers	W 80–90	Dirk Williams (21)	Kelley, J.Williams (6)	Isaiah Reese (10)	SGS College Arena not available	3–0
4	8 October	Surrey Scorchers	W 88–73	Dirk Williams (20)	D.Williams, J.Williams (7)	Isaiah Reese (14)	Copper Box Arena not available	4–0
5	10 October	Bristol Flyers	W 94–85	Dirk Williams (28)	Julian Washburn (11)	Isaiah Reese (11)	Copper Box Arena; 400	5–0
6	17 October	@ Plymouth City Patriots	W 62–101	Lorenzo Cugini (35)	Jordan Williams (9)	Jordan Spencer (7)	Plymouth Pavilions not available	6–0
7	22 October	@ Leicester Riders	L 93–76	Dirk Williams (30)	Isaiah Reese (8)	Reese, D.Williams (4)	Morningside Arena not available	6–1

November: 2–0 (home: 1–0; road: 1–0)

Game	Date	Team	Score	High points	High rebounds	High assists	Location Attendance	Record
8	7 November	@ Leicester Riders	W 83–97	Lorenzo Cugini (20)	Jordan Williams (10)	Isaiah Reese (8)	Morningside Arena; 666	7–1
9	13 November	Sheffield Sharks	W 100–68	Lorenzo Cugini (28)	Jordan Williams (12)	Robinson, J.Williams (8)	Copper Box Arena; 500	8–1

December: 0–2 (home: 0–1; road: 0–1)

Game	Date	Team	Score	High points	High rebounds	High assists	Location Attendance	Record
10	10 December	Leicester Riders	L 96–99	Dirk Williams (24)	Kylor Kelley (13)	Isaiah Reese (5)	Copper Box Arena not available	8–2
11	30 December	@ Leicester Riders	L 79–74	Isaiah Reese (20)	Lorenzo Cugini (7)	Isaiah Reese (7)	Morningside Arena; 666	8–3

== BBL Championship ==
=== Standings ===
Pos	Team	Pld	W	L	PF	PA	PD	Pts	Qualification
1	Leicester Riders (C)	27	25	2	2458	1934	+524	50	Playoffs
2	Sheffield Sharks	27	17	10	2054	2005	+49	34	Playoffs
3	London Lions	27	16	11	2276	2165	+111	32	Playoffs
4	Bristol Flyers	27	14	13	2185	2097	+88	28	Playoffs
5	Manchester Giants	27	14	13	2351	2309	+42	28	Playoffs
6	Cheshire Phoenix	27	13	14	2272	2280	−8	26	Playoffs
7	Glasgow Rocks	27	12	15	2415	2471	−56	24	Playoffs
8	Plymouth City Patriots	27	12	15	2176	2319	−143	24	Playoffs
9	Newcastle Eagles	27	10	17	2313	2422	−109	20	
10	Surrey Scorchers	27	2	25	1959	2457	−498	4	

Updated to match(es) played on 24 April 2022. Source: BBC Sport
(C) Champions

=== Ladder progression ===
- Numbers highlighted in green indicate that the team finished the round inside the top eight.
- Numbers highlighted in blue indicates the team finished first on the ladder in that round.
- Numbers highlighted in red indicates the team finished last place on the ladder in that round.

2021–22 BBL Championship
Team	1	2	3	4	5	6	7	8	9	10	11	12	13	14	15	16	17	18	19	20	21	22	23	24
Bristol Flyers	–	6	6	7	7	6	4	4	4	5	3	3	5	7	7	8	8	7	7	7	8	8	5	4
Cheshire Phoenix	4	10	10	8	8	8	8	8	8	4	6	5	4	4	2	2	3	4	4	4	5	5	6	6
Glasgow Rocks	–	8	8	4	5	7	7	5	5	6	8	8	8	9	9	9	9	9	9	9	6	6	7	7
Leicester Riders	2	5	5	3	1	1	1	1	1	1	1	1	1	1	1	1	1	1	1	1	1	1	1	1
London Lions	–	4	4	2	4	5	6	7	7	8	7	6	6	6	6	6	5	5	5	5	2	4	4	3
Manchester Giants	3	3	1	1	2	4	3	3	2	2	2	2	2	3	4	4	4	2	2	2	3	3	3	5
Newcastle Eagles	5	2	3	5	6	3	5	6	6	7	5	7	7	5	5	5	6	8	8	8	9	9	9	9
Plymouth City Patriots	–	9	9	10	9	9	10	10	10	9	9	9	9	8	8	7	7	6	6	6	7	7	8	8
Sheffield Sharks	1	1	2	6	3	2	2	2	3	3	4	4	3	2	3	3	2	3	3	3	4	2	2	2
Surrey Scorchers	–	7	7	9	10	10	9	9	9	10	10	10	10	10	10	10	10	10	10	10	10	10	10	10

=== Championship ===
2021–22 game log
Total: 16–11 (home: 9–5; road: 7–6)
November: 2–0 (home: 1–0; road: 1–0)

Game	Date	Team	Score	High points	High rebounds	High assists	Location Attendance	Record
1	5 November	Cheshire Phoenix	W 113–74	Dirk Williams (22)	Jordan Williams (11)	Jordan Williams (10)	Copper Box Arena; 650	1–0
2	20 November	@ Surrey Scorchers	W 72–85	Isaiah Reese (24)	Jordan Williams (10)	Reese, J.Williams (6)	Surrey Sports Park; 1,000	2–0

December: 1–1 (home: 1–0; road: 0–1)

Game	Date	Team	Score	High points	High rebounds	High assists	Location Attendance	Record
3	3 December	@ Newcastle Eagles	L 96–84	Isaiah Reese (23)	Jordan Williams (10)	Reese, J.Williams (8)	Vertu Motors Arena; 2,500	2–1
4	5 December	Manchester Giants	W 107–80	Dirk Williams (30)	Julian Washburn (7)	Reese, Robinson, Washburn (5)	Copper Box Arena not available	3–1

January: 2–1 (home: 1–0; road: 1–1)

Game	Date	Team	Score	High points	High rebounds	High assists	Location Attendance	Record
5	1 January	@ Surrey Scorchers	L 78–77	Lorenzo Cugini (23)	Kylor Kelley (8)	Justin Robinson (7)	Surrey Sports Park; 1,000	3–2
6	23 January	Newcastle Eagles	W 103–94	Isaiah Reese (25)	Kelley, Washburn (7)	Cugini, Robinson (5)	Copper Box Arena; 800	4–2
7	28 January	@ Plymouth City Patriots	W 94–101	Reese, D.Williams (22)	Kylor Kelley (12)	Isaiah Reese (13)	Plymouth Pavilions not available	5–2

February: 2–2 (home: 1–2; road: 1–0)

Game	Date	Team	Score	High points	High rebounds	High assists	Location Attendance	Record
8	4 February	Leicester Riders	67–80	Dirk Williams (16)	Julian Washburn (13)	Isaiah Reese (6)	Copper Box Arena not available	5–3
9	13 February	Leicester Riders	W 79–77	Isaiah Reese (23)	Joshua Ward-Hibbert (9)	Isaiah Reese (3)	Copper Box Arena; 2,000	6–3
10	25 February	Plymouth City Patriots	L 81–83	Dirk Williams (20)	Dirk Williams (8)	Isaiah Reese (12)	Copper Box Arena not available	6–4
11	27 February	@ Plymouth City Patriots	W 73–77	Cugini, D.Williams (17)	Julian Washburn (9)	Isaiah Reese (9)	Plymouth Pavilions; 1,300	7–4

March: 4–3 (home: 1–2; road: 3–1)

Game	Date	Team	Score	High points	High rebounds	High assists	Location Attendance	Record
12	4 March	@ Glasgow Rocks	W 75–96	Reese, D.Williams (21)	Ryan Martin (8)	Isaiah Reese (11)	Emirates Arena; 400	8–4
13	6 March	Sheffield Sharks	L 76–83	Dirk Williams (21)	Kelly, Washburn (6)	Justin Robinson (5)	Copper Box Arena not available	8–5
14	13 March	@ Cheshire Phoenix	W 89–97	Kylor Kelley (20)	Kelly, D.Williams (7)	Lorenzo Cugini (5)	Cheshire Oaks Arena; 1,000	9–5
15	17 March	@ Manchester Giants	L 94–56	Dirk Williams (11)	Kylor Kelley (11)	Robinson, D.Williams (3)	National Basketball Centre; 500	9–6
16	25 March	Glasgow Rocks	L 92–100	Isaiah Reese (20)	Kylor Kelley (9)	Reese, J.Williams (4)	Copper Box Arena; 2,000	9–7
17	26 March	@ Bristol Flyers	W 74–77	Isaiah Reese (16)	Cugini, Tawiah (8)	Isaiah Reese (7)	SGS College Arena not available	10–7
18	30 March	Newcastle Eagles	W 92–74	Isaiah Reese (20)	Kylor Kelley (17)	Isaiah Reese (8)	Copper Box Arena; 500	11–7

April: 5–4 (home: 4–1; road: 1–3)

Game	Date	Team	Score	High points	High rebounds	High assists	Location Attendance	Record
19	1 April	Bristol Flyers	W 79–66	Isaiah Reese (21)	Kylor Kelley (12)	Justin Robinson (5)	Copper Box Arena; 1,000	12–7
20	3 April	Sheffield Sharks	W 69–54	Isaiah Reese (25)	Kelley, Tawiah (8)	Lorenzo Cugini (4)	Copper Box Arena not available	13–7
21	6 April	Bristol Flyers	L 74–78	Isaiah Reese (25)	Kelley, Washburn (8)	Isaiah Reese (8)	Copper Box Arena; 1,500	13–8
22	10 April	@ Glasgow Rocks	L 83–75	Robinson, Washburn (17)	Chris Tawiah (8)	Isaiah Reese (7)	Emirates Arena; 400	13–9
23	15 April	@ Sheffield Sharks	L 78–71 (OT)	Isaiah Reese (22)	Kelley, Washburn (7)	Reese, J.Williams (5)	Ponds Forge; 800	13–10
24	17 April	@ Leicester Riders	L 103–67	Lorenzo Cugini (16)	Chris Tawiah (11)	Isaiah Reese (6)	Morningside Arena not available	13–11
25	20 April	Surrey Scorchers	W 92–71	Cugini, Reese (18)	Julian Washburn (9)	Lorenzo Cugini (4)	Surrey Sports Park not available	14–11
26	22 April	Cheshire Phoenix	W 99–62	Isaiah Reese (26)	Kylor Kelley (9)	Isaiah Reese (7)	Copper Box Arena; 1,500	15–11
27	24 April	@ Manchester Giants	W 80–90	Isaiah Reese (32)	Kelley, Washburn (9)	Isaiah Reese (8)	National Basketball Centre not available	16–11

2021–22 season schedule

== BBL Trophy ==
=== Trophy ===
2021–22 game log
Total: 4–1 (home: 1–1; road: 3–0)
January: 1–0 (home: 0–0; road: 1–0)

Game	Date	Team	Score	High points	High rebounds	High assists	Location Attendance	Record
1	14 January 2022	@ Newcastle Eagles	W 70–84	Dirk Williams (18)	Kylor Kelley (10)	Isaiah Reese (15)	Vertu Motors Arena; 2,400	1–0

February: 2–0 (home: 0–0; road: 2–0)

Game	Date	Team	Score	High points	High rebounds	High assists	Location Attendance	Record
2	6 February	@ Manchester Giants	W 79–90	Dirk Williams (28)	Kylor Kelley (8)	Isaiah Reese (9)	National Basketball Centre; 1,000	2–0
3	19 February	@ Bristol Flyers	W 61–81	Dirk Williams (19)	Julian Washburn (15)	Isaiah Reese (14)	SGS College Arena not available	3–0

March: 1–1 (home: 1–1; road: 0–0)

Game	Date	Team	Score	High points	High rebounds	High assists	Location Attendance	Record
4	9 March	Bristol Flyers	W 85–81	Dirk Williams (22)	Tawiah, D.Williams (6)	Justin Robinson (8)	Copper Box Arena; 500	4–0
5	20 March	Cheshire Phoenix	L 68–82	Dirk Williams (24)	Chris Tawiah (6)	Kaboza, Robinson (5)	Emirates Arena; 5,900	4–1

== BBL Playoffs ==
=== Playoffs ===
2022 playoff game log
Total: 1–1 (home: 1–0; road: 0–1)
Quarter-finals: 1–1 (home: 1–0; road: 0–1)

Game	Date	Team	Score	High points	High rebounds	High assists	Location Attendance	Series
1	29 April	Cheshire Phoenix	W 85–69	Julian Washburn (17)	Julian Washburn (10)	Julian Washburn (6)	Copper Box Arena not available	1–0
2	1 May	@ Cheshire Phoenix	L 97–95	Isaiah Reese (24)	Ryan Martin (7)	Isaiah Reese (7)	Cheshire Oaks Arena; 800	1–1

Semi-finals: 2–0 (home: 1–0; road: 1–0)

Game	Date	Team	Score	High points	High rebounds	High assists	Location Attendance	Series
3	6 May	@ Bristol Flyers	W 83–85	Isaiah Reese (24)	Ryan Martin (7)	Isaiah Reese (12)	SGS College Arena; 770	2–1
4	8 May	Bristol Flyers	W 91–73	Isaiah Reese (28)	Isaiah Reese (8)	Isaiah Reese (8)	Copper Box Arena; 1,800	3–1

Playoff final: 0–1 (home: 0–0; road: 0–1)

Game	Date	Team	Score	High points	High rebounds	High assists	Location Attendance	Series
5	15 May	@ Leicester Riders	L 78–75	Isaiah Reese (29)	Chris Tawiah (14)	Isaiah Reese (7)	The O2 Arena; 15,824	3–2

2022 playoffs schedule

== Transactions ==
=== Re-signed ===
Player	Signed
Jordan Spencer	28 July
Dirk Williams	29 July
Chris Tawiah	29 July
Joshua Ward-Hibbert	29 July

=== Additions ===
Player	Signed	Former team
Julian Washburn	9 July	Delaware Blue Coats
Isaiah Reese	12 July	Guelph Nighthawks
Jordan Williams	15 July	Worcester Wolves
Kylor Kelley	21 July	Austin Spurs
Lorenzo Cugini	2 August	Destino Palencia
Will Neighbour	28 August	Plymouth Raiders
Marquis Teague	29 August	Memphis Hustle
Aurimas Majauskas	13 September	BC Zaporizhya
Ryan Martin	11 February	Tsmoki-Minsk
Bradley Kaboza	6 March	London Lions II

=== Subtractions ===
Player	Reason left	New team
Jules Dang-Akodo	Free agent	Cheshire Phoenix
Shane Walker	Free agent	Bristol Flyers
Fahro Alihodžić	Free agent	Charilaos Trikoupis
Joe Ikhinmwin	Retired	N/A
Kingsley Okoroh	Free agent	Plymouth City Patriots
Marquis Teague	11 February	N/A
Aurimas Majauskas	11 February	N/A
Jordan Spencer	Free Agent	N/A

== See also ==
- 2021–22 British Basketball League season
- London Lions
