= Frederick Flying Cows =

Semi-Professional Basketball Team

- First season: 2024
- League: 94x50 League
- Location: Frederick, Maryland
- Arena: Woodsboro Bank Arena at Hood College
- Colors: Purple, Green, White
- Owner: Anthony Mazlish, Michael Witt
- Head coach: Dan Prete
- General manager: Chris Jenkins
- Website: www.goflyingcows.com

The Frederick Flying Cows are an American professional basketball team based in Frederick, Maryland. Founded in 2023, the team competes in 94x50 League and plays their home games at Woodsboro Bank Arena on the campus of Hood College.

The Flying Cows came back from a 24-point 2nd half deficit to defeat the Reading Rebels 113-112 in their first-ever game as part of The Basketball League on March 2, 2024. The game was highlighted by a last-second game-winning three-pointer by forward Caleb Wood. In their first season they had a 20-4 record.

== Background ==
The team is owned by two Bethesda area businessmen, Anthony Mazlish and Michael Witt, who met over 30 years ago playing in pickup basketball leagues in Washington, DC. In 2022, Both men had recently sold their businesses and were looking for a way to stay involved in the community and spread the game of basketball. In June 2022, Mazlish read an ESPN article about Toledo Glass Forward Myles Copeland, who used his instincts and firefighter training to administer CPR and help save the life of referee John Sculli, who collapsed and became unresponsive during their TBL playoff game against the Jamestown Jackals. This led Mazlish to further research the TBL, and he and Witt ultimately decided to invest in a new team. The two considered many different locations across the DMV area before ultimately deciding on Frederick. “We liked the idea of setting this up in an area where there was a separate community, where there was its own identity,” Witt said. “It's growing, feels very vibrant, has its own personality and it's separate.”

== Formation ==
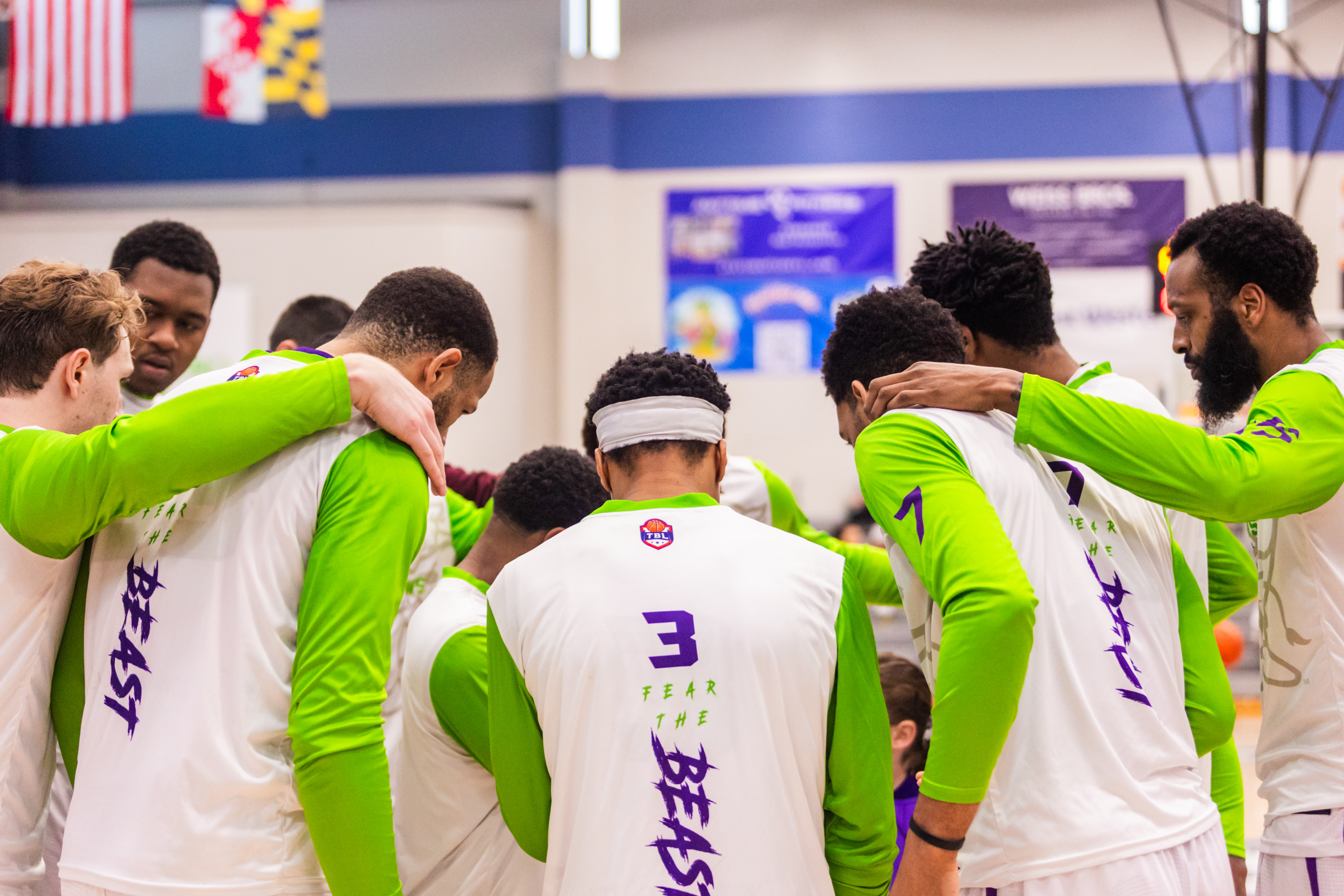
Flying Cows in March 2025

On August 22, 2023, a press conference was held, at Hood College, to officially announce the formation of the team to the Frederick community. At the press conference, the team also announced the hiring of head coach, Ed Corporal, and their first player signee, Tavares Sledge. Corporal holds the distinction of being the winningest coach in TBL history, with a winning percentage of .832 in 5 seasons. Corporal is known to emphasize defense in his coaching, stating, “The first thing I preach when we get to training camp is defense — no matter if we’re hitting shots that night or not, our defense never waivers,” He also coached the 2021 Enid Outlaws to a 30-3 record, the best single season record in league history, and a TBL championship. Sledge contributed to the 2021 Enid team, averaging 16.7 points and 10.0 rebounds. The Flying Cows also announced the signing of shooting guard Charlie Marquardt and point guard Tevin Foster.

The name was not announced until September 10 after a fan voting contest held to determine the official name. The name was announced as the "Flying Cows" at Frederick's annual "In The Streets" festival. The team hired Frederick native, Chris Jenkins, to serve as the general manager. Jenkins has a background in sports and event management, having directed the award-winning Governor's Challenge High School Basketball Tournament in Salisbury, Maryland for the past seven years.

The Flying Cows held tryouts throughout the fall of 2023 to find local talent, and announced the signing of local Frederick star, Steve Custis. Custis was a standout player at Frederick High School before playing collegiately at Fairmont State University in Fairmont, West Virginia.

On February 4, 2024, the Flying Cows made their first ever TBL draft pick, selecting Caleb Wood, a 6'4" guard, who played collegiately at the University of Pennsylvania. Wood was selected 9th overall. The Flying Cows also drafted Tyrone Jones, a 6'5" guard/forward, with the 42nd overall pick, and Fabian Givens, a 6'2" guard, with the 68th overall pick.

== 2024 Season ==
On February 18, the Flying Cows fell to the Montreal Toundra 98-89 in an Exhibition game. Tavares Sledge collected 18 points and 6 rebounds.

=== Opening Night Win ===
The Flying Cows' Inaugural regular season game was played on March 2 at what was called BB&T Arena at the time, but is now called Woodsboro Bank Arena. In front of 1,057 fans, The Flying Cows defeated the Reading Rebels 113-112 for their first win in franchise history. Frederick trailed by as many as 24 points in the 3rd quarter and trailed 93-75 to begin the final period, before a huge rally brought them back into the game. With 13 seconds left, Charlie Marquardt hit a jumper to put Frederick up 110-109, but Reading point guard, Aquille Carr, drew a foul on the next possession and made both free throws to put Reading back ahead 111-110 with 11 seconds left. Frederick was unable to score on the next possession and Carr was fouled again after securing the rebound with 1.1 seconds remaining. He missed the first free-throw and made the second to give Reading a 112-110 lead. Coach Ed Corporal used a timeout to advance the ball, and on the ensuing inbound play, Caleb Wood flashed to the near corner, received the pass from inbounder, Damien Daniels, and buried a three pointer as time expired to give the Flying Cows the victory. Wood, who had only played just over 2 minutes, was making his pro basketball debut and was attempting only his 2nd field goal of the game. “It’s a play I got from the Boston Celtics a long time ago,” Corporal said. “We had three or four options to go with, so we went with Caleb on that last shot.” Reportedly, the fans stormed the court in celebration following Wood's shot. Tavares Sledge played a large role in the victory as well, scoring 39 points and grabbing 12 rebounds

Frederick defeated the Virginia Valley Vipers the following afternoon, as well as the Connecticut Crusaders on March 8, before a 104-88 win over the West Virginia Grind gave the Cows a 4-0 record at the end of their first homestand.

After suffering their first loss 104-102 to the Raleigh Firebirds on March 14, The Flying Cows recorded seven straight wins to move their record to 11-1. The last win in the streak was a rematch against the Firebirds, in which the Cows prevailed 112-97

The Flying Cows fell from first to second place in the Atlantic Northeast after a 137-119 road loss to Reading on April 25, but got the top spot back after defeating the Rebels 101-97 in their third meeting on May 10 in Frederick.

On May 12, The Flying Cows defeated the Tri-State Admirals 136-64 to set a franchise record for margin of victory (72 points). The win also clinched a playoff spot for Frederick.

== 2025 Season ==
The Frederick Flying Cows concluded their 2025 season with a standout 21–3 regular season record, earning them the title of Mid-Atlantic Division Champions in The Basketball League (TBL). Building on their strong regular-season performance, the Cows advanced through the playoffs and were crowned Southeastern Conference Champions, marking a significant milestone in the franchise’s history.

Their postseason run carried them to the Regional Round—also referred to as the TBL Final Four or semifinals—where they faced the Capital Seahawks in a best-of-three series. The Flying Cows were ultimately eliminated after dropping the series 0–2. The final game was held on June 14, 2025, and ended in a narrow 88–92 loss.

The 2025 campaign marked the team's deepest playoff push to date and solidified their position as one of the TBL’s premier emerging franchises.

== 2026 Season ==
The team left the TBL to become a founding member of the 94x50 League in 2026.
