= Bakersfield Majestics =

Basketball team

- Division: Western
- League: USBL 2026–present TBL 2022–2025
- Founded: 2021
- History: Bakersfield Magic 2022; Bakersfield Majestics 2022–present
- Arena: Bakersfield College
- Location: Bakersfield, California
- Team colors: Royal blue, light blue, silver
- General manager: L. Dee Slade
- Head coach: Desmon Farmer
- Ownership: Vaughn Hicks
- Website: Official website
Home	Away

The Bakersfield Majestics, formerly the Bakersfield Magic, are an American basketball team based in Bakersfield, California. They currently compete in the United States Basketball League, and were previously members of The Basketball League (TBL).

== Starting the franchise ==
From 2006 to 2016, Bakersfield, California, was home to the Bakersfield Jam of the NBA Development League. The team played at Rabobank Arena until 2009 and later at the Jam Events Center. On May 9, 2014, the Jam entered a hybrid affiliation with the Phoenix Suns, giving the Suns exclusive affiliation with the team while allowing the Jam to operate under their own management. On April 12, 2016, the Suns announced that the organization had purchased the Jam and were relocating the franchise to the town of Prescott Valley, Arizona, for the 2016–17 season to become the Northern Arizona Suns. In response, the previous owners of the Jam franchise, Stan Ellis and David Higdon, announced that they had been working with the D-League in securing a new franchise and affiliation before the 2016–17 season, although it did not come to fruition.

In June 2021, it was first reported by KGET-TV that Bakersfield would host the Bakersfield Magic in The Basketball League for the 2022 season. On August 5, 2021, it was announced that Spencer Norman, previously announced as the team market owner for the Fresno Fire, would be the team market owner. Karaya Gage was initially announced as the team's first head coach, making her the first African-American woman to serve as head coach of a men's professional basketball team. However, after coaching the team during a pre-season exhibition against members of the Bakersfield Police Department on January 29, 2022, Gage quietly left the organization. The team then announced that Peter Pang would serve as the new head coach, becoming the first Chinese-American to coach a professional basketball team in the United States. Lawrence "Doc" Holliday was the team's initial general manager. However, the team had announced on March 22, 2022, that Holliday had died.

On April 1, 2022, The Bakersfield Magic announced that L. Dee Slade would take over as the new general manager of the team.

== Inaugural season ==
The Magic played their first exhibition game on January 29, 2022, against members of the Bakersfield Police Department. No official score of the game was kept, and the scoreboard itself was reset multiple times. The Magic 'won' the game easily.

Head Coach Karaya Gage left the organization shortly after the 2022 TBL Draft in Indianapolis, Indiana. Peter Pang was eventually named as Gage's replacement going into the team's first regular season.

Their first official TBL game came on March 4, 2022. Initially, they were to play against the Temecula Eagles, however the Eagles dropped out of play and the schedule was changed. Instead, the Magic played back-to-back road games against the SoCal Moguls, dropping both. The Magic made their home debut with a loss to the California Sea-Kings on March 11, 2022, then picked up their first home win the next night against the Vancouver Volcanoes.

After losing on the road to the Salem Capitals, Vancouver Volcanoes and San Diego Sharks, the Magic picked up their first road win against the SoCal Moguls on March 26, 2022.

For reasons not publicly specified, injured player Jacob Berry would serve as the interim head coach on May 14 against the Salem Capitals with neither head coach Peter Pang nor assistant coach Vaughn Hicks in attendance. The Magic lost a low-scoring game, 81–77. Coach Pang and Coach Hicks would return for the remainder of the season.

The Magic finished their first TBL season with 4 wins to 20 losses. Due to the TBL's playoff format allowing six teams from each conference to enter, all six Western Conference teams qualified, with the Magic taking the #6 seed.

On Wednesday, June 1, the Magic lost their first playoff game at home to the San Diego Sharks, 137–132. Game 2 would be on Friday, June 3 in San Diego. Seven of the Magic's twelve players did not show up. In addition, assistant coach Vaughn Hicks served as the interim head coach. The Magic lost 123–117, being eliminated from the playoffs 2–0.

== 2023 TBL season ==
On September 12, 2022, Evelyn Magley, CEO of The Basketball League (TBL), announced a new franchise called the Bakersfield Majestics for the 2023 season. The team will be operated by team market owner Vaughn Hicks and general manager LDee Slade.
