= Jason Conrad =

American basketball player (born 1989)

Personal information
- Born: April 23, 1989 (age 35); Mountain View, California, U.S.
- Listed height: 7 ft 0 in (2.13 m)
- Listed weight: 240 lb (109 kg)

Career information
- High school: Gilroy (Gilroy, California)
- College: Chico State (2009–2013)
- NBA draft: 2013: undrafted
- Playing career: 2013–present
- Position: Center

Career history
- 2013–2014: ZZ Leiden
- 2014: Moncton Miracles
- 2015: Perry Lakes Hawks
- 2016: Westfalen Mustangs
- 2016: South West Metro Pirates
- 2019: Yakima SunKings
- 2021: California Sea-Kings
- 2022–2023: Salem Capitals

Jason William Conrad (born April 23, 1989) is an American professional basketball player. He played college basketball for Chico State before playing professionally in the Netherlands, Canada, Australia and Germany.

== High school career ==
Conrad attended Gilroy High School in Gilroy, California, where he was ranked by Scout.com as one of the top center prospects on the west coast in 2008. As a sophomore in 2005–06, he was named second-team All-League after averaging 7.4 points, 9.1 rebounds and 4.2 blocks per game. He was also named the Bob Hagen Tournament Most Valuable Player, and earned Valley Christian All-Tournament honors as Gilroy won the 2006 Tri-County League Championship. As a junior in 2006–07, he averaged 10 points, 11 rebounds and four blocks per game as he earned second-team All-Tri-County Athletic League honors. He was also named in the Bob Hagen Memorial All-Tournament Team and led the Tri-County League in rebounds and blocked shots.

On November 14, 2007, Conrad signed a National Letter of Intent to play college basketball for Portland State University.

As a senior in 2007–08, Conrad was a preseason McDonald's All-American candidate, and went on to average 18 points, 16 rebounds and four blocks per game before sustaining a season-ending leg injury on December 23, 2007. In one game against San Lorenzo Valley before the injury, Conrad finished with 27 points, 23 rebounds and 11 blocks. He also notched 18 points, 14 rebounds and five blocks against Oakland Tech.

== College career ==
After sitting out the entire 2008–09 season with Portland State, Conrad decided to transfer, and on April 24, 2009, he signed with Chico State of the NCAA Division II.

As a freshman playing for the Chico State Wildcats in 2009–10, Conrad became the tallest player in Chico State basketball history. In 25 games (one start), he averaged 2.8 points and 2.8 rebounds in 11.6 minutes per game. As a sophomore in 2010–11, he averaged 1.5 points and 2.4 rebounds in 27 games (no starts). In 33 games (32 starts) as a junior in 2011–12, he averaged 5.2 points and 3.7 rebounds in 17.0 minutes per game. In 29 games (all starts) as a senior in 2012–13, he averaged 6.2 points, 4.8 rebounds and 1.2 blocks in 21.8 minutes per game. He was named the team's Defensive Player of the Year as a senior and finished as the school's third all-time leading shot blocker with 84 career blocked shots.

== Professional career ==
After graduating from college, Conrad spent time in the Sacramento Professional Development League and travelled to China as a member of the NetScouts USA All-Star team.

Conrad began his professional career in the Netherlands, signing with Zorg en Zekerheid Leiden of the Dutch Basketball League on August 5, 2013. On November 6, 2013, he recorded seven blocks against the Bakken Bears to set the best mark for blocks in a game during the 2013–14 EuroChallenge season. He was cut from the roster on January 8, 2014, after averaging 4.5 points and 2.7 rebounds in 15 league games. He also averaged 2.2 points, 4.7 rebounds and 1.5 blocks in six EuroChallenge games.

In August 2014, Conrad signed with the Moncton Miracles of the Canadian National Basketball League. He was cut from the roster on December 2, 2014, after averaging 5.1 points and 5.4 rebounds in eight games.

On January 19, 2015, Conrad signed with the Perry Lakes Hawks in Australia for the 2015 State Basketball League season. He was cut from the roster on March 30, 2015, due to a reported back injury, after averaging 7.8 points, 6.0 rebounds and 1.5 blocks in four games.

In January 2016, Conrad moved to Germany to play out the season with the Westfalen Mustangs. In May 2016, he returned to Australia to play for the South West Metro Pirates of the Queensland Basketball League. In 13 games for the Pirates in 2016, he averaged 8.6 points, 6.2 rebounds and 1.5 assists per game.

In December 2018, Conrad signed with the Yakima SunKings of The Basketball League (TBL). He averaged 6.85 points and 5.85 rebounds during the 2019 season.

Conrad had short stints in the TBL in 2021 with the California Sea-Kings and in 2022 with the Salem Capitals. He returned to the Capitals in 2023.

== Personal life ==
Both of Conrad's parents played collegiately at Santa Clara University. His father, Bill, competed in baseball, while his mother, Karin, was a volleyball player. His older sister, Kristina, played volleyball at San Jose State University.

In December 2020, Conrad became the inaugural owner of the Salem Capitals, a new franchise in The Basketball League (TBL).
