= Patterson High School (Maryland) =

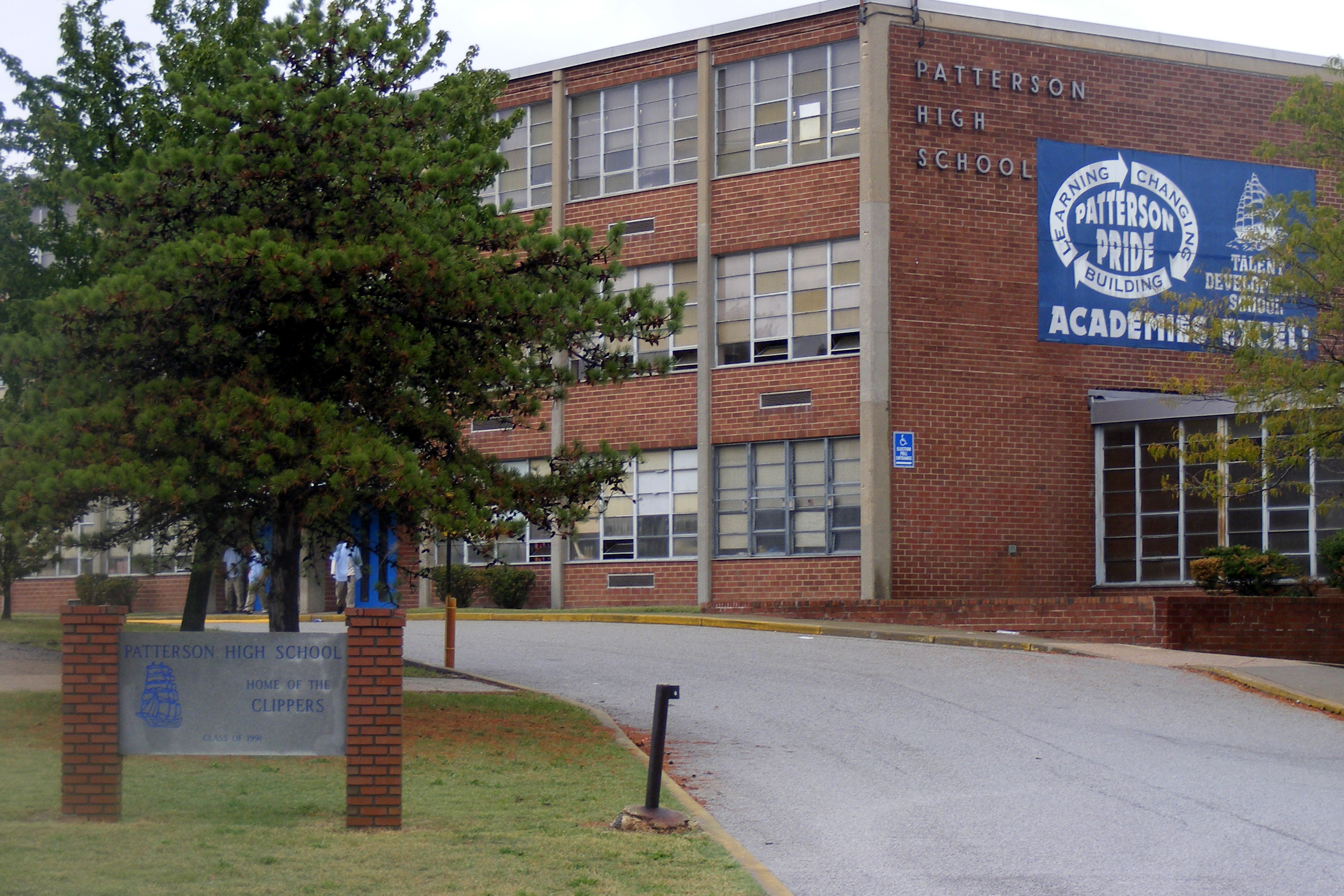
- Patterson High School in October 2007

Location
- 100 Kane Street; Baltimore, Maryland 21224; United States; 39°17′33″N 76°32′11″W

Information
- School type: Public high school
- Motto: "Patterson Pride"
- School district: Baltimore City Public Schools
- School number: 405
- Principal: April Myrick
- Grades: 9–12
- Enrollment: 1335 (2014)
- Area: Urban
- Colors: Royal blue, white
- Mascot: Clipper Ship
- Team name: Patterson Clippers
- Website: https://www.baltimorecityschools.org/o/patterson-clippers

Patterson High School (formerly known as Patterson Park High School) is a public high school located in the Hopkins-Bayview neighborhood in Baltimore, Maryland, United States.

== Overview ==
Patterson High School is a comprehensive high school with approximately 1200 students, grades nine through twelve. Patterson no longer operates as academies, but instead as a cohort model. Students are divided into cohorts based on their year of expected graduation.

Patterson is designated as the Career Center school for Baltimore's East Side. The school is a social emotional learning, student wholeness site that offers multiple pathways in Career and Technology Education (CTE); Patterson students take pathway courses during their tenth, eleventh, and twelfth grade years, in addition to Maryland State Graduation Requirements, University of Maryland Systems requirements, and a wide variety of elective courses. Pathways at Patterson for the 2019–20 school year include:

- Academy of Engineering / Project Lead the Way
- Computer Science
- Certified Nursing Assistant
- Pharmacy Technician
- Emergency Medical Technician
- Homeland Security & Emergency Preparedness
- Advertising & Graphic Design
- Administrative Services
- Early Childhood Education
- Cosmetic Services
- Construction Design & Management(CADD)
- Finance & Accounting
- Air Force J-ROTC
- Band

Patterson has a diverse student population. The ESOL Program has both Emergent and Newcomers Program and support for ESOL students throughout their integrated classes by offering mentoring and partnerships with Liberty's Promise and Refugee Youth Program.

In 2012 a Patterson student won first place in the Baltimore City Math Bowl.

Patterson High School is the assumed school which Hairspray’s main character, Tracy Turnblad, goes to.

== Academics ==
Patterson High School gained media attention in 2022 when a report showed 75 percent of students tested at the school were reading and doing math at an elementary school level. The school's attendance rate was 59 percent, compared to the district average of 80 percent, and dropout rate was 29 percent, with a college enrollment rate of 21 percent, meaning "more students quit school than enroll in higher education". Maryland Governor Larry Hogan commented, "Baltimore City School system is not doing a great job educating the kids...I was disgusted by it".

== Athletics ==
In 1993, Patterson, along with all the other Baltimore City public schools, left the Maryland Scholastic Association (MSA) to join the Maryland Public Secondary Schools Athletic Association (MPSSAA). The move meant that Baltimore City Public Schools would be able to compete with the rest of the state's public schools in a variety of sports arenas. Since the move, the Clippers have been to the state semi-finals in 1994, 1999, 2004 and to the quarter-finals in 1993, 1995, 1996, 1998 and 2001.

== Notable alumni ==
- Peter Angelos – trial lawyer and owner of the Baltimore Orioles
- Sonny Askew – soccer player and coach, played several seasons with clubs the NASL, ASL, and MISL. Received four caps to the United States men's national team.
- Dick Bielski – NFL running back
- Aquille Carr – basketball player
- Robert F. Chew – actor, known for his role as Proposition Joe in the TV series The Wire
- Raymond A. Dypski – member of the Maryland House of Delegates
- Cal Ermer – MLB player and coach
- Ed Listopad – NFL player
- Fred Manfra – radio play-by-play announcer for the Baltimore Orioles
- Aris Melissaratos – businessman and government official
- Dave Pivec – former NFL player, owner of Pivec Advertising and MLL's Baltimore Bayhawks
- Carl Runk – football and lacrosse coach at Towson University
- Perry Sfikas – member of the Maryland State Senate
- Theodore J. Sophocleus – member of the Maryland House of Delegates
- Joe Speca – soccer player and coach
- Larry Surock - soccer player who was a member of the United States 1952 Olympic Soccer Team.
- Gary Tuggle - police officer and Drug Enforcement Administration (DEA) agent who served as acting commissioner of the Baltimore Police Department from 2018 to 2019.
