= Dime Magazine =

American basketball magazine

- Categories: Sports
- Founded: 2001
- Company: Warner Music Group
- Country: United States
- Language: English
- Website: uproxx.com/dimemag/
- ISSN: 1554-7159

Dime Magazine is an American basketball magazine that was created by Patrick Cassidy and Josh Gotthelf and began circulation in 2001. The magazine publishes six issues a year for its worldwide readership, as well as a handful of editions of Dime China, a Chinese-language version consisting of regular Dime content translated from English and original content from editorial staff in China. It makes an appearance as an endorsement in NBA 2K12, and NBA 2K13. It is owned by Uproxx, itself a subsidiary of Warner Music Group.

== History ==
Dime was created as a "basketball lifestyle" magazine, covering not only the sport but the off-court lives and lifestyles of its athletes and personalities. The concept is reflected in the magazine's tagline, "The Game. The Player. The Life." Whereas most basketball (and sports) magazines only feature athletes wearing their uniforms, Dime often photographs athletes away from the court, wearing casual or business-casual attire. The first issue of Dime had Allen Iverson on the cover. The covers of Dime have featured the biggest names in basketball. The magazine has established a history of giving up-and-coming stars their first-ever international magazine covers, starting with Dwight Howard in 2003 and continuing with the likes of Dwyane Wade, O. J. Mayo, Chris Paul, Tyreke Evans, Lance Stephenson, Brandon Roy, Rajon Rondo and Aquille Carr. Kobe Bryant has had the most Dime covers to date, having appeared on the cover five times.

== Magazine features ==
- "INK" - Photo gallery featuring players' tattoos, where the subject explains the origin behind all or some of his favorite pieces of body art.
- "Baller's Blueprint" - First-person feature where NBA players describe their signature moves and how they execute them.
- "What's My Name?" - One-page profiles on players who are usually not very popular on the mainstream level, often in high school or college. Notable "What's My Name?" alumni include Rudy Gay, Kevin Love, Rodney Stuckey and Blake Griffin. Notable international and female players have also been featured.
- "Big Business" - Articles highlighting people with jobs and careers in the basketball industry; agents, sneaker designers, team owners, etc.
- "Dime Fashion" - Photo gallery where one player models new and upcoming designer fashions.
- "Street Seen" - A "man on the street" photo shoot highlight the current fashion trends among Dime's 18-34 male demographic, often at sneaker boutiques around the country.
- "The Pitch" - Usually a college coach giving a first-person hypothetical recruiting pitch, or someone else with a career in the basketball industry—like an agent—hypothetically pitching a player on their services.
- "Tangled Web" - Short reviews of popular and obscure websites, related and unrelated to basketball.
- "Dimepiece" - A photo spread usually featuring scantily-clad female models with some kind of basketball tie-in.
- "We Reminisce" - Retrospective feature, either an article or a single photo, paying homage to "old-school" basketball players and/or teams.
- "Player's Ball" - Annual NCAA college basketball season preview.

== Cover athletes by issue ==
- Dime #1: Allen Iverson
- Dime #2: Tracy McGrady
- Dime #3: Kenyon Martin
- Dime #4: Baron Davis
- Dime #5: Paul Pierce
- Dime #6: Allen Iverson / Steve Francis
- Dime #7: Kobe Bryant
- Dime #8: Stephon Marbury
- Dime #9: Gary Payton / Dwight Howard
- Dime #10: Ricky Davis
- Dime #11: Ray Allen / Latrell Sprewell
- Dime #12: Philip Champion a.k.a. "Hot Sauce"
- Dime #13: Dwyane Wade
- Dime #14: Amar'e Stoudemire
- Dime #15: Chris Webber
- Dime #16: Carmelo Anthony
- Dime #17: O. J. Mayo
- Dime #18: Fat Joe / Chris Lowery a.k.a. "Skywalker"
- Dime #19: Dwyane Wade
- Dime #20: Jermaine O'Neal
- Dime #21: Vince Carter
- Dime #22: Kobe Bryant
- Dime #23: Chris Paul (This issue also included special-release regional covers of Stephon Marbury, Paul Pierce and Ben Gordon.)
- Dime #24: Tyreke Evans
- Dime #25: Carmelo Anthony
- Dime #26: Dwyane Wade
- Dime #27: Tracy McGrady
- Dime #28: Allen Iverson
- Dime #29: Gilbert Arenas
- Dime #30: Kevin Garnett
- Dime #31: LeBron James
- Dime #32: Kevin Durant
- Dime #33: Chris Bosh
- Dime #34: "The Dream Team" - Lance Stephenson, Tyreke Evans, Jrue Holiday, Derrick Favors & Luke Babbitt
- Dime #35: Greg Oden
- Dime #36: Chris Paul
- Dime #37: Dwight Howard / Carmelo Anthony
- Dime #38: Shaquille O'Neal
- Dime #39: Kobe Bryant
- Dime #40: Michael Beasley
- Dime #41: "The Best Season Ever"
- Dime #42: Lance Stephenson
- Dime #43: Kobe Bryant
- Dime #44: Gilbert Arenas
- Dime #45: Kevin Garnett
- Dime #46: Brandon Jennings
- Dime #47: LeBron James
- Dime #48: Brandon Roy
- Dime #49: Blake Griffin
- Dime #50: Derrick Rose
- Dime #51: Kevin Durant
- Dime #52: Amar'e Stoudemire
- Dime #53: Carmelo Anthony
- Dime #54: Dwyane Wade
- Dime #55: Kobe Bryant
- Dime #56: Rajon Rondo
- Dime #57: John Wall
- Dime #58: LeBron James
- Dime #59: Kevin Durant
- Dime #60: Dwight Howard
- Dime #61: Chris Paul
- Dime #62: Blake Griffin
- Dime #63: Derrick Rose
- Dime #64: Kevin Durant & Russell Westbrook
- Dime #65: Aquille Carr
- Dime #66: John Wall
