= Isaiah Reese =

American basketball player (born 1996)

- Reese with BC Uralmash in 2025

Free agent
- Position: Point guard

Personal information
- Born: December 13, 1996 (age 29) Miami, Florida, U.S.
- Listed height: 6 ft 5 in (1.96 m)
- Listed weight: 184 lb (83 kg)

Career information
- High school: Miami Christian School
- College: Canisius College (2016–2019)
- NBA draft: 2019: undrafted
- Playing career: 2019–present

Career history
- 2019–2021: Santa Cruz Warriors
- 2021: Guelph Nighthawks
- 2021–2022: London Lions
- 2022: Hamilton Honey Badgers
- 2022: Samara
- 2022–2024: Parma
- 2024: Merkezefendi Belediyesi Denizli Basket
- 2024–2025: Promitheas Patras B.C.
- 2025–2026: Uralmash

Career highlights
- All-Greek Basketball League Second Team (2025); British Basketball League All-Imports Team (2022); All-British Basketball League First Team (2022); All-British Basketball League Forward of the Year (2022); All-MAAC First Team (2018)

Isaiah Reese (born December 13, 1996) is an American professional basketball player who last played for the Uralmash of the VTB United League. He played college basketball for Canisius College.

== Early life and high school ==
Reese attended Miami Christian School where he played basketball. He served as a team captain and earned All-Dade County First-Team honors as a senior and was named the Junior Orange Bowl Tournament MVP.

== College career ==
On June 29, 2016, Reese committed to Canisius College for the 2016–2017 school year under Coach Reggie Witherspoon. Reese was one of the first players to join the Canisius program since Witherspoon took over as the program's head new coach. He came to Canisius after spending the 2015–2016 academic year at DME Academy in Daytona Beach, Florida.

On December 12, 2016, Reese was named the MAAC Rookie of the Week after he averaged 16.5 points, 5.5 rebounds, and 3 assists per game in a pair of non-league games. He was the first Canisius freshman to earn the conference's rookie of the week award since the 2014–2015 season. On December 27, 2016, Reese was named the MAAC Rookie of the Week again. This was the second time in the last three weeks where he was honored as the conference's top rookie performer. He was the second MAAC freshman that year to earn the league's rookie of the week honors twice.

On November 20, 2017, Reese was named MAAC Player of the Week. He averaged 18.5 points, 7.5 rebounds, 7.5 assists and 2 steals per game in non-league games against United States Air Force Academy and Youngstown State University. He was the first NCAA Division I player to record a triple-double that season and he was the first MAAC player to reach the feat since Scott Machado from Iona had a triple-double at Marist University on February 12, 2012. On January 22, 2018, Reese was named the MAAC's Player of the Week after he averaged 21.5 points, 5 rebounds, 5.5 assists and 4.5 steals in road victories against Manhattan College and Iona University. This was the second time that season that Reese earned the league's player of the week honors. On February 26, 2018, Reese was again named MAAC Player of the Week after the team beat Niagara University and Marist to secure a share of the 2017-2018 MAAC regular-season championship. This was the third time that season that he was honored as the MAAC Player of the Week. He avereaged 21.5 points per game, 3.5 rebounds, 6.5 assists and 2 steals per game. He was also named to the All-MAAC First Time, making him the first Canisius guard to have that honor since Billy Baron in 2013–2014.

On March 15, 2018, Reese was named to the 2017-2018 National Association of Basketball Coaches Division I All-District Second Team. He was the first Golden Griffin to earn NABC All-District honors since Billy Baron was recognized after the 2013–2014 season.

On April 11, 2018, Reese placed his name into consideration for the 2018 NBA Draft, but added that he would not sign with an agent to preserve his college eligibility. He became the first Canisius sophomore since 1994 to earn All-MAAC First Team honors after he averaged 16.9 points, 5.8 rebounds, 4.7 assists, and 2.2 steals per game during the 2017–2018 season. On May 29, 2018, he withdrew his name from consideration for the 2018 NBA Draft. During that time, he participated in pre-draft workouts with the Boston Celtics, Denver Nuggets, and the Houston Rockets. He would retain his seasons of college eligibility.

On June 20, 2018, Reese was named the Canisius College Most Improved Player for the 2017–2018 season. He became the first Canisius player in program's history to record a triple-double when he posted 23 points, 11 rebounds, and 11 assists in the team's win over Youngstown State University.

On October 23, 2018, Reese was named the 2018-2019 MAAC Preseason Player of the Year. He joined former Canisius guard, Billy Baron, as the only two players in program history to be named the MAAC Preseason Player of the Year.

On November 27, 2018, Reese was one of 50 mid-major players named to the 2018-2019 Lou Henson Award Watch List. He is the only player from MAAC school to make that year's watch list and one of 13 juniors to be recognized.

On January 21, 2019, Reese was named the MAAC Player of the Week. This was the first time that season a Canisius player has been recognized. In two games, he averaged 13 points, 8 assists, 6.5 rebounds, and 2.5 blocked shots.

In April 2019, Reese filed as an early entry candidate for the 2019 NBA Draft.

== Professional career ==
After going undrafted in the 2019 NBA Draft, Reese joined the Houston Rockets for the NBA Summer League. In the 2019 NBA G League Draft, Reese was picked in the First Round as the Sixth pick by the Austin Spurs.

=== Santa Cruz Warriors (2019–2021) ===
On January 12, 2021, the Santa Cruz Warriors announced their roster for the 2020-2021 NBA G League season that would take place at the ESPN Wide World of Sports Complex in Orlando, Florida and it consisted of four returning rights players including Reese.

In October 2021, the Santa Cruz Warriors traded the returning player rights of Reese to the College Park Skyhawks for the 30th overall pick Kalob Ledoux.

=== Guelph Nighthawks (2021) ===
In March 2021, Reese joined the Guelph Nighthawks after two seasons in the NBA G League. On June 10, 2021, the Guelph Nighthawks announced their training camp roster which consisted of Reese.

=== London Lions (2021–2022) ===
In July 2021, Reese signed with the London Lions and joined Kylor Kelley and Julian Washburn as other Americans on the team. At the end of the 2021–2022 season, Reese was named the British Basketball League First Team and Forward of the Year.

=== Parma Pari Perm (2022–2024) ===
On March 29, 2023, Reese was the MVP of the VTB United League after averaging 16.8 points, 8.4 rebounds, 7.2 assists and 2.4 steals. He even set his new season-high with 26 points.

In February 2024, Reese was part of the 2024 VTB United League All Star Game. He was a starter for Team Pascual alongside Jeremiah Martin, Anton Astapkovich, Jalen Reynolds and Octavius Ellis.

=== Yukatel Merkezefendi Belediyesi Basket Denizli (2024) ===
On July 23, 2024, Reese signed with Merkezefendi Belediyesi Denizli Basket for the 2024–2025 season.

=== ASP Promitheas Patras (2024–2025) ===
On November 29, 2024, Reese signed with Promitheas Patras B.C. after starting the season with Merkezefendi Belediyesi Denizli Basket. On June 10, 2025, following the 2024–2025 season, Reese was named to the Greek Basketball League Second Team alongside Nikola Milutinov, Hunter Hale, Jordon Varnado, and Juancho Hernangomez.

=== Hsinchu Toplus Lioneers (2025) ===
On August 20, 2025, Reese signed with the Hsinchu Toplus Lioneers of the Taiwan Professional Basketball League (TPBL). On November 24, the Hsinchu Toplus Lioneers terminated the contract relationship with Reese.

=== Uralmash Yekaterinburg (2025–2026) ===
On November 22, 2025, Reese signed with the Uralmash of the VTB United League.

== Personal life ==
Reese is the son of Kenneth Reese and Frances Eberhardt. He has two younger brothers.
