= Melissaratos =

Melissaratos is a surname. Notable people with the surname include:

- Aris Melissaratos (born 1943), American engineer and industrialist
- Petros Melissaratos (born 1993), Greek basketball player
