= Savannah Buccaneers =

- Leagues: The Basketball League
- Founded: 2022
- History: Coastal Georgia Buccaneers; 2023; 2024-present Savannah Buccaneers
- Arena: Tiger Arena
- Location: Savannah, Georgia
- Team colors
- General manager: Prescott Mack
- Ownership: Prescott Mack
- Website: Official website

The Savannah Buccaneers, formerly the Coastal Georgia Buccaneers, are an American basketball team based in Savannah, Georgia, and members in the minor professional The Basketball League (TBL).

== History ==
On August 31, 2022, Prescott Mack, team market owner of the Dallas Skyline announced a team would play in Darien, Georgia for the 2023 TBL season.

On April 24, after beginning the season in Darien, Georgia the team announced that it would move to Savannah, Georgia. The Buccaneers did not participate in the 2026 TBL season.
