= 2026 TBL season =

Basketball league season

- League: TBL
- Sport: Basketball

TBL seasons
- ← 2025 2027 →

The 2026 TBL season is the ninth season of The Basketball League (TBL).

== League changes ==
The Grove City Whitetails were announced as an expansion team. The Lehigh Valley Flight and Mesa Monsoons, teams which previously played in the Maximum Basketball League also joined the league for the 2026 season. In addition, to fill scheduling gaps the Mesquite Desert Dogs returned for 11 games and the Memphis Lions as well playing road games.

== Standings ==
=== Atlantic Canada ===
Pos	Team	Pld	W	L	PCT	GB
1	(New Brunswick) Tri City Tide	23	20	3	.870	—
2	(Newfoundland and Labrador) Newfoundland Rogues	25	15	10	.600	6
3	(Nova Scotia) Halifax Hoopers	20	7	13	.350	11.5
4	(New Brunswick) Port City Power	25	5	20	.200	16

Updated to match(es) played on 26 May 2026. Source:

=== Central ===
Pos	Team	Pld	W	L	PCT	GB
1	(Oklahoma) Potawatomi Fire	18	18	0	1.000	—
2	(Texas) ADS Sentinels	18	11	7	.611	7
3	(Arkansas) Little Rock Lightning	15	8	7	.533	8.5
4	(Oklahoma) Enid Outlaws	18	9	9	.500	9
5	(Oklahoma) Muskogee SkyKings	18	8	10	.444	10
6	(Texas) CYM Leopards	15	4	11	.267	12.5
7	(Texas) Dallas Stampede	18	1	17	.056	17

Updated to match(es) played on 26 May 2026. Source:

=== Mid Atlantic ===
Pos	Team	Pld	W	L	PCT	GB
1	(Virginia) DC Heat	19	14	5	.737	—
2	(Maryland) DMV Soldiers	22	15	7	.682	0.5
3	(Delaware) First State Misfits	19	12	7	.632	2
4	(Pennsylvania) Lehigh Valley Flight	8	3	5	.375	5.5
5	(New Jersey) Tri State Admirals	16	5	11	.313	7.5
6	(Massachusetts) New England Kraken	7	1	6	.143	7

Updated to match(es) played on 26 May 2026. Source:

=== Midwest ===
Pos	Team	Pld	W	L	PCT	GB
1	(Indiana) Lebanon Leprechauns	22	18	4	.818	—
2	(Missouri) St. Louis Griffins	16	13	3	.813	2
3	(Indiana) Kokomo BobKats	23	15	8	.652	3.5
4	(Ohio) Glass City Wranglers	19	11	8	.579	5.5
5	(Ohio) Columbus Wizards	19	9	10	.474	7.5
6	(Indiana) Hamilton County Huskers	18	6	12	.333	10
7	(Ohio) Groove City White Tails	22	5	17	.227	13
8	(Illinois) Lake County Legacy	9	1	8	.111	10.5

Updated to match(es) played on 26 May 2026. Source:

=== South Atlantic ===
Pos	Team	Pld	W	L	PCT	GB
1	(North Carolina) Raleigh Firebirds	18	14	4	.778	—
2	(Florida) Kissimmee Lambs	16	12	4	.750	1
3	(North Carolina) Fayetteville Liberty	20	11	9	.550	4
4	(Florida) Jacksonville 95ers	13	5	8	.385	6.5
5	(Florida) Tampa Bay Titans	14	4	10	.286	8

Updated to match(es) played on 26 May 2026. Source:

=== West ===
Pos	Team	Pld	W	L	PCT	GB
1	(North Dakota) 4 Bears Roar	24	23	1	.958	—
2	(Montana) Great Falls Electric	22	16	6	.727	6
3	(Washington (state)) Grant County Red Tails	20	12	8	.600	9
4	(Washington (state)) Tri City Sun Devils	15	3	12	.200	15.5
5	(Oregon) Willamette Valley Jaguars	18	2	16	.111	18

Updated to match(es) played on 26 May 2026. Source:

== Tournament bracket ==
=== Play Off Play Ins ===
May 23 – Mid Atlantic
DC Heat	101
DMV Solders	86

May 26 – South Atlantic
Kissimmee Lambs	126
Fayetteville Liberty	106

== Playoffs ==
First Round
4 Bears Roar	2
Willamette Valley Jaguars	0
West
Great Falls Electric	2
Grant County Red Tails	0
Tri City Tide	2
DC Heat	0
East
Raleigh Firebirds	2
Kissimmee Lambs	0
St. Louis Griffins	2
Glass City Wranglers	0
Midwest
Lebanon Leprechauns	2
Kokomo BobKats	1

Second round
Potawatomi Fire	2
ADS Sentinels	0
4 Bears Roar	2
Great Falls Electric	0
Tri City Tide	2
Raleigh Firebirds	1
St. Louis Griffins	2
Lebanon Leprechauns	1

Semifinals
Potawatomi Fire	2
4 Bears Roar	0
Tri City Tide	2
St. Louis Griffins	0

Finals
Potawatomi Fire	2
Tri City Tide	0
