= Salem Armory Auditorium =

Arena in Salem, Oregon, USA

Coordinates: 44°57′27.4″N 123°00′38.8″W

Salem Armory
- Interactive map of Salem Armory
- Address: 2320 17th St NE, Salem, Oregon
- Capacity: 3,887

Tenants
- Salem Stampede (IBL) (2006); Salem Capitals (USBL) (2022–present)

The Salem Armory Auditorium or Salem Armory (opened in the 1960s) is a multipurpose arena located in Salem, Oregon, United States. It is home to the Salem Capitals of USBL.

== Events ==
The venue has hosted concerts of bands such as Korn, Phish, the Red Hot Chili Peppers, Nirvana, and Pearl Jam.

In June 2021 it was announced that the expansion team the Salem Capitals will compete at the Armory for the 2022 season. Previously the arena hosted the Salem Stampede.
