= 94x50 League =

American basketball league

94x50
- Sport: Basketball
- Founded: 2026; 0 years ago
- Motto: Where The Game Lives
- No. of teams: 8
- Countries: United States
- Continent: North America
- Website: 94x50league.com

94x50 is an American professional men's basketball league that was founded in 2026.

94x50's regular season runs from March through June.

== History ==
In the summer of 2025, owners of thirteen teams from The Basketball League (TBL) met in Las Vegas, deciding to leave TBL and revive the United States Basketball League (USBL). They criticized TBL as a pyramid scheme, with league owner Dave Magley having too much power over the individual teams.

Eight teams originally slated to be part of the USBL revival announced on February 6, 2026 that they would instead form a separate league to be named in a contest. In March 2026, the winning entry was announced as 94x50, named for the dimensions of a basketball court.

== Teams ==
Base locations of USA teams in the league. Colors represent conference alignment as of the 2027 season.

=== Current teams ===
The 94x50 teams
Conference	Team	City	Venue	Capacity	Founded	First season	Head coach
Eastern Conference
Eastern Conference	Baltimore Rhythm	Baltimore, Maryland	Goucher College; Harford Community College	1,200; 2,500	2025	2026	Samir St. Clair
Eastern Conference	Capital Seahawks	Bowie, Maryland	Bowie State University	2,200	2024	2026	Jasper Williams
Eastern Conference	Frederick Flying Cows	Frederick, Maryland	Woodsboro Bank Arena	1,600	2023	2026	Dan Prete
Eastern Conference	Jersey Shore Breaks	Belmar, New Jersey	St. Rose High School	TBA	2024	2026	Randy Holmes
Eastern Conference	New York Phoenix	Schenectady, New York	M&T Bank Center	1,800	2024	2026	Trevis Wyche
Eastern Conference	Reading Rebels	Reading, Pennsylvania	Alvernia University	1,200	2021	2026	Joe Linderman
Eastern Conference	Virginia Valley Vipers	Purcellville, Virginia	Patrick Henry College	1,200	2022	2026	Ed Corporal
Western Conference	Lilac City Legends	Spokane, Washington	Numerica Veterans Arena	12,500	2020	2027	Stanley Ibia
Western Conference	San Diego Sharks	San Diego, California	Canyon Crest Academy	2,900	2022	2026	Brandon Cheeks
Western Conference	Vancouver Bears	Vancouver, Washington	Hudson's Bay High School	4,400	2005	2027	Curtis Hill and Calvin Hampton
