= Woodsboro Bank Arena =

Sports venue in Frederick, Maryland

- Location within Maryland Location within the United States
- Interactive map of Woodsboro Bank Arena
- Former names: BB&T Arena (2011–2024)
- Address: 601 Blazer Trail; Frederick, MD 21701
- Coordinates: 39°25′27.0″N 77°24′59.5″W
- Owner: Hood College
- Capacity: 1,600
- Current use: Basketball, volleyball

Construction
- Opened: November 2011
- Architect: Zavos Architecture + Design
- Builder: Warner Construction

Tenants
- Hood Blazers men's basketball (MAC) 2011–present; Hood Blazers women's basketball (MAC) 2011–present; Hood Blazers volleyball (MAC) 2011–present; Frederick Flying Cows (94x50) 2024–present

Woodsboro Bank Arena is a sports venue in Frederick, Maryland on the campus of Hood College. It is home to Hood's volleyball and women's and men's basketball teams, and to the Frederick Flying Cows of 94x50 League. A part of the Ronald J. Volpe Athletic Center, the arena was completed in November 2011 by local firms Warner Construction and Zavos Architecture + Design. The arena has 1,600-seats, with space for 500 additional floor-level seats.

The arena was originally named BB&T Arena from its 2011 opening. In April 2024, Hood College reached a five-year naming rights agreement with Woodsboro Bank to rename the facility Woodsboro Bank Arena.
