= Miami Christian School =

Location
- 200 MCS Victors Way (Formerly NW 109th Ave.); Fontainebleau, Florida (Miami address) 33172; United States
- Coordinates: 25.771221°N 80.373364°W

Information
- Type: Private
- Established: 1954
- Principal: Lorena Morrison
- Grades: PreK-12
- Colors: Red, white & black
- Athletics: FHSAA 2A
- Team name: Victors
- Accreditation: ACSI; NCPSA
- Website: www.miamichristian.org

Miami Christian School is a private Christian school in Fontainebleau, Florida, United States. The school has a Miami address. It was established in 1954. The school is accredited by the Association of Christian Schools International and the National Council for Private School Accreditation.

== Athletics ==
It has won a number of Florida High School Athletic Association (FHSAA) state championships in its history. The boys basketball program won two Class 1A state championships in 2000, 2002, and three Class 2A state championships in 2015, 2017, and 2018. The school was banned from participating in the 2001 and 2003 Class 1A boys basketball state playoffs by the FHSAA. The girls basketball program won two class 2A state championships in 2021 and 2022. The baseball team has won four state championships in 1975, 2018, 2019, and 2022.

== Notable alumni ==
- Frank Jimenez (1982), 21st General Counsel of the U.S. Department of the Navy.
- David Rivera (1983), former member of the Florida House of Representatives and the U.S. House of Representatives.
- J. J. Barea (2002), professional basketball player, 2011 NBA Champion
- Guillermo Diaz (2003), basketball player who plays professionally in Puerto Rico
- Isaiah Reese (2015), professional basketball player
- Alejandro Rosario (2020), professional baseball player
