= Ed Listopad =

American football player (born 1929)

No. 66
- Position: Guard

Personal information
- Born: August 28, 1929 (age 97); Baltimore, Maryland, U.S.
- Listed height: 6 ft 1 in (1.85 m)
- Listed weight: 230 lb (104 kg)

Career information
- High school: Patterson (Baltimore)
- College: Wake Forest
- NFL draft: 1952: 19th round, 219th overall pick

Career history
- Chicago Cardinals (1952)

Awards and highlights
- Second-team All-SoCon (1950)

Career NFL statistics
- Games played: 4
- Games started: 4
- Fumble recoveries: 1
- Stats at Pro Football Reference

Edward George Listopad (born August 28, 1929) is an American former professional football player who was a guard for the Chicago Cardinals of the National Football League (NFL). He played college football for the Wake Forest Demon Deacons, having previously attended Patterson High School in Baltimore.
