= Larry Surock =

American soccer player

Personal information
- Full name: Lawrence Carmen Surock
- Date of birth: November 9, 1930
- Place of birth: Baltimore, Maryland, United States
- Date of death: September 26, 2007 (aged 76)
- Place of death: Baltimore, Maryland, United States
- Height: 6 ft 1 in (1.85 m)
- Position: Forward

College career
Years	Team	Apps	(Gls)
1952–1953	University of Baltimore		

Senior career*
Years	Team	Apps	(Gls)
1954–1957	Baltimore Rockets		
1958–	Pompei S.C.		

International career
1952	United States	1	(0)
- * Club domestic league appearances and goals

Lawrence Carmen Surock (November 9, 1930 – September 26, 2007) was an American soccer player who was a member of the United States 1952 Olympic Soccer Team.

Surock graduated from Patterson High School where he was a four-time All Metro soccer player. In 1949, he was a member of the New York Giants baseball farm team in 1949. Surock attended the University of Baltimore where he was a 1952 All American. That year, he was called into the U.S. Olympic team for the 1952 Helsinki Olympics. In 1954, Surock turned professional with the Baltimore Rockets of the American Soccer League. He continued to attend night school to complete his degree and also served in the Korean War. In 1957, the Rockets were renamed Baltimore Pompeii. In 1958, Pompeii lost in overtime to the Los Angeles Kickers in the championship game of the 1958 National Challenge Cup. In 1960, Pompeii withdrew from the ASL and continued as an amateur club.

In 1991, Surock was inducted into the Maryland Soccer Hall of Fame. In 2004, he was made a member of the University of Baltimore Athletic Hall of Fame.
