= Aquille Carr =

American basketball player (born 1993)

No. 3 – Reading Rebels
- Position: Point guard
- League: TBL

Personal information
- Born: September 28, 1993 (age 33) Baltimore, Maryland, U.S.
- Listed height: 5 ft 7 in (1.70 m)
- Listed weight: 145 lb (66 kg)

Career information
- High school: Patterson (Baltimore, Maryland); Princeton Day Academy (Lanham, Maryland)
- NBA draft: 2014: undrafted
- Playing career: 2013–present

Career history
- 2013–2014: Delaware 87ers
- 2014: Saint John Mill Rats
- 2016: Baltimore Hawks
- 2016–2017: Beltway Bombers
- 2017–2018: Girne Universitesi SK
- 2018–2019; 2021–2022: Baltimore Hawks
- 2022–2024: Reading Rebels
- 2025: Capital Seahawks
- 2025–present: Reading Rebels

Career highlights
- ABA All-Star (2022)

Aquille Carr (born September 28, 1993) is an American professional basketball player for the Reading Rebels of The Basketball League (TBL). He attended Princeton Day Academy in Lanham, Maryland, and was a highly scouted prospect for the 2013 college recruiting class. In January 2012, Carr announced his commitment to the Seton Hall University Pirates men's basketball team for the 2013–14 season. In March 2013, he instead announced that he was skipping college to play overseas, but ultimately stayed in the United States to play with the Delaware 87ers of the NBA Development League. Carr declared for the 2014 NBA draft, but was not selected.

Carr has had two stints in the ABA with the Baltimore Hawks, and has also played in Canada and Cyprus.

== High school career ==
A native of Baltimore, Carr is known for his small stature, athleticism, and ball-handling abilities. The Washington Post noted that he's "somewhat generously listed at 5 feet 7, in sneakers, including his hair." As a freshman, he led his Patterson High School team to a 76–62 upset victory over No. 5 Digital Harbor with 20 points, 10 assists, and six steals. For the feat, The Baltimore Sun named him its Boys Athlete of the Week on December 23, 2009. The following week, Carr received the honor again after he scored 15 of his 38 points in the fourth quarter against defending Class 2A state champions, Baltimore City College. Filling in as the starting point guard, he helped Patterson defeat Josh Selby-led Lake Clifton with 39 points and 19 assists. In his freshman season, he averaged 25.5 points, 8.0 assists and 5.3 steals.

During his sophomore season, he scored 57 points against Forest Park to win the Big Miller Christmas Classic, 103–71. In that game, he scored seven three-pointers and surpassed his school's single-game scoring record that had stood for 50 years. Carr led his team to a school-best 25–2 record and the Class 4A state championship game, where they incurred their second loss. On the season, he averaged 31.3 points, 5.6 assists, and 4.5 steals. In his first two years at Patterson, he tallied more than 1,000 points. On April 6, 2011, ESPN named Carr the High School Player of the Week.

During his junior year, he led the Patterson High Clippers to the Maryland 3A state championship. He scored 28 points and had eight assists in the championship game.

He developed a significant following in his hometown of Baltimore. The Sun characterized him as a "must-see phenomenon". Patterson relocated from its small gymnasium to the arena on the Morgan State University campus eight times during the season to hold the large crowds drawn to attend his games. He received numerous nicknames, the most notable being "The Crime Stopper", for his alleged effect on the city's crime rate. His high school coach, Harry Martin said, "The crime in East Baltimore probably goes down during our games."

In April 2011, Carr played on the U.S. junior team in the Junior International Tournament in Milan, Italy. He led the team to capture the gold medal and averaged 40.0 points per game. After scoring 45 points in one game, Italian fans carried him from the court. Shortly after the tournament, the Italian professional basketball club Lottomatica Roma reportedly offered Carr, a high school sophomore at the time, a $750,000 contract. It was the largest contract ever offered by a European club to a high school player before graduation. According to his coach, Carr planned to finish his high school career at Patterson; however, there was some speculation that he would be unable to play his senior year at a Baltimore Public School due to his turning 19 years old before the start of the season. Carr eventually transferred to a series of prep schools.

In June 2011, ESPN gave Carr a grade of 92 and ranked him the No. 9 point guard and No. 50 overall player in the 2013 college recruiting class. Rivals.com ranked him the No. 53 overall player in his class. Carr played with the Under Armour-sponsored Baltimore Elite Amateur Athletic Union team. Carr reported that he had received about 28 scholarship offers before the end of his sophomore year.

== Professional career ==
=== Delaware 87ers (2013–2014) ===
On November 1, 2013, Carr was drafted by the Delaware 87ers in the third round of the 2013 NBA Development League Draft. On November 23, 2013, in his debut game, Carr recorded 15 points and 2 assists in a 106–117 loss to the Canton Charge. On January 3, 2014, he was released by the 87ers per his request, citing his displeasure with the lack of playing time.

=== Saint John Mill Rats (2014) ===
On April 20, 2014, Carr announced his intentions to enter the 2014 NBA draft but subsequently went undrafted.

On September 9, 2014, Carr signed a one-year deal with the Saint John Mill Rats of the Canadian National Basketball League. However, his troubled career continued, as he was suspended twice during the season and often took his anger and frustration out during games. On December 13, 2014, he was released by the Mill Rats after appearing in nine games and averaging 12.9 points and 3.4 assists per game.

=== Baltimore Hawks (2016) ===
In January 2016, Carr signed with the Baltimore Hawks of the American Basketball Association.

=== Beltway Bombers (2016–2017) ===
Carr played for the Beltway Bombers in the APBL during the 2016–17 season.

=== Girne Universitesi SK (2017–2018) ===
In November 2017, Carr signed with Girne Universitesi SK of the Cypriot North League.

=== Return to Baltimore (2018–2019; 2021–2022) ===
Carr returned to the Baltimore Hawks for the 2018–19 season. He had a 65-point game in February 2019. Carr returned to the Hawks for the 2021–22 season.

=== Reading Rebels and Capital Seahawks (2022–present) ===
In April 2022, Carr joined the Reading Rebels of the TBL. He continued with the Rebels in 2023 and 2024.

For the 2025 TBL season, Carr joined the Capital Seahawks. After 11 games for the Seahawks, he returned to the Reading Rebels in May 2025, where he played two games.

== Player profile ==
Some analysts questioned if his game would translate to the collegiate or professional level because of his bantam stature. However, he reportedly measures a 48-inch vertical leap, has excellent ball-handling skills, which allow him to create space for his shot, and the athleticism to dunk despite his height. CBS Sports called him "one of the most explosive scorers in the country". Sports Illustrated wrote, "He has explosive speed, electric ball-handling skills and court vision that could rival Steve Nash's." ESPN wrote that he is "one of the quickest and [most] explosive players in the country, regardless of class", but noted his inconsistent jump shot and turnovers were areas for improvement. The Baltimore Sun likened the criticisms to "complaining about the floor mats on a Ferrari".

== Career statistics ==
Legend
GP	Games played	GS	Games started	MPG	Minutes per game
FG%	Field goal percentage	3P%	3-point field goal percentage	FT%	Free throw percentage
RPG	Rebounds per game	APG	Assists per game	SPG	Steals per game
BPG	Blocks per game	PPG	Points per game	**Bold**	Career high

=== NBA D-League ===
Year	Team	GP	GS	MPG	FG%	3P%	FT%	RPG	APG	SPG	BPG	PPG
2013–14	Delaware	10	0	14.0	.398	.391	.683	.9	1.9	1.2	.0	10.7
Career		10	0	14.0	.398	.391	.683	.9	1.9	1.2	.0	10.7

== Personal life ==
In August 2012, Carr was arrested on charges of assault and reckless endangerment.

In September 2022, Carr was involved in a hit-and-run with a cyclist.
