= Salem Capitals =

- Division: Pacific
- League: USBL 2026–present TBL 2022–2025
- Founded: 2020
- History: Salem Capitals; 2022–present
- Arena: Salem Armory
- Location: Salem, Oregon
- Team colors
- Head coach: Nick Cortese
- Ownership: Jason Conrad
- Website: Official website
Home	Away

The Salem Capitals are an American professional basketball team based in Salem, Oregon, and a member of United States Basketball League (USBL). They play their home games in the Salem Armory, which seats 3,000 for basketball.

== History ==
On December 6, 2020, Evelyn Magley, CEO of The Basketball League (TBL), stated that Salem, Oregon, was approved as a basketball franchise with Jason Conrad the inaugural team owner. The Capitals opted to sit out the 2021 season due to the COVID-19 pandemic. Their motto is "community culture" and the team actively focuses on and participates in community engagement projects and outings.

On November 6, 2025, Conrad announced that the Capitals will be joining the relaunched USBL for the 2026 season.

Season History
League	Year	Head Coach	Regular season record	Regular season finish	Playoff Record	Playoff Finish
TBL	2022	Brian Stevens	17-7	3rd - TBL West	3-2	West Semi-Finals
TBL	2023	Kevin Johnson Jr.	15-10	3rd - TBL West	2-2	West Semi-Finals
TBL	2024	Kevin Johnson Jr.	14-10	3rd - TBL Pacific Northwest	0-1	Pacific Northwest Semi-Finals
TBL	2025	Kevin Johnson Jr.	11-13	4th - TBL Pacific Northwest	N/A	N/A
	Totals		57-40 (.588)		5-5 (.500)	

=== Current roster ===
Note: Flags indicate national team eligibility at FIBA-sanctioned events. Players may hold other non-FIBA nationalities not displayed.

Salem Capitals roster
Players	Coaches
Pos. / No. / Nat. / Name / Ht. / Wt. / Age	Head coach: (United States) Tony Searcy; Assistant coach(es): (United States) Beau Rinker; Legend: (C) Team captain; Injured; Roster

== 2025 Season ==
The Capitals had an up and down 2025 season. Their season was highlighted by the signing of Robert Upshaw. However, they were never able to find their groove and missed the postseason for the first time in franchise history. But, their community presence grew to new heights as they averaged about 1,100 fans per home game.

=== Player Awards ===
- Isaiah Gentry - All West Conference First Team, Averaged 19.9 points and 4.5 assists per game.

2025 Roster
Name	GP	Season with Capitals
Moe Smith	24	3
Preston Whitfield	24	3
Davonte Cleveland	24	4
Cameron Benzel	24	1
Isaiah Gentry	23	3
Carlos Angel Jr	22	1
Tyreek Price	21	3
Jack Boydell	21	1
Dominique Lawrence	21	4
Jason Conrad	14	3
Jameel Tolbert	9	2
Robert Upshaw	9	1
Jordan Lind	7	1
Taylor Webster	6	2
Valentine Nyakinda	2	2

2025 Coaches
Name	Role
Kevin Johnson Jr	Head Coach
Beau Rinker	Assistant Coach
Taylor Kelly	Assistant Coach

== 2024 Season ==
The Capitals began the season 0-2 before winning 6 straight and finishing the month of April with a record of 8-6. On April 28th during the third quarter of a home game against the Wenatchee Bighorns, Jason Conrad collapsed on the sideline. Fans were evacuated and the game was postponed to be finished at a later date. Conrad quickly made a full recovery. Due to Pacific Northwest conference teams playing a varying amount of regular season games, playoff standings were to be decided by win percentage. The top two playoff seeds were the Vancouver Volcanoes (16-4) and the Seattle Super Hawks (16-8). The Capitals went on to finish the regular season with a record of with a regular season record of 13-10 (.565 win percentage) while the Bighorns finished 10-9 (.526 win percentage). Due to the closeness of their respective win percentages, it was decided that the Capitals and Bighorns resume the unfinished game in Seattle on May 28th, with the winner playing the Super Hawks in the first round of the playoffs later that night. In unprecedented fashion, the game was resumed with 5:26 left in the third quarter with a score of Capitals 76, Bighorns 66. The Capitals went on to win the game 111-106, moving their record to 14-10. Despite a valiant effort and long day of basketball, they subsequently lost to the Super Hawks 130-127 later that night, ending their season.

=== Player Awards ===
- Joseph (Allen) Billinger Jr - All West Conference Second Team, TBL National Player of the Week #5, AB3 MVP Award*, Averaged 18.5 points and 5 assists per game.
- Preston Whitfield - All West Conference Second Team, Swaggy P Offensive Player of the Year Award*, Averaged 22.5 points per game and 43.9% from three point range.
- Kylor Kelley - All Defensive First Team, K-P Defensive Player of the Year Award*, Averages 3.9 blocks and .9 steals per game.
- Psalm Maduakor - K-P Defensive Player of the Year Award*
- Jameel Tolbert - Meel Work Most Improved Player Award*
- Taylor Webster - T Webb Teammate of the Year Award*
- Dominique Lawrence - DOMO Community Award*
- *Denotes Team Voted

=== Coach Awards ===
- Kevin Johnson Jr. - Best Dressed Coach of the Week #4

2024 Roster
Name	GP	Season with Capitals
Tyreek Price	24	2
Allen Billinger Jr	24	3
Dominique Lawrence	24	3
Davonte Cleveland	24	3
Jameel Tolbert	24	2
Paul Hafford	23	3
Preston Whitfield	23	2
Psalm Maduakor	23	2
Moe Smith	19	2
Valentine Nyakinda	19	1
Kylor Kelley	14	1
Taylor Webster	10	1
Isaiah Gentry	7	2

2024 Coaches
Name	Role
Kevin Johnson Jr	Head Coach
Beau Rinker	Assistant Coach

== 2023 Season ==
The Capitals began the season 5-7 before winning 10 of the 13 remaining regular season games, finishing with a regular season record of 15-10, good for second place in the Northwest division (within the West conference). They won a thrilling first round playoff game over the Vancouver Volcanoes 117-114 before falling to the Seattle Super Hawks during the West Conference Semi-Finals in a best two out of three series.

=== Player Awards ===
- Joseph (Allen) Billinger Jr - TBL All-Star, All West Conference First Team, Averaged 20.2 points and 4.8 assists per game.
- Preston Whitfield - All West Conference Third Team, Averaged 19.1 points per game and 43.6% from three point range.

2023 Roster
Name	GP	Season with Capitals
Tyreek Price	29	1
Allen Billinger Jr	29	2
Preston Whitfield	29	1
Isaiah Gentry	28	1
Moe Smith	27	1
Dominique Lawrence	26	2
Psalm Maduakor	26	1
Paul Hafford	24	2
Jameel Tolbert	23	1
Davonte Cleveland	21	2
Scott Clough	16	2
Jason Conrad	9	2
Kylor Kelley	9	1
Tyler West Jr	7	2
Jason Smarr	5	2

2023 Coaches
Name	Role
Kevin Johnson Jr	Head Coach
Jason Smarr	Assistant Coach

== 2022 Season ==
On March 4, 2022, the team's inaugural season began with a 116-100 win over the Vancouver Volcanoes. They went on to win their next seven consecutive games before a 127-125 loss to the California Sea-Kings on April 1. They finished the regular-season with a record of 17-7, good for third place in the West Conference. They swept the Vancouver Volcanoes in the First Round of the playoffs and then fell to the California Sea-Kings during the West Conference Semi-Finals in a best two out of three series.

=== Player Awards ===
- Montigo Alford - All West Conference Second Team, Averaged 19.8 points and 4.4 assists per game.
- Vincent Bowman - TBL All-Star, All West Conference First Team, Averaged 24.4 points and 10.8 rebounds per game.
- Dominique Lawrence - TBL "Spirit of the Game Award" winner for his commitment to the fans and the community.

=== Coach Awards ===
- Brian Stevens - TBL Coach of the Month (March), team record of 8-0

2022 Roster
Name	GP	Season with Capitals
Kevin Johnson Jr	28	1
Dominique Lawrence	28	1
Tyler West Jr	26	1
Vincent Boumann	26	1
Montigo Alford	26	1
Allen Billinger Jr	26	1
Paul Hafford	25	1
Jason Smarr	22	1
Malik Morgan	14	1
Eric Petty Jr	14	1
Scott Clough	13	1
Jahlin Smith	12	1
Davonte Cleveland	3	1
Jason Conrad	2	1
Jamal Logan	2	1
Darius Marrow	2	1

2022 Coaches
Name	Role
Brian Stevens	Head Coach
Cody Brock	Assistant Coach
Mary Stade	Assistant Coach

== Records and Statistics (Through 2025) ==
Scoring: Single Game
Rank	Name	Points	Opponent	Date
1	Allen Billinger Jr	42	Seattle Super Hawks	5/28/2023
T2	Vincent Boumann	41	California Sea-Kings	4/1/2022
T2	Montigo Alford	41	Bakersfield Magic	4/2/2022
T2	Allen Billinger Jr	41	Newfoundland Rogues	2/22/2023
5	Vincent Boumann	37	Bakersfield Magic	5/22/2022
T6	Preston Whitfield	35	Emerald City Jaguars	4/20/2024
T6	Allen Billinger Jr	35	Vancouver Volcanoes	4/7/2024
T8	Vincent Boumann	34	Vancouver Volcanoes	5/20/2022
T8	Vincent Boumann	34	Vancouver Volcanoes	4/22/2022
T8	Isaiah Gentry	34	Vancouver Volcanoes	5/20/2023

Playoff Scoring: Single Game
Rank	Name	Points	Opponent	Date
1	Vincent Boumann	46	California Sea-Kings	6/8/2022
2	Preston Whitfield	40	Seattle Super Hawks	5/28/2024
3	Preston Whitfield	38	Vancouver Volcanoes	5/30/2023
4	Davonte Cleveland	32	Seattle Super Hawks	5/28/2024
5	Isaiah Gentry	31	Seattle Super Hawks	6/1/2023

Assisted Baskets: Single Game
Rank	Name	Assists	Opponent	Date
T1	Allen Billinger Jr	11	San Diego Sharks	3/18/2023
T1	Isaiah Gentry	11	Wenatchee Bighorns	4/11/2025
T2	Tyler West Jr	10	Bakersfield Magic	5/22/2022
T2	Allen Billinger Jr	10	Vancouver Volcanoes	4/7/2024
T5	Tyler West Jr	9	California Sea-Kings	3/26/2022
T5	Isaiah Gentry	9	Newfoundland Rogues	2/22/2023
T5	Isaiah Gentry	9	Wenatchee Bighorns	5/12/2023
T5	Davonte Cleveland	9	Wenatchee Bighorns	5/18/2025
T5	Isaiah Gentry	9	Wenatchee Bighorns	5/15/2025
T5	Allen Billinger Jr	9	Great Fall Electric	5/3/2024
T5	Allen Billinger Jr	9	Emerald City Jaguars	5/23/2024

Playoff Assisted Baskets: Single Game
Rank	Name	Assists	Opponent	Date
1	Montigo Alford	9	Vancouver Volcanoes	6/4/2022
T2	Isaiah Gentry	7	Vancouver Volcanoes	5/30/2023
T2	Allen Billinger Jr	7	Seattle Super Hawks	6/1/2023
T4	Vincent Boumann	6	Vancouver Volcanoes	6/4/2022
T4	Montigo Alford	6	California Sea-Kings	6/8/2022

Rebounds: Single Game
Rank	Name	Rebounds	Opponent	Date
1	Vincent Boumann	20	California Sea-Kings	4/1/2022
T2	Kevin Johnson Jr	19	SoCal Moguls	3/13/2022
T2	Vincent Boumann	19	Vancouver Volcanoes	4/9/2022
T4	Kylor Kelley	18	Vancouver Volcanoes	5/5/2023
T4	Kevin Johnson Jr	18	Bakersfield Magic	3/18/2022
T6	Kevin Johnson Jr	17	SoCal Moguls	5/7/2022
T6	Cameron Benzel	17	Wenatchee Bighorns	5/15/2025
T8	Vincent Boumann	16	Bakersfield Magic	5/22/2022
T8	Kylor Kelley	16	Great Falls Electric	5/4/2024
T8	Kylor Kelley	16	Seattle Super Hawks	4/2/2023
T8	Kevin Johnson Jr	16	Vancouver Volcanoes	3/5/2022
T8	Kevin Johnson Jr	16	Vancouver Volcanoes	5/27/2022
T8	Preston Whitfield	16	Seattle Super Hawks	5/9/2025

Playoff Rebounds: Single Game
Rank	Name	Rebounds	Opponent	Date
1	Kevin Johnson Jr	16	Vancouver Volcanoes	6/3/2022
2	Vincent Boumann	15	Vancouver Volcanoes	6/3/2022
3	Vincent Boumann	13	California-Sea Kings	6/8/2022
4	Kevin Johnson Jr	12	California-Sea Kings	6/8/2022
5	Moe Smith	10	Seattle Super Hawks	6/4/2023

Blocked Shots: Single Game
Rank	Name	Blocks	Opponent	Date
1	Kylor Kelley	9	Emerald City Jaguars	4/18/2024
T2	Kylor Kelley	8	Vancouver Volcanoes	5/5/2023
T2	Kylor Kelley	8	Wenatchee Bighorns	5/12/2023
T2	Kylor Kelley	8	Emerald City Jaguars	5/10/2024
T5	Kylor Kelley	6	Vancouver Volcanoes	5/24/2024
T5	Cameron Benzel	6	Vancouver Volcanoes	5/24/2025
T5	Kylor Kelley	6	Seattle Super Hawks	5/12/2024
T5	Kylor Kelley	6	Vancouver Volcanoes	4/1/2023
T9	Kylor Kelley	5	Vancouver Volcanoes	5/14/2023
T9	Kylor Kelley	5	Wenatchee Bighorns	4/21/2023
T9	Kylor Kelley	5	Vancouver Volcanoes	4/14/2023

Playoff Blocked Shots: Single Game
Rank	Name	Blocks	Opponent	Date
1	Jahlin Smith	6	California-Sea Kings	6/8/2022
2	Jahlin Smith	3	Seattle Super Hawks	6/4/2022
T3	Dominique Lawrence	2	California-Sea Kings	6/8/2022
T3	Dominique Lawrence	2	Vancouver Volcanoes	5/30/2023
T3	Dominique Lawrence	2	Seattle Super Hawks	6/1/2023
T3	Psalm Maduakor	2	Seattle Super Hawks	6/6/2023
T3	Tyreek Price	2	Vancouver Volcanoes	5/30/2023

Steals: Single Game
Rank	Name	Steals	Opponent	Date
1	Montigo Alford	6	California-Sea Kings	4/23/2022
T2	Preston Whitfield	5	Great Falls Electric	5/4/2024
T2	Preston Whitfield	5	Emerald City Jaguars	5/10/2024
T2	Isaiah Gentry	5	Seattle Super Hawks	4/2/2023
T5	Preston Whitfield	4	West Coast Breeze	4/28/2023
T5	Preston Whitfield	4	Emerald City Jaguars	4/20/2024
T5	Kevin Johnson Jr	4	Vancouver Volcanoes	5/20/2022
T5	Isaiah Gentry	4	Wenatchee Bighorns	5/19/2023
T5	Isaiah Gentry	4	Wenatchee Bighorns	4/30/2023
T5	Dominique Lawrence	4	Newfoundland Rogues	3/10/2023
T5	Davonte Cleveland	4	Emerald City Jaguars	5/23/2024
T5	Allen Billinger Jr	4	Emerald City Jaguars	5/10/2024
T5	Preston Whitfield	4	Vancouver Volcanoes	3/1/2025
T5	Preston Whitfield	4	Willamette Valley Jaguars	3/15/2025
T5	Preston Whitfield	4	Great Falls Electric	3/23/2025
T5	Isaiah Gentry	4	Wenatchee Bighorns	4/17/2025

Playoff Steals: Single Game
Rank	Name	Steals	Opponent	Date
1	Jahlin Smith	5	Vancouver Volcanoes	6/3/2022
T2	Tyler West Jr	4	Vancouver Volcanoes	6/4/2022
T2	Preston Whitfield	4	Vancouver Volcanoes	5/30/2023
T2	Jahlin Smith	4	Vancouver Volcanoes	6/4/2022
T5	Paul Hafford	3	Vancouver Volcanoes	6/3/2022
T5	Montigo Alford	3	Vancouver Volcanoes	6/4/2022
T5	Dominique Lawrence	3	Seattle Super Hawks	6/4/2023
T5	Davonte Cleveland	3	Seattle Super Hawks	6/4/2023
T5	Davonte Cleveland	3	Seattle Super Hawks	5/28/2024

Three Pointers Made: Single Game
Rank	Name	3PM	Opponent	Date
T1	Paul Hafford	7	Wenatchee Bighorns	4/30/2023
T1	Allen Billinger Jr	7	Seattle Super Hawks	5/28/2023
T1	Tyreek Price	7	Seattle Super Hawks	4/12/2025
T4	Tyreek Price	6	Vancouver Volcanoes	4/14/2023
T4	Preston Whitfield	6	Emerald City Jaguars	4/20/2024
T4	Paul Hafford	6	Emerald City Jaguars	4/18/2024
T4	Paul Hafford	6	California-Sea Kings	3/26/2022
T4	Paul Hafford	6	Great Falls Electric	3/16/2024
T4	Allen Billinger Jr	6	Vancouver Volcanoes	3/10/2024
T4	Isaiah Gentry	6	Great Falls Electric	3/22/2025
T4	Jason Smarr	6	California-Sea Kings	3/26/2022
T4	Tyreek Price	6	Wenatchee Bighorns	4/11/2025
T4	Jack Boydell	6	Willamette Valley Jaguars	5/16/2025

Playoff Three Pointers Made: Single Game
Rank	Name	3PM	Opponent	Date
1	Isaiah Gentry	5	Seattle Super Hawks	6/1/2023
T2	Paul Hafford	4	Seattle Super Hawks	6/4/2023
T2	Paul Hafford	4	Vancouver Volcanoes	6/3/2022
T2	Isaiah Gentry	4	Vancouver Volcanoes	5/30/2023
T2	Allen Billinger Jr	4	Vancouver Volcanoes	5/30/2023

Double Doubles (Total)
Rank	Name	Amount
1	Vincent Boumann	12
T2	Kylor Kelley	11
T2	Cameron Benzel	11
4	Kevin Johnson Jr	9
5	Isaiah Gentry	7
6	Moe Smith	6
7	Psalm Maduakor	4
8	Preston Whitfield	3
T9	Allen Billinger Jr	2
T9	Dominique Lawrence	2
T9	Robert Upshaw	2
T12	Paul Hafford	1
T12	Valentine Nyakinda	1
T12	Tyler West Jr	1
T12	Jameel Tolbert	1

Playoff Double Doubles
Rank	Name	Amount
1	Vincent Boumann	2
T2	Kevin Johnson Jr	1
T2	Moe Smith	1

Triple Doubles
Rank	Name	Amount
T1	Tyler West Jr	1
T1	Isaiah Gentry	1

Head To Head Records
Opponent	Regular season record	Playoff Record	Win percentage (Playoffs)
Vancouver Volcanoes	18-9	3-0	.667 (1.000)
Seattle Super Hawks	6-10	1-3	.375 (.250)
Wenatchee Bighorns	9-5		.643
Willamette Valley Jaguars	10-1		.909
Great Falls Electric	3-6		.333
Bakersfield Majestics	4-1		.800
California Sea-Kings	1-3	1-2	.250 (.333)
Newfoundland Rogues	1-3		.250
San Diego Sharks	2-1		.666
SoCal Moguls	1-1		.500
LA Flash	1-0		1.000
West Coast Breeze	1-0		1.000
Totals	57-40	5-5	.588 (.500)

== Notable players ==
- Kylor Kelley
- Robert Upshaw
