= United States Basketball League (2026) =

American basketball league

- Sport: Basketball
- Founded: 2025; 1 year ago
- CEO: David Otto
- President: Ingrid Hutt
- Commissioner: Dennis Truax
- Motto: The League of Opportunity
- No. of teams: 5
- Countries: United States
- Continent: North America
- Website: usbl.com

The United States Basketball League (USBL) is a professional men's basketball league.

The league's name and trademarks are licensed from the defunct United States Basketball League (1985–2008).

USBL's regular season runs from March through May.

== History ==
In the summer of 2025, owners of thirteen teams from The Basketball League (TBL) met in Las Vegas, deciding to leave TBL and revive the United States Basketball League (USBL). They criticized TBL as a pyramid scheme, with league owner Dave Magley having too much power over the individual teams.

Executives appointed in 2025 included San Diego Surf owner David Otto as chief executive officer, former Las Vegas Stars owner Ingrid Hutt as league president, and former CBA/PBL/USBL figurehead Dennis Truax as league commissioner.

Eight teams originally announced to be part of the USBL revival revealed on February 6, 2026 that they would instead form 94x50 League.

The league announced in March 2026 that Jontay Porter would resume his professional career as a member of the Seattle Super Hawks after receiving a lifetime ban from the NBA for gambling.

The following season, two teams left for the 94x50 League and one team (Wenatchee Bighorns) announced they would join in 2027.

== Teams ==
Base locations of USA teams in the league. Colors represent divisional alignment as of the 2026 season.

=== Current teams ===
The USBL teams
Team	City	Venue	Capacity	Founded	First season	Head coach
Salem Capitals	Salem, Oregon	Salem Armory Auditorium	3,200	2020	2026	Nick Cortese
Seattle Super Hawks	Seattle, Washington	Seattle Pacific University	3,300	2022	2026	Robert Pack
Yakima Heat	Yakima, Washington	Yakima Valley College	1,500	2022	2026	
San Diego Surf	San Diego, California	MiraCosta College		2006	2026	Jeff Harper-Harris

== Future teams ==
Future USBL teams
Team	City	Arena	Capacity	Founded	Joined	Head coach
Wenatchee Bighorns	Wenatchee, Washington	Wenatchee Valley College	800	2022	2027	Matt Riley
