= Jordan Williams (basketball, born 1995) =

British basketball player (born 1995)

No. 4 – London Lions
- Position: Power forward
- League: Super League Basketball

Personal information
- Born: 16 October 1995 (age 31) London, England
- Listed height: 6 ft 8 in (2.03 m)
- Listed weight: 240 lb (109 kg)

Career information
- Playing career: 2013–present

Career history
- 2013–2015: Duva Oostende
- 2015–2016: Oostkamp
- 2016–2017: Surrey Scorchers
- 2017: Eisbären Bremerhaven
- 2017–2019: Surrey Scorchers
- 2019–2021: Worcester Wolves
- 2021–2022: London Lions
- 2022–2023: Nyíregyháza
- 2023: Labas-GAS Prienai
- 2023: Edmonton Stingers
- 2023–2024: CEP Lorient
- 2024–2025: Anorthosis Famagusta
- 2025: CSU Ploiești
- 2025: Keflavík
- 2026–present: London Lions

Jordan Kevin Williams (born 16 October 1995) is a British professional basketball player for the London Lions of the Super League Basketball (SLB).

== Professional career ==
In 2013, Williams joined Belgian semi-professional team Duva Oostende aged 17. He spent two seasons with the team, earning promotion to the second tier in his first season and later turning professional with the club. In 2015, he joined league rivals Oostkamp but made two brief appearances before returning to England.

In January 2016, Williams joined British Basketball League team the Surrey Scorchers. In his first season with the Scorchers, he averaged 10.3 points, 2.0 assists, 7.9 rebounds and 0.5 steals per game.

He returned to the club for the 2016–17 campaign, and averaged 7.8 points, 2.6 assists, 8.0 rebounds and 0.6 steals over 16 games. Williams began the 2017–18 season in Germany with BG Eisbaeren, but re-signed for the Scorchers in November.

In August 2018, Williams committed to the Scorchers for a fourth consecutive season. Having featured in every Scorchers season, Williams became the club's second highest appearance maker.

On 23 August 2019, Williams signed with Worcester Wolves. On 15 July 2021, he signed with the London Lions.

In August 2025, Williams signed with Keflavík of the Icelandic Úrvalsdeild karla.
