= Halifax Hoopers =

- Division: North Atlantic
- League: The Basketball League
- Founded: 2024
- History: Halifax Hoopers; 2024–2026
- Arena: Zatzman Sportsplex
- Location: Halifax, Nova Scotia
- Team colours
- General manager: Augy Jones
- Head coach: Augy Jones
- Ownership: Geoff Clyke
- Website: https://halifaxhoopers.com/

The Halifax Hoopers were a professional basketball team in Halifax, Nova Scotia, and were members of The Basketball League (TBL).

== History ==
The Halifax Hoopers were officially announced in August 2024, becoming one of the first two Canadian franchises to join The Basketball League (TBL), alongside the Port City Power of Saint John, New Brunswick. Halifax's return to the professional basketball scene follows a four-year absence after the Halifax Hurricanes, who last played in 2020, disbanded in 2021 following the COVID-19 pandemic.

The Hoopers are owned by Geoff Clyke, who has emphasized a community-driven, sustainable model of operations. Unlike previous professional teams in the region, the Hoopers aim to avoid high overhead costs by playing in university gyms—potentially at Dalhousie or Saint Mary's—rather than in the larger Scotiabank Centre. The team settled on playing at the Zatzman Sportsplex, located across the harbour from downtown Halifax.

Augy Jones was named the franchise's inaugural head coach and general manager. A Halifax native and Nova Scotia Sport Hall of Fame inductee, Jones played at St. Francis Xavier University and previously coached at both his alma mater and Saint Mary’s University in Halifax.

The Hoopers have committed to scouting Nova Scotia talent and limiting out-of-province recruitment. League rules also mandate post-game fan interaction, such as autograph sessions, to foster stronger community connections.

== Current roster ==
Halifax Hoopers roster
Players
Coaches

Pos.	No.	Nat.	Name	Ht.	Wt.	Age
PG	1	(Canada)	Barrett, Shakwon	6 ft 6 in (1.98 m)	190 lb (86 kg)
PG	2	(United States)	Davis, Tony	6 ft 3 in (1.91 m)	170 lb (77 kg)
PG	3	(Canada)	Scott, Tyler	6 ft 3 in (1.91 m)	198 lb (90 kg)
PG	7	(Canada)	Nwosu, Lansana	6 ft 3 in (1.91 m)	230 lb (100 kg)
PG	8	(Canada)	Bennett, CJ	6 ft 3 in (1.91 m)	205 lb (93 kg)
SF	9	(Canada)	Locke, Shacier	6 ft 6 in (1.98 m)	220 lb (100 kg)
SF	12	(The Bahamas)	Roker, Azaro	6 ft 6 in (1.98 m)	220 lb (100 kg)
G/F	13	(Canada)	Tynes, Josiah	6 ft 3 in (1.91 m)	175 lb (79 kg)
PF	15	(Canada)	Clarke, Akeem	6 ft 11 in (2.11 m)	260 lb (120 kg)
SF	16	(Canada)	Ottley, Anthony	6 ft 6 in (1.98 m)	215 lb (98 kg)
PG	22	(Canada)	Scott, Jaylin	6 ft 11 in (2.11 m)	260 lb (120 kg)
SF	44	(United States)	Belotti, Brandon	6 ft 4 in (1.93 m)	215 lb (98 kg)

Head coach

- (Canada) Augy Jones

Assistant coach(es)

- (Canada) Doug Partridge
- (Canada) Luc Stevenson

Legend

- (C) Team captain
- Injured

- Roster
- Transactions
Updated: May 7, 2025

== All-time record ==
Season	Division/Conference	W	L	PCT	Finish	PF	PA	Avg Attendance	Coach	Playoffs
2025	North Atlantic	16	4	.800	2nd	2274	1953	NA	Augy Jones	Lost Play-In
Total	1 Season	16	4	.800	-	2274	1953	-		
Playoff Totals	1 Appearance	0	1	.000	-	106	122	-	0 Championships	

== Playoff results ==
Season	Game	Visiting	Home
2025	North Atlantic Play-Ins	Halifax 106	Albany 122
