= Julian Washburn =

American basketball player (born 1991)

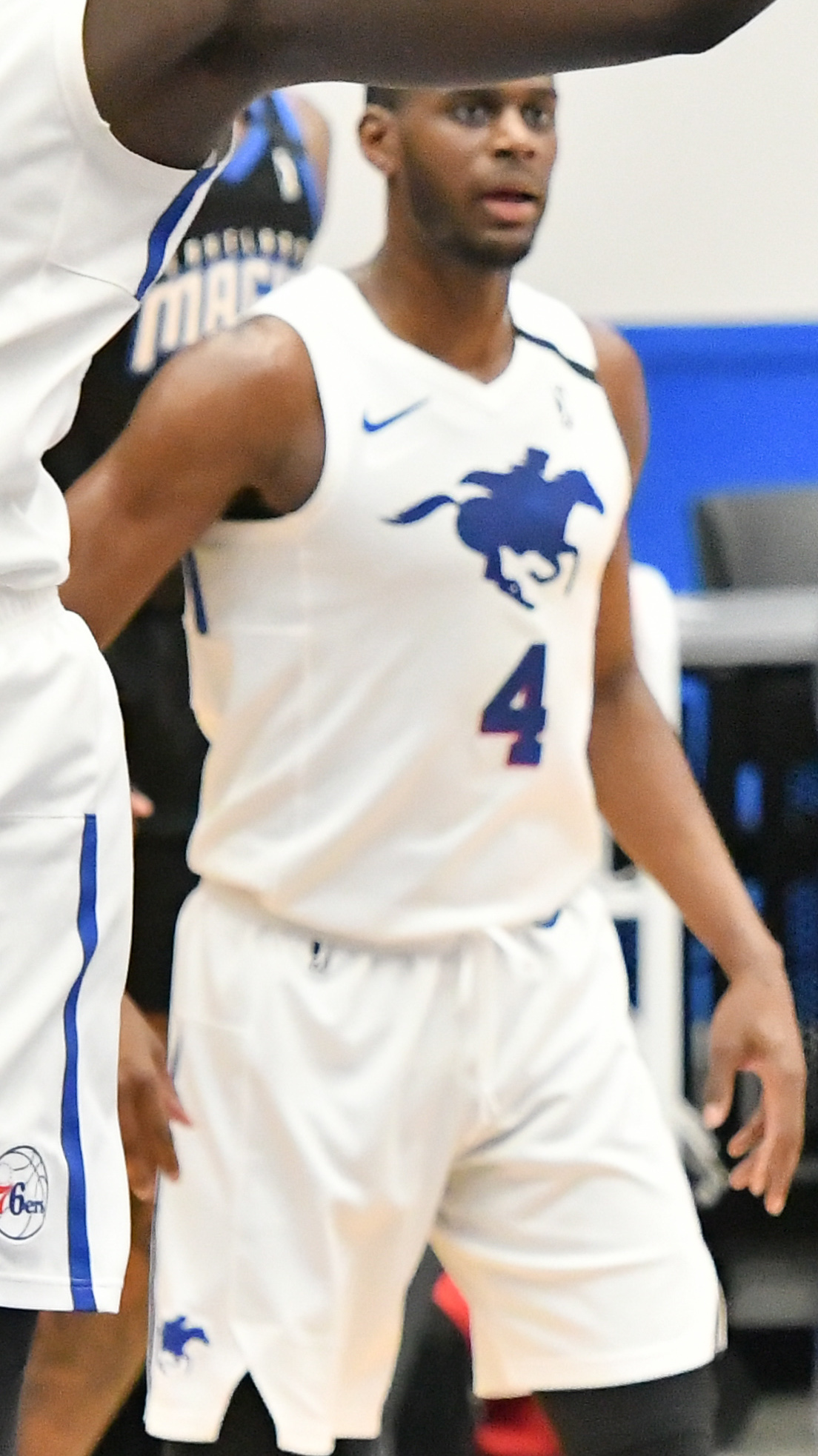
- Washburn with Delaware in 2020

Free agent
- Position: Small forward

Personal information
- Born: December 18, 1991 (age 34) Houston, Texas, U.S.
- Listed height: 6 ft 8 in (2.03 m)
- Listed weight: 205 lb (93 kg)

Career information
- High school: Duncanville (Duncanville, Texas)
- College: UTEP (2011–2015)
- NBA draft: 2015: undrafted
- Playing career: 2015–present

Career history
- 2015–2016: Austin Spurs
- 2016–2017: Tigers Tübingen
- 2017–2018: Austin Spurs
- 2018: Canterbury Rams
- 2018–2019: Austin Spurs
- 2019: Memphis Grizzlies
- 2019: →Memphis Hustle
- 2019–2020: Delaware Blue Coats
- 2020: Dorados de Chihuahua
- 2021: Delaware Blue Coats
- 2021–2022: London Lions
- 2023–2024: Austin Spurs

Career highlights
- NBA G League champion (2018); C-USA Defensive Player of the Year (2015); Second-team All-C-USA (2014); Third-team All-C-USA (2013); 3× C-USA All-Defensive Team (2013–2015); C-USA All-Freshman Team (2012)
- Stats at NBA.com
- Stats at Basketball Reference

Julian Washburn (born December 18, 1991) is an American professional basketball player who last played for the Austin Spurs of the NBA G League. He attended and played college basketball for the University of Texas El Paso.

== High school career ==
Washburn attended Duncanville High School where he saw action at point guard, shooting guard and small forward throughout his prep career. As a senior, he averaged 16 points, seven rebounds and three assists, and was rated the no. 24 small forward in the country, a top-150 player overall and a three-star recruit by Rivals.com while he was rated the no. 6 prospect in the state in the Class of 2010 by Texashoops.com.

== College career ==
After graduating high school, Washburn attended the University of Texas at El Paso, where he averaged 11.7 points, 3.8 rebounds and 2.1 assists in 34.2 minutes over 130 career games, finishing first in school history in total minutes (4,448), fourth in field goals (592) and sixth in scoring (1,526 points). On his four years with the Miners, he distinguished himself for his defensive prowess, being able to defend four positions on the floor and earned three All-Defensive team mentions and winning Conference USA's Defensive Player of the Year Award as a senior.

== Professional career ==
=== Austin Spurs (2015–2016) ===
After going undrafted in the 2015 NBA draft, Washburn joined the Golden State Warriors for the 2015 NBA Summer League. On October 22, 2015, he signed with the San Antonio Spurs, but was waived just two days later. On October 30, he was acquired by the Austin Spurs of the NBA Development League as an affiliate player of San Antonio.

=== Tigers Tübingen (2016–2017) ===
After joining the Los Angeles Clippers and the San Antonio Spurs for the 2016 NBA Summer League, Washburn signed with Tigers Tübingen of the German Basketball Bundesliga on August 5, 2016.

=== Second stint at Austin Spurs (2017–2018) ===
On November 2, 2017, Washburn was included in the 2017–18 opening night roster for Austin Spurs. In April 2018, he helped Austin win the NBA G League championship.

=== Canterbury Rams (2018) ===
On April 17, 2018, Washburn signed with the Canterbury Rams for the 2018 New Zealand NBL season.

=== Third stint at Austin Spurs (2018–2019) ===
On September 18, 2018, Washburn signed an Exhibit 10 deal with the San Antonio Spurs, but was waived three days later. On October 22, 2018, Washburn was included in the training camp roster of the Austin Spurs.

=== Memphis Grizzlies (2019) ===
On January 15, 2019, Washburn signed a two-way contract with the Memphis Grizzlies, a deal that saw him split his time between the Grizzlies and the Memphis Hustle of the NBA G League. On April 10 he scored a career high 8 points against the Golden State Warriors.

=== Delaware Blue Coats (2019–2020) ===
On July 7, 2019, Washburn was traded to the Golden State Warriors in exchange for Andre Iguodala and a protected first-round draft pick. The Warriors also received a traded player exception in the deal. He was waived on July 17, 2019.

He was named to the training camp roster of the Delaware Blue Coats, which acquired his returning players rights from the Austin Spurs. Washburn averaged 6.5 points and 4.8 rebounds per game.

=== Dorados de Chihuahua (2020) ===
On November 3, 2020, Washburn signed with the Dorados de Chihuahua of the Liga Nacional de Baloncesto Profesional.

=== Return to Delaware (2021) ===
On January 14, 2021, Washburn re-signed with the Delaware Blue Coats where he averaged 7.9 points, 2.6 rebounds and 1.4 assists on 42 and 36 per cent shooting from field goal and three-point range, respectively.

=== London Lions (2021–2022) ===
On June 11, 2021, Washburn signed with the Fraser Valley Bandits of the Canadian Elite Basketball League, but didn't play for them. On July 9, he signed with the London Lions of the British Basketball League (BBL).

=== Fourth stint at Austin (2023–2024) ===
On November 20, 2023, Washburn joined the Austin Spurs of the NBA G League. However, he was waived on November 4, 2024.

== Career statistics ==
Legend
GP	Games played	GS	Games started	MPG	Minutes per game
FG%	Field goal percentage	3P%	3-point field goal percentage	FT%	Free throw percentage
RPG	Rebounds per game	APG	Assists per game	SPG	Steals per game
BPG	Blocks per game	PPG	Points per game	**Bold**	Career high

=== NBA ===
==== Regular season ====
Year	Team	GP	GS	MPG	FG%	3P%	FT%	RPG	APG	SPG	BPG	PPG
2018–19	Memphis	18	3	14.1	.333	.208	.750	2.3	.8	.7	.1	2.2
Career		18	3	14.1	.333	.208	.750	2.3	.8	.7	.1	2.2

== Personal life ==
Washburn is the son of former NBA player Chris Washburn and Michelle Williams Washburn. He has four brothers and majored in Multidisciplinary Studies. His brother, Chris Washburn Jr. also played professionally overseas.
