= Kylor Kelley =

American basketball player (born 1997)

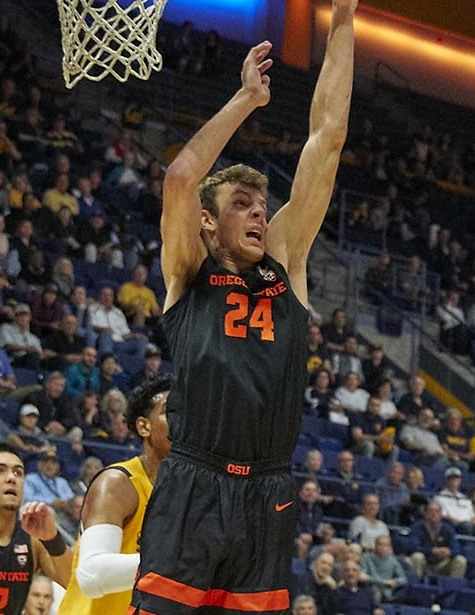
- Kelley with Oregon State in 2020

No. 35 – Sioux Falls Skyforce
- Position: Center
- League: NBA G League

Personal information
- Born: August 26, 1997 (age 29) Logan, Utah, U.S.
- Listed height: 7 ft 0 in (2.13 m)
- Listed weight: 230 lb (104 kg)

Career information
- High school: Gervais (Gervais, Oregon)
- College: Northwest Christian (2015–2017); Lane CC (2017–2018); Oregon State (2018–2020)
- NBA draft: 2020: undrafted
- Playing career: 2021–present

Career history
- 2021: Austin Spurs
- 2021–2022: London Lions
- 2022: Bakken Bears
- 2023: Raptors 905
- 2023: Salem Capitals
- 2023: Calgary Surge
- 2023–2024: Maine Celtics
- 2024: Salem Capitals
- 2024–2025: South Bay Lakers
- 2025: Dallas Mavericks
- 2025: South Bay Lakers
- 2025: New Orleans Pelicans
- 2025: Pallacanestro Trieste
- 2025–2026: South Bay Lakers
- 2026: Converge FiberXers
- 2026: NBA G League United
- 2026–present: Sioux Falls Skyforce

Career highlights
- FIBA Intercontinental Cup champion (2026); NBA G League All-Defensive Team (2024); NBA G League Blocks leader (2024); 2× Pac-12 All-Defensive Team (2019, 2020); NWAC All-Defensive Team (2018)
- Stats at NBA.com
- Stats at Basketball Reference

Kylor Kelley (born August 26, 1997) is an American professional basketball player for the Sioux Falls Skyforce of the NBA G League. He played college basketball for the Oregon State Beavers.

== Early life ==
Kelley grew up playing basketball under the coaching of his mother, a former high school player. At age six or seven, he moved with his mother and brother from Utah to Oregon after his parents split. Kelley played three years of varsity basketball for Gervais High School in Gervais, Oregon. While attending Gervais, he grew from 6'1 to 7'0 but did not weigh more than 185 pounds. As a senior, Kelley averaged 15.9 points, 12.4 rebounds, 7.8 blocks, and 2.4 assists per game and was named PacWest Player of the Year. He set the school's career, single-season and single-game records for blocks. Kelley did not qualify to play for most four-year colleges. As a result, he had no NCAA Division I offers out of high school.

== College career ==
Kelley began playing college basketball for Northwest Christian University. As a freshman, Kelley averaged 8.6 points, 8.8 rebounds and 5.6 blocks per game and set a school single-game record with 10 blocks against Southern Oregon. After 10 games, he was dismissed from Bushnell. Kelley transferred to Lane Community College, where he received more Division I interest as a result. In his sophomore season, he averaged 9.9 points, 7.5 rebounds and 4.6 blocks per game and was a Northwest Athletic Conference All-Defensive Team selection.

At Lane CC, Kelley was recruited by multiple Pac-12 programs and chose to continue his career at Oregon State because he wanted to stay close to home. On December 17, 2018, as a junior at Oregon State, Kelley tallied a school-record nine blocks, to go with 10 points and nine rebounds, in an 82–67 victory over Pepperdine. By the end of the season, he ranked second in the nation, led the Pac-12 and set a school record with 3.35 blocks per game. He also averaged 7.7 points and five rebounds per game and was named to the Pac-12 All-Defensive Team. On December 18, 2019, as a senior, Kelley posted a season-high 23 points, six rebounds and three blocks in an 88–78 win over UTSA. He became Oregon State's all-time leader in blocks in a January 30, 2020, victory over Stanford, during which he posted 10 points, seven blocks and six rebounds. Kelley finished his senior season averaging 11.1 points, 5.3 rebounds and 3.45 blocks per game, earning Pac-12 All-Defensive Team honors for a second time. He averaged the second-most blocks per game in the nation and led the Pac-12 in that category. Despite the Pac-12 Tournament being cancelled due to the coronavirus pandemic, Kelley finished with 211 blocks in two years at Oregon State.

== Professional career ==
=== Austin Spurs (2021) ===
After going undrafted in the 2020 NBA draft, on December 11, 2020, Kelley was reported to have signed with the San Antonio Spurs and subsequently waived by the San Antonio Spurs. Kelley was included in the roster of Austin Spurs.

=== London Lions (2021–2022) ===
On July 21, 2021, Kelley signed with the London Lions for the 2021–22 BBL season.

=== Bakken Bears (2022) ===
On August 29, 2022, Kelley signed with Bakken Bears of the Champions League and the Danish Basketligaen. However, he left the team on December 5, after 10 appearances.

=== Raptors 905 (2023) ===
On December 20, 2022, Kelley was reacquired by the Austin Spurs, but was waived the next day without playing for the team. On January 6, 2023, he was acquired by Raptors 905.

=== Salem Capitals (2023) ===
Kelley joined the Salem Capitals of The Basketball League (TBL) for the 2023 season.

=== Calgary Surge (2023) ===
On May 12, 2023, Kelley signed with the Calgary Surge of the Canadian Elite Basketball League.

=== Maine Celtics (2023–2024) ===
On October 3, 2023, Kelley signed with the Boston Celtics, but was waived the next day. On October 28, he joined the Maine Celtics.

=== Return to Salem (2024) ===
Kelley again joined the Salem Capitals for the 2024 season.

=== South Bay Lakers (2024–2025) ===
On August 14, 2024, Kelley signed with the Los Angeles Lakers, but was waived on October 18. On October 26, he joined the South Bay Lakers.

=== Dallas Mavericks (2025) ===
On January 26, 2025, Kelley signed a two-way contract with the Dallas Mavericks. He made his NBA debut the next day against the Washington Wizards, scoring one point and grabbing four rebounds in a blowout win. Kelley was waived by Dallas on March 3.

=== Return to South Bay (2025) ===
On March 8, 2025, the South Bay Lakers announced that Kelley had re-joined their roster.

=== New Orleans Pelicans (2025) ===
On April 3, 2025, the New Orleans Pelicans announced that they had signed Kelley to 10-day contract. On April 13, Kelley re-signed with the Pelicans for the final game of the season.

=== Pallacanestro Trieste (2025) ===
On May 7, 2025, he signed with Pallacanestro Trieste of the Italian Lega Basket Serie A (LBA).

=== Third stint with South Bay (2025–2026) ===
On August 25, 2025, Kelley signed with the Los Angeles Lakers. He got waived by Los Angeles on September 28. Kelley subsequently re-joined the South Bay Lakers.

=== Converge FiberXers (2026) ===
On February 18, 2026, it was reported that the Converge FiberXers of the Philippine Basketball Association (PBA) has tapped the services of Kelley as its import in the upcoming 2026 PBA Commissioner's Cup.

=== Sioux Falls Skyforce (2026–present) ===
On September 29, 2026, the Sioux Falls Skyforce acquired the returning player rights to Kelley from the Coachella Valley Lakers.

== Career statistics ==
Legend
GP	Games played	GS	Games started	MPG	Minutes per game
FG%	Field goal percentage	3P%	3-point field goal percentage	FT%	Free throw percentage
RPG	Rebounds per game	APG	Assists per game	SPG	Steals per game
BPG	Blocks per game	PPG	Points per game	**Bold**	Career high

=== NBA ===
==== Regular season ====
Year	Team	GP	GS	MPG	FG%	3P%	FT%	RPG	APG	SPG	BPG	PPG
2024–25	Dallas	**8**	**1**	8.3	**.769**	—	**.667**	2.6	.3	.0	**.3**	3.0
2024–25	New Orleans	3	**1**	**19.7**	.444	—	.500	**6.0**	**1.0**	**.3**	**.3**	**3.3**
Career		11	2	11.4	.636	—	.600	3.5	.5	.1	.3	3.1

=== College ===
Year	Team	GP	GS	MPG	FG%	3P%	FT%	RPG	APG	SPG	BPG	PPG
2018–19	Oregon State	**31**	25	23.5	**.654**	—	.613	5.0	.4	**.3**	3.4	7.7
2019–20	Oregon State	**31**	**31**	**29.1**	.604	.000	**.681**	**5.3**	**.9**	**.3**	**3.5**	**11.1**
Career		62	56	26.3	.624	.000	.657	5.1	.7	.3	3.4	9.4

== Personal life ==
Kelley's father, Jeff, played college basketball for Boise State. His mother, Shandel Howell, had intended to play the same sport for Utah State before its women's program was cut by the university.
