= Virginia Valley Vipers =

Professional American basketball team

- League: 94x50 League
- Founded: 2022
- Arena: Patrick Henry College at Barbara Hodel Center Gymnasium (Viper Pit) in Purcellville, VA
- Location: Loudoun County, Virginia
- Team colors
- General manager: Davies Rosen Jr.
- Head coach: Jasper Williams Lead Assist   = Samir St. Clair Development Coach = Chris Braswell
- Ownership: Rodney O.E. Culbreath; Christine "Tina" Stevens-Culbreath; Rze Culbreath, Rodney D Culbreath Jr
- Website: Official website

The Virginia Valley Vipers are an American professional men's basketball team based in Loudoun County, Virginia, and a member of the 94x50 League.

== History ==
Loudoun County is the new home of the Virginia Valley Vipers basketball team, a professional men’s team that is part of The Basketball League, the third largest league in North America. The Virginia Valley Vipers will kick off the 2025 season at Patrick Henry College at Barbara Hodel Center Gymnasium.

On October 28, 2022, Evelyn Magley, CEO of The Basketball League, announced the league would be expanding to Virginia with the Virginia Valley Vipers franchise, which would play in the league's Northeast Conference. The Vipers were founded by team market owners Rodney, Christine and Rze Culbreath. Rze had previously played in the league for the Tri-State Admirals prior to the Vipers’ founding.

Andrew Oates was named head coach for the 2023 season, bringing on Willie Lewis as an assistant coach. The Vipers completed the 2023 season with a record of 5 wins and 19 losses. Following the completion of the 2023 season, the Vipers released the 2023 coaching staff.

On October 24, 2023, the Vipers announced Lester Conner would be joining the organization as the head coach. Conner is a former professional basketball player who played for numerous NBA teams and served as the assistant coach for half a dozen NBA teams.

May 2024: Tre Brown took over as the interim Head Coach for the remainder of the 2024 season

On October 1, 2024, Darien Almond was named head coach for the 2025 season, with Casey Frederick serving as his assistant coach.

July 15, 2025, the Virginia Valley Vipers hired Coach Ed Corporal, who has 41 years of coaching experience, and will enter his 10th season in the TBL in 2026. He coached Lindy Waters III — the first TBL player to earn a spot on a National Basketball Association team — during the Enid Outlaws’ 2021 championship season. The Virginia Valley Vipers will be guided by one of the most successful coaches in The Basketball League history. Coach Ed has hired Coach Derrick Lewis and Coach Tre Brown as his assistant coaches. Coach Derrick Lewis took over mid-season due to Coach Ed stepping down for health reasons.

August 21, 2026: Virginia Valley Vipers hired Davies Rosen Jr. as the new General Manager. August 21, 2026 Virginia Valley Vipers hires Jasper Williams as the Head Coach. Coach Williams has hired Samir St. Clair as his lead assistant and hired Chris Braswell as Player Development & Assistant Coach
