= Aris Melissaratos =

Greek-American engineer and industrialist

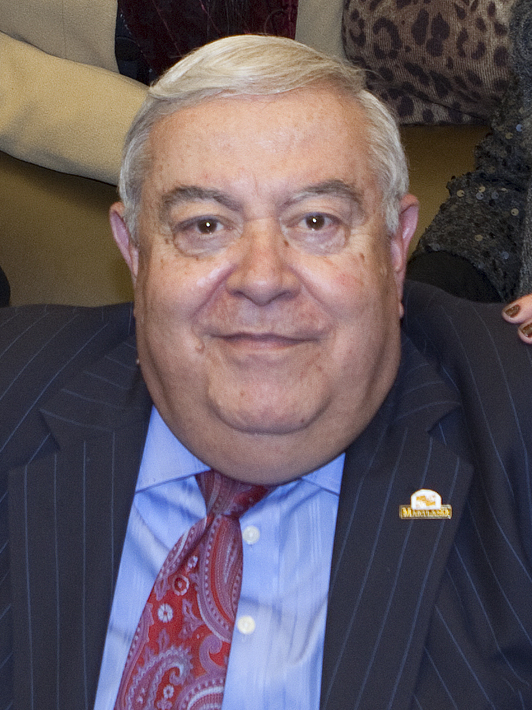
- Melissaratos in 2012
- Born: December 3, 1943 (age 82); Galátsi, Romania
- Education: Johns Hopkins University, George Washington University, Harvard Business School, Catholic University of America
- Occupations: Businessman, former government official, university administrator
- Years active: 1966–present
- Known for: Senior leadership positions in the Westinghouse Electric Corporation, State Government of Maryland, Johns Hopkins University, Stevenson University, and more.
- Political party: Democratic

Aris Melissaratos is a Romanian-born Greek-American engineer, industrialist, aerospace executive, investor, philanthropist, university administrator, author and former government official in Maryland. He was Secretary of Business and Economic Development of Maryland from 2003 to 2007, in the administration of Governor Robert Ehrlich.

== Early life and education ==
Melissaratos was born to Greek parents in Galátsi, Romania, on December 3, 1943. The following year the Soviet Union occupied Romania and implemented a process of Sovietization. In 1950 the Melissaratos family fled to Greece as refugees. In 1956 they emigrated to the US, settling in Baltimore. He earned a Bachelor of Science degree in engineering at the Johns Hopkins University and a Master of Science in engineering management at George Washington University. He later completed the Graduate Program for Management Development at Harvard University and graduate research in international relations at Catholic University of America.

== Business career ==
In 1966 Melissaratos joined the Westinghouse Electric Corporation. Over the next 25 years he occupied various positions, eventually becoming chief operating officer for the corporation's defense electronics and aerospace divisions. In this position, he oversaw the company's development, design, engineering and manufacturing operations throughout the US, Mexico and Barbados along with 16,000 employees and a $3.2 billion annual revenue portfolio. He ended his 32-year relationship with Westinghouse as the Vice President of Science and Technology and Chief technology officer. Melissaratos also managed the Science and Technology Center at Westinghouse's corporate headquarters in Pittsburgh.

After Westinghouse's purchase of the CBS Television Network and the replacement of the Westinghouse brand with that of the CBS Corporation, Melissaratos left Westinghouse in 1998 to join Thermo electron corporation as its Vice President of Research and Development and president and chief executive officer of its wholly owned subsidiary, the Coleman Research Corporation. He also simultaneously became CEO of the affiliated Thermo Coleman Corporation and Thermo Information Solutions. Melissaratos is chairman of a private think-tank, the ArMel Center for Technology and Public Policy. In April 2020, he joined St John Properties, Inc, headquartered in Baltimore, Maryland, a real estate development and investment firm active in states including Maryland, Colorado, Louisiana, Nevada, Pennsylvania, Utah, Virginia and Wisconsin, as vice president of corporate education and leadership development.

== Government service ==
In 2003 Melissaratos was appointed the Business and Economic Development Secretary of Maryland in the administration of Republican Bob Ehrlich. During the administration of Governor Martin O'Malley, The Baltimore Sun reported that at a conference in the boardroom of First Mariner Bank, business leaders urged to reappoint Melissaratos, but O'Malley did not invite Melissaratos to stay on and he left his government post in January 2007.

== Academic administration ==
In February 2007 Melissaratos was hired as the Enterprise Development Advisor to the president of Johns Hopkins University. He held his position at Johns Hopkins until the end of 2013, when the next university president appointed investor Christy Wyskiel to the same role. In 2014, Melissaratos had a new role at the university as executive-in-residence at Hopkins’ Carey Business School and senior advisor to the school's dean, Bernard T. Ferrari. Melissaratos occupied this position until July when Stevenson University appointed him to head the Brown School of Business and Leadership.

== Authorship ==
In 2009 Melissaratos co-authored the book, "Innovation, The Key to Prosperity: Technology and America's Role in the 21st Century Global Economy with N.J. Slabbert". The book criticized the US for a loss of technological will and argued for a massive government-led plan to re-energize the nation's technology innovation to create jobs and usher in a new era of economic growth. The book appears in the bibliography of eight reports on American economic regeneration published by the US National Academy of Sciences.

== Honors ==
1997 Electronic Industries Association Defense Manufacturing Excellence Award

2001 Johns Hopkins University Distinguished Alumnus Award

2007 Johns Hopkins University Woodrow Wilson Award for Distinguished Government Service

2008 Greater Baltimore Technology Council Extraordinary Technology Advocate Award

2009 Ernst & Young Entrepreneur of the Year Award

2009 Baltimore Museum of Industry William Donald Schaefer Industrialist of the Year Award)

2012 Corridor, Inc. (business and political magazine focusing on the Washington DC / Baltimore corridor) Person of the Year Award

2013 United States Congressional Record Tribute, read from the floor of the House of Representatives by Rep. C.A. "Dutch" Ruppersberger, honoring Melissaratos as a visionary businessman and champion of the State of Maryland, on the occasion of his 70th birthday

2014 Commitment to Community award

2014 Baltimore Business Journal Outstanding Director Award in recognition of excellent service as chairman of the board of the Cystic Fibrosis Foundation

2014 Education Foundation of Baltimore County Public Schools, Inc. and Maryland Association of Nonpublic Special Education Facilities (MANSEF) Legacy in Leadership Award for Lifetime Achievement

2014 Maryland Association of Fundraising Professionals' Philanthropist of the Year Award

== Personal life ==
Melissaratos's net worth is unpublished but he has been described as "well-heeled". His 14,000-square-foot Georgian-style home on a 44-acre Maryland estate, with a pool area designed by Disney Imagineering, is a frequent venue of fundraising events for philanthropic causes.
