= Reading Rebels =

- League: 94x50 League
- Founded: 2021
- History: Reading Rebels; 2022–present
- Arena: Alvernia University
- Location: Reading, Pennsylvania
- Team colors
- General manager: Dominic Lebo
- Head coach: Mike Mahon
- Ownership: Jon Gross, Alex Bernhard, Merritt Marable
- Website: www.readingrebels.net

The Reading Rebels are a professional basketball team in Reading, Pennsylvania, and members of the 94x50 League.

== History ==
On March 1, 2021 it was announced that Reading, Pennsylvania would be awarded a franchise for the upcoming 2022 TBL season.

On November 24, 2021, a press conference occurred where it was officially announced that Co-team market owners Jonathan Gross, President/General Manager, Alex Bernhard, Director of Player Development/Assistant General Manager, and Merritt Marable, Executive VP of Basketball Operations.

Continuing into 2026, the Reading Rebels are now gearing up for their 5th season in Reading. They have now joined the inaugural season of the 94x50 League. The Rebels however are looking to make a run after signing back All-Star PG Aquille Carr.
