= California Sea-Kings =

California Sea Kings
- League: The Basketball League
- Founded: 2009
- History: California Sea Kings; 2009–present
- Location: San Jose, California
- Team colors
- President: Vic Goodwin
- Head coach: Wallace Bryant
- Website: Official website

The California Sea Kings are a professional basketball team in San Jose, California, and members of The Basketball League (TBL).

== History ==
The California Sea Kings were founded in 2008, and joined the ABA for the 2009 season. After 11 seasons the team decided to become a professional basketball team.

On November 23, 2020, The Basketball League (TBL) announced the Sea-Kings would join the league for the 2021 season.
