= Sports in Montreal =

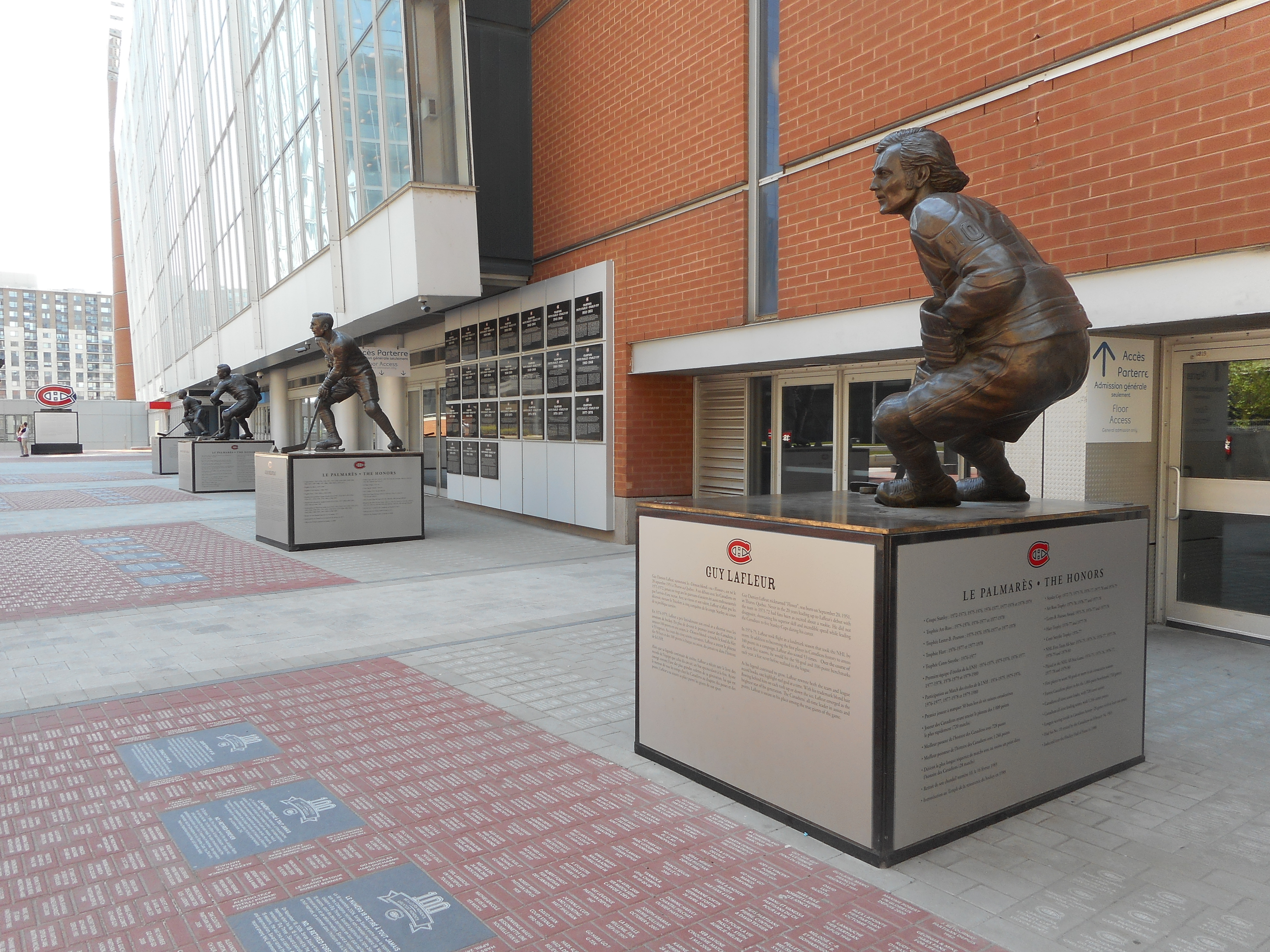
Statues of former Montreal Canadiens players at the Bell Centre, a multipurpose arena in Montreal

Sports in Montreal have played a major role in the city's history. Montreal is best known for being home to the Montreal Canadiens of the National Hockey League, which are currently the city's only team in the "Big Four" major professional sports leagues.

Other professional teams in Montreal include the Montreal Alouettes of the Canadian Football League, CF Montréal of Major League Soccer, and Montréal Victoire of the Professional Women's Hockey League.

Montreal is also well known for hosting the annual Formula One Canadian Grand Prix.

In the past, Montreal has also hosted many sporting events, namely the 1976 Summer Olympics. It was also home to the Montreal Expos of Major League Baseball from 1969 to the 2004 season.

== Professional and amateur sports ==
=== Canadian football ===
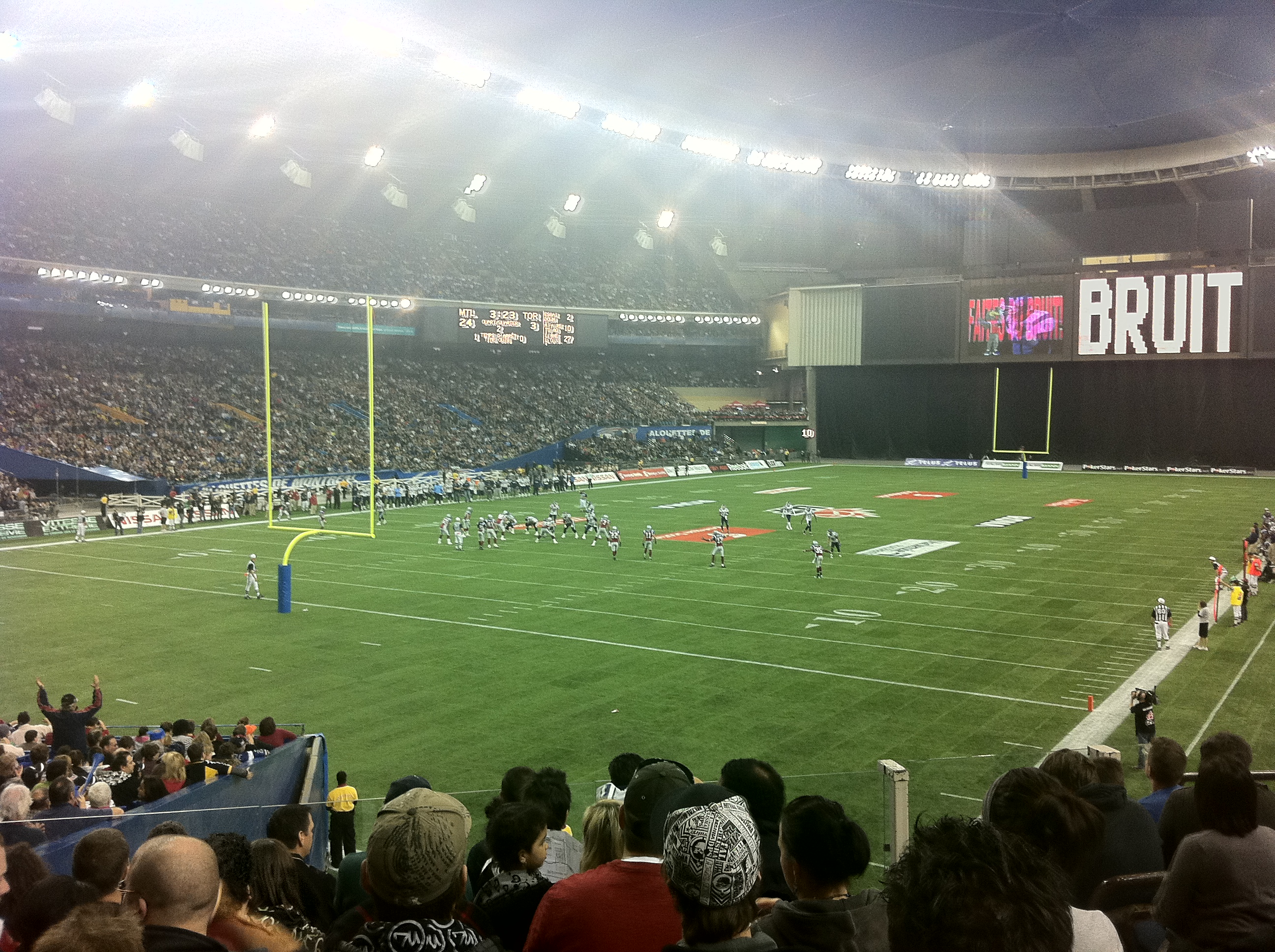
A game between the Montreal Alouettes and the Toronto Argonauts in 2010 at Montreal's Olympic Stadium

The Montreal Alouettes of the CFL play at Molson Stadium and have been one of the most successful CFL teams in terms of championships won and sellout crowds. The Alouettes have won 8 Grey Cup championships in their history. In women's football, the Montreal Blitz currently represent the city in the Central Canadian Women's Football League.

Although university football has long been popular with Anglo Montrealers, who support the McGill Redbirds and Concordia Stingers, enthusiastic Francophone crowds also enjoy the Université de Montréal's Carabins.

=== Ice hockey ===
The development of modern ice hockey occurred in Montreal. The city is famous for its enthusiastic ice hockey fans. The Montreal Canadiens is the most successful and one of the highest valued franchises in the NHL. Montreal was home to the Montreal Canadiennes, a professional women's team that won the Clarkson Cup in 2009, 2011, 2012, and 2017 before the Canadian Women's Hockey League folded in 2019. In 2024, a new professional women's team debuted, with Montréal Victoire representing the city in the PWHL. The Laval Rocket of the American Hockey League play at Place Bell.

Montreal's off-island suburb of Boisbriand is home to the Quebec Major Junior Hockey League's Blainville-Boisbriand Armada.

=== Ringette ===
The Montréal Mission compete in the National Ringette League. In 2023, they won silver at the Canadian Ringette Championships.

=== Soccer ===
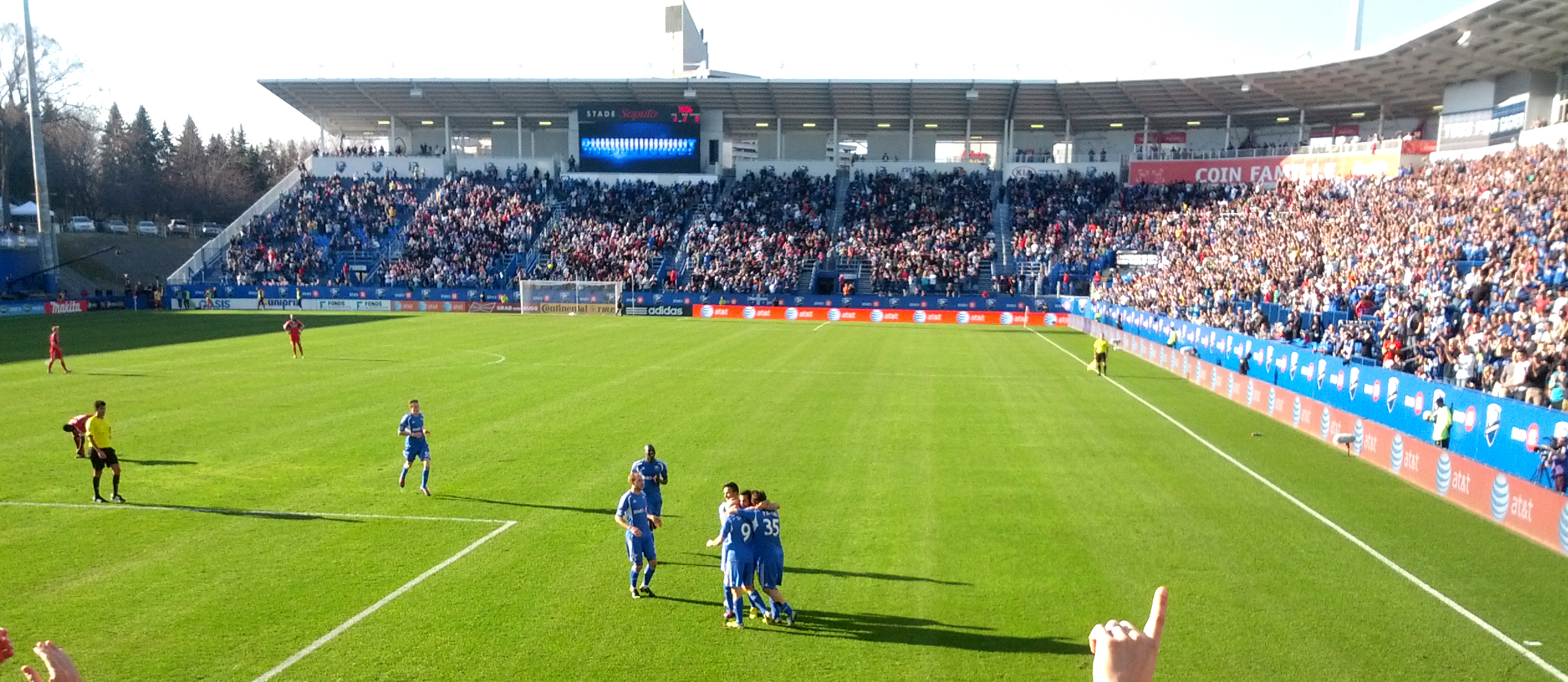
Members of CF Montréal celebrate a goal at Saputo Stadium

The city's current soccer team is the CF Montréal (known as the Montreal Impact until 2021), who joined Major League Soccer in 2012, the top tier of the American Soccer Pyramid, and play home games at Saputo Stadium. Montreal's first professional women's soccer team, Montreal Roses FC of the Northern Super League, began play in 2025. Montreal also has a Canadian Premier League team based in Laval, FC Supra du Québec.

Montreal was home to two previous women's teams: WSL affiliate, FC Montreal and the Laval Comets of the W-League, the second tier of women's soccer in the United States and Canada.

=== Australian rules football ===
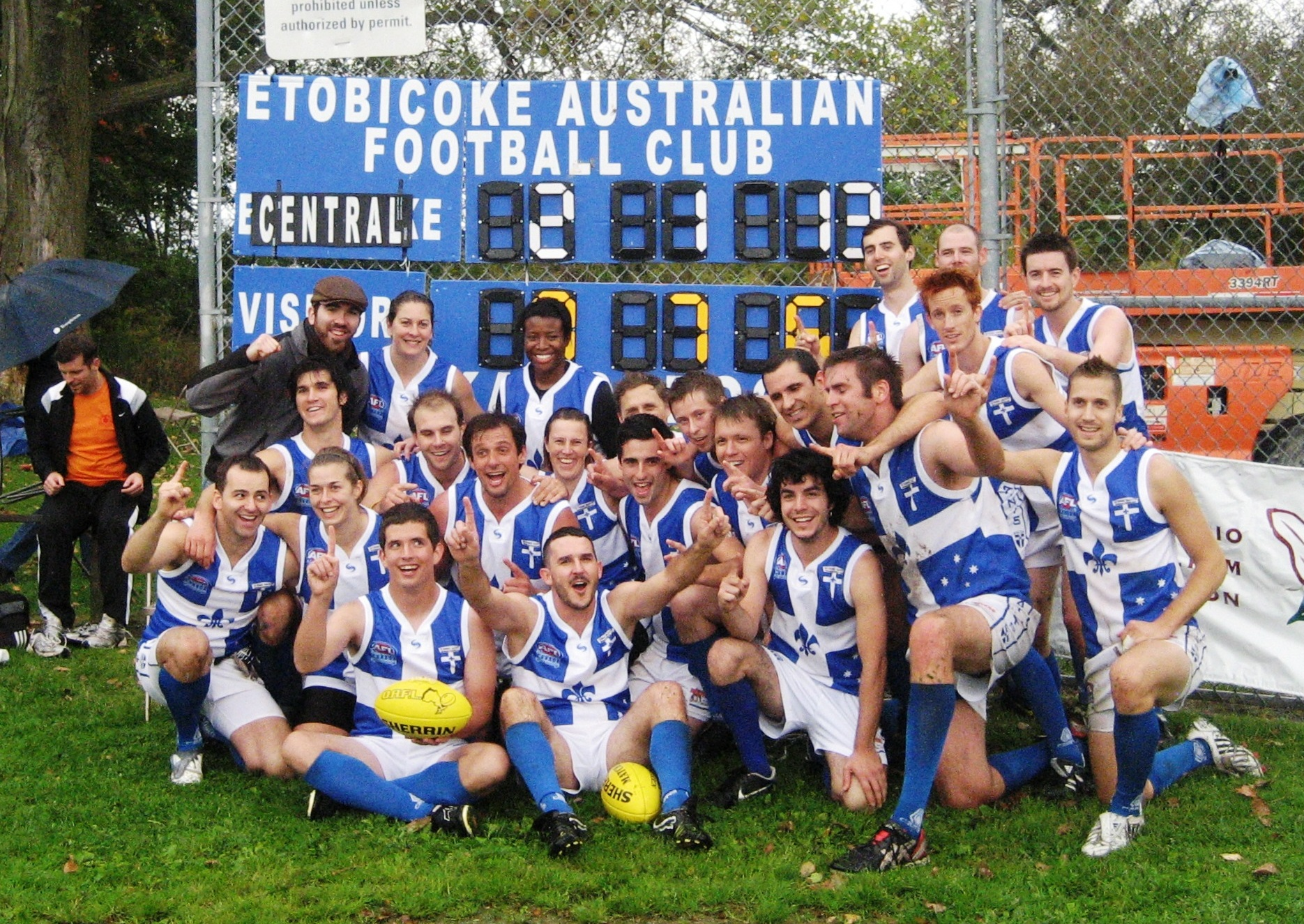
Members of the Quebec Saints in 2010, an Australian-rules football team based in Montreal

AFL Quebec is the governing body of Australian Rules Football in Quebec. Based primarily out of Montreal and surrounding areas, it includes both a Men's and a Women's League. AFL Quebec prides itself on been one of the fastest growing and best runs leagues in Canada and North America.

AFL Quebec Men's League consists of four clubs, the West Island Wooders, Laval Bombers, Montreal Demons, and Old Montreal Dockers while the newly expanded Women's League also consists of four clubs, the NDG Devils and the Plateau Eagles from Montreal and the Carleton Warriors and Rideau Shamrocks from Ottawa.

Like most leagues outside of Australia, AFL Quebec is a nine a side league in both the men and the women. This is for numerous reasons, including but not limited to local player development and field availability. AFL Quebec plays the vast majority of its regular and final series games at Vanier College.

The AFL Quebec Regular Season runs over nine rounds from mid-May until early September. This is followed by finals in mid to late September, with three rounds of finals for the men and two rounds of finals for the women's.

AFL Quebec has both representative Men's and Women's 18 a side teams. These teams are known as the Quebec Saints, Montreal Angels and Ottawa Lady Swans respectively. They compete against other 18 a side representative team across Canada and North America. Generally these games occur a handful number of times over a season either in one off games or more commonly at invitational tournament. Such a tournament is the AFL Quebec Women's Tournament held early May every year.

=== Boxing ===
Montreal has become one of the top boxing cities in the world, hosting the third most events in North America, only behind Atlantic City and Las Vegas. The city also currently has two world champions in Jean Pascal and Lucian Bute as well as a number of top contenders such as Herman Ngoudjo, Joachim Alcine, Adrian Diaconu and Sebastian Demers.

=== Baseball ===
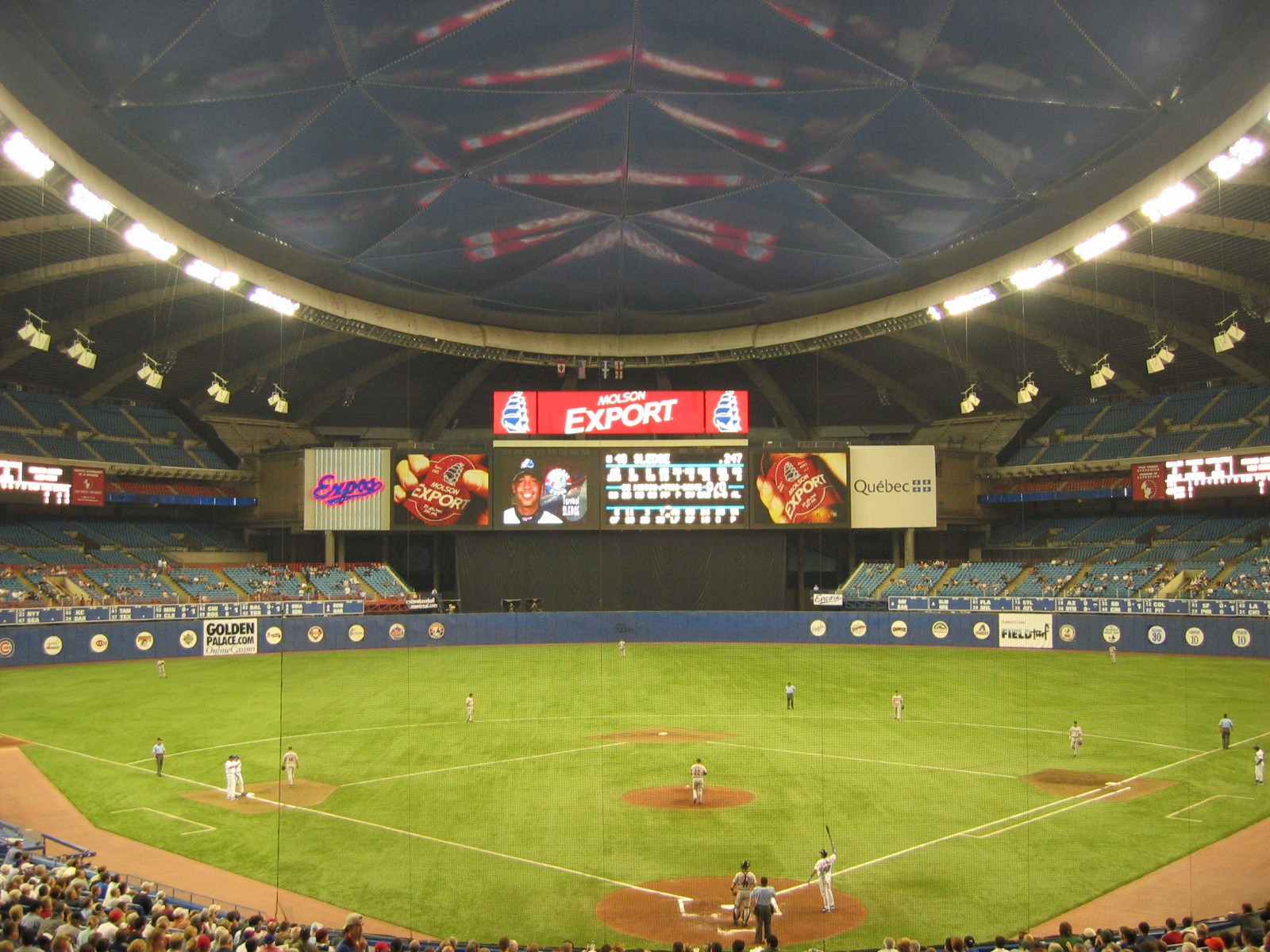
A Montreal Expos game at Olympic Stadium in 2004, their final season in the city

From 1897 to 1917 and from 1928 to 1960, Montreal fielded a minor league team, the Montreal Royals, most famous for having Jackie Robinson as a player for the 1946 season.

Montreal was the home of a major league baseball team, the Montreal Expos, named after the 1967 World's Fair, and began playing in the National League from 1969. On July 13, 1982, Montreal hosted the first Major League Baseball All-Star Game outside the United States. However, due to low attendance and other financial factors, the team moved to Washington, D.C. in 2005, where it was renamed the Washington Nationals.

A two-game MLB exhibition pre-season series between the Toronto Blue Jays and the New York Mets were played on March 28–29, 2014 at Olympic Stadium in front of sold-out crowds. This proved to be very popular with Montrealers, and the Blue Jays (as the home team) hosted the Cincinnati Reds in 2015, the Boston Red Sox in 2016, the Pittsburgh Pirates in 2017, the St. Louis Cardinals in 2018, and the Milwaukee Brewers in 2019. (On March 23 and 24, 2020 the Blue Jays were scheduled to host the New York Yankees at Olympic Stadium but the two-game series were canceled due to the COVID-19 pandemic.) All six of the two-game series were played in an attempt to gauge the city's interest in a revived Expos franchise. The Board of Trade of Metropolitan Montreal is also actively working on building a new stadium downtown and bringing back a major league baseball team to Montreal.

=== Basketball ===
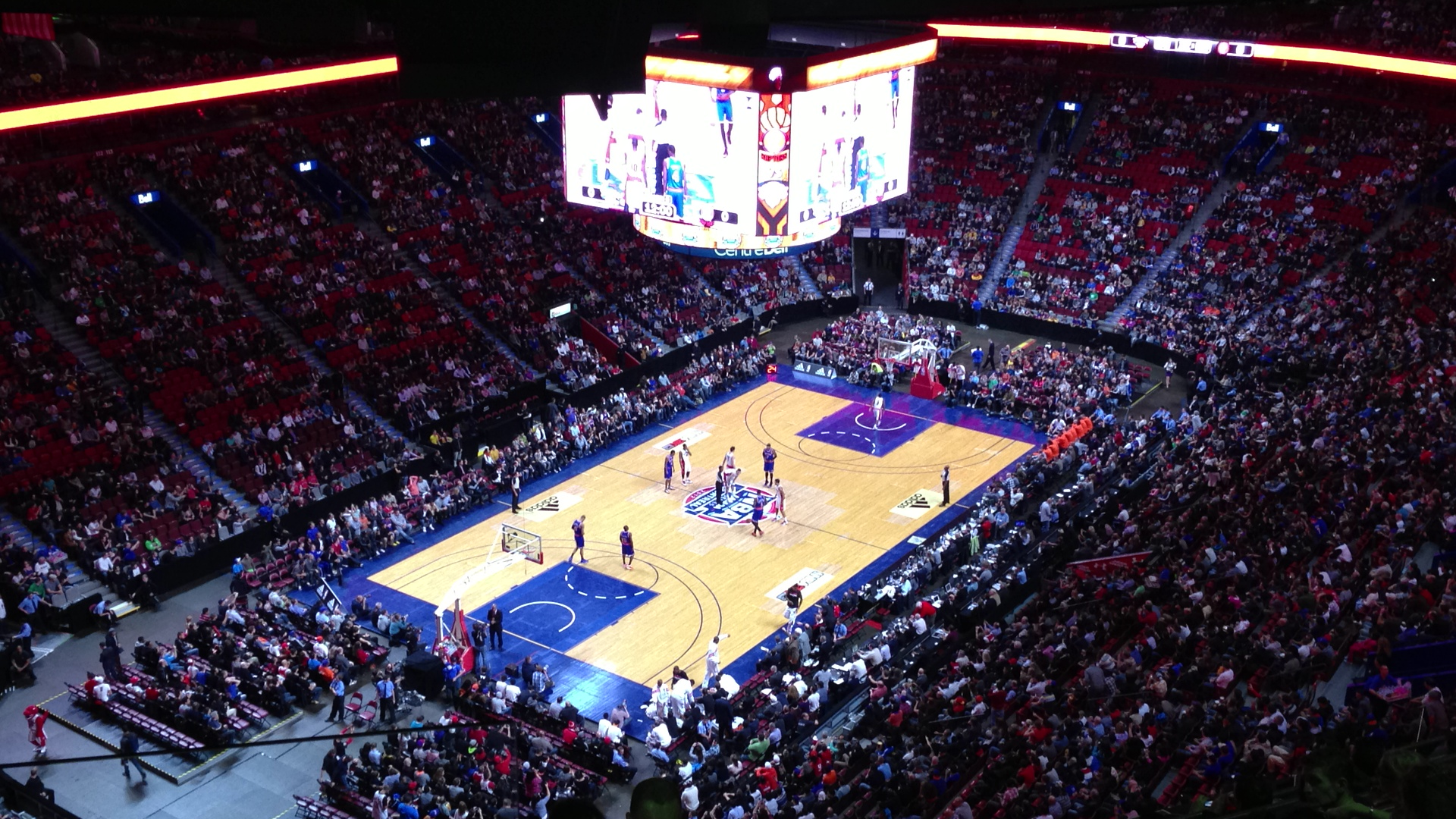
The Bell Centre reconfigured for an NBA exhibition game

Montreal has had several minor pro basketball teams. Currently the city is home to the Montreal Alliance of the Canadian Elite Basketball League, and the Montreal Toundra of The Basketball League. Previously the Montreal Jazz played a single season in the National Basketball League of Canada.

Montreal has also established itself as a popular place for NBA preseason games. On October 22, 2010, the Bell Centre hosted the first pre-season National Basketball Association (NBA) game between the Toronto Raptors and the New York Knicks. This was followed by further games on October 19, 2012, when they faced the New York Knicks, October 20, 2013, when the Boston Celtics played against the Minnesota Timberwolves, October 24, 2014, when the Toronto Raptors played against the New York Knicks, October 23, 2015, when the Toronto Raptors played against the Washington Wizards, October 10, 2018, when the Toronto Raptors played against the Brooklyn Nets, October 14, 2022, when the Toronto Raptors played against the Boston Celtics, and October 12, 2023, when the Oklahoma City Thunder played against the Detroit Pistons. All eight games were held at the Bell Centre and were sold out. They were played in an attempt to gauge the city's interest in a full-time team.

Montreal is considered a possible future location for an NBA team.

=== Gaelic sports ===
The Gaelic games of hurling and Gaelic football, governed by the Gaelic Athletic Association, have been played in Montreal since 1948. These sports have become increasingly popular with locals and new Irish immigrants. Beginners are actively encouraged. Games are played against other cities such as Quebec City, Toronto, Kingston, Ottawa, Halifax, and St. John's. There is also a domestic co-ed Montreal Gaelic Football Superleague open to complete beginners. They are played under the banner of the Montreal Shamrocks GAC. Despite having no home field, Gaelic sports have grown leaps and bounds over the years, many requests have been submitted to the city as the Shamrocks await a permanent home.

=== Roller derby ===
Montréal Roller Derby were the first non-U.S. roller derby league to gain membership in the Women's Flat Track Derby Association (WFTDA). The league hosts the annual "Beast of the East" tournament for intraleague (club) roller derby teams from eastern Canada. As of November 30, 2015, their travel team was ranked 15th in WFTDA's East region.

=== Rugby ===
Rugby is a sport in expansion on the island. The rugby teams are divided by their language and their division, but over all it is a big family trying to expand a sport misunderstood and unknown by many. Montreal boasts a dozen rugby clubs, including the oldest in North America, Westmount Rugby Club, founded in 1878 and the newest Rugby XV de Montreal created in 2010. Traditionally associated with the Anglo community, rugby has seen a sharp rise in Francophone participation in recent decades. Quebec Caribou, drawing many players from Montreal clubs, represented the province in the Rugby Canada Super League before the league's demise following the 2008 season, and now represents the province in the Rugby Canada National Junior Championship. The province's senior players are also eligible for selection to the Atlantic Rock, a St. John's-based team which represents Canada's five easternmost provinces in the Canadian Rugby Championship.

== Recreation ==
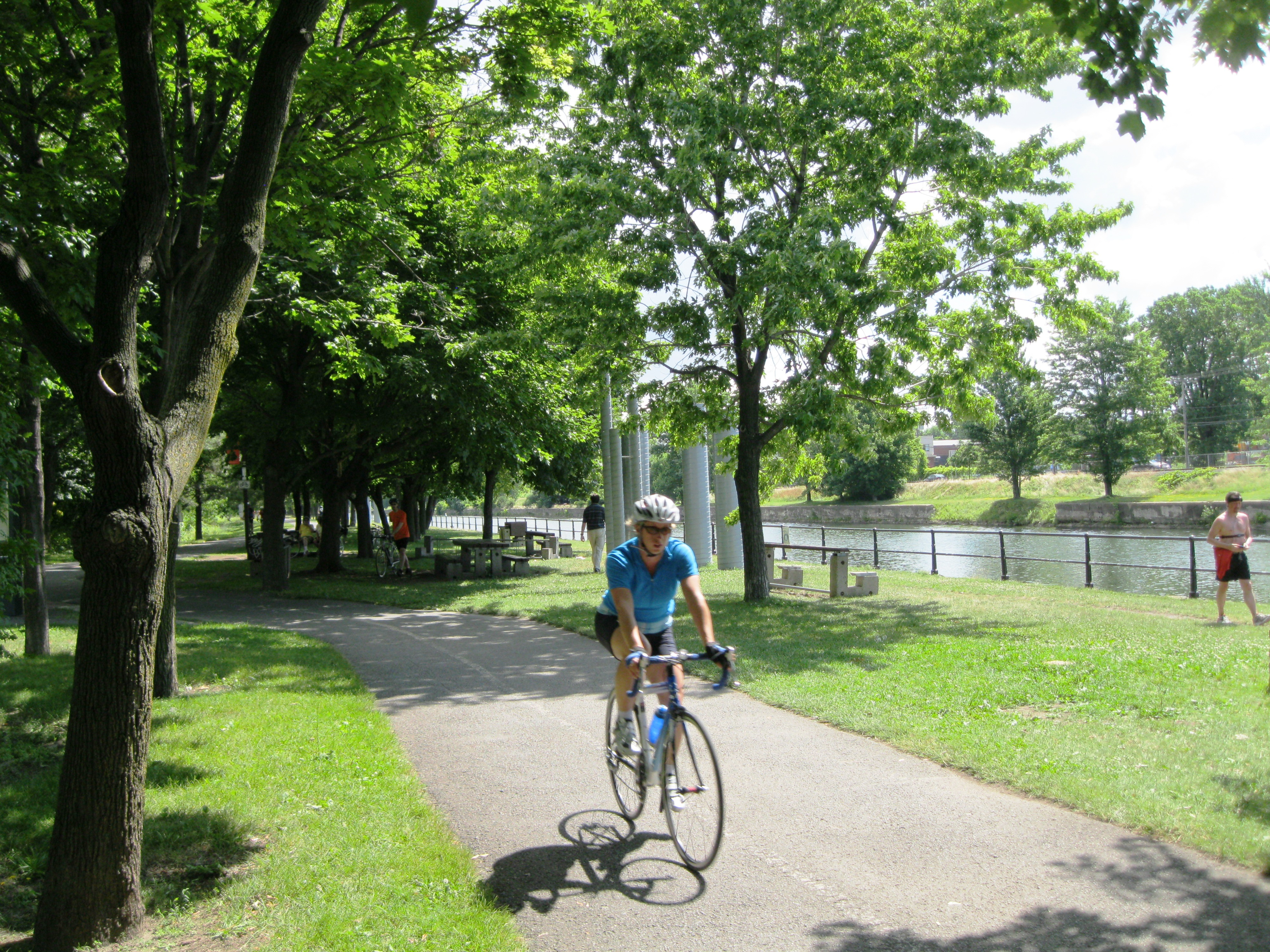
A cyclist near the Lachine Canal

Montreal has a well-developed network of bicycle paths. Bike rentals are available at the Old Port of Montreal, as well as quadricycles, inline skates, children trailers, and Segways. In addition to a network of parks that include le Parc du Mont-Royal, on the mountain's side, Montreal offers five beaches around the island for recreational activities: Cap St. Jacques Nature Park, Bois-de-L’Ile Bizard Nature Park, Jean Drapeau Park Beach, Pointe Calumet Beach Club and Oka Beach. The Quebec Ministry of Environment tests the beaches for pollutants, on a scale from “A” to “D”.

Bandy Quebec seeks to promote bandy in Montreal. There has been an introduction. No teams exist yet.

== Sporting events ==
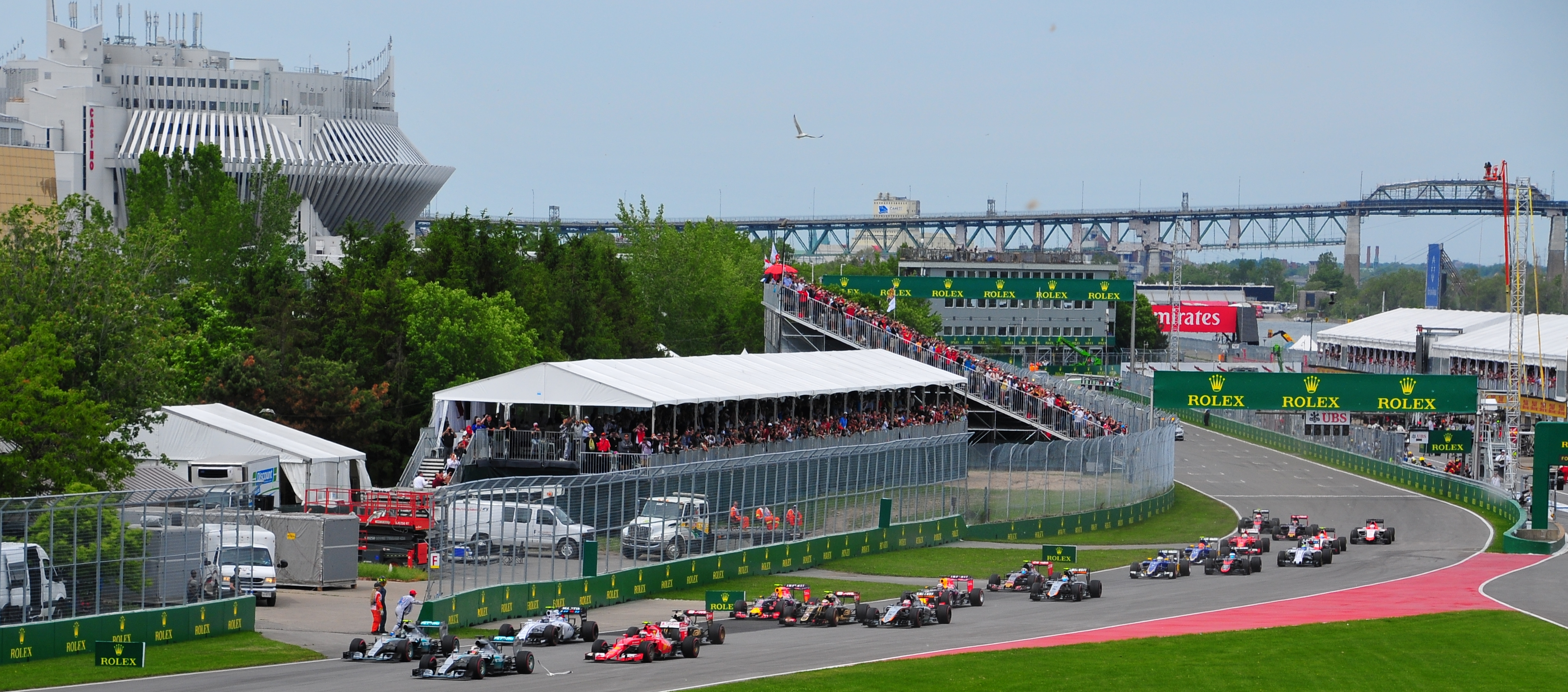
Opening lap for the 2015 Canadian Grand Prix. The Canadian Grand Prix has been held in Montreal since 1978.

Montreal is host to the Formula 1 Canadian Grand Prix, which takes place at the Circuit Gilles Villeneuve on Île Notre-Dame. The race has a contract until the 2031 season. Of the 300,000 spectators at the F1 race, 25 percent are from outside of Quebec. The Formula One event is responsible for $84 million in economic benefits and the province will collect more than $9 million in additional tax revenues every year because of the race. Former races to take place at the track included the NAPA Auto Parts 200 (NASCAR Nationwide Series), the Montreal 200 (Grand Am Rolex Sports Car Series) and the Molson Indy Montreal / Grand Prix of Montreal (Champ Car).

In golf, the Royal Montreal Golf Club on Île Bizard has been an occasional venue for the Canadian Open on the PGA Tour, most recently in 2001. The Montreal Championship, an event on PGA Tour Champions for golfers 50 and older, was launched in 2010 and is hosted by Club de Golf Fontainebleu in the suburb of Blainville.

Montreal has hosted several international soccer tournaments, including some games for the 2007 FIFA U-20 World Cup and the 2015 FIFA Women's World Cup.

The Canada Masters, currently sponsored as the Rogers Cup, is an annual tennis tournament held in Montreal and Toronto. The men's competition is an ATP Masters Series event on the Association of Tennis Professionals (ATP) tour. The women's competition is a Tier 1 event on the Women's Tennis Association (WTA) tour. The two competitions are currently held in separate weeks in the July–August period. The events alternate from year-to-year between the cities of Montreal and Toronto. In odd-numbered years, the men's tournament is held in Montreal, while the women's tournament is held in Toronto, and vice versa in even-numbered years. The competition is played on hard courts.

In cycling, the Grand Prix Cycliste de Montréal has been held on city streets since 2010, using the steep slopes of Mount Royal. The circuit is similar to that at the 1976 Summer Olympics, the Grand Prix des Amériques and the 1974 UCI Road World Championships. In 2026, Montreal will host the UCI Road World Championships for the second time, having previously hosted in 1974. Montreal's Olympic Stadium previously played host to the 1979 IAAF World Cup.

Montreal has also hosted multiple professional wrestling events, most notably the WWE Survivor Series on November 9, 1997, where the infamous Montreal Screwjob took place. The WWE’s annual Draft event took place in Montreal in 2019 (called the Superstar Shake-Up at the time), which made Montreal the very first city outside of the United States to host the event.

In July 2005 Montreal hosted the 11th FINA World Aquatics Championships. It has also hosted the 2002 FINA World Junior Synchronised Swimming Championships, the 2022 FINA World Junior Diving Championships, the 2026 World Aquatics Diving World Cup, and served at a venue during various FINA Diving World Series.

Montreal hosted the ICF Flatwater Racing World Championships in 1986.

=== Multi-sport events ===
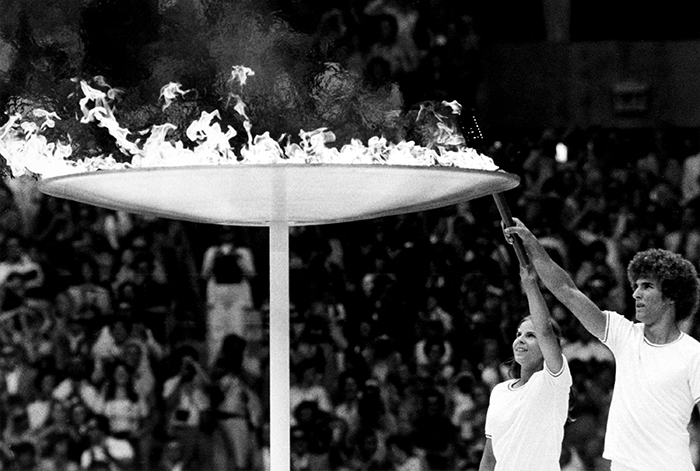
The Olympic flame is lit for the 1976 Summer Olympics in Montreal

The most important sporting event in Montreal's history was when Montreal played host to the 1976 Summer Olympics.

The city previously attempted to host the 1954 British Empire and Commonwealth Games, losing to Vancouver.

In 2006, Montreal hosted the 2006 World Outgames, the first-ever GLISA World Outgames. Over 16,000 LGBT athletes took part, in the largest international event in the city of Montreal since the 1976 Olympics.

== Organizations ==
Ethnosport World Society is based in Montreal.

=== Sports media ===
Montreal has one all-sport radio station, the English-language CKGM (TSN 690). Sport is covered daily in the city's newspapers by beat writers in The Montreal Gazette, La Presse, Le Journal de Montréal and Le Devoir. The French-language cable television channel, Réseau des Sports (RDS) focuses much of its coverage on Montreal-based sport clubs and events, however also features standard North American sports programming much like its Toronto-based English-language sister station, The Sports Network (TSN).

== Major sports venues ==
| Venue | Capacity | Team/Tournament/Attraction |
|---|---|---|
| Gilles Villeneuve Circuit | 100,000 | Canadian Grand Prix |
| Olympic Stadium | 65,255 | Montreal Alouettes (playoff games); Montreal Marathon; NAPA Motocross; CF Montréal (select games) |
| Molson Stadium | 25,012 | Montreal Alouettes; McGill Redmen Football |
| Hippodrome de Montréal | 25,000 | Horse Racing |
| Bell Centre | 21,273 | Montreal Canadiens |
| Île Sainte-Hélène Aquatic Complex | | XI Fina World Championships |
| Saputo Stadium | 20,341 | CF Montréal; FC Montreal |
| IGA Stadium | 12,000 | Rogers Cup; Beach Volley World Tour |
| Complexe sportif Claude-Robillard | 9,500 | Défi sportif; Montreal Royal |
| CEPSUM Stadium | 5,100 | Montreal Carabins |

=== List of sports teams ===
Active professional sports teams in Montreal
| Club | League | Sport | Venue | Established | Championships |
|---|---|---|---|---|---|
| Montreal Canadiens | NHL | Ice hockey | Bell Centre | 1909 | 24 |
| Montréal Victoire | PWHL | Ice hockey | Place Bell | 2024 | 1 |
| Laval Rocket | AHL | Ice hockey | Place Bell | 2017 | 0 |
| Trois-Rivières Lions | ECHL | Ice hockey | Colisée Vidéotron | 2021 | 1 |
| Montreal Alouettes | CFL | Football | Percival Molson Memorial Stadium; Olympic Stadium | 1946 | 8 |
| CF Montréal | MLS | Soccer | Saputo Stadium | 1993 | 3* |
| Blainville-Boisbriand Armada | QMJHL | Ice hockey | Centre d'Excellence Sports Rousseau | 2011 | 0 |
| Montreal Royal | UFA | Ultimate | Claude-Robillard Sports Complex | 2014 | 0 |
| Montreal Alliance | CEBL | Basketball | Verdun Auditorium | 2022 | 0 |
| Montreal Roses FC | NSL | Soccer | Centre Sportif Bois-de-Boulogne | 2025 | 0 |
| FC Supra du Québec | CPL | Soccer | Centre Sportif Bois-de-Boulogne | 2026 | 0 |

Defunct sports teams in Montreal
| Club | League | Venue | Years | Championships |
|---|---|---|---|---|
| Montreal Force | Premier Hockey Federation | Multiple | 2022 | 0 |
| FC Montreal | United Soccer League | Complexe sportif Claude-Robillard | 2015–2016 | 0 |
| Montreal Jazz | NBL Canada | Centre Pierre Charbonneau | 2012–2013 | 0 |
| Montreal Expos | Major League Baseball | Olympic Stadium | 1969–2004 | 0 |
| Montreal Impact | North American Soccer League | Saputo Stadium | 1992–2011 | 3 |
| Montreal Royals | International League | Delorimier Stadium | 1929–1960 | 2 |
| Montreal Junior Hockey Club | Quebec Major Junior Hockey League | Verdun Auditorium | 2008–2011 | 0 |
| Montreal Dragons | National Basketball League | Verdun Auditorium | 1993–1994 | 0 |
| Montreal Matrix | American Basketball Association | Centre Pierre Charbonneau | 2005–2008 | 0 |
| Montreal Sasquatch | Premier Basketball League | Centre Pierre Charbonneau | 2008–2009 | 0 |
| Montreal Machine | World League of American Football | | 1991–1992 | 0 |
| Montreal Concordes | Canadian Football League | Olympic Stadium | 1982–1985; 1986 as the Montreal Alouettes | 0 |
| Montreal Rocket | Quebec Major Junior Hockey League | Bell Centre Maurice Richard Arena | 1999–2003 | 0 |
| Montreal Roadrunners | Roller Hockey International | Montreal Forum | 1994–1995 | 0 |
| Montreal Roadrunners | Roller Hockey International | Molson Centre | 1996–1997 | 0 |
| Montreal Voyageurs | American Hockey League | | 1969–1971 | 0 |
| Montreal Maroons | National Hockey League | Montreal Forum | 1924–1938 | 2 |
| Montreal Wanderers | National Hockey League | | 1903–1918 | 7 |
| Montreal Shamrocks | Amateur Hockey Association | | 1896–1898 | 2 |
| Montreal Shamrocks | Canadian Amateur Hockey League | | 1898–1905 | 2 |
| Montreal Shamrocks | Eastern Canada Amateur Hockey Association | | 1905–1909 | 2 |
| Montreal Shamrocks | Canadian Hockey Association | | 1909–1910 | 2 |
| Montreal Shamrocks | National Hockey Association | | 1909–1910 | 2 |
| Montreal Express | National Lacrosse League | Bell Centre | 2001–2002 | 0 |
| Montreal Supra | Canadian Soccer League | | 1988–1992 | 0 |
| Montreal Manic | North American Soccer League | Olympic Stadium | 1981–1983 | 0 |
| Montreal Axion | National Women's Hockey League | Centre Étienne Desmarteau | 1998–2007 | 1 |
| Montreal Jofa Titan | National Women's Hockey League | Ed Meagher Arena on Concordia University campus | 1998–99 | 0 |
