= Wisner Stadium =

Stadium in Pontiac, Michigan

- Wisner Memorial Stadium
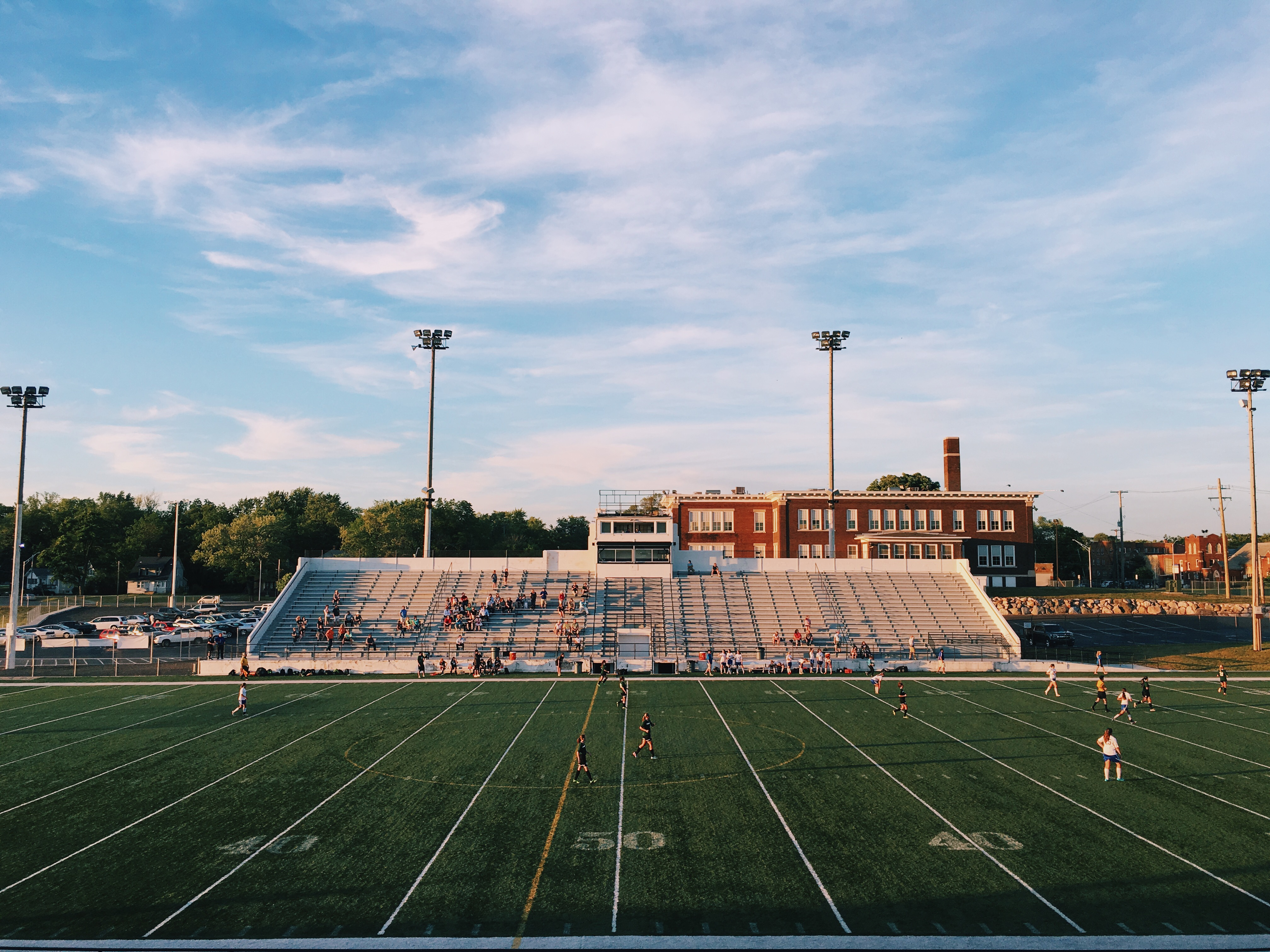
- Interactive map of Wisner Stadium
- Location: 441 Cesar E Chavez Ave, Pontiac, Michigan 48342
- Coordinates: 42.6483°N 83.3068°W
- Capacity: 6,600
- Surface: FieldTurf

Construction
- Built: 1941

Tenants
- Michigan Stars FC; Our Lady of the Lakes Catholic School; Pontiac High School

Wisner Memorial Stadium is an athletic facility located in Pontiac, Michigan.

== History ==
Wisner Memorial Stadium was built in 1941 and named for Moses Wisner, the 12th Governor of the State of Michigan. Wisner, a resident of Pontiac, was a lawyer who became active in the anti-slavery movement. The Governor Moses Wisner House is located on property adjacent to the stadium.

The stadium seats 6,600 and has hosted many different events over the years. The football field was home to both public high schools in the city, Pontiac Northern High School and Pontiac Central High School, and is now home to the consolidated Pontiac High School Phoenix football team. Pontiac High School, which is located at the former Pontiac Northern High School, was created in 2009 by the merger of both Pontiac Northern and Pontiac Central high schools.

Wisner Stadium was one of the practice locations for the Detroit Lions and George Plimpton in 1963, as he was writing his book Paper Lion.

In 1974, the stadium hosted the Wide Track Summer Festival, sponsored by local Detroit radio station WABX. Acts included headliners Leon Russell and The Gap Band, along with special guests Kansas, Fresh Start, and Mary McCreary.

In 1994, the stadium served as the home for the Detroit Wheels soccer team of the USISL.

During Super Bowl XL week, the Pittsburgh Steelers used the vacant Pontiac Silverdome as a practice facility. FieldTurf was installed specifically for the practices, rather than using the artificial turf that was previously used. Following the game, the new playing surface was donated to Wisner Stadium by FieldTurf.

The stadium has been restored in recent years by nearby business Lee Industrial Contracting. The company leased the stadium, the 35,000-square-foot Wisner School, and 21-acre property from the Pontiac School District on a 10-year contract in 2013.

== Current use ==
This is Oakland County's largest high school football stadium in terms of seating capacity.

In 2015, Michigan Stars FC began playing at the stadium.

In 2016, the Our Lady of the Lakes Catholic School varsity football team made Wisner Stadium their home field.
