= Great Lakes Royals =

- League: BSL
- Founded: 2026
- Arena: Soaring Eagle Casino
- Location: Mount Pleasant, Michigan
- Team colours: Purple, Gold,
- Head coach: Keno Davis
- Ownership: Kelly & Joe Garety
- Website: https://greatlakesroyals.pplx.app/

The Great Lakes Royals are a professional basketball team based in Mount Pleasant, Michigan that competes in the Basketball Super League (BSL) playing home games out of Soaring Eagle Casino. the team is scheduled to begin play in the 2026-27 BSL season

== History ==
The team was originally founded as the Saginaw Soul on April 10 2025 based in nearby Saginaw, Michigan, becoming the first ever BSL expansion team to not originally hail from The Basketball League, however after facing numerous difficulties including struggles to find a home arena and issues with the leagues structure and stability, the team announced on September 23 that the team would postpone its inaugural season until the 2026-27 BSL campaign.

On July 14 2026 it was announced the Soul would be relocating to Mount Pleasant and rebranded as the Great Lakes Royals
