= Pontiac Pharaohs =

- League: The Basketball League 2021-2024; BSL: 2024–present
- Founded: 2021
- History: Lansing Pharaohs; 2021-2022; Pontiac Pharaohs; 2024–present
- Arena: Pontiac High School
- Location: Pontiac, Michigan
- Team colors: Purple, gold, black
- Head coach: Scott Newman
- Ownership: Chris Jackson
- Website: Official website

The Pontiac Pharaohs are an American professional basketball team based out of Pontiac, Michigan, and a member of the Basketball Super League (BSL).

== History ==
It was announced that Lansing, Michigan would be awarded a franchise for the upcoming 2022 TBL season. The team is owned by entrepreneur Chris Jackson. Scott Newman was announced as the team's head coach. Previously he served as the assistant coach of Windsor Express.

On November 6, 2022 the team announced it would move to Oakland County, Michigan, sit out 2023 and be renamed as the Oakland County Pharaohs in 2024. On June 12, 2023 it was announced that the team will compete in Pontiac, Michigan for the 2024 season.

On August 13, 2024 it was announced that the team would be joining the Basketball Super League (BSL) for the 2024-25 season.
