= Basketball Super League (North America) =

North American basketball league

- Sport: Basketball
- Founded: 2023; 3 years ago
- First season: 2023–24
- Owners: Dave Magley; Evelyn Magley
- CEO: Evelyn Magley
- President: Dave Magley
- Commissioner: Devin Kinsella
- No. of teams: 4
- Countries: Canada; United States
- Continents: North America
- Most recent champion: Sudbury Five (2nd title)
- Most titles: Sudbury Five (2)
- Broadcasters: BeIN Sports Xtra; BSL TV
- Website: basketballsuperleague.com

The Basketball Super League (BSL) is a professional basketball league in Canada and the United States that was formed in 2023.

It was started by the ownership of The Basketball League (TBL) after the National Basketball League of Canada (NBLC) dissolved and left several Canadian teams without a home.

BSL teams engage in interleague play with TBL franchises, and their regular season runs from November through March.

== History ==
For their 2021–22 season, the National Basketball League of Canada (NBLC) announced that they had agreed to interleague play with several teams from The Basketball League (TBL). On June 18, 2022, the NBLC announced that Dave Magley, president of TBL, would work alongside NBLC commissioner Audley Stephenson in overseeing the growth of both leagues.

After the dissolution of NBLC following their 2022–23 season, Dave Magley announced the formation of the Basketball Super League (BSL) to begin play in December 2023. BSL teams have no salary cap and play in venues with a minimum capacity of 2,500, unlike TBL teams which have a salary cap and play in smaller venues.

In April 2023, the Newfoundland Rogues of the TBL were announced as the first BSL franchise. The KW Titans, London Lightning and Sudbury Five of the defunct NBLC joined in May 2023. The Quebec Pioneers were originally announced as the fifth team in June 2023, but folded before the season began. The Windsor Express, another former NBLC franchise, announced in August 2023 that they would also join the league. Montréal Toundra, formerly of the TBL, rounded out the inaugural 2023–24 BSL season's six teams.

BSL's six teams engaged in interleague play with TBL franchises in addition to their intraleague games, and the top four teams were awarded a playoff berth. The London Lightning defeated the KW Titans 3–1 in their May 2024 finals series to become inaugural BSL champions.

Devin Kinsella was appointed as the league's first commissioner in August 2024.

American teams from TBL joined the BSL for its 2024–25 season, including the Glass City Wranglers, Jamestown Jackals, and Pontiac Pharaohs. The Montréal Toundra announced it was taking a hiatus from the league in November 2024.

The Saginaw Soul were announced as an expansion franchise for the 2025–26 season in April 2025, but announced in September 2025 they will delay joining the league until 2026.

In early October 2025, the London Lightning announced that they will not be participating in the 2025-26 season.

== Teams ==
Current teams

Team	City	Arena	Capacity	Founded	Joined	Head coach
Lake Erie Jackals	Edinboro, Pennsylvania	Edinboro University	3,500	2016	2024	Raheem Singleton
Lebanon Leprechauns	Lebanon, Indiana	Farmers Bank Fieldhouse.	1,000	2021	2026	
Komoko Fireflies	Komoko, Indiana	Memorial Gymnasium	5,200	2020	2026	
Newfoundland Rogues	St.John's Newfoundland	Mary Brown's Center	7,000	2021	2026	
Sudbury Five	Greater Sudbury, Ontario	Sudbury Community Arena	5,000	2018	2023	Joey Puddister
Windsor Express	Windsor, Ontario	WFCU Centre	6,900	2012	2023	Bill Jones

=== Former teams ===
Former teams in Basketball Super League
Team	City	Arena	Seasons	Notes
Glass City Wranglers	Toledo, Ohio	Maumee Valley Country Day School	2024	Joined from The Basketball League, returned to the TBL following 2024 season
Saginaw Soul	Saginaw, Michigan	Buena Vista High School		Announced as expansion team for 2025-26 season, postponed launch to 2026-27 due to issues with league structure and stability, relocated to Mt. Pleasant as Great Lakes Royals before playing a game
Pontiac Pharoahs	Pontiac, Michigan	Pontiac High School	2024	Joined from The Basketball League, played 2nd half of season as travel team due to venue issues, folded after 2024 season
Québec Pioneers	Québec City, Québec			Announced as participating in 2023–24, but folded prior to season starting.
KW Titans	Kitchener, Ontario	Kitchener Memorial Auditorium	2016-2026	Announced that they would be leaving the league and bid to join the Canadian Elite Basketball League in 2027.
London Lightning	London, Ontario	Canada Life Place	2011-2025	The team called it quits and announced that it had “no league to play in” in October 3rd 2025.
Montreal Tundra	Montreal, Quebec	Centre Pierre Charbonneau	2023, 2025	Joined from The Basketball League.Participated in inaugural 2023 season before taking leave of absence, returned in 2025. Folded after 2025 season
Great Lakes Royals	Mount Pleasant, Michigan	Soaring Eagle Casino and Resort	N/A	Announced as a relocation of the dormant Saginaw Soul franchise for 2026 season. Folded prior to season starting

== Seasons ==
Overview of Basketball Super League seasons
Season	Regular season champion	Regular season MVP	Playoff champion	Playoff runner-up	Playoff MVP
2023–24	KW Titans	Armani Chaney (Newfoundland)	London Lightning	KW Titans	Chris Jones (London)
2024–25	Sudbury Five	Latin Davis (Windsor)	Sudbury Five	Windsor Express	JD Miller (Sudbury)
2025–26	KW Titans	Charlie Marquardt (Sudbury)	Sudbury Five	KW Titans	Duane Notice (Sudbury)

== Media coverage ==
All games stream live on the league's BSL TV subscription website, with many games simulcast for free on BeIN Sports Xtra.
