= Webster School =

Webster School may refer to: (sorted by state, then city/town)

- Webster School (Waterbury, Connecticut), listed on the National Register of Historic Places (NRHP) in New Haven County, Connecticut
- Webster Grammar School, Auburn, Maine, listed on the NRHP in Androscoggin County, Maine
- Elmer R. Webster School, Pontiac, Michigan
- Webster School (Kansas City, Missouri), listed on the NRHP in Jackson County, Missouri
- Webster School (Magna, Utah), listed on the NRHP in Salt Lake County, Utah
- Webster School (Washington, D.C.), local historic landmark
