= Montréal Toundra =

Canadian professional basketball team

- League: The Basketball League 2023; BSL: 2023–Present
- Founded: 2022
- History: Montreal Tundra/Toundra de Montréal; 2023–Present
- Arena: Centre Pierre Charbonneau
- Location: Montreal, Quebec, Canada
- Team colours
- President: Denis Coderre
- General manager: Juan Mendez
- Head coach: Damian Buckley
- Website: mtltoundra.com

The Montréal Toundra (French: La Toundra de Montréal) are a Canadian professional basketball team based in Montreal, Quebec. Founded in 2022, the team competes in The Basketball Super League (BSL) and play their home games at the Centre Pierre Charbonneau. It played its first game on March 4, 2023, a 121-117 win over the Virginia Valley Vipers.

On Nov 1, 2024, the team announced through social media that they would withdraw for the 2024–25 BSL season due to apparent disagreements with the league. They stated an intent to return for the 2025–26 season. On November 28, 2025, the team announced their return to the Basketball Super League starting in January 2026.

== Background ==
Prior to 2021, the most recent professional basketball team in Montreal was in 2012 when the National Basketball League of Canada (NBLC) added the Montreal Jazz as an expansion team. The team did not play in the 2013–14 NBL Canada season after failing to secure a new ownership group. Since 2021, the city of Montreal has also been home to the Montreal Alliance of the Canadian Elite Basketball League.

== Formation ==
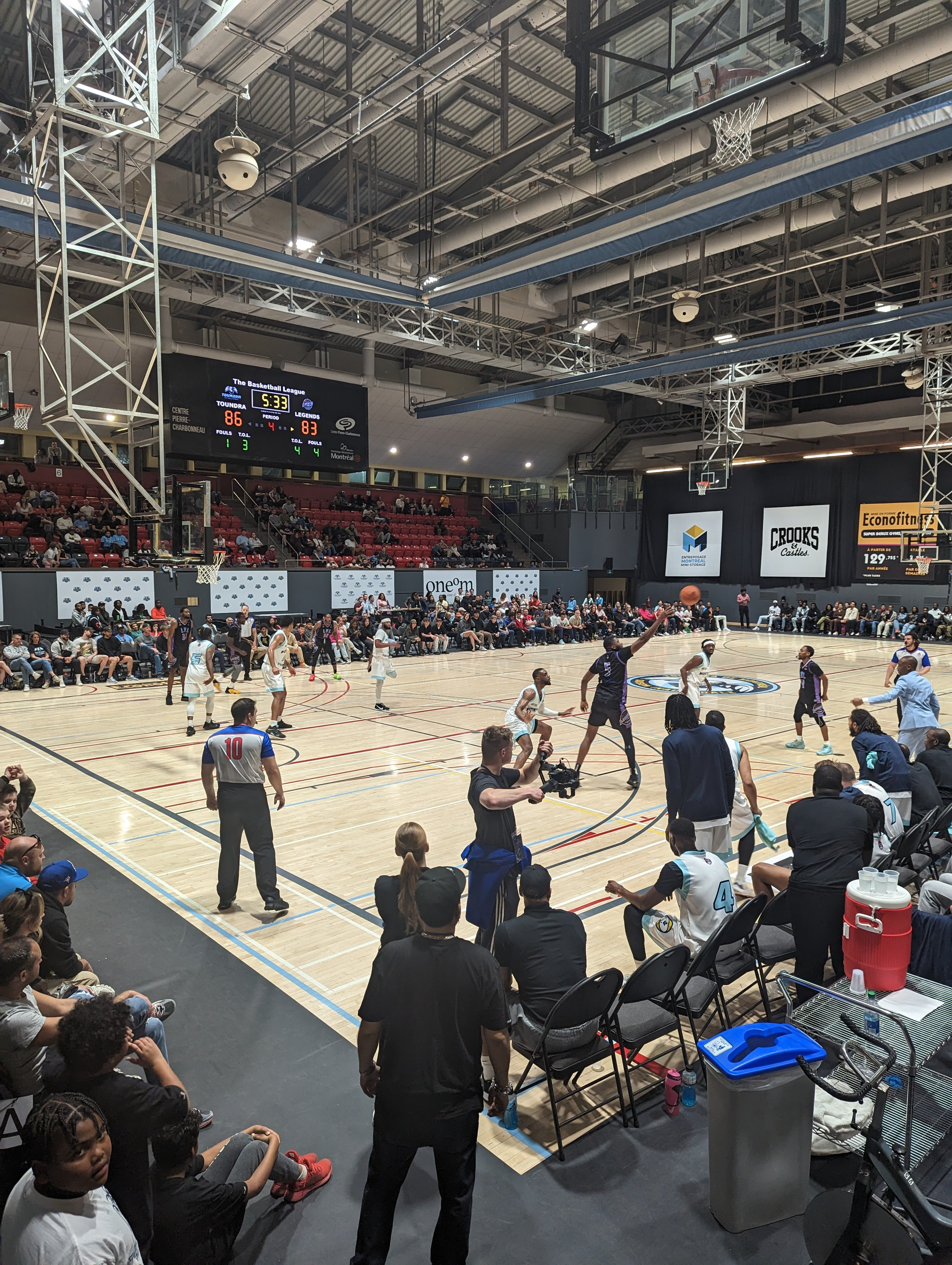
TBL game between the Montreal Tundra and Lehigh Valley Legends at Centre Pierre Charbonneau, April 2023

On June 18, 2022, the NBLC announced that TBL President David Magley, a former NBL Commissioner, will work alongside Audley Stephenson, the current NBLC Commissioner, in overseeing the growth of both leagues.

The league announced that Montreal was approved as a basketball franchise for the upcoming 2023 season. On October 5, 2022, a group of local investors fronted by Canadian basketball player Juan Mendez announced that they had launched a new, Montreal-based professional team that will play in TBL. As a result, of the previous additions of the Newfoundland Rogues and L'Academie D'Alma, the TBL will have three Canadian teams for the 2023 season.

On December 8, 2022, the team name was revealed as the Montreal Tundra/Toundra de Montréal and Igor Rwigema announced as its head coach. The team has since been re-positioned as the Montréal Toundra or Toundra de Montréal.
