= School District of the City of Pontiac =

School district

Address
- 47200 Woodward Ave. Pontiac, Michigan Pontiac, Oakland, Michigan, 48342

District information
- Type: Public
- Grades: PK – 12
- Superintendent: Kelly Williams
- Schools: 10 schools, 1 high, 1 middle, 5 elementary, 3 academies
- Budget: $139,658 2022-2023 expenditures
- NCES District ID: 2628740

Students and staff
- Students: 3,851 (2024-2025)
- Teachers: 241.35 (on an FTE basis) (2024-2025)
- Staff: 712.68 FTE (2024-2025)
- Student–teacher ratio: 15.96 (2024-2025)

Other information
- Website: www.pontiac.k12.mi.us

The School District of the City of Pontiac (also known as the Pontiac School District) is a public school district in Metro Detroit in the U.S. state of Michigan, serving Pontiac, most of Auburn Hills, Lake Angelus and Sylvan Lake, and small portions of Bloomfield Township, Orion Township, Waterford, and West Bloomfield.

== History ==
The village of Pontiac had a school as early as 1822. A union school was built in 1850, but for unknown reasons there was no graduating class until 1867. A dedicated high school was built in 1871 on the site of the later Pontiac Central High School. Central School (not to be confused with Central High School) replaced the Union School in 1893. A new high school was built in 1914 on the same site of the 1871 high school.

The Chicago firm of Perkins, Fellows and Hamilton designed the 1914 high school for Pontiac. Another design of theirs was the Webster School, opened in 1921 at 640 West Huron Street.

By 1960, Pontiac had two high schools--Central and Northern--and over 80,000 residents. The school district used high salaries to recruit teachers as the automobile industry economy prospered.

A February 1970 court order from federal judge Damon J. Keith ordered racial integration effective fall 1970 to ameliorate de facto racial segregation. According to the court order, no more than 40% of each school was to be African-American. The busing was to affect 10,000 students. In August 1971 several school buses were bombed with dynamite, and ten men were indicted in charges related to the incidents; one of them was an ex-Ku Klux Klan Grand Dragon in the state. On October 25, 1971 the U.S. Supreme Court decided not to hear an opposition to the court order, keeping it in effect.

The busing order contributed to area racial tensions. That, along with an increase in unemployment, a loss of political support for school taxation due to an increase of the average age of the residents, financially harmed the district. As of 1981 20% of the area's residents were 65 and older, and a total of 58% of the community residents were at least 46 years of age; residents voted down tax millage proposals on eight occasions during the years 1979 to 1981. There was a 23% unemployment rate as of 1981. From 1972 to circa 1982 the enrollment declined from 21,028 to 17,216. In 1981 extracurricular activities were sharply reduced, and several athletes left the district due to the loss of athletic programs; they attended public schools in other school districts and private schools.

Pontiac's population declined between the 1970 Census and the 2010 Census. The school district's enrollment reflected this decline, having 12,473 students in the 1999-2000 school year and 8,692 in 2008. By December 2008, administrators were making plans to consolidate Pontiac Northern and Central high schools. In 2009, the district faced a $10 million deficit, and eight schools were closed in summer 2009.

In June 2013 the Michigan Education Association's health insurance division stated that it was owed $11 million in premiums from the Pontiac district, so it planned to end benefits for teachers of the district on July 31 of that year; according to a lawsuit settlement, taxpayers in the district were required to pay $7.8 million of it. Administrators, secretaries, and teachers had been paying over 20% of their health care premiums out of pocket.

On Wednesday July 3, 2013 the state of Michigan conducted a preliminary review of the district, and the result was an indication of "probable financial stress". Governor of Michigan Rick Snyder stated that he was going to have a full review of the district conducted by a team appointed by him.

The 2017-2018 school year saw an increase in enrollment for the first time in many years, but enrollment was only about 34 percent what it was in 1999. Voters in the district passed a $147 million bond issue in 2020, and the 2023-2024 school year saw another rise in enrollment.

The 2025 Board of Education consists of - Dr. Anisha Hannah - President, Kenyada Bowman - Vice-President, Tanisha Miller - Trustee, Marcus Terry - Treasurer, ShaQuana Davis-Smith - Secretary and G. Kevin Gross - Trustee. Kelley Williams is the Superintendent.

== Demographics ==
In 1971 the district had 24,000 students, with 32% of them being black. In 1972-1973 there were 21,028. In the 1980-1981 school year the student body numbered 18,099. This declined to 17,216 students in 1982, with 27% of the students receiving welfare and a total of 37% of students qualifying for free or reduced lunches, a sign of poverty. A principal of an elementary school, Mattie McKinney, stated to the Associated Press that, in the agency's words, "The district's poverty is unusually striking this school year", and she directly stated that she had encountered more poverty in her students than she had previously. The district enrollment was projected to further decrease after 1982.

== School uniform ==
Some schools in the city are required to wear school uniforms. The school board considered adding uniforms in 2009.

== Schools ==
List of Schools in the School District of the City of Pontiac
School	Address	Year built	Notes
Alcott Elementary	460 W. Kennett Rd., Pontiac		
Central School	101 E. Pike, Pontiac	1893	closed
Crofoot Elementary	250 W. Pike, Pontiac	1971	closed 2009, became Pontiac Transportation Museum
Emerson Elementary	859 Emerson St., Pontiac	1949	closed 2009
Franklin Elementary	661 Franklin Rd., Pontiac	1957	closed 2009
Herrington Elementary	541 Bay St., Pontiac		
Jefferson-Whittier Elementary	600 Motor St., Pontiac		originally a junior high school, closed summer 2012.
Kennedy School	1700 Baldwin, Pontiac		closing with Owen elementary
LeBaron Elementary	1033 Barkell, Pontiac	1944	closed 2009
Lincoln Middle School	131 Hillside, Pontiac		closed 2009
Longfellow Elementary	31 N. Astor St., Pontiac		closed 2009
Owen Elementary	43 E. Columbia, Pontiac		plans to be closed
Peace Academy	723 Cottage Street, Pontiac		
Pontiac Central High School	300 W. Huron St., Pontiac	1972	closed
Pontiac Middle School	1275 N. Perry St., Pontiac	1956	Formerly Madison Middle School
Pontiac Northern High School	1051 Arlene St., Pontiac	1958	Merged with Central High School in 2009 to become Pontiac High School.
Rogers Elementary	2600 Dexter, Auburn Hills	1957	
Twain Elementary	729 Linda Vista, Pontiac		closed
Walt Whitman Elementary	125 Montcalm St., Pontiac		
Washington Middle School	710 Menominee, Pontiac		closed 2006
Webster Elementary	640 W. Huron St., Pontiac	1921	closed, being redeveloped as a community center
Whitfield Elementary	2000 Orchard Lake Rd., Sylvan Lake	1927	closed June 1991, demolished 2003
Whitmer Human Resource Center	60 Parkhurst, Pontiac	1971	A multipurpose building, houses International Language Academy and International Tech Academy.

== See also ==
- List of school districts in Michigan
