= Igor Rwigema =

Congolese-Canadian basketball coach

Igor Rwigema is a Congolese-Canadian basketball coach.

Originally from Kinshasa, Democratic Republic of the Congo, Rwigema emigrated to Quebec and resides in Gatineau. He established a basketball program at Collège d'Alma in Alma, Quebec before moving it to Cégep de Thetford in Thetford Mines, Quebec. The program helped develop future NBA player Chris Boucher among other high-level professional and university-level players such as Tidjan Keita.

In 2020, filmmakers Aude Leroux-Lévesque and Sébastien Rist premiered a documentary about Rwigema and the Thetford academy team entitled "L'Academie."

In March 2022, Rwigema returned to basketball after undergoing treatment to deal with colon cancer.

In December 2022, Rwigema was introduced as the first head coach of the Montreal Tundra, a new The Basketball League team set to begin play in March 2023.
