= Chris Boucher (basketball) =

Saint Lucian-Canadian basketball player (born 1993)

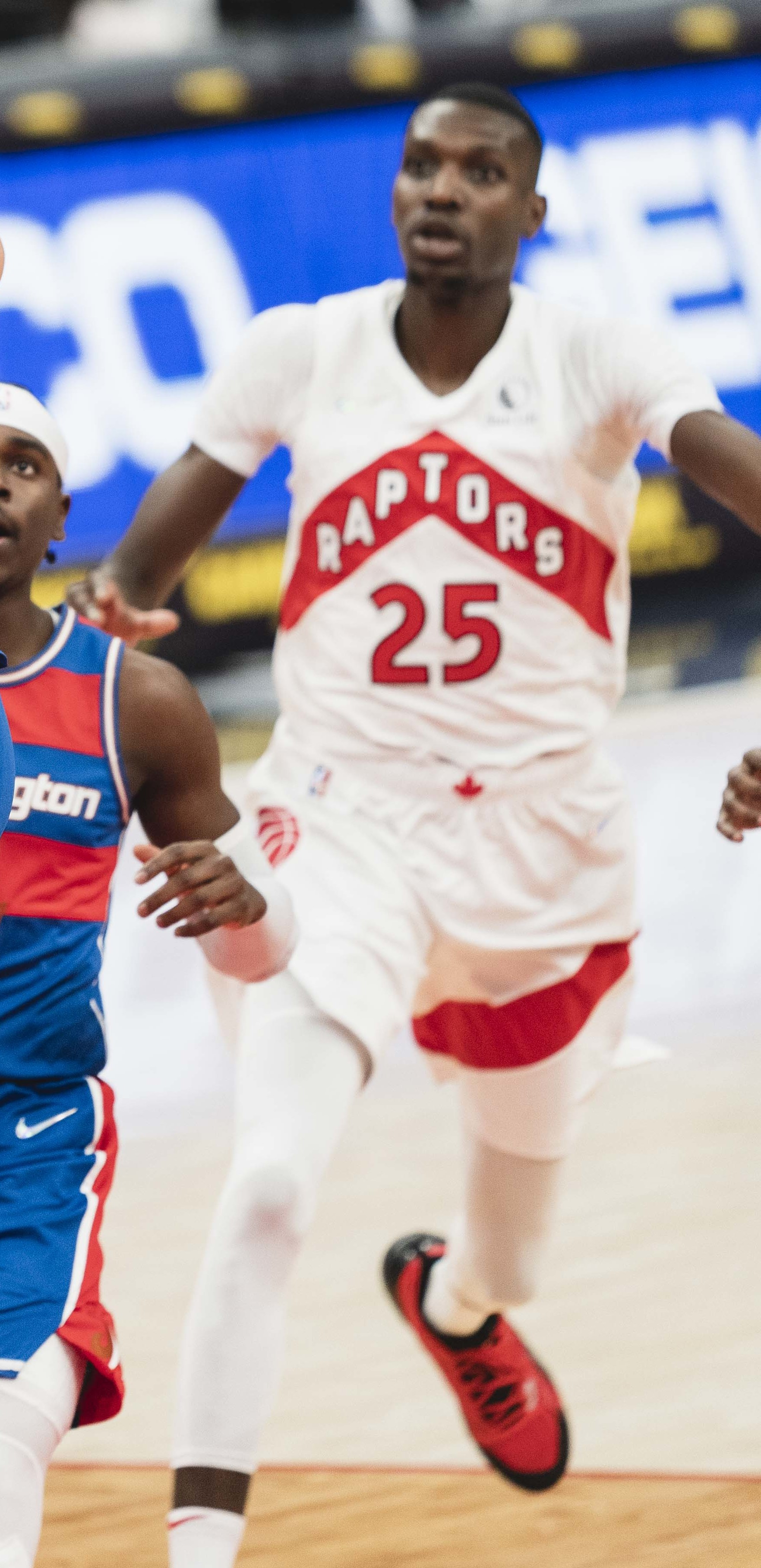
- Boucher with the Toronto Raptors in 2021

Free agent
- Position: Power forward

Personal information
- Born: January 11, 1993 (age 33) Castries, Saint Lucia
- Listed height: 6 ft 8 in (2.03 m)
- Listed weight: 200 lb (91 kg)

Career information
- High school: La Voie High School; Damase Boulanger (Alma, Quebec)
- College: New Mexico JC (2013–2014); Northwest (2014–2015); Oregon (2015–2017)
- NBA draft: 2017: undrafted
- Playing career: 2017–present

Career history
- 2017–2018: Golden State Warriors
- 2017–2018: →Santa Cruz Warriors
- 2018–2025: Toronto Raptors
- 2018–2019: →Raptors 905
- 2025–2026: Boston Celtics

Career highlights
- 2× NBA champion (2018, 2019); NBA G League Most Valuable Player (2019); NBA G League Defensive Player of the Year (2019); All-NBA G League Team (2019)
- Stats at NBA.com
- Stats at Basketball Reference

Christopher Boucher (born January 11, 1993) is a Saint Lucian-Canadian professional basketball player who last played for the Boston Celtics of the National Basketball Association (NBA). Born in Saint Lucia, he played college basketball for the Oregon Ducks.

== Early life ==
Boucher was born in Castries, Saint Lucia. He moved with his mother, Mary McVane, to Montreal when he was five years old to see his Canadian father, Jean-Guy Boucher. However, his parents split up when he was young and Boucher had a poor relationship with his father. He grew up playing soccer and ice hockey but lived in poverty in the Montréal-Nord neighbourhood. He dropped out of high school at age 16 and worked as a cook and dishwasher in a St-Hubert restaurant. During the winter months, Boucher would sleep on the city bus. In 2012, he was offered a spot on a tournament basketball team, and scored 44 points in the tournament final. Boucher, who previously only played pickup basketball, was offered a spot on Amateur Athletic Union AAU team Alma Academy by coaches Igor Rwigema and Ibrahim Willson. He accepted a spot at the Academy, which was created to help inner-city teenagers with few future prospects, to earn a high school diploma. In a game versus New Jersey's Blair Academy, Boucher scored 29 points and 12 rebounds, attracting the interest of Division I college coaches.

== College career ==
Boucher played one season at New Mexico Junior College, averaging 11.9 points and 6.7 rebounds per game. Then, he went to Northwest College in Powell, Wyoming, where he was named NJCAA Player of the Year after leading the team to a 31–5 record. That season, he shot 62.7% from inside the arc and 44.4% from three-point range, averaging 22.5 points, 11.8 rebounds, and 4.7 blocks per game. His 11.8 rebounds per game were fifth-best in junior college that season, while his 4.7 blocks per game were good for third-best. Following a campus visit, Boucher transferred to Oregon, which he chose over TCU, Minnesota and Texas Tech.

At the beginning of his first year at the University of Oregon, he worried Ducks coach Dana Altman due to his thin physique but made up for it with his energy. In his second game in a Ducks uniform on November 16, 2015, Boucher was competing against Baylor's Rico Gathers, and Boucher scored 15 points and gathered eight rebounds. He set a single-season blocks record for Oregon with 110. Boucher recorded 14 points, 10 rebounds and two steals in the Ducks' 80–68 loss to Oklahoma in the Elite Eight of the NCAA tournament. Following the 2015–16 season he was granted a hardship waiver to play an extra season and complete his sociology degree. He averaged 12.0 points and 6.8 rebounds in his two-year career for the Ducks. As a senior, he was named to the Pac-12 Defensive Team after leading the conference in blocks with 2.6 per game. Boucher scored 23 points and a career-high 19 rebounds against Montana in December 2016. In the Pac-12 tournament semifinals against California on March 10, 2017, an opposing player fell on Boucher's leg awkwardly, but he continued to play and finished the game with 10 points and four rebounds. The following day, an MRI scan revealed a torn ACL and he was ruled out for the remainder of the season.

== Professional career ==
=== Golden State Warriors (2017–2018) ===
Prior to the 2017 NBA draft, Boucher was unable to work out with teams due to his injury. He ultimately went undrafted, but was signed by the Golden State Warriors to a two-way contract, the same team which purchased a draft pick from the Chicago Bulls to choose his Oregon teammate Jordan Bell. Boucher became one of the first players to sign up on the NBA's newest two-way contract policy, which went into effect that season, although his deal was not official until July 14, 2017. On November 2, 2017, Boucher was called up to the NBA G League by the Santa Cruz Warriors and made his debut versus the Reno Bighorns. On March 14, 2018, Boucher made his NBA debut, being called up by the Golden State Warriors to fill in for the injury-riddled lineup. In his first and only minute of action with Golden State, he recorded 1 rebound and 1 three-point attempt in a 117-106 victory over the Los Angeles Lakers. Although he was unavailable to play in the playoffs due to his two-way contract, Boucher was a part of the Warriors championship team after they swept the Cleveland Cavaliers in four games in the 2018 NBA Finals. On June 22, 2018, the Golden State Warriors waived Boucher.

=== Toronto Raptors (2018–2025) ===
On July 20, 2018, Boucher signed with the Toronto Raptors as a free agent for two years worth just over $2 million. On October 26, the Raptors converted Boucher's contract to an NBA two-way contract. Boucher played 28 games with the Raptors' NBA G League affiliate, the Raptors 905 where he averaged 27.2 points, 11.4 rebounds and 4.1 blocks, while also shooting 51.0% from the field. Boucher was named the G League 2018–19 Most Valuable Player and the league's Defensive Player of the Year, becoming the first player to win both awards concurrently, and the first international player to win the league MVP award. Additionally, Boucher was also named to the All-NBA G League First Team. On February 10, 2019, the Raptors signed Boucher to a standard NBA contract. The Raptors made it to the 2019 NBA Finals where they defeated Boucher's former team, the Golden State Warriors. In doing so, Boucher became the first (and so far only) Canadian player to win an NBA title with the NBA's lone Canadian-based franchise.

On November 10, 2019, Boucher tied his career high in points by scoring 15 points in a Raptors win over LeBron James and the Lakers. On December 22, 2019, Boucher scored 21 points, and set a new career high in the Raptors 110–107 win over the Dallas Mavericks. Three days later, on December 25, 2019, Boucher set a new career high again with 24 points in a 118–102 loss to the Boston Celtics. On March 3, 2020, he set a career high in rebounds with 15 in a win against the Phoenix Suns. On August 10, 2020 in the Orlando Bubble, Boucher scored a career-high 25 points against the Milwaukee Bucks.

On November 25, 2020, Boucher re-signed with the Raptors for two years worth $13.5 million. On December 26, Boucher had 22 points, 10 rebounds and a career-high seven blocks against the San Antonio Spurs. On January 14, 2021, Boucher tied a career-high 25 points against the Charlotte Hornets. On February 6, 2021, Boucher hit another scoring high with 29 points, 10 rebounds and 2 blocks in a loss to the Atlanta Hawks. On March 4, 2021, Boucher had a then-season-high 30 points and five rebounds in a 132–125 loss to the Boston Celtics. Then, on April 8, 2021, he hit another scoring high with 38 points, a career-high 19 rebounds and one assist in a 122–113 loss against the Bulls. On April 18, 2021, Boucher scored 31 points with 12 rebounds, two assists, one steal and one block and hit a career-high six threes in a 112–106 win against the Oklahoma City Thunder.

On June 30, 2022, Boucher re-signed with the Raptors on a three-year, $35.25 million contract. He made 76 appearances for the team during the 2022–23 NBA season, averaging 9.4 points, 5.5 rebounds, and 0.4 assists.

With the trade of Pascal Siakam on January 17, 2024, Boucher became the final remaining player from the 2019 championship team on the Raptors roster. In the 2023–24 season, he appeared in 50 games for Toronto, recording averages of 6.4 points, 4.5 rebounds, and 0.7 assists. Boucher made another 50 appearances for the Raptors in the 2024–25 season, averaging 10.0 points, 4.5 rebounds, and 0.7 assists.

=== Boston Celtics (2025–2026) ===
On August 10, 2025, Boucher signed a one-year, $3.3 million contract with the Boston Celtics. He made nine appearances for Boston, posting averages of 2.3 points, 2.0 rebounds, and 0.3 assists.

On February 5, 2026, Boucher was traded to the Utah Jazz in exchange for John Tonje, but was waived by the team.

== Career statistics ==
Legend
GP	Games played	GS	Games started	MPG	Minutes per game
FG%	Field goal percentage	3P%	3-point field goal percentage	FT%	Free throw percentage
RPG	Rebounds per game	APG	Assists per game	SPG	Steals per game
BPG	Blocks per game	PPG	Points per game	**Bold**	Career high
†	Won an NBA championship

=== NBA ===
==== Regular season ====
Year	Team	GP	GS	MPG	FG%	3P%	FT%	RPG	APG	SPG	BPG	PPG
2017–18†	Golden State	1	0	1.3	.000	.000	—	1.0	.0	.0	.0	.0
2018–19†	Toronto	28	0	5.8	.447	.324	**.867**	2.0	.1	.2	.9	3.3
2019–20	Toronto	62	0	13.2	.472	.322	.784	4.5	.4	.4	1.0	6.6
2020–21	Toronto	60	**14**	**24.2**	**.514**	**.383**	.788	**6.7**	**1.1**	**.6**	**1.9**	**13.6**
2021–22	Toronto	**80**	9	21.1	.464	.297	.777	6.2	.3	**.6**	.9	9.4
2022–23	Toronto	76	0	20.0	.493	.328	.762	5.5	.4	**.6**	.8	9.4
2023–24	Toronto	50	0	14.1	.507	.330	.772	4.1	.5	.3	.5	6.4
2024–25	Toronto	50	0	17.2	.492	.363	.782	4.5	.7	.5	.5	10.0
2025–26	Boston	9	0	10.4	.320	.133	.750	2.0	.3	.6	.8	2.3
Career		416	23	17.6	.487	.336	.779	5.1	.5	.5	.9	8.7

==== Playoffs ====
Year	Team	GP	GS	MPG	FG%	3P%	FT%	RPG	APG	SPG	BPG	PPG
2019†	Toronto	2	0	2.0	.400	.333	.000	.5	.0	.0	.5	2.5
2020	Toronto	**7**	0	6.1	.273	**.400**	.000	1.7	.1	.0	.3	1.1
2022	Toronto	6	0	**21.7**	**.619**	**.400**	**.900**	**5.8**	**.2**	**.2**	**1.2**	**11.2**
Career		15	0	11.8	.534	.391	.750	3.2	.1	.1	.7	5.3

=== College ===
Year	Team	GP	GS	MPG	FG%	3P%	FT%	RPG	APG	SPG	BPG	PPG
2015–16	Oregon	**38**	**35**	**25.8**	**.539**	.339	**.685**	**7.4**	**.4**	**.8**	**2.9**	**12.1**
2016–17	Oregon	31	12	23.6	.524	**.350**	.565	6.1	**.4**	.4	2.5	11.8
Career		69	47	24.8	.532	.344	.641	6.8	.4	.6	2.7	12.0

College statistics only available for final two years at Oregon.
