= Central School (Pontiac, Michigan) =

- U.S. National Register of Historic Places
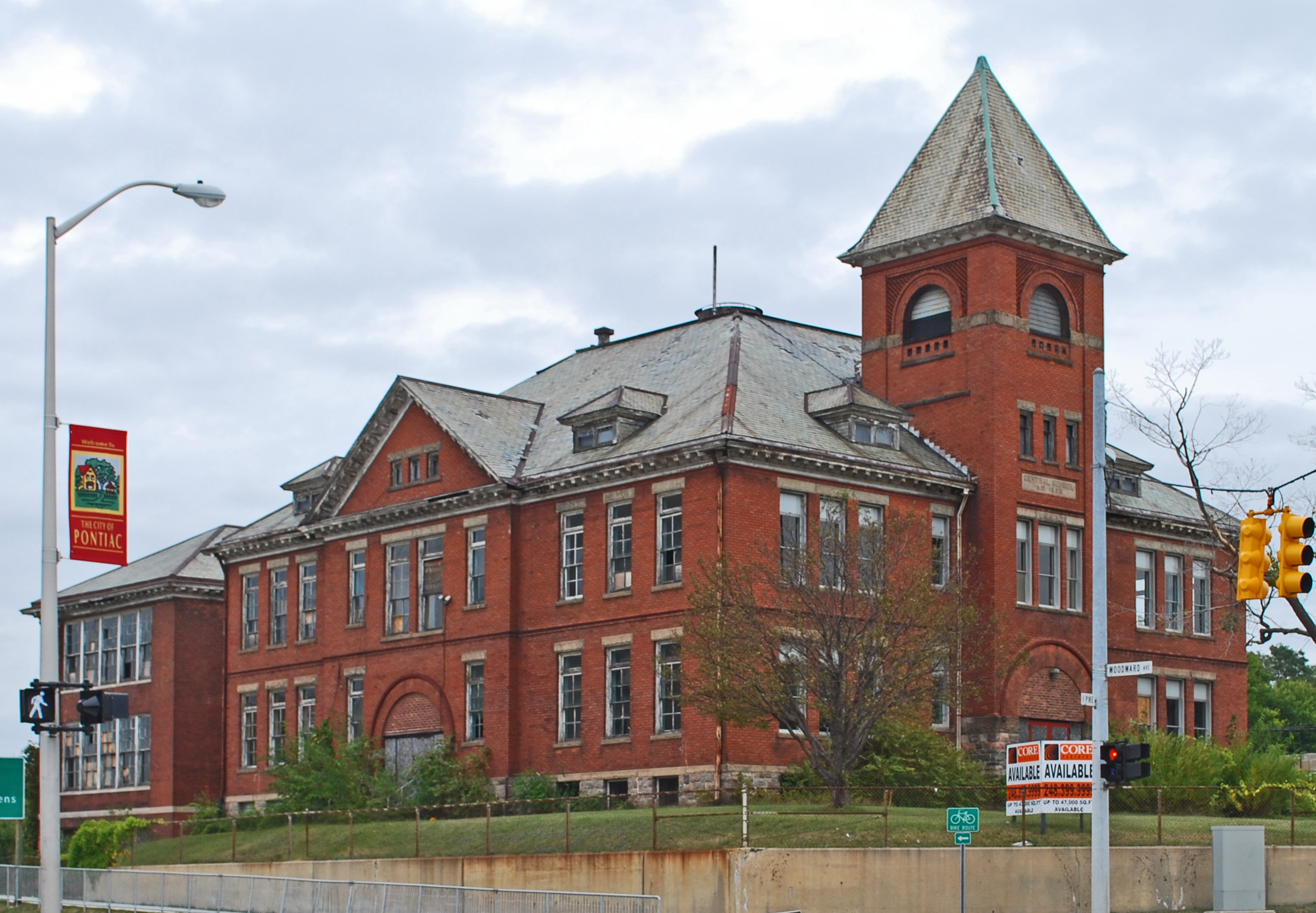
- Interactive map
- Location: 101 E. Pike St., Pontiac, Michigan
- Coordinates: 42°38′16″N 83°17′18″W
- Area: 1.7 acres (0.69 ha)
- Built: 1893
- Built by: H. Heitsch
- Architectural style: Richardsonian Romanesque
- NRHP reference No.: 84001809
- Added to NRHP: February 16, 1984

Central School is a former school building located at 101 East Pike Street in Pontiac, Michigan. It is the oldest remaining school building in Pontiac. The building was listed on the National Register of Historic Places in 1984.

== History ==
Pontiac's Union School was built on this site in 1853. The Union School was demolished in 1893, and this building was constructed in its place. The building was constructed for $12,000 by H. Heitsch, a local builder/contractor. It was designed to accommodate 320 students in eight classrooms, four per floor, for students in grades 1–8. An addition was constructed in 1917, designed to be compatible with the original building. A second, more contemporary addition was constructed in 1957.

By the 1980s, the school housed the adult education and job placement program of the Pontiac School District. By the 2000s it was vacant.

== Description ==
Central School is a two-and-one-half story Richardsonian Romanesque brick structure situated on a small hill near Pontiac's central business district. The building is topped with a steeply pitched hip roof with projecting side gables and hipped dormers. The main facade is dominated by a four-story, pyramid-roofed central projecting tower. The main entrance is located in the base of the tower. Secondary entrances are at the sides underneath the dormers. The 1917 addition continues the materials, scale and detailing of the original structure.

== See also ==
- National Register of Historic Places listings in Oakland County, Michigan
