= Quebec Pioneers =

Canadian professional basketball team

- League: BSL
- Founded: 2023
- Folded: 2023
- History: Quebec Pioneers; 2023–present
- Location: Quebec City, Canada
- Team colours
- CEO: Cyrille Poitevineau-Millin
- General manager: David Petroziello
- Head coach: David Petroziello
- Website: Office site

The Quebec Pioneers were a Canadian professional basketball team based in Quebec City, Quebec.

Founded in 2023, the team was scheduled to compete in the Basketball Super League (BSL), but never played a game.

== Background ==
Prior to 2023, the most recent professional basketball team in Quebec City was in 2011 when the National Basketball League of Canada (NBLC) added the Quebec Kebs. The team did not play in the 2012–13 NBL Canada season after failing to secure a new ownership group. Quebec was without a professional basketball team for 10 years.

On June 6, 2023, it was announced that a new professional basketball league team, the Quebec Pioneers led by CEO Cyrille Poitevineau-Millin, would join the Basketball Super League for the upcoming 2023 season.
