= Pontiac Northern High School =

Former public high school in Pontiac, Michigan, U.S. (1958–2009)

Location
- 1051 Arlene Ave. Pontiac, Michigan; United States
- Coordinates: 42°40′03″N 83°16′10″W

Information
- Type: Public high school
- Established: 1958
- Closed: June 12, 2009 (Consolidated with Pontiac Central High School to form Pontiac High School)
- School district: School District of the City of Pontiac
- Grades: 9–12
- Gender: Co-educational
- Colors: Red and White
- Nickname: Huskies
- Rivals: Pontiac Central High School

Pontiac Northern High School was a public high school in Pontiac, Michigan. It was established on September 2, 1958, and was consolidated with Pontiac Central High School on June 12, 2009, to form Pontiac High School. Pontiac High School had occupied the former Pontiac Northern High School building, which was built in 1958, the year Pontiac Northern was established.

== Athletics ==
Pontiac Northern won state championships in boys' track & field in 1990 and 1997 and in boys' basketball in 2001 and 2002.

Pontiac Northern also won the World Championship in robotics in 2003.

== Notable alumni ==
- Paul Haynes (class of 2000) – basketball player who was the SWAC Player of the Year in 2002
