= Montreal Sasquatch =

- League: Premier Basketball League
- Founded: 2008
- History: Montreal Sasquatch; 2008–2009
- Arena: Centre Pierre Charbonneau
- Location: Montreal, Quebec
- Team colours: red, blue
- General manager: TBD
- Head coach: Tito Destin
- Ownership: Soar Enterprises
- Championships: 0

The Montreal Sasquatch were a team of the Premier Basketball League (PBL) that played in the 2008–09 season under two different ownership groups.

== History ==
Réal Bourassa was granted an expansion franchise in the PBL for the 2009 season. However, on February 5, 2009, the PBL canceled the franchise after it emerged that players weren't being paid. A dispersal draft of Sasquatch players was then conducted.

On February 11, the PBL announced that Soar Enterprises, another ownership group, would take over the franchise and play the remainder of the season. The squad was to be known as Team Montreal as Bourassa retained the rights to the name Sasquatch.

The Sasquatch were one of four teams in the PBL Atlantic Division that enhanced their 20-game PBL schedule with 6 exhibitions to compete for the "Champlain Cup." When the Sasquatch were removed from the league, the other teams decided that the remaining, unplayed exhibitions involving the Sasquatch would be treated as forfeits.

The PBL, which arranged all league travel, intervened heavily to ensure that the next three road games took place. However, the venue arranged for the reconstituted team's first home game, on February 27, fell through; the visiting Halifax Rainmen objected to an alternate gym and the PBL ruled that it did not meet league standards. A home game against Wilmington the next day was likewise cancelled, and the remaining home games were played at the opponent's venue.

== 2009 roster ==
=== First half ===
This is the Sasquatch roster before the PBL removed the Sasquatch from the league.

Head Coach: Alejandro Hasbani

#		Pos.	Ht.	Player	Acquired	College
3	(United States)	SG	6'2	Randy Gill	2008	Bowie State
4	(Canada)	PG	6'2	Manix Auriantal	2008	New York
6	(Canada)	PG	5'10	Bobby Miller	2008	Southern New Hampshire
11	(Canada)	SF	6'8	Louis-Patrick Levros	2008	Rhode Island CC
13	(Canada)	PG	6'4	Kevin Dulude	2008	Royal Military College
15	(United States)	PG	6'0	Lantrice Green	2008	Virginia Union
21	(Canada)	PG	5'7	Denburk Reid	2008	McGill
21	(United States)	SG	6'5	Buster Perkins	2008	Virginia Union
23	(France)	SG	6'6	Steve Pellan	2008	Mobile
24	(United States)	SG	6'6	Quilninious Randall	2008	Northeastern
32	(United States)	PF	6'6	Jamaal Wise	2008	Rhode Island
34	(United States)	C	6'8	John Daryl Ruffus	2008	Fayetteville State

In the PBL dispersal draft four players were selected:

- Randy Gill by the Detroit Panthers
- John Ruffus by the Quebec Kebs (traded to Manchester on March 9)
- Xavier Morton by the Rochester RazorSharks
- Jamaal Wise by the Manchester Millrats (traded to Quebec on March 9)

All other Sasquatch players were given their unconditional release and became free agents.

=== Second half ===
Head Coach: Tito Destin

#		Pos.	Ht.	Player	Acquired	College
2		SG	5'11	Todd 'Tinkle' Tinkhalm	2009
5		SG	6'2	Kevin John	2009
12	(Canada)	PG	6'2	Shawn Corbin	2009	Brandon University
14		PG	6'0	John Bethia	2009
22	(Canada)	PG	5'6	Denburk 'Berky' Reid	2008	McGill
25	(Canada)	SF	6'8	Louis-Patrick 'LP' Levros	2008	Rhode Island
31		SF	6'4	Frank Filoa	2009
35		SF	6'6	Kevin Benjamin	2009
41	(Canada)	PG	5'10	Bobby Miller	2008	Southern New Hampshire
42	(United States)	SG	6'5	Buster Perkins	2008	Virginia Union
43	(United States)	PG	6'2	Mario Kinsey	2009	Texas College
44		C	6'10	David Dubois	2009	Idaho

== 2009 season schedule ==
Date	Opponent	Home/Away	Score	High points	High rebounds	High assists	Location/Attendance	Record
January 2	Manchester Millrats	Home	97-100	John Ruffus (24)	Jamaal Wise (8)	Randy Gill (4)	Centre Pierre Charbonneau	1-0
January 3	Halifax Rainmen	Home	127-125 (OT)	Randy Gill (38)	Jamaal Wise (13)	Jamaal Wise (3)	Centre Pierre Charbonneau	1-1
January 9	Vermont Frost Heaves	Away	111-133	Randy Gill (28)	Jamaal Wise (9)	Randy Gill (6)	Barre Auditorium	1-2
January 11	Halifax Rainmen	Away	105-103	John Ruffus (31)	John Ruffus (10)	Randy Gill (8)	Halifax Metro Centre	2-2
January 23	Manchester Millrats	Home	131-113	Randy Gill (19)	Xavier Morton & Kevin Dellude (6)	Louis-Patrick Levros (3)	Centre Pierre Charbonneau	2-3
January 24	Vermont Frost Heaves	Away	107-86	Randy Gill (24)	Xavier Morton (9)	Randy Gill (7)	Centre Pierre Charbonneau	2-4
January 31	Quebec Kebs	Away	98-73	Jamaal Wise (35)	Jamaal Wise & Kevin Dellude (9)	Randy Gill (9)	Pavillon de la Jeunesse	3-4
February 1	Vermont Frost Heaves	Away	78-103	Louis-Patrick Levros (19)	Xavier Morton (10)	Randy Gill, Jamaal Wise, Kevin Dellude, & Lantrice Green (1)	Barre Auditorium	3-5
February 5–11	Franchise transferred and roster reconstituted; see text							
February 13	Manchester Millrats	Away	85-137	David Dubois (26)	David Dubois (19)	Kevin John (7)	Southern New Hampshire Fieldhouse	3-6
February 20	Manchester Millrats	Away	82-121	Freddie Petkus & Mark Flavin (14)	David Dubois (12)	Buster Perkins (4)	Southern New Hampshire Fieldhouse	3-7
February 21	Wilmington Sea Dawgs	Away	92-111	Ratana Sak (31)	David Dubois (11)	Lennox Malcolm (4)	Schwartz Center	3-8
February 27	Halifax Rainmen	Home	Game cancelled: Unavailability of suitable venue Game moved to Halifax on March 29					
February 28	Wilmington Sea Dawgs	Home	Game cancelled: Unavailability of suitable venue					
March 8	Detroit Panthers	Away	115-119	Ratana Sak (28)	David Dubois (15)	Buster Perkins (15)	Groves High School	3-9
March 14	Vermont Frost Heaves	Away*	91-116	Tristan Martin (25)	David Dubois (11)	Tristan Martin (4)	Barre Auditorium	3-10
March 22	Quebec Kebs	Away	89-130	Tristan Martin (37)	Tristan Martin (11)	Buster Perkins (7)	Pavillon de la Jeunesse	3-11
March 28	Halifax Rainmen	Away	89-130	Andrew Richards (23)	Jasen Hunt (13)	Tristan Martin (5)	Halifax Metro Centre	3-12
March 29	Halifax Rainmen	Away*	109-147	Tristan Martin (34)	Andrew Richards (14)	Tristan Martin (4)	Halifax Metro Centre	3-13
March 31	Rochester Razorsharks	Home					Attack Athletics	

* Originally a home game for Montreal

== See also ==
- Premier Basketball League
- Canada Basketball
- Canadian Interuniversity Sport
- Canadian Colleges Athletic Association
- Montreal
