= Centre Pierre Charbonneau =

Sports arena located at Olympic Park in Montreal, Quebec, Canada

Coordinates: 45°33′42″N 73°33′0″W

Centre Pierre-Charbonneau
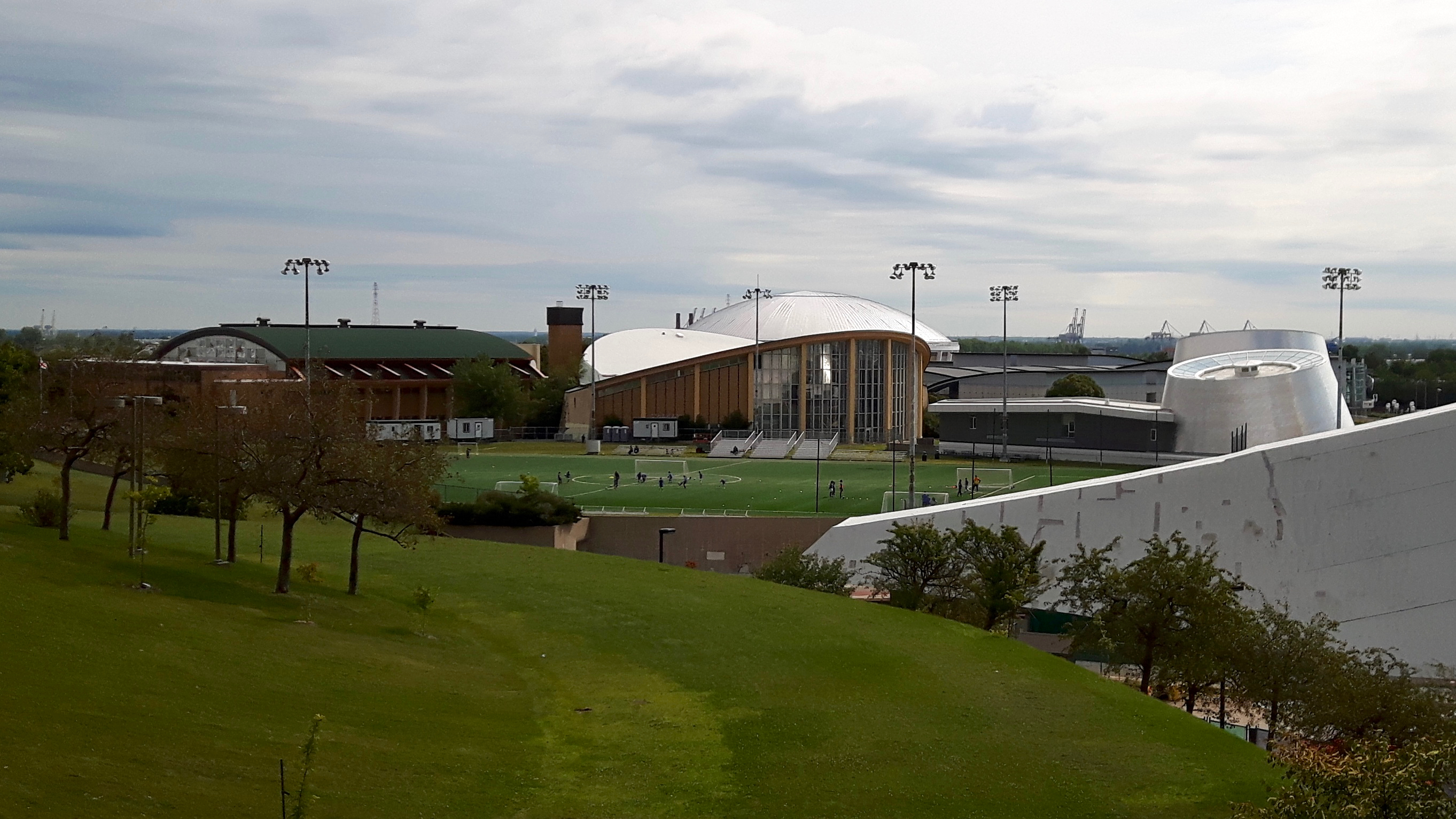
- Interactive map of Centre Pierre-Charbonneau
- Location: 3000, rue Viau; Montreal, Quebec; H1V 3J3
- Owner: City of Montreal
- Capacity: Basketball: 2,700

Construction
- Opened: 1960
- Architect: Paul Lambert

Tenants
- Montreal Matrix (ABA) (2005–2008); Montreal Sasquatch (PBL) (2009); Montreal Jazz (NBL Canada) (2012–2013); Montreal Tundra (BSL) (2023–present)

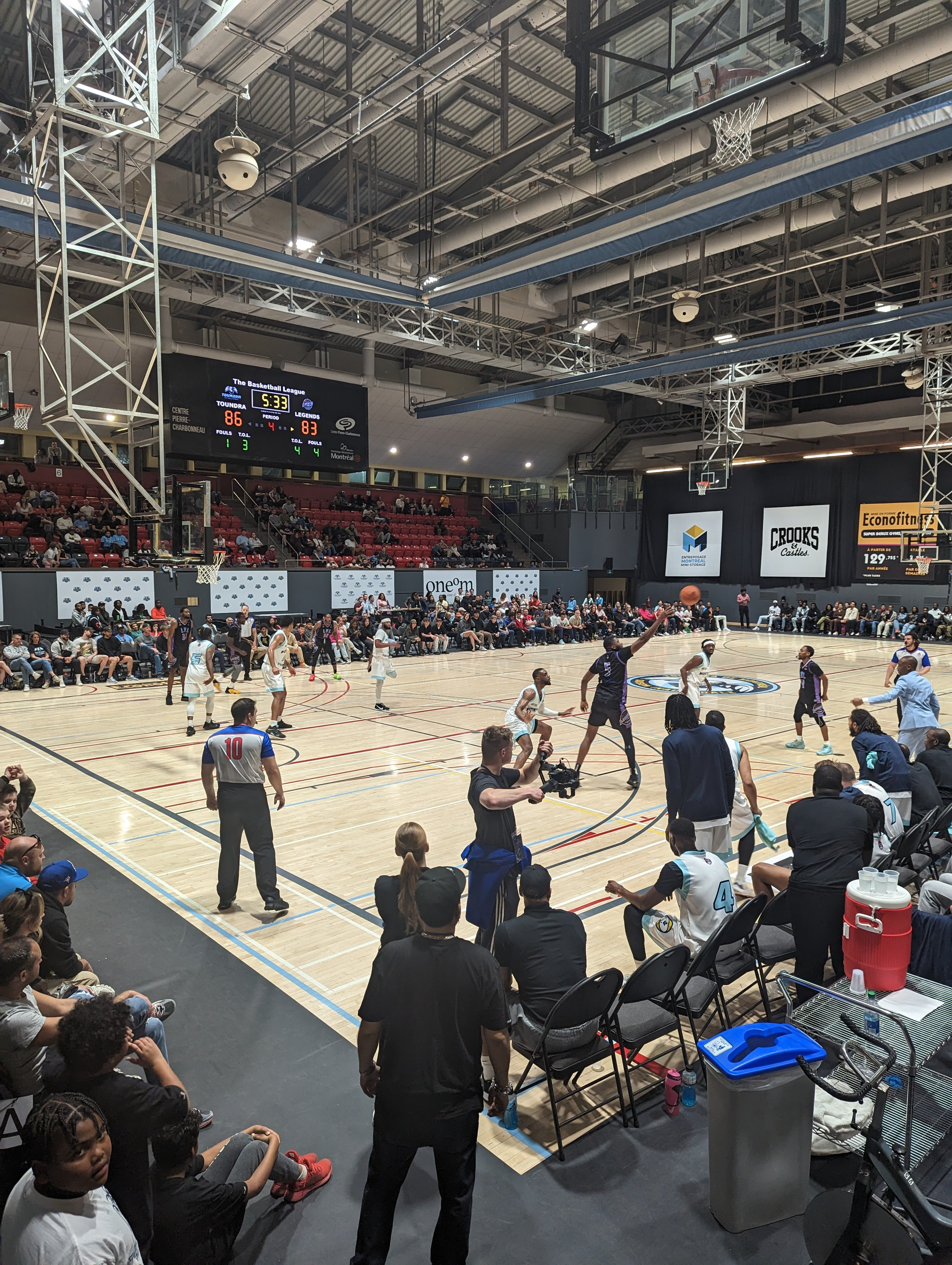
The Basketball League game between the Montreal Tundra and the Lehigh Valley Vipers, April 2023

Centre Pierre Charbonneau is a community centre located in the Olympic Park in Montreal, Quebec, Canada. It was built in 1957–1959 and opened to the public in 1960. Its gymnasium holds 2,700 people. The arena has hosted a variety of events, including the wrestling events at the 1976 Summer Olympics.

== Events ==
In September 2016, Montreal Roller Derby hosted a 2016 International Women's Flat Track Derby Association Division 1 roller derby playoff tournament at the venue.

=== Basketball ===
It has been the home arena for a variety of short-lived minor league basketball teams:

- Montreal Jazz of the National Basketball League of Canada.
- Montreal Matrix of the American Basketball Association
- Montreal Sasquatch of the Premier Basketball League
- Montreal Tundra of the Basketball Super League (2023-present)

== See also ==
- Thin-shell structure
- List of thin shell structures
