= Elmer R. Webster School =

- U.S. National Register of Historic Places
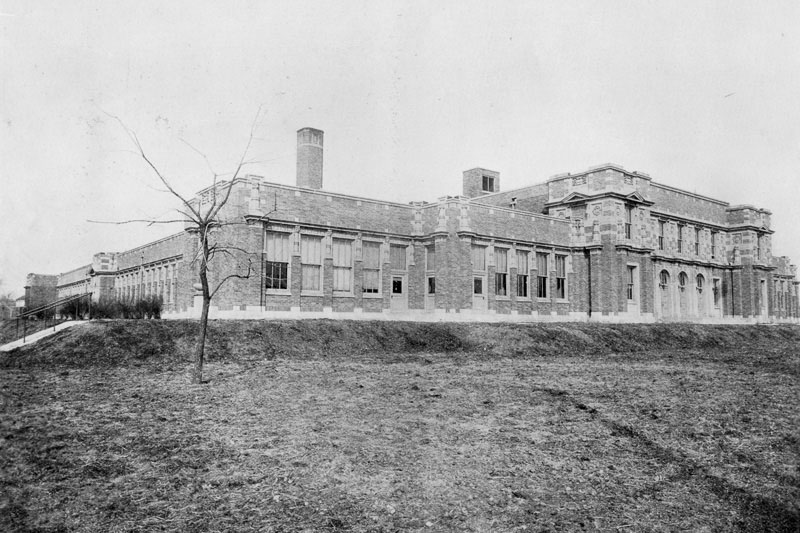
- Interactive map
- Location: 640 West Huron St. Pontiac, Michigan
- Coordinates: 42°38′10″N 83°18′58″W
- Built: 1920
- Built by: Isaac J. Isgrigg, Charles F. Erb
- Architect: Perkins, Fellows and Hamilton
- Architectural style: Classical Revival, Prairie School
- NRHP reference No.: 100007710
- Added to NRHP: May 9, 2022

The Elmer R. Webster School is a former school building located at 640 West Huron Street in Pontiac, Michigan. The school building is being redeveloped into the Webster Community Center. It was listed on the National Register of Historic Places in 2022.

== History ==
In the 1910s, the population of Pontiac expanded from the core of the city outward, requiring the construction of neighborhood elementary schools to service the influx of population. Seminole Hills, on the west side of the city, was developed in 1916, and the school district acquired land in the area to construct this school. The Pontiac school district hired the Chicago architectural firm of Perkins, Fellows and Hamilton, who had designed two previous schools in Pontiac, to design the new school. Work began in 1920, and the school was opened in 1921. An addition, also designed by Perkins, Fellows and Hamilton, was constructed the next year.

Originally, an all-white school, Webster was integrated in the early 1970s. However, as Pontiac's population decreased, schools began closing, and Webster was shuttered in 2007. Micah 6 Community, a local non-profit, purchased the school in 2016, with plans to rehabilitate it into a community center. It originally was planned to be opened Spring 2023, but the COVID-19 pandemic caused delays.

== Description ==
The Elmer R. Webster School is a symmetrical U-shaped building with the main building located in the front, and two wings surrounding an exterior courtyard extending to the rear. The building is constructed of tan-orange brick, and is primarily a single story, save for a small second floor area at the front of the building. The exterior is low and horizontal, expressing a Prairie School architecture. The exterior contains cast stone ornamentation, representative of a Classical Revival style.

== See also ==
- National Register of Historic Places listings in Oakland County, Michigan
