= Newfoundland Rogues =

Professional basketball team

- League: The Basketball League 2023, 2026 present BSL: 2024-2025; ABA 2021–2022
- Founded: 2021
- Arena: Mary Brown's Centre
- Location: St. John's, Newfoundland and Labrador, Canada
- Team colours
- Ownership: Tony Kenny
- Website: nfldrogues.ca

The Newfoundland Rogues are a Canadian professional minor league basketball team based in St. John's, Newfoundland and Labrador. The team competes in the Atlantic division of The Basketball League.

== Franchise history ==
=== Creation and inaugural season ===
The franchise was established in 2021 as an ABA expansion team, headed by Tony Kenny, President of 2001 Investments Limited; and coached by Jerry Williams. The team competes in the Basketball League (TBL).

The team signed a five-year lease to play their homes games at the Mary Brown's Centre in downtown St. John's. Their first game, as part of the ABA's 2021–22 season, took place on November 27 against the New York State's Elmira Eagles, a fellow member of the league's Northeast Division. The Rogues started the season on an unbeaten streak of six matches. On January 7, 2022 Tony Kenny announced that the next three series were postponed due to enhanced COVID-19 travel restrictions related to the emergence of the Omicron variant.

On September 15, 2022, Tony Kenny announced that the team would leave the ABA and join The Basketball League for the 2023 season.

In April 2023, the team announced it would be joining the BSL for the 2024 season. In 2025 it was announced the team would rejoin The Basketball League for the 2026 season.

== Personnel ==
=== Current roster ===
Newfoundland Rogues roster
Players
Coaches

Pos.	No.	Nat.	Name	Ht.	Wt.	Age
PG	1	(Canada)	Barrett, Shakwon	6 ft 4 in (1.93 m)			Tulane
G	4	(United Kingdom) (Scotland)	Lynch, Kieran	6 ft 0 in (1.83 m)
F	6	(United States)	Smith, Jakorie	6 ft 7 in (2.01 m)			Tarleton State
SF	7	(Canada)	Moffatt, Noel	6 ft 5 in (1.96 m)			Memorial
G	8	(Canada)	Harnett, Ryan	6 ft 1 in (1.85 m)			Dalhousie
F	9	(Canada)	Earles, Steven	6 ft 7 in (2.01 m)			Memorial
G	10	(United States)	Boyd, Dedric	6 ft 4 in (1.93 m)			Tennessee State
PG	11	(United States)	Bridgewaters, Kevin	5 ft 8 in (1.73 m)			Chattanooga
SF	12	(United States)	Turner, Leonard	6 ft 5 in (1.96 m)			Vanguard
F	13	(United States)	Lefeau, Anthony	6 ft 7 in (2.01 m)
C	14	(United States)	Stroemple Jr., Kevin	6 ft 10 in (2.08 m)			UW–Stout
F	15	(Canada)	D'Silva, Kingslee	6 ft 5 in (1.96 m)			Guelph

Head coach
- Doug Partridge
Assistant(s)
- Tim O'Connor
- Glen Sooley

Legend
- (DP) Unsigned draft pick
- (FA) Free agent
- (S) Suspended
- Injured

Roster
Updated: February 18, 2026
