= Saginaw Soul =

- League: Basketball Super League
- Founded: 2025
- History: Saginaw Soul
- Arena: Buena Vista High School
- Location: Saginaw, Michigan
- Team colors: Sky blue, black, yellow, white
- President: Joseph Garety
- Head coach: Isiah Thomas
- Ownership: Kelly Garety
- Website: saginawsoul.com

The Saginaw Soul is a professional basketball team based in Saginaw, Michigan. Established in 2025, the team is a member of Basketball Super League (BSL), an emerging North American professional basketball league. The Soul are set to begin their inaugural season in the 2026–27 BSL campaign.

== History ==
It was announced that Saginaw, Michigan, would be awarded a franchise for the upcoming 2025 BSL season. Two-time NBA champion Isiah Thomas will be the head coach.
