= Pontiac Central High School =

Coordinates: 42°38′16.9″N 83°18′11.0″W

- 300 West Huron Street Pontiac, Michigan

Information
- Type: Public high school, Co-educational
- Established: September 4, 1849 (named Pontiac Central on September 2, 1958)
- Closed: June 12, 2009 (consolidated with Pontiac Northern High School to form Pontiac High School)
- School district: School District of the City of Pontiac
- Grades: 9–12
- Campus size: 11 acres (4.6 ha)
- Colors: Orange and black
- Nickname: Chiefs
- Rivals: Pontiac Northern High School

Pontiac Central High School was one of two public high schools in Pontiac, Michigan, United States. It had been an accredited high school from September 4, 1849, until its closing on June 12, 2009. By December 2008 administrators had plans to consolidate it with Pontiac Northern High School to form Pontiac High School.

Until 1958, the school was known as Pontiac High School; it took on its final name upon the opening of Pontiac Northern High School, where the current Pontiac High School stands. The final incarnation of Pontiac Central, a precast concrete building, was built in 1972, replacing a brick building built in 1913.

== Notable alumni ==
- C. Donald Davidson - visionary and designer of the 1960s Pontiac Urban Renewal Plan (Phoenix Center) and the former Pontiac Silverdome stadium. Owner and Publisher of the former Pontiac Times Newspaper.
- Bill Glover - played basketball for Michigan State University, previous director of athletics at Pontiac Central High School.
- Hayes Jones - gold medalist in 110 meter hurdles track and field at the 1964 Summer Olympics, Tokyo.
- Jack Kevorkian - assisted Suicide Doctor
- Micki King - gold medalist in springboard diving at the 1972 Summer Olympics, Munich, Germany.
- Michael Mallory - writer
- Willo Davis Roberts - writer
- Campy Russell - NBA player, brother of Frank and Walker, played 11 years for the Cleveland Cavaliers; 1 for the New York Knicks.
- Frank Russell - NBA player, brother of Campy and Walker, played for the Chicago Bulls.
- Walker D. Russell - NBA player, brother of Campy and Frank, played for the Detroit Pistons; Indiana Pacers; and the Atlanta Hawks.
- Al Taubman - developer of suburban retail establishments. His company, Taubman Centers brought to fruition many of the largest shopping malls in the United States
- Joe Urla - actor known for playing the recurring role of Elaine Benes's co-worker Dugan in the NBC sitcom television series Seinfeld
