= Pontiac High School (Michigan) =

Public high school in Pontiac, Michigan, United States

Location
- 1051 Arlene Avenue; Pontiac, Michigan 48340; United States; 42°40′2″N 83°16′8″W

Information
- Type: Public High school
- Established: Originally established in 1849; 177 years ago. Reestablished in 2009; 17 years ago.
- School district: School District of the City of Pontiac
- Teaching staff: 52.57 (FTE)
- Grades: 9–12
- Gender: Co-ed
- Enrollment: 942 (2023–2024)
- Student to teacher ratio: 17.92
- Colors: Purple; Silver; Black
- Athletics conference: Oakland Activities Association
- Nickname: Phoenix
- Website: pontiachigh.pontiacschools.org

Student assessments
- 2021–22 school year Change vs. prior year

M-STEP 11th grade proficiency rates (Science / Social Studies)
- Advanced %: ≤5 / ≤5
- Proficient %: – / –
- PR. Proficient %: 14.4 / 60.7
- Not Proficient %: 67.8 / 29.8

Average test scores
- SAT Total: 801.0 (▼ −44.9)

Pontiac High School (PHS) is a public high school in Pontiac, Michigan, United States. It was formed and reestablished in 2009 from the consolidation of Pontiac Central High School and Pontiac Northern High School. The school occupies the former Pontiac Northern building.

== History ==
Pontiac High School was established in 1849. When Pontiac Northern High School was established in 1958, Pontiac High School was renamed Pontiac Central High School.

In 2009, Pontiac Central High School and Pontiac Northern High School consolidated and Pontiac High School was reestablished. Pontiac High School occupies the former Pontiac Northern High School building.

The name of Pontiac High School's athletic teams is the Phoenix to signify Pontiac High as a new school, risen from the ashes, as in the legend of the Phoenix.

The nonprofit organization Great Lakes Education Project suggested in 2013 that Pontiac High be closed. By 2017 the Michigan State School Reform Office considered closing the school; in response parents, school district employees, and others in the area attended a rally protesting against the movement to close the school.
