= Modie Cox =

American former basketball player (born 1972)

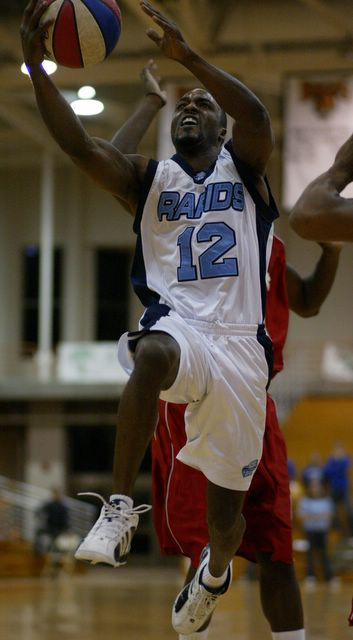
- Cox with the Buffalo Rapids, 2006

Personal information
- Born: December 29, 1972 (age 53) Niagara Falls, New York, U.S.
- Listed height: 5 ft 11 in (1.80 m)

Career information
- High school: La Salle
- College: Buffalo (1992–1995)
- Playing career: 1996–2007
- Position: Point guard
- Number: 12
- Coaching career: 1997–present

Career history

Playing
- 1996–1998: Connecticut Pride
- 1998–1999: Pietermaritzburg Tuskers (PBL)
- 1999–2000: Milton Keynes Lions
- 2005–2006: Buffalo Rapids
- 2006–2007: Buffalo Silverbacks

Coaching
- 1997–1998: Buffalo (graduate assistant)
- 2000–2002: Niagara Catholic HS (assistant)
- 2005–2006: Buffalo Rapids (assistant)
- 2006–2007: Buffalo Silverbacks (assistant)
- 2021–2022: St. Mary's HS (assistant)
- 2023–present: Niagara Falls HS (assistant)

Career highlights
- As player: ABA Community Service Award (2007); All-MCC Team (1995); WNY Player of the Year (1991); Nike All-American, Honorable Mention (1990); New York State Class B champion (1988); As assistant coach: CHSAA Class B champion (2022)
Medals
Men's basketball
Representing the Western Region
Empire State Games
Gold medal – first place	1991 Albany

Maurice V. "Modie" Cox (born December 29, 1972) is an American former basketball player. He played collegiately for the Buffalo Bulls, and professionally for the Pietermaritzburg Tuskers, Milton Keynes Lions, Buffalo Rapids and Buffalo Silverbacks. As a player, he has been New York State Class B champion, Empire State Games gold medalist, and All-MCC honoree.

Cox is currently assistant coach for the Niagara Falls Wolverines. He previously was assistant coach for the Buffalo Bulls, Niagara Catholic Patriots, Buffalo Rapids, Buffalo Silverbacks and St. Mary's Lancers. As a coach, he has been CHSAA Class B champion.

An acclaimed motivational speaker, Cox has toured his Winning Because I Tried outreach program for youths and vulnerable populations since 2007. He was awarded the inaugural ABA Community Service Award in honor of his work.

== High school career ==
Maurice "Modie" Cox was born in Niagara Falls, New York, and raised by his grandmother until her death. Cox never knew his biological father, and his mother was a drug addict. At the age of 15, he was adopted by the coach of his local Boys Club team.

He took up the position of point guard after idolizing Kenny Anderson and Mark Macon, wearing the jersey number #12 in tribute to both players.

Cox played for the varsity squad of La Salle Senior High School as a freshman, winning the 1988 New York State Class B championship. Following his junior year, he received honorable mention in the running for Nike High School All-American. He was honored as Buffalo News Player of the Year following his senior season, where he averaged 16.7 points per game and set school records for both steals and assists.

He competed for the Western Region Open team in the 1991 Empire State Games, capturing a gold medal.

== College career ==
After being recruited by University at Buffalo as the centerpiece of their new Division I program, Cox was ruled academically ineligible under Proposition 48 and could not play his freshman season for the Buffalo Bulls.

He was named team captain for his junior and senior seasons. Cox led the team in scoring during his junior season, averaging 12.6 points per game. In his senior season, Cox led the Mid-Continent Conference in assists and was named to the All-Conference Team.

Cox attempted to have his fourth year of eligibility restored by the NCAA for the 1995–96 season, but his request was denied. He tried out for the school's football team as a wide receiver in August 1995, but was cut.

He played for the Converse All-Stars in November 1995, an alumni team who defeated the 1995–96 St. Bonaventure Bonnies and 1995–96 Buffalo Bulls squads in exhibition play.

In September 1996, he graduated with a bachelor's degree in sociology.

== Professional career ==
The Connecticut Pride of the Continental Basketball Association signed Cox in 1996, although he never played for the team.

He started his professional career with the Pietermaritzburg Tuskers of the Premier Basketball League, averaging 17.3 points per game during their 1998–99 season.

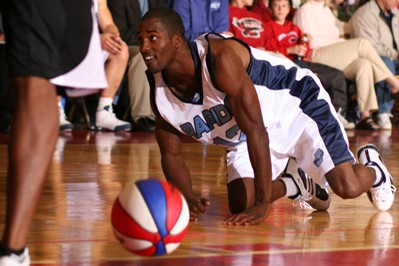
Cox diving for the ball during the inaugural Buffalo Rapids game, 2005

Cox played for the Milton Keynes Lions of the British Basketball League, averaging 3.16 steals per game during their 1999–00 season.

He attended off-season camps with the New York Knicks of the National Basketball Association in 2000 and 2001, but was cut from the roster.

Cox was signed to the Buffalo Rapids of the American Basketball Association in October 2005. He helped the team win its first playoff game in March 2006, contributing 12 assists in their 133–88 victory over the Boston Frenzy. When the franchise was forced to rebrand in May 2006 following an ownership change, Cox came up with the Buffalo Silverbacks moniker that they used going forward.

After Tim Winn left the Buffalo Silverbacks in August 2006, Cox took over running the team's Do Your Best, Never Quit youth clinics. In recognition of his work, Cox was honored with the inaugural American Basketball Association Community Service Award in January 2007.

== Coaching career ==
While pursuing his master's degree in urban planning, Cox served as graduate assistant under Tim Cohane for the 1997–98 Buffalo Bulls season.

Cox served as assistant coach for Niagara Catholic High School from 2000 to 2002 under Pat Monti.

While still active as a player, Cox also served as assistant coach for the Buffalo Rapids under Richard Jacob, and later for the Buffalo Silverbacks under Trevor Ruffin.

In 2008, Cox was hired as personal trainer and mentor for Byron Brown III, the teenage son of Mayor Byron Brown II. Brown III went on to play Division I basketball for Binghamton University.

As assistant coach under Ryan Gallo, Cox helped lead St. Mary's High School to the 2022 CHSAA Class B championship.

He has served as assistant coach for Niagara Falls High School under Carlos Bradberry since 2023.

== Personal life ==
I’ve got something now that I’m as passionate about as basketball. Other than my son, I’ve never had anything like that.

— Modie Cox, on motivational speaking

Cox was arrested in November 1996 for cocaine possession, serving eight months in jail for two misdemeanor charges.

He son Kaleb was born in 2002 and is a graduate of Canisius High School.

After the Buffalo Silverbacks folded in 2007, Cox continued their youth outreach program and rebranded it as Winning Because I Tried. He has given over 350 motivational speeches to children through the program. John Wallace became the program's vice president in 2010, and has joined Cox on select speaking engagements.

From 2013 to 2016, Cox served as executive director of the Buffalo Police Athletic League.

Cox serves on the board of directors for Junior Jerry Jam, a nonprofit organization dedicated to staging live musical performances that benefit charitable causes.
