= 2006 ABA All-Star Game =

Exhibition basketball game

East	West
129	127
- Date: February 11, 2006
- Venue: BankAtlantic Center, Sunrise
- MVP: Armen Gilliam

The 2006 American Basketball Association All-Star Game was held in Sunrise, Florida at the 20,737 seat BankAtlantic Center on February 11, 2006, where East defeated West, 129–127.

Former NBA player Armen Gilliam who came out of retirement in 2005 to play for the Pittsburgh Xplosion, was named the Most Valuable Player, though the main attraction of the All-Star Game was Tim Hardaway who had already participated in 5 NBA All-Star Games in his career.

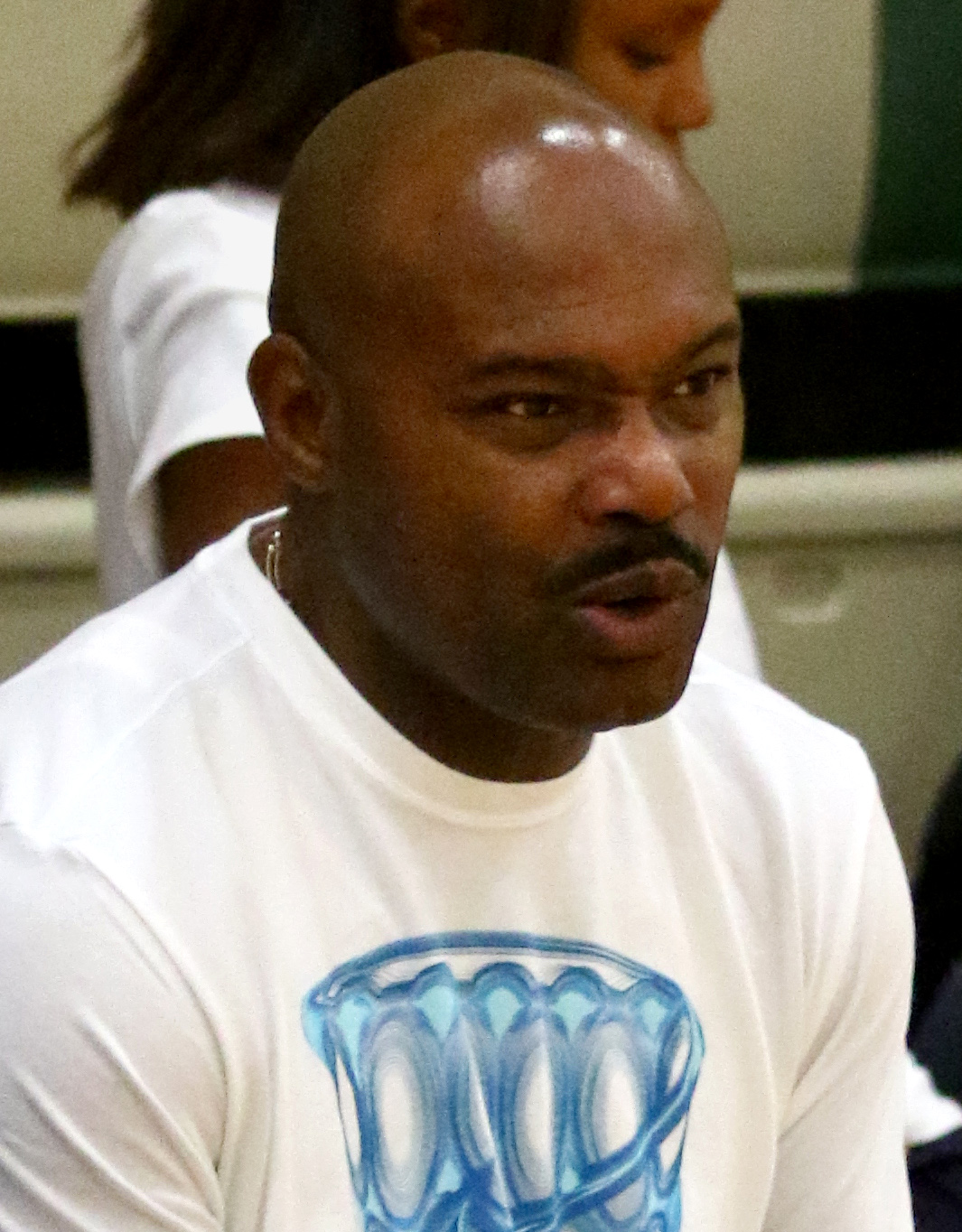
Tim Hardaway was selected for the East All-Stars.

== 2006 ABA All-Star Game Events ==
=== 3-Point Shootout ===
Prior to the game, Randy Gill won the 3-Point Shootout.

=== Slam Dunk Contest ===
Prior to the game, Ray Cunningham won the Slam Dunk Contest.

=== The Game ===
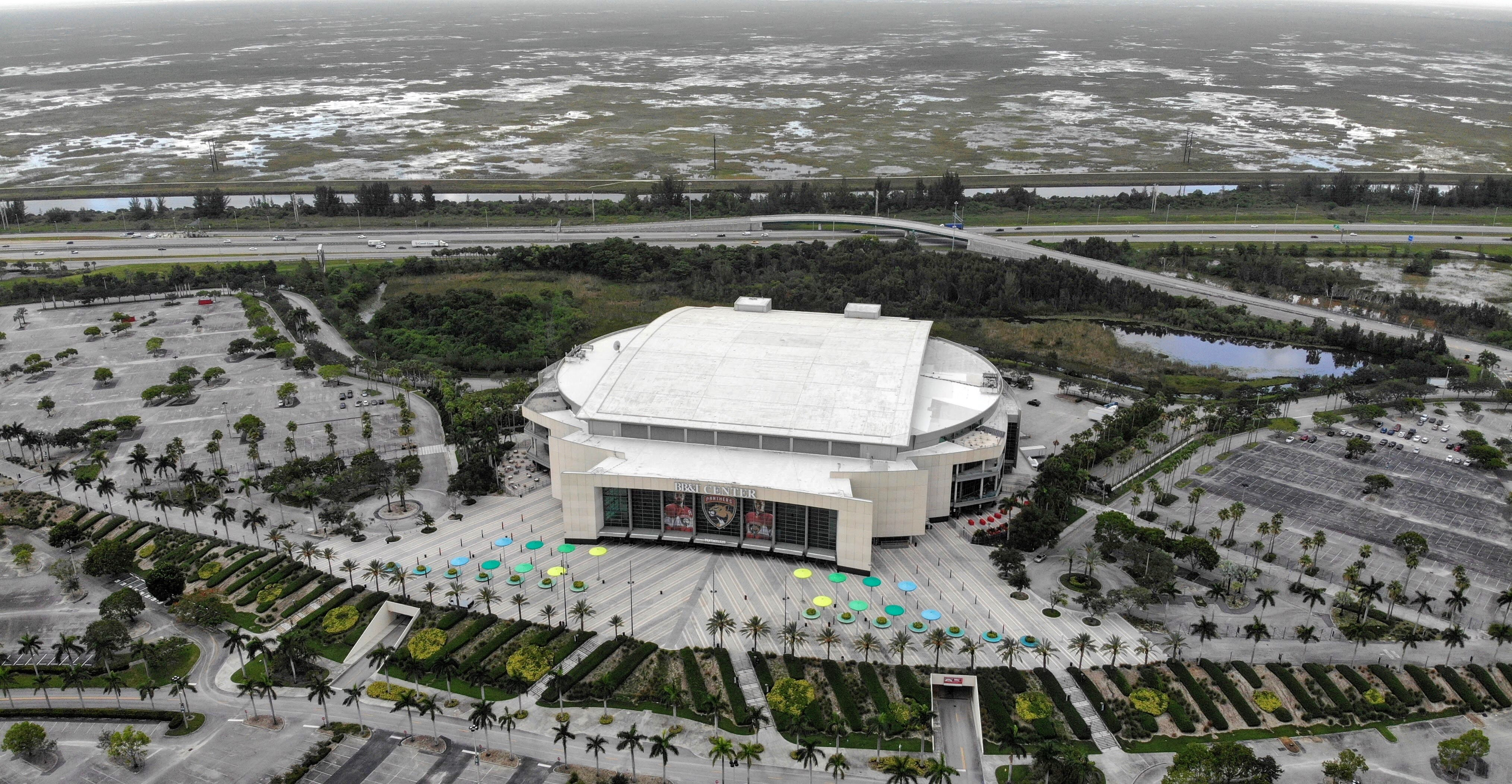
An aerial shot of Amerant Bank Arena (BankAtlantic Center)

Minutes after the start of the game the West All-Stars found themselves down 20-4 and the East All-Stars maintained the wide margin throughout the first half and early into the second half. East held a 23-point lead at 88–65 with six minutes left in the third quarter. West All-Stars led by Caleb Gervin outscored the East 32–15 in the remainder of the third quarter which finished 103–99.The East and West played even through the fourth quarter, with the West still leading by seven, 127–120 with two minutes left in the game.

The East then went on a 9–0 run over the next 1:23 to regain the lead at 129–127 with 37 seconds left and this remained until the end of the game as Caleb Gervin missed his game-winning three-point attempt at the buzzer. Former NBA player Armen Gilliam of the Pittsburgh Xplosion was named the MVP of the game with 29 points.

Both teams were coached by former NBA players. The East team was coached by Greg Graham of the Indiana Alley Cats, while the West team was coached Gary Grant of the SoCal Legends. Chinese players Huang Haibei and Sun Yue of Beijing Aoshen Olympian were the only non-Americans of the event.

== All-Star teams ==
=== Rosters ===
East All-Stars
Pos.	Player	Team	Appearance
Starters
G	Chandler Thompson	Indiana Alley Cats	
F	Chris Carrawell	Rochester Razorsharks	
F	Terence Shelman	Florida Pit Bulls	
F	Armon Gilliam	Pittsburgh Xplosion	
C	Lawrence Moten	Maryland Nighthawks	
Reserves
G	Tim Hardaway	Florida Pit Bulls	
G	Tim Winn	Buffalo Rapids	
G	(Canada) Manix Auriantal	(Canada) Montreal Matrix	
G	Kaz Nakagawa	Tampa Bay Strong Dogs	
G	Jamal Staten	Toledo Ice	
C	Derrick Russell	Birmingham Magicians	
F	Cedric McGinnis	Atlanta Vision	
F	Ray Cunningham	Maryland Nighthawks	
G	Shawn Fountain	Indiana Alley Cats	
Head coach: Greg Graham (Indiana Alley Cats); Assistant coaches: Rod Baker (Rochester Razorsharks) & Keith Williams (Maryland Nighthawks)

West All-Stars
Pos.	Player	Team	Appearance
Starters
G	(China) Sun Yue	(China) Beijing Aoshen Olympian	
G	Caleb Gervin	Bellingham Slam	
F	Jimmy Miggins	SoCal Legends	
F	Lamar Gayle	Carson Buzz	
F	Bernard McIntosh	Gallup Talons	
Reserves
G	Ramel Lloyd	Los Angeles Aftershock	
G	Tim Ellis	Tacoma Navigators	
G	Todd Okeson	San Jose Skyrockets	
F	William Funn	Gallup Talons	
F	Rio Logan	Fresno Heatwave	
C	(China) Huang Haibei	(China) Beijing Aoshen Olympian	
C	Jason Smith	San Jose Skyrockets	
F	Will Burr	Los Angeles Aftershock	
G	Kenny Brunner	SoCal Legends	
Head coach: Gary Grant (SoCal Legends); Assistant coaches: Clayton Shields (Gallup Talons) & Kermit Young (San Jose Skyrockets)

== Former NBA players ==
- Tim Hardaway
- Armon Gilliam
- Lawrence Moten
- Greg Graham
- Gary Grant

== See also ==
- 2007 ABA All-Star Game
