= Buffalo Sharks =

Basketball team in New York, 2005–2008

- Founded: 2005; 21 years ago
- Folded: 2008; 18 years ago
- League: ABA
- Conference: Blue
- Division: Connie Hawkins; 2005–2006; North; 2006–2007
- Team history: Buffalo Rapids; 2005–2006; Buffalo Silverbacks; 2006–2007; Buffalo Sharks; 2008
- Based in: Buffalo, New York
- Arena: Burt Flickinger Center; 2005; Park School of Buffalo; 2005–2006; Buffalo State Sports Arena; 2006–2007
- Colors: Blue, blue, white 2005–2006 Red, black, silver 2006–2007 Blue, red, white 2008
- Owner: Gary Nice; 2005; Dan Robbie & Todd Wier; 2005–2007; Vincent Lesh; 2007–2008
- Head coach: Richard Jacob; 2005–2006, 2008; Trevor Ruffin; 2006–2007
- General manager: Richard Jacob; 2005–2006, 2008
- Captain: Tim Winn; 2005–2006
- Overall record: 29–29 (.500)
- Playoff berths: 2 (2006, 2007)
- Cheerleaders: Buffalo Rush; 2005–2006
- Dancers: WBLK Sweet Divas; 2006–2007
- Main sponsor: Shark Energy; 2008

The Buffalo Sharks were a basketball team based in Buffalo, New York. The team competed in the American Basketball Association (ABA) as the Buffalo Rapids in 2005–06 and as the Buffalo Silverbacks in 2006–07 before suspending operations.

The organization rebranded as the Buffalo Sharks with plans to relaunch for the 2008–09 ABA season, but ownership instead folded the team.

Its legacy remains as the city's first basketball franchise to operate after the Buffalo Braves relocated to San Diego following the 1977–78 NBA season. Despite ownership changes and financial struggles, the team reached the ABA playoffs in both of its seasons.

== History ==
=== 2004: Franchise acquisition ===
Gary Nice paid $10,000 to acquire the rights for a Buffalo franchise of the American Basketball Association in August 2004. Nice was CEO of Events Media International, a company that had worked with the league to broadcast its games nationally on radio and television.

Buffalo Destroyers owner Mark Hamister disputed the purchase, as he had paid $75,000 to the league for the city's franchise rights in January 2000. However, he had been unable to come to terms with HSBC Arena management to utilize their venue for the inaugural 2000–01 ABA season. Hamister had been quoted a price of $41,000 per night to rent HSBC Arena, which he found unacceptable.

After Hamister departed Buffalo in 2003, the league ruled in 2004 that his two-year contractual window to found a team had lapsed, allowing Gary Nice's plans to move forward.

=== 2005–2006: Buffalo Rapids ===
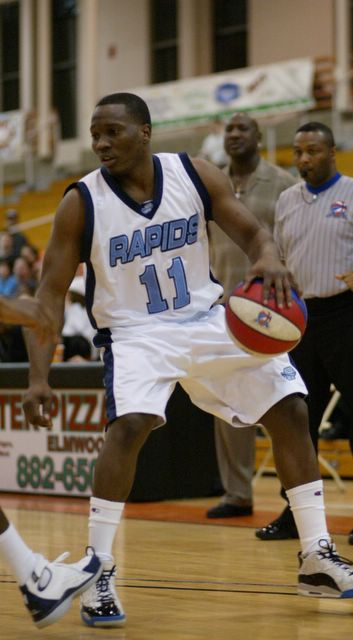
Tim Winn, ABA All-Star and All-ABA selection in 2006

The Buffalo Rapids were unveiled in February 2005 after an online contest to name the team. Buffalo Braves won the voting, but along with the second-place Buffalo Wings could not be used due to existing trademarks. The team did adopt Carolina blue uniforms reminiscent of the Columbia blue uniforms worn by the Buffalo Braves.

Richard Jacob was named the team's head coach and general manager in April 2005. Kareem Abdul-Jabbar and Kevin Cadle were also considered for the position. Bob Bateson was hired as the team's strength and conditioning coach.

Tryouts for the team were held at Daemen College in June 2005. Tryouts for the Buffalo Rush cheerleading squad were held at Medaille College in June 2005.

Tim Winn and Trevor Ruffin were announced as the team's first signings in June 2005.

The team played the 2005–06 ABA season in the Connie Hawkins Division of the Blue Conference. 400 season ticket packages were sold for the team's home matchups at Burt Flickinger Center, with the organization agreeing to rent the facility at a cost of $9,540 per night. Their inaugural game was a 107–108 home loss to the Maryland Nighthawks in front of 3,200 fans on November 3, 2005.

Gary Nice was removed as owner of the team in December 2005 after failing to make payroll, forcing the team's relocation from Burt Flickinger Center to Park School of Buffalo. Former Miami Dolphins owner Dan Robbie and his business partner Todd Wier became co-owners after purchasing the franchise that same month.

Antoine Sims scored 52 points in the team's 136–90 victory over the Boston Frenzy on February 3, 2006. This tied the record for most points scored professionally by a Buffalo player, which was set by Bob McAdoo of the Buffalo Braves in 1974.

Tim Winn was named to the 2006 ABA All-Star Game and 2006 All-ABA Team after averaging 25 points, 11 assists and 4 steals on the season.

The team finished with an 11–17 record and was eliminated in the quarterfinal round of the 2005–06 ABA playoffs by the Atlanta Vision. Kenneth Massey ranked the team 18th overall out of 47 teams in his final ABA ratings of the season.

=== 2006–2007: Buffalo Silverbacks ===
Buffalo Silverbacks logo
May 2006–September 2006

Buffalo Silverbacks logo
October 2006–September 2007

It was announced in May 2006 that the franchise had changed its name to the Buffalo Silverbacks. The rebranding was necessary because Gary Nice retained ownership of the Buffalo Rapids trademark when he left the organization.

Controversy arose when politician Betty Jean Grant criticized the team's name and logo, which featured a silverback gorilla, as racist. The team responded by adopting a new logo featuring a tiger.

All-Star Tim Winn was released in August 2006 after owner Dan Robbie required him to tryout again for the team, and he refused. Winn had no-showed a team-sponsored youth clinic in Olean, New York the month prior in protest.

Dayshawn Wright, the first overall pick in the 2006 CBA Draft, was signed to the team in September 2006 before breaching his contract a week later to instead sign with the CBA's Minot SkyRockets.

Head coach Richard Jacob resigned from the team in November 2006 and was replaced by Trevor Ruffin.

The team played the 2006–07 ABA season in the North Division of the Blue Conference. Their season opener was a 100–109 loss to the Detroit Panthers on November 8, 2006, drawing 1,232 fans to their new home of Buffalo State Sports Arena.

Antoine Sims was named to the 2007 ABA All-Star Game after leading the team with 28 points per game. Modie Cox was recipient of the league's inaugural Community Service Award.

The team finished with a 16–10 record and was eliminated in the semifinal round of the 2006–07 ABA playoffs by the Beijing Aoshen Olympians. Kenneth Massey ranked the team 6th overall out of 49 teams in his final ABA ratings of the season.

Dan Robbie and Todd Wier sold the franchise to concert promoter Vincent Lesh for $15,000 in September 2007, and the team sat out the 2007–08 ABA season for reorganization. Robbie and Wier claimed losses of $700,000 in their two seasons of ownership.

=== 2008: Buffalo Sharks ===
It was announced in May 2008 that the franchise had changed its name to the Buffalo Sharks. The name and logo referenced the team's primary sponsor, Shark Energy.

Rich Jacob returned as head coach and general manager, leading a makeshift Buffalo Select All-Stars squad to a 62–54 exhibition victory over the Italy men's national basketball team on June 23, 2008. The team was led by Ejike Ugboaja with 16 points and Jason Rowe with 7 assists.

Vincent Lesh secured Koessler Center as the team's home venue for the 2008–09 ABA season. However, Lesh announced in September 2008 that he was folding the Sharks and instead leaving the ABA to purchase Todd Wier's Buffalo Dragons franchise in the PBL.

== Personnel ==
=== 2005–2006 ===
Buffalo Rapids roster
Players

| Pos. | No. | Player | Height | Weight | DOB | From |
|---|---|---|---|---|---|---|
| F | 42 | Jean-Paul Afif | 6 ft 9 in (2.06 m) | 240 lb (109 kg) | 1980-03-30 | Loyola Marymount |
| G | 25 | Turner Battle | 6 ft 3 in (1.91 m) | 190 lb (86 kg) | 1983-01-11 | SUNY Buffalo |
| F | 21 | Mark Bortz | 6 ft 10 in (2.08 m) | 255 lb (116 kg) | 1982-12-23 | SUNY Buffalo |
| F | 24 | Carlton Brown | 6 ft 6 in (1.98 m) | 210 lb (95 kg) | 1979-03-24 | Texas A&M |
| F | 34 | Brad Buddenborg | 6 ft 5 in (1.96 m) | 210 lb (95 kg) | 1979-02-18 | Oakland |
| F | 4 | Andrew Bush | 6 ft 8 in (2.03 m) | 225 lb (102 kg) | 1979-08-02 | Canisius |
| G | 33 | Willie Chandler | 6 ft 4 in (1.93 m) | 215 lb (98 kg) | 1980-03-16 | Misericordia |
| G | 12 | Modie Cox | 5 ft 11 in (1.80 m) | 165 lb (75 kg) | 1972-12-29 | SUNY Buffalo |
| G/F | 9 | Marlin Johnson | 6 ft 4 in (1.93 m) | 220 lb (100 kg) | 1975-02-04 | Monroe CC |
| F | 20 | Kevin Ross | 6 ft 9 in (2.06 m) | 235 lb (107 kg) | 1979-07-08 | Cleveland State |
| F | 18 | DeRon Rutledge | 6 ft 6 in (1.98 m) | 225 lb (102 kg) | 1975-10-15 | Texas A&M–Kingsville |
| G | 8 | Antoine Sims | 5 ft 10 in (1.78 m) | 180 lb (82 kg) | 1977-05-?? | Johnson C. Smith |
| C | 44 | Johnny Tyson | 6 ft 11 in (2.11 m) | 245 lb (111 kg) | 1971-08-15 | Central Oklahoma |
| G | 11 | Tim Winn (C) | 5 ft 9 in (1.75 m) | 185 lb (84 kg) | 1977-06-27 | St. Bonaventure |

Coaches
Head coach
- Richard Jacob
Assistant(s)
- Tim Winn
- Modie Cox
- Bob Bateson

Legend
- (DP) Unsigned draft pick
- (FA) Free agent
- (S) Suspended
- Injured

Roster
Updated: February 9, 2006

=== 2006–2007 ===
Buffalo Silverbacks roster
Players

| Pos. | No. | Player | Height | Weight | DOB | From |
|---|---|---|---|---|---|---|
| G | 18 | Kenny Brunner | 5 ft 10 in (1.78 m) | 190 lb (86 kg) | 1978-12-08 | Georgetown |
| F/C | 42 | Andrew Bush | 6 ft 8 in (2.03 m) | 240 lb (109 kg) | 1979-08-02 | Canisius |
| G | 11 | Lamar Castile | 6 ft 2 in (1.88 m) | 220 lb (100 kg) | 1982-08-18 | Beaver County CC |
| C | 33 | Keith Closs | 7 ft 3 in (2.21 m) | 240 lb (109 kg) | 1976-04-03 | Central Connecticut |
| G | 12 | Modie Cox | 5 ft 11 in (1.80 m) | 165 lb (75 kg) | 1972-12-29 | SUNY Buffalo |
| G/F | 31 | Kueth Duany | 6 ft 7 in (2.01 m) | 205 lb (93 kg) | 1980-04-22 | Syracuse |
| G/F | 24 | Marlin Johnson | 6 ft 4 in (1.93 m) | 215 lb (98 kg) | 1975-02-04 | Monroe CC |
| G/F | 20 | Todd Jones | 6 ft 6 in (1.98 m) | 205 lb (93 kg) | 1978-12-02 | CSU Bakersfield |
| G/F | 34 | Sean Murphy | 6 ft 3 in (1.91 m) | 235 lb (107 kg) | 1983-07-29 | RIT |
| F | 32 | Kevin Ross | 6 ft 9 in (2.06 m) | 240 lb (109 kg) | 1979-07-08 | Cleveland State |
| G | 5 | David Ruffin | 6 ft 4 in (1.93 m) | 200 lb (91 kg) | 1984-02-14 | Hartford |
| G | 10 | Dameon Sansom | 6 ft 1 in (1.85 m) | 185 lb (84 kg) | 1975-05-28 | Texas State |
| G | 23 | Antoine Sims | 5 ft 10 in (1.78 m) | 180 lb (82 kg) | 1977-05-?? | Johnson C. Smith |
| F/C | 44 | Johnny Tyson | 6 ft 11 in (2.11 m) | 235 lb (107 kg) | 1971-08-15 | Central Oklahoma |

Coaches
Head coach
- Trevor Ruffin
Assistant(s)
- Modie Cox

Legend
- (DP) Unsigned draft pick
- (FA) Free agent
- (S) Suspended
- Injured

Roster
Updated: February 4, 2007

== Season-by-season record ==
| ABA champions | Conference champions | Division champions | Playoff berth |

| Season | Conference | Finish | Division | Finish | Wins | Losses | Win% | GB | Playoffs | Awards | Head coach | Ref. |
|---|---|---|---|---|---|---|---|---|---|---|---|---|
| 2005–06 | Blue | 17th | Connie Hawkins | 3rd | 11 | 17 | .393 | — | Won Wild Card (Frenzy) 133–88; Lost quarterfinal (Vision) 97–99 | Tim Winn (All-Star, All-ABA) | Richard Jacob | |
| 2006–07 | Blue | 12th | North | 3rd | 16 | 10 | .615 | — | Won quarterfinal (Jam) 100–91; Lost semifinal (Olympians) 106–121 | Antoine Sims (All-Star); Modie Cox (Community Service) | Trevor Ruffin | |

== Game log ==
=== 2005–2006 ===
==== Regular season ====
2005–06 game log
Total: 11–17 (Home: 6–7; Road: 5–10)
November: 2–5 (home: 2–2; road: 0–3)

| Game | Date | Team | Score | High points | High rebounds | High assists | Location Attendance | Record |
|---|---|---|---|---|---|---|---|---|
| 1 | November 3 | Maryland | L 107–108 | Carlton Brown (17) | | | Burt Flickinger Center; 3,200 | 0–1 |
| 2 | November 5 | @ Rochester | L 88–89 | Tim Winn (29) | | | Blue Cross Arena | 0–2 |
| 3 | November 11 | @ Montreal | L 74–94 | Kevin Ross (22) | | | Centre Pierre Charbonneau | 0–3 |
| 4 | November 14 | Harlem | W 97–90 | Trevor Ruffin (32) | | | Burt Flickinger Center; 2,000 | 1–3 |
| 5 | November 19 | @ Maryland | L 102–132 | Tim Winn (20) | | Tim Winn (10) | Montgomery College | 1–4 |
| 6 | November 26 | Montreal | W 104–94 | Tim Winn (26) | | | Niagara Catholic High School | 2–4 |
| 7 | November 29 | Maryland | L 112–113 (OT) | Tim Winn (34) | Carlton Brown (11); Kevin Ross (11) | | Park School of Buffalo | 2–5 |

December: 4–4 (home: 2–1; road: 2–3)

| Game | Date | Team | Score | High points | High rebounds | High assists | Location Attendance | Record |
|---|---|---|---|---|---|---|---|---|
| 8 | December 1 | @ Northeast Pennsylvania | L 86–95 | Tim Winn (29) | | | Lackawanna College | 2–6 |
| 9 | December 4 | @ Harlem | L 109–116 | | | | Hunter College | 2–7 |
| 10 | December 13 | Harlem | W 107–102 (OT) | Tim Winn (31) | | | Park School of Buffalo; 250 | 3–7 |
| 11 | December 17 | @ Maryland | L 94–110 | Brad Buddenborg (20) | | | Montgomery College | 3–8 |
| 12 | December 18 | @ Newark | W 89–88 | Tim Winn (23) | | | Essex County College | 4–8 |
| 13 | December 23 | Rochester | L 100–110 | Tim Winn (29) | | | Gow School | 4–9 |
| 14 | December 28 | Maryland | W 94–89 | Rashid Byrd (30) | | | Park School of Buffalo | 5–9 |
| 15 | December 30 | @ Montreal | W 98–86 | Brad Buddenborg (38) | | | Centre Pierre Charbonneau | 6–9 |

January: 2–3 (home: 0–1; road: 2–2)

| Game | Date | Team | Score | High points | High rebounds | High assists | Location Attendance | Record |
|---|---|---|---|---|---|---|---|---|
| 16 | January 7 | @ Boston | W 113–96 | | | | Barnstable High School | 7–9 |
| 17 | January 11 | Rochester | L 91–94 | Tim Winn (27) | | | Park School of Buffalo; 250 | 7–10 |
| 18 | January 14 | @ Strong Island | W 70–65 | Tim Winn (20) | | | St. Joseph's College | 8–10 |
| 19 | January 21 | @ Strong Island | L 107–123 | | | | St. Joseph's College | 8–11 |
| 20 | January 26 | @ Rochester | L 87–114 | Tim Winn (19) | | | Blue Cross Arena | 8–12 |

February: 1–4 (home: 1–3; road: 0–1)

| Game | Date | Team | Score | High points | High rebounds | High assists | Location Attendance | Record |
|---|---|---|---|---|---|---|---|---|
| 21 | February 1 | Montreal | L 127–132 (OT) | Johnny Tyson (40) | | | Park School of Buffalo | 8–13 |
| 22 | February 3 | Boston | W 136–90 | Antoine Sims (52) | | Turner Battle (13) | Park School of Buffalo | 9–13 |
| 23 | February 5 | Strong Island | L 100–128 | Turner Battle (23) | Carlton Brown (11) | | Park School of Buffalo | 9–14 |
| 24 | February 19 | Strong Island | L 101–102 | DeRon Rutledge (31) | | | Park School of Buffalo | 9–15 |
| 25 | February 25 | @ Boston | W 117–104 | Tim Winn (20) | | | Barnstable High School | 10–15 |

March: 1–2 (home: 1–0; road: 0–2)

| Game | Date | Team | Score | High points | High rebounds | High assists | Location Attendance | Record |
|---|---|---|---|---|---|---|---|---|
| 26 | March 4 | @ Harlem | L 96–103 | | | | Hunter College | 10–16 |
| 27 | March 5 | Newark | W 112–104 | Willie Chandler (21) | | | Buffalo State Sports Arena; 1,500 | 11–16 |
| 28 | March 7 | @ Rochester | L 95–106 | | | | Blue Cross Arena | 11–17 |

==== Playoffs ====
2006 playoff game log
Total: 1–1 (home: 1–0; road: 0–1)
Wild Card (#15 seed): 1–0 (home: 1–0; road: 0–0)

| Game | Date | Team | Score | High points | High rebounds | High assists | Location Attendance | Series |
|---|---|---|---|---|---|---|---|---|
| 1 | March 12 | Boston (#16) | W 133–88 | Johnny Tyson (29) | | Tim Winn (14) | Hilbert College | 1–0 |

Quarterfinals (#15 seed): 0–1 (home: 0–0; road: 0–1)

| Game | Date | Team | Score | High points | High rebounds | High assists | Location Attendance | Series |
|---|---|---|---|---|---|---|---|---|
| 1 | March 17 | @ Atlanta (#7) | L 97–99 | Johnny Tyson (19) | | | New Birth Missionary Baptist Church | 0–1 |

=== 2006–2007 ===
==== Regular season ====
2006–07 game log
Total: 16–10 (Home: 10–3; Road: 6–7)
November: 2–4 (home: 2–1; road: 0–3)

| Game | Date | Team | Score | High points | High rebounds | High assists | Location Attendance | Record |
|---|---|---|---|---|---|---|---|---|
| 1 | November 8 | Detroit | L 100–109 | Antoine Sims (33) | Todd Jones (7) | Antoine Sims (7) | Buffalo State Sports Arena; 1,232 | 0–1 |
| 2 | November 12 | @ Detroit | L 113–128 | Antoine Sims (24) | | | Buck Weeber Center | 0–2 |
| 3 | November 16 | @ Rochester | L 93–107 | Dameon Sansom (23) | | | Blue Cross Arena | 0–3 |
| 4 | November 18 | @ Vermont | L 100–110 | Johnny Tyson (27) | | | Burlington Memorial Auditorium | 0–4 |
| 5 | November 24 | Rochester | W 96–93 | Antoine Sims (29) | | | Buffalo State Sports Arena | 1–4 |
| 6 | November 30 | Hammond | W 120–104 | Antoine Sims (19) | | | Buffalo State Sports Arena | 2–4 |

December: 5–3 (home: 5–1; road: 0–2)

| Game | Date | Team | Score | High points | High rebounds | High assists | Location Attendance | Record |
|---|---|---|---|---|---|---|---|---|
| 7 | December 8 | Detroit | W 119–104 | Antoine Sims (24) | | | Buffalo State Sports Arena | 3–4 |
| 8 | December 9 | @ Rochester | L 90–109 | Marlin Johnson (18) | | | Blue Cross Arena | 3–5 |
| 9 | December 13 | Richmond | W 119–97 | Antoine Sims (22) | | | Buffalo State Sports Arena | 4–5 |
| 10 | December 14 | Richmond | W 123–116 | Kevin Ross (25) | | | Buffalo State Sports Arena | 5–5 |
| 11 | December 15 | @ Detroit | L 104–110 | Antoine Sims (21) | | | Buck Weeber Center | 5–6 |
| 12 | December 20 | Rochester | L 102–107 | Antoine Sims (33) | | | Buffalo State Sports Arena | 5–7 |
| 13 | December 29 | Cape Cod | W 118–110 | Johnny Tyson (28) | Johnny Tyson (12) | | Buffalo State Sports Arena | 6–7 |
| 14 | December 30 | @ Quebec City | W 110–98 | Lamar Castile (29) | | | Buffalo State Sports Arena | 7–7 |

January: 3–3 (home: 1–1; road: 2–2)

| Game | Date | Team | Score | High points | High rebounds | High assists | Location Attendance | Record |
|---|---|---|---|---|---|---|---|---|
| 15 | January 5 | Rochester | L 94–96 | Lamar Castile (30) | | | Buffalo State Sports Arena | 7–8 |
| 16 | January 10 | @ Vermont | L 90–92 | Lamar Castile (29) | | | Burlington Memorial Auditorium | 7–9 |
| 17 | January 13 | @ Toledo | W 152–138 | Lamar Castile (33) | | | Libbey High School | 8–9 |
| 18 | January 18 | Detroit | W 103–95 | Lamar Castile (25) | | | Buffalo State Sports Arena | 9–9 |
| 19 | January 19 | @ Jacksonville | L 96–105 | Lamar Castile (25) | | | UNF Arena | 9–10 |
| 20 | January 21 | @ Maryland | W 114–108 | Dameon Sansom (31) | | | Montgomery College | 10–10 |

February: 4–0 (home: 2–0; road: 2–0)

| Game | Date | Team | Score | High points | High rebounds | High assists | Location Attendance | Record |
|---|---|---|---|---|---|---|---|---|
| 21 | February 9 | @ Quebec City | W 91–79 | Antoine Sims (23) | | | Université Laval | 11–10 |
| 22 | February 10 | @ Montreal | W 99–76 | Kueth Duany (18) | | | Centre Pierre Charbonneau | 12–10 |
| 23 | February 21 | Vermont | W 100–95 | Lamar Castile (45) | | | Iroquois High School | 13–10 |
| 24 | February 22 | Detroit | W 116–102 | Antoine Sims (38) | | | Park School of Buffalo | 14–10 |

March: 2–0 (home: 0–0; road: 2–0)

| Game | Date | Team | Score | High points | High rebounds | High assists | Location Attendance | Record |
|---|---|---|---|---|---|---|---|---|
| 25 | March 9 | @ Montreal | W 102–99 | Lamar Castile (34) | | | Centre Pierre Charbonneau | 15–10 |
| 26 | March 10 | @ Quebec City | W 120–107 | Lamar Castile (38) | | | Université Laval | 16–10 |

==== Playoffs ====
2007 playoff game log
Total: 1–1 (home: 0–0; road: 1–1)
Quarterfinals (#12 seed): 1–0 (home: 0–0; road: 1–0)

| Game | Date | Team | Score | High points | High rebounds | High assists | Location Attendance | Series |
|---|---|---|---|---|---|---|---|---|
| 1 | March 16 | @ Jacksonville (#2) | W 100–91 | Lamar Castile (37) | Lamar Castile (10) | | UNF Arena | 1–0 |

Semifinals (#12 seed): 0–1 (home: 0–0; road: 0–1)

| Game | Date | Team | Score | High points | High rebounds | High assists | Location Attendance | Series |
|---|---|---|---|---|---|---|---|---|
| 1 | March 22 | @ Beijing (#7) | L 106–121 | Antoine Sims (30) | | | Felix Events Center | 0–1 |

== Player statistics ==
=== 2006–2007 ===
Legend
| GP | Games played | GS | Games started | MPG | Minutes per game |
| FG% | Field-goal percentage | 3P% | 3-point field-goal percentage | FT% | Free-throw percentage |
| RPG | Rebounds per game | APG | Assists per game | SPG | Steals per game |
| BPG | Blocks per game | PPG | Points per game |

After all games.

Buffalo Silverbacks statistics
| Player | GP | GS | MPG | FG% | 3P% | FT% | RPG | APG | SPG | BPG | PPG |
|---|---|---|---|---|---|---|---|---|---|---|---|
| Ka'Ron Barnes^{≠‡} | – | – | 16.4 | .444 | .353 | .333 | 1.6 | 2.1 | 0.7 | 0.0 | 6.0 |
| Kenny Brunner^{≠} | – | – | 33.0 | .300 | .000 | .435 | 3.7 | 4.7 | 2.7 | 1.0 | 6.5 |
| Andrew Bush | – | – | 6.7 | .429 | .000 | .500 | 1.7 | 0.0 | 0.0 | 0.3 | 2.5 |
| Lamar Castile | – | – | 27.7 | .435 | .306 | .800 | 4.5 | 2.7 | 2.1 | 0.2 | 20.3 |
| Keith Closs^{≠} | – | – | 37.0 | .462 | .000 | .700 | 6.0 | 2.3 | 1.0 | 3.3 | 6.3 |
| Modie Cox | – | – | 23.1 | .553 | .667 | .613 | 4.3 | 3.3 | 2.4 | 0.1 | 6.8 |
| Kueth Duany | – | – | 27.2 | .477 | .531 | .692 | 6.7 | 1.3 | 1.2 | 0.7 | 19.0 |
| Marlin Johnson | – | – | 28.9 | .514 | .333 | .606 | 7.3 | 3.8 | 2.6 | 0.5 | 9.6 |
| Todd Jones | – | – | 24.6 | .452 | .310 | .746 | 5.5 | 1.7 | 1.2 | 0.2 | 9.6 |
| Sean Murphy | – | – | 6.5 | .333 | .500 | .750 | 1.7 | 0.3 | 0.0 | 0.0 | 2.0 |
| Kevin Ross | – | – | 25.1 | .523 | .000 | .613 | 6.9 | 1.3 | 0.9 | 0.9 | 10.4 |
| David Ruffin | – | – | 10.1 | .371 | .316 | .800 | 1.5 | 0.8 | 1.0 | 0.1 | 5.8 |
| Dameon Sansom | – | – | 15.3 | .368 | .268 | .750 | 0.8 | 1.1 | 0.5 | 0.1 | 6.1 |
| Antoine Sims | – | – | 31.2 | .388 | .320 | .836 | 2.4 | 3.2 | 2.7 | 0.4 | 23.1 |
| Victor Venters^{≠‡} | – | – | 11.5 | .500 | 1.000 | .688 | 3.2 | 0.8 | 0.8 | 0.2 | 5.0 |

^{‡}Waived during the season
^{†}Traded during the season
^{≠}Acquired during the season
