= Richard Jacob =

American basketball coach (born 1958)

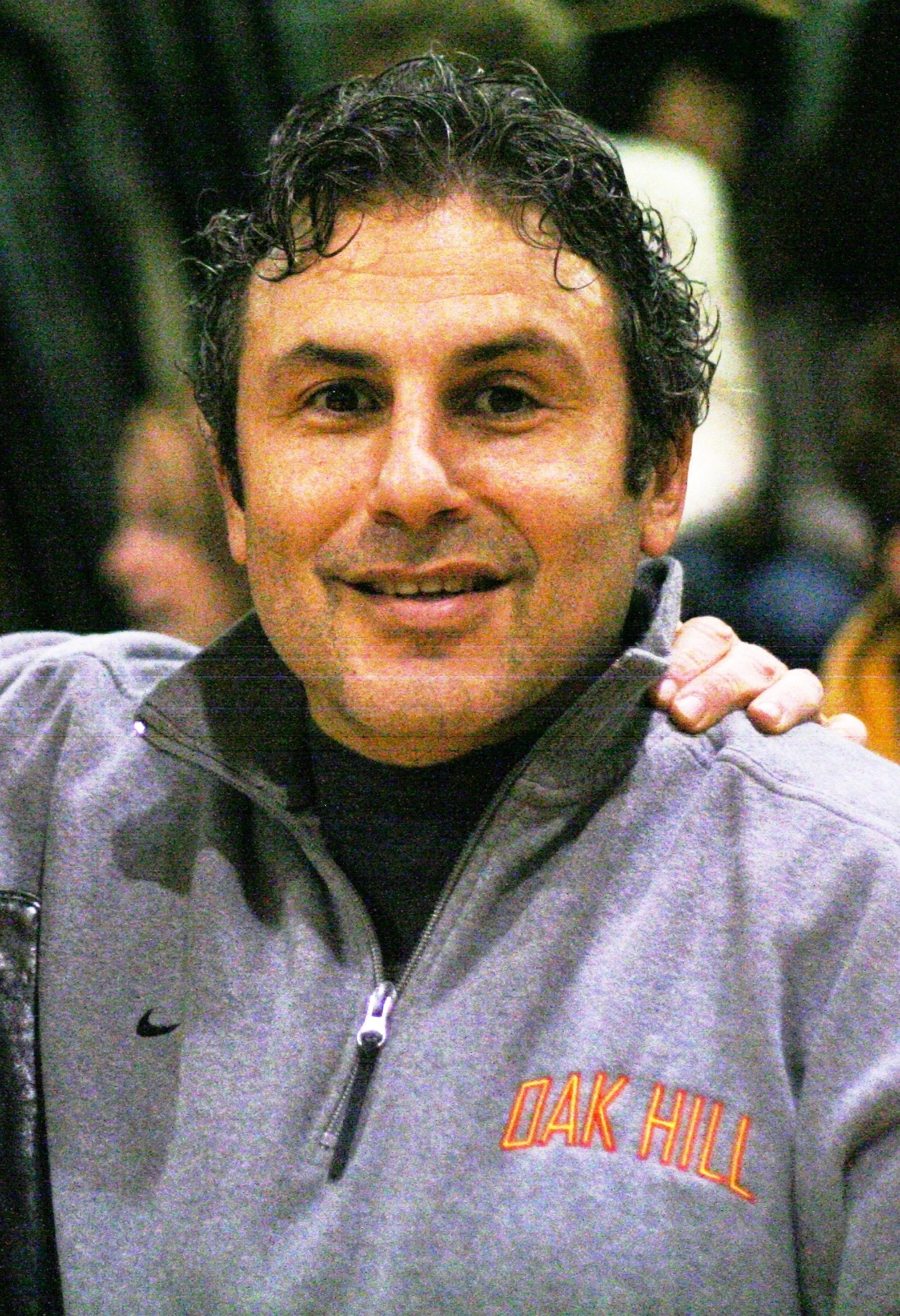
- Jacob in 2009

Personal information
- Born: September 24, 1958 (age 68) Niagara Falls, New York, U.S.

Career information
- High school: Niagara Catholic (Niagara Falls, New York)
- College: NCCC (1976–1978)
- Playing career: 1976–1978
- Position: Point guard
- Number: 20
- Coaching career: 1980–2025

Career history

Playing
- 1976–1978: NCCC

Coaching
- 1980–1981: La Salle HS (JV)
- 1981–1982: Niagara (GA)
- 1982–1983: Daemen
- 1983–1987: Buffalo (assistant)
- 1987–1989: Daemen
- 1989–1991: Villa Maria
- 1993–1995: NCCC
- 1996–2004: Medaille
- 2004–2005: Buffalo State (assistant)
- 2005–2006: Buffalo Rapids
- 2008: Buffalo Sharks
- 2008: Buffalo Stampede
- 2010–2017: ECC (assistant)
- 2017–2021: Park School
- 2023–2025: Buffalo eXtreme

Career highlights
- As player: NJCAA Region III champion (1978); As coach: 2× CHSAA Class A champion (2018, 2019); New York State Class A champion (2018); Centercourt Coach of the Year (2018); 2× NJCAA Region III champion (2011, 2012); NEAC champion (2004); NEAC Coach of the Year (2004); NJCAA Penn-York Coach of the Year (1990)

Career coaching record
- ABA: 44–22 (.667)
- College: 164–230 (.416)
- High school: 68–14 (.829)
Medals
Head coach for Western Region
Empire State Games
Silver medal – second place	1989 Ithaca

Richard L. Jacob (born September 24, 1958) is an American basketball coach and educator. He is currently sport management consultant for Villa Maria College.

Jacob led two teams to the ABA playoffs at the professional level, including an appearance in the ABA Final Four. He won an NEAC championship at the collegiate level, and has been awarded Coach of the Year honors by both NEAC and NJCAA. For his work at Medaille College, he was named NSCAA Athletic Director of the Year. At the high school level he captured the New York State Class A championship, multiple CHSAA championships, and was awarded Centercourt Coach of the Year.

Jacob was head coach of New York State's Western Region team, leading them to a silver medal in the Empire State Games.

== Early life ==
Richard L. Jacob was born on September 24, 1958, in Niagara Falls, New York, son of Angeline (née Pullo) and restaurateur Joseph Jacob.

He graduated from Niagara Catholic High School in 1976, where he played basketball and was teammates with Scott Layden. Jacob graduated from Niagara County Community College with an associate's degree in arts and social sciences, playing for their 1977–78 men's basketball team which fell one game shy of a perfect season after losing the 1978 NJCAA Men's Division I Basketball Championship.

Jacob then graduated from Eisenhower College with a bachelor's degree in psychology, later obtaining master's degrees in educational counseling and physical education at Niagara University and Canisius College, respectively. He went on to receive his Doctor of Philosophy in counselor education from University at Buffalo.

== Coaching career ==
Jacob began his basketball coaching career as head coach of the junior varsity squad at La Salle High School. He began his college coaching career at Niagara University as graduate assistant coach under Pete Lonergan in 1981. He was head coach of Daemen College for their 1982–83 campaign. Jacob then served as assistant coach for University at Buffalo under Dan Bazzani from 1983 to 1987.

Jacob returned to Daemen College as head coach in 1987, replacing Nate Bliss mid-season. He left that job to become athletic director and head coach of Villa Maria College, where he was named NJCAA Penn-York Conference Coach of the Year for 1989–90 after leading the team to a 12–6 record. Jacob was head coach for the Western Region team of the Empire State Games from 1987 to 1990, leading his 1989 squad that included Duke University star Christian Laettner to a silver medal. In 1993, he became head coach at Niagara County Community College.

Jacob was hired as athletic director of Medaille College in 1995, and was named 1996–97 NSCAA Athletic Director of the Year after expanding their program from one sport to twelve. Jacob coached Medaille College from 1996 to 2004, with his 2003–04 team claiming the NEAC championship. He was consequently named 2003–04 NEAC Coach of the Year. Jacob served as assistant coach of Buffalo State College under Dick Bihr during their 2004–05 season.

In their inaugural season, Jacob coached the 2005–06 Buffalo Rapids to an American Basketball Association playoff berth. He left before their second season to focus on his teaching career at Medaille College. Jacob returned to the Rapids organization in 2008 (now renamed the Buffalo Sharks) and coached the team to an exhibition victory over the Italy men's national basketball team. After being named head coach and general manager for the Buffalo Stampede of the Premier Basketball League, he resigned before their 2009 season began. He served as assistant coach for Erie Community College under Alexander Nwora from 2010 to 2017, winning consecutive NJCAA Region III championships in 2010–11 and 2011–12.

Jacob was head coach of The Park School of Buffalo from 2017 to 2021, with his 2017–18 squad winning the New York State Class A championship, and consecutive CHSAA Class A titles in 2017–18 and 2018–19. He was named 2017–18 Centercourt Coach of the Year.

In their inaugural season, Jacob coached the 2023–24 Buffalo eXtreme to an American Basketball Association playoff berth. He then led the 2024–25 Buffalo eXtreme to an ABA Final Four appearance in his final season with the club.

== Personal life ==
Jacob is married to educator Rebecca Frandina and they have two children. His brother Matthew Jacob is a member of the Niagara Sports Hall of Fame.

He has worked as a special education counselor for BOCES and as a volunteer for the Special Olympics.

Jacob is godfather to National Basketball Association player Jordan Nwora. He serves on the Board of Directors for the Jordan Nwora Foundation, a nonprofit organization dedicated to teaching children the game of basketball.

In 2017 he authored John Tavares: Soul to the Goal, a biography of the National Lacrosse League Hall of Fame inductee.

== Head coaching record ==
=== ABA ===
Legend
Regular season	G	Games coached	W	Games won	L	Games lost	W–L %	Win–loss %
Playoffs	PG	Playoff games	PW	Playoff wins	PL	Playoff losses	PW–L %	Playoff win–loss %

Team	Year	G	W	L	W–L%	Finish	PG	PW	PL	PW–L%	Result
Buffalo Rapids	2005–06	28	11	17	.392	3rd in Connie Hawkins	2	1	1	.500	Lost in Quarterfinals
Buffalo eXtreme	2023–24	19	15	4	.789	2nd in White	2	1	1	.500	Lost in Division Finals
Buffalo eXtreme	2024–25	19	18	1	.944	1st in White	5	4	1	.800	Lost in League Semifinals
Career:		66	44	22	.667		9	6	3	.666	

=== College ===
Record table
Season	Team	Overall	Conference	Standing	Postseason
Daemen Warriors (Independent) (1982–1983)
1982–83	Daemen	3–14			
Daemen:		3–14 (.176)			
Daemen Warriors (National Association of Intercollegiate Athletics) (1987–1989)
1987–88	Daemen	4–9			
1988–89	Daemen	15–14			
Daemen:		19–23 (.452)			
Villa Maria Vikings (National Junior College Athletic Association) (1989–1990)
1989–90	Villa Maria	22–12	12–6	2nd	NJCAA Region III Runner-up
1990–91	Villa Maria	17–10	9–9		
Villa Maria:		39–22 (.639)	21–15 (.583)		
NCCC Trailblazers (National Junior College Athletic Association) (1993–1995)
1993–94	NCCC	3–19			
1994–95	NCCC	7–21			
NCCC:		10–40 (.200)			
Medaille Mavericks (National Small College Athletic Association) (1996–1998)
1996–97	Medaille	20–10			NSCAA (3rd place)
1997–98	Medaille	14–16			NSCAA (5th place)
Medaille:		34–26 (.567)			
Medaille Mavericks (North Eastern Athletic Conference) (1998–2004)
1998–99	Medaille	12–14			
1999–00	Medaille	18–12			
2000–01	Medaille	5–20			
2001–02	Medaille	3–22			
2002–03	Medaille	6–20	4–4	4th	NEAC Semifinalist
2003–04	Medaille	10–17	6–2	T–1st	NEAC Champion
Medaille:		59–105 (.360)	10–6 (.625)		
Total:		164–230 (.416)			
National champion Postseason invitational champion Conference regular season champion Conference regular season and conference tournament champion Division regular season champion Division regular season and conference tournament champion Conference tournament champion

=== High school ===
Record table
Season	Team	Overall	Conference	Standing	Postseason
Park School Pioneers (Monsignor Martin Athletic Association) (2017–2019)
2017–18	Park School	25–5	11–2	1st	New York State Class A champion CHSAA Class A champion
2018–19	Park School	25–3	12–0	1st	CHSAA Class A champion
Park School Pioneers (NYSPHSAA Section VI Independent) (2019–2020)
2019–20	Park School	18–6			Cancelled due to COVID-19 pandemic
Total:		68–14 (.829)			

== Coaching tree ==
Assistant coaches under Jacob who became collegiate or professional head coaches

- Alexander Nwora – ECC (1999–present), Cape Verde (2009–2013), Nigeria (2017–2019)
- Pete Lonergan – Medaille women (2003–2014)
- Dick Hack – Medaille (2004–2006), SUNY Maritime (2010–2012)
- Trevor Ruffin – Buffalo Silverbacks (2006–2007)
