= Armen Gilliam =

American basketball player (1964–2011)

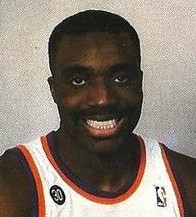
- Gilliam with the Phoenix Suns in 1987

Personal information
- Born: May 28, 1964 Bethel Park, Pennsylvania, U.S.
- Died: July 5, 2011 (aged 47) Bridgeville, Pennsylvania, U.S.
- Listed height: 6 ft 9 in (2.06 m)
- Listed weight: 230 lb (104 kg)

Career information
- High school: Bethel Park (Bethel Park, Pennsylvania)
- College: Independence CC (1982–1983); UNLV (1984–1987)
- NBA draft: 1987: 1st round, 2nd overall pick
- Drafted by: Phoenix Suns
- Playing career: 1987–2000, 2005–2006
- Position: Power forward
- Number: 35, 45, 43, 10, 5
- Coaching career: 2000–2005

Career history

Playing
- 1987–1989: Phoenix Suns
- 1989–1991: Charlotte Hornets
- 1991–1993: Philadelphia 76ers
- 1993–1996: New Jersey Nets
- 1996–1999: Milwaukee Bucks
- 2000: Utah Jazz
- 2005–2006: Pittsburgh Xplosion

Coaching
- 2000–2001: Mt. Lebanon HS (assistant)
- 2001–2002: Penn State McKeesport
- 2002–2005: Penn State Altoona

Career highlights
- NBA All-Rookie First Team (1988); ABA All-Star (2006); ABA All-Star Game MVP (2006); All-ABA Second Team (2006); Consensus second-team All-American (1987); PCAA Player of the Year (1987); First-team All-PCAA (1987); Second-team All-PCAA (1986); No. 35 retired by UNLV Runnin' Rebels

Career NBA statistics
- Points: 12,700 (13.7 ppg)
- Rebounds: 6,401 (6.9 rpg)
- Assists: 1,088 (1.2 apg)
- Stats at NBA.com
- Stats at Basketball Reference
Medals
Men's basketball
Representing United States
FIBA World Championship
Gold medal – first place	1986 Spain	National team

Armen Louis Gilliam (born Armon Louis Gilliam; May 28, 1964 – July 5, 2011) was an American professional basketball player who played 13 years in the National Basketball Association (NBA) from 1987 to 2000. He also played one season for the Pittsburgh Xplosion of the American Basketball Association. Gilliam returned to the court after retirement as the head basketball coach for the (NCAA) Division III Penn State Altoona Lions from 2002 to 2005.

== College career ==
Gilliam began his college basketball career in 1982–83 at Independence Junior College in Independence, Kansas. That year, Gilliam was a standout player on the basketball team that reached the Junior College Finals and finished sixth in the nation. Gilliam averaged 24.9 points and 14 rebounds in five tournament games and was named to the National Junior college finals all-tournament team.

Gilliam continued his college basketball career with UNLV. Gilliam played for UNLV from 1984 to 1987 and was an integral part of a team that was 93–11 in the three years he played for the Rebels. The UNLV team was ranked number one in the country for most of the three years Gilliam competed and the team made it to the NCAA tournament every year during his stay. In 1987, the team reached the Final Four and Gilliam was named to the NCAA Final Four all-tournament team. Gilliam scored 998 points in his senior year, which remains a school record for the most points scored in a season by a UNLV player. Gilliam also played on the UNLV team that won 38 games in a season, which is still an NCAA Division 1 record for most wins in a season. In 1987, Gilliam was selected for a number of All-American Teams and voted the top contender for the John Wooden award. While at UNLV, teammate Frank James gave him the nickname "The Hammer" after seeing Gilliam's biceps combined with his pounding action under the basket. Gilliam said, "He knew I was from a steel town, too. I think that was a factor." The Los Angeles Times dismissed the notion that he got the name from a baking powder, Arm & Hammer.

Gilliam was selected to play in the 1986 World Championships. The team fielded college standouts such as David Robinson, Kenny Smith, Tommy Amaker, Tom Hammonds, Charles D. Smith and Derrick McKey and coached by Lute Olson of Arizona, proceeded to shock the world with its play. The international community did not consider the team a medal-contender, but they advanced to the championship game and competed against the heavily favored Russians for the gold medal; overcoming great odds, they won the tournament.

== Professional career ==
After graduating from UNLV with a degree in communications, Gilliam was the second pick in the first round of the 1987 NBA draft. Gilliam was named to the NBA All-Rookie First Team in 1988 while playing for the Phoenix Suns. He went on to play 13 years in the NBA. Gilliam averaged 20 points and 9 rebounds for the Charlotte Hornets, played three years with the Philadelphia 76ers, and played three years with the New Jersey Nets, where he averaged between 12 and 18 points and 6 to 9 rebounds a game. He later played for the Milwaukee Bucks and finally the Utah Jazz.

Gilliam came out of retirement in 2005 to play for the Pittsburgh Xplosion of the American Basketball Association (ABA). He averaged 23 points and 9 rebounds per game during the 2005–06 season. Gilliam was selected as the Most Valuable Player of the 2006 ABA All-Star Game and named to the All-ABA Second Team.

== NBA career statistics ==
Legend
GP	Games played	GS	Games started	MPG	Minutes per game
FG%	Field goal percentage	3P%	3-point field goal percentage	FT%	Free throw percentage
RPG	Rebounds per game	APG	Assists per game	SPG	Steals per game
BPG	Blocks per game	PPG	Points per game	**Bold**	Career high
*	Led the league

=== Regular season ===
Year	Team	GP	GS	MPG	FG%	3P%	FT%	RPG	APG	SPG	BPG	PPG
1987–88	Phoenix	55	53	32.9	.475	.000	.679	7.9	1.3	1.1	0.5	14.8
1988–89	Phoenix	74	60	28.6	.503	.000	.743	7.3	0.7	0.7	0.4	15.9
1989–90	Phoenix	16	7	16.7	.430	.000	.696	4.4	0.5	0.4	0.3	8.9
1989–90	Charlotte	60	59	36.0	**.527**	.000	.727	8.8	1.5	1.1	0.8	18.8
1990–91	Charlotte	25	25	**38.0**	.513	.000	.813	**9.4**	1.1	**1.4**	0.8	**19.8**
1990–91	Philadelphia	50	50	33.9	.470	.000	.816	7.3	1.6	0.7	0.6	15.0
1991–92	Philadelphia	81	**81**	34.2	.511	.000	.807	8.1	1.5	0.6	1.0	16.9
1992–93	Philadelphia	80	26	21.8	.464	.000	**.843**	5.9	1.5	0.5	0.7	12.4
1993–94	New Jersey	**82***	5	24.0	.510	.000	.759	6.1	0.8	0.5	0.7	11.8
1994–95	New Jersey	**82***	30	30.1	.503	.000	.770	7.5	1.2	0.8	**1.1**	14.8
1995–96	New Jersey	78	76	36.6	.474	.000	.791	9.1	**1.8**	0.9	0.7	18.3
1996–97	Milwaukee	80	25	25.6	.471	.000	.768	6.2	0.7	0.8	0.5	8.6
1997–98	Milwaukee	**82***	25	25.8	.484	.000	.802	5.4	1.3	0.8	0.5	11.2
1998–99	Milwaukee	34	5	19.6	.453	.000	.782	3.7	0.6	0.6	0.4	8.3
1999–00	Utah	50	0	15.6	.436	.000	.779	4.2	0.8	0.2	0.3	6.7
Career		929	527	28.4	.489	.000	.776	6.9	1.2	0.7	0.7	13.7

=== Playoffs ===
Year	Team	GP	GS	MPG	FG%	3P%	FT%	RPG	APG	SPG	BPG	PPG
1988–89	Phoenix	9	0	14.0	**.529**	.000	.864	5.0	0.2	0.1	0.2	8.1
1990–91	Philadelphia	8	**8**	**35.9**	.462	.000	.848	**6.5**	**1.3**	0.6	0.8	**16.9**
1993–94	New Jersey	4	0	28.0	.441	.000	.750	6.3	0.3	0.5	**1.8**	10.5
1998–99	Milwaukee	3	0	11.7	.400	.000	**1.000**	1.7	0.3	**0.7**	0.3	5.7
1999–00	Utah	**10**	0	13.2	.326	.000	.385	2.9	0.4	0.4	0.4	3.5
Career		34	8	20.4	.444	.000	.784	4.6	0.5	0.4	0.6	8.9

== Coaching career ==
Gilliam began his coaching career in 2000 as a volunteer assistant at Mt. Lebanon High School. In 2001, Gilliam was named head coach of Penn State McKeesport's men's basketball team, which played at the junior college level. In his first year as a head coach, he helped lead the team to a regular season record of 12–7. The team played well in the playoffs and reached the conference finals. The next year Gilliam accepted the Head Men's coaching position at Penn State Altoona, where he coached from 2002 to 2005. He had a couple of unsuccessful seasons as their head coach.

== Awards and achievements ==
Among other awards Gilliam was inducted into the Bethel Park Hall of Fame for the Sport of Basketball in 1997 and the UNLV Hall of Fame in 1998. He was selected to the Division 1 All- American Team in 1987 and was a finalist for the John Wooden award the same year. He was honored in 1996 for scoring 10,000 points during his NBA career. In November 2007, his college jersey (#35) was retired at half-time of the UNLV vs. Washburn University game in Las Vegas.

== Name spelling ==
Towards the end of his NBA career he altered the spelling of his first name from "Armon" to "Armen" because he was tired of it continually being mispronounced. At the time, he was quoted as saying: "Most people pronounced it Ar-MON. I've been correcting people so long that I got tired of it. I just thought that if I put the 'e' in there, it would make it a lot easier to pronounce. I'm not Muslim. It's not religious or anything like that."

== Death ==
Gilliam collapsed during a basketball game at the LA Fitness gym in the Pittsburgh suburb of Bridgeville, Pennsylvania, on the evening of July 5, 2011. He was rushed to St. Clair Hospital in nearby Mt. Lebanon, where he was pronounced dead of a heart attack. He is survived by his three children, Jeremiah Gilliam, Joshua Gilliam, and Cheryl Gilliam.
