= Buffalo State Sports Arena =

Multi-purpose arena in Buffalo, New York

Coordinates: 42.934605°N 78.886471°W

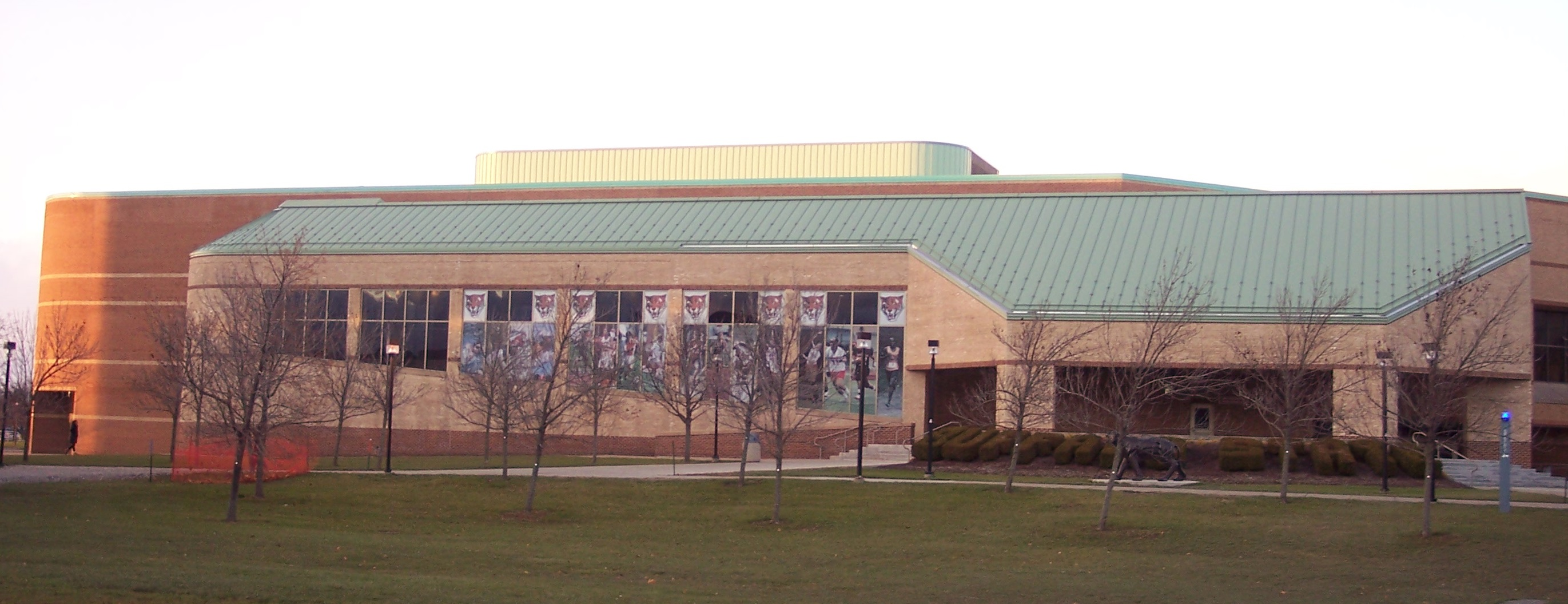
- Interactive map of Buffalo State Sports Arena
- Location: Buffalo State University; 1300 Elmwood Avenue; Buffalo, New York 14222
- Owner: Buffalo State University (SUNY)
- Operator: Buffalo State University (SUNY)
- Capacity: 3,500 (basketball); 1,800 (hockey)
- Surface: 200' x 85' (ice arena)

Construction
- Opened: 1991

Tenants
- Buffalo State Bengals (NCAA); Canisius men's ice hockey 1991–2014; ECC men's ice hockey 1991–2014; Buffalo Wings (MLRH/RHI) 1998–1999; Buffalo Silverbacks (ABA) 2006–2007

Buffalo State Sports Arena is a multi-purpose sports complex in Buffalo, New York, located at Buffalo State University. The building contains a sports arena, ice arena, Ruth Houston Gymnasium and Robert Kissinger Memorial Pool.

The sports arena seats 3,500, and is home to the Division III Buffalo State Bengals of the State University of New York Athletic Conference. It was formerly home to the Buffalo Silverbacks of the American Basketball Association. The venue has hosted major events including the 1993 NCAA Division III men's basketball tournament, 1993 World University Games, 1994 NCAA Division III men's basketball tournament and 1995 NCAA Division III men's basketball tournament.

The facility also houses the 1,800-seat Buffalo State Ice Arena that is home to the Buffalo State Bengals men's and women's ice hockey teams. It was formerly home to the Buffalo Wings, Canisius men's ice hockey and ECC men's ice hockey.
