= Tim Winn =

American former basketball player (born 1977)

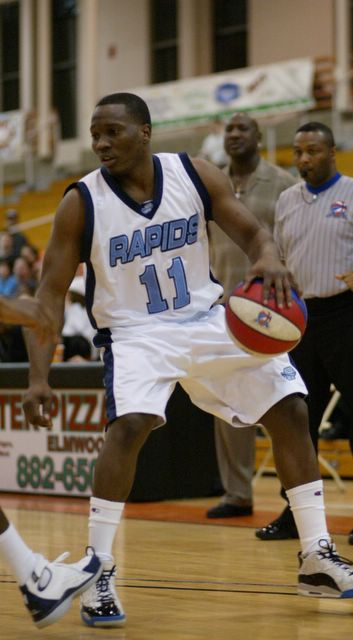
- Winn with the Buffalo Rapids in 2006

Personal information
- Born: June 27, 1977 (age 49)
- Listed height: 5 ft 9 in (1.75 m)
- Listed weight: 182 lb (83 kg)

Career information
- High school: La Salle (Niagara Falls, New York)
- College: St. Bonaventure (1996–2000)
- NBA draft: 2000: undrafted
- Playing career: 2000–2006
- Position: Point guard

Career history
- 2000–2001: Saskatchewan Hawks
- 2001–2004: Pennsylvania ValleyDawgs
- 2002: Marinos de Oriente
- 2003: Leicester Riders
- 2003–2004: Rockford Lightning
- 2004: Gary Steelheads
- 2004: GET Vosges
- 2005–2006: Buffalo Rapids

Career highlights
- Greater Buffalo Sports Hall of Fame (2022); St. Bonaventure Athletics Hall of Fame (2010); ABA All-Star (2006); All-ABA Second Team (2006); 2× USBL Champion (2001, 2004); USBL All-Defensive Team (2004); All-Atlantic 10 First Team (2000); 2× WNY Player of the Year (1995, 1996); 2× NYSPHSAA Class A Champion (1995, 1996)

Tim Winn (born June 27, 1977) is an American former basketball player. He played for the St. Bonaventure Bonnies from 1996 to 2000 and was named to the Atlantic 10 All-Conference first team in his senior year.

== High school career ==
Winn played for La Salle Senior High School in Niagara Falls. He was named Western New York Player of the Year in 1996. In 2009 as The Buffalo News celebrated 50 years of All-Western New York (WNY) basketball selections, Harris, who was thrice an All-WNY first team selection was a second team selection for the All-time All-WNY team.

== College career ==
Winn played for St. Bonaventure. In his freshman season, 1996–97, he ranked second on the team with 13.3 points per game. The following year, he averaged 12.2 points per game.

In 1998–99, Winn averaged 13.0 points and finished second in the nation with 3.5 steals per game. He was suspended for the first six games of the season when he was arrested for getting into a fight with another student. After pleading guilty to misdemeanor assault, he was sentenced to three years' probation.

In Winn's senior season, 1999–2000, he averaged 13.6 points per game and led the Bonnies in scoring. He also had 103 steals, which set a school record. He was named to the Atlantic 10 All-Conference and All-Defense first teams. Winn finished his college career with 1,407 points, 349 assists, and 319 steals.

== Professional career ==
After college, Winn played professional basketball in several leagues in the United States and overseas. In 2006, while playing for the Buffalo Rapids of the American Basketball Association, he averaged 25 points, 11 assists, and 4 steals and represented the Rapids in the ABA All Star Game.

== Personal life ==
Winn lives in Charlotte, North Carolina, with his wife, Tamaron and 2 sons Tim Jr and Rhasheen. He also has a daughter Timischa. He works at Bank of America.
