= Robert S. Desowitz =

Researcher of tropical medicine, parasites, and malaria

- Born: Robert S. Desowitz; January 2, 1926; New York
- Died: March 24, 2008 (aged 82); Pinehurst, North Carolina
- Occupations: researcher of tropical medicine, parasites, and malaria, and author
- Spouse: Carrolee Desowitz
- Children: 2

Robert S. Desowitz (January 2, 1926 – March 24, 2008) was a researcher of tropical medicine, parasites, and malaria, and an author.

== Life and career ==
Desowitz was born in New York, where he attended Niagara Falls High School. He served in the United States Army from 1944 to 1946. He received a bachelor's degree from the University at Buffalo in 1948. He earned a double doctorate in parasitology and medical biology from the University of London in 1951.

From 1951 to 1960, he worked for West African Institute for Trypanosomiasis Research in Vom, Nigeria. In 1960, he joined the University of Malaya in Singapore as Professor of Parasitology, where he worked until 1965. He then worked as Chief of the Southeast Asia Treaty Organization Laboratory's Department of Parasitology in Bangkok from 1965 to 1968. While working there, he spent time doing research in Papua New Guinea.

Desowitz worked from 1968 to 1995 as a professor in public health, tropical medicine, and microbiology at the John A. Burns School of Medicine at the University of Hawaiʻi at Mānoa. During his tenure there, he spent time researching malaria in Kenya.

Upon retirement as professor emeritus from the University of Hawaii, Desowitz worked as adjunct professor of epidemiology at the University of North Carolina's School of Public Health. He died March 24, 2008, in Pinehurst, North Carolina.

== Bibliography ==
- New Guinea Tape Worms and Jewish Grandmothers, 1987
- The Thorn in the Starfish, 1988
- The Malaria Capers, 1991
- Tropical Diseases: From 50, 000 BC to 2500 AD, 1997
- Who Gave Pinta to the Santa Maria: Torrid Diseases in a Temperate World, 1997
- Federal Body Snatchers and the New Guinea Virus: Tales of Parasites, People and Politics, 2004
