= Alexander Nwora =

American basketball coach

Erie Kats
- Title: Head coach
- League: NJCAA

Personal information
- Born: December 16, 1968 (age 57) Onitsha, Nigeria
- Listed height: 6 ft 4 in (1.93 m)

Career information
- College: Daemen (1989–1993)
- Playing career: 1989–1993
- Position: Small forward
- Number: 34

Career history

Coaching
- 1996–1999: Medaille College (assistant)
- 1999–present: ECC
- 2009–2013: Cape Verde
- 2017–2019: Nigeria

Career highlights
- As player: Daemen Athletics Hall of Fame (1993); As coach: 8× NJCAA Region III champion (2001, 2004, 2008, 2011, 2012, 2018, 2019, 2020); 6× NJCAA Coach of the Year (2001, 2008, 2010, 2018, 2019, 2020)

Alexander Nwora // is a Nigerian basketball coach of Erie Community College. He formerly coached the Cape Verde men's national basketball team and Nigeria men's national basketball team.

== Early life ==
Nwora was born in Onitsha, Nigeria.

He played at Daemen College under Richard Jacob and Don Silveri. Nwora later played for the International All-Stars, the touring opponents of the Harlem Globetrotters. He was inducted into the Daemen Athletics Hall of Fame in 1993.

== Coaching career ==
Nwora served as assistant coach under Richard Jacob at Medaille College, and replaced Reggie Witherspoon as Erie Community College head coach in 1999. He has captured eight NJCAA Region III championships while head coach of Erie Community College, and was named NJCAA Coach of the Year six times.

He was head coach of the Cape Verde men's national basketball team from 2009 to 2013, and led the team to AfroBasket 2013.

Nwora was head coach of the Nigeria men's national basketball team from 2017 to 2019, and led them to a silver medal at FIBA AfroBasket 2017.

== Personal life ==
He is married to Amy, a professor of occupational therapy. They have four children, with Jordan competing in the National Basketball Association.

During the 2019 FIBA Basketball World Cup qualifiers that took place in Lagos, Alexander and Jordan became the first Nigerian father and son to represent their national team at the same time.
