= 2005–06 ABA season =

- League: American Basketball Association
- Sport: Basketball
- Duration: November 2005 – March 2006

Regular season
- Season MVP: Chris Carrawell, Rochester Razorsharks

2006 ABA Playoffs
- champions: Rochester Razorsharks
- runners-up: San Jose Skyrockets
- champions: SoCal Legends
- runners-up: Strong Island Sound

2006 ABA Championship
- Champions: Rochester Razorsharks
- Runners-up: Strong Island Sound
- Finals MVP: Chris Carrawell, Rochester Razorsharks

ABA seasons
- ← 2004–05 2006–07 →

The 2005–06 ABA season was the fifth season of the American Basketball Association. The regular season began in November 2005 and concluded with the championship game in March against the Rochester Razorsharks and the Southern California Legends. The Razorsharks won the game, 117–114, to claim their first ABA title.

== Regular season standings ==
Red Conference
Ron Boone Division	W	L	Win %
San Jose Skyrockets	29	5	.853
Bellingham Slam	18	14	.563
Tacoma Navigators	10	6	.625
San Francisco Pilots	7	5	.583
Fresno Heatwave	2	20	.091
Bellevue Blackhawks	1	10	.091
Hawaii Mega Force	0	0	.000
Spencer Haywood Division	W	L	Win %
Southern California Legends	19	5	.792
Beijing Aoshen Olympian	19	13	.594
Gallup Talons	16	4	.800
Los Angeles Aftershock	11	15	.423
Tijuana Dragons	9	20	.310
Orange County Buzz	9	22	.290
New Mexico Style	1	10	.091
Inglewood Cobras	0	0	.000
White Conference
Freddie Lewis Division	W	L	Win %
Indiana Alley Cats	27	4	.871
Pittsburgh Xplosion	18	11	.621
Toledo Ice	16	13	.552
Detroit Wheels	6	17	.261
Cleveland Rockers (ABA)	5	6	.455
Ohio Aviators	3	13	.150
Blue Conference
Connie Hawkins Division	W	L	Win %
Maryland Nighthawks	25	11	.694
Rochester Razorsharks	24	4	.857
Buffalo Rapids	11	16	.407
Baltimore Pearls	2	23	.080
Barnes-Malone Division	W	L	Win %
Florida Pit Bulls	19	9	.679
Atlanta Vision	15	7	.682
Birmingham Magicians	6	13	.316
Charlotte Krunk	0	0	.000
Roger Brown Division	W	L	Win %
Harlem Strong Dogs	19	13	.594
Strong Island Sound	16	14	.533
Newark Express	14	16	.467
Montreal Matrix	14	16	.467
Boston Frenzy	2	20	.091

== Playoff Results ==
Quarterfinals
1	Rochester Razorsharks	126
9	Newark Express	98
7	Atlanta Vision	99
15	Buffalo Rapids	97
6	Pittsburgh Xplosion	115
10	Bellingham Slam	122
3	San Jose Skyrockets	132
18	Los Angeles Aftershock	90
2	Indiana Alley Cats	117
11	Toledo Ice	103
8	Harlem Strong Dogs	107
13	Strong Island Sound	112
5	Maryland Nighthawks	145
12	Montreal Matrix	114
4	SoCal Legends	97
14	Beijing Aoshen Olympian	95

Semifinals
1	Rochester Razorsharks	104
7	Atlanta Vision	85
10	Bellingham Slam	119
3	San Jose Skyrockets	138
2	Indiana Alley Cats	126
13	Strong Island Sound	128
5	Maryland Nighthawks	121
4	SoCal Legends	123

Finals
1	Rochester Razorsharks	106
3	San Jose Skyrockets	103
13	Strong Island Sound	110
4	SoCal Legends	123

ABA Championship
1	Rochester Razorsharks	117
4	SoCal Legends	114

=== Wild card round ===
- Rochester Razorsharks (1) received bye to Bracket One Quarterfinal
- Indiana Alley Cats (2) received bye to Bracket Two Quarterfinal
- San Jose Skyrockets (3) received bye to Bracket One Quarterfinal
- SoCal Legends (4) received bye to Bracket Two Quarterfinal
- Maryland Nighthawks (5) received bye to Bracket Two Quarterfinal
- Pittsburgh Xplosion (6) received bye to Bracket One Quarterfinal
- Atlanta Vision (7) received bye to Bracket One Quarterfinal
- Harlem Strong Dogs (8) received bye to Bracket Two Quarterfinal
- Newark Express (9) received bye to Bracket One Quarterfinal
- Bellingham Slam (10) defeated Tacoma Navigators (22) 134-116
- Toledo Ice (11) defeated Detroit Wheels (21) 132-130
- Montreal Matrix (12) defeated Ohio Aviators (23) 140-83
- Strong Island Sound (13) defeated Birmingham Magicians (19) 97-95
- Beijing Aoshen Olympian (14) defeated Fresno Heatwave (20) 134-82
- Buffalo Rapids (15) defeated Boston Frenzy (16) 133-88
- Los Angeles Aftershock (18) defeated Orange County Buzz (17) 91-86
