= Scott Layden =

American general manager (born 1959)

Philadelphia 76ers
- Position: Scout
- League: NBA

Personal information
- Born: 1959 (age 66–67) Brooklyn, New York, U.S.

Career information
- College: Saint Francis University
- Coaching career: 1981–1988

Career history

Coaching
- 1981–1982: Utah Jazz (talent scout)
- 1981–1992, 2005–2012: Utah Jazz (assistant)

Scott Layden (born 1959) is an American former general manager for the National Basketball Association (NBA). He currently serves as a scout for the Philadelphia 76ers of the NBA. He is the son of former coach and general manager of the Jazz, Frank Layden, and a graduate of Saint Francis University in Loretto, Pennsylvania, where he studied Business and Sports Management. Layden was the general manager for the Minnesota Timberwolves from 2016 to 2020.

== Early career ==
Layden played basketball for Niagara Catholic High School while his father was coaching at Niagara University. Layden also held various coaching jobs for the Jazz during the 1980s and '90s when his father was the head coach for the team. in 1981-82 he worked as a talent scout/assistant coach; he was promoted to assistant coach prior to the 1982 season, a position he held until 1988. It was during this time that he is generally considered responsible for the selection of a relatively unknown collegiate point guard out of Gonzaga University with the 16th pick in the 1984 NBA draft: John Stockton. The following year, he directed the draft again and selected Karl Malone with the 13th pick. Stockton and Malone helped the Jazz make the playoffs 18 consecutive seasons, including two Western Conference Titles in 1997 and 1998. From 1988 to 1990 Layden was the team's director of player personnel & assistant coach, a position he held shortly before he gave up his seat as assistant coach to focus solely on being the director of player personnel. In 1992, he was named director of basketball operations, where he stayed until his 1996 promotion to vice president of basketball operations. He left the organization in 1999 to replace interim general manager of the New York Knicks Ed Tapscott.

== Management career ==
=== New York Knicks ===
Layden was the New York Knicks executive vice president and general manager from 1999 to 2001, and the president and general manager of the organization from 2001 to 2003. The Knicks under Layden's watch (and that of his successor Isiah Thomas) were called the "Worst Franchise in Sports" by ESPN.com.

==== 1999–2000 ====
Layden took over as general manager of the Knicks after the strike-shortened, Cinderella-story season of 1998-99 that saw the team make history by becoming the first #8 seed in a conference to reach the NBA Finals. He replaced interim GM Ed Tapscott, who had already used the team's selection in the 1999 NBA draft to take injured Frenchman Frédéric Weis with the team's first-round pick, surprising many by passing over Ron Artest.

The new general manager of the Knicks made his first notable transaction when he signed controversial shooting guard Latrell Sprewell to a five-year, $61.9 million contract extension that would keep him in a Knick uniform through the 2003–04 season, although Sprewell would later be traded. Sprewell was a highly touted basketball talent, but he ran into off court issues with his former organization the Golden State Warriors when he assaulted head coach P. J. Carlesimo during a practice. Soon after becoming a member of the Knicks, Sprewell was involved in a car crash that saw him "drive his Mercedes-Benz on a freeway from an exit lane".

==== 2000–2001 ====
August 1, 2000, saw Layden make his second big move, when he re-signed free agent power forward Kurt Thomas to a 3-year, $13M contract extension, with a 1-year team option.

On September 20, the Knicks GM traded veteran, all-star, and team captain center Patrick Ewing to the Seattle SuperSonics in a four-team deal that saw back-up center Chris Dudley and the Knicks 2001 first-round draft pick go to the Phoenix Suns, in return for forwards Glen Rice & Lazaro Borrell, guard Vernon Maxwell, centers Luc Longley, Travis Knight, Vladimir Stepania, a 2001 first-round draft pick from the Los Angeles Lakers, a 2002 first-round draft pick from the Seattle SuperSonics, and two 2001 second-round draft picks. Rice played in 75 games, averaging 12 points-per-game for New York before being traded to Houston. Knight appeared in 126 games over three seasons, averaging less than 9 minutes per-game. Longley played in 25 games for the Knicks, averaging 2 points and 2.6 rebounds, while Borrell, Maxwell, & Stepania never saw action for the team. Ewing's production had decreased due to age and chronic injury over the past few seasons, and team brass felt that a deal was in the best interest of the future of the organization.

On January 30, 2001, guard Erick Strickland and a first and second-round draft pick from the Ewing trade were sent to the Vancouver Grizzlies for back-up forward/center Othella Harrington. Harrington would go to play in 237 games for New York, while starting in just 77. Vancouver would take Jamaal Tinsley with the 27th-pick in the draft acquired from New York.

February 22 saw guard Chris Childs and the other first-round draft pick sent to the Toronto Raptors in exchange for aging guards Mark Jackson and Muggsy Bogues. Bogues would never appear in a game for the Knicks, while Jackson would play less than two full seasons for the team that originally made him the 18th pick in the 1987 draft. Two months after the trade, Childs's new team, the Raptors, upset the Knicks in the playoffs, marking the first time in a decade that the Knicks failed to advance past the first round.

==== 2001–2002 ====
With the Knicks no longer having a first round draft pick in the 2001 NBA draft, Layden used the team's two second round picks on Michael Wright of Arizona (39th overall) and center Eric Chenowith of Kansas (43rd overall). Neither player ever saw action in the NBA.

On July 23, Knicks shooting guard Allan Houston re-signed as a free agent to a 6-year, $100M guaranteed contract that would keep him in New York until the 2006–07 season, when he would be 35. The signing made Houston, who had never averaged 20-points-per-game in a season at that time, the highest-paid player in franchise history. This transaction put the team "well over $80 million in payroll this season [2001]." Houston retired after the 2004–05 season with chronic knee complications; there was roughly $40,000,000 left on his contract.

Less than a month later, on August 10, Glen Rice was traded to the Houston Rockets and guard Muggsy Bogues to the Dallas Mavericks as part of a three-team deal in exchange for guard Howard Eisley from the Mavericks and forward Shandon Anderson from the Rockets. On paper this appeared to be a swap of average NBA players, but this was not the case. Eisley would end up playing in 154 games for Knicks, providing adequate numbers at the point guard position, but he was in the second year of a 7-year, $41 Million contract that he signed by Layden's former organization, the Utah Jazz. At the same time, Anderson, another former member of the Jazz, was in the first year of a 6-year, $42 Million contract that he signed with the Rockets, which extended through the 2006–07 season. Anderson played in 245 games for the Knicks over four seasons before being waived due to poor performance; he averaged less than 3 rebounds and 8 points-per-game during his stay. In comparison to the contracts New York gave up, Bogues was in the second year of a 4-year $8 Million contract with the fourth year being a team option, and Rice was under contract for three more years and $27 Million. The trade proved to be a bad one for the Knicks as it pushed team far beyond the salary cap limit, limiting their options for years to come.

Layden's next major move came after the unexpected resignation of head coach Jeff Van Gundy on December 8. Don Chaney was selected as an interim coach for the remainder of the 2001–02 season. After the team went 20-43 .317% under his command, he 《was given a contract extension for the following season.

==== 2002–2003 ====
The biggest move that Layden made during the 2002–03 season was completed on draft night. After selecting Nenê with the 7th pick in the 2002 NBA draft, Layden immediately traded the player, along with Marcus Camby and Mark Jackson, to the Denver Nuggets, in return for power forward Antonio McDyess, the draft rights to guard Frank Williams, and a 2003 second-round draft pick. McDyess, a former #2 draft pick, was already limited to role-player status due to chronic injury; he played only 18 games for the Knicks. Williams was a disappointment, as his Knick career lasted 65 games with only three starts. On the other end of this transaction, Denver received a solid NBA player in power forward/center Marcus Camby. Camby had averaged a double-double (at least 10 rebounds and 10 points per-game) over his previous two seasons as a Knick to go with nearly 2 blocked shots, along with being an integral part of New York's eastern conference title in 1999.

==== 2003–2004 ====
Layden's last season as the GM for the Knicks started off with the selections of Mike Sweetney from Georgetown with the 9th-overall pick in the draft, Maciej Lampe of Poland with the 30th pick, and Slavko Vraneš of Serbia and Montenegro with the 39th pick. Sweetney was later traded by Layden's successor Isiah Thomas as part of the deal with the Chicago Bulls that saw the Knicks acquire center Eddy Curry. Lampe never played in a game for New York as he was later traded to the Phoenix Suns, also by Thomas as part of the deal that saw Stephon Marbury come to the Knicks. Vraneš also never saw NBA action with New York, as he was waived by the team after being tendered a 1-year minimum contract; his NBA career totaled one game with the Portland Trail Blazers, in which he played three minutes and did not score.

On July 23, 2003, Layden traded guard Latrell Sprewell with two years remaining on his contract to the Minnesota Timberwolves as part of a four-team trade that also included interactions with the 76ers and Hawks. In return, the Knicks acquired veteran forward Keith Van Horn. Van Horn, an integral part of the New Jersey Nets 2002 eastern conference title, played in only 47 games for New York in just one season, averaging 16.4 points and 7.3 rebounds-per-game.

The last notable transaction that Layden made as general manager came on October 9, when he signed Dikembe Mutombo to a 2-year contract.

Scott Layden was fired on December 22, 2003, by New York Knicks owner James Dolan.

=== San Antonio Spurs ===
Layden served as assistant general manager for the San Antonio Spurs from 2012 to 2016.

=== Minnesota Timberwolves ===
On April 20, 2016, Layden was appointed as the general manager of the Minnesota Timberwolves. He served in an advisory role to president of basketball operations Tom Thibodeau, and continued in the same role when Thibodeau was replaced by Gersson Rosas. On December 9, 2020, Layden and the Timberwolves mutually parted ways after four seasons in the position.

=== Sacramento Kings ===
On September 26, 2022, Layden was hired to serve as a scout for the Sacramento Kings. On June 7, 2025, Layden and the Kings organization parted ways.

=== Philadelphia 76ers ===
On October 14, 2025, the Philadelphia 76ers hired Layden as a scout.

== Personal life ==
Layden is the son of longtime Utah Jazz head coach Frank Layden.

Layden and his wife, Marsha, have four daughters, three of whom are afflicted with an extremely rare congenital connective tissue disorder.
