= Los Angeles Aftershock =

- League: ABA
- Founded: 2004
- Folded: 2006
- History: Los Angeles Stars (2004–2005); Los Angeles Aftershock (2005–2006)
- Arena: Los Angeles Southwest College
- Location: Los Angeles, California
- Team colors: Black, white, and blue
- Head coach: Andre Smith
- Ownership: Shawn Blattenberger
- Championships: 0

The Los Angeles Aftershock were a team in the American Basketball Association. The team took over for the Los Angeles Stars, whose only season was in 2004–2005. The Aftershock folded after the 2005–2006 season.

== 2004–2005 season ==
Los Angeles Stars folded after their owner's rent checks bounced.

== 2005-2006 season ==
The Aftershock had an 11-15 regular season record and made it to the playoffs, but lost in the second round to the San Jose Skyrockets.

=== Summer Pro League 2005 ===
They scheduled six games in the Southern California Summer Pro League ("SPL") which has been around for 35 years and is composed NBA teams and current NBA stars as well as other local talent and international teams.

- July 10, 100-98 win over PSL Panthers
- July 12, 100-102 loss to Unity
- July 16, 106-94 win over the NBA Pros
- July 16, 89-125 loss to Play 2 Win
- July 17, 95-105 loss to Pro Sports Now
- July 19, 92-98 loss to P. Miller

=== SPL 2005 Record ===
- 2-4 .333

=== Roster ===
- 3 Charles Litt Guard 6' 0" Benedictine University
- 4 Jason Braxton Guard 6' 2" Arizona State University
- 5 Chioke Conner Forward 6' 5" Shelby State
- 6 Jamar Cramer Guard 6' 3" L.A. Trade
- 8 Thomas Blunt Center 6' 7" Concordia of St. Paul
- 10 Will Burr Guard 6' 3" Clark College Atlanta
- 13 Rambo Rasheed Guard 6' 0" South Dakota State
- 20 Terrence Martin Guard 6'4 Arkansas Tech
- 21 Dion Bailey Guard 6' 4" Utah State
- 22 Ron Strange Forward 6' 8" Cal Poly Pomona
- 23 Chad Brown Guard 6' 4" Wyoming/Cal State Hayward
- 32 Derek Jones Forward 6' 6" UC Santa Cruz
- 33 Matthew Houser Forward 6' 8" Chico State
- 34 Tyler Murphy Guard/Forward 6' 7" USC
- 44 Corey Williams Forward 6' 7" Paine State
- 55 Jeff Dailey Center 7'1" Southern Utah

=== Schedule ===
- November 5 vs. O.C. Buzz Lost [107-110]
- November 11 vs. SoCal Legends Won [128-114]
- November 12 vs. O.C. Buzz Lost [109-111]
- November 13 vs. Tijuana Dragons Won [141-102]
- November 18 vs. Bellingham Slam Won [119-114]
- November 19 vs. Bellingham Slam Won [117-113
- December 2 @ San Francisco Pilots Lost [89-92]
- December 3 @ Las Vegas Rattlers Won [122-119]
- December 8 @ Tijuana Dragons Won [127-103]
- December 11 vs. San Jose Skyrockets Lost [118-121]
- December 13 @ SoCal Legends Lost [94-107]
- January 5 @ Beijing Olympians Lost [76-85]
- January 10 @ Gallup Talons Lost [112-115]
- January 11 @ Gallup Talons Lost [104-112]
- January 14 @ Beijing Olympians Won [87-80]
- January 19 @ Tijuana Dragons Lost [90-104]
- January 21 @ Fresno Heatwave Lost [107-110]
- January 22 @ Fresno Heatwave Won [103-101]
- January 25 @ SoCal Legends Lost [104-119]
- January 28 vs. O.C. Buzz Won [125-107]
- January 29 @ O.C. Buzz Lost [90-115]
- February 4 @ O.C. Buzz Won [114-100]
- February 14 @ Bellingham Slam Lost [80-128]
- February 16 @ Bellingham Slam Lost [100-107]
- February 17 @ Bellevue Blackhawks Won [125-91]
- February 25 vs. Gallup Talons Cancelled 7:30 p.m.
- February 26 vs. Gallup Talons Cancelled 5:30 p.m.
- March 4 vs. Beijing Olympians Lost [-]
- March 12 vs. Beijing Olympians 1st Round Playoffs Won [91-86]
- March 18 @ San Jose Skyrockets 2nd Round Playoffs Lost [132-90]
