= Lawrence Moten =

American basketball player (1972–2025)

Personal information
- Born: March 25, 1972 Washington, D.C., U.S.
- Died: September 30, 2025 (aged 53) Washington, D.C., U.S.
- Listed height: 6 ft 5 in (1.96 m)
- Listed weight: 185 lb (84 kg)

Career information
- High school: Archbishop Carroll (Washington, D.C.); New Hampton School (New Hampton, New Hampshire)
- College: Syracuse (1991–1995)
- NBA draft: 1995: 2nd round, 36th overall pick
- Drafted by: Vancouver Grizzlies
- Playing career: 1995–2006
- Position: Shooting guard
- Number: 7, 21, 3

Career history
- 1995–1997: Vancouver Grizzlies
- 1997: Papagou
- 1997–1998: La Crosse Bobcats
- 1998: Washington Wizards
- 1998–1999: Idaho Stampede
- 2001: Maryland Mustangs
- 2001–2002: Saskatchewan Hawks
- 2002: Mobile Revelers
- 2004–2006: Maryland Nighthawks

Career highlights
- 2× ABA All-Star (2005, 2006); Third-team All-American – AP, NABC (1995); 3× First-team All-Big East (1993–1995); Third-team All-Big East (1992); No. 21 retired by Syracuse Orange

Career NBA statistics
- Points: 747 (6.3 ppg)
- Rebounds: 181 (1.5 rpg)
- Assists: 182 (1.5 apg)
- Stats at NBA.com
- Stats at Basketball Reference

Lawrence Edward Moten III (March 25, 1972 – September 30, 2025) was an American professional basketball player. He played three seasons in the National Basketball Association (NBA) for the Vancouver Grizzlies and Washington Wizards. He was an All-American as a college basketball player for the Syracuse Orange, leaving as the program's all-time leading scorer.

== Biography ==
Moten attended Archbishop Carroll High School in Washington, D.C., and the New Hampton School in New Hampton, New Hampshire before playing his college ball at Syracuse University. Playing as a guard/forward, he is the career scoring leader for that school with 2,334 points and graduated as the Big East Conference's all-time leading scorer with 1,405 points, ahead of Troy Bell (Boston College, 1,388 points), Terry Dehere (Seton Hall, 1,320 points), and Chris Mullin (St. John's, 1,290 points). Moten averaged 19.3 ppg, 4.9 rpg and 2.4 apg over his four-year collegiate career—scoring in double figures in 118 of 121 games. He is the only player to score 500 or more points in four consecutive seasons in Syracuse history and was the first player since Hall of Famer Dave Bing to lead Syracuse in scoring for three straight seasons.

He was selected by the Vancouver Grizzlies in the 2nd round (36th overall pick) of the 1995 NBA draft. He played for the Grizzlies for two seasons from 1995 to 1997 and for the Washington Wizards during the 1997–98 season. After his NBA career, he played in the CBA and ABA, and in Spain and Venezuela.

Moten later became the vice president of player development for the Maryland Nighthawks of the ABA. He was the head coach of the Rochester Razorsharks in 2014 and led them to their fourth PBL title.

After his basketball career ended, Moten worked with middle school youth in central New York. He had two daughters with his wife Noelene.

Moten died in Washington, D.C. on September 30, 2025, aged 53.

== Career statistics ==
Legend
GP	Games played	GS	Games started	MPG	Minutes per game
FG%	Field goal percentage	3P%	3-point field goal percentage	FT%	Free throw percentage
RPG	Rebounds per game	APG	Assists per game	SPG	Steals per game
BPG	Blocks per game	PPG	Points per game	**Bold**	Career high

=== NBA ===
==== Regular season ====
Year	Team	GP	GS	MPG	FG%	3P%	FT%	RPG	APG	SPG	BPG	PPG
1995–96	Vancouver	44	3	13.0	**.453**	**.327**	.653	1.4	1.1	**.7**	.2	6.6
1996–97	Vancouver	**67**	**18**	**18.1**	.388	.291	.646	**1.8**	**1.9**	**.7**	**.4**	**6.7**
1997–98	Washington	8	0	3.4	.231	.000	**.750**	.1	.4	.0	.0	1.1
Career		119	21	15.2	.408	.299	.652	1.5	1.5	.6	.3	6.3
