= Kenny Brunner =

American professional basketball coach and former player

Personal information
- Born: December 8, 1978 (age 47) Los Angeles, California, U.S.
- Listed height: 5 ft 11 in (1.80 m)
- Listed weight: 185 lb (84 kg)

Career information
- High school: Dominguez (Compton, California)
- College: Georgetown (1997–1998); Southern Idaho (1999–2000)
- NBA draft: 2002: undrafted
- Playing career: 2000–2009
- Position: Point guard
- Coaching career: 2012–present

Career history

Playing
- 2000–2001: San Diego Wildfire
- 2000: Euro Nokia Roseto
- 2003–2004: Ca'eros Gilded Navolato
- 2004: Fastlink
- 2004–2005: Ca'eros de Navolato
- 2005–2006: SoCal Legends
- 2006: BG Karlsruhe
- 2007: Maywood Buzz
- 2007: Buffalo Silverbacks
- 2008–2009: Sacramento Heatwave

Coaching
- 2014–2017: Western Port Steelers

Career highlights
- ABA All Star-Game (2006); Third-team Parade All-American (1997)

Kenneth Dwayne Brunner II (born December 8, 1978) is an American professional basketball coach and former player. Brunner played college basketball for the Georgetown Hoyas and the Southern Idaho Golden Eagles.

== Early life ==
Bruner was born on December 8, 1978, in Los Angeles California. His father was an alcoholic and his mother was a drug addict so Bruner was raised primarily by his grandmother in Inglewood, California. He first played football but transitioned to basketball at the encouragement of his grandmother. To further develop his potential, Brunner was encouraged to attend Dominguez High School in Compton, California – an hour-long bus ride away from his home but where he created a reputation by playing streetball.

Bruner was considered the nation's top point guard during his senior season. He committed to play college basketball for the Fresno State Bulldogs but rescinded his offer when the Bulldogs received point shaving allegations in March 1997.

== College career ==
Brunner began his college career at Georgetown University during the 1997–98 season. He started all 19 games he played for the Hoyas and averaged 11.2 points, 3.2 rebounds and 7.3 assists; his assist count would have ranked seventh nationally if had played in enough games to qualify. He still holds the Hoyas' career assist average record. In early February 1998, Brunner was held out of the line-up for "personal reasons". On February 8, 1998, Brunner met with Hoyas head coach John Thompson and quit the team.

Brunner flew to Fresno State University and enrolled on the last day of registration for the spring semester. Five weeks after his registration, he was sitting out the semester as a transfer when he and teammate Avondre Jones were indefinitely suspended from the team for the robbery and assault of a Fresno State student with the use of a samurai sword. Brunner denied he was involved; a judge dismissed the charges as an escalation of "horsing around".

On May 24, 1998, Brunner was arrested on suspicion of armed robbery when he allegedly held up Los Angeles City College basketball coach Mike Miller at gunpoint inside the school's gymnasium. Brunner was held in the LA County Jail for four months until the charges were dropped two days before the trial. He enrolled at Santa Monica Junior College but left without playing a game.

Brunner transferred to play for the Southern Idaho Golden Eagles for the 1999–2000 season, where he averaged 14.2 points a game. He signed a letter of intent to play for the Georgia Bulldogs under coach Jim Harrick, but his scholarship offer was overruled by the school's president when his official academic transcripts were not submitted by the deadline. Brunner instead enrolled at Salem International University for the 2000–01 season but did not play and left to pursue a professional career.

== Professional career ==
Brunner began his professional career with the San Diego Wildfire of the American Basketball Association and averaged 15.3 points, 3.6 rebounds and 6.0 assists per game. He broke his leg and injured his knee which led to him playing exhibition basketball while he recovered. Brunner toured with the AND1 Live Tour across Europe and Asia in 2003 and 2004 as he earned the nicknames "Bad Santa" and "The Bad One".

Brunner played professionally in Europe, Mexico and Australia. His final stint was in Australia in 2009 when he tore a ligament in his bone and forced his retirement.

== Coaching career ==
Brunner served as the Director of Coaching for the Western Port Steelers from 2011 to 2013. He left the team due to family reasons in 2013 but returned as head coach on a three-year deal in 2014.

Brunner has run coaching clinics for children in Melbourne, Victoria and in Fitzroy Crossing in the Kimberley region of Western Australia.

== Personal life ==
Brunner has four sons.

== Awards and achievements ==
- 2009 Las Vegas PRO-AM Champions (Spice1)
- 2008 Eurobasket Summer League Champions (Sevilla)
- 2007 Southern California NBA Summer Pro League Champions and All-League Selection (Play2Win Delta Jammers)
- 2006 Southern California NBA Summer Pro League Champions and All-League Selection (Delta Jammers-Play2Win)
- 2006 ABA Western Conference All-Star Team (SoCal Legends)
- 2005 Southern California NBA Summer Pro League Champions – MVP (Play2Win-Delta Jammers)
- 2005 Mexican CIBACOPA All-Star game (Cañeros de Navolato)
- 2004 NBA Southern California SPL All-Star team
- 2002 Drafted by NBDL Asheville Altitude (14th round 3rd pick)
- 2000 NJCAA National Tournament
- 2000 Region XVIII tournament finalists (Southern Idaho)
- 2000 Second Team Scenic West Conference All-Region (Southern Idaho)
