= Trevor Ruffin =

American basketball player (born 1970)

Personal information
- Born: September 26, 1970 (age 56) Buffalo, New York, U.S.
- Listed height: 6 ft 1 in (1.85 m)
- Listed weight: 185 lb (84 kg)

Career information
- High school: Bennett (Buffalo, New York)
- College: Cuyahoga CC (1989–1990); Arizona Western (1991–1992); Hawaii (1992–1994)
- NBA draft: 1994: undrafted
- Playing career: 1994–2005
- Position: Point guard
- Number: 8

Career history
- 1994–1995: Phoenix Suns
- 1995: PAOK
- 1995–1996: Philadelphia 76ers
- 1996–1997: Florida Beachdogs
- 2005: Buffalo Rapids

Career highlights
- First-team All-WAC (1994); WAC tournament MVP (1994)
- Stats at NBA.com
- Stats at Basketball Reference

Trevor Ruffin (born September 26, 1970) is an American former professional basketball player who played briefly in the National Basketball Association (NBA).

The 6-foot-1-inch (1.85 m) point guard played at the University of Hawaiʻi from 1992 to 1994. While leading the Rainbow Warriors to a 1994 NCAA tournament appearance, Ruffin set the school's single-game individual scoring record with 42 points against the University of Louisville.

He entered the NBA undrafted in 1994 and played for the Phoenix Suns during the 1994–95 NBA season. In 1995, Ruffin moved to Greece to play for PAOK Thessaloniki. During the 1995–96 FIBA European Cup, he appeared in five games for PAOK, averaging 18.2 points, 3.6 assists and 2.6 rebounds per game. He subsequently returned to the NBA, playing for the Philadelphia 76ers during the 1995–96 NBA season.

Ruffin started 24 of his 110 career NBA regular-season games. During his rookie season with Phoenix in 1994–95, he averaged 4.8 points in 6.5 minutes per game while playing behind Elliot Perry and Kevin Johnson. In the 1995–96 season with Philadelphia, he averaged 12.8 points and 4.4 assists in 61 games.

Ruffin later played for the Florida Beachdogs. He was waived by the ABA's Buffalo Rapids/Silverbacks during the 2005–06 season due to injury but returned as interim head coach in November 2006 following the resignation of Richard Jacob. He was subsequently succeeded by Marc Fulcher.
