= Pittsburgh Xplosion =

- Leagues: ABA 2004–2006; CBA 2006–2008
- Founded: 2004
- Folded: 2008
- History: Pittsburgh Hardhats (ABA) 2004 (never played) Pennsylvania Pit Bulls (ABA) 2004–2005; Pittsburgh Xplosion 2005–2008
- Arena: Pittsburgh Civic Arena; Petersen Events Center
- Location: Pittsburgh, Pennsylvania
- Team colors: black, gold, orange
- Head coach: Carlos Knox
- Ownership: Freddie Lewis; Richard Hersperger
- Championships: 0
Home	Away

The Pittsburgh Xplosion was a professional basketball team based in Pittsburgh, Pennsylvania. Pittsburgh were members of the Continental Basketball Association (CBA) from 2006 to 2008. Founded in 2004 as the Pittsburgh Hard Hats as a member of the American Basketball Association (2000–present) (ABA), the team, following an ownership change, took the court as the Pennsylvania Pit Bulls. The team became the Xplosion in 2005, and joined the CBA in 2006. It has been replaced in the ABA with the modern day Pittsburgh Phantoms and later the Pittsburgh Bassets. The Xplosion played at Pittsburgh Civic Arena and on the campus of the University of Pittsburgh at the Petersen Events Center, both in Pittsburgh, Pennsylvania.

== Season by season ==
Note: W = wins, L = losses, % = win–loss %

Season	W	L	%	Playoffs	Results
Pennsylvania Pit Bulls (ABA)
2004-05	8	9	.471		
Pittsburgh Xplosion (ABA)
2005-06	18	11	.621	Lost Quarterfinals	Bellingham 122, Pittsburgh 115
Pittsburgh Xplosion (CBA)
2006-07	10	38	.208	Won Quarterfinals; Lost Semifinals	Pittsburgh 119, Indiana 103; Minot 2, Pittsburgh 0
2007-08	29	19	.604	Won Quarterfinals; Lost Semifinals	Pittsburgh 129, East Kentucky 121; Minot 2, Pittsburgh 0

== History ==
=== Pittsburgh Hardhats ===
The Pittsburgh Hardhats were an American Basketball Association team based in Pittsburgh, Pennsylvania. The team was created by Joseph Dydek after he failed to start an NBA team in Pittsburgh. To his surprise, the "Hardhats" were not very financially stable. The team essentially existed on paper only, as it folded prior to the start of the season due to financial difficulties. The team was replaced October 12, 2004, by the Pennsylvania Pit Bulls, who competed in the 2004-2005 ABA season.

=== Pennsylvania Pit Bulls/Xplosion ===
After the dissolution of the Hardhats, the Pennsylvania Pit Bulls were admitted to the ABA on October 12, 2004, to play in the 2004-2005 ABA season. They finished with an eight win-nine loss record, good for 7th place in the Blue Division, but not good enough to advance to postseason play. The team's first game (19 November 2004) was marred by the myocardial infarction-induced death of coach Tom Washington, who collapsed on court in the fourth quarter. The game was suspended; assistant coach Pat Blue was tabbed to be the team's head coach for the remainder of the season.

The Pit Bulls played a majority of their home games at Penn State Greater Allegheny, but later moved to McKeesport High School.

For the 2005–2006 season, the Pit Bulls became the Pittsburgh Xplosion. The team finished league competition with an 18 win-11 loss record, good for second place in the Freddie Lewis Division of the ABA White Conference. The Xplosion were eliminated in the playoffs by the Bellingham Slam. The team subsequently left the ABA and entered the Continental Basketball Association, in which it continued to play as the Xplosion through the 2007–08 season.

Former Pitt stars, Antonio Graves, John DeGroat, and Carl Krauser started on the 2008 season roster.

In the 2008 American Conference Finals, the Xplosion lost to the Minot SkyRockets. The SkyRockets won the first two out of three games in Minot, but ceased operations after the 2008 campaign. The Xplosion lasted a little longer, folding just prior to the start of the 2008–09 season, citing the economy.

== See also ==
- Pittsburgh Phantoms
