= Niagara Falls High School =

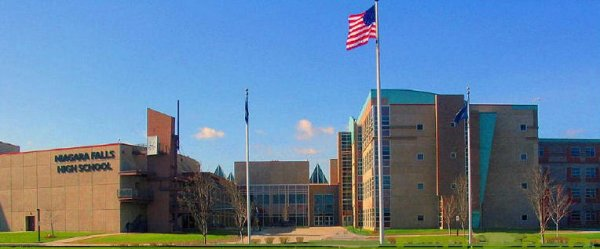

Location
- 4455 Porter Road; Niagara Falls, New York 14301; United States
- Coordinates: 43.104577°N 79.010686°W

Information
- Type: Public high school
- Established: September 1, 2000
- School district: Niagara Falls City School District
- Superintendent: Mark Laurrie
- CEEB code: 334170
- Chief Educational Administrator: Cynthia Jones
- Teaching staff: 136.23 (FTE)
- Grades: 9–12
- Enrollment: 2,142 (2023–2024)
- Student to teacher ratio: 15.72
- Campus type: Urban
- Colors: Blue and gold
- Nickname: Wolverines
- Newspaper: The Chronicle
- Website: Niagara Falls High School

Niagara Falls High School is a public high school located at 4455 Porter Road in Niagara Falls, New York, United States. It was established and dedicated on September 1, 2000 and opened on September 6, 2000, becoming the city's only public high school, with the merging of the original Niagara Falls High School and the former LaSalle Senior High School. The school's graduation rate is 71%, slightly below the state average.

== Niagara Falls City School District ==
Niagara Falls High School is operated under the supervision of the Niagara Falls City School District. It is the only high school in the district since the merger of the original Niagara Falls High School and LaSalle Senior High School. The high school is fed by two preparatory schools, Gaskill Prep and LaSalle Prep, which host grades 7 and 8.

== Notable alumni ==
- Jermaine Crumpton - Professional basketball player
- Marcus Feagin - Professional basketball player
- Jonny Flynn - Former professional basketball player
- Paul Harris - Former professional basketball player
- Sal Maglie - Professional baseball player
- Rick Manning - Professional baseball player
- Jeff Parmer - professional basketball player
- Jane Bryant Quinn - Financial journalist
- James Starks - Former Green Bay Packers running back
- Tommy Tedesco - Guitarist and studio musician
