= Penn State Greater Allegheny =

Public college in McKeesport, Pennsylvania, U.S.

Coordinates: 40.345244°N 79.825941°W

- Type: Public satellite campus
- Established: 1948
- Parent institution: Pennsylvania State University
- Affiliations: PSUAC (USCAA)
- Chancellor: Megan L. Nagel, Ph.D.
- President: Neeli Bendapudi
- Administrative staff: 151
- Students: 308 (Fall 2025)
- Undergraduates: 308 (Fall 2025)
- Location: McKeesport, Pennsylvania, U.S.
- Campus: 52 acres (210,000 m^{2})
- Colors: Beaver Blue and White
- Nickname: PSGA
- Mascot: Nittany Lion

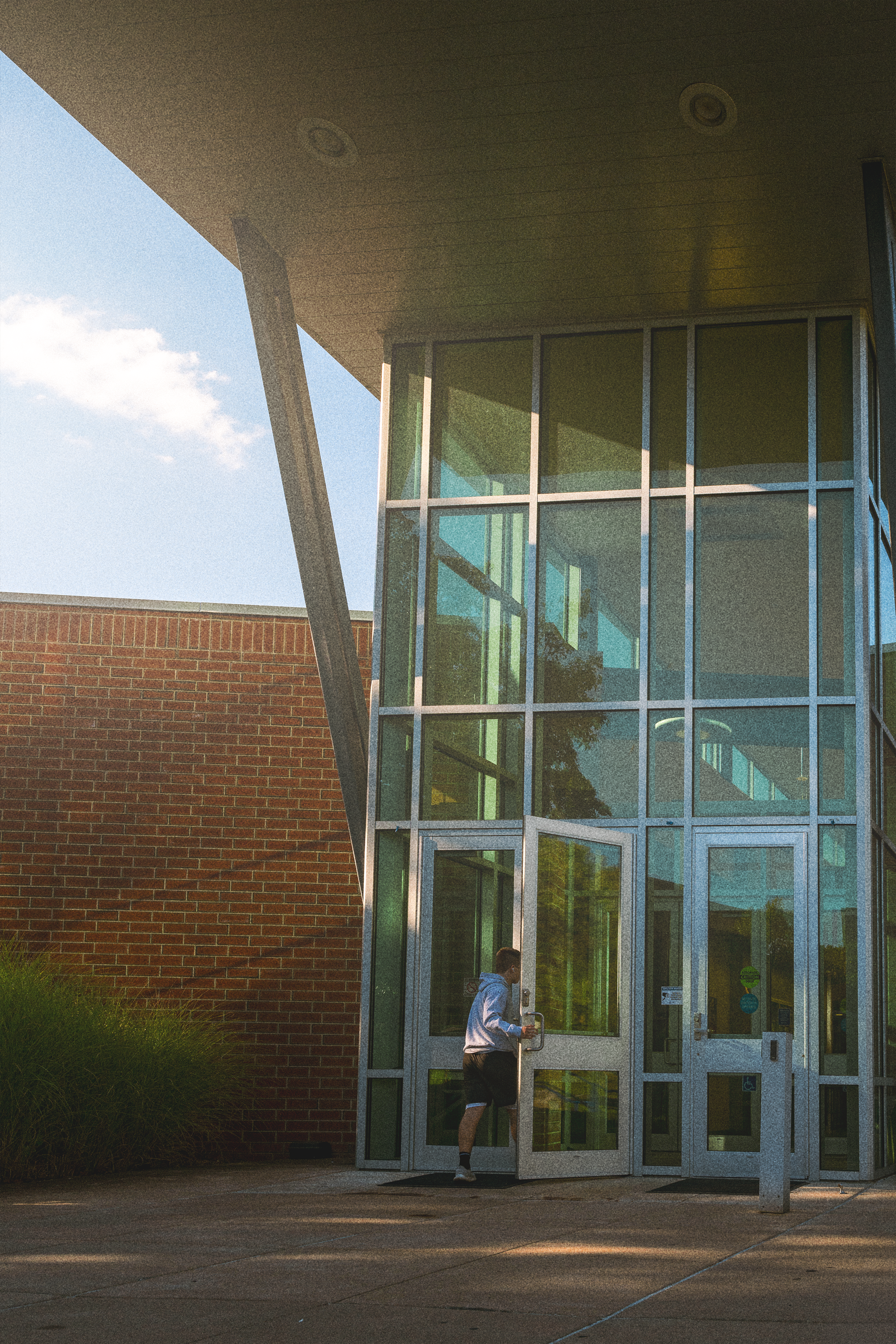
A student is photographed walking into the Student Community Center at Penn State Greater Allegheny. Photographed by J. Ryan Simon, October 2025.

Penn State Greater Allegheny (PSGA) is a commonwealth campus of the Pennsylvania State University that sits on the border of McKeesport and White Oak in Pennsylvania.

== History ==
As early as 1934, the Pennsylvania State College offered technical courses in the Pittsburgh and McKeesport region. In 1948, the Penn State McKeesport Center opened in Dravosburg, providing occupational training and self-enrichment courses for returning veterans. The center moved to McKeesport in 1952 and established associate degree programs, with the first graduates completing their studies in 1955.

In 1955, a group of area businessmen formed the Penn State McKeesport Advisory Board to identify a permanent location for the center. In 1957, the current campus site in White Oak was established and the Main Building was constructed. Since that time, the campus has continued to serve the Greater Pittsburgh region through its academic programs.

Originally known as Penn State McKeesport, the Penn State Board of Trustees initially voted to rename the campus to Penn State Greater Allegheny during its September 2006 meeting. The board subsequently approved the current name in January 2007.

== Academics ==
Undergraduate demographics as of Fall 2023
Race and ethnicity	Total
White	59%
Black	19%
Asian	7%
Two or more races	6%
Hispanic	4%
International student	3%
American Indian/Alaska Native	1%
Unknown	1%
Economic diversity
Low-income (Note: The percentage of students who received an income-based federal Pell grant intended for low-income students.)	45%
Affluent (Note: The percentage of students who are a part of the American middle class at the bare minimum.)	55%

Penn State Greater Allegheny offers a range of associate and baccalaureate degree programs that allow students to begin their academic studies on campus and, when applicable, continue their education through the Penn State system. Academic offerings span multiple disciplines including business, information technology, healthcare, human services, social sciences, and interdisciplinary studies.

The campus is also home to the only accredited Bachelor of Social Work (BSW) program in the Penn State system.

The campus has expanded its associate degree offerings in healthcare technology fields to include Radiological Sciences and Biomedical Engineering Technology.

=== 2+2 Plan ===
Nearly all of Penn State's 275+ baccalaureate degree programs can be started at Penn State Greater Allegheny. Students may complete their first two years at Greater Allegheny before transitioning to a different Penn State campus to complete their studies. Approximately 60% of all Penn State students enter the university through the 2+2 plan.

== Honors program ==
Penn State Greater Allegheny offers an honors program which has many benefits such as early class registration, special library privileges, small class sizes and advanced research projects. Students that are a part of this program may earn honors credits by taking honors courses, participating in honors options or pursuing independent studies.

Admission to the honors program is by invitation and based on quality of academic performance as well as experiences outside of the classroom. Eligible incoming first year students will receive a letter of invitation during the admission process. For current students, the invitation is made by the Honors Committee at the end of each academic year.

Each honors student must meet the set requirements each year to remain a part of the program. Generally, a student must maintain a 3.33 GPA, complete at least one honors course each semester and participate in activities sponsored by the honors program.

== Campus ==
- Main Building (1957) Main Building was the first permanent structure on the current campus following the relocation to border of McKeesport and White Oak. It originally housed administrative offices. It now houses the Penn State Extension Allegheny County office, as well as classrooms and academic space for education, English, communications, psychology, and other liberal arts disciplines, along with continuing education offices and multimedia-equipped classrooms.
- E. R. Crawford Building (1959) The Crawford Building serves as the campus technology and instructional hub. It contains computer labs, the technology help desk, the digital commons, and multimedia-equipped classrooms. It also houses the campus esports lab and supports instructional space for information technology and related academic programs.
- Frable Building (1969) Named for Milton Frable, the first campus advisory board president, the Frable Building houses administrative offices including the chancellor’s office, academic affairs, admissions, and campus police services. It also contains academic departments including business, engineering, information sciences and technology, and mathematics, along with classrooms and conference space.
- Wunderley Gymnasium (1971) Named in honor of John M. Wunderley, the Wunderley Gymnasium contains athletic facilities as well as classrooms and faculty offices. The building is located on a hillside overlooking the center of campus.
- J. Clarence Kelly Library (1972) The Kelly Library houses library services and student academic support resources, including the John H. Gruskin Student Success Center and The ACE Program (TRIO Student Support Services). It also provides computer access for student use.
- Ostermayer Laboratory (1972; renovated 2021) Ostermayer Laboratory houses the biology and chemistry departments and includes laboratory classrooms and instructional space for science courses and related disciplines. The building was renovated in 2021 to modernize instructional and collaborative spaces.
- Buck Union Building (1961–2002) The Buck Union Building, commonly referred to as the BUB, served as a central student activities facility on campus until its demolition in 2002 to make way for the Student Community Center.
- Student Community Center (2003) The Student Community Center (SCC) serves as the central hub for student life on campus. It contains dining services, the campus bookstore, student organization space, a game room, campus radio station facilities, and multipurpose space for campus programming, events, performances, guest speakers, and student activities.
- Nittany Lion Shrine (1968 replica installation; dedicated 2003) The campus is home to one of the original quarter-scale Nittany Lion Shrine replicas installed at Penn State campuses across the Commonwealth. The shrine was installed on campus in 2003 and is located near the Student Community Center. It serves as a landmark and photo location for students and visitors.
- Mon Valley LaunchBox (2019) The Mon Valley LaunchBox is an entrepreneurship and innovation hub affiliated with Invent Penn State, Penn State Greater Allegheny, and located in the City of McKeesport. It supports regional entrepreneurship, innovation programming, and community engagement initiatives.

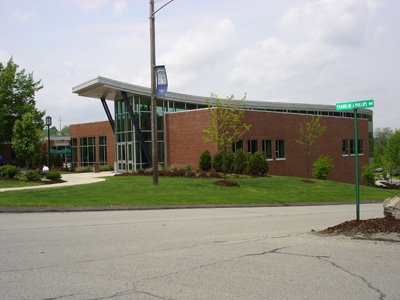
The Student Community Center, which opened in 2003.

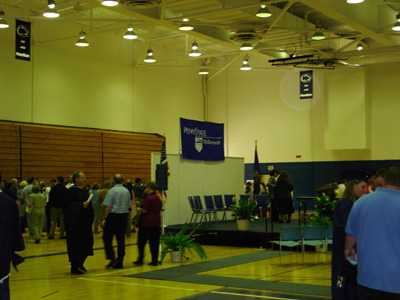
The Wunderley Gymnasium during the 2005 graduation ceremony.

=== McKeesport Hall—Residential On-Campus Housing ===
Penn State Greater Allegheny is a residential campus. McKeesport Hall is located on a hillside overlooking the main campus area and provides housing for approximately 200 students.

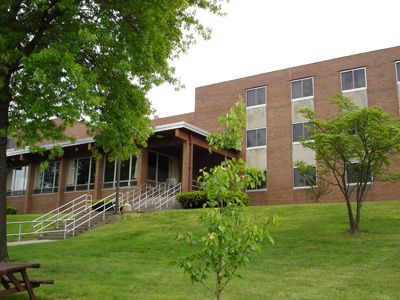
McKeesport Hall, Constructed in 1969.

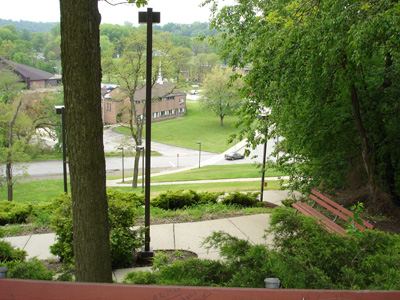
The hill leading from McKeesport hall to central campus.

== Athletics ==
=== Varsity sports ===
Penn State Greater Allegheny offers many different varsity sports including baseball, men's and women's basketball, men's and women's soccer, and women's volleyball.

=== Fitness facilities ===
A new fitness center was constructed at Penn State Greater Allegheny in the spring of 2005. The fitness center is located next to McKeesport Hall and contains a variety of fitness equipment. Some of the equipment includes: treadmills, exercise bikes, ellipticals, free weights and weight machines.
