= Washington GreenHawks =

Team of the Atlantic Coast Professional Basketball League

- Founded: 2004
- Folded: 2011
- League: ABA (2004–2007); PBL (2007–2010); ACPBL (2010–2011)
- Team history: Maryland Nighthawks (2004–2009); Maryland GreenHawks (2009–2010); Washington GreenHawks (2010–2011)
- Based in: Washington, D.C.
- Arena: Calvin Coolidge High School
- Colors: Black, White, Green
- Owner: Tom Doyle
- Head coach: Falando Johnson
- Championships: 0
- Mascot: Dunkin

The Washington GreenHawks were a team of the Atlantic Coast Professional Basketball League (ACPBL) based in Washington, D.C. As the Maryland Nighthawks they were formerly part of the American Basketball Association (ABA) and a founding member of the Premier Basketball League (PBL), in which they later played as the Maryland GreenHawks. The team began play in the fall of 2004.

== History ==
=== 2004–2007: Nighthawk ABA Years ===
Logo used by the Nighthawks when they were in the ABA

The Nighthawks were first located in North Bethesda, Maryland when they joined the ABA. In their first season they finished in third place in the Blue Division with a 15–9 record. They lost in the second round of the playoffs to the Bellevue Blackhawks, 133–120.

Entering their second season, owner Tom Doyle relocated the team from Show Place Arena in Prince George's County, Maryland, to Montgomery County, Maryland. The Nighthawks played their home games at the Hanley Center for Athletic Excellence of Georgetown Preparatory School on Saturday evenings and Sunday afternoons. Celebrity players such as the New England Patriots' Adalius Thomas and former Washington Bullet Gheorghe Muresan suited up for the Nighthawks and played as the "11th man", a unique rule in the ABA that allows celebrities to play in a game for an ABA team. The Nighthawks finished the 2005–06 season with a record of 25–10. They also signed 7' 8¾" Chinese player Sun Mingming, the largest player ever to play professional basketball in the US. In the playoffs, they faced the Montreal Matrix in the first round. They won 145-114, advancing to the second round. There, they faced the SoCal Legends, to whom they would lose, 121-123.

In the 2006–2007 season, they finished 13-16. This was the first losing record in the franchise's history. This was also the first season in which they missed the playoffs.

=== 2008–2009: Nighthawk PBL years ===
In late 2007, the Maryland Nighthawks left the ABA. They would then move on to become one of the charter franchises of the newly formed PBL.

==== 2008 ====
Logo used while they were the Nighthawks and in the PBL

For the 2008 season, the Nighthawks signed Tamir Goodman with former player Lawrence Moten now the new head coach. Their first season in the PBL would be the worst in their franchise's history as they posted a 6-14 record. As there were only ten teams in the league, they made the playoffs against the 11-9 Wilmington Sea Dawgs. They defeated Wilmington 125-112. In the second round, they went on to face off against the Rochester Razorsharks, who easily defeated the Nighthawks 123-102, thus ending their season.

==== 2009 ====
On October 10, 2008, the team announced that they would be representing the PBL as the official "Travel Team" of the PBL in China and the Far East. Since the schedule of international play was set to occur concurrently with the PBL regular season, the Nighthawks did not play any regular season games in the United States.

=== 2010–11: GreenHawks years ===
Logo used while they were the Maryland GreenHawks and in the PBL

On October 26, 2009, the team launched a new website revealing a new team name and location. The team claimed to be the first environmentally friendly (i.e. "green") professional sports team, changed their name to the Maryland GreenHawks, and moved to Rockville, Maryland.

In August, 2010, the ACPBL announced the GreenHawks had joined their league and moved to Washington, changing their name to the Washington GreenHawks. However just two games into the ACPBL season, the GreenHawks announced they were ceasing operations.
