= Erie Kats =

- University: SUNY Erie
- Association: NJCAA
- Conference: National Junior College Athletic Association, Region III, Western New York Athletic Conference; Northeast Football Conference
- Athletic director: Steven Mullen
- Location: Buffalo, New York
- Varsity teams: 14
- Football stadium: West Herr Stadium (adjacent to Highmark Stadium)
- Basketball arena: Burt Flickinger Center
- Other venues: LECOM Harborcenter (Hockey)
- Nickname: Kats
- Colors: Red and Black
- Mascot: Pawz the Kat
- Website: athletics.ecc.edu

The Erie Kats are 14 teams representing SUNY Erie in intercollegiate athletics, including men and women's basketball, bowling, soccer, and swimming & diving. Men's sports include baseball, football, and ice hockey. Women's sports include volleyball, lacrosse, and softball. The Kats compete in the NJCAA and are members of the Region III Western New York Athletic Conference for most sports, except for the football team, which competes in the Northeast Football Conference.

== Teams ==
Men's	Women's
Baseball	Softball
Basketball
Bowling
Football	Lacrosse
Ice Hockey	Volleyball
Soccer
Swimming & Diving

== Baseball ==
ECC has had 5 Major League Baseball draft selections since the draft began in 1965.

Year	Player	Round	Team
1966	John Cervi	5	Mets
1973	Dale Przybysz	12	Pirates
1982	Richard Borowski	4	Yankees
1982	Richard Borowski	8	Pirates
1989	Craig Bishop	26	Dodgers
