= Montreal Matrix =

2000s American Basketball Association team

- League: ABA 2005–2008
- Founded: 2005
- History: Montreal Matrix (2005–2006); Montreal Royal (2007–2008); Montreal Matrix (2008)
- Arena: Centre Pierre Charbonneau
- Capacity: 2,700
- Location: Montreal, Quebec, Canada
- Team colours: Royal blue, black, grey and white
- Ownership: Tito Destin
- Championships: 0
- Division titles: 0

The Montreal Matrix were an American Basketball Association team based in Montreal, Quebec, Canada. The team's first season was in 2005–06 and their home court was the Centre Pierre Charbonneau. The team was known as the Montreal Royal during the 2007–08 season, before returning to its original name.

== History ==
The Matrix reached the playoffs in their first season of play. They won their first playoff game against the Ohio Aviators. They reached the Round of 16 before losing to the Maryland Nighthawks. In their 2007–08 season as the Montreal Royal, the team reached the Final 8 in Quebec City, before losing to the Manchester Millrats in overtime.

The team is now defunct. Another pro basketball team started in its place for the 2008–2009 season, known as the Montreal Sasquatch of the Premier Basketball League. Unfortunately that team after undergoing ownership problems and playing only a handful of games is now defunct as well. Montreal's most recent defunct pro basketball team is the Montreal Jazz of the National Basketball League of Canada, who were only active for the 2012–2013 season.

== See also ==
- American Basketball Association (2000–)
- Canada Basketball
- Canadian Interuniversity Sport
- Canadian Colleges Athletic Association
- Montreal
