= Niagara Falls City School District =

School district in the U.S. State of New York

Location
- Niagara Falls, NY Niagara County 14304; United States

District information
- Type: Public
- Motto: Learning for all...Whatever it takes...
- Grades: Pre-kindergarten, K-12
- Established: Early 1900s
- Superintendent: Stanley Wojton
- Accreditation: New York State Board of Regents
- Schools: 11
- Budget: ▼US$121.1 million (proposed 2011–2012)
- NCES District ID: 3620820

Students and staff
- Students: 5,972
- Teachers: 433 (on an FTE basis)
- Student–teacher ratio: 16:1

Other information
- Unions: NYS United Teachers
- Website: www.nfschools.net

The Niagara Falls City School District is a public school district containing 11 schools in Niagara Falls, New York. The Superintendent of Schools is Stanley Wojton.

Its boundary is that of the city.

== History ==
The district was founded in the early 1900s.

In 1953 the district purchased land in Love Canal from Hooker Chemical Company, fully aware that the land had been used as a toxic waste disposal site. This would eventually lead to the Love Canal disaster.

== Board of education ==
The Board of education is made up of nine members and one ex-officio student member. The board members are:

- Anthony Paretto - President (term expires 2028)
- Robert Bilson - Vice President (term expires 2026)
- Earl Bass - Board Member (term expires 2026)
- Vincent "Jimmy" Cancemi - Board Member (term expires 2027)
- Clara Dunn - Board Member (term expires 2031)
- Kristen M. Grandinetti - Board Member (term expires 2031)
- Russel Petrozzi- Board Member (term expires 2031)
- Nick Vilardo - Board Member (term expires 2029)
- Jason Zona - Board Member (term expires 2029)
- Kulraj Lucky - Ex-Officio Student Board Member

==== High Schools ====
Niagara Falls High School - The current Niagara Falls High School opened on September 6, 2000, retiring two aging high schools. Chief Educational Administrator - Edward H. Ventry III

==== Middle schools ====
- Gaskill Preparatory School- Opened on September 9, 1931. Dedicated on March 1, 1932. Principal - Valerie Rotella Zafuto
- LaSalle Preparatory School- Opened on September 9, 1931. Dedicated on February 5, 1932. Principal - Italo J. Baldassaree

=== Primary schools ===
- Cataract Elementary School- Opened on September 6, 2007, in former place of Niagara Middle School. Principal - Christopher L. Murgia
- 79th Street Elementary School- Built and opened in September 1950. Principal - Rocco Merino
- Harry F. Abate Elementary School- Opened on September 6, 1972. Dedicated on February 18, 1973. Principal - Allen Cowart
- Geraldine J. Mann Elementary School (formerly 95th Street Elementary School) - Built and opened in September 1958. Dedicated on December 5, 1958. Renamed and rededicated as Geraldine J. Mann Elementary School on February 7, 1981. Principal - John Briglio
- Henry J. Kalfas Magnet School (formerly Beech Avenue School)- Built in 1957 and opened in September 1958. Dedicated on November 14, 1958. Renamed and rededicated on February 3, 1978 as Henry J. Kalfas School and in June 1990 as Henry J. Kalfas Early Childhood Magnet School. Principal - Kathy Urban
- Maple Avenue Elementary School- Built and opened in the fall of 1922. Principal - Leah Baldassaree
- Hyde Park Elementary School- Opened on September 3, 1929. Principal - Diane Ostertag (formerly Bianco)
- Bloneva Bond Primary School (formerly Niagara Street Elementary School) - Built and opened in 1920. The original Niagara Street Elementary School closed on June 17, 2005. The new building broke ground on November 1, 2005 and was completed on August 1, 2007. The new Niagara Street Elementary School had a grand opening and dedication on August 29, and opened for the school year on September 6. Renamed and rededicated as Bloneva Bond Primary School on August 30, 2022. Principal - Nick Ruffalo

=== Other ===
- Niagara Falls Community Education Center, Coordinator - Lynnette Haley O'Stewart

== Former schools ==
=== Former secondary schools ===
==== Former high schools ====
- LaSalle Senior High School March 25, 1957 - June 14, 2000 (dedicated on December 10, 1957)
- The Trott Vocational School 1929 - June 25, 1988 (dedicated on March 11, 1929)
- ”Old” Niagara Falls High School (Built in 1902 with the cornerstone being laid on November 26, 1902) September 8, 1903 (also the dedication date) - January 24, 1922 (fire razed the building and was rebuilt in 1923 with the cornerstone being laid on July 24, 1923 and the school being dedicated on November 19, 1924). September 24, 1924 - June 14, 2000

In 2000, LaSalle Senior High School and the “Old” Niagara Falls High School were consolidated into the new Niagara Falls High School, which serves as the city’s single public high school.

==== Former middle schools ====
- Niagara Middle School September 6, 1995 - June 12, 2007 (Dedicated on October 28, 1995)
- North Junior Middle School 1923-1982
- South Junior Middle School 1923-1985

=== Former primary schools ===
- 99th Street School (knowingly built atop of the Love Canal toxic waste dump) - February 14, 1955 - August 2, 1978
- 60th Street Elementary School (Now community education center) September 7, 1962 - June 12, 2007
- 66th Street School (Now district administration building) February 14, 1955 - June 12, 2007
- Cayuga Drive School 1909-1976
- Ferry Avenue School 1902-1980
- Whitney Avenue School 1897-1938
- Ashland Avenue School 1903-July 1, 1972
- Cleveland Avenue School 1872-1976
- Center Avenue School 1898-1968
- Sugar Street School 1895-1959
- 3rd Street School 1852 - February 1, 1962
- 5th Street School 1855-1972
- 10th Street School September 1914 – 1972
- 13th Street School 1907-1968
- 17th Street School 1926-1973
- 22nd Street School 1907-1972
- 24th Street School 1918-1976
- 39th Street School February 14, 1955 – 1980
- 93rd Street School 1950-1980 (closed due to concerns about toxic waste from the nearby Love Canal)
- Pacific Avenue School 1909-1973. Pacific Avenue School was located at 7116 Buffalo Avenue.
- Military Road School 1933-1992 Due to increasing student enrollment, the Town of Niagara 3rd School District began construction of Military Road School in 1930. Prior to that, students in the area attended Young's School which is now Steve's Heating and Air Conditioning. The brick building closed in 1992 and was purchased by a private developer. The building was vacant for many years and burned in 2019.
