= Niagara Catholic High School =

Private Roman Catholic high school in New York

Niagara Catholic High School was a private, Roman Catholic high school in Niagara Falls, New York within the Diocese of Buffalo. It was the only remaining Catholic high school in Niagara County until its closure in June 2018. It closed due to poor management and a disconnect with its alumni base. Examples include changing the school nickname from "Big Red" to the Patriots which alienated many alumni.

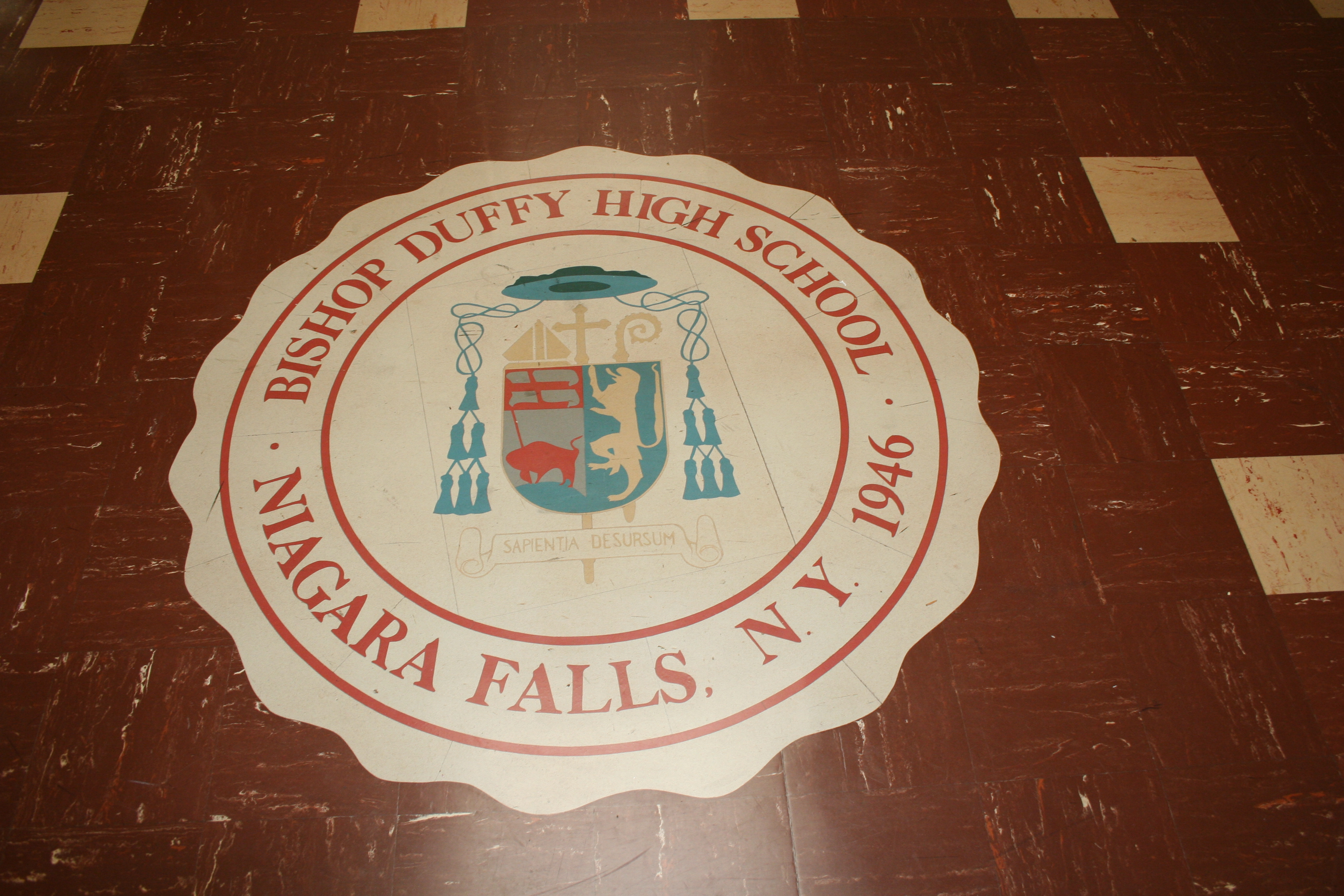
Seal of Bishop Duffy High School

== Background ==
Niagara Catholic was established in 1975 in the traditions of the former St. Mary's, Bishop Duffy and Madonna High Schools. It was located at 520 66th Street in the city of Niagara Falls, New York.

== St. Mary's High School ==
In 1927 St. Mary's, a co-educational high school (not to be confused with the co-educational high school of the same name in nearby Lancaster), was established by the Rev. Cornelius F. Killeen, Pastor of St. Mary's Church, and staffed by the Sisters of Mercy, an international community of Roman Catholic women vowed to serve people who suffer from poverty, sickness and lack of education with a special concern for women and children. By the start of the school year in 1933, St. Mary's enjoyed it largest freshman enrollment to date. Its combination of a strict code of conduct, a well rounded curriculum and competitive athletic programs the school realized strong student enrollment throughout the 1930s, 1940s and 1950s. In 1959 the young women of St. Mary's moved to the newly constructed Madonna Catholic High School.
