= Minot SkyRockets =

- Leagues: ABA 2005–2006; CBA 2006-2009
- Founded: 2005
- Folded: 2009
- History: San Jose SkyRockets; 2005–2006; Minot SkyRockets; 2006–2009
- Arena: Minot Municipal Auditorium
- Location: Minot, North Dakota
- Team colors: red, black, white
- Head coach: Michael Sanders
- Ownership: Minot CBA Investment Group, LLC
- Championships: 0
- Website: www.minotskyrockets.com
Home	Away

The Minot SkyRockets were a team in the Continental Basketball Association (CBA). They played their home games at the Minot Municipal Auditorium. The team began play in 2005 as the San Jose Skyrockets of the American Basketball Association. The team had a very successful first season, finishing first in the Ron Boone division with a 29-5 record. The team advanced to the semifinals of the ABA Great Eight, losing to the Rochester Razorsharks, 106-103.

At the end of the season, the team announced they were joining the Continental Basketball Association and relocating to Minot, North Dakota. The Minot SkyRockets spent three years in North Dakota, losing the 2008 CBA finals to the Oklahoma Cavalry 3-2 before disbanding in 2009.

== 2006–07 ==
DayShawn Wright, Dee Brown, Marco Killingsworth, Ryan Hollins, Pele Paelay, and Ed Nelson were selected in the 2006 CBA Draft.

== 2007–2008 ==
In the 2007 draft, Larry Turner, Brad Brickens, Jeremy Overstreet, James Hughes, Courtney Bohannon, Avis Wyatt, and Adam Haluska were picked by the SkyRockets.

In January 2008, 20 local investors led by Chris Lindbo formed the Minot CBA Investment Group, LLC and purchased the SkyRockets from APEX Sportstainment. APEX also sold their CBA franchise in Great Falls, MT to Michael Tuckman in November 2007.

The Skyrockets lost the CBA championship to the Oklahoma Cavalry 96-86. The series was 3-2.

In the 2008 draft, Brian Butch, Brandon Smith, Othyus Jeffers, Dion Dowell, Sasha Kaun, and Dominique Kirk were picked by the Skyrockets

== Year-by-year ==
Regular Season
Year	Wins	Losses	Percentage	League	Division
2005-2006	29	5	.853	Semi-Finals (defeated by the Rochester Razorsharks)	1st - Ron Boone Division
2006-2007	31	17	.646	3rd - CBA (didn't qualify for the playoffs)	2nd - American Conference
2007-2008	42	13	.763	2nd - CBA Finals (defeated by the Lawton-Fort Sill, Oklahoma Cavalry)	1st - American Conference
2008-2009	38	10	.791	4th - American Conference	
Overall	140	46	.752		

== Roster ==
2005-2006 Season

- Joe Buck
- Lamar Castile
- Anwar Ferguson
- Jamar Howard
- Mark Luedtke
- Anthony Lumpkin
- Todd Okeson
- Darius Pope
- Marvin Rogers
- Jason Smith
- Rock Winston
- Mark Magsumbol

2006-2007 Season

- Steve Castleberry
- Ray Cunningham
- Lewis Fadipe
- Desmond Ferguson
- Ronnie Fields
- Kenyon Gamble
- David Harrison
- Darnell Miller
- Jason Smith
- Jitim Young

2007-2008 Season

- Ray Cunningham
- Eric Davis
- Ronnie Fields
- Sidney Holmes
- Kevin Johnson
- Darius Mattear
- Kellen Miliner
- Kevin Rice
- Lee Scruggs

2008-2009 Season

- Courtney Bohannon
- Bleu Corley
- Ronnie Fields
- Cory Hightower
- Sidney Homes
- Darius Mattear
- Kellen Miliner
- Kevin Rice
- Maurice Shaw
- John Strickland
- Derek Wabbington
