= Sports in Buffalo =

Highmark Stadium, home of the Buffalo Bills

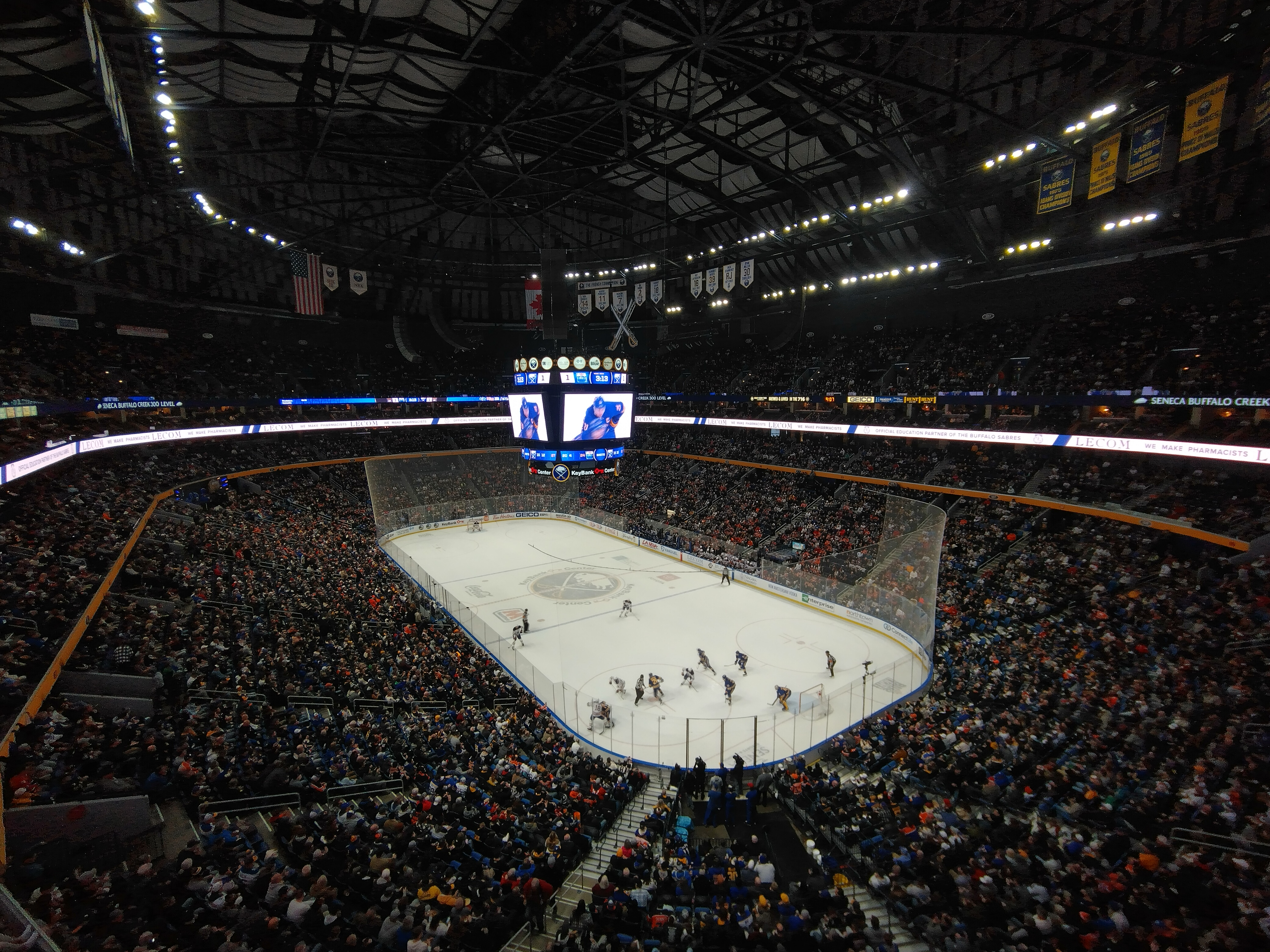
KeyBank Center, home of the Buffalo Sabres and Buffalo Bandits

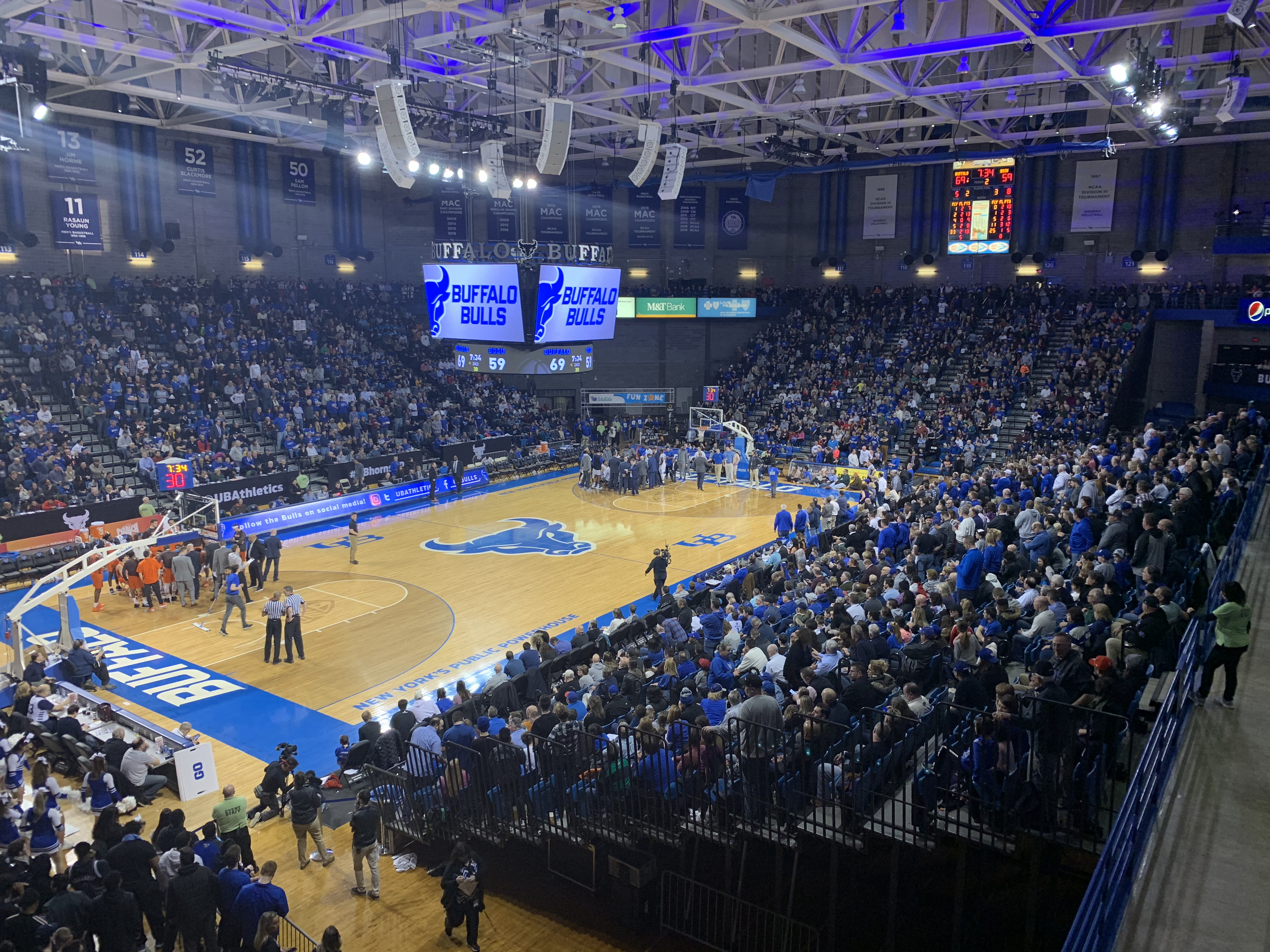
Alumni Arena, home of the Buffalo Bulls

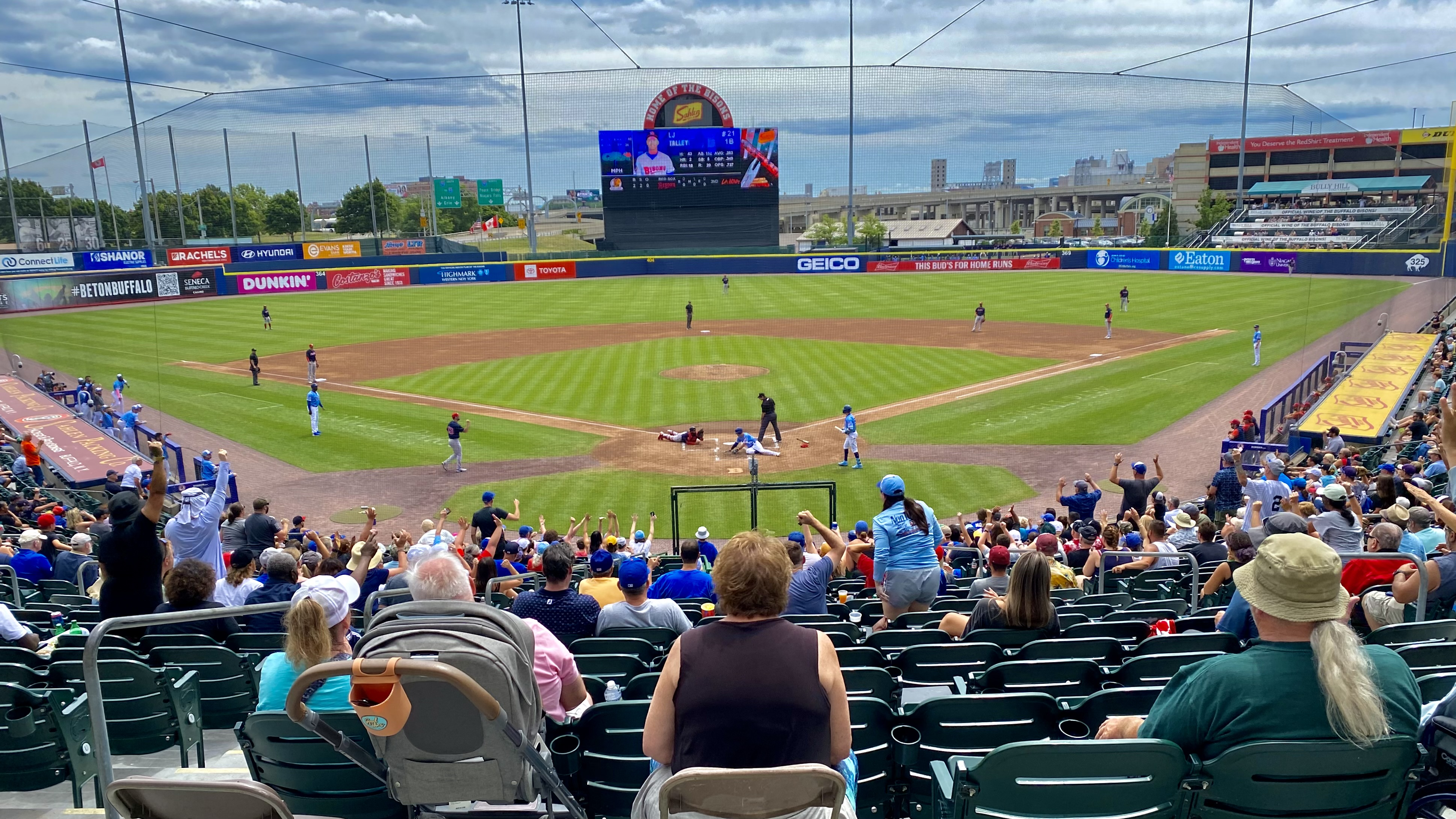
Sahlen Field, home of the Buffalo Bisons

Buffalo, New York, and its greater metropolitan area is currently home to two major professional sports teams, the Buffalo Bills of the National Football League (NFL) and Buffalo Sabres of the National Hockey League (NHL). Buffalo is also home to other professional sports teams, including the Buffalo Bisons (International League) and Buffalo Pro Soccer (USL Championship). Semi-professional teams include the Buffalo eXtreme (American Basketball Association), FC Buffalo (USL League Two), FC Buffalo Women (USL W League), and Buffalo Stallions (National Premier Soccer League). Local colleges active in NCAA Division I athletics include Canisius University, Niagara University, St. Bonaventure University and University at Buffalo.

Sports are a major part of the city's culture. In recent decades, Buffalo based teams have become known for crushing and sometimes controversial defeats. Wide Right, No Goal and the Music City Miracle have come to define the suffering of Buffalo sports fans. In February 2012, Forbes listed Buffalo #4 on its list of "Most Miserable Sports Cities." The city's only major championships were American Football League titles won by the Buffalo Bills in 1964 and 1965.

Buffalo had at one point three franchises in major league sports beginning in 1970, when the Buffalo Bills (established 1960) were joined by the Buffalo Braves of the National Basketball Association and the Buffalo Sabres of the National Hockey League. However, the Braves struggled financially and were relocated to California in 1978. This led to the perception that Buffalo's market could not support a third franchise. Sahlen Field was built in 1988 for the minor league Buffalo Bisons with hopes that it could attract a Major League Baseball franchise to the city. The major league franchise never came, although the Toronto Blue Jays would eventually play their home games at Sahlen Field in 2020 and 2021 because of the COVID-19 pandemic.

Joe Mesi was a professional boxer from Buffalo who earned the nickname "Third Franchise" during his undefeated career between 1997 and 2007 after selling out KeyBank Center and other local venues multiple times.

== Current teams ==
=== Professional ===
Sport	League	Club	Founded	Venue	Titles	Championship years
Baseball	IL	Buffalo Bisons	1979†	Sahlen Field	3	1997, 1998, 2004
Football	NFL	Buffalo Bills	1960	Highmark Stadium	2	1964*, 1965*
Hockey	NHL	Buffalo Sabres	1970	KeyBank Center		
Lacrosse	NLL	Buffalo Bandits	1992	KeyBank Center	7	1992, 1993, 1996, 2008, 2023, 2024, 2025
Rugby union	MLR	Buffalo Thunderbolts	2028	TBD		
Soccer	USLC	Buffalo Pro Soccer	2024	TBD		
Soccer	USLSL	Buffalo Pro Soccer	2024	TBD		

* American Football League (AFL) championships were earned prior to the AFL–NFL merger of 1970.

† Date refers to current incarnation; Buffalo Bisons previously operated from 1886 to 1970, and the current Bisons count this team as part of their history.

=== Semi-professional ===
Sport	League	Club	Founded	Venue	Titles	Championship years
Basketball	ABA	Buffalo eXtreme	2023	XGen Elite Sports Complex		
Soccer	USL2	FC Buffalo	2009	Coyer Field		
Soccer	USLW	FC Buffalo Women	2021	Coyer Field		
Soccer	NPSL	Buffalo Stallions	2025	North Tonawanda High School		

=== Collegiate ===
Sport	League	Club	Founded	Venue	Titles	Championship years
College Basketball	NCAA	Buffalo Bulls	1915	Alumni Arena	4	2015, 2016, 2018, 2019
College Basketball	NCAA	Canisius Golden Griffins	1903	Koessler Athletic Center	1	1996
College Basketball	NCAA	Niagara Purple Eagles	1905	Gallagher Center	2	2005, 2007
College Basketball	NCAA	St. Bonaventure Bonnies	1902	Reilly Center	2	2012, 2021
College Football	NCAA	Buffalo Bulls	1894	University at Buffalo Stadium	1	2008
College Hockey	NCAA	Canisius Golden Griffins	1980	LECOM Harborcenter	2	2013, 2023
College Hockey	NCAA	Niagara Purple Eagles	1996	Dwyer Arena	3	2000*, 2004*, 2008*

* College Hockey America (CHA) men's hockey championships were earned prior to the league's discontinuation of the conference's men's program in 2010.

== Former teams ==
=== Baseball ===
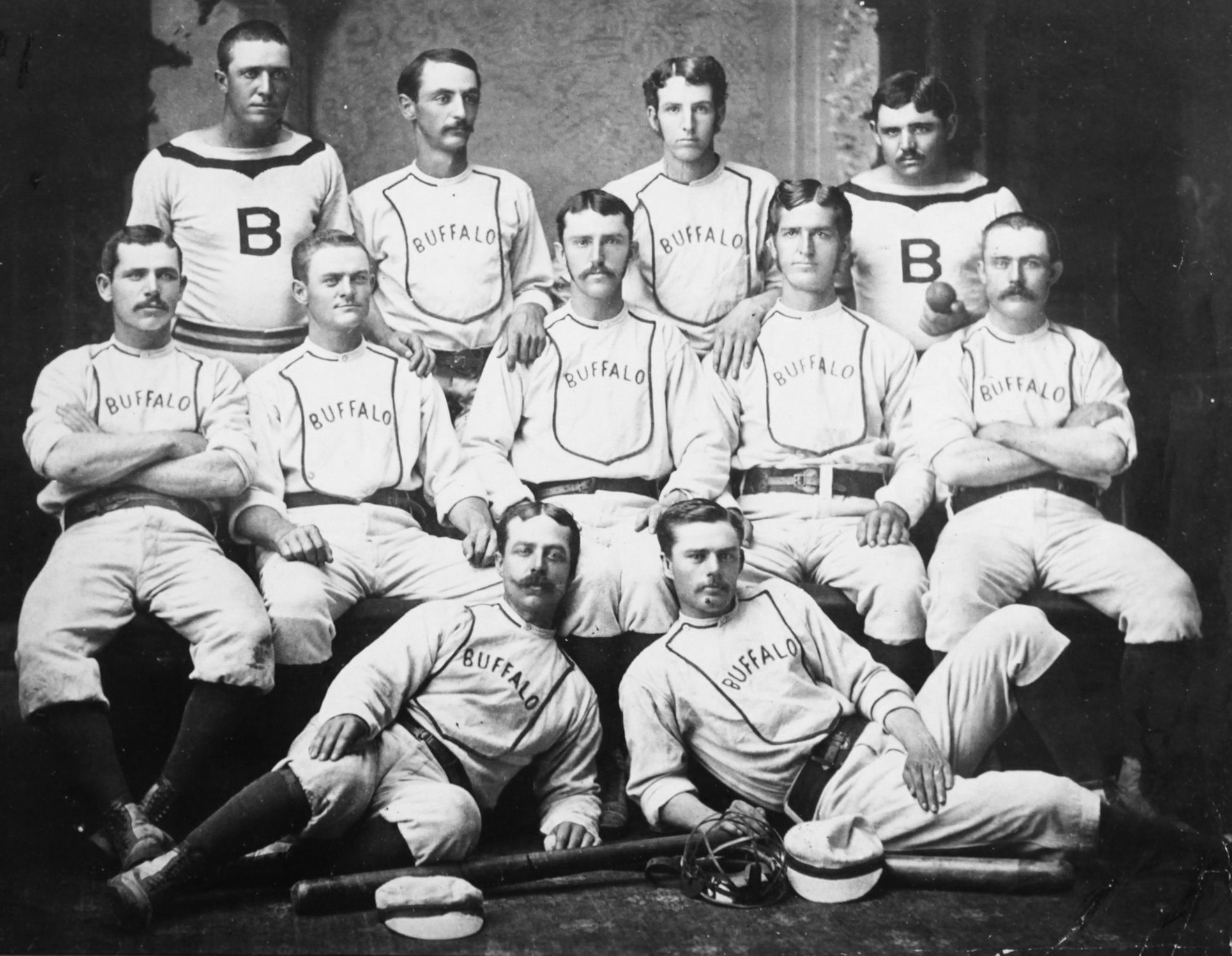
The 1878 Buffalo Bisons

- Niagaras of Buffalo (National Association of Base Ball Players) 1857–1861
- Buffalo Bisons (International Association) 1878, 1887–1888
- Buffalo Bisons (National League) 1879–1885
- Buffalo Bisons (International League) 1886–1970
- Buffalo Bisons (Players' League) 1890
- Buffalo Blues (Federal League) 1914–1915
- Indianapolis Clowns (Negro American League) 1951–1955
- Buffalo Nighthawks (Ladies Professional Baseball League) 1998
- Toronto Blue Jays (American League) 2020, 2021

=== Basketball ===
- Buffalo Germans (Amateur Athletic Union) 1895–1925
- Buffalo Bisons (American Basketball League) 1925–1926
- Buffalo Bisons (National Basketball League) 1937
- Buffalo Bisons (National Basketball League) 1946
- BAA Buffalo (Basketball Association of America) 1946–1949 (never played a game)
- Buffalo Braves (National Basketball Association) 1970–1978
- Buffalo Sharks (American Basketball Association) 2005–2008
- Buffalo Stampede (Premier Basketball League/Atlantic Coast Professional Basketball League) 2009–2011
- Buffalo Warriors (Atlantic Coast Professional Basketball League) 2011–2012
- Buffalo 716ers (Premier Basketball League) 2013–2016
- Western New York Thundersnow (Premier Basketball League/American Basketball Association) 2015–2017
- Buffalo Blue Hawks (American Basketball Association/North American Basketball League) 2015–2019
- Buffalo Blaze (Pro Basketball Association) 2021

=== Football ===
- Tonawanda Kardex Lumbermen (New York Pro Football League/National Football League) 1916–1921
- Buffalo franchise (New York Pro Football League/National Football League) 1918–1929
- Buffalo Indians/Tigers (American Football League) 1940–1941
- Buffalo Bills (All-America Football Conference) 1946–1949
- Buffalo Destroyers (Arena Football League) 1999–2003
- Buffalo Blitz (American Indoor Football/Can-Am Indoor Football League) 2015–2017

=== Hockey ===
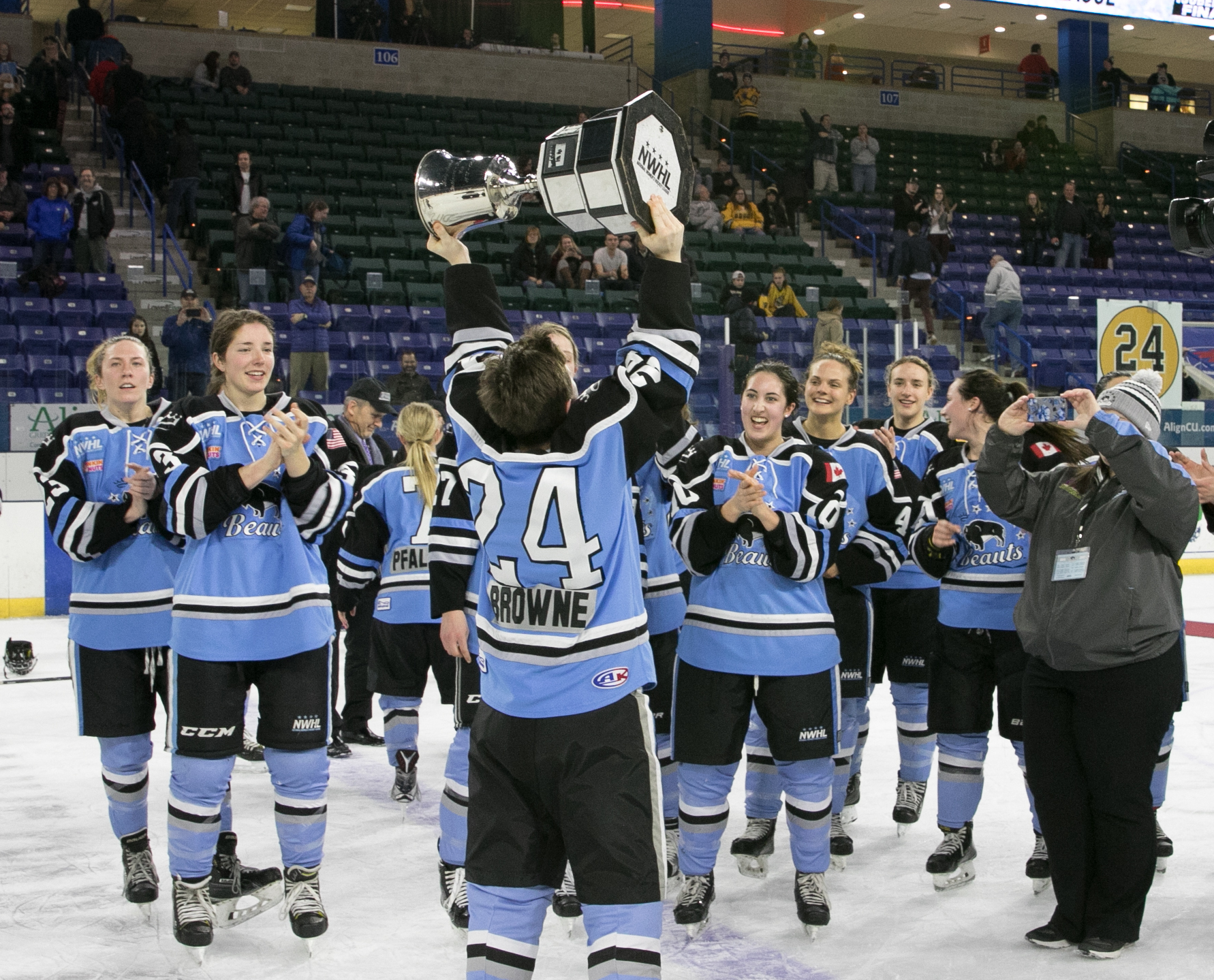
The 2017 Buffalo Beauts

- Buffalo Bisons (International Hockey League) 1928–1936
- Buffalo Majors (American Hockey Association) 1930–1932
- Buffalo Bisons (American Hockey League) from 1940–1970
- Buffalo Norsemen (North American Hockey League) 1975–1976
- Buffalo Stampede (Roller Hockey International) 1994–1995
- Buffalo Wings (Roller Hockey International/Major League Roller Hockey) 1997–1999
- Buffalo Beauts (Premier Hockey Federation) 2015–2023

=== Lacrosse ===
- Buffalo Bowmans (Indoor Professional Lacrosse League) 1932
- Buffalo Renegades (National Lacrosse League (Canada)) 1991

=== Soccer ===
- Buffalo White Eagles (Eastern Canada Professional Soccer League) 1962
- Buffalo Blazers (Canadian National Soccer League) 1976–1980
- Buffalo Stallions (Major Indoor Soccer League) 1979–1984
- Buffalo Storm (United Soccer League) 1984
- Buffalo Blizzard (National Professional Soccer League) 1992–2001
- Buffalo FFillies (USL W-League) 1996–1998
- Queen City FC (National Premier Soccer League) 2007–2008
- Western New York Flash (Women's Professional Soccer/National Women's Soccer League) 2008–2018
- Buffalo City FC (National Premier Soccer League) 2009

=== Tennis ===
- Toronto-Buffalo Royals (World TeamTennis) 1974

== Major sports events held in Buffalo ==
- 1912 U.S. Open
- 1927 NYSPHSAA Basketball Championship
- 1927 Little World Series
- 1933 Junior World Series
- 1936 Junior World Series
- 1957 Junior World Series
- 1961 Coaches All-America Game
- 1962 Coaches All-America Game
- 1963 Coaches All-America Game
- 1964 Coaches All-America Game
- 1964 AFL Championship Game
- 1965 Coaches All-America Game
- 1975 Stanley Cup Finals
- 1978 NHL All-Star Game
- 1985 Empire State Games
- 1986 Empire State Games
- 1988 National Old-Timers Baseball Classic
- 1988 Triple-A All-Star Game
- 1989 National Old-Timers Baseball Classic
- 1990 National Old-Timers Baseball Classic
- 1990 Skate America
- 1991 NHL entry draft
- 1993 NCAA Division III Final Four
- 1993 Summer Universiade
- 1994 NCAA Division III Final Four
- 1995 NCAA Division III Final Four
- 1996 Empire State Games
- 1999 Stanley Cup Finals
- 2003 NCAA Frozen Four
- 2008 NHL Winter Classic
- 2010 Empire State Games
- 2011 World Junior Ice Hockey Championships
- 2012 NLL All-Star Game
- 2012 Triple-A All-Star Game
- 2015 IIHF World Women's U18 Championship
- 2015 IPC Ice Sledge Hockey World Championships
- 2016 NWHL All-Star Game
- 2016 NHL entry draft
- 2018 World Junior Ice Hockey Championships
- 2019 NCAA Frozen Four
- 2026 NHL entry draft
