= Buffalo 716ers =

Basketball team in New York, 2013–2016

- Founded: 2013; 13 years ago
- Folded: 2016; 10 years ago
- League: PBL
- Division: East; 2013–2015; Northeast; 2015–2016
- Based in: Buffalo, New York
- Arena: Tapestry Charter School; 2013–2015; Burt Flickinger Center; 2015–2016
- Colors: Red, black, white
- Owner: Tawan Slaughter
- Head coach: Tawan Slaughter
- Captain: Amir Billups; 2013–2015; Devon Dawson; 2013–2016
- Overall record: 25–24 (.510)
- Playoff berths: 1 (2016)
- Dancers: 716ers Girls; 2013–2015; Lady 716ers 2015–2016
- Mascot: Blaze

The Buffalo 716ers were a basketball team based in Buffalo, New York. The team competed in the Premier Basketball League (PBL) for three seasons between 2013 and 2016 before suspending operations.

== History ==
=== 2012–2013: Franchise acquisition ===
Tawan Slaughter partnered with Franklin Jackson to purchase an American Basketball Association (ABA) franchise for the city in November 2012 at a cost of $5,000. However, Jackson left the partnership soon after to form the ABA's Buffalo Blue Hawks.

Slaughter paid $3,500 in May 2013 for entry into the Premier Basketball League (PBL). This was the second PBL franchise in city history, following the Buffalo Stampede.

In preparation for her team's first season, Slaughter had them participate in the July 2013 Summer Pro League in Los Angeles. The leading scorer at that showcase was Amir Billups, former Fredonia Blue Devils player and second cousin of Chauncey Billups.

In November 2013, it was announced that Slaughter was launching the Buffalo 716ers for the 2013–14 PBL season. The team takes its name from the 716 area code, widely known as the area code for Buffalo and much of Western New York. Slaughter simultaneously launched a second PBL team, the Erie Hurricane in Erie, Pennsylvania.

=== 2013–2014: Inaugural season ===
The team's inaugural season began with a 92–108 road loss to the Rochester RazorSharks at Blue Cross Arena on December 31, 2013.

Home games were played at Tapestry Charter School, which the team referred to as The Thunderdome due to its raucous crowds.

Glenroy Carr was named to the 2014 All-PBL Team for his performance during the season. Carr led the team in rebounding, with Kelvin Agee leading in both scoring and assists.

Tawan Slaughter coached her team to an 8–7 record in the East Division, but the club failed to qualify for the playoffs.

=== 2014–2015: Second season and playoff controversy ===
Team co-captain Amir Billups was killed in a February 2015 car accident. The team retired his jersey prior to their 143–114 home win over the Philadelphia Flight on February 21, 2015.

For the second consecutive year, Glenroy Carr was named to the All-PBL Team for his performance during the 2014–15 season.

After the team finished with a 7–10 record in the East Division, it was originally announced that the club had made the playoffs. However, PBL owners changed the playoff structure after top seed Bloomington Flex was expelled from the league, ending Buffalo's season.

In protest of the league's actions, Tawan Slaughter made plans for her team to join the American Basketball Association for the 2015–16 ABA season. Just prior to the season starting, Slaughter changed course, and the 716ers returned to the Premier Basketball League. The ABA consequently brought suit against the team, claiming Slaughter was in breach of contract.

=== 2015–2016: Final season ===
Former Buffalo Braves star Ernie DiGregorio was hired as Director of Operations for the 2015–16 PBL season, and to help market tickets for the team's new home venue of Burt Flickinger Center. DiGregorio replaced outgoing general manager Donald Felice, who had left to found the Western New York Thundersnow.

Tawan Slaughter moved the Erie Hurricane to Dunkirk, New York and renamed them to Chautauqua Hurricane for the 2015–16 PBL season.

In their final season, the 716ers finished with an 9–6 record in the Northeast Division and qualified for the playoffs. They were eliminated in the semifinal round by the Rochester RazorSharks.

Tawan Slaughter folded the team after the 2015–16 season and sold the Chautauqua Hurricane to new ownership.

== Season-by-season record ==
League champions	Conference champions	Division champions	Playoff berth

Season	Conference	Finish	Division	Finish	Wins	Losses	Win%	GB	Playoffs	Awards	Head coach	Ref.
2013–14	—	—	East	3rd	8	7	.533	—	Did not qualify.	Glenroy Carr (All-PBL)	Tawan Slaughter	
2014–15	—	—	East	3rd	7	10	.412	—	Did not qualify.	Glenroy Carr (All-PBL)	Tawan Slaughter	
2015–16	—	—	Northeast	3rd	9	6	.600	—	Won quarterfinal (Jackals) 92–87; Lost semifinal (RazorSharks) 88–125		Tawan Slaughter	

== Game log ==
=== 2013–2014 ===
==== Regular season ====
2013–14 game log
Total: 8–7 (Home: 2–4; Road: 6–3)
December: 0–1 (home: 0–0; road: 0–1)

Game	Date	Team	Score	High points	High rebounds	High assists	Location Attendance	Record
1	December 31	@ Rochester	L 92–108	Glenroy Carr (23)	Glenroy Carr (12)	Devon Dawson (6)	Blue Cross Arena	0–1

January: 1–1 (home: 0–1; road: 1–0)

Game	Date	Team	Score	High points	High rebounds	High assists	Location Attendance	Record
2	January 11	Erie	W 123–76				Tapestry Charter School	1–1
3	January 18	Ohio Lima	L 107–116	Glenroy Carr (17)	Christopher Coleman (6)	Kelvin Agee (2)	Tapestry Charter School	1–2

February: 1–4 (home: 0–3; road: 1–1)

Game	Date	Team	Score	High points	High rebounds	High assists	Location Attendance	Record
4	February 1	Rochester	L 104–132	Kelvin Agee (29)	Christopher Coleman (8)	Joshua Parker (5)	Tapestry Charter School	1–3
5	February 8	Carolina	L 80–110				Tapestry Charter School	1–4
6	February 15	@ Rochester	L 86–95				Blue Cross Arena	1–5
7	February 17	Rochester	L 95–116	Ajay Ruttledge (24)	Travonta Gatewood (8)	Ajay Ruttledge (3)	Tapestry Charter School	1–6
8	February 22	@ Chicago	W 118–112	Ajay Ruttledge (38)	Marcus Hall (12)	Terrell Williams (7)	Roesner Field House	2–6

March: 6–1 (home: 2–0; road: 4–1)

Game	Date	Team	Score	High points	High rebounds	High assists	Location Attendance	Record
9	March 1	@ Erie	L 108–115	Kelvin Agee (26)	Marcus Hall (22)	Marcus Hall (6)	East High School	2–7
10	March 7	@ Chicago	W 108–90				Roesner Field House	3–7
11	March 8	@ Chicago	W 97–83				Roesner Field House	4–7
12	March 9	Erie	W 98–87	Glenroy Carr (20)	Glenroy Carr (11)	Joshua Parker (7)	Tapestry Charter School	5–7
13	March 15	@ Erie	W 126–109	Travonta Gatewood (26)	Glenroy Carr (12)	Devon Dawson (11)	East High School	6–7
15	March 21	@ Erie	W 127–90	Kelvin Agee (25)	Terrell Williams (14)	Kelvin Agee (3)	East High School	7–7
16	March 23	Erie	W 123–76	Devon Dawson (25)	Glenroy Carr (14)	Devon Dawson (11)	Tapestry Charter School	8–7

=== 2014–2015 ===
==== Regular season ====
2014–15 game log
Total: 7–10 (Home: 5–3; Road: 2–7)
December: 2–2 (home: 2–0; road: 0–2)

Game	Date	Team	Score	High points	High rebounds	High assists	Location Attendance	Record
1	December 6	Lynchburg	W 127–82	Glenroy Carr (21)	Antonio Speed (18)	Robert McKiver (6)	Tapestry Charter School	1–0
2	December 13	Erie	W 112–108	Robert McKiver (33)	Antonio Speed (10)	Austin Cooley (6); Kelvin Agee (6)	Tapestry Charter School	2–0
3	December 14	@ Erie	L 117–122	Robert McKiver (26)	Antonio Speed (16)	Robert McKiver (11)	East High School	2–1
4	December 21	@ Rochester	L 95–108	Robert McKiver (24)	Antonio Speed (6); Kelvin Agee (6)	Robert McKiver (4)	Blue Cross Arena	2–2

January: 1–4 (home: 1–2; road: 0–2)

Game	Date	Team	Score	High points	High rebounds	High assists	Location Attendance	Record
5	January 3	Lynchburg	W 141–80	Jonny Marsh (20)	Glenroy Carr (14)	Kelvin Agee (5); Robert McKiver (5)	Tapestry Charter School	3–2
6	January 4	@ Rochester	L 86–106	Antonio Speed (26)	Antonio Speed (15)	Jerrold Brooks (5)	Blue Cross Arena	3–3
7	January 11	@ Rochester	L 90–105	Jeffrey Stubbs (17); Robert McKiver (17)	Travonta Gatewood (10)	Austin Cooley (4)	Blue Cross Arena	3–4
8	January 17	Carolina	L 92–108	Antonio Speed (18)			Tapestry Charter School	3–5
9	January 31	Rochester	L 93–108	Devon Dawson (21)	Antonio Speed (14)	Antonio Speed (2); Dwayne Gland (2)	Tapestry Charter School	3–6

February: 4–2 (home: 2–0; road: 2–2)

Game	Date	Team	Score	High points	High rebounds	High assists	Location Attendance	Record
10	February 7	Erie	W 115–114				Tapestry Charter School	4–6
11	February 8	@ Erie	L 116–122				East High School	4–7
12	February 21	Philadelphia	W 140–114	Boris Calhoun (27)	Glenroy Carr (6)	Boris Calhoun (1); Emil Clayton (1)	Tapestry Charter School	5–7
13	February 22	@ Erie	W 135–125	Brandon Caruthers (28)	Brandon Caruthers (6)	Devon Dawson (4)	East High School	6–7
14	February 26	@ Carolina	L 105–108				Florence Civic Center	6–8
15	February 28	@ Lynchburg	W 119–108	Boris Calhoun (48)	Jamal Webb (7)	Jamal Webb (3)	Lynchburg City Armory	7–8

March: 0–2 (home: 0–1; road: 0–1)

Game	Date	Team	Score	High points	High rebounds	High assists	Location Attendance	Record
16	March 1	@ Carolina	L 100–115	Glenroy Carr (28)	Glenroy Carr (8)	Emil Clayton (3)	Florence Civic Center	7–9
17	March 7	Rochester	L 97–134	Devon Dawson (22); Glenroy Carr (22)	Devon Dawson (14)	Devon Dawson (5)	Park School of Buffalo	7–10

=== 2015–2016 ===
==== Regular season ====
2015–16 game log
Total: 9–6 (Home: 5–3; Road: 2–7)
January: 4–0 (home: 3–0; road: 1–0)

Game	Date	Team	Score	High points	High rebounds	High assists	Location Attendance	Record
1	January 9	New England	W 86–81				Burt Flickinger Center	1–0
2	January 10	@ Western New York	W 106–90				Niagara-Wheatfield High School	2–0
3	January 16	Western New York	W 109–83				Burt Flickinger Center	3–0
4	January 23	Chautauqua	W 109–93				Burt Flickinger Center	4–0

February: 2–3 (home: 1–0; road: 1–3)

Game	Date	Team	Score	High points	High rebounds	High assists	Location Attendance	Record
5	February 5	@ Jamestown	W 112–110				Jamestown Community College	5–0
6	February 6	@ Rochester	L 91–104				Blue Cross Arena	5–1
7	February 20	Chautauqua	W 119–109	Casey Sheehan (13)		Casey Sheehan (5)	Burt Flickinger Center	6–1
8	February 21	@ Jamestown	L 107–111 (OT)				Jamestown Community College	6–2
9	February 28	@ Providence	L 77–60				Johnson & Wales University	6–3

March: 2–2 (home: 1–1; road: 1–1)

Game	Date	Team	Score	High points	High rebounds	High assists	Location Attendance	Record
10	March 5	Rochester	L 88–96	Devon Dawson (22)		Devon Dawson (5)	Burt Flickinger Center	6–4
11	March 12	Western New York	W 106–96	Travonta Gatewood (20)	Chris Brand (8); Travonta Gatewood (8)	Devon Dawson (5)	Burt Flickinger Center	7–4
12	March 13	@ Providence	W 123–111				Johnson & Wales University	8–4
13	March 20	@ Chautauqua	L 107–114				Brocton High School	8–5

April: 1–1 (home: 1–0; road: 0–1)

Game	Date	Team	Score	High points	High rebounds	High assists	Location Attendance	Record
14	April 2	Chautauqua	W 107–90				Christian Central Academy	9–5
15	April 3	@ Jamestown	L 101–109				Jamestown Community College	9–6

==== Playoffs ====
2016 playoff game log
Total: 1–1 (home: 1–0; road: 0–1)
Quarterfinals: 1–0 (home: 1–0; road: 0–0)

Game	Date	Team	Score	High points	High rebounds	High assists	Location Attendance	Series
1	April 9	Jamestown	W 92–87				Christian Central Academy	1–0

Semifinals: 0–1 (home: 0–0; road: 0–1)

Game	Date	Team	Score	High points	High rebounds	High assists	Location Attendance	Series
1	April 17	@ Rochester	L 88–125				Blue Cross Arena	0–1
