= Western New York Thundersnow =

Basketball team in New York, 2015–2017

- Short name: WNY Thundersnow
- Founded: 2015; 11 years ago
- Folded: 2017; 9 years ago
- League: PBL; 2015–2016; ABA; 2016–2017
- Division: Northeast
- Based in: Niagara Falls, New York
- Arena: Niagara-Wheatfield High School; 2015–2016; Niagara Catholic High School; 2016–2017
- Colors: Violet, white
- Owner: Donald Felice
- Head coach: Steve Mackey; 2015–2016; Terrell Holland; 2016; Donald Felice; 2016; Jody Crymes; 2016–2017
- General manager: Terrell Holland; 2015–2016
- Overall record: 8–23 (.258)

The Western New York Thundersnow were a basketball team based in Niagara Falls, New York. The team was a member of the Premier Basketball League for the 2015–16 season, and the American Basketball Association for the 2016–17 season.

== History ==
=== 2015–16: Franchise acquisition and inaugural season ===
Donald Felice acquired a Premier Basketball League (PBL) franchise for Niagara County, New York in July 2015. It was the third PBL franchise in the region's history, following the Buffalo Stampede and Buffalo 716ers.

Felice had worked two seasons in the PBL as general manager for Tawan Slaughter's Buffalo 716ers before leaving to form his own team.

The inaugural Thundersnow game at Niagara-Wheatfield High School saw them lose to Tawan Slaughter's other PBL team, the Chautauqua Hurricane, by a score of 118–119.

Following a second home loss to the Buffalo 716ers that left the team at 0–2, Donald Felice fired head coach Steve Mackey. Felice then promoted general manager Terrell Holland to head coach, but he was also fired after several games.

Despite having no prior experience in coaching, Donald Felice took over head coaching duties himself for the remainder of the season.

The team finished with a 1–14 record and failed to make the playoffs.

=== 2016–17: Move to ABA and final season ===
It was announced in July 2016 that the team had left the Premier Basketball League and would join the American Basketball Association (ABA) for the 2016–17 season. It was the third ABA franchise in the region's history, following the Buffalo Sharks and Buffalo Blue Hawks.

Jody Crymes was hired as the team's new head coach, and the team moved to its home games to Niagara Catholic High School.

The team finished with a 7–9 record and failed to make the playoffs.

Jermaine Sharpe was named to the 2017 ABA All-Star Team after leading the team in rebounding. Jonny Marsh led the team in both scoring and assists.

Tryouts for a third season were advertised in September 2017, but the team folded soon after.

== Season-by-season record ==
League champions	Conference champions	Division champions	Playoff berth

Season	Conference	Finish	Division	Finish	Wins	Losses	Win%	GB	Playoffs	Awards	Head coach	Ref.
2015-16	—	—	Northeast	7th	1	14	.067	—	Did not qualify.		Steve Mackey; Terrell Holland; Donald Felice	
2016-17	—	—	Northeast	6th	7	9	.438	—	Did not qualify.	Jermaine Sharpe (All-Star)	Jody Crymes	

== Game log ==
=== 2015–2016 ===
==== Regular season ====
2015–16 game log
Total: 1–14 (Home: 5–3; Road: 2–7)
January: 1–5 (home: 1–2; road: 0–3)

Game	Date	Team	Score	High points	High rebounds	High assists	Location Attendance	Record
1	January 9	Chautauqua	L 118–119	Boris Calhoun Jr. (27)			Niagara-Wheatfield High School	0–1
2	January 10	Buffalo	L 90–106	Maurice Greene (16)			Niagara-Wheatfield High School	0–2
3	January 15	@ Jamestown	L 99–120				Jamestown Community College	0–3
4	January 16	@ Buffalo	L 83–109				Burt Flickinger Center	0–4
5	January 23	Jamestown	W 136–134	Boris Calhoun Jr. (33)			Niagara Catholic High School	1–4
6	January 31	@ Providence	L 107–123				Johnson & Wales University	1–5

February: 0–3 (home: 0–1; road: 0–2)

Game	Date	Team	Score	High points	High rebounds	High assists	Location Attendance	Record
7	February 13	Rochester	L 89–131				Niagara Catholic High School	1–6
8	February 20	@ Jamestown	L 101–113				Jamestown Community College	1–7
9	February 25	@ Rochester	L 93–128				Blue Cross Arena	1–8

March: 0–5 (home: 0–2; road: 0–3)

Game	Date	Team	Score	High points	High rebounds	High assists	Location Attendance	Record
10	March 5	New England	L				Kiernan Recreation Center	1–9
11	March 6	@ Chautauqua	L 106–120				Dunkirk High School	1–10
12	March 12	@ Buffalo	L 96–106				Burt Flickinger Center	1–11
13	March 19	Jamestown	L				Kiernan Recreation Center	1–12
14	March 20	@ Jamestown	L 94–129				Jamestown Community College	1–13

April: 0–1 (home: 0–0; road: 0–1)

Game	Date	Team	Score	High points	High rebounds	High assists	Location Attendance	Record
15	April 10	@ Rochester	L 78–128				Blue Cross Arena	1–14

=== 2016–2017 ===
==== Regular season ====
2016–17 game log
Total: 7–9 (Home: 3–6; Road: 4–3)
November: 1–0 (home: 0–0; road: 1–0)

Game	Date	Team	Score	High points	High rebounds	High assists	Location Attendance	Record
1	November 27	@ Elmira	W 115–112				Family Fitness Center	1–0

December: 3–0 (home: 2–0; road: 1–0)

Game	Date	Team	Score	High points	High rebounds	High assists	Location Attendance	Record
2	December 3	@ Buffalo	W 110–101				Bishop Timon – St. Jude High School	2–0
3	December 4	Elmira	W 129–126				Niagara Catholic High School	3–0
4	December 11	Buffalo	W 126–107				Niagara Catholic High School	4–0

January: 1–5 (home: 1–3; road: 0–2)

Game	Date	Team	Score	High points	High rebounds	High assists	Location Attendance	Record
5	January 7	@ Atlantic Coast	L 119–128				GymRatz Performance	4–1
6	January 8	Rochester	W 116–114				Niagara Catholic High School	5–1
7	January 15	Cleveland	L 109–113				Niagara Catholic High School	5–2
8	January 22	Elmira	L 105–107				Niagara Catholic High School	5–3
9	January 28	@ Rochester	L 129–135	Isaiah Jefferson (37)			Thomas P. Ryan, Jr. Community Center	5–4
10	January 29	Steel City	L 107–135	Jonny Marsh (32)	Jermaine Sharpe (10)		Niagara Catholic High School	5–5

February: 1–4 (home: 0–3; road: 1–1)

Game	Date	Team	Score	High points	High rebounds	High assists	Location Attendance	Record
11	February 2	@ Elmira	W 141–131 (OT)	Anthony Greene (37)	Anthony Greene (12)	Anthony Greene (10)	Family Fitness Center	6–5
12	February 4	@ Jersey	L 117–144				YMCA of Wayne	6–6
13	February 18	Rochester	L 112–113				Niagara Catholic High School	6–7
14	February 19	Atlantic Coast	L 113–120	Jermaine Sharpe (26)	Chuck Brundidge (19)		Niagara Catholic High School	6–8
15	February 25	Elmira	L 97–143				Niagara Catholic High School	6–9

March: 1–0 (home: 0–0; road: 1–0)

Game	Date	Team	Score	High points	High rebounds	High assists	Location Attendance	Record
16	March 4	@ Rochester	W				Thomas P. Ryan, Jr. Community Center	7–9
