= Edwin Ubiles =

Puerto Rican basketball player (born 1986)

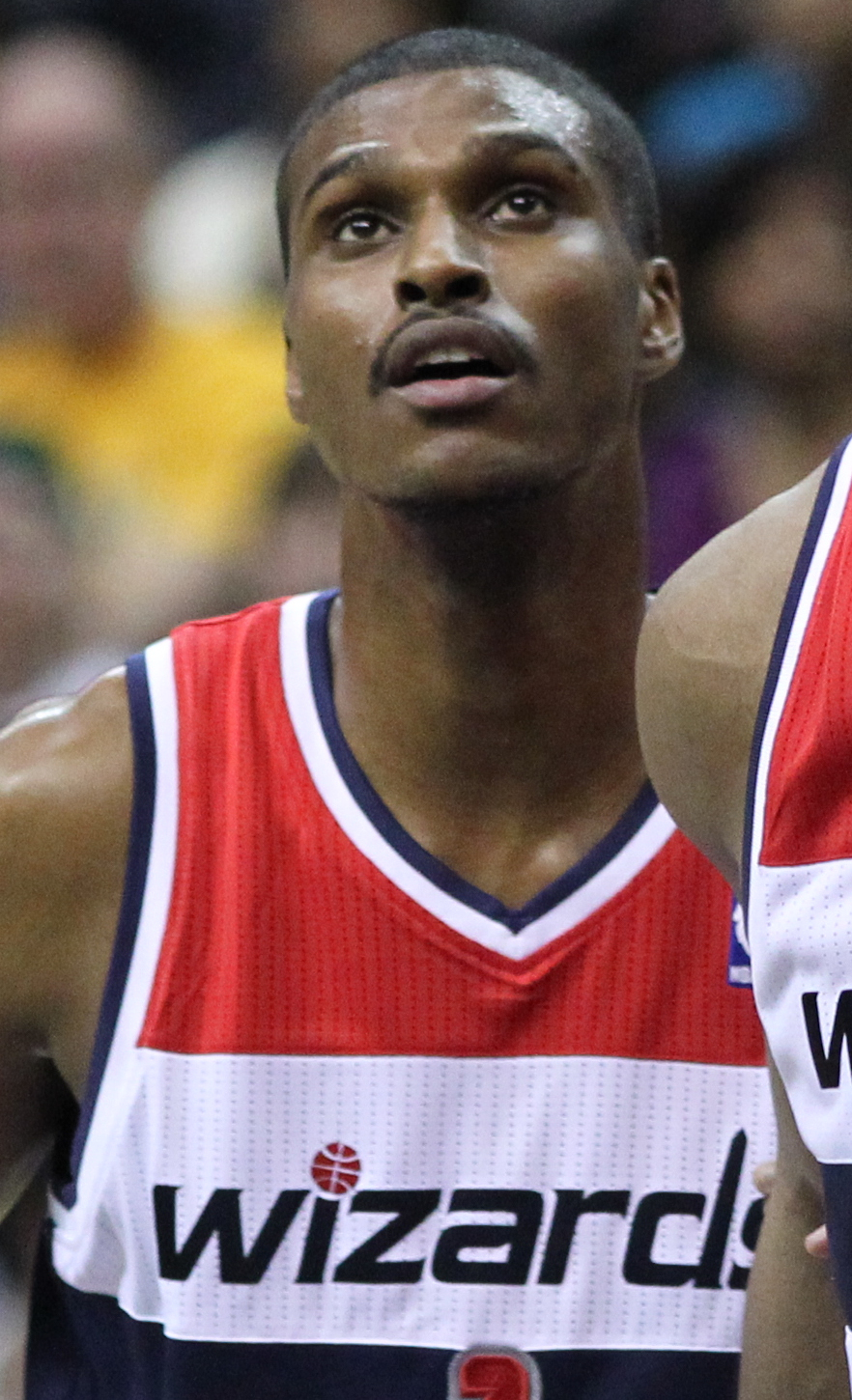
- Ubiles with the Washington Wizards in 2012

Personal information
- Born: November 26, 1986 (age 39) Brooklyn, New York, U.S.
- Listed height: 6 ft 6 in (1.98 m)
- Listed weight: 204 lb (93 kg)

Career information
- High school: Poughkeepsie (Poughkeepsie, New York); St. Thomas More (Oakdale, Connecticut)
- College: Siena (2006–2010)
- NBA draft: 2010: undrafted
- Playing career: 2011–2019
- Position: Shooting guard / small forward
- Number: 1

Career history
- 2011: Indios de Mayagüez
- 2011–2012: Dakota Wizards
- 2012: Washington Wizards
- 2012: Cholet Basket
- 2013: Santa Cruz Warriors
- 2013: Springfield Armor
- 2013–2014: Kyoto Hannaryz
- 2014: Maccabi Ashdod
- 2015: Atenienses de Manatí
- 2015: Vaqueros de Bayamón
- 2016: Caciques de Humacao
- 2016–2017: Chautauqua Hurricane
- 2017: Gallitos de Isabela
- 2018–2019: Albany Patroons

Career highlights
- All-NBA D-League First Team (2012); NBA D-League Rookie of the Year (2012); NBA D-League All-Rookie First Team (2012); NAPB Most Valuable Player (2018); 2× First-team All-MAAC (2008, 2009); Second-team All-MAAC (2010); MAAC Co-Rookie of the Year (2007); MAAC All-Rookie Team (2007)
- Stats at NBA.com
- Stats at Basketball Reference
Medals
Men's basketball
Representing Puerto Rico
Pan American Games
Gold medal – first place	2011 Mexico	Team competition

Edwin Ubiles (born November 26, 1986) is a Puerto Rican former professional basketball player. He played college basketball for Siena College. A native of Poughkeepsie, New York, he averaged 14.8 points per game over his four seasons at Siena, where he finished third on the school's all-time scoring list with 1,939 points.

== Professional career ==
In November 2011, Ubiles joined the Dakota Wizards of the NBA Development League. He played in the 2012 D-League All-Star Game, and on March 18, 2012, he signed a 10-day contract with the Washington Wizards. He became the first player from Siena College to play in a regular season NBA game when he debuted with the Wizards on March 21, 2012. After his contract expired, he rejoined the Dakota Wizards. On April 20, 2012, Ubiles was selected as the D-League Rookie of the Year after averaging averaged 19.6 points, 5.0 rebounds and 3.1 assists. He was also named to the All-NBA D-League First Team and All-Rookie First Team.

On September 9, 2012, Ubiles signed with Cholet Basket of France. However, he was released by the club a month later due to his wish to rehabilitate his injured foot at home in the United States. On January 11, 2013, he was acquired by the Santa Cruz Warriors of the NBA Development League. He was traded to the Springfield Armor on March 5, 2013.

On September 10, 2013, Ubiles signed with Kyoto Hannaryz of Japan for the 2013–14 bj league season. In 50 games for Kyoto, he averaged 15.5 points, 3.8 rebounds, 2.2 assists and 1.0 steals per game.

On August 1, 2014, Ubiles signed a one-year deal with Maccabi Ashdod of the Israeli Basketball Premier League. In November 2014, he parted ways with Ashdod after appearing in six league games. He later moved back to Puerto Rico where he played for Atenienses de Manatí and Vaqueros de Bayamón in 2015.

In November 2015, Ubiles signed with Caciques de Humacao for the 2016 BSN season.

On December 29, 2016, Ubiles signed with the Chautauqua Hurricane of the Premier Basketball League.

In December 2017, Ubiles signed with the Albany Patroons of the North American Premier Basketball.

In June 2018, Ubiles signed with Leones de Ponce for the 2018 BSN season.

== Personal life ==
Ubiles has twin daughters, Laila and Thalia.

== Career statistics ==
Legend
GP	Games played	GS	Games started	MPG	Minutes per game
FG%	Field goal percentage	3P%	3-point field goal percentage	FT%	Free throw percentage
RPG	Rebounds per game	APG	Assists per game	SPG	Steals per game
BPG	Blocks per game	PPG	Points per game	**Bold**	Career high

=== NBA ===
Year	Team	GP	GS	MPG	FG%	3P%	FT%	RPG	APG	SPG	BPG	PPG
2011–12	Washington	4	0	13.0	.278	.200	1.000	2.5	.3	.3	.3	3.5
Career		4	0	13.0	.278	.200	1.000	2.5	.3	.3	.3	3.5

=== College ===
All statistics per Sports Reference.

Year	Team	GP	GS	MPG	FG%	3P%	FT%	RPG	APG	SPG	BPG	PPG
2006–07	Siena	32	26	28.2	.495	.271	**.717**	4.0	**2.3**	1.0	.7	11.8
2007–08	Siena	34	33	33.2	**.526**	**.420**	.704	4.4	1.7	1.2	**1.0**	**17.0**
2008–09	Siena	**35**	**34**	**33.5**	.493	.309	.636	**4.9**	2.1	**1.5**	**1.0**	15.0
2009–10	Siena	30	28	30.9	.472	.397	.659	3.7	2.2	1.1	.2	15.3
Career		131	121	31.5	.497	.353	.672	4.3	2.1	1.2	.7	14.8
