= Alden Central School District =

School district in New York, United States

Location
- Alden, New York

District information
- Motto: Excellence In Education
- Grades: K–12
- Superintendent: Adam Stoltman
- Schools: 4

Students and staff
- District mascot: Bulldogs

Other information
- Website: aldenschools.org

Alden Central School District is a school district in Alden, New York, United States. The district operates four schools: Alden High School, Alden Middle School, Alden Intermediate School, and Alden Primary School.

== Office Location ==
The district offices are located at 13190 Park Street.

=== Selected Former Superintendents ===
Previous Assignment and Reason for Departure denoted in parentheses

- Dr. Wilson Conrad- 1958-1973
- Dr. Larry Morris- 1973-1979
- Mr. Thomas Boedicker – 1986–1997 (unknown, named Superintendent of West Islip City School District)
- Dr. Merton L. Haynes [Interim] April–August 1997 (Interim Superintendent - West Seneca Central School District, named Interim Superintendent of Depew Union Free School District)
- Dr. Donald W. Raw Jr. 1997–2001 (Superintendent – military leave 2001–2002)
- Mrs. Margaret A. Ryan (Interim) 2001–2002 (Principal – Alden Primary School, retired)
- Dr. Donald W. Raw Jr. 2002–2006 (Superintendent on Leave – Alden Central Schools, named Superintendent of Canandaigua City School District)

== Alden High School ==
Alden Senior High School
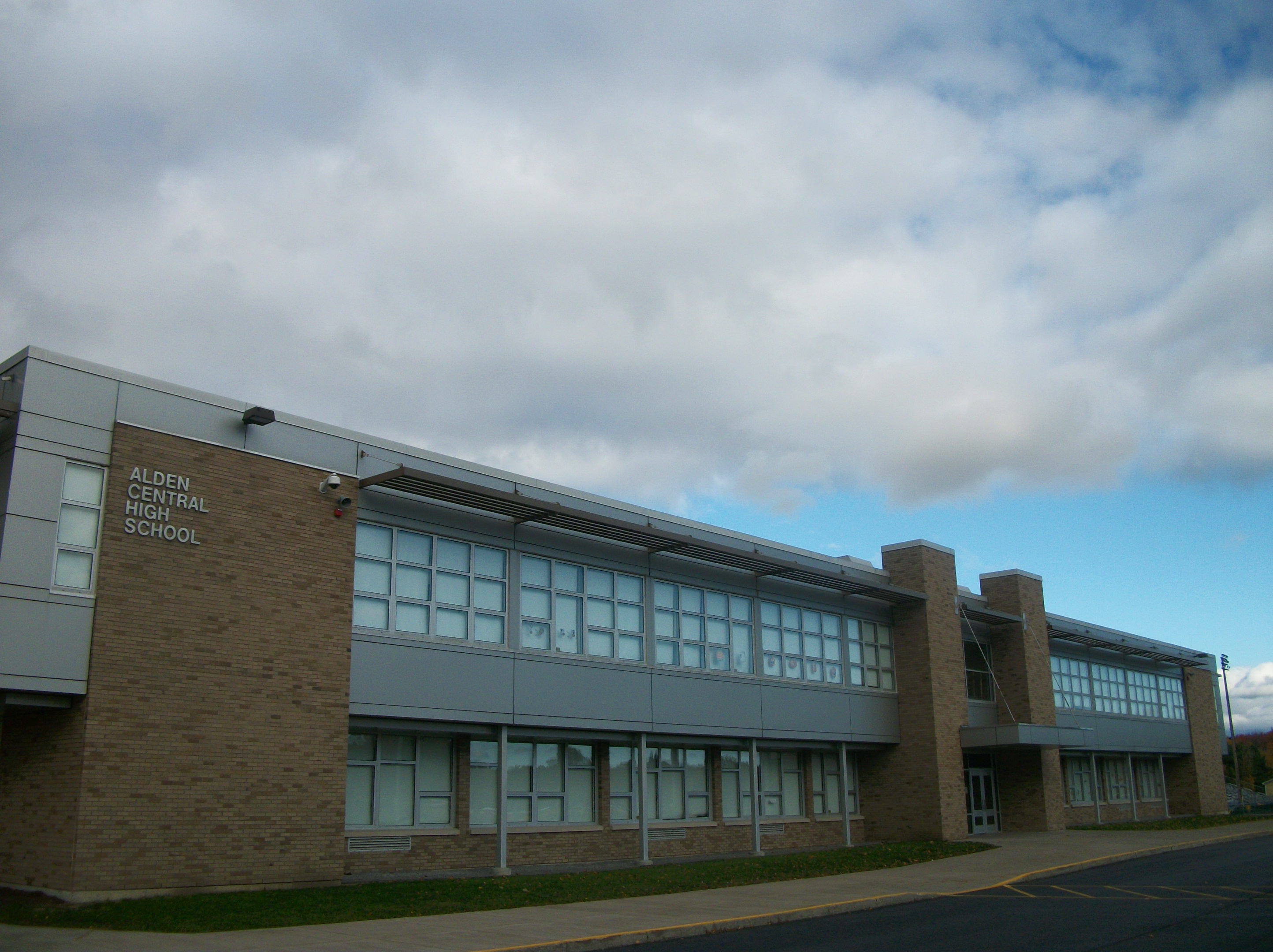

Location
- 13190 Park Street; Alden, Erie, New York 14004

Information
- Opened: 1966
- NCES School ID: 360255000039
- Principal: Patrick Quast
- Grades: 9-12
- Colors: Blue and Gold
- Website: Alden High School

Alden Senior High School is located at 13190 Park Street and serves grades 9 through 12. The current principal is Patrick Quast, and the current assistant principal is William MacCowan.

=== History ===
Alden High School opened in September 1966.

In 2011 and 2012, Alden's football team was Class B Champions in Section VI, and was ranked 2nd in the state by MaxPreps.

==== Selected former principals ====
Previous assignment and reason for departure denoted in parentheses

- Dr. Wilson Conrad- 1948-1958
- Mr. Paul Van Ornum- 1958-1961
- Dr. Roy Reed- 1961- January 1979 (Retired after 31 1/2 years of service to the district)
- Mr. William Tupay – 1979–1995 (former Vice Principal – Alden High School, retired)
- Mr. Timothy M. Shannon – 1995–2005 (former Assistant Principal – Buffalo Traditional School, retired)
- Mr. Kevin Ryan, 2005-2025 (former Assistant Principal at Kenmore West High School)

==== Former Assistant Principals ====
Previous assignment and reason for departure denoted in parentheses

- Mr. William Tupay – 1977–1979 (Alden HS Social Studies Teacher – named Principal of Alden High School)
- Mr. Warren F. Crouse – 1979–1984 (English teacher – East Aurora High School, named Principal of Holland Middle School)

== Alden Middle School ==
Alden Middle School
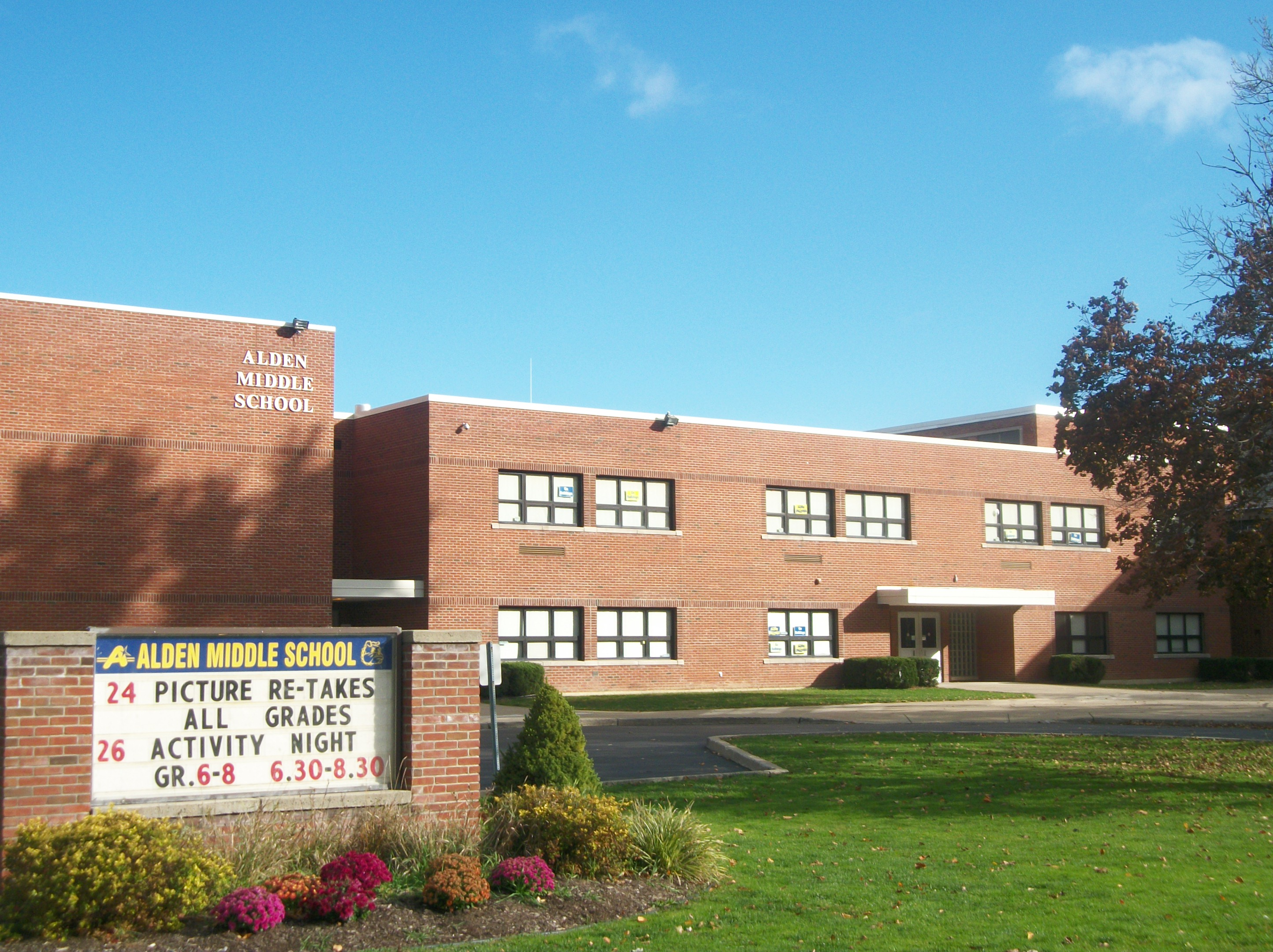

Location
- 13250 Park Street; Alden, Erie, New York 14004

Information
- Opened: 1960
- Principal: Steven C. Smith
- Grades: 6–8
- Website: Alden Middle School

Alden Middle School is located at 13250 Park Street and serves grades 6 through 8. The current principal is Mr. Steven Smith.

=== History ===
Alden Middle School opened in 1960 as an extension of the 1915/1936/1951 complex on Crittenden Road. It operated for many years as a 6–8 school. Due to district consolidation in 2011, the school expanded to Grades 4–8 and merged with the Intermediate School. The schools split and returned to their prior states in 2016.

==== Former principals ====
Previous assignment and reason for departure denoted in parentheses

- Mr. George F. McCormick – 1979 – December 1992 (Retired)
- Mr. Alfred L. Feeney – Interim (January–March 1993)
- Mr. William Tupay – Interim Principal Grades 6–12 (April 1993)
- Mr. Emil T. Wozniak – May 1993–August 1993 (Assistant Principal – Akron High School, resigned)
- Mrs. Francine L. Fritz – 1993–2002, Summer 2004 (Assistant Principal – West Seneca East High School, retired)
- Mr. Jeffrey A. Faunce – 2002–2004 (Assistant Principal – Edward Town Middle School, resigned)

== Alden Intermediate School ==
Alden Intermediate School
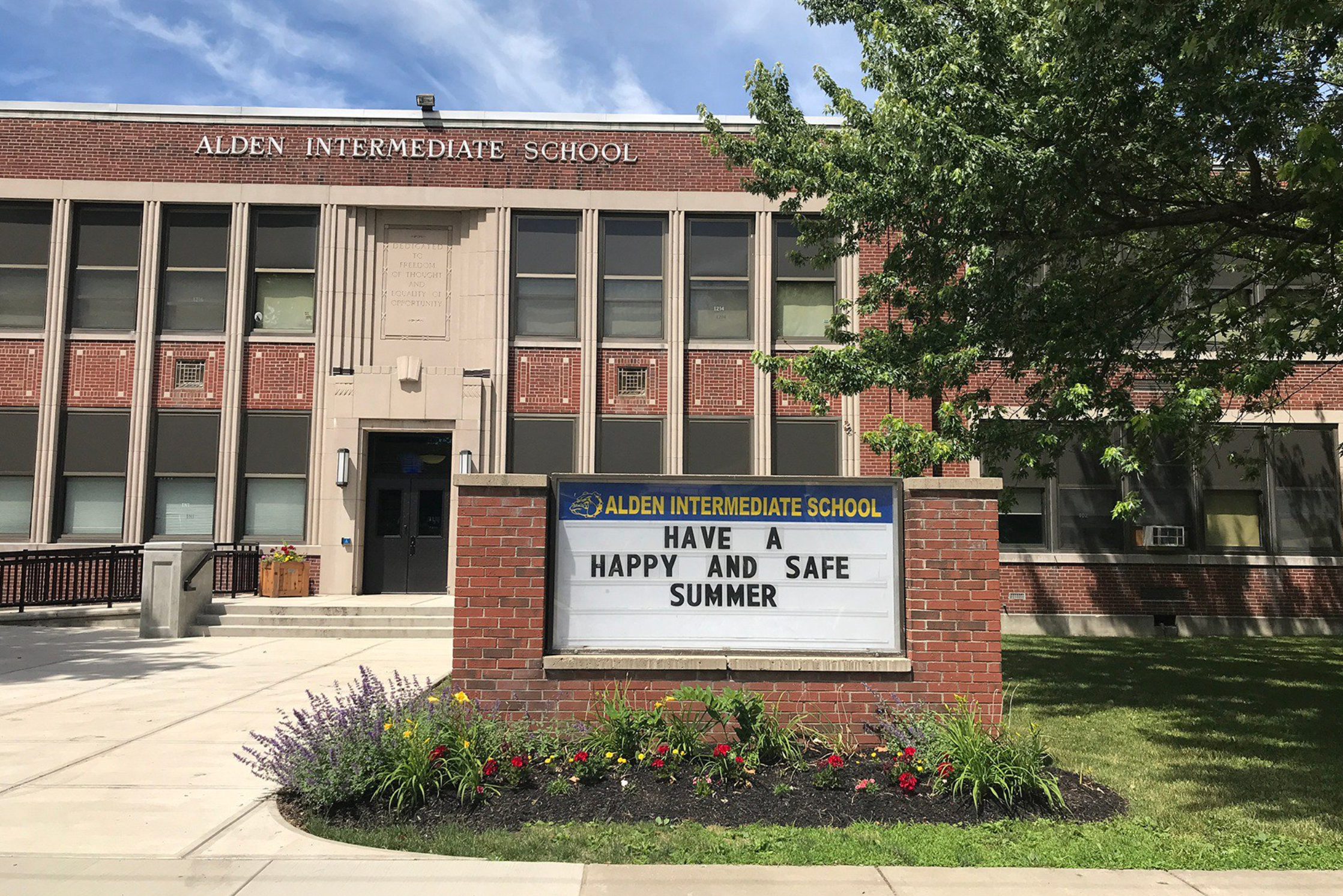

Location
- 1648 Crittenden Road; Alden, Erie, New York 14004

Information
- Opened: 1936
- Principal: John F. Mikulski
- Grades: 3–5
- Website: Alden Intermediate School

Alden Intermediate School is located at 1648 Crittenden Road and educates students in Grades 3 through 5. The current principal is Alden Alumnus, Mr. John Mikulski.

=== History ===
The district closed Alden Elementary in 1997 to rename it, Alden Intermediate School, serving grades 3–5. The district consolidated during the summer of 2011, and the third grade was moved to the Primary School at Townline Elementary. Grades four and five were consolidated into the Middle School. At the November 2015 Board of Education meeting, due to the increased population at Alden Primary, the Board voted to reopen Alden Intermediate School in September 2016. The building was built and opened in 1936 as an addition to Alden High School and was dedicated on May 14, 1937. Additions were put on in 1951 (cornerstone laid on April 10, 1952 and dedicated on May 24, 1953) and 1960 (dedicated on November 9, 1960).

==== Selected former principals ====
- Mr. Samuel F. Trippe, November 1948 – 1977 (retired)

== Alden Primary School ==
Alden Primary School

Location
- 11197 Broadway; Alden, Erie, New York 14004

Information
- Opened: October 23, 1961
- Principal: Michael Stepnick
- Grades: K–2
- Website: Alden Primary School

Alden Primary School at Townline is located at 11197 Broadway and serves grades K through 2. The current principal is Mr. Michael Stepnick.

=== History ===
The school, originally named Townline Elementary School, opened on October 23, 1961 and housed grades K-5 until 1997, when it was turned into the district Primary School, grades K–2. In the summer of 2011, the district consolidated and brought third grade over from the Intermediate campus. The third grade returned to the Intermediate School in 2016.

==== Selected former principals ====
- Mrs. Margaret A. Ryan – 1988–2001 (Teacher - Townline Elementary School, retired)
- Mrs. Melanie L. Monacelli – 2001–2011 (Principal - Forestville Elementary School,

== Defunct schools ==
=== Millgrove Elementary School ===
Millgrove Elementary opened in 1963, and closed in the 1980s. It was purchased by the Town of Alden, and houses the Town's administrative offices. It first opened in 1927 in the Old Millgrove building on Genesee Street housing grades K-6.

=== Townline Elementary School ===
Located on Townline Road
