= NBA G League Rookie of the Year Award =

The NBA G League Rookie of the Year is an annual NBA G League (formerly known as the NBA Development League) award given since the league's inaugural season to the top rookie of the regular season. The league's head coaches determine the award by voting and it is usually presented to the honoree during the playoffs.

Fred House was the inaugural winner while playing for the North Charleston Lowgators. Four international players have won the award: Edwin Ubiles of Puerto Rico in 2012, Abdel Nader of Egypt in 2017, Ángel Delgado of the Dominican Republic in 2019, and Oscar Tshiebwe of the Democratic Republic of the Congo in 2024. By position, guards have won 10 times, forwards nine times, and centers twice.

== Winners ==
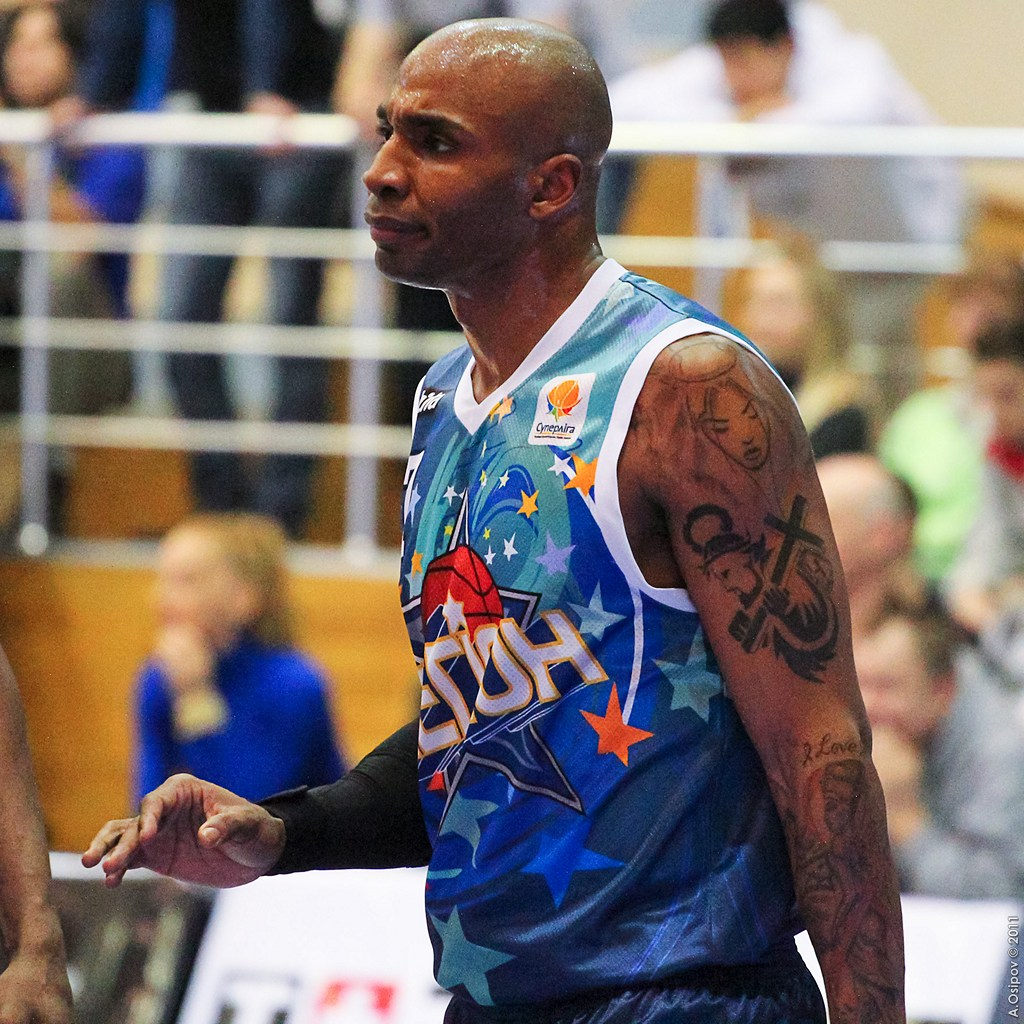
Fred House won the league's first award in 2002.

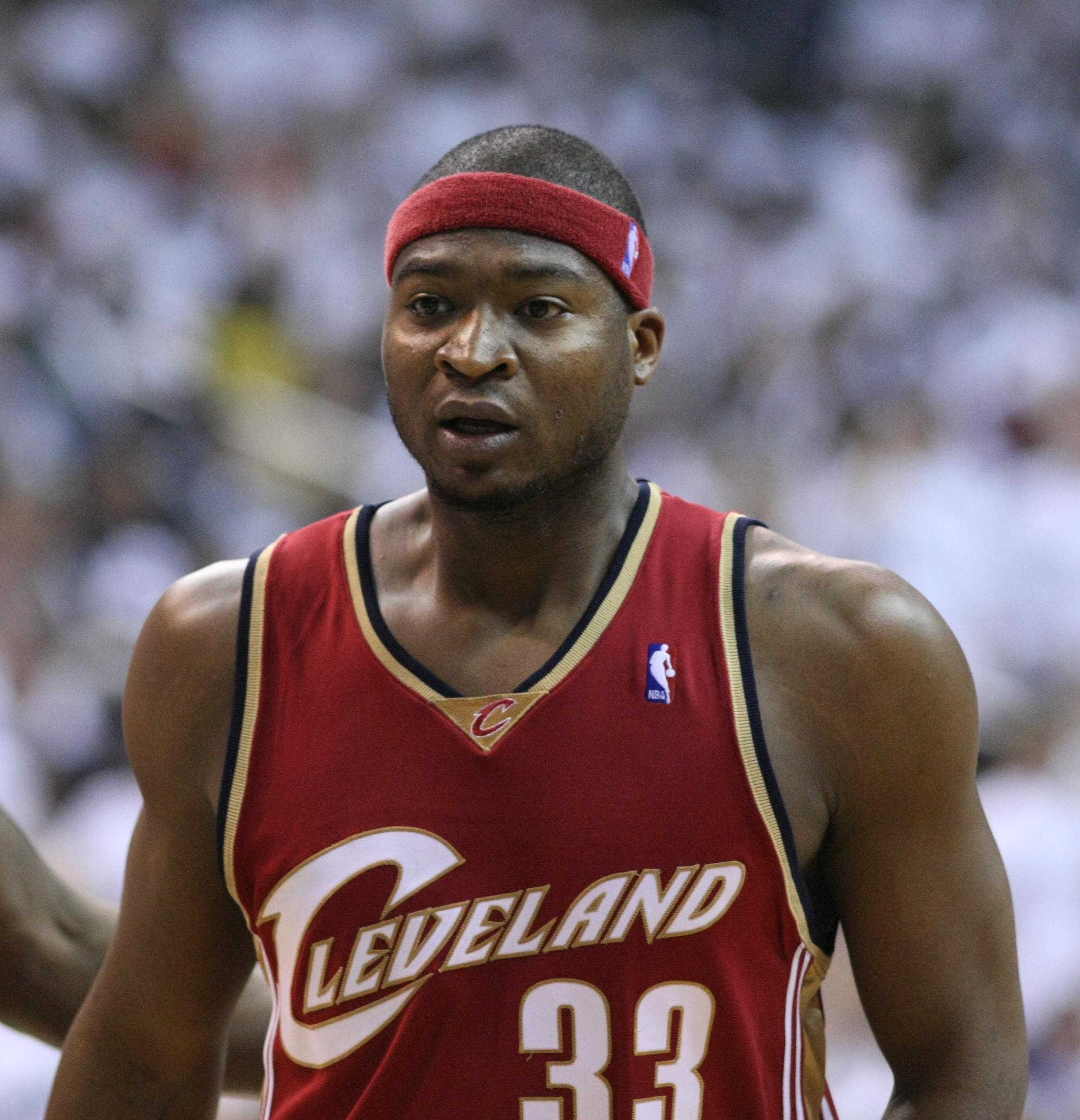
Devin Brown won the award in 2003 while playing for the Fayetteville Patriots.

Season	Player	Position	Nationality	Team
2001–02	Fred House	Guard	United States	North Charleston Lowgators
2002–03	Devin Brown	Guard	United States	Fayetteville Patriots
2003–04	Desmond Penigar	Forward	United States	Asheville Altitude
2004–05	James Thomas	Forward	United States	Roanoke Dazzle (1)
2005–06	Will Bynum	Guard	United States	Roanoke Dazzle (2)
2006–07	Lou Amundson	Forward	United States	Colorado 14ers
2007–08	Blake Ahearn	Guard	United States	Dakota Wizards (1)
2008–09	Othyus Jeffers	Guard	United States	Iowa Energy
2009–10	Alonzo Gee	Guard	United States	Austin Toros
2010–11	DeShawn Sims	Forward	United States	Maine Red Claws (1)
2011–12	Edwin Ubiles	Forward	Puerto Rico/ United States	Dakota Wizards (2)
2012–13	Tony Mitchell	Forward	United States	Fort Wayne Mad Ants
2013–14	Robert Covington	Forward	United States	Rio Grande Valley Vipers
2014–15	Tim Frazier	Guard	United States	Maine Red Claws (2)
2015–16	Quinn Cook	Guard	United States	Canton Charge
2016–17	Abdel Nader	Forward	Egypt/ United States	Maine Red Claws (3)
2017–18	Antonio Blakeney	Guard	United States	Windy City Bulls
2018–19	Ángel Delgado	Center	Dominican Republic	Agua Caliente Clippers
2019–20	Tremont Waters	Guard	Puerto Rico	Maine Red Claws (4)
2020–21	Paul Reed	Forward	United States	Delaware Blue Coats
2021–22	Mac McClung	Guard	United States	South Bay Lakers
2022–23	Kenneth Lofton Jr.	Forward	United States	Memphis Hustle
2023–24	Oscar Tshiebwe	Center	Democratic Republic of the Congo	Indiana Mad Ants (2)
2024–25	Trey Alexander	Guard	United States	Grand Rapids Gold
2025–26	Sean Pedulla	Guard	United States	San Diego Clippers

== See also ==
- NBA Rookie of the Year Award
