= Fred House =

American basketball player

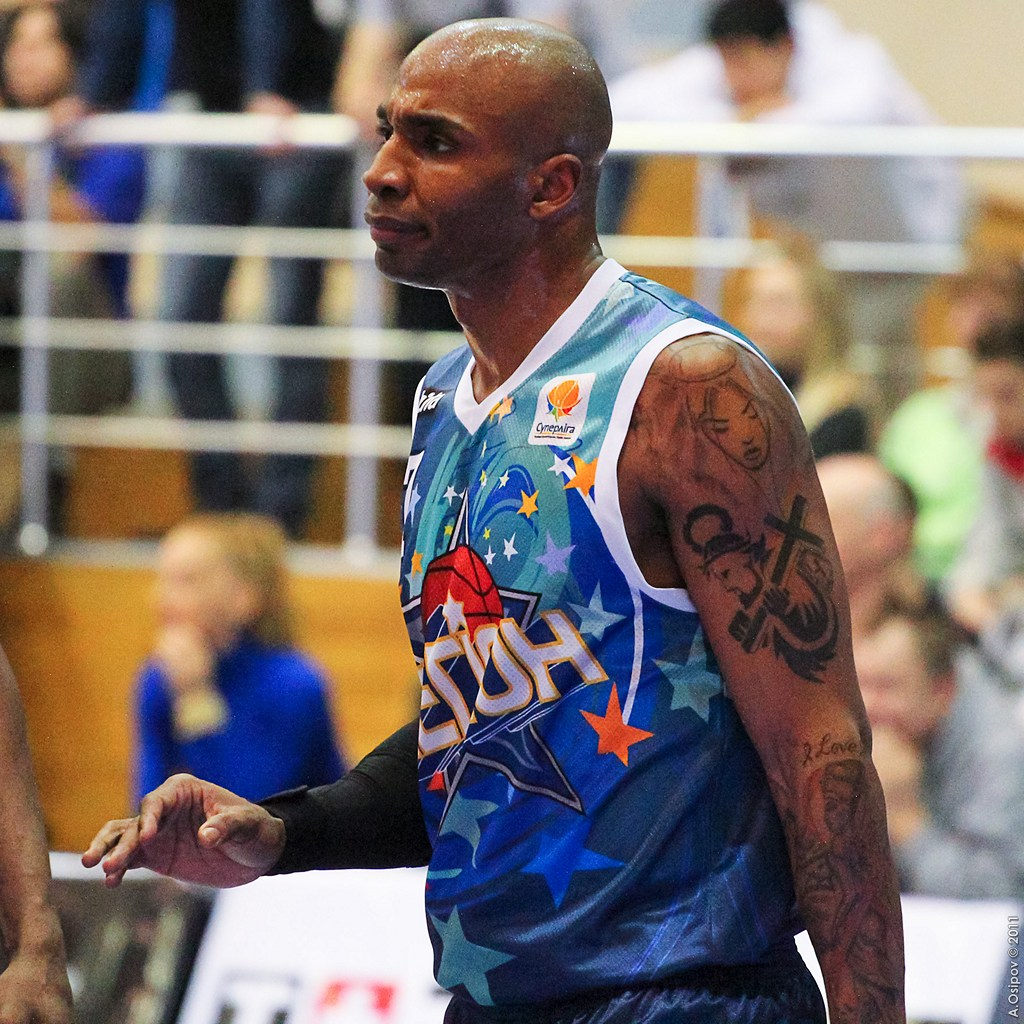
- House at the 2011 Ukrainian League All-Star Game

Personal information
- Born: January 4, 1978 (age 48) Killeen, Texas
- Listed height: 6 ft 5 in (1.96 m)
- Listed weight: 210 lb (95 kg)

Career information
- High school: Ellison (Killeen, Texas)
- College: Dixie State (1997–1999); Southern Utah (1999–2001)
- NBA draft: 2001: undrafted
- Playing career: 2001–2014
- Position: Shooting guard / small forward

Career history
- 2001–2002: North Charleston Lowgators
- 2002: Adirondack Wildcats
- 2002–2004: Partizan
- 2004–2006: Lietuvos rytas
- 2006–2007: TAU Cerámica
- 2007–2008: Pamesa Valencia
- 2008–2009: Lokomotiv Rostov
- 2009–2011: Azovmash
- 2011: BC Dnipro
- 2012–2013: Texas Legends
- 2013–2014: Peja

Career highlights
- EuroLeague steals leader (2004); NBDL Rookie of the Year (2002); NBDL All-Rookie Team (2002); NBDL All-Defensive Team (2002); 2× YUBA League champion (2003, 2004); ULEB Cup champion (2005); Lithuanian League champion (2006); Baltic League champion (2006); Baltic League Finals MVP (2006); Ukrainian League champion (2010); Spanish Supercup winner (2006); 2× First-team All-MCC (2000, 2001)

Frederick Deshune House (born January 4, 1978) is an American retired professional basketball player.

== High school ==
House attended Ellison High School in his native Killeen, Texas.

== College career ==
House played college basketball at Dixie State College of Utah, before transferring to Southern Utah University (SUU). He played two years with the Southern Utah Thunderbirds, averaging 16.4 points, 5.9 rebounds and 3.2 steals per game.

As a junior, he led SUU in scoring (14.8 ppg) and rebounding (5.9 rpg). As a senior, he started all 31 games and led the team in scoring 15 times, averaging 17.8 points per game.

== Professional career ==
After graduation from college, House spent the 2001–02 season with North Charleston Lowgators of the NBA Development League (NBDL), where he was named the league's Rookie of the Year. He averaged 13.4 ppg and 4.5 rpg in 56 starts in helping lead the club to an NBDL-best 36–20 regular season mark and a berth in the NBDL Finals. Later in 2002, he also played for the Adirondack Wildcats of the United States Basketball League (USBL).

In the 2002–03 season, House began his overseas career, signing for ex-European champions Partizan from Serbia. He scored a EuroLeague career-high 39 points in a game against Cibona on November 27, 2003. He also led the 2003–04 Euroleague in steals with 3.3 per game.

From 2004 and 2006, House played for the Lithuanian team Lietuvos rytas.

In the 2006–07 season, he reached the EuroLeague Final Four with TAU Cerámica. In the next 2007–08 season, he reached the ULEB Cup Final Eight with Pamesa Valencia.

After two years in Spain, House moved to Russia and played for Lokomotiv Rostov in the 2008–09 season. In November 2009, he signed with the Ukrainian team Azovmash for the 2009–10 season. In the next summer, he extended his contract for another one, the 2010–11 season. House signed with BC Dnipro for the 2011–12 season, but was released after few games due to injury problems.

In November 2012, he was acquired by the Texas Legends.

In August 2013, House signed with Peja of the Balkan League.

== Career statistics ==
Legend
GP	Games played	GS	Games started	MPG	Minutes per game
FG%	Field-goal percentage	3P%	3-point field-goal percentage	FT%	Free-throw percentage
RPG	Rebounds per game	APG	Assists per game	SPG	Steals per game
BPG	Blocks per game	PPG	Points per game	PIR	Performance index rating
**Bold**	Career high

Led the league

=== EuroLeague ===
Year	Team	GP	GS	MPG	FG%	3P%	FT%	RPG	APG	SPG	BPG	PPG	PIR
2002–03	Partizan	10	9	27.5	.458	.190	.675	3.1	1.6	2.3	.1	9.3	7.4
2003–04	Partizan	13	13	35.2	.435	.206	.659	6.1	1.3	3.4	.4	15.5	13.2
2005–06	Lietuvos rytas	19	19	26.3	.427	.353	.754	3.2	1.4	1.9	.1	11.9	8.9
2006–07	TAU Cerámica	20	18	23.1	.500	.177	.763	4.5	1.2	2.3	.1	6.5	7.8
