= Buffalo Blue Hawks =

Basketball team in New York, 2015–2019

- Founded: 2015; 11 years ago
- Folded: 2019; 7 years ago
- League: ABA; 2015–2017; NABL; 2019
- Division: Northeast
- Team history: Buffalo Blue Hawks; 2015–2019; Buff City Braves; 2019
- Based in: Buffalo, New York
- Arena: Bishop Timon – St. Jude; 2015–2017; Delavan Grider Community Center; 2019
- Colors: Blue, blue, white
- Owner: Franklin Jackson; 2015–2019; Robert Cornelius; 2019
- Head coach: Franklin Jackson; 2015–2017; Darel Goodwin; 2019; Robert Cornelius; 2019
- Captain: Prince Knight; 2019
- Overall record: 3–15 (.167)
- Playoff berths: 1 (2019)

The Buffalo Blue Hawks were a basketball team based in Buffalo, New York. The team was a member of the American Basketball Association from 2015 to 2017, and later the North American Basketball League in 2019.

== History ==
=== 2011–2014: Franchise acquisition ===
The Buffalo Stampede played their final season in 2010–11 as part of the American Professional Basketball League (ACPBL) before folding, leaving the city without a professional team.

Franklin Jackson founded a new ACPBL franchise called the Buffalo Warriors, but his team folded midway through the 2011–12 season.

Jackson then partnered with Tawan Slaughter to purchase an American Basketball Association (ABA) franchise for the city in November 2012. Slaughter went on to found the Buffalo 716ers in the Premier Basketball League after Jackson left the partnership.

Amateur teams were fielded by Jackson under the Buffalo Blue Hawks name beginning in 2013, and in December 2015 the club joined the American Basketball Association's Northeast D2 Division. It was the second ABA franchise in city history, following the Buffalo Sharks.

Home games were to be played at Bishop Timon – St. Jude High School.

=== 2015–2017: Failed seasons in ABA ===
In its inaugural game of the 2015–16 ABA season, the team lost on the road to the Steel City Yellow Jackets by a score of 61–147 on December 12, 2015. Franklin Jackson coached the team to a 0–2 record, at which point their season ended prematurely in January 2016.

The team played in the Northeast Division for the 2016–17 ABA season, and in January 2017 their campaign once again ended early after an 0–7 start.

=== 2019: Final season in NABL ===
The team was awarded entry into the North American Basketball League (NABL) in January 2018, and began play in the Northeast Division of the East Conference for the 2019 NABL season. Darel Goodwin was hired as head coach, and Delavan Grider Community Center was named as their new home venue.

Franklin Jackson sold the club mid-season to Robert Cornelius in April 2019 after the team started 0–4, leading to Cornelius taking over as head coach and changing the roster.

Lovell Smith was named NABL Player of the Week after scoring a triple-double in the team's 113–106 victory over the Lancaster Thunder on May 18, 2019. Smith was again named NABL Player of the Week after scoring 38 points, 20 rebounds, and 7 assists in the team's 135–102 victory over the Detroit Cobras on June 1, 2019.

The team's late-season success led them to qualify for the playoffs with a 3–5 record, where they were eliminated in the quarterfinal round by the Lancaster Thunder.

Dialo Rivera-Stevens was named to the 2009 All-NABL Team for his performance during the season.

Robert Cornelius announced in October 2019 that the franchise would rebrand as the Buff City Braves and once again join the American Basketball Association (ABA), but instead the team was folded. Lovell Smith and Jamaal Carter would go on to play for the Buffalo eXtreme, an ABA team that formed in 2023.

== Personnel ==
=== 2015–2016 ===
Buffalo Blue Hawks roster
Players

Pos.	No.	Player	Height	Weight	DOB	From
G	3	Damone Allen	6 ft 2 in (1.88 m)	200 lb (91 kg)	1985-11-??	Seneca
F	12	Raymone Alls	6 ft 4 in (1.93 m)	235 lb (107 kg)	1989-??-??	Kenmore West
F	24	Reggie Alls	6 ft 3 in (1.91 m)	210 lb (95 kg)	1986-09-19	Bennett
SF	1	Jean-Rene Brown	6 ft 3 in (1.91 m)	198 lb (90 kg)	1990-10-18	Jamestown CC
G	9	Jiaqwan Dash	5 ft 10 in (1.78 m)	190 lb (86 kg)	1994-??-??	Lyndonville Central
SF	7	D'andre Garcia	6 ft 2 in (1.88 m)	215 lb (98 kg)	1991-??-??	Riverside
F/C	30	Julian Reed	6 ft 8 in (2.03 m)	205 lb (93 kg)	1993-??-??	D'Youville
G	4	Moses Sullivan	6 ft 1 in (1.85 m)	205 lb (93 kg)	1993-??-??	Steubenville
G	2	Eugene Tarver	6 ft 2 in (1.88 m)		1987-06-18	Seneca

Coaches
Head coach
- Franklin Jackson

Legend
- (DP) Unsigned draft pick
- (FA) Free agent
- (S) Suspended
- Injured

Roster

=== 2016–2017 ===
Buffalo Blue Hawks roster
Players

Pos.	No.	Player	Height	Weight	DOB	From
F	12	Raymone Alls	6 ft 4 in (1.93 m)	235 lb (107 kg)	1989-??-??	Kenmore West
G	9	Jiaqwan Dash	5 ft 10 in (1.78 m)	190 lb (86 kg)	1994-??-??	Lyndonville Central
SF	7	D'andre Garcia	6 ft 2 in (1.88 m)	215 lb (98 kg)	1991-??-??	Riverside
F	30	Julian Reed	6 ft 8 in (2.03 m)	205 lb (93 kg)	1993-??-??	D'Youville
G	4	Moses Sullivan	6 ft 1 in (1.85 m)	205 lb (93 kg)	1993-??-??	Steubenville

Coaches
Head coach
- Franklin Jackson

Legend
- (DP) Unsigned draft pick
- (FA) Free agent
- (S) Suspended
- Injured

Roster

=== 2019 ===
Buffalo Blue Hawks roster
Players

Pos.	No.	Player	Height	Weight	DOB	From
SF	1	Raymone Alls	6 ft 5 in (1.96 m)	235 lb (107 kg)	1989-??-??	Kenmore West
C/G		Jamaal Carter	6 ft 1 in (1.85 m)	189 lb (86 kg)	1994-07-26	Lindenwood
F	5	Denzel Fuller	6 ft 6 in (1.98 m)	205 lb (93 kg)	1998-??-??	Louisburg
PG	23	Schwartzen Jarmond	5 ft 11 in (1.80 m)	160 lb (73 kg)	1994-08-28	Finlandia
PG	22	Prince Knight (C)	6 ft 0 in (1.83 m)	136 lb (62 kg)	1994-??-??	Lockport
SG	34	Dialo Rivera-Stevens	6 ft 0 in (1.83 m)		2000-03-??	Tougaloo
G/F	2	Lovell Smith	6 ft 3 in (1.91 m)	169 lb (77 kg)	1995-01-04	Buffalo State
F		Marquavious Smith	6 ft 7 in (2.01 m)	189 lb (86 kg)	1994-01-01	Tougaloo
G		Richard Sotero	6 ft 0 in (1.83 m)	185 lb (84 kg)	1995-11-28	Erie CC
F		DeOndre Terrell	6 ft 6 in (1.98 m)	190 lb (86 kg)	1993-12-06	Clarion

Coaches
Head coach
- Robert Cornelius

Legend
- (DP) Unsigned draft pick
- (FA) Free agent
- (S) Suspended
- Injured

Roster
Updated: May 4, 2019

== Season-by-season record ==
League champions	Conference champions	Division champions	Playoff berth

Season	Conference	Finish	Division	Finish	Wins	Losses	Win%	GB	Playoffs	Awards	Head coach	Ref.
2015-16	—	—	Northeast D2	3rd	0	2	.000	—	Did not qualify.		Franklin Jackson	
2016-17	—	—	Northeast	11th	0	7	.000	—	Did not qualify.		Franklin Jackson	
2019	East	6th	Northeast	4th	3	5	.375	—	Lost quarterfinal (Thunder) 99–121	Dialo Rivera-Stevens (All-NABL)	Darel Goodwin; Robert Cornelius	

== Game log ==
=== 2015–2016 ===
==== Regular season ====
2015–16 game log
Total: 0–2 (Home: 0–1; Road: 0–1)
December: 0–1 (home: 0–0; road: 0–1)

Game	Date	Team	Score	High points	High rebounds	High assists	Location Attendance	Record
1	December 12	@ Steel City	L 61–147				Greentree Sportsplex	0–1

January: 0–1 (home: 0–1; road: 0–0)

Game	Date	Team	Score	High points	High rebounds	High assists	Location Attendance	Record
2	January 9	Bronx	L 111–113				Bishop Timon – St. Jude High School	0–2

=== 2016–2017 ===
==== Regular season ====
2016–17 game log
Total: 0–7 (Home: 0–4; Road: 0–3)
November: 0–2 (home: 0–1; road: 0–1)

Game	Date	Team	Score	High points	High rebounds	High assists	Location Attendance	Record
1	November 5	@ Rochester	L 132–139				Thomas P. Ryan, Jr. Community Center	0–1
2	November 19	Rochester	L 85–115				Bishop Timon – St. Jude High School	0–2

December: 0–3 (home: 0–1; road: 0–2)

Game	Date	Team	Score	High points	High rebounds	High assists	Location Attendance	Record
3	December 3	Western New York	L 101–110				Bishop Timon – St. Jude High School	0–3
4	December 10	@ Elmira	L 112–155				Family Fitness Center	0–4
5	December 11	@ Western New York	L 107–126				Niagara Catholic High School	0–5

January: 0–2 (home: 0–2; road: 0–0)

Game	Date	Team	Score	High points	High rebounds	High assists	Location Attendance	Record
6	January 15	Elmira	L 113–128				Bishop Timon – St. Jude High School	0–6
7	January 28	Atlantic Coast	L 116–123				Bishop Timon – St. Jude High School	0–7

=== 2019 ===
==== Regular season ====
2018–19 game log
Total: 3–5 (Home: 3–1; Road: 0–4)
March: 0–3 (home: 0–1; road: 0–2)

Game	Date	Team	Score	High points	High rebounds	High assists	Location Attendance	Record
1	March 9	@ DuBois	L 59–137				Central Catholic High School	0–1
2	March 16	@ Kentucky	L 59–143				Thomas More University	0–2
3	March 23	Chautauqua	L 76–138				Delavan Grider Community Center	0–3

April: 0–2 (home: 0–0; road: 0–2)

Game	Date	Team	Score	High points	High rebounds	High assists	Location Attendance	Record
4	April 6	@ Chautauqua	L 84–104				Brocton Central School	0–4
5	April 27	@ DuBois	L 84–104				Central Catholic High School	0–5

May: 2–0 (home: 2–0; road: 0–0)

Game	Date	Team	Score	High points	High rebounds	High assists	Location Attendance	Record
6	May 4	DuBois	W 103–100	Lovell Smith (23)	Lovell Smith (10)		Delavan Grider Community Center	1–5
7	May 18	Lancaster	W 113–106	Lovell Smith (33)	Lovell Smith (15)	Lovell Smith (10)	Delavan Grider Community Center	2–5

June: 1–0 (home: 1–0; road: 0–0)

Game	Date	Team	Score	High points	High rebounds	High assists	Location Attendance	Record
8	June 1	Detroit	W 135–102	Lovell Smith (39)	Lovell Smith (16)	Jamaal Carter (12)	Delavan Grider Community Center	3–5

==== Playoffs ====
2019 playoff game log
Total: 0–1 (home: 0–0; road: 0–1)
Quarterfinals: 0–1 (home: 0–0; road: 0–1)

Game	Date	Team	Score	High points	High rebounds	High assists	Location Attendance	Series
1	June 22	@ Lancaster	L 99–121				Lancaster High School	0–1
