= Coaches All-America Game =

Coaches All-America Game (defunct)
- Stadium: Clifford B. and Audrey Jones Stadium
- Location: Lubbock, Texas
- Previous stadiums: War Memorial Stadium; Atlanta Stadium
- Previous locations: Buffalo, New York; Atlanta
- Operated: 1961–1976

Sponsors
- American Football Coaches Association

Former names
- Graduation Bowl (1961)

The Coaches All-America Game was a postseason college football all-star game that served as the concluding game of the college football season, held from 1961 to 1976. All 15 games in the series were played sometime between mid-June and mid-July, usually that last week of June. The all-star game was sponsored by the American Football Coaches Association (AFCA) and profits from ticket sales and television rights went to fund AFCA scholarships.

From 1961 to 1965, the game was played at War Memorial Stadium in Buffalo, New York. The game moved to Atlanta Stadium from 1966 to 1969. Attendance issues led to the game being relocated to Jones Stadium in Lubbock, Texas, where it was held from 1970–1975. Lubbock won the bid to host the game over newer stadiums in larger cities, including Memorial Stadium in Memphis, Tennessee and San Diego Stadium in San Diego, after the AFCA was convinced that Lubbock's advantages as a college town without competing entertainment would fill the stands with existing college football fans from West Texas.

The first game held at Jones Stadium took place only 47 days after downtown Lubbock was hit by a tornado in 1970. The stadium's newly installed AstroTurf was unharmed, but some of the light towers on the west side—which had recently been fitted with extra lights for the color telecast of the All-America Game—were bent or snapped off. Even with the surrounding circumstances, the inaugural Jones Stadium game drew 42,150 in attendance, a record attendance over any prior Coaches All-America Game in Buffalo or Atlanta. The game finally found success by an attendance standard, drawing 285,786 attendees over 7 years. By the time of the final Coaches All-America Game in 1976, more players declined to participate in the college all-star game as National Football League rookies and NFL owners had little to gain, and much to lose due to injury risks. The AFCA reluctantly dropped the Coaches All-America Game, but continued to bestow All-American honors.

== Game results ==
=== 1961 ===
Score: West defeats East, 30-20
Won 30-20 by the West All-stars in a game featuring Bob Schloredt, Billy Kilmer and Marv Luster (chosen as MVP) for the winning side, and Fran Tarkenton for the East.

=== 1962 ===
Score: East defeats West, 13-8

=== 1963 ===
Score: West defeats East, 22-21

=== 1964 ===
Score: East defeats West, 18-15

=== 1965 ===
Score: East defeats West, 34-14

=== 1966 ===
Score: West defeats East, 24-7

=== 1967 ===
Score: East defeats West, 12-9

=== 1968 ===
Score: West defeats East, 34-20

=== 1969 ===
Score: West defeats East, 14-10

=== 1970 ===
Score: East defeats West, 34-27

=== 1971 ===
Score: West defeats East, 33-29

=== 1972 ===
Score: East defeats West, 42-20

=== 1973 ===
Score: West defeats East, 20-6
Oregon quarterback Dan Fouts suffered a broken collarbone in the first quarter.

=== 1974 ===
Score: West defeats East, 36-6
Barty Smith, a fullback out of the University of Richmond and the first round draft pick of the Green Bay Packers, injured his left knee in the game. He had carried the ball 19 times for 96 yards for the East Team, but left the game midway in the third quarter with the injury. The knee injury kept Smith out of the first six games of his rookie season with the Packers. The West beat the East 36-6. San Diego State's Jesse Freitas of the West Team was named most valuable player.

=== 1975 ===
Score: East defeats West, 23-21
Thomas “Hollywood” Henderson made his debut in a Dallas Cowboys helmet

=== 1976 ===
Score: West defeats East, 35-17
