= Burt Flickinger Center =

Multipurpose indoor venue in Buffalo, New York

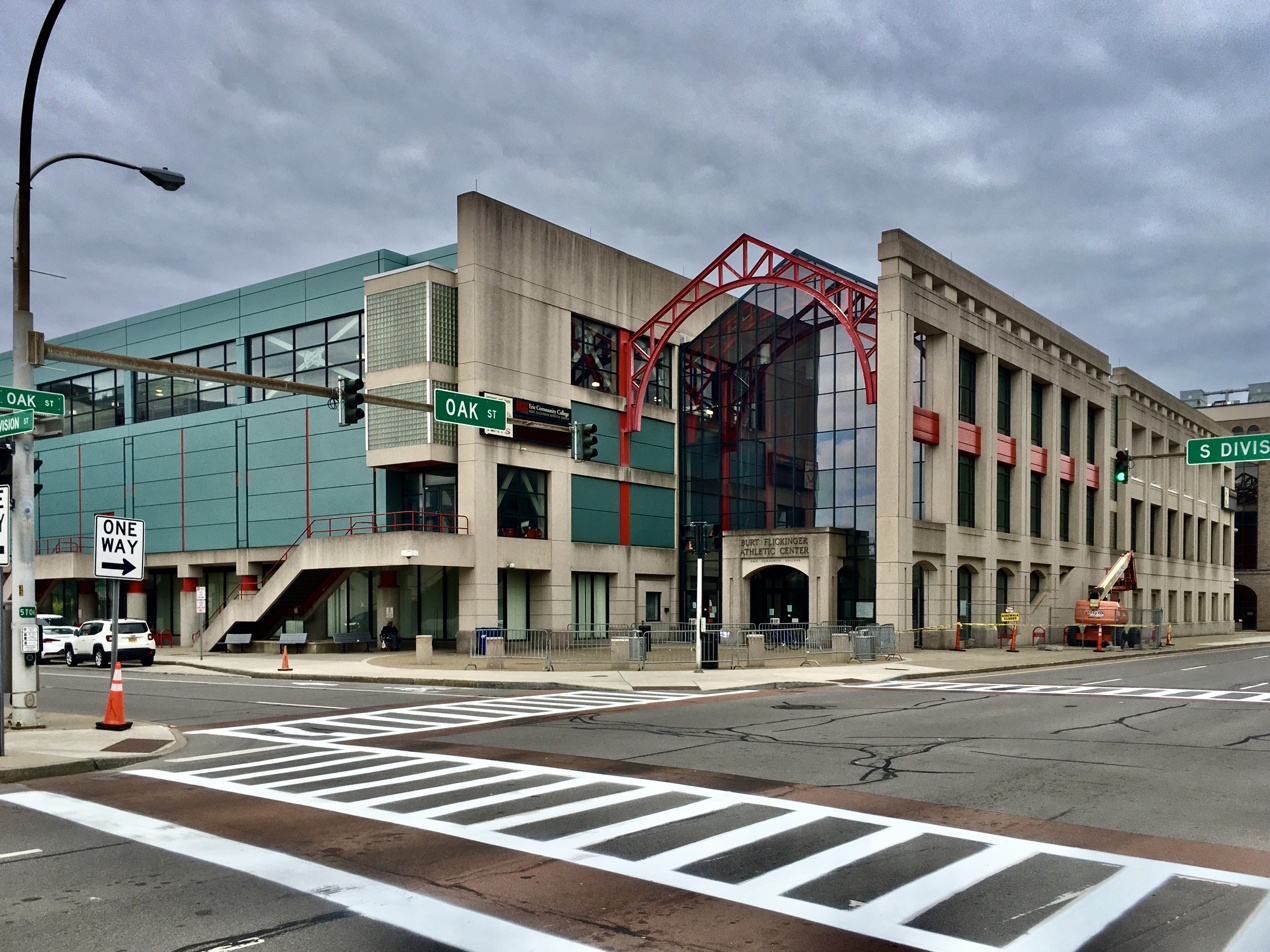
- Burt Flickinger Center in May 2020
- Interactive map of Burt Flickinger Center
- Full name: Burt P. Flickinger Athletic Center
- Address: 21 Oak Street
- Location: Buffalo, New York 14203
- Coordinates: 42.8815029°N 78.871209°W
- Owner: SUNY Erie
- Operator: SUNY Erie
- Capacity: 3,200
- Type: Multi-purpose arena
- Event: Sporting events
- Field size: 110,000 sq ft (10,000 m^{2})
- Public transit: Church

Construction
- Opened: 1993
- Cost: US$25 million ($55.7 million in 2025 dollars)
- Architect: HHL Architects

Tenants
- Erie Kats (NJCAA) 1994–present Buffalo Rapids (ABA) 2005; Canisius Golden Griffins (NCAA) 2011–present Buffalo 716ers (PBL) 2015–2016

Burt Flickinger Center is a multipurpose indoor venue located in downtown Buffalo, New York.

The venue is named after Burt Prentice Flickinger, Jr., founder of the Super Duper grocery store chain and the grandson of Red & White founder S. M. Flickinger, who spearheaded efforts to bring the 1993 World University Games to Buffalo.

The venue was originally constructed for the 1993 World University Games and is now used full-time by the Erie Kats, SUNY Erie's athletic program. The City Campus of SUNY Erie is across the street within the Old Post Office. The facility contains a field house that seats 3,200 and an Olympic-sized swimming pool that seats 1,500.

The venue hosted several professional wrestling shows from the ECW promotion between 1997 and 2000, including The Buffalo Invasion and November to Remember 1999.

Joe Mesi defeated Anthony Green to win the New York State Heavyweight Championship during a professional boxing card at the venue in 1999.

The venue was formerly home to the Buffalo Rapids of the American Basketball Association in 2005 and the Buffalo 716ers of the Premier Basketball League in 2015–16.

The venue has been the home of Canisius Golden Griffins swimming and diving meets since 2011.
