= Pee Dee Vipers =

American basketball team

- Founded: 2013
- League: Premier Basketball League
- Team history: Pee Dee Vipers (2013–Present)
- Based in: Florence, South Carolina
- Arena: Florence Civic Center
- Colors: Yellow, blue, orange
- Head coach: Larry Brown
- Dancers: The Vipettes

The Pee Dee Vipers are a professional basketball team playing in the Premier Basketball League. The Vipers began playing in the 2014 PBL season.

== History ==
The Vipers are the first professional basketball team to play in Florence since the Florence Flyers of the USBL played there in 2004. In their inaugural season, the Vipers will be coached by Larry Brown, a veteran high school and college coach.
