= Tapestry Charter School =

Charter school in New York, United States

Location
- 65 Great Arrow Ave; Park Meadow; Buffalo, Erie County, New York 14216-3203; United States
- Coordinates: 42°56′33.9″N 78°52′13.5″W

Information
- Type: Charter
- Established: 2001
- Status: Open
- School district: Tapestry Charter School
- NCES District ID: 3600038
- School code: NY-140600860838-140600860838
- CEEB code: 331087
- NCES School ID: 360003804346
- Director: Eric Klapper
- Faculty: 89.90 (on an FTE basis)
- Grades: KG-12
- Enrollment: 1,108 (2022-2023)
  - Kindergarten: 86
  - Grade 1: 87
  - Grade 2: 87
  - Grade 3: 77
  - Grade 4: 83
  - Grade 5: 90
  - Grade 6: 86
  - Grade 7: 88
  - Grade 8: 86
  - Grade 9: 88
  - Grade 10: 88
  - Grade 11: 85
  - Grade 12: 76
  - Other: 1
- Student to teacher ratio: 12.32:1
- Campus type: City: large
- Color(s): Green, Blue & White
- Nickname: ThunderHawks
- Website: tapestryschool.org

Tapestry Charter School is a K-12 charter school in Buffalo, New York, United States. The current director is Eric Klapper.

== History ==
Tapestry Charter School is an arts-integrated, expeditionary learning, tuition-free public school. Tapestry received approval from the State University of New York Board of Trustees to open in September 2001. The school grew one grade per year, becoming a full K-12 school in the 2009-10 school year with 515 students. Ninety-eight percent of the first senior class graduated in June 2010. All seniors in Tapestry's graduating classes were accepted to college.
