= Niagara-Wheatfield Central School District =

School district in New York, United States

Coordinates: 43.118°N 78.951°W

Location
- Niagara Falls, New York Niagara United States

District information
- Type: Public
- Motto: Once a Falcon, always a Falcon
- Grades: K-12
- Established: 1956
- Superintendent: Daniel G. Ljiljanich
- Schools: 6

Students and staff
- Students: 4,200
- Teachers: 208
- Athletic conference: Section VI
- District mascot: Falcons
- Colors: Black, white, and red

Other information
- Website: nwcsd.org

Niagara-Wheatfield Central School District is a public school district in New York State located in the Town of Lewiston, New York, about 10 miles (16 km) from Niagara Falls, New York. The district serves students from the towns of Niagara and Wheatfield.

== Administration ==
- Daniel Ljiljanich – superintendent
- Thomas Stack – assistant superintendent of personnel & pupil services
- Allison Davis – assistant superintendent of finance and management
- Jennifer Golias – director of curriculum, instruction, and technology
- Steve Metzger – director of special programs
- Casie La Marca – assistant director of special programs
- Matthew McKenna – director of athletics

=== Selected former superintendents ===
Previous assignment and reason for departure in parentheses

- Mabel Sarbaugh Lee
- Charles R. Clark
- Joel Radin – ?–1994 (unknown, retired)
- Carol Beebe – 1994–1996 (principal - Colonial Village Elementary, returned to Colonial Village)
- Peter T. Kachris – 1996–1997 (interim)
- Judith H. Howard – 1998–2008 (assistant superintendent - Hilton Central School District, retired)
- Carl Militello – 2008–2012 (superintendent - Carthage Central School District, retired)
- Kerin Dumphrey – 2012 (interim) (school business administrator - Niagara-Wheatfield Central School District, returned to position)
- James Knowles – 2012–2013 (interim) (interim superintendent - Warsaw Central School District, retired)
- Lynn M. Fusco – 2013–2015 (superintendent - Alden Central School District, named superintendent of Erie 1 BOCES)

== Schools ==
The school district operates six schools.

=== Niagara-Wheatfield High School ===
Niagara-Wheatfield High School
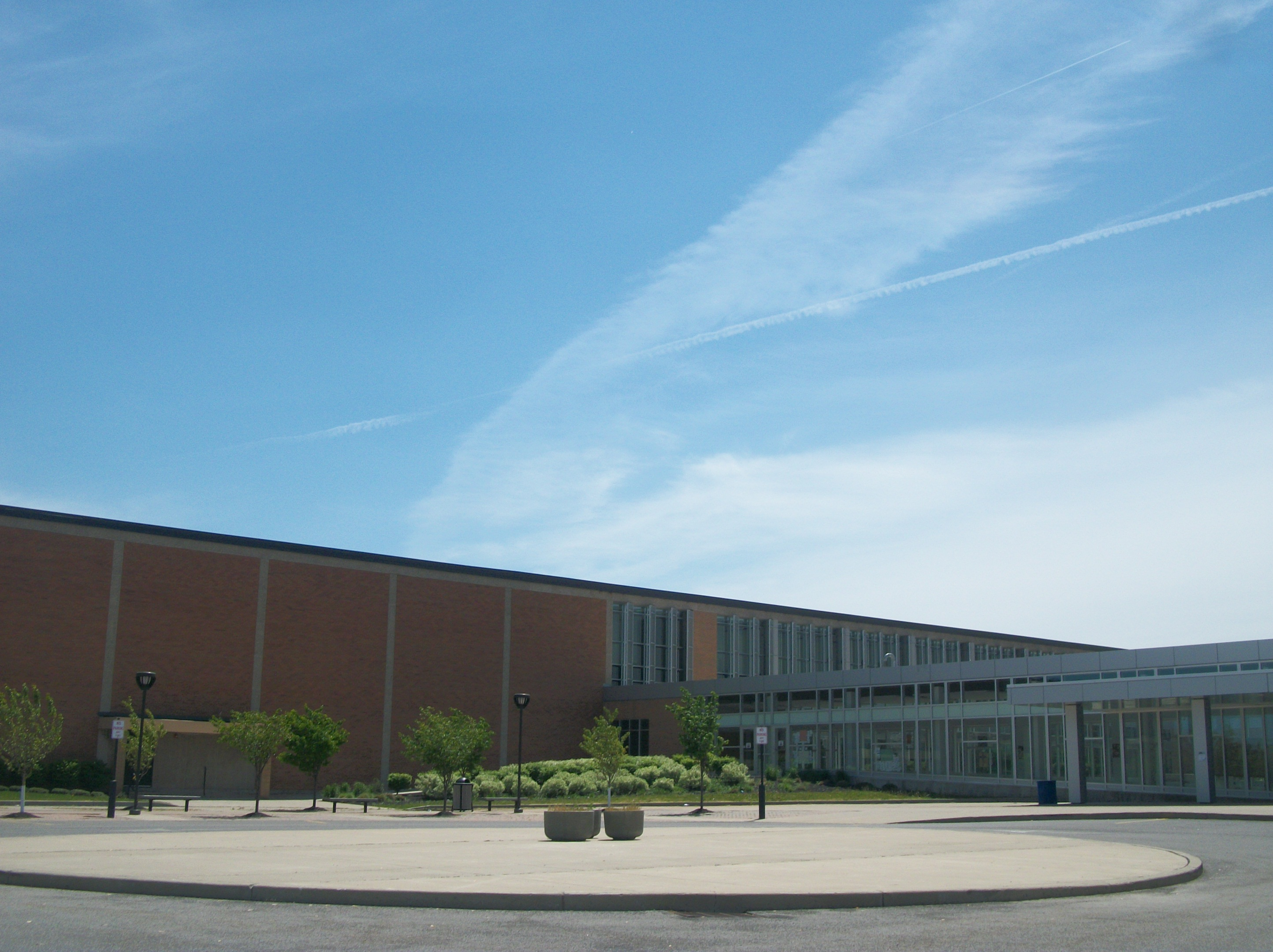

Location
- 2292 Saunders Settlement Road; Sanborn, Niagara, New York 14132

Information
- Principal: Marissa Vuich
- Grades: 9-12
- Website: Niagara Wheatfield High School

Niagara-Wheatfield High School is located at 2292 Saunders Settlement Road in Sanborn, New York and serves grades 9 through 12. The current interim principal is Jeffrey White.

==== History ====
Niagara Wheatfield High School opened on September 8, 1958, as Niagara Wheatfield Junior-Senior High School and was dedicated on April 12, 1959. A time capsule was buried on June 8, 1958.

=== Edward Town Middle School ===
Edward Town Middle School
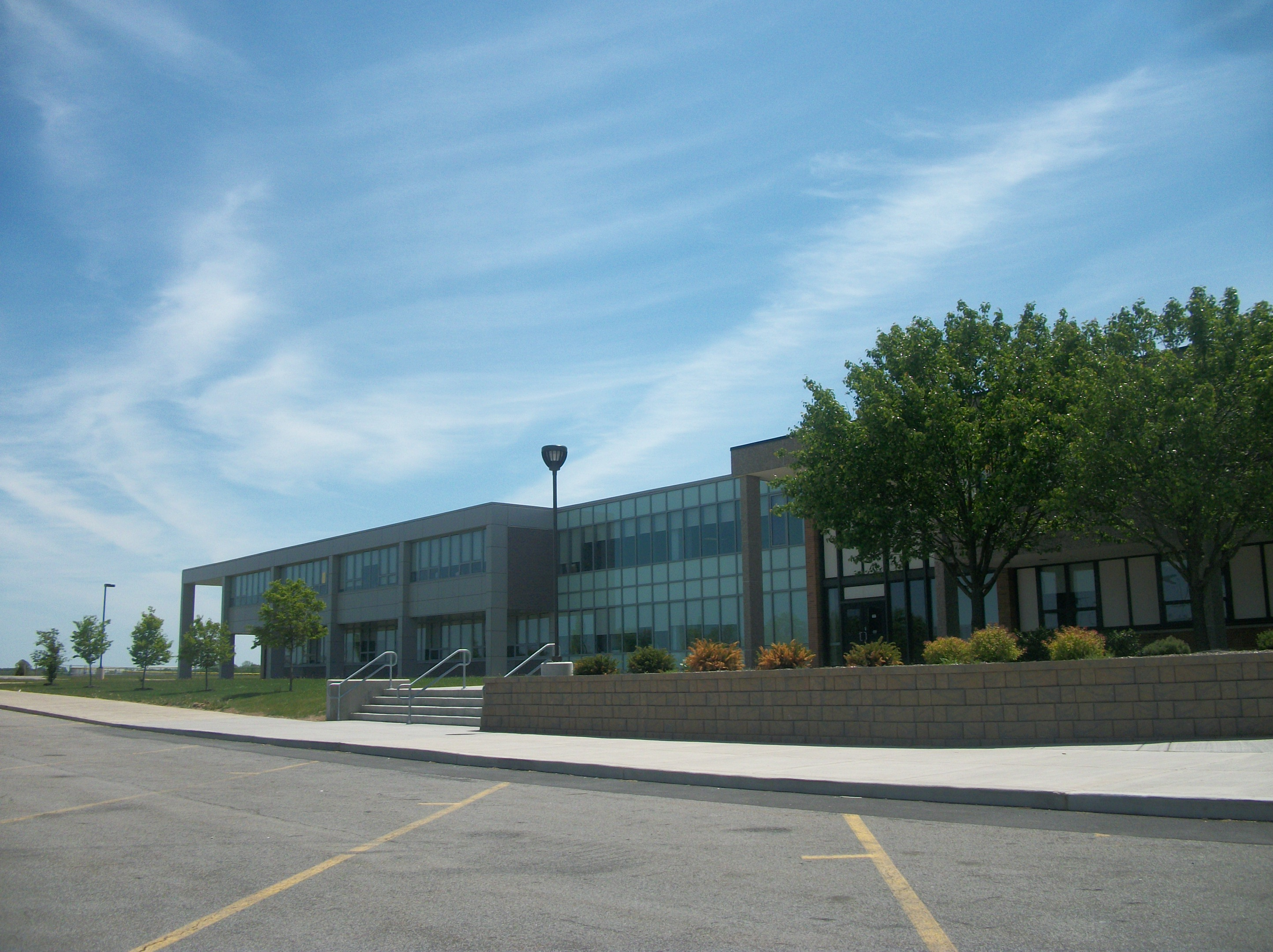

Location
- 2292 Saunders Settlement Road; Sanborn, Niagara, New York 14132; United States

Information
- Principal: Eleanor Payne
- Grades: 6-8
- Website: Edward Town Middle School

Edward Town Middle School is located at 2292 Sanders Settlement Road in Sanborn and serves grades 6, 7, and 8. The current principal is Eleanor Payne.

==== History ====
Edward Town Middle School opened on October 13, 1965, as Edward Town Junior High School and was dedicated on April 24, 1966.

=== Colonial Village Elementary School ===
Colonial Village Elementary School
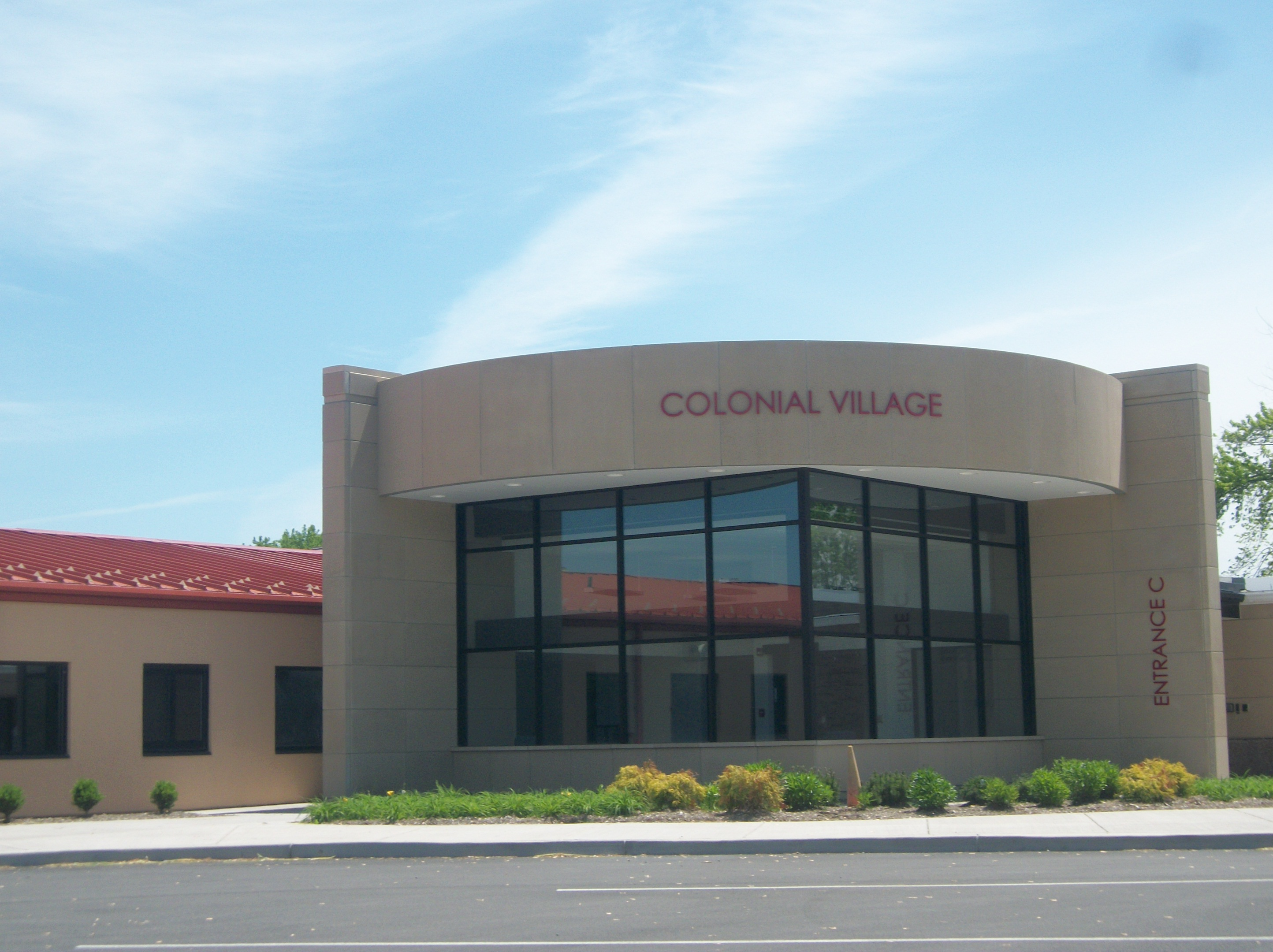

Location
- 1456 Saunders Settlement Road; Niagara Falls, Niagara, New York 14305; United States

Information
- Principal: Jeff Cacicia
- Grades: K-5
- Website: Colonial Village Elementary

Colonial Village Elementary School is located in Lewiston, and is located at 1456 Saunders Settlement Road. It serves grades K through 5. The current principal is Marissa Vuich.

=== Errick Road Elementary ===
Errick Road Elementary School
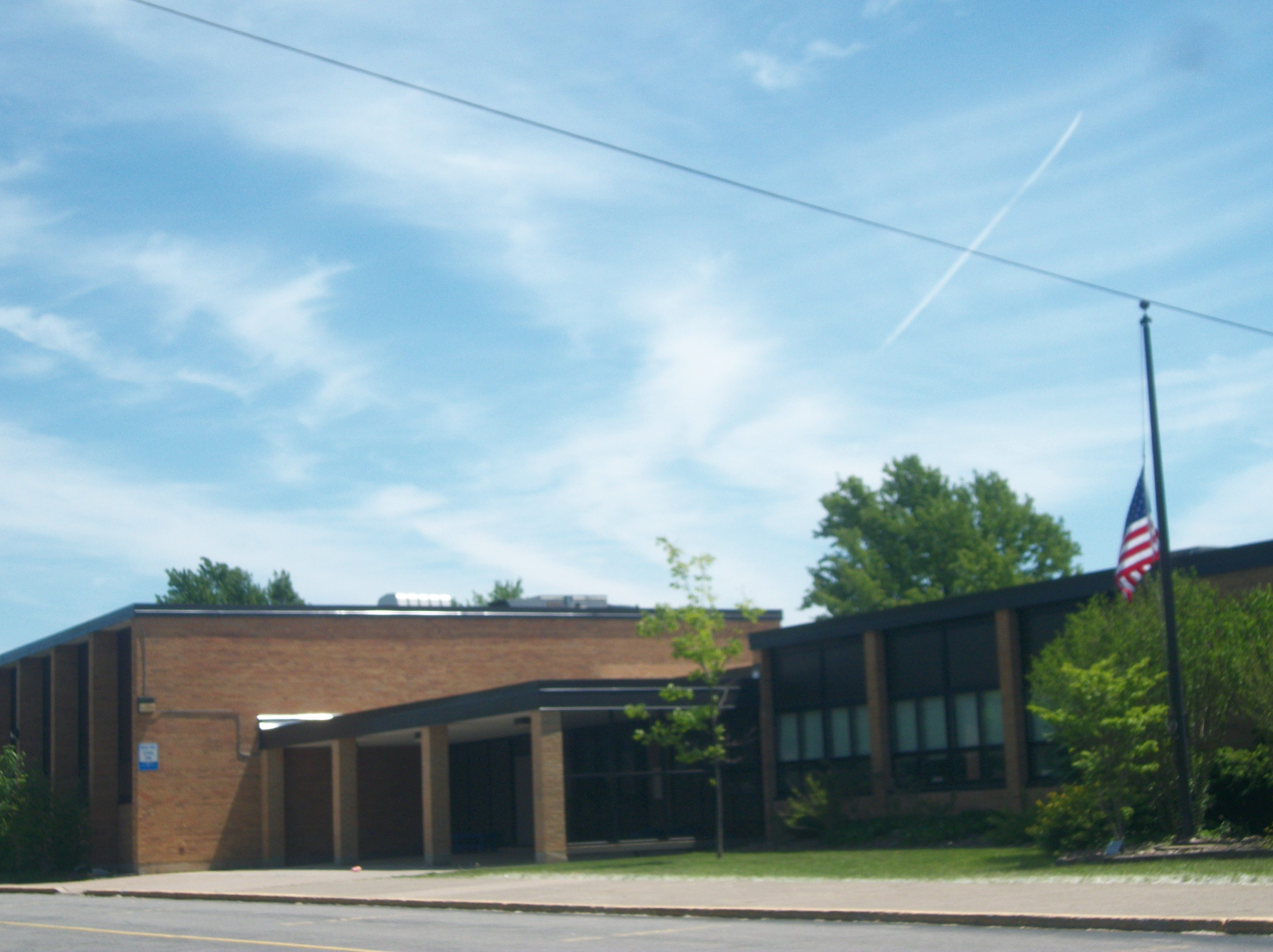

Location
- 6839 Errick Road; North Tonawanda, Niagara, New York 14120

Information
- Principal: Nora O'Bryan
- Grades: K-5
- Website: Errick Road Elementary School

Errick Road Elementary School is located at 6839 Errick Road in Wheatfield and serves grades K through 5. The current principal is Nora O'Bryan.

=== Tuscarora Nation School ===
Tuscaroa Nation School
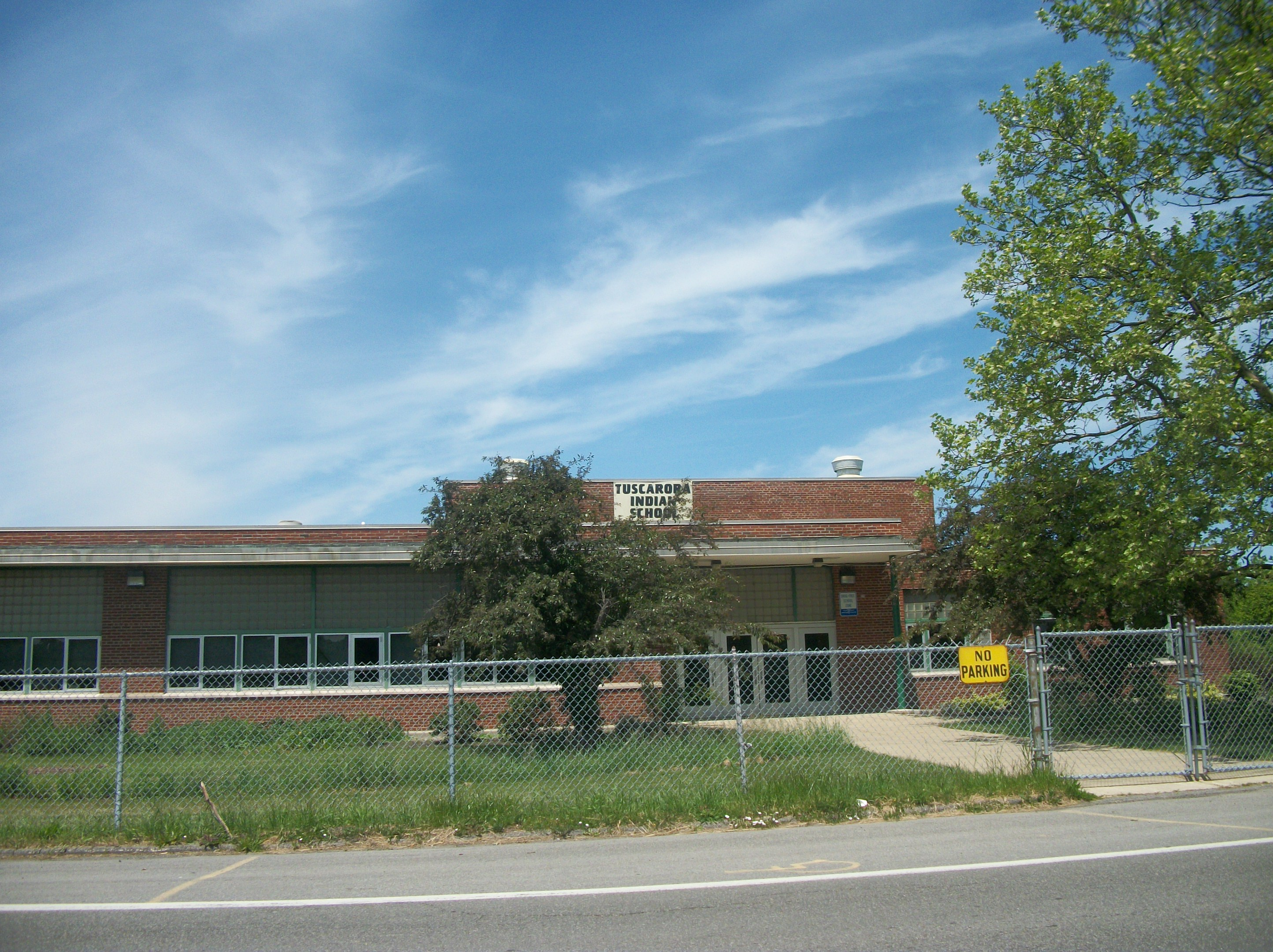

Location
- 2015 Mount Hope Road; Lewiston, Niagara, New York 14092; United States

Information
- Principal: Elizabeth Corieri
- Grades: K-6
- Website: Tuscarora Indian School

Tuscarora Nation School is located at 2015 Mt. Hope Street in Lewiston and serves grades K through 6. The current principal is Elizabeth Corieri.

=== West Street Elementary ===
West Street Elementary School
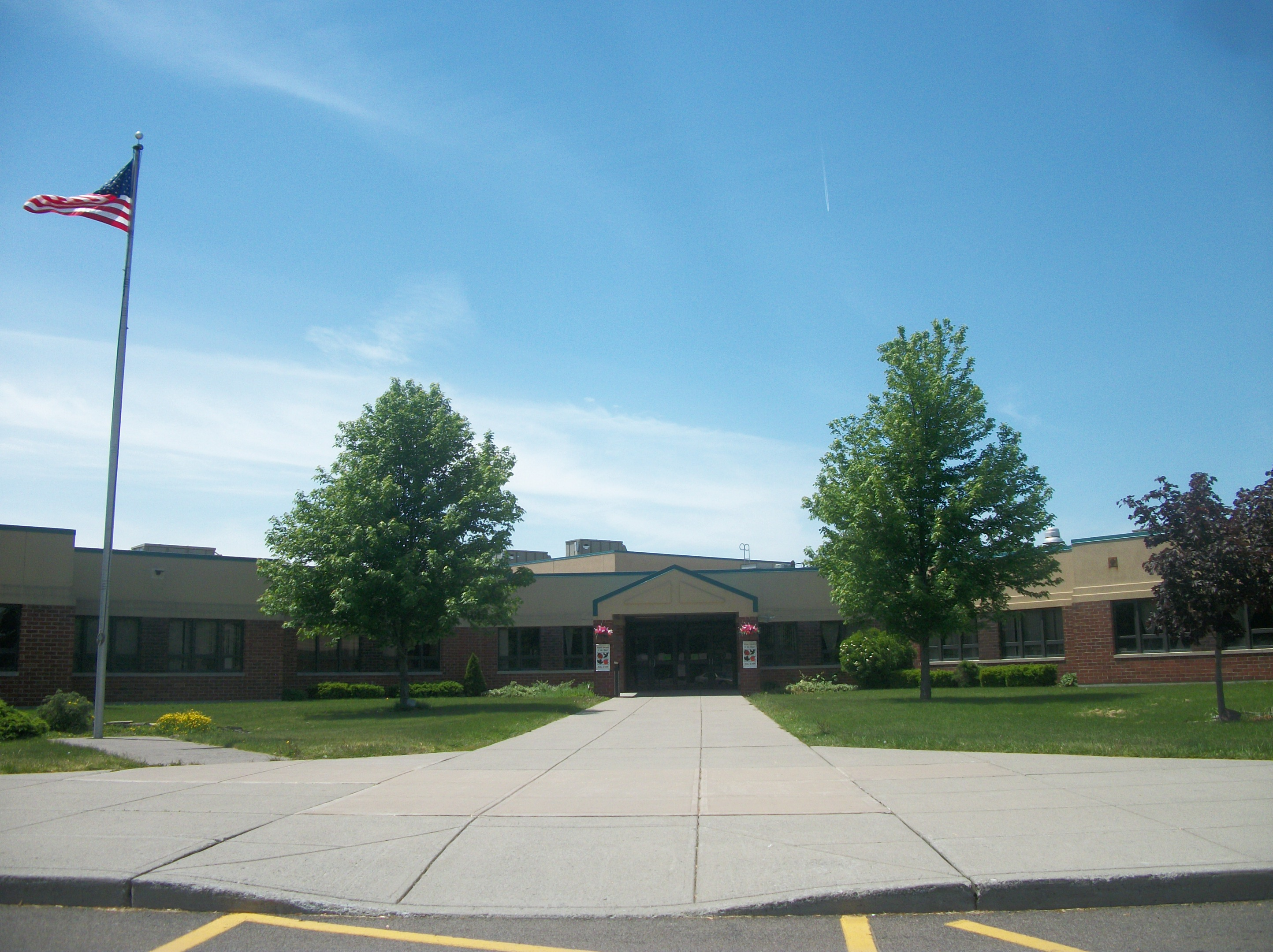

Location
- 5700 West Street; Sanborn, Niagara, New York 14132; United States

Information
- Principal: Theron Mong
- Grades: K-5
- Website: West Street School

West Street Elementary School is located at 5700 West Street in Sanborn and serves grades K through 5. The current principal is Theron Mong.

=== History ===
West Street Elementary School was built and opened on September 9, 1998.

== School colors and mascot ==
Niagara-Wheatfield Senior High School's official school colors are black, white, and red. The school's mascot is the Falcon, and its sports teams and other competitive teams are referred to as the "Niagara-Wheafield Falcons."

== Academic and behavioral statistics ==
Overall, Niagara-Wheatfield Central School District's academic and behavioral statistics are higher than the New York State average. In 2006, the average attendance rate for all high school students was 93%. Total suspension count for the year was 94 incidents. 96% of the Class of 2006 earned New York State Regents diplomas, while only 4% earned local diplomas. 56.8% of total students earned New York State Regents diplomas with advanced designations (honors). 69.2% of students with disabilities earned New York State Regents diplomas.

In 2022, the New York attorney general sued the school district for failing to protect their students from bullying and harassment, and the district won a decision at the trial court level. On appeal to the United States Court of Appeals for the Second Circuit, the school district lost in 2024. The appellate court held "that the State of New York had met its burden of pleading parens patriae standing at this stage of the litigation."

== Sports and academic organizations ==
NW has an array of sports programs, including baseball, football, basketball, bowling, wrestling, cheer-leading, track, cross country, tennis, volleyball, swimming, golf, soccer, hockey and softball. Niagara-Wheatfield competes in the NFL (Niagara Frontier League) with rival schools such as Lewiston-Porter, Niagara Falls, and Lockport. Niagara-Wheatfield is in New York's Section 6.

Niagara-Wheatfield also offers a wide variety of other organizations.

== Notable alumni ==
- Rashad Evans

== Post-high school career paths ==
The majority of each year's graduating classes go on to pursue two and four-year college-level degrees. 38.5% of students in the Class of 2006 went on to start a four-year degree program (91 students in-state and 4 out of state), 46% went on to start a two-year degree, 4.3% went on to start other vocational training programs, and 28 students total started employment immediately after graduation.

== 2008: 50 year golden anniversary ==
On April 24, 2008, Niagara-Wheatfield High School celebrated its "golden anniversary" of 50 years with a "Soda Shop Sock Hop with Big Wheelie and the Hubcaps and root beer floats", inviting all NW alumni who have graduated from the school since its opening 50 years previously.

== See also ==
- Goss v. Lopez
