= Chautauqua Hurricane =

Basketball team in Pennsylvania and New York, 2013–2022

- Founded: 2013; 13 years ago
- Folded: 2022; 4 years ago
- League: PBL; 2013–2017, 2022; NABL; 2018–2019
- Team history: Erie Hurricane; 2013–2015; Chautauqua Hurricane; 2015–2022
- Based in: Erie, Pennsylvania; 2013–2015; Dunkirk, New York; 2015–2022
- Arena: East High School; 2013–2015; Dunkirk High School; 2015–2022
- Colors: Violet, black, white
- Owner: Tawan Slaughter; 2013–2016; Sixto Rosario; 2016–2022
- Head coach: Cory Coleman; 2013–2014; Steve Mackey; 2014–2015; 2021–2022; Jerome Moss; 2015–2020
- Championships: 1 (2020)
- Playoff berths: 2 (2019, 2021)

The Chautauqua Hurricane were a basketball team in both the Premier Basketball League (PBL) and North American Basketball League (NABL). The team originally was based in Erie, Pennsylvania and competed as the Erie Hurricane before relocating to Dunkirk, New York in 2015.

After their 2019–20 season ended prematurely due to the COVID-19 pandemic, the team was declared PBL Champions.

The franchise suspended operations following the 2021–22 PBL season.

== History ==
=== 2013–2015: Erie Hurricane ===
The Erie Hurricane were founded in 2013 by Buffalo 716ers owner Tawan Slaughter as a member of the Premiere Basketball League (PBL). They played their games at East High School in Erie, Pennsylvania.

In the team's second season, Slaughter began staging games in Jamestown, New York to test waters for a permanent move.

=== 2015–2022: Chautauqua Hurricane ===
Following the 2014–15 PBL season, Tawan Slaughter announced the team would be renamed to Jamestown Hurricane. This was short-lived, however, and the team began the 2015–16 PBL season as the Chautauqua Hurricane out of nearby Dunkirk, New York.

Tawan Slaughter sold the team to Sixto Rosario following the 2015–16 PBL season. After the PBL's closure, Rosario moved the team to the North American Basketball League (NABL) in 2018.

The Hurricane announced in December 2019 that the team would return to a revived Premier Basketball League for the 2019–20 PBL season.

After the 2019–20 PBL season ended early due to the COVID-19 pandemic, the Hurricane were declared PBL Champions as they were in first-place with an 11–3 record. Kofi Mills was honored as League MVP and Jerome Moss was honored as PBL Coach of the Year following the truncated season.

While a full 2020–21 PBL season was not held due to the ongoing pandemic, the team qualified for the 2021 PBL Championship Series tournament with a 3–2 record and was eliminated by the Lancaster Thunder.

The Hurricane played their final 2021–22 season in the PBL before folding.

== Season-by-season record ==
League champions	Conference champions	Division champions	Playoff berth

Season	Conference	Finish	Division	Finish	Wins	Losses	Win%	GB	Playoffs	Awards	Head coach	Ref.
2013–14	—	—	East	5th	1	15	.063	—	Did not qualify.		Cory Coleman	
2014–15	—	—	East	4th	3	10	.231	—	Did not qualify.	Troy Jackson (All-PBL)	Steve Mackey	
2015–16	—	—	Northeast	6th	3	12	.200	—	Did not qualify.		Jerome Moss	
2016–17	—	—	—	—	6	13	.316	—	Did not qualify.	Edwin Ubiles (All-PBL); Tyquan Stroman (All-PBL)	Jerome Moss	
2017–18	—	—	Northeast	2nd	4	2	.667	—	Did not qualify.		Jerome Moss	
2018–19	—	—	Northeast	2nd	4	4	.500	—	Won quarterfinal (Dream) 108–62; Lost semifinal (Thunder) 110–116		Jerome Moss	
2019–20	—	—	Northeast	1st	11	3	.786	—	No playoffs held. Won PBL Championship	Kofi Mills (League MVP); Jerome Moss (Coach of the Year)	Jerome Moss	
2020–21	—	—	—	—	3	2	.600	—	Lost semifinal (Thunder) 87–100	Alex Crossan (All-PBL); Larry Rivers (All-PBL); Travonta Gatewood (All-PBL)	Steve Mackey	
2021–22	—	—	East	3rd	2	6	.250	—	Did not qualify.	Joe Spencer (All-Star); Larry Rivers (All-Star); Marcus Feagin (All-Star)	Steve Mackey	
