= Premier Basketball League playoff results =

These are playoff results for the Premier Basketball League (PBL).

== 2008 ==
First Round; Tuesday, March 18; Attack Athletics, Chicago	Division Semifinals; Wednesday, March 19; Attack Athletics, Chicago
2	Wilmington	112
5	Maryland	125
5	Maryland	96
Eastern Division
3	Reading	105
3	Reading	135
4	Jacksonville	119
2	Arkansas	115
5	Chicago	102
2	Arkansas	112
3	Rockford	108
3	Rockford	121
4	Dallas	108
Western Division

Division Finals; Thursday, March 20; Blue Cross Arena, Rochester and Black Hawk College, Moline
1	Rochester	100
3	Reading	76
1	Quad City	93
2	Arkansas	102

PBL Championship Game; Sunday, March 30; Blue Cross Arena, Rochester
E1	Rochester	142
W2	Arkansas	112

== 2009 ==
=== Bracket ===
Play-in game
4	Wilmington Sea Dawgs	96
5	Vermont Frost Heaves	90

PBL Semifinals (best-of-3)
1	Battle Creek Knights	2 games
4	Wilmington Sea Dawgs	1 game
2	Rochester Razorsharks	2 games
3	Manchester Millrats	1 game

PBL Finals *
1	Battle Creek Knights	115
2	Rochester Razorsharks	152

=== Individual game results ===
==== Play-in game: #5 Vermont Frost Heaves vs. #4 Wilmington Sea Dawgs ====
Wilmington 96, Vermont 90: April 1, Schwartz Center, Wilmington, North Carolina

==== Best-of-3 Semifinals ====
===== #4 Wilmington Sea Dawgs vs. #1 Battle Creek Knights =====
Game 1: Wilmington 112, Battle Creek 108: April 3, Schwartz Center, Wilmington, North Carolina
Game 2: Battle Creek 111, Wilmington 90: April 5, Kellogg Arena, Battle Creek, Michigan
Game 3: Battle Creek 119, Wilmington 112: April 6, Kellogg Arena, Battle Creek, Michigan

===== #3 Manchester Millrats vs. #2 Rochester Razorsharks =====
Game 1: Rochester 125, Manchester 110: April 2, Southern New Hampshire Fieldhouse, Manchester, New Hampshire
Game 2: Manchester 116, Rochester 110: April 5, Blue Cross Arena, Rochester, New York
Game 3: Rochester 110, Manchester 103: April 11, Blue Cross Arena, Rochester, New York

==== PBL Finals*: #2 Rochester Razorsharks vs. #1 Battle Creek Knights ====
Rochester 152, Battle Creek 115: April 19, Blue Cross Arena, Rochester, New York

* Instead of a planned 3-game series with home court advantage going to the Battle Creek Knights, the league changed the format to a single game series.

== 2010 ==
=== Bracket ===
PBL Semifinals
1	Lawton-Fort Sill Cavalry	2 games
4	Halifax Rainmen	0 games
2	Rochester Razorsharks	2 games
3	Puerto Rico Capitanes	0 games

PBL Finals
1	Lawton-Fort Sill Cavalry	2 games
2	Rochester Razorsharks	1 game

=== Individual game results ===
==== PBL Semifinals ====
===== #4 Halifax Rainmen vs. #1 Lawton-Fort Sill Cavalry =====
Game 1: Lawton-Fort Sill 108, Halifax 104: April 15, Halifax Metro Centre, Halifax, Nova Scotia
Game 2: Lawton-Fort Sill 135, Halifax 104: April 18, Great Plains Coliseum, Lawton, Oklahoma

===== #3 Puerto Rico Capitanes vs. #2 Rochester Razorsharks =====
Game 1: Rochester 119, Puerto Rico 95: April 14, Manuel "Petaca" Iguina Coliseum, Arecibo, Puerto Rico
Game 2: Rochester 132, Puerto Rico 108: April 18, Blue Cross Arena, Rochester, New York

==== PBL Finals: #2 Rochester Razorsharks vs. #1 Lawton-Fort Sill Cavalry ====
Game 1: Rochester 110, Lawton-Fort Sill 106 (OT): April 22, Blue Cross Arena, Rochester, New York
Game 2: Lawton-Fort Sill 95, Rochester 84: April 25, Great Plains Coliseum, Lawton, Oklahoma
Game 3: Lawton-Fort Sill 124, Rochester 108: April 27, Great Plains Coliseum, Lawton, Oklahoma

== 2011 ==
=== Bracket ===
PBL Semifinals
1	Lawton-Fort Sill Cavalry	2 games
4	Halifax Rainmen	1 game
3	Rochester Razorsharks	2 games
2	Quebec Kebs	1 game

PBL Finals
1	Lawton-Fort Sill Cavalry	1 games
3	Rochester Razorsharks	2 games

== 2013 ==
=== Bracket ===
PBL Semifinals
1	Rochester Razorsharks	2 games
4	Sauk Valley Predators	0 games
2	Bloomington Flex	2 games
3	Indiana Diesels	0 games

PBL Finals
1	Rochester Razorsharks	0 games
2	Bloomington Flex	2 games
