= Malcolm Griffin (basketball) =

American basketball player (born 1991)

Free agent
- Position: Point guard / shooting guard

Personal information
- Born: August 10, 1991 (age 35) Chicago, Illinois
- Listed height: 6 ft 4 in (1.93 m)
- Listed weight: 210 lb (95 kg)

Career information
- High school: Hyde Park Career Academy (Chicago, Illinois)
- College: Toledo (2009–2011); Fresno Pacific (2012–2014)
- NBA draft: 2014: undrafted
- Playing career: 2014–present

Career history
- 2014–2015: Wydad Casablanca
- 2015: Champaign Swarm
- 2015–2016: FUS Rabat
- 2016: AS Salé
- 2016–2017: Liepājas Lauvas
- 2017–2018: Kolossos Rodou
- 2018: Zenit Saint Petersburg
- 2018–2019: AEK Athens
- 2019: Hapoel Jerusalem
- 2019: Hapoel Tel Aviv
- 2019–2020: Kolossos Rodou
- 2020–2022: PAOK Thessaloniki
- 2022: SLAC
- 2022: Dinamo București

Career highlights
- FIBA Intercontinental Cup champion (2019); Greek League steals leader (2021); Baltic League Defensive Player of the Year (2017); Latvian League assists leader (2017); Latvian League All-Star (2017); MPBA champion (2015); 2× First Team All-Pac West (2013, 2014)

Malcolm Xavier Griffin (born August 10, 1991) is an American professional basketball player. Standing at 1.93 m (6 ft 4 in), he plays at the point guard and shooting guard positions. After two years at Toledo and two years at Fresno Pacific he played professional basketball in Morocco, Tunisia, Latvia, Greece, Russia and Israel.

== High school career ==
Griffin played high school basketball at Hyde Park Career Academy at Chicago, Illinois. He led his team to a 27–5 mark as a senior and averaging 17 points, seven assists and five rebounds per game. Griffin also earned South MVP honors in the Chicago Classic All-Star Game, scoring 28 points in just 13 minutes of action.

== College career ==
After graduating from high school, Griffin attended Toledo, where he stayed until 2011. As a freshman, he averaged 7.1 points, 3.2 rebounds and 2.9 assists per game. As a sophomore, he started 28 games for the Rockets, averaging 12.0 points, 4.0 assists, 2.6 rebounds and 1.4 steals per game while scoring in double figures against two ranked opponents, Illinois and Temple. He scored a career-high 31 points against Northern Illinois and had back-to-back 25-point games against Ball State and Bowling Green. The next two years, Griffin played at Fresno Pacific. As a Junior, he played in 30 games, making 29 starts for the Sunbirds, earning 1st team NCCAA All-American and 1st team All-PacWest honors. He finished fourth in the league in scoring and led the PacWest in assists. As a senior he was a 1st team All-American and All-Conference once again, leading the Pacific West Conference in points, assists and steals.

== Professional career ==
After going undrafted in the 2014 NBA draft, Griffin joined Wydad Athletic Club Casablanca at Morocco. The same season, he also played for Champaign Swarm of the Midwest Professional Basketball Association. The following season, he returned to Morocco and played with Fath US de Rabat.

The next year, Griffin joined AS Salé at Tunisia. In December 2016, he left the team in order to join Liepājas Lauvas of the Latvian League. He led the Latvian league in assists, and was also named the Latvian Import Player of the Year, and Baltic League Defensive Player of the Year by the Eurobasket.com website.

On August 3, 2017, Griffin signed with Kolossos Rodou of the Greek Basket League. On October 16, 2017, he was voted as the Greek League MVP of the week after having 30 points and 4 assists against Panionios. The player also had 20 points in a near victory against former Greek League Champion Panathinaikos Superfoods. After leading the Greek League in scoring, and being third in assist and sixth in steals on January 22, 2018, Griffin was bought out from his Greek team by the VTB United League club Zenit Saint Petersburg of Russia. He signed a contract with Zenit for the rest of the 2017–18 season.

On July 17, 2018, Griffin returned to Greece and joined AEK Athens of the Greek Basket League. On December 11, 2018, Griffin recorded a season-high 25 points, shooting 11-of-14 from the field, along with seven rebounds and four assists in a 83–70 win over Hapoel Jerusalem. He was named Basketball Champions League Game Day 8 MVP. Griffin won the 2019 FIBA Intercontinental Cup with AEK.

On April 27, 2019, Griffin parted ways with AEK to join Hapoel Jerusalem of the Israeli Premier League for the rest of the season.

On August 1, 2019, Griffin signed a one-year deal with Hapoel Tel Aviv. On October 31, 2019, he parted ways with Hapoel after appearing in three league games.

On December 3, 2019, Griffin, in a surprise move, returned to Greece for Kolossos Rodou. On July 23, 2020, Griffin moved on to PAOK Thessaloniki, his third Greek club. On July 15, 2021, he officially renewed his contract with PAOK. On January 26, 2022, Griffin mutually parted ways with the club, after suffering a season-ending injury.

In May 2022, he joined SLAC from Guinea to play in the playoffs of the Basketball Africa League (BAL).

== Career statistics ==
Legend
GP	Games played	MPG	Minutes per game	FG%	Field goal percentage
3P%	3-point field goal percentage	FT%	Free throw percentage	RPG	Rebounds per game
APG	Assists per game	SPG	Steals per game	BPG	Blocks per game
PPG	Points per game	**Bold**	Career high		Led the league

=== Domestic Leagues ===
==== Regular season ====
Year	Team	League	GP	MPG	FG%	3P%	FT%	RPG	APG	SPG	BPG	PPG
2017–18	Kolossos Rodou	GBL	13	27.3	.506	.325	.813	3.8	5.0	1.5	0	15.9
2018–19	A.E.K.	GBL	25	20.4	.487	.313	.667	1.8	3.0	1.1	0	7.5

=== FIBA Champions League ===
Year	Team	GP	MPG	FG%	3P%	FT%	RPG	APG	SPG	BPG	PPG
2018–19	A.E.K.	18	22.8	.413	.288	.875	2.6	2.0	1.1	0	8.3
