= A. J. Guyton =

American basketball player and coach (born 1978)

Personal information
- Born: February 12, 1978 (age 48) Peoria, Illinois, U.S.
- Listed height: 6 ft 1 in (1.85 m)
- Listed weight: 180 lb (82 kg)

Career information
- High school: Central (Peoria, Illinois)
- College: Indiana (1996–2000)
- NBA draft: 2000: 2nd round, 32nd overall pick
- Drafted by: Chicago Bulls
- Playing career: 2000–2010
- Position: Shooting guard / point guard
- Number: 11

Career history

Playing
- 2000–2002: Chicago Bulls
- 2002: Golden State Warriors
- 2002–2003: Huntsville Flight
- 2003: Fortitudo Bologna
- 2003–2004: Hapoel Tel Aviv
- 2004: Fortitudo Bologna
- 2004–2005: Virtus Bologna
- 2005–2006: Viola Reggio Calabria
- 2007: Cedevita Zagreb
- 2008: Olimpia Larissa
- 2008: Sundsvall Dragons
- 2010: Al Rayyan Club

Coaching
- 2010–2012: Illinois Central College (assistant)
- 2012–2015: Central Illinois Drive / Bloomington Flex
- 2016–2017: Windy City Bulls (assistant)
- 2017–2018: Northwestern (dir. of player development)
- 2018–2019: Loyola (Maryland) (assistant)

Career highlights
- As player: Consensus first-team All-American (2000); Big Ten Player of the Year (2000); Big Ten Freshman of the Year (1997); As coach: 3× PBL champion (2012–2014); 2× PBL coach of the year (2012, 2013)
- Stats at NBA.com
- Stats at Basketball Reference
Medals
Men's basketball
Representing United States
Goodwill Games
Gold medal – first place	1998 New York	Team competition

Arthur James Guyton (born February 12, 1978) is an American former professional basketball player and now basketball coach. He played college basketball for the Indiana Hoosiers.

== Indiana University ==
Guyton chose to play basketball at Indiana University Bloomington under coach Bob Knight during 1996. His 283 three-pointers were the most for Indiana when his playing career ended in 2000. Guyton also had 2,100 points with the team. In 2000, he was named Big Ten Co-MVP and that same year was selected to the first team 2000 All-American Team. His senior year was a successful one in which he averaged 19.7 points per game.

Guyton later recalled, "I remember it all like it was yesterday. Those are nights you live for. I felt back then I couldn't be guarded." On June 10, 2014, Guyton learned that he was being inducted into the Indiana University Basketball Hall of Fame.

== Professional career ==
Guyton was selected by the Chicago Bulls in the second round (32nd overall pick) in the 2000 NBA draft. He played for the Bulls from 2000 to 2002 and briefly for the Golden State Warriors during the 2002–03 season. During his career in the NBA, he played in 80 games and averaged 5.5 points, 1 rebound and 1.8 assists. His final NBA game was played on November 20, 2002, in a 100–94 win over the Chicago Bulls where he only played for 30 seconds and recorded no stats. He later played in the NBDL, Italy, Israel, Croatia, and Sweden.

== Post-player career ==
In 2010 Guyton was an assistant coach at Illinois Central College. He was also head coach of the Bloomington Flex, a minor league team located in the Bloomington, Illinois area. Guyton led the Flex, then known as the Central Illinois Drive, to a 22–1 record in 2012 and a Premier Basketball League championship. Guyton also led the Flex to a PBL title in 2013, winning Coach of the Year honors both seasons. In 2014, the Flex were again the top team in the PBL under Guyton's leadership, finishing the season with a perfect 18–0 record.

In 2015, Guyton was appointed Consulting Director with the Midwest Professional Basketball Association.

On September 30, 2016, Guyton was appointed an assistant coach of the Windy City Bulls, a new NBA Development League franchise.

In September 2017, Guyton was named the director of player development for the Northwestern Wildcats men's basketball.

In June 2018, Guyton was named an assistant coach for the Loyola Greyhounds men's basketball team.
