= Maximum Basketball League =

American men's basketball league

- Formerly: Midwest Basketball League (2015-19)
- Sport: Basketball
- Founded: 2015
- Founder: Michael A. Wright
- First season: 2015
- No. of teams: 45
- Country: United States
- Most recent champion: CHICAGO FURY (2023)
- Most titles: 2 (Cedar Valley CourtKings)
- Website: mblpro.com

The Maximum Basketball League (MBL) is a professional men's basketball league which operates in the United States.

== History ==
Established in 2015 by founder Michael A. Wright, the Midwest Basketball League (MBL) was rebranded the Maximum Basketball League following the 2019 season when Wright stepped away.

Eleven teams competed in the inaugural 2016 season. Regular season games began in April 2016 followed by a post-season in August 2016.

After five games the Chicago Clovers were removed from the league. Lincoln Lions, who were playing a limited schedule as a "branding" team, took the place of the Clovers. Northern Indiana Monarchs also were removed after playing seven games although they would return to the league as Indy Show.

New management took command after the 2019 season which was followed by 13 teams leaving MBL. For the 2020 season 34 new teams are scheduled to compete. Only the Indiana Dream and Naptown Pros (formerly the Indy Show) remain from the inaugural season.

=== Teams ===
MidWest Division	City	1st season
Brownstown Bears	South Bend, Indiana	2021
Chicago Fury	Chicago, Illinois	2016
Chicago Knights	Chicago, Illinois	2017
Chicago Legends	Chicago, Illinois	2017
Detroit Panthers	Redford, Michigan	2022
Elkhart Mavericks	Elkhart, Indiana	2020
Fort Wayne Visions	Fort Wayne, Indiana	2018
Foundation Bulldogs	Eagan, Minnesota	2019
Grand Rapids Fusion	Grand Rapids, Michigan	2019
Midwest Storm		
Michigan Avengers	St. Clair Shores, Michigan	2020
Wayne County Roadrunners		2018
Northeast Division	City	1st season
Bronx Holy Storm	Bronx, New York	2020
Brooklyn Sentinels	Brooklyn, New York	2021
Crotona Hawks	Bronx, New York	2021
Kitsap Admirals	Bremerton, Washington	2022
Montrose Veterans	Bronx, New York	2021
Mount Vernon Power	Mount Vernon, New York	2020
NYC Black Eagles	New York City, New York	2021
South Division	City	1st season
DFW Just Hoop	Fort Worth, Texas	2020
Fort Worth Wolves	Fort Worth, Texas	2018
Foundation Bulldogs	Dallas, Texas	2019
Hills have Eyez		2021
North Texas Prowlers	Argyle, Texas	2020
Texas Empire		2020
Texas Tsunami		2020
Ultra Instinct	Dallas, Texas	2021
Waco Terror	Waco, Texas	2018
Southeast Division	City	1st season
Atlanta Wildcats	Atlanta, Georgia	2020
Birmingham Outlaws	Birmingham, Alabama	2024
Wolverton Wolves	Roswell, Georgia	2023
Hub City Cyclones	Bartlett, Tennessee	2021
Memphis Lions	Memphis, Tennessee	2021
Music City Kings	Memphis, Tennessee	2020

=== Former teams ===
- Atlanta Grizzlies (2020)
- ArkLaTex Takeover (2020)
- Cincinnati Crush (2020)
- Charleston Panthers (2020)
- Dallas Kings (2018-2020)
- Dayton Eagles (2020)
- Delta Elite (2020)
- Derby City Flash (2020)
- DFW Kingsmen (2020)
- Fayetteville Flight (2020)
- Flower City Monarchs (2020)
- Fort Wayne Vision (2017-2020)
- Georgia Bombers (2020)
- Indiana Dream (2016-2020)
- Midwest Storm (2020)
- Kentucky Enforcers (2020)
- Kentucky Rebels (2020)
- Milwaukee Wizards (2020)
- Naptown Pros (2016-2020)
- Nationwide Hoops (2020)
- North Minneapolis Eagles (2017-2020)
- Oklahoma Tatanka (2020)
- Philadelphia Pioneers (2020)
- Questlife Warriors (2018-2020)
- Rockers International (2020)
- Savannah Cavaliers (2020)
- Southeast Shooters (2020)
- Team NetWork (2020)
- Texas Revelation (2018-2020)
- Arlington Dream Chasers (2018-2019)
- Bay Area Titans (2018-2019)
- Cedar Valley CourtKings (2016-2019)
- Central Indiana Crusaders (2016-2019)
- Chicago Clovers (2016) - removed from the league after five games
- Chicago Fury (2016-2019)
- Chicago Knights (2017-2019)
- Dallas Kings (2018-2020)
- Dayton Air Strikers (2016-2018)
- Game Solid (2020)
- Hamilton Heroes (2016)
- Illinois Bulldogs (2017)
- Indiana Fury (2016-2019)
- Iowa Elite Pro (2018-2019)
- Kentucky Flash (2016-2018)
- Lincoln Lions (2016-18)
- Milwaukee Wizards (2017) - returned in 2020
- Minnesota Arctic Blast (2017)
- Minnesota Broncos (2016-2019)
- Minnesota Lakers (2016-2019)
- Minnesota Pitbulls (2017)
- North Minneapolis Eagles (2017-2019) - returned in 2020
- Rochester Roadrunners (2017-2019)
- Springfield Panthers (2017-2019)
- TC Elite (2017-2019)
- Wisconsin Game Changers (2017)
- Wisconsin/Milwaukee Storm (2016-2017)
- Wolverton Wolves (2023)

== Champions ==
Season	Winner	Runner-up	Result
2016	Cedar Valley CourtKings	Minnesota Rangers	108-98
2017	Cedar Valley CourtKings	Fort Wayne Vision	121-106
2018	Twin Cities Elite	Fort Wayne Vision	106-104
2019	Fort Wayne Vision	Eagan Bulldogs	107-106
