= Sergio McClain =

American basketball player (born 1978)

Personal information
- Born: November 2, 1978 (age 48) Peoria, Illinois
- Listed height: 6 ft 4 in (1.93 m)
- Listed weight: 230 lb (104 kg)

Career information
- High school: Manual (Peoria, Illinois)
- College: Illinois (1997–2001)
- NBA draft: 2001: undrafted
- Playing career: 2001–2002
- Position: Shooting guard / small forward

Career history

Playing
- 2001–2002: Asheville Altitude

Coaching
- 2006–2007: Peoria Kings
- 2008–2009: Parkland College
- 2013: Springfield Xpress
- 2013–2014: Champaign Central HS (Asst.)
- 2014–2015: Champaign Central HS (interim HC)
- 2015–2016: Dade Christian School
- 2016–2018: Champaign Swarm
- 2019-Present: Saint Louis Public Schools (Middle School Athletic Director)

Career highlights
- Illinois Mr. Basketball (1997); 100 Legends of the IHSA Boys Basketball Tournament (2007); Greater Peoria Sports Hall of Fame (2013)

Sergio McClain (born November 2, 1978) is a former professional basketball player and NJCAA coach. He was the 1997 winner of the Illinois Mr. Basketball award.

== High school career ==
McClain attended Peoria Manual High School, and helped lead his basketball team to a record four consecutive state titles. He was a three time all-state selection, Conference Player of the Year in 1997, and was named 1997 Illinois Mr. Basketball. McClain was the only high school basketball player in Illinois state history to start on four straight state championship teams until Jabari Parker helped lead Simeon Career Academy in Chicago to four straight state titles.

== College career ==
McClain later played for Lon Kruger and Bill Self at the University of Illinois, along with his high school teammates Marcus Griffin and Frank Williams. "The Peoria 3" anchored one of the Big Ten's top teams during their time there and the Illini ultimately earned a number one seed in the 2001 NCAA Tournament, advancing to the Elite 8. His intimidating stature led Illini football coach Ron Turner to approach him about trying out for his team as a linebacker or safety, but after a few practices, McClain decided to focus on basketball.

== Coaching career ==
McClain was head for the now defunct Peoria Kings ABA franchise from 2006 to 2007. He later served as head coach at the NJCAA Division II level for Parkland College in Champaign, Illinois from 2008 to 2009. In his only season with Parkland, McClain went 14–15 with a seven-man roster. McClain returned to coaching in 2013, acting as head coach for the Springfield Express of the Independent Basketball Association. From 2013 to 2016 McClain coached at Champaign Central High School and at Dade Christian School until accepting the head coach position for the Champaign Swarm.

Awards and achievements
Preceded by Ronnie Fields	Illinois Mr. Basketball Award Winner; 1997	Succeeded by Frank Williams
