= Corey Allmond =

American basketball player

Personal information
- Born: January 20, 1988 (age 38) Oxon Hill, Maryland
- Listed height: 6 ft 2 in (1.88 m)
- Listed weight: 185 lb (84 kg)

Career information
- High school: Gwynn Park (Brandywine, Maryland)
- College: Howard College (2006–2008); Sam Houston State (2008–2010)
- NBA draft: 2010: undrafted
- Playing career: 2010–2020
- Position: Shooting guard

Career history
- 2010–2011: Fort Wayne Mad Ants
- 2011: ShenYang Dongjin
- 2011: Fort Wayne Mad Ants
- 2012: Vestelspor Manisa
- 2012–2013: AS Salé
- 2013–2014: Maine Red Claws
- 2014–2015: Rochester Razorsharks
- 2015–2016: Saint John Mill Rats
- 2016–2017: Rochester Razorsharks
- 2017–2020: Moncton Magic

Career highlights
- 2× First-team All-Southland (2009, 2010)

Corey Frederick Allmond (born January 20, 1988) is an American former professional basketball player who last played for Moncton Magic. Previously he played for the Rochester Razorsharks of the Premier Basketball League (PBL). He played college basketball for Howard College and Sam Houston State.

== High school career ==
Allmond attended Gwynn Park High School in Brandywine, Maryland and played basketball under head coach Steve Mathews. After a few seasons with the high school team, he was encouraged by his family and others to play for a prep school. Despite this, he said, "I didn't need four years [at a Division I school] to accomplish what I needed to accomplish. If I couldn't accomplish what I needed to in two years, then I shouldn't play in college." In 2006, averaged 26.1 points, 6.2 rebounds, and 5.3 assists en route to a county championship. The guard finished the season earning All-Metro and Gazette-Star All-County First Team honors.

== Collegiate career ==
Allmond started out playing college basketball on a scholarship at Howard College, a junior college located in Big Spring, Texas. His mother, Rosetta, supported the decision, even though it would cut down on his time with an NCAA Division I program. She later commented, "I thought that was a better deal for him to get a scholarship and for him to get a degree after two years, and if something came up where he could move on, then so be it." In both of his seasons with Howard, Corey was named All-Western Junior College Athletic Conference (WJCAC). As a sophomore, he lifted the Hawks to a 25–8 record. Allmond averaged 3.267 three-point field goals per game and recorded a total of 98 treys, ranking second in the NJCAA Division I. He shot .523 from the field and .462 on three-pointers under head coach Mark Adams. He reflected on his experience at the junior college, "The experience at Howard was great for me. Juco really helps get you ready for the next level. The coaching staff there really helped prepare me for life on and off of the court. I learned a lot there about basketball and in the classroom."

Allmond transferred to Sam Houston State of the NCAA Division I for his final two seasons at the collegiate level. He was approached by coaches from the school's basketball team in a game with Howard, but he felt sick and had what he called "the worst performance of his career." However, the Bearkats continued to show interest in him, saying that "the offer is still on the table." On November 14, 2008, Allmond made his NCAA debut, powering Sam Houston State to a 100–42 win over Schreiner University, who had a Division III basketball program. He scored 24 points with 8 three-pointers, tying Derick Preston in 1944 and Derrick Williams in 1988 for the most single-game treys in school history. Allmond was effective in his second appearance for Sam Houston State, notching 23 points against Texas Tech. He became only the fourth Bearkat to score 20 or more points in his first two games with the team. He had another notable performance on November 29, when he shot 8-of-12 for a total of 22 points in a victory over Wright State. On January 17, 2009, Allmond scored a career-high 25 points against Southeastern Louisiana, with 8 field goals and 4 three-pointers. The guard, whose team won by a 73–62 margin, scored 18 points in the first half itself. By the end of the season, Allmond was averaging 15.3 points, 2.7 assists, and 3.3 three-pointers per game. His scoring average was the highest for a Sam Houston State guard since Jeremy Burkhalter averaged 15.9 in 2000. Allmond was named to the National Association of Basketball Coaches (NABC) All-District Team with teammate Ashton Mitchell among others and also earned first-team All-Southland Conference honors. Following his junior year, Allmond led the Southland in three-pointers, with 99, and was one of the Division I's top long-range shooters.

Allmond started out his senior season with the Bearkats on November 14, 2009, with 15 points of 2-of-7 three-point shooting vs the Division III program from LeTourneau University. He said, "This game we wanted to work on getting the ball inside more, but we may have rushed some shots. I know I rushed a few." Despite this, Allmond led his team in scoring. On November 19, in what is sometimes considered Allmond's greatest performance, he scored 37 points in a road game against AP No. 4 Kentucky at Rupp Arena. He shot 11-of-16 from beyond the arc, the most three-pointers ever made at the arena and the most by a Southland or Sam Houston State player. Allmond said, "I knew I was going to get a lot of open looks because of the fast pace they play." The guard recorded 24 points in the first half alone, tying the opponent record of 8 threes at Rupp Arena, which was set by the Miami RedHawks' Nick Winbush three days prior. His shots included an off-balance three-pointer past John Wall and a corner trey over Patrick Patterson. However, the opposing Wildcats won the game, 102–92, behind 27 points and 18 rebounds from DeMarcus Cousins. The Bearkats toppled Auburn on December 20, as Allmond poured 25 points and 6 three-pointers. He also played a major role in Sam Houston State's 90–63 win over Lamar on January 27, 2010, scoring 24 points for his team, which was missing impact player Gilberto Clavell. Sam Houston State finished the season with a 25–8 overall record and went 14–2 in the conference. Strongly due to Allmond's scoring punch, the team ranked among the best in the Division I for assists. Head coach Bob Marlin praised him by saying, "It's amazing some of the shots he has made. We feel he is one of the best shooters in the country. His outside shooting also opens up a lot for us inside as well." He finished his senior year going .408 from beyond the arc, the second-highest three-point field goal percentage for a player in school history. He also finished fifth on the Bearkat's all-time three-pointer list, recording 270 in his two seasons playing Division I basketball. In addition, his 15.5 scoring average was the eight-highest for a Sam Houston State player.

== Professional career ==
Following his graduation from Sam Houston State, Allmond participated in pre-NBA draft workouts with the Houston Rockets and received a training camp invite from the San Antonio Spurs. On November 1, 2010, he was selected by the Fort Wayne Mad Ants with the 10th pick in the third round of the 2010 NBA Development League Draft. In 47 total games with Fort Wayne, Allmond finished the season averaging 7.7 points with a .412 field goal percentage in 18.3 minutes per game. He was also shooting .354 on three-pointers.

Allmond was acquired by ShenYang Dongjin of the National Basketball League in China later in 2011. He started in all 17 games and finished the year averaging 21.6 points, 3.8 rebounds, 3.2 assists, and 1.3 steals in 36.4 minutes per game. Allmond also shot .527 from the field and .397 on three-pointers. One of his most significant games was when he scored 33 points, including 7 three-pointers, in a loss to the Ningxia Hanas in late July 2011.

Allmond joined the Moncton Magic in 2017. During the 2019–20 season, he averaged 18 points, 3.2 rebounds, and 3.4 assists per game. Allmond was named to the Second Team All-NBL Canada.

== The Basketball Tournament ==
Corey Allmond played for DC On Point in the 2018 edition of The Basketball Tournament. He scored 8 points and had 3 rebounds in the team's first-round loss to Armored Athlete.
