= James Reaves =

Personal information
- Born: April 30, 1982 (age 44) Rochester, New York
- Listed height: 6 ft 8 in (2.03 m)
- Listed weight: 244.2 lb (111 kg)

Career information
- High school: Edison Tech (Rochester, New York)
- College: Niagara (2000–2004)
- Playing career: 2004–present

Career history
- 2004: BS Energy Braunschweig (Germany)
- 2005: SG FT/MTV Braunschweig (Germany)
- 2005: Tecos de la UAG (Mexico)
- 2005–2006: Rochester Razorsharks (ABA)
- 2006: Dodge City Legend (USBL)
- 2006–2007: Rochester Razorsharks (ABA)
- 2007–2008: UU-Korihait (Finland)
- 2008: Rochester Razorsharks (PBL)
- 2008–2009: Barreteros de Zacatecas (Mexico)
- 2009: Rochester Razorsharks (PBL)
- 2009: Bucaneros de La Guaira (Venezuela)
- 2009: Barreteros de Zacatecas (Mexico)
- 2010–2011: UU-Korihait (Finland)
- 2011–2012: Barreteros de Zacatecas (Mexico)
- 2012: UU-Korihait (Finland)
- 2013: Rochester Razorsharks (PBL)

Career highlights
- 3× ABA champion (2006, 2008, 2009); ABA All-Star (2007)

James Reaves is a former professional basketball player.

Reaves was born on April 30, 1982, in Rochester, New York, to Milton and Dorthea Reaves. He has two older brothers, Carlos and Kelvin. In 2006, Reaves was inducted to the Greater Rochester High School Basketball Hall of Fame.

== High school career ==
Reaves attended Edison Tech HS in Rochester. In 2000, his senior year, he averaged 25 points and 17 rebounds per game and was named All-Greater Rochester Area High School Boys Player of the Year.

== College career ==
Reaves attended Niagara University on a basketball scholarship. He was named to the MAAC All Rookie team in 2001 and All Conference team in 2002 and was the 2004 MAAC tournament MVP.

- 2000-2001: Freshman Year

Averaged 7.7 RPG

- 2001-2002: Sophomore Year

Averaged 10.4 PPG, 8.8 RPG and 1.1 APG

- 2002-2003: Junior Year

Averaged 11.7 PPG, 8.3 RPG and 2.3 APG

- 2003-2004: Senior Year

Averaged 11.6 PPG, 9.6 RPG and 1.5 APG

== International professional career ==
- 2004-2005

BS/Energy Braunschweig (Germany Div. I) & SG FT/MTV Braunschweig (Germany Div. II) Averaged 22.6 PPG and 9.4 RPG over 17 games for both teams

- 2005

Tecos del UAG (Liga Nacional de Baloncesto Profesional) Averaged 13.2 PPG and 7.3 RPG

In 2010-11 he played for Korihait in the Finnish basketball league, Korisliiga.

== United States professional career ==
- 2005-2006 (ABA)

Led Rochester Razorsharks in PPG with 18.4 and RPG with 7.6 and led team to first ever ABA Championship.

- 2006 Summer (USBL)

Played 11 games with the Dodge City Legend in USBL, averaging 10.6 PPG and 10.6 RPG. Sat out most of the year with an injured knee

- 2006-2007

Again played for hometown Rochester Razorsharks. For this season, Reaves was named to represent the Razorsharks in the 2007 ABA All-Star Game.
