= Barton Coliseum =

Multi-purpose arena in Little Rock, Arkansas

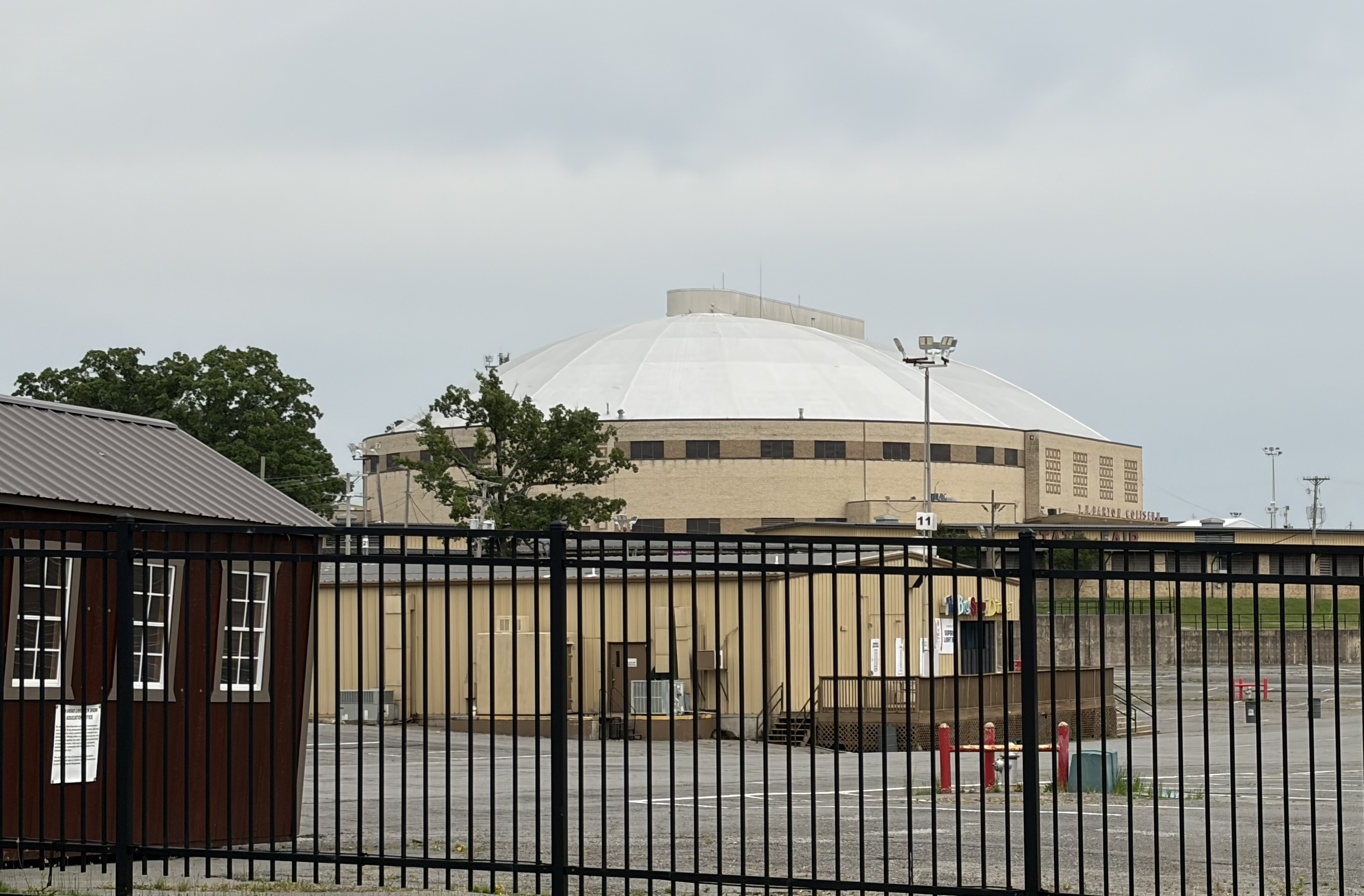
- Interactive map of Barton Coliseum
- Address: 2600 Howard Street
- Location: Little Rock, Arkansas, U.S.
- Coordinates: 34°43′18″N 92°17′57″W
- Owner: City of Little Rock
- Operator: Arkansas Livestock Show Association
- Capacity: 7,150

Construction
- Groundbreaking: 1947
- Opened: September 29, 1952
- Cost: US$1 million ($12.1 million in 2025 dollars)
- Architect: Erhart, Eichenbaum & Rauch
- Structural engineers: Erhart, Eichenbaum & Rauch
- General contractor: Baldwin Construction Company

Tenants
- Arkansas-Little Rock Trojans men's basketball (NCAA) (1952–1999); Arkansas-Little Rock Trojans women's basketball (NCAA) (1978–1999); Arkansas GlacierCats (WPHL) (1998–2000); Arkansas Impact (PBL) (2008); Arkansas Diamonds (IFL) (2027–present)

Website
- www.arkansasstatefair.com/barton-coliseum

Barton Coliseum is a 7,150-seat multi-purpose arena located within the Arkansas State Fairgrounds in Little Rock, Arkansas. The coliseum was dedicated on September 29, 1952, in honor of Thomas Harry Barton, founder of Lion Oil.

It is the former home of the Arkansas–Little Rock Trojans basketball team, the defunct Arkansas GlacierCats of the WPHL (now defunct) and the defunct Arkansas Impact of the PBL.

The Trojans moved into Alltel Arena, when it opened in 1999 and remained there, until the team moved into the Jack Stephens Center in 2005, which is located on the UALR campus. Prior to the Trojans' move to the Sun Belt Conference, the venue hosted five Trans America Athletic Conference (TAAC) men's basketball tournaments in 1983, 1986, 1987, 1989 and 1990. It has also hosted three Sun Belt Conference men's basketball tournaments.

The Arkansas Razorbacks men's basketball team would play one or two early season games every year in Barton, but they moved their central Arkansas games to Alltel after it opened.

During the annual Arkansas State Fair, the coliseum is the venue for the fair's rodeo events. Additionally, it is used as the location throughout the year for spectator events featuring monster trucks, motorcycle acrobatics, and other shows.

Countless rock concerts were held here until the completion of Alltel Arena. This fan-friendly site sold general admission tickets so that hardcore fans arriving hours before the doors opened could just about guarantee themselves a spot on the barrier. The entire floor of the coliseum was standing room only. Tailgating in the parking lot before the shows made these rock concerts all day parties.

Van Halen, Iron Maiden, Aerosmith, Leon Russell, Johnny Cash, Hank Williams Jr., The Allman Brothers Band, Fleetwood Mac, Bon Jovi, Pearl Jam, Nine Inch Nails, Mötley Crüe, Pat Benatar, ZZ Top, The Rolling Stones, and Lynyrd Skynyrd are just some of the musical acts that played at Barton over the years.

On April 17, 1972, Elvis Presley played Barton Coliseum to 10,000 fans and a complete sell out. Elvis wore the “Burning Love” suit. Elvis's suits were not named by him, but mostly posthumously by his legions of fans.

On December 2, 1972, it played host to The Jackson 5 concert tour, featuring Michael Jackson.

In 1978, Blue Öyster Cult made a live recording of "(Don't Fear) The Reaper", which was later used on their live album, Some Enchanted Evening.

On October 29, 2012, Rob Zombie along with Marilyn Manson played at Barton Coliseum in support of their Twins of Evil 2012 tour.

The Arkansas high school boys and girls basketball state finals were held here in 2013.

The annual Arkansas Big Buck Classic is held at the state fairgrounds every January, and Barton is utilized for the 3-day event.

== See also ==
- Jack Stephens Center
- War Memorial Stadium
