= Adrian Moten =

American gridiron football player (born 1988)

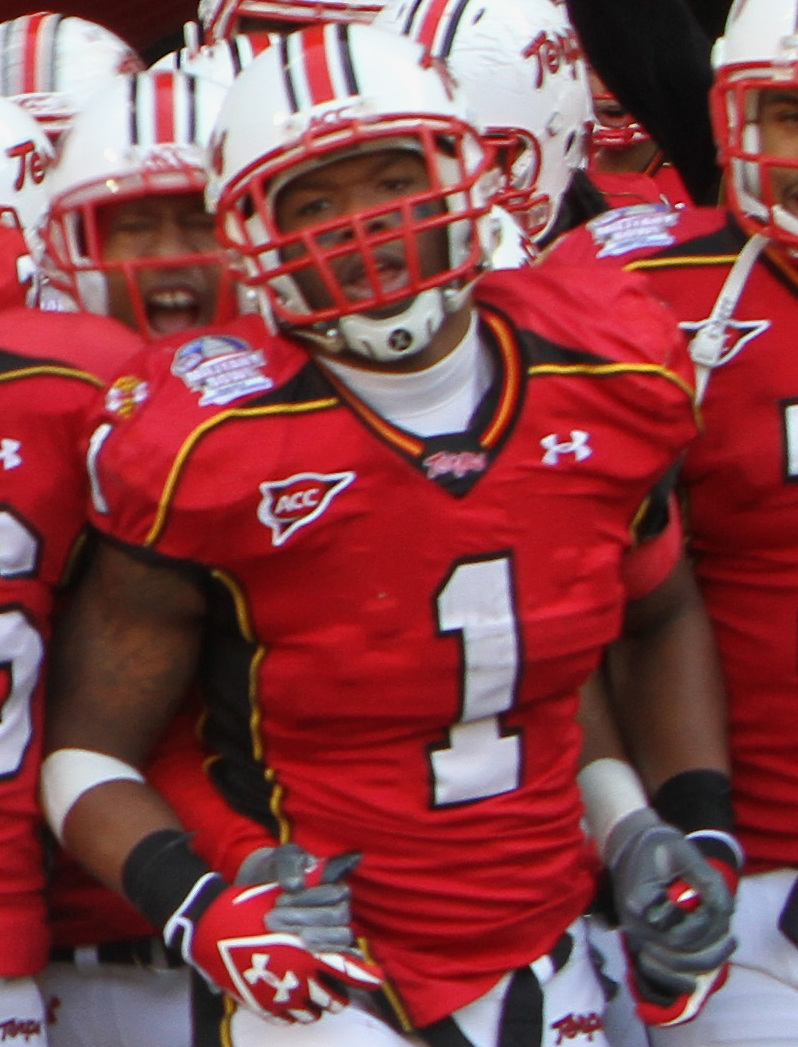
- Moten with Maryland at the 2010 Military Bowl

No. 57, 59, 54, 48
- Position: Linebacker

Personal information
- Born: April 22, 1988 (age 38); Suitland, Maryland, U.S.
- Listed height: 6 ft 2 in (1.88 m)
- Listed weight: 230 lb (104 kg)

Career information
- High school: Gwynn Park (Brandywine, Maryland)
- College: Maryland
- NFL draft: 2011: undrafted

Career history
- Indianapolis Colts (2011); Seattle Seahawks (2011); Philadelphia Eagles (2012); Cleveland Browns (2012); Detroit Lions (2013)*; Saskatchewan Roughriders (2014); Ottawa Redblacks (2014)*
- * Offseason or practice squad member only

Career NFL statistics
- Total tackles: 7
- Fumble recoveries: 1
- Stats at Pro Football Reference

Adrian Moten (born April 22, 1988) is an American former professional football player who was a linebacker in the National Football League (NFL). He was signed by the Indianapolis Colts as an undrafted free agent in 2011. He played college football for the Maryland Terrapins.

== Professional career ==
=== Indianapolis Colts ===
On July 29, 2011, Moten was signed by the Indianapolis Colts as an undrafted free agent. He was waived on November 26, 2011. He played in 10 games in the regular season and all 4 preseason games.

=== Seattle Seahawks ===
On November 28, 2011, Moten was claimed off waivers by the Seattle Seahawks. On May 15, 2012, he was released by the Seahawks. He played in 2 regular season games with the Seahawks.

=== Philadelphia Eagles ===
On August 6, 2012, Moten was signed by the Philadelphia Eagles. On August 31, 2012, Moten was released as one of the final cuts. On October 2, 2012, Moten was re-signed and then released on October 9, 2012. He played in 1 regular season game and all 4 preseason games with the Eagles.

=== Cleveland Browns ===
On December 18, 2012, Moten was signed by the Cleveland Browns. He was waived on August 3, 2013.

=== Detroit Lions ===
On August 5, 2013, Moten was claimed off waivers by the Detroit Lions. On August 17, 2013, he was released by the Lions. He played in 3 preseason games.

=== Saskatchewan Roughriders ===
Moten signed with the Saskatchewan Roughriders on May 16, 2014.

=== Ottawa Redblacks ===
Moten was signed to the Ottawa Redblacks' practice roster on August 26, 2014. He was released by the Redblacks on September 6, 2014.
