= North American Basketball League =

North American Basketball League (NABL)
- Founded: 2016
- Folded: 2021
- Motto: "It's about the game"
- No. of teams: 9
- Countries: United States
- Continent: FIBA Americas (Americas)
- Last champion: Georgia Kingz (2019)
- Most titles: 4 teams (1 title each)
- Website: www.nablbasketball.com

The North American Basketball League (NABL) was an American minor professional basketball league organization founded in 2016.

== History ==
Formed in 2016, the NABL began with 10 teams based in the South and Southwest regions of the United States. The first regular season games were played on April 30, 2016. Atlanta Show defeated Music City Kings in the first-ever league game 113-78. Atlanta Show would go undefeated on their way to capture the first league championship in August by defeating the Dallas Hoyas 145-110 in the championship game.

Season two saw expansion to a national level with 19 teams competing. Four teams from the Northwest were added including the Vancouver-based SB Battle. The San Antonio Lions became the second league champion by defeating the defending champ Atlanta Show 103-82 in the championship.

In the third season the league would again see 19 member teams, this time with a different footprint. Northwest division was eliminated and replaced by expansion in the Midwest with a six-team division and three teams in the Northeast. Dallas Mustangs (previously known as Dallas Hoyas) won the championship defeating Chautauqua Hurricane 112-105.

== Teams ==
Conference	Team	City	Arena	Joined
Southwest
Southwest	Metroplex Lightning	Fort Worth, TX		2019
Southwest	North Texas Saints	Fort Worth, TX		2019
Southwest	Oklahoma Outlaws	El Reno, OK		2018
Southwest	San Antonio Soldiers	San Antonio, TX		2019
Southeast	Georgia Kingz	Decatur, GA	N.H. Scott Recreation Center	2019
Southeast	Tennessee Stallions	Antioch, TN	Antioch Community Center	2019
Southeast	Tuscaloosa Titans	Tuscaloosa, AL	Belk Activity Center	2018
Midwest	Kentucky Enforcers	Florence, KY	Sports of All Sorts	2019
Midwest	West Michigan Lake Hawks	Muskegon, MI	Reeths-Puffer High School	2018

=== Former teams ===
- Alamo City Aztecs (2017)
- Atlanta Show (2016–2017)
- Austin Knights (2016)
- Buffalo Blue Hawks (2019)
- Capital Cardinals (2017)
- Charleston Panthers (2019)
- Chautauqua Hurricane (2018–2019)
- Dallas Diesel (2018)
- Dallas Mustangs (2016–2018)
- DFW United (2016–2017)
- DuBois Dream (2018–2019)
- Florida GymRats (2018)
- Grand Rapids Danger (2018–2019)
- Huntsville Force (2017)
- Indianapolis Diesels (2018)
- Jamestown Jackals (2018)
- Kitsap Admirals (2017)
- Kentucky Enforcers (2019)
- Lancaster Thunder (2019)
- Miss-Lou Warriors (2016–2018)
- Motor City Chargers (2018)
- Music City Kings (2016–2017, 2019)
- Ohio Bootleggers (2018)
- Panama City Piranhas (2017)
- Quad City Flames (2017)
- RDC Vulcans (2017)
- San Antonio Lions (2016–2018)
- Savannah Cavaliers (2016)
- SB Battle (2017)
- Shreveport-Bossier Flight (2016)
- Southern Illinois Pharaohs (2017–2018)
- Tacoma Thunder (2017)
- Tampa Bay Hawks (2018)
- Texas Toros (2018)
- Texas Wolverines (2017)
Current team locations:
Southwest Division
Southeast Division
Midwest Division

== Champions ==
Season	Champion	Runner-up	Result	Finals MVP
2016	Atlanta Show	Dallas Hoyas	145-110	Bernard Parks
2017	San Antonio Lions	Atlanta Show	103-82	Eric Nuncio
2018	Dallas Mustangs	Jamestown Jackals	112-105	D.K. Eldridge
2019	Georgia Kingz	Grand Rapids Danger	96-86	Bernard Parks

== Awards ==
Season	MVP	Newcomer	Coach	Community Award
2016	Bruce Barron, Dallas Hoyas	—	David Kesler, Atlanta Show	Music City Kings
2017	Bernard Parks, Atlanta Show	Lonnie Pearson, Kitsap Admirals	Justin Billings, Huntsville Force	Southern Illinois Pharaohs
2018	Bernard Parks, Tuscaloosa Titans	—	Paul C. Parker Jr., Dallas Mustangs	Grand Rapids Danger
2019	Cameron Mitchell, Kentucky Enforcers	Dorian Watson, Grand Rapids Danger	Dustin Driskell, Kentucky Enforcers	Lancaster Thunder
