= Kyle Arrington =

American football player (born 1986)

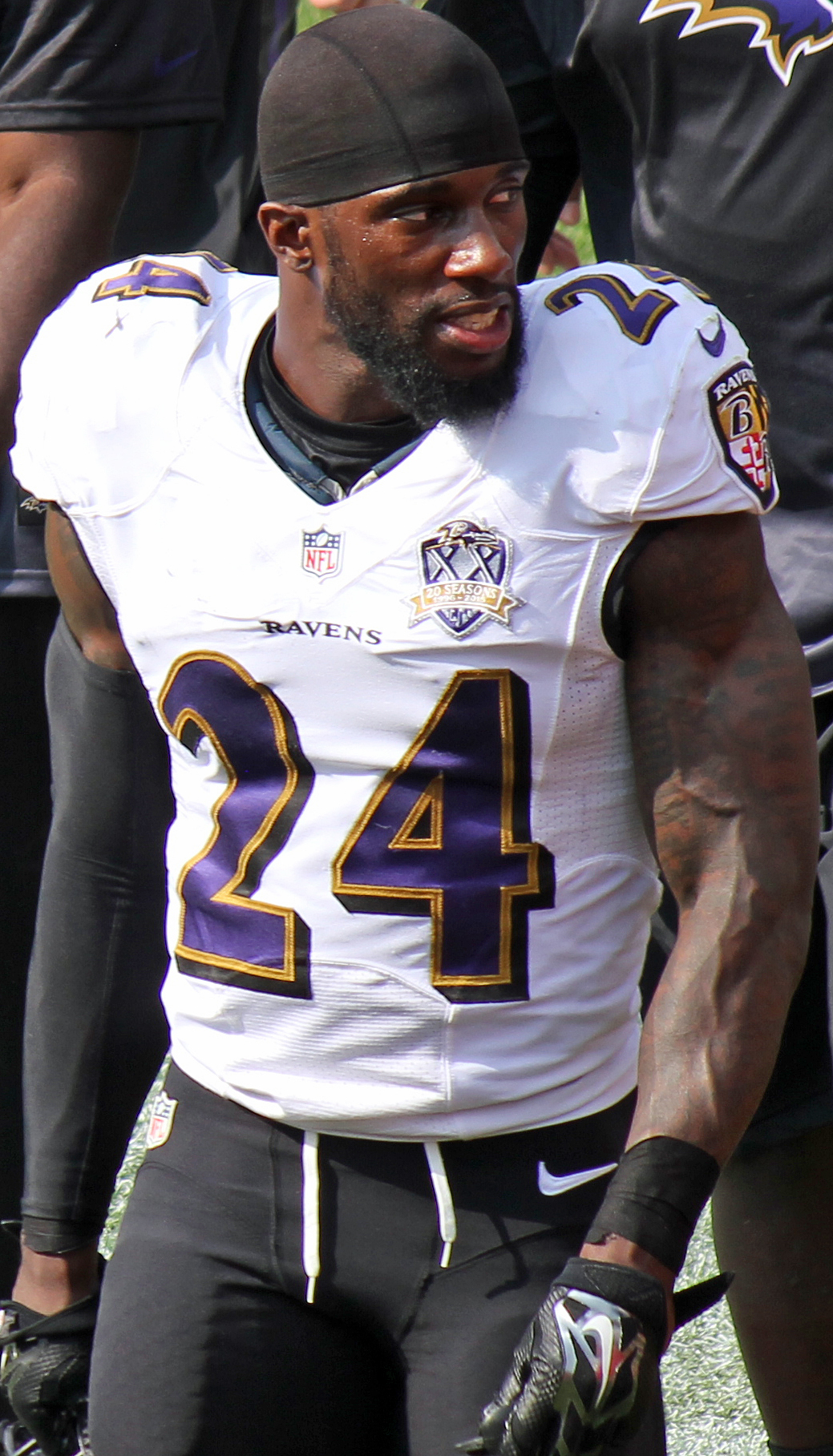
- Arrington with the Baltimore Ravens in 2015

No. 29, 27, 24, 25
- Position: Cornerback

Personal information
- Born: August 12, 1986 (age 40); Accokeek, Maryland, U.S.
- Listed height: 5 ft 10 in (1.78 m)
- Listed weight: 190 lb (86 kg)

Career information
- High school: Gwynn Park (Brandywine, Maryland)
- College: Hofstra
- NFL draft: 2008: undrafted

Career history
- Philadelphia Eagles (2008)*; Tampa Bay Buccaneers (2008–2009); New England Patriots (2009–2014); Baltimore Ravens (2015–2016)
- * Offseason or practice squad member only

Awards and highlights
- Super Bowl champion (XLIX); NFL Interceptions co-leader (2011)

Career NFL statistics
- Total tackles: 380
- Sacks: 3
- Forced fumbles: 6
- Fumble recoveries: 3
- Interceptions: 9
- Defensive touchdowns: 4
- Stats at Pro Football Reference

Kyle Chandler Arrington Sr. (born August 12, 1986) is an American former professional football player who was a cornerback in the National Football League (NFL). He played college football for the Hofstra Pride. Arrington was signed by the Philadelphia Eagles as an undrafted free agent in 2008. He was also a member of the Tampa Bay Buccaneers, New England Patriots and Baltimore Ravens. He played in two Super Bowls during his time with the Patriots, winning Super Bowl XLIX.

== Early life ==
Arrington was born in Accokeek, Maryland. He attended Gwynn Park High School in Prince George's County, Maryland, where he played football as a defensive back and kick returner, as well as basketball and track and field. He was a second-team all-county selection in football. He also played soccer in his years before college football.

== College career ==
After graduating from high school, Arrington attended Hofstra University beginning in 2004. During his time at Hofstra, Arrington was teammates with future NFL wide receiver Marques Colston. As a freshman, he played in seven games, recording three tackles. He started seven of the ten games he played as a sophomore, picking up 21 tackles and one forced fumble. In 2006, he played in 11 games, recording 69 tackles and an interception. In 2007, he played in 11 games again, recording 53 tackles and an interception. Arrington is one of Hofstra's last football players to make in to the NFL, as the school cut its program in 2009 due to costs and declining interest.

== Professional career ==
=== Philadelphia Eagles ===
Arrington went undrafted in the 2008 NFL draft. On April 28, 2008, the Philadelphia Eagles signed Arrington to a three-year, $1.16 million contract that includes a $10,000 signing bonus.

Throughout training camp, Arrington competed for a job as a backup cornerback and special teams player against Joselio Hanson, Nick Graham, and Therrian Fontenot. He played in all four preseason games and recorded 14 combined tackles (nine solo). On August 30, 2008, the Philadelphia Eagles waived Arrington. After clearing waivers he was re-signed to the Eagles' practice squad a day later. On September 10, 2008, the Philadelphia Eagles released Arrington.

=== Tampa Bay Buccaneers ===
On September 17, 2008, the Tampa Bay Buccaneers signed Arrington to their practice squad where he spent the remainder of the season.

On January 8, 2009, the Tampa Bay Buccaneers signed Arrington to a reserve futures contract. During training camp, Arrington competed for a job as a backup cornerback against Elbert Mack, Torrie Cox, and E. J. Biggers. On September 5, 2009, the Tampa Bay Buccaneers waived Arrington and signed him to their practice squad the following day. On September 11, 2009, the Tampa Bay Buccaneers promoted Arrington to the active roster. He was waived by the team the next day.

=== New England Patriots ===
On September 22, 2009, the New England Patriots signed Arrington to their practice squad. On November 8, 2009, the New England Patriots promoted him to their active roster after Cleveland Browns' head coach Eric Mangini made an attempt to sign Arrington to his roster.

In 2010, Arrington earned the starting cornerback job after Week 2, and kept that role for the rest of the season. He finished that year with one interception, which he returned 36 yards for a touchdown against the Packers. Arrington also scored on a return of a blocked field goal against the Dolphins in Week 4.

In 2011, he began the season as the nickel corner, since cornerback Leigh Bodden had returned from the injured reserve list, but regained the starting role early in the season. He led the NFL with seven interceptions for the 2011 season.

At the end of the 2011 season, Arrington and the Patriots appeared in Super Bowl XLVI. He started in the game, but the Patriots lost to the New York Giants by a score of 21–17.

In 2013, Arrington signed with the Patriots after agreeing in principle on a four-year deal.

In 2014, Arrington did not record an interception, but scored two touchdowns on special teams, returning a fumbled kickoff return nine yards against the Cincinnati Bengals in Week 5 and a blocked field goal 62 yards against the Miami Dolphins in Week 15. Arrington earned a Super Bowl ring as the Patriots defeated the Seattle Seahawks 28–24 in Super Bowl XLIX. During that game, Arrington was benched and replaced by eventual Super Bowl hero Malcolm Butler.

On May 11, 2015, Arrington was released by the Patriots.

=== Baltimore Ravens ===
On May 13, 2015, Arrington signed a three-year contract with the Baltimore Ravens. He played in 15 games with four starts in 2015, recording 28 tackles, three passes defensed and a forced fumble.

In 2016, Arrington suffered a concussion in the first preseason game and was placed on injured reserve on August 29, 2016, missing the entire season.

On June 5, 2017, Arrington was released by the Ravens after a failed physical.

== NFL career statistics ==
Legend
**Bold**	Career high

Year	Team	GP	Tackles				Fumbles			Interceptions					
Year	Team	GP	Cmb	Solo	Ast	Sck	FF	FR	Yds	Int	Yds	Avg	Lng	TD	PD
2009	TB	1	0	0	0	0.0	0	0	0	0	0	0.0	0	0	0
2009	NE	8	18	14	4	0.0	0	0	0	0	0	0.0	0	0	0
2010	NE	16	71	60	11	0.0	0	0	0	1	36	**36.0**	**36**	**1**	5
2011	NE	16	**88**	**66**	**22**	0.0	0	**1**	0	**7**	**92**	13.1	28	0	**15**
2012	NE	16	74	62	12	0.0	1	**1**	0	0	0	0.0	0	0	11
2013	NE	16	62	48	14	**2.0**	**2**	0	0	1	5	5.0	5	0	12
2014	NE	16	39	33	6	1.0	**2**	0	0	0	0	0.0	0	0	4
2015	BAL	15	28	22	6	0.0	1	0	0	0	0	0.0	0	0	3
Total		104	380	305	75	3.0	6	2	0	9	133	14.8	36	1	50

== Personal life ==
On March 17, 2012, Arrington married his girlfriend, VaShonda Murphy. They had their first child, almost exactly a year later, on March 16, 2013. On December 28, 2014, the two had their second son.
