= Kentucky Enforcers =

- League: ABA 2016-2018; NABL 2019; PBL 2021; TBL; 2021–present
- Founded: 2016
- History: Kentucky Enforcers; 2016–present
- Arena: Thomas More University
- Location: Crestview Hills, Kentucky
- Team colors
- Head coach: Dustin Driskell
- Ownership: Dustin Driskell
- Championships: 1
- Division titles: 2
Home	Away

The Kentucky Enforcers are a professional basketball team in Crestview Hills, Kentucky, and a member of The Basketball League (TBL).

== History ==
The Kentucky Enforcers were founded in 2016 by Dustin Driskell and Josh Avery. Dustin is acting Coach and Director of Basketball Operations, while Josh handles General Manager duties. The Enforcers are based in the Northern Kentucky, Cincinnati area where they competed in the ABA.

2016-2017 ABA season had some ups and downs for the Enforcers in their first inaugural season with a record of 21-14 . 2017-2018 However was a big change for the Enforcers going 40-0 and being ranked the #1 in the nation. The Enforcers were the NorthEast Division Champions.

After the 2018 season, they played the 2019 season in the semi-professional North American Basketball League (NABL) as part of a new Central Division. Where they took the league by storm being ranked #1 again with a 16–0 record to again win their Division. 2019 NABL MVP Cameron Mitchell 35.5ppg. 2019 NABL Coach of the Year Dustin Driskell

Early 2020 the Kentucky Enforcers decided to take a brief hiatus and take the year off due to the pandemic. Short lived the Kentucky Enforcers announced in Summer 2021 they had returned and joined the OBA fall league. (per all leagues records). The team competed in the Premier Basketball League for the 2021 season along with being an independent team playing teams from all different leagues, The Enforcers comprised a brilliant record of 35-0 and winning 3 different tournaments that summer.

On October 18, 2021, it was announced the Enforcers will be joining the "TBL" The Basketball League for the 2022 season. The Enforcers ended the season with a 14–10 record. Leading all scores in the TBL from start to finish was Cameron Mitchell of the Enforcers averaging 32.4ppg through the entire season.
