= Dayton Air Strikers =

Ohio basketball team

- Founded: 2010
- League: Midwest Basketball League
- Team history: PBL: 2011–2012; IBL: 2011; CBL: 2013; MBL 2016–present
- Based in: Dayton, Ohio
- Arena: Vandalia Recreation Complex
- Colors: Black, Red, White
- Owner: Anthony Byrd
- Head coach: Chris McGuire
- Website: www.daytonairstrikers.com

The Dayton Air Strikers are an American minor league basketball team based out of Dayton, Ohio. The team plays throughout North America between the United States and Canada. They currently compete in the Midwest Basketball League based out of Minnesota.

== History ==
Established in 2010, the Air Strikers started as an expansion franchise of the Premier Basketball League in the 2011 season, before competing in the International Basketball League as a "branding team" in the spring of 2011. They subsequently resumed play in the PBL for the 2012 season.

In 2013, they played in the Central Basketball League for one season (playing 6 games and did not return to the league the following season due to irreconcilable differences.

During 2014–2015 the team remained active on the Pro-Am circuit playing professional and club teams in the Great Lakes Summer League, and the Ohio Pro Development Basketball Organization hosting and traveling to teams located around Ohio, Indiana, and Kentucky.

The team announced its full return as a member of the Midwest Basketball League that started in April 2016. The Dayton Air Strikers went undefeated on its home court going 7-0 holding the record for the longest winning streak.

In July 2016 the team became the MBL East Division champions ending the regular season with a record of 12–1.

== Season-by-season ==
Season	W	L	Result	Playoffs
2010–2011 (PBL)	3	18	7th of 7	DNQ
2011 (IBL)	5	0	1st of 8 (branding division)	---
2012 (PBL)	6	11	6th of 9	DNQ
2013 (CBL)	5	1	5th of 5	DNQ
2014 (OPBO)	7	1		
2015 (GLSL)	7	1		
2016 (MBL)	12	1	1st of 11	TBD

== Player development ==
According to the team's website, more than 20 former Dayton Air Strikers players have gone on to play professionally in international leagues and other professional basketball organizations.

Players also have gone on to playing for the NBA D-League and the Harlem Globetrotters. In 2012 four players were drafted internationally to play in the NBL Canada including two players selected in the top seven of the draft.

== Alumni ==
Mark Gomillia (2012) - Oshawa Power

William Harris (2012) - Oshawa Power

Brandon Hassell (2012) - Summerside Storm

Avery Smith (2012) - Summerside Storm

Joe Thomasson (2016) - BC Dinamo București
