= Corey Bullock =

American football player (born 2001)

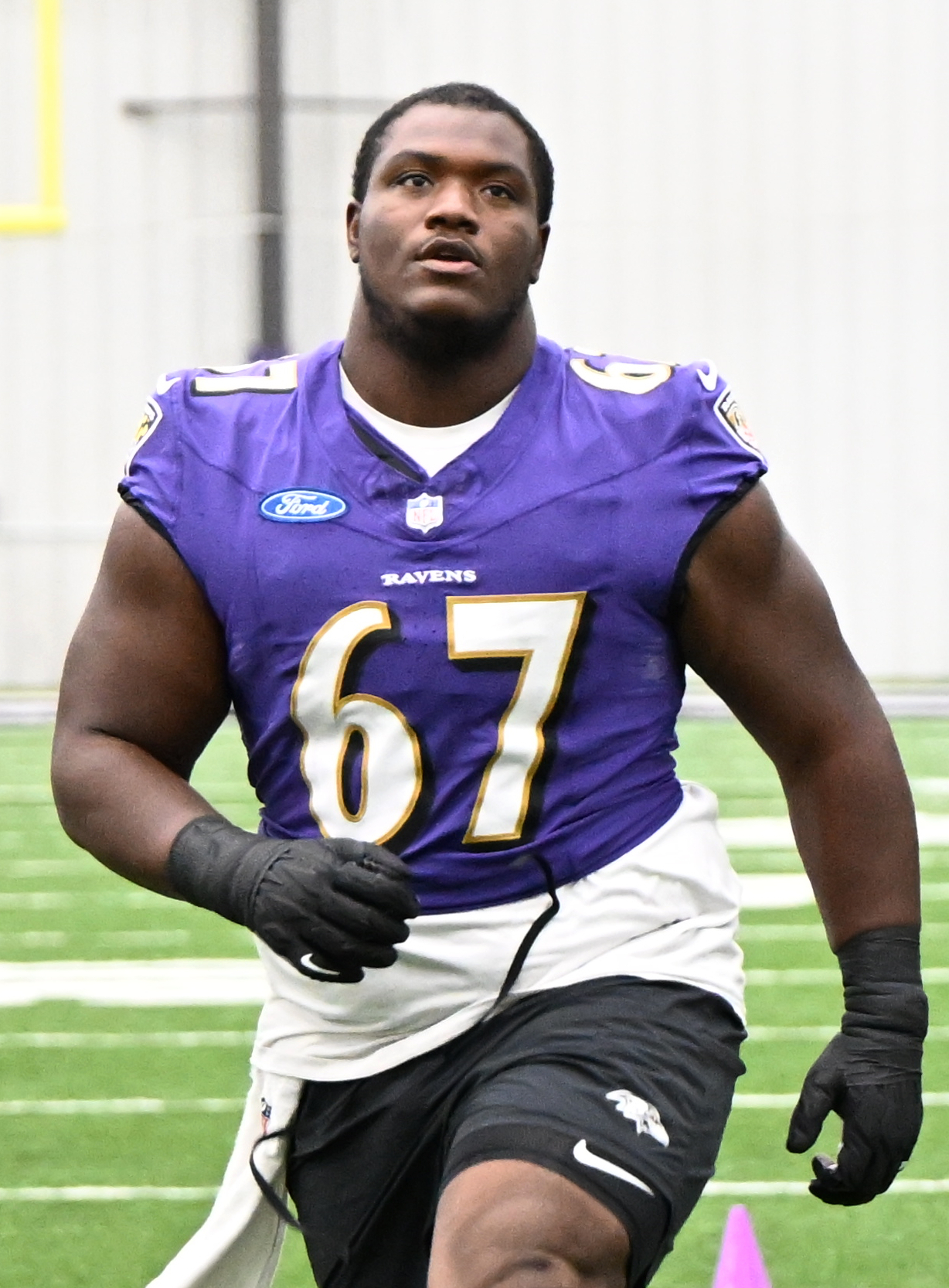
- Bullock with the Baltimore Ravens in 2024

No. 67 – Carolina Panthers
- Position: Guard
- Roster status: Active

Personal information
- Born: December 9, 2001 (age 24); Accokeek, Maryland, U.S.
- Listed height: 6 ft 3 in (1.91 m)
- Listed weight: 325 lb (147 kg)

Career information
- High school: Gwynn Park (Brandywine, Maryland)
- College: North Carolina Central (2019–2022); Maryland (2023)
- NFL draft: 2024: undrafted

Career history
- Baltimore Ravens (2024–2025); Carolina Panthers (2026–present)

Awards and highlights
- Second team All-MEAC (2021)

Career NFL statistics
- Games played: 16
- Games started: 0
- Stats at Pro Football Reference

Corey Bullock (born September 12, 2001) is an American professional football guard for the Carolina Panthers of the National Football League (NFL). He played his first three seasons of college football for the North Carolina Central Eagles before transferring to the Maryland Terrapins.

== Early life ==
Bullock attended Gwynn Park High School. He played offensive tackle for the team. He committed to the North Carolina Central Eagles.

== College career ==
Bullock played his first three seasons at North Carolina Central in the FCS. He earned second-team All-MEAC honors as a sophomore after only allowing one sack. In 2021, he entered the transfer portal and was picked up by the Maryland Terrapins. In his senior season, he played 11 games, earning honorable mention All-Big Ten honors and winning the Music City Bowl against Auburn.

== Professional career ==
Pre-draft measurables
Height	Weight	Arm length	Hand span	Wingspan	20-yard shuttle	Vertical jump	Broad jump	Bench press
6 ft 2 3/4 in (1.90 m)	307 lb (139 kg)	32 3/8 in (0.82 m)	9 1/8 in (0.23 m)	6 ft 5 1/2 in (1.97 m)	4.83 s	25.5 in (0.65 m)	7 ft 10 in (2.39 m)	15 reps
All values from Pro Day

=== Baltimore Ravens ===
Bullock was signed by the Ravens as an undrafted free agent after the 2024 NFL draft. In the 2024 NFL preseason, he was given the highest rookie offensive lineman grade by PFF and was named to their all-rookie team.

On August 30, 2026, Bullock was waived by the Ravens as a part of final roster cuts.

=== Carolina Panthers ===
On August 31, 2026, Bullock was claimed off of waivers by the Carolina Panthers.
