= Rose Catherine Pinkney =

American television development executive

- Born: Prince George's County, Maryland, US
- Education: Princeton University, A.B. UCLA, M.B.A.
- Occupation: Television executive
- Years active: 198?–present

Rose Catherine Pinkney (born 1964) is an American television development executive. She was hired as the VP Development and Original Programming for TV Land in 2012. Pinkney has previously served as Director of Programming at Twentieth Century Fox Television, senior vice president of comedy development at Paramount Pictures Television and executive vice president of programming and production at TV One. She most recently served as the head of the television arm of Laurence Fishburne's production company, Cinema Gypsy. Among Pinkney's accolades are Network Journal's 25 Most Influential Black Women in Business, Cable World's Top 50 Women in Cable and Black Enterprise's Top 50 Entertainment Executives.

== Early life and academic career ==
Pinkney was born and raised in Prince George's County, Maryland, the youngest child and only daughter of Joseph and Maud Pinkney. She points to her parents' marriage, which as of 2008 had lasted 56 years, as her model of personal values that she has carried through life. Hailing from Brandywine, Maryland, Pinkney is a graduate of Gwynn Park High School. She has an A.B. from Princeton University in sociology and an M.B.A. from UCLA's Anderson School of Management with a concentration in marketing and entertainment management. Pinkney is a graduate of Princeton and a lifetime member of its Association of Black Princeton Alumni. She graduated from the Anderson School in 1988 and as of 2011 served on its Alumni Advisory Board.

== Professional career ==
While director of programming at Twentieth Century Fox, she developed series such as The X-Files and supervised In Living Color for four years. While serving as director of programming she developed comedy, drama and alternative series and as current programming executive, she oversaw the production of several comedies, dramas and alternative shows each year. Among the other shows she developed were New York Undercover, South Central, and Alien Nation.

Subsequently, she served as Upton Entertainment's vice president and head of television. Here she supervised the creation of New York Undercover.

Next, she was senior vice president of comedy development at Paramount Network Television, where over the course of nearly ten years she developed more than 30 television programs for six television networks, including United Paramount Network's (UPN) Girlfriends. She joined Paramount in 1995 as vice president of comedy development and was promoted to senior vice president and department head in 2002. During her time at Paramount other shows she developed included Becker, One on One and Andy Richter Controls the Universe. As department head, her responsibilities included identifying writers, directors, talent and ideas for comedy series for television.

She was hired at TV One, which is the second-oldest and second-largest black television network behind BET, in December 2005, and she started in January 2006. At TV One, where she served as executive vice president of programming and development, she was responsible for programming strategy and oversaw all program production, acquisition, scheduling and business development for the network. Her time at TV One was spent in unscripted reality and lifestyle programming television. When UPN and WB merged to form CW in September 2006 prior to the 2006–07 United States network television season, several of the African-American-themed sitcoms that Pinkney had developed while at Paramount were short-lived. Pinkney has been one of the more outspoken executives on the issue of portrayal of race relations on air.

In December 2008, Cinema Gypsy, which is Laurence Fishburne's production company, signed a first-look deal with CBS Paramount Network Television to produce television shows. At that time, Pinkney was named to head the television arm of Cinema Gypsy as it expanded its operations to television programming. In her capacity, she oversaw the development of programming for broadcast and cable networks.

In 2012, Pinkney became VP Development and Original Programming at TV Land, assuming responsibility for TV Land’s existing original series and the development of new ones. Pinkney reports to the EVP Development and Original Programming Keith Cox.
