= Dekabriean Eldridge =

American basketball player (born 1992)

No. 1 – Austin Bats
- Position: Shooting guard
- League: ABA

Personal information
- Born: June 12, 1992 (age 34) Dallas, Texas
- Listed height: 6 ft 3 in (1.91 m)
- Listed weight: 190 lb (86 kg)

Career information
- High school: Lincoln (Dallas, Texas)
- College: NMJC (2011–2013); New Mexico State (2013–2015)
- NBA draft: 2015: undrafted
- Playing career: 2015–present

Career history
- 2015–2016: Frayles de Guasave
- 2017: Correcaminos UAT Victoria
- 2017: Garra Cañera de Navolato
- 2017: Dynamic
- 2018: Dallas Mustangs
- 2018–2019: Al-Nasr
- 2022: The Panamaniacs (TBT)
- 2024–present: Austin Bats

Career highlights
- All-ABA First Team (2025); NABL champion (2018); NABL Finals MVP (2018); WAC All-Newcomer Team (2014)

Dekabriean Eldridge (born June 12, 1992), also credited as D.K. Eldridge, is an American professional basketball player for the Austin Bats of the American Basketball Association.

== Professional career ==
After finishing college, Eldridge spent two seasons in Mexico, first playing for Frayles de Guasave of the CIBACOPA from 2015 to 2016.

On January 20, 2017, he signed for Correcaminos UAT Victoria of the Liga Nacional. Over eight regular-season games, he averaged 21.2 points, 3.1 rebounds and 1.1 assists per game.

On April 9, Eldridge signed for Garra Cañera de Navolato of the CIBACOPA. Over 13 regular-season games he averaged 12.8 points, 4.5 rebounds and 2.2 assists per game.

On August 10, 2017, Eldridge signed a two-year contract with the Serbian team Dynamic Belgrade. On December 30, 2017, he parted ways with Dynamic.

Eldridge led the Dallas Mustangs to the 2018 North American Basketball League championship, and was named NABL Finals MVP.

He played for Al-Nasr of the Libyan Division I Basketball League from 2018 to 2019.

Eldridge played for The Panamaniacs in The Basketball Tournament 2022.

He joined the Austin Bats of the American Basketball Association in 2024, and received All-ABA First Team honors for the 2024–2025 season.
