= Tampa Bay Hawks (basketball) =

NABL affiliated professional basketball ball team in Florida

- Leagues: FBA; 2012–2014; NABL; 2017–present
- Founded: 2006
- History: Tampa Bay Sharks; 2006–2011; Tampa Bay Rebels; 2014–2017; Tampa Bay Hawks; 2017–present
- Arena: Florida College
- Location: Tampa, Florida
- Championships: 3
- Website: www.tampabayhawks.com

The Tampa Bay Hawks are a team in the North American Basketball League (NABL) in Tampa, Florida.

== History ==
Tampa Bay Sharks, the club started operations by winning the championship in the Bay Pro-Am tournament. That year, the team traveled to Argentina and Mexico where, for the first time, some of our best players were signed by international clubs

In 2011, we changed the name to Tampa Bay Rebels and co-founded the Florida Basketball Association. The newly formed Tampa Bay Rebels won the 2012 FBA Championship and reached the finals for three consecutive years. The inaugural season of 2012 was played with four teams. Tampa Bay Rebels defeated Heartland Prowl to win the first FBA championship. The Rebels (10-2) and Prowl (9-3) dominated league play in 2013 and met in the championship game once again. Heartland Prowl avenged their first season loss by defeating Tampa Bay 111-109. Prowl forward Arnold Lewis was named FBA Finals MVP, scoring 27 points.

On December 3, 2017, it was announced that the team would be joining the NABL for the upcoming 2018 season. On February 6, 2018, the Hawks named Florida College as their arena.
