= Arkansas GlacierCats =

The Arkansas GlacierCats were a short-lived minor-league hockey team located in Little Rock, Arkansas.

The Arkansas GlacierCats were a Western Professional Hockey League (WPHL) franchise in Little Rock, Arkansas. The team was owned by Ed Novess and Dan Hart of Austin, Texas and they played in the WPHL during the 1998–99 and 1999–2000 seasons. Home games were played at the Barton Coliseum.

The GlacierCats were popular in their first year but were forced to suspend operations permanently in April 2000, due to competition by the Arkansas RiverBlades of the East Coast Hockey League who played at the newly opened ALLTEL Arena in North Little Rock.
