= Midwest Professional Basketball Association =

Midwest Professional Basketball Association (MPBA)
- Sport: Basketball
- Founded: August 2014
- First season: 2015
- CEO: Ed Schumer
- Motto: Welcome to the future of minor league basketball
- No. of teams: 8
- Country: United States
- Continent: FIBA Americas
- Most recent champion: Chicago Blues (2016)
- Most titles: Champaign Swarm, Chicago Blues (1)
- Website: www.theMPBA.com

The Midwest Professional Basketball Association (MPBA) was a professional men's basketball league that began play in January 2015. The six charter members were: Bloomington Flex, Champaign Swarm, Chicago Force, Gateway Steam, St. Louis RiverSharks and Windy City Groove.

Of the six inaugural season teams, only the Bloomington Flex have previously competed. The Flex were 2012 and 2013 champions of the Premier Basketball League (PBL). After a perfect 18-0 record in 2014, the team was suspended and then dismissed from the PBL by league officials after a scheduling conflict in the 2014 PBL playoffs.

MPBA is organized by Ed Schumer, Commissioner and CEO, Steven A. "Buzz" Zeller, Chief Operating Officer, Craig Fata, Associate Commissioner and Chief Communications Officer, and A.J. Guyton, Associate Commissioner and Director of Basketball Personnel.

The league appears to have ceased operations in 2017.

== History ==
The league tipped off its inaugural season on January 2, 2015, as the St. Louis RiverSharks and Gateway Steam played at Family Arena in St. Charles, Missouri. St. Louis defeated Gateway 108-96. Two more games took place at Family Arena on January 4, as the RiverSharks hosted the Bloomington Flex and the Gateway Steam hosted the Chicago Force. The RiverSharks upset the Flex 113-109, ending Bloomington's 24-game win streak, which had dated back to May 2013. The Steam defeated the Force 115-103.

The first time all six teams were in action at the same time was January 15, when the Flex hosted the RiverSharks in Bloomington, the Champaign Swarm hosted the Steam, and the Force hosted the Windy City Groove. All three games were broadcast in high definition via multi-camera productions on the league's website.

The 2015 regular season ended on April 7. The playoffs began two nights later in Bloomington in a Final Four-style format. The St. Louis RiverSharks secured the top seed with a 16-4 record by virtue of a 3-1 season series win over the Bloomington Flex, who also finished 16-4. The Champaign Swarm entered as the #3 seed with a 15-5 record, and the Gateway Steam were fourth at 5-15.

The first game of the semifinals saw the RiverSharks beat the Steam 153-129. In the second game, the Swarm handed the Flex their first-ever playoff loss, 111-100, to advance to the championship game.

The championship game, held April 10 at U.S. Cellular Coliseum was won by the Swarm 115-106, after trailing by as many as 17 points in the first half and by as many as 13 in the fourth quarter. Champaign's Avery Smith was named Playoff Most Valuable Player after averaging 32 points and seven rebounds per game in the postseason.

On September 9, 2015, the Lima Express, which had played their first two seasons in the Premier Basketball League, were announced as the first-ever expansion team in the MPBA. Following the Lima announcement, on September 21, the league announced the Pontiac 66ers as the league's second expansion team for the 2016 season.

Then, on October 30, 2015, the MPBA announced the Bloomington Flex, which were a founding member of the league, would not be playing in the MPBA in the upcoming season, because the team was "unable to submit, per league rules, a venue agreement or playing dates for the upcoming season." The same day, the Flex announced they would not be playing in any league in 2016. The Flex's departure leaves the league with seven teams for the 2016 season.

The league announced on November 5, 2015, that it had assumed control of the Chicago Force and Windy City Groove franchises, citing "league rules regarding ownership and team operation guidelines." Coaches Rick Pryor and Handy Johnson, who had coached the respective teams in 2015, would be retained, the league said. General Manager Don Starks would be replaced with Jay Carter as GM and Kelly Norris-Jones as Assistant GM.

On November 13, 2015, the league announced that the Chicago Force would be changing their name to the Chicago Blues, citing the existence of a women's tackle football team of the same name in the same city, which had been in operation for thirteen years. On the same date a trademark application was filed by Chicago Basketball League Corporation for the name and logo of the Windy City Groove, despite the fact the name and logo were created by Joyce Thomas of Joyce Thomas Designs in October 2015.

On December 14 the former front office of the Groove announced they would be joining the American Basketball Association with their season set to begin December 20, and continuing to use the Groove name and logo. A December 17, 2015 email from ABA CEO Joe Newman to MPBA officials stated the name and logo in question were not to be used in the ABA until the matter was resolved. Windy City defeated Chicago Fury 109-106 on Dec. 20, and continued to use the name and logo in the ABA, despite a cease and desist letter issued by MPBA attorneys on January 7, 2016.

On July 20, 2016, the league announced the Jacksonville (Illinois) Generals would be joining the MPBA for the 2017 season. The team will play its games at MacMurray College.

On August 9, 2016, the league announced the Eureka (Illinois) Blaze would be joining the MPBA for the 2017 season. The team will play its games at Eureka High School.

On August 21, 2016, the league announced that the Lima Express will be moving to Bloomington, Illinois for the 2017 season. The team will play its games at U.S. Cellular Coliseum. They will also be the hosts of the 2017 postseason tournament.

On August 31, 2016, the league observed the milestone of advancing its 50th player to a higher domestic or foreign league since beginning play in January 2015, when 2016 Most Valuable Player Alfonzo Houston of the Pontiac 66ers signed with Nuova Polisportiva Stabia in Italy. To date, the MPBA has sent two players to the National Basketball Development League (NBA D-League), 47 players to overseas teams, and one to training camp with the NBA's Chicago Bulls.

== Teams ==
Team	City	Arena	Founded	First season in MPBA
Bloomington Express	Bloomington, Illinois	U.S. Cellular Coliseum	2013	2016
Champaign Swarm	Champaign, Illinois	Parkland College	2014	2015
Chicago Blues	Chicago, Illinois	Ray & Joan Kroc Corps Community Center	2014	2015
Eureka Blaze	Eureka, Illinois	Eureka High School	2016	2017
Gateway Steam	St. Louis, Missouri	Emerson Performance Center	2014	2015
Jacksonville Generals	Jacksonville, Illinois	MacMurray College	2016	2017
Pontiac 66ers	Pontiac, Illinois	Pontiac High School	2016	2016
St. Louis RiverSharks	St. Louis, Missouri	Emerson Performance Center	2014	2015
Windy City Groove	Chicago, Illinois	Ray & Joan Kroc Corps Community Center	2014	2015

=== Former teams ===
- Bloomington Flex went on hiatus in October 2015

== 2015 Awards ==
Most Valuable Player: Justin Bocot, Bloomington Flex

Coach of the Year: Al Grushkin, St. Louis RiverSharts

Defensive Player of the Year: Darius Smith, Chicago Force

Sixth Man of the Year: Aaron Weaver, Champaign Swarm

Playoff MVP: Avery Smith, Champaign Swarm

All-MPBA First Team: Justin Bocot (unanimous selection); Jerrold Brooks, St. Louis RiverSharks; Anthony Slack, Bloomington Flex (unanimous selection); Keith DeWitt, St. Louis RiverSharks; Marcus Goode, St. Louis RiverSharks.

All-MPBA Second Team: Nate Fuqua, Windy City Groove; Tarvin Gaines, Gateway Steam; Aaron Weaver, Champaign Swarm; Matt Salley, Bloomington Flex; Derrick McDonald, Chicago Force; Lavante Douglas, Windy City Groove.

All-Defensive Team: Darius Smith (unanimous selection); Nate Fuqua, Terry Evans, St. Louis RiverSharks; Keith DeWitt, Anthony Slack; Marcus Goode.

== 2016 Awards ==
Most Valuable Player: Alfonzo Houston, Pontiac 66ers

Coach of the Year: Durrell Robinson, Pontiac 66ers

Defensive Player of the Year: Connell Crossland, Gateway Steam

Sixth Man of the Year: C.J. Hampton, Windy City Groove

Playoff MVP: Diante Watkins, Chicago Blues

All-MPBA First Team: Alfonzo Houston, Pontiac 66ers (unanimous selection); Dion Cooksey, Windy City Groove; Connell Crossland, Gateway Steam (unanimous selection); Kyle Meyer, Lima Express (unanimous selection); Marcus Hammonds, Pontiac 66ers.

All-MPBA Second Team: Cordaryl Ballard, Lima Express; Michael Rogers, Champaign Swarm; Al Rapier, Chicago Blues; Isiah Martin, Windy City Groove; Aaron Williams, St. Louis RiverSharks; Devon Jenkins, Windy City Groove.

All-Defensive Team: Jordan Walker, Champaign Swarm; Dion Cooksey, Windy City Groove; Jakeem Hill, Chicago Blues; Connell Crossland, Gateway Steam; Marcus Hammonds, Pontiac 66ers; Aaron Williams, St. Louis RiverSharks.
