= Frank Williams (basketball) =

American basketball player (born 1980)

Personal information
- Born: February 25, 1980 (age 46) Peoria, Illinois, U.S.
- Listed height: 6 ft 3 in (1.91 m)
- Listed weight: 212 lb (96 kg)

Career information
- High school: Manual (Peoria, Illinois)
- College: Illinois (1999–2002)
- NBA draft: 2002: 1st round, 25th overall pick
- Drafted by: Denver Nuggets
- Playing career: 2002–2010
- Position: Point guard
- Number: 30

Career history
- 2002–2004: New York Knicks
- 2004–2005: Chicago Bulls
- 2006–2007: Sioux Falls Skyforce
- 2007–2008: Scafati Basket
- 2008–2009: Sioux Falls Skyforce
- 2009: Unión de Santa Fe
- 2009–2010: Ciclista Olímpico

Career highlights
- Second-team All-American – NABC (2001); Third-team All-American – AP (2001); Big Ten Player of the Year (2001); 2× First-team All-Big Ten (2001, 2002); McDonald's All-American Game (1998); Second-team Parade All-American (1998); Illinois Mr. Basketball (1998)
- Stats at NBA.com
- Stats at Basketball Reference

Frank Lowell Williams (born February 25, 1980) is an American former professional basketball player. As a point guard, Williams was drafted out of the University of Illinois with the 25th overall pick in the 2002 NBA draft by the Denver Nuggets.

In 2004, Williams was named to the University of Illinois All-Century Team.

== Early life ==
Williams attended Manual High School in Peoria, Illinois, where he was a member of one of the most heralded teams in the nation. Williams led Peoria Manual to the final two of four consecutive IHSA class AA boys state basketball tournaments, in 1996 as a sophomore and again in 1997 as a junior. In both tournaments, Williams was named to the five-player All-Tournament team. As a senior, Williams was named the 1998 Illinois Mr. Basketball.

== College career ==
After high school, Williams attended the University of Illinois, and played three seasons for the Fighting Illini under head coach Bill Self, leading the team to a string of NCAA Tournament appearances. After the 2000–2001 season, Williams was named the Big Ten player of the year, and received the Chicago Tribune Silver Basketball award. While at Illinois, Williams was re-united with high school teammates Marcus Griffin and Sergio McClain, (a.k.a. "The Peoria 3") where they earned a number one seed and eventually went to the Elite 8 in 2001. Williams' high school coach, Wayne McClain (Sergio's father) also was named assistant coach for the Illini during his time there. He was elected to the "Illini Men's Basketball All-Century Team" in 2004. In 2007, Williams was voted one of the "100 Legends of the IHSA Boys Basketball Tournament," recognizing his superior performance in his appearance in the tournament.

== Professional career ==
The New York Knicks acquired Williams in a draft-day trade in 2002 from the Denver Nuggets. He played sparingly in his first season, but found a bit more time on the court during the first half of the 2003–04 season. Unfortunately, new GM Isiah Thomas then traded for star point guard Stephon Marbury, and Williams was relegated back to the end of the bench. The Chicago Bulls acquired him as part of a multi-player trade in the next off-season, where Williams was popular due to his time with the Illini, and expected him to compete with Kirk Hinrich for the starting point guard job, but he showed up to training camp out of shape and spent most of the 2004–05 season on injured reserve. Dissatisfied with his effort, Chicago announced that he would not be re-signed for the next season. Williams signed with the Los Angeles Clippers on October 1, 2005, but was released four days later.

Williams' final NBA game was on March 9, 2005, in a 97–84 win over the Portland Trail Blazers where he recorded no stats in 6 minutes of playing time. Williams played a total of 86 NBA games and averaged 2.9 points and 1.9 assists.

== Personal ==
On June 10, 2009, Williams and his younger brother, Aaron, were arrested on drug charges at his Peoria, Illinois home after agents seized 55 grams of marijuana. Frank Williams was charged with unlawful possession of marijuana and unlawful possession of marijuana with intent to deliver, and accepted a plea deal of a misdemeanor marijuana possession charge and a $1,000 fine.

Williams’ son, Da’Monte Williams, was a guard for the University of Illinois basketball team.

== Notes ==
Awards and achievements
Preceded by Sergio McClain	Illinois Mr. Basketball Award Winner; 1998	Succeeded by Brian Cook
