= Gwynn Park High School =

Location
- 13800 Brandywine Road; Brandywine, Maryland 20613; United States; 38°42′7″N 76°52′16.5″W

Information
- School type: Public high school
- Founded: 1949
- School district: Prince George's County Public Schools
- Principal: Naima Hopkins Vinson
- Staff: around 120
- Grades: 9–12
- Enrollment: 1,102
- Campus: Suburban
- Colors: Gold and Black
- Mascot: Yellow Jackets
- Feeder schools: Gwynn Park Middle School
- Website: https://www.pgcps.org/gwynnparkhs/

Gwynn Park High School (GPHS) is in Brandywine census-designated place, Prince George's County, Maryland, United States, a suburban area near Washington DC.

It serves the following CDPs: Brandywine, Accokeek, Aquasco, Baden, Cedarville, and portions of Croom. It also serves the Town of Eagle Harbor.

== Safety ==
In 2022, Gwynn Park High School was one of the four schools in PGCPS that faced bomb threats.

== Sports ==
The school has won state championships in boys basketball in 1968, 1969, 1970, 1972, 1974, 1976, 1980, 1983, 1987, 1988; girls basketball in 1974, 2002, 2003, 2004; baseball in 1984; Boys Outdoor Track and Field 2002 and football in 2005.

== Notable alumni ==
- Kyle Arrington, professional football player
- Corey Bullock, NFL football player
- Rashad Carmichael, professional football player
- Isaiah Coulter, professional football player
- James Albert Graham, Congressional Medal of Honor recipient in Vietnam honored at Arlington National Cemetery
- Jarrett Hurd, professional boxer
- Seth Mitchell, professional boxer
- Adrian Moten, professional football player
- Aaron Parker, professional football player
- Rose Catherine Pinkney, television executive
- Tre Sullivan, professional football player
- Phil Taylor, professional football player
- Patrick Doctor, professional basketball player
- Brandon Fobbs, actor
- Rock Newman, former boxing promoter
- Sharrod Ford, professional basketball player
- Corey Allmond, professional basketball player
- Louis Hinnant, college basketball coach
