= Indianapolis Diesels =

- Founded: 2007
- League: ABA (2010–2011); PBL (2012–2017); NABL (2017–2018)
- Team history: Indiana Diesels (2010–2013); Indianapolis Diesels (2013–2018)
- Based in: Indianapolis, Indiana, United States
- Colors: Green, black and blue
- Owner: Rex Voils et al.
- Head coach: Aaron Hogg
- Championships: 0
- Cheerleaders: Diesel Divas
- Dancers: Diesel Dance Squad
- Mascot: Dunkin' Diesel
- Website: dieselshoops.com

The Indianapolis Diesels, formerly known as the Indiana Diesels, were a team in the North American Basketball League (NABL). Based in Indianapolis, Indiana, the Diesels played their home games at Emmerich Manual High School south of downtown Indianapolis during their last seasons.

In their inaugural season in the American Basketball Association, the team finished with an 8–4 record and defeated the West Virginia Blazers in the first round of the playoffs before losing to the Chicago Steam. The next year, 2011, they moved to the Premier Basketball League (PBL) and played their next two seasons in Columbus, Indiana. In their last season playing in Columbus, the team reached the PBL semi-finals. The next season, after moving to Manual High School, the team reached the PBL Finals; however, they lost to the Rochester Razorsharks. The team joined the North American Basketball League in 2017, but apparently disbanded after 2018.
