= Champaign Swarm =

Professional minor-league basketball team in Illinois, US

- Founded: 2014
- League: Midwest Professional Basketball Association
- Based in: Champaign, Illinois
- Arena: Dodds Athletic Center
- Colors: Yellow, Black
- Owner: Kevin Applebee
- Head coach: Matt Neaville
- Championships: 1 (2015)

The Champaign Swarm are a professional minor-league basketball team that plays in the Midwest Professional Basketball Association (MPBA). Based in Champaign, Illinois, the Swarm play their home games at Parkland College.

== History ==
The Swarm won the inaugural MPBA championship by defeating the Bloomington Flex in a semifinal game and then the St. Louis RiverSharks in the final, 115-106. Avery Smith, who played three seasons at the University of Wisconsin-Milwaukee. The Swarm were coached in 2015 by Chris Daleo.

== Season-by-season ==
Season	W	L	Result	Playoffs
2015	15	5	3rd of 6	2-0; MPBA champion
2016			TBD	TBD
