= Arkansas Impact =

Former American basketball team

- Founded: 2006
- League: Premier Basketball League; 2007
- Team history: Arkansas Impact; 2007- 2008
- Based in: Little Rock, Arkansas
- Arena: Barton Coliseum
- Colors: Red, white, blue
- Owner: Mike Land
- Head coach: Todd Day
- Championships: 0
- Dancers: TBA

The Arkansas Impact was a team in the Premier Basketball League that played in the league's inaugural 2008 season. They played their home games at the Barton Coliseum in Little Rock. The city had been home to the Arkansas Rimrockers (who played in the American Basketball Association (ABA) for their first season and in the D-League for their last two), and the Coliseum was going to be part-time home to the failed ABA expansion team the Arkansas Fantastics. The original head coach was former Arkansas Razorback Todd Day.

When the list of teams for 2008-2009 was revealed on the PBL website, the Impact was not on it and therefore is considered defunct.
