= Bloomington Flex =

- Founded: 2011
- League: Midwest Professional Basketball Association
- Team history: Central Illinois Drive (2011–2012); Bloomington Flex (2012–2015)
- Based in: Bloomington, Illinois
- Colors: Navy blue, sky blue, gold, white
- Owner: Scott Henderson
- Head coach: AJ Guyton, Carlnel Wiley, Dee Brown
- Championships: 2 (2012 and 2013)

The Bloomington Flex were a professional minor league basketball team based in Bloomington, Illinois. The Flex last played in the Midwest Professional Basketball Association (MPBA) in 2015.

== History ==
Formed in 2011 as the Central Illinois Drive, they were a member of the Premier Basketball League (PBL) for three seasons.

=== 2012 season ===
The Flex played the 2012 PBL season as the expansion Central Illinois Drive. The Drive finished the 2012 regular season 18–1 and swept the Scranton/Wilkes-Barre Steamers in the first round of the PBL playoffs. On April 14, 2012, the Drive completed a two-game sweep of the defending PBL champions, the Rochester RazorSharks, at U.S Cellular Coliseum to win the 2012 PBL Championship.

Despite their success, Drive owner Jim Bob Morris decided he no longer wanted to own the team after just one season. Scott Henderson, the executive vice president of the Drive, wanted to take over the team, but he and Morris could not come to an agreement about the use of name and logo for the Drive. Henderson and his management team then decided to reboot the entire operation. On December 1, 2012, Henderson announced the new franchise as the Bloomington Flex.

=== 2013 season ===
The Flex logo, uniform prototype and colors were announced at a news conference on January 18, 2013. Prior to the start of the 2013 season, the PBL merged with the Independent Basketball Association (IBA), to create the IBA-PBL.

The Flex opened the 2013 season on March 15 against the Sauk Valley Predators, losing on the road 100–94. The Flex then dropped their home opener on March 29 to the Gary Splash, spoiling their championship banner-raising ceremony. But the team went on to win ten of its next twelve regular season games.

As the season continued, the owners of the PBL's franchises became increasingly unhappy with either playoff structure suggested by Barry Bradford, the IBA-PBL commissioner who owns the IBA's Kankakee County Soldiers franchise and who had served as the IBA commissioner before the leagues merged. The PBL teams were also displeased about instances of IBA teams failing to appear for scheduled games against PBL teams over the final two weeks of the season. With less than two weeks left in the regular season, on May 24, 2013, the four top former PBL teams (Bloomington, Rochester, Indiana Diesels and Sauk Valley) broke away from the IBA to re-establish the PBL and hold a four-team playoff, identical to the PBL's 2012 format.

In the 2013 playoffs, the Flex swept the Indiana Diesels in two games and then completed another two-game sweep of the Rochester RazorSharks, 106–86 and 88–77, winning the first game in Bloomington and clinching the PBL title at Blue Cross Arena in Rochester. In the two wins, the Flex defense held in check the RazorSharks high-scoring offense, which had averaged 118.5 points per game in the regular season.

=== 2014 season ===
The Flex finished the 2014 season with a perfect 18–0 record, winning the PBL Midwest Division championship and earning the top seed and home-court advantage throughout the playoffs.

When league officials realized the championship series was scheduled to take place over Easter weekend, Flex owner Henderson requested a schedule change and the league moved the playoff schedule up by one week. The change resulted in a facility conflict for the second place team in the East Division, the Carolina Pee Dee Vipers. Carolina had no available dates in its arena, the Florence Civic Center. The league proposed the entire series be played in Rochester, but Carolina refused.

The league canceled the entire first round of the playoffs, including the Midwest series between the Indianapolis Diesels and Bloomington Flex, and announced the finals would start April 6 in Rochester. However, Bloomington was contractually locked into two dates at its arena, U.S. Cellular Coliseum, on April 4, which had originally been scheduled as a regular season game against the Lima Express, and April 6, which the team had booked when the playoff schedule was announced.

Henderson balked at having to play what was amounting to an exhibition game Friday, travelling Saturday, and then playing Sunday afternoon in Rochester, even though the league offered to pay all expenses to fly Bloomington to Rochester on Saturday.

While the two sides were still negotiating for a way for Bloomington to appear in Rochester the league abruptly announced on April 3 that Bloomington was disqualified from the playoffs and suspended for the entire 2015 season "due to its unwillingness and inability to participate in the championship series." The league also announced that Bloomington would be replaced in the finals by second place Indianapolis despite refusing to consider having the third place Buffalo 716ers replace Carolina in the first round.

On April 28, 2014, the PBL terminated its agreement with the Flex due to actions detrimental to the league allegedly caused by owner Scott Henderson and his contract with the U.S. Cellular Coliseum, despite the owner of the league having a similar contract in Rochester, which was honored.

=== 2015 ===
The Flex played in 2015 as a founding member of the new Midwest Professional Basketball Association (MPBA). On December 27, the team announced that Carlnel Wiley, Jr. would replace Guyton as the team's head coach.

In October 2015, it was reported that the franchise would sit out the 2016 season due to the instability of the available leagues.
