= Rochester RazorSharks =

American minor-league basketball team

- Leagues: American Basketball Association; 2005–2007; Premier Basketball League; 2008–2017, 2020, 2022; North American Premier Basketball; 2018
- Founded: 2005
- Folded: 2018
- History: Rochester RazorSharks; 2005–2018
- Location: Rochester, New York
- Team colors: Gray, blue, and black
- Championships: 8 (2006 ABA, 2008, 2009, 2011, 2014, 2015, 2016, 2017 PBL)

The Rochester RazorSharks were a professional basketball team based in Rochester, New York. The RazorSharks were founded in 2005 as a member of the American Basketball Association (ABA). They remained in the ABA until 2007, leaving the league to become founding members of the Premier Basketball League (PBL). The RazorSharks have won eight championships to date – the 2006 ABA championship and PBL titles in 2008, 2009, 2011, 2014, 2015, 2016, and 2017. The team joined the new North American Premier Basketball for the 2018 season and planned to play in The Basketball League in 2019 before the team decided to sit out the season.

The RazorSharks announced in August 2019 that the team would return in a re-launched PBL for the 2020 season with the franchise rights acquired by Mooreland Productions, LLC, a local entertainment company, and have stated they will play in a new venue. The ownership opened a new recreation center called Fast Break Sports for the team to play home games in late 2020, while the team also joined the Pro Basketball Association (PBA) for the 2021 season.

== History ==
=== 2005–2006 ===
The Rochester RazorSharks were founded in 2005 as an American Basketball Association expansion team. The RazorSharks had much success during their first season, as they finished their inaugural regular season at 26–4, ranked #1 in the ABA Pit Bull Power Rankings, and were named as one of ProBasketBallNews.com's Top 10 Minor League teams. They also led the ABA in attendance. Their regular season high was 6,192 against Indiana. Due to their success at the gate, Rochester hosted the 2006 ABA Great Eight Tournament. On March 26, the RazorSharks won the ABA championship, defeating the SoCal Legends 117–114 in front of a then franchise record crowd of 6,377.

The RazorSharks won a league title in their first season, which continued a Rochester basketball tradition: a league title in a team's first season. The Rochester Royals won the 1950–51 National Basketball Association championship and the Rochester Zeniths captured the 1978–79 Continental Basketball Association title.

=== 2006–2007 ===
During the team's first off-season, the RazorSharks re-signed head coach Rod Baker. The deal was a two-year contract, keeping the 2005–06 ABA Coach of the Year in Rochester until the end of the 2007–2008 season. Despite the loss of 2006 ABA MVP Chris Carrawell, the RazorSharks reloaded by signing key players such as C/F Mike Mackell and including the mid-season pickup of G/F Ricky Price.

The team opened the season with two wins on the road, returning to Rochester for their 2006 home opener on November 16, a 107–93 win over the rival Buffalo Silverbacks. Two days later on November 18, ABA Commissioner John Salley presented the players and staff with their championship rings, and helped hoist the 2005–06 ABA Championship banner to the rafters of the Blue Cross Arena. A 124–114 win over the Maryland Nighthawks followed the ceremony.

On December 28, the RazorSharks beat the Cape Cod Frenzy 92–88. The win was the franchise's 24th consecutive home victory, eclipsing the local pro basketball record set by the 1949–50 Rochester Royals and the 1978–79 Rochester Zeniths. The announced attendance of 7,858 was not only a franchise high, but a local high for a pro basketball game. The RazorSharks finished the regular season with an 18–0 home record, extending their home win streak to 35 consecutive wins in the process. It had been over a year since the franchise's last home loss. The Niagara DareDevils had beaten Rochester on November 24, 2005.

On March 22, the RazorSharks announced they were leaving the ABA to help form the new Premier Basketball League.

=== 2008 ===
The team's first year in the PBL was very successful, finishing with an 18–2 record and the top seed in the league playoffs. Following first and second-round byes, they defeated the Reading Railers 100–76 for a berth in the championship game. Rochester's success came despite a large turnover of players, as there were only four holdovers from the 2007 team (James Reaves, John Halas, Demond Stewart, and Keith Friel).

On March 30, the RazorSharks won the PBL's inaugural championship, defeating the Arkansas Impact 142–112. Another notable incident in the title game was forward Sammy Monroe grabbing the rim for a rebound and shattering the backboard in the process. The glass shrapnel injured teammate James "Mook" Reaves and delayed the game for 45 minutes while the backboard was replaced and medical staff tended to Reaves' injuries. For the championship game Rochester had a record crowd with 9,717 in attendance, a record which still stands today.

=== 2009 ===
Reaves, Friel and Jerice Crouch returned to the Sharks in 2009, along with role players Ron Rollerson and Steve Hailey. Chris Iversen was promoted from the front office to assistant coach during the off-season.

The team struggled early, losing three of their first four games. On January 19, the Vermont Frost Heaves ended Rochester's 48-game home winning streak. However, the RazorSharks won all 15 remaining regular-season games to finish the regular season 17–3, winning the league's Eastern Division and the second seed in the PBL playoffs. The PBL semifinals pitted the RazorSharks against the third-seeded Manchester Millrats. The teams split the first two games of the best-of-three series, the visitor winning each game. Back at the BCA, the Sharks won Game 3 110–103 to advance to the PBL championship series.

Due to arena difficulties in Battle Creek, the PBL announced that the planned three-game series would instead be a single game held on April 19 in Rochester. The RazorSharks won the game easily 152–115. Sammy Monroe shattered the backboard again delaying the games for 45 minutes in the first quarter.

=== 2011 ===
After starting the season 2–6, the RazorSharks finished the season 12–8, good for a third-place finish in the league. Rochester defeated Quebec and Lawton-Fort Sill in three-game series for the franchise's fourth title in six seasons.

=== 2013–14 ===
In 2013–14 the RazorSharks would win their first PBL championship title in three years after finishing 17–1 during the regular season and defeating the Indianapolis Diesels two games to one. Jerice Crouch would be named the Playoff MVP.

=== 2015 ===
For the 2015 season, the RazorSharks named Robert Spon as their head coach. Before joining the team, Spon worked as a scout for the Cleveland Cavaliers and earned the 2010–11 PBL Coach of the Year award. Chris Iversen also returned as an assistant coach after being away during the 2013–14 season, having been part of the organization since its inception.

The RazorSharks went on to post a 15–0 regular-season record and defeated the Lake Michigan Admirals in the 2015 PBL Championship series. The victory secured the franchise's fifth Premier Basketball League championship and its sixth league title overall.

=== 2016 ===
In 2016, Rochester was able to turn around a disappointing 2–2 start by promoting long time assistant, Chris Iversen to the head coaching position. Iversen went undefeated for the remainder of the season, winning 16 straight regular season games, plus three postseason match-ups, finishing with a sweep of the Lake Michigan Admirals in the best of three PBL Championship Series. The 2016 title was the third straight PBL Championship for the RazorSharks, and their seventh total in team history.

=== Since 2018 ===
The team joined the new North American Premier Basketball for the 2018 season and planned to play in The Basketball League in 2019 before the team decided to sit out the season.

The RazorSharks announced in August 2019 that the team would return in a re-launched PBL for the 2020 season under the ownership of Mooreland Productions, LLC, a local entertainment company, and stated they will play in a new venue. That did not happen due to the COVID-19 pandemic. The ownership opened a new recreation center, Fast Break Sports, in Batavia, New York, for the team to play home games in late 2020, while the team also joined the Pro Basketball Association (PBA) for the 2021 season. The team also did not play that season.

On September 1, 2021, the team announced that it rebranded as the Fast Break Fury, but Mooreland Productions later issued a press release stating that there would be no rebranding, that the agreement with the RazorSharks would not be renewed, and the Fast Break Fury would be a separate franchise.

== Year-by-year results ==
The RazorSharks have made the championship series every year of their existence besides (2007). They boast a record of 7–3 in the championship.

Year	W-L	Season finish	Playoff finish	Average attendance
2005–06	26–4	1st ABA Blue	ABA Champions	3,241
2006–07	24–6	2nd ABA North	withdrew	4,177
2007–08	18–2	1st PBL East	PBL Champions	3,383
2008–09	17–3	1st PBL East	PBL Champions	4,044
2009–10	16–4	2nd PBL	Runner-up	4,699
2010–11	12–8	3rd PBL	PBL Champions	5,592
2011–12	17–2	1st PBL East	Runner-up	4,717
2012–13	17–2	1st PBL	Runner-up	2,220
2013–14	17–1	1st PBL East	PBL Champions	2,039
2014–15	15–0	1st PBL	PBL Champions	n/a
2015–16	18–2	1st PBL Northeast	PBL Champions	n/a
2016–17	12–2	1st PBL	PBL Champions	n/a
2017–18	11–18	7th NAPB	Did not qualify	n/a
2018–19	Did not participate			
2019–20	11–3	2nd PBL	Cancelled due to COVID-19 pandemic	n/a

== Retired numbers ==
Rochester RazorSharks retired numbers
No	Player	Position	Career	Number retirement
3	Lazarus Sims	G	2005–2007	January 24, 2008
13	Keith Friel	G	2005–2013	April 10, 2016
U2	Orest Hrywnak	Co-owner	2005–2014	January 29, 2017

== Coaches ==
Note: Statistics are correct through the end of the 2020 season.

#	Name	Term^{[b]}	GC	W	L	Win%	GC	W	L	Win%	Achievements/Notes
#	Name	Term^{[b]}	Regular season				Playoffs				Achievements/Notes
1	Rod Baker	2005–2012	184	148	36	.804	25	18	7	.720	4 championships, 3x Coach of the Year
2	Cliff Levingston	2013	19	16	3	.842	4	2	2	.500	
3	Lawrence Moten	2014	21	19	2	.944	3	2	1	.667	1 championship
4	Robert Spon	2015	17	17	0	1.000	2	2	0	1.000	1 championship, Coach of the Year
5	Chris Daleo	2016	4	2	2	.500	0	0	0	N/A	Fired mid-season
6	Chris Iversen	2016–2018	51	40	13	.754	7	6	1	.856	2 championships, 2x Coach of the Year, fired after 10 games in 2018 (2–8)
7	Clay Pittinaro	2018	18	9	9	.500	0	0	0	.000	Took over for Chris Iversen
8	Troy Jackson	2019–2020	2	2	0	1.000	0	0	0	.000	Fired beginning of season
9	Terry Nowden	2020–present	12	9	3	.75	0	0	0	.000	Season cancelled due to COVID-19 pandemic, 2nd seed in PBL when cancelled
All-time	All-time	2005–2018	296	242	56	.812	41	30	11	.732	8 Championships
