= Premier Basketball League =

American men's basketball minor league

- Sport: Basketball
- Founded: 2007–2017; 2020–present
- First season: 2008
- No. of teams: 10
- Country: United States
- Continent: FIBA Americas (Americas)
- Most recent champion: Lancaster Thunder (2022)
- Most titles: Rochester Razorsharks (7)

The Premier Basketball League (PBL) was an American professional men's basketball minor league that began play in January 2008. The league folded after the 2017 season. It was announced that the league would be revived under new management for the 2020 season. The league announced that the season would be put on hold due to the COVID-19 pandemic.

== History ==
=== 2008 season ===
The PBL was formed after a number of disagreements between several former member teams of the modern American Basketball Association (ABA) and ABA CEO Joe Newman. Eight of the initial ten PBL teams either played in or were slated to play in the ABA.

In early 2007, Newman was voted out of his position as CEO of the ABA by the board of directors, which included Maryland Nighthawks owner and then-ABA COO Tom Doyle (who was later a commissioner of the PBL), citing dissatisfaction with how Newman executed his duties as CEO, the large number of ABA teams that did not have the funds to operate, and high number of games when an ABA team did not show up. Newman responded by using his and other shares that formed a controlling interest to remove the entire board of directors.

Newman then refused to reschedule a weather-delayed playoff game between the Rochester RazorSharks and Wilmington Sea Dawgs although the two teams agreed to a make up date, wanting instead to force Rochester to accept a forfeit. It was on the heels of these two incidents that the Nighthawks and RazorSharks ownership groups decided to found the PBL. Dr. Sev Hrywnak, owner of the Rochester RazorSharks, invested close to $2 million to start the PBL. The business model was structured so that teams entering the initial season did not have to pay an entrance fee of $100,000 and that all travel would be covered by the League. This would allow new teams the opportunity to have financial success from the start.

Former Houston Rockets point guard and current NBA on TNT analyst Kenny Smith was the league's first commissioner.

=== 2009 season ===
During the 2008 off season, six more former ABA teams decided to move to the PBL. First, on May 9, the Manchester Millrats and the 2006–2007 and 2007–2008 ABA champion Vermont Frost Heaves moved. Then on May 20, the inactive Detroit Panthers re-activated and joined the league. And on May 21, the Quebec Kebs joined. On June 5 another team with an ABA history, the Augusta Groove, joined the league, but from the Continental Basketball Association. On June 23, the Halifax Rainmen, an ABA team the previous year, announced they were also joining the PBL. The first International Basketball League defection came on July 31 when the Battle Creek Knights joined the league. The Rochester RazorSharks went on to win their second straight PBL title after beating the Battle Creek Knights.

=== 2010 season ===
The Battle Creek Knights, the Wilmington Sea Dawgs and the Lawton-Fort Sill Cavalry would not return for the 2010 season. The Maryland Nighthawks changed the name of their franchise to the Maryland GreenHawks. The Puerto Rico Capitanes joined the league, performing concurrently in the Baloncesto Superior Nacional.

At the end of the season, the league officially severed ties with the Buffalo Stampede, citing a failure by the team to adhere to league standards. The Maryland GreenHawks were also dropped from the league. The Bluegrass Stallions, another ABA team located in Kentucky, joined. The league also added the expansion Dayton Air Strikers.

=== 2011 season ===
In January, the Vermont Frost Heaves abruptly announced the cessation of operations and their players were dispersed via a draft. The Rochester RazorSharks won the league championship.

=== 2012 season ===
The league approved expansion teams in Chicago and Scranton, Pennsylvania for the 2012 PBL season. Also, Chattanooga, Tennessee, Hershey, Pennsylvania, and Madison, Wisconsin were named as cities pending approval for expansion teams.

On 18 July 2011, the PBL announced the Dayton Air Strikers were returning to the league for the 2012 season. In addition, the Northwestern Illinois-based Sauk Valley Predators began their inaugural season in the PBL for 2012. On August 22, 2011, it was announced the Charleston Gunners would be the PBL's sixth team for the 2012 season. On September 15, 2011, it was announced the Northwest Indiana Stars were leaving the ABA to be the PBL's seventh team for the 2012 season. On 21 September 2011 it was announced the Lake Michigan Admirals were also leaving the ABA to be the PBL's eighth team for the 2012 season. On 23 September 2011 it was announced that the PBL's ninth team for the 2012 season would be the Central Illinois Drive based in Bloomington, Illinois. On October 12, 2011, it was announced that the Indiana Diesels were also leaving the ABA to be the PBL's tenth team for the 2012 season. On October 14, 2011, it was announced that the St. Louis Pioneers were also leaving the ABA to join the PBL, changing their name to the St. Louis Phoenix.

The Central Illinois Drive won the PBL championship for 2012, defeating the Rochester RazorSharks, 101–80. The Drive was 18–1 in regular season and 22–1 total.

=== 2013 season ===
During the off season the league announced it would be merging with the Independent Basketball Association to form the IBA-PBL. Prior to the start of the season, the defending champions, the Central Illinois Drive, ceased operations, but were then rebooted as the Bloomington Flex.

On 24 May 2013, the six PBL teams announced that the two leagues would cease interleague play, and that the leagues would hold separate playoffs. In the first round of the PBL playoffs, the Bloomington Flex beat the Indiana Diesels two games to none, and the Rochester RazorSharks beat the Sauk Valley Predators two games to none. In the finals, the Flex beat the RazorSharks two games to none to win their second consecutive title.

On 21 September 2013, the PBL announced the first of what is expected to be up to six expansion teams, with the Lima Express signing to play for the 2014 season, which will begin in January.

On 12 November 2013, the PBL announced the addition of the Pee Dee Vipers, an expansion team based in Florence, South Carolina. Three days later, the league announced that the Lake Michigan Admirals would return for 2014. On November 25, the PBL announced the addition of the Buffalo 716ers and the Erie Hurricane. In late November the Chicago Tide joined the league.

On 6 February 2014, it was announced that the newly formed Grand Rapids Cyclones would join the PBL.

=== 2014 season ===
Championship Series (Best 2 of 3)

Indiana Diesels (2) vs Rochester RazorSharks (1)

	Away		Home	
Game 1	Indiana	99	Rochester	100
Game 2	Rochester	99	Indiana	103
Game 3	Indiana	86	Rochester	110

Rochester wins PBL Championship series 2 games to 1

=== 2015 season ===
Several games in the 2015 season had to be postponed due to winter weather, leading to a rescheduling of games in March to ascertain that every team in the league would have played at least 15 games before the playoffs. The best-of-three finals-only playoffs between Midwest Division Champions Lake Michigan Admirals and East Division Champions Rochester RazorSharks opened on March 21 in Waterlivet, Michigan, with game two set for March 28 in Rochester. The Rochester RazorSharks won the 2015 PBL Championship, winning the first two games in a best-of three series against the Lake Michigan Admirals.

Championship Series (Best 2 of 3)

Lake Michigan Admirals (2) vs Rochester RazorSharks (1)

	Away		Home	
Game 1	Rochester	122	Lake Michigan	97
Game 2	Lake Michigan	118	Rochester	135

Rochester wins PBL Championship series 2 games to 0

=== 2016 season ===
Many new franchise additions occurred in the 2015 off-season including the Jamestown Jackals, Kentucky Mavericks, Western New York Thundersnow, and the return of the Danville Riverhawks. Mavericks owner Jerry Nelson also become an equity partner in the PBL. In addition, the PBL gained a new Southeast Conference which includes six members of the Tobacco Road Basketball League: Cary Invasion, Charlotte Elite, Durham Legacy, Huntersville HoopForLyfe, Raleigh Revolt, and the Wilmington Sea Dawgs.

Championship Series (Best 2 of 3)

Lake Michigan Admirals (3) vs Rochester RazorSharks (1)

	Away		Home	
Game 1	Rochester	97	Lake Michigan	91
Game 2	Lake Michigan	92	Rochester	93

Rochester wins PBL Championship series 2 games to 0

=== 2017 season ===
Championship Series (Best 2 of 3)

Kentucky Mavericks (2) vs Rochester RazorSharks (1)

	Away		Home	
Game 1	Rochester	88	Kentucky	91
Game 2 (OT)	Kentucky	110	Rochester	112
Game 3	Kentucky	94	Rochester	95

Rochester wins PBL Championship series 2 games to 1

== Teams ==
Conference	Team	City	Arena	Founded	Joined	Head coach
East	Chautauqua Hurricane	Dunkirk, New York	Dunkirk High School	2015	2020	Sixto Rosario
East	Detroit Panthers	Redford, Michigan	Westfield Academy	2021	2022	
East	DuBois Dream	DuBois, Pennsylvania	DuBois Area Middle School	2016	2020	Rick Homer
East	Lancaster Thunder	Lancaster, Ohio	Ohio University – Lancaster	2019	2020	Jamelle Cornley
Midwest
Midwest	Chicago Ballers	Lockport, Illinois	Lockport Township High School	2021	2022	Romel Bryant
Midwest	Chicago Raptors	Chicago, Illinois		2021	2022	Tim Townsel
Midwest	Kind Soul Bobcats	La Grange, Illinois	McCook Athletic & Exposition	2021	2022	
Midwest	Shoreline Sea Wolves	Holland, Michigan	Harbor Lights Middle School	2021	2022	Wesley Burton

=== Future teams ===
Conference	Team	City	Arena	Capacity	Founded	Joined	Ownership
	PA Royal Kingz	Beaver County, Pennsylvania			2021		

== Champions ==
Year	Champion	Runner-up	Result
2008	Rochester RazorSharks	Arkansas Impact	142–112
2009	Rochester RazorSharks	Battle Creek Knights	152–115
2010	Lawton-Fort Sill Cavalry	Rochester RazorSharks	2–1 (best-of-three)
2011	Rochester RazorSharks	Lawton-Fort Sill Cavalry	2–1 (best-of-three)
2012	Central Illinois Drive	Rochester RazorSharks	2–0 (best-of-three)
2013	Bloomington Flex	Rochester RazorSharks	2–0 (best-of-three)
2014	Rochester RazorSharks	Indianapolis Diesels	2–1 (best-of-three)
2015	Rochester RazorSharks	Lake Michigan Admirals	2–0 (best-of-three)
2016	Rochester RazorSharks	Lake Michigan Admirals	2–0 (best-of-three)
2017	Rochester RazorSharks	Kentucky Mavericks	2–1 (best-of-three)
2020	Chautauqua Hurricane		
2021	Toledo Glass City		
2022	Lancaster Thunder	Chicago Ballers	114–110

== Awards ==
Season	MVP	Playoffs MVP	Coach of the Year
2008	Jeremy Bell, Arkansas Impact	Keith Friel, Rochester RazorSharks	Rod Baker, Rochester RazorSharks
2009	Keith Friel, Rochester RazorSharks	Keith Friel and Sammy Monroe, Rochester RazorSharks	Rod Baker, Rochester RazorSharks and Terry Sare, Battle Creek Knights
2010	DeAnthony Bowden, Lawton-Fort Sill Cavalry	Elvin Mims, Lawton-Fort Sill Cavalry	Micheal Ray Richardson, Lawton-Fort Sill Cavalr
2011	Quinnel Brown, Quebec Kebs	Melvin Council, Rochester RazorSharks	Rob Spon, Quebec Kebs
2012	Perry Petty, Central Illinois Drive	Perry Petty, Central Illinois Drive	A. J. Guyton, Central Illinois Drive
2013	Jemal Farmer, Bloomington Flex	Jemal Farmer, Bloomington Flex	A. J. Guyton, Bloomington Flex
2014	Bryant Austin, Lima Express	Jerice Crouch Rochester RazorSharks	Aaron Hogg, Indianapolis Diesels
2015	Courtney Blackmore, Lake Michigan Admirals	Corey Allmond and Jerice Crouch, Rochester RazorSharks	Rob Spon, Rochester RazorSharks
2016	TBA	Melvin Council, Rochester RazorSharks	TBA
2017	Corey Allmond, Rochester RazorSharks	Corey Allmond and Jerice Crouch, Rochester RazorSharks	Chris Iverson, Rochester RazorSharks

=== Sixth Man of the Year ===
- 2009: Alex Harper, Wilmington Sea Dawgs
- 2010: Melvin Council, Rochester RazorSharks
- 2011: Eddie Smith, Lawton-Fort Sill Cavalry
- 2012: Rodney Edgerson, Central Illinois Drive
- 2013: Darin Mency, Rochester RazorSharks
- 2014: John Hart, Indianapolis Diesels
- 2015: Kyle Meyer, Lima Express
- 2016: Melvin Council, Rochester RazorSharks

=== Defensive Player of the Year ===
- 2009: Jonas Pierre, Quebec Kebs and Al Stewart, Manchester Millrats
- 2010: Eric Crookshank, Halifax Rainmen
- 2011: Eric Crookshank, Halifax Rainmen
- 2012: Marcel Anderson, Chicago Muscle
- 2013: Nate Fuqua, Bloomington Flex
- 2014: Courtney Blackmore, Lake Michigan Admirals
- 2015: Troy Franklin, Lake Michigan Admirals

=== Rookie of the Year ===
- 2010: Eric Gilchrese, Manchester Millrats & Halifax Rainmen
- 2011: Todd McCoy, Rochester RazorSharks
- 2012:
- 2013: Josiah Whitehead, Bloomington Flex
- 2014: Jamaal Francis, Lynchburg Titans
- 2015: Josh Chichester, Grand Rapids Cyclones
- 2016: Michael Davenport, Jamestown Jackals
