= 1989 NCAA Division II men's soccer tournament =

1989 NCAA Division II Men's Soccer Championship
Tournament details
- Country: United States
- Teams: 12

Final positions
- Champions: New Hampshire College (1st)
- Runners-up: UNC Greensboro

Tournament statistics
- Matches played: 11
- Goals scored: 38 (3.45 per match)
- Top goal scorer(s): (United States) D Sweeney, Mercy (3) (United States) A Harlow, SNHU (3)

Awards
- Best player: Offense: (United States) A Harlow (SNHU); Defense: (United States) M Martin (SNHU)

The 1989 NCAA Division II Men's Soccer Championship was the 18th annual tournament held by the NCAA to determine the top men's Division II college soccer program in the United States.

New Hampshire College defeated UNC Greensboro in the final, 3–1, to win their first Division II national title. The Penmen (22-1-2) were coached by John Rootes.

The final match was played on December 3 in Greensboro, North Carolina.

== Bracket ==
First Round; *Campus sites
Mercy (NY)	2(6)
*	S. Connecticut	2(5)
Cal State Hayward	2
*	Cal Poly–SLO	1
*	Florida Tech	0
Tampa	2(OT)
Oakland	1
*	Gannon	2(OT)

Quarterfinals; *Campus sites
*	New Hampshire College	3
Mercy (NY)	2
*	Cal State Northridge	1
Cal State Hayward	4
*	UNC Greensboro	2
Tampa	1
East Stroudsburg	0
*	Gannon	1

Semifinals; *Campus sites
New Hampshire College	2
Cal State Hayward	0
*	UNC Greensboro	4
Gannon	2

Final; December 4 Greensboro, NC
New Hampshire College	3
UNC Greensboro	1

== Final ==
December 3, 1989

UNC Greensboro	1–3	New Hampshire College
Hilmar Björnsson 13:20'	Report	Ike Ofoje 7:06'; Archie Harlow 15:30', 85'

Greensboro, NC
Attendance: 2,137

== See also ==
- NCAA Division I Men's Soccer Championship
- NCAA Division III Men's Soccer Championship
- NAIA Men's Soccer Championship
