= 31 Gang =

- Founded: 2000s
- Named after: Harriet Ross Tubman School
- Years active: 2000s-Present
- Territory: Broadway-Fillmore
- Ethnicity: Mainly African American

31 Gang is a street gang based in East Buffalo, New York, that has small amounts of territory in Willert Park and Broadway-Fillmore.

== History ==
The gang was established in the early 2000s in the lower East-Side of Buffalo, naming themselves after the ID number of the Harriet Ross Tubman School associated with the Buffalo Public Schools, 31 and the founders and most of the members of the gang would have had to have attended that school which is located on Stanton Street, technically away from the gang's territory.

Two members, Adrian of the 31 Gang faced 40 years to life in prison after being caught with numerous kilograms of cocaine and crack cocaine throughout 2008 and 2009 and sold these drugs in the Broadway-Fillmore area of Buffalo in Coit Street, William Street, and Fillmore Avenue. One of these members, Glance Ross, was the leader of the gang.

In 2009 during a drug raid against 31 Gang members, an FBI agent was shot and wounded. One of these gang members who were arrested were Damone Brown, a Buffalo native who played for the Reno Bighorns, he was associated with a cocaine trafficking ring from Reno, Nevada and Buffalo, New York.
