= The Singing Cop =

The Singing Cop may refer to:

- The Singing Cop (film), a British film directed by Arthur B. Woods
- Daniel Rodríguez (born 1964), American singer known at The Singing Cop
- Michael Norwood and Armonde "Mo" Badger, known as The Singing Cops
