= Buffalo Stampede =

Basketball team in New York, 2009–2011

- Founded: 2009; 17 years ago
- Folded: 2011; 15 years ago
- League: PBL; 2009–2010; ACPBL; 2010–2011
- Team history: NexxNow Dragons; 2008; Buffalo Dragons; 2008; Buffalo Stampede; 2009–2011
- Based in: Buffalo, New York
- Arena: Koessler Athletic Center; 2009–2010; Daemen College; 2010–2011
- Colors: Orange, black, white
- Owner: Todd Wier; 2008; Vincent Lesh; 2009–2011
- Head coach: Richard Jacob; 2008; John Fitzpatrick; 2009; Aaron Clark (interim); 2009; Jim Condill; 2010; Vern Hall & Jordan Ellis; 2010; Herb Richmond; 2010–2011
- General manager: Richard Jacob; 2008; Roosevelt Bouie; 2009–2011
- Captain: Mark Price; 2010
- Overall record: 11–43 (.204)
- Dancers: Stampede Dancers; 2009

The Buffalo Stampede were a basketball team based in Buffalo, New York. The team competed in the Premier Basketball League (PBL) for two seasons in 2009 and 2010, and in the Atlantic Coast Professional Basketball League (ACPBL) for the 2010–11 season before suspending operations.

== History ==
=== 2008: Franchise acquisition and sale ===
Todd Wier had previously co-owned the Buffalo Silverbacks franchise of the American Basketball Association with Dan Robbie from 2005 to 2007. They sold that team to local concert promoter Vincent Lesh in September 2007, having lost $700,000 in their two seasons of ownership.

In Wier's final season of ownership, the Silverbacks were eliminated from the 2006–07 ABA playoffs by the Beijing Aoshen Olympians, a traveling team from China who played their games at Felix Events Center in Azusa, California. He was intrigued by the Olympians, as their games were broadcast live on CCTV-5 in China and watched by an average of 15 million people.

Wier sought to duplicate the success of the Olympians with the Buffalo Dragons, a team which would be based in Buffalo, New York and feature predominantly Chinese players. The team, also referred to as the NexxNow Dragons, was unveiled in April 2008 as an expansion franchise of the Premier Basketball League that would play at Burt Flickinger Center for the 2009 season. However, Wier was unable to secure a television contract with the Chinese government through his NexxNow shell corporation, and the project became financially unsustainable.

Vincent Lesh abandoned his plans to relaunch the Silverbacks as the Buffalo Sharks, and instead purchased the Dragons franchise from Wier in September 2008, renaming it the Buffalo Stampede. The staff and players Lesh had recruited for the Sharks were brought over to the Stampede, including Richard Jacob as both head coach and general manager. Roosevelt Bouie was announced as assistant coach in October 2008.

=== 2009: Inaugural season and instability ===
Head coach and general manager Richard Jacob resigned two weeks prior to the inaugural season, along with assistant coach Bob Bateson. John Fitzpatrick was hired to replace Jacob as head coach, with Roosevelt Bouie promoted to general manager.

The team played the 2009 PBL season in the Eastern Division, with home games at Koessler Athletic Center. Their inaugural game was a 98–95 home victory over the Wilmington Sea Dawgs in front of 650 fans on January 3, 2009.

Players and coaches reported problems with Vincent Lesh making payroll, resulting in a high turnover rate.

Fitzpatrick was fired in March 2009 after the team started 1–16, with assistant coach Aaron Clark promoted to interim head coach for the remainder of the season. The team finished with a 1–19 record and failed to make the playoffs.

Tyrone Rayson was named to the 2009 All-PBL Team after leading the club in scoring and rebounding.

=== 2010: Second season and dismissal from PBL ===
Jim Condill was hired as the team's new head coach for their second season. Local players were signed in an effort to increase home attendance at Koessler Athletic Center, including Damone Brown and Frank Turner.

Derick Payne was named PBL Player of the Week after scoring 25 points to end the team's 22 game losing streak in their 124–114 victory over the Maryland GreenHawks on January 16, 2010.

After falling ill during a team road trip to play the Puerto Rico Capitanes, Jim Condill resigned as head coach in February 2010. Vern Hall was promoted from assistant coach as his replacement for the remainder of the season, with assistant coach Jordan Ellis filling in for Hall when needed.

The team finished with a 3–17 record and failed to make the playoffs. Kenneth Massey ranked the team 7th overall out of 9 teams in his final PBL ratings of the season.

Corey Herring and Kevin Ross were named to the 2010 PBL All-Star Team after Herring led the club in scoring, and Ross led the club in rebounding. Herring was also named to the 2010 All-PBL team for his performance during the season.

The Premier Basketball League removed the team in May 2010, citing its failure to meet the league's operational standards.

=== 2010–2011: Final season in ACPBL ===
The team joined the Atlantic Coast Professional Basketball League for their third season in August 2010. Herb Richmond was hired as the team's new head coach in October 2010.

Daemen College was chosen as the team's new venue, and their season opener was a 132–114 home victory against the Hudson Valley Kingz on December 4, 2010.

At mid-point of the 2010–11 season, the Stampede were tied for first place with a 5–2 record. However, the team lost five of their last seven games, finishing with a 7–7 record and failing to make the playoffs.

Charles Walker, Greg Gamble and Marcus Hall were named to the 2011 ACPBL All-Star Team and the 2011 All-ACPBL Team.

The Stampede ceased operations and was replaced in the ACPBL by the Buffalo Warriors, a team that folded midway through the 2011–12 season. Warriors owner Franklin Jackson would go on to found the Buffalo Blue Hawks.

== Personnel ==
=== 2009 ===
Buffalo Stampede roster
Players

| Pos. | No. | Player | Height | Weight | DOB | From |
|---|---|---|---|---|---|---|
| PG | 10 | Ernest Jones | 6 ft 0 in (1.83 m) | 180 lb (82 kg) | 1981-08-20 | Florida State |
| PF | 19 | Michael Norwood | 6 ft 7 in (2.01 m) | 227 lb (103 kg) | 1985-07-06 | Coppin |
| SF | 11 | Derick Payne | 6 ft 7 in (2.01 m) | 230 lb (104 kg) | 1983-01-08 | Bowie State |
| PG | 3 | Mark Price | 6 ft 2 in (1.88 m) | 190 lb (86 kg) | 1980-08-02 | Siena |
| PF | 42 | Tyrone Rayson | 6 ft 6 in (1.98 m) | 220 lb (100 kg) | 1980-07-31 | East Central |
| SG | 1 | Chuck Reed | 6 ft 3 in (1.91 m) | 205 lb (93 kg) | 1983-10-03 | Park |
| C | 25 | Kevin Ross | 6 ft 9 in (2.06 m) | 240 lb (109 kg) | 1979-07-08 | Cleveland State |
| PG | 7 | Ricky Yahn | 6 ft 4 in (1.93 m) | 190 lb (86 kg) | ????-??-?? | Wheeling Jesuit |
| C | 33 | Adam Yeoman | 6 ft 9 in (2.06 m) | 255 lb (116 kg) | 1987-05-07 | Genesee CC |

Coaches
Head coach
- Aaron Clark (interim)

Legend
- (DP) Unsigned draft pick
- (FA) Free agent
- (S) Suspended
- Injured

Roster
Updated: March 28, 2009

=== 2010 ===
Buffalo Stampede roster
Players

| Pos. | No. | Player | Height | Weight | DOB | From |
|---|---|---|---|---|---|---|
| G | 24 | Jonathan Battle | 6 ft 1 in (1.85 m) | 215 lb (98 kg) | 1985-??-?? | Madonna |
| G | 10 | Greg Gamble | 6 ft 3 in (1.91 m) | 200 lb (91 kg) | 1987-04-11 | SUNY Buffalo |
| SF | 19 | Marcus Hall | 6 ft 5 in (1.96 m) | 195 lb (88 kg) | ????-??-?? | Robert Morris |
| C | 42 | Aaron Harrison | 6 ft 10 in (2.08 m) | 285 lb (129 kg) | 1983-04-11 | OPSU |
| G/F | 23 | Corey Herring | 6 ft 5 in (1.96 m) | 208 lb (94 kg) | 1983-07-03 | Canisius |
| G/F | 13 | Michael Norwood | 6 ft 7 in (2.01 m) | 240 lb (109 kg) | 1985-07-06 | Coppin |
| PF | 11 | Derick Payne | 6 ft 6 in (1.98 m) | 220 lb (100 kg) | 1983-01-08 | Bowie State |
| G | 3 | Mark Price (C) | 6 ft 2 in (1.88 m) | 195 lb (88 kg) | 1980-08-02 | Siena |
| G | 1 | Andy Robinson | 6 ft 2 in (1.88 m) | 195 lb (88 kg) | 1987-07-15 | SUNY Buffalo |
| PF | 25 | Kevin Ross | 6 ft 8 in (2.03 m) | 240 lb (109 kg) | 1979-07-08 | Cleveland State |
| G | 7 | Antoine Sims | 5 ft 10 in (1.78 m) | 175 lb (79 kg) | 1977-05-?? | Johnson C. Smith |
| G/F | 15 | Charles Walker | 6 ft 4 in (1.93 m) | 180 lb (82 kg) | ????-??-?? | D'Youville |

Coaches
Head coach
- Jim Condill
Assistant(s)
- Vern Hall
- Jordan Ellis

Legend
- (DP) Unsigned draft pick
- (FA) Free agent
- (S) Suspended
- Injured

Roster
Updated: January 6, 2010

== Season-by-season record ==
| League champions | Conference champions | Division champions | Playoff berth |

| Season | Conference | Finish | Division | Finish | Wins | Losses | Win% | GB | Playoffs | Awards | Head coach | Ref. |
|---|---|---|---|---|---|---|---|---|---|---|---|---|
| 2009 | — | — | Eastern | 4th | 1 | 19 | .050 | — | Did not qualify. | Tyrone Rayson (All-PBL) | John Fitzpatrick; Aaron Clark | |
| 2010 | — | — | — | — | 3 | 17 | .150 | — | Did not qualify. | Corey Herring (All-Star, All-PBL); Kevin Ross (All-Star) | Jim Condill; Vern Hall; Jordan Ellis | |
| 2010–11 | North | 3rd | — | — | 7 | 7 | .500 | — | Did not qualify. | Charles Walker (All-Star, All-ACPBL); Greg Gamble (All-Star, All-ACPBL); Marcus Hall (All-Star, All-ACPBL) | Herb Richmond | |

== Game log ==
=== 2009 ===
==== Regular season ====
2008–09 game log
Total: 1–19 (Home: 1–9; Road: 0–10)
January: 1–6 (home: 1–2; road: 0–4)

| Game | Date | Team | Score | High points | High rebounds | High assists | Location Attendance | Record |
|---|---|---|---|---|---|---|---|---|
| 1 | January 3 | Wilmington | W 98–95 | Edmund Rainey (22) | Kyle Cuffe (6); Tyrone Rayson (6) | Charles Easterling (4); Nick Perioli (4) | Koessler Athletic Center | 1–0 |
| 2 | January 10 | @ Rochester | L 100–120 | Tyrone Rayson (22) | Tyrone Rayson (9) | Lamar Castile (6); Mark Price (6) | Blue Cross Arena | 1–1 |
| 3 | January 17 | @ Augusta | L 124–135 | Lamar Castile (26) | Kyle Cuffe (11) | Kyle Cuffe (1); Lamar Castile (1) | Richmond Academy | 1–2 |
| 4 | January 18 | @ Wilmington | L 95–103 | Edmund Rainey (24) | Michael Norwood (10) | Mark Price (2) | Schwartz Center | 1–3 |
| 5 | January 24 | Halifax | L 108–112 | Tyrone Rayson (24) | Tyrone Rayson (15) | Mark Price (10) | Koessler Athletic Center | 1–4 |
| 6 | January 25 | @ Halifax | L 94–105 | Tyrone Rayson (29) | Kyle Cuffe (8); Tyrone Rayson (8) | Anthony Slater (6) | Halifax Metro Centre | 1–5 |
| 7 | January 31 | Wilmington | L 82–92 | Tyrone Rayson (24) | Dain Swetalla (16) | Mark Price (7) | Koessler Athletic Center | 1–6 |

February: 0–5 (home: 0–3; road: 0–2)

| Game | Date | Team | Score | High points | High rebounds | High assists | Location Attendance | Record |
|---|---|---|---|---|---|---|---|---|
| 8 | February 6 | @ Manchester | L 107–116 | Karl Rainey (43) | Tyrone Rayson (14) | Mark Price (5) | SNHU Fieldhouse | 1–7 |
| 9 | February 7 | Vermont | L 91–119 | Mark Price (21) | Tyrone Rayson (9) | Mark Price (6) | Koessler Athletic Center | 1–8 |
| 10 | February 14 | Augusta | L 119–129 | Tyrone Rayson (30) | Tyrone Rayson (14) | Chuck Reed (13) | Koessler Athletic Center | 1–9 |
| 11 | February 21 | Manchester | L 93–114 | Tyrone Rayson (23) | Kevin Ross (10) | Chuck Reed (8) | Koessler Athletic Center | 1–10 |
| 12 | February 27 | @ Battle Creek | L 90–114 | Tyrone Rayson (18) | Kevin Ross (10) | Dereck Payne (2); Mark Price (2) | Kellogg Arena | 1–11 |

March: 0–8 (home: 0–4; road: 0–4)

| Game | Date | Team | Score | High points | High rebounds | High assists | Location Attendance | Record |
|---|---|---|---|---|---|---|---|---|
| 13 | March 7 | @ Augusta | L 113–126 | Mark Price (24) | Tyrone Rayson (8) | Chuck Reed (2); Michael Norwood (2) | Richmond Academy | 1–12 |
| 14 | March 8 | @ Wilmington | L 96–122 | Tyrone Rayson (25) | Tyrone Rayson (19) | Mark Price (4) | Schwartz Center | 1–13 |
| 15 | March 14 | Halifax | L 94–96 | Derick Payne (24) | Tyrone Rayson (12) | Mark Price (11) | Koessler Athletic Center | 1–14 |
| 16 | March 15 | @ Vermont | L 94–120 | Tyrone Rayson (28) | Derick Payne (10) | Ricky Yahn (4) | Barre Auditorium | 1–15 |
| 17 | March 20 | Rochester | L 100–132 | Tyrone Rayson (31) | Derick Payne (6) | Chuck Reed (12) | Koessler Athletic Center | 1–16 |
| 18 | March 22 | @ Rochester | L 111–156 | Tyrone Rayson (30) | Tyrone Rayson (11) | Chuck Reed (5) | Blue Cross Arena | 1–17 |
| 19 | March 27 | Rochester | L 92–123 | Tyrone Rayson (37) | Tyrone Rayson (11) | Ernest Jones (8) | Koessler Athletic Center | 1–18 |
| 20 | March 28 | Battle Creek | L 106–109 | Tyrone Rayson (37) | Derick Payne (15) | Chuck Reed (12) | Koessler Athletic Center | 1–19 |

=== 2010 ===
==== Regular season ====
2009–10 game log
Total: 3–17 (Home: 1–9; Road: 2–8)
January: 2–5 (home: 1–2; road: 1–3)

| Game | Date | Team | Score | High points | High rebounds | High assists | Location Attendance | Record |
|---|---|---|---|---|---|---|---|---|
| 1 | January 2 | @ Quebec | L 85–100 | | | | PEPS | 0–1 |
| 2 | January 9 | Rochester | L 104–133 | Derick Payne (27) | | Mark Price (7) | Koessler Athletic Center | 0–2 |
| 3 | January 10 | Maryland | L 87–101 | Andy Robinson (22) | | | Koessler Athletic Center | 0–3 |
| 4 | January 16 | @ Maryland | W 124–114 | Derick Payne (25) | | Mark Price (9) | Thomas S. Wootton Athletic Center | 1–3 |
| 5 | January 23 | @ Rochester | L 110–131 | Cameron Stanley (25) | Kevin Ross (10) | | Blue Cross Arena | 1–4 |
| 6 | January 25 | @ Puerto Rico | L 89–114 | | | | Coliseo Manuel Iguina | 1–5 |
| 7 | January 30 | Manchester | W 114–111 | Mark Price (22) | Kevin Ross (13) | | Koessler Athletic Center | 2–5 |

February: 1–4 (home: 0–3; road: 1–1)

| Game | Date | Team | Score | High points | High rebounds | High assists | Location Attendance | Record |
|---|---|---|---|---|---|---|---|---|
| 8 | February 6 | @ Quebec | W 119–103 | Kevin Ross (24) | Kevin Ross (12) | | PEPS | 3–5 |
| 9 | February 7 | @ Halifax | L 90–111 | Andy Robinson (29) | Greg Gamble (11); Kevin Ross (11) | | Halifax Metro Centre | 3–6 |
| 10 | February 13 | Vermont | L 90–99 | Andy Robinson (22) | Damone Brown (14) | | Koessler Athletic Center | 3–7 |
| 11 | February 21 | @ Lawton | L 80–139 | Andy Robinson (26) | | | Great Plains Coliseum | 3–8 |
| 12 | February 27 | @ Rochester | L 91–105 | Andy Robinson (19) | | | Blue Cross Arena | 3–9 |

March: 0–6 (home: 0–4; road: 0–2)

| Game | Date | Team | Score | High points | High rebounds | High assists | Location Attendance | Record |
|---|---|---|---|---|---|---|---|---|
| 13 | March 6 | @ Vermont | L 90–126 | | | | Burlington Memorial Auditorium | 3–10 |
| 14 | March 12 | Puerto Rico | L 85–111 | | | | Koessler Athletic Center | 3–11 |
| 15 | March 13 | Lawton | L 96–164 | | | | Koessler Athletic Center | 3–12 |
| 16 | March 18 | Rochester | L 109–120 | Frank Turner (21) | Michael Norwood (10) | Frank Turner (11) | Koessler Athletic Center | 3–13 |
| 17 | March 20 | @ Manchester | L 108–145 | | | | SNHU Fieldhouse | 3–14 |
| 18 | March 27 | Quebec | L 94–127 | Michael Norwood (20) | Corey Herring (9) | Corey Herring (8) | Koessler Athletic Center | 3–15 |

April: 0–2 (home: 0–2; road: 0–0)

| Game | Date | Team | Score | High points | High rebounds | High assists | Location Attendance | Record |
|---|---|---|---|---|---|---|---|---|
| 19 | April 3 | Halifax | L 105–124 | Corey Herring (34) | | | Koessler Athletic Center | 3–16 |
| 20 | April 10 | Lawton | L 101–156 | Corey Herring (23) | Corey Herring (9) | | Koessler Athletic Center | 3–17 |

=== 2010–2011 ===
==== Regular season ====
2010–11 game log
Total: 7–7 (Home: 6–4; Road: 1–3)
December: 2–1 (home: 2–1; road: 0–0)

| Game | Date | Team | Score | High points | High rebounds | High assists | Location Attendance | Record |
|---|---|---|---|---|---|---|---|---|
| 1 | December 4 | Hudson Valley | W 132–114 | Marcus Hall (27) | Marcus Hall (7) | | Daemen College | 1–0 |
| 2 | December 11 | Garden State | W 103–100 | Charles Walker (23) | | Charles Walker (8) | Daemen College | 2–0 |
| 3 | December 18 | Hudson Valley | L 92–110 | | | | Daemen College | 2–1 |

January: 3–1 (home: 2–1; road: 1–0)

| Game | Date | Team | Score | High points | High rebounds | High assists | Location Attendance | Record |
|---|---|---|---|---|---|---|---|---|
| 4 | January 8 | New York | W 90–75 | | | | Daemen College | 3–1 |
| 5 | January 15 | Garden State | L 84–90 | | | | Daemen College | 3–2 |
| 6 | January 22 | @ Westchester | W 114–104 | | | | | 4–2 |
| 7 | January 29 | Hudson Valley | W 84–79 | Chris Gadley (21) | Chris Gadley (8) | | Daemen College | 5–2 |

February: 1–3 (home: 1–1; road: 0–2)

| Game | Date | Team | Score | High points | High rebounds | High assists | Location Attendance | Record |
|---|---|---|---|---|---|---|---|---|
| 8 | February 5 | @ Garden State | L 78–99 | | | | | 5–3 |
| 9 | February 12 | Hudson Valley | W 104–102 | | | | Daemen College | 6–3 |
| 10 | February 19 | New York | L 113–122 | | | | Daemen College | 6–4 |
| 11 | February 26 | @ New York | L 108–124 | | | | | 6–5 |

March: 1–2 (home: 1–1; road: 0–1)

| Game | Date | Team | Score | High points | High rebounds | High assists | Location Attendance | Record |
|---|---|---|---|---|---|---|---|---|
| 12 | March 5 | New York | L 91–105 | | | | Daemen College | 6–6 |
| 13 | March 12 | Hudson Valley | W 106–100 | | | | Daemen College | 7–6 |
| 14 | March 19 | @ Garden State | L | | | | | 7–7 |

== Player statistics ==
=== 2010 ===
Legend
| GP | Games played | GS | Games started | MPG | Minutes per game |
| FG% | Field-goal percentage | 3P% | 3-point field-goal percentage | FT% | Free-throw percentage |
| RPG | Rebounds per game | APG | Assists per game | SPG | Steals per game |
| BPG | Blocks per game | PPG | Points per game |

After all games.

Buffalo Stampede statistics
| Player | GP | GS | MPG | FG% | 3P% | FT% | RPG | APG | SPG | BPG | PPG |
|---|---|---|---|---|---|---|---|---|---|---|---|
| Greg Gamble | 10 | – | 25.1 | .571 | .000 | .667 | 4.7 | 3.9 | 0.9 | 0.0 | 8.6 |
| Marcus Hall | 18 | – | 11.6 | .424 | .154 | .667 | 2.7 | 0.6 | 0.5 | 0.3 | 2.9 |
| Aaron Harrison | 13 | – | 22.1 | .472 | – | .500 | 4.9 | 0.7 | 0.3 | 0.2 | 7.4 |
| Corey Herring | 19 | – | 31.0 | .469 | .342 | .823 | 6.3 | 2.6 | 1.2 | 0.1 | 16.4 |
| Michael Norwood | 15 | – | 27.4 | .469 | .000 | .543 | 5.4 | 0.7 | 0.5 | 0.1 | 12.2 |
| Mark Price | 14 | – | 33.1 | .418 | .327 | .690 | 1.6 | 4.6 | 1.0 | 0.0 | 12.4 |
| Andy Robinson | 12 | – | 34.2 | .455 | .460 | .746 | 4.1 | 4.0 | 2.2 | 0.4 | 19.5 |
| Kevin Ross | 16 | – | 30.9 | .432 | – | .551 | 8.1 | 1.9 | 0.4 | 0.2 | 12.2 |
| Garrett Schmidt | 10 | – | 11.9 | .464 | .000 | .478 | 2.0 | 0.0 | 0.1 | 0.1 | 3.7 |
| Charles Walker | 18 | – | 15.1 | .386 | .323 | .778 | 1.0 | 1.0 | 0.7 | 0.1 | 6.2 |

^{‡}Waived during the season
^{†}Traded during the season
^{≠}Acquired during the season
