= SNHU Penmen =

Southern New Hampshire Penmen
- University: Southern New Hampshire University
- Nickname: Penmen
- NCAA: Division II
- Conference: Northeast-10 Conference (primary)
- Athletic director: Tricia Cote (interim)
- Location: Manchester, NH
- Varsity teams: 19
- Basketball arena: Stan Spirou Field House
- Ice hockey arena: Ice Den
- Baseball stadium: SNHU Baseball Field
- Softball stadium: SNHU Softball Field
- Soccer stadium: Penmen Stadium
- Lacrosse stadium: Penmen Stadium
- Golf course: Lake Sunapee Country Club; Concord Country Club
- Tennis venue: SNHU Tennis Courts
- Colors: Blue and gold
- Mascot: Petey Penmen
- Website: snhupenmen.com/index.aspx
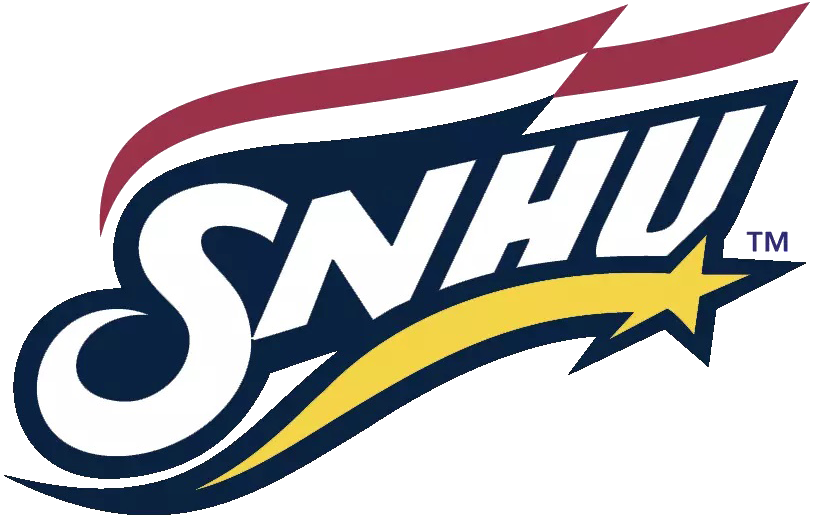

Team NCAA championships
- 2

At Southern New Hampshire Penmen (formerly the New Hampshire College Penmen and unofficially the SNHU Penmen) are the athletic teams that represent Southern New Hampshire University, located in Manchester, New Hampshire, in NCAA Division II intercollegiate sports.

The Penmen are full members of the Northeast-10 Conference (NE-10), the home of all nineteen of its athletics programs.

== History ==
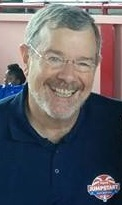
P. J. Carlesimo was head coach of the men's basketball team throughout the 1975–1976 season.

Lou D'Allesandro was appointed the first athletic director and head coach of the men's basketball team in 1963. Future NBA head coach P.J. Carlesimo coached the men's basketball team during the 1975–1976 season, compiling a 14–13 record and winning the Mayflower Conference championship.

The Stan Spirou Field House is named after longtime men's basketball coach Stan Spirou, whose career spanned from 1985 to 2018. He is considered one of the most successful NCAA Division II basketball coaches, compiling a career winning percentage of .652 (522–279), four New England Collegiate Conference Coach of the Year awards (1993, 1994, 1995, 1999), and was named National Coach of the Year in 1994 by Division II Bulletin. His teams have averaged 22 wins per season and also have 14 NCAA tournament appearances, four NCAA regional titles, and six NECC tournament championships.

=== Conferences ===
- New England Collegiate Conference (1981–2000)
- Northeast-10 Conference (2000–present)

== Varsity sports ==
=== Teams ===
Men's sports (8)

- Baseball
- Basketball
- Cross country
- Golf
- Ice hockey
- Lacrosse
- Soccer
- Tennis

Women's sports (11)

- Basketball
- Cheerleading
- Cross country
- Field hockey
- Lacrosse
- Soccer
- Softball
- Tennis
- Track and field
- Volleyball

== National championships ==
=== Team ===
Sport	Association	Division	Year	Opponent	Score
Men's soccer (2)	NCAA	Division II	1989	UNC Greensboro	3-1
Men's soccer (2)	NCAA	Division II	2013	Carson–Newman	2–1

== Individual teams ==
=== Soccer ===
In 1989, when it was known as New Hampshire College, the Penmen won their first NCAA Men's Soccer Championship, against UNC Greensboro. In 2002, the men's soccer team returned to the NCAA Division II championship game, but lost to Sonoma State. On December 7, 2013, the Penmen won their second NCAA men's soccer national title, defeating Carson-Newman, 2–1.
