= John Rootes =

American college soccer coach

Current position
- Title: Head coach
- Team: Lynn
- Conference: Sunshine State Conference
- Record: 194–54–31 (.751) at Lynn

Playing career
- ?: Philadelphia College of Textiles & Sciences (now Thomas Jefferson University)
- ?: UNLV
- 1994–1995: Boston Storm
- Position: Forward / Striker

Coaching career (HC unless noted)
- ?: Clemson (assistant)
- 1988–1997: Southern New Hampshire
- 1997–2003: Clayton State
- 2004–2008: SCAD
- 2008–present: Lynn

Head coaching record
- Overall: 498–150–55 (career)

Accomplishments and honors

Championships
- NCAA Division II (4): 1989 (Southern New Hampshire), 2012, 2014, 2024 (Lynn); Sunshine State Conference regular season (5); Sunshine State Conference tournament (3)

Awards
- United Soccer Coaches National Staff of the Year (2024); Sunshine State Conference Coach of the Year (2014, 2019); Multiple SSC Coach of the Year recognitions; Inducted into Southern New Hampshire University Hall of Fame (2008)

John Rootes is an American college soccer coach who is currently the head coach of the Lynn Fighting Knights men's soccer team at Lynn University in Boca Raton, Florida. He has led the program to three NCAA Division II national championships (2012, 2014, 2024).

== Playing career ==
Rootes was a four-year starter as a forward under coach Barry Barto at Philadelphia College of Textiles & Sciences (now Thomas Jefferson University) and the UNLV. He helped lead Textile to an undefeated season and a No. 1 national ranking in the final coaches’ poll in 1980 and guided UNLV to its first NCAA Tournament appearance in 1983. He was twice named an NSCAA All-West selection (as a striker) and played for the 1984 United States Amateur national team. Rootes also played professionally for two seasons (1994–1995) with the Boston Storm.

== Coaching career ==
=== Clemson University (assistant coach) ===
Rootes began his coaching career as a senior assistant coach at Clemson University under head coach I.M. Ibrahim. During his tenure, he helped the Tigers win the 1987 NCAA Division I Men's Soccer Championship and the 1988 World Collegiate Championship. He fondly recalled the 1987 season, as his brother Jamey was an All-ACC midfielder on the team.

=== Southern New Hampshire University (head coach, 1988–1997) ===
Rootes then served as head coach at Southern New Hampshire University (then known as New Hampshire College) from 1988 to 1997, compiling a 169–30–10 record over 10 seasons. His teams were consistently ranked in the Intercollegiate Soccer Association of America National Top 10, earned six NCAA Division II Tournament bids, four Elite Eight appearances, three 20-win seasons, and captured the 1989 NCAA Division II national championship (with a 22–1–2 record that season). Nine players earned NSCAA All-American honors, and 15 advanced to professional careers. Rootes was inducted into the Southern New Hampshire University Hall of Fame in 2008.

=== Clayton State University (head coach, 1998–2003) ===
From 1998 to 2003, Rootes was head coach at Clayton State University for six years. He turned around a program that had only two winning seasons prior to his arrival, posting a 69–38–9 (.634) record overall. The Lakers won two conference championships and earned two NCAA Tournament bids, including an 18–3–1 mark, the program's first Peach Belt Championship, and NCAA Regional appearance in his third year.

=== Savannah College of Art and Design (head coach, 2004–2008) ===
Rootes next coached at Savannah College of Art and Design (SCAD) for approximately four years achieving a 47–26–2 (.627) record and averaging over 14 wins per season. He led the Bees to NAIA Region XIV Tournament finals in three consecutive seasons, set a program win record (13–4–1) in his second year, earned the program's first national ranking (as high as No. 18), and secured multiple postseason appearances.

=== Lynn University (head coach, 2008–present) ===
Rootes was named head coach of the Lynn Fighting Knights men's soccer program on March 31, 2008.

His tenure includes three NCAA Division II national championships (2012, 2014, and 2024), with the 2024 title coming in an undefeated 20–0–2 season. The team has made 10 NCAA Tournament appearances, reached the national title game four times, won multiple Sunshine State Conference regular-season and tournament titles, and produced 26 All-Americans, 133 All-SSC selections, and six SSC Players of the Year. In 2024, Rootes and assistant coach Anthony Desperito were named United Soccer Coaches National Staff of the Year.

=== Career record ===
As of January 2026, Rootes' career record stands at 498–150–55, with his Lynn record at 194–54–31 (.751).

== Other ==
Rootes is a U.S. Soccer Federation "A" license holder.
