= Damone Brown =

American basketball player (born 1979)

Personal information
- Born: June 28, 1979 (age 47) Buffalo, New York, U.S.
- Listed height: 6 ft 9 in (2.06 m)
- Listed weight: 212 lb (96 kg)

Career information
- High school: Seneca Vocational (Buffalo, New York)
- College: Syracuse (1997–2001)
- NBA draft: 2001: 2nd round, 36th overall pick
- Drafted by: Philadelphia 76ers
- Playing career: 2001–2013
- Position: Power forward / small forward
- Number: 25, 54, 31, 10
- Coaching career: 2015–present

Career history

Playing
- 2001–2002: Philadelphia 76ers
- 2002–2004: North Charleston / Charleston Lowgators
- 2003: Toronto Raptors
- 2003: New Jersey Nets
- 2004–2005: Huntsville Flight
- 2005: Washington Wizards
- 2005–2006: Seoul SK Knights
- 2006: OSG Phoenix
- 2007: Sioux Falls Skyforce
- 2007–2008: EiffelTowers Den Bosch
- 2008–2009: Reno Bighorns
- 2010: Buffalo Stampede
- 2011: Fuerza Guinda de Nogales
- 2011–2012: Huracanes de Tampico
- 2012: Guaros de Lara
- 2012–2013: Jacksonville Giants

Coaching
- 2015–2018: Villa Maria (assistant)
- 2018–present: BSC Buffalo

Career highlights
- ABA champion (2013); All-NBDL Second Team (2005)
- Stats at NBA.com
- Stats at Basketball Reference

Damone Lamar Brown (born June 28, 1979) is an American former professional basketball player, and current head coach for the Bryant & Stratton Buffalo Bobcats of USCAA.

== Playing career ==
Brown was listed at 6'9" and 212 lb, and played the forward position. After playing college basketball at Syracuse University, he was selected by the Philadelphia 76ers in the second round of the 2001 NBA draft. Throughout his NBA career he played for the 76ers, the Toronto Raptors, the New Jersey Nets and the Washington Wizards while averaging 2.8 points and 1.3 rebounds per game in 39 career games. He played seven games with the Indiana Pacers in the 2005–06 preseason.

Brown's final NBA game was played on April 15, 2005, in a 119 - 111 win over the Cleveland Cavaliers where he recorded 2 points and 1 rebound in 3 minutes of playing time.

In 2007, Brown was a member of the NBA Development League's Sioux Falls Skyforce. In the 2008 D-League Expansion Draft Brown had his rights drafted by the Reno Bighorns.

On February 26, 2009, Brown was arrested in Reno, Nevada and charged with money laundering in connection with a cocaine ring operating in Buffalo, New York that was associated with the 31 Gang.

In 2010, Brown played for the Buffalo Stampede of the PBL (Premier Basketball League).

== Coaching career ==
In 2015, Brown was hired an assistant coach at Villa Maria College in Buffalo, New York.

After spending three seasons with the Vikings, Brown was hired as the head coach at Bryant & Stratton College of Buffalo to lead the first year program. He led the Bobcats to a 17–12 record in their inaugural season and a trip to the United States Collegiate Athletic Association (USCAA) National Final Four. This past season, Brown once again led the Bobcats to a trip to the national tournament, finishing the season 19–11 after the tournament was cut short to the COVID-19 pandemic.

Brown also continues to coach with the private coaching service, CoachUp, giving lessons in upstate New York.
