= Coppin State University =

Historically Black university in Baltimore, Maryland, US

- Former names: Fanny Jackson Coppin Normal School (1926–1938); Coppin Teachers College (1938–1950); Coppin State Teachers College (1950–1963); Coppin State College (1963–2004)
- Motto: Nurturing Potential... Transforming Lives
- Type: Public historically black university
- Established: 1900
- Academic affiliations: CUMU
- President: Anthony L. Jenkins
- Students: 2,210 (fall 2024)
- Undergraduates: 1,907 (fall 2024)
- Postgraduates: 303 (fall 2024)
- Location: Baltimore, Maryland, United States; 39.31028°N 76.65861°W
- Campus: Urban 52 acres (21 ha)
- Colors: Blue and gold
- Nickname: Eagles
- Sporting affiliations: NCAA Division I – FCS: MEAC
- Website: www.coppin.edu

Coppin State University (Coppin) is a public historically black university in Baltimore, Maryland, United States. It is part of the University System of Maryland and a member of the Thurgood Marshall College Fund.

== History ==
Coppin State University was founded in 1900 at what was then called Colored High School (later named Douglass High School) on Pennsylvania Avenue by the Baltimore City School Board. It first had a one-year training course for the preparation of African-American elementary school teachers. By 1902, the training program was expanded to a two-year Normal Department within the high school. Seven years later it was separated from the high school and given its own principal.

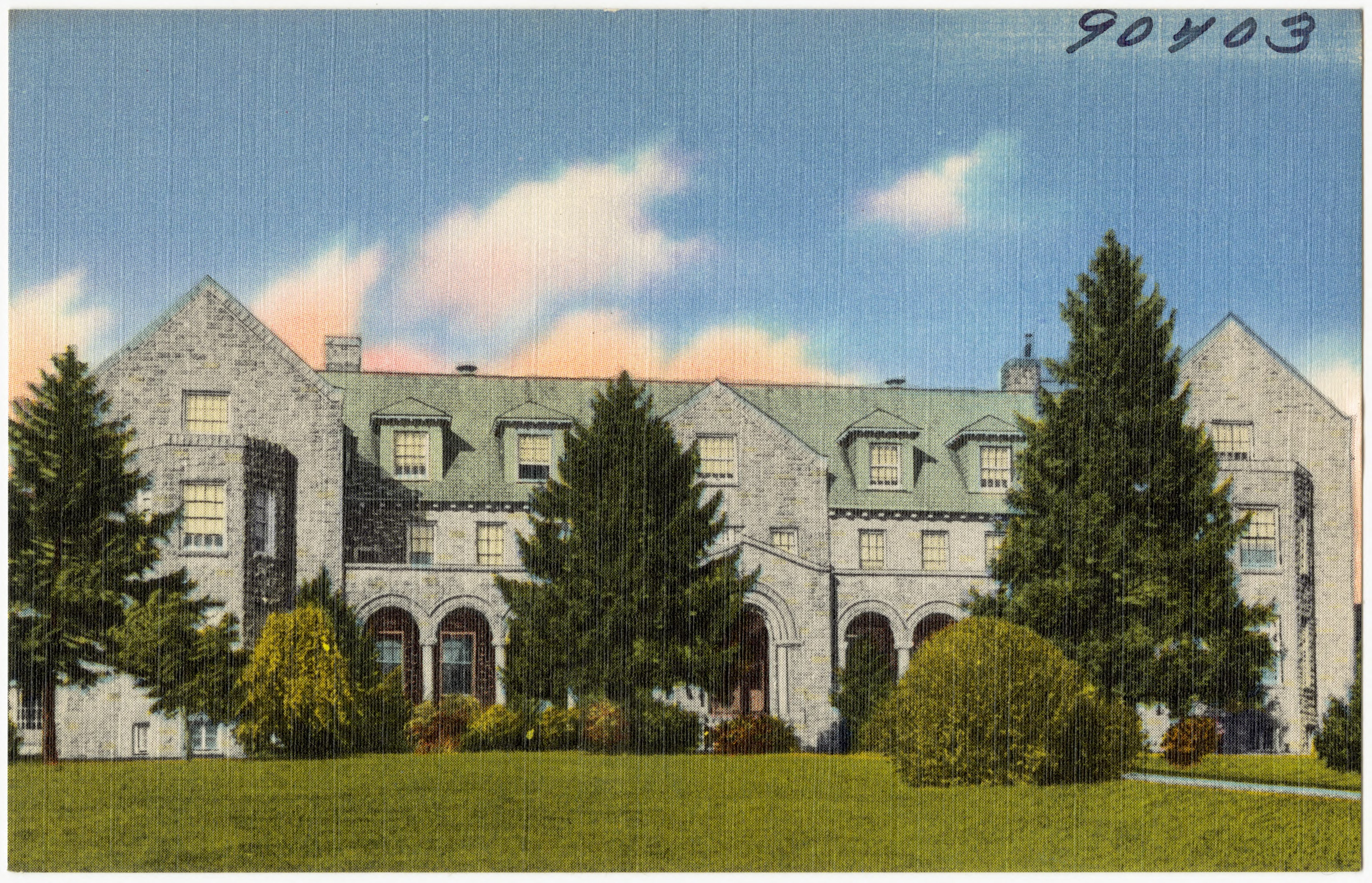
The Coppin State Teachers College on North Avenue

In 1926, this facility for teacher training was named Fanny Jackson Coppin Normal School in honor of an African-American woman who was a pioneer in teacher education, Fanny Jackson Coppin.

By 1938 the curriculum of the normal school was lengthened to four years, authority was given for the granting of the Bachelor of Science degree, and the name of the Normal School was changed to Coppin Teachers College. In 1950, Coppin became part of the higher education system of Maryland under the State Department of Education, and renamed Coppin State Teachers College. Two years later, Coppin moved to its present 38-acre (150,000 m^{2}) site on West North Avenue.

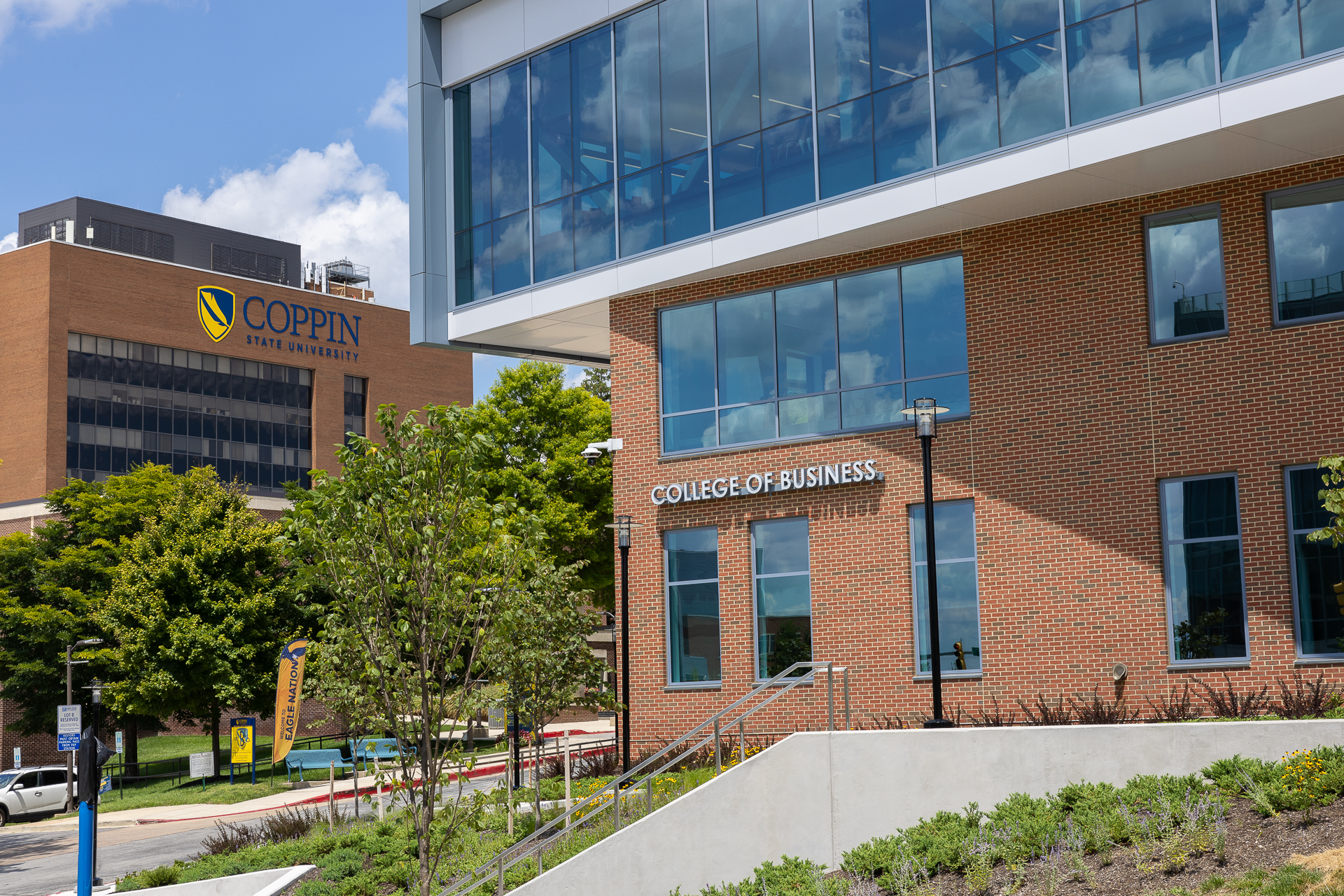
College of Business Building on campus

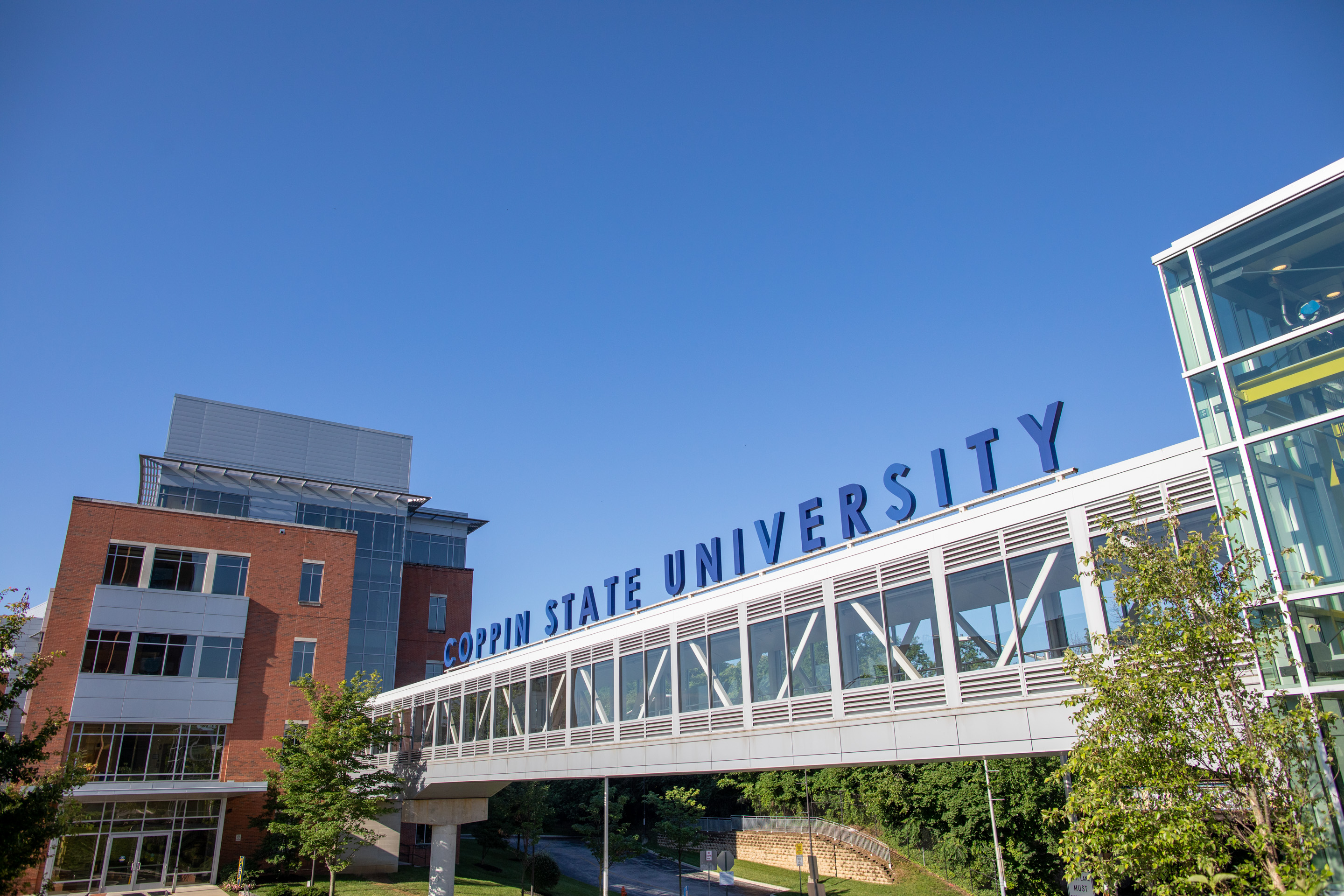
Eagle Walk connected to Health & Human Services Building on campus

In acknowledgment of the goals and objectives of the college, the Board of Trustees ruled in 1963 that the institution's degree-granting authority would no longer be restricted to teacher education. Following this ruling, Coppin was officially renamed Coppin State College, and in 1967 the first Bachelor of Arts degree was conferred. In 1988, the College became part of the newly organized University of Maryland System (now the University System of Maryland.) The school was officially renamed Coppin State University on April 13, 2004.

Coppin's first president (1930–1956) was Miles Connor. He was succeeded by Parlett Moore in 1956, who served until Calvin W. Burnett took over as Coppin's third president in 1970. Burnett served the institution for 33 years, until Coppin's fourth president, Stanley F. Battle, was appointed on March 3, 2003. After Battle departed for North Carolina A&T State University in 2007, Coppin's fifth president, Reginald Avery, was hired. He announced his resignation effective January 22, 2013. Mortimer H. Neufville became the university's sixth president on January 23, after Avery stepped down. Maria Thompson became the university's seventh and first woman president on July 1, 2015. Following her retirement in June 2019, Mickey L. Burnim was appointed interim president until May 2020. Anthony L. Jenkins was appointed Coppin State University's eighth president on May 26, 2020.

In 2022, after Andrew Jackson School in Philadelphia changed its name to Fanny Jackson Coppin School, Coppin State University offered free tuition to Coppin School graduates.

== Academics ==
Coppin State University is classified among "Master's Colleges & Universities: Small Programs" and institutionally accredited by the Middle States Commission on Higher Education. Specific programs are accredited by the Commission on Nursing Education (CCNE), the Council on Rehabilitation Education (CORE), the Council for the Accreditation of Counseling and Related Educational Programs (CACREP), the Council on Social Work Education (CSWE), and the Commission on Accreditation of Health Informatics and Information Management Education (CAHIIM). Additionally, the Accreditation Council for Business Schools and Programs (ACBSP) accredits the College of Business.

CSU offers undergraduate and graduate degree and certificate programs through the following colleges:

- College of Arts & Sciences, and Education
- College of Behavioral & Social Sciences
- College of Business
- College of Health Professions

Coppin has offered a selective honors program since 1981 for high-performing undergraduate students. The honors program students live on the same floor in the Daley building and are recipients of one or more scholarships.

== Student activities ==
Undergraduate demographics as of Fall 2023
Race and ethnicity	Total
Black	83%
International student	5%
Hispanic	4%
Unknown	4%
American Indian/Alaska Native	1%
Asian	1%
Two or more races	1%
White	1%
Economic diversity
Low-income (Note: The percentage of students who received an income-based federal Pell grant intended for low-income students.)	55%
Affluent (Note: The percentage of students who are a part of the American middle class at the bare minimum.)	45%

There are over 30 student organizations on campus.

=== Athletics ===
The Coppin State Eagles compete in the Mid-Eastern Athletic Conference and in the NCAA Division I. The school has men's teams in baseball, basketball, cross country, tennis, indoor and outdoor track and field, and women's teams in basketball, bowling, cross country, softball, tennis, indoor and outdoor track and field, and volleyball.

In 1997, the Coppin State men's basketball team defeated the University of South Carolina in the opening round of the NCAA Men's Division I Basketball Championship becoming just the third #15 seed to defeat a #2 seed. In the 2007–08 season, Coppin State became the first team in NCAA College Basketball history to reach the NCAA Tournament with 20 losses.

Under the direction of Coach Leon Stewart, Coppin State began breaking school records in bowling, which is one of its newer teams. In 2012, the Eagles signed two premier women bowlers, Kache Woods and Kristen Sharpe. The 2013 recruiting class included Woods and Sharpe, along with Erica Washington, Loren Johnson, and Heather Josker. With this influx of talent, the 2013 Eagles broke the school record for most wins. The Eagles upped that performance in 2014 once again as they set a Coppin State record for wins in a season.

=== Greek life ===
Coppin State actively has all nine National Pan-Hellenic Council (NPHC) organizations present on campus.

== Notable alumni ==
Name	Class year	Notability	Reference(s)
Raheem DeVaughn		R&B and neo-soul artist	
Damon Elliott		music and film producer; independent record label CEO	
Jean Hill		actress in Desperate Living, Polyester, and A Dirty Shame	
Tywain McKee	2009	professional basketball player in Australia for the Wollongong Hawks	
Margaret "Peggy" Murphy	1952	first black woman to chair the Baltimore City Delegation	
Michael Norwood	2007	former PBL player for the Buffalo Stampede	
Dorian Peña	1999	Philippine Basketball Association Player, San Miguel Beermen	
Stephanie Ready	1998	first female coach in professional men's basketball and sideline TV sports reporter	
Rafi Reavis	1999	Philippine Basketball Association player, Derby Ace Llamados	
Bishop L. Robinson		first African American Police Commissioner of Baltimore City, 1984–1987	
Larry Stewart	1991	former NBA player for the Washington Bullets and Seattle SuperSonics	
Verda Welcome	1932	Maryland politician and educator	
Bernice Smith White		women's rights activist	
