= Northeast-10 Conference =

US college athletic conference

Northeast 10 Conference
- Association: NCAA
- Founded: 1980; 46 years ago
- Commissioner: Julie Ruppert
- Sports fielded: 24; men's: 12; women's: 12
- Division: Division II
- No. of teams: 10 (9 in 2027)
- Headquarters: Mansfield, Massachusetts
- Region: Northeastern United States
- Website: northeast10.org

Locations
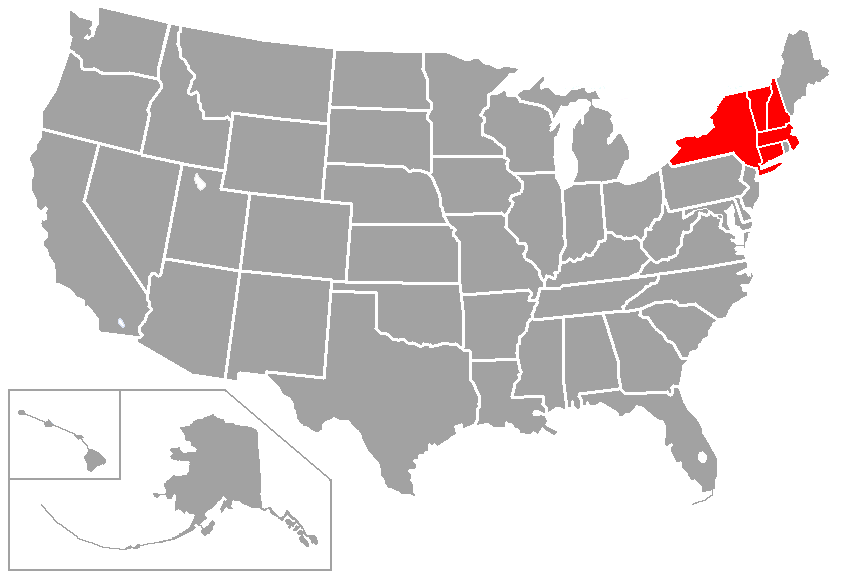

The Northeast 10 Conference (NE10) is a college athletic conference affiliated with the National Collegiate Athletic Association (NCAA) at the Division II level. Member institutions are located in the northeastern United States in the states of Connecticut, Massachusetts, New Hampshire, New York, and Vermont. It is the only Division II collegiate ice hockey conference in the United States.

== History ==
Northeast-10 Conference
Location of NE10 members: full, departing, affiliate. Not Pictured: Affiliate Thomas Jefferson University

The original 1980 conference was called the "Northeast 7" as the colleges were American International College, Assumption College, Bentley College, Bryant College, the University of Hartford, Springfield College, and Stonehill College. In 1981, Saint Anselm College was the eighth team to join and the resulting "NE-8" stayed this way until 1984 when the University of Hartford left and Merrimack College joined.

The “Northeast 10” name came about in 1987 when Saint Michael's College and Quinnipiac College joined the league. The conference remained stable until 1995 when Springfield College left for Division III. The league stayed at ten members as Le Moyne College joined the league in 1996 from the New England Collegiate Conference (NECC) and briefly expanded to eleven when Pace University joined in 1997 from the New York Collegiate Athletic Conference (NYCAC). Quinnipiac moved to the Division I Northeast Conference (NEC) to again return the membership to ten.

The last major expansion took place prior to 2000, when five new schools joined the fold. Franklin Pierce College, Southern New Hampshire University (SNHU; formerly New Hampshire College), the University of Massachusetts Lowell (UMass Lowell), and Southern Connecticut State University (SCSU) and the College of Saint Rose (Saint Rose) giving the NE10 15 members.

Since the addition of those five institutions, the league has added football, indoor track and field, and outdoor track and field as championship sports. The expansion continued in 2003–04 as the conference added another three championships – men's swimming and diving, women's swimming and diving, and men's ice hockey. However, because the NE10 is the sole Division II men's ice hockey league, its postseason champion cannot compete for the NCAA national hockey championship.

David Brunk, the first full-time commissioner in league history, announced in April he was resigning July 1, 2007 to take over the Peach Belt Conference. Brunk had been commissioner since 1998. Julie Ruppert became the next full-time commissioner in June 2008, becoming the first female Division II commissioner in the country.

In 2008, Bryant University announced it would begin the five-year process that would make them a full Division I member by 2012; at the same time the NE10 announced that it had given a bid to University of New Haven and they had accepted. In December 2007, Adelphi University announced it had joined the league and began playing in 2009–10. To start the 2008–09 academic year, the NE10 still had 15 members and expanded to 16 in 2009–10.

On July 1, 2013, UMass Lowell left the NE10 to join the Division I America East Conference. With the departure of UMass Lowell, the Northeast-10 Conference had 15 remaining members.

Two other changes to the conference membership, both taking effect with the 2019–20 school year, were announced in 2018. First, Merrimack announced that it would begin a transition to Division I and join the Northeast Conference (the same move that Bryant made in 2008). Then, Long Island University announced that it would unify its two athletic programs – the Division I LIU Brooklyn Blackbirds and the Division II LIU Post Pioneers, the latter of which was a NE10 affiliate member in field hockey and football at the time of announcement into a single D-I athletic program under the LIU name. As such, the LIU Post field hockey team was merged with LIU Brooklyn's previously existing team in that sport, and the LIU Post football team became the new LIU football team, competing as a Division I FCS team in the Northeast Conference. Thus, the NE10 was at a total of 14 member schools. In 2022, the number was reduced to 13 with Stonehill College's announcement of its departure for Division I's Northeast Conference (NEC).

The next change in conference membership took place on July 1, 2023 when Le Moyne left for the NEC, dropping the NE10 to 12 members for the 2023–24 season.

In 2023, St. Rose announced it was ceasing operations after the 2023–24 academic year, dropping the NE10 to 11 members, effective for the 2024–25 school year.

On May 6, 2025, New Haven announced it had accepted an invitation to join the Northeast Conference and begin its reclassification from Division II, starting on July 1, 2025; thus leaving the NE10 to 10 members, effective for the 2025–26 school year.

=== Chronological timeline ===
- 1980 – The Northeast-10 Conference (NE10) was founded. Charter members included American International College, Assumption College (now Assumption University), Bentley College (now Bentley University), Bryant College (now Bryant University), the University of Hartford, Springfield College and Stonehill College, beginning the 1980–81 academic year.
- 1981 – Saint Anselm College joined the NE10 in the 1981–82 academic year.
- 1984
  - Hartford left the NE10 to join the Division I ranks of the National Collegiate Athletic Association (NCAA) and the ECAC North Atlantic Conference (now the America East Conference) after the 1983–84 academic year.
  - Merrimack College joined the NE10 in the 1984–85 academic year.
- 1987 – Quinnipiac College (now Quinnipiac University) and Saint Michael's College joined the NE10 in the 1987–88 academic year.
- 1995 – Springfield (Mass.) left the NE10 to join the NCAA Division III ranks and the Constitution Athletic Conference after the 1994–95 academic year.
- 1996 – Le Moyne College joined the NE10 in the 1996–97 academic year.
- 1997 – Pace University joined the NE10 in the 1997–98 academic year.
- 1998 – Quinnipiac left the NE10 to join the NCAA Division I ranks and the Northeast Conference (NEC) after the 1997–98 academic year.
- 2000 – Franklin Pierce College (now Franklin Pierce University), the University of Massachusetts at Lowell (UMass Lowell), New Hampshire College (now Southern New Hampshire University), the College of Saint Rose and Southern Connecticut State University joined the NE10 in the 2000–01 academic year.
- 2001 – Long Island University–Post (LIU Post) joined the NE10 as an associate member for football in the 2001 fall season (2001–02 academic year).
- 2008
  - Bryant left the NE10 to join the NCAA Division I ranks and the NEC after the 2007–08 academic year.
  - LIU Post left the NE10 as an associate member for football after the 2007 fall season (2007–08 academic year).
  - The University of New Haven joined the NE10 in the 2008–09 academic year.
- 2009 – Adelphi University joined the NE10 in the 2009–10 academic year.
- 2013
  - UMass Lowell left the NE10 to join the NCAA Division I ranks and the America East Conference after the 2012–13 academic year.
  - LIU Post rejoined the NE10 as an associate member for football (but also included field hockey) in the 2013 fall season (2013–14 academic year).
- 2019
  - Merrimack left the NE10 to join the NCAA Division I ranks and the NEC after the 2018–19 academic year.
  - LIU Post left the NE10 as an associate member for football and field hockey after the 2018 fall season (2018–19 academic year), as the school announced that it would merge with Long Island University–Brooklyn (LIU Brooklyn) to unify its athletic programs after the 2018 fall season (2018–19 academic year).
  - Four institutions joined the NE10 as associate members, all effective in the 2019–20 academic year:
    - Mercy College, Molloy College and St. Thomas Aquinas College for field hockey
    - and Post University for men's ice hockey
- 2022 – Stonehill left the NE10 to join the NCAA Division I ranks and the NEC after the 2021–22 academic year.
- 2023
  - Le Moyne left the NE10 to join the NCAA Division I ranks and the NEC after the 2022–23 academic year.
  - The College of Staten Island joined the NE10 as an associate member in both men's and women's swimming and diving in the 2023–24 academic year.
- 2024
  - Saint Rose left the NE10 as the school announced that it ceased operations after the 2023–24 academic year.
  - Post added football to its NE10 associate membership in the 2024 season (2024–25 academic year).
- 2025
  - The American International men's ice hockey team rejoined the NE10 after moving down from Division I to Division II, beginning the 2025–26 academic year.
  - New Haven left the NE10 to join the NCAA Division I ranks and the NEC, beginning the 2025–26 academic year.
  - The University of Bridgeport and Felician University joined the NE10 as associate members in both men's and women's swimming and diving, beginning the 2025–26 academic year.
- 2026 – Mercy, Molloy, and St. Thomas Aquinas left the NE10 as associate members for field hockey to move their programs to their full-time conference home of the ECC once it begins play in the 2026 season (2026–27 academic year).
- 2027
  - Saint Anselm will leave the NE10 to join the NCAA Division III ranks and the New England Women's and Men's Athletic Conference (NEWMAC) after the 2026–27 academic year.
  - Monroe University will join the NE10 as an associate member for football, beginning the 2027 fall season (2027–28 academic year).

== Member schools ==
=== Current members ===
The NE10 currently has 10 full members; all but one are private schools.

Institution	Location	Founded	Affiliation	Enrollment	Nickname	Joined (Note: Represents the calendar year when fall sports competition begins.)	Colors
Adelphi University	Garden City, New York	1896	Nonsectarian	7,603	Panthers	2009	
American International College	Springfield, Massachusetts	1885	Nonsectarian	2,010	Yellow Jackets	1980	
Assumption University	Worcester, Massachusetts	1904	Catholic (Assumptionists)	2,044	Greyhounds	1980	
Bentley University	Waltham, Massachusetts	1917	Nonsectarian	4,526	Falcons	1980	
Franklin Pierce University	Rindge, New Hampshire	1962	Nonsectarian	1,172	Ravens	2000	
Pace University	Pleasantville, New York (Note: Pace University has two campuses: one in Pleasantville and one in New York City. All of its athletic facilities are located at the Pleasantville campus.)	1906	Nonsectarian	14,092	Setters	1997	
Saint Anselm College	Goffstown, New Hampshire	1889	Catholic (Benedictines)	2,111	Hawks	1981	
Saint Michael's College	Colchester, Vermont	1904	Catholic (S.S.E.)	1,370	Purple Knights	1987	
Southern Connecticut State University	New Haven, Connecticut	1893	Public	9,377	Owls	2000	
Southern New Hampshire University	Manchester and Hooksett, New Hampshire (Note: The college's athletic facilities are spread across the campus, which is split between Manchester and Hooksett.)	1932	Nonsectarian	2,769 (Note: Residential enrollment only. SNHU also claims approximately 200,000 online students (about 100,000 full-time equivalents).)	Penmen	2000	

=== Affiliate members ===
The NE10 currently has 5 affiliate members; all are private schools.

Institution	Location	Founded	Affiliation	Enrollment	Nickname	Joined (Note: Represents the calendar year when fall sports competition begins.)	Colors	NE10 sport(s)	Primary conference
University of Bridgeport	Bridgeport, Connecticut	1927	Nonsectarian	3,838	Purple Knights	2025		Men's swimming and diving	Central Atlantic (CACC)
University of Bridgeport	Bridgeport, Connecticut	1927	Nonsectarian	3,838	Purple Knights	2025		Women's swimming and diving	Central Atlantic (CACC)
Felician University	Rutherford, New Jersey	1923	Catholic (CSSF)	2,427	Golden Falcons	2025		Men's swimming and diving	Central Atlantic (CACC)
Felician University	Rutherford, New Jersey	1923	Catholic (CSSF)	2,427	Golden Falcons	2025		Women's swimming and diving	Central Atlantic (CACC)
Post University	Waterbury, Connecticut	1890	For-profit	21,699	Eagles	2019		Men's ice hockey	Central Atlantic (CACC)
Post University	Waterbury, Connecticut	1890	For-profit	21,699	Eagles	2024		Football	Central Atlantic (CACC)
Thomas Jefferson University	Philadelphia, Pennsylvania	1824	Nonsectarian	8,315	Rams	2025		Women's golf	Central Atlantic (CACC)
College of Staten Island	Staten Island, New York	1956	Public	10,973	Dolphins	2023		Men's swimming and diving	East Coast (ECC)
College of Staten Island	Staten Island, New York	1956	Public	10,973	Dolphins	2023		Women's swimming and diving	East Coast (ECC)

=== Future affiliate members ===
Institution	Location	Founded	Affiliation	Enrollment	Nickname	Joining (Note: Represents the calendar year when fall sports competition begins.)	Colors	NE10 sport(s)	Primary conference
Monroe University	New Rochelle, New York	1933	For-profit	7,924	Mustangs	2027		Football	NJCAA Independent (Central Atlantic (CACC) in 2027)

=== Former members ===
The NE10 had ten former full members; all but one were private schools.

Institution	Location	Founded	Affiliation	Enrollment	Nickname	Joined (Note: Represents the calendar year when fall sports competition begins.)	Left (Note: Represents the calendar year when spring sports competition ends.)	Current conference
Bryant University	Smithfield, Rhode Island	1863	Nonsectarian	3,499	Bulldogs	1980	2008	America East (AmEast) (Note: Currently an NCAA Division I athletic conference.)
University of Hartford	West Hartford, Connecticut	1877	Nonsectarian	6,792	Hawks	1980	1984	New England (CNE) (Note: Currently an NCAA Division III athletic conference.)
Le Moyne College	Syracuse, New York	1946	Catholic (A.J.C.U.)	3,533	Dolphins	1996	2023	Northeast (NEC)
University of Massachusetts Lowell (UMass Lowell)	Lowell, Massachusetts	1894	Public	18,369	River Hawks	2000	2013	America East (AmEast)
Merrimack College	North Andover, Massachusetts	1947	Catholic (O.S.A.)	3,726	Warriors	1984	2019	Metro Atlantic (MAAC)
University of New Haven	West Haven, Connecticut	1920	Nonsectarian	8,819	Chargers	2008	2025	Northeast (NEC)
Quinnipiac University	Hamden, Connecticut	1929	Nonsectarian	10,207	Bobcats	1987	1998	Metro Atlantic (MAAC)
Springfield College	Springfield, Massachusetts	1885	Nonsectarian	5,062	Pride	1980	1995	New England (NEWMAC)
College of Saint Rose	Albany, New York	1920	Catholic (S.S.J.)	N/A	Golden Knights	2000	2024	Closed in 2024
Stonehill College	Easton, Massachusetts	1948	Catholic (C.S.C.)	2,386	Skyhawks	1980	2022	Northeast (NEC)

=== Former affiliate members ===
The NE10 had four former affiliate members, all a private schools.

Institution	Location	Founded	Affiliation	Enrollment	Nickname	Joined (Note: Represents the calendar year when fall sports competition begins.)	Left (Note: Represents the calendar year when spring sports competition ends.)	NE10 sport(s)	Primary conference
Long Island University–Post	Brookville, New York	1954	Nonsectarian	8,472	Pioneers	2001	2008	Football	Northeast (NEC) (Note: Currently an NCAA Division I athletic conference.) (Note: Long Island University merged the Post athletic program with the NCAA Division I program of its Brooklyn campus in 2019. The merged program inherited the Division I membership of the Brooklyn campus, and now competes in the Northeast Conference as the LIU Sharks.)
Long Island University–Post	Brookville, New York	1954	Nonsectarian	8,472	Pioneers	2013	2019	Football	Northeast (NEC)
Long Island University–Post	Brookville, New York	1954	Nonsectarian	8,472	Pioneers	2013	2019	Field hockey	Northeast (NEC)
Mercy University	Dobbs Ferry, New York	1950	Nonsectarian	8,774	Mavericks	2019	2026	Field hockey	East Coast (ECC)
Molloy University	Rockville Center, New York	1955	Catholic (Dominican Order)	4,845	Lions	2019	2026	Field hockey	East Coast (ECC)
St. Thomas Aquinas College	Sparkill, New York	1952	Catholic (D.S.S.)	1,950	Spartans	2019	2026	Field hockey	East Coast (ECC)

=== Membership timeline ===
Full member (all sports) Full member (non-football) Associate member (football) Associate member (sport)

== Conference facilities ==
School	Football stadium	Capacity	Basketball arena	Capacity	Hockey arena	Capacity
Adelphi	Non-football school		Center for Recreation & Sport	2,200	Non-hockey school	
American International	Ronald J. Abdow Field	4,000	Butova Gymnasium	2,500	Olympia Ice Center	2,200
Assumption	Greyhound Stadium	1,200	Andrew Laska Gymnasium	1,200	Buffone Arena	750
Bentley	Bentley Athletic Field	4,800	Dana Center	2,600	Plays hockey at the D-I level in Atlantic Hockey America. Bentley plays games at Bentley Arena.	1,917
Franklin Pierce	Sodexo Field	500	Franklin Pierce Fieldhouse	1,200	Jason Ritchie Ice Arena	500
Monroe	The Stadium at Memorial Field	3,900	Football member only			
Pace	Pace Stadium	1,500	Goldstein Fitness Center	2,400	Non-hockey school	
Post	Municipal Stadium	6,000	Football and hockey member only		Sports Center of Connecticut	
Saint Anselm	Grappone Stadium	4,500	Stoutenburgh Gymnasium	1,200	Thomas F. Sullivan Arena	2,700
Saint Michael's	Non-football school		Ross Sports Center	2,500	Cairns Arena	600
Southern Connecticut	Jess Dow Field	6,000	James Moore Fieldhouse	2,800	Non-hockey school	
Southern New Hampshire	Non-football school		Stan Spirou Fieldhouse	2,000	Ice Den Arena	

== Presidents' Cup Champions ==
Year	First place	Second place	Third place
1985	Springfield	Bryant	St. Anselm
1986	Springfield	Bryant	Bentley
1987	Springfield	Bentley	Bryant
1988	Springfield	Bentley	Bryant
1989	Springfield	Bentley	Bryant
1990	Springfield	Bentley	Merrimack
1991	Springfield	Bentley	Merrimack
1992	Springfield	Bentley	Quinnipiac
1993	Springfield	Bentley	Quinnipiac
1994	Springfield	Bentley	Quinnipiac
1995	Springfield	Bentley	Quinnipiac
1996	Bentley	Quinnipiac	St. Anselm
1997	Bentley	Quinnipiac	Merrimack
1998	Bentley	Quinnipiac	Merrimack
1999	Bentley	Merrimack	St. Anselm
2000	Merrimack	Bentley	Assumption
2001	Bentley	Merrimack	Assumption
2002	Bryant	Bentley	Southern Connecticut State
2003	Bryant	Bentley	UMass Lowell
2004	Bryant	Bentley	UMass Lowell
2005	Bryant	Bentley	Stonehill
2006	Bryant	Stonehill	Bentley
2007	Bryant	Bentley	Stonehill
2008	Bryant	Bentley	Stonehill
2009	Bentley	Stonehill	UMass Lowell
2010	Stonehill	Bentley	Adelphi
2011	Stonehill	Bentley	Southern Connecticut State
2012	Stonehill	Southern Connecticut State	Bentley
2013	Adelphi	Bentley	Stonehill
2014	Adelphi	Stonehill	Bentley
2015	Stonehill	Adelphi	Assumption
2016	Adelphi	Bentley	Stonehill
2017	Adelphi	Stonehill	Merrimack
2018	Merrimack	Adelphi	Stonehill
2019	Merrimack	Adelphi	Assumption
2020*	Southern New Hampshire	Stonehill	Adelphi
2020**	Stonehill	Southern Connecticut State	Assumption
2021	Franklin Pierce	Adelphi	Le Moyne
2022	Southern New Hampshire	Adelphi	Bentley
2023	Southern New Hampshire	Adelphi	Bentley
2024	Adelphi	Bentley	Southern New Hampshire
2025	Adelphi	Bentley	Southern New Hampshire
2026	Adelphi	Bentley	Saint Anselm
* Fall Champion. **Winter Champion

== Sports ==
A divisional format was used for baseball.
Northeast
- Assumption
- Bentley
- Franklin Pierce
- Saint Anselm
- Saint Michael's
- Southern New Hampshire
Southwest
- Adelphi
- American International
- New Haven
- Pace
- Southern Connecticut

Conference sports
Sport	Men's	Women's
Baseball	✓	
Basketball	✓	✓
Cross Country	✓	✓
Field Hockey		✓
Football	✓	
Golf	✓	✓
Ice Hockey	✓	
Lacrosse	✓	✓
Soccer	✓	✓
Softball		✓
Swimming & Diving	✓	✓
Tennis	✓	✓
Track & Field Indoor	✓	✓
Track & Field Outdoor	✓	✓
Volleyball		✓

=== Men's sponsored sports by school ===
School	Baseball	Basketball	Cross Country	Football	Golf	Ice Hockey	Lacrosse	Soccer	Swimming & Diving	Tennis	Track & Field Indoor	Track & Field Outdoor	Total NE10 Sports
Adelphi	✓	✓	✓	✗	✓	✗	✓	✓	✓	✓	✓	✓	10
American International	✓	✓	✓	✓	✓	✓	✓	✓	✗	✗	✓	✓	10
Assumption	✓	✓	✓	✓	✓	✓	✓	✓	✓	✓	✓	✓	12
Bentley	✓	✓	✓	✓	✓	✗ (Note: Bentley's varsity men's hockey team plays under NCAA Division I scholarship regulations.)	✓	✓	✓	✓	✓	✓	11
Franklin Pierce	✓	✓	✓	✓	✓	✓	✓	✓	✗	✓	✓	✓	11
Pace	✓	✓	✓	✓	✗	✗	✓	✗	✓	✗	✗	✗	6
Saint Anselm	✓	✓	✓	✓	✓	✓	✓	✓	✗	✓	✗	✗	9
Saint Michael's	✓	✓	✓	✗	✓	✓	✓	✓	✓	✓	✗	✗	9
Southern Connecticut	✓	✓	✓	✓	✗	✗	✗	✓	✓	✗	✓	✓	8
Southern New Hampshire	✓	✓	✓	✗	✓	✓	✓	✓	✗	✓	✗	✗	8
Totals	10	10	10	7+1	8	6+1	9	9	6+3	7	6	6	94+5
Affiliate Members
Bridgeport									✓				1
Felician									✓				1
Post				✓		✓							2
Staten Island									✓				1

=== Women's sponsored sports by school ===
School	Basketball	Cross Country	Field Hockey	Golf	Lacrosse	Soccer	Softball	Swimming & Diving	Tennis	Track & Field Indoor	Track & Field Outdoor	Volleyball	Total NE10 Sports
Adelphi	✓	✓	✓	✓	✓	✓	✓	✓	✓	✓	✓	✓	12
American International	✓	✓	✓	✓	✓	✓	✓	✗	✓	✓	✓	✓	11
Assumption	✓	✓	✓	✓	✓	✓	✓	✓	✓	✓	✓	✓	12
Bentley	✓	✓	✓	✗	✓	✓	✓	✓	✓	✓	✓	✓	11
Franklin Pierce	✓	✓	✓	✓	✓	✓	✓	✗	✓	✓	✓	✓	11
Pace	✓	✓	✓	✗	✓	✓	✓	✓	✗	✗	✗	✓	8
Saint Anselm	✓	✓	✓	✗	✓	✓	✓	✗	✓	✗	✗	✓	8
Saint Michael's	✓	✓	✓	✗	✓	✓	✓	✓	✓	✗	✗	✓	9
Southern Connecticut	✓	✓	✓	✗	✓	✓	✓	✓	✗	✓	✓	✓	10
Southern New Hampshire	✓	✓	✓	✓	✓	✓	✓	✗	✓	✓	✓	✓	11
Totals	10	10	10	5+1	10	10	10	6+3	8	7	7	10	103+4
Affiliate Members
Bridgeport								✓					1
Felician								✓					1
Jefferson				✓									1
Staten Island								✓					1

=== Other sponsored sports by school ===
School	Men		Women					Co-ed
School	Ice Hockey (Note: De facto Division I sport. The NCAA conducts combined national championships open to Division I and Division II members in both men's and women's ice hockey, as well as men's volleyball. All NE10 schools with women's ice hockey teams play at this level, as does one of its men's teams. Single national championship meets open to members of all three NCAA divisions are held in bowling, women's gymnastics, and skiing.)	Volleyball	Bowling	Gymnastics	Ice Hockey	Rowing	Triathlon (Note: Part of the NCAA Emerging Sports for Women program. National championships are conducted by USA Triathlon, the sport's national governing body.)	Skiing
Adelphi			ECC					
American International		ECC					IND	
Assumption					NEWHA	IND		
Bentley	AHA							
Franklin Pierce					NEWHA	IND		
Saint Anselm			ECC		NEWHA			
Saint Michael's					NEWHA			EISA
Southern Connecticut				GEC				
