= Miles Connor =

American legislator

Member of the Virginia House of Delegates
- In office 1875–1877

Personal details
- Born: 1830s Norfolk County, Virginia, U.S.
- Died: June 28, 1893
- Party: Republican

Miles Connor (c. 1830s – June 28, 1893) was an African-American politician, farmer, minister, and freedman. He served in the Virginia House of Delegates from 1875 to 1877.

== Early life and family ==
Connor was born into slavery in the 1830s in Norfolk County. He became free after emancipation.

He was married twice and had fourteen children. One of his sons, Miles Washington Connor, became the first president of Coppin State University.

== Career ==
Connor was an active community member in the Western Branch section of Norfolk County (now the city of Chesapeake). He quickly became involved in civil affairs, elected as justice of the peace in 1870 and as a county supervisor in 1874. During this period, Connor also began farming oysters.

From 1875 to 1877, Connor was an elected member of the Virginia House of Delegates. He did not seek re-election in 1877.

Connor was one of the founders of the Churchland Grove Baptist Church in Norfolk County and was a congregation minister.

After serving in the House of Delegates, Connor again served as the justice of the peace for the Western Branch area of Norfolk County.

== Death ==
Connor died on June 28, 1893, due to complications associated with asthma.

== See also ==
- African American officeholders from the end of the Civil War until before 1900
