= New England Collegiate Conference (Division II) =

Former NCAA Division II athletic conference (1981–2000)

- Conference: NCAA
- Founded: 1981
- Folded: 2000
- Sports fielded: 12; men's: 6; women's: 6
- Division: Division II
- No. of teams: 8
- Region: New England

The New England Collegiate Conference (NECC) was an NCAA Division II college athletic conference based in the Northeastern United States that dissolved during the late 1990s after most of its members either moved to Division I or joined Division II leagues such as the Northeast-10 Conference or the New York Collegiate Athletic Conference, now known as the East Coast Conference.

The conference was founded in 1981 as the New England College Basketball League, and eventually expanded to sponsor eleven sports: men's and women's soccer, men's and women's volleyball, men's and women's cross country, men's and women's tennis, men's and women's basketball, baseball and softball.

== History ==
=== Chronological timeline ===
- 1981 – The New England Collegiate Conference was founded as the New England College Basketball League (NECBL). Charter members included the University of Bridgeport, the University of Lowell (now the University of Massachusetts Lowell), New Hampshire College (now Southern New Hampshire University), the University of New Haven, Quinnipiac College (now Quinnipiac University), Sacred Heart University and Southern Connecticut State College (now Southern Connecticut State University), beginning the 1980–81 academic year.
- 1982 – The NECBL became a multi-sport conference and was renamed and rebranded as the New England Collegiate Conference, beginning the 1982–83 academic year.
- 1983 – Central Connecticut State College (now Central Connecticut State University) joined the NECC in the 1983–84 academic year.
- 1985 – Central Connecticut State left the NECC to become an NCAA D-II Independent after the 1984–85 academic year.
- 1986 – Keene State College joined the NECC in the 1986–87 academic year.
- 1987 – Quinnipiac left the NECC to join the Northeast-10 Conference (NE10) after the 1986–87 academic year.
- 1988 – Franklin Pierce College (now Franklin Pierce University) joined the NECC in the 1988–89 academic year.
- 1992 – Le Moyne College joined the NECC in the 1992–93 academic year.
- 1995 – The State University of New York at Albany and the State University of New York at Stony Brook joined the NECC in the 1995–96 academic year.
- 1996 – Le Moyne left the NECC to join the NE10 after the 1995–96 academic year.
- 1997 – Keene State left the NECC to join the NCAA Division III ranks and the Little East Conference after the 1996–97 academic year.
- 1998 – The State University of New York at Binghamton joined the NECC in the 1998–99 academic year.
- 1999 – Three institutions left the NECC to join their respective new home primary conferences, all effective after the 1998–99 academic year:
  - Sacred Heart to join the NCAA Division I ranks and the Northeast Conference (NEC)
  - and SUNY Albany and SUNY Stony Brook to become NCAA D-I Independents (which would later join the America East Conference [AmEast], beginning the 2001–02 school year)
- 1999 – Felician College (now Felician University) and Teikyo Post University joined the NECC in the 1999–2000 academic year.
- 2000 – The NECC ceased operations as an athletic conference after the 1999–2000 academic year; as many schools left to join their respective new home primary conferences, beginning the 2000–01 academic year:
  - Bridgeport to the New York Collegiate Athletic Conference (NYCAC; now known as the East Coast Conference)
  - New Haven to become an NCAA D-II Independent (which would later join the NYCAC, beginning the 2002–03 school year)
  - Franklin Pierce, Massachusetts Lowell (UMass Lowell), Southern Connecticut State and Southern New Hampshire to the NE10
  - SUNY Binghamton to become an NCAA D-I Independents (which would later join the AmEast, beginning the 2001–02 school year)
  - and Felician and Teikyo Post to join the Central Atlantic Collegiate Conference (CACC)

== Member schools ==
=== Final members ===
Institution	Location	Founded	Affiliation	Enrollment	Nickname	Joined (Note: Represents the calendar year when fall sports competition begins.)	Left (Note: Represents the calendar year when spring sports competition ends.)	Subsequent conference(s)	Current conference
Binghamton University	Vestal, New York	1946	Public (Note: Part of the State University of New York System.)	17,768	Bearcats	1998	2000	D-I Independent (2000–01)	America East (AmEast) (Note: Currently an NCAA Division I athletic conference.) (2001–present)
University of Bridgeport	Bridgeport, Connecticut	1927	Nonsectarian	5,543	Purple Knights	1981	2000	East Coast (ECC) (Note: Formerly known as the New York Collegiate Athletic Conference (NYCAC) until spring 2006.) (2000–22)	Central Atlantic (CACC) (2022–present)
Felician College (Note: Currently known as Felician University since 2015.)	Lodi, New Jersey	1923	Catholic (Felician Sisters)	2,109	Golden Falcons	1999	2000	Central Atlantic (CACC) (2000–present)	
Franklin Pierce College (Note: Currently known as Franklin Pierce University since 2007.)	Rindge, New Hampshire	1962	Nonsectarian	2,871	Ravens	1988	2000	Northeast-10 (NE-10) (2000–present)	
University of Lowell (Note: Currently known as the University of Massachusetts Lowell since 1991.)	Lowell, Massachusetts	1894	Public	18,369	River Hawks	1981	2000	Northeast-10 (NE-10) (2000–13)	America East (AmEast) (2013–present)
New Hampshire College (Note: Currently known as Southern New Hampshire University since 2001.)	Manchester, New Hampshire	1932	Nonsectarian	3,913 (Note: Residential enrollment only. SNHU also has approximately 87,000 online students.)	Penmen	1981	2000	Northeast-10 (NE-10) (2000–present)	
University of New Haven	West Haven, Connecticut	1920	Nonsectarian	6,400	Chargers	1981	2000	various (Note: New Haven had joined the following subsequent conferences: as an NCAA D-II Independent from 2000–01 to 2001–02; the East Coast Conference (ECC) from 2002–03 to 2007–08; and the Northeast-10 Conference (NE-10) from 2008–09 to 2024–25.)	Northeast (NEC) (2025–present)
Southern Connecticut State College (Note: Currently known as Southern Connecticut State University since 1983.)	New Haven, Connecticut	1893	Public (Note: Part of the Connecticut State Colleges & Universities System.)	12,326	Owls	1981	2000	Northeast-10 (NE-10) (2000–present)	
Teikyo Post University (Note: Currently known as Post University since 2004.)	Waterbury, Connecticut	1890	For-profit	7,317	Eagles	1999	2000	Central Atlantic (CACC) (2000–present)	

=== Other members ===
Institution	Location	Founded	Affiliation	Enrollment	Nickname	Joined (Note: Represents the calendar year when fall sports competition begins.)	Left (Note: Represents the calendar year when spring sports competition ends.)	Subsequent conference(s)	Current conference
University at Albany	Albany, New York	1844	Public (Note: Part of the State University of New York System.)	17,746	Great Danes	1995	1999	D-I Independent (1999–2001)	America East (AmEast) (Note: Currently an NCAA Division I athletic conference.) (2001–present)
Central Connecticut State College (Note: Currently known as Central Connecticut State University since 2007.)	New Britain, Connecticut	1849	Public (Note: Part of the Connecticut State Colleges & Universities System.)	9,546	Blue Devils	1983	1985	various (Note: Central Connecticut State had joined the following subsequent conferences: as an NCAA D-II Independent during the 1985–86 school year; as an NCAA D-I Independent from 1986–87 to 1989–90, and during the 1992–93 school year; the East Coast Conference (Note: Currently a defunct NCAA Division I athletic conference.) (ECC) from 1990–91 to 1991–92, and during the 1993–94 school year; and the Mid-Continent Conference (Mid-Con) from 1994–95 to 1996–97.)	Northeast (NEC) (1997–present)
Keene State College	Keene, New Hampshire	1909	Public	3,213	Owls	1986	1997	Little East (LEC) (Note: Currently an NCAA Division III athletic conference.) (1997–present)	
Le Moyne College	Syracuse, New York	1946	Catholic (Jesuit)	3,533	Dolphins	1992	1996	Northeast-10 (NE-10) (1996–2023)	Northeast (NEC) (2023–present)
Quinnipiac College (Note: Currently known as Quinnipiac University since 2000.)	Hamden, Connecticut	1929	Nonsectarian	10,207	Bobcats	1981	1987	Northeast-10 (NE-10) (1987–1998); Northeast (NEC) (1998–2013)	Metro Atlantic (MAAC) (2013–present)
Sacred Heart University	Fairfield, Connecticut	1963	Catholic (Diocese of Bridgeport)	5,974	Pioneers	1981	1999	Northeast (NEC) (1999–2024)	Metro Atlantic (MAAC) (2024–present)
Stony Brook University	Stony Brook, New York	1957	Public	26,814	Seawolves	1995	1999	D-I Independent (1999–2001); America East (AmEast) (2001–22)	Coastal (CAA) (2022–present)

=== Membership timeline ===
Full member (non-football) Other conference 1 Other conference 2

== Notable alumni ==
- Bill Bayno, Sacred Heart, Former UNLV head men's basketball coach
- Manute Bol, Bridgeport, NBA center with Washington Bullets, Golden State Warriors, and Philadelphia 76ers
- Joe Nathan, Stony Brook, Major League Baseball pitcher with San Francisco Giants, Minnesota Twins, and Texas Rangers
- Mike Petke, Southern Connecticut, MLS soccer player with Colorado Rapids, New York/New Jersey Metrostars and D.C. United
