= Stan Spirou Field House =

SNHU arena

- Interactive map of Stan Spirou Field House
- Former names: SNHU Fieldhouse
- Location: 2500 N River Road Manchester, New Hampshire 03106
- Coordinates: 43.0386°N 71.4561°W
- Owner: Southern New Hampshire University
- Capacity: 2,000
- Type: Gymnasium
- Event: Sporting events

Construction
- Renovated: 2001, 2014, 2017

Tenants
- SNHU Penman Basketball and Volleyball

The Stan Spirou Field House (formerly known as the SNHU Fieldhouse) is a 2,000 seat multi-purpose facility on the campus of Southern New Hampshire University in Manchester, New Hampshire, United States. A part of their Athletics and Recreation Complex, it is home to the Southern New Hampshire Penmen basketball and volleyball teams, numerous New Hampshire high school basketball tournaments, and was the home of the Manchester Millrats of the Premier Basketball League until their move to Saint John, New Brunswick.

In May 2018, the facility was renamed to honor Stan Spirou. Spirou had coached the men's basketball team for 33 seasons. Spirou was a four-time NECC Coach of the Year (1993, 1994, 1995, 1999), the 2015 Northeast-10 Coach of the Year, a three-time National Association of Basketball Coaches Northeast Coach of the Year (1990, 1994, 1995) and the 1994 Division II Bulletin National Coach of the Year.
