= Hilmar Björnsson =

Icelandic footballer

Personal information
- Full name: Hilmar Björnsson
- Date of birth: 13 May 1969 (age 57)
- Place of birth: Reykjavík, Iceland
- Height: 1.78 m (5 ft 10 in)
- Position: Midfielder

Team information
- Current team: Knattspyrnufélag Reykjavíkur
- Number: 7

Senior career*
| Years | Team | Apps | (Gls) |
| 1988–1997 | KR Reykjavík | 126 | (13) |
| 1998–1999 | Helsingborgs IF | 23 | (1) |
| 1999–2000 | Fram Reykjavík | 26 | (2) |
| 2000–2002 | FH Hafnarfjörður | 44 | (7) |
| 2002–2004 | KR Reykjavík | 29 | (3) |

International career
| 1994–1997 | Iceland | 3 | (0) |
- * Club domestic league appearances and goals

Hilmar Björnsson (born 13 May 1969) is an Icelandic former football player who made three appearances for the Iceland national football team. He now works as Head of Sports for Ruv, Icelandic National Broadcasting Service.
