= Broadway-Fillmore, Buffalo =

Coordinates: 42°53′45.5″N 78°50′40.4″W

Broadway-Filmore
- Neighborhood
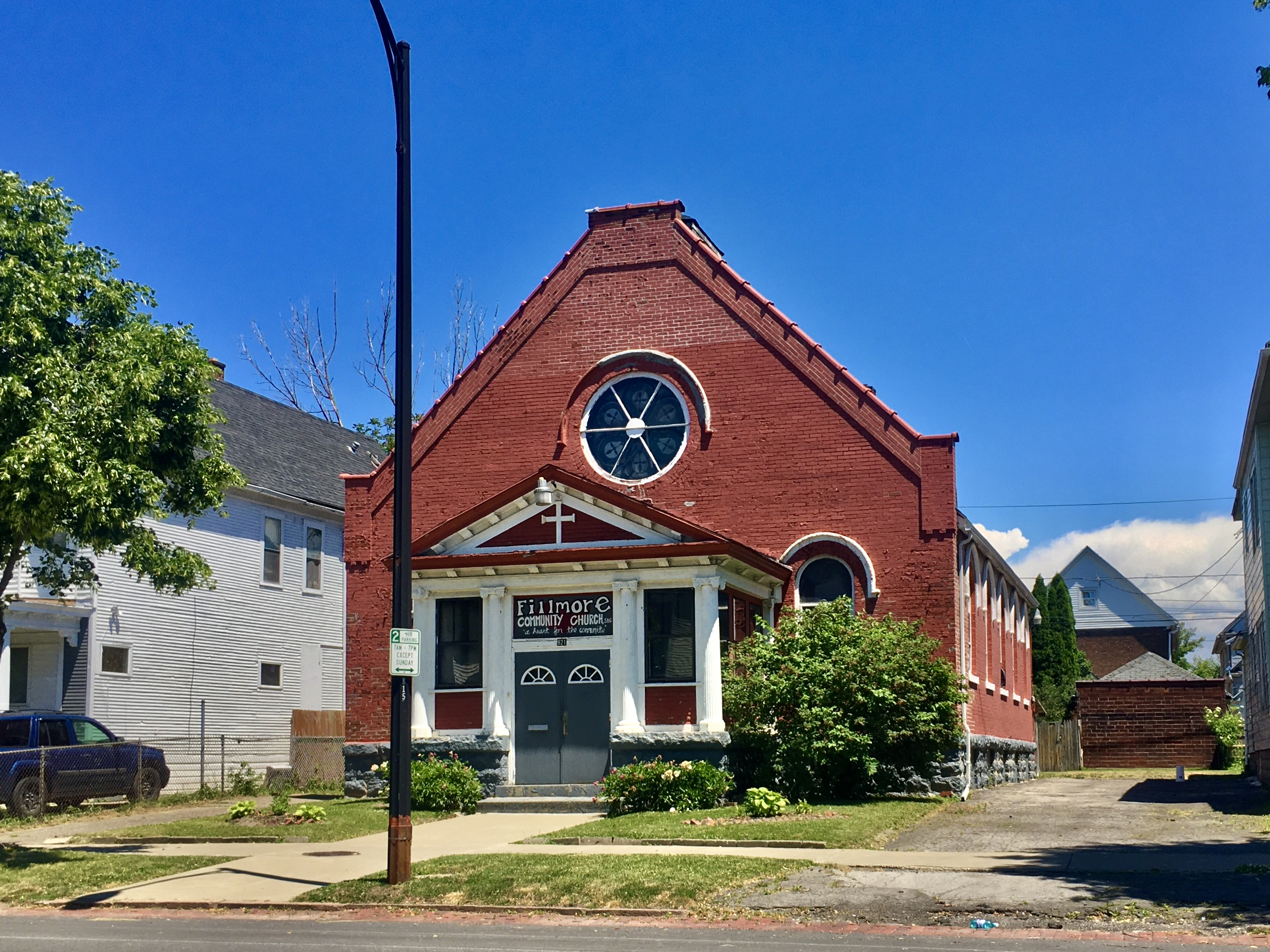
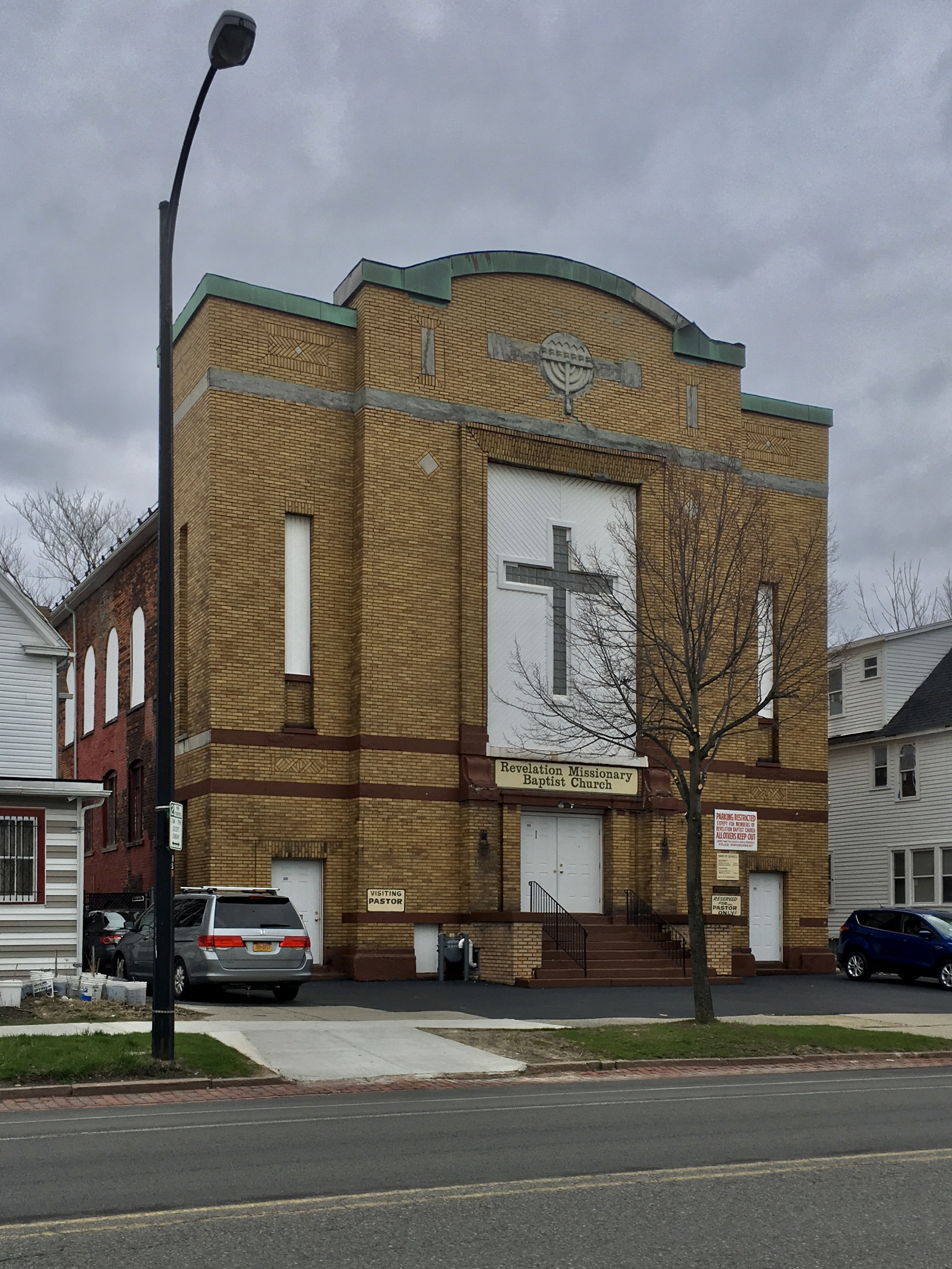
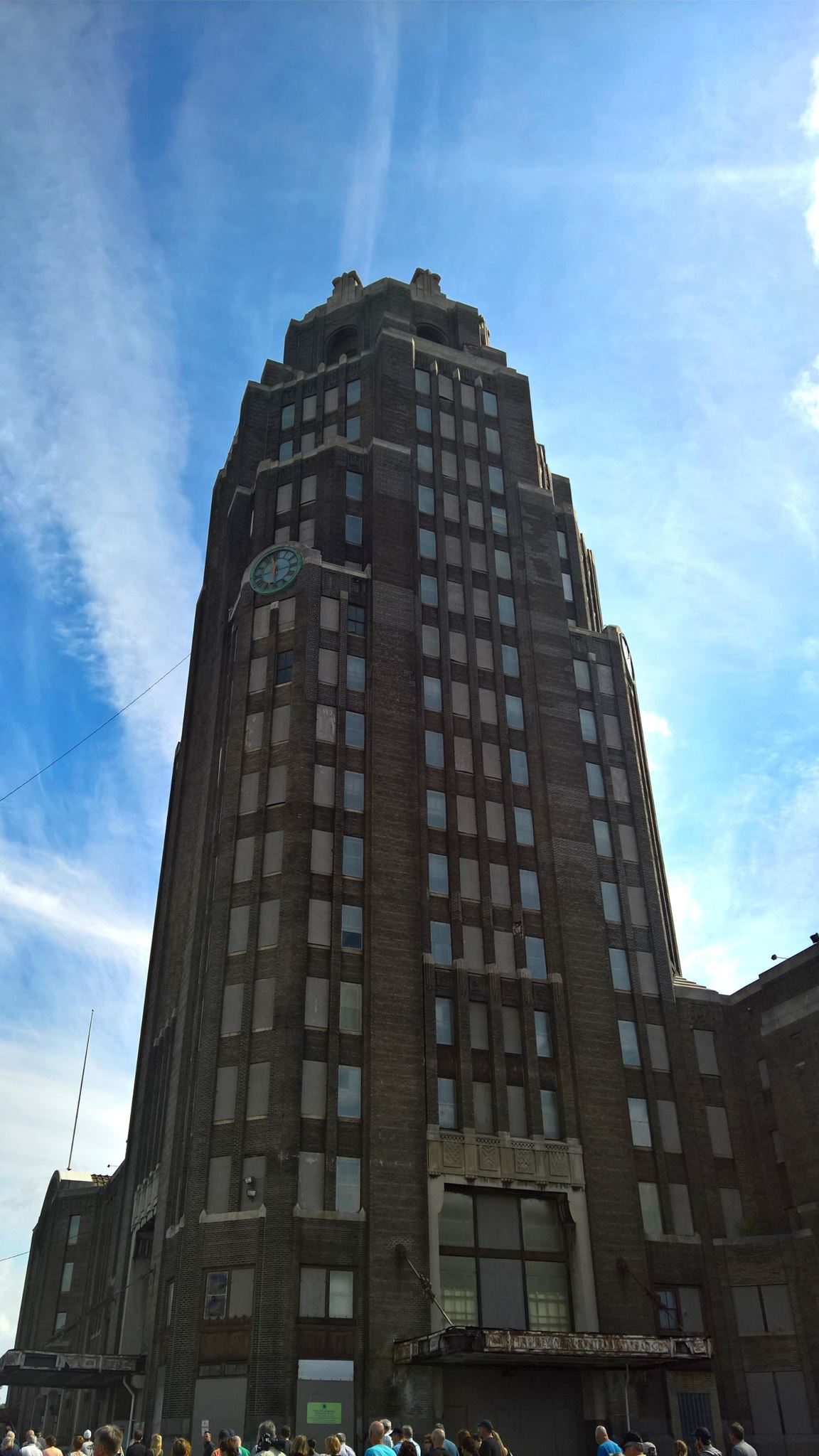
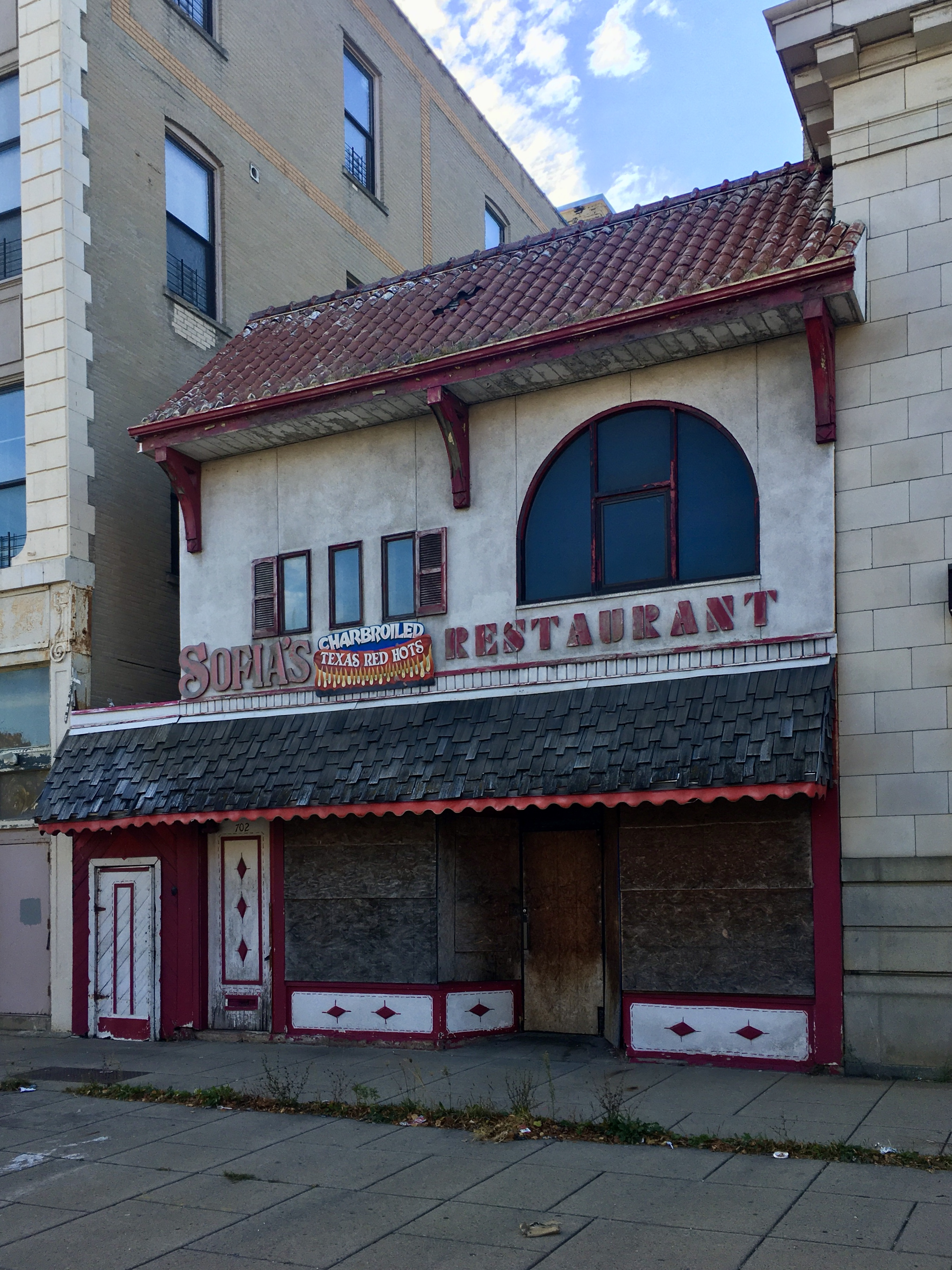
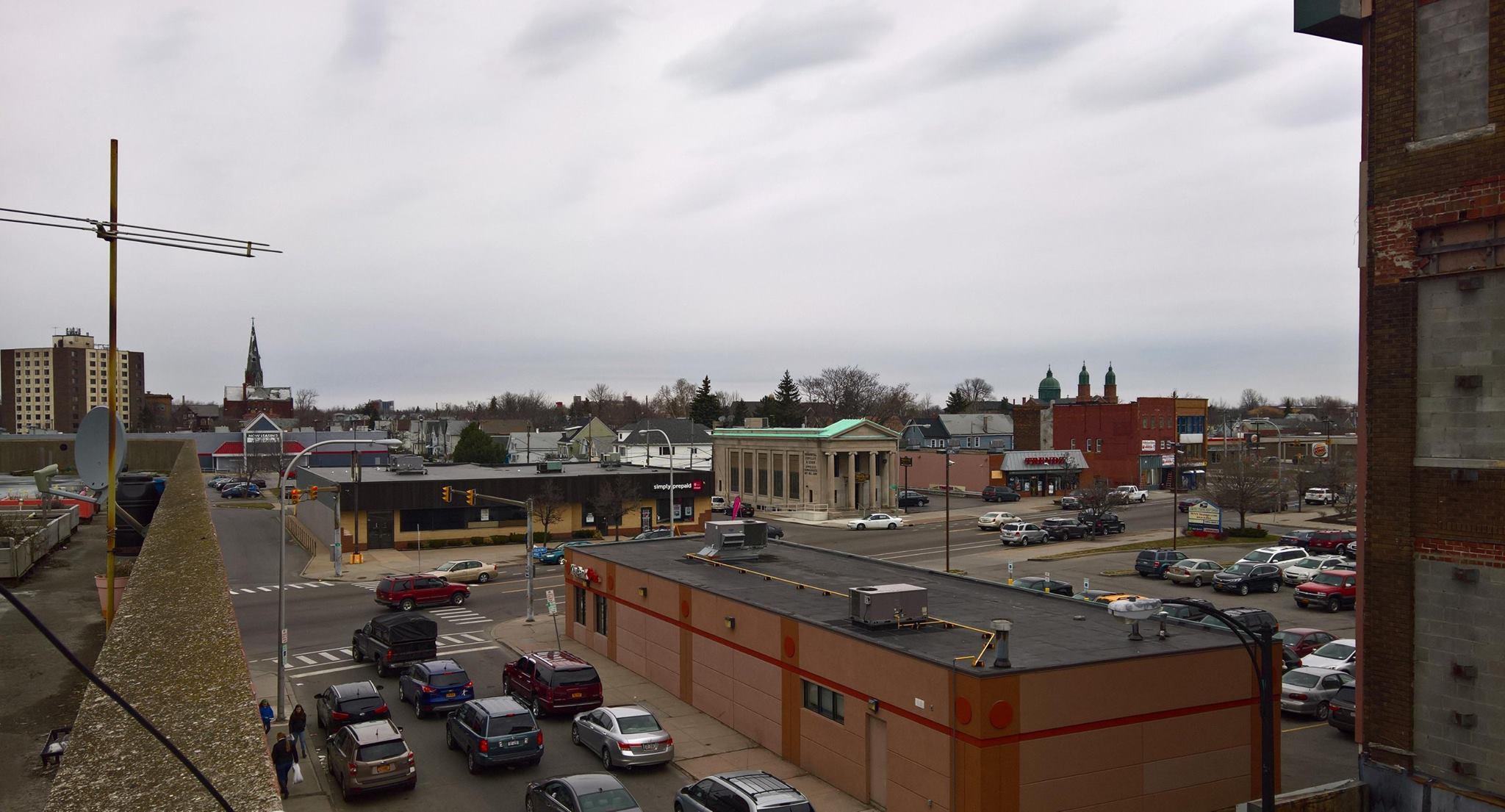
- Left to right from top: Fillmore Community Church, Revelation Missionary Baptist Church, Buffalo Central Terminal, 702 Fillmore Avenue, view atop Broadway Market
- Interactive map of Broadway-Filmore
- Country: United States
- State: New York
- City: Buffalo
- Named for: Polonia

Government
  - Council Member: Mitchell P. Nowakowski (D)

Broadway-Fillmore (formerly known as Polonia) is a neighborhood in Buffalo, New York, United States.

== Geography ==
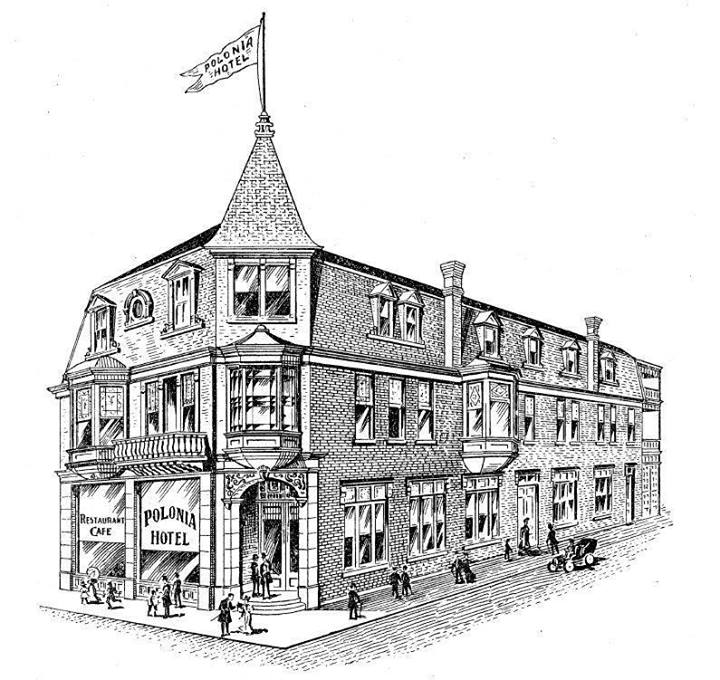
Sketch of the former Polonia Hotel in 1919 prior to remodeling.

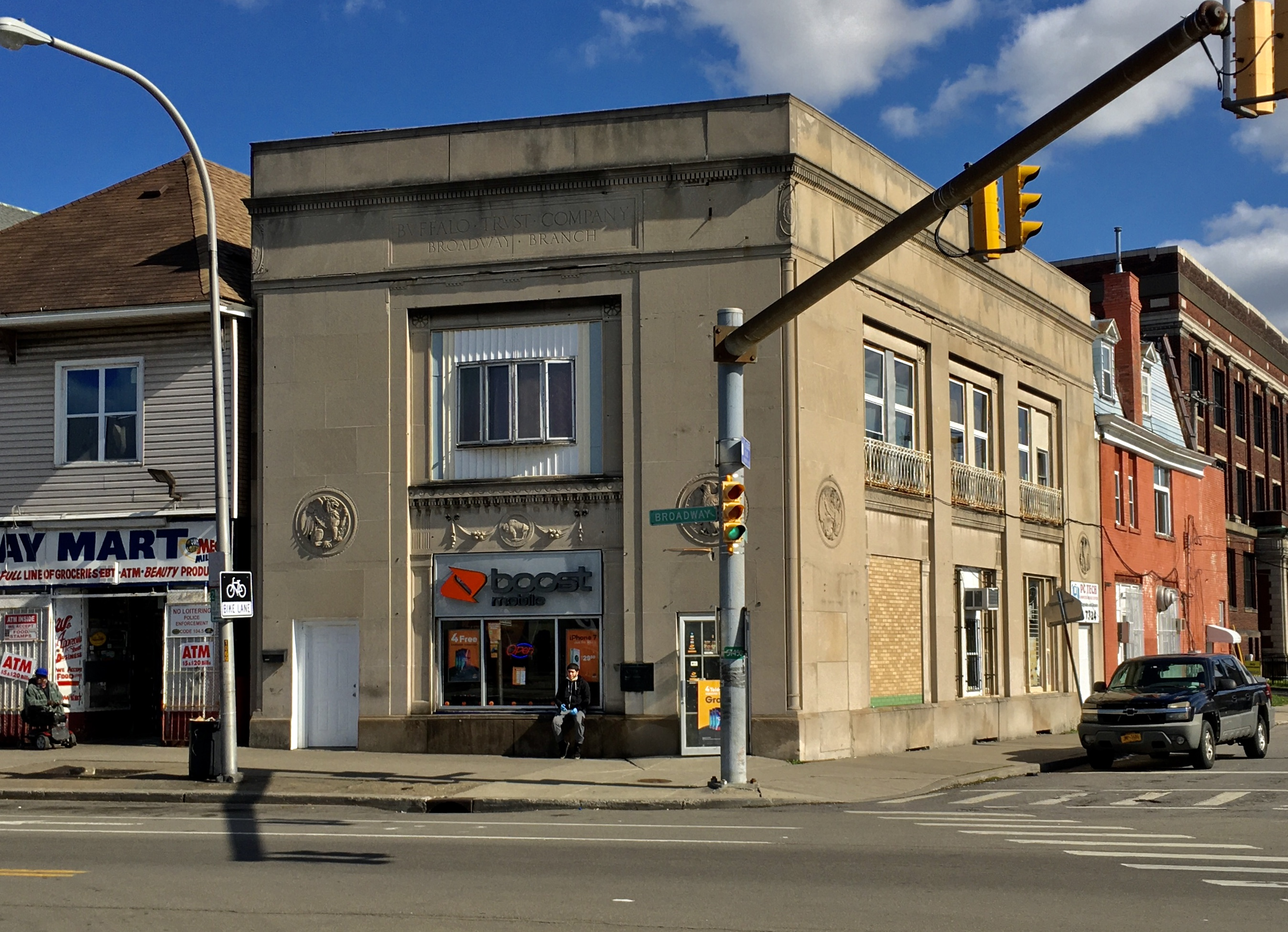
The same building pictured in 2020 after the 1919 remodeling.

Broadway-Fillmore is in the lower East Side of Buffalo. The neighborhood is centered along Broadway running west–east and Fillmore Avenue running north–south.

== History/Culture ==
Broadway-Fillmore was once home to a large Polish/Eastern European population in Buffalo. The neighborhood has long since fallen into poverty and disrepair in the mid-late 20th century.

Today a large African American population along with new immigrants are trying to breathe new life into the neighborhood.

Goo Goo Dolls lead singer John Rzeznik grew up here. The neighborhood later became inspiration for the song "Broadway".

== Notable sites ==
- Broadway Market
- Saint Adalbert Basilica
- Buffalo Central Terminal
- Corpus Christi Church
- Saint Stanislaus Church
- Saint John Kanty Church

== See also ==
- Neighborhoods of Buffalo, New York
