= Michael Norwood =

American police officer and retired basketball player

Personal information
- Born: July 6, 1985 (age 40) Buffalo, New York, U.S.
- Listed height: 6 ft 7 in (2.01 m)
- Listed weight: 240 lb (109 kg)

Career information
- High school: Seneca Vocational (Buffalo, New York)
- College: ECC (2003–2005); Coppin (2005–2007)
- NBA draft: 2007: undrafted
- Playing career: 2009–2012
- Position: Forward

Career history
- 2009–2010: Buffalo Stampede
- 2010: Äänekosken Huima
- 2012: Summerside Storm (drafted)

Career highlights
- All-Western New York (2003)

Michael Norwood is an American former basketball player who is currently a lieutenant with the Buffalo Police Department.

Norwood is one-half of the musical duo The Singing Cops with fellow officer Armonde "Moe" Badger, and they were contestants together on The Amazing Race 33.

== History ==
=== Playing career ===
Michael Norwood Jr. was born in Buffalo, New York, playing basketball for Seneca Vocational High School and receiving All-Western New York honors following his senior season in 2003.

He played for two seasons at Erie Community College under Alexander Nwora from 2003 to 2005. After transferring to Coppin State University in 2005, he played two seasons under Fang Mitchell before going undrafted in the 2007 NBA draft.

Norwood played professionally for the Buffalo Stampede for both of their seasons in the Premier Basketball League from 2009 to 2010.

After being signed by the Äänekosken Huima in Finland, Norwood injured his foot in training and was released by the club in September 2010 prior to their season opener. His father, Michael Norwood Sr. had been a star with the team in the 1970s.

He was selected in the third round of the 2012 NBL Canada draft by the Summerside Storm, but instead chose to retire in favor of a law enforcement career.

=== Law enforcement career and fame ===
Norwood was hired as a police officer by the Buffalo Police Department in January 2013.

A clip of Norwood and his partner Armonde "Moe" Badger singing "Thinking Out Loud" inside a restaurant went viral in March 2019, leading to the pair making national appearances as The Singing Cops. They appeared together on an April 2019 episode of The Ellen DeGeneres Show, with the host donating $10,000 to their C.O.P.S.S. (Children Overcoming Police Stereotypes Through Sports) foundation. The Singing Cops released a song titled "Different" in July 2009.

Norwood was placed on administrative leave in August 2019 following an incident where his patrol car collided with a motorcycle.

He began competing as a professional bodybuilder for the International Fitness and Bodybuilding Federation in July 2021.

Badger and Norwood appeared as contestants together on The Amazing Race 33 in January 2022, and were the first team eliminated.

Norwood was promoted to the rank of lieutenant by the Buffalo Police Department in November 2022.
