= List of NBL Canada statistical leaders by season =

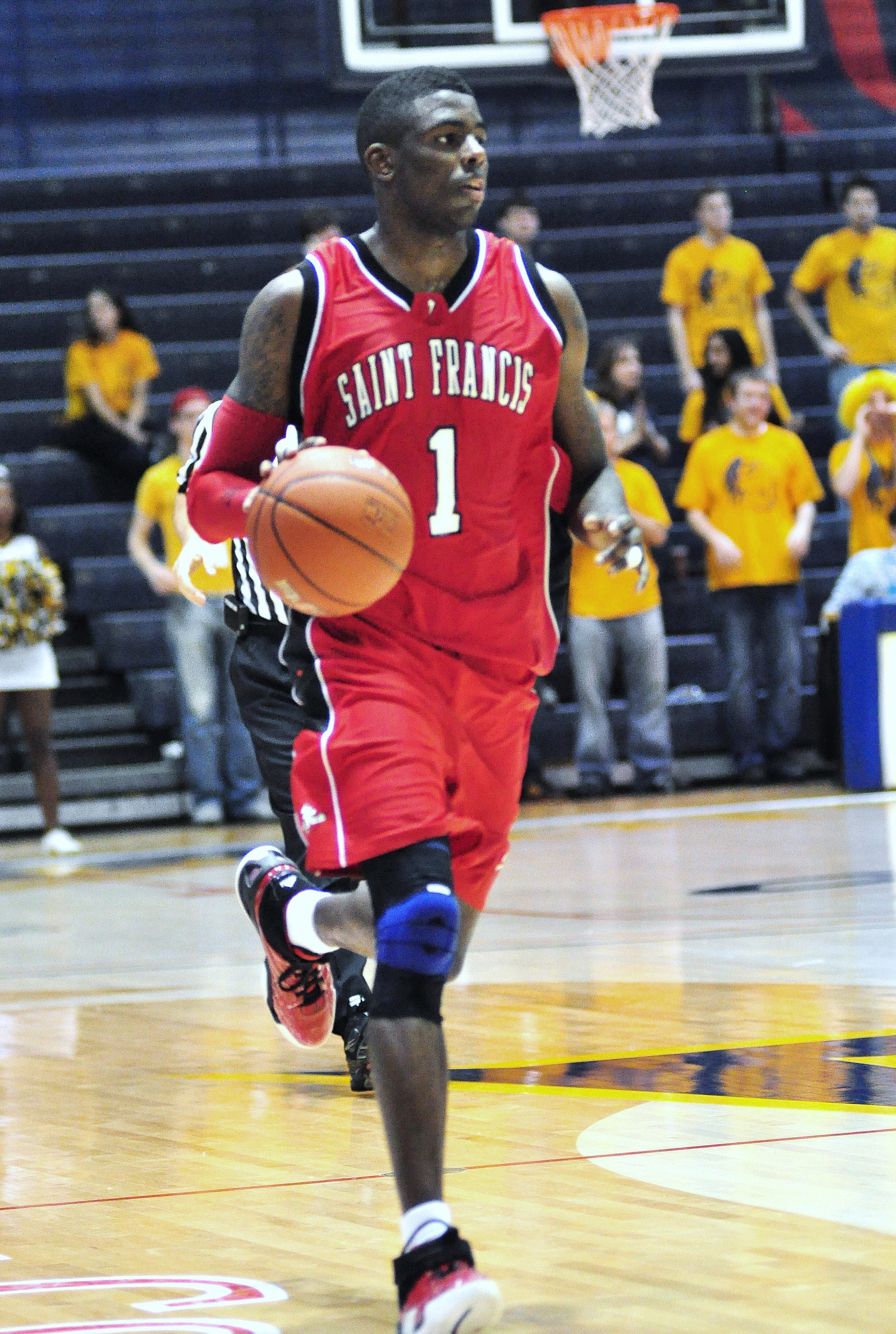
Devin Sweetney won the scoring title as well as the MVP award in 2013.

The National Basketball League of Canada is a Canadian professional men's basketball league that began play in 2011. Each season, players are recognized for leading in each of the five major statistical categories: points, rebounds, assists, steals, and blocks.

== Legend ==
†		Denotes player who won the MVP Award that year			
G	Guard	F	Forward	C	Center

== Points ==
In basketball, points are the sum of the score accumulated through free throws or field goals. The National Basketball League of Canada scoring title is awarded to the player with the highest points per game average after the season. The Saint John Mill Rats have had two players lead the league, Kenny Jones and Anthony Anderson, a league-high. Two of the four players, Devin Sweetney and Anderson, led the league in scoring won the NBL Canada Most Valuable Player Award that same season.

Season	Player	Age (Note: Age at the start of February 1st of that season)	Position (Note: The player's primary position is listed first)	Team	Games played	Field goals made	3-point field goals made	Free throws made	Total points	Points per game	Ref
2011–12	Brandon Robinson	22	G/F	Oshawa Power	36	245	71	154	715	19.9	
2012–13 †	Devin Sweetney	25	G/F	Moncton Miracles	40	305	114	277	1,001	25.0	
2013–14 †	Anthony Anderson	32	F	Saint John Mill Rats	39	314	116	197	941	24.1	
2014–15	Kenny Jones	30	F	Saint John Mill Rats	32	258	7	144	667	20.8	
2015–16	Logan Stutz	27	F	Niagara River Lions	37	295	50	160	800	21.6	
2016–17	Anthony Anderson (2)	35	PG	Saint John Riptide	34	273	98	157	801	23.6	
2017–18	Royce White	26	F	London Lightning	38	365	10	225	965	25.4	

== Rebounds ==
In basketball, a rebound is the act of gaining possession of the ball after a missed field goal or free throw. An offensive rebound occurs when a player recovers the ball after their own or a teammate's missed shot attempt, while a defensive rebound occurs when a player recovers the ball after an opponent's missed shot attempt. The National Basketball League of Canada's (NBL) rebounding title is awarded to the player with the highest rebounds per game average. The London Lightning have had three players lead the league in rebounding: Gabe Freeman, Stephen Maxwell, and Marvin Phillips. Freeman finished with the highest rebounding average in NBL Canada history in 2012.

Season	Player	Position	Team	Games played	Total rebounds	Rebounds per game	Ref
2011–12 †	Gabe Freeman	G/F	London Lightning	35	425	12.14	
2012–13	Antonio Ballard	G	Summerside Storm	31	321	10.35	
2013–14	Tim Parham	C	Windsor Express	40	429	10.73	
2014–15	Marvin Phillips	F	London Lightning	32	341	10.66	
2015–16	Stephen Maxwell	F	London Lightning	39	462	11.85	
2016–17	Juan Pattillo	F	Windsor Express	27	286	10.59	
2017–18	Derek Hall	F/C	KW Titans	39	454	11.6	

== Assists ==
In basketball, an assist is a pass to a teammate that directly leads to a score by field goal. The National Basketball League of Canada's (NBL) assist title is awarded to the player with the highest assists per game average in a given season. Darren Duncan, who played with the Windsor Express for two seasons, leads the league with two such titles.

Season	Player	Position	Team	Games played	Total assists	Assists per game	Ref
2011–12	Darrell Wonge	G/F	Moncton Miracles	36	196	2.94	
2012–13	Darren Duncan	G	Windsor Express	40	319	7.98	
2013–14	Darren Duncan (2)	G	Windsor Express	36	310	8.61	
2014–15	Raheem Singleton	G	Saint John Mill Rats	20	146	7.30	
2015–16	Da’Quan Brooks	PG	Orangeville A's	23	201	8.74	
2016–17	Maurice Jones	PG	Windsor Express	40	320	8.00	
2017–18	Jaylon Tate	PG	Niagara River Lions	43	327	7.7	

== Steals ==
In basketball, a steal is a "defensive action" that causes the opponent to turn the ball over. The National Basketball League of Canada's (NBL) steal title is awarded to the player with the highest steals per game average in a given season. The most recent leader was Kevin Young of the Halifax Rainmen, who won the Defensive Player of the Year Award the same season.

Season	Player	Position	Team	Games played	Total steals	Steals per game	Ref
2011–12	Morgan Lewis	G	Oshawa Power	25	57	2.28	
2012–13	Manix Auriantal	G	Montreal Jazz	26	56	2.15	
2013–14	Jujuan Cooley	G	Halifax Rainmen	39	109	2.79	
2014–15	Kevin Young	F	Halifax Rainmen	25	54	2.16	
2015–16	Tony Bennett	G	Windsor Express	36	82	2.28	
2016–17	Rahlir Hollis-Jefferson	PG	Orangeville A's	35	76	2.17	
2017–18	Maurice Jones	PG	Windsor Express	43	98	2.3	

== Blocks ==
In basketball, a block (short for blocked shot) occurs when a defender deflects or stops a field goal attempt without committing a foul. The National Basketball League of Canada's (NBL) block title is awarded to the player with the highest blocks per game average in a given season. Cavell Johnson, who played with the Brampton A's for two seasons, leads the league with two blocks titles.

Season	Player	Position	Team	Games played	Total blocks	Blocks per game	Ref
2011–12	Omari Johnson	F	Oshawa Power	36	57	1.58	
2012–13	Jonas Pierre	C	Montreal Jazz	22	57	2.59	
2013–14	Cavell Johnson	F	Brampton A's	40	66	1.65	
2014–15	Cavell Johnson (2)	F	Brampton A's	32	53	1.66	
2015–16	Anthony Stover	PF / C	Saint John Riptide	33	132	4.00	
2016–17	Sam Muldrow	PF	Niagara River Lions	26	80	3.08	
2017–18	Du'Vaughn Maxwell	PF	Island Storm	40	89	2.2	

== See also ==
- List of National Basketball League of Canada career scoring leaders
