= Jonas Pierre =

American basketball player (born 1980)

Free agent
- Position: Center

Personal information
- Born: May 30, 1980 (age 46)
- Listed height: 6 ft 11 in (2.11 m)
- Listed weight: 240 lb (109 kg)

Career information
- High school: Canarsie (Brooklyn, New York)
- College: Long Beach CC (2000–2001); Western Nebraska CC (2001–2002); Lincoln (MO) (2002–2004)
- NBA draft: 2004: undrafted
- Playing career: 2004–2014

Career history
- 2009: Quebec Kebs
- 2009: Venice Beach Warriors
- 2011: Terceira Basket
- 2012: Moncton Miracles
- 2013: Montreal Jazz
- 2014: Saint John Mill Rats

Career highlights
- NBL Canada blocks leader (2013); Second-team All-NBL Canada (2013); PBL co-Defensive Player of the Year (2009); PBL blocks leader (2009)

Jonas Farley Pierre (born May 30, 1980) is an American professional basketball player. A center, he has played with three teams in the National Basketball League of Canada (NBL). Pierre last played with the Saint John Mill Rats in Canada.

== Collegiate career ==
Pierre started played college basketball with Long Beach City College in Long Beach, California and transferred to Western Nebraska Community College for his sophomore season. He then joined Lincoln University in Missouri for his third year. In the summer of 2003, he signed a letter of intent to play with Nicholls State in the NCAA Division I. However, he returned to Lincoln the following season.

== Professional career ==
Pierre joined the Quebec Kebs and played in the Premier Basketball League (PBL) for the 2008–2009 season. By the end of the season, he was averaging 8.6 rebounds and 3.0 blocks in 22.0 minutes per game. He recorded career-bests of 11 blocks on January 4 and 21 rebounds on January 25, both against the Manchester Millrats. Pierre led the PBL in blocks and ranked sixth in rebounds. He was named co-Defensive Player of the Year with Al Stewart of the Millrats.

Pierre played with the Venice Beach Warriors of the International Basketball League (IBL) in 2009. On May 2, he recorded a season-high 12 rebounds in a win over the Bellingham Slam. He scored a career-best 22 points against Edmonton Energy in his season finale on May 9, 2009. Pierre finished the year averaging 6.3 points and 8.0 rebounds.

Pierre competed for Terceira Basket of the Portuguese League in nine games in 2011. He notched season-highs of 15 points and 15 rebounds against S.C. Lusitânia on November 12. This was one of five contests in which he recorded over 10 rebounds. Pierre also recorded 3 or more blocks on four occasions.

On January 23, 2012, Pierre debuted in the National Basketball League of Canada (NBL) for the Moncton Miracles. He grabbed one rebound and scored no points in four minutes. However, he recorded 6 points, 9 rebounds, and 1 block in the following contest.

Pierre returned to Canada on January 1, 2013, when he moved to the Montreal Jazz and contributed 6 points, 3 blocks, and 15 rebounds in a win over the Windsor Express. He had another 10-rebound game on January 18, against the Summerside Storm, when he finished with 13. On February 23, 2013, vs the Halifax Rainmen, Pierre recorded his first double-double of the season, as he notched 10 points and 17 rebounds. However, his team had a 2–18 record while he was on the court. Pierre finished the season on an All-NBL Canada Team and led the league in blocks, averaging 2.59 per game.

Pierre took part in his third NBL Canada season with the Saint John Mill Rats. He made his debut by posting 2 points against the Island Storm on January 16, 2014. On February 6, Pierre recorded a season-best 5 rebounds. However, he played for fewer than 20 minutes in all eight of his games.

After retirement, Pierre started coaching at St. Patrick's High School. After his first year, he led his team to a third-place finish!

In 2015, he joined the Cégep of Sainte-Foy women basketball team as an assistant coach. He won his first gold medal at the RSEQ provincial championship.
