= List of NBL Canada All-Stars =

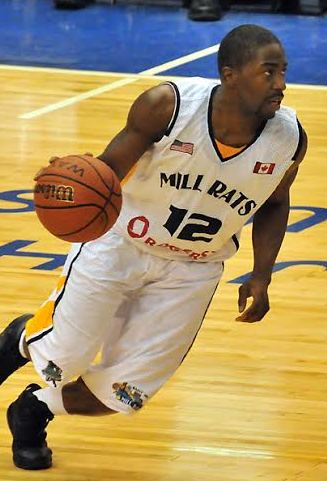
Anthony Anderson is one of the few players to be named All-Star two times

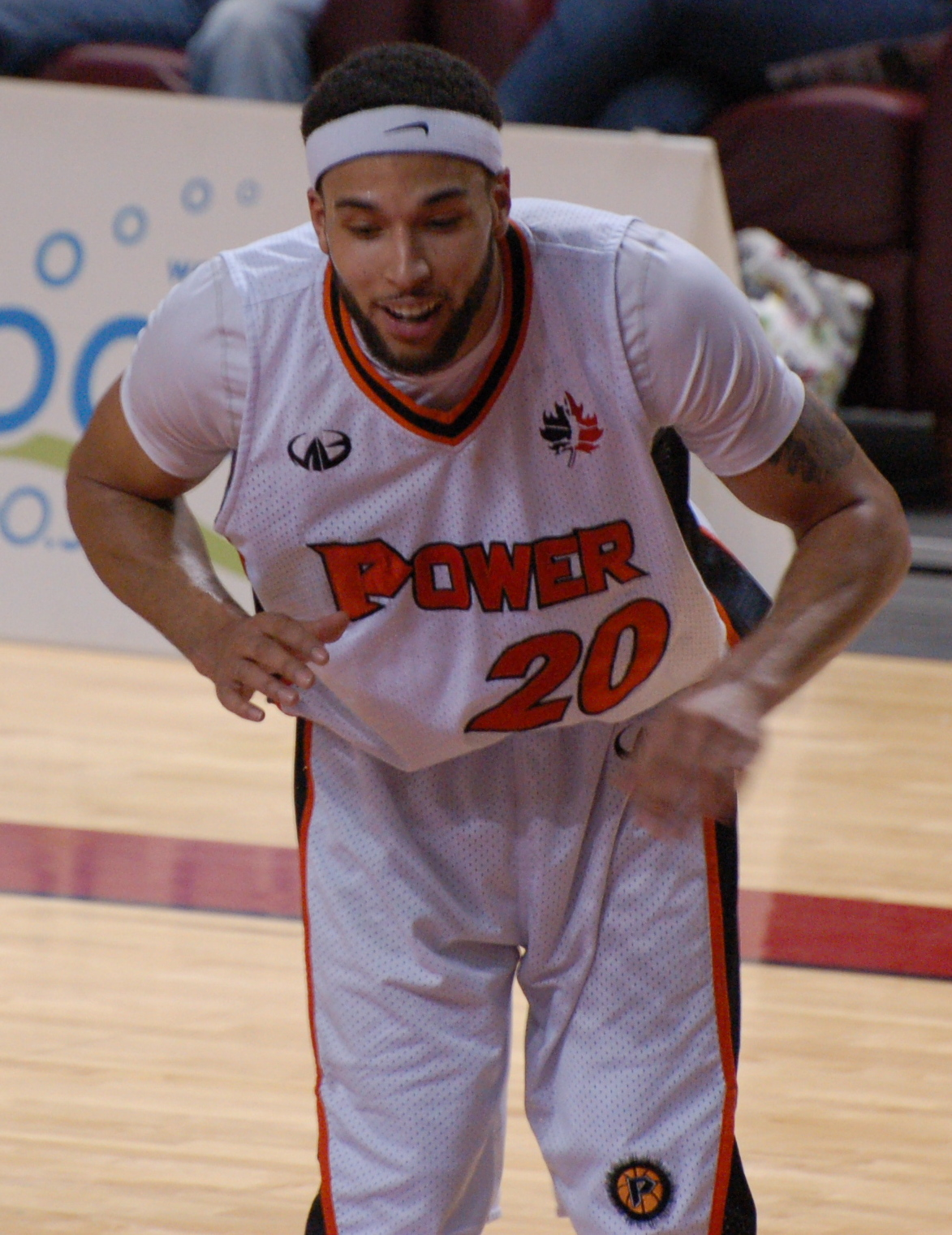
Morgan Lewis was named an All-Star as a rookie

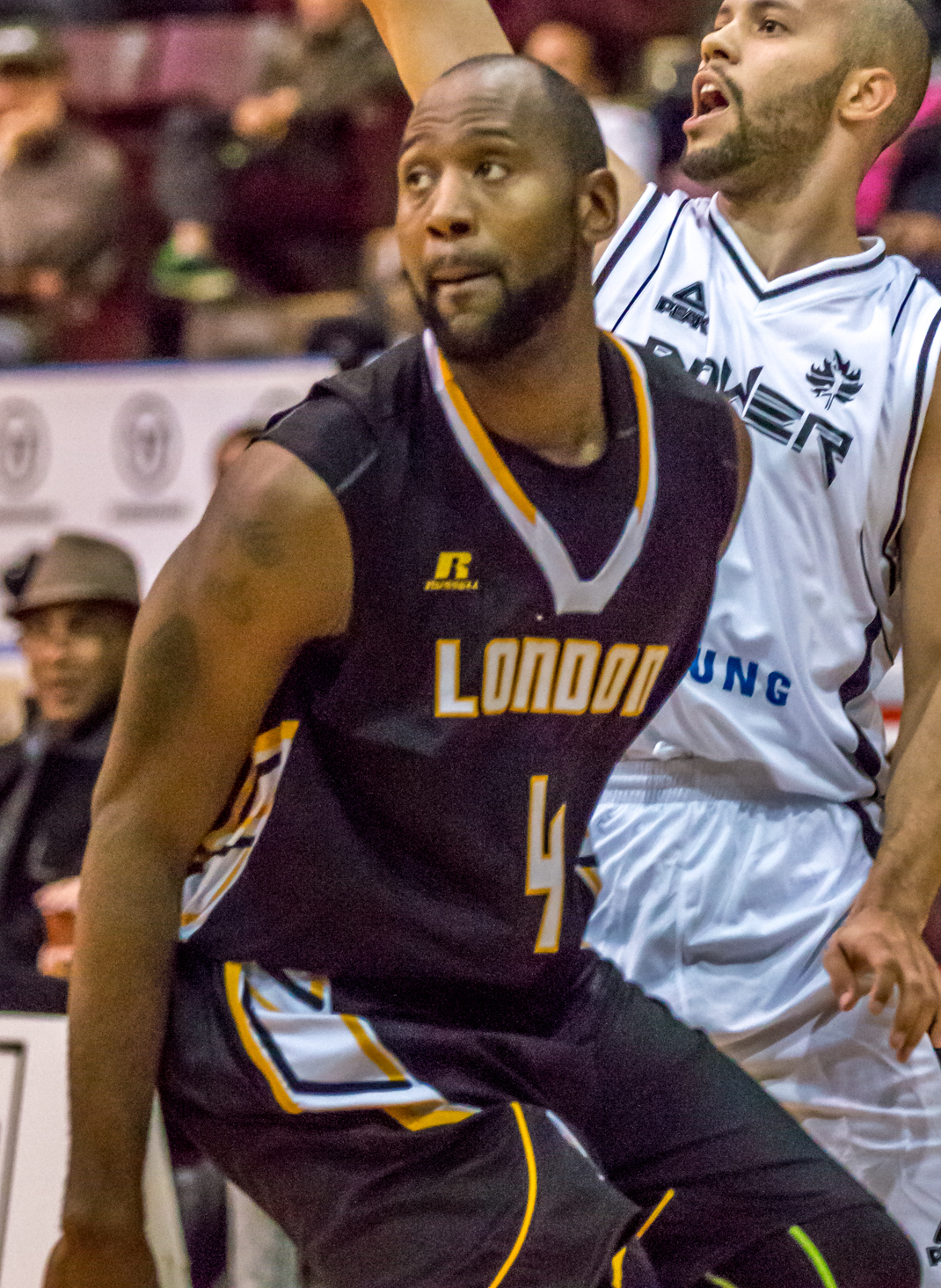
Elvin Mims was an All-Star in 2013

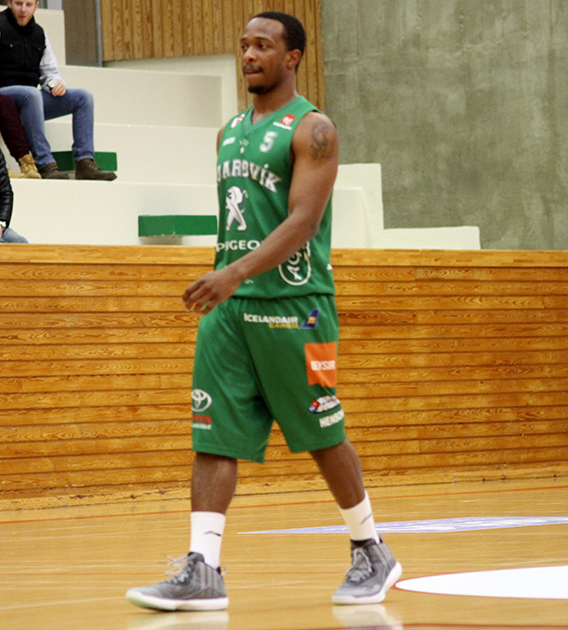
All-Star Stefan Bonneau lifted the Windsor Express to a title.

The National Basketball League of Canada (NBLC) All-Star Game was an annual exhibition basketball played between the Central and Atlantic division All-stars. Ten players—five starters and five reserves—from each division are chosen from the league's rosters. The following is a list of NBL Canada All-Stars, players who have been selected by the coaches to compete in All-Star Weekend. The All-star game was held three times between 2012 and 2014, although no player has played in all three All-Star Games. Ten players have competed at this stage on two occasions. Joey Haywood and Eddie Smith were the captains of the 2012 game, in which the All-Stars were divided into teams regardless of which division their team played in.

Player	Num	Selections	Notes
Anthony Anderson	2	2012, 2014	
Antonio Ballard	2	2013–2014	
Chris Cayole	2	2012–2013	
Chris Commons	2	2013–2014	
Darren Duncan	2	2012–2013	
Joey Haywood	2	2012–2013	Named captain of 2012 game
Omari Johnson	2	2012–2013	
Morgan Lewis	2	2012, 2014	
Nick Okorie	2	2013–2014	
Brandon Robinson	2	2012–2013	
Ryan Anderson	1	2014	
Yannick Anzuluni	1	2012	Missed 2012 game
Antwi Atuahene	1	2013	
Stefan Bonneau	1	2014	
DeAnthony Bowden	1	2012	
Taliek Brown	1	2012	
Kamar Burke	1	2013	
Isaac Butts	1	2013	
Cliff Clinkscales	1	2014	
Jerice Crouch	1	2013	
Steve DeLuca	1	2013	
Tim Ellis	1	2013	
Olu Famutimi	1	2014	
Gabe Freeman	1	2012	
J. R. Harrison	1	2013	
Doug Herring	1	2014	
Ralphy Holmes	1	2012	
Boo Jackson	1	2012	
Cordell Jeanty	1	2014	
Alex Johnson	1	2014	
Cavell Johnson	1	2014	
Jermaine Johnson	1	2014	
Kenny Jones	1	2013	Missed 2013 game
Isaac Kuon	1	2012	
Trayvon Lathan	1	2012	
Tyrone Levett	1	2012	
Kevin Loiselle	1	2014	
Johnny Mayhane	1	2014	
Cedric Moodie	1	2014	
Elvin Mims	1	2013	
Papa Oppong	1	2013	
Tim Parham	1	2014	
Marvin Phillips	1	2013	
Stanley Robinson	1	2014	Missed 2014 game
Tut Ruach	1	2012	
Dwayne Smith	1	2014	
Eddie Smith	1	2012	Named captain of 2012 game
Al Stewart	1	2013	
Greg Surmacz	1	2013	
Devin Sweetney	1	2013	
Justin Tubbs	1	2014	Missed 2014 game
Ricky Volcy	1	2012	
Sylvania Watkins	1	2012	
Mike Williams	1	2012	
Garrett Williamson	1	2014	
Darrell Wonge	1	2012	
Lawrence Wright	1	2012	
