= 2012 NBL Canada draft =

The 2012 NBL Canada Draft was held on August 27, 2012, at the Rogers Centre. A total of 24 players were selected, in three rounds. Robert Curtis was selected with the first overall pick by the Windsor Express, to be traded to the Saint John Mill Rats, for fifth pick Mike Helms and the rights of Isaac Kuon.

== Draft ==
PG	Point guard	SG	Shooting guard	SF	Small forward	PF	Power forward	C	Center

Round	Pick	Player	Position	Nationality	Team	School/club team
1	1	Robert Curtis	C	United States	Windsor Express	Wayland Baptist University
1	2	Anthony Johnson	PF	United States	Moncton Miracles	Azusa Pacific
1	3	Brandon Hassell	PF/C	United States	Summerside Storm	Penn State
1	4	Chad Gillaspy	PF	United States	Oshawa Power	Evangel
1	5	Mike Helms	PG	United States	Saint John Mill Rats	Oakland
1	6	Adrian Moss	PG	United States	Quebec Kebs	Indianapolis
1	7	Avery Smith	PG	United States	Summerside Storm (from Halifax)	Wisconsin–Milwaukee
1	8	Kamar Burke	SG/SF	Canada	Moncton Miracles (from London)	British Columbia
2	9	Kevin Loiselle	SF	Canada	Windsor Express	Maine-Fort Kent
2	10	Terry Licorish	C	Canada	Moncton Miracles	McMaster
2	11	Reginald Robinson	PG	United States	London Lightning	Northwest Missouri State
2	12	Amani Daanish	PF	United States	Oshawa Power	Indiana State
2	13	Darin Mency	PG	United States	Saint John Mill Rats	Merrimack
2	14	Travis Cohn	PG	United States	Quebec Kebs	Jacksonville
2	15	Courtland Bluford	PG	United States	Halifax Rainmen	Assumption
2	16	Jerome Richardson	SF	United States	London Lightning	Louisiana Tech
3	17	Wayne Portalatin	C	United States; Puerto Rico	Windsor Express	UTEP
3	18	Collin Whitely	SF	Canada	Moncton Miracles	George Brown
3	19	Michael Norwood	SF	United States	Summerside Storm	Coppin State
3	20	Jamaal Smith	PG	United States	Oshawa Power	New Mexico
3	21	Taneiko Robinson	SF	United States	Saint John Mill Rats	Palomar
3	22	Emmanuel Trinquier	G	Canada	Quebec Kebs	La Cité
3	23	Brandon Bush	SG	United States	Summerside Storm (from Halifax)	Texas State
3	24	Obinna Agomo	PG/SG	Nigeria; United States	London Lightning	Greenville
