= Ricky Volcy =

Canadian basketball player

Personal information
- Born: September 29, 1982 (age 44) Montreal, Quebec
- Listed height: 6 ft 8 in (2.03 m)
- Listed weight: 235 lb (107 kg)

Career information
- High school: Duboise (Montreal, Quebec)
- College: Northern Michigan (2003–2007)
- Playing career: 2007–2016
- Position: Power forward / center
- Number: 32

Career history
- 2007–2008: Aguas de Valencia
- 2010–2011: UJAP Quimper 29
- 2011–2012: Quebec Kebs
- 2012: JL Bourg-en-Bresse
- 2012: Montreal Jazz
- 2012–2013: BBC Nyon
- 2014–2016: Saint John Riptide

Career highlights
- NBL Canada All-Star (2012); GLIAC Player of the Year (2007); 3× First-team All-GLIAC (2005–2007)

Jean-Richard "Ricky" Volcy (born September 29, 1982) is a Canadian former professional basketball player. He last played for the Saint John Riptide of the National Basketball League of Canada (NBL). He was inducted into the Northern Michigan University Sports Hall of Fame in 2015.

== Collegiate career ==
Following a season of prep school, Volcy came to Northern Michigan University to play college basketball alongside his brother, Marco. He would later say, "Going to Northern Michigan was the best decision I ever made in my life. The day I signed that letter of intent was the best thing I have ever done. Because of Northern, I have been able to do so many things with my life and live my dream. I became a better man and a better person because of my time at Northern Michigan. I owe everything to NMU."

As a freshman, Volcy was a starter in 9 of his 22 games and averaged 11.5 points and 6.5 rebounds in 23.9 minutes per game. In the following season, he led his team in both scoring and rebounding, averaging 19.8 and 7.7 respectively. He led the Great Lakes Intercollegiate Athletic Conference (GLIAC) in points and started in all 28 of his team's contests. In his junior year, Volcy was the team's leader in points, steals, and blocks, and only his brother recorded more rebounds. A league leader in blocked shots and a first team All-GLIAC selection, he was named NMU Athlete of the Year.

By the end of his final season with the Wildcats, Volcy averaged a team-high 22.5 points and 9.6 rebounds and was named GLIAC Player of the Year. He garnered NCAA and NABC All-American honors, participated in the NABC/NCAA Division II All-Star game, and was named the school's Athlete of the Year for a second straight season. In 2015, he was inducted into the NMU Sports Hall of Fame.

== Professional career ==
Volcy signed with the Quebec Kebs for the team's 2011–12 season. He averaged 11.4 points and 6.4 rebounds per game. With BBC Nyon of Switzerland, he averaged 14.1 points and 7.5 rebounds per game. On January 5, 2015, Volcy returned to the NBL Canada to play for the Saint John Mill Rats.
