= NBL Canada Rookie of the Year Award =

The National Basketball League of Canada's Rookie of the Year Award is an annual National Basketball League of Canada (NBL) award given to the top rookie of the regular season. From 2012 to 2014, the league announced the honoree during All-Star Weekend.

== Winners ==
Season	Player	Position	Nationality	Team
2011–12	Brandon Robinson	Forward	United States	Oshawa Power
2012–13	Isaac Butts	Center	United States	Moncton Miracles
2013–14	Raven Barber	Forward / center	United States	Halifax Rainmen
2014–15	Rashad Whack	Guard	United States	Island Storm
2015–16	Stephen Maxwell	Forward	United States	London Lightning
2016–17	Maurice Jones	Guard	United States	Windsor Express
2017–18	Jaylon Tate	Guard	United States	Niagara River Lions
2018–19	Frank Bartley	Guard	United States	Saint John Riptide
2019–20	Antwon Lillard	Forward	United States	Island Storm
2020-21	Not awarded — Season cancelled due to COVID-19 pandemic.			
2022	Shakwon Barrett	Guard	Canada	KW Titans
