= Chris Commons (basketball) =

American basketball player (born 1984)

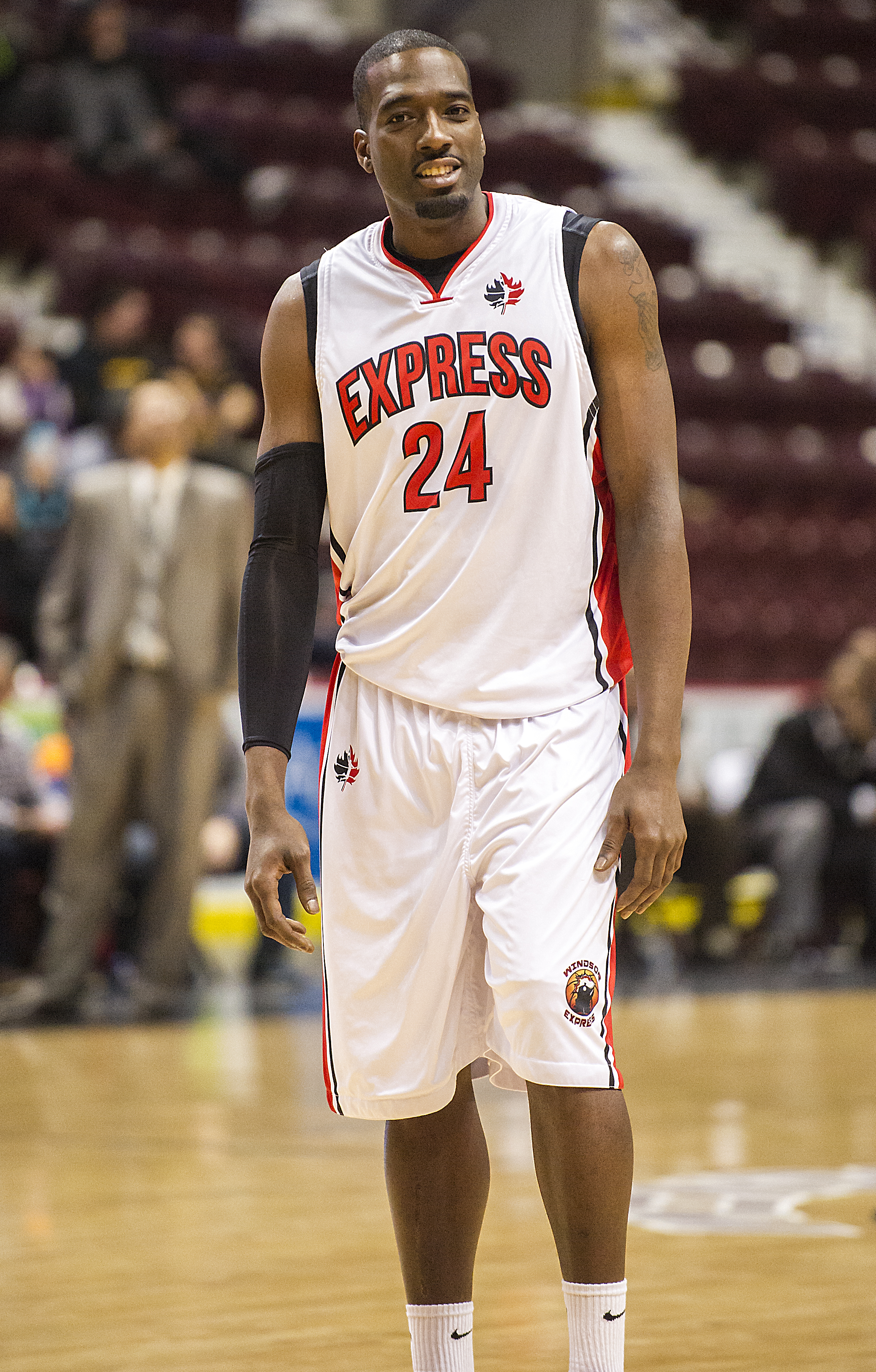
- Commons in 2016

Free agent
- Position: Forward

Personal information
- Born: December 8, 1984 (age 41) Toledo, Ohio, U.S.
- Listed height: 6 ft 9 in (2.06 m)
- Listed weight: 220 lb (100 kg)

Career information
- High school: Central Catholic (Canton, Ohio)
- College: Findlay (2003–2005); USC Aiken (2007–2009)
- NBA draft: 2009: undrafted
- Playing career: 2009–present

Career history
- 2009–2010: Al Ittihad
- 2010: BSV Wulfen
- 2010–2011: Brunei Barracudas
- 2011–2012: Scranton/Wilkes-Barre Steamers
- 2012: Korikobrat
- 2012–2016: Windsor Express
- 2016–2017: Niagara River Lions
- 2017: Rotterdam
- 2020: Windsor Express

Career highlights
- 2× NBL Canada champion (2014, 2015); NBL Canada All-Star (2013); 2× Peach Belt Player of the Year (2008, 2009); 2× First-team All-Peach Belt (2008, 2009); First-team All-GLIAC (2004)

Christopher Earl Commons (born December 8, 1984) is an American professional basketball player. Brought up in Toledo, Ohio, he played high school basketball at Central Catholic High School. Commons initially competed at the collegiate level for the University of Findlay before transferring to the University of South Carolina Aiken. At USC Aiken, he played in the NCAA Division II and earned all-league honors.

Upon his departure from college, Commons joined Al Ittihad in Bahrain. He then moved to Germany to play with BSV Wulfen. In 2010, he signed with the Brunei Barracudas in Southeast Asia. Commons returned to the US in 2011 to compete for the Scranton/Wilkes-Barre Steamers, only to finish the season with the Finnish club Korikobrat. For the following four years, he represented the Windsor Express of Canada, where he garnered All-Star accolades and won two championships.

== Early life and high school ==
Commons spent his childhood in Toledo, Ohio near his grandparents, but he was mainly looked after by his mother Rena. His father worked at a charter bus company and was absent for most of the year. Chris attended the Union Grove Missionary Baptist Church three times each week with his extended family. Commons started playing basketball in fourth grade, and he supposedly tried to improve his shooting skills early on by nailing a milk crate to a tree in his yard. He also watched Chicago Bulls games on television in his bedroom.

For middle school, Commons went to McTigue Junior High and played basketball on the school team. At the time, he was known as having a quiet personality, while his childhood friend and teammate Norman Mars was more verbal. Commons later attended Central Catholic High School in Canton, Ohio. In high school, he joined forces with Mars on the Central Catholic Irish basketball team, and the duo became the forefront of the team. Commons had a low impact in his first two years, but he rapidly rose to stardom starting in his junior season. As a senior, he was averaging team-highs of 21.3 points and 6.8 rebounds per game for the Irish. For the first half of his final season at Central Catholic, Commons was the top high school scorer in the city of Toledo.

== College career ==
=== Findlay ===
Commons played two seasons of college basketball with the Oilers of the University of Findlay on a full-ride scholarship. At Findlay, he improved as a shooter and developed physically in order to succeed against stronger NCAA Division II competition. On November 22, 2003, he led his team with six rebounds. Commons replicated the feat on January 29, 2004 to help the Oilers defeat Grand Valley State. In 32 games as a freshman, he averaged 7.7 points, 2.5 rebounds, and a team-high 0.8 blocks per game. Commons quickly became the leader of the team during his sophomore season. He debuted by scoring a career-high 30 points along with five rebounds in a win over Urbana on November 17, 2004. Commons posted 21 points against Ferris State on December 2, helping the Oilers prevail by two points. On February 19, 2005, he added 28 points to beat Ashland.

At the 2005 NCAA Division II Tournament, Commons led Findlay with 29 points and nine rebounds vs. Ferris State on March 15. The Oilers' victory put them in the Elite Eight round, but they would lose in their following contest. Commons lifted Findlay to the No. 1 ranking in Division II, and he pushed his team to a school-best 30–4 record by the end of the season. He averaged 15.5 points, 3.8 rebounds, and 1.6 blocks per game as a sophomore. Commons was also hoping to graduate early and double major in criminal justice and forensic science.

=== USC Aiken ===
In spite of his success at Findlay, Commons was suspended indefinitely from the school's basketball program on robbery charges in August 2005. Only two weeks after his release from jail in 2007, he began receiving offers to continue his career at colleges such as Columbus State, Grand Valley State, and Northwest Missouri State. Findlay, on the other hand, was not interested in having him back. He ultimately chose to finish his collegiate career at USC Aiken, where he would represent the Pacers under head coach Vince Alexander. The Pacers' coach was impressed by the new arrival's potential, and he "wanted to see him prove a lot of people wrong." Commons reflected, "I learned a lot of lessons, I've been through a lot of tough stuff and to be where I'm at now, I'm blessed."

The junior had an immediate impact on the Pacers, debuting with a career-best 38-point effort against Mars Hill on November 17, 2007. He also added 11 rebounds, four assists and two blocks, along with seven turnovers, in the win. As of February 2021, it was tied for the sixth-best scoring performance by a player in school history. On December 1, Commons recorded 31 points and 13 rebounds vs. Armstrong Atlantic. He posted 36 points and six rebounds on January 19, 2008, against Columbus State.

== Professional career ==
On October 5, 2009, Commons signed his first professional contract with Al Ittihad of the Bahraini Premier League. He received praise from Vince Alexander, who said, "Once again, as we always are for all our former players who sign professional contracts, we are excited for Chris and his family." Commons averaged about 35 points and 11 rebounds per game in Bahrain. However, he left the team in the following month. He returned to pro basketball on January 25, 2010, finishing the rest of the season with BSV Wulfen of the Basketball Regionalliga in Germany. He joined the team to replace Ryon Howard, who had suffered an injury earlier. He appeared in four games for BSV, averaging 24.4 points per game and shooting 57.9% from the field.

For the 2010–11 season, Commons signed with the Brunei Barracudas of the ASEAN Basketball League (ABL). Team manager Benny Ang had been keeping track of the player long before the deal was made. Commons would join Christopher Garnett as one of the team's two imports. In an early season loss to defending champions Philippine Patriots on October 16, 2010, he posted 17 points and 11 rebounds. On October 23, he scored a game-high 38 points against Satria Muda BritAma to lead the Barracudas to their first win of the season. He had another notable performance on November 10, when he recorded 37 points vs. the Singapore Slingers. Despite his scoring effort, the Barracudas fell, 74–81. By January 2011, after finishing with a 3–10 record, the team was eliminated from postseason contention.

On November 17, 2011, Commons was selected with the 11th overall pick by the Scranton/Wilkes-Barre Steamers in the 2011 Premier Basketball League (PBL) draft. He said, "I'm very excited. With all the basketball turmoil going on it's a blessing to get a chance to play basketball anywhere. Things have really taken off for me." He was seen by head coach John Bucci as a veteran who could lead the younger players on the roster. Commons joined teammates Vincent Sampson and Rob Robinson as one of the Steamers' top scorers. In his debut, a loss to the Rochester Razorsharks on December 31, he posted a season-high 34 points and six rebounds. On January 16, 2012, Commons recorded a double-double of 28 points and 11 rebounds vs. the Charleston Gunners. He broke the 30-point barrier for the second time on March 15, when he scored 32 points along with 12 rebounds to defeat the Lake Michigan Admirals. In a rematch the next day, Commons scored 33 points but was unable to capture the victory. At the end of the season, Commons averaged 19.3 points, 5.9 rebounds, 2.0 assists, and 1.9 blocks per game.

To start the 2012–13 season, Commons signed with Korikobrat, a Finnish club that competed in the Korisliiga. In his first game with the team, on October 3, 2012, he scored 19 points, grabbed six rebounds, and blocked three shots in a loss to Tampereen Pyrintö.

On August 11, 2017, Commons signed with Rotterdam Basketbal of the Dutch Basketball League (DBL). On December 24, Commons was released by Rotterdam after averaging 17 points and 7.9 rebounds per game.

== Personal ==
In August 2005, Commons was suspended indefinitely from the Findlay basketball team after being charged for robbery and complicity to commit robbery. Allegedly, he took part in three robberies, all of which involved a weapon. Oilers' head coach Ron Niekamp said, "It was devastating for us to lose a player of that caliber." Commons was accused of the crime along with Ronnell Scott and his cousins Carlton and John Jackson. He allowed them to use his sports utility vehicle without knowing their full intentions. Despite Commons' minimal involvement, Scott and the Jacksons largely blamed him for the incident. Commons said, "I never went in any store. I didn't mastermind it. I didn't need for nothing. I was on full scholarship. I come from a well taken care of family. I didn't ask for nothing." In January 2006, he began an eight-month sentence at the Correctional Reception Center near Columbus, Ohio. Commons was forced to complete 100 hours of community service, and he was ordered to four years of community control. In jail, he embraced his passion for cooking and often played basketball, scoring 69 points in one game. For one month after his release, Commons remained under house arrest.
