= Brandon Robinson (basketball) =

American basketball player (born 1989)

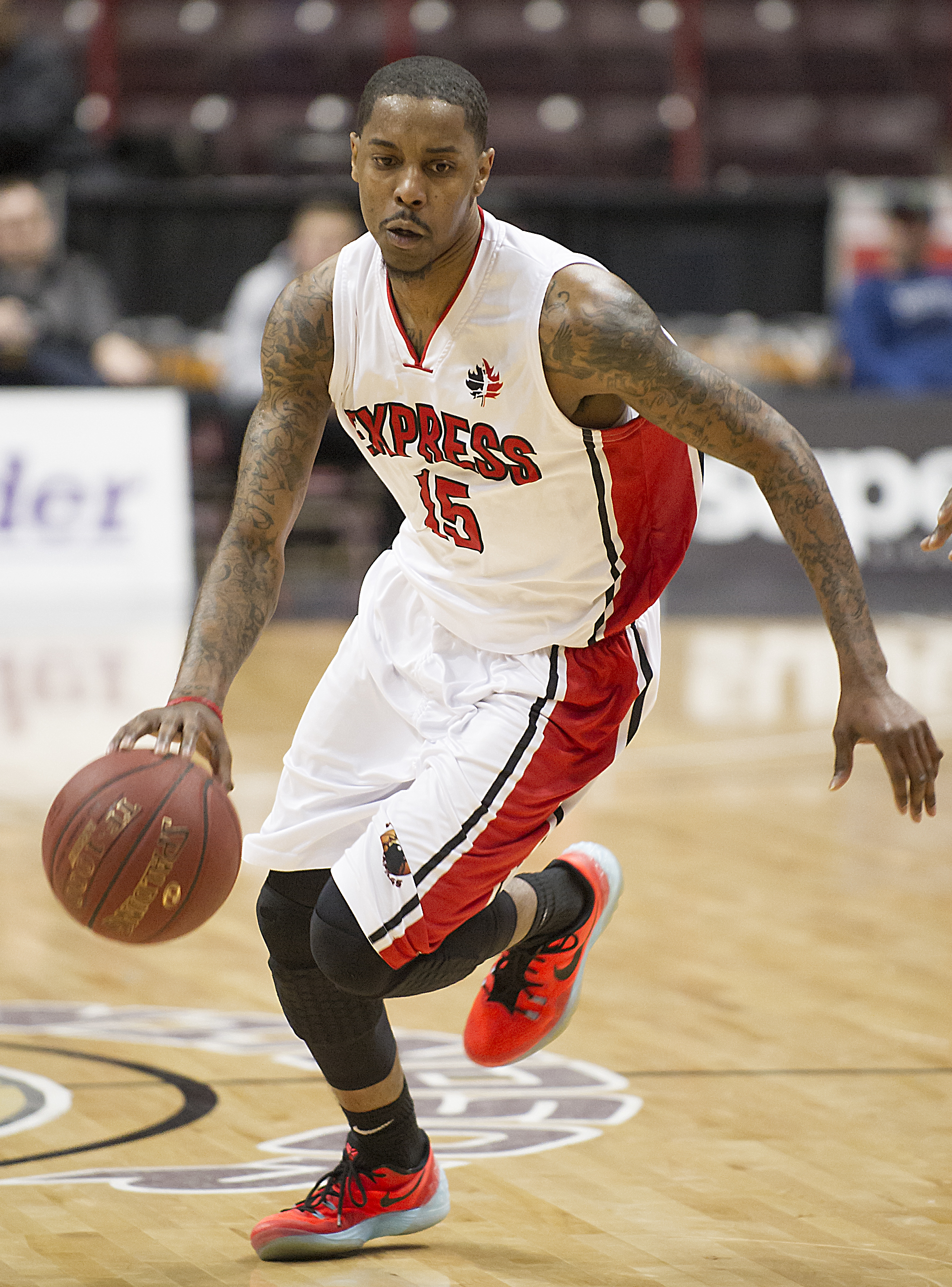
- Robinson with the Express in 2016

No. 15 – Diablos Rojos del México
- Position: Small forward
- League: LNBP

Personal information
- Born: March 25, 1989 (age 37) Lake Wales, Florida, U.S.
- Listed height: 6 ft 6 in (1.98 m)
- Listed weight: 200 lb (91 kg)

Career information
- High school: Lake Wales (Lake Wales, Florida)
- College: Seminole State (2007–2009); Clayton State (2009–2011)
- NBA draft: 2011: undrafted
- Playing career: 2011–present

Career history
- 2011–2012: Mississauga Power
- 2012: Cincinnati Slam
- 2012: Halifax Rainmen
- 2012–2013: Island Storm
- 2013–2014: Chemnitz 99
- 2014–2015: Island Storm
- 2015: Crailsheim Merlins
- 2016: Windsor Express
- 2016–2017: Club Osorno Básquetbol
- 2018: Club Deportes Las Animas
- 2018: Hebei Xianglan
- 2019: Club Deportes Las Animas
- 2019: Hebei Xianglan
- 2019–2020: Quimsa
- 2020: Astros de Jalisco
- 2021–2022: Flamengo
- 2023–2025: Quimsa
- 2026–present: Diablos Rojos del México

Career highlights
- FIBA Intercontinental Cup champion (2022); 2× BCL Americas champion (2020, 2024); 2× BCL Americas MVP (2020, 2024); Chilean League champion (2018); Chilean Cup champion (2018); Chilean Player of the Year (2018); All-NBL Canada Defensive Team (2016); First-team All-NBL Canada (2013); NBL Canada All-Star (2012, 2013); NBL Canada Forward of the Year (2013); NBL Canada Rookie of the Year (2012); NBL Canada All-Star Game MVP (2012); NBL Canada scoring champion (2012); Second-team All-NBL Canada (2012); First-team All-Peach Belt (2011)

Brandon Robinson (born March 25, 1989) is an American professional basketball player. Robinson played with Seminole State College of Florida and Clayton State University at the college level. He began his professional career in Canada where he was named NBL Canada Rookie of the Year and All-Star Game Most Valuable Player in 2012.

Robinson went on to make a name for himself playing for several clubs in the Americas. With Argentinian club Quimsa, he was a two-time BCL Americas champion and the only player to win the league's MVP award twice, in 2020 and 2024. He also won the 2022 FIBA Intercontinental Cup while playing with Flamengo.

== High school career ==
Robinson attended Lake Wales High School in Lake Wales, Florida. He played two seasons of varsity basketball and acted as the team captain as a senior. In his final year with Lake Wales, Robinson averaged 14 points and the team finished with a 21–5 record.

== College career ==
In his first two years of college, Robinson attended Seminole Community College in Sanford, Florida, where he played college basketball under head coach Bobby Washington. After his freshman season, he averaged 12 points and four rebounds, shooting .490 on field goals. Robinson averaged 18 points and six rebounds as a sophomore and earned first-team FCCAA All-Mid-Florida Conference and second-team NJCAA All-Region accolades.

Before his junior year, Robinson transferred to Clayton State University in Morrow, Georgia. The school's basketball program competed in the NCAA Division II. After starting in all 29 of his games under head coach Gordon Gibbons, he averaged 14 points and 5 rebounds. Robinson recorded a career-high 21 points against Augusta State. He also notched a season-best nine rebounds vs. North Georgia. As a senior, Robinson averaged 20 points and six rebounds, shooting .432 from the field. He scored a career-high 31 points at the Peach Belt Conference Tournament. The forward earned first-team All-Peach Belt and NABC Division II All-Southeast Region honors following the season. In March 2011, Robinson was named a Division II All-American, becoming the first Clayton State player to do so under Gibbons and the second in school history.

== Professional career ==
=== Stint in Canada ===
In October 2011, Robinson was named to the 18-man training camp roster Oshawa Power, who would play in the inaugural 2011–12 National Basketball League of Canada (NBL) season. On October 30, he debuted for the Power, scored 16 points in a loss to the Quebec Kebs. He was named NBL Canada Player of the Week on January 30, 2012, after posting 34 points vs. the Saint John Mill Rats. He earned Player of the Week honors once again on February 20, following a season-high 37-point performance in a rematch with the Mill Rats. By the end of the season, Robinson averaged 19.6 points per game, making him the league's leading scorer. He was named Rookie of the Year as well. In April 2011, Robinson scored 38 points at the NBL Canada All-Star Game and was then named All-Star Game Most Valuable Player.

=== The Basketball Tournament (TBT) (2015–present) ===
In the summers of 2015, '16, and 2017, Robinson played in The Basketball Tournament on ESPN for Pedro's Posse. In 2016, he helped lead Pedro's Posse to the Super 16 Round in the tournament, averaging 17.8 points per game, also shooting 86 percent from the free-throw line. In 2017, Robinson scored 19 points in Pedro's Posse's first round loss to Team 23 by a score of 107–92.

=== Club Deportes Las Animas (2018) ===
Robinson signed with the Chilean basketball team, Club Deportes Las Animas. On November 5, 2017, Brandon Robinson scored 47 points on 14-of-23 shooting from the field in a 96–94 win over Osorno Básquetbol.

=== China (2018–2019) ===
Robinson signed with Hebei Kylins, a team that is playing in the NBL-China. On June 26, 2019, Robinson scored a career-high 70 points (including a career-high 13 3-pointers made) and grabbed a career-high 21 rebounds in a 117–139 loss to the Henan Golden Elephants.

=== Quimsa (2019–2020) ===
On August 13, 2019, Robinson signed with Atletica Quimsa of the Liga Nacional de Básquet. He helped the team win the regular season and averaged 18.3 points, 2.5 rebounds and 2.7 assists per game. Robinson and Quimsa won the 2019–20 BCL Americas to be crowned the continental champions of the Americas, and he was named MVP in the process.

=== Flamengo (2021–2022) ===
In the 2021–22 season, Robinson played with Brazilian club Flamengo of the Novo Basquete Brasil (NBB). He won the 2021 FIBA Intercontinental Cup with Flamengo.

=== Astros de Jalisco (2020) ===
In 2020, Robinson signed with Astros de Jalisco of the Liga Nacional de Baloncesto Profesional. In 14 games, he averaged 13.1 points, 2.8 rebounds and 2.1 assists per game. Robinson parted ways with the team on October 17.

=== Return to Quimsa (2023–present) ===
In December 2023, Robinson signed a new contract with Quimsa for a second stint with the team. On April 15, 2024, Robinson won his personal second BCL Americas championship following a 92–80 win over his former club Flamengo. He scored 23 points and had 9 rebounds and 5 assists in the final, and was named the BCL Americas MVP after the game. Robinson was the first player to win two MVP awards.

== Personal life ==
Brandon was born on March 25, 1989, to mother Trelliss Robinson. His uncle, Fred Dean, played football as an offensive lineman. Dean won Super Bowl XVII with the Washington Redskins. While growing up, Robinson looked up to Michael Jordan and supported the Orlando Magic. While at Clayton State University, he majored in integrated studies.
