= Boo Jackson =

American basketball player (born 1981)

Personal information
- Born: December 16, 1981 (age 44)
- Listed height: 6 ft 9 in (2.06 m)
- Listed weight: 225 lb (102 kg)

Career information
- High school: Perry (Pittsburgh, Pennsylvania)
- College: Eastern Michigan (2001–2005)
- NBA draft: 2006: undrafted
- Playing career: 2006–2012
- Position: Forward

Career history
- 2006–2007: Holland Blast
- 2007–2008: East Kentucky Miners
- 2009: Los Angeles D-Fenders
- 2009–2010: Bakersfield Jam
- 2010: Dakota Wizards
- 2011–2012: Laval Kebs

Career highlights
- NBL Canada All-Star (2013); NBL Canada All-Defence First Team (2012); All-CBA First Team (2008); CBA Newcomer of the Year (2008)

James "Boo" Jackson (born December 16, 1981) is an American retired basketball player.

== College career ==
Jackson played college basketball for Eastern Michigan.

== Professional career ==
After his graduation from Eastern Michigan, he played for the Holland Blast in the International Basketball League (IBL) and the East Kentucky Miners of the Continental Basketball Association (CBA), where he was named Newcomer of the Year and earned All-CBA First Team honors. He last played for the Laval Kebs of the National Basketball League of Canada (NBL), following a professional career that took him to countries such as the United Arab Emirates, Argentina, Venezuela, Germany, China, and Norway. In Canada, Jackson was named to the NBL Canada All-Star reserve team. Jackson also had a history in the NBA Development League, appearing for the Bakersfield Jam, Los Angeles D-Fenders, and Dakota Wizards from 2009 to 2010.

After retirement, Jackson relocated to Knoxville, TN opened “Boo Jacks Chick-N-Sack” Sports Lounge.”
