= Cedric Moodie =

American basketball player (born 1978)

Personal information
- Born: November 20, 1978 (age 47)
- Listed height: 6 ft 2 in (1.88 m)
- Listed weight: 180 lb (82 kg)

Career information
- High school: Washington (South Bend, Indiana)
- College: Ball State (1998–2001); Indianapolis (2001–2002)
- NBA draft: 2002: undrafted
- Playing career: 2002–present
- Position: Shooting guard

Career history
- 2008: Elkhart Express
- 2009–2010: Boca Juniors
- 2010–2011: Lanús
- 2011–2012: Quebec Kebs
- 2012: Quilmes
- 2012–2013: Halifax Rainmen
- 2013–2014: Brampton A's

Career highlights
- NBL Canada All-Star (2014); First-team All-NBL Canada (2014)

Cedric Moodie (born November 20, 1978) is an American professional basketball player who last played for the Brampton A's of the National Basketball League of Canada (NBL). He was an NBL Canada All-Star in 2014 and earned All-League honors for the 2013–14 season. Moodie has experience playing in multiple countries across the world outside of Canada, primarily Argentina. He played college basketball at Ball State for three years and capped his amateur career representing the University of Indianapolis.
