= 2012–13 NBL Canada season =

- League: National Basketball League of Canada
- Sport: Basketball
- Duration: November 2, 2012 – March 16, 2013 (regular season)
- Teams: 8

Draft
- Top draft pick: Robert Curtis
- Picked by: Windsor Express

Playoffs
- Atlantic champions: Summerside Storm
- Atlantic runners-up: Saint John Mill Rats
- Central champions: London Lightning
- Central runners-up: Windsor Express

Finals
- Champions: London Lightning
- Runners-up: Summerside Storm
- Finals MVP: Marvin Phillips (London Lightning)

NBL Canada seasons
- ← 2011–12 2013–14 →

The 2012–13 NBL Canada season was the second season of the National Basketball League of Canada. The regular season began on Friday, November 2, 2012, when the Summerside Storm hosted the Saint John Mill Rats. The regular season ended on Saturday, March 16, 2013. The playoffs started on March 19 and ended on April 12 when the London Lightning defeated the Summerside Storm in Game 4 of their series, 87–80, winning the Finals, 3–1 and to capture the franchise's second NBL Canada title. Marvin Phillips was named the Finals MVP.

== Preseason ==
Following the end of the 2011-12 NBL Canada season, the NBL Canada awarded Windsor, Ontario a franchise, named the Windsor Express, for the 2012–13 season. With the addition of the Express, the NBL Canada incorporated two four-team divisions, the Central and the Atlantic.

Later in the preseason, the Quebec Kebs relocated to Laval, Quebec and were renamed the Laval Kebs. However, the Keb's ownership folded the team before the start of the 2012–13 season. The NBL Canada replaced the Kebs with a franchise in Montreal, Quebec, named the Montreal Jazz.

=== Draft ===
The 2012 NBL Canada draft was held August 27, 2012. The Windsor Express had the first pick and selected center Robert Curtis.

== Teams ==
2012-13 National Basketball League of Canada
Division	Team	City	Arena	Capacity
Atlantic	Halifax Rainmen	Halifax, Nova Scotia	Halifax Metro Centre	10,500
Atlantic	Moncton Miracles	Moncton, New Brunswick	Moncton Coliseum	6,554
Atlantic	Saint John Mill Rats	Saint John, New Brunswick	Harbour Station	6,603
Atlantic	Summerside Storm	Summerside, Prince Edward Island	Credit Union Place	4,532
Central	London Lightning	London, Ontario	Budweiser Gardens	9,000
Central	Montreal Jazz	Montreal, Quebec	Centre Pierre Charbonneau	2,700
Central	Oshawa Power	Oshawa, Ontario	General Motors Centre	5,180
Central	Windsor Express	Windsor, Ontario	WFCU Centre	6,500

=== Map of teams ===
Atlantic Division Central Division

== Regular season ==
The regular season began on November 2, 2012 with the Saint John Mill Rats taking on the Summerside Storm. The number of games played by each team was increased to 40. The regular season ended on Saturday, March 16, 2013.

=== Standings ===
==== Overall ====
#	2012–13 NBL Canada Standings							
#	Team	W	L	GB	PCT	PF	PA	STK
1	xy-London Lightning	33	7	--	.825	108.8	97.0	L1
2	xy-Summerside Storm	26	14	7	.650	107.5	101.1	W7
3	x-Windsor Express	22	18	11	.550	98.5	97.2	W7
4	x-Saint John Mill Rats	20	20	13	.500	104.0	104.5	L1
5	x-Moncton Miracles	20	20	13	.500	101.0	99.5	W5
6	Halifax Rainmen	19	21	14	.475	101.7	101.4	L3
7	Oshawa Power	18	22	15	.450	103.5	106.0	L10
8	Montreal Jazz	2	38	31	.050	93.8	112.0	L21

==== By division ====
#	Atlantic Division				
#	Team	W	L	GB	PCT
1	xy-Summerside Storm	26	14	--	.650
2	x-Saint John Mill Rats	20	20	6	.500
3	x-Moncton Miracles	20	20	6	.500
4	Halifax Rainmen	19	21	7	.475

#	Central Division				
#	Team	W	L	GB	PCT
1	xy-London Lightning	33	7	--	.825
2	x-Windsor Express	22	18	11	.550
3	Oshawa Power	18	22	15	.450
4	Montreal Jazz	2	38	31	.050

Notes

- x – Clinched playoff spot
- y – Clinched division title

== Statistics leaders ==
=== Individual statistic leaders ===
Category	Player	Team	Statistics
Points per game	Devin Sweetney	Moncton Miracles	24.9
Rebounds per game	Isaac Butts	Summerside Storm	11.1
Assists per game	Darren Duncan	Windsor Express	8.3
Steals per game	Chris Hagan	Montreal Jazz	2.5
Blocks per game	Jonas Pierre	Moncton Miracles	2.59
Fouls per game	Sylvania Watkins	Moncton Miracles	3.9
FG%	Isaac Butts	Moncton Miracles	0.603
FT%	Jermaine Blackburn	London Lightning	0.883
3FG%	Jermaine Blackburn	London Lightning	0.472
Double-Doubles	Antonio Ballard	Summerside Storm	15
Triple-Doubles	N/A	N/A	N/A

== Awards ==
=== Yearly awards ===
- Most Valuable Player: Devin Sweetney, Moncton Miracles
- Canadian Player of the Year: Joey Haywood, Halifax Rainmen
- Defensive Player of the Year: Al Stewart, Summerside Storm
- Rookie of the Year: Isaac Butts, Moncton Miracles
- Sixth Man of the Year: Rodney Buford, London Lightning
- Newcomer of the Year: Marvin Phillips, London Lightning
- Coach of the Year: Micheal Ray Richardson, London Lightning/ Joe Salerno, Summerside Storm
- Expansion Franchise of the Year: Windsor Express
- Ian Fowler Executive of the Year: Kim Blanco, Moncton Miracles

- All-NBL Canada First Team:
  - F Brandon Robinson
  - F Elvin Mims
  - C Isaac Butts
  - G Devin Sweetney
  - G Darren Duncan
- All-NBL Canada Second Team:
  - F Quinnel Brown
  - F Tim Ellis
  - C Marvin Phillips
  - G Anthony Anderson
  - G Jerice Crouch
- All-NBL Canada Third Team:
  - F Chris Common
  - G Joey Haywood
  - G Al Stewart
  - G Antonio Ballard
  - G Nick Okorie

- NBL Canada All-Canada First Team:
  - F Kevin Loiselle
  - F Greg Surmacz
  - G Joey Haywood
  - G Antwi Atuahene
- NBL Canada All-Canada Second Team:
  - F Doug McKinney
  - F Kamar Burke
  - C Quincy Okolie
  - G Kevin Francis
  - G Papa Oppong

- NBL Canada All-Defensive First Team:
  - F Elvin Mims
  - F Kevin Loiselle
  - C Isaac Butts
  - G Antonio Ballard
  - G Al Stewart
- NBL Canada All-Defensive Second Team:
  - F Marvin Phillips
  - F Jaushay Rockett
  - C Jonas Pierre
  - G Sylvania Watkins
  - G Cavell Johnson

=== Players of the week ===
The following players were named the NBL Canada Players of the Week.

Week ending	NBL Canada Player of the Week	
Week ending	Player	Club
November 4	Tyrone Levett	Moncton Miracles
November 11	Greg Plummer	Summerside Storm
November 18	Morgan Lewis	London Lightning
November 25	Devin Sweetney	Moncton Miracles
December 3	Darren Duncan	Windsor Express
December 10	Quinnel Brown	Halifax Rainmen
December 17	Nick Okorie	Oshawa Power
December 24	Elvin Mims	London Lightning
December 31	Chris Commons	Windsor Express
January 7	Eric Frederick	Montreal Jazz
January 14	Devin Sweetney	Moncton Miracles
January 28	Anthony Anderson	Saint John Mill Rats
February 4	Melvin Goins	Halifax Rainmen
February 11	Marvin Phillips	London Lightning
February 18	Isaac Butts	Moncton Miracles
February 25	Marvin Phillips	London Lightning
March 4	Isaac Butts	Moncton Miracles
March 11	Omari Johnson	Summerside Storm
March 18	Kenny Jones	Saint John Mill Rats

== Playoffs ==
The NBL Canada Championship Playoffs began on March 19, with the top five teams going for the championship. The two division winners, along with the second place team with the next best record are given the top three seeds. The next two teams in terms of record are given the lower seeds.

The fourth and fifth seeds meet each other in the first round of the NBL Canada Playoffs. The winner of this best-of-three series goes on to meet the first seed in a best-of-five semi-finals series. Second and third seeds meet in the other semi-finals series. The winner of the two semi-finals series will meet in a final best-of-five series, known as the NBL Finals.

Wild card
4	Saint John	1
5	Moncton	2

Semifinals
1	London	3
5	Moncton	1
2	Summerside	3
3	Windsor	2

Finals
1	London	3
2	Summerside	1

=== Wild card series ===
(4) Saint John Mill Rats vs. (5) Moncton Miracles

March 19
7:00 pm

Report 1 Report 2

Moncton Miracles 98, Saint John Mill Rats 90
Scoring by quarter: 29–19, 17–24, 30–17, 30–23
Pts: Devin Sweetney 32; Rebs: Isaac Butts 15; Asts: Isaac Butts, Devin Sweetney, Darrell Wonge 3 each	Pts: Kenny Jones 21; Rebs: Kenny Jones 13; Asts: Jerice Crouch 5

Moncton Coliseum, Moncton, New Brunswick
Attendance: 2,268

March 22
7:00 pm

Report 1 Report 2

Saint John Mill Rats 126, Moncton Miracles 99
Scoring by quarter: 34–18, 25–31, 34–28, 33–22
Pts: Melvin Council 37; Rebs: Kenny Jones 13; Asts: Jerice Crouch 7	Pts: Darrell Wonge 22; Rebs: Isaac Butts, Sylvania Watkins 10 each Asts: Oliver McNally 9

Harbour Station, Saint John, New Brunswick
Attendance: 2,000

March 23
7:00 pm

Report 1 Report 2

Saint John Mill Rats 103, Moncton Miracles 111
Scoring by quarter: 21–38, 19–23, 24–25, 39–25
Pts: Jerice Crouch 34; Rebs: Kenny Jones 9 Asts: Melvin Council 9	Pts: Devin Sweetney 27; Rebs: Isaac Butts 17; Asts: Sylvania Watkins 8

Harbour Station, Saint John, New Brunswick
Attendance: 1,677

=== Semifinals ===
(1) London Lightning vs. (5) Moncton Miracles

March 25
7:00 pm

Report 1 Report 2

London Lightning 106, Moncton Miracles 80
Scoring by quarter: 18–17, 23–27, 33–17, 32–19
Pts: Elvin Mims 26; Rebs: Tim Ellis 10; Asts: Tim Ellis 6	Pts: Isaac Butts 27; Rebs: Isaac Butts 16; Asts: Herman Favors, Oliver McNally 4 each

Budweiser Gardens, London, Ontario
Attendance: 2,685

March 27
7:00 pm

Report 1 Report 2

London Lightning 89, Moncton Miracles 78
Scoring by quarter: 17–19, 20–15, 20–25, 32–19
Pts: Rodney Buford 19; Rebs: Elvin Mims 12; Asts: DeAnthony Bowden 8	Pts: Herman Favors 26; Rebs: Isaac Butts 14; Asts: Kamar Burke 3

Budweiser Gardens, London, Ontario
Attendance: 3,296

March 29
7:00 pm

Report 1 Report 2

Moncton Miracles 114, London Lightning 103
Scoring by quarter: 31–16, 20–22, 31–36, 32–29
Pts: Herman Favors 32; Rebs: Isaac Butts 9 Asts: Devin Sweetney 6	Pts: Tim Ellis 21; Rebs: Tim Ellis 9 Asts: DeAnthony Bowden, Adrian Moss 5

Moncton Coliseum, Moncton, New Brunswick
Attendance: 2,980

March 30
7:00 pm

Report 1 Report 2

Moncton Miracles 98, London Lightning 104
Scoring by quarter: 18–23, 21–30, 30–26, 29–25
Pts: Isaac Butts 25; Rebs: Isaac Butts 20; Asts: Herman Favors 8	Pts: DeAnthony Bowden 28; Rebs: Rodney Buford 10; Asts: Adrian Moss 7

Moncton Coliseum, Moncton, New Brunswick
Attendance: 1,981

(2) Summerside Storm vs. (3) Windsor Express

March 24
2:00 pm

Report 1 Report 2

Summerside Storm 112, Windsor Express 114
Scoring by quarter: 44–21, 26–26, 20–34, 22–33
Pts: Omari Johnson 19; Rebs: Antoine Tisby 13; Asts: Josiah Turner 10	Pts: Darren Duncan 33; Rebs: Greg Surmacz 15; Asts: Darren Duncan 13

Consolidated Credit Union Place, Summerside, Prince Edward Island
Attendance: 1,530

March 26
7:00 pm

Report 1 Report 2

Summerside Storm 114, Windsor Express 98
Scoring by quarter: 30–21, 26–23, 19–30, 39–24
Pts: Brandon Robinson 22; Rebs: Omari Johnson, Brandon Robinson 10 each Asts: Brandon Robinson, Al Stewart 9 each	Pts: Greg Surmacz 21; Rebs: Kevin Loiselle 12; Asts: Darren Duncan 12

Consolidated Credit Union Place, Summerside, Prince Edward Island
Attendance: 1,239

March 28
7:00 pm

Report 1 Report 2

Windsor Express 84, Summerside Storm 112
Scoring by quarter: 18–27, 18–36, 25–26, 23–23
Pts: Darren Duncan 14; Rebs: Greg Surmacz 12; Asts: Darren Duncan 11	Pts: Antoine Tisby 23; Rebs: Al Stewart 11; Asts: Al Stewart 9

WFCU Centre, Windsor, Ontario
Attendance: 1,028

March 30
7:00 pm

Report

Windsor Express 124, Summerside Storm 122 2OT (OT)
Scoring by quarter: 26–24, 22–25, 27–21, 27–28, Overtime: 12–12, 12–10
Pts: Darren Duncan 27; Rebs: Darren Duncan 16; Asts: Darren Duncan 13	Pts: Antoine Tisby 28; Rebs: Omari Johnson 14; Asts: Greg Plummer 10

WFCU Centre, Windsor, Ontario
Attendance: 540

April 2
7:00 pm

Report 1 Report 2

Summerside Storm 109, Windsor Express 103
Scoring by quarter: 25–24, 31–24, 31–28, 22–27
Pts: Greg Plummer 30; Rebs: Greg Plummer 11; Asts: Royce Parran 11	Pts: Mike Helms 23; Rebs: Greg Surmacz 14; Asts: Darren Duncan 10

Consolidated Credit Union Place, Summerside, Prince Edward Island
Attendance: 2,073

=== Finals ===
April 6
7:00 pm

Box Score
Recap Archived 2013-10-28 at the Wayback Machine(subscription required)

London Lightning 105, Summerside Storm 100
Scoring by quarter: 30–23, 20–20, 28–24, 27–33
Pts: Marvin Phillips 25; Rebs: Tim Ellis, Marvin Phillips 12; Asts: DeAnthony Bowden 12	Pts: Antoine Tisby 28; Rebs: Omari Johnson 9 Asts: Al Stewart 5

Budweiser Gardens, London, Ontario
Attendance: 4,423

April 7
7:00 pm

Box Score
Recap Archived 2013-11-04 at the Wayback Machine(subscription required)

London Lightning 99, Summerside Storm 96
'Scoring by quarter: 19–19, 31–25, 21–28, 28–24
Pts: Adrian Moss 25; Rebs: Elvin Mims 10; Asts: DeAnthony Bowden 5	Pts: Josiah Turner 25; Rebs: Omari Johnson 14; Asts: Josiah Turner, Al Stewart 5

Budweiser Gardens, London, Ontario
Attendance: 3,406

April 10
7:00 pm

Box Score
Recap Archived 2013-10-07 at the Wayback Machine(subscription required)

Summerside Storm 111, London Lightning 99
Scoring by quarter: 25–19, 20–26, 40–28, 26–26
Pts: Omari Johnson 33; Rebs: Brandon Robinson 9 Asts: Josiah Turner 9	Pts: Tim Ellis 17; Rebs: Adrian Moss 6 Asts: DeAnthony Bowden 9

Consolidated Credit Union Place, Summerside, Prince Edward Island
Attendance: 2,582

April 12
7:00 pm

Box Score
Recap Archived 2013-10-07 at the Wayback Machine(subscription required)

Summerside Storm 80, London Lightning 87
Scoring by quarter: 22–8, 15–24, 17–18, 26–37
Pts: Brandon Robinson 24; Rebs: Gregory Plummer, Brandon Robinson 12; Asts: Royce Parran 8	Pts: Marvin Phillips 19; Rebs: Tim Ellis 13; Asts: Morgan Lewis 8

Consolidated Credit Union Place, Summerside, Prince Edward Island
Attendance: 3,019

== All-Star Game ==
The 2013 NBL All-Star Game will take place the weekend of April 13–14, in Saint John, New Brunswick.

=== Roster ===
Atlantic Division All-Stars
Pos	Player	Team	No. of selections
Starters
G	Jerice Crouch	Saint John Mill Rats	1
G	Joey Haywood	Halifax Rainmen	2
G/F	Brandon Robinson	Summerside Storm	2
G/F	Devin Sweetney	Moncton Miracles	1
C	Isaac Butts	Moncton Miracles	1
Reserves
G	Al Stewart	Summerside Storm	1
G/F	Kamar Burke	Moncton Miracles	1
F	Chris Cayole	Summerside Storm	1
F	Omari Johnson	Summerside Storm	2
F	Steve Deluca	Saint John Mill Rats	1
G/F	Kenny Jones^{OSC}	Saint John Mill Rats	1
G	Antonio Ballard^{INJ}	Summerside Storm	1
Head coach: Joe Salerno (Summerside Storm)

Central Division All-Stars
Pos	Player	Team	No. of selections
Starters
G	Darren Duncan	Windsor Express	2
G	Nick Okorie	Oshawa Power	1
F	Tim Ellis	London Lightning	1
F	Elvin Mims	London Lightning	1
F/C	Marvin Philips	London Lightning	1
Reserves
G	Antwi Atuahene	London Lightning	1
G	Papa Oppong	Oshawa Power	1
F	J.R. Harrison	Montreal Jazz	1
F	Greg Surmacz	Windsor Express	1
F	Chris Common	Windsor Express	1
Head coach: Micheal Ray Richardson (London Lightning)

^INJ Will not participate due to injury.
^OSC Will not participate due to overseas commitment.

=== Game ===
April 14, 2013

Box score

Atlantic Division 145, Central Division 150
Scoring by quarter: 35–34, 34–41, 35–45, 41–30
Pts: Ballard 28; Rebs: Ballard 11; Asts: Crouch 15	Pts: Phillips 37; Rebs: Phillips 14; Asts: Atuahene 15

Harbour Station, Saint John, New Brunswick
Attendance: 2,000
