= Isaac Butts =

American basketball player (born 1989)

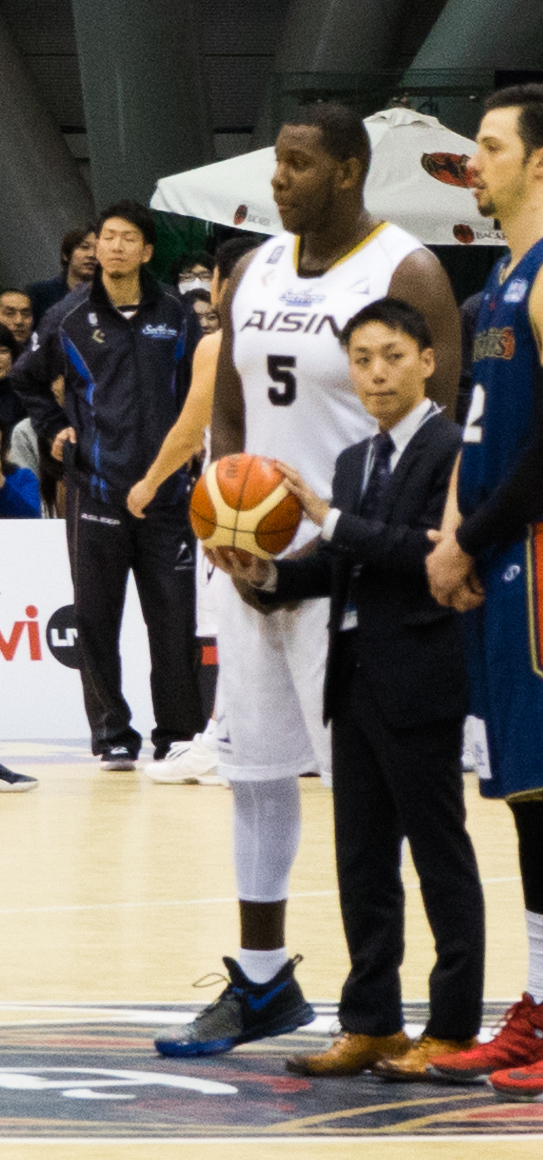

No. 5 – Kobe Storks
- Position: Center
- League: B.League

Personal information
- Born: May 28, 1989 (age 37)
- Listed height: 6 ft 10 in (2.08 m)
- Listed weight: 295 lb (134 kg)

Career information
- High school: Georgia Military College Prep (Milledgeville, Georgia)
- College: Appalachian State (2007–2012)
- NBA draft: 2012: undrafted
- Playing career: 2012–present

Career history
- 2012–2013: Moncton Miracles
- 2013–2014: SC Rasta Vechta
- 2014–2015: Hyogo Storks
- 2015–2019: Aisin Seahorses
- 2020: Toyama Grouses
- 2020–2024: Koshigaya Alphas
- 2024: Fighting Eagles Nagoya
- 2025: Nagoya Diamond Dolphins
- 2025–present: Kobe Storks

Career highlights
- NBL Canada Rookie of the Year (2012); NBL Canada All-Star (2012); First-team All-NBL Canada (2012); NBL Canada All-Defensive Team (2012)

Isaac Butts IV (born May 28, 1989) is an American professional basketball player for the Kobe Storks of the B.League. Butts played high school basketball at Georgia Military College Prep School until 2007. He averaged 26 points per game and 17 rebounds per game during his senior year. Upon high school graduation, he received a scholarship to attend Appalachian State University. Once he completed his collegiate career at Appalachian State, he was invited to participate in the Orlando Magic Summer League.

== Professional career ==
On August 16, 2024, Butts signed with the Fighting Eagles Nagoya of the B.League. On December 17, his contract was terminated. On January 10, 2025, he signed a short-term contract with the Nagoya Diamond Dolphins. On February 18, he signed with the Kobe Storks.

== Career statistics ==
Legend
GP	Games played	GS	Games started	MPG	Minutes per game
FG%	Field goal percentage	3P%	3-point field goal percentage	FT%	Free throw percentage
RPG	Rebounds per game	APG	Assists per game	SPG	Steals per game
BPG	Blocks per game	PPG	Points per game	**Bold**	Career high

Year	Team	GP	GS	MPG	FG%	3P%	FT%	RPG	APG	SPG	BPG	PPG
2012–13	Moncton	36	20	29.1	.603	.000	.549	11.1	1.44	0.36	1.61	14.97
2013–14	SC Rasta Vechta	32	8	14.2	.625	.000	.623	4.31	0.34	0.12	0.62	5.5
2014–15	Nishinomyia	52	50	35.4	.649	.000	.578	15.2	2.73	0.58	1.27	17.06
2015–16	Mikawa	62	44	25.2	.679	.000	.549	10.55	0.77	0.35	1.06	9.89
2016–17	Mikawa	64	53	26.8	.658	.000	.588	11.53	0.95	0.27	0.67	9.22
2017–18	Mikawa	64	52	27.5	.655	.000	.665	10.53	1.38	0.55	0.73	9.86
2018–19	Mikawa	45	39	31.9	.592	.000	.626	12.11	2.13	0.69	0.56	10.09
2019–20	Toyama	12	12	38.1	.712	.000	.673	13.58	1.92	0.5	1.08	16.25
