= Al Stewart (basketball) =

American basketball player (born 1983)

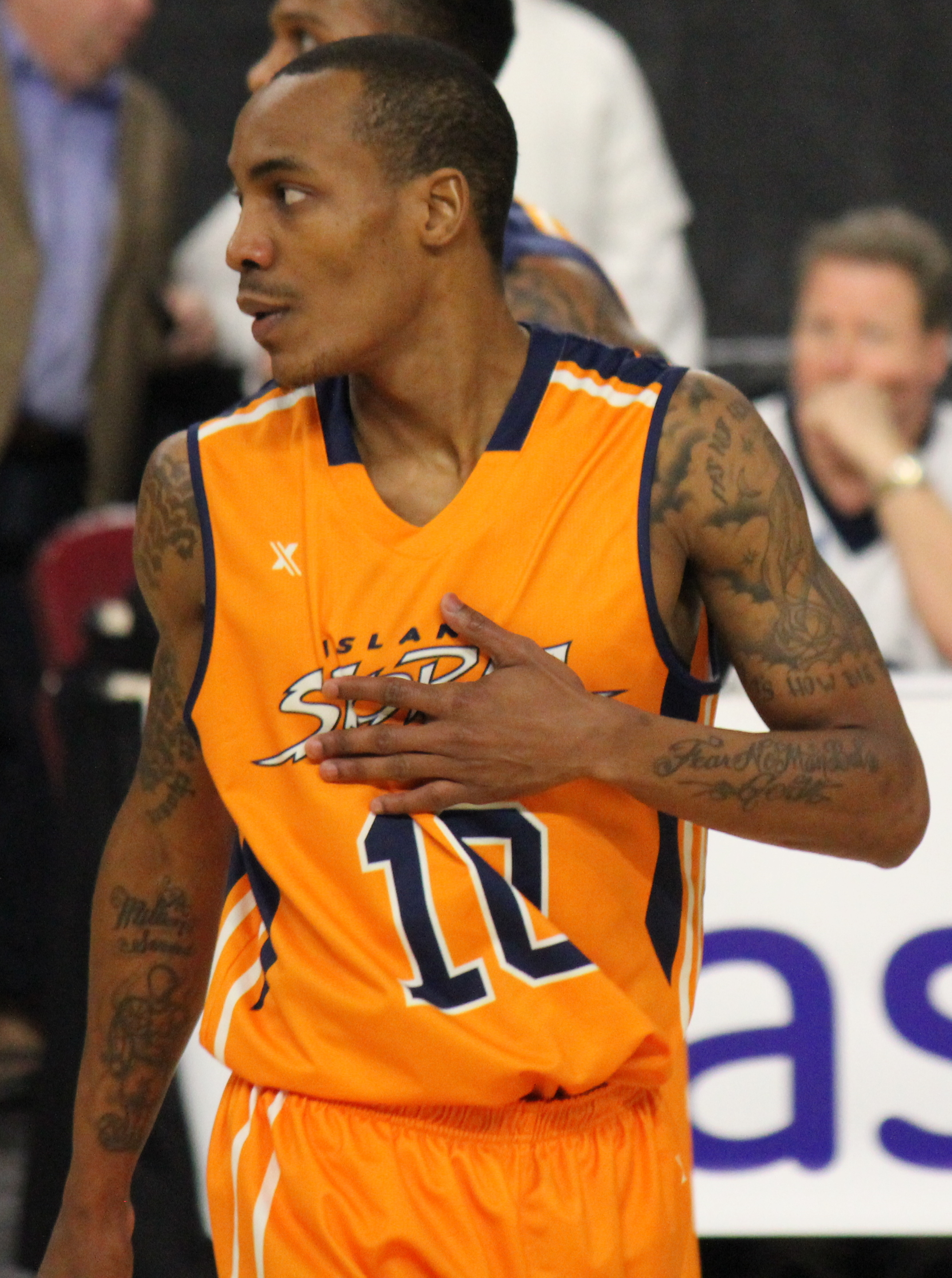
- Stewart in 2017

No. 10 – Moncton Magic
- Position: Point guard
- League: NBL Canada

Personal information
- Born: September 5, 1983 (age 43) Chicago, Illinois
- Listed height: 5 ft 10 in (1.78 m)
- Listed weight: 180 lb (82 kg)

Career information
- High school: Manley Academy (Chicago, Illinois)
- College: Southwestern CC (2002–2003); Des Moines CC (2004–2005); Drake (2005–2007)
- NBA draft: 2007: undrafted
- Playing career: 2007–present

Career history
- 2007: Corning Bulldogs
- 2008: Manchester Millrats
- 2008: Decatur Court Kings
- 2009–2010: Manchester Millrats
- 2010: Vermont Frost Heaves
- 2011–2014: Summerside / Island Storm
- 2014–2015: London Lightning
- 2015–2016: Saint John Mill Rats
- 2016–2017: Island Storm
- 2017–: Moncton Magic

Career highlights
- NBL Canada All-Star (2013); All-NBL Canada Third Team (2013); 2× NBL Canada Defensive POY (2012, 2013); 2× NBL Canada All-Defensive Team (2012, 2013); PBL co-Defensive Player of the Year (2009)

Al Stewart (born September 5, 1983) is an American professional basketball player for the Moncton Magic of the National Basketball League of Canada (NBL).

== High school career ==
Stewart attended Manley Academy in Chicago, Illinois, where he played basketball under head coach Bo Delaney. He was a teammate of future NBA player Luther Head. His playing time increased after Head left the team. Stewart was known for being a strong ball-handler and became Manley's top point guard heading into his senior season. As a senior, he averaged 16.2 points, 12.1 assists and 4.9 rebounds, winning all-sectional honors. Stewart also earned All-Chicago Public School accolades two times.

== College career ==
Stewart played one season of college basketball at Southwestern Community College in Creston, Iowa. After his freshman season in the NJCAA, he averaged 14.3 points, 6.1 assists, 4.1 rebounds and 3.3 steals, and he shot 60% on field goals. Stewart was named first team All-ICCAC at the end of the season.

== Personal life ==
Stewart was born on September 5, 1983, in Chicago, Illinois to mother Cassandra Stewart. He has three brothers in Anthony, Darnell, Amir, and Jamil, and three sisters in Gabrielle Jayla, and Jessica. In early 2013, Stewart had a hiatus from professional basketball, leaving the Island Storm, to pursue a career as a teacher in the Chicago school system. He taught pre-kindergarten at Sherman Elementary School.
