= Walter Pitchford =

American basketball player (born 1992)

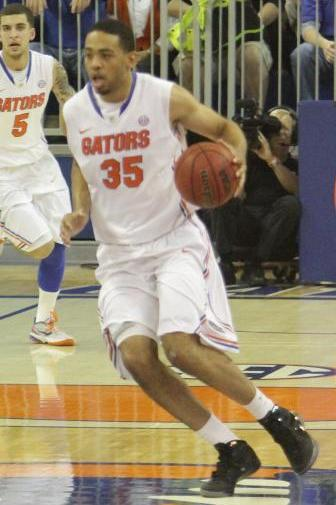

Personal information
- Born: April 24, 1992 (age 34) Chicago, Illinois
- Listed height: 6 ft 11 in (2.11 m)
- Listed weight: 237 lb (108 kg)

Career information
- High school: Summit Christian (East Lansing, Michigan)
- College: Florida (2011–2012); Nebraska (2013–2015)
- NBA draft: 2016: undrafted
- Playing career: 2015–2017
- Position: Power forward

Career history
- 2015: Raptors 905
- 2016–2017: BC Olimpi Tbilisi
- 2018: Sudbury Five
- 2018–2019: Saint John Riptide

Walter Pitchford V (born April 24, 1992) is an American basketball player. He played college basketball for Florida and Nebraska before joining Raptors 905 of the NBA Development League in 2015.

== College career ==
Pitchford initially played college basketball for the Florida Gators, but transferred to Nebraska in 2012. As a junior playing for the Cornhuskers in 2014–15, he averaged 7.2 points and 4.6 rebounds in 30 games.

== Professional career ==
On April 2, 2015, Pitchford declared for the 2015 NBA draft, forgoing his final year of college eligibility. However, on June 15, he withdrew his name from the draft, deciding instead to play overseas. He did not manage to secure an overseas contract, and instead tried out for the newly established NBA Development League franchise, Raptors 905. He was successful in earning a training camp roster spot, joining the squad in early November. Pitchford went on to make the final opening night roster for the start of the 2015–16 season, but after appearing in just five games over the first month and a half of action, Pitchford announced his retirement from professional basketball on December 26. Walter then returned to action and began training to become an NBA prospect once again.

Pitchford signed with BC Olimpi Tbilisi of the Georgian Superliga in 2016. He averaged 8.8 points and 5.2 rebounds per game in the Georgian league. He initially signed with the Moncton Magic of NBL Canada in 2018, but was traded to the Sudbury Five in October 2018. In December, he was acquired by the Saint John Riptide.
