= Sylvania Watkins =

American basketball player (born 1985)

No. 12 – Moncton Tri City Tide
- Position: Power forward / center
- League: The Basketball League of CanadaTBL

Personal information
- Born: February 18, 1985 (age 41) Atlanta, Georgia
- Listed height: 6 ft 9 in (2.06 m)
- Listed weight: 220 lb (100 kg)

Career information
- High school: South Atlanta (Atlanta, Georgia)
- College: Northwest Florida State (2004–2005); Western Kentucky (2005–2006); Crichton (2006–2008)
- NBA draft: 2008: undrafted
- Playing career: 2008–present

Career history
- 2010–2011: Georgia Gwizzlies (ABA)
- 2011: Atlanta Experience (ABA)
- 2011–2014: Moncton Miracles (Canada)
- 2014–2015: GIE Maile Matrix (UBA)
- 2015–2015: Moncton Miracles (Canada)

Career highlights
- 2× NBLC All-Defence Second Team (2012, 2013); NBL Canada All-Star (2012); First-team All-TSAC (2007)

Sylvania "Sly" Watkins (born February 18, 1985) is an American professional basketball player who currently plays for the Moncton Tri City Tide of the National Basketball League of Canada (NBL). He played college basketball at Okaloosa–Walton Community College and then Crichton College. Watkins also competed at the high school level with South Atlanta High School in his hometown, Atlanta, Georgia. As a professional, he has spent much of his years with the Moncton Miracles, seeing success primarily on the defensive end and has rejoined the new Moncton team, Tri City Tide in 2024.

== High school career ==
Watkins attended South Atlanta High School in Atlanta, Georgia and played varsity basketball for four years. In his junior year, he led his team to a 27–3 record and earned All-State honorable mention, first-team all-region, and first-team all-city honors. As a senior, Watkins averaged 12.5 points, 13.0 rebounds and 4.5 blocks and earned the same honors as he did the previous year. South Atlanta ended the season with a 30–2 mark and a berth at the 4A state championship game.

== Collegiate career ==
As a freshman, Watkins played college basketball at Okaloosa–Walton Community College in Niceville, Florida, averaging 8.2 points and 7.2 rebounds per game. The Raiders finished their season with a 21–9 record, second place in the Panhandle Conference, and berths to the state and NJCAA tournaments.

In November 2004, Watkins signed a National Letter of Intent (NLI) to play with the NCAA Division I program at Western Kentucky for the following season. Hilltoppers head coach Darrin Horn praised him for his style of play and expected him to become a significant part of the team's front line. However, Watkins later decided to not enroll at WKU for personal reasons.

Watkins competed with Crichton College in Memphis, Tennessee for the 2006–07 season. In his debut, he posted a double-double of 19 points and 10 rebounds against Philander Smith College. On November 21, 2006, he was named TranSouth Athletic Conference Player of the Week in men's basketball after leading Crichton to two wins to start off the season. He was averaging 23.0 points, 7.5 rebounds, 2.0 assists, 2.5 blocks, and 1.5 steals that week. At the end of the season, Watkins led the Comets to an Elite Eight appearance at the NAIA tournament. His team also won the TranSouth tournament and Watkins was named first-team all-conference.

== Professional career ==
In 2009, Watkins took part in the Southeastern Exposure Basketball League (SEBL) for Rome Servpro-1. He later joined the Georgia Gwizzlies of the American Basketball Association (ABA) for the 2010–11 season. Following his stint with the Gwizzlies, Watkins competed at the Kentuckiana Pro–Am summer league with Team Atlanta. In 2011, Watkins returned to the ABA and signed with the Atlanta Experience. However, he left the team in December, when he signed with the Moncton Miracles of the newly-created National Basketball League of Canada (NBL).
