= Darren Duncan =

American professional basketball player

Personal information
- Born: November 11, 1988 (age 38)
- Listed height: 6 ft 0 in (1.83 m)
- Listed weight: 170 lb (77 kg)

Career information
- High school: Christ the King (Queens, New York)
- College: Merrimack (2006–2010)
- NBA draft: 2010: undrafted
- Playing career: 2010–2018
- Position: Point guard

Career history
- 2010–2011: Raiffeisen Dornbirn Lions
- 2011: NH Ostrava
- 2011: Levharti Chomutov
- 2011: BK 04 AC LB SNV
- 2012: Saint John Mill Rats
- 2012: Halifax Rainmen
- 2012–2014: Windsor Express
- 2014–2015: Salon Vilpas
- 2015: Apollon Patras
- 2015–2016: KTP Basket Kotka
- 2016–2017: Windsor Express
- 2017–2018: KW Titans

Career highlights
- NBL Canada champion (2014); NBL Canada All-Star (2012, 2013); First-team All-NBL Canada (2013); Austrian Second League champion (2011); Austrian Second League Finals MVP (2011); First-team NCAA Division II All-American (2010); Merrimack Athletic Hall of Fame (2017)

Darren Duncan (born November 11, 1988) is an American former professional basketball player.

== Collegiate career ==
Duncan attended Merrimack College in North Andover, Massachusetts and graduated in 2010. He was a finalist for the Bob Cousy Award as a junior. Other finalists included Stephen Curry, Jeff Teague, and Ty Lawson.

== Professional career ==
In his rookie season, Duncan led Raiffesen Dornbirn Lions to the Austrian Division II Basketball League championship. Averaging 25.5 points in the semifinals, he was named Finals Most Valuable Player and most notably recorded a game-winning shot in the Final Four round.

Duncan was named a National Basketball League of Canada (NBL) All-Star in 2012 and 2013 while he was with the Halifax Rainmen and Windsor Express. He also earned All-NBL Canada honors and won the 2014 NBL Canada Finals in the latter season.

On August 7, 2015, Duncan signed a one-year deal with Apollon Patras of the Greek Basket League. He left Apollon after appearing in seven games. On December 2, 2015, he signed with KTP Basket Kotka for the rest of the season.

On November 21, 2016, Duncan re-signed with Windsor Express.
