= Kamar Burke =

Canadian basketball player

Personal information
- Born: August 25, 1986 (age 40)
- Listed height: 6 ft 5 in (1.96 m)
- Listed weight: 220 lb (100 kg)

Career information
- High school: North Albion (Toronto)
- College: Thompson Rivers (2006–2008); British Columbia (2009–2011)
- Playing career: 2012–present
- Position: Small forward

Career history
- 2012–2013: Moncton Miracles (Canada)

Career highlights
- NBL Canada All-Star (2013); Second-team All-NBL Canada (2013)

Kamar Burke (born August 25, 1986) is a Canadian retired professional basketball player and the founder and head trainer of Developing Individual Peak Performance Basketball (DiPP).

== College career ==
The small forward played college basketball at Thompson Rivers University and later, the University of British Columbia, who were among the most successful teams in the Canadian Interuniversity Sport (CIS). He was one of the top rebounders in the CIS while with the UBC Thunderbirds.

== Professional career ==
He played one season of professional basketball for the Moncton Miracles of the National Basketball League of Canada (NBL) and was named an All-Star in 2013. Burke later teamed up with former on-court rival, Azi Sadi, to create DiPP Basketball.
