= Omari Johnson =

Jamaican basketball player (born 1989)

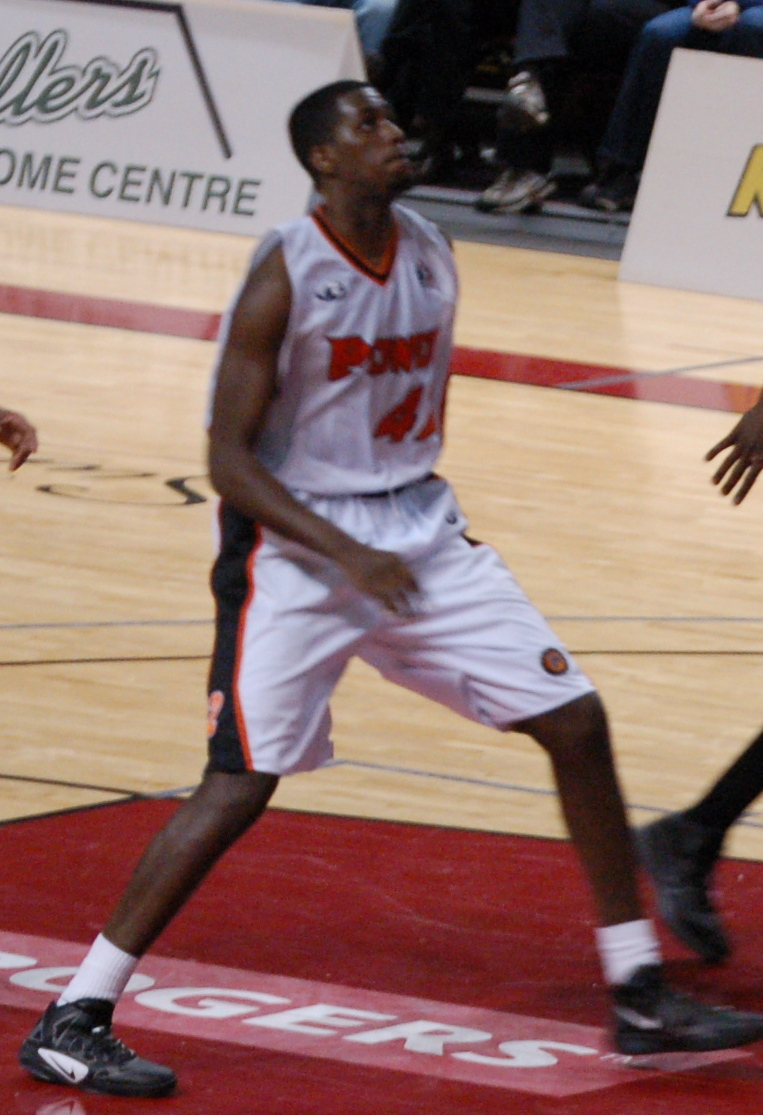
- Johnson playing for the Oshawa Power in 2012

Personal information
- Born: November 26, 1989 (age 36) Kingston, Jamaica
- Listed height: 6 ft 9 in (2.06 m)
- Listed weight: 220 lb (100 kg)

Career information
- High school: Dorsey (Los Angeles, California)
- College: Oregon State (2007–2011)
- NBA draft: 2011: undrafted
- Playing career: 2011–2019
- Position: Power forward

Career history
- 2011–2012: Oshawa Power
- 2012–2013: Summerside Storm
- 2013–2014: CB Valladolid
- 2014–2016: Maine Red Claws
- 2016–2017: Neptūnas Klaipėda
- 2017–2018: Memphis Hustle
- 2018: Memphis Grizzlies
- 2018–2019: Fort Wayne Mad Ants

Career highlights
- 2× NBL Canada All-Star (2012, 2013); Second-team All-NBL Canada (2012)
- Stats at NBA.com
- Stats at Basketball Reference

Omari Johnson (born November 26, 1989) is a Jamaican professional basketball player. Johnson played college basketball with the Oregon State Beavers and graduated from high school at Susan Miller Dorsey High School in He has played professional basketball in the NBA, the NBA G League, Canada and Spain.

== High school career ==
Johnson played high school basketball for Dorsey High School in Los Angeles. In his junior season, he came off the bench and averaged 11 points and 7 rebounds per game. As a senior, he averaged 18.3 points, 10.1 rebounds and 1.5 blocks per game, being named to the All-CIF LA first team. Led by Johnson, Dorsey reached the sectional semifinals of CIF LA.

== College career ==
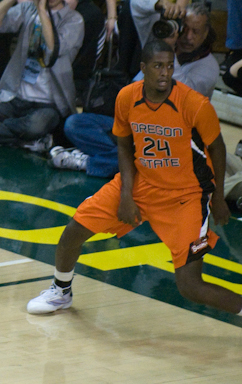
Omari Johnson playing for Oregon State

After considering offers from Wyoming, South Florida, and Long Beach State, Johnson verbally committed to Oregon State in Corvallis. He said his reason for choosing to go to Oregon State University was that Corvallis is a college town and he felt needed by his prospective teammates. Additionally he liked having the opportunity to compete against top talent in the Pac-10. He achieved a career-high performance in scoring with 19 points as a freshman, as the Beavers lost 76–63 to Arizona. He tied that feature as a sophomore, also recording his first double-double, with 10 rebounds, helping his team get past Nebraska with a narrow 64–63 win.

Although 6-foot-7 when he started college, Johnson grew more than two inches before his junior season to reach a height of 6-foot-9. Coach Craig Robinson expected Johnson to become Oregon State's focal point in offense, but was mainly used as a reserve player due to his sub-par effort on the defensive end. Johnson had a breakout game in the 2010 Civil War rivalry game versus the Oregon Ducks, scoring a season-high 18 points on 4-of-6 three-pointers.

In his senior season Johnson achieved a career-high with 13 rebounds, also adding 15 points for his second career double-double, as Oregon State lost 83–80 to Seattle. A few days later, he had a career-high 6 steals and added 13 points, as Oregon State lost 66–60 to Texas Southern. Prior to the game against local rivals Oregon, Johnson said that his opponents were "a feisty little bunch of dudes... They bump us more, you get elbows in the back a little more than other games, it's just physically and verbally more intense." He added, "I wouldn't call 'em dirty". In four seasons with the Beavers, Johnson appeared in 120 games, starting 67 of them and averaged 6.4 points and 4.0 rebounds per game.

=== College statistics ===
Legend
| GP | Games played | GS | Games started | MPG | Minutes per game |
| FG% | Field goal percentage | 3P% | 3-point field goal percentage | FT% | Free throw percentage |
| RPG | Rebounds per game | APG | Assists per game | SPG | Steals per game |
| BPG | Blocks per game | PPG | Points per game | **Bold** | Career high |

| Year | Team | GP | GS | MPG | FG% | 3P% | FT% | RPG | APG | SPG | BPG | PPG |
|---|---|---|---|---|---|---|---|---|---|---|---|---|
| 2007–08 | Oregon State | 23 | 13 | 21.5 | .392 | .309 | .667 | 4.3 | .4 | .4 | **.5** | **7.3** |
| 2008–09 | Oregon State | **34** | 14 | 19.9 | .432 | **.344** | .577 | 3.2 | .8 | .5 | .4 | 6.6 |
| 2009–10 | Oregon State | 32 | 10 | 15.5 | .370 | .267 | **.677** | 2.6 | .6 | .5 | .2 | 4.7 |
| 2010–11 | Oregon State | 31 | **27** | **26.7** | **.459** | .239 | .519 | **6.2** | **1.0** | **.8** | .3 | 7.2 |
| Career | | 120 | 64 | 20.8 | .418 | .293 | .600 | 4.0 | .7 | .6 | .3 | 6.4 |

== Professional career ==
=== Oshawa Power (2011–2012) ===
After graduating from college, Johnson was selected by the Oshawa Power to play in their 2011 pre-season squad. He played in Oshawa's inaugural game in the NBL Canada, posting 8 points and 3 rebounds. Against the Halifax Rainmen he finished with career-highs in both scoring and rebounding with 37 and 16 respectively; his scoring performance being a then NBL Canada record. In the wake of the loss Johnson commented: "We weren't guarding at all and had too many turnovers". In the D-League 2012 draft, Johnson was selected 74th overall by the Canton Charge, only to be waived a few days later.

=== Summerside Storm (2012–2013) ===
After being named in the All-NBL Canada second-team and an All-Star in the 2011–12 season, Johnson signed with the Summerside Storm in December 2012. He posted a season-high 34 points, along with 13 rebounds, to help the Storm overcome his former team, the Oshawa Power. During two seasons in Canada, Johnson began 43 of his 57 regular-season games, averaging 18.5 points, 8.5 rebounds, 2.6 assists, 1.4 blocks and 1.4 steals per game.

=== CB Valladolid (2013–2014) ===
In September 2013, Johnson signed with CB Valladolid, an ACB team. In Spain, Johnson had his best scoring performance against FC Barcelona Baloncesto, scoring a game-high 20 points. Johnson started 24 of the season's 34 games, averaging 11.6 points and 6 rebounds per game in 26 minutes playing time.

=== Maine Red Claws (2014–2016) ===
Johnson was selected 39th overall in the 2014 NBA D-League Draft by the Maine Red Claws. In February 2015, playing against the Westchester Knicks, he had a season-high performance of 30 points, also having 15 rebounds. He tied his scoring season-high two weeks later, against the same opponent, grabbing 14 rebounds to achieve a double-double. On September 25, 2015, Johnson signed with the Portland Trail Blazers. However, on October 23, he was waived after appearing in four preseason games. On October 31, he was reacquired by the Red Claws.

=== Neptūnas Klaipėda (2016–2017) ===
On November 9, 2016, Johnson signed with Neptūnas Klaipėda of the Lithuanian League. On February 10, 2017, he parted ways with Neptūnas due to disciplinary issues.

=== Memphis Hustle (2017–2018) ===
On August 23, 2017, Johnson was selected by the Memphis Hustle in the NBA G League expansion draft.

=== Memphis Grizzlies (2018) ===
On April 6, 2018, the Memphis Grizzlies announced they had signed Johnson to multi-year contract. He would make his NBA debut before the end of the 2017–18 season. On June 24, 2018, he was released by the Memphis Grizzlies.

=== Fort Wayne Mad Ants (2018–2019) ===
On September 21, 2018, Johnson signed with the Indiana Pacers. He was waived on October 11, 2018, by Indiana. He played in 2018 and 2019 for the Fort Wayne Mad Ants (the G-League affiliate of the Indiana Pacers) who acquired his G-league rights in a trade with the Memphis Hustle(Memphis Grizzlies G-League team). He was added to the Fort Wayne Mad Ants training camp roster. On February 23, 2019, Johnson recorded a career-high 8 3-pointers as he recorded 28 points, 6 rebounds and 2 assists in a 99–100 losing effort to the Canton Charge.

== Career statistics ==
Legend
| GP | Games played | GS | Games started | MPG | Minutes per game |
| FG% | Field goal percentage | 3P% | 3-point field goal percentage | FT% | Free throw percentage |
| RPG | Rebounds per game | APG | Assists per game | SPG | Steals per game |
| BPG | Blocks per game | PPG | Points per game | **Bold** | Career high |

=== NBA ===
| Year | Team | GP | GS | MPG | FG% | 3P% | FT% | RPG | APG | SPG | BPG | PPG |
|---|---|---|---|---|---|---|---|---|---|---|---|---|
| 2017–18 | Memphis | 4 | 0 | 18.8 | .429 | .333 | — | 2.8 | 1.8 | .5 | .0 | 5.5 |
| Career | | 4 | 0 | 18.8 | .429 | .333 | — | 2.8 | 1.8 | .5 | .0 | 5.5 |

== Personal life ==
Omari Johnson is the son of Jennifer Gordon and Dave Johnson. He hails from Kingston, Jamaica. Both of his parents are former basketball players, his mother at Florida Tech in Melbourne, and his father at Shaw University in Raleigh, North Carolina. He has two brothers, Shakir and Kahlil.
