= Elvin Mims =

American professional basketball player (born 1979)

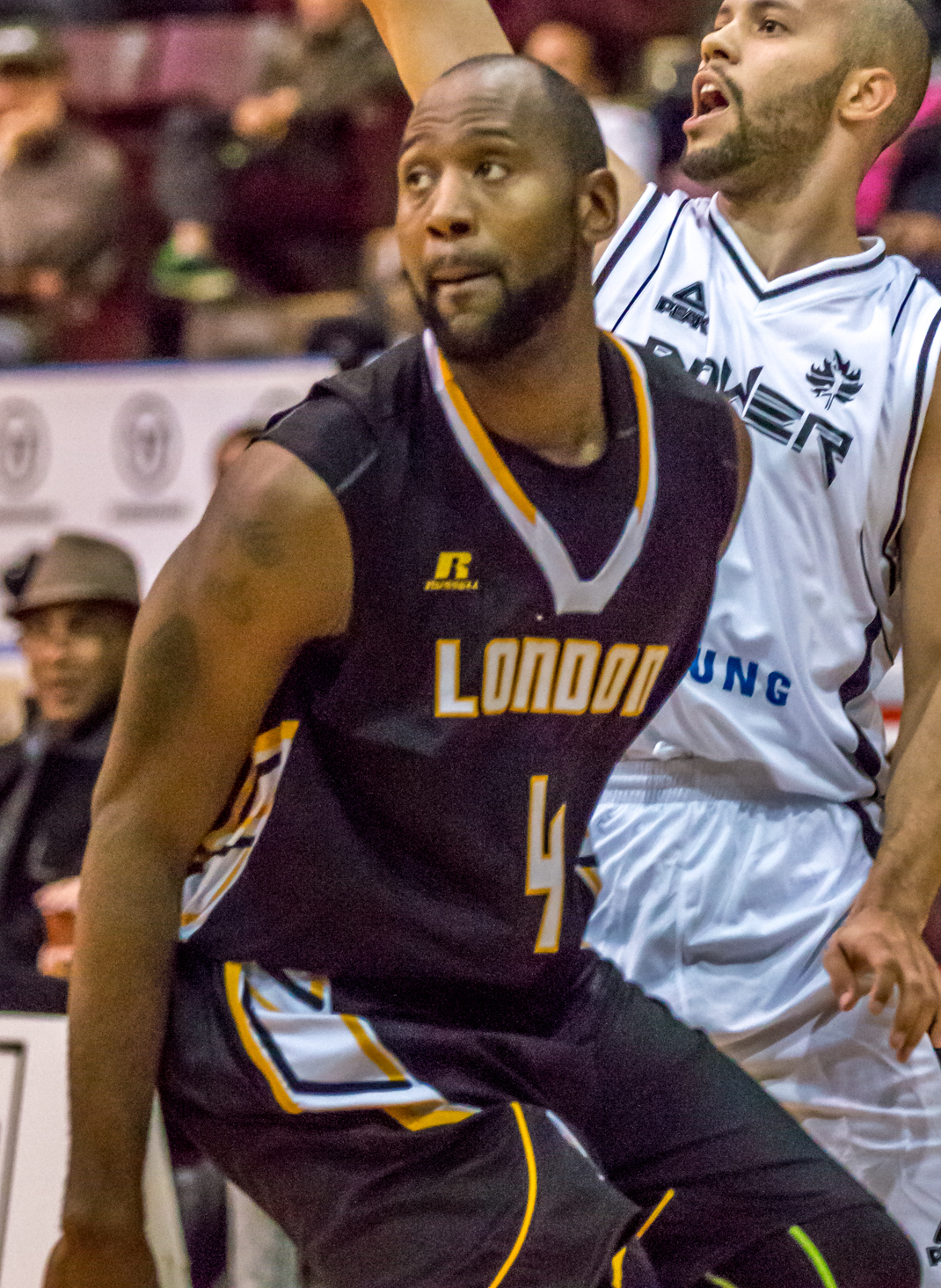
- Mims defends Tyrell Vernon in 2015

Free agent
- Position: Power forward

Personal information
- Born: December 23, 1979 (age 46) Chicago, Illinois
- Listed height: 6 ft 6 in (1.98 m)
- Listed weight: 205 lb (93 kg)

Career information
- High school: Northview (Century, Florida)
- College: Northwest Florida State (1998–2000); Southern Miss (2000–2002)
- NBA draft: 2002: undrafted
- Playing career: 2002–present

Career history
- 2004: KR
- 2004–2006: Yakima Sun Kings
- 2006–2007: Nebraska Cranes
- 2007–2008: Yakima Sun Kings
- 2008–2011: Lawton-Fort Sill Cavalry
- 2011–2012: Townsville Crocodiles
- 2012–2015: London Lightning

Career highlights
- NBL Canada All-Star (2014); First-team All-NBL Canada (2013); NBL Canada All-Defensive Team (2013); 3× CBA champion (2006, 2007, 2009); CBA blocks leader (2009)

Elvin Mims (born December 23, 1979) is an American professional basketball player who last played for the London Lightning of the NBL Canada. He has previously played in multiple leagues in the United States and in Iceland as well as Canada. Prior to going pro, from 1998 to 2002, Mims played college basketball for Northwest Florida State College and University of Southern Mississippi.

== College career ==
Mims started played college basketball for Northwest Florida State College in 1998, moving to University of Southern Mississippi in 2000 and remaining there for two seasons.

== Playing career ==
Mims signed with KR of the Úrvalsdeild karla in end of February 2004. He appeared in KR's last two game of the regular season, averaging 12.5 points and 5.0 rebounds. In the playoffs, he averaged 20.3 points and 8.7 rebounds in KR's first round loss to Grindavík.

Mims won Continental Basketball Association (CBA) championships with the Yakama Sun Kings in 2006 and 2007, and Lawton-Fort Sill Cavalry in 2009.
