= Royce Parran =

American basketball player

Free agent
- Position: Point guard

Personal information
- Born: August 4, 1985 (age 41) Chicago, Illinois
- Listed height: 5 ft 10 in (1.78 m)
- Listed weight: 165 lb (75 kg)

Career information
- High school: Lincoln Park (Chicago, Illinois)
- College: Chicago State (2003–2007)
- NBA draft: 2007: undrafted
- Playing career: 2007–present

Career history
- 2007–2008: Minot SkyRockets
- 2008–2009: Chicago Steam
- 2009–2011: Laval Kebs
- 2011–2013: Island Storm
- 2013: Danilovgrad
- 2013–2014: Kumanovo
- 2014–2015: Belfius Mons-Hainaut

Royce Stephon Parran (born August 4, 1985) is an American professional basketball player who last played for Belfius Mons-Hainaut of the Belgian Basketball League. He played college basketball for Chicago State University. He finished his collegiate career as Chicago State's all-time leading scorer in their NCAA Division I era, with 1,510 points.

== College statistics ==
Year	Team	GP	GS	MPG	FG%	3P%	FT%	RPG	APG	SPG	BPG	PPG
2003–04	Chicago State	31	8	23.3	.448	.429	.878	2.10	2.16	1.29	0.03	8.68
2004–05	Chicago State	28	26	27.1	.434	.293	.691	1.71	2.68	1.71	0.04	9.96
2005–06	Chicago State	30	29	19.3	.413	.399	.762	3.40	3.87	1.87	0.03	18.03
2006–07	Chicago State	29	24	34.1	.437	.350	.827	3.10	4.69	2.21	0.14	14.52
