= Scranton/Wilkes-Barre Steamers =

- Founded: 2011
- League: Premier Basketball League
- Team history: Scranton/Wilkes-Barre Steamers (2012–present)
- Based in: Scranton, Pennsylvania
- Arena: Union Center (Lackawanna College)
- Colors: Blue, silver, red, white
- Owner: Joseph R Runco and Dr. Stanley Blondek
- Head coach: Dennis Mishko
- Dancers: The Steam

The Scranton/Wilkes-Barre Steamers were a Premier Basketball League (PBL) team who played during the 2012 season. Based in Scranton, Pennsylvania, the Steamers played their home games at the Student Union Center on the campus of Lackawanna College. In their only season, the Steamers finished 2nd in their division with a 10–10 record, clinching a playoff berth. In the first round of the playoffs, the Steamers were matched up against the Central Illinois Drive of the Central Division. The Steamers were swept by the Drive, 2 games to 0 in the best of three series.
