= Devin Sweetney =

American basketball player (born 1987)

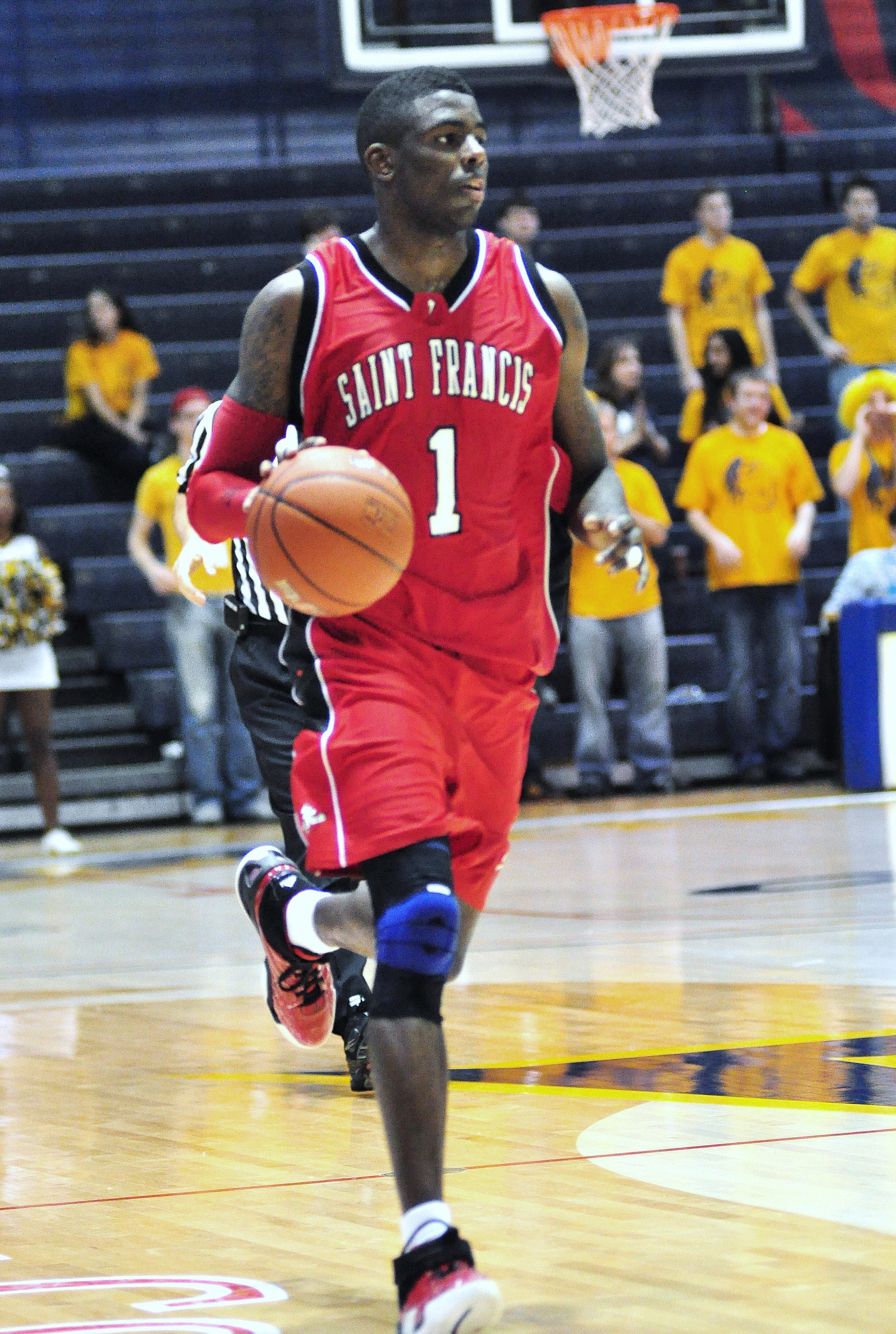
- Sweetney with Saint Francis in 2009

Zob Ahan Isfahan BC
- Position: Shooting guard / small forward
- League: Iranian Basketball Super League

Personal information
- Born: October 23, 1987 (age 38) Washington, D.C., U.S.
- Listed height: 6 ft 6 in (1.98 m)
- Listed weight: 200 lb (91 kg)

Career information
- High school: Riverdale Baptist (Upper Marlboro, Maryland)
- College: Saint Francis (PA) (2006–2010)
- NBA draft: 2010: undrafted
- Playing career: 2010–present

Career history
- 2011: Hamar
- 2011: Barons Kvartāls
- 2012–2013: Moncton Miracles
- 2013–2014: Lugano Tigers
- 2014: Union Neuchâtel Basket
- 2015: BBC Monthey
- 2015: Huracanes del Atlántico
- 2015–2016: Halcones Rojos Veracruz
- 2016: Proximus Spirou
- 2016–2017: betFirst Liège Basket
- 2017: Marinos de Anzoátegui
- 2017–2018: Aix Maurienne Savoie Basket
- 2018–2019: Capital City Go-Go
- 2019: Venados de Mazatlán
- 2019: Biguá
- 2020: Panionios
- 2020–2022: Zob Ahan Isfahan BC

Career highlights
- LNBA champion (2014); NBL Canada Most Valuable Player (2013); First-team All-NEC (2010); NEC All-Rookie Team (2007)
- Stats at Basketball Reference

Devin Antonio Sweetney (born October 23, 1987) is an American professional basketball player for Zob Ahan Isfahan BC of the Iranian Basketball Super League. He played college basketball for Saint Francis University and won the NBL Canada Most Valuable Player Award in 2013 after leading the National Basketball League of Canada (NBL) in scoring with the Moncton Miracles.

== Early life and career ==
Sweetney was born on October 23, 1987, in Washington, D.C. He attended Riverdale Baptist School in Upper Marlboro, Maryland. He was high school basketball teammates with Michael Beasley and Nolan Smith, who would both reach the National Basketball Association (NBA). Sweetney was a co-captain for Riverdale Baptist, and his team won the Falconers Summer Basketball League in July 2004. In early December 2004, he was sidelined from the Lone Star Invitational in San Antonio, Texas, but Riverdale Baptist was still able to win the event. On December 14, he scored 15 points as his team defeated Paul VI Catholic High School in a non-league contest. He added 12 points and 11 rebounds vs. Suitland High School on January 14, 2005.

== College career ==
Sweetney played four years of college basketball for the Saint Francis Red Flash. His arrival on the basketball team was highly anticipated, but he chose to redshirt the 2005–06 season. He averaged 16.9 points per game during his senior year in 2009–10. Sweetney left college with 1,529 points, seventh most in school history.

== Professional career ==
After spending the 2010 pre-season with the Tulsa 66ers, Sweetney joined Hamar, of the Icelandic Úrvalsdeild karla, in January 2011 where he went on to average 27.6 points in 7 games. He later joined Barons Kvartāls of Latvia in March for the rest of the season.

Sweetney sat out the 2011–12 season, only to return in 2012–13 and claim NBL Canada Most Valuable Player honors playing for the Moncton Miracles.

In July 2013, Sweetney signed with Lugano Tigers of the Swiss League and went on to help the team win the 2013–14 championship.

Sweetney returned to Switzerland to begin the 2014–15 season, playing four games for Union Neuchâtel Basket before leaving the club and joining BBC Monthey in January 2015. He played a further 16 games for Monthey before joining Huracanes del Atlántico of the Dominican Republic in June 2015.

On September 28, 2015, Sweetney signed with the Denver Nuggets. However, he was later waived by the Nuggets on October 24 after appearing in four preseason games. On November 29, he signed with Halcones Rojos Veracruz of the Mexican League. He averaged 17.6 points, 5.5 rebounds and 2.5 assists with Veracruz.

On February 25, 2016, Sweetney signed with Proximus Spirou of the Belgian League.

On June 27, 2016, Sweetney signed with betFirst Liège Basket, remaining in Belgium.

For the 2018–19 season, Sweetney signed with the Capital City Go-Go of the NBA G League. He was waived by the Go-Go on December 6, 2018.

Sweetney signed with Biguá of the Uruguayan league in 2019. He averaged 15.3 points and 3.5 rebounds per game. On January 3, 2020, Sweetney signed with Panionios of the Greek Basket League. In seven games, he averaged 8.3 points and 2.9 rebounds per game. On October 24, Sweetney signed with Zob Ahan Isfahan BC of the Iranian Basketball Super League.

== The Basketball Tournament (TBT) ==
In the summer of 2017, Sweetney competed in The Basketball Tournament on ESPN for the City of Gods. In their first-round matchup, Sweetney scored eight points in the City of Gods' 88–86 loss to Gael Nation, a team composed of Iona College basketball alum. Goss also played for the City of Gods in 2015. That summer, Sweetney averaged 12.3 points and 3.0 rebounds per game on 51% shooting over the course of six games. The City of Gods advanced to the 2015 TBT Championship Game where they fell 84–71 to Overseas Elite.

In TBT 2018, Sweetney suited up for HBC Sicklerville. He finished with 5 points and 2 rebounds in the team's first-round loss to the Talladega Knights.
