= Marvin Phillips =

American basketball player

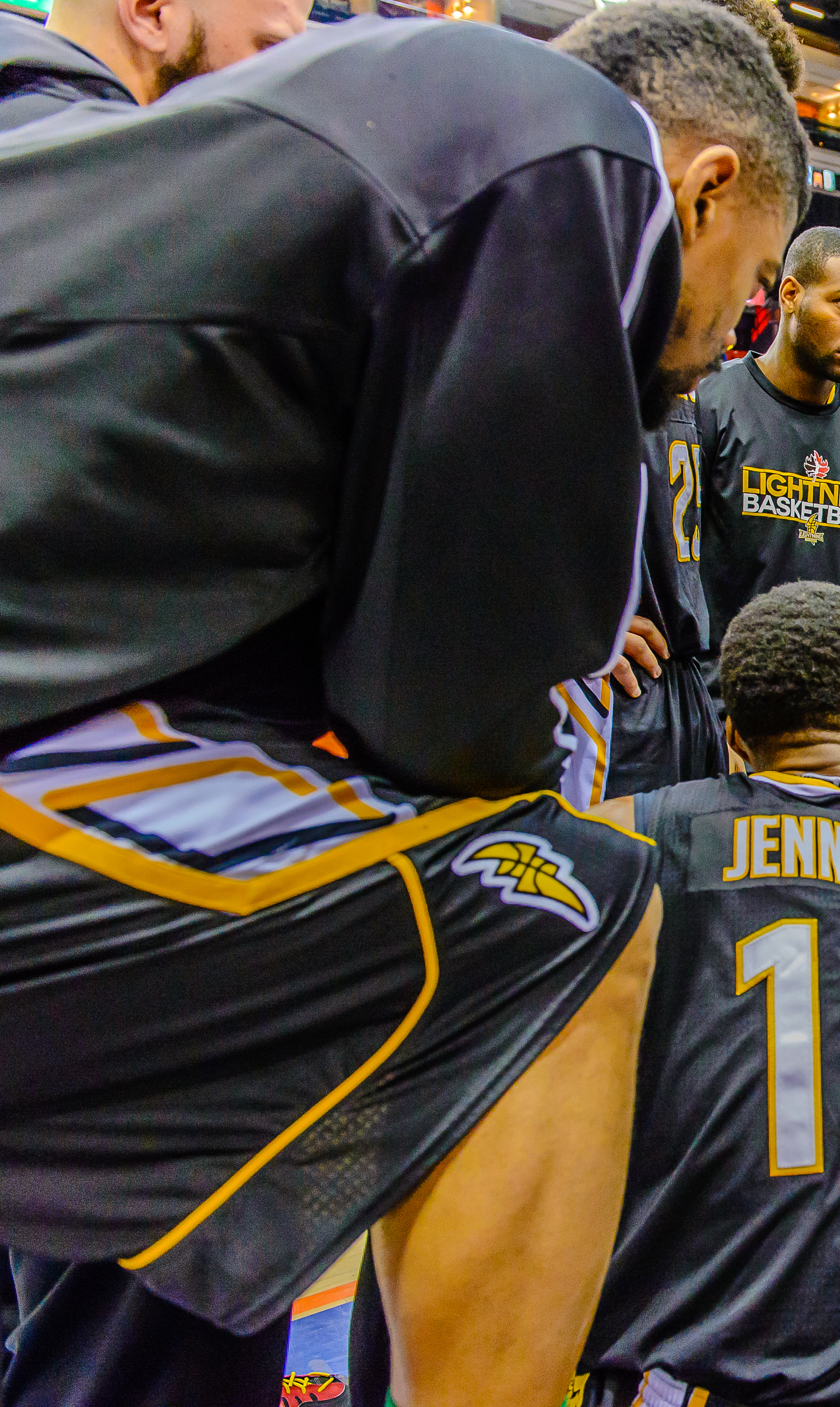
- Phillips with the London Lightning in 2015

KW Titans
- Position: Power forward
- League: NBL Canada

Personal information
- Born: December 28, 1983 (age 42) Jacksonville, North Carolina, U.S.
- Listed height: 6 ft 7 in (2.01 m)
- Listed weight: 235 lb (107 kg)

Career information
- College: Dodge City CC (2001–2002); Claflin (2002–2005)
- NBA draft: 2005: undrafted
- Playing career: 2005–present

Career history
- 2004–2005: Reigning Knights of Georgia
- 2005: South Carolina Heat
- 2006: Northern Pennsylvania Breakers
- 2006–2007: Pittsburgh Xplosion
- 2007: Albany Patroons
- 2007: Piratas Saludcoop Bogotá
- 2007–2008: Oklahoma City Cavalry
- 2008: Fuerza Regia
- 2008–2010: Iowa Energy
- 2010–2012: Fort Wayne Mad Ants
- 2012: Erie BayHawks
- 2012–2014: London Lightning
- 2014: SPO Rouen Basket
- 2014–2015: London Lightning
- 2015–2016: Étoile
- 2019–present: KW Titans

Career highlights
- NBL Canada champion (2013); NBL Canada Finals MVP (2013); NBL Canada Newcomer of the Year (2013); NBL Canada All-Star Game MVP (2013); NBL Canada All-Star (2013); CBA champion (2008); All-CBA Second Team (2008); CBA Defensive Player of the Year (2008); CBA All-Defensive Team (2008)

Marvin Phillips (born December 28, 1983) is an American professional basketball player who currently plays for the KW Titans of the National Basketball League of Canada. He most notably won the NBL Canada Finals Most Valuable Player Award in 2013, after leading the London Lightning to a National Basketball League of Canada championship that season. He was also named the league's All-Star Game MVP that same year, and Newcomer of the Year. Phillips has previously appeared in the NBA Development League, with teams like the Fort Wayne Mad Ants and Iowa Energy. He joined the KW Titans in 2019.

Phillips played for the Oklahoma City Cavalry of the Continental Basketball Association (CBA) during the 2007–08 season and won the CBA championship. He was named the CBA Defensive Player of the Year and earned All-CBA Second Team honors.
