= Quebec Kebs =

Former basketball team in Laval, Canada

- Founded: 2006
- League: ABA (2006–08); PBL (2008–11); NBL Canada (2011–12)
- Division: Central Division
- Team history: Quebec Kebs (ABA); 2006–2008; Quebec Kebs (PBL); 2008–2011; Quebec Kebs (NBLC); 2011–2012; Laval Kebs (NBLC); 2012
- Based in: Laval, Québec
- Arena: Colisee de Laval
- Colours: red, blue, white
- Owners: Group of owners
- Head coach: Rob Spon
- General manager: Vincent Bernier
- Championships: 0
- Mascot: Dunky

The Quebec Kebs (French: Kebs de Quebec) were a professional basketball team located in Laval, Quebec, formerly based in Quebec City, Quebec. The Kebs were part of the National Basketball League of Canada. They also played in the Atlantic Division of the Premier Basketball League. Prior to May 2008, they played in the American Basketball Association. Kebs is short for Kebekwa, a phonetic spelling of the word Québécois, or "Quebecers." Prior to folding, the team was briefly renamed the Laval Kebs.

== History ==
=== 2006–07 season ===
The team held a survey to name the team and 66% of the people preferred the name Kebekwa (a phonetic spelling of the word Québécois, "Quebecers").

The team earned a trip to the playoffs in their inaugural season and were defeated by the Strong Island Sound 108–97 in the first round.

=== 2007–08 season ===
Going with a fresh new image, the team changed its logo and color scheme. The team won its season opener 108–106 against the Manchester Millrats on October 12, 2007, at the Pavillon de la jeunesse. While the team finished with a 15–19 record, the Pavillon was the location of the 2008 ABA Championship Series, so the team gained an automatic Final VIII berth. Home-court advantage could not save them from first-round defeat, as the Kebs lost in the quarterfinals to the Texas Tycoons by a score of 122–120.

After the ABA playoffs, the team chose to join the PBL, announcing they would simply be the Quebec Kebs.

=== 2009–10 season ===
The Kebs changed their home arena from the Pavillon de la Jeunesse in Quebec City to PEPS at L'Université Laval in Sainte-Foy, Quebec.

=== 2010–11 season ===
Due to controversial officiating in the PBL playoffs, the Kebs, together with the Saint John Mill Rats and the Halifax Rainmen, left the PBL in April 2011.(in French)

=== 2011–12 season ===
On 12 May 2011, the Kebs were one of three teams announced as founding members of the National Basketball League of Canada.

The Kebs were one of seven teams competing in NBL Canada's inaugural season, joining past PBL rivals the Halifax Rainmen and Saint John Mill Rats along with new teams the London Lightning, Moncton Miracles, Oshawa Power, and Summerside Storm.

=== 2012 ===
Initially the team announced it would change arenas to Colisée de Laval and was rebranded as the Laval Kebs, however, the team folded before the start of the 2012–13 NBL Canada season when the ownership of the team was transferred to the league. The team was replaced in the NBL Canada by the Montreal Jazz.

== Final roster ==
| | # | Pos. | Player | Height |
|---|---|---|---|---|
| (United States) | 6 | G | Royce Parran | 5 ft 10 in (1.78 m) |
| (United States) | 7 | G | Shaun Fountain | 5 ft 11 in (1.80 m) |
| (Mali) | 10 | C | Soumaila Samake | 7 ft 1 in (2.16 m) |
| (United States) | 11 | G | Cedric Moodie | 6 ft 3 in (1.91 m) |
| (United States) | 12 | G | Carl Krauser | 6 ft 2 in (1.88 m) |
| (United States) | 16 | F | Taylor King | 6 ft 8 in (2.03 m) |
| (Canada) | 23 | F | Yannick Anzuluni | 6 ft 8 in (2.03 m) |
| (United States) | 24 | G | Ralphy Holmes | 6 ft 4 in (1.93 m) |
| (United States) | 34 | F | James "Boo" Jackson | 6 ft 8 in (2.03 m) |
| (Canada) | 42 | F | Ricky Volcy | 6 ft 7 in (2.01 m) |
| (United States) | 50 | C | Aaron Spears | 6 ft 10 in (2.08 m) |

=== Injured reserve ===
| | # | Pos. | Player | Height |
|---|---|---|---|---|
| (United States) | 5 | G | Tommy Mitchell | 6 ft 3 in (1.91 m) |
| (United States) | 21 | G | Jermaine Blackburn | 6 ft 7 in (2.01 m) |

== Season-by-season record ==
| Season | Coach | Regular season | | | | Postseason | | | |
| Season | Coach | Won | Lost | Win % | Finish | Won | Lost | Win % | Result |
|---|---|---|---|---|---|---|---|---|---|
| 2010–11 | Unknown | 14 | 6 | .700 | 2nd | 1 | 2 | .333 | Lost in semi final |
| 2011–12 | Rob Spon | 22 | 14 | .611 | 3rd | 1 | 2 | .333 | Lost in semi final |
| NBLC Totals | | 22 | 14 | .611 | - | 1 | 2 | .333 | - |

== See also ==
- Canada Basketball
