= Montreal Jazz =

Former basketball team in Montreal, Canada

- Founded: 2012
- League: National Basketball League of Canada
- Division: Atlantic Division
- Team history: Montreal Jazz; 2012-13
- Based in: Montreal, Quebec
- Arena: Centre Pierre Charbonneau
- Colours: Green, White
- Owner: National Basketball League of Canada
- Head coach: Alejandro Hasbani
- General manager: Pascal Jobin
- Championships: 0

The Montreal Jazz (French: Jazz de Montréal) were a Canadian professional basketball team based in Montreal, Quebec, Canada. The team played its only season in the National Basketball League of Canada in the 2012-2013 season, in place of the Laval Kebs. The Jazz played its home games at the Centre Pierre Charbonneau.

The Jazz did not play in the 2013-14 NBL Canada season after failing to secure a new ownership group.

== History ==
On October 26, 2012, NBL Canada announced that a Montreal expansion team would join the league in place of the recently folded Laval Kebs.

It was announced on November 1, 2012, that the team would be named the Montreal Jazz.

After finishing the 2012-13 NBL Canada season with a disappointing 2–38 record and without an owner, the NBL Canada Board of Governors decided to suspend the Jazz for the 2013-14 season.

== 2012-13 Roster ==
	#	Pos.	Player	Height
(Canada)	3	G	Marc-Daniel Renelique	189cm
(Canada)	4	C	Terance Licorish	208cm
(Canada)	5	F	Sheray Thomas	203cm
(Canada)	6	G	Manix Auriantal	188cm
(France)	7	F	Xavier Delarue	196cm
(Canada)	8	G	Dwayne Buckley	191cm
(Canada)	9	F	Louis-Patrick Levros	198cm
(Canada)	10	F	Juan Mendez	207cm
(Nigeria)	11	C	Sani Ibrahim	208cm
(Canada)	12	G	David Yul Michel	188cm
(Canada)	14	G	Damian Buckley	193cm

=== Injured reserve ===
#	Pos.	Player	Height

== Only season record ==
Season	Coach	Regular season				Postseason			
Season	Coach	Won	Lost	Win %	Finish	Won	Lost	Win %	Result
2012-13	Alejandro Hasbani	2	38	.050	8th	Out of playoffs			
Totals		2	38	.050	-	0	0	.000	0 Playoff Appearance
