= Oshawa Power =

Electricity distribution company in Oshawa, Ontario, Canada

- Company type: Municipal
- Industry: Electricity distribution
- Founded: 1887
- Headquarters: Oshawa, Ontario, Canada
- Area served: Oshawa, Ontario
- Products: MyOshawaPower (digital portal)
- Services: Electricity distribution
- Website: oshawapower.ca

Oshawa PUC Networks Inc., operating as Oshawa Power, is a licensed electricity distribution company based in Oshawa, Ontario, Canada. It is part of the Oshawa Power Group of Companies. Oshawa Power is wholly owned by the City of Oshawa and serves over 63,000 residential and commercial customers across approximately 145 square kilometres.

== History ==
Oshawa Power has been providing electricity to the Oshawa region for nearly 140 years. Electricity service in Oshawa began on September 12, 1887, when the Oshawa Electric Light Company introduced arc lighting to the city. The original company was operated in conjunction with the flour mill. Power was sourced from steam and augmented by a water power plant powered by a dam in the Oshawa Creek. In 1916, Oshawa Electric Light Co. was purchased by the Hydro Electric Power Commission of Ontario. In 1929, a bylaw was passed by the Oshawa City Council to purchase the electrical system for $310,000 and the gas distribution system for $210,000.

It has remained municipally owned and focused on local distribution. Its formal branding as Oshawa Power is part of the Oshawa Power Group of Companies, a diversified holding company comprising Oshawa Power; EnerFORGE, a province-wide independent power producer; and Durham Broadband, a regional high-speed internet service for the Durham region.

In 2022, Oshawa Power partnered with Peak Power, a Canadian climate tech company, to develop cost-effective means of reducing emissions and improving the reliability of the electricity system.

== Products and services ==
Oshawa Power distributes electricity to residential, commercial, and industrial customers in Oshawa. In 2020, the utility began offering a digital customer portal, MyOshawaPower, for billing and usage tracking.

The utility announced a partnership in 2024 with Lakefront Utilities to provide shared leadership and operational coordination in the towns of Cobourg and Colborne.

== Facilities ==
Since November 18, 1931, Oshawa Power has operated from its headquarters on 100 Simcoe Street South. The building was designated a Heritage Building by the City of Oshawa in 2020. The L-shaped building was designed by Oshawa-born architect C.C. Stenhouse in an Art Deco style and was the first modern building in Oshawa designed for civic service.

In 2025, Oshawa Power announced plans to relocate its operations to a new consolidated facility in Thornton Business Park. Construction is expected to begin in 2026, with completion anticipated in 2027. The complex will include over 30,000 square feet of office space, an equipment storage yard, a warehouse, and vehicle garage.

== Leadership ==
Oshawa Power is governed by a board appointed by the City of Oshawa. Executive leadership operates under the broader Oshawa Power and Utilities Corporation structure. The current CEO is Daniel Arbour.
