= Saint John Riptide =

Canadian professional basketball team based in Saint John, New Brunswick

- Division: Atlantic Division
- League: ABA 2007–2008; PBL 2009–2011; NBLC 2011–2019
- Founded: 2007
- History: Manchester Millrats (ABA); 2007–2008; Manchester Millrats (PBL); 2008–2010; Saint John Mill Rats (PBL); 2010–2011; Saint John Mill Rats (NBLC); 2011–2016; Saint John Riptide (NBLC); 2016–2019
- Arena: Harbour Station
- Location: Saint John, New Brunswick
- Team colours: Navy blue, gold, white
- President: Kelly Patterson
- Head coach: Nelson Terroba
- Website: www.sjriptide.ca

The Saint John Riptide were a Canadian professional basketball team based in Saint John, New Brunswick, that had home games at Harbour Station. They were a member of the National Basketball League of Canada (NBL Canada) in the Atlantic Division. The team was one of two professional basketball teams from the province of New Brunswick, the other being the Moncton Magic.

Established in 2007 as the Manchester Millrats (an expansion team based in Manchester, New Hampshire, which played in the American Basketball Association (ABA), a year later it moved to the Premier Basketball League (PBL). In 2010, it relocated to Saint John as the Saint John Mill Rats, and in 2016 it was renamed as the Riptide.

In 2019, the team was granted a one-season hiatus by the league, yet it has since been inactive.

== History ==
=== 2007–08 season ===
In their inaugural ABA season, the Manchester Millrats compiled a regular season record of 28–12, playing their home games at the Fieldhouse of Southern New Hampshire University (SNHU). They won their first 12 games and first four games against the reigning champion Vermont Frost Heaves. These were the only losses the Frost Heaves had in that season. The Millrats were one of eight teams to make the post season. They got to the semifinals but lost in overtime to the San Diego Wildcats. Larry Lessett was the head coach.

There were major logistical issues, as two of the four teams in the Millrats' division suspended operations. The ABA flew the Millrats to the Bahamas once and to Singapore twice to play against ABA teams with no local competition. Nevertheless, Millrats management organized additional games against local rivals and gave season ticket owners the full number of events they had been promised, although the final regular season game was played at a private center ten miles away.

Point guard Anthony Anderson got the ABA's Most Valuable Player award among other awards and recognition. Ian McCarthy was named the league's General Manager of the Year. Ismael Caro and Ife Anosike were separated from the team after a brawl that brought a game in Vermont to a premature end.

=== 2008–09 season ===
The logistical problems of the ABA led the Millrats to join the Premier Basketball League, with teams from Vermont, Quebec City, and Halifax. The 20-game PBL regular season began in January 2009. The Millrats and three other teams from the PBL's Atlantic Division added 6 exhibition games apiece in pursuit of the "Champlain Cup." The Millrats played three other exhibitions, including two against the Arecibo Captains of Puerto Rico.

Owner Jason Briggs bought a mansion in Manchester and remodeled it to contain sauna, steam rooms, a dinner table on stilts, and custom, seven-foot bunks. Players and coaches resided there and the garage became the business office. Sam Carey joined P.J. Young as Millrats who had played college basketball on the same home court for SNHU. Ife Anosike rejoined the Millrats, left at mid-season to pursue a nursing career, but returned for the playoffs.

The Millrats started the PBL regular season with two road losses, but lost only two other games and finished the regular season at 16–4, atop the Atlantic Division. The team was undefeated at home, and undefeated in February, for which Rob Spon got the PBL Coach of the Month award and Desmond Ferguson got a Player of the Week award.

On February 5, the PBL suspended the Montreal Sasquatch and conducted a dispersal draft on February 7. The Millrats selected Jamaal Wise. On March 9, the Millrats traded Wise and other considerations to Quebec for power forward John Ruffus, whom Quebec selected in the same dispersal draft. This was called the PBL's first in-season player trade. On February 13, the Millrats played a scheduled home game against a Montreal team with new roster and ownership.

Vermont remained the principal rival; many Vermont fans made the 130-mile drive. A showdown on February 15 enthused 1,052 fans. February's winning streak ended on March 6 with an overtime loss to Vermont in Burlington, but the Millrats clinched the Atlantic Division the next day in Quebec.

Third-seeded Manchester met the second-seeded Rochester RazorSharks for the best-of-three PBL semifinals. The RazorSharks delayed the third and deciding game four days, blamed on a malfunctioning backboard, and won the game to eliminate the Millrats. Millrats point guard Al Stewart shared post-season honors for the PBL Defensive Player of the Year.

=== 2009–10 season ===
The PBL had massive turnover of franchises and began the 2009–10 season reduced from 13 to 9 teams, playing as a single division. Four teams of the old Atlantic Division returned, except the problematic Montréal franchise. But the entire Midwest Division disappeared. Battle Creek, with the league's best record, quit the PBL over the PBL's decision to hold a one-game league championship in Rochester, denying Battle Creek up to two home dates, and over disagreement over compensation for this decision. In the Eastern Division, Rochester and Buffalo returned, but the Wilmington franchise left, reportedly over loss of nearby competitors. However, the Maryland GreenHawks (formerly the Nighthawks) came out of dormancy, and the PBL picked up the Lawton-Fort Sill Cavalry from the Continental Basketball Association; and the Capitanes de Arecibo, from the Baloncesto Superior Nacional league of Puerto Rico.

Heath Teixeira was promoted to head coach. An exposure combine on October 24–25, 2009, drew over 70 athletes. The Champlain Cup became a three-team tournament hosted by the Vermont Frost Heaves from December 27–29 against the Millrats and the Québec Kebs. The Millrats won the Cup with lopsided victories. The team played no exhibition games at home.

Among players from the previous season, only Al Stewart and Marlowe Currie started the regular season with the Millrats, and they were not with the team by late January. Charles Mason trained with the team and joined the roster in late January, as did P.J. Young. Anthony Anderson rejoined the team after a year's absence, and Charles Easterling joined in mid-season. The Millrats drafted Tyrece Gibbs and Eric Gilchrese, alumni of the University of New Hampshire, with their picks in the PBL player draft. The signing of Luke Bonner on January 15 spurred media interest, as Bonner is from Concord, New Hampshire, and is the brother of Matt Bonner of the San Antonio Spurs. But he played only the weekend of January 16–17 before going to the Austin Toros in the NBA Development League. On January 21, Currie was traded to Halifax.

Admission to the SNHU Fieldhouse remained at $10 ($90 for a ten-game season ticket), but the bleachers on one side were replaced by $17 courtside seating. Mascot Millie the Millrat was not seen, but a dog mascot took his or her place, wearing 00. One home game was moved to Hesser College, and one was moved to UNH, as it featured Keith Friel of the visiting Rochester Razorsharks (the son of former UNH Head Coach Gerry Friel) and the two UNH alumni mentioned above for the Millrats.

=== 2010–11 season ===
In May 2010, a report surfaced that the Millrats ownership was looking to leave Manchester for Saint John, New Brunswick, saying that seating and concessions in the arena were the main impetus for moving. On June 21, 2010, a press conference was held at Harbour Station in Saint John to officially announce the move. A naming contest was held in conjunction with Rogers Communications titled "Got Name?" where fans could text their choice of name via text-messaging. The choices for the names were: Millrats, Fog, Shamrocks, Fire, and Rip Tide. The fans could also select their own. On July 27, Ian McCarthy, president of the team, announced that with overwhelming support, the Mill Rats moniker would remain the same, although a space was added between the two words. A new logo was also unveiled.

The Mill Rats were in contention for most of the regular season, but finished with a record of 9–11, in 5th place, one game out of the playoffs.

The playoffs were notable for New York state-based referees traveling to work several away games involving the Rochester Razorsharks (which share a common owner with the PBL). When this, an uneven number of foul calls, and a final game terminated prematurely by fan reaction marred the semifinal series in Quebec, McCarthy (who had chafed at out-of-state referees during the 2009 playoffs) wrote a protest letter to the league on behalf of his and the other Canadian teams. The same events recurred in the final series, which concluded in the Mill Rats and Rainmen quitting the PBL moments after the playoffs ended. The Kebs followed suit one day later, with Lawton-Fort Sill suspending operations.

=== NBL Canada: 2011–2019 ===
On May 12, 2011, the Mill Rats (along with the existing Halifax and Québec teams of the PBL) were announced as founding members of the National Basketball League of Canada. On October 12, the Mill Rats announced the signing of former Detroit Pistons guard Will Blalock. The team looked forward to intense interest for the season given the 2011 NBA lockout.

After the 2015–16 season, the NBLC announced that the Mill Rats ownership group would no longer continue to operate the team. It voted unanimously to transfer the ownership of the Saint John team to a local ownership group called Saint John Pro Basketball headed by Scott VanWart, Mike Cormier and Paul Vaughan. The new ownership group retained on-and-off franchise head coach, Rob Spon. On 26 October, the new ownership announced the rebranded team would be called the Saint John Riptide.

Spon left Saint John after the 2016–17 season to coach the Cape Breton Highlanders. The Riptide then hired Nelson Terroba as head coach after he had previously served as an assistant with the Erie BayHawks of the NBA Development League.

== Season standings ==
Manchester Millrats/Saint John Mill Rats/Saint John Riptide season-by-season record
Season	League	Games played	Wins	Losses	Average	Play-offs
2007–2008	ABA	40	28	12	.700	Semi-finalist
2009	PBL	20	16	4	.800	Atlantic Division champion
2010	PBL	20	6	14	.300	none
2011	PBL	20	9	11	.450	none
2011–12	NBLC	36	17	19	.472	Lost to London 0–2 in semi-finals
2012–13	NBLC	40	20	20	.500	Lost to Moncton 1–2 in wild card
2013–14	NBLC	40	23	17	.575	Lost to Halifax 1–3 in division semi-finals
2014–15	NBLC	32	17	15	.531	Lost to Island 2–3 in division semi-finals
2015–16	NBLC	40	25	15	.625	Lost to Hurricanes 0–4 in division semi-finals
2016–17	NBLC	40	22	18	.550	Lost to Storm 2–3 in division semifinals
2017–18	NBLC	40	20	20	.500	Lost to Moncton 2–3 in division semifinals
Totals	ABA	40	28	12	.700
Totals	PBL	60	31	29	.518
Totals	NBLC	268	144	124	.537

== Current roster ==
Note: Flags indicate national team eligibility at FIBA-sanctioned events. Players may hold other non-FIBA nationalities not displayed.

Saint John Riptide roster
Players
Coaches

Pos.	No.	Nat.	Name	Ht.	Wt.	Age
PG	4	(United States)	Arrington, Brent	6 ft 3 in (1.91 m)	190 lb (86 kg)	33 – 12 July 1992
G	15	(United States)	Bartley, Frank	6 ft 3 in (1.91 m)	215 lb (98 kg)	31 – 25 February 1994
G	6	(Canada)	Binney, Marvin	6 ft 3 in (1.91 m)	195 lb (88 kg)	34 – 15 December 1990
F	1	(United States)	Dingle, Daniel	6 ft 7 in (2.01 m)	225 lb (102 kg)	31 – 14 February 1994
F	25	(Canada)	Dixon, Renaldo	6 ft 9 in (2.06 m)	225 lb (102 kg)	35 – 20 September 1990
F	0	(United States)	Early, Chris	6 ft 7 in (2.01 m)	235 lb (107 kg)	37 – 5 November 1988
PG	55	(Canada)	Holmes, Andrew	5 ft 10 in (1.78 m)	175 lb (79 kg)
F	33	(United States)	Isom, Mareik	6 ft 10 in (2.08 m)	230 lb (100 kg)	31 – 25 July 1994
SG	34	(Canada)	Landon, Darnell	6 ft 3 in (1.91 m)	190 lb (86 kg)
G	23	(United States)	Mordi, Jeremiah	6 ft 3 in (1.91 m)	193 lb (88 kg)
G	12	(Canada)	Osse, Kemy	6 ft 2 in (1.88 m)	200 lb (91 kg)	32 – 12 March 1993
C	32	(United States)	Phillips, Randy	6 ft 8 in (2.03 m)	245 lb (111 kg)
F	35	(United States)	Pitchford, Walter	6 ft 11 in (2.11 m)	238 lb (108 kg)	33 – 24 April 1992

Head coach

- (United States) Nelson Terroba

Assistant coach(es)

- (Canada) Aaron Drummond
- (Canada) Randy Loatman
- (Canada) Jim Palmer
- (Canada) Paul Vaughan

Legend

- (C) Team captain
- (I) Inactive
- Injured

- Roster
- Transactions
Updated: December 3, 2018

== Notable players ==
- Frank Bartley (born 1994), basketball player for Ironi Ness Ziona of the Israeli Basketball Premier League
