= All-NBL Canada Team =

The All-NBL Canada Team is an annual National Basketball League of Canada honor given to the best players in the league following every NBLC season. It has been presented to a total of fifteen players, divided into three separate five-man lineups, since 2012–13. In the 2011–12 NBL Canada season, the third team was not included. Anthony Anderson holds the record for the most first-team selections, with three. He is followed by Brandon Robinson, who has been named to two such teams.

== Selections ==
| Player (X) | Denotes the number of times the player has been selected |
| **Player** **(in bold text)** | Indicates the player who was NBL Canada MVP in the same year |

| Season | First team | | Second team | | Third team | |
| Season | Players | Teams | Players | Teams | Players | Teams |
|---|---|---|---|---|---|---|
| 2011–12 | **Gabe Freeman** | London Lightning | Tim Ellis | London Lightning | | |
| 2011–12 | Anthony Anderson | Saint John Mill Rats | Omari Johnson | Oshawa Power | | |
| 2011–12 | Ralphy Holmes | Quebec Kebs | Trayvon Lathan | Moncton Miracles | | |
| 2011–12 | Mike Williams | Summerside Storm | Tyrone Levett | Halifax Rainmen | | |
| 2011–12 | Lawrence Wright | Halifax Rainmen | Brandon Robinson | Oshawa Power | | |
| 2012–13 | **Devin Sweetney** | Moncton Miracles | Anthony Anderson (2) | Saint John Mill Rats | Nick Okorie | Oshawa Power |
| 2012–13 | Darren Duncan | Windsor Express | Jerice Crouch | Saint John Mill Rats | Al Stewart | Summerside Storm |
| 2012–13 | Isaac Butts | Moncton Miracles | Tim Ellis | London Lightning | Antonio Ballard | Summerside Storm |
| 2012–13 | Elvin Mims | London Lightning | Quinnel Brown | Halifax Rainmen | Chris Commons | Windsor Express |
| 2012–13 | Brandon Robinson | Summerside Storm | Marvin Phillips | London Lightning | Joey Haywood | Halifax Rainmen |
| 2013–14 | **Anthony Anderson** (3) | Saint John Mill Rats | Ryan Anderson | Windsor Express | Darren Duncan | Windsor Express |
| 2013–14 | Stefan Bonneau | Windsor Express | Morgan Lewis | Mississauga Power | Nick Okorie | Island Storm |
| 2013–14 | Cedric Moodie | Brampton A's | Chris Commons (2) | Windsor Express | Johnny Mayhane | Moncton Miracles |
| 2013–14 | Garrett Williamson | London Lightning | Tim Parham | Halifax Rainmen | Jermaine Johnson | London Lightning |
| 2013–14 | Antonio Ballard | Island Storm | Cavell Johnson | Brampton A's | Jason Williams | Halifax Rainmen |
| 2014–15 | **Quinnel Brown** | Windsor Express | TyShwan Edmondson | Brampton A's | Nick Okorie | Island Storm |
| 2014–15 | Kevin Young | Halifax Rainmen | Tyrone Watson | Halifax Rainmen | Tony Bennett | Windsor Express |
| 2014–15 | Marvin Phillips | London Lightning | Omar Strong | Mississauga Power | Chris Commons (3) | Windsor Express |
| 2014–15 | Brandon Robinson | Island Storm | Kenny Jones | Saint John Mill Rats | Cavell Johnson | Brampton A's |
| 2014–15 | Anthony Anderson (4) | Saint John Mill Rats | DeAndre Thomas | Windsor Express | Trayvon Lathan | Moncton Miracles |
| 2015–16 | Gabe Freeman (2) | Saint John Mill Rats | Anthony Anderson (5) | Saint John Mill Rats | Doug Herring Jr. | Saint John Mill Rats |
| 2015–16 | Justin Johnson | Halifax Rainmen | Chris Commons (4) | Windsor Express | Justin Moss | Orangeville A's |
| 2015–16 | Stephen Maxwell | London Lightning | Mike Glover | Halifax Hurricanes | Akeem Scott | London Lightning |
| 2015–16 | Brandon Robinson | Windsor Express | Kyle Hunt | Halifax Hurricanes | Dexter Strickland | Moncton Miracles |
| 2015–16 | **Logan Stutz** | Niagara River Lions | James Justice | Moncton Miracles | Akeem Wright | London Lightning |
| 2016–17 | Gabe Freeman (3) | Saint John Riptide | Anthony Anderson (6) | Saint John Riptide | Maurice Jones | Windsor Express |
| 2016–17 | Rahlir Hollis-Jefferson | Orangeville A's | Ryan Anderson (2) | London Lightning | Malik Story | Moncton Miracles |
| 2016–17 | Terry Thomas | Island Storm | Jahii Carson | Island Storm | CJ Washington | Halifax Hurricanes |
| 2016–17 | Billy White | Halifax Hurricanes | Cliff Clinkscales | Halifax Hurricanes | Flenard Whitfeild | Kitchener-Waterloo Titans |
| 2016–17 | **Royce White** | London Lightning | Chad Frazier | Cape Breton Highlanders | Garrett Williamson | London Lightning |
| 2017–18 | **Carl English** | St. John's Edge | Charles Hinkle | St. John's Edge | Derek Hall | KW Titans |
| 2017–18 | Terry Thomas (2) | Moncton Magic | Antoine Mason | Halifax Hurricanes | Doug Herring Jr. (2) | London Lightning |
| 2017–18 | Billy White (2) | Halifax Hurricanes | Bruce Massey | Cape Breton Highlanders | Maurice Jones (2) | Windsor Express |
| 2017–18 | Royce White (2) | London Lightning | Du'Vaughn Maxwell | Island Storm | Malcolm Miller | Saint John Riptide |
| 2017–18 | Garrett Williamson (2) | London Lightning | Franklin Session | Island Storm | Jaylon Tate | Niagara River Lions |
| 2018–19 | Frank Bartley | Saint John Riptide | Billy White (3) | Moncton Magic | Alex Johnson | London Lightning |
| 2018–19 | Jaylen Bland | Sudbury Five | Junior Cadougan | St. John's Edge | Aaron Redpath | Cape Breton Highlanders |
| 2018–19 | Guillaume Boucard | London Lightning | Juan Pattillo | Windsor Express | Jason Calliste | Moncton Magic |
| 2018–19 | **Braylon Rayson** | Sudbury Five | Rhamel Brown | Halifax Hurricanes | Gentrey Thomas | Moncton Magic |
| 2018–19 | Jamal Reynolds | Cape Breton Highlanders | Sampson Carter | Island Storm | Tramar Sutherland | KW Titans |
| 2019–20 | Antoine Mason (2) | Halifax Hurricanes | Corey Allmond | Moncton Magic | Montay Brandon | St. John's Edge |
| 2019–20 | Xavier Moon | London Lightning | Jaylen Bland (2) | Sudbury Five | Alex Campbell | Island Storm |
| 2019–20 | Jeremiah Mordi | Moncton Magic | Junior Cadougan (2) | St. John's Edge | Cliff Clinkscales (2) | Halifax Hurricanes |
| 2019–20 | Braylon Rayson (2) | Sudbury Five | Anthony Gaines Jr. | London Lightning | Chris Jones | Windsor Express |
| 2019–20 | **Billy White**(4) | Moncton Magic | Jairus Holder | Sudbury Five | Sam Muldrow | Windsor Express |
