= NBL Canada Canadian of the Year Award =

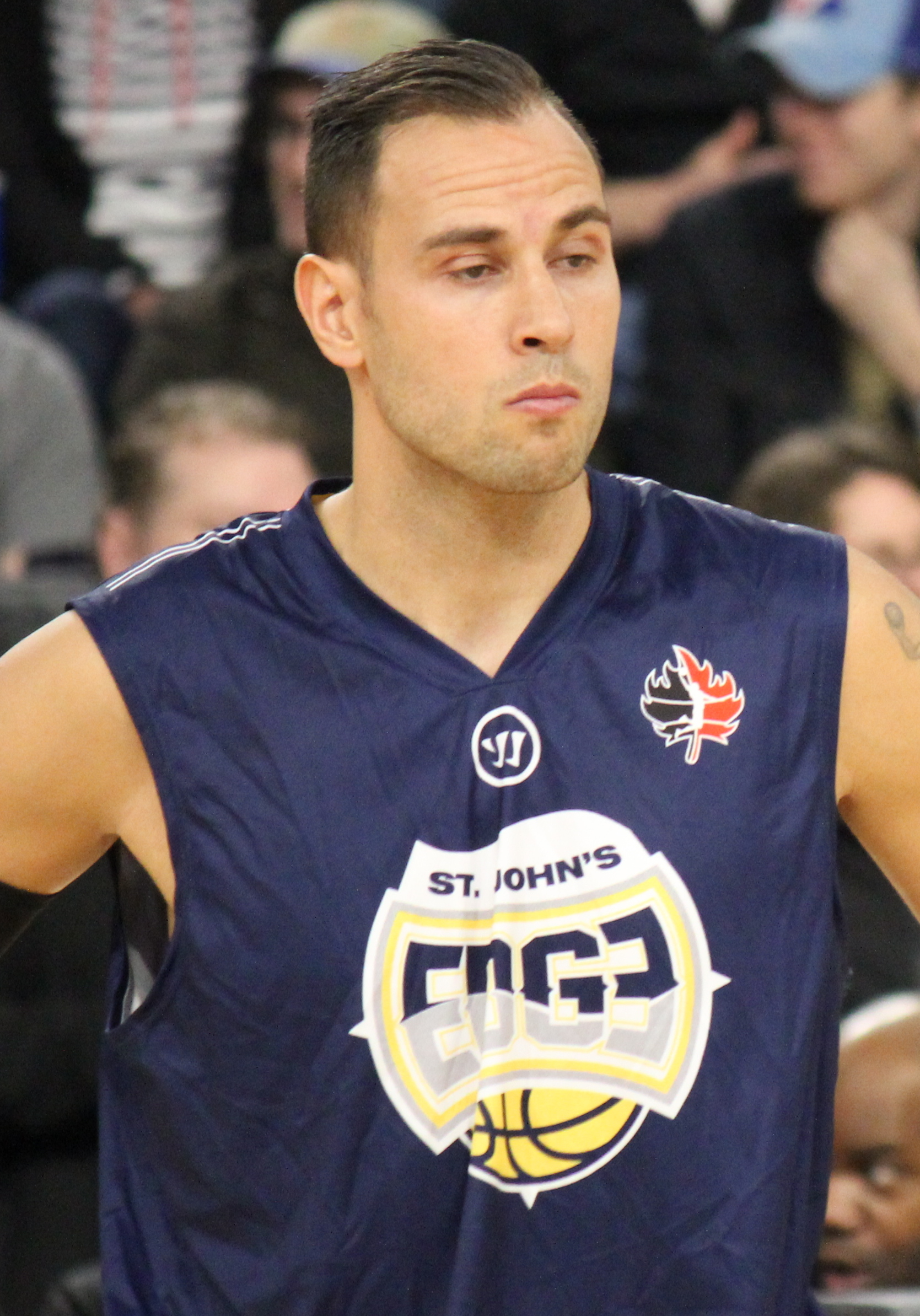
Carl English won the award in 2018.

The National Basketball League of Canada's Canadian of the Year Award is an annual National Basketball League of Canada (NBL) award given since the 2011–12 season. Three of the first four players to have been named Canadian of the Year had competed with the Rainmen in that season.

== Winners ==
| Season | Player | Position | Nationality | Team |
|---|---|---|---|---|
| 2011–12 | Joey Haywood | Guard | Canada | Halifax Rainmen |
| 2012–13 | Joey Haywood (2) | Guard | Canada | Halifax Rainmen |
| 2013–14 | Garrett Williamson | Forward | United States | London Lightning |
| 2014–15 | Tyrone Watson | Forward | Canada | Halifax Rainmen |
| 2015–16 | Warren Ward | Guard | Canada | London Lightning |
| 2016–17 | Terry Thomas | Guard | Canada | Island Storm |
| 2017–18 | Carl English | Guard | Canada | St. John's Edge |
| 2018–19 | Guillaume Boucard | Forward | Canada | Island Storm |
| 2019–20 | Alex Campbell | Guard | Canada | Island Storm |
| 2020–21 | Not awarded — Season cancelled due to COVID-19 pandemic. | | | |
| 2022 | Terry Thomas | Guard | Canada | London Lightning |
