= Anthony Anderson (basketball) =

American basketball player (born 1981)

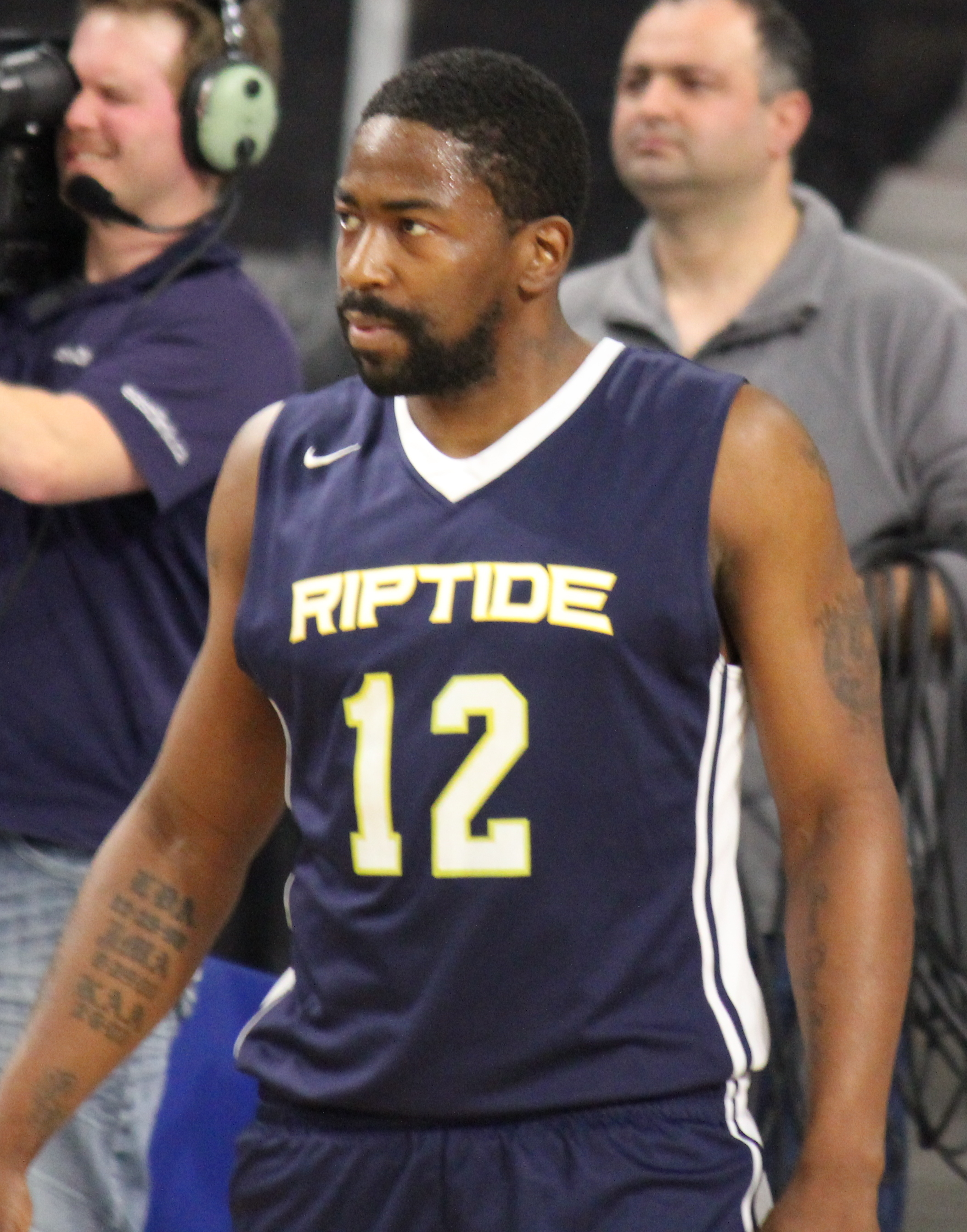
- Anderson in 2017

Personal information
- Born: November 12, 1981 (age 44) Lynn, Massachusetts, U.S.
- Listed height: 5 ft 11 in (1.80 m)
- Listed weight: 185 lb (84 kg)

Career information
- High school: Lynn English (Lynn, Massachusetts)
- College: UMass (2001–2005)
- NBA draft: 2005: undrafted
- Playing career: 2005–present
- Position: Point guard

Career history
- 2007: PAWS London Capital
- 2007–2008: Manchester Millrats (Note: The Saint John Mill Rats were known as the Manchester Millrats until 2010, when they were based in the latter city. The team played in the American Basketball Association from 2007 to 2008 and the Premier Basketball League from 2008 to 2011.)
- 2008–2009: AEK Larnaca
- 2009: Sportino Inowrocław
- 2010–2013: Manchester Millrats / Saint John Mill Rats
- 2013: El Jaish
- 2013–2016: Saint John Mill Rats
- 2016–2017: Saint John Riptide
- 2017–2018: Moncton Magic

Career highlights
- NBL Canada Most Valuable Player (2014); 3× All-NBL Canada First Team (2012, 2014, 2015); 2x NBL Canada scoring champion (2014, 2017); 2× NBL Canada All-Star (2012, 2014); All-NBL Canada Second Team (2013); All-PBL First Team (2011); All-PBL Third Team (2010); ABA Most Valuable Player (2008); All-ABA First Team (2008); ABA All-Star Game MVP (2008); ABA All-Star (2008); Atlantic 10 Rookie of the Year (2002); Atlantic 10 All-Rookie Team (2002)

Anthony Nathaniel Anderson (born November 12, 1981), also known by his initials as Double A, is an American former professional basketball player. Standing 5 ft 11 in (1.80 m), he played the point guard position. Anderson played in the National Basketball League of Canada (NBL) with the Saint John Mill Rats, Saint John Riptide, and Moncton Magic. As of February 2016, he was the league's all-time leading scorer and known as one of its most prominent players. Anderson also played for Saint John and their previous incarnation, the Manchester Millrats, in the Premier Basketball League (PBL) and the American Basketball Association (ABA).

Anderson played four seasons of college basketball under head coach Steve Lappas at the University of Massachusetts Amherst with the Minutemen. He most notably was named Rookie of the Year for the Atlantic 10 Conference in 2002. He closed his college career at UMass as its second-best three-point shooter in school history, behind only Monty Mack. Anderson attended Lynn English High School in Lynn, Massachusetts before college, where he was one of the top basketball players in the Northeastern Conference.

After leaving UMass, Anderson shortly competed as a rookie with the PAWS London Capital following a brief hiatus in his career, in which he only played locally for personal reasons. He later drew the attention of the Millrats, for whom he would play in the 2007–08 season. Anderson then competed in Cyprus and Poland before returning to Manchester. He remained with the team as they relocated to Saint John and the NBL Canada. Midway through his stint with the Mill Rats, Anderson played in Qatar in 2013. His individual accolades in his professional career include ABA All-Star Game MVP, All-ABA First Team, ABA Most Valuable Player, and third and second-team All-PBL. In the NBL Canada, Anderson has appeared on the All-NBL Canada First Team thrice, made the NBL Canada All-Star Game on two occasions, and was named Most Valuable Player in 2014.

Anderson is currently an assistant coach for the Port City Power of The Basketball League.

== Early life ==
Anderson attended Lynn English High School in Lynn, Massachusetts, where he played basketball under head coach Ronald Bennett. He was named Most Valuable Player of the Northeastern Conference as a junior and senior. In his final season with the team, Anderson averaged 24 points, 10 assists, and 9 rebounds and led them to a 19–5 record. He was named to the 2000 Boston Globe All-Scholastic team and became one of the most highly ranked guards in the United States. Bennett said, "In 35 years, he's the best player I've ever had. He sees the floor so well and can always find the open man." Anderson decided to play college basketball for the UMass Minutemen over Florida State, Villanova, and St. John's. He verbally committed to play for UMass and became eligible after initial struggles with his SAT scores.

== College career ==
=== Freshman ===
Anderson quickly became a key part of the Minutemen as a freshman, starting in 26 of the team's 29 games. He had personal ties with teammate Shannon Crooks, who was brought up in the same area of Massachusetts. According to head coach Steve Lappas, Crooks helped Anderson adjust to the college level. Lappas said, "I think he helped Anthony a lot. They're both from Boston so they have a little kinship there and they're pretty close so I think he definitely helped him." On November 16, 2011, Anderson took part in his first official collegiate game against Arkansas–Little Rock, scoring 10 points, grabbing 5 rebounds, and recording 4 assists. He played a team-high 37 minutes as the Minutemen won the game, 66–60. In the days that followed, the point guard would earn Atlantic 10 Conference Rookie of the Week honors. On December 4, 2011, Anderson posted career-highs of 13 points and 7 assists vs. Holy Cross. He eclipsed the scoring total in his following game against Boston College, in which he recorded a team-high 19 points. In this game, Anderson hit three three-pointers in the closing 15.2 seconds, but he could not lead his team to the victory. On January 29, 2002, in a loss to Dayton, Anderson scored a season-high 20 points and made 6 of 7 three-pointers. He became the first Minuteman to record over 5 threes that season and scored double figures for the 10th time as a freshman. In mid-February 2002, Anderson was named co-WHMP/UMass Athlete of the Week after scoring 14 and 11 points against Duquesne and La Salle respectively. By the end of the season, he was averaging 10.0 points, 3.4 rebounds, 3.4 assists, and 1.1 steals. Anderson finished his freshman year by being named Atlantic 10 Rookie of the Week four times—a league-high—and ultimately earned conference All-Rookie and Rookie of the Year honors. He became the fourth Minuteman of all-time to be Freshman, Rookie, or Newcomer of the Year and the first since Marcus Camby in 1994. At the team banquet, Anderson won the Mark Donoghue Most Productive Player Award for "having numbers in every category."

=== Sophomore ===
Anderson opened his sophomore season against the Indiana Hoosiers, scoring 2 points and going 0-of-6 on three-pointers as his team fell, 71–84. However, he led his team with 20 points two games later, in a 14-point win over Chaminade. Anderson said, "I feel like if I'm not scoring I can't get anybody else into the game either. But today I was hitting shots, so I could do other things, like penetrate and kick out to guys." He finished the game with a career-high 9 assists as well. On December 14, 2002, against the Florida International Panthers, Anderson surpassed the 20-point mark for the second time. He was praised by Lappas, "When Anthony plays well, we can win a game ugly. When he doesn't, we can't win at all." Anderson topped his previous scoring record on January 2, 2003, when he posted 25 points vs. NC State and helped his team capture the victory. He also recorded a career-high 9 rebounds. This performance led to Anderson being named Atlantic 10 Player of the Week. The point guard matched his season-best on February 23, 2003, when he scored 25 points against Duquesne and shot 10-of-13 from the field. After completing his sophomore season, Anderson was averaging 11.8 points, 4.3 rebounds, 3.7 assists, 1.3 steals, and 2.6 three-pointers. He was his team's leader in minutes and three-pointers and ranked second in points. Anderson recorded more than 100 assists for the second straight season, becoming the first to do so since 1999. He also made the eighth-most single-season threes in school history.

=== Junior ===
Heading into his junior year, Anderson was named preseason third-team All-Atlantic 10. He became known as the entrenched starting point guard for UMass and was named team captain. He posted a team-high 21 points, 5 rebounds, and 6 assists in his debut vs. St. Francis (NY). Anderson notched a career-high 29 points on December 2, against Vermont, connecting on 7 of his 9 three-point attempts. He was the first Minuteman to accomplish the feat since Monty Mack in March 2001. Anderson also recorded the seventh-most three-pointers in a single game in school history. He said, "When you see a guy hit a couple shots you might want to run a play to get that guy open. So it definitely helps out a lot, it makes it way easier for me." Following another 20-point effort vs. Boston College and a season-best 9 rebounds, he was named Atlantic 10 Player of the Week and Dinn Brothers UMass Athlete of the Week.

Anderson was effective from beyond the arc once more against St. Bonaventure, hitting 6 threes en route to 26 points, although his team lost. He led his team in rebounds as well, with 8. On March 6, 2004, Anderson recorded 9 points, 5 rebounds, and 4 assists in his team's final regular season game vs. Richmond, scoring his 1,000th point for UMass. He became the 36th Minuteman to join the 1,000-point club and the first since former teammate Shannon Crooks in 2002. Anderson closed out the season with 7 points, 7 rebounds, and 3 assists in an Atlantic 10 tournament defeat to Duquesne. He finished the year averaging 12.9 points, 4.3 rebounds, 3.4 assists, and 1.5 steals. At the team banquet, he received the Rick Pitino Assist Award and the Jim Laughnane Free Throw Award. He recorded the third-most three-pointers and seventh-most assists in school history. He also had the sixth-highest minutes per game average for a Minuteman.

=== Senior ===
UMass Minutemen
All-Time Career Three-Pointer Leaders

Player	Years	GP	3PM
Monty Mack	1997–2001	123	331
Ricky Harris	2006–2010	129	276
Anthony Anderson	2001–2005	107	275
Carmelo Travieso	1993–1997	130	245
Rafer Giles	1987–1991	115	221

Anderson opened his senior stint on November 23, 2004, with 14 points, 3 assists, and 5 steals against Birmingham–Southern. In his next appearance vs. Yale, despite scoring only six points, he posted a career-high 13 rebounds. Teammate Stéphane Lasme added 10 boards. Lappas said, "What else do you say about Anthony Anderson? He had thirteen rebounds in the game. Its great to see Anthony have six points in the game and win. We couldn't have one a game like this in a million years with Anthony Anderson only scoring six points. You don't even notice it now, where when he didn't score before we almost didn't have a chance. It's good for him to go out there and play and direct these kids that he has out there under him." In mid-December 2004, Anderson was suspended for three games after failing a drug test. Lappas called it a "violation of team rules."

Following his return, Anderson scored a season-high 23 points against Fordham on January 19, 2005. He represented UMass for the 100th time on January 22 vs. Saint Joseph's, as he recorded 16 points, 7 rebounds, and 7 assists. On February 12, he scored 4 points to become the 20th-best scorer in school history. However, he suffered from back injuries that would keep him from playing in five games and the Atlantic 10 tournament. After his senior year, Anderson was averaging 10.2 points, 4.7 rebounds, 2.9 assists, 1.9 steals, and 2.4 three-pointers. He finished his collegiate career with the second-most threes, the third-most steals, the fifth-highest three-point field goal percentage, the seventh-most assists, and the 19th most points in school history. In 2010, Ricky Harris passed Anderson for the second-most three-pointers in Minutemen history, with 276.

=== Statistics ===
Cited from ESPN.

Year	Team	GP	GS	MPG	FG%	3P%	FT%	RPG	APG	SPG	BPG	PPG
2001–02	UMass	29	26	34.0	.408	.388	.453	3.4	3.4	1.1	0.1	10.0
2002–03	UMass	29	28	36.1	.417	.392	.757	4.3	3.7	1.3	0.1	11.8
2003–04	UMass	29	28	38.1	.415	.387	.812	4.3	3.4	1.5	0.1	12.9
2004–05	UMass	20	18	35.8	.431	.397	.640	4.7	2.9	1.9	0.1	10.2
Career		107	100	36.0	.418	.391	.666	4.2	3.4	1.5	0.1	11.2

== Professional career ==
=== Early pro years (2007–2008) ===
"I saw Anthony play in an outdoor tournament in New Bedford in 2006, and then the following summer in Lynn, Massachusetts ... I was absolutely convinced that he was an amazing talent."

— Ian McCarthy, Manchester Millrats GM.

Following his graduation, Anderson returned to his alma mater and began serving as an assistant coach at Lynn English High School under Buzzy Barton. He could not join a professional team because of family problems and worked as a debt collector to support his family. Instead, Anderson competed in Boston Weekend League and became a prominent streetball player in the area. In August 2007, Anderson drew the attention of Steve Bucknall, head coach of the PAWS London Capital of the British Basketball League (BBL), when he took part in a local summer basketball tournament known as the Hoganz Basketball Classic. At the event, Anderson scored 51 points against Detroit Pistons player Will Blalock and led his Lynn-based team to the championship by hitting a buzzer-beating three-pointer in the finals. Later in the month, Anderson signed his first professional contract with London Capital for the team's inaugural season. He commented on his move to the new country, "England was by far the worst situation I ever been in since playing overseas." Anderson also experienced culture shock while living there. In his time with London Capital, he most notably scored 32 points in a single game.

On November 12, 2007, Anderson returned to the United States and was signed by the Manchester Millrats of the American Basketball Association (ABA). General manager Ian McCarthy said, "Anthony gives us another super-talented point guard who can also break down the defense and really light up the scoreboard." Anderson was unable to play in the team's first game due to a bruised collar bone. By January 1, 2008, Anderson was averaging 32.4 points per game. In mid-February, he was averaging 22.8 points, shooting 69% from the field and 48% on three-pointers. Among his most notable performances was when he scored 43 points to lead Manchester to a 133–123 win over the Boston Blizzard on January 26. He made all 10 of his two-point shots and was 17-of-23 from the field. ProBasketballNews.com ranked him the top ABA player and the third-best minor league basketball player in the country, above players such as Ian Mahinmi, Eddie Gill, and Elton Brown. On March 17, Anderson was named to the ABA All-Star Game. He scored 19 points in the first half of the game, propelling his East team to an 18-point lead at halftime. His game-high 33 points helped him win the Halogen Records ABA All-Star Most Valuable Player Award. Manchester owner Jason Briggs said, "We are very proud of Anthony. He is a super-star in the making and he has a great work ethic and is very humble to boot." On April 1, 2008, Anderson was named first-team All-ABA and won the league's Most Valuable Player Award. On March 19, 2010, he was named second-team ABA All-Decade, an award for the top players in the league from 2000 to 2009.

=== Overseas ventures (2008–2010) ===
Anderson's strong performance in his rookie season helped him participate in a three-day tryout for the NBA's Indiana Pacers in June 2008. He expected to take part in the team's training camp, but a trade involving Jarrett Jack and T. J. Ford led him to never receive the invitation. On August 9, 2008, Anderson signed a contract with AEK Larnaca B.C. of the Cyprus Basketball Division 1. He finished the season averaging 17.8 points, 4.0 rebounds, and 4.2 assists, with the second-most assists in the league and the most points. In an interview with SLAM Online, Anderson said, "It was very good competition. It's just like when you see European guys in the NBA. There are a lot of skilled and crafty players, not overly athletic but very skilled." He played against players such as Bradley Buckman while in Cyprus. After the season concluded, Eurobasket.com named Anderson 2nd Team All-Cyprus League.

On August 21, 2009, Anderson signed with the Polish club Sportino Inowrocław of the Tauron Basket Liga. He debuted with his new team on October 10, 2009, when he recorded 13 points, 5 rebounds, and 2 assists vs. Polpharma Starogard Gdański. He recorded a season-high 6 assists on October 24, against Anwil KK Włocławek, but his team lost the game, 60–82. In his next appearance, Anderson finished with a season-high 6 steals vs. Turów Zgorzelec. On November 8, he notched a season-best 17 points and matched his record of 6 assists against Asseco Prokom Gdynia. Anderson played only 7 minutes in his final game with Sportino Inowrocław, scoring 0 points. He capped his career in the Polish League averaging 9.9 points, 3.2 rebounds, and 3.3 assists in 28.5 minutes per game.

=== Return to Manchester (2010–2011) ===
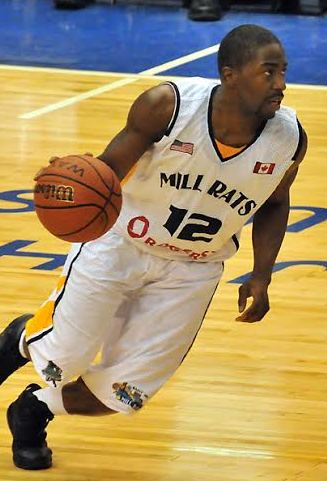
Anderson dribbles the ball for the Mill Rats in 2011.

Anderson returned to the Manchester Millrats in 2010, after the team joined the Premier Basketball League (PBL). In January, he averaged 23.4 points and shot .600 from the floor in 7 appearances. By February 3, 2010, he led the league in scoring and assists. At this time, Anderson was evaluated by Trotamundos de Carabobo of the Liga Profesional de Baloncesto (LPB) in Venezuela and was expected to sign the overseas contract. However, he would never play for the team. He then returned to the Manchester Millrats and made his first appearance since the tryout on February 20, 2010, making a buzzer-beating jumper to top the Vermont Frost Heaves. The next day, Anderson scored 23 points against Puerto Rico Capitanes, the combined performances helping him win Player of the Week honors. In late March, Anderson was named to the PBL All-Star Game with teammate Stanley Ocitti. He was leading the Millrats in scoring, averaging 20.2 points per game, assists, and three-pointers. By the end of the season, he was also named third-team All-League.

Anderson came back for another PBL season with the Saint John Mill Rats in 2011. The team had changed locations from Manchester, New Hampshire to Saint John, New Brunswick in Canada prior to the start of the season. Anderson debuted on January 2, 2011 in a loss against the Quebec Kebs, in which he recorded a team-high 20 points, 6 assists, and 4 steals. He had another notable scoring performance on January 21, when he poured 24 points on the Rochester RazorSharks. In the next two contests, Anderson recorded season-highs of 9 assists and 7 rebounds vs. the Halifax Rainmen and tied his season-bests of 24 points and 9 assists in a rematch against the Quebec Kebs. The three games led to him being named PBL Player of the Week on February 10, 2011. On March 17, Anderson scored a season-high 32 points with 12-of-24 shooting and 5 three-pointers vs. the Halifax Rainmen. He also contributed 6 assists and 4 rebounds. As the season came to a conclusion, he was named second-team All-PBL.

=== Move to Canada (2011–2013) ===
The Saint John Mill Rats moved to the newly created National Basketball League of Canada (NBL) for the 2011–12 season. Anderson debuted in the league by recording 14 points, 5 assists, and 3 steals in a 96–112 loss to the Summerside Storm on November 4, 2011. In a rematch with the same team less than one week later, he posted 25 points, although his team was still defeated by one point. Anderson scored a season-high 35 points in a 106–90 win over the Storm on November 17, hitting three of four three-pointers. He recorded 20 points in the second half alone. After leading his team in points in three of four games, Anderson earned Player of the Week honors on November 20. The point guard posted his first double-double of the season with 10 points and 10 assist in a 5-point victory over the Halifax Rainmen on December 2, despite making no treys. He was effective again on December 29, scoring 31 points vs. the London Lightning and adding 11 assists. However, on January 3, 2012, Anderson injured his hand in a defeat to the Moncton Miracles and was expected to be sidelined for three to four weeks. General manager Ian McCarthy said, "This really stung because we were unable to finish the game strong against Moncton with Anthony out, and now we have a road game 48 hours later against a tough Quebec team." The Mill Rats responded by signing two players, including Darren Duncan. Anderson returned to the court in a rematch with the Miracles on February 1, notching 15 points and 7 assists. In the remainder of the regular season, he recorded 2 double-doubles and had three games in which he scored 20 or more points. In Game 1 of the NBL Canada Playoffs vs the London Lightning, Anderson recorded 26 points and 12 assists, going 6-of-7 from beyond the arc and 4-of-4 on free throws. He put up another 19 points in the second game. However, Saint John was swept 0–2 in the best-of-3 series and London went on to win the 2012 NBL Canada Finals.

On September 14, 2012, Anderson re-signed with the Saint John Mill Rats. Ian McCarthy said, "He's an elite player at any level and is our leader in our pursuit of championship." The general manager also commented on Anderson, saying that he was their franchise player. Anderson also joined Saint John for training camp. David Cooper would be named head coach for the Mill Rats for the 2012–13 NBL Canada season. Anderson made his regular season debut on November 2, 2012, putting up 24 points, 7 assists, and 5 rebounds vs. the Summerside Storm. In his following appearance, he recorded a double-double of 24 points and 12 rebounds as the Mill Rats defeated the Montreal Jazz. Anderson had another notable performance on January 13, 2013, with 28 points and 10 rebounds vs. the Moncton Miracles. In another game against the Miracles on January 24, he scored 20 points, recorded 14 assists, and grabbed 7 rebounds. In his next contest, in a victory over the Jazz, Anderson scored 35 points. He followed up by notching a career-best 43 points on January 30, 2013, vs. the Miracles. However, he left the Mill Rats in mid-February and did not take part in the NBL Canada playoffs after signing a contract with El Jaish of the Qatari Basketball League. Anderson capped his season in the Canadian league averaging 21.1 points, 4.4 rebounds, 7.1 assists, and two steals per game. With El Jaish, he reached the finals of the Emirates Cup and the semifinals of the Qatar Cup. Anderson later remarked that Qatar was one of his favorite countries to live in, as well as Cyprus.

=== MVP season and beyond (2013–2018) ===
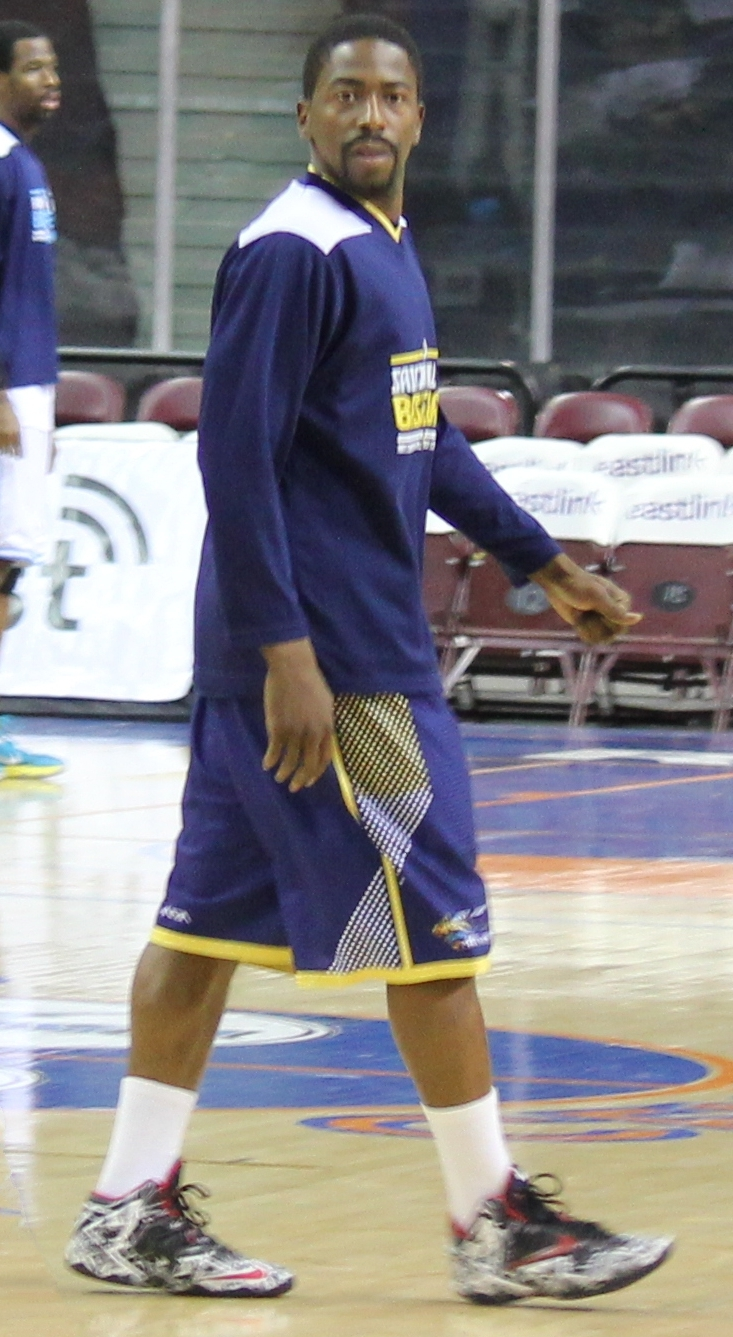
Anderson in March 2014.

On September 13, 2013, Anderson agreed to terms to return to the Mill Rats for the 2013–14 season. He hoped to carry his team to the championship with new head coach Rob Spon. Spon commented, "I've finally got my wish to coach [Anderson] come true. Instead of watching him torch me, I get to help him unleash his potential on other teams." In his season debut on November 1, 2013, Anderson scored 23 points in a road win over the Halifax Rainmen. In a loss to the Moncton Miracles two games later on November 9, he added 28 points and seven assists. On November 24, Anderson recorded his first double-double of the season vs. the Miracles, with 22 points and 13 rebounds. Anderson had a 34-point performance in another rematch with Moncton on December 12, 2013. In late December, he scored over 30 points in back-to-back games against the Rainmen. Entering January 1, 2014, Anderson led the Mill Rats in scoring and stood 0.15 points per game behind Stefan Bonneau for being the top scorer in the NBL Canada. On January 16 and 17, he scored 37 and 39 points respectively against the Island Storm. On January 24, Anderson scored a season-high 40 points and recorded nine assists in another contest vs. the Storm. Despite holding an early lead, the Mill Rats were eventually defeated by the Island. In early February 2014, Anderson scored over 30 points in consecutive games against the Mississauga Power and the Brampton A's of the Central Division. He tied his season-best of 40 points in a victory over the Rainmen on February 23, with a season-high of seven three-pointers. Anderson scored 19 points in the third quarter and scored 15 straight at one point as well. In early April, he was named to the 2014 NBL Canada All-Star Game. Anderson helped the Atlantic Division capture the win, contributing 21 points, 12 assists, and nine rebounds. On April 19, 2014, Anderson won the Most Valuable Player award. He finished the season as the league's all-time leading scorer, with 2,121 points. Anderson later reflected on the year, saying, "I have never been on a team that was so together from the coach all the way down to the last guy ... it was a family for real."

Anderson returned to the Mill Rats for the 2014–15 season on September 17, 2014. Ian McCarthy described him as the team's "franchise player since we have been in existence." The Mill Rats also replaced Spon with head coach Julian King. In his season opener, Anderson scored 21 points and recorded seven assists to push Saint John past the Miracles on November 1, 2014. In his next game vs. the Storm on November 6, he notched 19 points and 10 rebounds and followed up with another double-double against the same team, with 14 points and 14 assists. On November 21, 2014, Anderson dropped 31 points on the A's and topped that performance with 34 points against the Storm in his following appearance. However, the two contests resulted in defeats. He was a candidate to earn Player of the Week honors, but the award went to Brandon Robinson instead. On November 30, he scored a season-high 39 points in a loss to the Storm. Anderson had 31 points and seven assists in his next game vs. the Rainmen. He scored 30 or more points in just one of the remaining 16 regular season games, and the Mill Rats exited the playoffs after losing in the first round to the Storm, 2–3, in the best-of-five series.

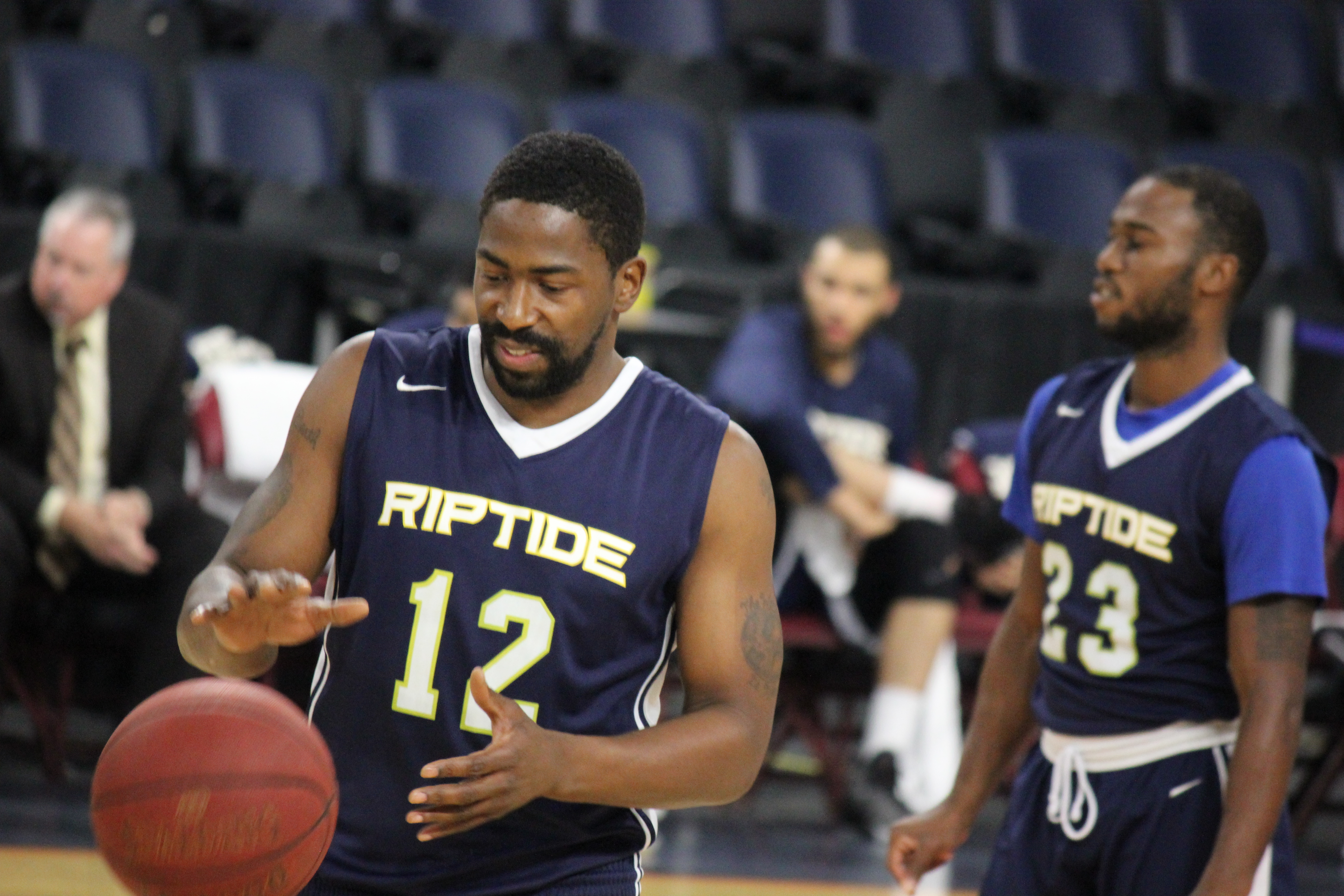
Anderson with the Riptide in 2017.

On November 19, 2015, Anderson re-signed with the Mill Rats along with fellow former NBL Canada MVP, Gabe Freeman. He reunited with Rob Spon, who spent the previous season with the Rochester Razorsharks. Spon said, "Anthony and Gabe are two of the best players I have coached. To have them together on the same team is going to be something special to see. Both of them are winners and leaders and they will make my job that much easier." Anderson debuted with a double-double, scoring 24 points and adding 10 assists in a victory over the Storm on December 26, 2015. On December 30, Anderson paced Saint John with 33 points, pairing with Doug Herring, Jr. to lead the team to a win over the Miracles. He nearly achieved a triple-double in an overtime loss to the Halifax Hurricanes on January 3, 2016, putting up 19 points, 10 assists, and 8 rebounds. He made a three-pointer with 25 seconds left in regulation, but Hurricanes' Shane Gibson equalized the score and forced overtime. Anderson would not score 20 or more points for 11 consecutive games, before notching 32 against Moncton on February 6. He recorded career-highs of 51 points and nine three-pointers in a 147–102 win over the Orangeville A's on February 18, breaking the Mill Rats' single-game records in both categories. Two days after his performance, he was named the league's Player of the Week.

On October 23, 2017, Anderson signed with the Moncton Magic.

In July 2024, Anderson signed with the Port City Power for the team's inaugural season. However, the team folded before ever playing.

== Personal life ==
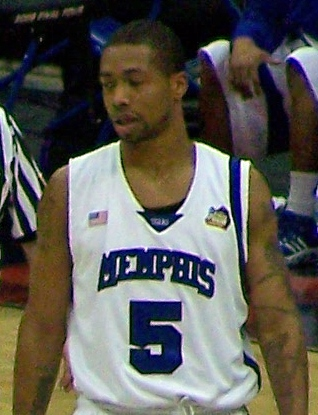
Anderson's brother, Antonio (pictured), played college basketball at Memphis.

Anthony is the older brother of Antonio Anderson, who is currently the head coach for the boys basketball team at Lynn English High School. Antonio played college basketball with the Memphis Tigers under head coach John Calipari and was most notably named Conference USA Defensive Player of the Year in 2009. He has experience playing professional basketball in the NBA Development League and outside North America. He also played alongside Anthony with the Saint John Mill Rats in 2012. The National Basketball Association (NBA) team, the Oklahoma City Thunder, signed him to multiple 10-day contracts in February 2010. The two brothers' uncle, Marvin Avery, said, "There's some in our family that have been in trouble, but we always had Antonio and his brother [Anthony] playing basketball or traveling somewhere to play basketball at all times." When Anthony began playing at UMass, his younger brother became frustrated with basketball and wanted to play American football instead. However, Anthony and his uncles convinced him to continue playing basketball.

In the summer, Anthony often holds basketball camps and runs a pro–am league. His longtime girlfriend and wife is Krista Morris, who he met after one of his games. Morris came in contact with Anderson because her friend was dating an assistant coach on the Mill Rats. The two later bought a home for themselves. Anderson has a son, Jacari, who was born in mid-2015.

In 2023, Anderson was named the "Greatest Player in NBL Canada History" voted by the coaches, GMs, and owners of the league's 10-year history.

== See also ==
- List of NBL Canada All-Stars
- List of National Basketball League of Canada career scoring leaders
- List of National Basketball League of Canada season scoring leaders
