= Kevin Keathley =

American basketball coach

Current position
- Title: Head Coach
- Team: Mavericks

Biographical details
- Born: South Carolina

Coaching career (HC unless noted)
- 1998–2000: Lees College (asst.)
- 2001–2002: St. Catherine College (asst.)
- 2003–2004: Louisville Eagles (asst.)
- 2004–2006: Kentucky Colonels
- 2006–2007: Rio Grande Valley Silverados
- 2007–2009: East Kentucky Miners
- 2009–2010: Southeast Texas Mavericks
- 2011: Bakersfield Jam
- 2011–2012: Sauk Valley Predators
- 2013: Ottawa SkyHawks
- 2014–2016: Bowling Green Bandits
- 2016 (preseason only): Halifax Hurricanes
- 2021–present: Shreveport Mavericks

Head coaching record
- Overall: 226–118(.65.7)

Accomplishments and honors

Championships
- 2

Records
- Assistant Coach

Kevin Keathley is a basketball coach and author.

== Coaching career ==
=== Lees College ===
In 1998 Kevin Keathley was appointed top assistant coach of the Lees College men's basketball team in Jackson, Kentucky, at the time becoming the youngest coach in American college basketball at the age of 21. Lees College achieved back-to-back winning seasons during his tenure. The team also earned a national ranking in the NJCAA D3 Top 25 ranking during the 1998–1999 season. Keathley's tenure at Lees College also included a stint as Interim Head Coach which marked a significant milestone in his career, establishing him as a rising star in coaching before transitioning to a special assistant role at Brevard College for the 2000–2001 season.

=== Brevard College ===
In 2000, at the age of 23, Kevin Keathley joined Brevard College as a Special Assistant Coach for the men's basketball team under head coach Mike Jones. At the time, he was among the youngest college coaches in the United States, bringing a fresh perspective to the then NAIA program. During his tenure from 2000 to 2001 Keathley assisted with game planning, recruiting efforts, contributing to the Tornados' competitive performance in their conference. His role emphasized scouting, laying the foundation for his later success in professional and collegiate coaching. Keathley departed Brevard in 2001 to pursue further opportunities in college basketball (Saint Catharine College.)

=== Saint Catharine College ===
Following his stint at Brevard College, Keathley joined the coaching staff at Saint Catharine College, where the Patriots averaged 95.6 points per game in 2002.

=== Louisville Eagles (UPBL) ===
After two years at Saint Catharine, Keathley was named Associate Coach for the Louisville Eagles of the UPBL. In 2003, the Louisville Eagles won the UPBL championship.

=== Bellarmine University ===
Assistant Coach at Bellarmine. Keathley would resign to coach the Kentucky Colonels.

=== Kentucky Colonels (ABA) ===
In 2004 Keathley was named head coach of the ABA's Kentucky Colonels. The Keathley-coached Colonels finished the 2005 season 21–12, falling to eventual champion Arkansas in the second round of the playoffs. In 2005 Keathley was named ABA (American Basketball Association) Coach of the Year as the coach of the Kentucky Colonels. At the time he was the youngest coach in all of pro basketball. The following year, he was named one of the top ten young coaches in America by Probasketballnews.com.

=== Rio Grande Valley Silverados ===
On leaving the Kentucky Colonels in 2006, Keathley spent one season as the head assistant coach for the Rio Grande Valley Silverados, also in the ABA and CBA.

=== East Kentucky Miners (CBA) ===
In 2007, Keathley was hired as the inaugural head coach of the East Kentucky Miners, an expansion franchise in the CBA based in Pikeville, Kentucky. At 28 years old, he became one of the youngest head coaches at the professional level, bringing his college-honed expertise to the pro ranks. Keathley's "high Octane Offense"—a high-octane, run-and-gun system focused on rapid transitions, unselfish ball movement, and maximizing possessions—quickly defined the team.

The Miners led the CBA in scoring during both the 2007–08 and 2008–09 seasons, averaging over 110 points per game. This offensive explosion set multiple league records and propelled the team to the playoffs in their debut year, finishing 26–22. A highlight came on March 2, 2008, when the Miners shattered the CBA single-game scoring mark with a 194–115 rout of conference foe Atlanta, outrebounding their opponents 66–29 and recording 45 assists. Eight players scored in double figures, led by Mike Dean's 44 points. The victory underscored Keathley's philosophy of player unselfishness and relentless pace, with the team outscoring Atlanta 42–12 in the first quarter alone.

The 2008–09 Keathley's impact was evident: the team remained the league's top-scoring unit, and he was named CBA Coach of the Month for December 2008 after a 7–0 stretch that included wins like 172–70 over West Virginia. In recognition of his innovative schemes and success with a young roster blending veterans and prospects, Keathley was selected to Pro Basketball News' list of the "Top 10 Pro Coaches Not in the NBA" in 2009—one of several such honors during his career.

Following his CBA stint, the Miners transitioned to the ABA in July 2009, but Keathley departed for other opportunities.

=== South East Texas Mavericks (ABA) ===
During the 2009–2010 season Keathley would serve as associate head coach for the South East Texas Mavericks located in Beaumont, Texas. Kevin Keathley would win the 2010 American Basketball Association Championship. South East Texas would lead the ABA in scoring and finish with a 28–4 record. Keathley was named Associate Coach of the Year in 2010.

=== Bakersfield Jam (NBA D-League) ===
In 2011 Kevin Keathley would serve as assistant coach for the Bakersfield Jam of the NBA Development League. Keathley would leave to accept the head coaching position with the Sauk Valley Predators of the Premier Basketball League (PBL).

=== Sauk Valley Predators (PBL) ===
Kevin Keathley served as head coach of the Sauk Valley Predators. During the 2011–2012 season, Keathley guided the Predators to the semi-finals of the Premier Basketball League (PBL) playoffs in 2012. The Predators finished the year leading the PBL in team scoring and a 3rd-place finish overall. In 2012, Keathley was selected to serve as coach of the NBA Development Leagues National Try-Out Camp.

=== Ottawa SkyHawks (NBL Canada) ===
Keathley was announced as Ottawa SkyHawks first ever head coach prior to the start of the 2013–14 NBL Canada season. After a disappointing 4–3 start to their inaugural season, Keathley was relieved of his duties.

=== Bowling Green Bandits (ABA) ===
Keathley was the head coach of the Bowling Green Bandits of the ABA. He led Bowling Green to a 20–3 overall record during the 2014–15 season. He would coach Bowling Green for two seasons.

=== Halifax Hurricanes (NBL Canada) ===
In 2016 Keathley was hired as the head coach and general manager of the Halifax Hurricanes in the National Basketball League of Canada. However, he would leave the team during the preseason for personal reasons.

=== Shreveport Mavericks (TBL) ===
In the 2020–2022 seasons Keathley served as the associate head coach and director of player personnel for the Shreveport Mavericks.

=== Morehead State University ===
In 2022, Keathley joined Morehead State University as Director of Player Development for the Eagles women's basketball program in the Ohio Valley Conference. In this off-court role, he focused on skill enhancement, scheduling, recruitment and scouting, drawing on his extensive professional experience to bridge college and pro transitions. His stint also included on court player development.

== Non-coaching career ==
Keathley has written a book on the game of basketball entitled Hardwood Constitution: A Blueprint to Coaching Success, ISBN 1-59330-221-5.
