= Johnny Mayhane =

American basketball player

No. 23 – Saint John Mill Rats
- Position: Shooting guard / small forward
- League: NBL Canada

Personal information
- Born: December 9, 1986 (age 39) Mobile, Alabama
- Listed height: 6 ft 5 in (1.96 m)
- Listed weight: 205 lb (93 kg)

Career information
- High school: LeFlore (Mobile, Alabama)
- College: Tulane (2007–2011)
- NBA draft: 2011: undrafted
- Playing career: 2011–present

Career history
- 2011–2012: Rochester Razorsharks (PBL)
- 2013: Panama City Breeze (ABL)
- 2013–2014: Moncton Miracles (Canada)
- 2014: Island Storm (Canada)
- 2014–present: Saint John Mill Rats (Canada)

Career highlights
- NBL Canada All-Star (2014); Third-team All-NBL Canada (2014)

Johnny Ray Mayhane, Jr. (born December 9, 1986) is an American professional basketball player who currently plays for the Saint John Mill Rats of the National Basketball League of Canada (NBL). He played college basketball for Tulane.

== Collegiate career ==
Mayhane played college basketball at Tulane University.

== Professional career ==
Mayhane earned All-NBL Canada honors as a Moncton Miracle in the 2013–14 season and was named an All-Star.
