= Trayvon Lathan =

American basketball player (born 1984)

Personal information
- Born: May 16, 1984 (age 42)
- Listed height: 6 ft 7 in (2.01 m)
- Listed weight: 200 lb (91 kg)

Career information
- High school: Deep Creek (Chesapeake, Virginia)
- College: Chowan (2003–2007)
- NBA draft: 2007: undrafted
- Playing career: 2007–present
- Position: Small forward

Career history
- 2009–2010: Anibal Zahle
- 2010–2011: Al Mouttahed Tripoli
- 2011: Oettinger Rockets
- 2011–2012: Moncton Miracles
- 2012–2013: Halifax Rainmen
- 2013–2014: Moncton Miracles
- 2014: Tijuana Zonkeys
- 2014–2015: Moncton Miracles
- 2015–2018: Tijuana Zonkeys

Career highlights
- 3× CIBACOPA champion (2014, 2015, 2018); NBL Canada All-Star (2012); Second-team All-NBL Canada (2012); Third-team All-NBL Canada (2015); NBL Canada All-Defence Team (2014); First-team All-USA South (2004); USA South Rookie of the Year (2004)

Trayvon Lathan (born May 16, 1984) is an American former professional basketball player. He played college basketball at Chowan University and went on to become an NBL Canada All-Star with the Moncton Miracles of the National Basketball League of Canada (NBL). Lathan is a native of Chesapeake, Virginia and attended Deep Creek High School in the same area.

After winning his third CIBACOPA title with the Tijuana Zonkeys in 2018, Lathan retired from professional basketball. He was inducted into the Chowan Athletic Hall of Fame in 2019.
