= 2016–17 NBL Canada season =

- League: National Basketball League of Canada
- Sport: Basketball
- Duration: December 26, 2016 – April 30, 2017
- Games: 40
- Teams: 10
- TV partner(s): EastLink TV, The Score, Rogers Media

Draft
- Top draft pick: ?
- Picked by: ?

Regular Season
- Top seed: London Lightning
- Season MVP: Royce White
- Top scorer: ?

Playoffs
- Atlantic champions: Halifax Hurricanes
- Central champions: London Lightning

Finals
- Champions: London Lightning

NBL Canada seasons
- ← 2015–16 2017–18 →

The 2016–17 NBL Canada season was the sixth season of the National Basketball League of Canada (NBLC).

== League changes ==
The league added two teams for 2016–17: the Cape Breton Highlanders in Sydney, Nova Scotia, and the KW Titans in Kitchener, Ontario. The Saint John Mill Rats franchise also transferred ownership and was rebranded to the Saint John Riptide.

=== Offseason coaching changes ===
- The Cape Breton Highlanders hired Dean Murray as their inaugural head coach.
- The Halifax Hurricanes hired Kevin Keathley to replace Hugo López. However, Keathley left the team in the pre-season for personal reasons and was then replaced by Mike Leslie.
- The KW Titans hired Serge Langis as their inaugural head coach.
- The Orangeville A's hired Brandon Lesovsky to replace Chris Thomas
- The Saint John Riptide retained Rob Spon as head coach during the franchise transition.
- The Windsor Express' head coach from 2014–15, Bill Jones, returned from his one-year suspension.

=== Midseason coaching changes ===
- The Cape Breton Highlanders relieved inaugural head coach Dean Murray of his duties on January 22, 2017. The team promoted assistant coach Ben Resner to replace Murray.
- The Niagara River Lions' head coach Grâce Lokole stepped down from his position and became the assistant coach on March 11, 2017. The team named current Niagara College head coach Keith Vassell as the interim head coach.

== Teams ==
2016-17 National Basketball League of Canada
Division	Team	City	Arena	Capacity
Atlantic	Cape Breton Highlanders	Sydney, Nova Scotia	Centre 200	5,000
Atlantic	Halifax Hurricanes	Halifax, Nova Scotia	Scotiabank Centre	10,500
Atlantic	Island Storm	Charlottetown, Prince Edward Island	Eastlink Centre	4,000
Atlantic	Moncton Miracles	Moncton, New Brunswick	Moncton Coliseum	6,554
Atlantic	Saint John Riptide	Saint John, New Brunswick	Harbour Station	6,603
Central	KW Titans	Kitchener, Ontario	Kitchener Memorial Auditorium	7,312
Central	London Lightning	London, Ontario	Budweiser Gardens	9,000
Central	Niagara River Lions	St. Catharines, Ontario	Meridian Centre	4,030
Central	Orangeville A's	Orangeville, Ontario	Athlete Institute	1,000
Central	Windsor Express	Windsor, Ontario	WFCU Centre	6,500

=== Map of teams ===
Atlantic Division Central Division

== Regular season ==
Atlantic Division

#	Atlantic Division	W	L	PCT	GB	Div	GP
1	c — Halifax Hurricanes	27	13	.675	—	22–8	40
2	x — Saint John Riptide	22	18	.550	5.0	14–15	40
3	x — Island Storm	16	24	.400	11.0	13–16	40
4	x — Moncton Miracles	15	25	.375	12.0	12–18	40
5	Cape Breton Highlanders	15	25	.375	12.0	13–17	40

Central Division

#	Central Division	W	L	PCT	GB	Div	GP
1	z — London Lightning	35	5	.875	—	26–4	40
2	x — Windsor Express	22	18	.550	13.0	16–14	40
3	x — KW Titans	18	22	.450	17.0	11–19	40
4	x — Orangeville A's	16	24	.400	19.0	11–19	40
5	Niagara River Lions	14	26	.350	21.0	10–20	40

Notes

- z – Clinched home court advantage for the entire playoffs
- c – Clinched home court advantage for the division playoffs
- x – Clinched playoff spot

=== Attendance ===
Pos	Team	Total	High	Low	Average	Change
1	London Lightning	104,142	7,852	1,090	5,207	−8.0%
2	Island Storm	38,686	2,371	1,242	1,934	−0.8%
3	Halifax Hurricanes	38,512	3,583	1,192	1,926	−0.2%
4	Saint John Riptide	37,124	3,014	1,028	1,856	+4.6%
5	Niagara River Lions	35,055	3,287	1,150	1,753	+34.3%
6	Moncton Miracles	30,613	2,195	1,078	1,531	−0.9%
7	Cape Breton Highlanders	29,490	3,200	991	1,475	n/a^{1}
8	KW Titans	26,107	2,240	709	1,305	n/a^{1}
9	Windsor Express	20,687	2,173	545	1,034	−18.1%
10	Orangeville A's	5,858	554	189	293	−14.1%
	League total	366,274	7,852	189	1,831	−7.1%

Notes:
1: New team.

== Playoffs ==
Division Semifinals
A1	Halifax	3
A4	Moncton	0
Atlantic Division
A2	Saint John	2
A3	Island	3
C1	London	3
C4	Orangeville	0
Central Division
C2	Windsor	3
C3	Kitchener-Waterloo	0

Division Finals
A1	Halifax	4
A3	Island	2
C1	London	4
C2	Windsor	0

NBL Canada Finals
A1	Halifax	2
C1	London	4

Bold Series winner
Italic Team with home-court advantage

=== NBL Canada Finals ===
May 26
7:00 pm

Box score

Halifax Hurricanes 97, London Lightning 105
Scoring by quarter: 17–24, 32–27, 32–30, 16–24
Pts: Antoine Mason 30; Rebs: Billy White 15; Asts: Cliff Clinkscales 9	Pts: Garrett Williamson, Joel Friesen 17 each Rebs: Ryan Anderson 10; Asts: Ryan Anderson 9
London leads series 1–0

Budweiser Gardens, London
Attendance: 2,836

May 27
7:00 pm

Box score

Halifax Hurricanes 111, London Lightning 110
Scoring by quarter: 29–24, 18–29, 31–35, 33–22
Pts: Antoine Mason, CJ Washington 27 each Rebs: CJ Washington 12; Asts: Cliff Clinkscales 10	Pts: Royce White 29; Rebs: Royce White 10; Asts: Junior Cadougan, Royce White 6 each
Halifax ties series 1–1

Budweiser Gardens, London
Attendance: 3,285

May 30
7:00 pm

Box score

London Lightning 105, Halifax Hurricanes 92
Scoring by quarter: 25–27, 19–22, 26–30, 35–13
Pts: Ryan Anderson 33; Rebs: Royce White 14; Asts: Ryan Anderson 10	Pts: C.J. Washington 18; Rebs: Billy White 10; Asts: Cliff Clinkscales 11
London leads series 2–1

Scotiabank Centre, Halifax
Attendance: 1,994

June 1
7:00 pm

Box score

London Lightning 85, Halifax Hurricanes 94
Scoring by quarter: 22–15, 13–29, 26–21, 24–29
Pts: Marcus Capers 22; Rebs: Ryan Anderson 11; Asts: Ryan Anderson 6	Pts: Antoine Mason 19; Rebs: Billy White 14; Asts: Cliff Clinkscales 8
Halifax ties series 2–2

Scotiabank Centre, Halifax
Attendance: 2,912

June 3
7:00 pm

Box score

London Lightning 117, Halifax Hurricanes 95
Scoring by quarter: 31–27, 29–27, 25–24, 32–21
Pts: Royce White 28; Rebs: Royce White 11; Asts: Royce White 7	Pts: Antoine Mason 36; Rebs: Anthony Cox 13; Asts: Cliff Clinkscales 8
London leads series 3–2

Scotiabank Centre, Halifax
Attendance: 2,360

June 5
7:00 pm

Box score

Halifax Hurricanes 116, London Lightning 129
Scoring by quarter: 25–36, 26–33, 34–28, 31–32
Pts: Antoine Mason 33; Rebs: Joey Haywood 7 Asts: Cliff Clinkscales 14	Pts: Royce White 34; Rebs: Royce White 15; Asts: Royce White 9
London wins series 4–2

Budweiser Gardens, London
Attendance: 3,281

== Awards ==
=== Player of the Week award ===
For games in week ending	Atlantic Division		Central Division	
For games in week ending	Player	Team	Player	Team
January 1, 2017	Billy White	Halifax Hurricanes	Justin Moss	Orangeville A's
January 8, 2017	Haakim Johnson	Saint John Riptide	Royce White	London Lightning
January 15, 2017	Gabe Freeman	Saint John Riptide	Quinnel Brown	Windsor Express
January 22, 2017	Ta'Quan Zimmerman	Halifax Hurricanes	Marcus Lewis	Niagara River Lions
January 29, 2017	Chad Frazier	Cape Breton Highlanders	Julian Boyd	London Lightning
February 5, 2017	Terry Thomas	Island Storm	Kyle Johnson	London Lightning
February 12, 2017	Anthony Walker	Cape Breton Highlanders	Juan Pattillo	Windsor Express
February 19, 2017	Melvin Johnson III	Moncton Miracles	Doug Herring, Jr.	London Lightning
February 26, 2017	Tyrone Watson	Halifax Hurricanes	Ryan Anderson	London Lightning
March 5, 2017	Antoine Mason	Halifax Hurricanes	Stefan Nastić	Orangeville A's
March 12, 2017	Horace Wormely	Saint John Riptide	Royce White (2)	London Lightning
March 19, 2017	Tydran Beaty	Moncton Miracles	Juan Pattillo (2)	Windsor Express
March 26, 2017	Jahii Carson	Island Storm	Warren Ward	Windsor Express
April 2, 2017	Anthony Anderson	Saint John Riptide	Adam Blazek	KW Titans
April 9, 2017	Gabe Freeman (2)	Saint John Riptide	Flenard Whitfield	KW Titans
April 16, 2017	Al Stewart	Island Storm	Maurice Jones	Windsor Express
April 23, 2017	Anthony Walker (2)	Cape Breton Highlanders	Samuel Muldrow	Niagara River Lions
April 30, 2017	Malik Story	Island Storm	Jameson Tipping	Orangeville A's

=== End-of-season awards ===
- Most Valuable Players: Royce White, London Lightning
- Canadian Player of the Year: Terry Thomas, Island Storm
- Newcomer of the Year: Jahii Carson, Island Storm
- Defensive Player of the Year: Rahlir Hollis-Jefferson, Orangeville A's
- Rookie of the Year: Maurice Jones, Windsor Express
- Sixth Man of the Year: Antoine Mason, Halifax Hurricanes
- Coach of the Year: Kyle Julius, London Lightning
