= Jamie Vanderbeken =

British-Canadian basketball player

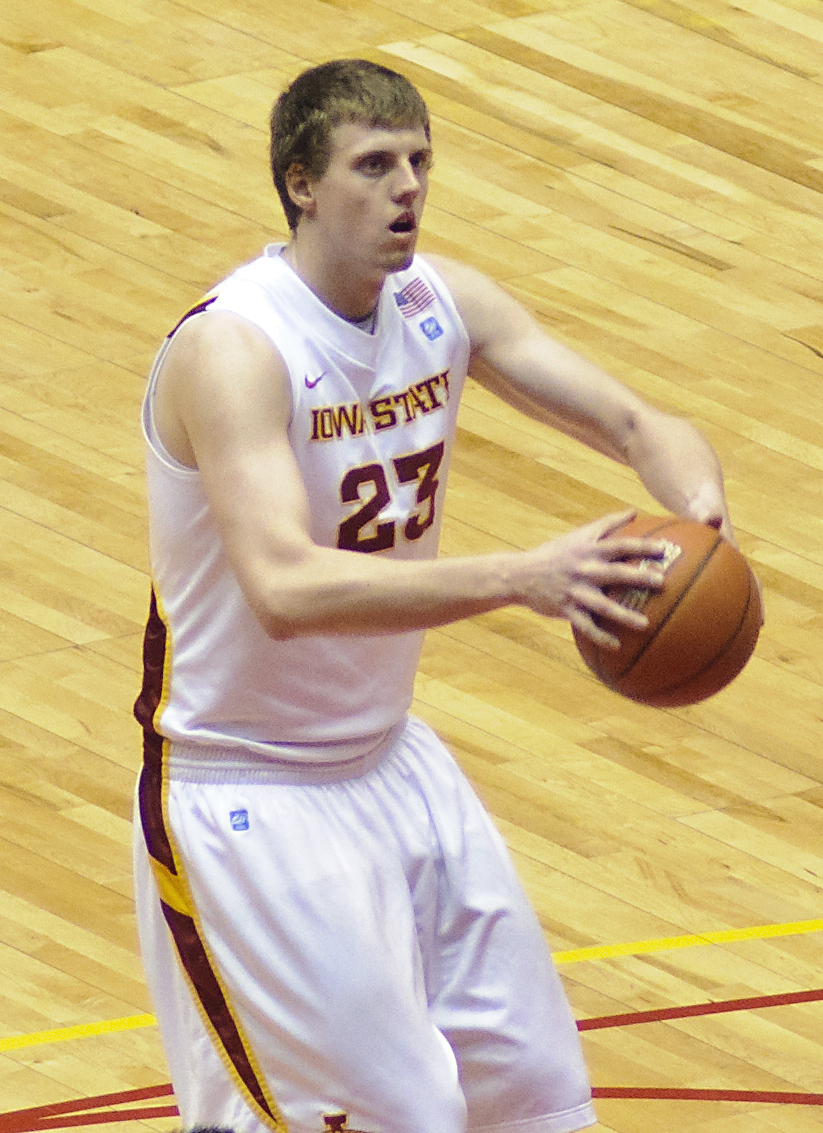
- Vanderbeken with Iowa State in 2011

No. 55 – Saint John Mill Rats
- Position: Power forward
- League: NBL Canada

Personal information
- Born: August 23, 1987 (age 39) Mississauga, Ontario
- Listed height: 6 ft 11 in (2.11 m)
- Listed weight: 240 lb (109 kg)

Career information
- High school: Quinte (Belleville, Ontario)
- College: Tyler JC (2006–2008); Iowa State (2008–2011)
- NBA draft: 2011: undrafted
- Playing career: 2011–present

Career history
- 2011–2012: Bakersfield Jam
- 2012–2013: Glasgow Rocks
- 2013–2014: Ottawa SkyHawks
- 2014–present: Saint John Mill Rats

Career highlights
- NBA D-League All-Rookie Second Team (2012); Big 12 All-Newcomer Team (2009)

Jamie Russell Vanderbeken (born August 23, 1987) is a British-Canadian professional basketball player for the Saint John Riptide of the National Basketball League of Canada (NBL). He played college basketball for Tyler Junior College and Iowa State.

== High school career ==
Vanderbeken attended Quinte Secondary School in Belleville, Ontario. He was considered one of the best high school players of his time in Canada and was ranked 148th nationally by Hoop Masters. He averaged 25.0 points, 12.1 rebounds and 4.2 blocks per game and earned regional honors in his final season with Quinte.

== Collegiate career ==
Vanderbeken initially played college basketball at Tyler Junior College in Tyler, Texas. He helped the team achieve a top 10 national rank and lifted them to their first outright conference title in 21 years as a sophomore. Vanderbeken was also invited to participate in the National Junior College Athletic Association (NJCAA) All-Star Game. He transferred to Iowa State in 2008. With the Cyclones, Vanderbeken quickly became one of the team's top shooters. However, he suffered multiple injuries early in his second season there, forcing him to redshirt his senior season. He returned for his final year, starting all 29 games and averaging 11.1 points, 5.5 rebounds and 1.7 blocks.

== Professional career ==
Vanderbeken has previously played for several teams from around the world, including the Bakersfield Jam, Panionios, Hebraica y Macabi, the Glasgow Rocks, Ottawa Skyhawks, and Saint John Mill Rats.

== International career ==
Vanderbeken was invited to try out for the Great Britain men's national basketball team for a chance to compete at the 2009 FIBA EuroBasket. Due to the fact that his mother was Scottish, he was allowed to hold British-Canadian dual citizenship and therefore represent Great Britain internationally. However, he never would appear after suffering a broken foot on his first day at training camp.
