= Mike Rose (basketball) =

American basketball player

Michael Rose
Personal information
- Born: April 6, 1987 (age 39) Naperville, Illinois, U.S.
- Listed height: 6 ft 4 in (1.93 m)
- Listed weight: 200 lb (91 kg)

Career information
- High school: Neuqua Valley (Naperville, Illinois)
- College: Eastern Kentucky (2005–2009)
- NBA draft: 2009: undrafted
- Playing career: 2009–2021
- Position: Shooting guard

Career history
- 2009: Oyak Renault
- 2010: Melbourne Tigers
- 2010: Southland Sharks
- 2010–2011: Gent Hawks
- 2011: Southland Sharks
- 2012: Sauk Valley Predators
- 2012–2013: Crailsheim Merlins
- 2013: Bulleen Boomers
- 2013–2014: Ottawa SkyHawks
- 2016: Knox Raiders
- 2017–2018: Hume City Broncos
- 2019: Knox Raiders
- 2020–2021: Midwest Storm

Career highlights
- Big V MVP (2016); Big V All-Star Five (2016); 2× First-team All-OVC (2008, 2009); Second-team All-OVC (2007)

Michael Rose (born April 6, 1987) is an American former professional basketball player. He played college basketball for the Eastern Kentucky Colonels before playing professionally in Turkey, Australia, New Zealand, Belgium, Germany and Canada.

== High school career ==
Rose attended Neuqua Valley High School in Naperville, Illinois, where he was rated the 30th-best prospect in the state of Illinois by ChicagoHoops.com. As a senior in 2004–05, he averaged 19.2 points, 7.5 rebounds, 1.8 assists and three steals per game as he led Neuqua Valley to a 24-4 record. He subsequently earned Upstate Eight All-Conference team and Illinois Basketball Coaches Association third team all-state accolades.

== College career ==
As a freshman at Eastern Kentucky in 2005–06, Rose played in all 30 games with 16 starts and was twice named OVC Freshman of the Week in November 2005. He subsequently led all EKU freshmen in points (6.2 ppg), minutes (20.4 mpg), steals (25) and rebounds (2.7 rpg).

As a sophomore in 2006–07, Rose started all 33 games as he earned the OVC Tournament MVP and second-team All-OVC honors. He led the team and ranked sixth in the conference in scoring at 15.1 points per game, while also ranking third in the conference in three-point shooting at 39.8 percent.

As a junior in 2007–08, Rose started all 30 games as he led the team and ranked fifth in the conference in scoring at 15.3 points per game. He also ranked fifth in the conference in free throw shooting (81.5 percent) and fourth in steals (1.8 spg), subsequently earning first-team All-OVC honors. He became the 28th Colonel to reach the 1,000-point plateau when he scored a team-high 21 points against Tennessee Tech on February 2, 2008.

As a senior in 2008–09, Rose earned first-team All-OVC honors for the second straight year after averaging 20.0 points, 5.3 rebounds, 2.5 assists and 1.7 steals in 31 games (all starts). He also earned first-team NABC Division I All-District 19 honors along with Lester Hudson, Drake Reed, Kenneth Faried and Wes Channels.

== Professional career ==
In July 2009, Rose signed with Oyak Renault of the Turkish Basketball League. He left the team after appearing in just one game to start the 2009–10 season.

On January 15, 2010, Rose signed with the Melbourne Tigers in Australia for the rest of the 2009–10 NBL season. In eight games, he averaged 6.9 points, 2.5 rebounds and 1.0 steals per game. Following the NBL season, he had a seven-game stint with the Southland Sharks during the 2010 New Zealand NBL season. He averaged 22.6 points, 6.6 rebounds, 2.1 assists and 2.6 steals per game.

In September 2010, Rose signed with Gent Hawks of the Belgian second division for the 2010–11 season. In 29 games, he averaged 8.5 points and 1.9 rebounds per game.

On June 8, 2011, Rose returned to the Southland Sharks, signing with the club as an injury replacement for Kevin Braswell. In eight games during the 2011 New Zealand NBL season, he averaged 14.6 points, 3.5 rebounds, 1.5 assists and 1.8 steals per game.

On January 30, 2012, Rose signed with the Sauk Valley Predators for the 2012 PBL season. In 17 games, he averaged 15.2 points, 3.5 rebounds, 2.2 assists and 1.6 steals per game.

In October 2012, Rose joined the Crailsheim Merlins of the German second league for the 2012–13 season. In 27 games, he avergaed 9.4 points 2.7 rebounds and 1.5 assists per game.

On February 14, 2013, Rose signed with the Bulleen Boomers in Australia for the 2013 Big V season. In 18 games, he averaged 21.0 points, 5.5 rebounds, 3.3 assists and 2.2 steals per game.

On July 3, 2013, Rose signed with the Ottawa SkyHawks for the 2013–14 NBL Canada season. In 41 games, he averaged 10.1 points, 3.8 rebounds and 1.8 assists per game.

On March 11, 2016, Rose signed with the Knox Raiders for the 2016 Big V season, returning to the team for a second stint. He went on to win the league's Most Valuable Player award. In 22 games, he averaged 22.7 points, 6.1 rebounds, 3.4 assists and 1.9 steals per game.

In December 2016, Rose signed with the Hume City Broncos for the 2017 Big V season. In 21 games, he averaged 20.6 points, 7.8 rebounds, 4.2 assists and 2.0 steals per game. He returned to the Broncos for a second season in 2018, where he averaged 19.8 points, 6.8 rebounds, 4.1 assists and 1.7 steals in 20 games.

In December 2018, Rose signed with the Knox Raiders, now in the NBL1, for the 2019 season. In 20 games, he averaged 14.4 points, 5.2 rebounds, 3.1 assists and 1.1 steals per game.

Rose's final playing stint came during the 2020–21 season with the Midwest Storm of the Maximum Basketball League.
