= NBL Canada All-Star Game =

The NBL Canada All-Star Game was an exhibition game hosted by the National Basketball League of Canada (NBL). The first edition was held in 2012 and included ten players per team, randomly divided under captains Joey Haywood and Eddie Smith. In the final two editions in 2013 and 2014, players were divided into a Central Division team and an Atlantic Division team. In 2014, the players have decided on the coaches' votes. The game takes place alongside multiple other competitions, together known as All-Star Weekend. These competitions include the Three-Point Long Distance Shootout and the Slam Dunk Championship.

== Results ==
Year	Venue	Winning team	Score	Losing team	MVP
2012	Halifax MetroCentre, Halifax, Nova Scotia	Team Haywood	164–155	Team Smith	(United States) Brandon Robinson
2013	Harbour Station, Saint John, New Brunswick	Central	150–145	Atlantic	(United States) Marvin Phillips
2014	Eastlink Centre, Charlottetown, Prince Edward Island	Atlantic	170–165	Central	(United States) Antonio Ballard

== See also ==
- List of NBL Canada All-Stars
