= Port City Power =

Canadian professional basketball team based in Saint John, New Brunswick

- League: The Basketball League; 2025–present
- Founded: 2024
- Location: Saint John, New Brunswick
- Team colours: Royal blue, red, grey, black, white
- Head coach: Rob Spon
- Website: portcitypower.com

The Port City Power are a Canadian professional basketball team based in Saint John, New Brunswick, and a member of The Basketball League (TBL).

== History ==
It was announced that Saint John, New Brunswick, would be awarded a franchise for the upcoming 2025 TBL season. On July 30, 2024, it was named the Port City Power with Rob Spon as head coach and general manager. Rob Spon, the former head coach for the Saint John Riptide of the National Basketball League of Canada, will return as head coach and general manager. It was also announced that the team had signed its first player, Anthony Anderson.

The team folded before its inaugural season in February 2025, citing their inability to afford venue costs. The league announced via instagram that the team would be reinstated for the 2026 season.
