= Tim Parham =

American basketball player (born 1983)

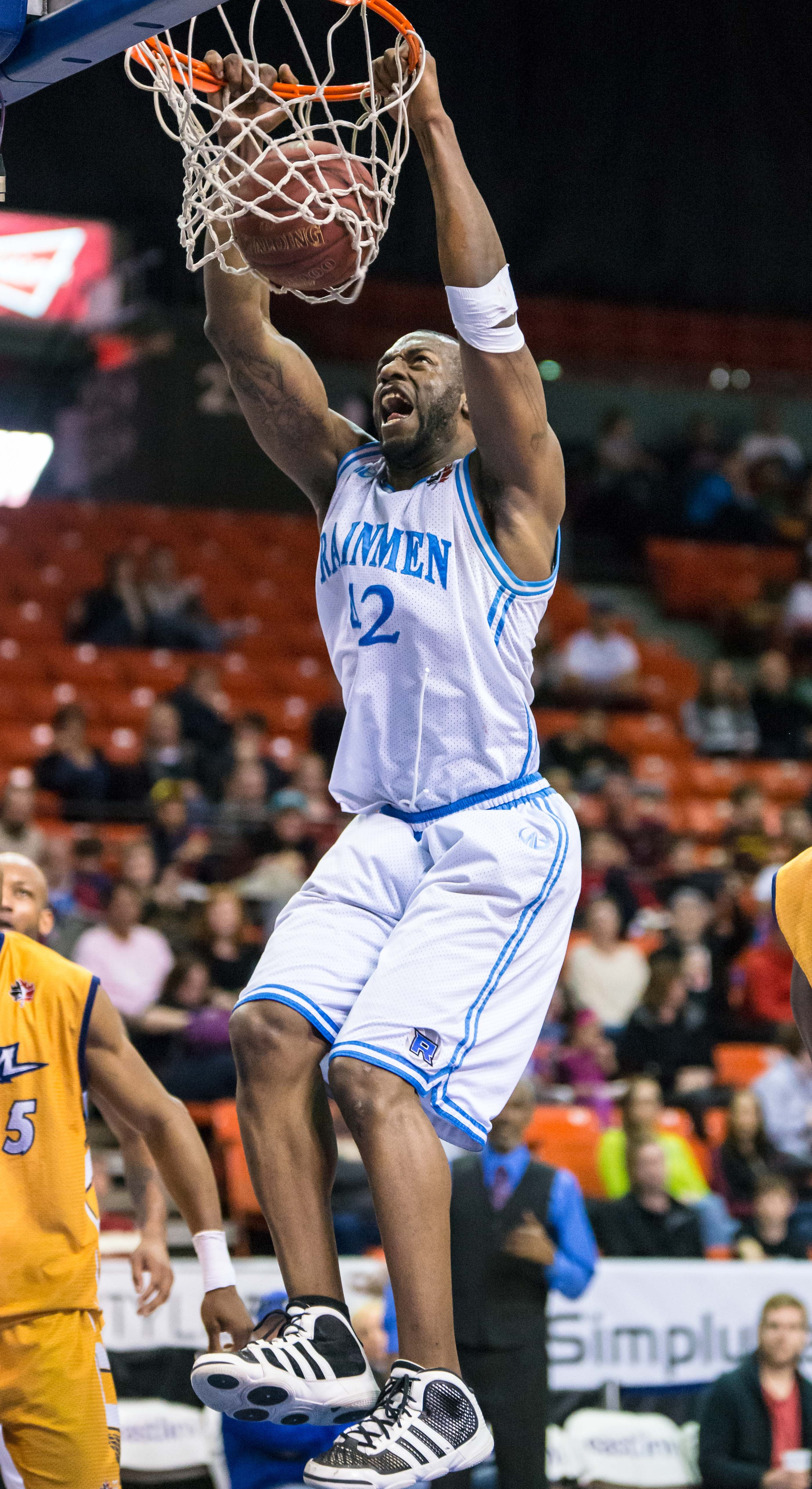
- Parham dunks in 2014

Cóndores de Cundinamarca
- Position: Center
- League: Colombian League

Personal information
- Born: March 18, 1983 (age 43) Chicago, Illinois
- Listed height: 6 ft 9 in (2.06 m)
- Listed weight: 240 lb (109 kg)

Career information
- High school: Hillcrest (Country Club Hills, Illinois)
- College: Ellsworth CC (2002–2003); Maryland Eastern Shore (2003–2006)
- NBA draft: 2006: undrafted
- Playing career: 2006–present

Career history
- 2006: Polpak Świecie
- 2006–2007: Phoenix Hagen
- 2007: Puento Alto C.D.
- 2007: Lobos de la UAC
- 2007: Guerreros de Morelia
- 2008: UBC Uberlândia
- 2008: Regatas Lima
- 2008: Gigantes de Guayana
- 2008–2009: Akçakoca Poyraz
- 2009: Hamamatsu Phoenix
- 2010–2011: Beykozspor
- 2011: Santa Barbara Breakers
- 2012: Kinmen Kaoliang Liquor
- 2013: Atlético Nacional
- 2013–2014: Halifax Rainmen
- 2014–2015: Windsor Express
- 2016: Trotamundos de Carabobo
- 2016: Cóndores de Cundinamarca

Career highlights
- NBL Canada rebounds leader (2014); NBL Canada All-Star (2014); Second-team All-NBL Canada (2014); Second-team All-MEAC (2006)

Ashley Timothy Parham (born March 18, 1983) is an American professional basketball player for Cóndores de Cundinamarca of the Baloncesto Profesional Colombiano. At the college level, he played for Ellsworth Community College and the University of Maryland Eastern Shore. Since going pro, Parham has played with teams in countries such as Canada, Turkey, Japan, Mexico, the United States, and Taiwan.

== Early life and high school ==
Parham grew up on the south side of Chicago, Illinois, an area known for its toughness. He played basketball at the high school level at Hillcrest High School in Country Club Hills, Illinois in a suburban part of the city. Parham did not make the team as a sophomore, but attracted attention from head coach Tom Cappell next year after conditioning and growing three inches in the summer. In the 1999–2000 season, his team, led by future NCAA Division I players Odartey Blankson and Armon Gates, was ranked sixth in the United States. At Hillcrest, with whom he spent his entire high school career, Parham lost only seven games.

== Collegiate career ==
For his freshman year, Parham represented Ellsworth Community College in Iowa Falls, Iowa. The team was ranked sixth-best JUCO team in the nation. Parham helped them defeat the No. 1 team, Southeastern Community College in Iowa. He finished the season averaging 7.1 points and 6.3 rebounds, shooting .540 from the floor.

Parham then attended the University of Maryland Eastern Shore and played college basketball with the Hawks for his final three seasons. As a sophomore, he averaged 6.3 points and 3.3 rebounds, ranking second on the team in field goal percentage, making half of his shot attempts. In his junior season, Parham started in all but one of the Hawks' 28 games. Averaging 11.4 points and a MEAC-high 8.6 rebounds by the end of the year, he led recorded a league-high 9 double-doubles. Following the season, he was an early entrant into the 2005 NBA draft, but withdrew his name before the event. In his senior year, Parham started in all 29 games and averaged 14.0 points and 10.3 rebounds in 32.4 minutes per game, earning all-MEAC honors to cap his collegiate career. He was also named to The Black College All-Star Classic.

== Professional career ==
In 2006, Parham took part in the Pepsi Pro NBA Summer League with the Chicago Bulls. On November 2, he was selected by the Bakersfield Jam with the 11th pick in the 5th round of the 2006 NBA Development League Draft. He also played at the Golden State Warriors Vet camp that same year. In October, he played with Polpak Świecie of the Polish Basketball League (PLK). He recorded 2 points and 9 rebounds in his only appearance with the team. He was not signed due to an injury. In January 2007, Parham signed with Phoenix Hagen of the Basketball Bundesliga in Germany. In 10 games, he averaged 5.8 points and 4.6 rebounds, shooting .448 on two-point field goals. For his next season, he was acquired by Puento Alto C.D. in Chile. After four games, he averaged 7.5 points per game. In September, he moved to Lobos de la UAC, a Saltillo-based team that played in Mexico's Liga Nacional de Baloncesto Profesional (LNBP). He played 27 games with the team and finished his stint there averaging 17.6 points and 10.8 rebounds. Parham ended the season by playing one game for Guerreros de Morelia, however. In January 2008, he signed with UBC Uberlândia of the Novo Basquete Brasil (NBB), but moved to the Peruvian club Regatas Lima after appearing in three contests. A starter, Parham averaged 20.7 points, 5.3 rebounds, 1.7 steals, and 1.3 blocks with his new team. In March, he inked with Gigantes de Guayana of the Liga Profesional de Baloncesto, the top league in Venezuela. He remained in the country but changed leagues when he was signed by Duros de Lara in August 2008. In October, he signed a contract with Akçakoca Poyraz G.S.K. of the Turkish Basketball Second League, for whom he averaged 13.6 points and 10.5 rebounds. In 2009, Parham joined Hamamatsu Higashimikawa Phoenix, and he averaged 18.3 points and 13.1 rebounds. That summer, he competed with Team Athens in the Eurobasket Summer League (ESL) in his hometown of Chicago and was named Best Low Post Player and earned all-league honors. He appeared in the Pre-Vet camp for the NBA's Chicago Bulls and was subsequently picked by the Tulsa 66ers with the first pick in the 8th round of the 2009 NBA D-League draft. 2013-2014 Season was with the Halifax Rainmen in which he averaged 11 pts and 11 rebs per game (Led NBL) Also finished 3rd in blocks and 6th in Scoring. All Time leading rebounder in NBL history with 429 rebounds. Started in the All-Star game, and was named Canada's "Center of the Year". Won a championship with the Windsor Express the very next season. NBA Summer League in 2015 with the Los Angeles Clippers. On February 23, 2018 Parham was inducted into the University of Maryland Eastern Shore's Athletic Hall of Fame, Class of 2018. Tim is now a Developer for top video game NBA 2K as he's worked on 8 games thus far including the newest edition, NBA 2K25
