= Sauk Valley Predators =

- Founded: 2011
- League: Premier Basketball League
- Team history: Sauk Valley Predators (2012-present)
- Based in: Northwestern Illinois
- Arena: Eastland High School, Highland Community College, other sites TBD
- Colors: Green, orange, white
- Owner: Brad & Leah Grenoble
- Coaches: Kevin Keathley, Kirk Engelkens, Ryan Vazquez and Darrick Druce
- Dancers: Sauk Valley RimRockers
- Mascot: Eagle & Owl

The Sauk Valley Predators are a Premier Basketball League team that began play in the 2012 season. Based in Northwestern Illinois, the Predators play their home games at several sites in the region, including Sterling High School in Sterling, Illinois and Highland Community College in Freeport among others. The Predators team included players such as Carlton Fay (Southern Illinois University), Jereme Richmond (University of Illinois), Mike Rose (Eastern Kentucky) and Herman Favors (Georgia State). Head coach Kevin Keathley led the team to a winning season and a playoff appearance. Keathley was assisted by Kirk Engelkens and Ryan Vazquez. Darrick Druce was the strength and conditioning coach.
