= Chris Thomas (basketball coach) =

American basketball coach (born 1980)

Personal information
- Born: November 17, 1980 (age 45)
- Listed height: 6 ft 3 in (1.91 m)

Career information
- High school: Alter (Kettering, Ohio)
- College: Dayton

Career history

Coaching
- 2000–2003: Dayton (asst.)
- 2003–2005: Pitt–Johnstown (asst.)
- 2005–2007: Miami (Ohio) (asst.)
- 2013–2014: Slovenia (asst.)
- 2015–2016: Orangeville A's
- 2016–2018: Westports Malaysia Dragons
- 2018–2019: Zlatorog Laško
- 2019–2020: Bambitious Nara
- 2020: Guaynabo Mets
- 2021–2022: Raptors 905 (assistant)
- 2022–2024: LIU (assistant)
- 2024: Cibona

Chris Thomas (born 1980) is an American professional basketball coach. He served as the head coach at Cibona Zagreb in the ABA League. He has also been the coach of the Guaynabo Mets of the Liga de Baloncesto Superior Nacional (BSN). He was an assistant coach for several college basketball teams, most notably the Miami RedHawks, and the Slovenia national basketball team.

== Early life ==
Thomas was born on November 17, 1980, and grew up in Kettering, Ohio. He attended Archbishop Alter High School in his hometown and led the basketball team to a state title as a senior. Thomas was a member of the varsity team for two seasons.

== Coaching career ==
While he was a student at the University of Dayton in Dayton, Ohio, Thomas worked with the college's basketball team for three years. He helped the coaching staff with player workouts and had roles such running video exchange, maintaining the video library, and writing opponent scouting reports. In 2003, Thomas joined the University of Pittsburgh at Johnstown, where he assumed the position of head assistant coach. While at the school, he was also the recruiting and academic coordinator. He had the additional responsibility of scouting the team's opponents. In August 2015, Thomas became a part of the coaching staff for the RedHawks of Miami University. He assumed the role as administrative assistant and helped the team by overseeing film exchange, film edits, study tables, and travel arrangements. While Thomas was at Miami, the team won the Mid-American Conference tournament and appeared in the 2007 NCAA Men's Division I Basketball Tournament.

After his tenure with Miami, Thomas spent time with the Golden State Warriors, Chicago Bulls, and Utah Jazz, as an NBA advance scout. He worked with the Slovenia national basketball team for two summers as an assistant coach where he worked with NBA Players Goran Dragic, Zoran Dragic, and Boki Nachbar. In September 2015, Thomas joined the Orangeville A's of the National Basketball League of Canada (NBL) as a head coach. In the summer of 2016, Thomas took over the head coaching position of the Luoyan Golden Stars in the NBL of China where he coached former NBA Champion Josh Powell and led them to the NBL Playoffs. In September 2016, Thomas joined the Westports Malaysia Dragons of the ASEAN Basketball League as their new head coach. After resigning from the Westports Malaysia Dragons, Thomas then became the head coach of KK Zlatorog Lasko where he led the team to the best regular season turnaround in wins the Slovenian League for the 18–19 season. During that season, Thomas oversaw Nejc Baric obtain 1st Team All-Slovenian League honors and had Matur Maker, Cleveland "Pancake" Thomas, and Emani Gant win Player of the Week at various points of the season as well. Thomas was named the head coach of Bambitious Nara in the B League of Japan for the 2019–20 season where he led the team to the longest winning streak in the history of the franchise. Thomas is currently the head coach of the Guaynabo Mets in Puerto Rico. During the re-start of the BSN season, Thomas led the Mets to a Semifinals appearance in the playoffs and came within one game of advancing to the finals.

== Head coaching record ==
Legend
Regular season	G	Games coached	W	Games won	L	Games lost	W–L %	Win–loss %
Playoffs	PG	Playoff games	PW	Playoff wins	PL	Playoff losses	PW–L %	Playoff win–loss %

Team	Year	G	W	L	W–L%	Finish	PG	PW	PL	PW–L%	Result
Nara	2019–20	47	18	29	.383	5th in B2 Western	-	-	-	–	-
