= Antonio Ballard =

American basketball player (born 1988)

No. 18 – Free Agent
- Position: Small forward / shooting guard

Personal information
- Born: April 30, 1988 (age 38) Louisville, KY
- Listed height: 6 ft 5 in (1.96 m)
- Listed weight: 222 lb (101 kg)

Career information
- High school: Jeffersonville (Jeffersonville, Indiana)
- College: Miami (Ohio) (2006–2011)
- NBA draft: 2011: undrafted
- Playing career: 2011–present

Career history
- 2012–2014: Summerside / Island Storm
- 2014–2015: Lugano Tigers
- 2015–2016: ESSM Le Portel
- 2016–2017: Lions de Genève
- 2017–2018: Union Neuchâtel
- 2018: Kymis
- 2018–2019: Tadamon Zouk
- 2019: Vilpas Vikings
- 2019–2020: ESSM Le Portel
- 2020–: Kouvot

Career highlights
- 2× NBL Canada All-Star (2013, 2014); NBL Canada All-Star Game MVP (2014); Third-team All-NBL Canada (2013); NBL Canada All-Defence First Team (2013)

Antonio Ballard (born April 30, 1988) is an American professional basketball player, who lastly played for ESSM Le Portel of the LNB Pro A. He played with the Summerside and Island Storm from 2012 to 2014 and was named a National Basketball League of Canada (NBL) All-Star in both seasons. Ballard was also the Most Valuable Player of the 2014 game. He played college basketball at Miami University, where he represented the RedHawks. Michael Stinnett, a coach, commented on him, "He is a versatile small forward who can do a little bit of it all."

== Early life ==
In his childhood, Ballard moved around cities such as Louisville, Kentucky and areas in Indiana. He said that he moved around two to three times each year. Ballard did not know his own father while growing up, and his mother only introduced him when he was nine years old. He told one newspaper, the Dayton Daily News that two of his other brothers, Corey and BJ, went to jail in 2010 after running away from the police with possession of a gun. Ballard's youngest brother, Ricky, had experience in jail as well. In addition, some of his cousins had been shot or killed. Antonio himself had a gun pointed in his face.

The presence of gangs limited the time Ballard could practice basketball. Since many of them were his family members, he was allowed to shoot. He said, "It was rough basketball—kind of like prison ball, I guess. Fights would break out and you had to hold your own, but you couldn't take it too far or something bad would happen." In Jeffersonville, Indiana, there was an old basketball rim, where gangs such as the "Money Hungry Gangsters" would park their cars. Ballard said, "I've taken the good parts of my past life—and one thing you do get from a gang is having each other's back."

Antonio Ballard usually hits his chest with 4 fingers when making a shot which is meant for a special someone.

== High school career ==
Ballard did not play Amateur Athletic Union (AAU) basketball because his family did not have enough money to pay for it. He solely competed at Jeffersonville High School.
