= Garrett Williamson =

Canadian-American basketball player (born 1988)

No. 15 – London Lightning
- Position: Shooting guard / small forward
- League: NBL Canada

Personal information
- Born: June 15, 1988 (age 38) Lower Merion, Pennsylvania
- Listed height: 6 ft 5 in (1.96 m)
- Listed weight: 205 lb (93 kg)

Career information
- High school: Lower Merion (Ardmore, Pennsylvania)
- College: Saint Joseph's (2006–2010)
- NBA draft: 2010: undrafted
- Playing career: 2010–present

Career history
- 2010: Austin Toros
- 2010–2011: Tulsa 66ers
- 2011–2013: Erdgas Ehingen
- 2013–2014: London Lightning
- 2014–2015: AEK Athens
- 2015–present: London Lightning

Career highlights
- NBL Canada Champion (2017, 2018); NBL Canada Playoffs MVP (2018); NBL Canada Canadian of the Year (2014); First-team All-NBL Canada (2014); 2× Atlantic 10 All-Defensive team (2009, 2010)

Garrett Williamson (born June 15, 1988) is a Canadian-American professional basketball player for the London Lightning of the National Basketball League of Canada (NBL). Born in Lower Merion, Pennsylvania, Williamson played high school basketball for Lower Merion and college basketball at Saint Joseph's. While at college he was named twice in the Atlantic 10's all-defensive team. Williamson has played professionally in the NBA Development League, the National Basketball League of Canada, Germany and Greece. In Canada he was named NBL Canada Canadian of the Year in 2014.

== Early life and career ==
Williamson helped Lower Merion High School to win the PIAA state title in 2006. He finished his career at Lower Merion with 1,349 points, at the time second only to Kobe Bryant. At the time of his graduation, Williamson was the school's only player to be named twice in the all-state first team.

== College career ==
Williamson committed to Saint Joseph's, after considering offers from Richmond and Temple. As a freshman, he recorded his first double-double, with 10 points and 10 rebounds, in a win against Boston University. He scored a career-high 20 points in his senior season, as St. Joseph's lost 75–67 to Temple in overtime. He was named in Atlantic 10's all-defensive team in both his junior and senior season.

=== College statistics ===
Legend
| GP | Games played | GS | Games started | MPG | Minutes per game |
| FG% | Field goal percentage | 3P% | 3-point field goal percentage | FT% | Free throw percentage |
| RPG | Rebounds per game | APG | Assists per game | SPG | Steals per game |
| BPG | Blocks per game | PPG | Points per game | **Bold** | Career high |

| Year | Team | GP | GS | MPG | FG% | 3P% | FT% | RPG | APG | SPG | BPG | PPG |
|---|---|---|---|---|---|---|---|---|---|---|---|---|
| 2006–07 | Saint Joseph's | 32 | 31 | 23.8 | .454 | .174 | .676 | 3.6 | 1.9 | 1.0 | .5 | 5.1 |
| 2007–08 | Saint Joseph's | **34** | 4 | 23.3 | **.500** | .167 | .652 | 2.7 | 2.6 | 1.1 | .5 | 5.3 |
| 2008–09 | Saint Joseph's | 32 | **32** | **34.1** | .371 | .250 | .636 | **3.7** | **4.5** | 1.5 | **1.2** | 6.1 |
| 2009–10 | Saint Joseph's | 31 | 31 | 33.8 | .475 | **.273** | **.767** | 3.6 | 3.9 | **1.7** | 1.0 | **12.1** |
| Career | | 129 | 98 | 28.6 | .448 | .227 | .708 | 3.4 | 3.2 | 1.3 | .8 | 7.1 |

== Professional career ==
Following his graduation from college, Williamson signed his first professional contract with the Austin Toros. In October 2011 he signed for Erdgas Ehingen of the German ProA. In December 2012 he signed to play for a second season with Ehingen. Williamson signed for the London Lightning for the 2013–14 season. During that season he was named NBL Canada's player of the week three times. At the end of the season, he was named NBL Canada Canadian of the Year and gained All-NBL Canada first-team honors. In September 2014 Williamson signed with Greek Basket League team AEK. On 18 March 2015 he was released by AEK. In total he appeared in 17 games for AEK averaging 3.2 points and 1 rebound per game. On 9 September 2015, Williamson returned to the London Lightning under new head coach Kyle Julius. Julius said, "Garrett is a core piece to the team. He has proven himself in this league at a high level and I think after his season in Europe, I think he is even better." He joined the team with the strong prospect of being its best defender. In 2018, Williamson was named to the First Team All-NBLC. In the 2018–19 season, Williamson averaged 15.2 points, 4.6 rebounds, and 3.9 assists per game. He was named to the All-Canadian First Team. Williamson averaged 7.5 points, 7.7 rebounds, and 1.5 assists per game during the 2019–20 season, earning All Canadian Second Team honors.

== Personal ==
Williamson holds dual American-Canadian citizenship, since his mother was born in Toronto.
