= Ottawa SkyHawks =

Former basketball team in Ottawa, Canada

- Founded: 2012
- Folded: 2014
- League: National Basketball League of Canada
- Division: Central
- Team history: Ottawa SkyHawks; 2013–2014
- Based in: Ottawa, Ontario
- Arena: Canadian Tire Centre
- Colours: Black, white, orange, silver
- Owner: Bytown Sports and Entertainment (Gus Takkale, Sunny Gill)
- Head coach: Jaren Jackson
- Championships: 0
- Website: OttawaSkyHawks.com

The Ottawa SkyHawks were a Canadian professional basketball team based in Ottawa, Ontario. The SkyHawks played in the Central Division of the National Basketball League of Canada (NBL Canada) during a single season. Financial difficulty resulted in the team receiving a loan from the league in order to finish the 2013–14 season. NBL Canada announced that the SkyHawks would not participate in the 2014–15 season when the team failed to comply with the terms of the loan.

== History ==
Originally unveiled Ottawa TomaHawks logo

On November 13, 2012, National Basketball League of Canada (NBL Canada) announced that an Ottawa expansion team would join the league for the 2013–14 season. At a news conference on November 21, 2012, Gus Takkale, President of Bytown Sports & Entertainment and the person heading up the ownership group, confirmed the franchise would put a team on the court in the fall of 2013.

Following a name-the-team contest, the team unveiled their nickname, the "TomaHawks", a logo, and colours on February 26, 2013. However, just hours after the announcement, social media erupted with people upset over what they felt to be a culturally insensitive nickname. After an outcry, the Ottawa NBL team will no longer be called the TomaHawks. It was announced at an event on April 4, 2013, that the team would be named the Ottawa SkyHawks.

The SkyHawks finished in fourth (of five) place in the Central Division in the 2013–14 season, and failed to make the playoffs after losing a wildcard game against the Mississauga Power. The team struggled to sell tickets and required a loan from the league in order to finish the season. The team had failed to repay any of the loan by July 31, 2014, and NBL Canada's Board of Governors voted 8–0 to remove Bytown Sports & Entertainment from the league for failing to "adhere to league standards as set out in the operating agreement, and deadlines set forth to prepare for the season." The SkyHawks will not play in the 2014–15 season, but NBL Canada affirmed their commitment to have a team in Ottawa again as early as the 2015–16 season but it never happened.

== Home arenas ==
=== Canadian Tire Centre (2013-14) ===
Originally opened in 1996, the Canadian Tire Centre is a multi-purpose arena, located in the western suburb of Kanata, in Ottawa, Ontario. The arena has seating for 19,153 and a capacity of 20,500 including standing room. The arena hosts ice hockey, basketball, music concerts, skating, and other entertainment events. It is home to the Ottawa Sports Hall of Fame, several restaurants, a fitness complex, and several businesses. The SkyHawks shared the arena with the Ottawa Senators of the National Hockey League.

- Occasional games
  - Cégep de l'Outaouais - The SkyHawks played 2 games on the campus of Cégep de l'Outaouais during the 2013-14 NBL season.
  - La Cité collégiale - The SkyHawks played their wildcard game on the campus of La Cité collégiale on March 2, 2014.

== 2013-14 roster ==
Ottawa SkyHawks roster
Players
Coaches

Pos.	No.	Nat.	Name	Ht.	Wt.	Age
G	3	(United States)	Crouch, Jerice	1.83 m (6 ft 0 in)	180 lb (82 kg)
F	4	(United States)	Sturdivant, Fred	2.00 m (6 ft 7 in)	190 lb (86 kg)
F	7	(United States)	Baines, Tirrell	2.00 m (6 ft 7 in)	220 lb (100 kg)
C	12	(Canada)	Vanderbeken, Jamie	2.1 m (6 ft 11 in)	250 lb (110 kg)
G	14	(United States)	Crook, Jamal (injured)	1.91 m (6 ft 3 in)	175 lb (79 kg)
G	15	(United States)	Tubbs, Justin	1.95 m (6 ft 5 in)	203 lb (92 kg)
G	20	(United States)	Rose, Mike	1.93 m (6 ft 4 in)	200 lb (91 kg)
F	22	(Canada)	Kong, Bol	1.98 m (6 ft 6 in)	220 lb (100 kg)
F	32	(Canada)	Kibi, Eric	1.98 m (6 ft 6 in)	229 lb (104 kg)
G	44	(United States)	Anderson, Ryan	1.93 m (6 ft 4 in)	194 lb (88 kg)

Head coach

- (United States) Jaren Jackson

Assistant coach(es)

- (Canada) Jafeth Maseruka
- (Canada) Etienne Jacquet

Legend

- (C) Team captain
- Injured

- Roster

== Season-by-season record ==
Season	Coach	Regular Season				Post Season			
Season	Coach	Won	Lost	Win %	Finish	Won	Lost	Win %	Result
2013-14	Kevin Keathley	4	3	.571					
2013-14	Jaren Jackson	17	16	.515		0	1	.000	
2013-14	Combined	21	19	.525	6th	0	1	.000	Wild-card round
Totals		21	19	.525		0	1	.000	

== See also ==
- Ottawa Blackjacks, due to begin play in 2020 in the Canadian Elite Basketball League.
