= Ryan Anderson (basketball, born 1987) =

American basketball player

Personal information
- Born: December 19, 1987 (age 38)
- Listed height: 6 ft 4 in (1.93 m)
- Listed weight: 205 lb (93 kg)

Career information
- High school: Rainier Beach (Seattle, Washington)
- College: Nebraska (2006–2010)
- NBA draft: 2010: undrafted
- Playing career: 2010–2020
- Position: Shooting guard

Career history
- 2010: ZZ LeidenCrailsheim Merlins
- 2011: Sioux Falls Skyforce
- 2013: Bloomington Flex
- 2013–2014: Ottawa SkyHawks
- 2014: Rochester Razorsharks
- 2014–2015: Windsor Express
- 2015–2018: London Lightning
- 2018–2019: Windsor Express
- 2019–2020: Niagara River Lions

Career highlights
- 3x NBL Canada Champion (2015, 2017, 2018); NBL Canada Finals MVP (2017); First-team All-NBL Canada (2017); Second-team All-NBL Canada (2014); 2x PBL Champion (2013, 2014); CEBL Community Ambassador Award Recipient (2019); NBL Canada 3-Point Shootout champion (2014); First-team All-PBL (2013); Big 12 All-Defensive Team (2009)

Ryan Christian Anderson (born December 19, 1987) is an American former professional basketball player who last played for the Niagara River Lions of the Canadian Elite Basketball League (CEBL). He was a four-year standout player for Nebraska, where he earned a degree in sociology with a minor in music technology.

== High school career ==
Anderson attended Rainier Beach High School in Seattle, Washington. When Anderson was a freshman, his team was ranked No. 1 in the state and the country, with the help of Stewart Twins and Nate Robinson, they won the state title. In Anderson's sophomore year, Rainier Beach finished as the state's runners-up and as a junior, he gathered all-conference and all-city accolades. In his final high school season, he averaged 19 points, 9 rebounds, and 7 assists, leading his team to a fourth-place finish at states with a 23–7 record. Anderson also played Amateur Athletic Union (AAU) basketball for the Friends of Hoop in the summer of 2005 with Isaiah Thomas of the Boston Celtics and Spencer Hawes, averaging 12 points, 4 rebounds, and 3 assists. The team reached the semifinals of the Nike Peach Jam and, later in the summer, won the title of the Nike Main Event in Vegas. The win gave them a ticket to participate in the Prep Showcase championship, at which Anderson defeated future NBA MVP Kevin Durant to win the Three-Point Contest.

Ryan is the son of Carla and Paul Anderson and has four sisters—Taylor, Erin, Deborah, and Kela—and one brother, Austin. He is the father of two children, Jalen and Aniyah.

In his spare time, Ryan is a musician who sings, writes, produces. He plays six musical instruments: drums, bass guitar, guitar, saxophone, piano, and keyboards. He has completed multiple albums, independently writing and composing each.

Ryan is also the CEO of his independent record label, VeryTrue Records, where he is signed as a recording artist. He is dedicated to growing the label and is focused on advancing his music career.
