= 2013–14 NBL Canada season =

- League: National Basketball League of Canada
- Sport: Basketball
- Duration: November 2013 – March 2014 (regular season)
- Teams: 9
- Total attendance: 269,345 (1,947 per game)

Draft
- Top draft pick: Alex Johnson (NC State)
- Picked by: Ottawa SkyHawks

Playoffs
- Atlantic champions: Island Storm
- Atlantic runners-up: Halifax Rainmen
- Central champions: Windsor Express
- Central runners-up: London Lightning

Finals
- Champions: Windsor Express
- Runners-up: Island Storm
- Finals MVP: Stefan Bonneau (Windsor Express)

NBL Canada seasons
- ← 2012–13 2014–15 →

The 2013–14 NBL Canada season was the third season of the National Basketball League of Canada. The regular season began on November 1, 2013. The regular season ended on Friday, February 28, 2014, and the playoffs began on Sunday, March 2, 2014 and ended on Thursday, April 17, 2014 with the Windsor Express defeating the Island Storm in seven games to win the 2014 NBLC Finals.

== Offseason ==
Coaching changes
Offseason
Team	2012–13 season	2013–14 season
Halifax Rainmen	Rob Spon	Chris Terrell
Mississauga Power	Larry Blunt	Fred Grannum
Saint John Mill Rats	David Cooper	Rob Spon
In-season
Team	Outgoing coach	Incoming coach
Halifax Rainmen	Chris Terrell	Craig Hodges
Mississauga Power	Fred Grannum	David Joseph
Ottawa SkyHawks	Kevin Keathley	Jaren Jackson

Following the conclusion of the 2012-13 NBL Canada season, the Oshawa Power relocated to Mississauga, Ontario, and were renamed the Mississauga Power. The 2013–14 NBL Canada season also featured expansion to two new locations: Ottawa, and Brampton. During preseason, another team announced its relocation, the Summerside Storm moving to Charlottetown, PEI. It was announced that the Storm name would be retained. In early August, the league's board of governors announced the Jazz would sit out the season due to failure of securing new ownership from the league.

=== Coaching changes ===
==== Offseason ====
On August 6, 2013, the Halifax Rainmen hired Chris Terrell as head coach.

On August 12, 2013, the St. John Mill Rats hired Rob Spon as head coach.

On August 16, 2013, the Mississauga Power hired Fred Grannum as head coach.

=== Draft ===
The 2013 NBL Canada draft took place on August 19 at the Hilton Suites Conference Centre & Spa in Markham, Ontario. The Ottawa SkyHawks made league history by drafting Alex Johnson of NC State, the first Canadian to ever be drafted with the first pick in the NBLC draft.

== Teams ==
2013-14 National Basketball League of Canada
Division	Team	City	Arena	Capacity
Atlantic	Halifax Rainmen	Halifax, Nova Scotia	Halifax Metro Centre	10,500
Atlantic	Island Storm	Charlottetown, Prince Edward Island	Eastlink Centre	4,000
Atlantic	Moncton Miracles	Moncton, New Brunswick	Moncton Coliseum	6,554
Atlantic	Saint John Mill Rats	Saint John, New Brunswick	Harbour Station	6,603
Central	Brampton A's	Brampton, Ontario	Powerade Centre	5,000
Central	London Lightning	London, Ontario	Budweiser Gardens	9,000
Central	Mississauga Power	Mississauga, Ontario	Hershey Centre	5,400
Central	Ottawa SkyHawks	Ottawa, Ontario	Canadian Tire Centre	19,153
Central	Windsor Express	Windsor, Ontario	WFCU Centre	6,500

=== Map of teams ===
Atlantic Division Central Division

== Regular season ==
The regular season began on November 1, 2013, and concluded on February 28, 2014. The number of games played by each team remains 40, similar to the prior season.

=== Standings ===
#	Atlantic Division						
#	Team	W	L	PCT	GB	Div	GP
1	y-Saint John Mill Rats	23	17	.575	--	19-11	40
2	x-Island Storm	22	18	.550	1.0	19-11	40
3	x-Moncton Miracles	14	26	.350	9.0	13-17	40
4	x-Halifax Rainmen	11	29	.275	12.0	9-21	40

#	Central Division						
#	Team	W	L	PCT	GB	Div	GP
1	y-Windsor Express	29	11	.718	--	22- 9	40
2	x-Brampton A's	27	13	.667	2.0	18-13	40
3	x-London Lightning	23	17	.590	5.0	17-14	40
4	Ottawa SkyHawks	21	19	.539	7.0	16-15	40
5	x-Mississauga Power	10	30	.250	18.5	5-27	40

== Statistics leaders ==
=== Individual statistic leaders ===
Category	Player	Team	Statistics
Points per game	Anthony Anderson	Saint John Mill Rats	24.3
Rebounds per game	Tim Parham	Halifax Rainmen	10.5
Assists per game	Darren Duncan	Windsor Express	8.8
Steals per game	Jujuan Cooley	Halifax Rainmen	2.8
Blocks per game	Cavell Johnson	Brampton A's	1.7
Turnovers per game	Trayvon Lathan	Moncton Miracles	3.8
FG%	Eric Crookshank	Saint John Mill Rats	61.9%
FT%	Stefan Bonneau	Windsor Express	88.6%
3PT%	Jamie Vanderbeken	Ottawa SkyHawks	48.7%
Double-doubles	Antonio Ballard	Island Storm	20
Triple-doubles	Trayvon Lathan	Moncton Miracles	3

=== Individual game highs ===
Category	Player	Statistics
Points	Nick Okorie	41
Rebounds	Tim Parham	22
Assists	Stefan Bonneau	17
Steals	Jujuan Cooley	7
Three Pointers	Adrian Moss	7
Three Pointers	Greg Plummer	7
Three Pointers	Ryan Anderson	7
Three Pointers	Johnny Mayhane	7
Three Pointers	Anthony Anderson	7
Blocks	Elvin Mims	7

=== Team statistic leaders ===
Category	Team	Statistics
Points per game	Brampton A's	106.0
Rebounds per game	Moncton Miracles	52.6
Assists per game	Mississauga Power	23.0
Steals per game	Island Storm	9.8
Blocks per game	London Lightning	4.7
Turnovers per game	London Lightning	15.7
Fouls per game	Mississauga Power	24.2
FG%	Saint John Mill Rats	45.7%
FT%	Saint John Mill Rats	76.8%
3FG%	Saint John Mill Rats	37.4%
+/-	Windsor Express	5.3

== Awards ==
=== Players of the week ===
The following players were named the NBL Canada Players of the Week.

Week	Player of the Week	Ref.
Nov. 1 – Nov. 3	Stefan Bonneau (Windsor Express) (1/2)	
Nov. 4 – Nov. 10	Stanley Robinson (Moncton Miracles) (1/1)	
Nov. 11 – Nov. 17	Doug Herring (Saint John Mill Rats) (1/1)	
Nov. 18 – Nov. 24	Cavell Johnson (Brampton A's) (1/2)	
Nov. 25 – Dec. 1	Elvin Mims (London Lightning) (1/1)	
Dec. 2 – Dec. 8	Antonio Ballard (Island Storm) (1/2)	
Dec. 9 – Dec. 15	Tim Parham (Halifax Rainmen) (1/1)	
Dec. 16 – Dec. 22	Garrett Williamson (London Lightning) (1/3)	
Dec. 23 – Dec. 29	Ryan Anderson (Ottawa SkyHawks) (1/1)	
Dec. 30 – Jan. 5	Johnny Mayhane (Moncton Miracles) (1/1)	
Jan. 6 – Jan. 12	Garrett Williamson (London Lightning) (2/3)	
Jan. 13 – Jan. 19	Anthony Anderson (Saint John Mill Rats) (1/1)	
Jan. 20 – Jan. 26	Antonio Ballard (Island Storm) (2/2)	
Jan. 27 – Feb. 2	Morgan Lewis (Mississauga Power) (1/1)	
Feb. 3 – Feb. 9	Stefan Bonneau (Windsor Express) (2/2)	
Feb. 10 – Feb. 16	Justin Tubbs (Ottawa SkyHawks) (1/1)	
Feb. 17 – Feb. 23	Garrett Williamson (London Lightning) (3/3)	
Feb. 24 – Feb. 28	Cavell Johnson (Brampton A's) (2/2)	

=== Coach of the month ===
The following coaches were named the NBL Canada Coaches of the Month.

Month	Coach of the Month	Ref.
November	David Magley (Brampton A's) (1/1)	
December	Bill Jones (Windsor Express) (1/1)	
January	Rob Spon (Saint John Mill Rats) (1/1)	
February	Jaren Jackson (Ottawa SkyHawks) (1/1)	

== Playoffs ==
The NBL Canada Championship Playoffs format has changed after the 2013 expansion. Initially, the first 4 teams out of 5 in each division would qualify. After the Jazz withdrawal from the season, this posed the problem of having all 4 teams in the Atlantic Division be already qualified. Although nothing has been announced officially by the league, some newspapers wrote that indeed all 4 teams in Atlantic will qualify, as well as the first 3 teams in Central. Teams 4 and 5 in the Central Division will play a wild card game for playoff access.

Division Semifinals
1	Saint John*	1
4	Halifax	3
Atlantic Division
2	Island	3
3	Moncton	1
1	Windsor*	3
5	Mississauga	0
Central Division
2	Brampton	2
3	London	3

Division Finals
4	Halifax	2
2	Island	4
1	Windsor	4
3	London	3

NBL Canada Finals
2	Island	3
1	Windsor	4

* Division winner
Bold Series winner

=== Wild card series ===
(4) Ottawa SkyHawks vs. (5) Mississauga Power

March 2
2:00 pm

Report 1 Report 2

Ottawa SkyHawks 100, Mississauga Power 103
Scoring by quarter: 33–29, 16–30, 36–26, 15–18
Pts: Ryan Anderson 23; Rebs: Ryan Anderson, Mike Rose 12 each Asts: Ryan Anderson 6	Pts: Morgan Lewis 21; Rebs: Morgan Lewis 10; Asts: Morgan Lewis 5

La Cité Collégiale, Ottawa, Ontario
Attendance: 430

=== NBL Canada Finals ===
April 4

Box score

Island Storm 100, Windsor Express 122
Scoring by quarter: 23–27, 23–32, 27–26, 27–37
Pts: Nick Okorie 17; Rebs: Antonio Ballard 10; Asts: Adrian Moss 10	Pts: Darren Duncan 26; Rebs: Chris Commons 10; Asts: Darren Duncan 11
Windsor leads series, 1–0

WFCU Centre, Windsor, Ontario
Attendance: 1925

April 6

Box score

Island Storm 104, Windsor Express 102
Scoring by quarter: 16–34, 31–21, 33–20, 24–27
Pts: Nick Okorie 31; Rebs: Antonio Ballard 10; Asts: Adrian Moss, Nick Okorie 6	Pts: Stefan Bonneau, Julius Brooks 34; Rebs: DeAndre Thomas 9 Asts: Stefan Bonneau, Julius Brooks 8
Island ties series, 1–1

WFCU Centre, Windsor, Ontario
Attendance: 1535

April 9

Box score

Windsor Express 104, Island Storm 129
Scoring by quarter: 33–32, 15–36, 32–29, 24–32
Pts: DeAndre Thomas 26; Rebs: Chris Commons 13; Asts: Darren Duncan 11	Pts: Antonio Ballard 35; Rebs: Antonio Ballard, Jeremy Williams 13; Asts: Al Stewart 10
Island leads series, 2–1

Eastlink Centre, Charlottetown
Attendance: 1940

April 11

Box score

Windsor Express 103, Island Storm 104
Scoring by quarter: 26–22, 18–23, 27–27, 32–32
Pts: Stefan Bonneau, Julius Brooks 34; Rebs: Quinnel Brown 9 Asts: Darren Duncan 7	Pts: Nick Okorie 31; Rebs: Antonio Ballard, Jeremy Williams 8 Asts: Nick Okorie 8
Island leads series, 3–1

Eastlink Centre, Charlottetown
Attendance: 2220

April 12

Box score

Windsor Express 113, Island Storm 111
Scoring by quarter: 24–20, 33–25, 28–21, 28–45
Pts: Stefan Bonneau, Julius Brooks 39; Rebs: Quinnel Brown 12; Asts: Darren Duncan 6	Pts: Nick Okorie 31; Rebs: Antonio Ballard, Jeremy Williams, Dwayne Smith, Steve Tchiengang 8 Asts: Nick Okorie, Jeremy Williams 4
Island leads series, 3–2

Eastlink Centre, Charlottetown
Attendance: 3002

April 15

Box score

Island Storm 88, Windsor Express 107
Scoring by quarter: 15–22, 17–26, 20–28, 36–31
Pts: Nick Okorie 23; Rebs: Antonio Ballard 9 Asts: Adrian Moss, Al Stewart 4	Pts: Chris Commons 19; Rebs: Stefan Bonneau, Julius Brooks 9 Asts: Darren Duncan 12
Windsor ties series, 3–3

WFCU Centre, Windsor, Ontario
Attendance: 2109

April 15

Box score

Island Storm 106, Windsor Express 121
Scoring by quarter: 24–32, 17–32, 22–30, 43–27
Pts: Nick Okorie 30; Rebs: Antonio Ballard, Dwayne Smith 9 Asts: Nick Okorie 8	Pts: Stefan Bonneau, Julius Brooks 32; Rebs: Darren Duncan, DeAndre Thomas 11; Asts: Darren Duncan 16
Windsor wins series, 4–3

WFCU Centre, Windsor, Ontario
Attendance: 3470

== Notable occurrences ==
- After being unable to find new ownership, the NBLC announced the Montreal Jazz would sit out the 2013–14 season.
- The Oshawa Power officially moved to Mississauga and were renamed the Mississauga Power.
- The Summerside Storm officially moved to Charlottetown and were renamed the Island Storm.
- The NBLC officially announced that expansion for the 2014–15 season will be open to ownership groups from Canada's Western Provinces.
- The NBLC officially named Paul Riley as league commissioner.
- After a disappointing 2–4 start to the 2013–14 season, the Mississauga Power released head coach Fred Grannum. The Power promoted long time assistant coach David Joseph to head coach.
- The November 21 game between the Halifax Rainmen and the Moncton Miracles was canceled at halftime due to a citywide power outage in Moncton. The second half of the game will be finished on January 2.
- The November 24 game between the Ottawa SkyHawks and the London Lightning was canceled due to inclement weather in London. The game is rescheduled for January 22.
- The Ottawa SkyHawks relieved head coach Kevin Keathley of his duties on November 25 after a 4–3 start to the season. Jaren Jackson, a former NBA champion with the San Antonio Spurs, was named as the new head coach.
- The Halifax Rainmen relieved Chris Terrell of his head coaching duties on November 26 after a disappointing 0–6 start to the season. The Rainmen named former NBA star Craig Hodges as interim head coach.
- The December 10 game between the Island Storm and the Moncton Miracles was canceled due to inclement weather. The game was rescheduled to February 15.
- The December 15 games between the Island Storm against the Windsor Express, and the Saint John Mill Rats against the Moncton Miracles were postponed due to inclement weather. The Storm/Express game was played on December 16, while the Mill Rats/Miracles game is rescheduled for February 26.
- The December 21 game between the Brampton A's and the Halifax Rainmen was postponed due to inclement weather. The game was played on December 23.
- The December 23rd game between the Brampton A's and the London Lightning was rescheduled to allow the Halifax Rainmen play in their place, the game to London Lightning was rescheduled to Feb 2014.
- The December 22 game between the Saint John Mill Rats and the Moncton Miracles was postponed due to inclement weather. The game will be rescheduled to a future date in February.
- The January 15 regular season game between the Windsor Express and their Central Division rivals London Lightning was held at the Coliseum on the grounds of the Caesars Windsor, dubbed the "Clash at the Coliseum". The Express won the game 86–78.
- The January 25 game between the Windsor Express and the Brampton A's was postponed due to inclement weather. The game will be rescheduled to a future date.
- In an effort to expand their fanbase, the Ottawa SkyHawks played their January 27 game with the London Lightning on the campus of Cégep de l'Outaouais, the biggest public college in the Outaouais region of Quebec, Canada. The SkyHawks played a second game their against the Windsor Express on February 24.
- The January 29 game between the Moncton Miracles and the Halifax Rainmen was postponed due to inclement weather. The game will be rescheduled to a future date.
- The January 31 games between the Windsor Express versus the Brampton A's and the Halifax Rainmen versus the Moncton Miracles were postponed due to inclement weather. The Rainmen/Miracles game is rescheduled for February 24 and the Express/A's game is rescheduled for February 25.
- The Windsor Express set a new NBL Canada league record of 12 straight wins with their February 15 win against the Brampton A's.
- The February 16 game between the Halifax Rainmen and the Island Storm was postponed due to inclement weather. The game is rescheduled for February 26.
