= Orangeville A's =

Former basketball team in Orangeville, Canada

- Division: Central Division
- League: NBL Canada
- Founded: 2013
- History: Brampton A's; 2013–2015; Orangeville A's; 2015–2017
- Arena: Athlete Institute
- Location: Orangeville, Ontario
- Team colours: Red and black
- Head coach: Brandon Lesovsky
- Ownership: James Tipping
- Website: AsBasketball.ca

The Orangeville A's were a Canadian professional basketball franchise based in Orangeville, Ontario. Founded in 2012 in Brampton, the A's were a member of the National Basketball League of Canada, where they began play for the 2013–14 season.

== History ==
On April 2, 2013, it was announced that an ownership group had stepped forward to put an NBL Canada team in Brampton for the 2013–14. The Brampton A's colour scheme would be red and black.

On September 15, 2015, the A's decided to relocate to Orangeville, Ontario.

After the 2016–17 season the A's folded.

== Home arenas ==
Originally opened in 1998, the Powerade Centre is a 5,000-seat multi-purpose arena in Brampton, Ontario. The main arena has a capacity of 5,000. The A's share the arena with the Brampton Beast of the ECHL. It is also home to the Brampton Inferno, Peel Avengers, and Brampton Excelsiors lacrosse teams.

On September 15, 2015, the A's announced that they would be relocating to Orangeville and begin playing at the Athlete Institute in Mono, Ontario. The team declined the option to remain at the Powerade Centre for five more years. The A's would not have to pay rental fees for modifying the court, as they were forced to do in their old arena. Team owner James Tipping said, "I had to do what was best for the team and NBL Canada. I chose to do what best for the franchise and NBL Canada."

== Final roster ==
Note: Flags indicate national team eligibility at FIBA-sanctioned events. Players may hold other non-FIBA nationalities not displayed.

Orangeville A's roster
Players
Coaches

Pos.	No.	Nat.	Name	Ht.	Wt.	Age
G	2	(United States)	Bodiford, Rick	6 ft 5 in (1.96 m)	205 lb (93 kg)	38 – 14 January 1987
PG	3	(United States)	Harris, Anthony	6 ft 2 in (1.88 m)	186 lb (84 kg)	40 – 3 February 1985
G	4	(Canada)	Tipping, Jameson	6 ft 7 in (2.01 m)	215 lb (98 kg)
G	5	(United States)	Hendricks, Scotty	5 ft 10 in (1.78 m)	185 lb (84 kg)
G	10	(Canada)	DiLoreto, Rico	6 ft 1 in (1.85 m)	185 lb (84 kg)	35 – 11 August 1990
G	12	(Canada)	Anderson, Jake	6 ft 2 in (1.88 m)	201 lb (91 kg)	38 – 8 April 1987
G	15	(Canada)	Joseph, Troy	6 ft 6 in (1.98 m)	205 lb (93 kg)	34 – 20 May 1991
PF	20	(United States)	Moss, Justin	6 ft 8 in (2.03 m)	245 lb (111 kg)	32 – 19 June 1993
F	21	(Canada)	Tulloch, Daniel	6 ft 6 in (1.98 m)	235 lb (107 kg)
G/F	24	(United States)	Hollis-Jefferson, Rahlir	6 ft 6 in (1.98 m)	210 lb (95 kg)	34 – 26 June 1991
C	31	(United States)	Magee, Slim	6 ft 11 in (2.11 m)	210 lb (95 kg)
F	34	(United States)	Thurman, Gavin	6 ft 7 in (2.01 m)	214 lb (97 kg)	31 – 6 July 1994

Head coach

- (United States) Brandon Lesovsky

Assistant coach(es)

- (Canada) Sheldon Cassimy
- (Canada) Jacki Tipping
- (Canada) Clinton Cybulski

Legend

- (C) Team captain
- Injured

- Roster
- Transactions
Updated: March 7, 2016

== Season-by-season record ==
Season	Coach	Regular Season				Postseason			
Season	Coach	Won	Lost	Win %	Finish	Won	Lost	Win %	Result
2013–14	Dave Magley	27	13	.675	2nd	2	3	.400	Division Semifinals
2014–15	Dave Magley	18	14	.563	2nd	6	6	.500	Division Finals
2015–16	Chris Thomas	14	26	.350	4th	0	3	.000	Division Semifinals
2016–17	Brandon Lesovsky	16	24	.400	4th	0	3	.000	Division Semifinals
Totals		72	74	.493		8	15	.348	
