= National Basketball League of Canada =

Canadian professional basketball league

National Basketball League of Canada Ligue nationale de basketball du Canada
- Sport: Basketball
- Founded: 2011
- First season: 2011–12
- Folded: 2023
- CEO: Gary Curgin
- No. of teams: 4
- Country: Canada
- Confederation: FIBA Americas
- Last champions: London Lightning (6th title) (2023)
- Most titles: London Lightning (6 titles)
- Broadcaster: NBLC TV
- Website: nblcanada.ca

The National Basketball League of Canada (NBL Canada; French: Ligue nationale de basketball du Canada) was a Canadian professional men's minor league basketball organization. The NBL Canada was founded in 2011, when three existing Premier Basketball League teams joined with four new franchises for the league's inaugural season. The league changed in size multiple times and had four active teams in its final season, all in Ontario, but historically the NBLC had several located in the Atlantic provinces. The league's season typically ran from November to April of the following year. The final league champions were the London Lightning, who defeated the Windsor Express 3–2 in the 2023 NBL Finals.

Following the conclusion of the 2023 NBLC season the four remaining NBLC teams, the KW Titans, London Lightning, Sudbury Five and Windsor Express, broke away from the NBLC and helped found the Basketball Super League along with president of The Basketball League, David Magley.

== History ==
=== Establishment ===
In mid-2011, discussion began of a domestic basketball minor league in Canada. Three franchises from the Premier Basketball League (PBL), the Halifax Rainmen, Quebec Kebs, and Saint John Mill Rats were the first to join the National Basketball League of Canada (NBL). The teams had been unhappy with the officiating in the PBL. On May 12 of that year in Halifax, Nova Scotia, league CEO Andre Levingston held a press conference regarding the creation of the NBL Canada. By the end of the summer, the London Lightning, Moncton Miracles, Oshawa Power, and Summerside Storm were established and had announced that they would join the league. There had also been unsuccessful attempts to start up teams in Fredericton, New Brunswick, and Kingston, Ontario.

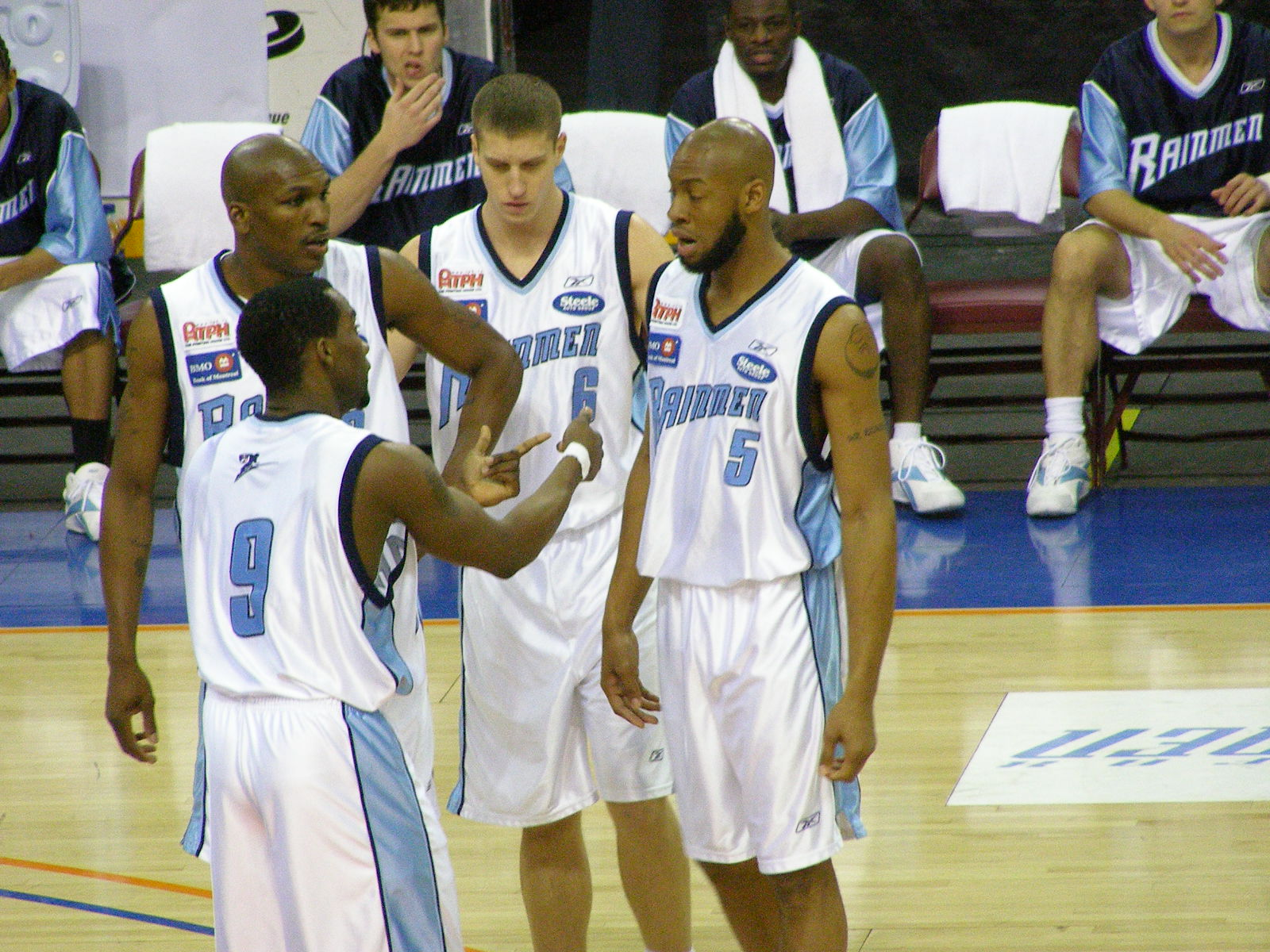
The Halifax Rainmen (pictured in 2008) chose to partake in the NBL Canada due to the poor quality of the PBL.

John Kennedy, a native of Windsor and a sports executive based in Los Angeles, was named the first commissioner of the NBL. He previously had experience working with the Los Angeles Lakers and Los Angeles Clippers of the National Basketball Association (NBA). League president Andre Levingston spoke on his expectations of the commissioner, saying, "We wanted to make sure we had a person who was going to be committed and was willing to roll up his sleeves and work very hard, someone who understood business, had business relationship and a person who was going to govern the league the right way."

In June 2011, the league finalized rules for its first season. There would be seven teams, four of which qualified for the playoffs, and no divisions. It would follow FIBA rules and each team would play 36 games in the regular season. Team rosters could contain 10–12 players, at least two of them Canadian, and they had a salary cap of $150,000 Canadian. Players could earn potentially $70,000 in one season, and each game would draw an average of 3,000 fans, varying by location. Levingston envisioned the NBL Canada as a more stable alternative to other North American minor basketball leagues with players living close to home while playing professionally.

=== First seasons (2011–2013) ===
The NBL Canada held its first draft on August 21, 2011, at Rogers Centre. The Power selected Morgan Lewis of the University of Findlay with the first overall pick. Jerome Brown, who was picked fifth overall by the Mill Rats, was the first Canadian to be taken in the draft. The event was viewed by more than 6,000 people online from 93 countries. 180 players from across the world attended the preceding NBL Canada combine.

The first player to be signed into the NBL Canada was Canadian Yannick Anzuluni, who joined the Kebs on a three-year contract on August 17, 2011. On October 29, in the first game of the NBL Canada's inaugural 2011–12 NBL Canada season, the Kebs defeated the Miracles at the Colisée de Laval. Within a week, every team in the league had played at least one game. The NBL Canada's opening season brought in marquee players such as Gabe Freeman, Anthony Anderson, and Lawrence Wright. Amid the 2011 NBA lockout, six players with past experience in the National Basketball Association (NBA), including Eddie Robinson and Rodney Buford, joined the NBL Canada.

Progression of expansion
Season	No. of teams
2011–12	7
2012–13	8
2013–14	9
2014–15	8
2015–16	8
2016–17	10
2017–18	10
2018–19	10
2019–20	8
2020–21	N/A
2022	4
2023	4

The London Lightning, coached by Micheal Ray Richardson, soon emerged as the top team in the league, going 28–8 by end of the regular season, which lasted until March 4, 2012. The team defeated the Halifax Rainmen, 3–2, in the best-of-five NBL Canada Finals series to claim the championship. They drew a league-high 5,106 fans to the John Labatt Centre for the game. Following the NBL Canada's inaugural year, Canadian sports analyst Alex Walling claimed it was a success, commenting, "The NBL could hold its head up high. It has been a great season and they've gained a great deal of creditability. They've earned the kudos." Levingston touted the league because it "played a full schedule on every set date and never had a problem." Shortly after the season, in April, the NBL Canada held its first All-Star Game at Halifax Metro Centre.

For its second season, the team salary cap remained at $150,000, with the possibility of an increase in the future. The NBL Canada also considered several cities in the Maritimes, Ontario, and Quebec, including Sydney, Nova Scotia. The league soon welcomed the Windsor Express after an ownership group from Windsor, Ontario, and Detroit, led by Dartis Willis Sr., began investing in the expansion team in June 2012. The team, which was approved into the league in late July, would play out of WFCU Centre. On the other hand, the Quebec Kebs, who had relocated to Laval, Quebec, in the offseason, left the league after experiencing challenges in their first year. By November, the Kebs were replaced with the Montreal Jazz, who would compete at Centre Pierre Charbonneau. In the 2012–13 season, the league consisted of eight teams separated into divisions: four teams competed in the Atlantic Division, while the remaining four competed in the Central Division.

=== League changes (2013–2019) ===
The league grew to nine teams in the 2013–14 season by adding the Brampton A's and Ottawa Skyhawks, while the Montreal Jazz folded. Two teams relocated within their same regions with Oshawa Power moving to Mississauga and Summerside to Charlottetown as the Island Storm. The league returned to eight teams the following season due to Ottawa falling below league standards and failing to repay a loan to the league.

Prior to the 2014–15 season, the league announced its first national broadcast deal with beIN Sports. Starting with the 2014–15 season, two regular season games were scheduled to be aired each week with special coverage for playoffs and special events such as the All Star Weekend. The deal ran through the 2016–17 season.

The 2014–15 season ended in controversy as the Windsor Express were declared winners of the championship series after the Halifax Rainmen failed to show for the seventh and deciding game. The Rainmen organization claimed the reason for not appearing in the game that night because their players feared for their safety following a physical altercation earlier in the day with the Express. The Rainmen and its players were fined by the league and the team ultimately filed for bankruptcy and folded. The following 2015–16 season, the league replaced the Rainmen with the Halifax Hurricanes. The new Halifax team returned to the championship game, defeating the London Lightning to win the title in their first season.

The league expanded to ten teams in the 2016–17 season by adding the Cape Breton Highlanders and KW Titans. In the 2017–18 season, the league stayed at ten teams following the Miracles and A's folding and the addition of the Moncton Magic and St. John's Edge in the Maritimes. The initially announced a team in Greater Sudbury, but was forced to delay their launch leaving the league with four teams in Ontario and six in the Maritimes, leading the Edge to play as a member of the Central Division. The Lightning won the championship in both seasons, having won four of the first seven titles up to that point.

Following their delayed start, NBL Canada expanded into Northern Ontario with the addition of the Sudbury Five for the 2018–19 season. However, the league lost another Ontario team when the Niagara River Lions left to help found the rival Canadian Elite Basketball League. St. John's was again a member of the Central Division, but mostly played against Atlantic Division teams.

=== Pandemic and contraction (2019–2023) ===
Before the 2019–20 season, the league folded the Cape Breton Highlanders and Saint John Riptide as their respective owners tried to sell the teams and the league shrank to eight teams. During the season, the COVID-19 pandemic caused games to be suspended on March 12, 2020. The season was then entirely cancelled as the pandemic closed arenas and travel was restricted. The league initially delayed the start to the 2020–21 season as the pandemic continued into 2021. On March 4, 2021, NBL Canada announced there would be no 2020–21 season.

During the hiatus, the Halifax Hurricanes and Moncton Magic both withdrew from the league while the St. John's Edge were not granted a new lease for their arena. Subsequently, the Island Storm withdrew from the season as it was the only remaining member in the Maritimes ready to play in the 2021–22 season, leaving the league with only the four active teams in Ontario. In order to fill the schedule, the league agreed to inter-league series play with the US-based The Basketball League (TBL), run by former NBLC commissioner David Magley and his wife Evelyn.

Following the conclusion of the 2022–23 NBLC season, the remaining NBLC teams were merged along with teams from the TBL into the new Basketball Super League.

== Teams ==
=== List of teams ===
- Brampton A's – moved to Orangeville for 2015–16 season as the Orangeville A's.
  - Orangeville A's – folded after the 2016–17 season.
- Cape Breton Highlanders – was granted a one-season hiatus for 2019–20.
- Halifax Hurricanes – Withdrew from the league in October 2021.
- Halifax Rainmen – Filed for bankruptcy in July 2015 and new franchise called the Halifax Hurricanes were announced in September 2015.
- KW Titans – Joined the BSL in 2024.
- London Lightning – Joined the BSL in 2024.
- Oshawa Power – Moved to Mississauga for 2013–14 as the Mississauga Power.
  - Mississauga Power – Two years after relocating from Oshawa, Ontario, the Power folded to make way for the new NBA D-League franchise, the Raptors 905.
- Moncton Magic – Withdrew from the league in August 2021.
- Moncton Miracles – Ceased operations following the 2016–17 season and was replaced by a new franchise called the Moncton Magic.
- Montreal Jazz – Played the 2012–13 NBL Canada season, sat out the 2013–14 NBL Canada season and then folded.
- Niagara River Lions – Joined the Canadian Elite Basketball League for the 2019 season.
- Ottawa SkyHawks – Removed following the 2013–14 NBL Canada season after failing to repay a loan from the league.
- Quebec Kebs – the Quebec Kebs relocated to Laval, Quebec, after the initial 2011–12 NBL Canada season but folded before the start of the 2012–13 season.
- Saint John Mill Rats – renamed as Saint John Riptide for 2016–17.
  - Saint John Riptide – was granted a one-season hiatus for 2019–20.
- St. John's Edge – last played in the 2019–20 season and officially left the league following the 2022 season.
- Sudbury Five – joined the BSL in 2024
- Summerside Storm – moved to Charlottetown for 2013–14 as the Island Storm.
  - Island Storm – last played in the 2019–20 season and not included in the 2023 schedule.
- Windsor Express – joined the BSL in 2024

=== Champions ===
Season	Champion	Runner-up
2011–12	London Lightning	Halifax Rainmen
2012–13	London Lightning	Summerside Storm
2013–14	Windsor Express	Island Storm
2014–15	Windsor Express	Halifax Rainmen
2015–16	Halifax Hurricanes	London Lightning
2016–17	London Lightning	Halifax Hurricanes
2017–18	London Lightning	Halifax Hurricanes
2018–19	Moncton Magic	St. John's Edge
2019–20	Not awarded due to COVID-19 pandemic in Canada	
2020–21	Not awarded due to COVID-19 pandemic in Canada	
2021–22	London Lightning	KW Titans
2022–23	London Lightning	Windsor Express

The London Lightning have the most championships with six wins, the Windsor Express are second with two wins. The Halifax Rainmen and the Island Storm have appeared in two league finals failing to win the trophy. The Sudbury Five are currently the only active team to have never reached the finals.

Teams	Win	Loss	Total	Year(s) won	Year(s) lost
London Lightning	6	1	7	2012, 2013, 2017, 2018, 2022, 2023	2016
Windsor Express	2	1	3	2014, 2015	2023
Halifax Hurricanes	1	2	3	2016	2017, 2018
Moncton Magic	1	0	1	2019	—
Halifax Rainmen	0	2	2	—	2012, 2015
Summerside/Island Storm	0	2	2	—	2013, 2014
St. John's Edge	0	1	1	—	2019
KW Titans	0	1	1	—	2022
Sudbury Five	0	0	0	—	—

== Player records ==
Statistics below are for all-time leaders at the end of the 2022 regular season.

Points
Rank	Player	Years	Points
1	(United States) Anthony Anderson	2011–2018	4,748
2	(United States) Ryan Anderson	2013–2020	3,419
3	(United States) Billy White	2015–present	3,086
4	(United States) Kirk Williams Jr.	2011–2022	2,997
5	(United States) Gabe Freeman	2011–2019	2,874
6	(United States) Chris Commons	2012–2017	2,831
7	(United States) Anthony Anderson	2012–2014; 2015–2017	2,821
8	(United States) Brandon Robinson	2011–2013; 2014–2015; 2016	2,783
9	(United States) Garrett Williamson	2013–2020	2,756
10	(United States) Terry Thomas	2015–present	2,637

Rebounds
Rank	Player	Years	Rebounds
1	(United States) Ryan Anderson	2013–2020	1,411
2	(United States) Billy White	2015–present	1,409
3	(United States) Gabe Freeman	2011–2019	1,406
4	(United States) Marvin Phillips	2012–2020	1,317
5	(United States) Kirk Williams Jr.	2012–2022	1,214
6	(United States) Chris Commons	2012–2017	1,057
7	(Canada) Anthony Anderson	2011–2018	1,047
8	(United States) Kevin Loiselle	2012–2018	1,030
9	(United States) Al Stewart	2011–2018	1,020
10	(United States) Nick Evans	2012–2020	995

Assists
Rank	Player	Years	Assists
1	(United States) Cliff Clinkscales	2013–2019	1,660
2	(United States) Anthony Anderson	2011–2020	1,396
3	(United States) Al Stewart	2011–2020	1,215
4	(United States) Darren Duncan	2012–2014; 2016–2018	1,119
5	(Canada) Alex Johnson	2013–2016; 2017–2020	1,080
6	(United States) Doug Herring Jr.	2013–2019	901
7	(United States) Ryan Anderson	2013–2020	840
8	(United States) Maurice Jones	2016–2020	776
9	(United States) Nick Okorie	2012–2014; 2015–2017	700
10	(United States) Horace Wormely	2016–2019	692

Games played
Rank	Player	Years	Games
1	(United States) Kirk Williams Jr.	2012–2022	253
2	(United States) Anthony Anderson	2011–2018	237
3	(United States) Al Stewart	2011–2020	227
4	(United States) Clifford Clinkscales	2013–2018	224
5	(United States) Ryan Anderson	2013–2020	224
6	(Canada) Alex Johnson	2013–2020	218
7	(Canada) Tramar Sutherland	2014–2020	196
8	(United States) Billy White	2015–present	184
9	(United States) Nick Evans	2012–2020	181
10	(Canada) Cordell Jeanty	2012–2019	177

== Awards ==
The NBL Canada annually announces the winners of eight awards. Players can be named Most Valuable Player, Canadian of the Year, Defensive Player of the Year, Rookie of the Year, Newcomer of the Year, Sixth Man of the Year. The league also awards the Coach of the Year and Executive of the Year. In addition, the top player in the NBL Canada Finals wins Finals Most Valuable Player. After the 2015–16 season, the league started announcing Commissioner's Awards to groups that helped support it, including ownership groups, teams, and referees. These awards were first handed out by Dave Magley.

Until the 2013–14 season, the NBL Canada held All-Star Weekend every year. In the 2012 game, players Joey Haywood and Eddie Smith chose each team through a fantasy draft. The best performer in the game was named All-Star Game Most Valuable Player. Starting with the next All-Star game, the league began matching top players from the Central Division with those from the Atlantic Division. At least three Canadian players were required on each team. The NBL Canada discontinued the event after the 2014 game.

== List of commissioners ==
The commissioner of the NBL Canada is the league's chief executive and is elected by the board of directors and a group of representatives from each team. Since Magley's resignation in 2017, Audley Stephenson has been acting as deputy commissioner.

Commissioner	Years	Notes
John Kennedy	2011–2012	Resigned after the inaugural season due to a family emergency.
Paul Riley	2013–2015	Stint ceased following the 2015 NBL Canada Finals controversy.
Dave Magley	2015–2017	Oversaw the investigation of the 2015 NBL Finals.
Audley Stephenson	2022–2023	Took over as Commissioner in the final season in 2022 following the COVID-19 pandemic. Had previously served as Deputy Commissioner and VP of Basketball Operations.

== See also ==
- National Basketball League: played one season 1993–1994 (from former World Basketball League (1987–1992)
- Canadian National Basketball League: (2002–2004)
- Canadian Elite Basketball League (2019–present)
