= List of current NBL Canada team rosters =

Below is a list of current NBL Canada team rosters:

== Atlantic Division ==
There are a total of 5 teams in the Atlantic Division.

=== Cape Breton Highlanders ===
Cape Breton Highlanders roster
Players
Coaches

Pos.	No.	Nat.	Name	Ht.	Wt.	Age
G		(United States)	Branch, Jamal	6 ft 3 in (1.91 m)	170 lb (77 kg)	33 – 30 September 1992
C	22	(Canada)	Craig, Jabari	6 ft 10 in (2.08 m)	235 lb (107 kg)	30 – 8 August 1995
G		(Canada)	Famutimi, Olu	6 ft 5 in (1.96 m)	220 lb (100 kg)	41 – 21 February 1984
C	32	(United States)	Giddings, Tanner	6 ft 10 in (2.08 m)	220 lb (100 kg)	31 – 17 April 1994
F	23	(Canada)	Johnson, Chris	6 ft 5 in (1.96 m)	205 lb (93 kg)	37 – 13 July 1988
PF	21	(United States)	Jones, Kenny	6 ft 6 in (1.98 m)	215 lb (98 kg)	41 – 17 January 1984
SG	1	(United States)	Massey Jr., Bruce	6 ft 3 in (1.91 m)	195 lb (88 kg)	35 – 2 September 1990
F	6	(United States)	McCullough, O'Louis	6 ft 6 in (1.98 m)	220 lb (100 kg)	43 – 13 March 1982
SG	11	(Canada)	Redpath, Aaron	6 ft 4 in (1.93 m)	195 lb (88 kg)	33 – 11 September 1992
SG	9	(Canada)	Reynolds, Jamal	6 ft 4 in (1.93 m)	175 lb (79 kg)	31 – 27 February 1994
PG	3	(United States)	Taylor, Justin	6 ft 3 in (1.91 m)	205 lb (93 kg)	40 – 6 December 1985
G	5	(United States)	Walker, Deshaunt	6 ft 0 in (1.83 m)	170 lb (77 kg)	34 – 21 September 1991
F	13	(United States)	Williams, George	6 ft 5 in (1.96 m)	220 lb (100 kg)	35 – 16 April 1990

Head coach

- Bernardo Fitz-Gonzalez

Legend

- (C) Team captain
- (I) Inactive
- Injured

- Roster
Updated: December 17, 2018

=== Halifax Hurricanes ===
Halifax Hurricanes roster
Players
Coaches

Pos.	No.	Nat.	Name	Ht.	Wt.	Age
F	15	(Canada)	Arseneault, Kyle	6 ft 5 in (1.96 m)	220 lb (100 kg)	31 – 24 October 1994
PG	12	(United States)	Clinkscales, Cliff (C)	1.84 m (6 ft 0 in)	185 lb (84 kg)	41 – 11 March 1984
F	25	(United States)	Freeman, Gabe	6 ft 6 in (1.98 m)	205 lb (93 kg)	40 – 5 November 1985
PF		(United States)	Hall, Carl	2.03 m (6 ft 8 in)	238 lb (108 kg)	36 – 29 March 1989
SF	1	(Canada)	Johnson, Chris	1.96 m (6 ft 5 in)	205 lb (93 kg)	37 – 13 July 1988
F	20	(United States)	Johnson, Tremayne	2.01 m (6 ft 7 in)	200 lb (91 kg)	36 – 20 August 1989
G	13	(United States)	Kindred, Joel	1.95 m (6 ft 5 in)	194 lb (88 kg)	34 – 7 January 1991
SG	14	(United States)	Mason, Antoine	1.91 m (6 ft 3 in)	210 lb (95 kg)	33 – 24 May 1992
G	10	(Canada)	Scott, Calvin Tyler	6 ft 3 in (1.91 m)	200 lb (91 kg)	33 – 10 March 1992
PG	4	(United States)	Sibley, Devin	1.88 m (6 ft 2 in)	174 lb (79 kg)	29 – 9 February 1996
PF	22	(Canada)	Waithe, Marvell	6 ft 9 in (2.06 m)	216 lb (98 kg)	38 – 20 October 1987
PF	25	(United States)	Washington, CJ	2.03 m (6 ft 8 in)	219 lb (99 kg)	33 – 28 February 1992
G	2	(United States)	Zimmerman, Ta'Quan	1.88 m (6 ft 2 in)	200 lb (91 kg)	34 – 2 December 1991

Head coach

- (Canada) Mike Leslie

Legend

- (C) Team captain
- Injured

- Roster
Updated: January 9, 2020

=== Island Storm ===
Note: Flags indicate national team eligibility at FIBA-sanctioned events. Players may hold other non-FIBA nationalities not displayed.

Island Storm roster
Players
Coaches

Pos.	No.	Nat.	Name	Ht.	Wt.	Age
G	10	(Canada)	Campbell, Alex	6 ft 4 in (1.93 m)	200 lb (91 kg)	32 – 21 January 1993
PF	15	(Canada)	Diankulu, Lewis	6 ft 7 in (2.01 m)	215 lb (98 kg)
F	1	(United States)	Edwards, Abrian	6 ft 5 in (1.96 m)	210 lb (95 kg)	30 – 9 April 1995
C	13	(United States)	Haslem, Jailan	6 ft 10 in (2.08 m)	260 lb (120 kg)
SG	20	(Canada)	Landon, Darnell	6 ft 2 in (1.88 m)	184 lb (83 kg)
G	24	(Canada)	Lewis, Marcus	6 ft 4 in (1.93 m)		33 – 16 February 1992
SF	11	(United States)	Lillard, Antwon	6 ft 5 in (1.96 m)	200 lb (91 kg)	30 – 6 November 1995
G	6	(United States)	Loyd, Johnathan	6 ft 5 in (1.96 m)	215 lb (98 kg)	34 – 15 August 1991
G	5	(United States)	Robinson, Robbie	6 ft 5 in (1.96 m)	215 lb (98 kg)	36 – 1 February 1989
PG	3	(United States)	Shamburger, Keith	5 ft 11 in (1.80 m)	170 lb (77 kg)	33 – 28 October 1992
F	7	(United States)	Wright, Nathan	6 ft 7 in (2.01 m)	225 lb (102 kg)

Head coach

- (Canada) Tim Kendrick

Assistant coach(es)

- (Canada) Jeff Morrison
- (Canada) Lonnie States

Team manager

- (Canada) Frankie Beaton

Legend

- (C) Team captain
- Injured

- Roster
- Transactions
Updated: December 27, 2019

=== Saint John Riptide ===
Note: Flags indicate national team eligibility at FIBA-sanctioned events. Players may hold other non-FIBA nationalities not displayed.

Saint John Riptide roster
Players
Coaches

Pos.	No.	Nat.	Name	Ht.	Wt.	Age
PG	4	(United States)	Arrington, Brent	6 ft 3 in (1.91 m)	190 lb (86 kg)	33 – 12 July 1992
G	15	(United States)	Bartley, Frank	6 ft 3 in (1.91 m)	215 lb (98 kg)	31 – 25 February 1994
G	6	(Canada)	Binney, Marvin	6 ft 3 in (1.91 m)	195 lb (88 kg)	35 – 15 December 1990
F	1	(United States)	Dingle, Daniel	6 ft 7 in (2.01 m)	225 lb (102 kg)	31 – 14 February 1994
F	25	(Canada)	Dixon, Renaldo	6 ft 9 in (2.06 m)	225 lb (102 kg)	35 – 20 September 1990
F	0	(United States)	Early, Chris	6 ft 7 in (2.01 m)	235 lb (107 kg)	37 – 5 November 1988
PG	55	(Canada)	Holmes, Andrew	5 ft 10 in (1.78 m)	175 lb (79 kg)
F	33	(United States)	Isom, Mareik	6 ft 10 in (2.08 m)	230 lb (100 kg)	31 – 25 July 1994
SG	34	(Canada)	Landon, Darnell	6 ft 3 in (1.91 m)	190 lb (86 kg)
G	23	(United States)	Mordi, Jeremiah	6 ft 3 in (1.91 m)	193 lb (88 kg)
G	12	(Canada)	Osse, Kemy	6 ft 2 in (1.88 m)	200 lb (91 kg)	32 – 12 March 1993
C	32	(United States)	Phillips, Randy	6 ft 8 in (2.03 m)	245 lb (111 kg)
F	35	(United States)	Pitchford, Walter	6 ft 11 in (2.11 m)	238 lb (108 kg)	33 – 24 April 1992

Head coach

- (United States) Nelson Terroba

Assistant coach(es)

- (Canada) Aaron Drummond
- (Canada) Randy Loatman
- (Canada) Jim Palmer
- (Canada) Paul Vaughan

Legend

- (C) Team captain
- (I) Inactive
- Injured

- Roster
- Transactions
Updated: December 3, 2018

== Central Division ==
There are a total of 5 teams in the Central Division.

=== KW Titans ===
KW Titans roster
Players
Coaches

Pos.	No.	Nat.	Name	Ht.	Wt.	Age
SF	0	(United States)	Maultsby, Marque	6 ft 3 in (1.91 m)	165 lb (75 kg)	26 – 10 August 1999
PG	1	(United States)	Burns, Jordan	6 ft 2 in (1.88 m)	175 lb (79 kg)	28 – 28 August 1997
F	3	(United States)	Lee Jr., Anthony	6 ft 9 in (2.06 m)	240 lb (110 kg)	34 – 24 May 1991
F	5	(United States)	Lightfoot, Jaquan	6 ft 7 in (2.01 m)	235 lb (107 kg)
F	6	(United States)	Akano, Sam	6 ft 6 in (1.98 m)	180 lb (82 kg)	32 – 8 August 1993
G	8	(United States)	Barnes, Dee	6 ft 4 in (1.93 m)	193 lb (88 kg)	25 – 16 May 2000
C	10	(Canada)	Malnerich, Justin	6 ft 2 in (1.88 m)
SG	11	(United States)	Lewis, Victor	6 ft 5 in (1.96 m)	211 lb (96 kg)
PG	15	(Canada)	Kanku, Graddy	6 ft 5 in (1.96 m)
PF	20	(United States)	Smith, Romeo	6 ft 7 in (2.01 m)		30 – 7 October 1995
SF	22	(United States)	Welch, Dominick	6 ft 5 in (1.96 m)	205 lb (93 kg)	27 – 27 August 1998
F	25	(United States)	Jones, Darian	6 ft 9 in (2.06 m)	200 lb (91 kg)	27 – 27 August 1998
SG		(United States)	Fox, Andre	6 ft 3 in (1.91 m)	190 lb (86 kg)	29 – 30 August 1996
G		(United States)	Brennen, Nick	6 ft 5 in (1.96 m)	175 lb (79 kg)

Head coach

- (United States) Cliff Clinkscales

Legend

- (C) Team captain
- (I) Inactive
- Injured

- Roster
Updated: November 23, 2024

=== London Lightning ===
Note: Flags indicate national team eligibility at FIBA-sanctioned events. Players may hold other non-FIBA nationalities not displayed.

London Lightning roster
Players
Coaches

Pos.	No.	Nat.	Name	Ht.	Wt.	Age
G	6	(Canada)	Binney, Marvin (injured)	6 ft 3 in (1.91 m)	195 lb (88 kg)	35 – 15 December 1990
SF	0	(United States)	Bolden, Mo	6 ft 10 in (2.08 m)	205 lb (93 kg)	36 – 18 August 1989
SF	60	(United States)	Capers, Marcus	6 ft 4 in (1.93 m)	180 lb (82 kg)	35 – 21 December 1989
G/F	35	(United States)	Gaines, A. J.	6 ft 4 in (1.93 m)		32 – 5 December 1993
SF	14	(United States)	Isom, Mareik	6 ft 9 in (2.06 m)	217 lb (98 kg)	31 – 25 July 1994
F	13	(Canada)	Iyekekpolor, Otas	6 ft 8 in (2.03 m)	220 lb (100 kg)	29 – 20 June 1996
F	21	(Canada)	Lufile, Abednego	6 ft 7 in (2.01 m)	240 lb (110 kg)	31 – 8 June 1994
C	32	(United States)	Phillips, Randy	6 ft 8 in (2.03 m)	240 lb (110 kg)	30 – 17 July 1995
G	5	(United States)	Strong, Omar	5 ft 9 in (1.75 m)	175 lb (79 kg)	35 – 16 May 1990
G	10	(United States)	Tate, Jaylon (injured)	6 ft 3 in (1.91 m)	170 lb (77 kg)	30 – 16 January 1995
SF	15	(Canada)	Williamson, Garrett	6 ft 7 in (2.01 m)	200 lb (91 kg)	37 – 15 June 1988

Head coach

- Doug Plumb

Assistant coach(es)

- (Canada) Nate Benjamin

Legend

- (C) Team captain
- Injured

- Roster
- Transactions

=== St. John's Edge ===
Note: Flags indicate national team eligibility at FIBA-sanctioned events. Players may hold other non-FIBA nationalities not displayed.

St. John's Edge roster
Players
Coaches

Pos.	No.	Nat.	Name	Ht.	Wt.	Age
G/F	3	(United States)	Brandon, Montay	6 ft 8 in (2.03 m)	225 lb (102 kg)	32 – 3 September 1993
PG	15	(United States)	Broome, Cane	6 ft 0 in (1.83 m)	165 lb (75 kg)	31 – 29 November 1994
F	13	(Canada)	Burnatowski, Murphy	6 ft 5 in (1.96 m)	229 lb (104 kg)	35 – 18 July 1990
PG	55	(Canada)	Cadougan, Junior	6 ft 1 in (1.85 m)	205 lb (93 kg)	35 – 7 May 1990
C	7	(United States)	Edwards, Mike	6 ft 9 in (2.06 m)	235 lb (107 kg)	28 – 20 May 1997
PG	2	(United States)	Jones, Jesse	6 ft 0 in (1.83 m)	183 lb (83 kg)	32 – 10 January 1993
PF	22	(United States)	Macon, Elijah	6 ft 9 in (2.06 m)	240 lb (110 kg)	32 – 3 November 1993
SF	9	(Canada)	Moffat, Noel	6 ft 5 in (1.96 m)	190 lb (86 kg)	32 – 9 August 1993
SG	4	(United States)	Richardson, Ryan	6 ft 4 in (1.93 m)	195 lb (88 kg)	30 – 14 November 1995
G/F	14	(United States)	Thomas, Ahmad	6 ft 3 in (1.91 m)	220 lb (100 kg)	30 – 8 February 1995
G/F	20	(United States)	Ward, Karrington	6 ft 7 in (2.01 m)	205 lb (93 kg)	32 – 14 March 1993
F	1	(Canada)	Watson, Tyrone	6 ft 5 in (1.96 m)	225 lb (102 kg)	35 – 12 July 1990

Head coach

- (United States) Steven Marcus

Assistant coach(es)

- (Canada) Jeff Morrison
- (Canada) Glen Sooley

Team manager

- (Canada) Carl English

Legend

- (C) Team captain
- (I) Inactive
- Injured

- Roster
- Transactions
Updated: December 23, 2019

=== Sudbury Five ===
Note: Flags indicate national team eligibility at FIBA-sanctioned events. Players may hold other non-FIBA nationalities not displayed.

Sudbury Five roster
Players
Coaches

Pos.	No.	Nat.	Name	Ht.	Wt.	Age
G	1	(United States)	Bland, Jaylen	6 ft 2 in (1.88 m)	205 lb (93 kg)	32 – 29 March 1993
G	12	(Canada)	Duvivier, Malcolm	6 ft 2 in (1.88 m)	210 lb (95 kg)	30 – 28 March 1995
SF	15	(United States)	Holder, J.R.	6 ft 6 in (1.98 m)	180 lb (82 kg)	31 – 24 August 1994
PF	11	(United States)	Johnson, Marlon	6 ft 10 in (2.08 m)	215 lb (98 kg)	31 – 28 February 1994
PF	31	(United States)	Lewis, Carl	6 ft 10 in (2.08 m)	285 lb (129 kg)	24 – 1 April 2001
SG	0	(Canada)	Moore, Josiah	6 ft 5 in (1.96 m)	215 lb (98 kg)	33 – 27 November 1992
F	21	(Canada)	Pryce, Jelane	6 ft 8 in (2.03 m)	196 lb (89 kg)	32 – 29 May 1993
PG	3	(Canada)	Puddister, Joey	6 ft 0 in (1.83 m)	175 lb (79 kg)	33 – 15 July 1992
G	2	(United States)	Rayson, Braylon	5 ft 9 in (1.75 m)	190 lb (86 kg)	30 – 25 December 1994
G/F	9	(Canada)	Serresse, Georges	6 ft 3 in (1.91 m)	201 lb (91 kg)	35 – 29 April 1990
F	22	(United States)	Skeens, Brady	6 ft 7 in (2.01 m)	211 lb (96 kg)	30 – 8 August 1995
G/F	4	(United States)	Williams, Dexter	6 ft 4 in (1.93 m)	212 lb (96 kg)	32 – 27 March 1993

Head coach

- (United States) Logan Stutz

Legend

- (C) Team captain
- (I) Inactive
- Injured

- Roster
- Transactions
Updated: December 23, 2019

=== Windsor Express ===
Note: Flags indicate national team eligibility at FIBA-sanctioned events. Players may hold other non-FIBA nationalities not displayed.

Windsor Express roster
Players
Coaches

Pos.	No.	Nat.	Name	Ht.	Wt.	Age
G/F	2	(United States)	Taylor, Jachai	6 ft 7 in (2.01 m)	210 lb (95 kg)	28 – 29 May 1997
PG	3	(United States)	Garth, Nick	6 ft 0 in (1.83 m)	185 lb (84 kg)	29 – 29 May 1996
PG	5	(Canada)	Jackson, Ja'Myrin	6 ft 4 in (1.93 m)	187 lb (85 kg)	27 – 1 January 1998
PG	10	(Canada)	Calliste, Jason	6 ft 2 in (1.88 m)	175 lb (79 kg)	35 – 27 January 1990
PG	11	(United States)	Davis, Latin	5 ft 11 in (1.80 m)	190 lb (86 kg)	28 – 15 August 1997
PF	23	(United States)	White, Billy	6 ft 8 in (2.03 m)	235 lb (107 kg)	36 – 26 January 1989
F	24	(United States)	Stuckman, Tanner	6 ft 9 in (2.06 m)	220 lb (100 kg)	28 – 1 January 1997
PF	25	(United States)	Moss, Justin	6 ft 8 in (2.03 m)	240 lb (110 kg)	32 – 19 June 1993
C	33	(United States)	Claiborne, William	6 ft 11 in (2.11 m)	290 lb (130 kg)	29 – 19 December 1996
SF	44	(Canada)	Eleeda, Adham	6 ft 5 in (1.96 m)	205 lb (93 kg)	27 – 1 January 1998

Head coach

- (United States) Bill Jones

Assistant coach(es)

- (Canada) Aaron McDonald
- (Canada) Frank Parker

Legend

- (C) Team captain
- (I) Inactive
- Injured

- Roster
- Transactions
Updated: April 24, 2023
