= Papa Oppong =

Canadian basketball player (born 1987)

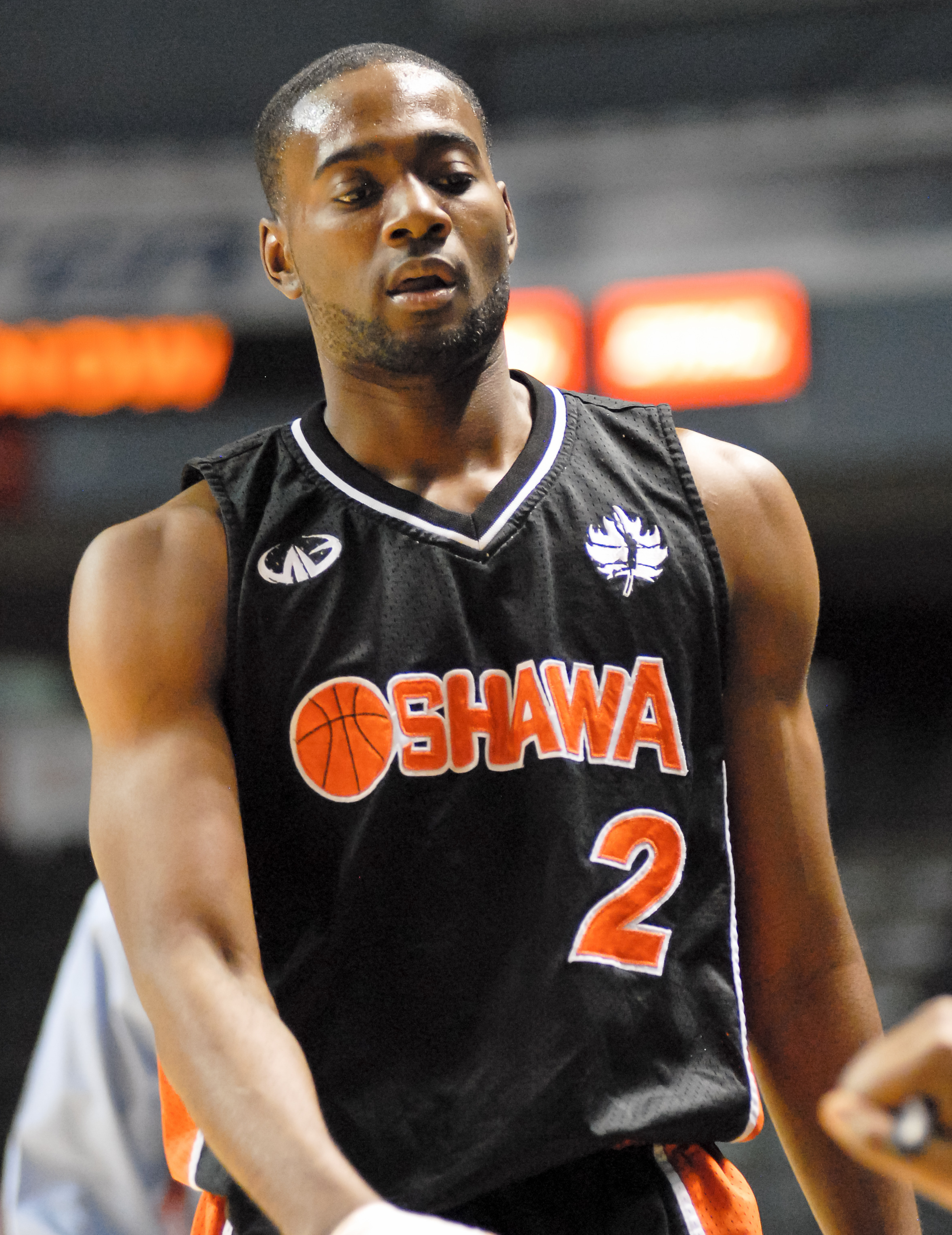
- Oppong with the Oshawa Power in 2012

Personal information
- Born: March 10, 1987 (age 38) Toronto, Ontario, Canada
- Listed height: 6 ft 4 in (1.93 m)
- Listed weight: 180 lb (82 kg)

Career information
- High school: Blessed Mother Teresa (Scarborough, Ontario)
- College: Coffeyville CC (2006–2007); Panola (2007–2008); Eastern Kentucky (2008–2010)
- NBA draft: 2010: undrafted
- Playing career: 2010–2015
- Position: Shooting guard
- Number: 2

Career history
- 2011: Halifax Rainmen
- 2012–2013: Oshawa Power
- 2013–2015: Windsor Express

Career highlights
- NBL Canada champion (2014); NBL Canada All-Star (2013); NBL Canada All-Canada Second Team (2013); Ontario Mr. Basketball (2006)

Papa Kwaku Oppong (born March 10, 1987) is a Canadian former professional basketball player in the National Basketball League of Canada (NBL). Oppong competed with three different college basketball teams from 2006 to 2010. He played with Coffeyville Community College as a freshman, Panola Junior College as a sophomore, and Eastern Kentucky of the NCAA Division I as a junior and senior.

At Panola, Oppong earned all-conference honors and led them to a fairly successful season in the NJCAA Region XIV. Entering the next season, he became a high-end Canadian recruit for programs in the NCAA. Oppong ultimately chose to play for Eastern Kentucky under head coach Jeff Neubauer. He was a starter from time to time as his junior season progressed. However, he suffered a shoulder injury in the middle of the season that sidelined him for several of his games. He returned to the starting lineup by the postseason. Oppong did not earn any major awards at the Division I level, but was considerably more effective as a senior, as he developed into a bigger scorer for Eastern Kentucky.

Oppong has spent his entire professional career in the NBL Canada. He was drafted into the league by the Halifax Rainmen at the 2011 draft as the 13th overall pick in the second round. Following a brief stint with the team, he was traded mid-season to the Oshawa Power and starred for them for the next two years. In his second season with the Power, Oppong was named to the NBL Canada All-Star reserve team and the league's All-Canada second team. After the season, he signed with the Windsor Express due to his academic obligations at the University of Windsor. In the playoffs, he played a key role by substituting for Stefan Bonneau in multiple contests, helping his team win the league title.

== Early life and high school ==
Papa was born on March 10, 1987, to Kwaku and Gertrude Oppong in Toronto, Ontario, and was raised in Pickering, Ontario. Both of his parents were natives of Ghana in West Africa, and Papa began playing soccer. He could not skate, meaning he struggled with ice hockey, Canada's most popular sport. Oppong said, "Soccer is really popular in Africa, so my dad got me into soccer. Basketball is more of my love. I was sitting down and watching Michael Jordan and Kobe and all of those guys when I was younger, and I had more of a passion for it." He learned the basics of basketball with the Ontario Basketball's Scarborough, Ontario, club team. Oppong attended Blessed Mother Teresa Catholic Secondary School in Scarborough. He helped the team win the provincial Ontario Federation of School Athletic Associations (OFSAA) championship. He was also named Ontario Mr. Basketball.

== Collegiate career ==
=== Junior college ===
Oppong began playing college basketball at Coffeyville Community College in Kansas, where he averaged 5.7 points, 2.2 rebounds, and 1.2 assists in his freshman season. For his next year, he transferred to Panola Junior College in Carthage, Texas. As a sophomore with his new team, he averaged 15.9 points, 5.4 rebounds, and 2.1 assists, shooting .488 from the field and .405 on three-pointers. In 2008, while helping the Ponies reach the semifinals of the Region XIV tournament, he earned all-conference honors

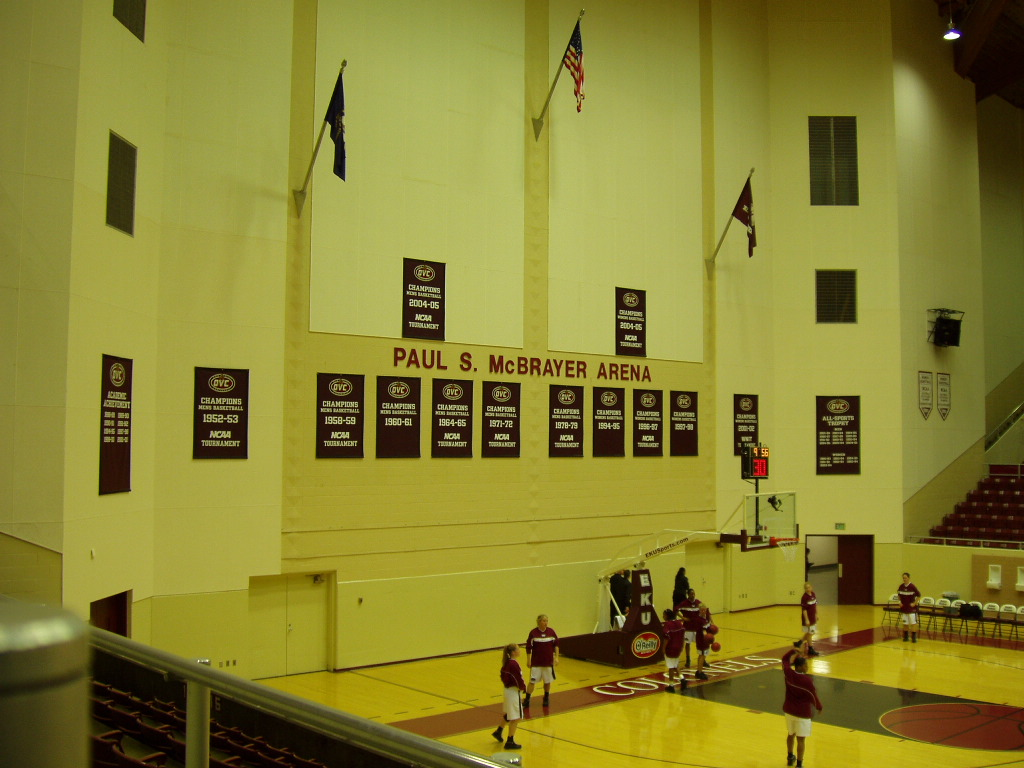
Eastern Kentucky's home arena.

=== Eastern Kentucky ===
Oppong's performances helped him get an NCAA scholarship into Eastern Kentucky. Idaho, Utah State, Colorado State, and Murray State were some of his other potential Division I destinations. He was considered one of the top Canadians committing to an NCAA program that year, in a list headlined by Andrew Nicholson and Kris Joseph. As soon as he arrived at EKU, he became close with the school. Oppong said, "From the first day, I was accepted, as soon as I stepped on campus. I was here in the summertime and there were a few guys here who I knew and as soon as we came in August, I felt like I was part of the family." Head coach Jeff Neubauer commented on him, "We think Papa Oppong will be a tough match-up for our opponents because he is a shooter, rebounder and slasher."

Oppong debuted and made his first start for the Eastern Kentucky Colonels in their season opener on November 14, 2008, against Florida International. He led his team in both rebounds and blocks. In the following week, he was named Ohio Valley Conference (OVC) Newcomer of the Week. In a win over Ball State on December 13, he recorded 11 points and a season-high 9 rebounds. However, on December 20, he separated his left shoulder after grabbing a team-high 8 rebounds vs Cincinnati. It was estimated by head coach Jeff Neubauer that he would miss a few weeks due to a torn labrum. Oppong was absent for the Colonels' five next games. He recalled the moment saying, "Cincinnati was one of our best games, but for me, I really don't like that game. It was when I actually dislocated my shoulder. And it hurt—it really hurt. The process of coming back was so hard because it took so long. When I got back, it took me a minute to get back into the flow and get adjusted." Oppong return on January 15, 2009, against Eastern Illinois, and did not make another start that season until a loss to Morehead State at the 2009 Ohio Valley Conference men's basketball tournament. Through the whole season, Oppong averaged 9.2 points, 5.4 rebounds, and 1.2 assists. He was one of Eastern Kentucky's rebounding leaders.

Heading into the 2009–10 season, Eastern Kentucky was ranked fifth in the Ohio Valley Conference, according to a coaches' preseason poll. However, Oppong said, "I think we're being overlooked but coaches polls and media polls, they don't really mean nothing. They're just people's opinions." On November 14, 2009, he made his first appearance as a senior by putting up 13 points and 4 rebounds as Eastern Kentucky easily defeated West Virginia Wesleyan College, 102–71. He posted a career-high 21 points and 4 steals and a season-high 6 rebounds in a win over Florida International on November 28. On February 6, 2010, Oppong had another notable performance, chipping in 20 points to help Eastern Kentucky slip past Jacksonville State. He capped his collegiate career with 11 points and 4 rebounds in a first-round loss to the College of Charleston at the 2010 College Basketball Invitational (CBI). By the end of the season, Oppong was averaging 11.0 points, 3.3 rebounds, 1.5 assists, and 1.4 steals.

== Professional career ==
=== 2011–12 season ===
After leaving college, Oppong took part in the draft combine for the newly formed National Basketball League of Canada (NBL) in August 2011. He was later selected by the Halifax Rainmen as the 13th overall pick in the second round of the 2011 NBL Canada draft. He made his professional debut with the Rainmen on November 3, 2011, scoring 6 points and recording 4 rebounds in a loss to the London Lightning. Through the next seven games, he saw very limited playing time, spending over 10 minutes on the court in just three contests. After averaging three points per game, Oppong was released by Halifax in early December 2011. Nevertheless, he still drew the attention of Gary Durrant, the director of basketball operations for the Oshawa Power, who pursued Oppong in the draft combine itself. Oppong said, "Gary actually called my agent and said they wanted me to come back to take another look at me. They liked me and it worked out." He was pleased at the idea of joining the Power because of it was located very close to his hometown as well. Oppong made his first appearance for Oshawa on January 12, 2012, but was scoreless with 3 personal fouls vs the Summerside Storm. He scored a season-best 10 points on January 29, lifting his team to a victory over the Moncton Miracles.

"This league is like the greatest thing that's happened for me personally. To be able to stay in my home country and earn a living playing professional basketball is a blessing."

—Oppong on the NBL Canada

=== 2012–13 season ===
Oppong began his second season at the professional level on November 3, 2012, with the Oshawa Power, when he posted 7 points and 5 rebounds in a one-point win over the Windsor Express. He set career-bests of 13 points and 8 rebounds in the following game, which was played against the London Lightning. Oppong recorded his first NBL Canada double-double on November 29, with 11 points and 10 rebounds vs the Quebec Kebs. He finished the season averaging 12.8 points, 5.2 rebounds, and 2.4 assists in 31.1 minutes per game and 38 games. In April 2013, Oppong was named an All-Star reserve for the Central Division team at the 2013 NBL Canada All-Star Game. On April 14, he scored 21 points for the Central Division All-Stars, who were coached by Micheal Ray Richardson, as they won 150–145. In addition, Oppong was named to the league's All-Canada second team.

=== 2013–14 season ===
On May 2, 2013, Oppong was announced as one of five protected players for the Mississauga Power, who had relocated from Oshawa, meaning that the Power had exclusive rights to attempt contract negotiations with him until September 16. However, Oppong informed the Power's management that he wanted to attend the University of Windsor so that he could become a teacher in the future. The Power negotiated a trade with the Windsor Express that saw Oppong join the Express in exchange for a second-round draft pick. He signed with the Express on September 8, the same day as fellow acquisitions Quinnel Brown and DeAndre Thomas. Oppong debuted for his new team on November 1, 2013, with 15 points, 5 rebounds, and 4 assists in a win over the London Lightning. He surpassed the 20-point mark against his former team, the Power, on December 21, as he added a season-best 23 points, 5 rebounds, and 5 steals. Early the 2013 playoffs, head coach Bill Jones was forced to use Oppong as a substitute for star guard Stefan Bonneau, who was struggling with a knee injury. The backup most notably notched 16 points in Game 4 of his team's semifinal series vs the Lightning. Oppong said, "I wouldn't say it's a lot of pressure. I was just the next man up and I'm trying to help the team." Windsor eventually defeated London, who were the back-to-back champions in the league's first two seasons, to advance to the Finals series against the Island Storm. In the decisive Game 7 against the Storm, Oppong saw 15 minutes of play, scoring 3 points and committing 4 personal fouls. However, his team won the game to win the league championship.

=== 2015–16 season ===
On November 3, 2015, Oppong was announced as one of the members of the Windsor Express squad that would face Raptors 905 of the NBA Development League in an exhibition game on November 5 at the WFCU Centre. He joined many Express players that had played for the team in the 2014–15 season and those signed for 2015–16, including 2015 league Finals MVP Kirk Williams and former teammate Adrian Moss. 905, the D-League affiliate of the Toronto Raptors, was created following the 2014–15 NBL Canada season and resulted in the folding of the NBL franchise, the Mississauga Power.

== Personal life ==
As of December 2013, Oppong is a full-time student at the University of Windsor teacher's college. Prior to 2013, he notified the Oshawa Power front office about his plans to pursue a career in education, leading to his trade to the Windsor Express. In the case that Windsor had to play out of their division, his basketball career forced him to miss a few days of school. Oppong has experience as a student-teacher at Catholic Central High School in Windsor, Ontario. In late 2013, he said, "It's been challenging. It's a matter of juggling things and time management. I'm really grateful the Windsor Express have worked with me and supported me." Express head coach Bill Jones commented, "I really like Papa and respect what he's doing. I wish we could have the kid with us every day because I'm sure he'd have a bigger role with us but he's doing what he can and playing 22 minutes a game and playing them hard." Oppong became the third member of his family to attend the University of Windsor, following his sister. He plans to become either a physical education or history teacher once he gets his teaching certificate. While at Eastern Kentucky University, he intentionally majored in general studies so that he could attend teacher's college for one year. Oppong now teaches grade 6 and 7 Mathematics at Highland Middle School, located in North York, Ontario

Oppong has seven siblings, three sisters and four brothers, ranging from about eight years older than him to approximately 15 years younger than him. From youngest to oldest, they are Edwin, Edward, Kevin, Kojo, Nanayaa, Nana, and Olivia. Papa said, "I call my house the zoo because we have so many people living there. There's always something to do... somebody's always home. It's not just my immediate family, we always have people coming through our house. My house is very lively, I like it."

Outside of basketball, Oppong is a fan of the Toronto Maple Leafs of the National Hockey League (NHL) and some of his favourite music artists include Jay Z and Fabolous. As a part of his pre-game routine, he listens to "Who Gon Stop Me", by Jay Z and Kanye West, to pump him up. While attending Eastern Kentucky, he claimed that the most interesting class he took was psychology.
