= Kevin Loiselle =

Canadian professional basketball player (born 1988)

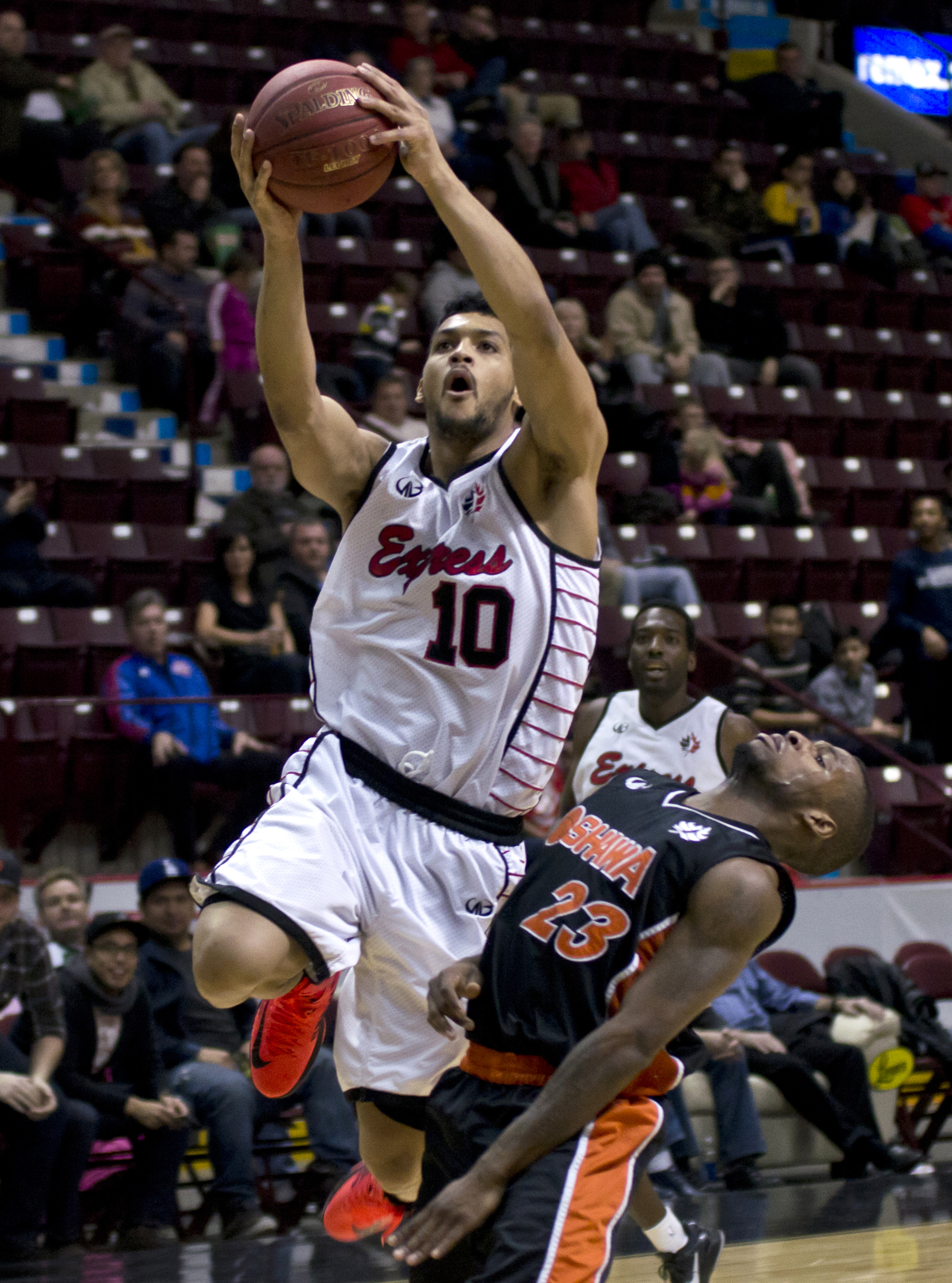
- Loiselle drives to the rim in 2013

Free agent
- Position: Forward

Personal information
- Born: May 13, 1988 (age 38) Montreal, Quebec, Canada
- Listed height: 6 ft 6 in (1.98 m)
- Listed weight: 220 lb (100 kg)

Career information
- College: Dawson (2007–2010); Maine Fort Kent (2010–2011)
- NBA draft: 2011: undrafted
- Playing career: 2012–present

Career history
- 2012–2015: Windsor Express
- 2015–2016: London Lightning
- 2016: Halifax Hurricanes
- 2016–2017: Pacific Caesar Surabaya
- 2017: Flying Wheel Makassar
- 2017-2018: Cape Breton Highlanders
- 2018: Windsor Express
- 2023: Montreal Tundra

Career highlights
- Jawa Pos Pro Tournament champion (2016); IBL All-Star (2017); 3× NBL Canada champion (2014–2016); NBL Canada All-Star (2014); 2× NBL Canada All-Canada Team (2013, 2014); First-team All-NBL Canada (2013); Second-team All-Collégial AAA (2008)

Kevin Loiselle (born May 13, 1988) is a Canadian professional basketball player who last played for Montreal Tundra of the Basketball Super League (BSL). He played college basketball for the Dawson Blues and the Maine-Fort Kent Bengals.

== College career ==
Loiselle was a second-team All-Collégial AAA selection with Dawson College in 2008.

== Professional career ==
Loiselle has been named to multiple NBL All-Canada Teams and was named an NBL Canada All-Star in 2014. He was selected by the Express with the 1st pick in the second round of the 2012 NBL Canada draft. He helped the team capture two league titles.

On November 4, 2015, Loiselle signed with the London Lightning, remaining in the Canadian league. Team head coach Kyle Julius said, "If you watched him play last year he looked like a small cog in the wheel, but I don't think he was valued enough." But on February 16, 2016, Loiselle left the Lightning, with the team retaining his NBL Canada playing rights. At the time, Loiselle planned on playing in the Dominican Republic.

On March 11, 2016, Loiselle was traded by the Lightning to the Halifax Hurricanes in exchange for Anthony Criswell.

In October 2016, Loiselle sign with Pacific Caesar Surabaya to play in Perbasi Cup 2016, then Loiselle continued playing with Pacific Caesar until in Indonesian Basketball League 2017.
