= NBL Canada Finals =

The NBL Canada Finals is the championship series of the National Basketball League of Canada (NBL). It is played between the winners of the Central Division and Atlantic Division. The first team to win four games in the series is declared NBL Canada champion. It has been played since the league's inaugural 2011–12 season. The London Lightning and Windsor Express are currently the only teams that have claimed the title, with the latter one winning the last two editions of the Finals. Only two coaches have won the championship so far.

In the 2015 NBL Canada Finals, the Express won by default after the Halifax Rainmen forfeited Game 7 due to safety concerns following a pre-game brawl. In the first two series in NBL history, head coach Micheal Ray Richardson led the London Lightning to back-to-back championships. Richardson was named Coach of the Year for both seasons. Bill Jones led Windsor to consecutive titles as well.

== Finals MVP ==
The player with the top performances in the NBL Finals is named Finals Most Valuable Player. Its first two recipients, Gabe Freeman, who won the 2012 Finals with the Lightning, is the sole player to be named regular season MVP the same year.

Season	Player	Position	Team
2012	(United States) Gabe Freeman	Forward	London Lightning
2013	(United States) Marvin Phillips	Forward	London Lightning
2014	(United States) Stefan Bonneau	Guard	Windsor Express
2015	(United States) Kirk Williams	Forward	Windsor Express
2016	(United States) Justin Johnson	Guard	Halifax Hurricanes
2017	(United States) Ryan Anderson	Forward	London Lightning
2018	(United States) Garrett Williamson	Forward	London Lightning
2019	(United States) Trey Kell	Guard	Moncton Magic
2020			
