= Dane Smith =

Dane Smith may refer to:

- Dane Smith (basketball) (born 1989), Canadian basketball player
- Dane Allan Smith, Canadian visual effects producer

== See also ==
- Dane Bird-Smith (born 1992), Australian racewalker
- Dan Smith (disambiguation)
