= 2014 NBL Canada All-Star Game =

The 2014 NBL Canada All-Star Game was the third edition of the National Basketball League of Canada All-Star Game, an exhibition basketball game played on April 20, 2014 in Charlottetown, Prince Edward Island. It was played between the top players from both of the league's divisions, the Central and Atlantic, the second time the event was in such a format. The All-Star Game took place in Eastlink Centre, the home court of the Island Storm. The players who competed were decided by votes from NBL coaches. Antonio Ballard, who played with the Storm, was named Most Valuable Player after putting up 39 points, 10 rebounds, and 6 assists.

== Results ==
Each team had to feature at least three Canadian players, and each team was represented by a minimum of one player. They both had five starters and five reserves. Justin Tubbs and Trayvon Lathan were nominated to compete, but were playing overseas at the same time. Stanley Robinson of the Moncton Miracles was facing an injury and failed to appear.

April 20, 2014
2:05 PM

Boxscore

Central All-Stars	165–170	Atlantic All-Stars
Scoring by quarter: 32–35, 46–46, 48–44, 39–45
Pts: Commons 25; Rebs: Loiselle 14; Asts: Johnson 13		Pts: Ballard 39; Rebs: Parham 17; Asts: Clinkscales 15

Eastlink Centre, Charlottetown

Starters:			Pts	Reb	Ast
PG	5	(United States) Stefan Bonneau	24	3	7
SG	20	(United States) Cedric Moodie	23	8	7
SF	15	(Canada) Garrett Williamson	18	8	11
PF	24	(United States) Chris Commons	25	7	2
C	40	(United States) Cavell Johnson	12	8	4
Reserves:					
SG	2	(United States) Morgan Lewis	13	3	3
PF	10	(Canada) Kevin Loiselle	17	14	2
PG	11	(Canada) Alex Johnson	6	5	13
C	42	(United States) Jermaine Johnson	21	5	4
SG	44	(United States) Ryan Anderson	6	5	8
Head coach:
(United States) Bill Jones

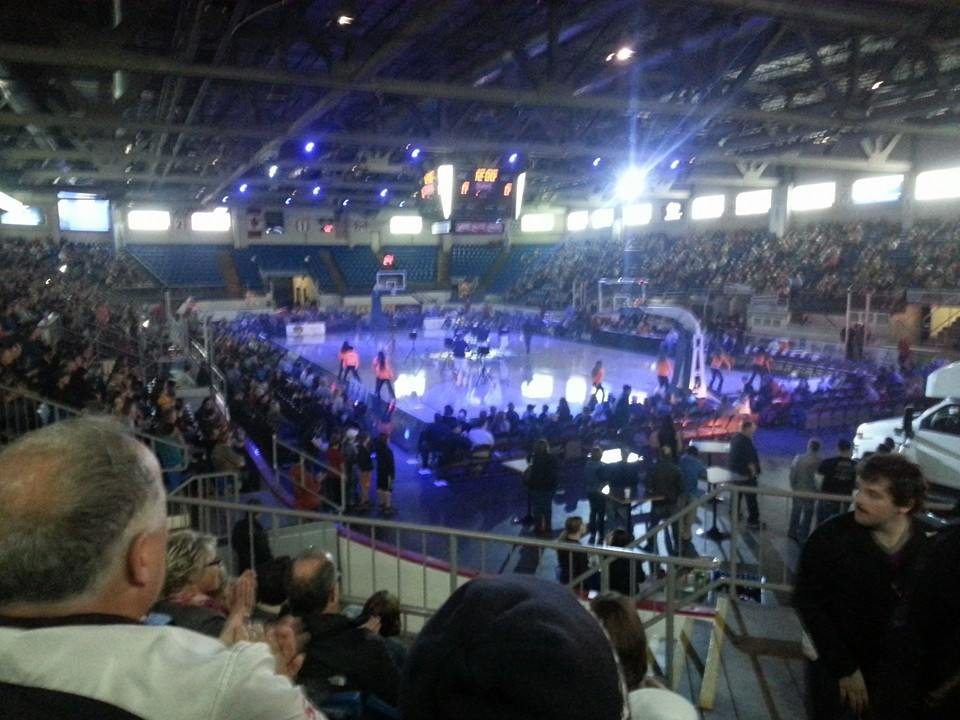
Eastlink Centre

2014 NBL All-Star Game champions

Atlantic All-Stars

Most Valuable Player
(United States) Antonio Ballard

Starters:			Pts	Reb	Ast
PG	12	(United States) Anthony Anderson	21	9	12
SG	8	(United States) Nick Okorie	22	4	4
SF	5	(United States) Antonio Ballard	39	10	6
PF	23	(United States) Johnny Mayhane	27	4	9
C	42	(United States) Tim Parham	15	17	3
Reserves:					
SF	2	(Canada) Olu Famutimi	12	2	3
PG	20	(United States) Cliff Clinkscales	4	2	15
PG	21	(United States) Doug Herring	12	5	8
PF	30	(Canada) Cordell Jeanty	4	7	2
PF	33	(Canada) Dwayne Smith	14	2	0
Head coach:
(United States) Joe Salerno
