= Dane Smith (basketball) =

Canadian basketball player

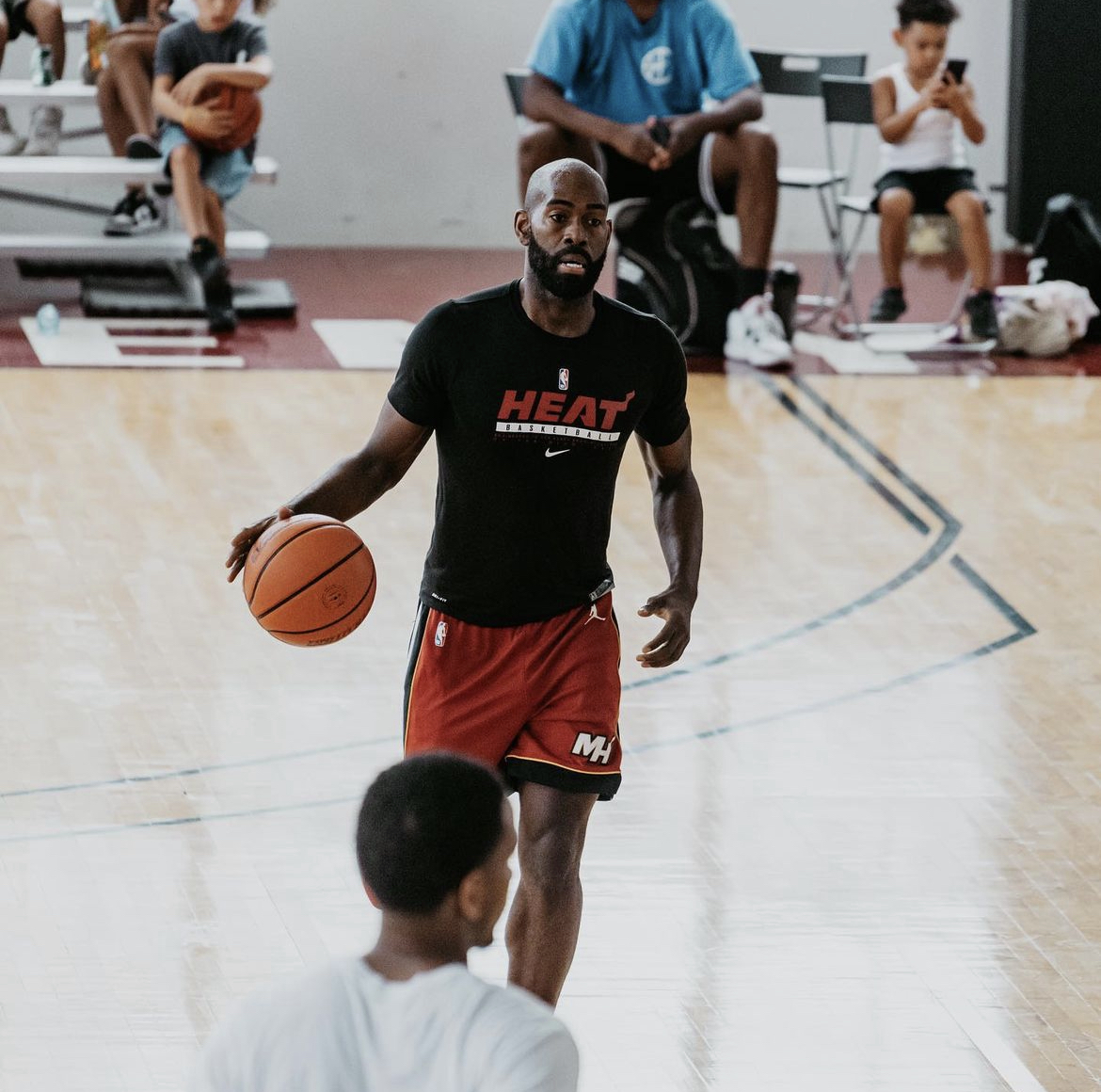
- Dane Smith playing in an open run

Personal information
- Born: March 28, 1989 (age 37) Toronto, Ontario, Canada
- Listed height: 6 ft 3 in (1.91 m)
- Listed weight: 185 lb (84 kg)

Career information
- High school: West Hill (Toronto, Ontario)
- College: Kilgore (2008–2010); UT Martin (2010–2012)
- NBA draft: 2012: undrafted
- Playing career: 2012–2019
- Position: Point guard
- Number: 3

Career history
- 2012–2013: London Lightning
- 2013–2015: Saint John Mill Rats
- 2015: UBC Muiscas
- 2016–2019: Cape Breton Highlanders

Career highlights
- NBL Canada champion (2013); 2× Nike Crown League champion (2015, 2018); 2× OVO Bounce champion (2015, 2017)

Dane Smith (born March 28, 1989) is a Canadian former professional basketball player who last played for the Cape Breton Highlanders of the National Basketball League of Canada (NBL). He has spent most of his career with the Saint John Mill Rats and the London Lightning. The Lightning won the league championship in Smith's rookie year in the 2013 NBL Canada Finals. He also competed with Colombian club UBC Muiscas in 2015. Smith is the author of Everything Being Said With No Words: Memoir Of A True Canadian Great.

== College career ==
Smith played junior college basketball at Kilgore College in Texas under Brian Hoberecht for the 2008–10 season. After graduating from Kilgore College, his love for basketball continued to grow and he continued to train even harder. Smith later transferred to play for the University of Tennessee at Martin, in the Ohio Valley Conference of the NCAA Division I, from 2010 to 2012. As a senior, he started in 29 games.

== Professional career ==
In his rookie season, Smith signed with the London Lightning of the NBL Canada and played one season under head coach Micheal Ray Richardson. At training camp, he competed with fellow Canadian guards Tyler Murray and Josh Whyte for a roster spot. The team won the 2013 NBL Canada Finals over the Summerside Storm.

== Personal life ==
Smith began playing basketball at an early age, which was encouraged by friends and family while growing up. Along with his twin brother Dwayne Smith, Dane is one of the many basketball players from the Jungle/Lawerence Heights community who have gone on to compete in University. His mother, Monica, is Jamaican and his father, Tyrone, is Jamaican. In 2019, Smith became engaged to Nehnika Williams. Their, daughter, Kalliyah N. Smith was born on April 2, 2018. Smith resides in Toronto.

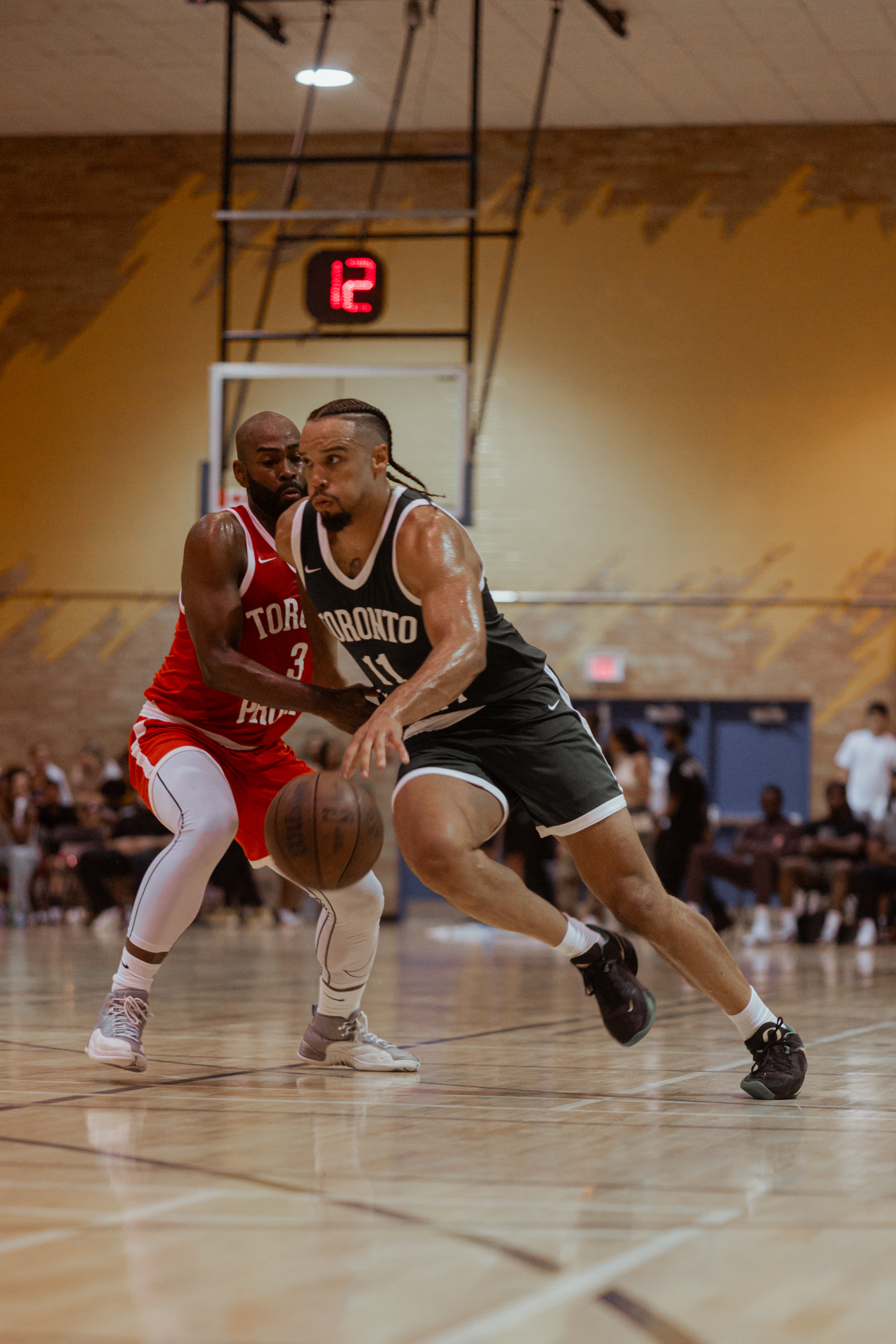
Dane Smith playing against Houston Rocket Guard Dillon Brooks
