= Tyrone Levett =

American basketball player

Grambling State Tigers
- Position: Assistant coach
- League: Southwestern Athletic Conference

Personal information
- Born: February 5, 1980 (age 46) Notasulga, Alabama, U.S.
- Listed height: 6 ft 5 in (1.96 m)
- Listed weight: 220 lb (100 kg)

Career information
- High school: Notasulga (Notasulga, Alabama)
- College: Alabama State (1998–2002)
- NBA draft: 2002: undrafted
- Playing career: 2002–2017
- Coaching career: 2018–present

Career history

Playing
- 2002–2003: Gleneagle Lakers
- 2004: Kentucky Reach
- 2004–2005: Oberwaltersdorf Comets
- 2005: Southern Crescent Lightning
- 2005–2006: UKJ SUBA Sankt Pölten
- 2006–2007: Vermont Frost Heaves
- 2007–2008: AD Vagos
- 2008–2009: Jämtland Basket
- 2009–2010: Niigata Albirex BB
- 2010–2011: LF Basket Norrbotten
- 2011: London Lightning
- 2011–2013: Halifax Rainmen
- 2013–2017: Saint John Mill Rats

Coaching
- 2018–2026: Alabama State (assistant)
- 2026–present: Grambling State (associate)

Career highlights
- NBL Canada All-Star (2012); Portuguese League All-Star (2008); ABA champion (2007); Austrian League All-Star (2005); Second-team All-WBA (2004); Second-team All-SWAC (2002)

Tyrone "Ty" Levett (born February 5, 1980) is an American basketball coach and former player who is currently an associate head coach at Grambling State.

== Playing career ==
Levett has competed in several different professional teams outside of the United States, including clubs from Sweden and Austria. Levett played college basketball at Alabama State before taking part in workouts for the Miami Heat and Detroit Pistons of the National Basketball Association (NBA). In Canada, he became one of the league's all-time top scorers. Although he primarily played the small forward position, Levett was also capable of assuming the role of a point guard, shooting guard, and power forward.

== Coaching career ==
Levett returned to Alabama State in the summer of 2018 as an assistant coach.
