= 2014 NBL Canada Finals =

- League: NBL Canada
- Sport: Basketball
- Duration: April 4–17, 2014
- Teams: 2

Finals
- Champions: Windsor Express
- Runners-up: Island Storm
- Finals MVP: Stefan Bonneau

NBL Canada Finals seasons
- ← 2013 2015 →

The 2014 NBL Canada Finals was the championship series of the 2013–14 National Basketball League of Canada season and the conclusion of the season's playoffs. The Central Division champions Windsor Express played against the Atlantic Division champions Island Storm, in a best-of-seven series. The Windsor Express won the series 4–3. The Finals began on April 4, and ended on April 17. The Express claimed their first title ever and Stefan Bonneau was named Finals MVP.

== Series ==
All times are in Eastern Daylight Time (UTC-4)

=== Game 1 ===
April 4

Box score

Island Storm 100, Windsor Express 122
Scoring by quarter: 23–27, 23–32, 27–26, 27–37
Pts: Nick Okorie 17; Rebs: Antonio Ballard 10; Asts: Adrian Moss 10	Pts: Darren Duncan 26; Rebs: Chris Commons 10; Asts: Darren Duncan 11
Windsor leads series, 1–0

WFCU Centre, Windsor, Ontario
Attendance: 1925

=== Game 2 ===
April 6

Box score

Island Storm 104, Windsor Express 102
Scoring by quarter: 16–34, 31–21, 33–20, 24–27
Pts: Nick Okorie 31; Rebs: Antonio Ballard 10; Asts: Adrian Moss, Nick Okorie 6	Pts: Stefan Bonneau, Julius Brooks 34; Rebs: DeAndre Thomas 9 Asts: Stefan Bonneau, Julius Brooks 8
Island ties series, 1–1

WFCU Centre, Windsor, Ontario
Attendance: 1535

=== Game 3 ===
April 9

Box score

Windsor Express 104, Island Storm 129
Scoring by quarter: 33–32, 15–36, 32–29, 24–32
Pts: DeAndre Thomas 26; Rebs: Chris Commons 13; Asts: Darren Duncan 11	Pts: Antonio Ballard 35; Rebs: Antonio Ballard, Jeremy Williams 13; Asts: Al Stewart 10
Island leads series, 2–1

Eastlink Centre, Charlottetown
Attendance: 1940

=== Game 4 ===
April 11

Box score

Windsor Express 103, Island Storm 104
Scoring by quarter: 26–22, 18–23, 27–27, 32–32
Pts: Stefan Bonneau, Julius Brooks 34; Rebs: Quinnel Brown 9 Asts: Darren Duncan 7	Pts: Nick Okorie 31; Rebs: Antonio Ballard, Jeremy Williams 8 Asts: Nick Okorie 8
Island leads series, 3–1

Eastlink Centre, Charlottetown
Attendance: 2220

=== Game 5 ===
April 12

Box score

Windsor Express 113, Island Storm 111
Scoring by quarter: 24–20, 33–25, 28–21, 28–45
Pts: Stefan Bonneau, Julius Brooks 39; Rebs: Quinnel Brown 12; Asts: Darren Duncan 6	Pts: Nick Okorie 31; Rebs: Antonio Ballard, Jeremy Williams, Dwayne Smith, Steve Tchiengang 8 Asts: Nick Okorie, Jeremy Williams 4
Island leads series, 3–2

Eastlink Centre, Charlottetown
Attendance: 3002

=== Game 6 ===
April 15

Box score

Island Storm 88, Windsor Express 107
Scoring by quarter: 15–22, 17–26, 20–28, 36–31
Pts: Nick Okorie 23; Rebs: Antonio Ballard 9 Asts: Adrian Moss, Al Stewart 4	Pts: Chris Commons 19; Rebs: Stefan Bonneau, Julius Brooks 9 Asts: Darren Duncan 12
Windsor ties series, 3–3

WFCU Centre, Windsor, Ontario
Attendance: 2109

=== Game 7 ===
April 15

Box score

Island Storm 106, Windsor Express 121
Scoring by quarter: 24–32, 17–32, 22–30, 43–27
Pts: Nick Okorie 30; Rebs: Antonio Ballard, Dwayne Smith 9 Asts: Nick Okorie 8	Pts: Stefan Bonneau, Julius Brooks 32; Rebs: Darren Duncan, DeAndre Thomas 11; Asts: Darren Duncan 16
Windsor wins series, 4–3

WFCU Centre, Windsor, Ontario
Attendance: 3470
