= Hefei Storm =

- League: National Basketball League
- History: Jianghuai Lightning (2016); Fujian Lightning (2017–2018); Anhui PutianXingfa (2019–2020); Fujian Son of the Wind (2021–2022); Hefei Storm (2023–present)

The Hefei Storm, (Chinese: 合肥狂风) is a Chinese professional men's basketball club based in Putian, Fujian, playing in the National Basketball League (NBL). Before 2017 the team was based in Chuzhou, Anhui.

== Current roster ==
2018 Fujian Lightning roster
Players
Coaches

Pos.	No.	Nat.	Name	Ht.	Wt.
C	1	(United States)	Amir Williams	2.11 m (6 ft 11 in)	110 kg (243 lb)
F	6	(China)	Liu Haoyuan	1.91 m (6 ft 3 in)	75 kg (165 lb)
G	7	(China)	Zhang Xiaobo	1.88 m (6 ft 2 in)	81 kg (179 lb)
F	8	(China)	Yang Wenbo	1.95 m (6 ft 5 in)	90 kg (198 lb)
F	10	(China)	Xin Huajun	2.02 m (6 ft 8 in)	92 kg (203 lb)
G	11	(China)	Wang Zilong	1.90 m (6 ft 3 in)	81 kg (179 lb)
G	12	(China)	Fu Kaipeng	1.85 m (6 ft 1 in)	70 kg (154 lb)
G	14	(United States)	Antoine Mason	1.91 m (6 ft 3 in)	93 kg (205 lb)
F	15	(China)	He Ze	1.98 m (6 ft 6 in)	93 kg (205 lb)
C	16	(China)	Niu Baoping	2.00 m (6 ft 7 in)	90 kg (198 lb)
C	21	(China)	Niu Baoshun	2.00 m (6 ft 7 in)	94 kg (207 lb)
G	25	(China)	Zhang Shu	1.92 m (6 ft 4 in)	76 kg (168 lb)

Head coach

- (China) Li Kaihua

Legend

- (C) Team captain
- Injured

== Notable players ==
- (United States) Brandon Bowman
- (United States) Stephan Hicks
