= Taliek Brown =

American basketball player

St. John's Red Storm
- Title: Assistant coach
- League: Big East Conference

Personal information
- Born: June 23, 1982 (age 44)
- Listed height: 6 ft 1 in (1.85 m)
- Listed weight: 195 lb (88 kg)

Career information
- High school: St. John's Prep (Queens, New York)
- College: UConn (2000–2004)
- NBA draft: 2004: undrafted
- Playing career: 2004–2013
- Position: Point guard
- Coaching career: 2019–present

Career history

Playing
- 2004–2005: Idaho Stampede
- 2005–2006: Karşıyaka Basket
- 2006: Cibona
- 2006–2007: Lukoil Academic
- 2007: Atlanta Krunk
- 2008–2009: Feni Industries
- 2011–2012: Halifax Rainmen
- 2012–2013: Moncton Miracles

Coaching
- 2019–2022: UConn (dir. of player development)
- 2022–2023: Iona (assistant)
- 2023–present: St. John's (assistant)

Career highlights
- NBL Canada All-Star (2012); NCAA champion (2004); McDonald's All-American (2000); Second-team Parade All-American (2000)

Taliek Brown (born June 23, 1982) is an American former professional basketball player and current assistant coach for the St. John's Red Storm.

== High school career ==
Brown played high school basketball at St. John's Preparatory School in Astoria, Queens, New York. He averaged 22.5 points and 6.6 assists per game as a senior. A Parade All-American, Brown was ranked among the top 25 high school recruits in the United States and was chosen to play at the 2000 McDonald's All-American Game and at the Roundball Classic All-Star game, after which he was named Most Valuable Player. As a McDonald's All-American, he recorded 11 points, 6 assists and 4 rebounds.

== College career ==
Brown played college basketball with Connecticut because of "their winning tradition, the great players they had come through here, and just the whole total UConn. This is a big program."

As a freshman, Brown was the starting point guard in all 32 of UConn's games. He scored a season-high 21 points against the nationally ranked Boston College on February 13, 2001, and recorded a season-best 12 assists in an overtime win over St. John's on January 6. After his second season, Brown was averaging 9.2 points and 5.1 assists per game. He recorded the second-most assists for a sophomore in college history, scoring 172. At the 2002 Big East men's basketball tournament championship, he made a half-court shot at the closing seconds to seal the game against the Pittsburgh Panthers. Brown led UConn to an NCAA Division I Basketball title in 2004, as his team defeated the Georgia Tech Yellow Jackets to close his senior season.

== Professional career ==
After leaving UConn, Brown performed workouts for the 2004 NBA draft, but was undrafted.
