= Ta'Quan Zimmerman =

American basketball player (born 1991)

Cape Breton Highlanders
- Position: Shooting guard
- League: NBL Canada

Personal information
- Born: December 2, 1991 (age 34) Waterbury, Connecticut, U.S.
- Listed height: 6 ft 2 in (1.88 m)
- Listed weight: 200 lb (91 kg)

Career information
- High school: Holy Cross (Waterbury, Connecticut); Putnam Science Academy (Putnam, Connecticut)
- College: LIU (2010); Southeastern CC (2011); Monroe CC (2012–2013); Thompson Rivers (2013–2014)
- NBA draft: 2014: undrafted
- Playing career: 2014–present

Career history
- 2014–2015: Idaho Stampede
- 2016–2018: Halifax Hurricanes
- 2018–present: Cape Breton Highlanders

Career highlights
- NBL Canada Sixth Man of the Year (2018); First-team All-Canada West (2014)

Ta'Quan Zimmerman (born December 2, 1991) is an American professional basketball player. He signed with NCAA division 1 Long Island University (NEC) before finishing up his college career in Canada at Thompson Rivers University. After his time at Thompson Rivers University, Zimmerman entered the 2014 NBA draft. Zimmerman did not get drafted making him an unrestricted free agent, but then was later signed by NBA Utah Jazz. Zimmerman spent 2 years with their G-League team Salt Lake City Stars.

== High school career ==
In 2009, Zimmerman graduated from Holy Cross High School in Waterbury, Connecticut. After not receiving any scholarship offers, he enrolled at Putnam Science Academy, an all-boys boarding school in northeast Connecticut. Facing tough competition against New England prep schools, Zimmerman excelled. He set the school record with 24 points per game and attracted interest from several mid-major Division 1 colleges. However, Zimmerman didn't qualify academically, limiting his options.

== College career ==
In the fall of 2010, Zimmerman headed to Long Island University as a walk on, where he had to pay his own tuition, room and board. He worked out with the team and planned on playing for the Blackbirds in 2011–12. During a team scrimmage, he felt his left knee buckle, an injury that was later determined to be a torn left meniscus. He subsequently returned home to recover from the injury after undergoing surgery.

As a result, Zimmerman did not join Long Island in 2011–12. Instead, he joined Southeastern Community College in West Burlington, Iowa, but his stint lasted just a few months. In December 2011, ten players were dismissed from the school after getting caught breaking into an on-campus store, while two others were declared academically ineligible. With Zimmerman now one of only two players remaining on the roster, the team were forced to forfeit the final 12 games of the season.

The following summer, Zimmerman received a call from Jerry Burns, the coach at Monroe Community College (MCC) in Rochester, New York. At MCC, Zimmerman started at shooting guard during the 2012–13 season, and averaged 10.1 points, 5.9 rebounds and 3.3 assists per game while shooting 39.7% from the floor and 25.6% on three-pointers. MCC's team finished 32–4 and fifth in the nation among Division 2 community colleges. Zimmerman made the second-team All-Region squad and left a positive impression.

With his United States college eligibility now over, Zimmerman moved north to Canada for a year at Thompson Rivers University in Kamloops, British Columbia. He played for the WolfPack in 2013–14 and quickly adjusted to a new system and Canadian college rules. He finished second in the 16-team Canada West conference in scoring (19.6 points per game) and three-point percentage (44.9%). Thompson Rivers went 13–9 and advanced to the postseason for the first time in its history. While another year at Thompson Rivers was on the cards, Zimmerman chose instead to declare for the 2014 NBA draft.

== Professional career ==
Zimmerman was considered an outside chance of being selected in the second-round of the 2014 NBA draft, but ultimately went undrafted as many had predicted. With his NBA dream on hold, he entered the NBA Development League player pool in November, and on November 26, he was acquired by the Idaho Stampede. He spent the rest of the 2014–15 season with the Stampede, and in 41 games (16 starts), he averaged 4.2 points, 2.0 rebounds and 2.1 assists in 19.9 minutes per game.

On November 1, 2015, Zimmerman was reacquired by the Stampede. On December 31, 2015, he was waived by the Stampede. He managed just six games for the team in 2015–16, averaging 4.8 points, 1.5 rebounds and 1.2 assists in 12.5 minutes per game.

On September 15, 2018, Zimmerman signed with the Cape Breton Highlanders of the NBL Canada.

== Personal ==
Zimmerman has two older brothers, Tyrell and Duval, both of whom play American football.
