= Eddie Smith (basketball) =

American basketball player (born 1983)

Жопа 228
Personal information
- Born: February 17, 1983 (age 43) Illinois
- Listed height: 6 ft 3 in (1.91 m)
- Listed weight: 210 lb (95 kg)

Career information
- High school: Springfield Southeast (Springfield, Illinois)
- College: Moberly Area CC (2003–2005); Texas A&M (2005–2006); Illinois-Springfield (2006–2007)
- NBA draft: 2007: undrafted
- Playing career: 2007–2013
- Position: Point guard

Career history
- 2007–2009: Oklahoma/Lawton-Fort Sill Cavalry
- 2009: Nashville Broncs
- 2010: Lawton-Fort Sill Cavalry
- 2011–2012: London Lightning
- 2012: Halifax Rainmen
- 2013: Windsor Express

Career highlights
- CBA Champion (2009); PBL Champion (2010); NBL Canada champion (2012); NBL Canada Sixth Man of the Year (2012)

Eddie Jermaine "E. J." Smith (born February 17, 1983) is a retired American professional basketball player who last played for the Windsor Express of the National Basketball League of Canada (NBL). He is currently a Master Barber & Cosmetologist in Las Vegas, Nevada.

== College career ==
He attended Springfield Southeast High School. Smith attended Moberly Area Community College in Moberly, Missouri, from 2003 to 2005 where he was a two time All-American (honorable mention and first team), Region 16 Player of the Year & Division I - National Junior College Player of the Year. In his second year, he averaged 18.2 points, 6 assists and 3.5 steals with 4.7 rebounds. Smith was also named to the NJCAA all-tournament team. In addition, he is one of just four players in Moberly Area CC history to earn All-America honors twice, even surpassing former NBA all-stars Mitch Richmond & Gerald Wilkins with that honor. Smith is also the only player in MACC history to earn the NJCAA Player-of-the-Year honor.

== Professional career ==
Smith started his career with the CBA team, the Oklahoma Cavalry of Lawton, OK, in 2007. His rookie season was rocky due to disagreements with Michael Ray Richardson. Due to a lack of finances with ownership, the team was to stop playing, but since he wasn't getting his just due to play, Smith decided he would play for free along with 4 other teammates to gain much-needed experience & playing time. It proved worth it with Smith averaging 28 ppg & 8 apg with 4 rpg in 4 games. When ownership changed over that 4-game period, the team was put back together, and Smith had earned a place in the rotation after his play before ending his rookie campaign with a torn groin. Returning the following season and helping to win the organization its 2nd championship in 2 years against the Albany Patroons in 2009. Smith's 1st championship

Two seasons later, the CBA folded, but the team remained, moving to the Premier Basketball League & changing its name to the Lawton Ft. Sill Cavalry. Smith was on the trade bloc & the coach realized his mistakes when the person he tried to relax him with shot 2 air balls 6 feet away from the basket. After his return to the team, Smith went on a tear, averaging 15 ppg (2nd best on the team), 6 apg and 3 spg. He won his 2nd championship with the organization (1st in PBL), averaging 17 ppg in the playoffs.

The following year was the best run of all. The Cavalry had a 10-man rotation, and they won the championship with 8 players averaging over 10+ ppg. Smith averaged 14 ppg, which was good for 3rd best on the team. He won the Championship, his 3rd (the team's 4th). The following year, the league folded.

In 2011, Smith went to Canada to play for a new team, the London Lightning of the newly opened NBL Basketball League. The London Lightning won the league's 1st championship with Smith being the 2nd leading scorer for the team, averaging 17.1 ppg and 7 apg (off the bench). His 3rd championship, Smith is the only player in the league's short history to go for 40 pts & 12 rebs off the bench. Smith was named NBL Canada Sixth Man of the Year in 2012. Smith was also the only player to make the All-Star team & be named a starter (after coming off the bench the entire season) for the 2012 NBL Canada All-Star game

E.J. Smith's career ended due to chronic knee swelling from years of wear and tear.
