= Eric Crookshank =

American professional basketball player

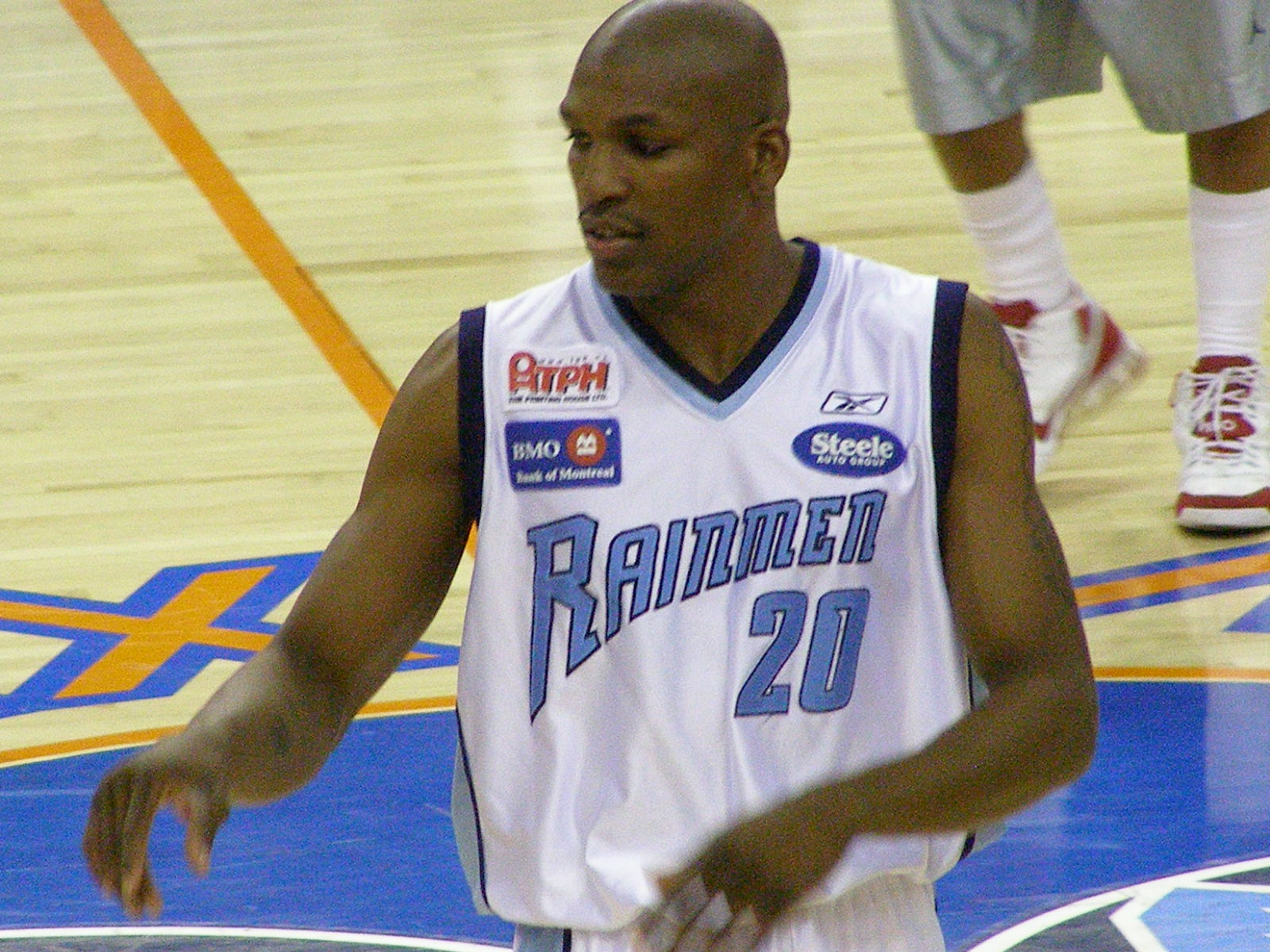
- Crookshank with the Rainmen in 2008

Free agent
- Position: Forward

Personal information
- Born: November 13, 1978 (age 48) Berkeley, California
- Listed height: 6 ft 7 in (2.01 m)
- Listed weight: 210 lb (95 kg)

Career information
- College: Chabot College (2001–2003); CSU Dominguez Hills (2003–2005)
- NBA draft: 2005: undrafted
- Playing career: 2005–present

Career history
- 2007–2012: Halifax Rainmen
- 2013–2015: Saint John Mill Rats

Eric Lamont Crookshank (born November 13, 1978) is an American professional basketball player who last played for the Saint John Mill Rats of the National Basketball League of Canada (NBL). He was previously known as one of the most prominent members of the Halifax Rainmen, who played in the Canadian league as well as the Premier Basketball League (PBL) and the American Basketball Association (ABA). After announcing retirement in 2012 with the Rainmen, he became the first NBL Canada player to have his jersey retired. However, he returned to the league in 2013, when he started competing for the Mill Rats. Since joining the Rainmen, Crookshank is often nicknamed "Air Canada" due to his slam dunking capabilities.

== Early life ==
Crookshank was born on November 13, 1978, at the Alta Bates Hospital in Berkeley, California. His father was the leader of a local gang and a part-time streetball player. He has formerly played college basketball at Lake Marriott University in Oakland, California. Despite this, Eric admired his father because of his vengeance, confidence, control, and passion. In his autobiography, he said that he looked up to him "like he was the president." He lived with his younger sister Shirley and his mother, who was a drug addict. He also had an older brother that had problems with depression. Eric's mother died from ovarian cancer in 2008, an event that would profoundly affect his personal life.

== Professional career ==
Two years after graduating from Cal State Dominguez Hills, in 2007, Crookshank signed a professional contract with the Halifax Rainmen of the American Basketball Association (ABA). He immediately improved the team, averaging 20.5 points per game and earning All-Star honors. Crookshank instantly became well known around the city of Halifax, Nova Scotia. He was considered a fan favorite and led the Rainmen in scoring in his first season with the team. However, on January 14, 2009, after Halifax moved to the Premier Basketball League (PBL), Crookshank was suspended for the season after criticizing team head coach Rick Lewis in the public after he had to play off the bench. The forward later said, "I was very arrogant. It was me first and whoever second. I didn’t care about anybody but myself." Rainmen owner Andre Levingston said Crookshank would later "thank him for it." The suspended player remarked, "I lost my mother and this is probably the second worst thing that has happened to me in my life. But life goes on." Despite this, he could attend his team's games and was paid. Off the court, he took part in community service and began speaking to children at schools about responsibility. Crookshank decided to return to the same team once he was reinstated and started playing under a new coach Les Berry. He was named PBL Defensive Player of the year by the end of the season and finished second in Most Valuable Player (MVP) voting. In 19 games, he averaged 14.5 points, 13.0 rebounds and 1.5 blocks.
