= Jamal Branch =

American professional basketball player

Personal information
- Born: September 30, 1992 (age 33) Kansas City, Missouri, U.S.
- Listed height: 6 ft 3 in (1.91 m)
- Listed weight: 170 lb (77 kg)

Career information
- High school: Atascocita (Humble, Texas); Grace Preparatory Academy (Arlington, Texas)
- College: Texas A&M (2011–2012); St. John's (2012–2015)
- NBA draft: 2015: undrafted
- Playing career: 2015–present
- Position: Point guard / shooting guard

Career history
- 2015–2016: Los Angeles D-Fenders
- 2016–2017: Reno Bighorns
- 2018–2019: Cape Breton Highlanders

Jamal Edward Branch (born September 30, 1992) is an American professional basketball player who last played for the Cape Breton Highlanders of the National Basketball League of Canada. He played college basketball for Texas A&M and St. John's.

== High school career ==
Branch attended Atascocita High School before transferring to Grace Preparatory Academy. As a senior, he averaged 16.4 points, 7.0 rebounds and 4.0 assists, leading Grace Prep to the state championship. For his efforts, he was selected as the district's most valuable player, he was an all-state selection and was a finalist for Mr. Basketball in the state of Texas.

== College career ==
Branch began his college career at Texas A&M where he played in 11 games and averaged 4.2 points, 2.5 assists and 2.2 rebounds in 18.6 minutes. Before his sophomore season, he transferred to St. John's where he averaged 4.8 points 2.5 rebounds and 2.4 assists in 22 minutes per game as a senior.

== Professional career ==
=== Los Angeles D-Fenders (2015–2016) ===
After going undrafted in the 2015 NBA draft, Branch signed with Iskra Svit of the Slovak Extraliga on August 29, 2015, but left before playing for them. On October 31, Branch was selected by the Los Angeles D-Fenders with the 41st overall pick in the 2015 NBA Development League Draft. However, he was waived by the D-Fenders on January 6, 2016. In 10 games with the D-Fenders, he averaged 1.1 points in 6.4 minutes per game. On April 7, 2016, Branch was re-signed by the D-Fenders for the D-League playoffs.

=== Reno Bighorns (2016–2017) ===
On October 30, 2016, Branch was acquired by the Reno Bighorns in a draft-day trade with the D-Fenders. On February 28, 2017, Branch was waived by the Bighorns.

== The Basketball Tournament ==
Jamal Branch played for Team Johnnies in the 2018 edition of The Basketball Tournament. He scored 24 points and had 4 rebounds and 2 steals in the team's first-round loss to the Golden Eagles.

== Personal life ==
The son of Schamauda Thompson and Jerome Branch, he has two sisters, Karissa Couty and Jayda Branch, and two brothers, William Mason and Justin Branch. He also is the cousin of Alec Burks of the Utah Jazz and Marcus Denmon of Gaziantep Basketbol. Branch majored in sports management. He now resides in the DFW metroplex with his wife.
