= Antoine Mason =

American basketball player (born 1992)

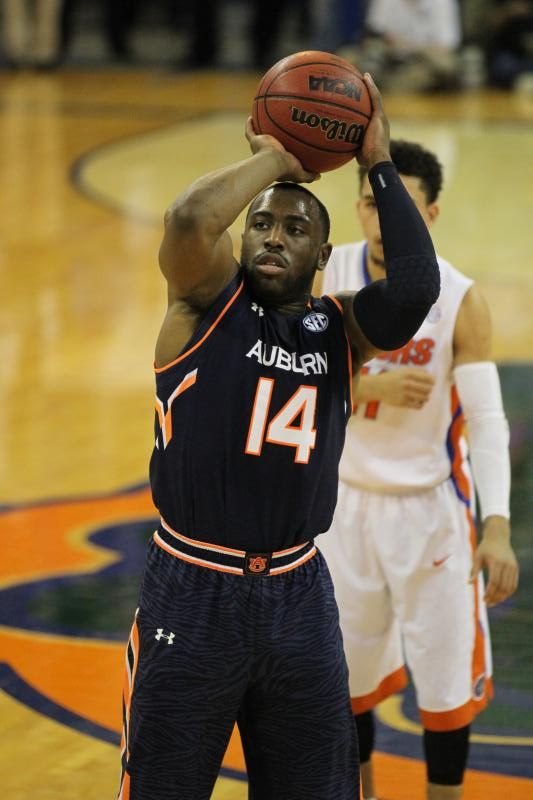
- Mason shooting for Auburn in 2015

No. 15 – KW Titans
- Position: Guard
- League: Basketball Super League

Personal information
- Born: May 24, 1992 (age 34) Queens, New York, U.S.
- Listed height: 6 ft 2 in (1.88 m)
- Listed weight: 209 lb (95 kg)

Career information
- High school: New Rochelle (New Rochelle, New York)
- College: Niagara (2010–2014); Auburn (2014–2015)
- NBA draft: 2015: undrafted
- Playing career: 2015–present

Career history
- 2015–2016: Apollon Limassol
- 2016–2018: Halifax Hurricanes
- 2018: Fujian Lightning
- 2019–2020: Halifax Hurricanes
- 2020–2021: CB Ciudad de Valladolid
- 2021–2022: Al Wehdat
- 2024: Montreal Tundra
- 2024–2025: London Lightning
- 2025-present: KW Titans

Career highlights
- NBL Canada Sixth Man of the Year (2017); 2× First-team All-MAAC (2013, 2014); MAAC All-Rookie team (2012)

Antoine Mason (born May 24, 1992) is an American basketball player for KW Titans of the Basketball Super League. He spent his first three years of college eligibility at Niagara University. He then transferred to Auburn University. Mason went undrafted in the 2015 NBA draft and subsequently signed with Apollon Limassol in Cyprus.

== Early life ==
Mason was born in Queens, New York, in 1992. He is the son of late former NBA player Anthony Mason and Latifa Whitlock Mason. He has one brother, Anthony Jr.

Mason attended New Rochelle High School and was named the school's athlete of the year as a senior.

== College career ==
Mason joined Niagara as a freshman in 2010–11. He played in three games before suffering a foot injury that ended his season. The following year, he started every game and was named to the MAAC All-Rookie team.

In 2012–13, Mason scored 18.7 points per game to rank second in the MAAC. He was named to the All-MAAC first team and the MAAC All-Tournament team. As of March 8, 2014, he was averaging 25.6 points per game to rank second in NCAA Division I.

On May 21, 2014, and upon the conclusion of his redshirt junior season, he announced that he would be transferring for the 2014–15 season. The NCAA did not make him wait a season for transferring since he had already earned his undergraduate degree.

On December 23, 2014, Mason scored his 2,000th career point in a 61–60 win over Texas Southern.

== Professional career ==
After going undrafted in the 2015 NBA draft, Mason signed with Apollon Limassol of the Cypriot League.

On October 31, 2016, Mason signed with the Rio Grande Valley Vipers of the NBA Development League, but was waived on November 10 before playing a game for the team. In the 2017–18 season, he played with the Halifax Hurricanes of NBL Canada and averaged 20.3 points, 4.6 rebounds and 2.5 assists per game. Mason was named to the Second Team All-NBLC.

On June 3, 2018, Mason signed with the Fujian Lightning in China. He rejoined Halifax in December 2019. Mason averaged 25.7 points, 5.6 rebounds, and 2.5 assists per game, earning First Team All-NBL Canada honors. On July 22, 2020, he signed with CB Ciudad de Valladolid of the LEB Oro. Mason averaged 11.9 points, 2.6 rebounds, and 1.4 assists per game. On November 22, 2021, he signed with Al Wehdat of the Jordanian Premier Basketball League.

=== The Basketball Tournament ===
In 2017, Mason played for The Washington Generals of The Basketball Tournament. Mason's team lost in the round of 64.

== Career statistics ==
=== Professional ===
Legend
GP	Games played	MPG	Minutes per game	FG%	Field goal percentage
3P%	3-point field goal percentage	FT%	Free throw percentage	RPG	Rebounds per game
APG	Assists per game	SPG	Steals per game	BPG	Blocks per game
PPG	Points per game	**Bold**	Career high		Led the league

Year	Team	League	GP	MPG	FG%	3P%	FT%	RPG	APG	SPG	BPG	PPG
2017–18	Halifax Hurricanes	NBL Canada	**51**	35.4	.431	**.308**	**.740**	4.7	2.6	1.1	**.1**	20.2
2018	Fujian Lightning	NBL China	25	**38.8**	**.483**	.263	.683	**6.5**	**2.8**	**1.6**	.0	**33.3**
2020–21	CB Ciudad de Valladolid	LEB Oro	25	25.3	.424	.185	.642	2.6	1.4	.7	.0	11.9
Career		All Leagues	101	33.8	.449	.278	.703	4.6	2.3	1.1	.1	21.4

=== College ===
All statistics per Sports Reference.

Year	Team	GP	GS	MPG	FG%	3P%	FT%	RPG	APG	SPG	BPG	PPG
2010–11	Niagara	3	3	34.7	.333	.261	.783	4.3	1.0	.7	**.3**	16.7
2011–12	Niagara	**33**	**33**	34.3	.382	.273	.648	**4.6**	**2.1**	**1.2**	.1	15.1
2012–13	Niagara	29	29	36.3	**.441**	.315	**.794**	4.1	1.5	1.1	.2	18.7
2013–14	Niagara	**33**	**33**	**37.6**	.440	.286	.728	3.6	1.5	**1.2**	.2	**25.6**
2014–15	Auburn	26	21	28.9	.417	**.402**	.727	2.4	1.0	1.0	.0	14.4
Career		124	119	34.5	.419	.311	.728	3.7	1.5	1.1	.1	18.6
