= 2013 NBL Canada Finals =

- League: NBL Canada
- Sport: Basketball
- Duration: April 6–12, 2013
- Teams: 2

Finals
- Champions: London Lightning
- Runners-up: Summerside Storm
- Finals MVP: Marvin Phillips

NBL Canada Finals seasons
- ← 2012 2014 →

The 2013 NBL Canada Finals was the championship series of the 2012–13 National Basketball League of Canada season and the conclusion of the season's playoffs. The Central Division champions London Lightning played against the Atlantic Division champions Summerside Storm, in a best-of-five series. The London Lightning the series 3–1. The Finals began on April 6, and ended on April 12. The Lightning claimed their second title in a row and Marvin Phillips was named Finals MVP.

== Series ==
All times are in Eastern Daylight Time (UTC-4)

=== Game 1 ===
April 6
7:00 pm

Box Score
Recap Archived 2013-10-28 at the Wayback Machine(subscription required)

London Lightning 105, Summerside Storm 100
Scoring by quarter: 30–23, 20–20, 28–24, 27–33
Pts: Marvin Phillips 25; Rebs: Tim Ellis, Marvin Phillips 12; Asts: DeAnthony Bowden 12	Pts: Antoine Tisby 28; Rebs: Omari Johnson 9 Asts: Al Stewart 5

Budweiser Gardens, London, Ontario
Attendance: 4,423

=== Game 2 ===
April 7
7:00 pm

Box Score
Recap Archived 2013-11-04 at the Wayback Machine(subscription required)

London Lightning 99, Summerside Storm 96
'Scoring by quarter: 19–19, 31–25, 21–28, 28–24
Pts: Adrian Moss 25; Rebs: Elvin Mims 10; Asts: DeAnthony Bowden 5	Pts: Josiah Turner 25; Rebs: Omari Johnson 14; Asts: Josiah Turner, Al Stewart 5

Budweiser Gardens, London, Ontario
Attendance: 3,406

=== Game 3 ===
April 10
7:00 pm

Box Score
Recap Archived 2013-10-07 at the Wayback Machine(subscription required)

Summerside Storm 111, London Lightning 99
Scoring by quarter: 25–19, 20–26, 40–28, 26–26
Pts: Omari Johnson 33; Rebs: Brandon Robinson 9 Asts: Josiah Turner 9	Pts: Tim Ellis 17; Rebs: Adrian Moss 6 Asts: DeAnthony Bowden 9

Consolidated Credit Union Place, Summerside, Prince Edward Island
Attendance: 2,582

=== Game 4 ===
April 12
7:00 pm

Box Score
Recap Archived 2013-10-07 at the Wayback Machine(subscription required)

Summerside Storm 80, London Lightning 87
Scoring by quarter: 22–8, 15–24, 17–18, 26–37
Pts: Brandon Robinson 24; Rebs: Gregory Plummer, Brandon Robinson 12; Asts: Royce Parran 8	Pts: Marvin Phillips 19; Rebs: Tim Ellis 13; Asts: Morgan Lewis 8

Consolidated Credit Union Place, Summerside, Prince Edward Island
Attendance: 3,019
