= DeAndre Thomas =

American basketball player (born 1986)

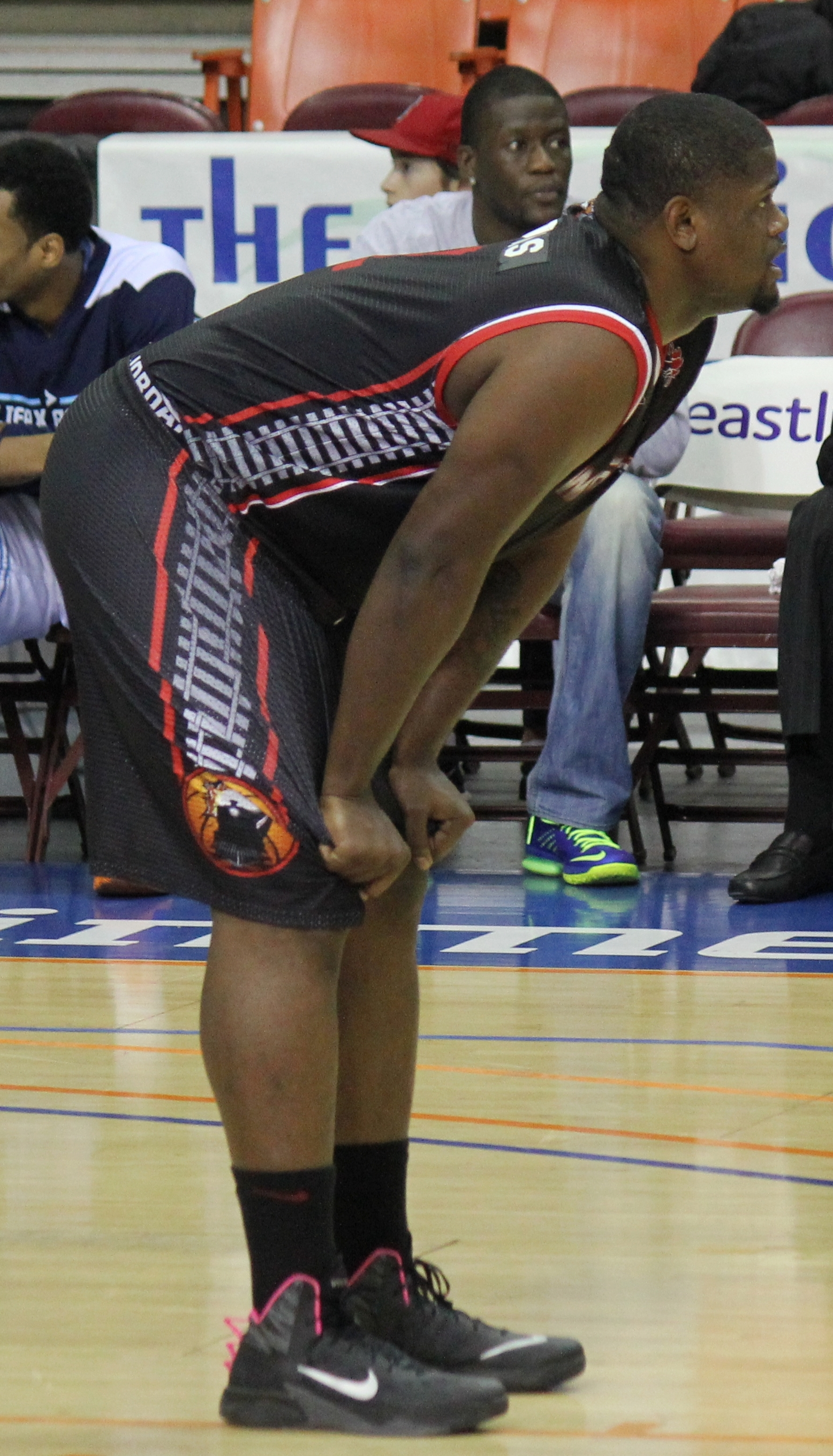
- Thomas with the Express in 2013

No. 5 – Windsor Express
- Position: Center
- League: NAPB

Personal information
- Born: September 20, 1986 (age 40)
- Listed height: 6 ft 8 in (2.03 m)
- Listed weight: 295 lb (134 kg)

Career information
- High school: Westinghouse (Chicago, Illinois)
- College: Chipola (2005–2007); Indiana (2007–2008); Robert Morris (Illinois) (2008–2009)
- NBA draft: 2009: undrafted
- Playing career: 2009–present

Career history
- 2009–2010: Albany Legends
- 2010–2011: Lawton-Fort Sill Cavalry
- 2011: Halifax Rainmen
- 2012: Chang Thailand Slammers
- 2012–2013: London Lightning
- 2013–2015: Windsor Express
- 2016–2017: Windsor Express
- 2018–present: London Lightning

Career highlights
- Second-team All-NBL Canada (2015); 2× IBL All-Star (2010, 2011); IBL Most Valuable Player (2010)

DeAndre "Cheesecake" Thomas (born September 28, 1986) is an American professional basketball player for the Albany Patroons of the North American Premier Basketball. He previously played for the London Lightning and the Windsor Express of the National Basketball League of Canada (NBL). He was released by the London Lightning on December 11, 2018. He was a prominent name in the International Basketball League, winning its Most Valuable Player award in 2010 as an Albany Legend. Thomas played college basketball at Chipola Junior College, Indiana, and Robert Morris University Illinois.
