= Calvin Tyler Scott =

Canadian basketball player

Calvin Tyler Scott, who goes by Tyler Scott (born March 10, 1992) is a Canadian professional basketball player for the NBL team Halifax Hurricanes. He was born and raised in Halifax, Nova Scotia, attended Halifax West High School and was the top scorer for the Halifax West Warriors. After graduating from Halifax West, Scott attended Lee Academy, a prep school in Maine. After Lee Academy, Scott enrolled at Acadia University in Wolfville, NS, where he averaged 11.7 points per game, but after realizing Acadia wasn't where he felt 100% comfortable he committed to UPEI with Tim Kendrick. At UPEI Scott went on to average 23 points per game in his first year and became a first team all-Canadian and during his second and third year at UPEI, Scott was named second team all-star and was 2nd in scoring in the AUS and 1st in scoring in his 5th year. On February 26, 2017, Scott made it into top 5 AUS scoring of all time. During his 5th year Scott also passed 1,700 career points. Scott was drafted by the Prince Edward Island Storm basketball team in the 2016-2017 National Basketball League of Canada draft.
