= Devin Sibley =

American basketball player (born 1996)

No. 4 – Island Storm
- Position: Point guard
- League: NBL Canada

Personal information
- Born: February 6, 1996 (age 30)
- Listed height: 6 ft 2 in (1.88 m)
- Listed weight: 208 lb (94 kg)

Career information
- High school: Karns (Knoxville, Tennessee)
- College: Furman (2014–2018)
- NBA draft: 2018: undrafted
- Playing career: 2018–present

Career history
- 2018: Köping Stars
- 2019: BC Titebi
- 2019–2020: Halifax Hurricanes
- 2020–2021: Island Storm

Career highlights
- AP Honorable Mention All-American (2017); SoCon Player of the Year (2017); 2× First-team All-SoCon (2017, 2018); SoCon Freshman of the Year (2015)

Devin Sibley (born February 6, 1996) was an American basketball player for Island Storm in the National Basketball League of Canada, the highest tier of basketball in Canada. He played college basketball for Furman.

== College career ==
In his freshman season in college, Sibley was named Southern Conference Freshman of the Year after averaging 10.1 points per game. On February 1, 2017, Sibley earned Lou Henson Award National Player of the Week honors after averaging 24.5 points in two games. As a junior he was named Southern conference player of the year. He averaged 17.3 points and 4.1 rebounds per game to lead Furman to a 21-10 regular season record and a share of the school's first regular season league title since 1991. As a senior, he was named first team all-SoCon. He averaged 14.2 points and 4.9 rebounds per game.

== Professional career ==
Sibley signed with the Swedish team Köping Stars in 2018. However, he left the team in December 2018. He joined the Georgian team BC Titebi in August 2019. Sibley signed with the Halifax Hurricanes of NBL Canada in December 2019. In February 2020, he joined the Island Storm.
