= Brandon Dean =

American racing driver (born 1987)

- Born: August 18, 1987 (age 39) Lancaster, South Carolina, U.S.

CARS Late Model Stock Tour career
- Debut season: 2026
- Years active: 2026–present
- Starts: 4
- Championships: 0
- Wins: 0
- Poles: 0
- Best finish: 41st in 2026
- Statistics up to date as of October 27, 2026.

Brandon Dean (born August 18, 1987) is an American professional stock car racing driver. He currently competes in the zMAX CARS Tour, driving the No. 99 Chevrolet/Ford for BDR 2.

Dean has also competed in series such as the IHRA Stock Car Series, the UARA STARS Late Model Series, the Dirty Dozen Series, and the NASCAR Local Racing Series, and is a former track champion at Motor Mile Speedway, having won it in 2010.

== Motorsports results ==
=== CARS Late Model Stock Car Tour ===
(key) (Bold – Pole position awarded by qualifying time. Italics – Pole position earned by points standings or practice time. * – Most laps led. ** – All laps led.)

CARS Late Model Stock Car Tour results
Year	Team	No.	Make	1	2	3	4	5	6	7	8	9	10	11	12	13	14	CLMSCTC	Pts	Ref
2026	BDR 2	99	Chevy	SNM; DNQ	WCS	NSV	CRW; Wth	ACE; 23	LGY	DOM	NWS							41st	79	
2026	BDR 2	99	Ford									HCY; 28	AND; 19	FLC; 29	TCM	NPS	SBO	41st	79	

=== IHRA Late Model Sportsman Series ===
(key) (Bold – Pole position awarded by qualifying time. Italics – Pole position earned by points standings or practice time. * – Most laps led. ** – All laps led.)

IHRA Late Model Sportsman Series
Year	Team	No.	Make	1	2	3	ISCSS	Pts	Ref
2026	BDR 2	99	N/A	DUB; 32	CDL; 23	AND; 24	21st	63	
