= Adrian Moss (basketball, born 1988) =

American basketball player (born 1988)

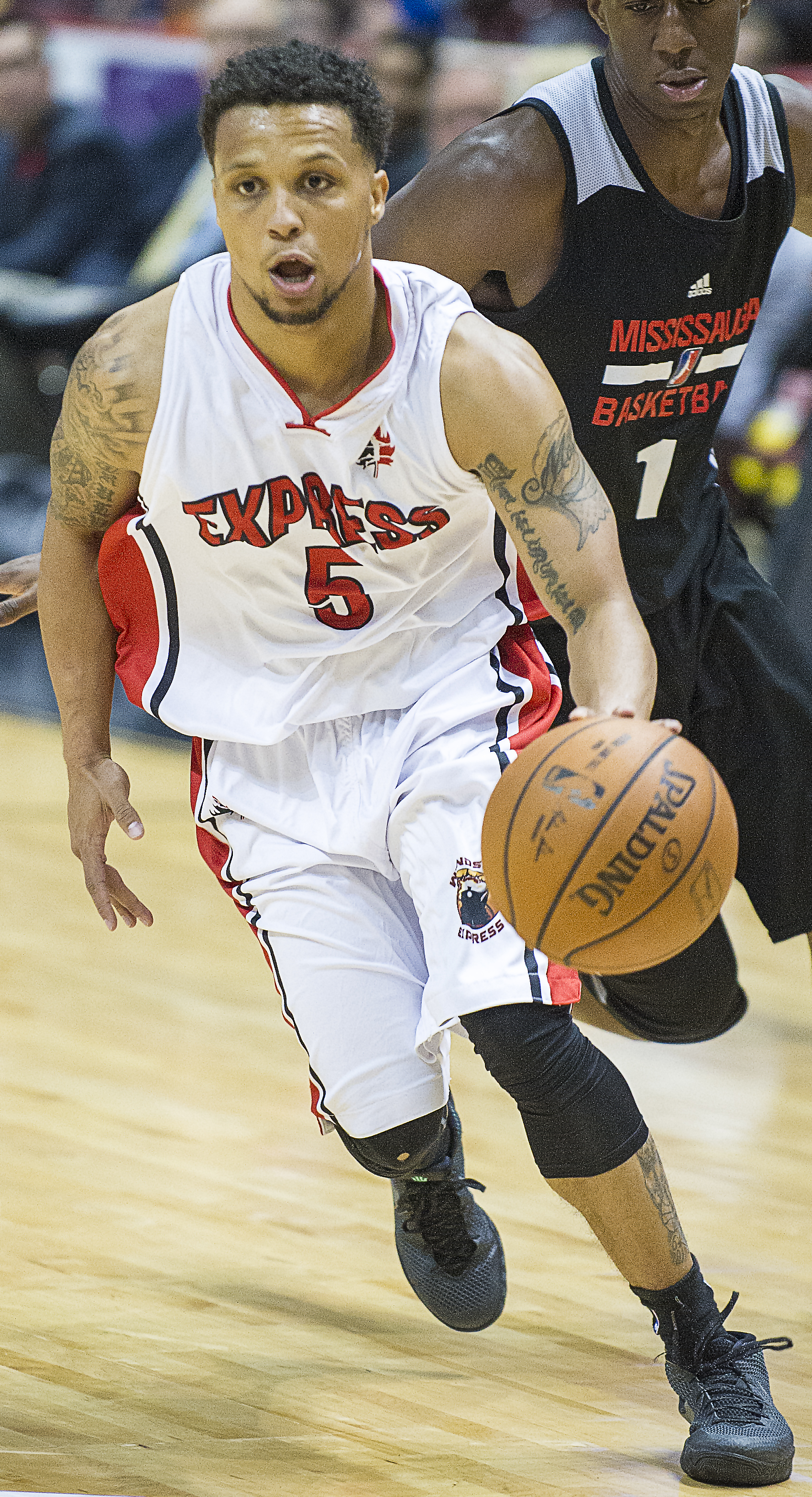
- Moss with the Windsor Express in 2015

Personal information
- Born: August 3, 1988 (age 38) Centralia, Illinois, U.S.
- Listed height: 5 ft 9 in (1.75 m)
- Listed weight: 160 lb (73 kg)

Career information
- High school: Franklin Community (Franklin, Indiana)
- College: IUPUI (2007–2009); Indianapolis (2010–2012)
- NBA draft: 2012: undrafted
- Playing career: 2012–present
- Position: Point guard

Career history
- 2012–2013: London Lightning
- 2013–2014: Island Storm
- 2014–2015: London Lightning
- 2015–2016: Windsor Express

Career highlights
- NBL Canada champion (2013) and 1st Round Draft Pick (6th pick); NCAA Division II All American and Back to Back NCAA Tournament Appearances; Top 5 in University of Indianapolis history in scoring, assist, and steals per game (2012); Indiana High School All State, voted top 15 underclass, Junior All Star, Indy South and Johnson County Player of the Year, Indy-Star Super Team.; Top 5 in Franklin Community history in scoring, assist, and steals per game (2007)

Adrian Moss (born August 3, 1988) is an American former professional basketball player. Born in Centralia, Illinois, he played high school basketball for Franklin Community High School. Following his graduation, he committed to IUPUI to play college basketball. After his sophomore season at IUPUI he transferred to the University of Indianapolis, where he played for two more seasons.

Upon graduation from college, he signed a professional contract with NBL Canada franchise London Lightning, with whom he won the 2013 NBL Canada Finals. After playing for Island Storm for a season, he returned to the London Lightning in 2014, to move midway the season to Windsor Express. He was released by the Express in 2016, shortly before the end of the season.

== Early life and career ==
Moss was born on August 3, 1988, to Terry and Angi Moss. Brought up in Centralia, Illinois, he played for Franklin Community High School, where he averaged 21.4 points, 7.3 assists and 2.9 steals per game in his senior season. In his final year, Moss was named Indiana Mini Mr. Basketball for being the state's top player standing below six feet (1.83 m); he also played football in high school, gaining all-county honors.

== College career ==
After receiving interest from Robert Morris and Southern Illinois, Moss committed to IUPUI Jaguars. In his debut for the Jaguars, against IU South Bend, he had 5 points, 5 assists and 3 steals, all season-highs. Throughout his freshman season he appeared in 11 games, averaging 1.5 points, 0.9 assists and 0.6 steals per game. He saw increased playing time in his sophomore season, starting 10 of his 21 games. On February 21, 2009, he recorded a career-high 14 points against Oakland. In 16.8 minutes per game, Moss averaged 4.8 points, 1.4 rebounds, 2.5 assists and 1.0 steal per game.

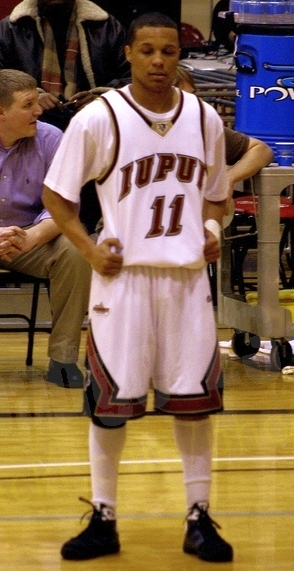
Moss with IUPUI in 2009.

After his sophomore season at IUPUI, Moss transferred to the University of Indianapolis. He had to sit out the 2009–2010 season, due to NCAA transfer rules. On January 4, 2011, he scored a season-high 29 points against Quincy and also had 5 rebounds and 5 assists. As a senior, he scored his career-high 32 points against Northern Michigan. On February 18, 2012, Moss recorded the first triple-double in Indianapolis' history, with 18 points, 10 rebounds and assists, to help his team get past Wisconsin–Parkside 84–57.

== Professional career ==
Moss was selected with the sixth overall pick in 2012 NBL Canada draft by the Quebec Kebs, only to be traded to the London Lightning for cash considerations. On December 2, he recorded a regular season-high, with 21 points, against the Halifax Rainmen, a feature he tied on March 3, 2013, against the Summerside Storm. He recorded his first double-double, with 20 points and 10 assists, to help his team get past the Montreal Jazz 139–92. He started 19 of his 40 regular season games, averaging 10.2 points, 2.6 rebounds, 5.2 assists and 1.5 steals per game.

On November 25, 2013, Moss signed for the Island Storm. He recorded a career-high 33 points versus the Halifax Rainmen on December 8. On March 24 he recorded a triple-double, with 17 points, 15 assists and 10 rebounds in his team's playoff win against the Halifax Rainmen. In November 2014 Moss signed for the London Lightning for a second time in his career. In February 2015 he was signed by the Windsor Express, and was released by the Express on March 26, 2015. Moss appeared in an exhibition match of Windsor against Raptors 905 on November 12, 2015, and was named man of the match after scoring 38 points. He was re-signed by the Express a couple of days later. Windsor's coach Tony Jones commented on his signing, that Moss had the potential to become the team's starting point guard. He recorded 19 points, nine rebounds, and seven assists on January 1, 2016, against the Orangeville A's. On February 6, 2016, Moss was released by the Express after the team signed Eric Frederick.
