= 2011–12 NBL Canada season =

- League: National Basketball League of Canada
- Sport: Basketball
- Duration: October 29, 2011 – March 4, 2012 (regular season)

Draft
- Top draft pick: Morgan Lewis
- Picked by: Oshawa Power

NBL Canada seasons
- 2012–13 →

The 2011–12 NBL Canada season was the inaugural season of the National Basketball League of Canada.

== Teams ==
2011-12 National Basketball League of Canada
Team	City	Arena	Capacity
Halifax Rainmen	Halifax, Nova Scotia	Halifax Metro Centre	10,500
London Lightning	London, Ontario	John Labatt Centre	9,000
Moncton Miracles	Moncton, New Brunswick	Moncton Coliseum	6,554
Oshawa Power	Oshawa, Ontario	General Motors Centre	5,180
Quebec Kebs	Quebec City, Quebec	PEPS	3,000
Saint John Mill Rats	Saint John, New Brunswick	Harbour Station	6,603
Summerside Storm	Summerside, Prince Edward Island	Credit Union Place	4,532

=== Map of teams ===
NBL Canada Teams

== Draft ==
The 2011 NBL Canada Draft was held August 21, 2011. The Oshawa Power had the first pick and selected shooting guard Morgan Lewis.

== Regular season ==
The regular season began October 29, 2011 with the Quebec Kebs defeating the Moncton Miracles 102–97.

== Standings ==
#	2011-12 NBL Canada Standings						
#	Team	W	L	GB	PCT	PF	PA
1	y London Lightning	28	8	--	.778	3711	3442
2	x Halifax Rainmen	23	13	5	.639	3813	3604
3	x Quebec Kebs	22	14	6	.611	3457	3403
4	x Saint John Mill Rats	17	19	11	.472	3576	3586
5	Oshawa Power	15	21	13	.417	3566	3694
6	Summerside Storm	12	24	16	.333	3770	3903
7	Moncton Miracles	9	27	19	.250	3284	3537

== Playoffs ==
Semifinals
1	London	2
4	Saint John	0
2	Halifax	2
3	Quebec	1

Finals
1	London	3
2	Halifax	2

=== Semifinals ===
(1) London Lightning vs. (4) Saint John Mill Rats

March 6
7:00 pm

Report 1

London Lightning 106, Saint John Mill Rats 105
Scoring by quarter: 17–23, 32–30, 34–35, 23–17
Pts: Gabe Freeman, Shamari Spears 18 Each; Rebs: Brandon Dean 7 Asts: Brandon Dean 13	Pts: Anthony Anderson 26; Rebs: Kevin Francis 9 Asts: Anthony Anderson 12

Harbour Station, Saint John, New Brunswick
Attendance: 2,117

March 9
7:00 pm

Report

Saint John Mill Rats 82, London Lightning 87
Scoring by quarter: 13–24, 30–16, 20–24, 19–23
Pts: Jermaine Blackburn 24; Rebs: Jermaine Blackburn 10; Asts: Darren Duncan 5	Pts: Shamari Spears 18; Rebs: Gabe Freeman 15; Asts: Shawn Daniels 5

John Labatt Centre, London, Ontario
Attendance: 3,919

(2) Halifax Rainmen vs. (3) Quebec Kebs

March 11
7:00 pm

Report

Halifax Rainmen 96, Quebec Kebs 87
Scoring by quarter: 28–22, 24–25, 20–16, 24–24
Pts: Chris Hagan, Lawrence Wright 16 Each; Rebs: Tyrone Levett 10; Asts: Taliek Brown 6	Pts: Ralphy Holmes 18; Rebs: Ralphy Holmes 12; Asts: Ralphy Holmes, Royce Parran 5 each

PEPS, Quebec City, Quebec
Attendance: 943

March 15
7:00 pm

Report

Quebec Kebs 112, Halifax Rainmen 109
Scoring by quarter: 29–23, 28–28, 29–27, 26–31
Pts: Royce Parran 39; Rebs: Boo Jackson 12; Asts: Shaun Fountain 6	Pts: Tyrone Levett 24; Rebs: Eric Crookshank 15; Asts: Taliek Brown 7

Metro Centre, Halifax, Nova Scotia
Attendance: 2,842

March 16
7:00 pm

Report

Quebec Kebs 95, Halifax Rainmen 106
Scoring by quarter: 24–26, 18–22, 28–31, 25–27
Pts: Carl Krauser 19; Rebs: Quinnel Brown, Aaron Spears 6 each Asts: Royce Parran 4	Pts: Chris Hagan 27; Rebs: Tyrone Levett 11; Asts: Chris Hagan 6

Metro Centre, Halifax, Nova Scotia
Attendance: 1,982

=== Finals ===
March 18
4:00 pm

Report

Halifax Rainmen 83, London Lightning 86
Scoring by quarter: 18–20, 21–23, 27–17, 17–26
Pts: Chris Hagan 23; Rebs: Tyrone Levett 12; Asts: Chris Hagan, Tyrone Levett, Lawrence Wright 3 each	Pts: Gabe Freeman 17; Rebs: Gabe Freeman 13; Asts: Eddie Smith 6

John Labatt Centre, London, Ontario
Attendance: 2,200

March 19
7:00 pm

Report

Halifax Rainmen 96, London Lightning 113
Scoring by quarter: 16–31, 23–32, 33–19, 24–31
Pts: Taliek Brown 20; Rebs: Darnell Hugee 10; Asts: Taliek Brown 3	Pts: Eddie Smith 25; Rebs: Gabe Freeman 13; Asts: Gabe Freeman 4

John Labatt Centre, London, Ontario
Attendance: 2,543

March 21
7:00 pm

Report

London Lightning 93, Halifax Rainmen 95
Scoring by quarter: 21–22, 26–26, 22–20, 24–27
Pts: Tim Ellis 22; Rebs: Gabe Freeman 12; Asts: Gabe Freeman, Eddie Smith 6 each	Pts: Chris Hagan 16; Rebs: Joey Haywood 6 Asts: Chris Hagan 4

Metro Centre, Halifax, Nova Scotia
Attendance: 3,933

March 22
7:00 pm

Report

London Lightning 85, Halifax Rainmen 93
Scoring by quarter: 22–21, 26–21, 10–26, 27–25
Pts: Gabe Freeman 21; Rebs: Gabe Freeman 21; Asts: Eddie Smith 5	Pts: Taliek Brown 20; Rebs: Eric Crookshank 13; Asts: Chris Hagan 6

Metro Centre, Halifax, Nova Scotia
Attendance: 3,842

March 23
2:00 pm

Report

Halifax Rainmen 92, London Lightning 116
Scoring by quarter: 26–23, 25–32, 26–26, 15–35
Pts: Chris Hagan 21; Rebs: Darnell Hugee, Tyrone Levett 7 each Asts: Taliek Brown 5	Pts: DeAnthony Bowden 28; Rebs: Tim Ellis 14; Asts: Eddie Smith 7

John Labatt Centre, London, Ontario
Attendance: 5,106
