= Gabe Freeman =

American basketball player (born 1985)

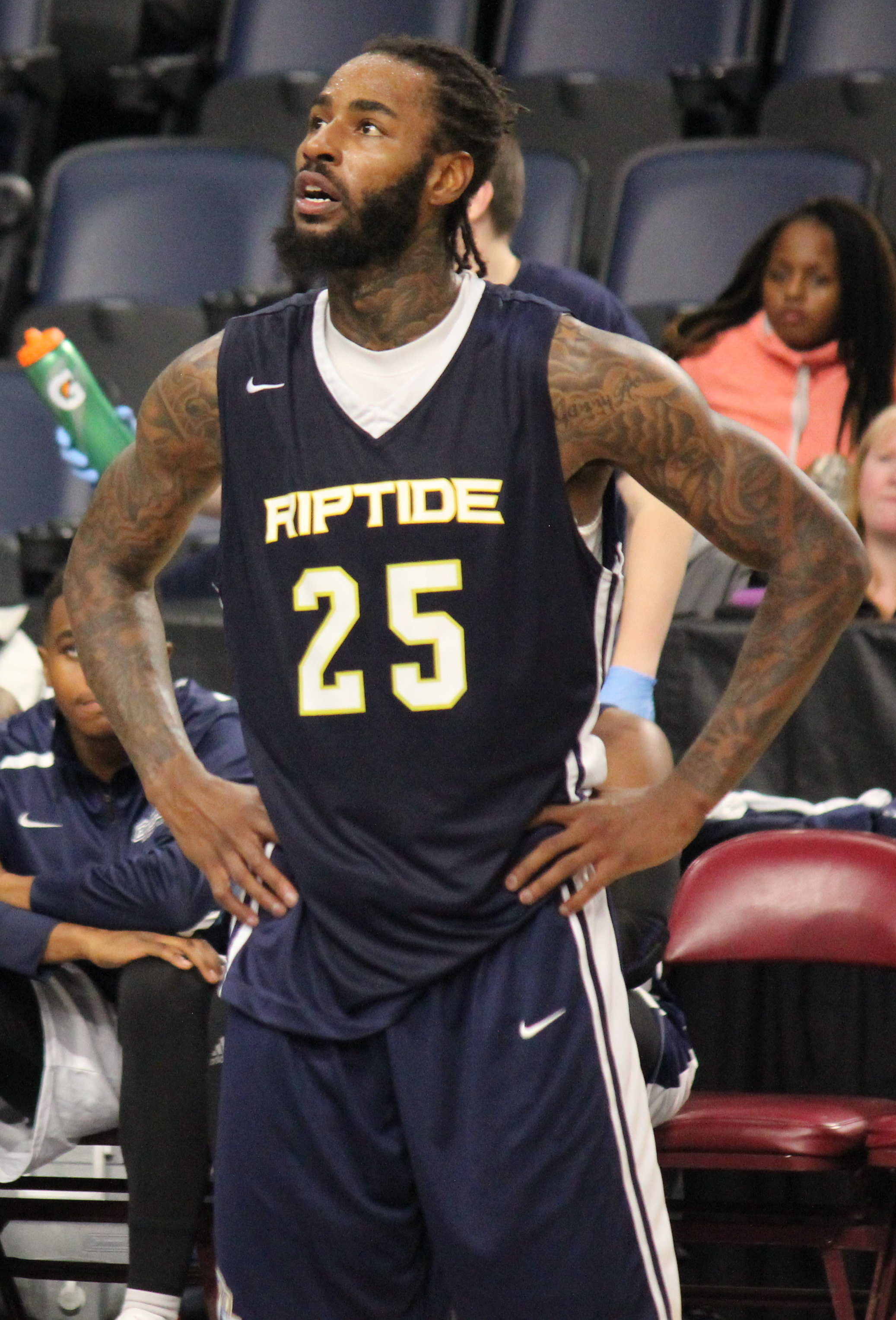
- Freeman with the Riptide in 2017

Personal information
- Born: November 5, 1985 (age 41) Phoenix, Arizona, U.S.
- Listed height: 6 ft 6 in (1.98 m)
- Listed weight: 205 lb (93 kg)

Career information
- High school: McClintock (Tempe, Arizona)
- College: Mesa CC (2006–2007)
- NBA draft: 2007: undrafted
- Playing career: 2007–2019
- Position: Small forward / power forward

Career history
- 2007–2008: Correcaminos UAT
- 2008–2009: Albany Patroons
- 2009: San Miguel Beermen
- 2009–2010: Lawton-Fort Sill Cavalry
- 2010: Philippine Patriots
- 2010: San Miguel Beermen
- 2010: Townsville Crocodiles
- 2010–2011: Philippine Patriots
- 2011: Lawton-Fort Sill Cavalry
- 2011–2012: London Lightning
- 2012: Barako Bull Energy
- 2012: Petron Blaze Boosters
- 2012: London Lightning
- 2012: Barangay Ginebra
- 2013: Petron Blaze Boosters
- 2013: London Lightning (Canada)
- 2014: Barangay Ginebra
- 2014–2015: Rochester Razorsharks
- 2015–2016: Saint John Mill Rats
- 2016–2017: Saint John Riptide
- 2017–2018: Al-Shorta
- 2018–2019: Halifax Hurricanes

Career highlights
- PBL champion (2015); NBL Canada Most Valuable Player (2012); All-NBL Canada First Team (2012); All-NBL Canada Defence First Team (2012); NBL Canada champion (2012); NBL Canada All-Star (2012); PBA champion (2009 Fiesta); 2× PBA Best Import of the Conference (2009, 2010); ABL champion (2010); CBA Defensive Player of the Year (2009)

Gabriel DeAndre Freeman (born November 5, 1985) is an American former professional basketball player. Freeman also has experience with the London Lightning in the NBL Canada and steered them to a 2012 Finals victory. He won the ASEAN Basketball League championship with the Philippine Patriots in 2009 and led the San Miguel Beermen to a 2009 PBA Fiesta Conference title earlier that year.

== Early life and college ==
Born in Phoenix, Freeman graduated from McClintock High School of Tempe, Arizona in 2004. He attended Southern Utah University but never played a game for the Thunderbirds basketball team. At Mesa Community College, Freeman was a first-team All-ACCAC selection in the 2006–07 season and averaged 16.8 points and 8.9 rebounds.

== Professional career ==
Freeman signed with Correcaminos UAT Reynosa of the Mexican LNBP in 2007 and averaged 22.6 points and 8.1 rebounds in ten games.

For part of the 2008–09 season, Freeman played for the Albany Patroons in the CBA. Albany made the CBA Finals but lost to the Lawton-Fort Sill Cavalry. In 15 games with the Patroons, he averaged 14.3 points per game and 9.7 rebounds per game. He wore jersey number 34.

He was chosen by the San Miguel Beermen as an import in the middle of the 2008–09 season. He played 24 games and averaged 22.3 points, 15.5 rebounds, and 1.3 assists. Freeman was awarded the Best Import of the conference. In the following season, Freeman played 29 games for San Miguel and averaged 21.6 points, 17.3 rebounds, and 1.5 assists.

The Philippine Patriots of the ASEAN Basketball League signed Freeman to replace Brandon Powell in January 2010.

He did not fail his team, and with a hard-fought battle between Ginebra and their fans, he led the San Miguel franchise to its 18th championship, which was also his career first. PBA fans credited his heart and hard work as a big factor in their victory.

On July 12, 2010, Freeman signed with the Townsville Crocodiles of the NBL of Australia.

Freeman re-signed with the Philippine Patriots in December 2010. In the first game of the ASEAN semifinals on January 22, 2011, Freeman scored 36 points and made 11 rebounds and 5 assists in an 88–83 victory over the KL Dragons.

On October 21, 2011, it was announced that Freeman had made the final 12-man roster for the National Basketball League of Canada's London Lightning. He wore jersey number 25. Finding immediate success with the Lightning, Freeman was named the first ever NBL Canada Player of the Week for the week ending November 6, an award he would win again for the weeks ending January 1 and March 4, 2012. The Lightning would go on to finish the regular season at 28–8 and gain home-court advantage throughout the playoffs.

On March 14, 2012, Freeman was named the NBL Canada's inaugural Rogers Communications Most Valuable Player. More importantly, however, on March 25, he led the Lightning to a 116–92 victory over the Halifax Rainmen in a deciding Game Five of the NBL Canada Finals to win the NBL Canada's inaugural championship. In addition to his regular-season MVP award, Freeman was named the Finals' MVP.

Freeman signed with the PBA team Barako Bull Energy on April 2, 2012. In 7 games, Freeman averaged 21.7 points, 14.0 rebounds, 2.71 assists, and 1.0 steal.

Freeman returned to the Philippine Patriots on September 18, 2012. In January 2013, Freeman again signed with the San Miguel Beermen. On February 26, 2013, the ASEAN league suspended Freeman for one game and issued him a fine for unsportsmanlike conduct. Freeman later suffered an injury and was replaced by Justin Williams.

In 2014, a recovered Freeman played with the Rochester Razorsharks in the Premier Basketball League (PBL). He led his team to a PBL title and was named league and playoff most valuable player, with per-game averages of 19 points and 11 rebounds.

On November 19, 2015, Freeman signed with the Saint John Mill Rats of the National Basketball League of Canada (NBL). He joined the team with returning player and former Most Valuable Player in Anthony Anderson.

On August 28, 2018, Freeman signed with the St. John's Edge of the National Basketball League of Canada (NBL).

== Personal life ==
Freeman has established a foundation in London, Ontario, for kids without means to play basketball. He is a mechanic and worked out of a motorcycle shop in Phoenix.
