= Stefan Bonneau =

American basketball player (born 1987)

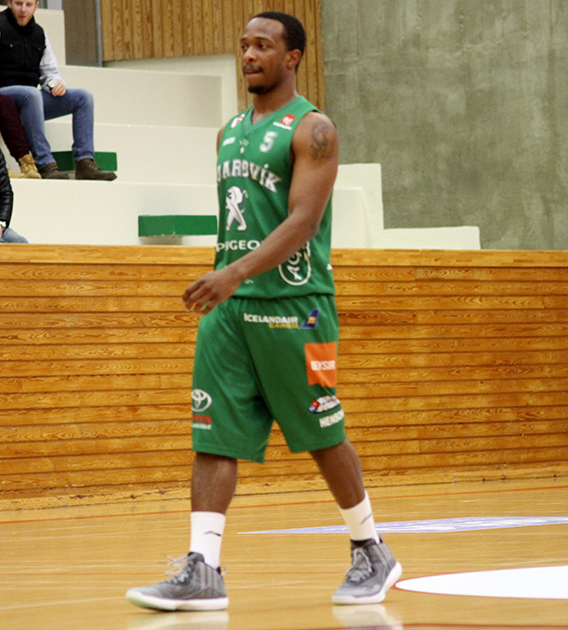
- Bonneau with Njarðvík in Iceland

Personal information
- Born: March 13, 1987 (age 39) Middletown, New York, US
- Listed height: 5 ft 10 in (1.78 m)
- Listed weight: 170 lb (77 kg)

Career information
- High school: Middletown (Middletown, New York)
- College: Orange County CC (2005–2008); LIU Post (2010–2012)
- Playing career: 2012–2017
- Position: Point guard

Career history
- 2012–2014: Windsor Express
- 2014: Xinjiang Flying Tigers
- 2014–2016: Njarðvík
- 2016: → Njarðvík-b
- 2016–2017: Svendborg Rabbits
- 2017: APOP Paphos BC
- 2017: Stjarnan

Career highlights
- NBL Canada champion (2014); NBL Canada Finals MVP (2014); First-team All-NBL Canada (2014); Úrvalsdeild scoring champion (2015); 2× ECC Player of the Year (2011, 2012)

Stefan Bonneau (born March 13, 1987) is an American former professional basketball player. Born in Middletown, Orange County, New York, Bonneau played high school basketball for Middletown. He then played for the SUNY Orange Colts of the NJCAA. After graduating, he enrolled in LIU Post to play for the Pioneers in NCAA Division II. In both his seasons with the Pioneers, Bonneau won the East Coast Conference (ECC) championships and was named All-ECC Player of the Year.

In 2012, he signed for the Windsor Express of the NBL Canada, with whom he won the 2014 NBL Canada Championship and was named NBL Canada Finals MVP. He later played in China, Denmark, Cyprus and Iceland where he led the Úrvalsdeild karla in scoring in 2015.

== Early life and career ==
Bonneau was born on March 13, 1987, in Middletown, Orange County, New York. He was born to Benjamin and Laverne Bonneau and has two siblings. He played varsity basketball for two years in Middletown High School, from which he graduated in 2005.

== College career ==
Bonneau came off the bench in the start of his freshman season for the SUNY Orange Colts, but he eventually was the team's leading scorer with 16.5 points and 1.9 steals per game, also averaging 3.8 rebounds and 2.6 assists per game. He had to sit out his sophomore season due to academic reasons. As a junior, he broke his wrist in training to miss the first six weeks of the season. Bonneau recognized that sitting out was of benefit to both his academic habits and his game. In 19 games with the Colts he averaged 30.9 points, 6.3 rebounds, 2.5 assists and 1.6 steals per game. After his second season at SUNY Orange, Bonneau drew interest by NCAA Division I colleges Providence and St. John's, but he was not able to enroll due to academic reasons.

After two season with the SUNY Orange Colts, Bonneau transferred to NCAA Division II college LIU Post. On January 8, 2011, he posted a career-high 39 points against Queens College. In the 2011 East Coast Conference (ECC) championship game, Bonneau scored 21 points and grabbed 5 rebounds to help the Pioneers win. He averaged 18.9 points, 4.2 rebounds, 2.1 assists and 1.1 steals per game, in 30 games, throughout the 2011–12 season. In his senior season, he posted a season-high 32 points against UDC. In the 2012 ECC championship game, Bonneau scored 29 points and dished 5 assists to help the Pioneers win the tournament again. For his performances in the tournament he was named its Most Outstanding Player. In his senior season Bonneau appeared in 29 games, averaging 21.7 points, 3.9 rebounds, 3.3 assists and 1.4 steals per game, in 30 games, throughout the 2011–12 season. He was named All-Metropolitan Basketball Writers Association Division II Player of the year in 2012. Bonneau was twice All–ECC player of the year, in 2011 and 2012.

== Professional career ==
=== D-League draft and NBL Canada championship ===
Bonneau was selected in the sixth round of the 2012 NBA Development League Draft with the 94th overall pick by the Springfield Armor, before being traded to the Austin Toros. Bonneau had his rookie season for the Windsor Express in the 2012–13 season. He won the slam-dunk contest of the 2013 NBL Canada All-Star game. Bonneau appeared in 29 regular season games, averaging 7.1 points, 1.6 rebounds and 1.6 assists per game. On September 28, 2013, the Brampton A's signed him, only to trade him a month later to the Windsor Express. Bonneau had a season high 34 points against the Ottawa SkyHawks. He started 33 of 38 regular season games, averaging 22.6 points, 5.0 rebounds, 4.6 assists and 1.5 steals per game. Bonneau was named NBL Canada Finals MVP and first-team All-NBL Canada for the 2013–14 season. On October 31, 2014, the Express traded his rights to the London Lightning for Tony Bennett.

=== Second D-League draft and China ===
On November 1, 2014, he was drafted by the Fort Wayne Mad Ants with the 90th overall pick of the 2014 NBA Development League Draft. In November 2014, Bonneau signed with Chinese team Xinjiang Flying Tigers. He appeared in 6 games for the team, averaging 14.8 points, 3.0 rebounds and 2.7 assists per game.

=== Iceland and achilles injury ===
In late December, Bonneau signed for Njarðvík of the Icelandic Úrvalsdeild. He scored a regular season-high 45 points, to help his team win Stjarnan 92–86. On 17 April 2015, he scored 52 points against KR in the fifth game of the playoffs semi-final series. Following that performance, opponent head coach, Finnur Freyr Stefánsson, acknowledged Bonneau as one of the best players to ever play in the league. Bonneau led the Úrvalsdeild in scoring, averaging 36.9 points per game, also averaging 7.0 rebounds, 5.1 assists and 2.5 steals per game, in 11 games. On 17 June 2015, Bonneau signed a new annual contract with Njarðvík; the contract would make Bonneau the highest paid player in the club's history. Gunnar Örlygsson, the team's chairman, compared Bonneau with Lionel Messi in terms of impact on the club. During a pre-season training in September he suffered an achilles tendon rupture. Bonneau stayed in Iceland for rehabilitation, with an intent to join the team in the playoffs. On March 1, he returned to the court with Njarðvík's B-team in the third-tier 2. deild karla. In his first game back with the main team, on March 9, Bonneau again tore his achilles tendon, this time on his right foot, after only playing only 1 minute and 37 seconds. In October 2016, Bonneau signed a two-month contract with Njarðvík. At the end of the contract Njarðvík decided not renew it, citing their desire to acquire a bigger player.

=== Last years ===
On December 1, 2016, Bonneau signed with Svendborg Rabbits of the Danish Basketligaen. In 21 games for Svendborg, Bonneau averaged 15.8 points in 30.0 minutes per game. In September 2017, he signed with APOP Paphos BC of the Cyprus Basketball Division A before returning to Iceland again and signing a one-month deal with Stjarnan on October 15, with a team option of extending it to the end of the season. He left Stjarnan on November 3 due to a back injury after appearing in two games.
