= Cape Breton Highlanders (basketball) =

Basketball team in Sydney, Canada

- Division: Atlantic Division
- League: NBL Canada
- Founded: 2015
- Dissolved: 2019
- History: Cape Breton Highlanders; 2016–2019
- Arena: Centre 200
- Location: Sydney, Nova Scotia
- Team colours: Blue, red, white
- President: Tyrone Levingston
- Head coach: Bernardo Fitz-Gonzalez
- Website: HighlandersBasketball.ca

The Cape Breton Highlanders were a Canadian professional basketball team based in Sydney, Nova Scotia. They were granted a hiatus from the National Basketball League of Canada for the 2019–20 season, but have no schedule to return.

== History ==
In early June 2015, it was announced that Tyrone Levingston, the son of Halifax Rainmen owner Andre Levingston, was making an attempt to establish a basketball team in Sydney, Nova Scotia in Cape Breton Island. He drew attention from businessman Parker Rudderham and many other locals that were willing to become a part of the team's ownership. Instead of him being the sole owner, Levingston preferred to have a group of multiple investors. By August, the team had expectations of playing their home games at Centre 200 and hoped to compete in the 2015–16 NBL Canada season.

On September 22, 2015, the team was officially admitted into the league for the upcoming season. Centre 200 was confirmed as their future home arena. Commissioner Dave Magley expected the league's expansion into Sydney to have positive financial ramifications. The team was also announced to be called "Cape Breton", with their nickname to be decided through a public contest. The nickname would be announced on October 15.

However, at the time Cape Breton's nickname was expected to be released to the public, the team was put on hold for the 2015–16 season, because they were unable to "get all the financing and other details put in place." Levingston said that he aimed to strike more sponsorship deals to ensure that the team would compete in the following season. Nevertheless, he planned to promote their nickname and logo as soon as possible. On November 24, 2015, the team's nickname was officially announced as the "Cape Breton Highlanders". It was inspired by the Cape Breton Highlanders military unit and the geography of the Cape Breton area itself. Centre 200 was the site of a 2015–16 NBL Canada preseason game between the Halifax Hurricanes and the Island Storm in order to promote the league to the new market. The Hurricanes won the game 106-103 in front of approximately 1,100 fans. On August 29, 2016, the Highlanders announced its ownership group and confirmed that the paperwork was being finalized with the league in order to join for the 2016–17 season. On October 7, the Highlanders announced its first head coach would be Dean Murray.

Coach Murray would end up being released midway through the first season on January 22 and replaced by assistant coach Ben Resner. When the season ended, the Highlanders were last in the Atlantic Division with a 15–25 record and failed to make the playoffs. In July 2017, the Highlanders hired longtime NBLC coach Rob Spon as the head coach for the 2017–18 season. Spon left after one season and was replaced by Bernardo Fitz-Gonzalez, a former Colombia national basketball team player. Under Fitz-Gonzalez, the team qualified for the playoffs for the first time. They lost to the Halifax Hurricanes two games to three in the best-of-five series.

After the season ended, team president and general manager Tyrone Levingston stated the team is in need of financial support from the community if the team is to return for the 2019–20 season. The organization then announced it had suspended operations on July 11, 2019, when they could not afford to pay the league dues. Levingston then announced a season ticket drive in which the team had to sell 1500 season tickets by August 25 in order to save the season, but only sold 652.

As of 2021, there are no plans for the Highlanders to return.

== Season-by-season record ==
Season	Coach	Regular season				Post season			
Season	Coach	Won	Lost	Win %	Finish	Won	Lost	Win %	Result
2016–17	Dean Murray; Ben Resner	15	25	.375	5th	Did not qualify			
2017–18	Rob Spon	13	27	.325	5th	Did not qualify			
2018–19	Bernardo Fitz-Gonzalez	19	21	.475	3rd	2	3	.400	Lost in Division Semifinals
Totals		47	73	.392	—	2	3	.400	

== Current roster ==
Cape Breton Highlanders roster
Players
Coaches

Pos.	No.	Nat.	Name	Ht.	Wt.	Age
G		(United States)	Branch, Jamal	6 ft 3 in (1.91 m)	170 lb (77 kg)	32 – 30 September 1992
C	22	(Canada)	Craig, Jabari	6 ft 10 in (2.08 m)	235 lb (107 kg)	30 – 8 August 1995
G		(Canada)	Famutimi, Olu	6 ft 5 in (1.96 m)	220 lb (100 kg)	41 – 21 February 1984
C	32	(United States)	Giddings, Tanner	6 ft 10 in (2.08 m)	220 lb (100 kg)	31 – 17 April 1994
F	23	(Canada)	Johnson, Chris	6 ft 5 in (1.96 m)	205 lb (93 kg)	37 – 13 July 1988
PF	21	(United States)	Jones, Kenny	6 ft 6 in (1.98 m)	215 lb (98 kg)	41 – 17 January 1984
SG	1	(United States)	Massey Jr., Bruce	6 ft 3 in (1.91 m)	195 lb (88 kg)	34 – 2 September 1990
F	6	(United States)	McCullough, O'Louis	6 ft 6 in (1.98 m)	220 lb (100 kg)	43 – 13 March 1982
SG	11	(Canada)	Redpath, Aaron	6 ft 4 in (1.93 m)	195 lb (88 kg)	32 – 11 September 1992
SG	9	(Canada)	Reynolds, Jamal	6 ft 4 in (1.93 m)	175 lb (79 kg)	31 – 27 February 1994
PG	3	(United States)	Taylor, Justin	6 ft 3 in (1.91 m)	205 lb (93 kg)	39 – 6 December 1985
G	5	(United States)	Walker, Deshaunt	6 ft 0 in (1.83 m)	170 lb (77 kg)	33 – 21 September 1991
F	13	(United States)	Williams, George	6 ft 5 in (1.96 m)	220 lb (100 kg)	35 – 16 April 1990

Head coach

- Bernardo Fitz-Gonzalez

Legend

- (C) Team captain
- (I) Inactive
- Injured

- Roster
Updated: December 17, 2018
