= Halifax Hurricanes =

Basketball team in Halifax, Canada

- League: NBL Canada
- Founded: 2015
- Folded: 2021
- History: Halifax Hurricanes; 2015–2021
- Arena: Scotiabank Centre
- Capacity: 11,093
- Location: Halifax, Nova Scotia, Canada
- Team colours: Navy blue, sky blue, white
- Website: halifaxhurricanes.ca
Home	Away

The Halifax Hurricanes were a Canadian professional basketball team based in Halifax, Nova Scotia. The Hurricanes were founded as members of the National Basketball League of Canada (NBLC) to replace the Halifax Rainmen, who filed for bankruptcy in July 2015 ultimately leading to the club folding. In 2021, the organization left the NBLC.

== History ==
Following steadily declining attendance and fallout from the 2015 NBL Canada Finals brawl the Halifax Rainmen folded in July 2015, with owner Andre Levingston citing bankruptcy with the franchise falling into a debt of nearly $700,000. The Rainmen's folding left a void in the Halifax professional basketball market and the league had lost one of its founding franchises and second largest market. Soon after, efforts began to replace the Rainmen.

On September 3, 2015, a new Halifax team was announced by the league. The new ownership group was expanded from just Andre Levingston to a 25-member investor group from the Halifax business community to stabilize ownership and reduce financial risk. Andre Levingston was named general manager of basketball operations. Hugo López was hired to be the franchise's first head coach on September 30, 2015. On October 20, 2015, the franchise unveiled its name and logo. The Hurricanes also announced their first two signings, former Rainmen player Cliff Clinkscales and newcomer Mike Glover.

In their first season, the Hurricanes won both preseason games before winning their first regular-season home game 129–113 against the Moncton Miracles in front of approximately 2,000 fans on December 26, 2015.

Coach López and the Hurricanes were unable to come to terms for a second season and Kevin Keathley was hired as head coach and general manager for the 2016–17 season. Unfortunately, coach Keathley had to leave the team before his first season for personal reasons. He was replaced by Mike Leslie. After three seasons, Leslie moved up to be the Hurricanes' president and general manager, with Ryan Marchand taking over as head coach.

The 2019–20 season was then curtailed in March 2020 due to the onset of the COVID-19 pandemic. The league subsequently cancelled its 2020–21 season due to continuing restrictions during the pandemic. In October 2021, the Hurricanes announced they had left the league.

== Home arena ==
The Scotiabank Centre is a multi-purpose indoor sporting arena located in Halifax, Nova Scotia, Canada. The arena has a basketball capacity of 11,093. The Hurricanes share the arena with the Halifax Mooseheads of the Quebec Major Junior Hockey League, and The Halifax Thunderbirds of the National Lacrosse League. The building is next to the World Trade and Convention Centre in Downtown Halifax, at the foot of Citadel Hill and it is the largest arena in the maritimes by seating capacity.

== Current roster ==
Halifax Hurricanes roster
Players
Coaches

Pos.	No.	Nat.	Name	Ht.	Wt.	Age
F	15	(Canada)	Arseneault, Kyle	6 ft 5 in (1.96 m)	220 lb (100 kg)	31 – 24 October 1994
PG	12	(United States)	Clinkscales, Cliff (C)	1.84 m (6 ft 0 in)	185 lb (84 kg)	42 – 11 March 1984
F	25	(United States)	Freeman, Gabe	6 ft 6 in (1.98 m)	205 lb (93 kg)	40 – 5 November 1985
PF		(United States)	Hall, Carl	2.03 m (6 ft 8 in)	238 lb (108 kg)	36 – 29 March 1989
SF	1	(Canada)	Johnson, Chris	1.96 m (6 ft 5 in)	205 lb (93 kg)	37 – 13 July 1988
F	20	(United States)	Johnson, Tremayne	2.01 m (6 ft 7 in)	200 lb (91 kg)	36 – 20 August 1989
G	13	(United States)	Kindred, Joel	1.95 m (6 ft 5 in)	194 lb (88 kg)	35 – 7 January 1991
SG	14	(United States)	Mason, Antoine	1.91 m (6 ft 3 in)	210 lb (95 kg)	33 – 24 May 1992
G	10	(Canada)	Scott, Calvin Tyler	6 ft 3 in (1.91 m)	200 lb (91 kg)	34 – 10 March 1992
PG	4	(United States)	Sibley, Devin	1.88 m (6 ft 2 in)	174 lb (79 kg)	30 – 9 February 1996
PF	22	(Canada)	Waithe, Marvell	6 ft 9 in (2.06 m)	216 lb (98 kg)	38 – 20 October 1987
PF	25	(United States)	Washington, CJ	2.03 m (6 ft 8 in)	219 lb (99 kg)	34 – 28 February 1992
G	2	(United States)	Zimmerman, Ta'Quan	1.88 m (6 ft 2 in)	200 lb (91 kg)	34 – 2 December 1991

Head coach

- (Canada) Mike Leslie

Legend

- (C) Team captain
- Injured

- Roster
Updated: January 9, 2020

== Season-by-season record ==
Season	Coach	Regular season						Postseason				
Season	Coach	GP	Won	Lost	Win %	Finish	Avg Attendance	GP	Won	Lost	Win %	Result
2015–16	Hugo López	40	29	11	.725	1st in Atlantic Division	1929	14	11	3	.786	League Champions
2016–17	Mike Leslie	40	27	13	.675	1st in Atlantic Division	1926	15	9	6	.600	Lost in finals
2017–18	Mike Leslie	40	28	12	.700	1st in Atlantic Division	1958	16	10	6	.625	Lost in finals
2018–19	Mike Leslie	40	25	15	.625	2nd in Atlantic Division	2095	12	6	6	.500	Lost in division finals
2019–20	Ryan Marchand	24	8	16	.333	—	1759	Season curtailed by the COVID-19 pandemic				
Totals		184	117	67	.636	3 division titles	1977	57	36	21	.632	1 League Championship

== Notable players ==
To appear in this section a player must have either:

- Set a club record or won an individual award as a professional player.
- Played at least one official international match for his senior national team at any time.

- (United States) Coreontae DeBerry

== See also ==
- Sports teams in Halifax, Nova Scotia
