= 2014–15 Halifax Rainmen season =

Halifax Rainmen
2014–15 season
- Owner: Andre Levingston
- Head coach: Josep Clarós
- Arena: Scotiabank Centre
- Central Division: 2nd (20–12 record [.625])
- Playoffs: Lost to Express 3–4 (NBL Canada Finals)

The 2014–15 Halifax Rainmen season was the fourth season of the franchise in the National Basketball League of Canada. The Rainmen finished the season with a 20–12, placing second overall in the league. They forfeited Game 7 of the 2015 Finals following a pre-game brawl with their opponents, the Windsor Express. It was their second appearance and defeat in the Finals.

== Draft ==
Round	Pick	Player	Position	Nationality	College
1	8	Mike Meyers Keitt	Small forward	United States	Monmouth
2	10	Courtney Beach	Small forward	United States	Grays Harbor CC
3	18	Jasonn Hannibal	Center	Canada	Portland

== Roster ==
Note: Flags indicate national team eligibility at FIBA-sanctioned events. Players may hold other non-FIBA nationalities not displayed.

Halifax Rainmen roster
Players
Coaches

Pos.	No.	Nat.	Name	Ht.	Wt.	Age
G	2	(United States)	Foster, Pedro	1.83 m (6 ft 0 in)	185 lb (84 kg)	33 – 11 April 1991
G	3	(Japan)	Ando, Seiya	1.83 m (6 ft 0 in)	180 lb (82 kg)	32 – 15 July 1992
G	4	(Canada)	Haywood, Joey	1.85 m (6 ft 1 in)	180 lb (82 kg)	40 – 3 September 1984
G	5	(Mexico)	Fisher, Forrest	1.93 m (6 ft 4 in)	193 lb (88 kg)	44 – 3 September 1980
F	8	(Canada)	Watson, Tyrone	1.96 m (6 ft 5 in)	230 lb (100 kg)	34 – 12 July 1990
G	9	(Canada)	Appiah, Douglas	1.85 m (6 ft 1 in)	175 lb (79 kg)	36 – 27 March 1988
F	11	(United States)	Cayole, Chris	2.01 m (6 ft 7 in)	220 lb (100 kg)	40 – 1 January 1985
G	12	(United States)	Clinkscales, Cliff	1.85 m (6 ft 1 in)	185 lb (84 kg)	41 – 11 March 1984
F	22	(United States)	Dailey, Jermaine	2.03 m (6 ft 8 in)	209 lb (95 kg)	38 – 17 September 1986
F	28	(Puerto Rico)	Young, Kevin	2.03 m (6 ft 8 in)	215 lb (98 kg)	34 – 24 June 1990
C	33	(United States)	McMorrow, Liam	2.18 m (7 ft 2 in)	25 lb (11 kg)	37 – 22 June 1987
C	42	(United States)	Spikes, Nigel	2.08 m (6 ft 10 in)	228 lb (103 kg)	35 – 18 October 1989

Head coach

- (Spain) Josep Clarós

Assistant coach(es)

- (Portugal) Pedro Monteiro

Legend

- (C) Team captain
- Injured

== Bankruptcy ==
On July 6, 2015, over one month after forfeiting the 2015 NBL Canada Finals, the Rainmen filed for bankruptcy. In a release, owner Andre Levingston said, "While it's disappointing to see this chapter end, I can hold my head high knowing that we did everything we could have done. I love this game and I love this city." It was later announced that the team would have new ownership, although it was unclear whether the nickname would remain the same.
