= 2015 NBL Canada Finals brawl =

Brawl at the 2015 National Basketball League of Canada (NBL) Finals

- Date: April 30, 2015
- Time: 10:40 EST (2:40 UTC)
- Venue: NBL Canada
- Location: WFCU Centre; 42.3186°N 82.9279°W
- Outcome: Mass suspensions and fines.
- Suspects: Windsor Express; Halifax Rainmen

The 2015 NBL Canada Finals brawl was an altercation that occurred prior to Game 7 of the year's National Basketball League of Canada (NBL) Finals, between the Windsor Express and Halifax Rainmen on April 30, 2015. It led to the Rainmen's forfeit of the deciding game and allowed the Express to win the championship by default. Windsor's guard Tony Bennett, who participated in the brawl, said, "It's a black eye not just for the league, but for basketball."

After the Rainmen reached the site of the game hours early and began warming up, they were discovered by Express assistant coach Gerry Brumpton. Windsor head coach Bill Jones later entered the room to retrieve a ball and violence erupted between him and Halifax center Liam McMorrow. This sparked a brawl between both the teams as a whole, causing police to arrive. The Rainmen eventually left the stadium and chose to not compete in Game 7 because of safety concerns.

The incident resulted in mass fines and several suspensions, most notably the lifetime ban of Rainmen coaches Josep Clarós and Pedro Monteiro from coaching in the NBL Canada. The league also fined the entire Halifax Rainmen organization, with charges totaling $90,000. Tony Bennett was the sole Express player to be fined and suspended. Many players, including Bennett, were reinstated into the league in the following season.

== Background ==
Both teams had previously appeared in the NBL Canada Finals, with the Windsor Express defeating the Island Storm in seven games in the previous season. The Halifax Rainmen appeared in the 2012 Finals, which was played in a best-of-five format, but dropped three games and lost to the London Lightning. Halifax finished the 2014–15 regular season as the Atlantic Division champions and had the second-best record in the league, behind only the Central Division winners, the Express. The Rainmen reached the 2015 finals via wins over the Moncton Miracles and Island Storm, 3–1 and 4–1 respectively; Windsor's route was through victories over Mississauga Power, by 3–1, and the Brampton A's, by 4–3.

== Series ==
The Rainmen entered the Finals series without playing a single game in 16 days and were defeated by Windsor in Game 1, 113–104. Chris Commons led the Express with 33 points and 8 rebounds and Tony Bennett added 25 points. Halifax struggled with fouls in the first quarter, and point guard Cliff Clinkscales most notably committed three fouls in the first 12 minutes of the game. He would finish the contest with six penalties. By the end of the game, seven Rainmen players had committed over three personal fouls and the team totaled for 48, allowing Windsor to get 55 free throw attempts. The Express, on the other hand, finished with 32 personal fouls. In the fourth quarter, Halifax's Liam McMorrow took a hard fall to his shoulder and was taken off the court with a stretcher. He would undergo a CT scan and MRI after feeling tingling in the injured area.

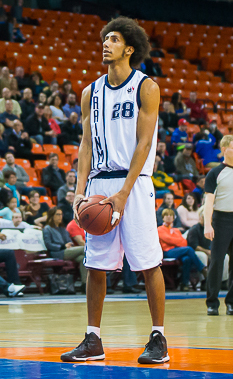
Kevin Young shoots a free throw for the Rainmen.

Halifax rallied in Game 2, winning a road game at the WFCU Centre in Windsor. The Rainmen committed 37 personal fouls in the entire game, but their opponents allowed them to attempt 44 free throws despite committing only 31.

The Rainmen followed up by ousting the Express in Game 3 at the Scotiabank Centre, their home arena. They were strongly benefited by their accurate free throw shooting, going 28 of 33 from the line; previously, Halifax shot at about .600 on free throws.

However, Windsor tied the series back up with a 109–105 road win in a foul-filled Game 4. A total of 71 fouls were called throughout the contest, and Seiya Ando, Kevin Young, and Liam McMorrow were fouled out for the Rainmen in the final quarter. In turn, both teams often exchanged trash-talk and officials were forced to separate members of the opposing sides on multiple occasions.

Halifax started off Game 5 at home on a low note, with Liam McMorrow committing four personal fouls in the first three minutes. Nevertheless, Halifax pulled away with the 125–91 victory, putting them one win away from the title. Rainmen forward Forrest Fisher complained about Windsor, "They're playing very physical, and at times a little bit dirty with sucker punches, and we started playing into their game (Friday) and that's not us. A couple of us can play like that, myself included, and we came out tonight and I told them 'hey, let me take the hits, I'm used to that. You guys play your normal game.' We play the way we play, and it doesn't matter how they play." According to The Chronicle Herald, "the game featured several incidents that threatened to escalate into a full-scale brawl." The teams' coaches would frequently have to break up skirmishes and confront officials for what they felt were bad calls.

In Game 6 of the series, the Express led by four points by the end of the first quarter, but the Rainmen responded with a 21–9 run and led by 12 points at halftime. Windsor, however, entered the fourth quarter with a score of 85–85 after dominating the third. In the third quarter, they shot 21 free throws. The Express kept it close in the final minutes of the game and held Halifax off to win the contest, 119–112, forcing a decisive Game 7. Quinnel Brown led the way for Windsor with 30 points, 16 of them off free throws. After the game, Rainmen head coach Josep Clarós expressed his unhappiness with the calls made by the referees against his team. Clarós said that rather than protesting to the league, he would "send film to FIBA." He commented on the officiating, "It's ridiculous for a final of a professional league in Canada." An anonymous referee later denounced the league's policy regarding player fines and suspensions. He said, "So you could have a guy punch a guy in the face in Game 1, get kicked out, and be playing in Game 2."

== Incident ==
=== Altercation ===
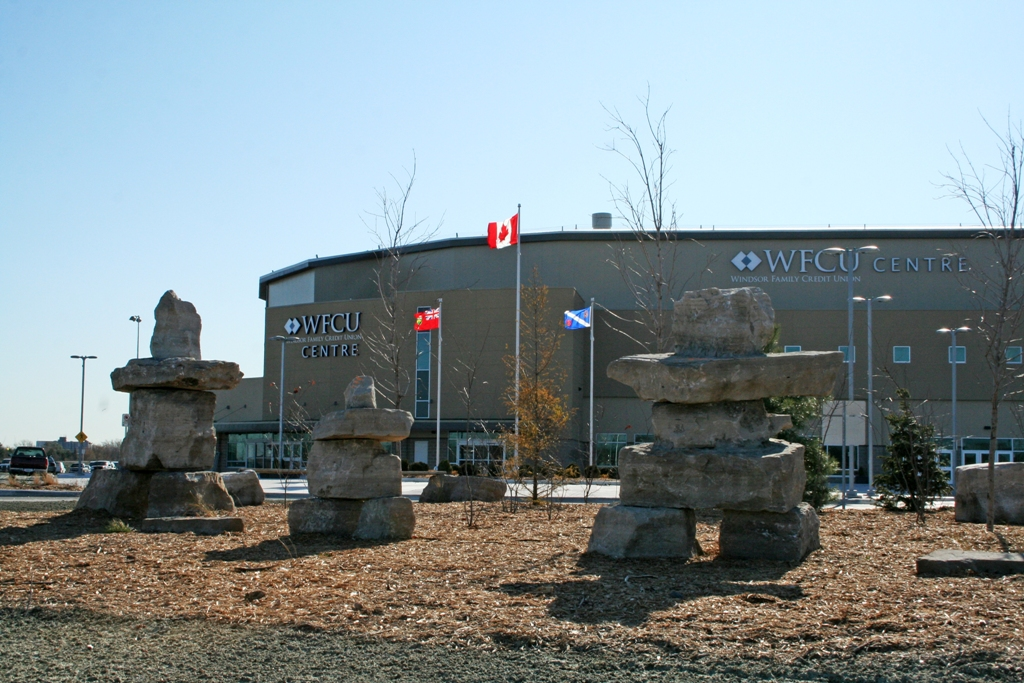
The WFCU Centre, the site of the brawl.

The deciding Game 7 of the 2015 Finals was scheduled to be played at 7:00 pm on April 30, 2015, at the WFCU Centre in Windsor, Ontario. The Express shootaround was set to take place before that of the Rainmen. The road team was supposed to arrive for warm-ups at approximately 1:00 pm, but entered the stadium approximately two hours earlier. Express assistant coach Gerry Brumpton recounted, "They snuck in here before they even had the light on. We were here in the dark, I opened up the curtain and I looked in and there they were. They were still here working out. So they had been here for a while." The Express told their opponents to leave the arena, but they refused, with one Rainmen player dunking a basketball instead. Windsor's Bill Jones then attempted to take a ball from Halifax center Liam McMorrow, but the player "flinched," pretending to throw a punch. According to Rainmen player Forrest Fisher, Jones tackled McMorrow to the ground and Express guard Tony Bennett followed up by hitting McMorrow with a chair. Referring to the Rainmen, Jones said, "A couple of them kicked me and tried to take swings at me. And my players were there and they came to my rescue to be able to get me up." Soon the violence escalated, with staff members and players from both teams involved. At around 10:40 am, Windsor police received a phone call "that between 15 to 20 men were involved in an altercation." By the time they arrived at the WFCU Centre, however, the fighting was over and the Rainmen players had already reached their team bus.

=== Forfeit ===
After leaving the stadium, the Rainmen drove to the airport. Part way there, they crossed paths with Vito Frijia, London Lightning owner and a member of the NBL Canada executive committee, who persuaded Levingston to have the bus pulled over. Despite Frijia spending a good hour attempting to convince the Rainmen's coaches to return to the WFCU Centre and play the game, they refused. According to Frijia:

"They didn't think about the future of the league, it was almost like the players were brainwashed. They weren't logical comments, the majority of them. 'We think there's going to be a brawl if we go there. We think they're going to undercut us. They're going to intentionally hurt us. We don't feel safe.' Some of the players weren't even on the bus, some of the players had already left."

The start time of Game 7 of the series was postponed from 8:00 to 8:30 pm AST, but it was cancelled once the Express were informed that the Rainmen had left the city. By the end of the night, Windsor were declared the NBL Canada champions. Shortly before the scheduled start time, the Rainmen said in an official statement, "Due to a physical altercation between the Halifax Rainmen and the Windsor Express, the game has been cancelled citing safety concerns." At around 9:00 pm, the Express were awarded the championship trophy and conducted their post-game celebrations.

== Reaction ==
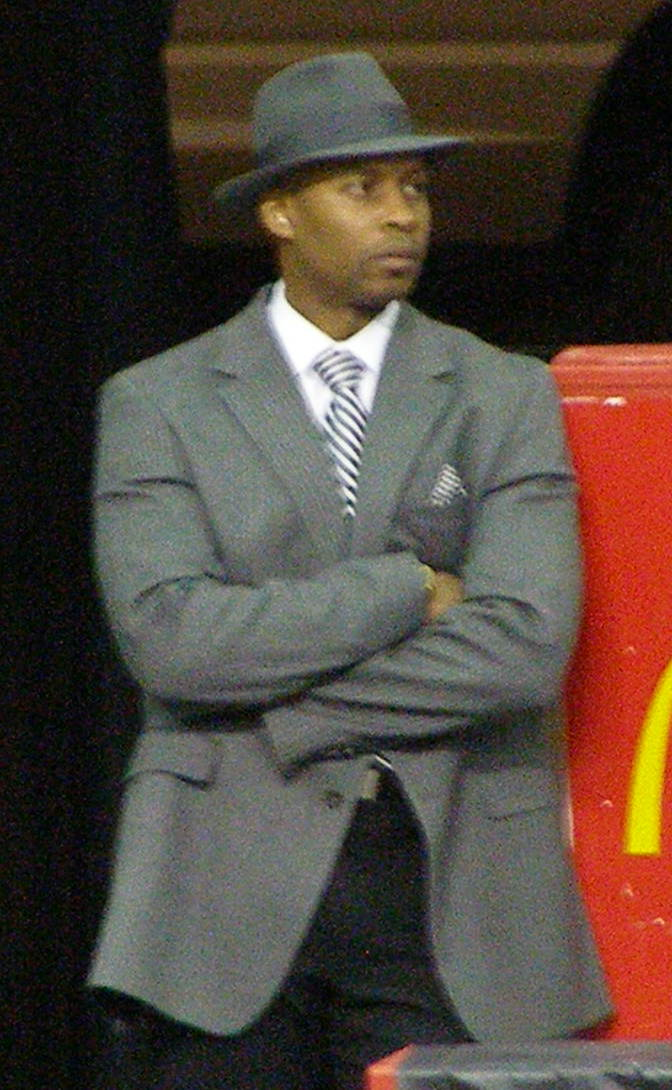
Rainmen owner Andre Levingston tried to convince his players to compete.

In the weeks after the forfeit, Rainmen guard Joey Haywood recounted that the team had been approached by an unknown man at their hotel following the brawl. Haywood said, "He was pacing around the lobby on his phone eyeing us. He then went to the ATM but didn't actually do anything. He went and sat in a parked car out front. We thought something was going to go down, like he was scouting us out." The Rainmen promptly left on the team bus, and it was considered a motive for forfeiting the game. On the morning of May 2, two days after the brawl, Rainmen guard Forrest Fisher wrote on Twitter that he had been kicked out of his apartment without warning. He said, "We were in Toronto Friday morning, and I get a message from the landlord at the apartment I stay at, telling me that my bags have been packed and all of my stuff has been moved to storage." The team management, who were responsible for players' living arrangements, were largely blamed for the affair. The players also claimed that they had not been paid in more than two weeks.

Members from the Rainmen profusely criticized the brutality of the Express throughout the series as well. Kevin Young was told by some of the Windsor players that their coach had told them to "take out" him, Liam McMorrow and Fisher. Cliff Clinkscales said, "There's a difference between playing physical and dirty and hurting people." Halifax entered Game 7 with two players out with concussions they suffered in the series itself. Clinkscales also played with injured ribs. Despite this, Levingston attempted to convince the players to play without their coaches, who favored forfeiting it. He also offered the Rainmen new coaches, a raised salary, and $1,000, but to no avail. Haywood said, "How could we play without coach, bringing another coach in? And do what? Coach us? He doesn't even know us." Levingston, on the other hand, slammed Clarós, saying that "instead of leading our team to the championship, he led a group of talented players to broken contracts and a lifetime of controversy." The owner claimed that he felt cheated and that the players were misled by their coaches. He took full responsibility for leading the Rainmen into the WFCU Centre ahead of schedule but believed that the two teams could have negotiated to avoid conflict.

Eric Crookshank, who had his jersey retired while playing for Halifax, said that the prospect of having the organization fold was "sad." He also said, "If what these players are saying is true it’s very hurtful to me. It sickening to my stomach that the players say they didn't get paid or they got kicked out of their living arrangements." Joey Haywood criticized the league for not having a players' union or commissioner, with "owners acting like commissioners." He also condemned Levingston for not standing up for his players. On May 7, Clarós issued an open letter to the City of Halifax and the fans of the Rainmen. In a paragraph about the forfeit, he wrote, "At this time, we don't know what the future holds. But there is one thing we know for sure. That when a group of good people unite to take a stand in the name of safety, good values, people’s rights and strong principles, that this will rise above any rules or even winning."

== Investigation and charges ==
Player/Coach	Team	Suspension by the NBL	Fined
Josep Clarós	Rainmen	Banned for life	$10,000
Pedro Monteiro*	Rainmen	Banned for life	$9,000
Seiya Ando	Rainmen	Suspended indefinitely	$5,000
Tony Bennett**†	Express	Suspended indefinitely	$5,000
Chris Cayole	Rainmen	Suspended indefinitely	$5,000
Cliff Clinkscales†	Rainmen	Suspended indefinitely	$5,000
Jermaine Dailey	Rainmen	Suspended indefinitely	$5,000
Forrest Fisher	Rainmen	Suspended indefinitely	$5,000
PJ Foster	Rainmen	Suspended indefinitely	$5,000
Joey Haywood†	Rainmen	Suspended indefinitely	$5,000
Liam McMorrow	Rainmen	Suspended indefinitely	$5,000
Nigel Spikes	Rainmen	Suspended indefinitely	$5,000
Tyrone Watson†	Rainmen	Suspended indefinitely	$5,000
Kevin Young	Rainmen	Suspended indefinitely	$5,000
Bill Jones†	Express	Suspended one season	$4,000
* received $4,000 fine later in the investigation, following an initial $5,000 fine **suspension and fine reduced after review † reinstated into NBL Canada for the following season

In the day after the forfeit, the NBL Canada announced, "The league takes this incident very seriously and we are working to address the matter to ensure it never happens in the future, and so that those who were responsible are held accountable." On May 5, 2015, Dave Magley, head coach and general manager of the Brampton A's during the season, was appointed by the league's Board of Governors to lead the investigation. He had already conducted interviews and spoken to representatives from both teams involved in the brawl. Magley also said that he would consider assuming the position of commissioner if he was approached, succeeding Paul Riley, who was fired in January 2015. Vito Frijia was named league spokesman during the investigation.

On May 1, 2015, the league's Board unanimously approved of several charges for players and coaches from the Rainmen. The organization as a whole was fined $20,000 per league rules, head coach Josep Clarós was fined $10,000 and assistant coach Pedro Monteiro was fined $5,000. Both coaches received lifetime bans from the NBL Canada as well. A $5,000 fine was imposed on every player on the team's roster, excluding Douglas Appiah Jr. who was injured at the time of the brawl. They were also suspended indefinitely during the investigation. Later on, the league allowed the Rainmen's players to apply for reinstatement into the league, although the coaches remained banned for life. Halifax's fines totaled $90,000. The Rainmen were not notified of their fines and suspensions through e-mail or a phone call. Instead they learned of it through Twitter. Clarós officially received his termination letter on May 5, after his contract had already been renewed for one more month. In an effort to give the players and coaches their final paychecks, he contacted the Canadian labour board. After one month, Clarós won the decision, but Levingston declared bankruptcy on July 6, the following day. According to bankruptcy documents, the Rainmen were about $700,000 in debt.

Later in the investigation, an additional $4,000 fine was imposed on Monteiro. The coach had a salary of only about $1,500 per month during the eight months he spent with the Rainmen. He was unable to contact team owner Andre Levingston, who did not assist or help him. Monteiro responded to the charges by claiming that they were unfair. In a statement on May 11, he said, "I am looking for help to fight these unjust sanctions and fines so I can continue to work and be able to support my family. The investigation was not full. The truth of what happened is being ignored. I have not been contacted by any league representative."

For the Express, head coach Bill Jones faced a one-year suspension that would bar him from directing his team in the 2015–16 season. He also received a $4,000 fine with Monteiro. The coach accepted responsibility for his role in the incident. Windsor guard Tony Bennett faced an indefinite suspension from the league during the investigation. Frijia said, "It was a very, very big decision to suspend Jones for a year." However, Express owner Dartis Willis claimed that the investigation was "botched," because Magley was an NBL Canada coach that had faced Jones in previous games.

== Aftermath ==
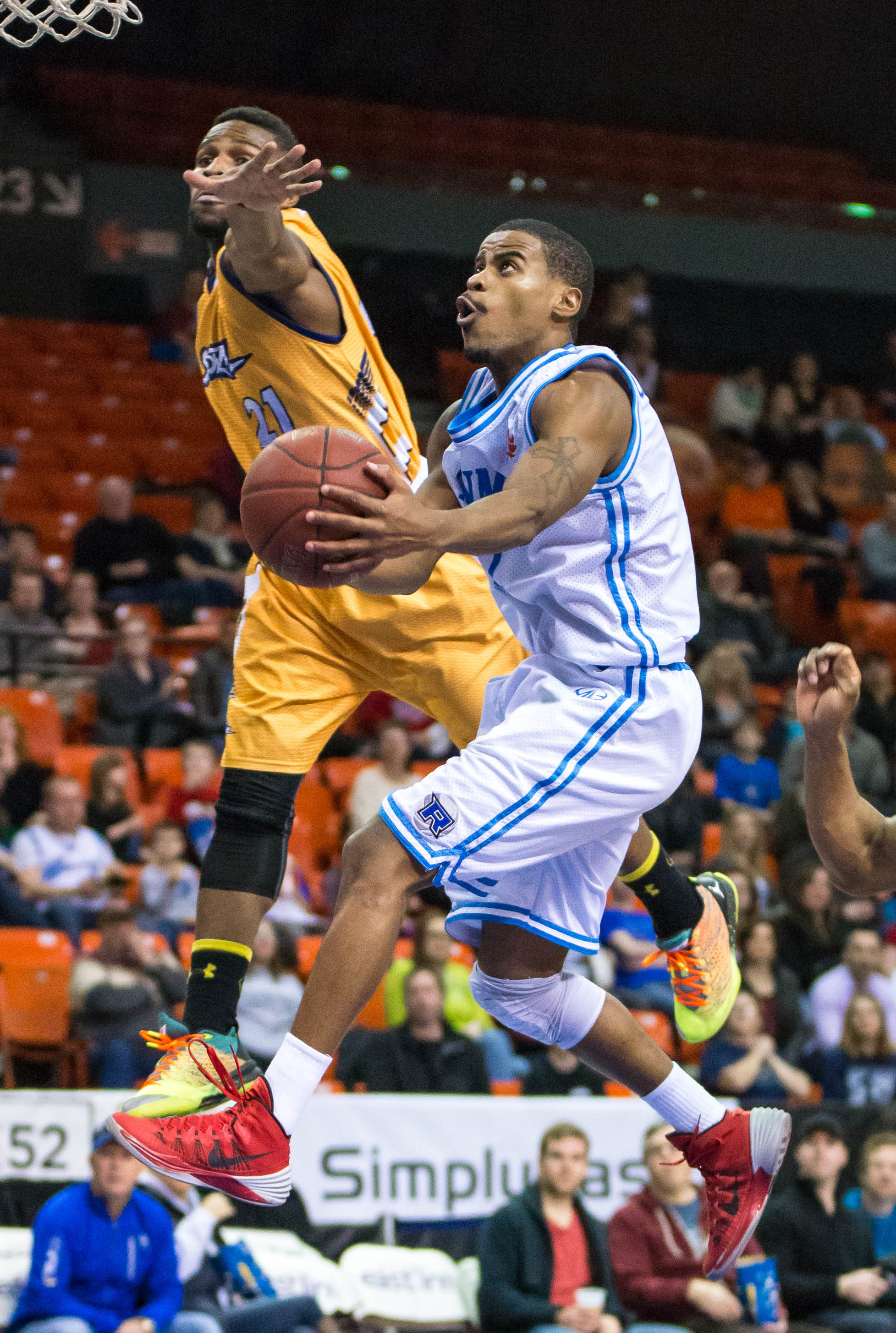
Cliff Clinkscales (right) was signed by the Halifax Hurricanes and reinstated.

By late August 2015, it became a strong possibility that a new NBL Canada team would be created in Halifax for the 2015–16 season. A new ownership group, led by former Rainmen advisor and CEO of Corporate Research Associates in Don Mills, soon confirmed that the defunct team's reincarnation would compete for the next season. Mills expected a group of 25 shareholders to help start up the organization, many of whom personally paid for the Rainmen's flights and hotels in the last season. He chose to not include Levingston in the ownership group but allowed him to assume the position as the team's general manager. Mills said, "There would not be a new team in Halifax without Andre. We decided that the only way we would go forward to raise the money was if Andre was part of the solution." Despite this, he preferred to break ties with the Rainmen franchise. It was not disclosed who paid for the $250,000 fee required for a team to register in the NBL Canada.

On October 20, 2015, the team was announced as the Halifax Hurricanes. Mills commented, "We think it's kind of an appropriate name from where we're located and from a sports team's point of view. What it really says is energy and power, so some of the descriptions of hurricanes sort of suit the kind of team that we want as well." The Hurricanes also signed Cliff Clinkscales and Mike Glover as its first players and hired Hugo López as head coach. Mills aimed for lower ticket prices at the team's games.

For the Express, head coach Bill Jones was replaced by his brother Tony Jones, who assumed the position of interim head coach until February 20, 2016. At this time, Bill was reinstated into the NBL Canada, with Tony remaining with Windsor as an assistant coach. Bill said, "What happened in that Game 7 was not Bill Jones. It happened in the heat of the moment and is something I'll probably regret for the rest of my life." Magley said that his concern with the future of the Express organization helped him make the decision to reinstate Jones, who he believed would help the team's fan support grow.

At the beginning of the new season on December 31, 2015, Clinkscales and Tony Benett were both reinstated after applying to return to the league. The two players received unanimous support from the NBL Canada Board of Governors. Bennett was only suspended for two games and received a $500 fine, while Clinkscales still had a $5,000 fine. On March 11, 2016, Rainmen player Tyrone Watson was also reinstated to the league after paying his $5,000 fine and receiving a unanimous vote. Joey Haywood would also return in the following season.

== See also ==
- 2014–15 NBL Canada season
