= Christian Upshaw =

Canadian basketball player

Christian "T-Bear" Upshaw
Personal information
- Born: October 1, 1986 Halifax, Nova Scotia, Canada
- Listed height: 6 ft 0 in (1.83 m)
- Listed weight: 185 lb (84 kg)

Career information
- High school: St. Patrick's High School (Halifax, Nova Scotia)
- College: St. Francis Xavier (2006–2011)

Christian "T-Bear" Upshaw (born October 1, 1986) is a Canadian professional basketball player who played two seasons in the National Basketball League of Canada (NBL) and one season in the American Basketball Association (ABA).

== Early life and high school career ==
Upshaw was born on October 1, 1986, and raised in the Halifax neighborhood of Mulgrave Park.

Early on, he joined the Community YMCA Panthers Basketball program. Upshaw attended Highland Park Junior High School and began to play organized basketball in Grade 8. He also played for the Africville Lakers in the Bantam (Under 14) and Midget (Under 16) boy's divisions in the local Metro Basketball Association.

Upshaw attended St. Patrick's High School in Halifax. He spent three years as a point guard for the St. Patrick's High School Fighting Irish, winning three consecutive provincial championships.

In 2005, Upshaw was named high school All-Canadian and was one of the best high school players in the country. He was selected to play in the Adidas All-Canadian High School Basketball Game.

Upshaw finished his high school athletic career by leading the St. Pat's Fighting Irish to a third consecutive provincial title. He scored 37 points to edge the Truro Cobequid Educational Centre Cougars. He was named the Halifax Metro League MVP for the 2004–05 season.

He was also a two-time 100-meter sprint champion and a football wide receiver in high school.

== University ==
Upshaw undertook an additional semester at St. Patrick's High School to meet the requirements for university admission. Upshaw was accepted to St. Francis Xavier University.

He played collegiate basketball as a 5'11" guard for the St. Francis Xavier Men's Basketball team under head coach Steve Konchalski from 2006 to 2011.

=== 2006-07 season ===
In his debut season with the St. FX X-Men, he scored 213 points in total and he led the team in steals with 33 over 18 games. He was named the St. FX Men's Basketball Rookie of the Year. Upshaw was also honored as the AUS Rookie of the Year for the 2006–2007 season. He was selected for the AUS All-Rookie Team and the CIS All-Rookie Team.

=== 2007-08 season ===
In the 2007–08 season, he finished with 278 points over 20 games and ranked second in team scoring with a 13.9 points per game average. He led the X-Men in steals with 43 (2.15 per game).

=== 2008-09 season ===
As a third-year point guard for the St. FX X-Men, he scored 362 points, averaging 19.1 points per game for the season. Upshaw led the St. FX men's basketball team in assists (4.0 per game), free-throw percentage (81.7), and three-point FG percentage (47.9). His three-point percentage ranked him second in AUS. He set a St. FX University record with nine three-pointers in a 38-point game against the Cape Breton Capers. He was awarded the St. FX Men's Basketball Team MVP and earned his first Atlantic University Sport Most Valuable Player in the 2008–2009 season.

In the summer, Upshaw was chosen, among 11 other collegiate athletes from both the CIS and NCAA, to represent the 2009 Canadian Men's Development National Team at the 2009 Summer Universiade held in Belgrade, Serbia from July 1 to 12, 2009.

=== 2009-10 season ===
In the 2009–10 season, Upshaw appeared in all 20 regular season games for the X-Men. He finished third in league scoring with a 19.5 points per game average. He also led the conference in assists (6.0 per game), ranked fourth in AUS for steals (2.3 per game) and was seventh in free-throw percentage (81.4). He was awarded the team MVP and earned his second consecutive AUS MVP award. He was also named a CIS first team All-Canadian for the second consecutive year which featured the MVPs of the nation's five conferences.

=== 2010-11 season ===
During his final season with the St. FX Men's Basketball team, he averaged 18.1 points per game, 4.8 assists per game, and 3.1 rebounds per game on 47 percent shooting. Upshaw was named the team MVP and an AUS First-Team All-Star.

== Professional career ==
=== Halifax Rainmen ===
On October 7, 2011, Upshaw was one of 17 players at the Canada Games Centre in Halifax as the Halifax Rainmen team began its pre-season training camp. Upshaw was among three Canadian athletes who competed for a position on the team. Former Halifax Rainmen President & CEO, Andre Levingston had been watching Upshaw since his first year at St. Francis Xavier University. Before the 2011–12 NBL Canada season, the Rainmen signed Upshaw to play professional basketball in the National Basketball League of Canada.

==== 2011-12 season ====
On November 3, 2011, Upshaw suffered a broken elbow when attempting a layup during the Rainmen's season opener against the London Lightning at the John Labatt Centre. In January 2012, Upshaw was removed from the injured reserve list, allowing him to participate in a regular-season game for the Halifax Rainmen against the Oshawa Power at the Metro Centre.

On March 4, 2012, he set his career high in the National Basketball League of Canada in a game against the Saint John Riptide. He contributed 12 points, 7 rebounds, 4 assists, and 2 steals in the road game victory.

In his final season as a point guard for Halifax, his team went to the league championship series, where they lost to the London Lightning in the final.

=== Moncton Miracles ===
Upshaw became a member of the Moncton Miracles after the 2012 NBL Canada draft in August 2012, when the Rainmen announced a trade sending him and Tyrone Levett to Moncton. He was officially signed by the Moncton team in September 2012 after the Miracles traded their second overall pick in the draft.

==== 2012-13 season ====
Upshaw was listed on the Moncton Miracles roster as a point guard for the 2012–13 NBL Canada season. He was released by the Miracles on November 18, 2012, early in the 40-game schedule.

=== Calgary Crush ===
==== 2014-15 season ====
Upshaw was signed to play the 2014–15 ABA season with the Calgary Crush. He was later released from the Calgary Crush in 2014. He decided to stay in Calgary after stepping away from pro basketball.

== Honors and awards ==
- Halifax Metro League MVP (2004–05)
- St. FX Men's Basketball Rookie of the Year (2006–07)
- AUS Rookie of the Year (2006–07)
- AUS All-Rookie Team (2006–07)
- CIS All-Rookie Team (2006–07)
- St. FX Men's Basketball Team MVP (2008–09 and 2009–10 and 2010–11)
- Frank Baldwin Memorial Trophy (AUS Most Valuable Player) (2008–09 and 2009–10)
- CIS First Team All-Canadian (2008–09 and 2009–10)
- AUS First Team All-Star (2008–09 and 2009–10 and 2010–11)
- Ernie Foshay Memorial Award (St. FX Invitational Tournament MVP)(2009–10)
- All-Atlantic Division Player of the Year (2010)
- St. FX Athlete of the Week (March 2011)
- 2-Time St. FX Male Athlete of the Year
