= 2015 NBL Canada Finals =

- League: NBL Canada
- Sport: Basketball
- Duration: April 15–30, 2015
- Teams: 2

Finals
- Champions: Windsor Express
- Runners-up: Halifax Rainmen
- Finals MVP: Kirk Williams

NBL Canada Finals seasons
- ← 2014 2016 →

The 2015 NBL Canada Finals was the championship series of the 2014–15 National Basketball League of Canada season and the conclusion of the season's playoffs. The Central Conference champions Windsor Express controversially won the title after Atlantic Conference champions Halifax Rainmen forfeited Game 7. The Finals began on April 15, and ended on April 30. The Express claimed their second straight title, and Kirk Williams was named Finals MVP.

== Series ==
All times are in Eastern Daylight Time (UTC-4)

=== Game 1 ===
April 15
7:00 pm

Box score

Halifax Rainmen 104, Windsor Express 113
Scoring by quarter: 22–28, 29–30, 26–22, 27–33
Pts: PJ Foster 15; Rebs: Jermaine Dailey 13; Asts: Cliff Clinkscales 3	Pts: Chris Commons 33; Rebs: Chris Commons 8 Asts: Gary Gibson 6
Windsor leads series, 1–0

WFCU Centre, Windsor, Ontario

The Express defeated the Rainmen 113–104, taking the 1–0 lead in the series. The Express got off to a strong start, holding a 28–22 lead at the end of the 1st quarter. The Rainmen, who had not played a game in 16 days, greatly struggled with fouls throughout the game. Point guard Cliff Clinkscales committed three in his first 12 minutes on the court. With nearly six minutes remaining in the second quarter, the Express led by as much as 15 points. However, following a free throw from Jermaine Dailey, the Rainmen went on a 33–20 run, taking a one-point lead in the middle of the third quarter. A three-pointer from Chris Commons with four minutes left in the third helped the Express regain their momentum and keep the game tight. At the start of the fourth quarter, the Rainmen were still only down by 3 points, and a field goal from Cliff Clinkscales tied the game with only a few minutes left in regulation. Despite the fouling out of DeAndre Thomas, the Express capped the rest of the game off by outscoring their opponents by 9 points.

Midway through the final quarter, the Rainmen's Liam McMorrow fell hard on his left shoulder and his neck snapped back. He had to be taken off the court on a stretcher and would undergo a CT scan and an MRI because he felt tingling in the injured area. Halifax, as a team, greatly struggled with fouls throughout the game. Cliff Clinkscales committed three in his first 12 minutes on the court, and every player that appeared in the game was called for more than two penalties. The Rainmen recorded a total of 48 fouls, allowing the Express to make 43 of their 55 free throw attempts. Windsor took over 10 more free throws than field goals.

=== Game 2 ===
April 17
7:00 pm

Box score

Halifax Rainmen 100, Windsor Express 93
Scoring by quarter: 32–19, 22–24, 25–26, 18–27
Pts: Tyrone Watson 16; Rebs: Young, Watson, Spikes, 9 each Asts: Kevin Young 5	Pts: Tony Bennett 25; Rebs: Jamarcus Ellis 8 Asts: Gary Gibson 7
Series tied, 1–1

WFCU Centre, Windsor, Ontario

=== Game 3 ===
April 23
7:00 pm

Box score

Halifax Rainmen 100, Windsor Express 70
Scoring by quarter: 24–13, 23–19, 24–17, 29–21
Pts: Kevin Young 17; Rebs: Young 12; Asts: Cliff Clinkscales 9	Pts: Kirk Williams 13; Rebs: Tim Parham 7 Asts: Chris Commons 3
Halifax leads series, 2–1

Scotiabank Centre, Halifax, Nova Scotia

=== Game 4 ===
April 24
7:00 pm

Box score

Halifax Rainmen 105, Windsor Express 109
Scoring by quarter: 22–29, 27–28, 26–28, 30–24
Pts: Chris Cayole 23; Rebs: Jermaine Dailey 10; Asts: Young, Ando 4 each	Pts: Kirk Williams 36; Rebs: Ryan Anderson 16; Asts: Anderson, Bennett 4 each
Series tied, 2–2

Scotiabank Centre, Halifax, Nova Scotia

=== Game 5 ===
April 26
2:00 pm

Box score

Halifax Rainmen 125, Windsor Express 91
Scoring by quarter: 30–25, 29–20, 25–25, 41–21
Pts: Chris Cayole 30; Rebs: Tyrone Watson 12; Asts: Tyrone Watson 5	Pts: Kirk Williams 20; Rebs: Ryan Anderson 15; Asts: Tony Bennett 6
Halifax leads series, 3–2

Scotiabank Centre, Halifax, Nova Scotia

=== Game 6 ===
April 28
7:00 pm

Box score

Halifax Rainmen 112, Windsor Express 119
Scoring by quarter: 28–32, 35–19, 22–34, 27–34
Pts: Seiya Ando 27; Rebs: Liam McMorrow 11; Asts: Ando, Clinkscales 3 each	Pts: Quinnel Brown 30; Rebs: Jamarcus Ellis 9 Asts: Tony Bennett 7
Series tied, 3–3

WFCU Centre, Windsor, Ontario

== Game 7 brawl ==
The deciding Game 7 of the 2015 Finals was originally scheduled to be played on April 30, 2015. The Windsor Express's shootaround was set to take place before the Halifax Rainmen's, and the Rainmen were supposed to arrive for warm-ups at approximately 1:00 PM. However, they came far too early and began warming up before their awaiting opponents had left. Express assistant coach Gerry Brumpton said, "We were here in the dark, I opened up the curtain and I looked in and there they were. They were still here working out. So they had been here for a while."

Later, Windsor head coach Bill Jones entered the Halifax locker room to retrieve a ball from one of the players, but he refused to hand the ball over. Express point guard Tony Bennett was with Jones at the time. They also asked the other team to leave the building, but they were not willing to, and an altercation ensued. According to reports, the teams hurled chairs and threw punches at each other. At around 10:40 AM, the Windsor police received a call reporting the fight, but it was already over by the time they arrived on the scene.

The Rainmen did not show up at the deciding game, and in turn, forfeited the championship. The team's front office declared that they did not feel safe taking part in the showdown after the day's events. Halifax did not respond to e-mails and messages that were sent to them. The game was officially cancelled 40 minutes before it was scheduled, and the Express organization gave refunds to fans who had paid for tickets. Bennett said, "I was told [Halifax] players refused to come and play. They didn't like the situation and what was said about some of their players. It's a black eye not just for the leagues, but for basketball, this is not supposed to happened [sic] in professional basketball." In spite of their controversial victory, hundreds of Windsor fans attended a rally on May 3, 2015. One fan said, "[The Express] were going to win it regardless. What happened was unfortunate but definitely well-deserved." Coach Jones commented, "We were there ready to play and they ended up forfeiting by the league rules."

When the Rainmen were taking their bus back to the airport, they were stopped by Vito Frijia, a member of the NBL Canada executive committee and the owner of the London Lightning, who was on his way to the WFCU Centre. He tried to convince them to play the game, but they did not listen to his demands. Frijia said, "The coach and the players decided unilaterally they were going to protest by not playing, which is totally unprofessional, and detrimental to the league, detrimental to our growing the league." When the Rainmen returned to Halifax, they discovered that they had been kicked out of their apartments, were booked for flights to outside the city, and weren't given their paychecks. Owner Andre Levingston later said in a statement, "Today is truly a black eye for our league, when the games is not safe for players to compete there is a problem. We have to do a better job of governing our league and putting principles in place where there are strict consequences."

On May 2, 2015, the Rainmen held a press conference, in which they shared the reasons for their decision to forfeit. Point guard Cliff Clinkscales claimed that the opponents played excessively physical throughout the series. He said, "There's a difference between playing physical and dirty and hurting people. We had two players in the finals that missed games because they had concussions. You understand that, concussions. I was playing with hurt ribs." Teammate Kevin Young said that he was told by some players on the Express that head coach Jones wanted them to intentionally injure particular members of the Rainmen and "take them out". Owner Levingston tried to persuade the players into ignoring the coaches, but they declined. In addition, some of Halifax's personnel said that the team packed up his belongings following the forfeit.

On May 12, 2015, Halifax player Forrest Fisher provided a more detailed account of the incident to the media through e-mail. According to him, the brawl began because Windsor coach Jones tackled Fisher's teammate Liam McMorrow. Tony Bennett then responded by throwing a chair at McMorrow, and the violence escalated. However, Jones said before he tackled the Rainman, he tried to swipe the ball from him, but the player pushed him back and "'flinched' at him as if he was going to throw a punch." Only then did he attempt to tackle him.

Player/Coach	Team	Suspension by the NBLC	Fined
Josep Clarós	Rainmen	Banned for life	$10,000
Pedro Monteiro*	Rainmen	Banned for life	$9,000
Seiya Ando	Rainmen	Suspended indefinitely	$5,000
Tony Bennett	Express	Suspended indefinitely	$5,000
Chris Cayole	Rainmen	Suspended indefinitely	$5,000
Cliff Clinkscales	Rainmen	Suspended indefinitely	$5,000
Jermaine Dailey	Rainmen	Suspended indefinitely	$5,000
Forrest Fisher	Rainmen	Suspended indefinitely	$5,000
Pedro Foster	Rainmen	Suspended indefinitely	$5,000
Joel Haywood	Rainmen	Suspended indefinitely	$5,000
Liam McMorrow	Rainmen	Suspended indefinitely	$5,000
Nigel Spikes	Rainmen	Suspended indefinitely	$5,000
Tyrone Watson	Rainmen	Suspended indefinitely	$5,000
Kevin Young	Rainmen	Suspended indefinitely	$5,000
Bill Jones	Express	Suspended one season	$4,000
* received $4,000 fine later in the investigation, following an initial $5,000 fine

== Charges ==
The NBL Canada fined those involved in the brawl a total of $90,000, saying in a statement the following day, "The league takes this incident very seriously and we are working to address the matter to ensure it never happens in the future, and so that those who were responsible are held accountable." The Halifax Rainmen, as an organization, were fined $20,000, while its head coach Josep Clarós faced a $10,000 fine and was banned for life from coaching in the league. He was named NBLC Coach of the Year weeks before. Assistant coach Pedro Monteiro and eleven of his players also faced fines of $5,000. Monteiro was barred from the NBL Canada as well as Clarós, and the players were suspended indefinitely from playing there while an investigation took place. In the following days, the assistant was fined an additional $4,000, because of "conduct detrimental to the league," but claimed the punishment was "unfair" and "the investigation was not thorough." He said, "I have not been contacted during any supposed investigation into the events on the morning of Game 7."
