= Tyler Richards (basketball) =

Canadian basketball player

Personal information
- Born: May 27, 1986 Halifax, Nova Scotia, Canada
- Died: April 17, 2016 (aged 29) Halifax, Nova Scotia, Canada
- Listed height: 6 ft 2 in (1.88 m)
- Listed weight: 185 lb (84 kg)

Career information
- High school: St. Patrick's High School (Halifax, Nova Scotia)
- College: St. Francis Xavier (2004–2009)

Tyler Bradley Richards (May 27, 1986 – April 17, 2016) was a former Canadian professional basketball player who played two seasons for the Halifax Rainmen of the National Basketball League of Canada (NBL) as a combo guard. He was also one of the top high school basketball players in Canada and played at the collegiate level with St. Francis Xavier University.

== Early life and high school career ==
Tyler Richards was born and raised in the Halifax, Nova Scotia neighborhood of Mulgrave Park on May 27, 1986. He attended St. Joseph’s-Alexander McKay Elementary School and Highland Park Junior High School, where he played basketball. Growing up, Richards also played for the Community Y Panthers basketball team.

Richards attended St. Patrick’s High School in Halifax. He led the St. Patrick's Fighting Irish basketball team to Nova Scotia provincial titles three years in a row. In his Grade 12 year, Richards was All-Canadian and one of the top high school players in the country. He graduated from St. Patrick's High School in 2003.

== University ==
=== St. Francis Xavier University ===
Richards was accepted to St. Francis Xavier University, in Antigonish, on a basketball scholarship. He played university basketball as a guard for the St. Francis Xavier University men's basketball team under head coach Steve Konchalski. Standing at 6’2”, Richards wore the jersey number 23.

==== 2004–05 season ====
He was named St. FX Men's Basketball "Rookie of the Year" for the 2004-2005 season. On March 12, 2005, the St. FX Men's Basketball team won the AUS Championship against the Saint Mary's Huskies in Halifax. The team advanced to the National Championship Tournament, making it to the CIS Semifinal before losing to the Carleton Ravens.

==== 2005–06 season ====
In the 2005-06 season, Richard led the X-Men in scoring with 302 points over 20 games, averaging 15.1 per game. On March 11, 2006, the St. Francis Xavier X-Men won the Atlantic University Sport (AUS) championship game against the Cape Breton Capers. Richards and the St. FX Men's basketball team advanced to compete in the National Championship Tournament. The team made it to the CIS semifinals before suffering a four-point loss to the Victoria Vikes. Richards was named St. FX Men's Basketball "Most Improved Player" and an AUS First Team All-Star.

==== 2006–07 season ====
In the 2006-07 season, he ranked second in team scoring with 333 points over 20 games, averaging 16.6 per game. Richards was named an AUS First Team All-Star. He also received the Ernie Foshay Memorial Award as the MVP at the annual St. FX Invitational Tournament.

==== 2007–08 season ====
In the 2007-08 season, he led the X-Men in scoring with 394 points over 20 games, averaging 19.7 per game. Richards was awarded with the St. FX Men's Basketball Team MVP and received his third AUS First Team All-Star.

==== 2008–09 season ====
He returned for his fifth and final year at St. Francis Xavier University for the 2008-2009 season. Richards was second in the AUS conference in scoring for the season averaging 19.6 points-per-game and finished second in the conference in steals with 2.60 per game. He received First Team Atlantic University Sport All-star for a fourth consecutive season.

He finished his AUS basketball career with 1526 points in 96 regular season games.

==== Legal issues ====
In February 2009, Richards and two other members of the St. Francis Xavier University men's basketball team were charged with assault causing bodily harm. The criminal charges related to a late-night incident in Antigonish, Nova Scotia that hospitalized a man.

In the following month of March, Richards and the two other players facing charges were not allowed to play in the 2009 Subway Atlantic University Sport Final 6 Men's Basketball Championship held at the Halifax Metro Centre. The X-Men were initially seeded as the top team in the AUS conference championship tournament. However, in the AUS championship game, they suffered a defeat to Dalhousie Tigers, all while missing their leading scorer, Tyler Richards, who was sidelined due to assault charges stemming from the incident that occurred on February 21.

== Professional career ==
=== Halifax Rainmen ===
Rainmen owner Andre Levingston reached out to Richards and offered him a second chance at playing basketball in the National Basketball League of Canada.

==== 2012-13 season ====
In November 2012, it was announced that the Halifax Rainmen signed Richards for their upcoming 2012–13 NBL Canada season. He played 31 games before the regular season closed in March 2013.

==== 2013-14 season ====
In September 2013, Richards re-signed to play the 2013–14 NBL Canada season with the Halifax Rainmen. The regular season began in November 2013, however, Richards faced an indefinite suspension in December 2013 due to an assault charge.

Richards was released from the Rainmen on December 27, 2013, after he was arrested and charged with drug trafficking and weapons-related offences in a separate criminal investigation.

== Death ==
Tyler Richards died on April 17, 2016, at the age of 29 in Halifax. His death was ruled a homicide. Richards was the city of Halifax's fifth homicide of 2016.

== Honors and awards ==
- St. FX Men's Basketball Rookie of the Year (2004–05)
- St. FX Men's Basketball Most Improved Player (2005–06)
- Atlantic University Sport (AUS) First Team All-Star (2005–06, 2006–07, 2007–08 and 2008–09)
- Atlantic University Sport (AUS) Champion (2005–06)
- Ernie Foshay Memorial Award (St. FX Invitational Tournament MVP) (2006–07)
- St. FX Men's Basketball Team MVP (2007–08)
- St. FX Athlete of the Week (February 2009)
- Richards was memorialized in a mural completed in the Northend Halifax neighborhood of Mulgrave Park. (2016)
