= 2014–15 Windsor Express season =

Windsor Express
2014–15 season
- Owner: Dartis Willis, Sr.
- Head coach: Bill Jones
- Arena: WFCU Centre
- Central Division: 1st (21–11 record [.656])
- Playoffs: NBL Canada Champions (won 4–3)

The 2014–15 Windsor Express season was the third season of the franchise in the National Basketball League of Canada. The Express finished the season with a 21–11 record and won the 2015 Finals in a controversial manner, with the opposing Halifax Rainmen forfeiting Game 7 after a pre-game brawl. They won their second consecutive title, becoming the second team to do so after the London Lightning under Micheal Ray Richardson. Head coach Bill Jones also won back-to-back titles.

== Draft ==
Round	Pick	Player	Position	Nationality	College
2	16	Robert Dewar	Center	Canada	Alberta
3	24	Trent Tornincasa	Shooting guard	Canada	Glenville State

== Roster ==
Note: Flags indicate national team eligibility at FIBA-sanctioned events. Players may hold other non-FIBA nationalities not displayed.

Windsor Express roster
Players
Coaches

Pos.	No.	Nat.	Name	Ht.	Wt.	Age
C	2	(United States)	Thomas, DeAndre	2.03 m (6 ft 8 in)	300 lb (140 kg)	40 – 28 September 1986
G/F	4	(United States)	Ellis, Jamarcus	1.96 m (6 ft 5 in)	200 lb (91 kg)	41 – 7 August 1985
G	5	(Canada)	Collins, Josh	1.85 m (6 ft 1 in)	170 lb (77 kg)	36 – 5 August 1990
F	10	(Canada)	Loiselle, Kevin	1.98 m (6 ft 6 in)	225 lb (102 kg)
G	12	(United States)	Bennett, Tony	1.85 m (6 ft 1 in)	175 lb (79 kg)	42 – 22 August 1984
G	14	(Canada)	Gibson, Gary	1.88 m (6 ft 2 in)	185 lb (84 kg)	39 – 1 December 1986
F	15	(United States)	Brown, Quinnel	1.98 m (6 ft 6 in)	210 lb (95 kg)	43 – 26 August 1983
G/F	22	(Canada)	McQueen, Jahmal	2.00 m (6 ft 7 in)	210 lb (95 kg)	37 – 24 October 1989
F	24	(United States)	Commons, Chris	2.06 m (6 ft 9 in)	220 lb (100 kg)	41 – 8 December 1984
F	32	(United States)	Williams, Kirk	2.01 m (6 ft 7 in)	200 lb (91 kg)	38 – 19 December 1987
F/C	40	(United States)	Parham, Tim	2.06 m (6 ft 9 in)	240 lb (110 kg)	43 – 18 March 1983
G	44	(United States)	Anderson, Ryan	1.93 m (6 ft 4 in)	194 lb (88 kg)	38 – 19 December 1987

Head coach

- (United States) Bill Jones

Assistant coach(es)

- (Canada) Gerry Brumpton
- (United States) Aaron McDonald
- (United States) Scott Newman
- (United States) Lexa Page

Legend

- (C) Team captain
- Injured
