= Tony Jones (basketball) =

American basketball coach & player

Oakland Golden Grizzlies
- Position: Assistant coach
- League: Horizon League

Personal information
- Born: Detroit, Michigan, U.S.

Career information
- High school: Southwestern (Detroit, Michigan)
- College: Fisk (1978–1981)
- Coaching career: 1986–present

Career history

Coaching
- 1986–1991: Southwestern HS
- 1993–1996: Buffalo (asst.)
- 1996–2001: Toledo (asst.)
- 2001–2005: Milwaukee (asst.)
- 2005–2011: Tennessee (assoc. HC)
- 2011–2013: Alcoa HS
- 2014–2015: Auburn (assoc. HC)
- 2015–2016: Windsor Express (interim HC/asst.)
- 2017–present: Oakland (asst.)

Tony Jones is an American basketball coach and former player. He is currently an assistant coach for the Oakland Golden Grizzlies men's basketball program. He had most recently served as interim head coach for the Windsor Express of the National Basketball League of Canada (NBL).

== Playing career ==
Jones attended Southwestern High School in Detroit, Michigan. He earned All-City honors as a basketball player and became known as the team's star. He attended Fisk University in Nashville, Tennessee, where he garnered All-Conference accolades. Jones later attended Concordia University in Ann Arbor, Michigan.

== Coaching career ==
Jones began coaching basketball in 1986, when he returned to his alma mater to direct the Detroit Southwestern basketball program. He served as an assistant for the varsity team and the head coach for the junior varsity team. At Southwestern, Jones had experience working with the likes of Jalen Rose, Howard Eisley, and Voshon Lenard. He led them to a USA Today mythical national championship in 1991.

Later on, he began coaching Team AAU Michigan, a post that he would hold until 1993, when he secured an assistant coaching position at the University at Buffalo. Jones moved on to Toledo University in 1996 and then the University of Wisconsin–Milwaukee in 2001. At Milwaukee, he coached his first games with Bruce Pearl, who he would stick with when he coached at the University of Tennessee and Auburn University, whom he would join in 2005 and 2014 respectively.

On July 14, 2015, Jones assumed his position as interim head coach with the Express following the suspension of original coach, his brother Bill Jones, in the midst of the 2015 NBL Canada Finals brawl. Tony said, "[Bill and I] haven't been together for a year in over 25 years. Either I was coaching collegiately, he was playing professionally at different levels, or he was coaching." Jones coached the Express for 20 games and a 10–10 record until his brother's suspension was lifted. Jones remained as assistant coach for the rest of the season.

Jones was hired as assistant coach for the Oakland Golden Grizzlies men's basketball team for the 2017–18 season. He replaced assistant Cornell Mann who left the program to become assistant coach at Missouri.

== Personal ==
Jones is the brother of Bill Jones, a former National Basketball Association (NBA) player for the New Jersey Nets. Tony replaced Bill for a portion of one season as the coach of the Windsor Express in 2015.
