= Kirk Snyder =

American basketball player (born 1983)

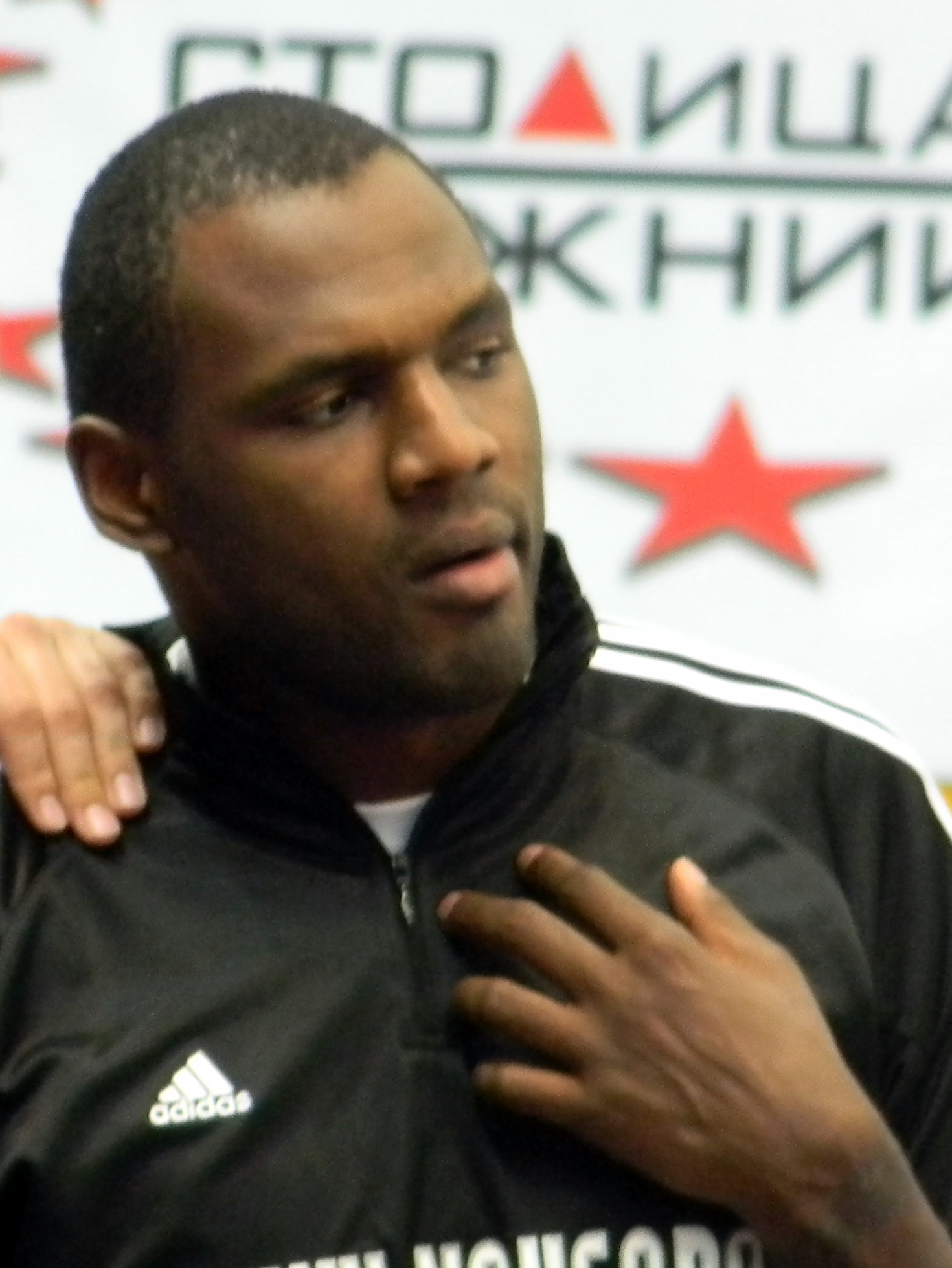
- Snyder in 2011

Personal information
- Born: June 5, 1983 (age 43) Los Angeles, California, U.S.
- Listed height: 6 ft 6 in (1.98 m)
- Listed weight: 225 lb (102 kg)

Career information
- High school: Upland (Upland, California)
- College: Nevada (2001–2004)
- NBA draft: 2004: 1st round, 16th overall pick
- Drafted by: Utah Jazz
- Playing career: 2004–2011
- Position: Shooting guard / small forward
- Number: 3, 1, 13, 30

Career history
- 2004–2005: Utah Jazz
- 2005–2006: New Orleans/Oklahoma City Hornets
- 2006–2008: Houston Rockets
- 2008: Minnesota Timberwolves
- 2008–2009: Zhejiang Horses
- 2011: Halifax Rainmen
- 2011: BC Nizhny Novgorod
- 2011: Reales de La Vega

Career highlights
- WAC Player of the Year (2004); 2× First-team All-WAC (2003, 2004)
- Stats at NBA.com
- Stats at Basketball Reference

Kirk Patrick Snyder (born June 5, 1983) is an American former professional basketball player who played four seasons in the National Basketball Association (NBA). He played college basketball for the Nevada Wolf Pack.

== College career ==
Snyder grew up in Upland, California, and spent his college career at University of Nevada, Reno. In 2004, he led the Wolf Pack to its first Sweet 16 in the NCAA tournament. During that trip, the team beat No. 2 seed Gonzaga and No. 7 seed Michigan State, but lost in the third round to No. 3 and eventual national runner-up Georgia Tech.

== Professional career ==
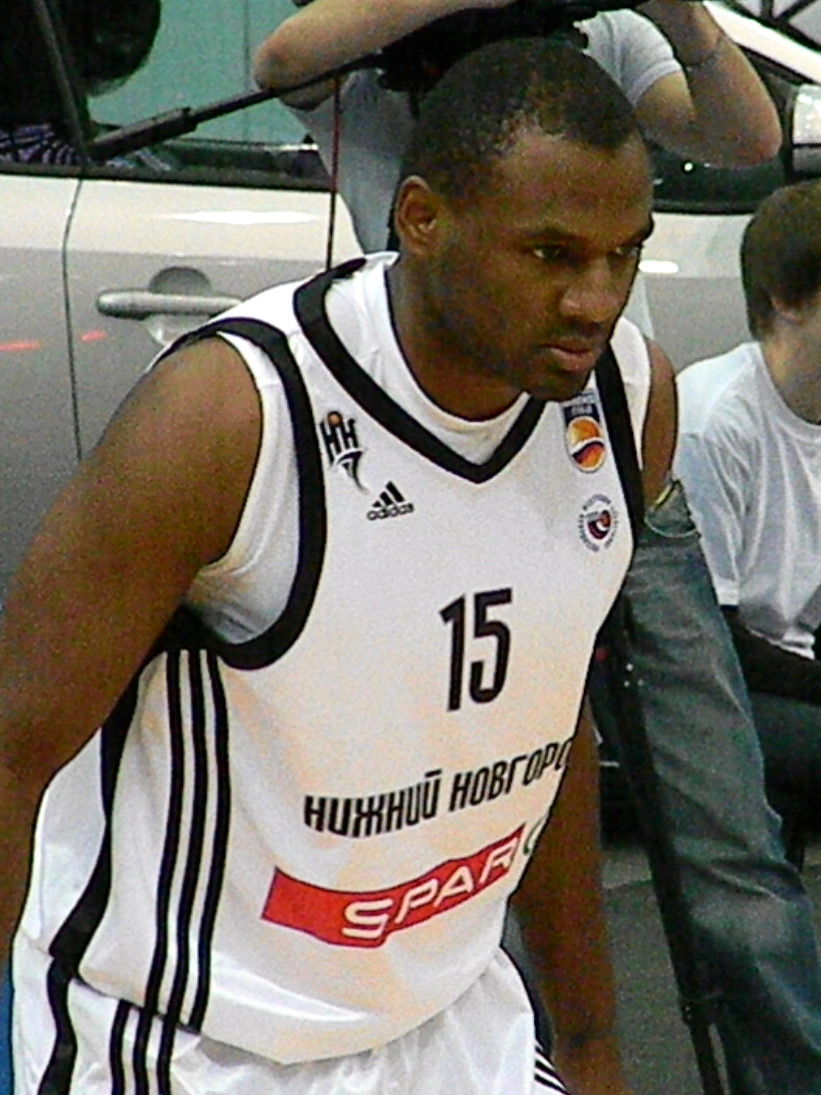
Snyder with BC Nizhny Novgorod in 2011

Snyder was drafted in the first round (16th overall) of the 2004 NBA draft by the Utah Jazz. After one season, he was traded to the New Orleans Hornets as part one of the largest trades in NBA history (13 players, 5 teams involved).

In New Orleans, Snyder became a starter midway through his only season. He scored a career-high 28 points against the Minnesota Timberwolves, and averaged nearly 20 minutes per game in 68 contests. After that, he was traded to the Houston Rockets for a 2008 second-round draft pick and cash considerations.

On February 21, 2008, as he was often the last man from the Rockets' bench, Snyder was traded to the Minnesota Timberwolves along with a 2010 second-round draft pick and cash considerations for Gerald Green.

His stint with the Timberwolves ended up being his last playing days in the NBA throughout his professional career. Snyder's final NBA game was played on April 16, 2008, in a 110 - 101 victory over the Milwaukee Bucks where he recorded 6 points, 3 rebounds and 2 assists. Coincidentally, Bucks' guard Awvee Storey also played his final NBA game during this matchup, recording 7 points, 4 rebounds and 1 assist.

During the 2008 off-season, Snyder signed with the Chinese Basketball Association's Zhejiang Horses.

Snyder later joined the Halifax Rainmen of the Premier Basketball League (PBL). After playing three games for Halifax in late January, 2011, they waived him.

In March 2011 he signed with BC Nizhny Novgorod in Russia until the end of the season, but left the team in April for personal reasons.

== Personal life ==
Snyder married his college sweetheart Haley Dahl, and has three children. Haley is the cousin of NFL offensive line guard Harvey Dahl, who also attended Nevada, and played Wolf Pack football there. Snyder and Dahl have since divorced.

Snyder was arrested on March 30, 2009, after he allegedly broke into a Warren County, Ohio home and assaulted a man, sheriff deputies said. He was charged with aggravated burglary; he pleaded not guilty by reason of insanity at a March 31, 2009 hearing and was held on $500,000 bail.

He was subsequently convicted and sentenced to three years in jail and fined $5,550 in restitution. He was released early and signed with the Halifax Rainmen in Canada. Andre Levingston, the owner of the team, said, "Everybody makes mistakes, but I don't think they should be crucified for the rest of their life. You pay your debt to society and you humble yourself and you learn from your mistakes. So everybody deserves a second chance, maybe a third chance."

== NBA career statistics ==
Legend
GP	Games played	GS	Games started	MPG	Minutes per game
FG%	Field goal percentage	3P%	3-point field goal percentage	FT%	Free throw percentage
RPG	Rebounds per game	APG	Assists per game	SPG	Steals per game
BPG	Blocks per game	PPG	Points per game	**Bold**	Career high

=== Regular season ===
Year	Team	GP	GS	MPG	FG%	3P%	FT%	RPG	APG	SPG	BPG	PPG
2004–05	Utah	**68**	7	13.3	.372	.353	.667	1.8	.5	.4	.3	5.0
2005–06	NO/Oklahoma City	**68**	**45**	19.3	.453	**.357**	.735	2.4	1.5	.4	.3	8.0
2006–07	Houston	39	1	14.4	.452	.250	.653	2.1	1.0	.3	.3	4.9
2007–08	Houston	9	0	9.0	.464	.222	.545	1.3	.9	.1	.1	3.8
2007–08	Minnesota	27	18	**25.2**	**.516**	.214	**.753**	**4.2**	**2.1**	**.7**	**.5**	**8.4**
Career		211	71	16.8	.438	.327	.699	2.3	1.1	.4	.3	6.3

=== Playoffs ===
Year	Team	GP	GS	MPG	FG%	3P%	FT%	RPG	APG	SPG	BPG	PPG
2007	Houston	3	0	3.0	.333	.000	.000	.3	.0	.0	.0	.7
Career		3	0	3.0	.333	.000	.000	.3	.0	.0	.0	.7
