= Tyrone Watson =

Canadian basketball player (born 1990)

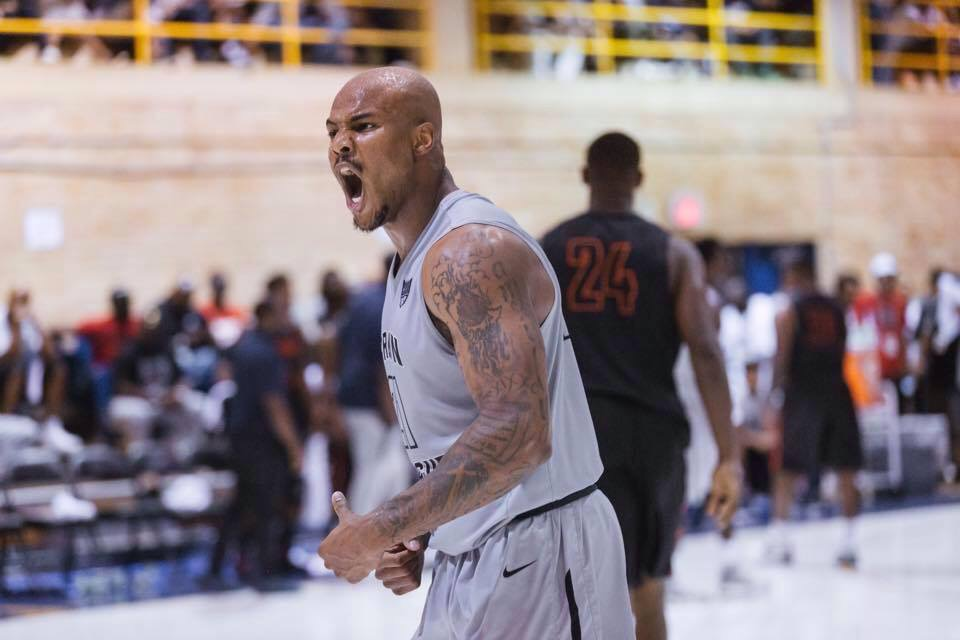

Personal information
- Born: July 12, 1990 (age 35) Hamilton, Canada
- Listed height: 6 ft 5 in (1.96 m)
- Listed weight: 225 lb (102 kg)

Career information
- High school: Cathedral (Hamilton, Ontario)
- College: New Mexico State (2008–2013)
- NBA draft: 2013: undrafted
- Playing career: 2013–2020
- Position: Forward
- Number: 1

Career history
- 2014–2016: Halifax Rainmen
- 2015–2016: Al-Muharraq
- 2016: Orangeville A's
- 2016–2019: Halifax Hurricanes
- 2019–2020: St. John's Edge

Career highlights
- NBL Canada Canadian of the Year (2015)
Medals
Men's basketball
Representing Canada
FIBA Americas U18 Championship
Bronze medal – third place	2008 Formosa	National team

Tyrone Watson (born July 12, 1990) is a Canadian former professional basketball player. He attended New Mexico State University, where he represented the Aggies, and has competed with the Canadian youth national team in the past. Following graduation, Watson played a season with the Halifax Rainmen in the NBL Canada and, following a suspension, returned to the league with the Orangeville A's.

== Professional career ==
Watson was named NBLC Canadian of the Year after the 2014–15 season, but was fined $5,000 and suspended indefinitely "for conduct detrimental to the league," after his team forfeited Game 7 of the 2015 NBL Canada Finals due to a pre-game brawl. In 2014, he was named North of the Border Basketball League (NBBL) Most Valuable Player. The NBBL is the top summer league in Canada.

On October 9, 2015, Watson signed with Al-Muharraq of the Bahraini Premier League. It was his first professional contract with a team outside of Canada. But on March 11, 2016, he was reinstated to the NBL Canada and signed with the Orangeville A's. In his debut on March 11, Watson led the A's to a win over the Windsor Express, posting 18 points and nine rebounds and being named Player of the Game.

Watson averaged 11.6 points, 5.6 rebounds, and 3.8 assists per game for the St. John's Edge during the 2019-20 season. He was named to the NBL Canada All-Canadian First Team.

== International career ==
In the summer of 2008, Watson competed with the Canadian national team at the FIBA Americas Under-18 Championship. He also played on the international stage in the Nike Global Challenge, leading his team to a bronze medal.
