= Liam McMorrow =

Canadian basketball player (born 1987)

Personal information
- Born: July 22, 1987 (age 39) Vancouver, British Columbia, Canada
- Listed height: 7 ft 2 in (2.18 m)
- Listed weight: 290 lb (132 kg)

Career information
- High school: West Hill Collegiate Institute (Toronto, Ontario)
- College: Durham College (2007–2008); Tennessee Tech (2010–2012)
- NBA draft: 2012: undrafted
- Playing career: 2012–2019
- Position: Center

Career history
- 2012–2013: Iowa Energy
- 2013–2014: Bank of Taiwan
- 2015: Halifax Rainmen
- 2015: Barako Bull Energy
- 2015: Jiangsu Monkey King
- 2016: Yulon Dinos
- 2016–2017: Fubon Braves
- 2017: Bank of Taiwan
- 2017–2018: Taiwan Beer
- 2018: Obras Sanitarias
- 2019: Oklahoma City Blue
- 2019: Hunan Jinjian Rice Industry
- 2019: Formosa Dreamers
- Stats at Basketball Reference

Liam Paul McMorrow (born July 22, 1987) is a Canadian born former professional basketball player.

== Player profile ==
McMorrow is a former ice hockey player in his native Canada who only took up basketball seriously in 2008. He played college basketball at Marquette University and Tennessee Tech. He went undrafted in the 2012 NBA draft but has since shown a lot of improvement in stints in leagues around the world. His most recent stint was with the Halifax Rainmen of NBL Canada, where his team lost Game Seven of their championship game against Windsor Express by forfeiture. The Rainmen refused to play the deciding Game Seven at the Windsor Express’ home floor in Windsor, Ontario for "fear of their safety", following the 2015 NBL Canada Finals brawl.

In June 2015, McMorrow joined the Los Angeles Clippers summer league team which participated in the 2015 NBA Summer League Orlando League.

In October 2019, McMorrow joined the Formosa Dreamers of the ASEAN Basketball League.

== The Basketball Tournament ==
Liam McMorrow played for Team Eberlein Drive in the 2018 edition of The Basketball Tournament. Eberlein Drive made it to the championship game before falling to Overseas Elite.

== Personal life ==
McMorrow is the youngest of four children. He is the son of Sheila McMorrow. His brother, Sean, was a professional hockey player.
