= Adidas All-Canadian High School Basketball Game =

Annual allstar basketball event in Canadian high schools

- Frequency: Annual
- Location: Ontario, Canada
- Years active: 2004-2006
- Attendance: 2,000-5,000+

The Adidas All-Canadian Basketball Game was an annual all-star game sponsored by Adidas that featured the top Canadian high school basketball prospects. The first annual event was held in May 2004 at the Hershey Centre in Mississauga.

The top 50 Canadian senior-level high school basketball players were nominated for the event. The initial list was gathered by the Canadian Sports and Media Group and experts from across the country, including college, university and high school coaches, media members, provincial sports organizations and general high school basketball experts. In addition, every major basketball publication in Canada was reviewed. The top 20 players were selected as finalists to play in the national high school all-star basketball game. The selection committee also determined the game's final lineups after they narrowed the top 50 list to twenty names.

== History ==
=== 1st Annual Adidas All-Canadian ===
The first Adidas All-Canadian game was played on May 8, 2004, at the Hershey Centre in Mississauga. The game aired live on cable sports channel The Score and it was the first-ever nationally televised game featuring the top rising high school talent across Canada. Players had the opportunity to compete in front of approximately 5,000 fans, along with scouts from top Canadian and American universities. The event featured a three-point shootout, a slam dunk competition, and an all-star game.

Oakville's Ivan Chiriaev was named the game's most valuable player as the leading scorer with a game-high of 17 points.

=== 2nd Annual Adidas All-Canadian ===
The second annual Adidas-sponsored event was televised on TSN in April 2005 and took place at the Hershey Centre in Mississauga.

=== 3rd Annual Adidas All-Canadian ===
The organizers of the third annual Adidas All-Canadian event selected East and West teams from a list of the top 100 high school players across Canada. In March 2006, the Adidas All-Canadian Game East Vs. West took place at the Cathedral High School in Hamilton. Over 2,100 basketball fans packed the venue to witness the East beat the 10-player West squad 96–83.
