= Windsor Police Service =

Police service in Windsor, Ontario, Canada

- Windsor Police shoulder flash
- Abbreviation: WPS
- Motto: Honour in Service

Agency overview
- Formed: July 1, 1867
- Preceding agency: Royal Canadian Rifle Regiment
- Annual budget: $84 million

Jurisdictional structure
- Operations jurisdiction: Canada
- Population: 217,195
- Legal jurisdiction: As per operations jurisdiction
- General nature: Local civilian police

Operational structure
- Overseen by: Windsor Police Services Board
- Headquarters: 150 Goyeau Street; Windsor, Ontario; N9A 6V2
- Sworn members: 473
- Unsworn members: 154
- Elected officer responsible: Michael Kerzner, Solicitor General
- Agency executive: Jason Crowley, Chief of Police

Website
- Official website

The Windsor Police Service is the municipal law enforcement agency in Windsor, Ontario, Canada. It succeeded the Royal Canadian Rifle Regiment.

Since 2019, the Windsor Police Service has also provided contract policing services for the nearby Town of Amherstburg. In 2021, it submitted a proposal to provide policing services for the Municipality of Leamington. The municipality rejected the proposal and continues to be served by the Ontario Provincial Police.

The current chief of police is Jason Crowley, who previously served as a deputy chief and acting chief before being appointed to the role in January 2026.

Windsor Police Services is among police forces with the highest number of human rights complaints in Ontario. Specifically, they have been the subject of the highest number of formal complaints regarding sexual misconduct and reprisal. They have also been the subject of high-profile cases of assault against civilians. In 2020, amidst rising demands for police abolition across North America, a campaign was launched to defund the Windsor Police Services.

== Organization ==
The Windsor Police Service headquarters is located at 150 Goyeau Street in downtown Windsor. The building incorporates an Ontario Court of Justice courthouse.

In addition, the service maintains secondary sites:

- Major FA Tilston Armoury & Police Training Centre, 4007 Sandwich St. (shared with the Department of National Defence)
- Sandwich Community Services, 3312 Sandwich St.
- Collision Reporting Centre, 2696 Jefferson Blvd.

The police service employs 473 sworn members and 153 civilian members. The organization is divided into two areas: Operations and Operational Support.

=== Operations ===
==== Emergency 911 Centre ====
The Windsor Police Emergency 911 Centre handles all incoming 911 calls in the City of Windsor. It dispatches police officers, while calls for fire and EMS are routed to their respective agencies. The Emergency 911 Centre co-operates with the Canadian Coast Guard, Canada Border Services Agency and U.S. Customs and Border Protection.

==== Investigations ====
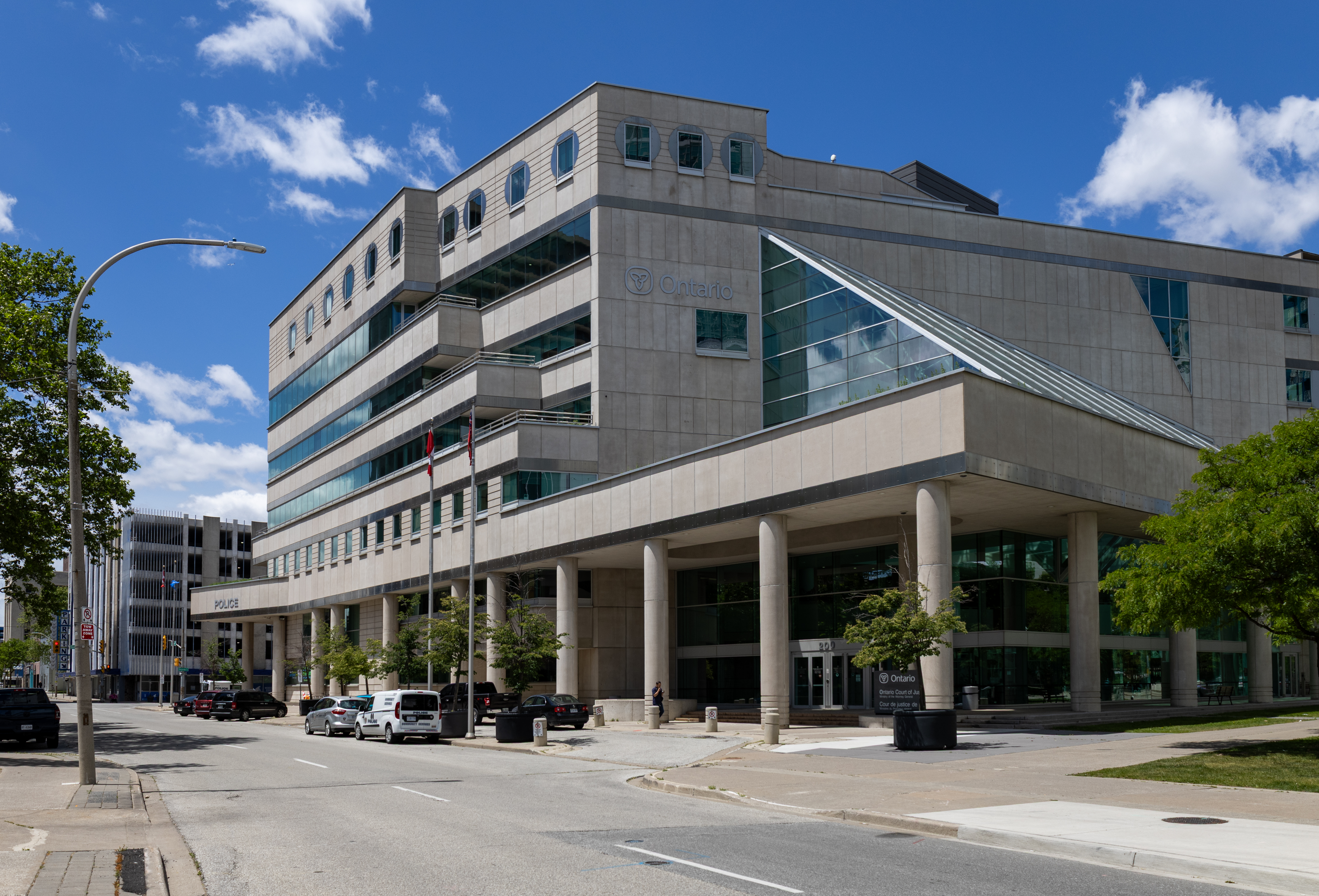
Windsor Police Service headquarters, located at 150 Goyeau St.

Some investigations and teams include:

- Major Crimes Unit
- Special Victims Unit
- Downtown directed patrol
- Crisis Outreach and Support Team (COAST)
- Court Operations
- Emergency Services Unit
- Explosive Disposal Unit
- Marine Unit
- Police Dog Unit
- Traffic Branch
- Collision Reporting Centre

=== Windsor Police Pipe Band ===
The Windsor Police Pipe Band was founded in 1967. The band performs at a variety of community events, including parades, police memorial services and funerals. Two groups also compete under the Windsor Police's name in grade 3 and 5.

== Controversies ==
=== David Van Buskirk and the Assault of Dr. Abouhassan ===
In April 2010, Windsor Detective David van Buskirk assaulted Dr. Tyceer Abouhassan, an endocrinologist, in an unprovoked attack in a parking lot on McDougall St. outside Dr. Abouhassan's workplace. Dr. Abouhassan was left with a concussion, broken nose, bruised ribs, and a detached retina, requiring emergency surgery. Van Buskirk initially filed a police report stating that Dr. Abouhassan had attacked him, and police filed charges against Abouhassan for assaulting a peace officer. Those charges were dismissed by the court later that year. In 2012, a video was uncovered which showed the assault on film. Van Buskirk then retracted his earlier statements and pleaded guilty to assault.

As the case developed, Windsor Star reported several previous cases of police brutality perpetrated by Van Buskirk and other officers named in the case. Between 1993 and 1994, there were at least four cases of Van Buskirk assaulting civilians and then charging them with obstruction or assault. In the first case, in 1993, Van Buskirk and another officer apprehended a man sleeping in his car and beat him severely. In the second, in 1994, Van Buskirk, working as a breathalyzer technician, roughhandled a man who alleged wrongful arrest, dislocating his shoulder. In both cases Buskirk's charges were thrown out of court. Both victims filed lawsuits against Van Buskirk and both suits were settled out of court.

In 1994, Van Buskirk was accused, along with other officers, of beating three handcuffed men while taunting them with racial slurs. Two victims were charged with obstructing police, but were acquitted. One sued, but dropped his case for unknown reasons. Windsor police said Van Buskirk would be criminally charged with assault for the incident, but the case was never disclosed and the Police subsequently refused to comment when questioned by journalists.

In 1998 Van Buskirk pleaded guilty to discreditable conduct and neglect of duty, for accompanying two topless Michigan women into a hotel room with a fellow officer, and telling headquarters they were on call for the ensuing five hours. He was docked 60 hours pay. Abouhassan's lawyer expressed disbelief that Van Buskirk would not receive a suspension for any of the above incidents.

Sgt. Mike LaPorte, a former Police Union executive, was the officer who filed the assault charges against Dr. Abouhassan in 2010. At the time he had retired and was therefore not subject to Police Act charges. LaPorte had his own track record of misconduct, previously engaging in a hit and run in 1993, hitting two parked cars after leaving a bar run by the Police Union.

In the midst of the lawsuit launched by Dr. Abouhassan against the police, then-chief Gary Smith announced an early retirement, to be replaced by Al Frederick. Van Buskirk was ultimately sentenced to 5 months in jail after pleading guilty to assault causing bodily harm.

=== Missing cocaine evidence in 2013 ===
In 2017, a court decision revealed that the Windsor Police Service had lost twenty-five thousand dollars' worth of cocaine from their evidence vault in 2013. Chief Al Frederick claimed to have alerted the Police Services Board to the missing drugs in 2013, although board members told CBC News they could not recall being informed. Frederick claimed that the drugs were likely accidentally incinerated, rather than stolen.

=== Shooting of Matthew Mahoney ===
In March 2018, two unnamed Windsor Police officers shot and killed 33 year-old Matthew Mahoney, a man experiencing mental health crisis and wielding a knife in a McDonalds. Mahoney was shot a total of seven times. In 2019 the Special Investigations Unit cleared the officers of any wrongdoing. Mahoney's brother said he was diagnosed with schizophrenia and other health issues, and often "called the police to ask for help but had trouble expressing himself." They called for a coroner's inquest, claiming the SIU report was insufficient.

=== Domestic disturbance call to Chief Frederick's house ===
In 2019, it was reported that a domestic disturbance 911 hang-up call was made from Windsor Police Chief Al Frederick's Windsor home. It was reported that Frederick and his wife Simone were the only people normally living in the home. CBC investigators raised questions about transparency and how the police handled the situation. Mayor Drew Dilkens dismissed concerns and claimed the call was "not of a criminal nature".

=== May 2019 incident ===
The family of a 27-year-old Windsor man issued a complaint that officers used excessive force when arresting him in May 2019. The man claimed he was assaulted both during his arrest and after being detained in a police vehicle. Footage showed the man in a transport vehicle swallowing blood and in severe pain and discomfort. The SIU cleared officers of any wrongdoing, claiming that while the man was struck to the body and head, that officers used necessary force to detain him. Police claimed they believed the man was armed, although it was later revealed he was not.
