= Mulgrave Park =

- Neighbourhood
- Location within Nova Scotia
- Country: Canada
- Province: Nova Scotia
- Municipality: Halifax Regional Municipality
- Community: Halifax

Area
  - Total: 4.5 ha (11 acres)

Population
  - Total: 680
- Area code: 782, 902

Mulgrave Park is a residential neighbourhood in North End Halifax, Nova Scotia. It consists of local public housing along Barrington Street. It is also referred to as MGP by most residents.

The 351 unit development was completed in October 1960, after which Mulgrave Park won numerous awards for its quality. The neighbourhood houses several large murals, visible from Barrington Street, one of Halifax's main arterial roads.

== Geography ==
The neighbourhood of Mulgrave Park is walkable, and is about 11 acres (4.5 ha) in landmass.

== Demographics ==
In 2016, the neighbourhood (more specifically Census Dissemination Area 12090847) was home to 680 residents. The population is 62% Black, making it the neighbourhood with the highest concentration of African Canadians on the Halifax Peninsula. Many of the community members are Black Nova Scotians with roots in Africville, a former settlement located across the street from Mulgrave Park. Africville was demolished by the former City of Halifax in the late 1960s, in the name of urban renewal. Nearly 20% of Mulgrave Park residents were born outside of Canada, this includes those of Sudanese, Congolese, Irish, Italian, Hungarian, French, Arab and Jamaican origins.
