= Chris Cayole =

American basketball player

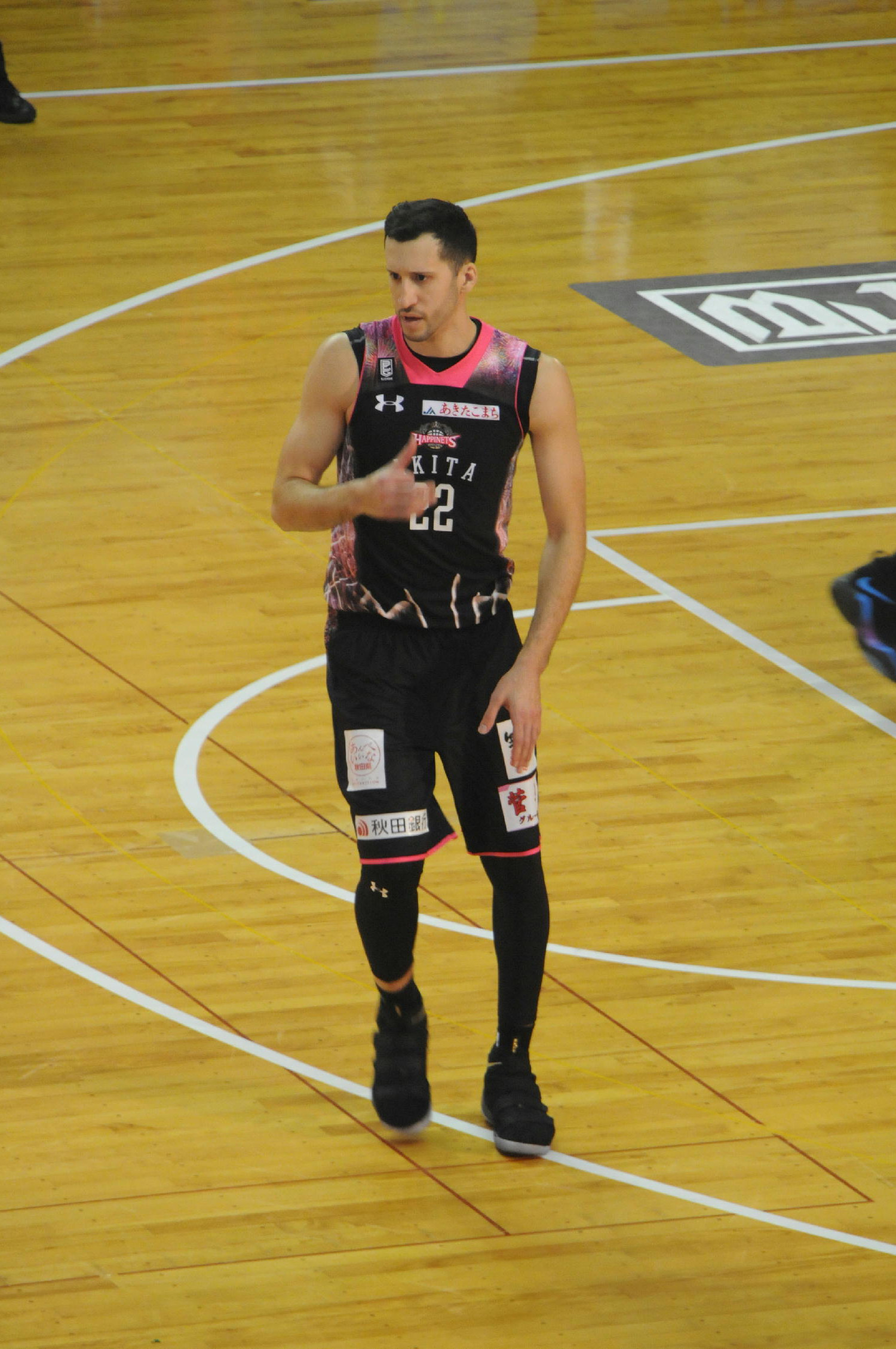

Personal information
- Born: January 1, 1985 (age 41) Albany, New York, U.S.
- Listed height: 6 ft 7 in (2.01 m)
- Listed weight: 216 lb (98 kg)

Career information
- High school: Rice Memorial (South Burlington, Vermont)
- College: Saint Michael’s (2003–2007)
- NBA draft: 2007: undrafted
- Playing career: 2007–2019
- Position: Small forward
- Number: 1

Career history
- 2007–2009: Vermont Frost Heaves
- 2009–2010: Elephants Grevenbroich
- 2010–2011: VfL SparkassenStars Bochum
- 2011–2013: Summerside Storm
- 2013–2014: Island Storm
- 2014: Brampton A's
- 2014: Halifax Rainmen
- 2015–2016: Santos de San Luis
- 2016: Ciclista Olímpico
- 2016–2017: La Union Formosa
- 2017: Brujos de Guayama
- 2017–2018: Akita Northern Happinets
- 2018–2019: Santos de San Luis

Career highlights
- 2× NBL Canada All-Star (2012, 2013); LNBP All-Star (2016); LNBP dunk contest winner (2016); ABA All-Star slam-dunk contest winner (2008); ABA champion (2008)

Christopher Anthony Cayole (born January 1, 1985) is an American former professional basketball player who last played for Santos de San Luis in Mexico. He has consistently been one of the most proficient 3 point marksmen in the NBL Canada and other leagues. Cayole's off court experience included serving as a Basketball Camp Counselor for eight years at the University of Vermont and his alma mater Saint Michael's College.

== College statistics ==
Year	Team	GP	GS	MPG	FG%	3P%	FT%	RPG	APG	SPG	BPG	PPG
2005–06	Saint Michael's	27	8	20.48	.390	.300	.746	4.0	1.3	0.8	1.0	8.7
2006–07	Saint Michael's	29	29	32.14	.485	.392	.776	6.0	2.1	0.9	1.4	13.8

== Career statistics ==
Legend
GP	Games played	GS	Games started	MPG	Minutes per game
FG%	Field goal percentage	3P%	3-point field goal percentage	FT%	Free throw percentage
RPG	Rebounds per game	APG	Assists per game	SPG	Steals per game
BPG	Blocks per game	PPG	Points per game	**Bold**	Career high

=== Regular season ===
Year	Team	GP	GS	MPG	FG%	3P%	FT%	RPG	APG	SPG	BPG	PPG
2011–12	Island Storm	16	12	26.4	.463	.455	.706	3.06	1.38	0.50	0.75	12.00
2012–13	Island Storm	43	10	22.1	.425	.405	.722	2.14	1.05	0.79	0.40	9.56
2014–15	Halifax Rainmen	42	27	25.3	.430	.282	.786	3.00	1.00	1.00	0.26	11.31
2014–15	Brampton A's	1	0	8.2	.500	1.000	.000	1.00	0.00	0.00	0.00	3.00
2015–16	Santos de San Luis	38	38	37.3	.447	.359	.796	5.47	1.55	1.66	0.29	23.79
2015–16	Ciclista Olímpico	25	23	24.0	.398	.352	.719	2.92	0.28	0.36	0.08	9.36
2016–17	La Union Formosa	6	1	14.2	.500	.500	.750	1.17	0.83	0.00	0.00	4.67
2016–17	Brujos de Guayama	2	2	21.9	.375	.000	.750	4.50	0.00	0.00	0.00	7.50
2017–18	Akita Happinets	36	1	17.9	.374	.315	.759	3.4	1.1	1.0	0.2	10.00
2018–19	Santos de San Luis	17	15	31.7	.422	.449	.811	3.12	1.59	0.65	0.18	14.59

=== Playoffs ===
Year	Team	GP	GS	MPG	FG%	3P%	FT%	RPG	APG	SPG	BPG	PPG
2012–13	Island S	9		21.3	.449	.500	.792	1.8	0.6	0.8	0.8	8.4
2014–15	Halifax	9		22.3	.486	.200	.813	2.4	0.6	0.7	0.4	9.7
2014–15	Olimpico	9		24.1	.339	.280	.636	2.4	0.7	0.2	0.1	6.6
2017–18	Akita	5	1	15.17	.424	.250	.385	3.8	0.4	0.4	0.4	7.2

== Personal ==
Cayole got married on September 8, 2017. He tied the knot to Heather Abair. He is a son of Philip and Donna Bibby-Cayole and has two older brothers. Brother, Mike, played junior college basketball at Champlain College.
