= St. Patrick's High School (Halifax, Nova Scotia) =

Saint Patrick's High School
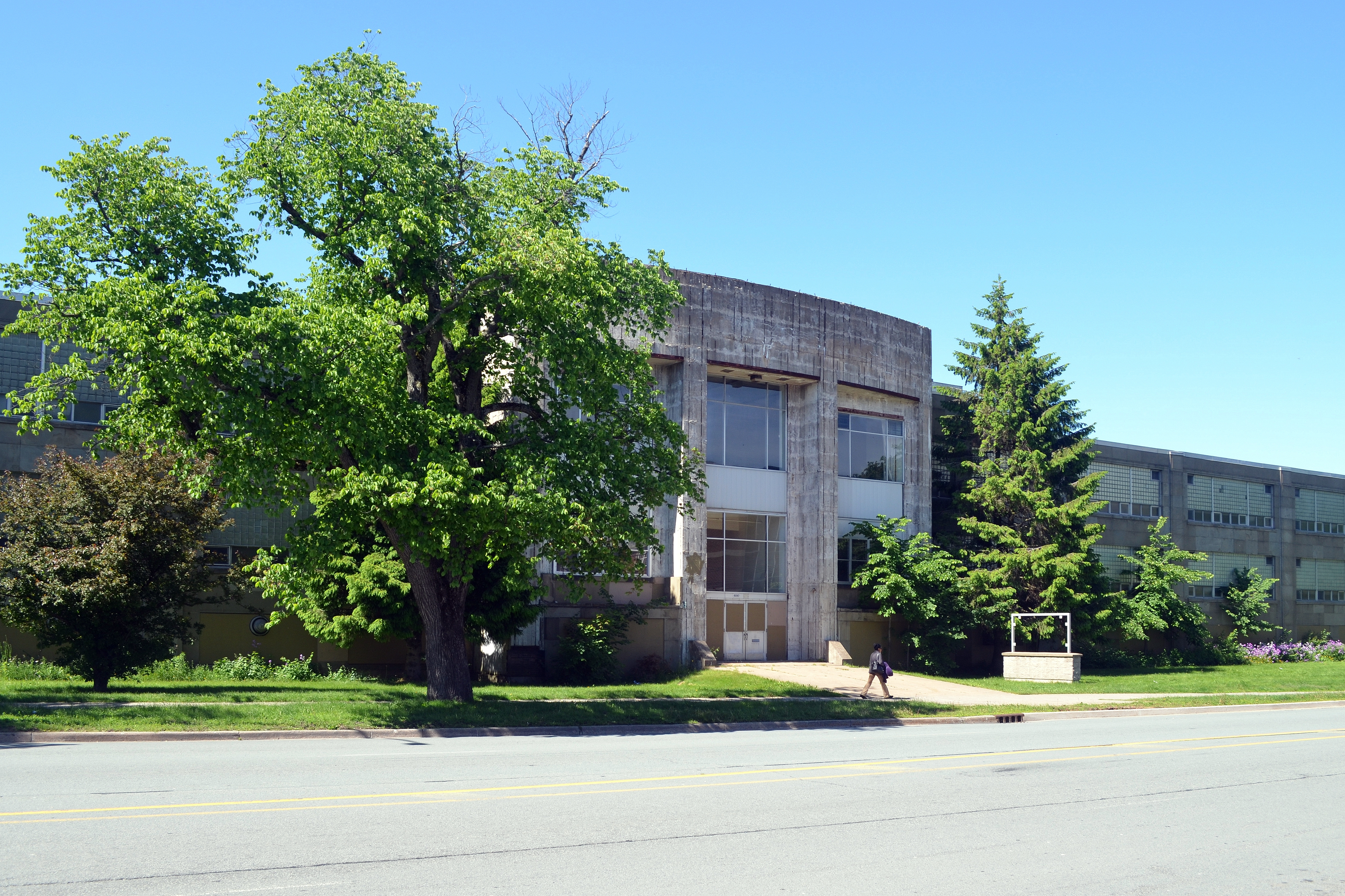
- The abandoned school building in June 2015

Location
- 6067 Quinpool Road; Halifax, Nova Scotia, B3L 1A2; Canada; 44.647926°N 63.591871°W

Information
- Type: Public secondary
- Religious affiliations: Historically Roman Catholic, closed as non-denominational
- Established: September 1954
- Status: Demolished 2015
- Closed: June 2007
- School board: Halifax Regional School Board
- Grades: 10–12
- Language: English, French
- Colors: Green and Gold
- Mascot: Fighting Irish

St. Patrick's High School (St. Pat's) was a non-denominational school centrally located on Quinpool Road in Halifax, Nova Scotia, Canada. Historically a Roman Catholic public school, St. Pat's opened in 1954 less than one block from its rival non-denominational public school, Queen Elizabeth High (QEH). St. Patrick's closed in 2007, merging with QEH to form Citadel High School. The school building was demolished in 2015.

== History ==
=== Origins ===
The Roman Catholics of St. Patrick's Parish petitioned the government in 1846 for aid in educating their children, since most parents could not afford to pay school fees. However, free education did not come to Nova Scotia until the 1865 passage of the Nova Scotia Education Act. Classes for Catholics were subsequently established in the basement of St. Patrick's Church.

Conditions in the basement were poor and a dedicated Saint Patrick's School opened on Lockman Street (now part of Barrington Street) in 1872. It contained ten classrooms supporting about 786 pupils. The high school was opened in the same overcrowded building in 1884, in response to an amendment of the Education Act that provided for high school education. The high school was moved to the Worrall Building, at the corner of Barrington Street and Proctor's Lane, in 1886.

The Saint Patrick's Girls' School opened in 1888 nearby on Brunswick Street to help relieve overcrowding. It was a two-storey brick building with eleven classrooms, and had the highest enrolment in the province, at 1,033 students. The Lockman Street school suffered a serious fire in 1898. The girls' school was dangerously overcrowded, and a new Saint Patrick's Girls' High School opened on Brunswick Street in 1907.

The Saint Patrick's Boys' School on Lockman Street was condemned by the fire marshall in 1916. Land was obtained to build a new school, but construction was delayed by the outbreak of World War I. The Halifax Explosion of December 1917 heavily damaged all three Saint Patrick's Schools. The buildings were subsequently repaired at a cost of $44,641. A new fireproof Boys' School opened in 1921 on Brunswick Street, and the original Saint Patrick's School was turned into a spice factory. Enrolment rose steadily during the early 20th century and various building extensions and annex buildings were used to accommodate the student population.

=== Founding and operating years ===
In 1944, the "Post War Planning Committee" of the school board placed a high priority on building a Roman Catholic high school in the city. The board moved to obtain the property of the old Saint Mary's College at Quinpool Road and Windsor Street, after Saint Mary's moved to Robie Street. The high school students moved to the former Saint Mary's buildings while the new high school building was constructed on the former football field next door. Graduation ceremonies were temporarily held in the auditorium of nearby Queen Elizabeth High School.

The new Saint Patrick's High School opened in September 1954 and a foundation stone was unveiled by Premier Harold Connolly. At the time of opening, it was hailed in the Halifax Mail-Star as a "model high school" and in a national magazine as one of "the most modern and best-equipped schools" in the country, and was the largest school in the country. The boys' and girls' high schools moved from their outdated premises, on Windsor Street and Brunswick Street respectively, into the modern new school. The library collection remained temporarily in the old Saint Mary's College building, and the new library did not open until 1955.

The school building was designed by Downie, Baker and Ahern Architects-Engineers in a modernist style. The school auditorium had a full stage and seating for 1,060. The school was a strict Catholic institution in the early years, with boys and girls segregated and directed by separate principals. On 29 February 1968 the city purchased the former Saint Mary's College building, which was being rented out by the Maritime Conservatory of Music, for expansion of Saint Patrick's. The Saint Mary's building was demolished and Saint Patrick's was expanded to the rear with an addition that opened in 1969.

The 1992 documentary film Speak It! From the Heart of Black Nova Scotia, produced by the National Film Board and directed by Halifax filmmaker Sylvia Hamilton, profiled a group of black students at St. Patrick's as they explored their heritage and tried to build self-esteem. The students in the film discuss racism in the community and confront hateful graffiti in the school washrooms. They form a cultural awareness group and attend a provincial conference to promote leadership in the black community. The film was critically acclaimed and won several awards.

St. Pat's was traditionally known for its football, basketball, and soccer teams, musicals and music programs, and debating club. In 2005–06, St. Pat's celebrated their sole provincial sports victory in Girls' Curling. This was the first provincial Girls' Curling win for St. Pat's since 1976, when Colleen Jones played skip for the team. Also, the Girls Basketball team won the 2005–06, provincial girls championship. The St. Pat's football team won a provincial championship in 2001. first title in 30 years. In January 2007, St. Pat's won the Dalhousie Debating Tournament.

=== Closure ===
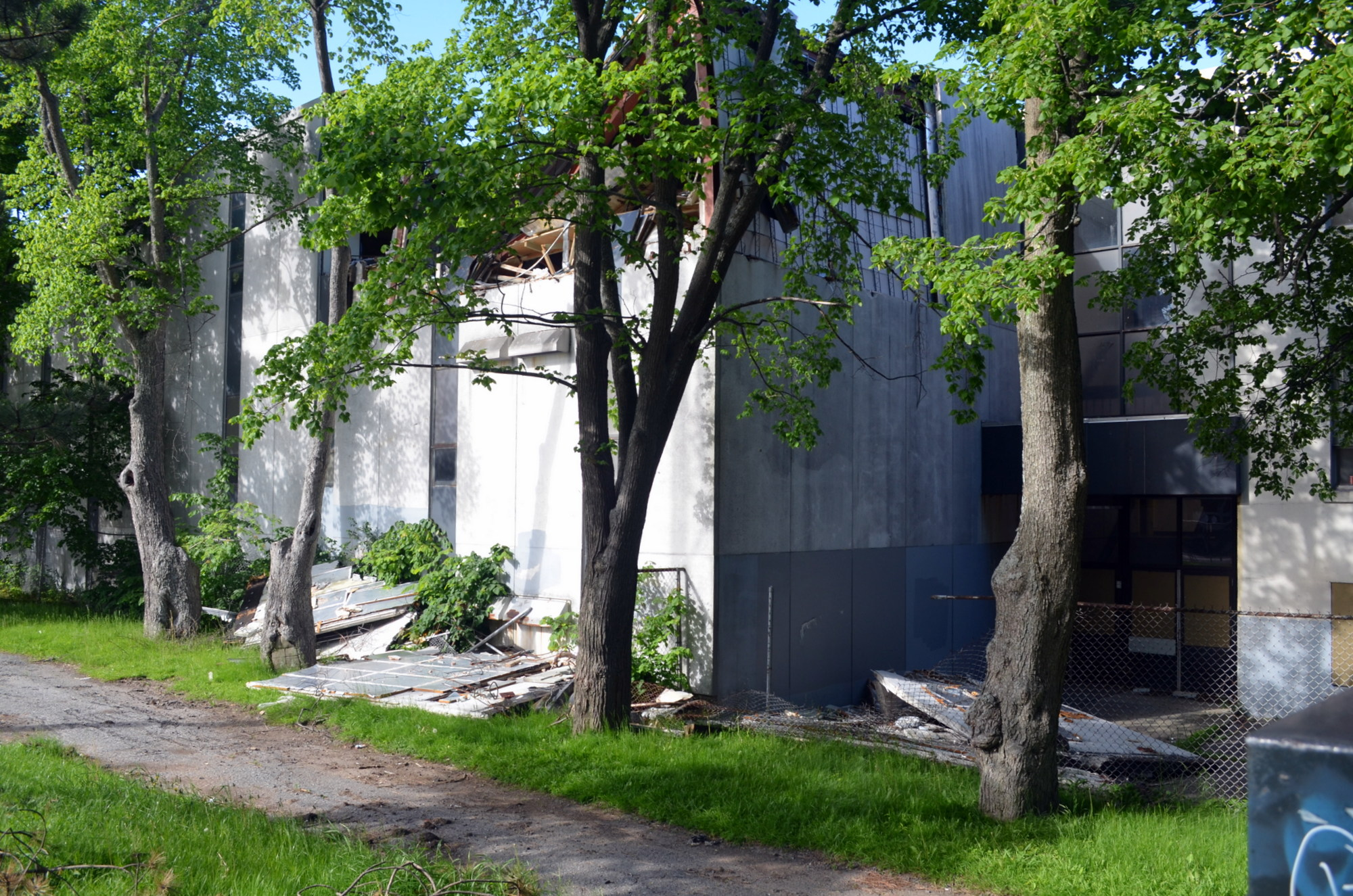
Damage following the 2015 roof collapse.

While the school once had a population of 2,300 students, at which time students enjoying free periods would sometimes be forced onto the street to make room for lessons, it fell dramatically in population to less than 400 housed in an oversized building of 265,000 square feet (24,600 m^{2}). St. Pat's High School was merged with QEH, beginning September 2007, to form Citadel High School, at the former site of the Halifax Nova Scotia Community College campus.

In preparation for the merge of QEH and St. Pat's into Citadel High School, many of the music programs were combined to include members from both schools. These programs include the string orchestra, concert band, and Schola/Jazz chamber choir.

After the high school closed, the St. Patrick's building was renamed Quinpool Education Centre, housing the Halifax All-City Music Centre and other educational and community programs. The underused building cost $400,000 a year to run at this time, and was called a "poster child for wasteful inaction by local government" by the Chronicle Herald in July 2014. The building was vacated in December 2013 and turned over to the city in preparation for demolition.

On early March 27, 2015, a 500 square foot area of the roof of the 1960s section of the school building collapsed under the weight of snow and ice. The precast concrete exterior walls buckled, prompting the city to demolish a section of the walls to prevent another collapse. The tender to demolish the school was scheduled to close on April 7, but was extended so bidders could address any issues caused by the roof collapse.

Demolition of the school began in August 2015. It was complicated by the surprise discovery of asbestos that was not detected through pre-demolition testing.

== Segregation controversy ==
In 2006, St. Pat's Vice Principal Wade Smith, an African-Canadian, stirred up some controversy with his suggestion to establish an Africentric school in Nova Scotia. While the comment was initially an off-the-cuff remark, it was widely debated and generated strong feelings from both sides of the argument. His remark was made under questioning in an interview with CBC News, and reported on by other media outlets. To some, such a move would represent a return to segregation and the Jim Crow laws of the southern United States. Smith has indicated that this would not be the intent, saying that such a school would not exclude other races or ethnicities, but would simply focus on African-Canadian studies. He suggested that a change is needed because the current system is failing black students, many of whom receive low grades and are at increased risk of dropping out of school. He believed that an environment designed to cater to the special needs of African-Canadians would improve these results. Both the Halifax Regional School Board and the Department of Education very quickly dismissed the concept.

== Notable alumni ==
- Art Donahoe, MLA, lawyer, and secretary general of the Commonwealth Parliamentary Association
- Colleen Jones, world championship curler
- Paul Hollingsworth, TSN Reporter and CTV Atlantic anchor/reporter
- Peter McGuigan, local historian
- Jonathan Torrens, actor
- Darrell Young, Stanley Cup Champion, Tampa Bay Lightning, 2004
- Wendell Young, Stanley Cup Champion, Pittsburgh Penguins, 1991 and 1992

== Musicals ==
- 2007 - Urinetown
- 2006 - Godspell
- 2005 - Joseph and the Amazing Technicolor Dreamcoat
- 2004 - Little Shop of Horrors
- 2003 - Les Misérables
- 2002 - Hair
- 2001 - The Pajama Game
- 2000 - Gypsy
- 1999 - Man of La Mancha
- 1998 - Jesus Christ Superstar
- 1997 - Guys and Dolls
- 1996 - How to Succeed in Business Without Really Trying
- 1995 - The Music Man
- 1994 - Sweet Charity
- 1993 - Cabaret
- 1992 - West Side Story
- 1991 - Godspell
- 1990 - Guys and Dolls
- 1989 - Joseph and the Amazing Technicolor Dreamcoat
- 1988 - Jesus Christ Superstar
- 1987 - Grease
- 1986 - Oklahoma!
- 1985 - South Pacific
- 1984 - Oliver!
- 1981 - Friday Nights (an original musical production written by the students of St. Patrick's High School)
- 1962 - Leave it to Jane

== Arms ==
Coat of arms of St. Patrick's High School

Notes
Granted 1 February 1954
Escutcheon
Or semé of trefoils Vert on a saltire Gules four open books proper bound Or overall a torch Sable enflamed Gules and entwined of a serpent Or.
Motto
Usque Ad Optima
