= Kevin Young (basketball, born 1990) =

Puerto Rican professional basketball player

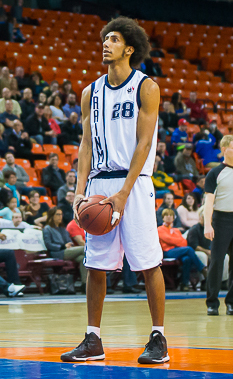
- Young shoots a free throw for the Rainmen

No. 28 – Capitanes de Arecibo
- Position: Forward
- League: BSN

Personal information
- Born: June 24, 1990 (age 36) Riverside, California
- Listed height: 6 ft 8 in (2.03 m)
- Listed weight: 200 lb (91 kg)

Career information
- High school: Perris (Perris, California)
- College: Loyola Marymount (2008–2010); Kansas (2011–2013)
- NBA draft: 2013: undrafted
- Playing career: 2013–present

Career history
- 2013: Halcones de Xalapa
- 2014: Brujos de Guayama
- 2014–2015: Halifax Rainmen
- 2015: Brujos de Guayama
- 2015–2016: Maine Red Claws
- 2016–2017: Indios de Mayagüez
- 2018: Kansas City Tornados
- 2018–2019: Santa Cruz Warriors
- 2019–2020: Stockton Kings
- 2021: Enid Outlaws
- 2021–2023: Mets de Guaynabo
- 2023–2024: Osos de Manatí
- 2024–present: Capitanes de Arecibo

Career highlights
- NBL Canada Defensive Player of the Year (2015); First-team All-NBL Canada (2015)
Medals
Men's basketball
Representing Puerto Rico
Central American and Caribbean Games
Bronze medal – third place	2014 Veracruz	Team competition

Kevin Young Jr. (born June 24, 1990) is a Puerto Rican professional basketball player for the Capitanes de Arecibo of the Baloncesto Superior Nacional (BSN). He played college basketball for Loyola Marymount and Kansas.

== High school career ==
Young attended Perris High School of the Sun Belt League. He helped his team go 25–7 overall and 10–0 in league play and leading his team to the CIF-SS Division 3 finals where it lost to Hemet West Valley. He finished his senior season averaging 16.1 points, 10.8 rebounds and 3.7 blocks.

== College career ==
Young began his college basketball career with Loyola Marymount where he broke the LMU school freshman rebounds (224) and rebounds per game (7.2 rpg) records with 224 boards for 7.2 rpg and also set the LMU freshman records with 34 blocked shots and 51 steals.

In 2011, Young transferred to Kansas. As a junior, he played in 38 of 39 games, becoming the Jayhawks' key sixth man as the season progressed. He averaged 11.4 minutes, 3.4 points, 3.0 rebounds and 0.6 assists per game. As a senior, he ranked among the Big 12 leaders in rebounding (seventh, 6.8) and steals (15th, 1.1) and was Kansas' second-leading rebounder at 6.8 rpg. Young had 22 games with seven or more rebounds, including each of his final four games of the season.

== Professional career ==
After going undrafted in the 2013 NBA draft, Young signed with Mexican club Halcones de Xalapa on October 29, 2013. He later had a stint in Puerto Rico playing for Brujos de Guayama before signing with the Halifax Rainmen in December 2014. Young was named NBL Canada Defensive Player of the Year for the 2014–15 season. On May 1, 2015, he and 10 Rainmen teammates were fined $5,000 each and suspended from the NBL for an indefinite amount of time. The team did not appear in the decisive contest of the league finals after violence broke out in the shootaround prior to the game. He subsequently returned to Brujos de Guayama.

On October 31, 2015, Young was selected by the Bakersfield Jam with the 17th overall pick in the 2015 NBA Development League Draft, only to be traded to the Maine Red Claws in a three-team draft night deal. On January 17, 2016, he was waived by the Red Claws.

He joined the Stockton Kings in 2019. In his debut, Young posted 17 points and grabbed 12 rebounds in a victory over the Canton Charge. In 2021, Young signed with the Enid Outlaws of The Basketball League.

In June 2021, Young signed with Mets de Guaynabo of the Baloncesto Superior Nacional.

== International career ==
He also represents Puerto Rico at the international level, having played for his home country in the 2009 FIBA Under-19 World Championship and placing sixth overall.

== Personal life ==
He is the son of Alicia Morales and Kevin Young Sr and has a brother and a sister. His father played basketball at Mt. San Jancinto College. Young graduated from Kansas with a degree in African American Studies and a minor in history.
