= Bill Jones (basketball, born 1966) =

American basketball player and coach

Windsor Express
- Title: Head coach
- League: Basketball Super League

Personal information
- Born: March 18, 1966 (age 60) Detroit, Michigan, U.S.
- Listed height: 6 ft 7 in (2.01 m)
- Listed weight: 175 lb (79 kg)

Career information
- High school: Southwestern (Detroit, Michigan)
- College: Iowa (1984–1988)
- NBA draft: 1988: undrafted
- Playing career: 1988–2001
- Position: Small forward
- Number: 20
- Coaching career: 2004–present

Career history

Playing
- 1988–1989: Quad City Thunder
- 1989: New Jersey Nets
- 1989–1990: Quad City Thunder
- 1990–1992: Montpellier Paillade
- 1992–1993: BCM Gravelines
- 1993–1994: Paris Racing
- 1994–1995: Quad City Thunder
- 1995–1998: Andrea Costa Imola
- 1998–1999: Serapide Pozzuoli
- 1999: Napoli
- 1999–2000: Basket Rimini Crabs
- 2000–2001: Gaiteros del Zulia

Coaching
- 2004–2005: Detroit Wheels
- 2007–2009: Detroit Panthers
- 2011–present: Windsor Express

Career highlights
- 2× NBLC Champion (2014, 2015); 2× French League Best Scorer (1991, 1992); CBA All-Star (1995); All-CBA Second Team (1990); CBA All-Rookie First Team (1989)
- Stats at NBA.com
- Stats at Basketball Reference

Clarence William Jones (born March 18, 1966) is an American former professional basketball player. His professional career spanned from 1989 to 2001, and included stops in the National Basketball Association, Continental Basketball Association, France, Italy, and Venezuela.

== College career ==
Jones played college basketball at the University of Iowa, from 1984–85 to 1987–88. He scored 981 career points, and helped lead the Hawkeyes to four consecutive berths into the NCAA Tournament. He appeared in 125 games, and averaged 7.8 points and 3.3 rebounds per game.

== Professional career ==
Although he was not selected in the NBA draft, Jones would play a total of 37 games in the 1988–89 NBA season, with the New Jersey Nets, where he averaged 3.5 points and 1.3 rebounds per game.

Other professional highlights included being named to the CBA All-Rookie First Team in 1988–89, the All-CBA Second Team in 1989–90, and the CBA All-Star Game, in 1995.

Jones retired from professional basketball after the 2000–01 season. As of March 2012 he owns a bank security company in his home state of Michigan.

Since the inception of the team, Jones has served as head coach of the Windsor Express in the NBL of Canada.

== Career statistics ==
Legend
GP	Games played	GS	Games started	MPG	Minutes per game
FG%	Field goal percentage	3P%	3-point field goal percentage	FT%	Free throw percentage
RPG	Rebounds per game	APG	Assists per game	SPG	Steals per game
BPG	Blocks per game	PPG	Points per game	**Bold**	Career high

=== NBA ===
==== Regular season ====
Year	Team	GP	GS	MPG	FG%	3P%	FT%	RPG	APG	SPG	BPG	PPG
1988–89	New Jersey	37	0	8.3	.490	.000	.674	1.3	.5	.5	.2	3.5
