= Andre Levingston =

American entrepreneur and basketball coach

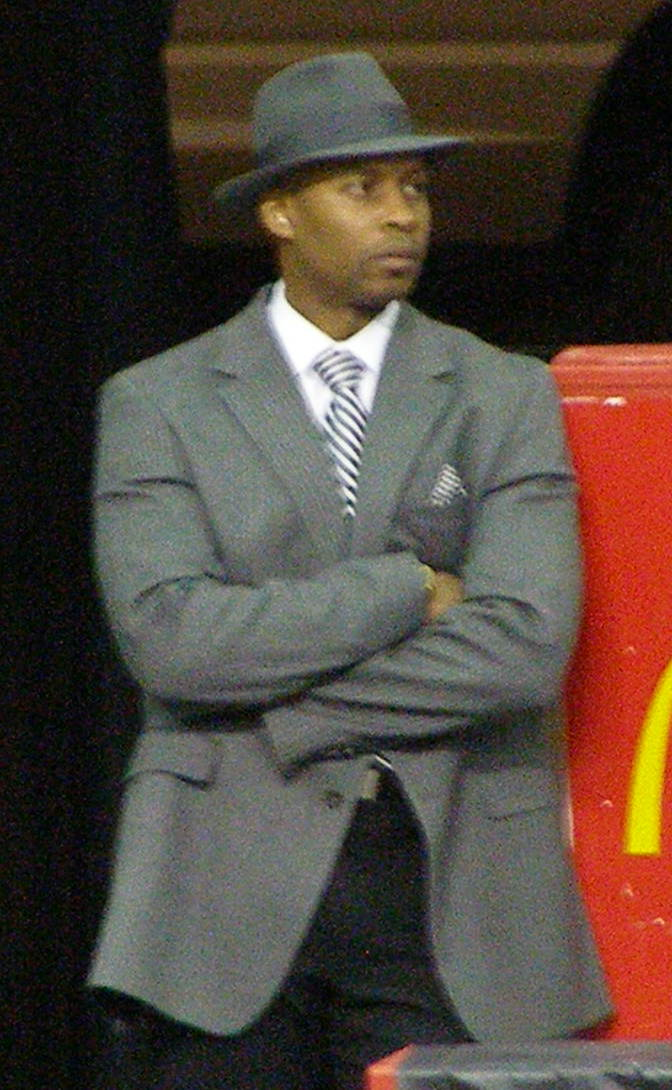
- Levingston watches a Rainmen game in 2008
- Born: Detroit, Michigan, U.S.
- Education: California State University, Chico
- Occupations: Businessman, entrepreneur

Andre Levingston is an American entrepreneur and basketball coach. He was formerly an auto detailer and schoolteacher. He is a co-founder of the National Basketball League of Canada (NBL) and most recently served as the owner and president of the Halifax Rainmen. Levingston has experience as the president of the Premier Basketball League (PBL).

== Early life ==
Levingston was brought up in Detroit, Michigan in the 1970s. He attended California State University, Chico, where he played college basketball at the NCAA Division III level. He graduated from school with a degree in child psychology. This led him to becoming a schoolteacher. Among his first jobs was teaching fourth grade at the Paul Robeson Academy, a predominantly male African American school in his hometown of Detroit. He said, "We were losing too many black boys to the streets, to violence, to jail. There were a lot of single parents, women ran homes, and when (kids) came to school it was all women. We wanted them to see positive men. It was an amazing school, one of the best things I've ever been a part of."

Levingston later became an entrepreneur and moved to Toronto, Ontario, where he owned a restaurant and a car custom shop with Toronto Raptors player Morris Peterson. At this time, Levingston was requested to create a professional basketball team in Mississauga, but he decided that he would start one in Halifax, Nova Scotia, a city that he and his business partners felt had more potential. He became convinced after meeting Halifax mayor Peter J. Kelly.

== Career ==
Levingston then served as the owner and president of the Rainmen in the 2007–08 season, when the team played in the American Basketball Association (ABA). He continued to hold the position as his team moved to the Premier Basketball League (PBL).

== Personal ==
Levingston has two sons, Stephon and Tyrone. In sixth grade, Stephon was adopted by Levingston. Tyrone attempted to establish a professional basketball franchise based in Sydney, Nova Scotia in the National Basketball League of Canada (NBL) in the fall of 2015. However, he failed to properly finance the Cape Breton team and they would not compete in the 2015–16 season. He has since funded the team and they have played in Cape Breton, 2018–2019 is their third season.

Preceded by John Kennedy	Commissioner of the NBL Canada; 2012–2013	Succeeded by Paul Riley
