= Halifax Rainmen =

Former basketball team in Halifax, Canada

- Founded: 2006
- Folded: 2015
- League: NBL Canada
- Division: Atlantic
- Team history: Halifax Rainmen (ABA); 2007–2008; Halifax Rainmen (PBL); 2008–2011; Halifax Rainmen (NBLC); 2011–2015
- Based in: Halifax, Nova Scotia
- Arena: Scotiabank Centre (formerly the Halifax Metro Centre)
- Colours: Navy blue, Sky blue, White
- Owner: Andre Levingston
- Championships: 0

The Halifax Rainmen were a professional basketball team based in Halifax, Nova Scotia, Canada. They played in the Atlantic Division of the National Basketball League of Canada (NBL), and their home games took place at the Scotiabank Centre (formerly known as the Halifax Metro Centre). Andre Levingston helped establish the Rainmen in 2006 and became the team's sole owner. The team played their first season in the American Basketball Association (ABA). However, after becoming unhappy with the ABA, they moved to the Premier Basketball League (PBL) for the next three seasons. In 2011, they joined the NBL Canada as one of the original seven teams. Despite the Rainmen's success in the four seasons they spent in the Canadian league, including two Finals appearances, the Rainmen filed for bankruptcy in July 2015. The team was coming off a controversial loss in the 2015 NBL Canada Finals against the Windsor Express and forfeited Game 7 after taking part in a pre-game brawl. The Halifax Hurricanes, with a larger ownership group than the Rainmen's single owner, replaced the Rainmen in NBL Canada for the 2015–16 season.

== History ==
Alternate Rainmen logo (2007–2008), the Red, White and Blue ABA ball was used in the logo, until it was replaced prior to the 2008–09 season.

The American Basketball Association announced on August 23, 2006 that Halifax, Nova Scotia, had been granted an expansion franchise for the 2007–08 season. A local contest was later held among fans to help name the team, and on December 19, 2006, the organization unveiled that they would be known as the Halifax Rainmen.

The Rainmen hosted the 2007 ABA All-Star Game ten months before the team started play. Joe Newman, the league's chairman, believed it would be an excellent way to promote Canadian expansion.

On May 30, 2007, the team announced their home venue, the Halifax Metro Centre, and head coach, Kevin MaBone. Mabone later stepped down due to a family illness and was replaced as head coach by Rick Lewis. Shannon Hansen and Daniel Freiberg joined Lewis on the coaching staff as assistants.

The Rainmen's first two player signings were Peter Benoite and Chad Eichelberger. Benoite was a former CIS standout for the Memorial Sea-Hawks and is currently their head coach.

Days before their first game, the Rainmen announced the signing of star Canadian guard Jermaine Anderson, a veteran member of the Canadian National basketball team.

=== 2007–08 season ===
The Rainmen played their inaugural season in the Northeast Division of the Blue Conference in the American Basketball Association. The team won its first-ever game on November 15, 2007 at the Metro Center, against the Boston Blizzard by a score of 136-103, in front of 4,343 fans. Halifax went on to lose seven straight before their next win, against the Montreal Royal. The Rainmen ended the season with a record of 12 wins and 20 losses.

Logo used by the Rainmen (2007–08) during their time in the ABA.

Eric Crookshank led the Rainmen during the season, averaging 20.5 points and 12.3 rebounds per game. He was also named to the All-ABA first team. Crookshank and Brian Silverhorn were both chosen to represent the Rainmen at the 2008 ABA All-Star Weekend, in Vermont. Halifax lead the American Basketball Association in attendance during the year.

On March 19, 2008, the Rainmen withdrew from the ABA due to the ownership's dissatisfaction with the league's management. The team announced their intention to pursue membership in the NBA Development League. D-League president, Dan Reed, visited Halifax and the Metro Centre. While he stated was impressed with the city, owner, and arena, he said that for travel costs and other reasons, 2008–09 expansion would be unlikely, and a more likely expansion target would be the 2009–10 season. On June 23, the Rainmen joined the Premier Basketball League.

=== 2009 season ===
Logo used by the Rainmen during their tenure in the PBL.

The Rainmen kicked off their inaugural PBL season by placing former Rainmen Eric Crookshank, Kadiri Richard, Brian Silverhorn and Jimmy Twyman on their protected players list, giving them exclusive PBL negotiating rights to the four. Halifax then received the second overall pick in the PBL Entry Draft, held in Chicago, Illinois. With the pick the Rainmen selected former Acadia Axemen all-star Walter Moyse. With their second-round pick, Halifax selected David Bailey, formerly of the Maryland Nighthawks. Ultimately, Moyse could not come to terms with the team.

In early November 2008, the Rainmen signed Bailey for the 2009 season, along with former ABA All-Stars Rob Sanders, a former Manchester Millrat, and Cordell Jeanty, formerly of the Montreal Royal. Jimmy Twyman and Brian Silverhorn returned to the team along with newcomers Kevin Hammack and Tyronne McNeal. Forward Kadiri Richard was granted a release and was signed by PBL rival the Wilmington Sea Dawgs.

On November 17, the Rainmen re-signed All-Star Eric Crookshank, who had turned down offers from the Vermont Frost Heaves and various overseas teams to sign with the Rainmen. Later that month, the Rainmen signed Jason McGriff, Rodney Mayes and Canadian Jabulah Murray. McGriff and Murray failed to report to the team. With training camp underway, the Rainmen signed shooting guard Glen Dandridge, a former three-year member of the University of Missouri basketball program, to fill the void left by their departures.

Halifax won in their Premier Basketball League opener 110-108 versus the hosting Quebec Kebs on January 2, 2009. Earlier in the day, the Rainmen signed guard Zach Ramey, formerly of the Rockford Fury. The Rainmen played their home-opener seven days later against the Kebs, winning in front of over 4,000 fans.

On January 14, the team suspended star Eric Crookshank for the season, with pay, following a series of conflicts with Coach Rick Lewis. The Rainmen did not comment on the cause.

On February 3, the team released Rick Lewis, the head coach and general manager, citing poor results in weekend games at Vermont and Manchester. The team's record was 6-5 at that point, dropping the Rainmen a game behind in a tight divisional race with Vermont and Manchester. Rodney Mayes, one of the last of the players signed in late November, was also released. Assistant Shannon Hanson served briefly as interim head coach. Following Lewis' dismissal, Crookshank was reinstated.

On February 5, the Rainmen announced Halifax native Les Berry as the new head coach. Berry previously led Acadia University within one win of the national CIS Men's Basketball championship. The team was then bolstered by the signings of guard Tony Bennett who played his college ball at Bradley University and PBL leading scorer A.J. Millien. Although Berry led the team to a record of 6 wins and 3 losses, the Rainmen failed to qualify for the PBL playoffs.

Following the season, Millien was named "PBL Newcomer of the Year" while Tony Bennett was named to the PBL All-Defensive team.

=== 2010 season ===
The Rainmen's first move of the 2010 season was to re-sign coach Les Berry. Berry and team owner Andre Levingston began recruiting during the offseason and signed a number of players, including former NBA'er Desmond Ferguson. Tony Bennett, Eric Crookshank, and John Strickland were all re-signed for the 2010 season.

=== 2011 season ===
During the pre-season, the Rainmen added Kavon Jones, Josh Dollard, Tajuan Porter, Mike Mercer, Marshall Brown and Tommy Mitchell while welcoming back veteran players Eric Crookshank and Desmond Ferguson to the roster. The Rainmen also re-signed 6'1 point guard Taliek Brown, who joined the team during the 2010 season but did not play due to a family emergency.

On January 14, the organization added former NBA Development League Forward/Centre James "Boo" Jackson to their lineup.

On January 22, the Rainmen announced the addition of Kirk Snyder to their roster but after playing three games between January 23–30, they waived him.

On January 24, Les Berry's tenure as Head Coach of the Halifax Rainmen ended by mutual consent. While the Rainmen had been pleased with Berry's performance, the decision for his resignation came after he was presented with an opportunity to build his career outside of the sports arena. Two days later, former NBA player, scout and coach Mike Evans was named as head coach of the Rainmen for the remainder of the 2011 season.

The Rainmen ended their 2011 season as the fourth place team in the PBL after falling to the Lawton Fort Sill Cavalry in the final game of their series (1-2). In the first game of the series, the Cavalry beat the Rainmen in Halifax by one point in overtime. Four days later, the Rainmen beat the Cavalry by ten points in Oklahoma, where the Cavalry had not lost in three years.

After the controversy surrounding the Rochester Razorsharks's advancement through the PBL playoffs, the Rainmen joined the Saint John Mill Rats in disassociating themselves from the PBL within one hour after the playoffs ended. The decision to withdraw from the league was made upon the Rochester RazorSharks being crowned as PBL champions over the Lawton Fort-Sill Cavalry, with controversies over the officiating of games, as the RazorSharks and the league share a common owner. Rainmen owner Andre Levingston was quoted as saying, "I am appalled by the officiating that took place during the playoffs, and am ashamed of the PBL's operations this season. I want nothing but the best for our city, our fans, our sponsors, and our players, and I can say with confidence that the best is no longer found in the PBL." The Quebec Kebs followed suit one day later.

On May 12, 2011, the Rainmen, Mill Rats, and Kebs founded the National Basketball League of Canada.

=== 2011–12 season ===
The Rainmen were one of seven teams competing in NBL Canada's inaugural season, joining past PBL rivals the Quebec Kebs and Saint John Mill Rats along with new teams the London Lightning, Moncton Miracles Oshawa Power, and Summerside Storm. The head coach was Pep Claros.

Before the season, the Rainmen signed Halifax native, 6'0 guard, Christian Upshaw. Upshaw was the third-highest scorer in the Atlantic University Sport the previous year, averaging 18.9 points a game for St. Francis Xavier University (St. FX). In 2009–2010, Upshaw was named MVP of the AUS and was a CIS All-Canadian.

Due to a violation of league and club policies, the Rainmen suspended centre DeAndre Thomas indefinitely and forward Eric Crookshank for one game.

The Rainmen signed 6'1 Canadian guard Joey Haywood. Haywood attended Saint Mary's University in Halifax, Nova Scotia and went on to become the leading scorer for three straight years in the CIS. The previous season he averaged 28.9 points a game and earned the title of MVP in the AUS.

The Halifax Rainmen added former NBA players Orien Greene and Richard Delk to their roster. The Rainmen also made their first trade of the season, trading former NBA player Rodney Buford to the London Lightning in exchange for 6'6" forward Tyrone Levett.

The Rainmen signed 6'9 centre Stevy Worah-Ozimo, but waived him days after. They also activated 6'9 centre and former NBA player Eddie Robinson.

The Halifax Rainmen added 5'9 guard Chris Hagan to the roster and released Richard Delk. Hagan played NCAA Div-1 basketball at Midwestern State University and professionally in New Zealand.

The Halifax Rainmen released their 2011 draft pick, 6'4 Canadian Papa Oppong, and the ex-NBA player Orien Greene.

The Rainmen signed 6'9 Canadian Troy Gottselig and placed Abdullahi Kuso on injury reserved. Gottselig was later released after the signing of forward Richard Anderson. The Rainmen continued to make moves as they released ex-NBA player Eddie Robinson and activated Abduhalli Kuso from the injured reserve list.

The Halifax Rainmen signed Darnell Hugee as well as waiving guard Darrin Dorsey.

Taliek Brown, Canadian Joey Haywood and Tyrone Levett were all selected to participate in the 2012 NBL All-star game.

Lawrence Wright led the Rainmen in scoring with 15.41 ppg. Taliek Brown proved to be a true point with his team-leading 3.05 apg and fan favorite Eric Crookshank grabbed 6.88 rpg.

By the end of the regular season, the Rainmen finishedsecond in the NBL Canada standings and were in good position to make a run at the title. They defeated the Quebec Kebs in the first round of the playoffs. They then went on to face the London Lightning in the finals. Coming back from a 2-0 start which included a huge comeback in the last seconds of game 3, the Rainmen tied the series 2-2. They lost the series 3-2.

After the season, Chris Hagan, Lawrence Wright and Abduhalli Kuso all chose to sign to other teams.

On August 27, the second annual NBL Canada draft took place. The Rainmen did not have a first-round pick due to an early trade in the season but held the seventh pick in the second round. The Rainmen drafted 6'2 guard Courtland Bluford. After the draft, the Rainmen announced they traded Tyrone Levett and Christian "T-Bear" Upshaw to the Moncton Miracles for their first-round draft pick Anthony Johnson. The Rainmen also landed guard Brandon Robinson from the Oshawa Power for cash and a 2013 third-round pick. Robinson was the Rookie of the Year in 2011–2012 and averaged a league best 19.86 ppg. After the draft, owner Andre Levingston commented on the draft trades. "Robinson led our league in scoring last year and is probably the best two guard in our league. He's a very explosive guy. He can score in different facets of the game. He's definitely going to add an element to our game that we lacked last year, which was a guy that can get his shot any time he wants it."

It was announced by the Rainmen that they had re-signed All-Star Canadian guard Joey Haywood. The Rainmen also released fan favorite Eric Crookshank and traded Taliek Brown to Quebec Kebs for a future first round pick.

The Rainmen announced the trading of their 2012 first-round draft pick Anthony Johnson to the Laval Kebs in return for All-Star guard Eddie Smith. They have also signed point guard Darren Duncan, forward Hillary Haley, guard Joel Smith and Halifax native and St. Francis Xavier University ("St. FX") alumnus Tyler Richards. Each player had attended Halifax's pre-season camp.

=== 2012–13 season ===
The Rainmen began their pre-season on Sunday, October 21 versus the Summerside Storm at the Halifax Metro Centre. On November 13, 2012, the Rainmen ended the contract with head coach Cliff Levingston after a poor start to the season. Colter Simmonds filled in as interim head coach until the next head coach will be announced.

On November 15, 2012, the Rainmen named former Laval Kebs head coach Rob Spon to the same position.

=== 2014–15 season ===
The Rainmen had the second-best record in the league and were the Atlantic Division champion. They advanced to the championship round vs the Windsor Express, which was supposed to come down to a decisive Game 7 hosted by Windsor. Unfortunately, before Game 7 could even begin, the two teams brawled, police were summoned and the Rainmen left the Windsor Arena. Despite calls to the owner and team to come back by league officials, Halifax forfeited the game and the championship to the Express. Coach Pep Claros was nominated coach of the year, but also suspended by the league for life following an investigation of the brawl.

== Bankruptcy, folding, and replacement NBL Canada team ==
Following the 2015 NBL Canada Finals brawl with the Windsor Express, the Rainmen were fined a total of $90,000. While each player that participated in the altercation was forced to pay $5,000 each and serve an indefinite suspension along with the coaching staff, a $20,000 fine was also imposed on the organization itself due to "conduct detrimental to the league." Over two months later, the team filed for bankruptcy and was nearly $700,000 in debt, ultimately folding. Owner Andre Levingston said, "While it's disappointing to see this chapter end, I can hold my head high knowing that we did everything we could have done. I love this game and I love this city." The market, however, would not be left without a team as the Halifax Hurricanes, with a larger ownership group of local businessmen including Levingston (who joined the Hurricanes as its general manager), replaced the Rainmen in the market beginning with the 2015–16 NBL Canada season.

== Home arena ==
The Scotiabank Centre multi-purpose indoor sporting arena located, in Halifax, Nova Scotia, Canada. The arena has a capacity of 11,093. The Rainmen share the arena with the Halifax Mooseheads of the Quebec Major Junior Hockey League.

The building is next to the Former World Trade and Convention Centre, at the foot of Citadel Hill and it is the largest arena in Halifax.

== Season-by-season record ==
Halifax Rainmen season-by-season record
Season	League	Games Played	Wins	Losses	Winning Percentage	Play-offs
2007–08	ABA	32	12	20	.375	Withdrew from ABA before play-offs
2009	PBL	20	12	8	.600	Did not qualify
2010	PBL	20	13	7	.650	Lost in semi-finals to Lawton–Fort Sill
2011	PBL	20	10	10	.500	Lost in semi-finals to Lawton–Fort Sill
2011–12	NBLC	36	23	13	.639	Lost in finals to London Lightning
2012–13	NBLC	40	19	21	.475	Did not qualify
2013–14	NBLC	40	11	29	.275	Lost in the Semi-finals to Island Storm
2014–15	NBLC	32	20	12	.625	Lost in the Finals to Windsor Express See also: 2015 NBL Canada Finals brawl
Totals	ABA	32	12	20	.375
Totals	PBL	60	35	25	.583
Totals	NBLC	148	73	75	.493

== See also ==
- Sports teams in Halifax, Nova Scotia
