= 2014–15 Mississauga Power season =

Canadian basketball season

Mississauga Power
2014–15 season
- Owner: Henry Chow
- Head coach: Kyle Julius
- Arena: Hershey Centre
- Central Division: 4th (7–25 record [.219])
- Playoffs: Lost to Express 1–3 (first round)

The 2014–15 Mississauga Power season was the fourth and final season of the franchise in the National Basketball League of Canada (NBL). It was also their second season in Mississauga. Following an unsuccessful season with a record of 7–25, the Power folded, resulting in the creation of Raptors 905, a new NBA Development League affiliate to the NBA's Toronto Raptors.

== Roster ==
Note: Flags indicate national team eligibility at FIBA-sanctioned events. Players may hold other non-FIBA nationalities not displayed.

Mississauga Power roster
Players
Coaches

Pos.	No.	Nat.	Name	Ht.	Wt.	Age
SG	0	(Canada)	Ward, Warren (injured)	6 ft 6 in (1.98 m)	210 lb (95 kg)	35 – 16 November 1989
G	1	(Canada)	Vernon, Tyrell	6 ft 1 in (1.85 m)	200 lb (91 kg)	36 – 8 September 1988
G/F	2	(United States)	Oliver, Brian (S)	6 ft 7 in (2.01 m)	225 lb (102 kg)	34 – 5 September 1990
G	3	(Canada)	Newby, Jabs	6 ft 2 in (1.88 m)	195 lb (88 kg)	33 – 15 August 1991
PG	4	(Canada)	Ruach, Tut	6 ft 1 in (1.85 m)	175 lb (79 kg)	39 – 30 April 1985
PG	5	(United States)	Strong, Omar	5 ft 9 in (1.75 m)	162 lb (73 kg)	34 – 16 May 1990
PG	9	(United States)	Garland, Tyrone	6 ft 1 in (1.85 m)	185 lb (84 kg)
G	10	(United States)	Capers, Marcus	6 ft 4 in (1.93 m)	190 lb (86 kg)	35 – 21 December 1989
C	20	(United States)	Thomas, Doug (injured)	6 ft 9 in (2.06 m)	245 lb (111 kg)	41 – 20 September 1983
G	22	(United States)	Weidner, Jordan	6 ft 1 in (1.85 m)	187 lb (85 kg)
F	32	(United States)	Cooper, Paul	6 ft 9 in (2.06 m)	250 lb (110 kg)	35 – 1 February 1990
G	34	(United States)	Grant, Malcolm	6 ft 1 in (1.85 m)	190 lb (86 kg)	36 – 21 June 1988
C	44	(Canada)	Allison, Mike	6 ft 10 in (2.08 m)	220 lb (100 kg)	34 – 4 August 1990

Head coach

- (Canada) Kyle Julius

Assistant coach(es)

- (Canada) Jeremie Kayeye
- (Canada) Kin Chan

Legend

- (C) Team captain
- Injured

- Roster
Updated: May 23, 2015

== Transactions ==
=== Trades ===
August 25, 2014	To Mississauga Power Rights to George Goode (from Windsor); Rights to Robert Dewar	To Windsor Express Rights to Ryan Anderson from Mississauga); Rights to Anthony Petteway

October 29, 2014	To Mississauga Power Cash considerations	To Halifax Rainmen Rights to Justin Tubbs

December 11, 2014	To Mississauga Power 2015 first-round draft pick	To Windsor Express Rights to George Goode; Kirk Williams

December 29, 2014	To Mississauga Power Jabs Newby	To Saint John Mill Rats Alex Johnson

=== Free agents ===
==== Additions ====
Player	Signed	Former team
Donald Johnson	November 12, 2014	Brampton A's
Antoine Hood	December 8, 2014	Idaho Stampede

==== Subtractions ====
Player	Reason left	New team
Julius Brooks	Released	Rakvere Tarvas
Antoine Hood	Released	
Chad Posthumus	Buyout	Argentino de Junín
