= Alex Johnson (basketball) =

Canadian basketball player (born 1988)

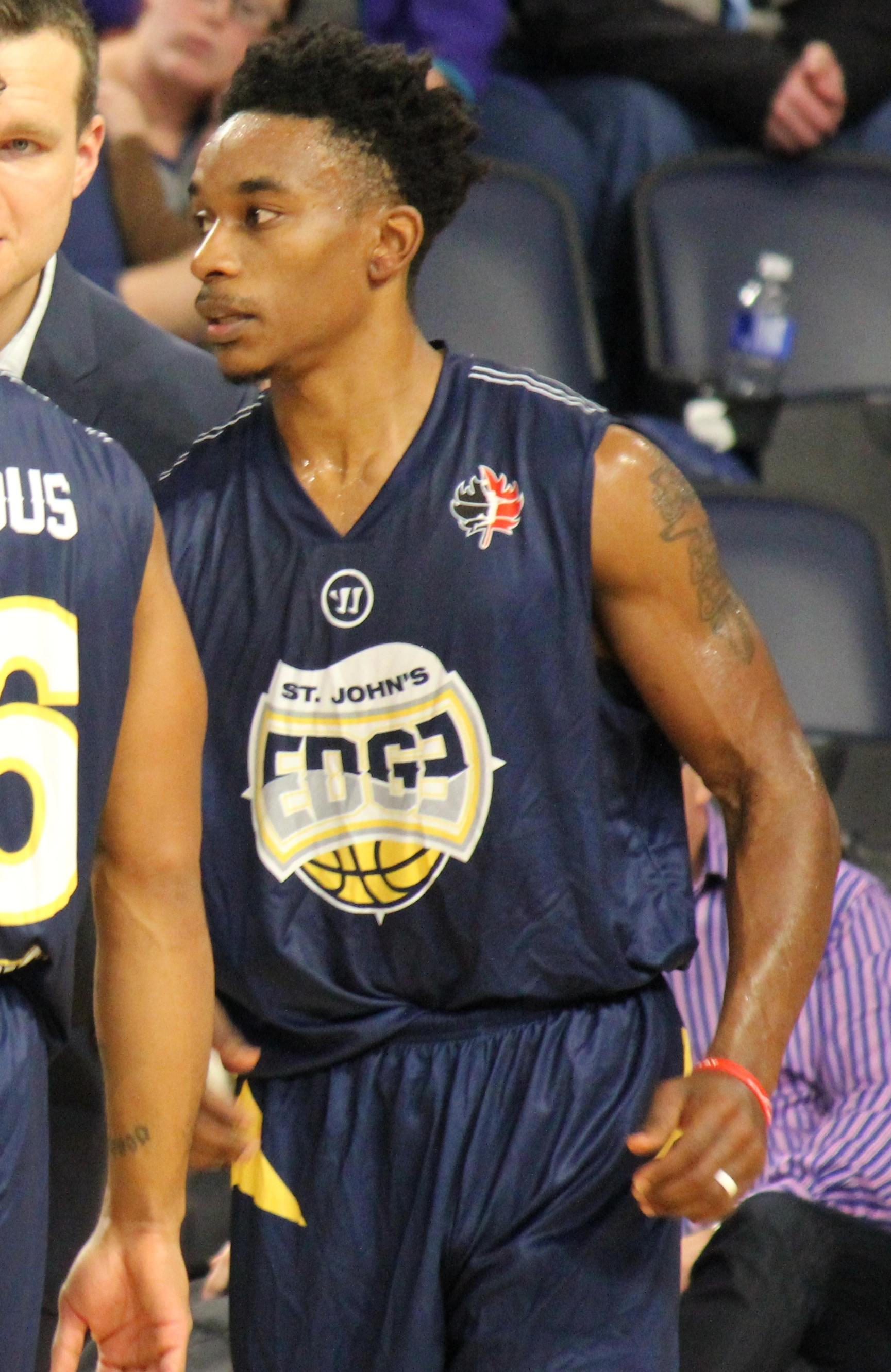
- Johnson with the St. John's Edge in 2017

No. 3 – Toronto
- Position: Guard
- League: FIBA 3x3

Personal information
- Born: January 18, 1988 (age 38) Toronto, Ontario, Canada
- Listed height: 5 ft 10 in (1.78 m)
- Listed weight: 175 lb (79 kg)

Career information
- High school: Vaughan Road Academy (Toronto, Ontario)
- College: Cal State Bakersfield (2007–2011); NC State (2011–2012)
- NBA draft: 2012: undrafted
- Playing career: 2012–present

Career history
- 2012–2013: Timba Timișoara
- 2013–2014: Mississauga Power
- 2014: Hamilton Huskies
- 2014–2015: Saint John Mill Rats
- 2015–2016: Halifax Hurricanes
- 2016: Windsor Express
- 2016–2017: Grand Rapids Drive
- 2017: Orangeville A's
- 2017–2018: St. John's Edge
- 2018: Leones de Riobamba
- 2018: Montreal (3x3)
- 2018–2019: London Lightning
- 2019: CEB Puerto Montt
- 2019: Windsor Express
- 2019–2021: Hamilton Honey Badgers
- 2021: Edmonton (3x3)
- 2022: Chicago (3x3)
- 2025: Scarborough (3x3)
- 2018–present: Toronto (3x3)

Career highlights
- 2× NBL Canada All-Canada Team (2014, 2015); NBL Canada All-Star (2014)
Medals
Men's 3x3 basketball
Representing Canada
FIBA 3x3 AmeriCup
| Bronze medal – third place | 2024 San Juan | Team |

Alex "Superman" Johnson (born January 18, 1988) is a Canadian professional basketball player who currently plays for Toronto and Canada men's national 3x3 team. He was a member of the Hamilton Honey Badgers of the Canadian Elite Basketball League (CEBL).

He played college basketball at Cal State Bakersfield and then NC State. Johnson attended high school at Vaughan Road Academy in Toronto, Ontario. As a professional, he was named an NBL Canada All-Star with the Mississauga Power. Johnson was drafted with the first overall pick in the 2013 NBL Canada draft by the Ottawa SkyHawks.

== High school career ==
Johnson attended Vaughan Road Academy in Toronto, Ontario, where he was considered one of the top perimeter players of his class in Canada. As a senior at Vaughan, he averaged 18.8 points, 5.6 rebounds and 6.8 assists. He was also an honor roll student and an Academic All-Star.

== Collegiate career ==
Johnson started out his college basketball career with the Cal State Bakersfield Roadrunners, while attending the California State University at Bakersfield. He appeared in 26 games as a freshman and was named a starter in 17 of them. Despite having an injury interfere with his playing time towards the end of the season, Johnson had the 17th-best three-point field goal percentage in school history, shooting .416 from beyond the arc. He finished his freshman year averaging 8.3 points, 2.1 rebounds, 3.1 assists, and 1.4 three-pointers per game. Johnson transferred to North Carolina State to compete in his senior season.

== Professional career ==
Johnson was the first Canadian to ever be drafted first overall in the National Basketball League of Canada draft. Johnson was acquired from the now inactive Ottawa Skyhawks for Bol Kong on November 19, 2014. In his first season playing professionally in Canada, Johnson was nominated to become an NBL Canada All-Star along with teammate, Morgan Lewis. After leading the Mississauga Power franchise to its first playoff appearance in their inaugural season, Johnson returned for a second year to continue the momentum. In the 2014–15 season, Johnson had additional help with the re-signing of NBL Canada All-Star Morgan Lewis and re-acquirement of Tut Ruach. On December 29, 2014, he signed with the Saint John Mill Rats. On December 16, 2015, Johnson signed with the newly formed Halifax Hurricanes in the NBL Canada. Johnson signed with the Windsor Express a few days after the Hurricanes released him.

On October 30, 2016, Johnson was acquired by the Grand Rapids Drive of the NBA Development League. On January 4, 2017, he was waived by Grand Rapids. In 10 games, he averaged 2.1 points, 1.3 rebounds and 1.0 assists in 7.9 minutes. In the 2018–19 season, Johnson played for the London Lightning and averaged 9.4 points, 2.9 rebounds, and 3.7 assists per game. He was named to the All-Canadian Third Team.

== Personal life ==
On October 2, 2014, the Mississauga Power announced their partnership with BioSteel Sports Supplements Inc. and Peak Sports Canada. Johnson was selected to be the featured player to display the new Peak Sports Canada jersey and the BioSteel Sports Supplements product. That summer, BioSteel also became the exclusive sports drink provider for Canada Basketball. On April 16, 2014, the Toronto Raptors of the National Basketball Association (NBA) unveiled their new commercial to showcase their new marketing campaign, We The North. Johnson was allowed to make a cameo appearance. Johnson also runs his own basketball clinic called the Alex "Superman" Johnson Skills Academy. He is currently married to former Johnson C. Smith University college basketball player Brey Dorsett. Inspired by the movie Love & Basketball, he proposed to Dorsett after acting as if he had gotten injured while playing basketball. The video received over 3 million views and was commented on by multiple actors from the movie.
