= Chad Posthumus =

Canadian basketball player (1991–2024)

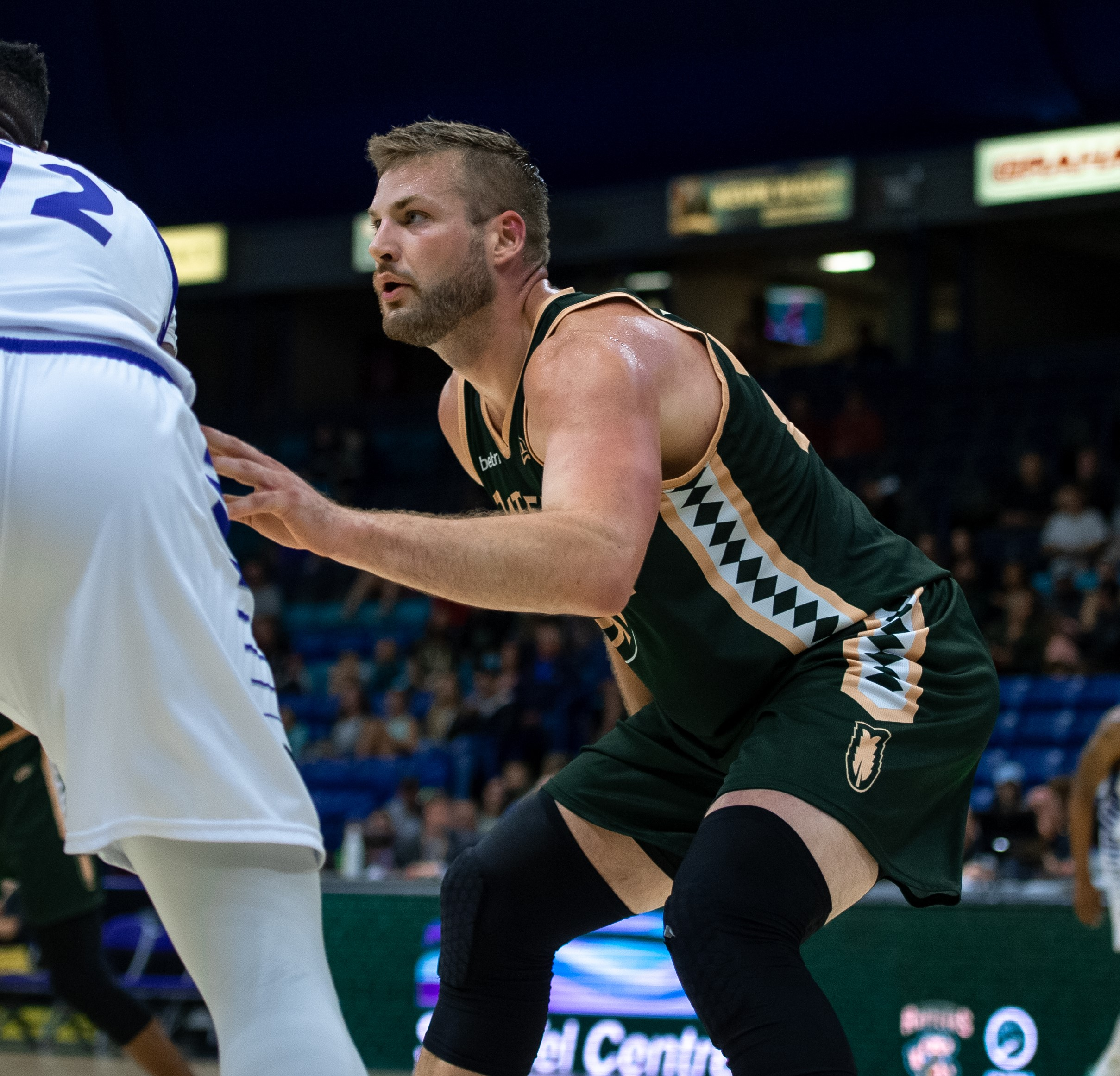
- Posthumus with the Rattlers in 2019

Personal information
- Born: February 12, 1991 Winnipeg, Manitoba, Canada
- Died: November 20, 2024 (aged 33) Winnipeg, Manitoba, Canada
- Listed height: 6 ft 10 in (2.08 m)
- Listed weight: 275 lb (125 kg)

Career information
- High school: River East (Winnipeg, Manitoba)
- College: UBC (2009–2011); Howard College (2011–2012); Morehead State (2012–2014)
- NBA draft: 2014: undrafted
- Playing career: 2014–2024
- Position: Centre
- Number: 33

Career history
- 2014: Levanga Hokkaido
- 2015: Mississauga Power
- 2015: Argentino de Junín
- 2015–2016: London Lightning
- 2016: Island Storm
- 2016: Kagoshima Rebnise
- 2016–2017: Hitachi SunRockers Tokyo-Shibuya
- 2017: Shinshu Brave Warriors
- 2019: Halifax Hurricanes
- 2019–2020: Saskatchewan Rattlers
- 2021: Ottawa Blackjacks
- 2021–2022: Edmonton Stingers
- 2022: Ottawa BlackJacks
- 2022–2023: Brampton Honey Badgers
- 2023–2024: Winnipeg Sea Bears

Career highlights
- No. 33 retired by Winnipeg Sea Bears; CEBL champion (2019); NCAA rebounding leader Top 5 (2014); All-OVC Third Team (2014)

Chad Ryan William Posthumus (February 12, 1991 – November 20, 2024) was a Canadian professional basketball player. He played collegiate basketball with UBC, Howard College, and Morehead State.

== High school career ==
Posthumus attended River East Collegiate, a high school located in Winnipeg, Manitoba in Canada. He was considered one of the top high school basketball players in the country as a senior, averaging 39 points, 25 rebounds, and 7 blocks. His career high with River East was a 69-point performance. Through his high school years, Posthumus led his team to two provincial quarterfinals and was named a provincial All-Star in his final two seasons with the Kodiaks.

== Collegiate career ==
Posthumus played with the Thunderbirds of the University of British Columbia for his first year university basketball season. In a total of 16 games played, he averaged 1.7 points and 2.8 rebounds. Nevertheless, his team finished the season with a 25–3 record and put together a 13-game winning streak as well. Posthumus did not play basketball in his second year season as a redshirt and would end up transferring to Howard College in Big Spring, Texas in the United States the following year. At Howard, the centre appeared in 24 contests and averaged 4.0 points and 3.2 rebounds. He shot .570 on field goals and .690 from the free throw line. The Hawks finished the season with a 23–8 record. Posthumus then transferred to Morehead State, in NCAA Division I as a redshirt junior. He played in all 33 of the Eagles' games and averaged 7.5 points and 6.8 rebounds. Posthumus also recorded two double-doubles and had career highs of 19 points and 19 rebounds against Oakland and SIU Edwardsville, respectively. Posthumus returned to Morehead State for his final college season and averaged 9.6 points off 51% shooting along with 10.9 rebounds per game which was the second highest in the nation. He also posted 10 double-doubles and following the season Posthumus earned College Sports Madness All-Ohio Valley Conference (OVC) honours and gained fame back in Canada.

== Professional career ==
Over the summer after his graduation, Posthumus signed with Chicago Bulls and participated in the NBA Summer League. On August 1, 2014, Posthumus signed his first professional contract with Levanga Hokkaido of the Japan Basketball League (JBL). Posthumus made his pro debut on October 11, 2014, against the Mitsubishi Diamond Dolphins, scoring 16 points and posting 13 rebounds. On November 23 and 24, in games vs the Tsukuba Robots, he recorded back-to-back double-doubles, grabbing a season-high 15 rebounds in the first contest. He finished his stint with the Japanese team averaging 10.1 points and 8.1 rebounds in 23 minutes per game.

On January 9, 2015, Posthumus inked a contract with the Mississauga Power of the National Basketball League of Canada (NBL). He debuted with the Power by scoring 34 points and posting 22 rebounds. In all three of his games, Posthumus put up double-doubles, but he failed to lead his team to any wins.

On January 22, 2015, Posthumus signed with Argentino de Junín of the Liga Nacional de Básquet in Argentina for the remainder of the season where he averaged 9.7 points and 4.9 boards.

On September 3, 2015, Posthumus signed with the London Lightning and made a return to the NBL Canada. He would play under former Power head coach Kyle Julius, who left the Power after the organization folded. On February 27, he was acquired by the Island Storm in exchange for the rights to Nick Evans.

Posthumus signed with the Saskatchewan Rattlers of the CEBL in 2019. He averaged 5.2 points and 4.6 rebounds per game. Posthumus re-joined the team the following year In August 2021, he signed with the Ottawa Blackjacks and became the first player in CEBL history to record a 20/20 when he recorded 23 points and 20 rebounds in Ottawa's CEBL quarter-final victory over the Hamilton Honey Badgers on August 14. Posthumus joined the Edmonton Stingers for the 2021–22 BCL Americas. On February 16, he re-signed with the Ottawa BlackJacks for the 2022 season. On March 2, 2023, the Winnipeg Sea Bears announced Posthumus as their first ever signing for their inaugural season. The Sea Bears announced that Posthumus re-signed with the team for the 2024 season on February 15, 2024.

== Personal life and death ==
Posthumus was diagnosed with type 1 diabetes at the age of seven. He was an advocate of incorporating sport and a healthy lifestyle into the management of diabetes.

As a redshirt sophomore, while attending Howard College, Posthumus was named an Academic All-American and a member of the Dean's List. He also earned a 4.0 grade point average (GPA).

Posthumus died in Winnipeg, Manitoba, on November 20, 2024, at the age of 33. He had suffered a brain aneurysm on November 9, followed by complications arising from corrective surgery. The Sea Bears retired the number 33 in his honour in their home opener of the 2025 CEBL Season.

== See also ==
- List of basketball players who died during their careers
