= Ian Fowler Executive of the Year Award =

Annual basketball award In Canada

The Ian Fowler Executive of the Year Award is an annual National Basketball League of Canada (NBL) award given since the 2011–12 season. It is awarded to the top member of the NBL Canada's executive committee, including the owners of the teams. The recipient is chosen by the league commissioner. It is one of two business awards given by the NBL, the other being New Franchise of the Year. Since its inception, the London Lightning have had two executives that have been selected, owner Vito Frijia in 2015 and general manager Taylor Brown in 2014. London is the only team in the league that has had more than one of its front office members win the award. Kimo Blanco of the Moncton Miracles was the first woman to be honored; in 2019–20 Melissa Melnychuk became the second.

The award is named after the late Ian R. Fowler, a Moncton city employee that played a major role in developing sport teams in the city, including the Miracles.

Season	Executive	Nationality	Team	Selected by
2011–12	Duncan Shaw	Canada	Summerside Storm	John Kennedy
2012–13	Kim Blanco	United States	Moncton Miracles	Andre Levingston
2013–14	Taylor Brown	Canada	London Lightning	Paul Riley
2014–15	Vito Frijia	Canada	London Lightning	Paul Riley
2015–16	Dartis Willis	United States	Windsor Express	Dave Magley
2016–17	Tyrone Levingston	United States	Cape Breton Highlanders	Dave Magley
2017–18	Jeff Dunlap	United States	St. John's Edge	Audley Stephenson
2018–19	Logan Stutz	United States	Sudbury Five	Audley Stephenson
2019–20	Melissa Melnychuk	Canada	KW Titans	Audley Stephenson
