= Nick Okorie =

American basketball player

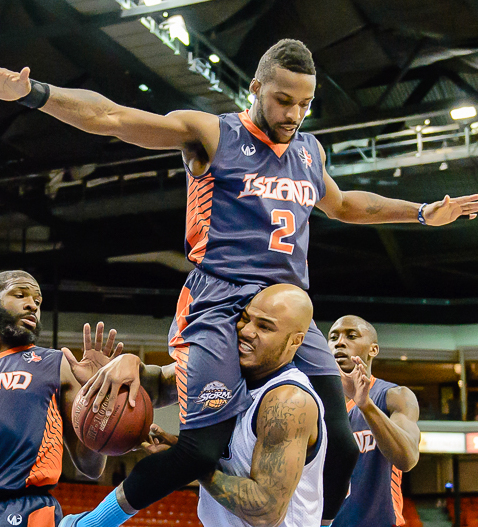
- Okorie (top) jumps on Tyrone Watson in 2015

No. 2 – Unifacisa
- Position: Point guard
- League: Liga Ouro

Personal information
- Born: July 22, 1988 (age 38) Minneapolis, Minnesota
- Listed height: 6 ft 1 in (1.85 m)
- Listed weight: 195 lb (88 kg)

Career information
- High school: Kempner (Sugar Land, Texas)
- College: South Plains (2006–2008); Texas Tech (2008–2010)
- NBA draft: 2010: undrafted
- Playing career: 2010–present

Career history
- 2010–2011: Salon Vilpas
- 2011–2012: Saar-Pfalz Braves
- 2012–2014: Oshawa/Mississauga Power
- 2014: Aalborg Vikings
- 2015: Island Storm
- 2015: WBC Wels
- 2015–2016: London Lightning
- 2016–2017: Island Storm
- 2017: Niagara River Lions
- 2017–2018: Universo/Vitória
- 2018: CR Vasco da Gama
- 2019: Unifacisa
- 2019-present: Horse Owners Club

Career highlights
- 3× All-NBL Canada Third Team (2013–2015); NBL Canada All-Star (2013); Big 12 All-Newcomer Team (2009)

Nick Okorie (born July 22, 1988) is an American professional basketball player for Horse Owners Club in Alexandria, Egypt. He played college basketball for South Plains College and Texas Tech.

== High school career ==
Okorie attended Kempner High School in Sugar Land, Texas, where he played basketball under head coach Ronnie Edwards. He was a member of the team's starting lineup for three years. He was named All-District in his final two seasons with the Cougars. Okorie averaged 19.7 points, 5.0 rebounds, and 5.0 assists per game as a senior and competed at the Texas High School Coaches Association (THSCA) All-Star Game.

== Collegiate career ==
Okorie played college basketball with the Texas Tech Red Raiders and South Plains College.

== Professional career ==
Okorie was named National Basketball League of Canada (NBL) All-Star in 2013, when he was with the Mississauga Power. Okorie has previously competed in the Danish Basketball League, 2. Basketball Bundesliga, and the Korisliiga outside of North America.

On September 30, 2015, Okorie signed with WBC Wels of the Austrian League.

On November 16, 2015, Okorie signed a training camp deal with the London Lightning in his return to the NBL Canada. He was acquired after the Lightning traded Renaldo Dixon and rights to Brent Jennings to the Island Storm. The Lightning also received the fifth and seventh picks in the 2015 NBL Canada draft. In October 2016, the Island Storm announced Okorie had signed to return for the 2016–17 season. On March 13, 2017, Okorie was traded to the Niagara River Lions in exchange for Mike Allison and Niagara's 2nd round pick in the All-Canadian draft.
