= NBL Canada Sixth Man of the Year Award =

Basketball award

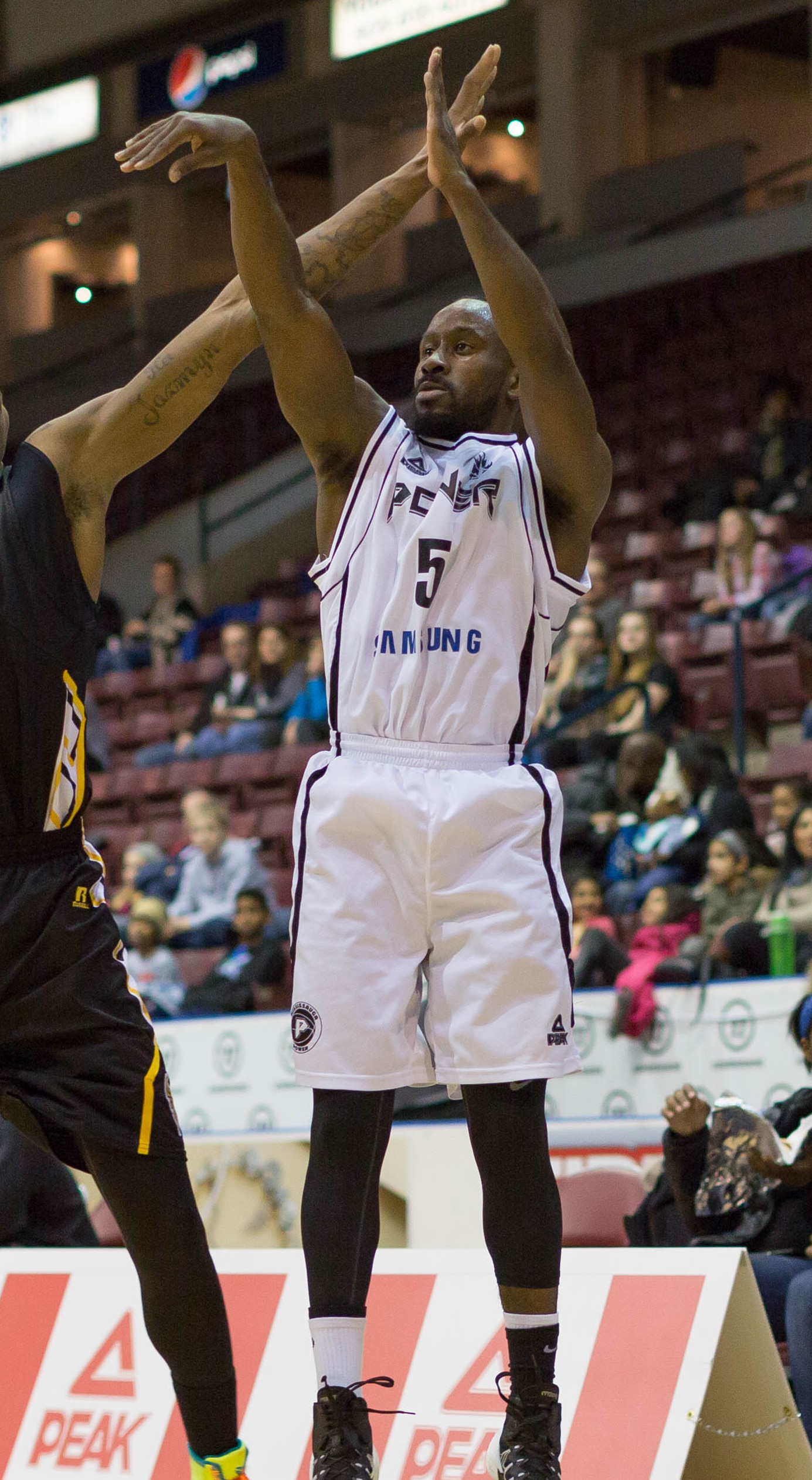
Omar Strong won the award in 2015

The NBL Canada Sixth Man of the Year Award, is an annual National Basketball League of Canada award given since the 2011–12 season. It is awarded to the league's best performing player for his team coming off the bench as a substitute (or sixth man). All award winners up to the 2017–18 season have been born in the United States.

== Winners ==
Season	Player	Position	Nationality	Team	Reference
2011–12	Eddie Smith	Guard	United States	London Lightning	
2012–13	Rodney Buford	Guard / forward	United States	London Lightning	
2013–14	Kirk Williams	Forward	United States	Mississauga Power	
2014–15	Omar Strong	Guard	United States	Mississauga Power	
2015–16	Mike Glover	Forward	United States	Halifax Hurricanes	
2016–17	Antoine Mason	Forward	United States	Halifax Hurricanes	
2017–18	Ta'Quan Zimmerman	Guard	United States	Halifax Hurricanes	
2018–19	Jamal Reynolds	Guard	Canada	Cape Breton Highlanders	
2019–20	J. R. Holder	Forward	United States	Sudbury Five	
2020-21	Not awarded — Season cancelled due to COVID-19 pandemic.				
2022	Terry Thomas	Forward	United States	London Lightning	
