= Warren Ward (basketball) =

Canadian basketball player

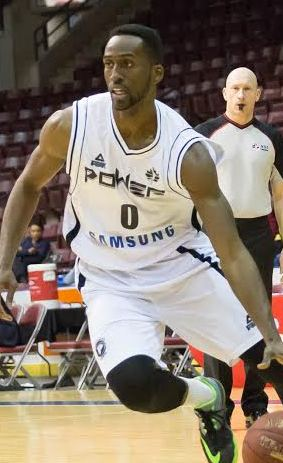
- Ward in February of 2015

Free agent
- Position: Shooting guard

Personal information
- Born: November 16, 1989 (age 36) London, Ontario
- Listed height: 6 ft 6 in (1.98 m)
- Listed weight: 210 lb (95 kg)

Career information
- College: Ottawa (2008–2013)
- NBA draft: 2013: undrafted
- Playing career: 2013–present

Career history
- 2013–2014: TBB Trier
- 2014: Grand Avignon-Sorgues
- 2015: Mississauga Power
- 2015–2016: London Lightning
- 2016–2017: Windsor Express
- 2017–2018: Cáceres

Career highlights
- NBL Canada Canadian of the Year (2016)
Medals
Men's basketball
Representing Canada
Universiade
Silver medal – second place	2011 Shenzhen	National team

Warren Andrew Ward (born November 16, 1989) is a Canadian professional basketball player who last played for Cáceres Patrimonio de la Humanidad of the Spanish LEB Oro. He played college basketball for the University of Ottawa.

== Collegiate career ==
Ward played at the college level at the University of Ottawa and ended his career there as its second all-time leader in points scored. He averaged 17.8 points, 7.6 rebounds, and 3.8 assists during his final season with the Gee Gees.

== Professional career ==
On January 9, 2015, Ward signed a contract with the Mississauga Power of the National Basketball League of Canada (NBL) in a return to his home country. One day later, he made his debut by recording 17 points and 9 rebounds against the Moncton Miracles. He grabbed a season-high 12 rebounds vs the Brampton A's on January 15 and notched a season-best 28 points against the Halifax Rainmen while recording 11 boards.

On September 8, 2015, Ward returned to the NBL Canada and signed with the London Lightning, a team that was coached by Kyle Julius, the same head coach he played under while with the Power. Julius said, "Warren brings a mental toughness and professionalism that will help our younger guys and allow us to play at a high level on a consistent basis. I am proud to have Warren as a member of our family, not only because he is a great basketball player, but also because he is someone I have a lot of respect for as a person." Following the season, Ward was named Canadian of the Year.

Ward played for Windsor Express during the 2016–17 season, before moving to Spain for playing with Cáceres Patrimonio de la Humanidad, of the Spanish second division.

== International career ==
Ward has experience representing Canada internationally, having played for his country in the 2011 Pan American Games and 2011 Summer Universiade. At the Universiade, his team placed second and, in turn, won the silver medal.
