= 2014 NBL Canada draft =

General information
- Date(s): August 24, 2014
- Time: 7:00 PM ET
- Location: Athlete Institute (Mono, Ontario)

Overview
- First selection: Jordan Weidner, Indiana Wesleyan

The 2014 NBL Canada Draft was held on August 24, 2014, at the Athlete Institute in Orangeville, Ontario. A total of 24 players were selected in three rounds. Jordan Weidner was selected by the Mississauga Power with the first overall pick.

== Draft ==
PG	Point guard	SG	Shooting guard	SF	Small forward	PF	Power forward	C	Center

Round	Pick	Player	Position	Nationality	Team	School/club team
1	1	Jordan Weidner	PG/SG	United States	Mississauga Power	Indiana Wesleyan
1	2	Jabs Newby	PG	Canada	Saint John Mill Rats	Gannon
1	3	Brandon Johnson	PG	United States	Moncton Miracles	Kentucky Wesleyan
1	4	Brendan Cooper	SG	United States	Island Storm	Fairmont State
1	5	Jahmal McQueen	SF/PF	Canada	Saint John Mill Rats	Windsor
1	6	John Hart	PG/SG	United States	London Lightning	IUPUI
1	7	Dylan Brewer	PG	United States	Brampton A's	York (Nebraska)
1	8	Michael Myers Keitt	SF	United States	Halifax Rainmen	Monmouth
2	9	Anthony Pettaway	C	United States	Mississauga Power	Defiance
2	10	Courtney Beach	SF	United States	Halifax Rainmen	Grays Harbor CC
2	11	Douglas Appiah	PG/SG	Canada	Moncton Miracles	California–Pennsylvania
2	12	Jordan Coleman	SG	United States	Island Storm	Valparaiso
2	13	John Paul Nyadaro	PF/C	Kenya	Saint John Mill Rats	Trevecca Nazarene
2	14	Delonte Taylor Jr.	SG	United States	London Lightning	St. Catharine (Kentucky)
2	15	Yvon Raymond	PG	United States	Brampton A's	Saint Peter's
2	16	Robert Dewar	C	Canada	Windsor Express	Alberta
3	17	Freddie Riley	SG	United States	Mississauga Power	UMass
3	18	Jasonn Hannibal	C	Canada	Halifax Rainmen	Portland
3	19	Matt Hunter	SG	United States	Moncton Miracles	Central Connecticut
3	20	Marquis Lee	SG	United States	Mississauga Power	St. Catharine (Kentucky)
3	21	Anthony Winbush	SF	United States	Saint John Mill Rats	Loyola (Maryland)
3	22	Maurice Foster	SG	United States	London Lightning	Oklahoma Baptist
3	23	Rashad Chase	PF	United States	Brampton A's	Georgia State
3	24	Trent Tornincasa	SG	Canada	Windsor Express	Glenville State
