= Omar Strong =

American basketball player

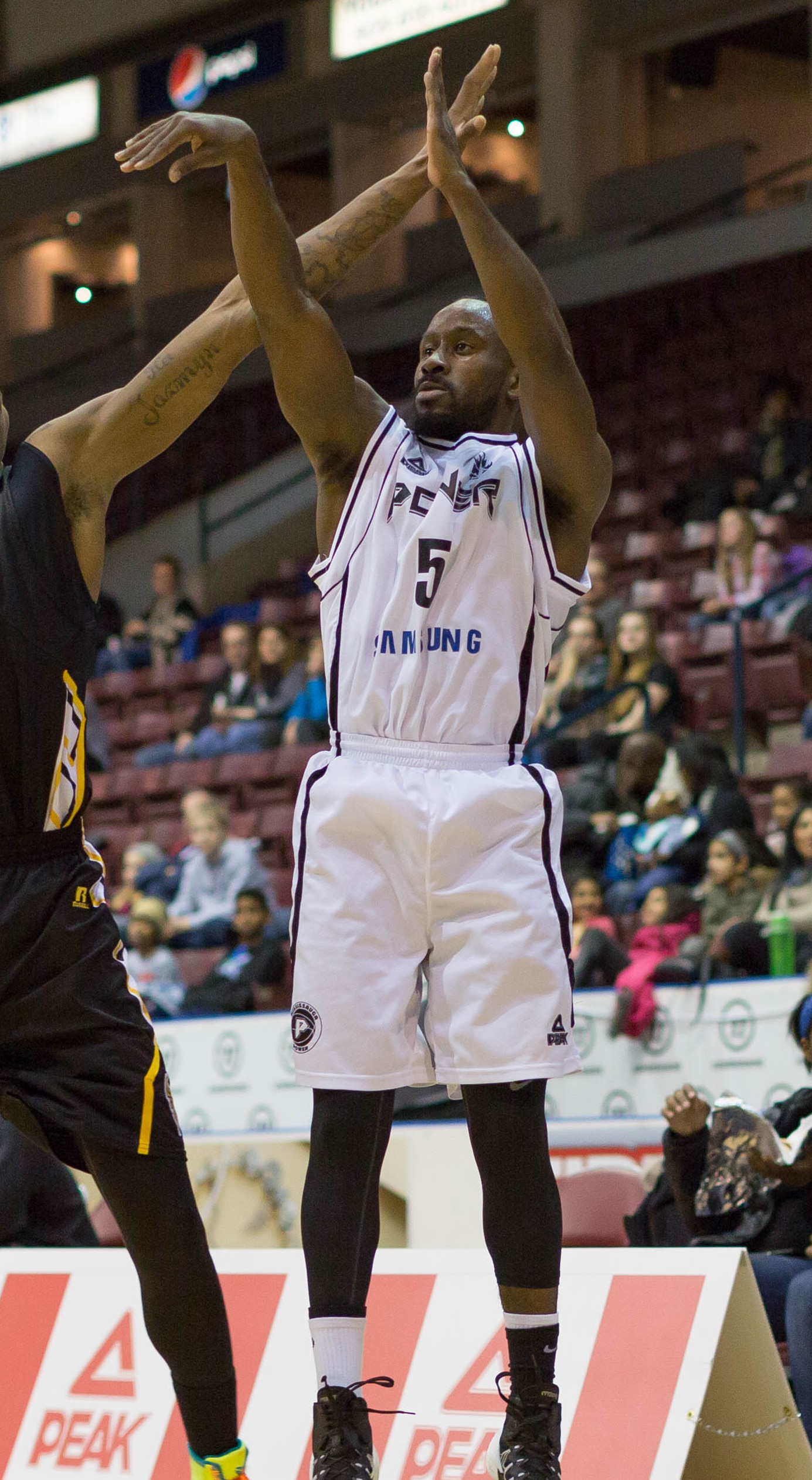
- Strong shoots the ball in 2015

Personal information
- Born: May 16, 1990 (age 36) Baltimore, Maryland, U.S.
- Listed height: 5 ft 9 in (1.75 m)
- Listed weight: 162 lb (73 kg)

Career information
- High school: Frederick Douglass (Baltimore, Maryland)
- College: Cecil College (2008–2011); Texas Southern (2011–2013)
- NBA draft: 2013: undrafted
- Playing career: 2013–2020
- Position: Point guard

Career history
- 2013: Pee Dee Vipers
- 2014: Beroe
- 2014–2015: Mississauga Power
- 2015–2016: UJAP Quimper 29
- 2016–2017: SVBD
- 2017–2018: Niagara River Lions
- 2018: Windsor Express
- 2020: London Lightning

Career highlights
- NBL Canada Sixth Man of the Year (2015); Second-team All-NBL Canada (2015); SWAC Player of the Year (2013); AP Honorable Mention All-America (2013); First-team All-SWAC (2013); Second-team All-SWAC (2012)

Omar Strong Sr. (born May 16, 1990) is an American former professional basketball player. In 2012–13, he was a senior at Texas Southern University and was named the Southwestern Athletic Conference Player of the Year.

== Early life ==
Strong was born on May 16, 1990, and brought up in Baltimore, Maryland.

== High school career ==
Strong attended Frederick Douglass High School in Baltimore, Maryland. Playing the point guard position, he averaged 22 points, four assists and three steals per game as a senior in 2007–08. That year Frederick Douglass won the Baltimore city title. Strong was named to The Baltimore Sun All-Metro team in each of his final two seasons.

== Collegiate career ==
=== Junior college ===
Due to poor academic performance, Strong was unable to commit to a four-year college basketball program right out of high school. He enrolled at Cecil College, a junior college in Maryland, to work on his academics while also gain some playing experience at the next level. He played for Cecil in 2008–09, took one season off to focus solely on school, then re-joined the team in 2010–11. Numerous mid-major universities offered him scholarships after his second season at Cecil. Strong ultimately chose to play for the Texas Southern Tigers, citing "I think I'll have a better experience if I go away."

=== Texas Southern ===
In 2011–12, his junior year, Strong led the Tigers in scoring. He guided them to the Southwestern Athletic Conference (SWAC) Tournament championship game, where the winner gains an automatic berth into the NCAA Tournament, but Texas Southern lost 71–69 to Mississippi Valley State; Strong scored 30 points in the loss. At the end of the season he was named to the All-SWAC Second Team.

Strong finished his collegiate career upon the conclusion of the 2012–13 season. He finished second in the conference in scoring with 17.0 points per game, made a school-record 120 three-pointers, and led the SWAC in free throw percentage (84.8%). The Tigers went 16–2 in conference games en route to being the regular season conference champion, and Strong was named the SWAC Player of the Year in addition to a First Team all-conference bid.

== Professional career ==
In February 2014 Strong signed a contract with Bulgarian club Beroe. He scored a season-high 24 points in a game against Spartak Pleven. He appeared in 9 games throughout the season, averaging 14.7 points, 1.6 rebounds and 1.8 assists per game. He joined Mississauga Power of NBL Canada for the 2014–15 season. On January 11, 2015, Strong scored a career-high 44 points against the Island Storm, also setting the franchise record in scoring. In the same match Strong set a league-high for NBL Canada in three point shots making 11. In 29 regular season games, Strong averaged 18.7 points, 2.8 rebounds and 2.6 assists per game on 32.7 minutes per game. On April 13, 2015, Strong was named Sixth Man of the Year of the NBL Canada. According to him, Mississauga Power head coach Kyle Julius "really saw something in him". He was named in the All-NBL Canada Second-team for the 2014–15 season. By the end of the 2014–15 season, he became the Power's all-time leader in three-pointers, with 148, passing Nick Okorie, who had 141.

On July 1, 2015, Strong signed with UJAP Quimper 29 of the Nationale Masculine 1 (NM1) in France.

On February 6, 2018, Strong signed with the Windsor Express of the National Basketball League of Canada.

Strong has competed in The Basketball Tournament, an annual winner-take-all team competition. In 2015, he competed for Team City of Gods, who made it to the semifinals before losing to eventual champion Overseas Elite. In 2021, he competed for B1 Ballers, who lost in the first round to Golden Eagles; he later won the tournament's "33-Point Contest", and a $33,333.33 prize, by besting seven other players in an individual competition to make 11 three-point field goals the fastest.

== Personal ==
Strong is the father of Omar Strong Jr., for whom he planned to return to Baltimore while in college. He said, "It's just like I know what I came up from. I want him to have everything I didn't and much more. If I'm [struggling to get] through something, I just think about my son and get through it." Strong often uses his son for motivation and inspiration.
