= NBL Canada draft =

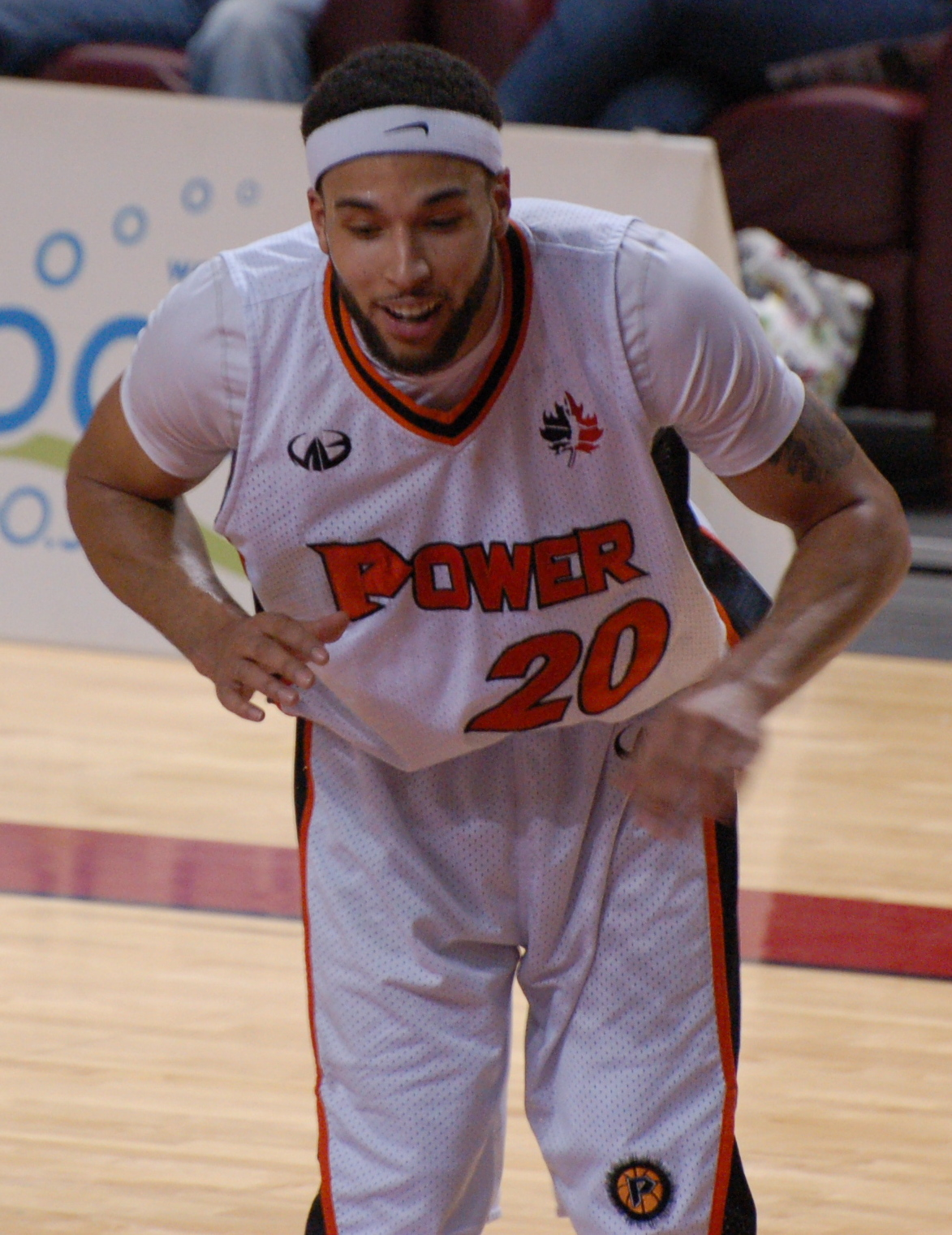
Morgan Lewis was the first draft pick in league history

The NBL Canada draft was an annual event in which each team from the National Basketball League of Canada (NBL) can draft players who are eligible and wish to join the league. Most of these players previously played college basketball in U Sports or the NCAA. Before becoming eligible, the players must participate in a pre-draft combine, and the list of players that attended the draft were officially decided.

Teams were allowed to trade picks during the draft as well. In 2012, the Summerside Storm received a first and third-round pick from the Halifax Rainmen in exchange for Troy Gottselig. This was the first recorded incident of such a kind. It is also typical for teams to make trades following the event. The most notable occurrence was Halifax's acquisition of Brandon Robinson, the reigning scoring champion and a future All-Star, from the Oshawa Power in 2012 for a future draft pick.

The first pick was, on most occasions, awarded to the team that finished with the worst record in the previous season. Teams may be allowed to select earlier in the case that they make a trade during or prior to the event. Only one first overall draft pick, Alex Johnson, previously played at an NCAA Division I school. Johnson attended North Carolina State University.

== List of drafts and first overall picks ==
Draft	Selected by	First selection	Nationality	Position	College/high school/former club	PPG	RPG	APG	Ref.
2011	Oshawa Power	Morgan Lewis	USA	Guard/forward	Findlay	16.8	6.8	3.7	
2012	Windsor Express	Robert Curtis	USA	Forward/center	Wayland Baptist	4.5	5.5	0.5	
2013	Ottawa SkyHawks	Alex Johnson	CAN	Guard	NC State	9.5	3.2	5.9	
2014	Mississauga Power	Jordan Weidner	USA	Guard	Indiana Wesleyan	8.2	2.5	2.1	
2015	Niagara River Lions	Erik Copes	USA	Forward	George Mason	0.0	0.0	0.0	
2016	Moncton Miracles	Leon Sutton	CAN	Guard	Great Falls	0.0	0.0	0.0	
2017	St. John's Edge	Aaron Williams	USA	Forward	Chicago State	3.1	2.2	0.4	
2018	Moncton Magic	Miles Seward	CAN	Guard	McMaster	19.1	4.0	2.3	

== See also ==
- Draft bust
