= 2015 NBL Canada draft =

General information
- Date(s): November 28, 2015
- Time: 7:00 PM ET
- Location: Athlete Institute (Mono, Ontario)

Overview
- First selection: Erik Copes, Niagara River Lions

The 2015 NBL Canada draft was held on November 28, 2015, at the Athlete Institute in Mono, Ontario. During the event, National Basketball League of Canada (NBL) teams took turns selecting amateur college basketball players. The new expansion team, the Niagara River Lions, were awarded the first overall pick and selected Erik Copes, a power forward from George Mason in the NCAA Division I. The eighth overall pick in the draft was defunct, due to the folding of the Mississauga Power team during the offseason. Both the River Lions and the Halifax Hurricanes made their first draft picks in franchise history. Matt McLean, out of Bishop's University, was the sole Canadian to be selected. The rest of the field was made up of Americans.

== Draft selections ==
Rnd.	Pick	Player	Pos.	Nationality	Team	School / club team
1	1	Erik Copes	F	United States	Niagara River Lions	George Mason
1	2	Brandan Kearney	G	United States	Moncton Miracles	Detroit
1	3	Corey Spence	G	United States	Saint John Mill Rats	Northern Colorado
1	4	Greg Foster	G	United States	Halifax Hurricanes	Saginaw Valley State
1	5	Koron Reed	F	United States	London Lightning	Shaw
1	6	Nick Carter	G	United States	Island Storm	LIU Post
1	7	Matt McLean	F	Canada	London Lightning	Bishop's University
1	8	Derek Thompson	G	United States	Windsor Express	Eastern Michigan
2	1	Kyle Meyer	F	United States	Niagara River Lions	Ohio Northern
2	2	Trevor Gruis	C	United States	Moncton Miracles	South Dakota
2	3	David Seagers	G	United States	Saint John Mill Rats	Dowling
2	4	Ryan Sypkens	G	United States	London Lightning	UC Davis
2	5	Bilal Benn	F	United States	Orangeville A's	Niagara
2	6	Robert Diggs	F	United States	Orangeville A's	George Washington
2	7	Antonio Garrett	F	United States	Halifax Hurricanes	College of Idaho
2	8	Jamil Dudley	F	United States	Halifax Hurricanes	Lake Erie
3	1	Uchechi Ogbonna	F	United States	Niagara River Lions	Daemen
3	2	Julian Lewis	F	United States	Moncton Miracles	Lewis
3	3	Akeem Bennett	G	United States	Saint John Mill Rats	St. Francis Brooklyn
3	4	Garland Judkins	G	United States	London Lightning	Texas A&M–CC
3	5	Kenneth Green	F	United States	Orangeville A's	Clark Atlanta
3	6	Daniel O'Keefe	F	United States	Orangeville A's	Keiser
3	7	Armani Cotton	G	United States	Halifax Hurricanes	Yale
3	8	Ahman Fells	F	United States	Saint John Mill Rats	Illinois–Chicago
