= Morgan Lewis (basketball) =

American basketball player

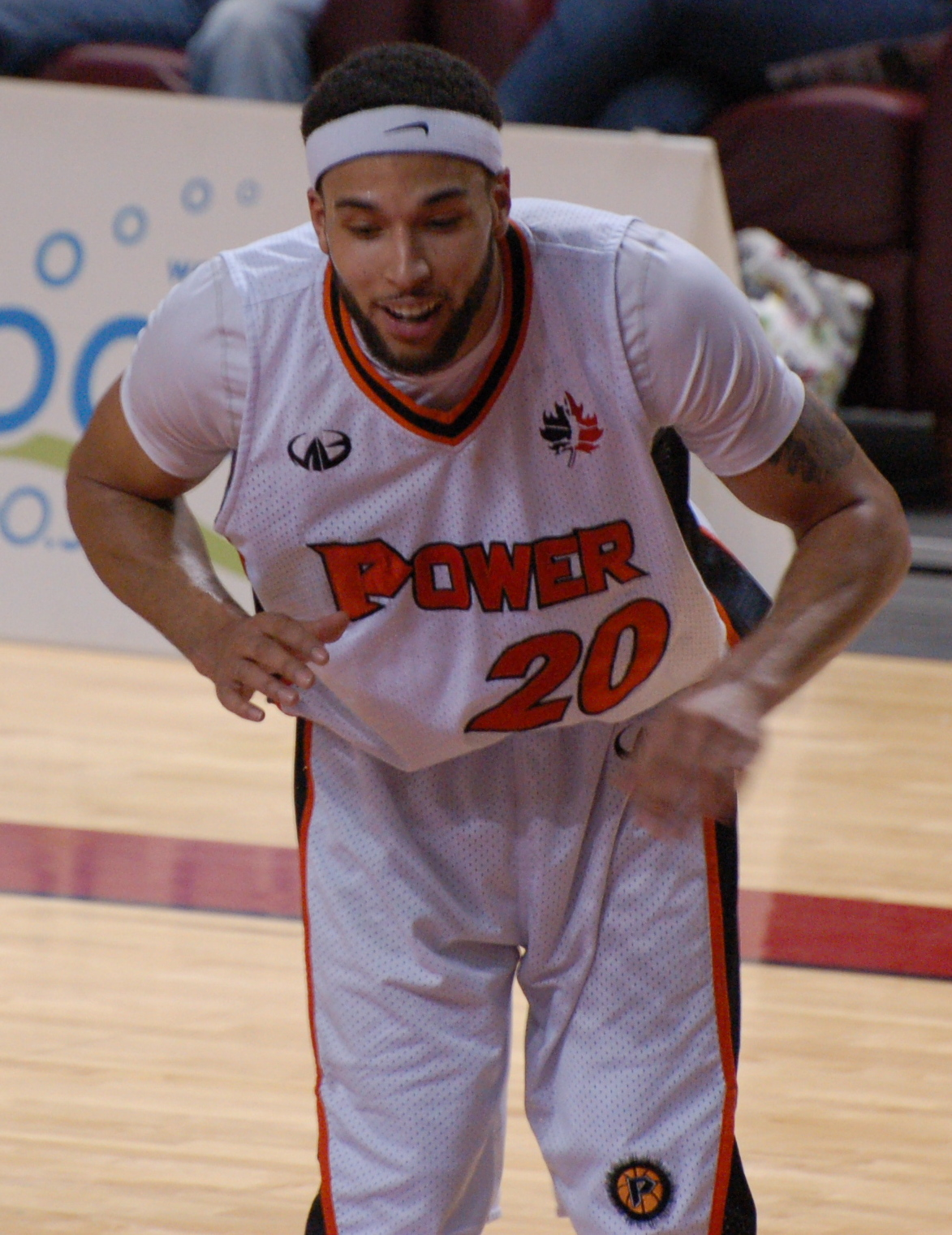
- Lewis with the Oshawa Power in 2012

Free agent
- Position: Shooting guard / small forward

Personal information
- Born: February 10, 1987 (age 39) Painesville, Ohio
- Listed height: 6 ft 4 in (1.93 m)
- Listed weight: 190 lb (86 kg)

Career information
- High school: Harvey (Painesville, Ohio)
- College: Findlay (2006–2010)
- NBA draft: 2010: undrafted
- Playing career: 2010–present

Career history
- 2010: KR Basket
- 2010–2011: ETB Wohnbau
- 2011–2013: Oshawa Power
- 2012–2014: London Lightning
- 2013–2015: Mississauga Power
- 2014–2015: Al-Hilal
- 2016: Island Storm
- 2016–2017: Cape Breton Highlanders

Career highlights
- 2× NBL Canada All-Star (2012, 2014)

Morgan Lewis (born February 10, 1987) is an American professional basketball player who last played for the Cape Breton Highlanders of the National Basketball League of Canada (NBL Canada). He was a two-time NBL Canada All-Star in his years with the Mississauga Power.

== College career ==
Before playing professionally, Lewis led NCAA University of Findlay to a perfect record going 36–0 en route to win the NCAA Division 2 Championship in 2009. During that year, Lewis was awarded the National Tournament MVP, NCAA National All Tournament Team and NCAA Regional All Tournament Team.

=== Team OVO ===
Grammy Award Winning Artist, Drake annually organizes a summer basketball tournament called OVO Bounce. Lewis is one of the few players that were hand-picked by the hip-hop star to join his team and compete in this prestigious tournament in Toronto.

== Professional career ==
In February, 2010, Lewis signed with KR Basket of the Icelandic Úrvalsdeild for the remainder of the season. In five regular season games, Lewis averaged 15.8 points and 5.0 rebounds. In the playoffs, he upped the averages to 23.4 points and 6.4 rebounds, helping KR to the semi-finals where they lost to eventual champions Snæfell.

Lewis is the first ever player drafted in the inaugural 2011 NBL Canada draft by the Oshawa Power – now relocated to Mississauga.

Lewis was named NBLC Player of the Week on Feb 2, 2014 for the second time in his professional career in Canada. Previously, Lewis won this award with London Lightning on November 18, 2012

At the conclusion of the 2013–2014 season, Lewis was nominated for the second time of his career to become a NBLC All-Star along with Mississauga Power teammate, Alex Johnson.
