= Bol Kong =

Sudanese basketball player (born 1988)

Personal information
- Born: January 4, 1988 (age 38) Kassala, Sudan
- Listed height: 6 ft 6 in (1.98 m)
- Listed weight: 220 lb (100 kg)

Career information
- High school: St. Georges (Vancouver)
- College: Douglas (2007–2008); Gonzaga (2009–2010); NAIT (2010–2011); St. Francis Xavier (2011–2012)
- NBA draft: 2012: undrafted
- Playing career: 2013–2014
- Position: Forward

Career history
- 2013–2014: Ottawa SkyHawks

Career highlights
- CCAA champion (2008)

Bol Kong (born January 4, 1988) is a former South Sudanese-Canadian professional basketball player who played one year for the Ottawa SkyHawks of the National Basketball League of Canada (NBL).

== Early life ==
Kong was born on January 4, 1988, in Kassala, Sudan and moved with his family to Canada as a refugee at age 6. He later received Canadian dual citizenship.

== College career ==
He played college basketball with four different schools within Canada and the United States: Douglas College, Gonzaga University, Northern Alberta Institute of Technology, and St. Francis Xavier University. At Douglas, he was a member of the 2007–08 Canadian Collegiate Athletic Association (CCAA) championship team and he was named to the All-Tournament team. Kong was also named All-Canadian at NAIT.

== Professional career ==
Kong was drafted by the Mississauga Power with the fourth overall pick in the 2013 NBL Canada draft, but signed with the Ottawa SkyHawks on November 20, 2013, instead.
