= Paul Cooper (basketball) =

American basketball player

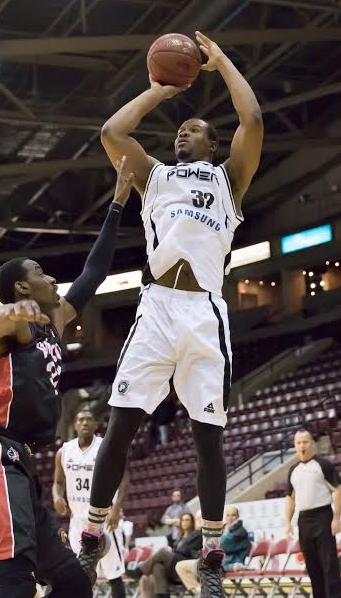
- Cooper takes a shot against the Windsor Express

Personal information
- Born: February 1, 1990 (age 36) Winter Haven, Florida
- Listed height: 6 ft 8 in (2.03 m)
- Listed weight: 235 lb (107 kg)

Career information
- High school: Auburndale (Auburndale, Florida)
- College: Gulf Coast CC (2008–2009); Texas Tech (2010–2011); Arkansas Tech (2012–2013)
- NBA draft: 2014: undrafted
- Playing career: 2014–2018
- Position: Forward

Career history
- 2014–2015: Mississauga Power
- 2015–2016: Island Storm
- 2016: Windsor Express
- 2016–2017: KW Titans
- 2017–2018: BC Rustavi

Paul Cooper, Jr. (born February 1, 1990) is an American former professional basketball player who last played for BC Rustavi of the Georgian Superliga. He played college basketball at Gulf Coast Community College, Texas Tech, and Arkansas Tech.

== High school career ==
Cooper attended Auburndale High School in Auburndale, Florida, where he played basketball under head coach Eric Robinson. As a senior, he averaged 15 points and 9 rebounds and was named Class 5-A All-State Honorable Mention.

== Collegiate career ==
Cooper played college basketball with Gulf Coast State College as a freshman. He then transferred to Texas Tech of the NCAA Division I. However, he closed his career playing for Arkansas Tech.

== Professional career ==
Following an unsuccessful 2014 NBA draft, Cooper signed with the Mississauga Power of the National Basketball League of Canada (NBL) for his rookie season.

On October 1, 2015, Cooper signed with the London Lightning, however, he was waived before the start of the season. On December 30, he was acquired by the Island Storm, however, he was waived on January 8, 2016. Nine days later, he signed with the Windsor Express. On February 3, he was waived by Windsor.

Cooper signed with the KW Titans for its first year of existence in the 2016–17 NBL Canada season.
