= 2013 NBL Canada draft =

The 2013 NBL Canada Draft was held on August 19, 2013, at Hilton Suites Conference Centre & Spa in Markham, Ontario. A total of 29 players were selected, in three rounds. Alex Johnson was selected with the first overall pick by the Ottawa SkyHawks, becoming the first Canadian to be the top pick in the NBL Canada Draft. Johnson did not appear for the SkyHawks, as he was traded to the Mississauga Power for Bol Kong.

== Draft ==
PG	Point guard	SG	Shooting guard	SF	Small forward	PF	Power forward	C	Center

Round	Pick	Player	Position	Nationality	Team	School/club team
1	1	Alex Johnson	PG	Canada	Ottawa SkyHawks	NC State
1	2	Brent Jennings	SG	United States	Brampton A's	Southern Poly
1	3	Raven Barber	PF	United States	Halifax Rainmen (from Laval)	Mount St. Mary's
1	4	Bol Kong	SF	Sudan; Canada	Mississauga Power	St. Francis Xavier
1	5	Gerard Devaughn	PF	United States	Halifax Rainmen	Stillman
1	6	Jermel Kennedy	PF	Canada	Moncton Miracles	Lander
1	7	Mike Luby	C	Canada	Saint John Mill Rats	Brock
1	8	Denarryl Rice	PG	United States	Windsor Express	Arkansas Tech
1	9	Shawn Vanzant	PG	United States	Island Storm	Butler
1	10	Raheem Singleton	PG	United States	London Lightning	Maine
2	11	Manock Lual	SF	Sudan; Canada	Ottawa SkyHawks	UPEI
2	12	Niko Brooks	PG	United States	Brampton A's	Westmont
2	13	Willie Whitfield	PF	United States	London Lightning (from Laval)	Barry
2	14	Dwight McCombs	PF/C	United States	Mississauga Power	Central Florida
2	15	James Marcellus	PF	United States	Halifax Rainmen	Delaware State
2	16	Aleksandar Mitrović	SF	Serbia; Canada	Moncton Miracles	McGill
2	17	David Louis	C	United States	Saint John Mill Rats	Kingsborough CC
2	18	Marcus James	F	United States	Windsor Express	Sam Houston State
2	19	Ryan Martin	PG	United States	Summerside Storm	Keene State
2	20	Colin Nickerson	SG	United States	London Lightning	Fairfield
3	21	Jerome Brown	SG	Canada	Ottawa SkyHawks	Panola CC
3	22	Jayson Obazuaye	SG	Nigeria; United States	Brampton A's	Colorado
3	23	Eric Petty, Jr.	F	United States	Mississauga Power	Mississippi Valley State
3	24	Jason Dawson	PG	United States	Halifax Rainmen	Mount Vernon Nazarene
3	25	Anto Raic	PF	Serbia; Canada	Moncton Miracles	Brock
3	26	Alex Jackson	SF	United States	Saint John Mill Rats	Missouri–St. Louis
3	27	Keoni Watson	PG	United States	Halifax Rainmen (from Windsor)	Idaho
3	28	Justin Leemow	SG	United States	Island Storm	North Carolina Central
3	29	Branko Veljović	SG	Serbia; Canada	Mississauga Power (from London)	Hannibal–LaGrange
