= Jushay Rockett =

American basketball player

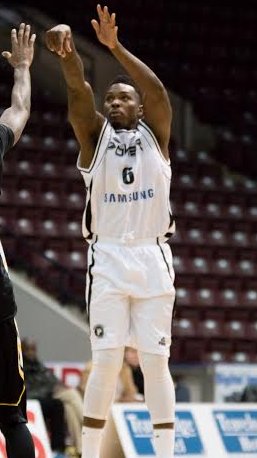
- Rockett in 2015

Free agent
- Position: Forward

Personal information
- Born: February 4, 1984 (age 41); Long Beach, California, U.S.
- Listed height: 6 ft 5 in (1.96 m)
- Listed weight: 235 lb (107 kg)

Career information
- High school: Long Beach Poly (Long Beach, California)
- College: Arizona Western (2003–2005); Texas State (2005–2006); Alaska Fairbanks (2006–2007)
- NBA draft: 2007: undrafted
- Playing career: 2007–present

Career history
- 2012–2015: Mississauga Power

Career highlights and awards
- NBL Canada All-Defence Second Team (2013)

Jushay Rockett (born February 4, 1984) is an American professional basketball player who last played for the Mississauga Power of the National Basketball League of Canada (NBL).
