= Jordan Weidner =

American basketball player and coach

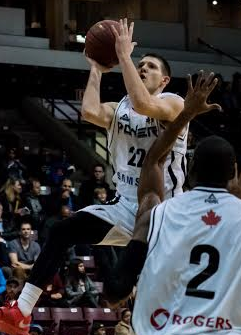
- Weidner as a rookie in 2015

Personal information
- Listed height: 6 ft 2 in (1.88 m)
- Listed weight: 195 lb (88 kg)

Career information
- High school: Danville (Danville, Indiana)
- College: Indiana Wesleyan (2010–2014)
- NBA draft: 2014: undrafted
- Playing career: 2014–2016
- Position: Guard
- Number: 22, 4
- Coaching career: 2017–present

Career history

Playing
- 2014–2015: Mississauga Power
- 2015–2016: London Lightning

Coaching
- 2017–2019: Indiana Wesleyan (GA)
- 2019–present: Grace (assistant)

Career highlights
- NAIA Division II Tournament MVP (2014); First-team NAIA All-American (2014); Second-team NAIA All-American (2013); Honorable mention NAIA All-American (2012); Crossroads League Player of the Year (2014); 2× First-team All-Crossroads League (2013, 2014)

Jordan Weidner is an American former professional basketball player and current assistant coach for Grace College. He played two seasons in the National Basketball League of Canada (NBL). He played college basketball for Indiana Wesleyan.

== College career ==
Weidner played college basketball at Indiana Wesleyan University and left the program as its all-time leader in assists and scored the third-most points in school history. At Indiana Wesleyan, he was the only player in its history to earn National Association of Intercollegiate Athletics All-American honors on three occasions. In 2014, he led the Wildcats to their first-ever NAIA Division II National Championship victory. and was named the tournament's Chuck Taylor MVP, as well as first team all-American.

== Professional career ==
He was selected by the Power with the first overall pick in the 2014 NBL Canada draft.

On October 1, 2015, Weidner signed with the London Lightning of the NBL Canada. The team would be coached by Kyle Julius, who directed the Power squad during Weidner's rookie season. On January 22, 2016, Weidner was placed on injured reserve with a concussion.

== Coaching career ==
Weidner turned to coaching in 2017, joining the staff at his alma mater as a graduate assistant. In 2019 he was hired as an assistant at Grace College.
