= Marcus Capers =

American basketball player (born 1989)

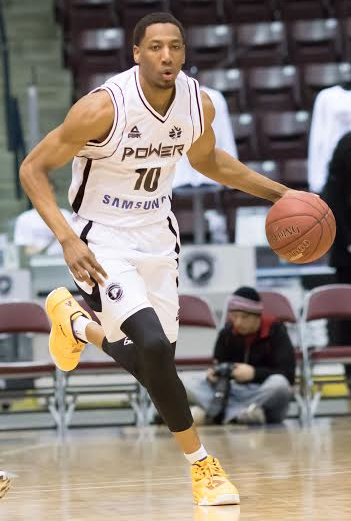
- Capers with the ball in 2015

No. 4 – London Lightning
- Position: Guard
- League: NBL Canada

Personal information
- Born: December 21, 1989 (age 36) Winter Haven, Florida
- Listed height: 6 ft 4 in (1.93 m)
- Listed weight: 179 lb (81 kg)

Career information
- High school: Lake Region (Eagle Lake, Florida) Montverde Academy (Montverde, Florida)
- College: Washington State (2008–2012)
- NBA draft: 2012: undrafted
- Playing career: 2012–present

Career history
- 2012–2013: Torpan Pojat
- 2013–2014: Osaka Evessa
- 2014: Helsinki Seagulls
- 2014–2015: Mississauga Power
- 2015–present: London Lightning
- 2020: Fraser Valley Bandits

Career highlights
- NBL Canada Defensive Player of the Year (2020); 2× NBL Canada champion (2017, 2018)

Marcus Jerome Capers (born December 21, 1989) is an American professional basketball player for the London Lightning of the National Basketball League of Canada (NBL Canada). He played college basketball for Washington State.

== Early life ==
Capers was born and raised in Winter Haven, Florida, a city in the central area of the state. His parents are Frankie and Gaynell Capers. In his childhood, he had hoped to become a basketball player and then a high school coach. Capers said, "Having played the game brings a different level of respect."

== High school career ==
Capers attended Lake Region High School in Eagle Lake, Florida and played high school basketball under head coach David Saltman.

As a freshman with Lake Region, Capers led the junior varsity team with 18 points per game. He also led them to a second-place finish at the Polk County JV championship.

In his sophomore season Capers moved up to the varsity team, and averaged the second-most points and most rebounds on the team. Lake Region became district champions and regional runners-up that year, earning Capers All-Polk County honors.

He was named a captain as a junior and averaged 17 points, 7 rebounds, and 6 assists per game. His team made yet another appearance at the district championship for the second straight season. At the end of the season, some of the honors he earned were 2007 Polk County News Chief All-Area Player of the Year, Lakeland Ledger First Team, and class 5A honorable mention.

Before his senior season, Capers transferred to Montverde Academy in Montverde, Florida. By the end of the year, he was averaging 16 points, 8 rebounds, and 5 assists per contest. He garnered class 2A third-team All-State accolades and was named to the Vince Carter Shootout and Montverde Academy Invitational all-tournament teams. Montverde, as a team, finished the season with an undefeated 30–0 record and were ranked No. 4 nationally by USA Today. Montverde coach Kevin Sutton praised Capers by saying, "He’s a tremendous athlete who can slash and finish at the rim."

=== Recruiting profile ===
Capers was rated a three-star recruit, the 10th best in Florida, and the 30th best in the Class of 2008 for his position by Rivals.com. He was interested in college basketball programs such as Clemson, George Washington, Ole Miss, Penn State, VCU, and Washington State. He received offers and visited the latter two schools but committed to Washington State on October 5, 2007. Junior Taylor Rochestie intentionally gave up his athletic scholarship, allowing the incoming freshman, Capers to join.

== College ==
While attending Washington State University, Capers played in 135 games, the most contests a player from that school had appeared in since George Hamilton about sixty years prior.

== The Basketball Tournament ==
Marcus Capers played for Team Tampa 20/20 in the 2018 edition of The Basketball Tournament. He scored five points and had a game-high 11 rebounds in the team's first-round loss to Ram Nation.

== Personal life ==
His brother, Kevin, is also a professional basketball player who played college basketball for Florida Southern College and later professionally in Mexico, Romania, Iceland and Israel.
