= Mike Allison (basketball) =

Canadian basketball player (born 1990)

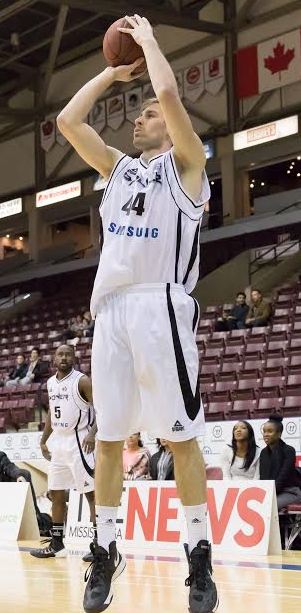

No. 44 – Windsor Express
- Position: Power forward / center

Personal information
- Born: August 4, 1990 (age 36) Hamilton, Ontario
- Listed height: 6 ft 9 in (2.06 m)
- Listed weight: 220 lb (100 kg)

Career information
- High school: National Elite Development Academy (Lynden, Ontario)
- College: Maine (2009–2013)
- NBA draft: 2013: undrafted
- Playing career: 2013–present

Career history
- 2013–2014: Durham Wildcats
- 2014–2015: Mississauga Power
- 2015–2018: Niagara River Lions
- 2018–2019: Gifu Swoops

Career highlights
- 2× America East All-Defensive Team (2012, 2013)

Michael Allison (born August 4, 1990) is a Canadian professional basketball player for the Gifu Swoops of the Japanese B.League. He played college basketball at the University of Maine with the Black Bears. Allison also has experience playing with the Durham Wildcats of the British Basketball League.

== Early life ==
Allison was born on August 4, 1990, Eileen Margrate and Wayne David Allison and grew up in Lynden, Ontario. His father had attended Wooster College and had experience with the Canada men's national basketball team. Mike attended St. Mary's Catholic Secondary School and went on to become school Athlete of the Year and the team's Most Valuable Player. Later, Allison trained at the National Elite Development Academy in Lynden and was eventually selected to play for the Canadian junior national team.

== Professional career ==
In September 2013, Allison signed a one-year contract with the Durham Wildcats of the British Basketball League after being awarded an athletic scholarship by Durham University to study for a master's degree. He quickly became one of the league's top shot-blockers and rebounders.

For the following season, Allison competed with the Mississauga Power of the National Basketball League of Canada. In the summer of 2015, he played with Blessed Sacrament Nation in the North of the Border Basketball League. Allison returned to the NBL Canada for the next year with the Niagara River Lions.

== International career ==
In 2009, Allison joined the Canadian junior national team for Mondial Juniors de Basket in France, which was regarded as one of the top basketball competitions in Europe at that level. In the tournament, Allison averaged 6.2 points and 3.2 rebounds per game as his team took the gold medal. He most notably recorded 11 points and six rebounds in the championship game victory over Lithuania. Highlighting Lithuania's squad was Donatas Motiejūnas, while Canada was led by Kelly Olynyk. Allison also competed with the national team at the Under-18 World Qualifier, where Canada finished third.
