= Kirk Williams Jr. =

American basketball player

Personal information
- Born: June 22, 1986 (age 39) White Plains, New York, U.S.
- Listed height: 6 ft 7 in (2.01 m)
- Listed weight: 200 lb (91 kg)

Career information
- High school: Woodlands (Hartsdale, New York)
- College: Longwood (2005–2008); Bridgeport (2009–2010)
- NBA draft: 2010: undrafted
- Playing career: 2012–present
- Position: Forward

Career history
- 2012–2014: Oshawa / Mississauga Power
- 2014–2016: Windsor Express
- 2016–2017: Niagara River Lions
- 2017–2019: London Lightning
- 2019–2020: Windsor Express
- 2021–2022: Sudbury Five

Career highlights
- CEBL champion (2020); NBL Canada Finals MVP (2015); NBL Canada champions (2015); NBL Canada Sixth Man of the Year (2014); First-team All-Independent (2008)

Kirk Williams Jr. is an American former professional basketball player who played in the National Basketball League of Canada (NBL) for several teams, including the London Lightning. He played the small forward and power forward positions. Williams played high school basketball for Woodlands High School in Hartsdale, New York and moved on to compete with Longwood and Bridgeport in college. In 2014, he was named NBL Canada Sixth Man of the Year, and in 2015 helped the Express win the championship and became the Finals' Most Valuable Player. In 2018, he won another championship with the London Lightning.

== Early life and career ==
Williams was born in White Plains, New York to Kirk Williams Sr. and Margaret Turner. He has one sister, Dashonda Turner.

Kirk Williams Jr. Is married to April Mercado-Williams and they have 4 kids together, named Angel, Abigail, Kirk Jr. and Jove Kai Mercado-Williams.

Kirk Jr. attended Woodlands High School in Hartsdale, New York, where he played varsity basketball for three seasons and football for two seasons. As a junior, he averaged 16.5 points per game. In his senior season, Williams averaged 17.1 points, 7.6 rebounds, and 2.5 steals, helping his team finish with an 18–5 record. He also earned All-State and all-conference honors.

== College career ==
Williams played his first three seasons of college basketball at Longwood University with the Lancers under head coach Mike Gillian. He capped his freshman year averaging 7.6 points, 4.1 rebounds, and 1.1 assists. Williams played his final year of college basketball at the University of Bridgeport with the Purple Knights.
