= Vito Frijia =

Italian-Canadian businessman and construction engineer

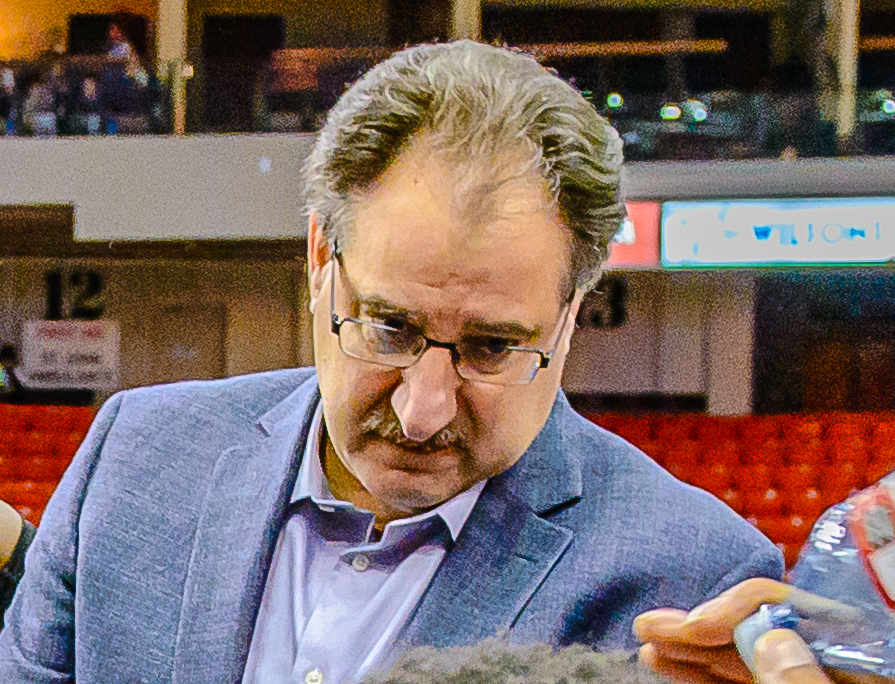
- Frijia with the Lightning in 2015
- Born: Italy
- Education: Fanshawe College
- Occupations: Businessman, construction engineer

Vito Frijia is an Italian-Canadian businessman and construction engineer. He is currently the owner of the London Lightning of the National Basketball League of Canada (NBL). At the league's Board of Governors' meeting in May 2015, he was unanimously voted the President of the NBL Canada. Frijia is also the president of the Southside Group, who have contributed to the construction of several prominent buildings in Southwestern Ontario.

== Early life ==
Frijia moved to Canada from Italy when he was 8 years old. He attended Fanshawe College in London, Ontario, and played for their men's basketball team from 1979 to 1981 under head coach Glenn Johnston. He became their captain and led them to two consecutive Ontario Colleges Athletic Association (OCAA) provincial and Canadian Collegiate Athletic Association (CCAA) national titles. He was named Most Valuable Player of the 1981 national championship after scoring 21 points and was later named the school's Athlete of the Year and to the OCAA All-Millennium team. Frijia's team was inducted into the London Sports Hall of Fame in 2013, after he was inducted into the OCAA Hall of Fame as a player in 2007.

== Construction ==
Frijia graduated from Fanshawe in 1982 as an aspiring construction engineer. He replaced the owner of the Southside Group in 1983, becoming the leader of a construction company that was completing more than $2 billion worth in development projects around Southwestern Ontario.
