= Doug Thomas (basketball) =

American basketball player (born 1983)

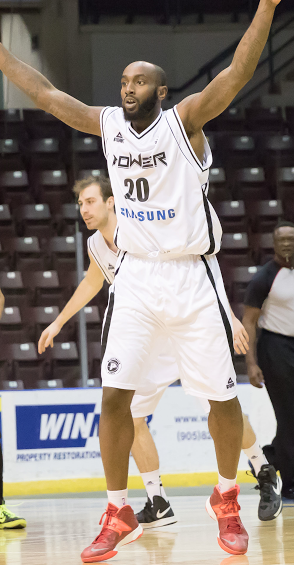
- Thomas with the Mississauga Power in 2015

Personal information
- Born: September 20, 1983 (age 42) Los Angeles, California, U.S.
- Listed height: 6 ft 9 in (2.06 m)
- Listed weight: 235 lb (107 kg)

Career information
- High school: Inglewood (Inglewood, California)
- College: Southeastern CC (2002–2004); Iowa (2004–2006)
- NBA draft: 2006: undrafted
- Playing career: 2006–2016
- Position: Power forward / center

Career history
- 2006–2007: BBC Monthey
- 2007–2008: Iowa Energy
- 2008: Trotamundos de Carabobo
- 2009: Sundsvall Dragons
- 2009: Abejas de Guanajuato
- 2009–2011: Reno Bighorns
- 2011: Kirchheim Knights
- 2011–2012: Reno Bighorns
- 2012: Petron Blaze Boosters
- 2012: Iowa Energy
- 2012: Al Kuwait
- 2012: Orange County Novastars
- 2013: Guaros de Lara
- 2013–2014: Bakersfield Jam
- 2014: North Dallas Vandals
- 2015–2016: Mississauga Power

Career highlights
- Ligan champion (2009)

Douglas Kim Thomas II (born September 20, 1983) is an American professional basketball player who last played for the Mississauga Power of the National Basketball League of Canada (NBL). He has played professionally in Venezuela, Mexico, Romania, Sweden, and the Philippines. In 2011, he was invited to the San Antonio Spurs training camp.

Thomas was a member of the Iowa Hawkeyes where he won the Big-10 Conference Sixth Man of the Year. Thomas graduated from the University of Iowa with a BS in African-American Studies after transferring from Southeastern Community College, where he played his first two years of collegiate basketball.

== High school ==
Thomas attended Inglewood High School in California as a prep senior after attending Pasadena High School as a junior. There, he was two-time All-Conference selection in California. He was also selected to ABE All-Star contest and Hoops at the Beach contest and was 1st Team All-League and 2nd Team All-CIF as a sophomore.

Thomas led his high school team to the Pacific League Championship in consecutive seasons, averaging 21 points, 11 rebounds, seven assists and three blocked shots as a senior and 12 points, 10 rebounds as a junior.

== Prep School ==
Following high school, Thomas attended Christian Faith Center Academy in Creedmoor, North Carolina for one year, where he averaged 21 points, 12 rebounds and 3 blocked shots per game. He helped team post 21–6 record in his only season at Christian Faith Academy.

== College ==
Thomas signed a Letter of Intent to play with the University of Iowa basketball team, but failed to meet admission standards. Thomas' freshman and sophomore years were spent as a key player for Southeastern Community College in Burlington, Iowa. Here, he helped his team post a two-year record of 69–5 while winning back-to-back National Championships. Thomas averaged 10.1 points and 6.7 rebounds as a sophomore, starting 29 of the 31 games he played and shot 49% from the field. He led all players with 13 rebounds in national title game, a figure that ties as the sixth highest total for a championship game. As a freshman, Thomas averaged 10.5 points and 5.9 rebounds helping Southeastern post a 37–1 overall record. Thomas was temporarily suspended from the team in 2003 due to arrests for Assault Causing Injury and Drug Possession.

As a junior at University of Iowa, Doug Thomas played in 32 games, with two starts and averaged 4.6 points and 4.8 rebounds per game, shooting 52.9% from the field. He had 5 points and 9 rebounds vs. University of Cincinnati in the NCAA Tournament and 7 and a season-high 11 rebounds in win over Michigan State in Big Ten Tournament.

== Professional ==
In 2006, Thomas signed with BBC Monthey of Switzerland for the 2006–07 season. He left in May 2007. In 2007, he joined the Phoenix Suns for training camp. He was later acquired by the Iowa Energy of the NBA Development League for the 2007–08 season. He was a starter for them for 36 of their 50 games, averaging 10 points, 6 rebounds, 1 steal and 1 block, while shooting 51% from the field.

In May 2008, he joined Trotamundos de Carabobo of Venezuela. Later that year, he joined the Chicago Bulls for the 2008 NBA Summer League.

In January 2009, he signed with the Sundsvall Dragons of Sweden for the rest of the 2008–09 season. Later that year, he joined the Oklahoma City Thunder for the 2009 NBA Summer League. He later joined Abejas de Guanajuato of Mexico. He left after just two games. In December 2009, he was acquired by the Reno Bighorns for the rest of the 2009–10 season. He was re-acquired by the Bighorns for the 2010–11 season.

In 2011, he joined Kirchheim Knights of Germany. He left after just 5 games. In October 2011, he was re-acquired by the Bighorns. On December 10, 2011, he signed with the San Antonio Spurs for training camp. However, he was waived by the Spurs on December 18. He then returned to the Bighorns but later left in January 2012. That same month, he joined the Petron Blaze Boosters of the Philippine Basketball Association (PBA). In March 2012, he was acquired by the Iowa Energy.

In the summer of 2012, he joined Al Kuwait SC. He later signed with the Orange County Novastars in November 2012. In December 2012, he signed with Guaros de Lara of Venezuela for the 2013 season. In March 2013, he left Guaros de Lara after just 5 games.

In November 2013, he was acquired by the Bakersfield Jam. In 2014, he also played for North Dallas Vandals of the ABA.

In February 2015, he signed with Mississauga Power of the National Basketball League of Canada.

=== The Basketball Tournament ===
In 2017, Thomas played for The CITI Team of The Basketball Tournament. The Basketball Tournament is an annual $2 million winner-take-all tournament broadcast on ESPN.
