= Brian Oliver (basketball, born 1990) =

American basketball player

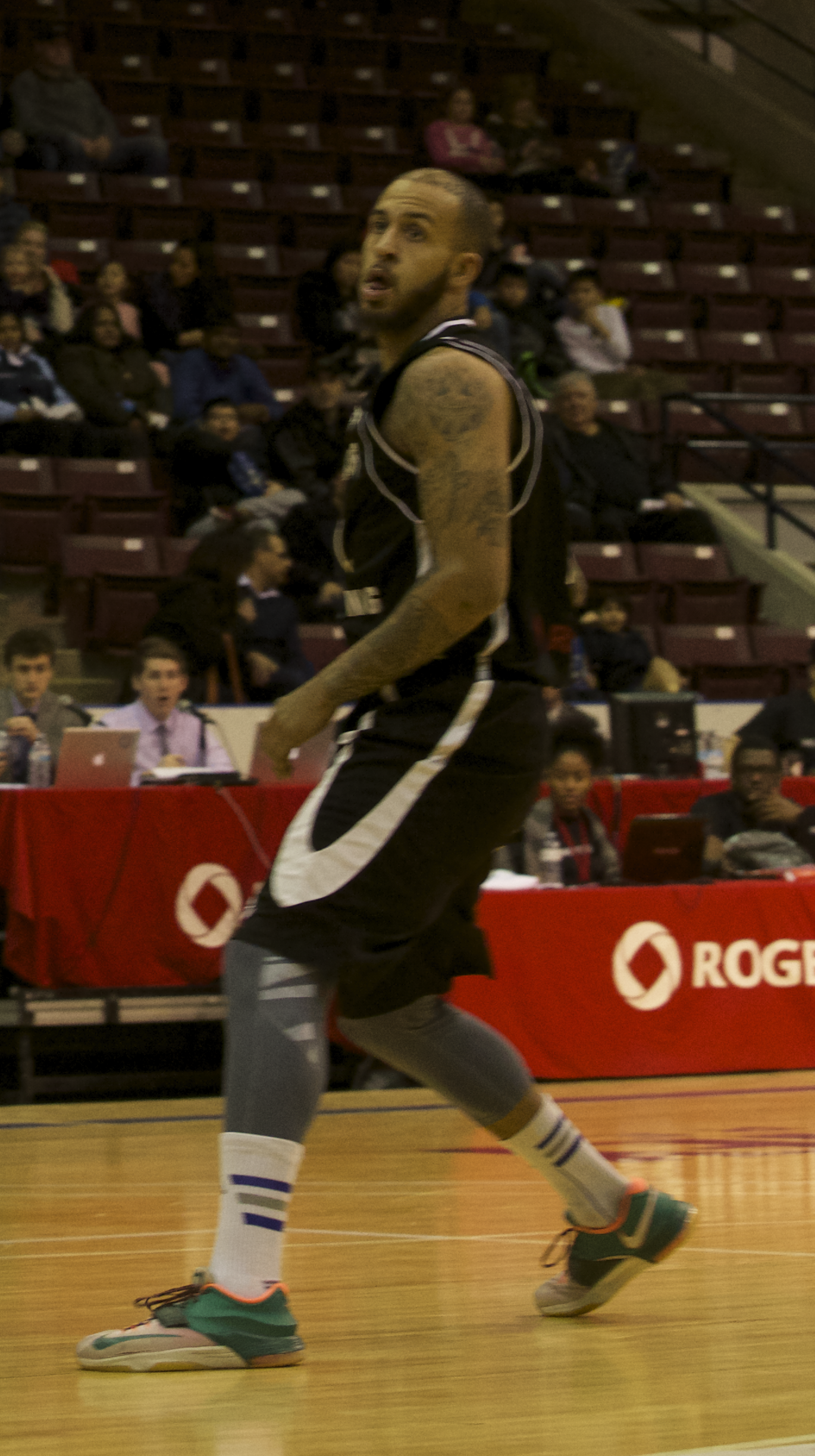
- Oliver with the Power

Personal information
- Born: September 5, 1990 (age 36) Glassboro, New Jersey
- Listed height: 6 ft 7 in (2.01 m)
- Listed weight: 225 lb (102 kg)

Career information
- High school: William Penn (New Castle, Delaware); Oak Hill Academy (Mouth of Wilson, Virginia)
- College: Georgia Tech (2009–2011); Seton Hall (2012–2014)
- NBA draft: 2014: undrafted
- Playing career: 2014–present
- Position: Small forward / shooting guard

Career history
- 2014: Brampton A's
- 2015: Mississauga Power
- 2016: ABBR - Avenir Basket Berck Rang du Fliers
- 2017: Kapfenberg Bulls
- 2018: Artland Dragons

Brian Daniel Oliver (born September 5, 1990) is an American professional basketball player who last played for the Kapfenberg Bulls of the Österreichische Basketball Bundesliga, the highest Austrian professional basketball league. He played college basketball for Georgia Tech and Seton Hall University.

== High school career ==
Oliver attended William Penn High School in New Castle, Delaware for two and a half years before he transferred to Oak Hill Academy in Mouth of Wilson, Virginia in January 2008. After half a year at Oak Hill, he returned to William Penn for his senior year.

As a freshman at William Penn in 2005–06, Oliver averaged 10 points and seven rebounds per game and went on to average 16.5 points and seven rebounds per game as a sophomore in 2006–07. He was a third-team all-state choice and conference MVP in 2006–07 as he led his team to a 19–6 record.

In January 2008, Oliver transferred to Oak Hill Academy after averaging 16.5 points, nine rebounds and 4.5 assists in six games for Williams Penn. He played for Oak Hill between January and May 2008, finishing off his junior year there before transferring back to Williams Penn for his senior year.

On November 19, 2008, Oliver signed a National Letter of Intent to play college basketball for Georgia Tech. He went on to average 14.9 points, 10.4 rebounds, 4.1 blocks and 3.7 assists per game in 2008–09 as he led his team to a state title and earned all-state honors. He finished his career with 1,101 points, which ranks in the top 10 all-time at William Penn.

== College career ==
In his freshman season at Georgia Tech, Oliver appeared in all 36 games and made five starts as he led the team in three-pointers attempted and made (63-for-166), shooting 38.0% from three-point range. He averaged 7.1 points and 1.9 rebounds per game on the season.

In his sophomore season, Oliver was injury-riddled as he managed just 22 games and 12 starts. In November 2010, he earned All-Tournament honors after his great performance during the Legends Classic in Atlantic City. On February 5, 2011, he sustained a broken left thumb which required surgery and he subsequently missed the last eight regular season games. He averaged 10.5 points, 4.5 rebounds and 1.5 assists per game on the season.

On July 7, 2011, Oliver transferred to Seton Hall University and subsequently sat out the 2011–12 season due to NCAA transfer regulations.

In his redshirted junior season at Seton Hall, Oliver played 26 games with 12 starting assignments as he averaged 7.7 points, 3.7 rebounds and 1.0 assists per game. He also recorded 42 three-pointers.

In his senior season, Oliver played 32 games with 20 starting assignments as he averaged 10.4 points, 3.5 rebounds and 1.0 assists per game. He also recorded a career high 85 three-pointers on the season.

== College statistics ==
Year	Team	GP	GS	MPG	FG%	3P%	FT%	RPG	APG	SPG	BPG	PPG
2009–10	Georgia Tech	36	5	16.5	.394	.380	.704	1.9	.9	.3	.3	7.1
2010–11	Georgia Tech	22	12	28.0	.360	.286	.846	4.5	1.5	.6	.3	10.5
2012–13	Seton Hall	26	12	23.9	.350	.350	.905	3.7	1.0	.6	.3	7.73
2013–14	Seton Hall	32	20	26.7	.400	.415	.800	3.5	1.0	.9	.3	10.4

== Professional career ==
Oliver went undrafted in the 2014 NBA draft. On August 19, 2014, he signed with KK Kumanovo of Macedonia for the 2014–15 season. He later left before appearing in a game for them. On November 1, 2014, he was selected by the Reno Bighorns in the fourth round of the 2014 NBA D-League draft. However, he was later waived by the Bighorns on November 13, 2014. On November 21, 2014, he signed with Brampton A's of Canada. Early in 2015, Brian signed and played out the rest of the season for Mississauga Power of the National Basketball League of Canada (NBL). In September 2016, he signed with ABBR - Avenir Basket Berck Rang du Fliers of Berck-Sur-Mer, Nord-Pas-De-Calais, France. The team went on to win the 2017 Coupe De France Championship. In August 2017, he signed with the Kapfenberg Bulls of the Austrian Basketball League. The team won the 2018 Austrian Cup (Cupseiger) and the 2018 Austrian Basketball Championship (Meister).

== The Basketball Tournament ==
Brian Oliver played for the Tim Thomas Playaz in the 2018 edition of The Basketball Tournament. He had 2 rebounds and a block but did not score in the team's first-round loss to Team Arkansas.
