= 2011 NBL Canada draft =

On August 21, 2011, NBL Canada held its draft at the Rogers Centre in Toronto. The first round was a free agent draft with no limits, while the second and third rounds required Canadian players be selected. The Halifax Rainmen's third round draft pick has since been voided due to the paperwork of Jerrell Thompson being mixed up to appear as that of a Canadian, he will be entered as a free agent in the next draft picks.

== Draft ==
PG	Point guard	SG	Shooting guard	SF	Small forward	PF	Power forward	C	Center

Round	Pick	Player	Position	Nationality	Team	School/club team
1	1	Morgan Lewis	SG	United States	Oshawa Power	Findlay
1	2	Justin Garris	F	United States	Summerside Storm	Ashland
1	3	Tyrone Levett	SF	United States	London Lightning	Alabama State
1	4	Darrell Wonge	F	United States	Moncton Miracles	Winston-Salem State
1	5	Jerome Brown	PG	Canada	Saint John Mill Rats	Panola
1	6	Danny Friend	F	United States	Halifax Rainmen	Limestone
1	7	Tristan Martin	SG	Canada	Quebec Kebs	Houston
2	8	Kevin Francis	F	Canada	Oshawa Power	Cleveland State
2	9	Chris Cayole	F	Canada	Summerside Storm	St. Michael's
2	10	Isaac Kuon	F	Canada	London Lightning	Windsor
2	11	Kevin Loiselle	F	Canada	Moncton Miracles	Maine-Fort Kent
2	12	Sherton Sanderson	G	Canada	Saint John Mill Rats	Markham District High School
2	13	Papa Oppong	G	Canada	Halifax Rainmen	Eastern Kentucky
2	14	Sherone Edwards	PF	Canada	Quebec Kebs	Prince Edward Island
3	15	Blain Labranche	G	Canada	Oshawa Power	British Columbia
3	16	Tyrone Mattison	G	Canada	Summerside Storm	Long Island
3	17	Nick Lother	PG	Canada	London Lightning	Winnipeg
3	18	Akeem Sween	G	Canada	Moncton Miracles	Humber
3	19	Kevin Massiah	F	Canada	Saint John Mill Rats	Milwaukee
3	20	Jerrell Thompson	G	United States	Halifax Rainmen	Sacred Heart
3	21	Eugene Kotorabai	F	Canada	Quebec Kebs	Long Island
