= Tut Ruach =

Canadian basketball player (born 1985)

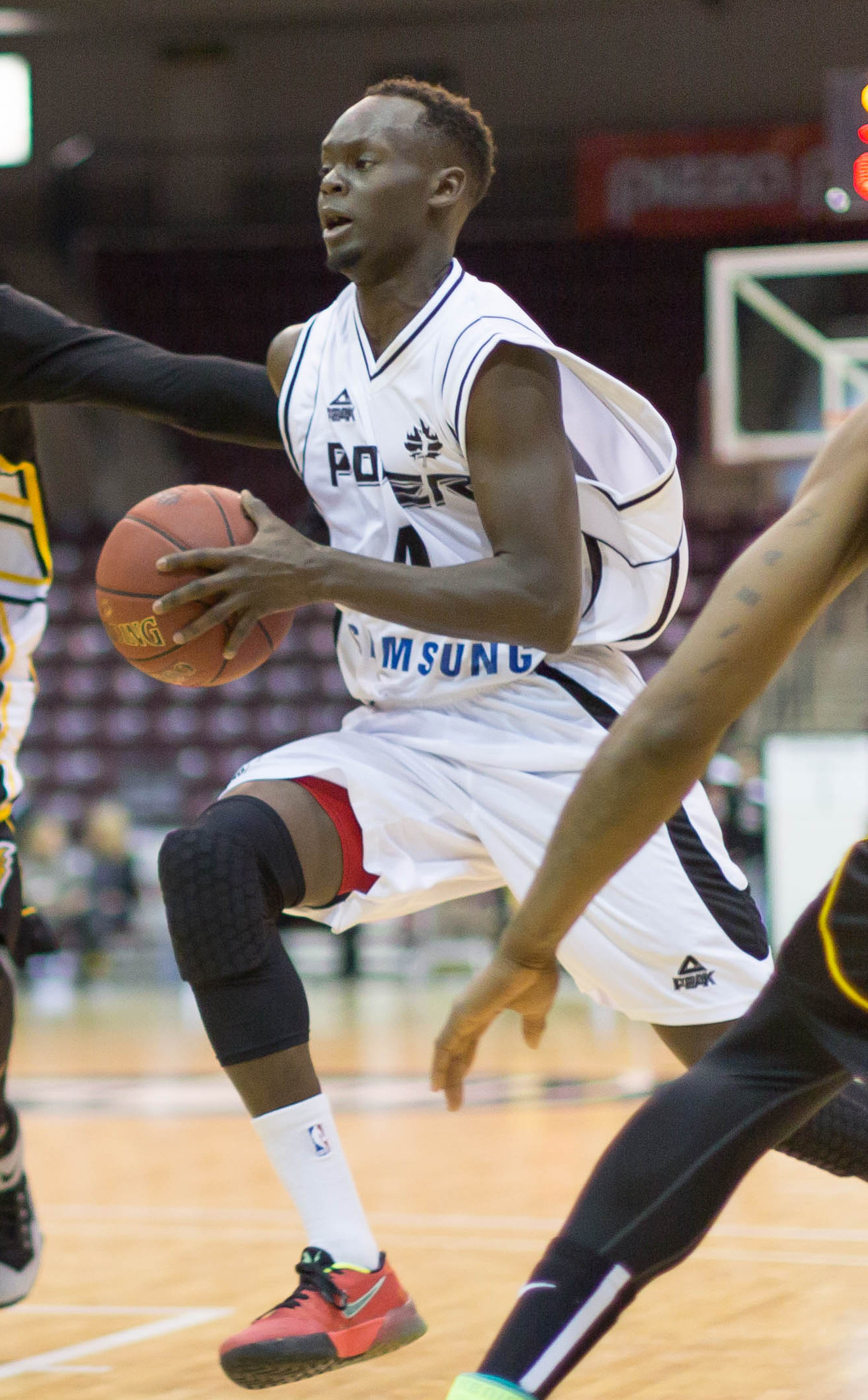
- Ruach in February of 2015

Personal information
- Born: April 30, 1985 (age 40) Halifax, Nova Scotia, Canada
- Listed height: 6 ft 2 in (1.88 m)
- Listed weight: 176 lb (80 kg)

Career information
- High school: Goetz (Mississauga)
- College: York (2005–2009)
- NBA draft: 2009: undrafted
- Playing career: 2009–2015
- Position: Point guard

Career history
- 2010–2011: Itzehoe Eagles
- 2011–2012: Oshawa Power
- 2012–2013: Nässjö
- 2013–2014: NH Ostrava
- 2014–2015: Mississauga Power

Career highlights
- NBL Canada All-Star (2012)

Tut Ruach (born April 30, 1985) is a Canadian former basketball player. Starting his professional career in 2009, he was named NBL Canada All-Star in 2012. Ruach played college basketball for York University and competed for Father Michael Goetz Secondary School in his previous seasons. He left York as its all-time leading scorer.

== Professional career ==
On March 13, 2015, Ruach broke the NBL Canada single-game record for most points, recording 48 in a postseason meeting with the Windsor Express.

== Personal life ==
His family was originally from South Sudan.
