= BioSteel Sports Nutrition =

Canadian company producing sports dietary products

BioSteel Sports Nutrition Inc.
- Type: Private
- Industry: Sports dietary supplements
- Founded: 2009 in Toronto, Ontario, Canada
- Headquarters: Tecumseh, Ontario, Canada
- Products: beverages, whey protein
- Owner: DC Holdings LTD, Dan Crosby
- Website: biosteel.ca

BioSteel Sports Nutrition Inc. is a Canadian company based in Tecumseh, Ontario that produces dietary supplement products for athletes and exercise enthusiasts.

== History ==
Officially founded in 2009 by Matt Nichol, John Celenza and former professional ice hockey player Mike Cammalleri, BioSteel sports drink was originally sold to professional teams and franchises.

In 2010, Gary Roberts reported that ice hockey players were drinking BioSteel during a Hockey Night in Canada playoff broadcast which led to BioSteel's expansion of their distribution to general consumers. BioSteel is distributed through grocery stores and retail channels across Canada.

In October 2019, Canopy Growth, a Canadian cannabis producer, acquired a 72% stake in BioSteel, with plans to introduce cannabidiol-infused BioSteel products to the market.

BioSteel agreed to a multiyear partnership for sports drinks with the National Hockey League (NHL) and National Hockey League Players' Association (NHLPA) in 2022.

On September 14, 2023, BioSteel Sports filed for Creditor Protection under the CCAA. On September 17, 2023, BioSteel Sports filed for Chapter 15 bankruptcy in Texas.

In November 2023, Canopy Growth sold BioSteel to DC Holdings Ltd., which does business as Coachwood Group of Companies, BioSteel's operational part of the business, including intellectual property of the BioSteel brand name in the U.S., Canada, and worldwide. DC is a holding company owned by Windsor-based entrepreneur Dan Crosby, who owns various businesses in southwestern Ontario, including Coachwood Capital and sports nutrition company Canadian Protein.

The remainder of BioSteel's assets, specifically their Virginia-based U.S. manufacturing facilities, were sold to New Jersey-based Gregory Packaging Inc., which makes SunCup juice and snack cartons.

== Hockey camp ==
BioSteel holds an annual hockey training session of NHL players in Toronto, which lasts four days in late August. Matt Nichol and Gary Roberts, former NHL player, partnered to create a super camp for Toronto-area hockey players. The event, created and organized by BioSteel, is an annual training session before traditional NHL training camps begin. Known as "#Camp," the event takes place at St. Michael's College School Arena. By its second year in 2011, there were 20 NHL players and 16 top prospects in attendance.

== All-Canadian basketball game ==
In 2015, BioSteel and the Athlete Institute launched the high school BioSteel All-Canadian Basketball Game. The competition featured a dunk contest and a three-point contest at Orangeville, Ontario's Athlete Institute, and an all-star game at Ryerson University's Mattamy Centre. The top 24 high schoolers from across Canada took part in the event.

== Commercial partners ==
BioSteel was used by 28 NHL franchises, 14 NBA organizations, 18 MLB teams, and numerous golfers.

BioSteel announced an official partnership with the Toronto Raptors in 2015. The Raptors training facility opened in February 2016 and was named BioSteel Centre until 2018.
