= Mississauga Power =

Former basketball team in Mississauga, Canada

- Leagues: NBL Canada
- Founded: 2011
- Folded: 2015
- History: Oshawa Power (2011–2013); Mississauga Power (2013–2015)
- Arena: General Motors Centre (2011–2013); Hershey Centre (2013–2015)
- Capacity: 5,400 (basketball configuration)
- Location: Mississauga, Ontario, Canada
- Team colours: Black, White
Home	Away

The Mississauga Power were a Canadian professional basketball team based in Mississauga, Ontario, that competed in the National Basketball League of Canada (NBL). Established in 2011 as the Oshawa Power, they played in the Central Division. The Oshawa team began play in the inaugural NBL Canada season, along with the London Lightning, Moncton Miracles, and Summerside Storm and three Premier Basketball League (PBL) teams.

The Power were relatively unsuccessful in their four years of existence. They had a losing record every season and a combined record of 17–55 since relocating to Mississauga. The team also had six different coaches during the span. In 2012, Oshawa's Brandon Robinson led the league in scoring and was named Rookie of the Year. Point guard Omar Strong became the team's all-time leader in three-point field goals, passing former All-NBL Canada selection Nick Okorie, and won the Sixth Man of the Year Award.

In June 2015, it was announced that the Power franchise was sold to the Toronto Raptors to create the Raptors 905, the Raptors' NBA Development League affiliate. The D-League team would play their home games at the Power's arena, the Hershey Centre.

== Team history ==
=== Beginnings in Oshawa (2011–2013) ===
The franchise was established in 2011 as the Oshawa Power, and they played their first season in the National Basketball League of Canada. Following the league's additions of the Halifax Rainmen, Saint John Mill Rats, and Quebec Kebs in May 2011, they joined that summer with the London Lightning, Moncton Miracles, and Summerside Storm.

In a release from the team, they said they chose their nickname because it "epitomizes the force of a community coming together as one." Before the start of the 2011–12 NBL Canada season, the Power named former NBA player Mark Strickland their head coach. The decision to add Strickland was viewed as a big step forward by President of Basketball Operations Gary Durrant.

The team decided to select Morgan Lewis with the first overall pick in the 2011 NBL Canada draft. Lewis also became the first player to be drafted in NBLC history. Along with University of Findlay's star, the Power picked up Blain LaBranche and Kevin Francis that same night. LaBranche, who played for the UBC Thunderbirds in college, was known as a strong three-point shooter, while Cleveland State's Francis was noted for his size and attitude.

In mid-October, Oshawa held two intra-squad games in Pickering High School and G L Roberts Collegiate and Vocational Institute in Ontario. Their official 18-man training camp roster featured players the caliber of Lewis, Brandon Robinson, Tut Ruach, Denham Brown, and Omari Johnson. Gary Durrant said, "We are very pleased with the guys we have on our training camp roster. I can't wait for everyone to see how entertaining and dynamic our guys are. Be prepared to be amazed by the Power." However, before the season began, Brown signed with Ciclista Olímpico of the Liga Nacional de Básquet in Argentina. Durrant called him a "role model to younger players." On October 30, 2011, the Power made their first-ever appearance in an official NBLC game, losing to the Quebec Kebs, 101–104, at the Colisée de Laval in Laval, Quebec. Brandon Robinson led Oshawa with 16 points and Tut Ruach added 10 assists, but they were overwhelmed by Tommy Mitchell and Royce Parran. This was the first regular season game in the history of the NBL Canada as well. Oshawa started strong in their home opener at the General Motors Centre against the Moncton Miracles in their following game, capturing a 107–80 victory.

Strickland parted ways with the Power on December 21, 2011, after leading the team to a 6–11 start to the season. Durrant said, "We appreciate all that Coach Strickland has done for this organization." It was also announced that David Joseph, best known as the father of San Antonio Spurs player Cory Joseph, would assume the role until an interim head coach was named. Joseph assisted Jim Barclay at Centennial College in Toronto and therefore was not capable of taking up the full-time job. After having Joseph coach two games, both of which were defeats, Oshawa introduced former Duke Blue Devils captain Robert Brickey as their head coach for the remainder of the season. Before long under their new sideline leader, on January 4, 2012, leading scorer Akeem Wright was traded away to the Moncton Miracles in exchange for forward Andrew Francis. Brickey would help the Power finish off the season a relatively pleasant 9–10 and engineered a 4-game winning streak during his term, but his team ultimately finished fifth in the league at 15–21. In the 2011–12 season, where only four teams could qualify for the postseason, they failed to make the playoffs. Nevertheless, Brandon Robinson led the league in points per game for that season.

=== Relocation to Mississauga (2013–2015) ===
In April 2013, an official announcement was made that the Power would relocate to Mississauga for the 2013–14 NBL Canada season.

== Home arenas ==
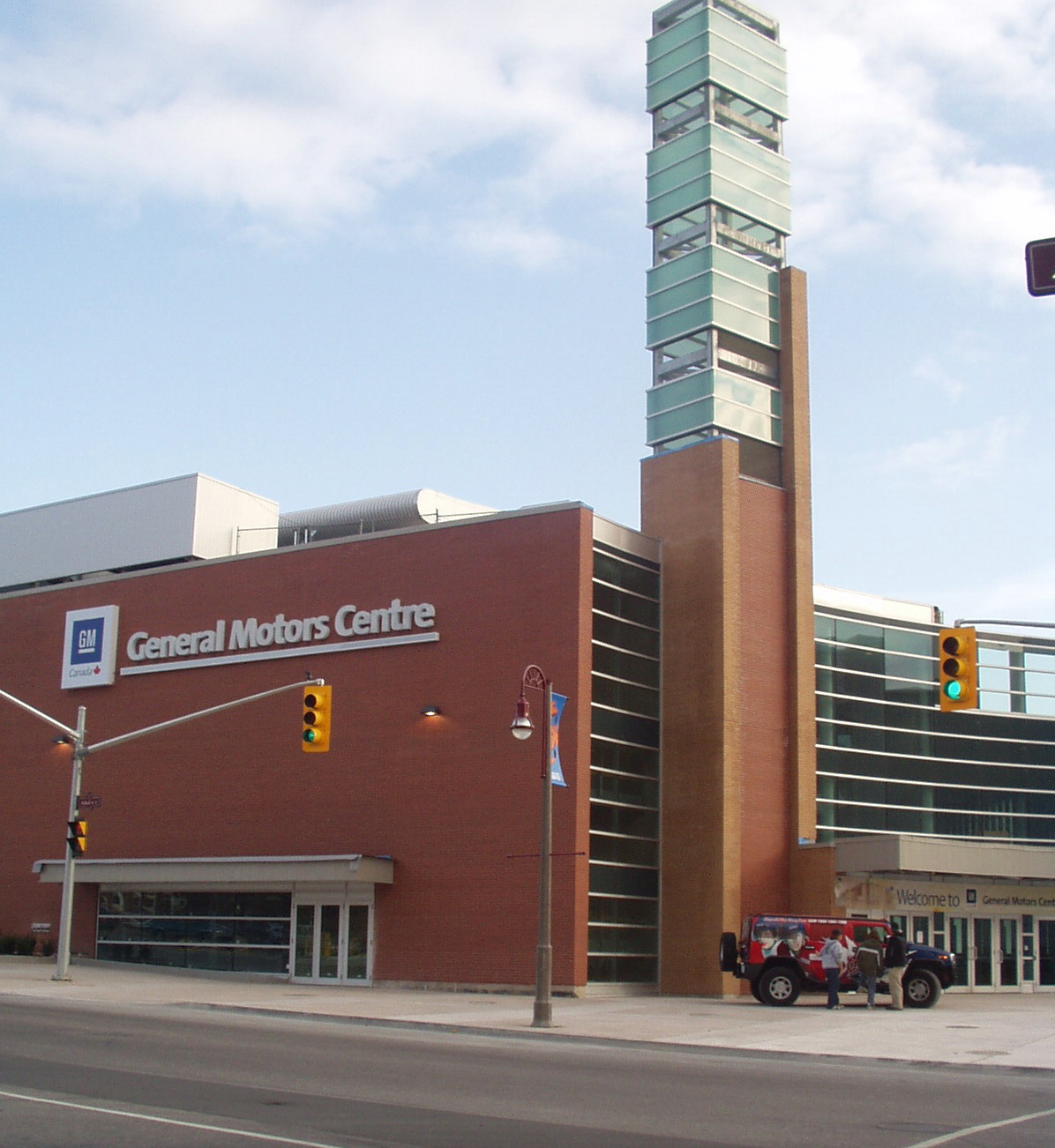
GM Centre, home of the Power from 2011 to 2013.

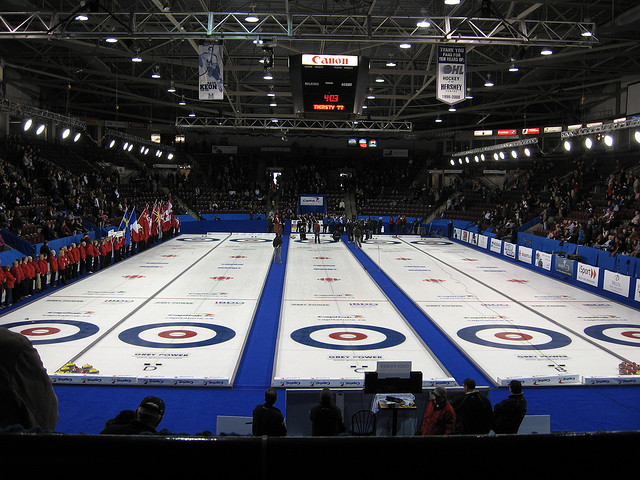
Hershey Centre, home of the Power from 2013 to 2015.

The Power played their home games at the Hershey Centre, located in Mississauga, Ontario. The stadium, which opened in October 1998, is known as one of the best sports and entertainment facilities in the Greater Toronto Area and features a portable FIBA-size basketball court. The Hershey Centre is also the home to the Mississauga Steelheads of the Ontario Hockey League as well as many other teams. It hosted wrestling, judo, taekwondo, and karate at the 2015 Pan American Games and goalball, powerlifting, and wheelchair rugby events at the 2015 Parapan American Games.

Before moving to Mississauga, when the Power were based in Oshawa, their home stadium was the General Motors Centre. The GM Centre is known to be home of the Oshawa Generals in the Ontario Hockey League. Opened in 2006, it is a multi-purpose arena that has previously hosted Elton John concerts and Cirque du Soleil performances. It can hold up to 7,600 visitors and has special club seating. As a sports stadium, it has hosted events such as the 2011 BDO Canadian Open of Curling, the IIHF World Junior Pre-Competition, and the Canadian Synchronized Skating Championships.

== Sponsorship ==
On October 2, 2014, the Mississauga Power secured significant corporate support by announcing their partnership with BioSteel Sports Supplements Inc & Peak Sports Canada.

This the second significant sponsorship announcement in the basketball market for BioSteel Sports Supplements Inc. Earlier in the summer BioSteel Sports Supplements Inc became the exclusive sports drink provider for Canada Basketball.

== Mascot ==
The Mississauga Power's official mascot was "POW", who participated in various community and city events such as the Toronto Auto Show.

== Players ==
=== Final roster ===
Note: Flags indicate national team eligibility at FIBA-sanctioned events. Players may hold other non-FIBA nationalities not displayed.

Mississauga Power roster
Players
Coaches

Pos.	No.	Nat.	Name	Ht.	Wt.	Age
SG	0	(Canada)	Ward, Warren (injured)	6 ft 6 in (1.98 m)	210 lb (95 kg)	36 – 16 November 1989
G	1	(Canada)	Vernon, Tyrell	6 ft 1 in (1.85 m)	200 lb (91 kg)	37 – 8 September 1988
G/F	2	(United States)	Oliver, Brian **(S)**	6 ft 7 in (2.01 m)	225 lb (102 kg)	36 – 5 September 1990
G	3	(Canada)	Newby, Jabs	6 ft 2 in (1.88 m)	195 lb (88 kg)	35 – 15 August 1991
PG	4	(Canada)	Ruach, Tut	6 ft 1 in (1.85 m)	175 lb (79 kg)	41 – 30 April 1985
PG	5	(United States)	Strong, Omar	5 ft 9 in (1.75 m)	162 lb (73 kg)	36 – 16 May 1990
PG	9	(United States)	Garland, Tyrone	6 ft 1 in (1.85 m)	185 lb (84 kg)
G	10	(United States)	Capers, Marcus	6 ft 4 in (1.93 m)	190 lb (86 kg)	36 – 21 December 1989
C	20	(United States)	Thomas, Doug (injured)	6 ft 9 in (2.06 m)	245 lb (111 kg)	42 – 20 September 1983
G	22	(United States)	Weidner, Jordan	6 ft 1 in (1.85 m)	187 lb (85 kg)
F	32	(United States)	Cooper, Paul	6 ft 9 in (2.06 m)	250 lb (110 kg)	36 – 1 February 1990
G	34	(United States)	Grant, Malcolm	6 ft 1 in (1.85 m)	190 lb (86 kg)	38 – 21 June 1988
C	44	(Canada)	Allison, Mike	6 ft 10 in (2.08 m)	220 lb (100 kg)	36 – 4 August 1990

Head coach

- (Canada) Kyle Julius

Assistant coach(es)

- (Canada) Jeremie Kayeye
- (Canada) Kin Chan

Legend

- **(C)** Team captain
- Injured

- Roster
Updated: May 23, 2015

=== Draft picks ===
The Power have had two first overall draft picks in franchise history: Morgan Lewis (selected in 2011) and Jordan Weidner (selected in 2014). Both draftees hailed from the United States, but neither of them played college basketball at the Division I level. Some of the other players Oshawa and Mississauga have drafted in the past include Anthony Petteway and Freddie Riley in 2014, Bol Kong, Dwight McCombs, and Eric Petty Jr. in 2013, Chad Gillaspy, Amani Daanish, and Jamaal Smith in 2012, and Kevin Francis and Blain Labranche in 2011.

=== Franchise leaders ===
Bold denotes still active with team.

Statistics (regular season) as of the end of the 2014–15 season

Points

1. Nick Okorie (1,171)
2. Morgan Lewis (1,049)
3. Bo Harris (899)
4. Jushay Rockett (866)
5. Kirk Williams (791)

Rebounds

1. Jushay Rockett (523)
2. Morgan Lewis (452)
3. Bo Harris (394)
4. Omari Johnson (310)
5. Kirk Williams (290)

Assists

1. Alex Johnson (293)
2. Nick Okorie (253)
3. Bo Harris (247)
4. Morgan Lewis (224)
5. **Tut Ruach** (201)

Steals

1. Morgan Lewis (99)
2. Jushay Rockett (93)
3. Bo Harris (91)
4. Nick Okorie (85)
5. Papa Oppong (65)

Blocks

1. Omari Johnson (57)
2. Shamus Ferguson (47)
3. Jushay Rockett (42)
4. Bo Harris (39)
5. Dwight McCombs (39)

=== Individual awards ===
NBL Rookie of the Year

- Brandon Robinson – 2012

NBL Sixth Man of the Year

- Omar Strong – 2015

All-NBL Second Team

- Omari Johnson – 2012
- Brandon Robinson – 2012
- Omar Strong – 2015

All-NBL Third Team

- Nick Okorie – 2013, 2014

NBL All-Defence Team

- Marcus Capers – 2015

NBL All-Rookie Team

- Thijin Moses – 2014

=== All-Stars ===
Nationality	Name	Season
USA	Morgan Lewis	2011–2012
USA	Omari Johnson	2011–2012
USA	Brandon Robinson	2011–2012
USA	Nick Okorie	2012–2013
CAN	Papa Oppong	2012–2013
USA	Morgan Lewis	2013–2014
CAN	Alex Johnson	2013–2014

== Head coaches ==
No.	Name	Years	Games	Won	Lost	Win %
1	Mark Strickland	2011	17	6	11	.353
2	David Joseph	2011, 2013–2014	36	8	28	.222
3	Robert Brickey	2011–2012	19	9	10	.474
4	Larry Blunt	2012–2013	40	18	22	.450
5	Fred Grannum	2013	6	2	4	.333
6	Kyle Julius	2014–2015	32	7	25	.219
4-year Total		2011–2015	150	50	100	.333
