= Kyle Julius =

Canadian basketball player and coach

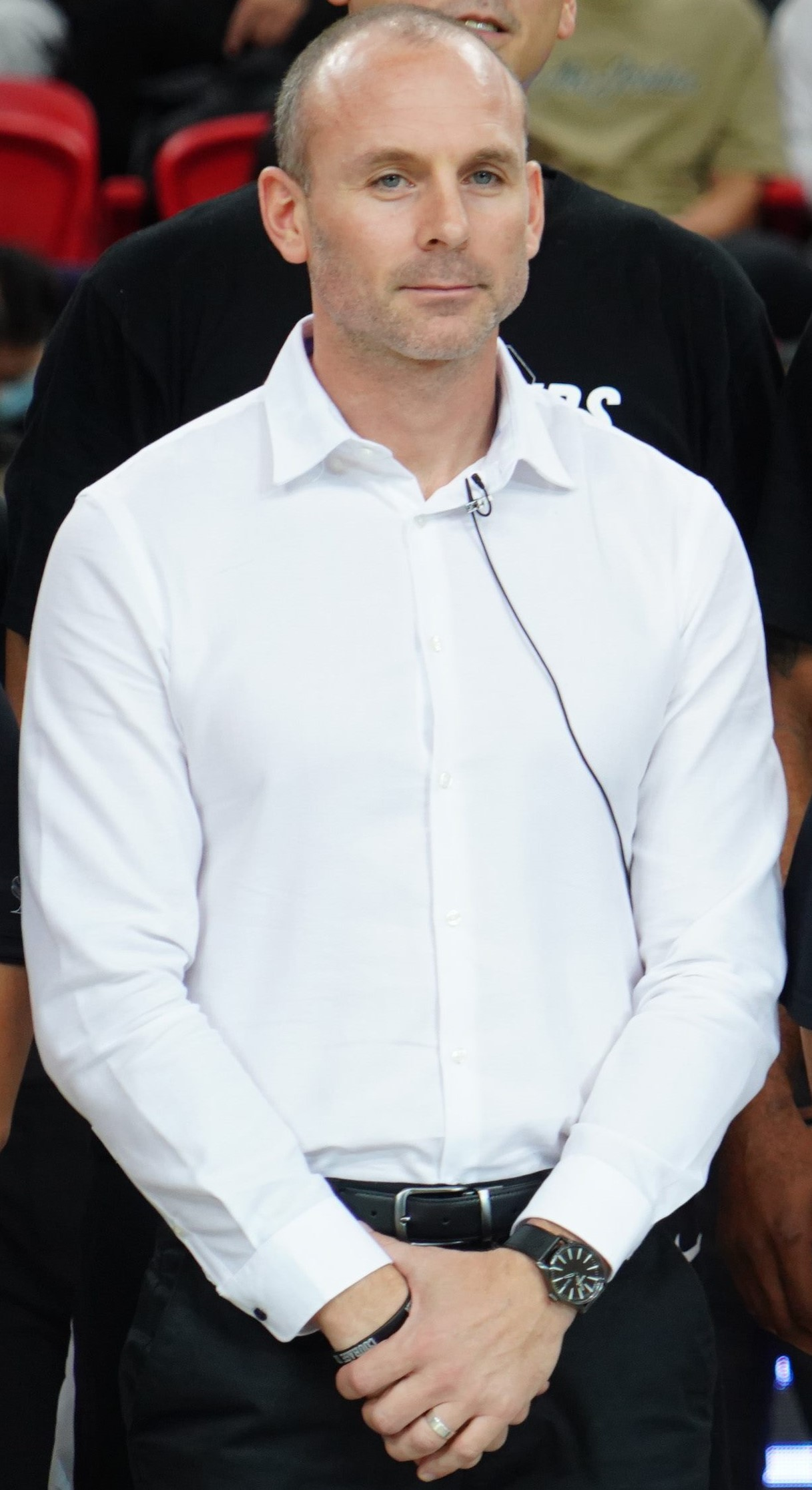

Tianjin Pioneers
- Position: Head coach
- League: CBA

Personal information
- Born: June 20, 1979 (age 47) Thunder Bay, Ontario, Canada
- Listed height: 6 ft 3 in (1.91 m)

Career information
- High school: Hammerskjold (Thunder Bay, Ontario); Cathedral (Hamilton, Ontario)
- College: Furman (1998–2000); Guelph (2001–2004)

Career history

Playing
- 2004: Guelph Gladiators
- 2004-2005: Cari Fabriano
- 2004-2005: Euro Roseto
- 2005-2006: Pizza Express Apollon Limassol
- 2006-2007: Viola Reggio Calabria
- 2011-2012: London Lightning

Coaching
- 2007-2008: Wilfrid Laurier Women's (assistant)
- 2014–2015: Mississauga Power
- 2015–2017: London Lightning
- 2017–2019: Saigon Heat
- 2020: Fraser Valley Bandits
- 2019–2023: Formosa Taishin Dreamers
- 2023–2026: Vancouver Bandits
- 2026–present: Tianjin Pioneers

Career highlights
- 2× CEBL Coach of the Year (2024, 2025); NBL Canada Coach of the Year (2017); NBL Canada Champion (2017); CIS Second Team All-Canadian (2004); OUA West First Team All-Star (2004); CIS Final 8 All-Star (2003)

Kyle Nicholas Julius (born June 20, 1979) is a Canadian professional basketball coach and former player who is the head coach for the Tianjin Pioneers of the Chinese Basketball Association (CBA).

He previously served as the General Manager and head coach for the Vancouver Bandits of the Canadian Elite Basketball League (CEBL) and the Taiwanese team Formosa Taishin Dreamers of the ASEAN Basketball League and the P. League+.

A former Canadian men's national team player, he has been considered one of Canada's most experienced and talented basketball minds. He shares training tips and basketball experience through short articles published on NorthPoleHoops.

== Early life and career ==
Julius was born on June 20, 1979, and brought up in Thunder Bay, Ontario. He grew up playing ice hockey, a very popular sport in the area. However, his interest in basketball grew, and in Grade 8, he began training with Lakehead University's star point guard John LaPlante. He often did two-a-days under LaPlante's direction and was inspired by his work ethic. In Grades 9 and 10, Julius began training frequently with the Lakehead basketball team. He got into fights on numerous occasions. In his senior season of high school basketball, Julius played with Cathedral High School in Hamilton, Ontario. The team finished the year with an undefeated record, and he helped them win the Ontario Federation of School Athletic Associations (OFSAA) AAA title in 1998 under coach Mark Walton. Julius averaged 14.0 points for the Gaels that season, shooting.500 on field goals and.480 from beyond the arc.

Julius did not have access to an Amateur Athletic Union (AAU) basketball team in Thunder Bay. However, he constantly received advice from his father, Stu Julius, who coached college basketball in the area. Stu would often examine film and study the game with his sons. Kyle said that it became a part of his everyday life, and a majority of his conversations with his father concerned the game of basketball. He wrote on North Pole Hoops, "My dad opened the gym and my mom pushed me, basketball was our foundation and the game was my life."

== Collegiate career ==
On April 10, 1998, Julius signed a National Letter of Intent to play with the Furman Paladins men's basketball team, which played at the NCAA Division I level. Paladins head coach Larry Davis approached Julius primarily because of his ability as a three-point shooter. Davis commented on Julius, "He is an outstanding shooter who has excellent overall guard skills and a tremendous worth ethic, and he has played in one of the best high school programs in North America with a perennial winning tradition." Julius became Furman's fifth recruit for the team's 1998–99 season. He later considered it one of his favorite moments of his entire career. Julius made his first appearance on the collegiate stage on November 14, 1998, against Stetson, helping the Paladins win the game, 66–59.

Julius was named to the NCAA SOCON All Rookie team, a major accomplishment for a freshman from Canada at that time.

Julius returned to Canada to play for the University of Guelph Gryphons for three OUA seasons from 2001–02 to 2003–04. He was a tournament all-star in 2003 when Guelph finished second in the national championship event in Halifax and he was a second-team All-Canadian, fourth in the country in scoring average (21.23 points per game) and the University of Guelph's male athlete of the year in his final season with the Gryphons.

== Professional career ==
Julius began his professional career in 2004 with the Guelph Gladiators in the short-lived Ontario Professional Basketball Association (OPBA). In 2004, Julius joined the Italian club Euro Roseto before moving to Cari Fabriano mid-season. In January 2006, he moved to Cypriot club Pizza Express Apollon Limassol. In September 2007, he signed with Viola Reggio Calabria. In February 2012, Julius played for the London Lightning in his final professional season.

== Coaching career ==
=== Wilfrid Laurier ===
Julius served as an assistant coach for the Wilfrid Laurier Golden Hawks women's basketball team during the 2007-2008 season.

=== Mississauga Power ===
On August 18, 2014, the Mississauga Power of the National Basketball League of Canada (NBL) officially announced the hiring of Julius as their new head coach.

Julius lead the Power through a challenging season of injuries, discipline and personnel changes. They won their first ever playoff game and lost the series in the first round to the eventual league Champion Windsor Express.

In the offseason, the Power was bought by the Raptors 905 G-League Team NBA Development League team, Raptors 905.

Julius talking about Canadian Development with the Power

=== London Lightning ===
2016–2017 National Basketball League of Canada Champion

• NBLC Coach of the Year

• Best Record in League History 46–7 Central Division Champs

• Central Division Champions

2015–2016 NBLC Runner Up

• League record 36–20 • Central Division Champions

Julius hired as Lightning Coach

On August 19, 2015, it was announced that Julius would be the third head coach for the London Lightning of the NBL Canada. He returned to the team after playing two games for them in 2011. Julius said, "London is an amazing city with some of the best sports fans in the country. I can't wait to get started and pour my soul into making the city and organization proud."

Julius led the London Lightning to the championship in his second season. He built the most successful team in the history of the league in only his third year coaching.

Julius spent two seasons with the Lightning, taking them to the league finals both years.

In 2015 the Lightning lost to Halifax in seven games. The next season, London defeated Halifax in six games.

Julius orchestrated two of the best years of the London Lightning, with an overall 61–19 regular season record and a 21–8 mark in the playoffs.

In the 2016–17 season, London set the league record for most wins in a single season with 35. During the playoffs in 2017, Julius informed team owner Vito Frijia that he would be leaving the Lightning after the playoffs concluded.

Julius wins Championship

=== Saigon Heat ===
In August 2017, Julius was signed by Saigon Heat of the ASEAN Basketball League (ABL), replacing British coach Tony Garbelotto..

During the 2018-2019 season, Julius became the winningest coach in franchise history with 24 wins. He also achieving the franchise's first winning record (14–12), set the record for most regular-season wins, and earned its first playoff victory.

=== Vancouver Bandits ===
On December 5, 2019, the Vancouver Bandits of the Canadian Elite Basketball League (CEBL) officially announced the hiring of Julius as their new head coach and general manager.

During the 2020 CEBL season, Julius led the Bandits to a regular season record of 4-2 and advanced to the CEBL championship game. They ultimately fell to the Edmonton Stingers in the final 90–73.

The Bandits re-signed Julius to a contract extension on May 19, 2023, followed by a further extension October 23, 2024.

On June 20th, 2026, Julius was indefinitely suspended by the CEBL for an interaction with a fan on June 18th. On June 24th, 2026 the suspension was reduced to three games.

On July 5, 2026, Julius stepped down as the Bandits head coach midway through the 2026 CEBL season in order take a head coaching job in the Chinese Basketball Association, ending his tenure with the club.

=== Tianjin Pioneers ===
On July 11, 2026, Julius was announced as head coach of the Tianjin Pioneers of the Chinese Basketball Association.

=== International ===
Kyle Julius was the new Team Canada Head Coach for 3D Global Sports Canada at the 39th William Jones Cup, held annually in Taipei City, Taiwan, since 1977. Summer 2017 William Jones Cup Champion Gold • 8–1 Kyle Julius William Jones Cup Championship Recap - Behind the Scenes

== Personal life ==
Julius is a well-known figure in the Canadian basketball community. He is the founder of A-Game Hoops, which is a highly successful off season, in season and post season basketball training system.

Julius has developed a reputation as one of Canada's best basketball skill and development instructors. He has developed over 50 Canadian high school players who went on to earn NCAA DI scholarships. He has trained over 100 professional players, including NBA players Andrew Wiggins, Kelly Olynyk, Anthony Bennett, Kevin Pangos and Andrea Bargnani. He has helped train 67 Canadians currently playing professionally in Europe. He developed and recruited players like Royce White, who won a NBL-Canada Championship with the London Lightning.

Julius is also the head coach for A-Game Hoops' Men's Developmental Team, which he has coached to 55–11 since 2007.

== Accomplishments and awards ==
In 5 short years as a professional head coach, Kyle Julius has won Championships. In the process, he has set multiple league and franchise records while turning two organizations around on two separate sides of the world.

• In 2017, Kyle was hired by the Saigon Heat in the ABL in overturn the team's declining performance and help build a new winning culture. Since arriving in Vietnam, Kyle has been praised for changing the entire culture of the team, and giving the Saigon Heat's two best-performing seasons in franchise history, including their first playoff win in history.

• In Canada, Julius spent two seasons with the London Lightning, taking them to the league finals both years. In 2016 the Lightning lost to Halifax in seven games. In 2017, London defeated Halifax in six games.

• Overall, his teams compiled a 61–19 regular season record and a 21–8 mark in the playoffs. In 2017 Julius set the league record for most wins in a single season with 35 – Regular season record of 35–5.

• The former All-Canadian from the University of Guelph was also a member of the Canadian National basketball team and played professionally in Italy before returning to North America.

• He was an outstanding three-point shooter, who was recruited to play NCAA Division-1 basketball at Furman and spent two seasons with the Paladins, making the Southern Conference All-Rookie team in 1998–99. His coaching career began almost immediately following the end of his run as a player. Kyle founded A-Game Hoops, a development program that works to develop basketball players at all levels, including the NBA.
