= 2014–15 NBL Canada season =

- League: National Basketball League of Canada
- Sport: Basketball
- Duration: November 1, 2014 – February 28, 2015; March 2, 2015 – April 12, 2015 (Playoffs); April 15 – 30, 2015 (Finals)
- Games: 32
- Teams: 8
- TV partner(s): BeIN, EastLink TV, The Score, Rogers Media

Draft
- Top draft pick: Jordan Weidner
- Picked by: Mississauga Power

Regular Season
- Top seed: Windsor Express
- Season MVP: Quinnel Brown (Windsor)
- Top scorer: Quinnel Brown (Windsor)

Playoffs
- Atlantic champions: Halifax Rainmen
- Atlantic runners-up: Island Storm
- Central champions: Windsor Express
- Central runners-up: Brampton A's

Finals
- Champions: Windsor Express
- Runners-up: Halifax Rainmen
- Finals MVP: Kirk Williams

NBL Canada seasons
- ← 2013–14 2015–16 →

The 2014–15 NBL Canada season was the fourth season of the National Basketball League of Canada (NBL Canada). The NBL Canada contracted to 8 teams for 2014–15 after the ownership of the Ottawa SkyHawks were revoked by the league following the 2013–14 season.

== Offseason ==
During preseason, the NBL Canada's Board of Governors voted to revoke the ownership rights of Bytown Sports & Entertainment Inc., who operated the Ottawa SkyHawks. The league is working to find a new ownership group to bring the NBL Canada back to Ottawa, as soon as next season.

Sam Hill was appointed NBL Canada Deputy Commissioner and General Counsel

The owner of the Moncton Miracles, Kim Blanco, left the team without an owner during the off season.

Coaching changes
Offseason
Team	2013–14 season	2014–15 season
Halifax Rainmen	Craig Hodges	Josep Clarós
London Lightning	Michael Ray Richardson	Carlos Knox
Mississauga Power	David Joseph	Kyle Julius
Moncton Miracles		Serge Langis
Saint John Mill Rats	Rob Spon	Julian King
General Manager changes
Offseason
Team	2013–14 season	2014–15 season
London Lightning	Taylor Brown	Bill Smith
Moncton Miracles		Joe Salerno Sr.

=== Rule changes ===
The league will play a 32 game schedule (down from 40 in the previous two seasons) and take a break in the weeks heading up to Christmas.

The minimum number of Canadians on a team has been increased from 3 to 4.

The off season protected players list has been increased from 5 to 6.

=== Coaching changes ===
==== Offseason ====
On July 17, 2014, the London Lightning hired Carlos Knox as head coach.

=== General Manager changes ===
==== Offseason ====
On September 10, 2014, the London Lightning hired Bill Smith as general manager.

On October 1, 2014, the Moncton Miracles hired Joe Salerno Sr. as general manager.

=== Draft ===
The 2014 NBL Canada Draft took place on August 24 at the Wegz Stadium Bar in Vaughan, Ontario. 160 players competed over the weekend at the Pre-Draft Combine at the Athlete Institute in Mono, Ontario. 40 players were nominated to attend the Draft with the possibility of being selected. Following the combine, the Mississauga Power drafted Indiana Wesleyan guard Jordan Weidner with the first overall pick.

== Teams ==
2014-15 National Basketball League of Canada
Division	Team	City	Arena	Capacity
Atlantic	Halifax Rainmen	Halifax, Nova Scotia	Scotiabank Centre	10,500
Atlantic	Island Storm	Charlottetown, Prince Edward Island	Eastlink Centre	4,000
Atlantic	Moncton Miracles	Moncton, New Brunswick	Moncton Coliseum	6,554
Atlantic	Saint John Mill Rats	Saint John, New Brunswick	Harbour Station	6,603
Central	Brampton A's	Brampton, Ontario	Powerade Centre	5,000
Central	London Lightning	London, Ontario	Budweiser Gardens	9,000
Central	Mississauga Power	Mississauga, Ontario	Hershey Centre	5,400
Central	Windsor Express	Windsor, Ontario	WFCU Centre	6,500

=== Map of teams ===
Atlantic Division Central Division

== Regular season ==
The regular season began on November 1, 2014 and concluded on February 28, 2015.

=== Standings ===
#	Atlantic Division						
#	Team	W	L	PCT	GB	Div	GP
1	y- Halifax Rainmen	20	12	.625	--	15-9	32
2	x- Island Storm	19	13	.593	1	15-9	32
3	x- Saint John Mill Rats	17	15	.531	3	13-11	32
4	x- Moncton Miracles	8	24	.250	12	5-19	32

#	Central Division						
#	Team	W	L	PCT	GB	Div	GP
1	y- Windsor Express	21	11	.656	--	16-8	32
2	x- Brampton A's	18	14	.563	3	14-10	32
3	x- London Lightning	18	14	.563	3	13-11	32
4	x- Mississauga Power	7	25	.219	14	5-19	32

== Playoffs ==
Division Semifinals
1	Halifax*	3
4	Moncton	1
Atlantic Division
2	Island	3
3	Saint John	2
1	Windsor*	3
4	Mississauga	1
Central Division
2	Brampton	3
3	London	2

Division Finals
1	Halifax	4
2	Island	1
1	Windsor	4
2	Brampton	3

NBL Canada Finals
A1	Halifax	3
C1	Windsor	4

* Division winner
Bold Series winner

=== Finals ===
All times local.

=== Game 1 ===
April 15
7:00 pm

Box score

Halifax Rainmen 104, Windsor Express 113
Scoring by quarter: 22–28, 29–30, 26–22, 27–33
Pts: PJ Foster 15; Rebs: Jermaine Dailey 13; Asts: Cliff Clinkscales 3	Pts: Chris Commons 33; Rebs: Chris Commons 8 Asts: Gary Gibson 6
Windsor leads series, 1–0

WFCU Centre, Windsor, Ontario
Attendance: 1,013

April 17
7:00 pm

Box score

Halifax Rainmen 100, Windsor Express 93
Scoring by quarter: 32–19, 22–24, 25–26, 18–27
Pts: Tyrone Watson 16; Rebs: Young, Watson, Spikes, 9 each Asts: Kevin Young 5	Pts: Tony Bennett 25; Rebs: Jamarcus Ellis 8 Asts: Gary Gibson 7
Series tied, 1–1

WFCU Centre, Windsor, Ontario
Attendance: 1,503

April 23
7:00 pm

Box score

Halifax Rainmen 100, Windsor Express 70
Scoring by quarter: 24–13, 23–19, 24–17, 29–21
Pts: Kevin Young 17; Rebs: Young 12; Asts: Cliff Clinkscales 9	Pts: Kirk Williams 13; Rebs: Tim Parham 7 Asts: Chris Commons 3
Halifax leads series, 2–1

Scotiabank Centre, Halifax, Nova Scotia
Attendance: 2,417

April 24
7:00 pm

Box score

Halifax Rainmen 105, Windsor Express 109
Scoring by quarter: 22–29, 27–28, 26–28, 30–24
Pts: Chris Cayole 23; Rebs: Jermaine Dailey 10; Asts: Young, Ando 4 each	Pts: Kirk Williams 36; Rebs: Ryan Anderson 16; Asts: Anderson, Bennett 4 each
Series tied, 2–2

Scotiabank Centre, Halifax, Nova Scotia
Attendance: 2,758

April 26
2:00 pm

Box score

Halifax Rainmen 125, Windsor Express 91
Scoring by quarter: 30–25, 29–20, 25–25, 41–21
Pts: Chris Cayole 30; Rebs: Tyrone Watson 12; Asts: Tyrone Watson 5	Pts: Kirk Williams 20; Rebs: Ryan Anderson 15; Asts: Tony Bennett 6
Halifax leads series, 3–2

Scotiabank Centre, Halifax, Nova Scotia
Attendance: 2,691

April 28
7:00 pm

Box score

Halifax Rainmen 112, Windsor Express 119
Scoring by quarter: 28–32, 35–19, 22–34, 27–34
Pts: Seiya Ando 27; Rebs: Liam McMorrow 11; Asts: Ando, Clinkscales 3 each	Pts: Quinnel Brown 30; Rebs: Jamarcus Ellis 9 Asts: Tony Bennett 7
Series tied, 3–3

WFCU Centre, Windsor, Ontario
Attendance: 1,813

April 30
7:00 pm

Windsor Express 20, Halifax Rainmen 0
Forfeit

WFCU Centre, Windsor, Ontario

== Notable occurrences ==
- NBL Canada's Board of Governors voted on July 30 to remove the Ottawa SkyHawks' ownership group. The SkyHawks will not participate in the 2014-15 season.
- Sam Hill was appointed deputy commissioner and general counsel of the NBL Canada on August 7.
