= London Lightning =

Basketball team in London, Canada

- League: NBL Canada (2011-2023); BSL (2023-2025)
- Founded: 2011
- History: London Lightning; 2011–present
- Arena: Canada Life Place (2011-2025)
- Location: London, Ontario
- Team colours: Yellow, black, white
- General manager: Mark Frijia
- Head coach: Jerry Williams
- Ownership: Vito Frijia
- Championships: 7 (2012, 2013, 2017, 2018, 2022, 2023, 2024)
- Website: lightningbasketball.ca
Home	Away	Alternate

The London Lightning is an inactive Canadian professional basketball team based in London, Ontario, which played its home games at Canada Life Place. The team formerly competed in the National Basketball League of Canada and the Basketball Super League.

== History ==
The Lightning name was announced on August 12, 2011. The team was a charter member of the National Basketball League of Canada (NBL) that began play for the 2011–12 season and won the league's first championship. The Lightning have won the most NBL championships with six. On August 17, former Albany Patroons and Lawton-Fort Sill Cavalry head coach Micheal Ray Richardson was announced as the Lightning's first head coach. The Lightning would go on to win the 2012 NBL championship, defeating the Halifax Rainmen 116-92 on March 25, 2012 at the John Labatt Centre to take the best-of-five championship series three games to two.

Carlos Knox was unveiled as the new Lightning head coach on July 17, 2014. He led the team to an 18–14 record. Knox was dismissed in August 2015 after hiding player Jonathan Mills' positive drug test results from Vito Frijia and the league. He was replaced by former Mississauga Power head coach Kyle Julius later in the month.

Julius would lead the Lightning to back-to-back championship appearances in 2016 and 2017, winning the championship in the latter. He would be replaced by former Niagara College and interim Niagara River Lions head coach, Keith Vassell. Vassell led the Lightning to another championship in 2017–18, but was fired after a 4–4 record in the 2018–19 season.

After the NBL folded in 2023, the Lightning joined the new Basketball Super League (BSL) alongside some other former NBL franchises.

After struggling to draw crowds at Canada Life Place during their last several seasons and amid the team's concerns over changes to governance of the BSL, the team announced on October 3, 2025, that it would not play in the upcoming 2025-26 BSL season. Lightning general manager Mark Frijia emphasized that the decision was not necessarily permanent and that the team would "keep [its] options open for the future."

== Home arenas ==
Originally opened in 2002 as the John Labatt Centre and later Budweiser Gardens, Canada Life Place is a sports-entertainment centre in downtown London, Ontario, Canada. The arena has a capacity of 9,000. The Lightning shared the arena with London Knights of the Ontario Hockey League; their lease expired in 2025 and was not renewed due to the Lightning's absence from basketball in 2025-26.

== Personnel ==
Note: Flags indicate national team eligibility at FIBA-sanctioned events. Players may hold other non-FIBA nationalities not displayed.

London Lightning roster
Players
Coaches

Pos.	No.	Nat.	Name	Ht.	Wt.	Age
G	6	(Canada)	Binney, Marvin (injured)	6 ft 3 in (1.91 m)	195 lb (88 kg)	35 – 15 December 1990
SF	0	(United States)	Bolden, Mo	6 ft 10 in (2.08 m)	205 lb (93 kg)	37 – 18 August 1989
SF	60	(United States)	Capers, Marcus	6 ft 4 in (1.93 m)	180 lb (82 kg)	36 – 21 December 1989
G/F	35	(United States)	Gaines, A. J.	6 ft 4 in (1.93 m)		32 – 5 December 1993
SF	14	(United States)	Isom, Mareik	6 ft 9 in (2.06 m)	217 lb (98 kg)	32 – 25 July 1994
F	13	(Canada)	Iyekekpolor, Otas	6 ft 8 in (2.03 m)	220 lb (100 kg)	30 – 20 June 1996
F	21	(Canada)	Lufile, Abednego	6 ft 7 in (2.01 m)	240 lb (110 kg)	32 – 8 June 1994
C	32	(United States)	Phillips, Randy	6 ft 8 in (2.03 m)	240 lb (110 kg)	31 – 17 July 1995
G	5	(United States)	Strong, Omar	5 ft 9 in (1.75 m)	175 lb (79 kg)	36 – 16 May 1990
G	10	(United States)	Tate, Jaylon (injured)	6 ft 3 in (1.91 m)	170 lb (77 kg)	31 – 16 January 1995
SF	15	(Canada)	Williamson, Garrett	6 ft 7 in (2.01 m)	200 lb (91 kg)	38 – 15 June 1988

Head coach

- Doug Plumb

Assistant coach(es)

- (Canada) Nate Benjamin

Legend

- (C) Team captain
- Injured

- Roster
- Transactions

== Season-by-season record ==
Season	Coach	Regular season				Postseason			
Season	Coach	Won	Lost	Win %	Finish	Won	Lost	Win %	Result
2011–12	Micheal Ray Richardson	28	8	.778	1st	5	2	.714	Champions
2012–13	Micheal Ray Richardson	33	7	.825	1st	6	2	.750	Champions
2013–14	Micheal Ray Richardson	23	17	.575	4th	6	6	.500	Conference semi-finals
2014–15	Carlos Knox	18	14	.563	3rd	2	3	.400	Conference quarter-finals
2015–16	Kyle Julius	26	14	.650	1st	10	6	.500	League runners-up
2016–17	Kyle Julius	35	5	.875	1st	11	2	.846	Champions
2017–18	Keith Vassell	27	13	.675	1st	11	6	.647	Champions
2018–19	Keith Vassell; Elliott Etherington	22	18	.550	1st	2	3	.400	Division Semifinals
2019–20	Doug Plumb	15	9	.625	Season curtailed by the COVID-19 pandemic				
2023–24	Doug Plumb	20	12	.625	2nd	2	1	.667	-
Totals		227	105	.684		53	30	.639	4 championships
