= 2016–17 BIBL season =

2016–17 BIBL
- Season: 2016–17
- Duration: October 10, 2016 – April 20, 2017
- Teams: 12

Finals
- Champions: (Bulgaria) Beroe (1st title)
- Runners-up: (North Macedonia) Kumanovo
- All statistics correct as of 11:26, 26 September 2016 (UTC).

The 2016–17 BIBL, is the ninth edition of Balkan International Basketball League. It started on 10 October 2016.

Twelve teams joined the competition and were divided into two groups of six teams. Top four from each group will qualify for the second stage, where they will be divided into two groups of 4 teams. Winners of both group will qualify to the semifinals, while the runners-up and third-placed teams will qualify for the quarterfinals.

== First stage ==
=== Group A ===
Pos	Team	Pld	W	L	GF	GA	GD	Pts	Qualification	BER	KUM	KOZ	TEO	BAS	PRI
1	(Bulgaria) Beroe	10	7	3	832	785	+47	17	Second stage	—	91–70	91–85	94–72	72–63	86–71
2	(North Macedonia) Kumanovo	10	6	4	792	794	−2	16	Second stage	82–72	—	84–76	78–75	95–96	86–68
3	(North Macedonia) Kožuv	10	5	5	801	755	+46	15	Second stage	80–86	89–71	—	81–76	80–63	73–65
4	(Montenegro) Teodo Tivat	10	5	5	812	801	+11	15	Second stage	93–80	65–73	85–79	—	86–74	88–68
5	(Kosovo) Bashkimi	10	4	6	773	791	−18	14		83–66	83–86	69–66	76–79	—	85–74
6	(Kosovo) Sigal Prishtina	10	3	7	761	845	−84	13		86–94	79–67	65–92	98–93	87–81	—

Source: BIBL Scoresway

=== Group B ===
Pos	Team	Pld	W	L	GF	GA	GD	Pts	Qualification	PEJ	FEN	SUT	KAR	TRE	TIR
1	(Kosovo) Peja	10	7	3	766	673	+93	17	Second stage	—	82–73	76–74	90–64	80–75	96–72
2	(North Macedonia) Feni Industries	10	6	4	749	697	+52	16	Second stage	90–88	—	80–55	85–70	72–54	98–57
3	(Montenegro) Sutjeska	10	5	5	761	726	+35	15	Second stage	67–86	79–71	—	85–81	78–80	77–61
4	(North Macedonia) Karpoš Sokoli	10	5	5	779	800	−21	15	Second stage	82–75	79–63	60–94	—	85–69	78–74
5	(Kosovo) Trepça	10	4	6	639	685	−46	14		0–20 (Note: Trepça lost the game on forfeit after the game was abandoned in the third period due to riots from the home fans, which injured one of the referees and one of Peja's players.)	70–45	75–73	82–80	—	68–74
6	(Albania) Tirana	10	3	7	694	807	−113	13		76–73	63–72	56–79	83–100	78–66	—

Source: BIBL Scoresway

== Second stage ==
In italics, results carried from the first stage.

=== Group C ===
Pos	Team	Pld	W	L	GF	GA	GD	Pts	Qualification	BER	KOZ	FEN	SUT
1	(Bulgaria) Beroe	6	5	1	508	461	+47	11	Semifinals	—	91−85	66–68	104–76
2	(North Macedonia) Kožuv	6	3	3	494	468	+26	9	Quarterfinals	80–86	—	89–73	94–65
3	(North Macedonia) Feni Industries	6	2	4	445	444	+1	8	Quarterfinals	84–85	69–70	—	80−55
4	(Montenegro) Sutjeska	6	2	4	427	501	−74	8		68–76	84–76	79−71	—

Source: BIBL Scoresway

=== Group D ===
Pos	Team	Pld	W	L	GF	GA	GD	Pts	Qualification	KUM	TEO	PEJ	KAR
1	(North Macedonia) Kumanovo	6	5	1	425	402	+23	11	Semifinals	—	78–75	80–76	20–0 (Note: Karpoš Sokoli were excluded by the tournament management, as the club failed to maintain its financial commitment for tournament participation.)
2	(Montenegro) Teodo Tivat	6	3	3	432	391	+41	9	Quarterfinals	65−73	—	104–84	98–81
3	(Kosovo) Peja	6	3	3	485	468	+17	9	Quarterfinals	85–68	75–70	—	90−64
4	(North Macedonia) Karpoš Sokoli	6	1	5	328	409	−81	7		101–106	0–20 (Note: Teodo Tivat won the game on forfeit after the game was abandoned in the third period, as the Karpoš Sokoli coach Dragan Nikolić ordered his players to leave the court without any reason.)	82−75	—

Source: BIBL Scoresway

== Quarterfinals ==
7 March 2017
19:00

Report

Feni Industries (North Macedonia)	100–97	(Montenegro) Teodo
Scoring by quarter: 21−17, 32−26, 19−22, 28−32
Pts: Češković 39; Rebs: Sharabidze 7 Asts: Češković, Petrovski 5		Pts: Popović 25; Rebs: Popović 8 Asts: Stanojević 11

Jasmin Sports Hall, Kavadarci
Referees: Vladimir Tsekov
Iskren Manolov
Ervin Koçi

14 March 2017
18:30

Report

Teodo (Montenegro)	81–68	(North Macedonia) Feni Industries
Scoring by quarter: 20−11, 13−18, 24−20, 24−19
Pts: Stanojević 19; Rebs: Šajin 9 Asts: Stanojević 7		Pts: Petrovski, Sharabidze 14; Rebs: Đekić 10; Asts: Petrovski 9
Teodo won 178−168 on aggregate

Dvorana Župa Tivat, Tivat
Referees: Ademir Zurapović
Dragan Kralj
Mila Čavara

8 March 2017
19:00

Report

Peja (Kosovo)	83–66	(North Macedonia) Kožuv
Scoring by quarter: 20−12, 16−16, 26−20, 21−18
Pts: Abramovič 20; Rebs: Rundles 6 Asts: Rundles 7		Pts: McNeail 27; Rebs: Mijović 8 Asts: McNeail 5

Karagaç Sports Hall, Pejë
Referees: Ognjen Jokić
Vladan Šundić
Milosav Kaluđerović

15 March 2017
19:00

Report

Kožuv (North Macedonia)	77–67	(Kosovo) Peja
Scoring by quarter: 28−13, 15−23, 19−18, 15−13
Pts: Krstevski 20; Rebs: Đurasović 10; Asts: McNeail 5		Pts: Billie 22; Rebs: Veseli 10; Asts: Abramovič, Rundles 2
Peja won 150−143 on aggregate

Sportska sala 26 April, Gevgelija
Referees: Ventsislav Velikov
Georgios Poursanidis
Martin Horozov

== Semifinals ==
21 March 2017
18:30

Report

Teodo (Montenegro)	69–78	(Bulgaria) Beroe
Scoring by quarter: 20−14, 14−26, 16−22, 19−16
Pts: Popović 20; Rebs: Marojević 9 Asts: Stanojević 9		Pts: Raley-Ross 27; Rebs: Raley-Ross, Tesija 5 Asts: Raley-Ross 7

Dvorana Župa Tivat, Tivat
Referees: Haris Bijedić
Ivan Miličević
Ernad Karović

28 March 2017
18:30

Report

Beroe (Bulgaria)	92–56	(Montenegro) Teodo
Scoring by quarter: 21−10, 19−15, 33−19, 19−12
Pts: Gudul 23; Rebs: Jones 10; Asts: Raley-Ross, Gibson 5		Pts: Popović 26; Rebs: Popović 10; Asts: Stanojević 4
Beroe won 170−125 on aggregate

Obshtinska zala, Stara Zagora
Referees: Marius Ciulin
Florin Grigoraș
Laszlo Bukuresti

22 March 2017
19:00

Report

Peja (Kosovo)	83–79	(North Macedonia) Kumanovo
Scoring by quarter: 20−14, 18−18, 19−22, 26−25
Pts: Abramovič 22; Rebs: Veseli 12; Asts: Miljanić 7		Pts: Brown 33; Rebs: Janevski 12; Asts: Karadžovski 6

Karagaç Sports Hall, Pejë
Referees: Radomir Vojinović
Zdravko Rutešić
Ognjen Jokić

29 March 2017
19:00

Report

Kumanovo (North Macedonia)	86–80	(Kosovo) Peja
Scoring by quarter: 18−25, 19−19, 24−21, 25−15
Pts: Janevski 21; Rebs: Karadžovski 9 Asts: Karadžovski 5		Pts: Miljanić 21; Rebs: Veseli 7 Asts: Veseli, Ahmetbašić 5
Kumanovo won 165−163 on aggregate

Sports Hall Kumanovo, Kumanovo
Referees: Miroslav Tomov
Vladimir Tsekov
Martin Horozov

== Finals ==
11 April 2017
18:30

Report

Beroe (Bulgaria)	84–55	(North Macedonia) Kumanovo
Scoring by quarter: 20−12, 26−13, 16−15, 22−15
Pts: Gibson 25; Rebs: Jones 12; Asts: Raley-Ross 9		Pts: Karadžovski 14; Rebs: Janevski 7 Asts: Karadžovski 3

Obshtinska zala, Stara Zagora
Attendance: 1,200
Referees: Haris Bijedić
Georgios Poursanidis
Ivan Miličević

18 April 2017
19:00

Report

Kumanovo (North Macedonia)	73–77	(Bulgaria) Beroe
Scoring by quarter: 9−22, 17−20, 30−11, 17−24
Pts: Janevski 15; Rebs: R. Peković 9 Asts: four players 3		Pts: Raley-Ross 17; Rebs: Tešija 7 Asts: Raley-Ross 5
Beroe won 161−128 on aggregate

Sports Hall Kumanovo, Kumanovo
Attendance: 2,000
Referees: Ademir Zurapović
Ognjen Jokić
Milosav Kaluđerović

2016–17 Balkan League Champions

Beroe Stara Zagora
1st Title
