= NBL Canada Defensive Player of the Year Award =

The National Basketball League of Canada's Defensive Player of the Year Award is an annual National Basketball League of Canada (NBL) award given since the 2011–12 season. The London Lightning's Al Stewart was named Defensive Player of the Year in 2012 and 2013, the most seasons a single player has won the award.

== Winners ==
Season	Player	Position	Nationality	Team	Reference
2011–12	Al Stewart	Guard	United States	London Lightning	
2012–13	Al Stewart (2)	Guard	United States	London Lightning	
2013–14	Cavell Johnson	Forward	United States	Brampton A's	
2014–15	Kevin Young	Forward	Puerto Rico	Halifax Rainmen	
2015–16	Anthony Stover	Center	United States	Saint John Mill Rats	
2016–17	Rahlir Hollis-Jefferson	Forward	United States	Orangeville A's	
2017–18	Du'Vaughn Maxwell	Forward	United States	Island Storm	
2018–19	Rhamel Brown	Forward	United States	Halifax Hurricanes	
2019–20	Marcus Capers	Guard	United States	London Lightning	
2020-21	Not awarded — Season cancelled due to COVID-19 pandemic.				
2022	Tyran Walker	Forward/Centre	United States	KW Titans	
