= NBL Canada Most Valuable Player Award =

Canadian basketball award

The National Basketball League of Canada Most Valuable Player (MVP) is an annual National Basketball League of Canada award given since the league's inaugural 2011–12 season for the best performing player in the regular season. The winner, along with those of the other major awards, are nominated by the NBL Canada coaches. Every player that has been named MVP has come from the United States, with the exception of English, and none have won it multiple times.

== Winners ==
| Season | Player | Position | Nationality | Team |
|---|---|---|---|---|
| 2011–12 | Gabe Freeman | Forward | United States | London Lightning |
| 2012–13 | Devin Sweetney | Guard / forward | United States | Moncton Miracles |
| 2013–14 | Anthony Anderson | Guard | United States | Saint John Mill Rats |
| 2014–15 | Quinnel Brown | Forward | United States | Windsor Express |
| 2015–16 | Logan Stutz | Forward | United States | Niagara River Lions |
| 2016–17 | Royce White | Forward | United States | London Lightning |
| 2017–18 | Carl English | Guard | Canada | St. John's Edge |
| 2018–19 | Braylon Rayson | Guard | United States | Sudbury Five |
| 2019–20 | Billy White | Forward | United States | Moncton Magic |
| 2020-21 | Not awarded — Season cancelled due to COVID-19 pandemic. | | | |
| 2022 | Joel Kindred | Guard | United States | KW Titans |
| 2023 | Jeremy Harris | Forward | United States | Sudbury Five |
