= 2025–26 Basketball Champions League Americas =

Basketball Champions League Americas
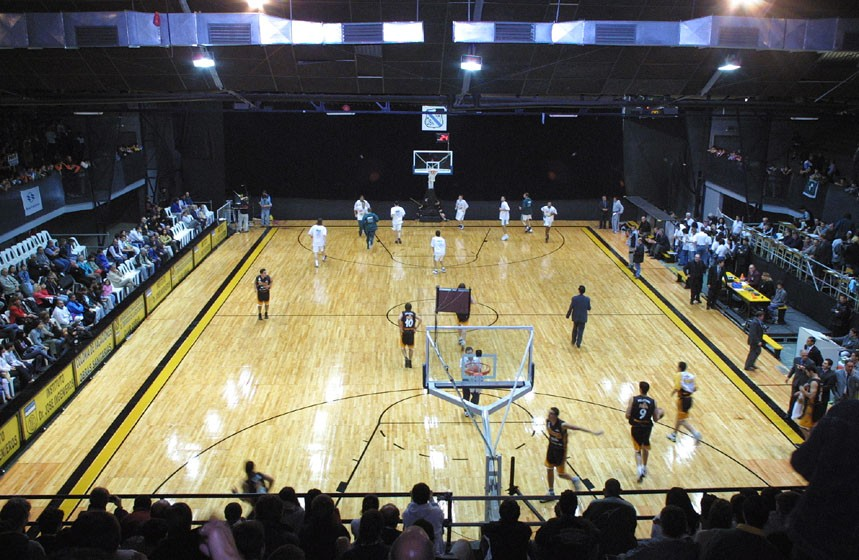
- The Estadio Obras Sanitarias hosted the Final Four
- Season: 2025–26
- Dates: 10 December 2025 – 18 April 2026
- Teams: 12

Finals
- Champions: (Argentina) Boca Juniors; 1st league title 1st continental title
- Runners-up: (Brazil) Sesi Franca
- Third place: (Uruguay) Nacional
- Fourth place: (Brazil) Flamengo

Awards
- Season MVP: Francisco Cáffaro (Boca Juniors)

The 2025–26 Basketball Champions League Americas season, also referred to as the BCL Americas Season 7, is the 7th season of the Basketball Champions League Americas (BCLA). It is also the 27th season of Pan-American top-level competition, as well as the 64rd season of South American top-level competition.

The season began on 10 December 2025 and will end in April 2026.

== Team allocation ==
The twelve teams were announced on 25 September 2025 by FIBA.

- 1st, 2nd, etc.: Position in national league
- WC: Wild card
Location of teams of the 2025–26 BCL Americas group stage.
Red: Group A; Green: Group B; Yellow: Group C; Blue: Group D.

(Argentina) Boca Juniors (1st)	(Brazil) Sesi Franca (1st)	(Chile) Universidad de Concepción (1st)	(Mexico) Astros de Jalisco (1st)
(Argentina) Instituto (2nd)	(Brazil) KTO Minas (2nd)	(Colombia) Paisas (1st)	(Uruguay) Nacional (1st)
(Argentina) Obras Basket (WC)	(Brazil) Flamengo (TH)	(Colombia) Caimanes del Llano (2nd)	(Uruguay) Aguada (2nd)

== Draw ==
The draw took place on 26 September 2025 in Miami, United States at 16:00 ET. Group A was pre-determined based on geographical reasons and Groups B, C and D were decided through the draw. It was also confirmed that the highest-ranked teams from Argentina, Brazil, and Uruguay in their most recent full national league season would be seeded as the heads of Groups B, C, and D. Additionally, each group was restricted to only one team per country to ensure balance.

Group stage draw
Pot 1	Pot 2	Pot 3	Pot 4
(Argentina) Boca Juniors; (Brazil) Sesi Franca; (Uruguay) Nacional	(Argentina) Instituto; (Argentina) Obras Basket	(Brazil) KTO Minas; (Brazil) Flamengo	(Chile) Universidad de Concepción; (Uruguay) Aguada

== Group stage ==
=== Group A ===
Pos	Team	Pld	W	L	PF	PA	PD	Pts	Qualification
1	(Mexico) Astros de Jalisco	6	6	0	706	431	+275	12	Advance to quarter-finals
2	(Colombia) Paisas	6	3	3	537	540	−3	9	Advance to quarter-finals
3	(Colombia) Caimanes del Llano	6	0	6	436	708	−272	6	

Source: FIBA
Rules for classification: 1) Points; 2) Head-to-head results; 3) Points difference; 4) Points scored.

27 January 2026	Paisas (Colombia)	109–62	(Colombia) Caimanes del Llano	Medellín, Colombia
19:40	Scoring by quarter: 24–17, 26–15, 29–9, 30–21
	Pts: Almanza 17; Rebs: Bethelmy 9 Asts: Ruiz 8	Boxscore	Pts: Smith 15; Rebs: Mendoza, Torres 6 Asts: three players 4	Arena: Coliseo Iván de Bedout; Referees: Juan Fernández (ARG), Orlando Varela (HON), Danilo Molina (ARG)

28 January 2026	Caimanes del Llano (Colombia)	70–123	(Mexico) Astros de Jalisco	Medellín, Colombia
19:40	Scoring by quarter: 16–35, 13–29, 23–29, 18–30
	Pts: Foxbrennen Jr., Muñoz 12; Rebs: J. Smith, Valencia 8 Asts: Britos, Muñoz 5	Boxscore	Pts: De Lattibeaudiere, Perry 22; Rebs: Perry 7 Asts: Henriquez 6	Arena: Coliseo Iván de Bedout; Attendance: 100; Referees: Carlos Peralta (ECU), Julirys Guzmán (PUR), Danilo Molina (ARG)

29 January 2026	Paisas (Colombia)	59–87	(Mexico) Astros de Jalisco	Medellín, Colombia
19:40	Scoring by quarter: 9–16, 18–29, 14–18, 18–24
	Pts: Miles 17; Rebs: Augustin 7 Asts: Ruiz, Weatherspoon 3	Boxscore	Pts: Henriquez, Perry 14; Rebs: Perry 10; Asts: three players 3	Arena: Coliseo Iván de Bedout; Attendance: 2,793; Referees: Juan Fernández (ARG), Carlos Peralta (ECU), Orlando Varela (HON)

1 February 2026	Caimanes del Llano (Colombia)	69–131	(Mexico) Astros de Jalisco	Villavicencio, Colombia
19:10	Scoring by quarter: 13–28, 20–38, 13–36, 23–29
	Pts: Britos 19; Rebs: J. Smith 5 Asts: Britos, J. Smith 4	Boxscore	Pts: Carrera 18; Rebs: De Lattibeaudiere 8 Asts: Stoll 7	Arena: Coliseo Álvaro Mesa Amaya; Referees: Alan dos Santos (BRA), Julirys Guzmán (PUR), Danilo Molina (ARG)

2 February 2026	Astros de Jalisco (Mexico)	100–92	(Colombia) Paisas	Villavicencio, Colombia
19:10	Scoring by quarter: 32–24, 17–20, 28–27, 23–21
	Pts: Smith 27; Rebs: Carrera 12; Asts: Stoll 5	Boxscore	Pts: Weatherspoon 19; Rebs: Augustin 9 Asts: Miles 6	Arena: Coliseo Álvaro Mesa Amaya; Referees: Juan Fernández (ARG), Alan dos Santos (BRA), Orlando Varela (HON)

3 February 2026	Caimanes del Llano (Colombia)	91–107	(Colombia) Paisas	Villavicencio, Colombia
19:10	Scoring by quarter: 17–28, 25–28, 22–20, 27–31
	Pts: Valencia 25; Rebs: Valencia 13; Asts: Muñoz 7	Boxscore	Pts: Crawford 22; Rebs: Crawford 9 Asts: Ruiz 9	Arena: Coliseo Álvaro Mesa Amaya; Referees: Julirys Guzmán (PUR), Juan Fernández (ARG), Alan dos Santos (BRA)

10 February 2026	Astros de Jalisco (Mexico)	125–72	(Colombia) Paisas	Guadalajara, Mexico
20:10	Scoring by quarter: 31–17, 26–23, 30–18, 38–14
	Pts: De Lattibeaudiere 27; Rebs: Perry 8 Asts: three players 4	Boxscore	Pts: Tabb 17; Rebs: Tabb 6 Asts: three players 3	Arena: Arena Astros; Attendance: 2,000; Referees: Johnny Batista (PUR), Daniel García (VEN), Fernando Leite (BRA)

11 February 2026	Paisas (Colombia)	98–75	(Colombia) Caimanes del Llano	Guadalajara, Mexico
20:10	Scoring by quarter: 29–16, 22–16, 23–24, 24–19
	Pts: Weatherspoon 34; Rebs: Solís 8 Asts: Miles 5	Boxscore	Pts: Britos 17; Rebs: Mendoza 8 Asts: Salcedo 4	Arena: Arena Astros; Attendance: 1,403; Referees: Krishna Domínguez (MEX), Fernando Leite (BRA), Nicolas Zivieri (BRA)

12 February 2026	Astros de Jalisco (Mexico)	140–69	(Colombia) Caimanes del Llano	Guadalajara, Mexico
20:10	Scoring by quarter: 24–24, 39–19, 36–9, 41–17
	Pts: Burke 31; Rebs: D. Smith 9 Asts: D. Smith 11	Boxscore	Pts: Britos 20; Rebs: J. Smith 5 Asts: Britos 4	Arena: Arena Astros; Attendance: 2,214; Referees: Johnny Batista (PUR), Daniel García (VEN), Nicolas Zivieri (BRA)

=== Group B ===
Pos	Team	Pld	W	L	PF	PA	PD	Pts	Qualification
1	(Uruguay) Nacional	6	6	0	501	436	+65	12	Advance to quarter-finals
2	(Brazil) Flamengo	6	2	4	479	490	−11	8	Advance to quarter-finals
3	(Argentina) Obras Basket	6	1	5	449	503	−54	7	

Source: FIBA
Rules for classification: 1) Points; 2) Head-to-head results; 3) Points difference; 4) Points scored.

13 December 2025	Nacional (Uruguay)	75–63	(Brazil) Flamengo	Paysandú, Uruguay
21:10	Scoring by quarter: 14–16, 16–13, 23–11, 22–23
	Pts: Zinaich 21; Rebs: Zinaich 10; Asts: Parodi 4	Boxscore	Pts: Negrete 19; Rebs: Bost 8 Asts: Johnson 3	Arena: Estadio 8 de Junio; Referees: Juan Fernández (ARG), Johnny Batista (PUR), Carlos Pallares (COL)

14 December 2025	Flamengo (Brazil)	84–80	(Argentina) Obras Basket	Paysandú, Uruguay
21:10	Scoring by quarter: 17–19, 20–20, 26–20, 21–21
	Pts: Negrete 19; Rebs: Bost 7 Asts: Negrete 6	Boxscore	Pts: Sabin 20; Rebs: Corum 7 Asts: Barral, Brussino 7	Arena: Estadio 8 de Junio; Attendance: 600; Referees: Andrés Bartel (URU), Daniel García (VEN), Coopper Toppings (CAN)

15 December 2025	Nacional (Uruguay)	75–71	(Argentina) Obras Basket	Paysandú, Uruguay
21:10	Scoring by quarter: 17–18, 20–21, 15–19, 23–13
	Pts: Zinaich 22; Rebs: Zinaich 10; Asts: Parodi 9	Boxscore	Pts: Sabin 16; Rebs: Corum 9 Asts: Barral 7	Arena: Estadio 8 de Junio; Attendance: 2,800; Referees: Johnny Batista (PUR), Grant Todey (USA), Carlos Pallares (COL)

17 January 2026	Flamengo (Brazil)	102–66	(Argentina) Obras Basket	Rio de Janeiro, Brazil
19:10	Scoring by quarter: 29–11, 33–13, 16–17, 24–25
	Pts: Deodato 22; Rebs: Deodato, Manfio 6 Asts: Baralle 5	Boxscore	Pts: López, Sabin 12; Rebs: Corum 6 Asts: Brussino 7	Arena: Ginásio do Maracanãzinho; Attendance: 1,651; Referees: Johnny Batista (PUR), Daniel García (VEN), Carlos Pallares (COL)

18 January 2026	Obras Basket (Argentina)	74–90	(Uruguay) Nacional	Rio de Janeiro, Brazil
19:10	Scoring by quarter: 20–29, 15–27, 18–17, 21–17
	Pts: Barral 15; Rebs: Barral, Sabin 3 Asts: Barral 6	Boxscore	Pts: Zinaich 15; Rebs: Zinaich 8 Asts: Parodi 6	Arena: Ginásio do Maracanãzinho; Referees: Daniel García (VEN), Fernando Leite (BRA), Edwin Quiles (PUR)

19 January 2026	Flamengo (Brazil)	76–95	(Uruguay) Nacional	Rio de Janeiro, Brazil
19:10	Scoring by quarter: 22–34, 17–25, 14–14, 23–22
	Pts: Fernandes 21; Rebs: Fernandes 10; Asts: Negrete 8	Boxscore	Pts: Oglivie 20; Rebs: Espíndola 9 Asts: Parodi 5	Arena: Ginásio do Maracanãzinho; Referees: Johnny Batista (PUR), Daniel García (VEN), Edwin Quiles (PUR)

7 February 2026	Obras Basket (Argentina)	73–77	(Uruguay) Nacional	Buenos Aires, Argentina
19:10	Scoring by quarter: 16–15, 24–17, 19–21, 14–24
	Pts: Corum 20; Rebs: Delía 10; Asts: Barral 5	Boxscore	Pts: Zinaich 21; Rebs: Zinaich 14; Asts: Parodi 4	Arena: Estadio Obras Sanitarias; Referees: Carlos Vélez (COL), Krishna Domínguez (MEX), Orlando Varela (HON)

8 February 2026	Nacional (Uruguay)	89–79	(Brazil) Flamengo	Buenos Aires, Argentina
19:10	Scoring by quarter: 21–27, 24–18, 33–24, 11–10
	Pts: Feldeine 25; Rebs: Prieto, Zinaich 6 Asts: Feldeine 6	Boxscore	Pts: Negrete 17; Rebs: Baralle 6 Asts: Johnson 5	Arena: Estadio Obras Sanitarias; Referees: Roberto Vázquez (PUR), Carlos Vélez (COL), Claudio Osorio (CHI)

9 February 2026	Obras Basket (Argentina)	85–75	(Brazil) Flamengo	Buenos Aires, Argentina
19:10	Scoring by quarter: 16–11, 25–19, 16–26, 28–19
	Pts: Brussino 19; Rebs: Corum, Zezular 7 Asts: Barral, Brussino 6	Boxscore	Pts: Negrete 22; Rebs: Ferreira 7 Asts: three players 3	Arena: Estadio Obras Sanitarias; Referees: Roberto Vázquez (PUR), Krishna Domínguez (MEX), Orlando Varela (HON)

=== Group C ===
Pos	Team	Pld	W	L	PF	PA	PD	Pts	Qualification
1	(Argentina) Boca Juniors	6	4	2	503	437	+66	10 (Note: Head-to-head series: Boca Juniors 2–1 KTO Minas.)	Advance to quarter-finals
2	(Brazil) KTO Minas	6	4	2	490	441	+49	10	Advance to quarter-finals
3	(Uruguay) Aguada	6	1	5	424	539	−115	7	

Source: FIBA
Rules for classification: 1) Points; 2) Head-to-head results; 3) Points difference; 4) Points scored.
Notes:

10 December 2025	Aguada (Uruguay)	71–88	(Argentina) Boca Juniors	Paysandú, Uruguay
21:40	Scoring by quarter: 21–24, 13–19, 14–19, 23–26
	Pts: Clark 18; Rebs: Clark, Pereiras 7 Asts: Santiso, Sims 3	Boxscore	Pts: Smith 18; Rebs: Cáffaro 11; Asts: Smith 9	Arena: Estadio 8 de Junio; Attendance: 1,205; Referees: Johnny Batista (PUR), Daniel García (VEN), Carlos Pallares (COL)

11 December 2025	Boca Juniors (Argentina)	61–80	(Brazil) KTO Minas	Paysandú, Uruguay
21:40	Scoring by quarter: 19–15, 18–19, 14–19, 10–27
	Pts: Smith 19; Rebs: three players 6 Asts: Smith, Vega 4	Boxscore	Pts: Williams 16; Rebs: Fuzaro 6 Asts: Davis 5	Arena: Estadio 8 de Junio; Attendance: 352; Referees: Andrés Bartel (URU), Daniel García (VEN), Grant Todey (USA)

12 December 2025	Aguada (Uruguay)	74–77	(Brazil) KTO Minas	Paysandú, Uruguay
21:40	Scoring by quarter: 19–24, 19–16, 20–14, 16–23
	Pts: Clark 14; Rebs: Clark 6 Asts: Santiso 6	Boxscore	Pts: McCree 19; Rebs: Braga, McCree 7 Asts: three players 2	Arena: Estadio 8 de Junio; Referees: Juan Fernández (ARG), Grant Todey (USA), Cooper Toppings (CAN)

14 January 2026	Boca Juniors (Argentina)	92–77	(Brazil) KTO Minas	Buenos Aires, Argentina
22:10	Scoring by quarter: 21–13, 25–23, 27–18, 19–23
	Pts: Barreiro 22; Rebs: Barreiro 14; Asts: Cáffaro, Faggiano 5	Boxscore	Pts: Rodríguez 22; Rebs: Paranhos, Rachel 6 Asts: Fischer 5	Arena: Estadio Luis Conde; Referees: Krishna Domínguez (MEX), Carlos Vélez (COL), Claudio Osorio (CHI)

15 January 2026	KTO Minas (Brazil)	95–75	(Uruguay) Aguada	Buenos Aires, Argentina
21:10	Scoring by quarter: 24–21, 28–15, 21–19, 22–20
	Pts: Rachel 19; Rebs: Paranhos 9 Asts: Fuzaro 6	Boxscore	Pts: Santos 23; Rebs: Zuvich 9 Asts: Vidal 9	Arena: Estadio Luis Conde; Referees: Carlos Vélez (COL), Nicolás Flores (PAR), Franco Anselmo (ARG)

16 January 2026	Boca Juniors (Argentina)	84–88	(Uruguay) Aguada	Buenos Aires, Argentina
21:10	Scoring by quarter: 21–25, 13–21, 29–23, 21–19
	Pts: Vega 18; Rebs: Cáffaro 13; Asts: Smith 6	Boxscore	Pts: Clark 22; Rebs: Santos 10; Asts: Vidal 12	Arena: Estadio Luis Conde; Referees: Krishna Domínguez (MEX), Nicolás Flores (PAR), Claudio Osorio (CHI)

4 February 2026	KTO Minas (Brazil)	94–62	(Uruguay) Aguada	Belo Horizonte, Brazil
19:10	Scoring by quarter: 30–25, 20–16, 24–8, 20–13
	Pts: Paranhos 14; Rebs: Rachel, Williams 8 Asts: Rodríguez 7	Boxscore	Pts: Vidal, Zuvich 14; Rebs: three players 5 Asts: Santiso, Vidal 5	Arena: Arena UniBH; Referees: Daniel García (VEN), Roberto Fernández (CRC), Carmelo de la Rosa (PUR)

5 February 2026	Aguada (Uruguay)	54–101	(Argentina) Boca Juniors	Belo Horizonte, Brazil
19:10	Scoring by quarter: 11–28, 14–26, 21–26, 8–21
	Pts: Santos 25; Rebs: Santos 9 Asts: Vidal 7	Boxscore	Pts: Barreiro, Vega 15; Rebs: Giorgetti 7 Asts: Faggiano 8	Arena: Arena UniBH; Referees: Omar Bermúdez (MEX), Daniel García (VEN), João Varella (BRA)

6 February 2026	KTO Minas (Brazil)	67–77	(Argentina) Boca Juniors	Belo Horizonte, Brazil
19:10	Scoring by quarter: 12–24, 20–10, 22–18, 13–25
	Pts: Fuzaro 16; Rebs: McCree 9 Asts: Rodríguez 4	Boxscore	Pts: Smith 16; Rebs: Barreiro, Giorgetti 10; Asts: Faggiano 8	Arena: Arena UniBH; Referees: Omar Bermúdez (MEX), Roberto Fernández (CRC), Carmelo de la Rosa (PUR)

=== Group D ===
Pos	Team	Pld	W	L	PF	PA	PD	Pts	Qualification
1	(Brazil) Sesi Franca	6	4	2	572	462	+110	10 (Note: Head-to-head series: Sesi Franca 2–1 Instituto.)	Advance to quarter-finals
2	(Argentina) Instituto	6	4	2	506	524	−18	10	Advance to quarter-finals
3	(Chile) Universidad de Concepción	6	1	5	457	549	−92	7	

Source: FIBA
Rules for classification: 1) Points; 2) Head-to-head results; 3) Points difference; 4) Points scored.
Notes:

10 December 2025	Universidad de Concepción (Chile)	74–80	(Argentina) Instituto	Concepción, Chile
19:10	Scoring by quarter: 12–26, 23–19, 20–21, 19–14
	Pts: Maxwell 26; Rebs: Low 8 Asts: Bocaz 6	Boxscore	Pts: Boone 20; Rebs: Boone 12; Asts: Copello, Whelan 5	Arena: Casa del Deporte; Referees: Krishna Domínguez (MEX), Carlos Vélez (COL), Nicolás Flores (PAR)

11 December 2025	Instituto (Argentina)	93–89(OT)	(Brazil) Sesi Franca	Concepción, Chile
19:10	Scoring by quarter: 18–21, 22–26, 17–16, 22–16, Overtime: 14–10
	Pts: Saiz 18; Rebs: Boone 10; Asts: Copello 6	Boxscore	Pts: De Paula 24; Rebs: Jackson 7 Asts: De Paula 5	Arena: Casa del Deporte; Attendance: 300; Referees: Krishna Domínguez (MEX), Orlando Varela (HON), Claudio Osorio (CHI)

12 December 2025	Universidad de Concepción (Chile)	79–85	(Brazil) Sesi Franca	Concepción, Chile
19:10	Scoring by quarter: 18–27, 19–22, 15–20, 27–16
	Pts: Maxwell 22; Rebs: Maxwell 10; Asts: Bocaz 9	Boxscore	Pts: Dias 20; Rebs: Felício 8 Asts: De Paula 9	Arena: Casa del Deporte; Attendance: 500; Referees: Carlos Vélez (COL), Orlando Varela (HON), Nicolás Flores (PAR)

14 January 2026	Sesi Franca (Brazil)	120–62	(Chile) Universidad de Concepción	Franca, Brazil
18:40	Scoring by quarter: 29–11, 18–22, 39–13, 34–16
	Pts: Dias 23; Rebs: Felício 8 Asts: Antunes 7	Boxscore	Pts: Saravia 16; Rebs: Amor 7 Asts: Vander 2	Arena: Ginásio Pedrocão; Attendance: 1,132; Referees: Andrés Bartel (URU), Carmelo de la Rosa (PUR), Cooper Toppings (CAN)

15 January 2026	Universidad de Concepción (Chile)	76–98	(Argentina) Instituto	Franca, Brazil
18:40	Scoring by quarter: 17–26, 19–24, 24–20, 16–28
	Pts: Maxwell 21; Rebs: Pereira 7 Asts: Amor 4	Boxscore	Pts: Cook 22; Rebs: Copello, Saiz 8 Asts: Vildoza 7	Arena: Ginásio Pedrocão; Referees: Waseem Husainy (CAN), Carmelo de la Rosa (PUR), Nicolas Zivieri (BRA)

16 January 2026	Sesi Franca (Brazil)	110–80	(Argentina) Instituto	Franca, Brazil
18:40	Scoring by quarter: 31–13, 25–23, 35–23, 19–22
	Pts: De Paula 19; Rebs: Felício 16; Asts: De Paula 6	Boxscore	Pts: Cook 23; Rebs: Caicedo 10; Asts: Whelan 7	Arena: Ginásio Pedrocão; Referees: Andrés Bartel (URU), Waseem Husainy (CAN), Cooper Toppings (CAN)

7 February 2026	Instituto (Argentina)	68–89	(Brazil) Sesi Franca	Córdoba, Argentina
22:10	Scoring by quarter: 19–24, 16–27, 20–16, 13–22
	Pts: Monacchi 12; Rebs: Monacchi 11; Asts: Copello, Vildoza 4	Boxscore	Pts: Jackson 23; Rebs: Felício, Jackson 9 Asts: De Paula 4	Arena: Gimnasio Ángel Sandrín; Referees: Andrés Bartel (URU), Jesed Díaz (PUR), Nicolás Flores (PAR)

8 February 2026	Sesi Franca (Brazil)	79–80	(Chile) Universidad de Concepción	Córdoba, Argentina
22:10	Scoring by quarter: 24–29, 16–18, 22–15, 17–18
	Pts: Jackson 17; Rebs: Mineiro 10; Asts: De Paula 4	Boxscore	Pts: Maxwell 27; Rebs: Maxwell 9 Asts: Amor 6	Arena: Gimnasio Ángel Sandrín; Referees: Jesed Díaz (PUR), Franco Anselmo (ARG), Edwin Quiles (PUR)

9 February 2026	Instituto (Argentina)	87–86	(Chile) Universidad de Concepción	Córdoba, Argentina
22:10	Scoring by quarter: 21–25, 18–25, 20–20, 28–16
	Pts: Copello, Loveridge 20; Rebs: Monacchi 7 Asts: Vildoza 9	Boxscore	Pts: Evans Jr. 21; Rebs: Maxwell 9 Asts: Rubio 4	Arena: Gimnasio Ángel Sandrín; Referees: Andrés Bartel (URU), Nicolás Flores (PAR), Edwin Quiles (PUR)

== Quarterfinals ==
The quarterfinals will take place in March 2026. The four winners will advance to the Final Four. Teams listed as "Team 1" hosted games 2 and 3. The schedule was confirmed on 13 February 2025.

Team 1	Series	Team 2	Game 1	Game 2	Game 3
Astros de Jalisco (Mexico)	0–2	(Brazil) Flamengo	99–101	75–77	—
Boca Juniors (Argentina)	2–0	(Argentina) Instituto	90–74	75–68	—
Sesi Franca (Brazil)	2–1	(Brazil) KTO Minas	98–90	101–110	103–91
Nacional (Uruguay)	2–0	(Colombia) Paisas	97–94	96–75	—

=== Astros de Jalisco vs. Flamengo ===
6 March 2026 Game 1	Flamengo (Brazil)	101–99 (Series: 1–0)	(Mexico) Astros de Jalisco	Rio de Janeiro, Brazil
19:10	Scoring by quarter: 33–19, 23–26, 22–21, 23–33
	Pts: Deodato 24; Rebs: Deodato 7 Asts: Baralle, Negrete 4	Boxscore	Pts: Perry 31; Rebs: Perry 7 Asts: three players 4	Arena: Ginásio do Maracanãzinho; Attendance: 421; Referees: Juan Fernández (ARG), Daniel García (VEN), Carlos Pallares (COL)

13 March 2026 Game 2	Astros de Jalisco (Mexico)	75–77 (Series: 0–2)	(Brazil) Flamengo	Guadalajara, Mexico
20:40	Scoring by quarter: 16–25, 24–18, 17–12, 18–22
	Pts: Burke 27; Rebs: Mencia 14; Asts: Stoll 3	Boxscore	Pts: Deodato 16; Rebs: Cummings 8 Asts: Borges 3	Arena: Arena Astros; Attendance: 2,796; Referees: Roberto Vasquez (PUR), Grant Alexander Todey (USA), Cooper Toppings (CAN)

=== Boca Juniors vs. Instituto ===
9 March 2026 Game 1	Instituto (Argentina)	74–90 (Series: 0–1)	(Argentina) Boca Juniors	Córdoba, Argentina
20:10	Scoring by quarter: 17–18, 15–28, 28–25, 14–19
	Pts: Copello 16; Rebs: three players 7 Asts: Copello, Loveridge 3	Boxscore	Pts: Vega 18; Rebs: Vega 8 Asts: Cuello, Scala 3	Arena: Gimnasio Ángel Sandrín; Referees: Daniel García (VEN), Krishna Domínguez (MEX), Fernando Leite (BRA)

12 March 2026 Game 2	Boca Juniors (Argentina)	75–68 (Series: 2–0)	(Argentina) Instituto	Buenos Aires, Argentina
21:40	Scoring by quarter: 19–19, 20–20, 21–14, 15–15
	Pts: Scala 16; Rebs: Barreiro 8 Asts: Smith 4	Boxscore	Pts: Monacchi 20; Rebs: Garello, Monacchi 7 Asts: Vildoza, Schattmann 5	Arena: Estadio Luis Conde; Referees: Omar Bermudez (MEX), Andrés Bartel (URU), Nicolas Daniel Flores Avalos (PAR)

=== Sesi Franca vs. KTO Minas ===
8 March 2026 Game 1	KTO Minas (Brazil)	90–98 (Series: 0–1)	(Brazil) Sesi Franca	Belo Horizonte, Brazil
19:10	Scoring by quarter: 13–23, 26–30, 21–17, 30–28
	Pts: Paranhos, Williams 20; Rebs: Paranhos 7 Asts: Frazier 6	Boxscore	Pts: Dias, Jackson 20; Rebs: Felício 9 Asts: De Paula, Jackson 5	Arena: Arena UniBH; Referees: Juan Fernández (ARG), Andrés Bartel (URU), Jayson Stiell (CAN)

11 March 2026 Game 2	Sesi Franca (Brazil)	101–110 (Series: 1–1)	(Brazil) KTO Minas	Franca, Brazil
19:40	Scoring by quarter: 23–23, 26–22, 22–33, 30–32
	Pts: Dias 17; Rebs: Dias 7 Asts: De Paula 8	Boxscore	Pts: McCree 27; Rebs: Braga 7 Asts: Fischer 7	Arena: Ginásio Pedrocão; Referees: Johnny Batista (PUR), Daniel García (VEN), Edwin Quiles (PUR)

12 March 2026 Game 3	Sesi Franca (Brazil)	103–91 (Series: 2–1)	(Brazil) KTO Minas	Franca, Brazil
19:10	Scoring by quarter: 27–23, 25–21, 32–21, 19–26
	Pts: Rodriguez Jr. 27; Rebs: Dias 10; Asts: De Paula 7	Boxscore	Pts: Frazier 23; Rebs: Braga 7 Asts: Fischer, Frazier 5	Arena: Ginásio Pedrocão; Attendance: 1,497; Referees: Johnny Batista (PUR), Daniel García (VEN), Jayson Anthony Stiell (CAN)

=== Nacional vs. Paisas ===
6 March 2026 Game 1	Paisas (Colombia)	94–97 (Series: 0–1)	(Uruguay) Nacional	Medellín, Colombia
19:40	Scoring by quarter: 25–25, 26–28, 23–26, 20–18
	Pts: Roque 23; Rebs: Augustin 7 Asts: Miles, Roque 4	Boxscore	Pts: Zinaich 17; Rebs: Zinaich 12; Asts: Parodi 4	Arena: Coliseo Iván de Bedout; Attendance: 2,450; Referees: Omar Bermúdez (MEX), Johnny Batista (PUR), Roberto Fernández (CRC)

14 March 2026 Game 2	Nacional (Uruguay)	96–75 (Series: 2–0)	(Colombia) Paisas	Paysandú, Uruguay
20:40	Scoring by quarter: 22–17, 22–19, 30–17, 22–22
	Pts: Feldeine, Zinaich 17; Rebs: Zinaich 13; Asts: Feldeine 5	Boxscore	Pts: Reaves 26; Rebs: Reaves 6 Asts: Roque 6	Arena: Estadio 8 de Junio; Attendance: 2,002; Referees: Juan Fernandez (ARG), Krishna Dominguez (MEX), Franco Anselmo (ARG)

== Final Four ==
The Final Four will take place on 17 and 18 April 2026. On 25 March, FIBA announced the round will be hosted by Boca Juniors at the Estadio Obras Sanitarias in Buenos Aires, Argentina.

=== Bracket ===
Semifinals
17 April
(Brazil) Flamengo	58
(Argentina) Boca Juniors	81
17 April
(Uruguay) Nacional	71
(Brazil) Sesi Franca	83

Final
18 April
(Argentina) Boca Juniors	86
(Brazil) Sesi Franca	72
Third place game
18 April
(Brazil) Flamengo	65
(Uruguay) Nacional	94

=== Semifinals ===
17 April 2025	Nacional (Uruguay)	71–83	(Brazil) Sesi Franca	Buenos Aires, Argentina
17:40	Scoring by quarter: 16–29, 22–17, 21–18, 12–19
	Pts: Oglivie 14; Rebs: Thomas 9 Asts: Parodi 6	Boxscore	Pts: Georginho 14; Rebs: Georginho 8 Asts: Lucas 5	Arena: Estadio Obras Sanitarias; Referees: Julio Anaya (PAN), Johnny Batista (PUR), Carlos Vélez (COL)

17 April 2025	Boca Juniors (Argentina)	81–58	(Brazil) Flamengo	Buenos Aires, Argentina
21:40	Scoring by quarter: 19–9, 25–18, 17–14, 20–17
	Pts: Cuello 16; Rebs: Cáffaro 10; Asts: Smith 5	Boxscore	Pts: Deodato 15; Rebs: dos Santos 10; Asts: Negrete 2	Arena: Estadio Obras Sanitarias; Referees: Roberto Vázquez (PUR), Carlos Peralta (ECU), Orlando Varela (HON)

=== Third place game ===
18 April 2025	Flamengo (Brazil)	65–94	(Uruguay) Nacional	Buenos Aires, Argentina
17:40	Scoring by quarter: 16–23, 10–31, 17–22, 22–18
	Pts: Johnson 15; Rebs: Lugarini 7 Asts: Deodato 4	Boxscore	Pts: Thomas 20; Rebs: Thomas 10; Asts: Mendez 6	Arena: Estadio Obras Sanitarias; Referees: Johnny Batista (PUR), Krishna Domínguez (MEX), Nicolás Flores (PAR)

=== Final ===
18 April 2025	Boca Juniors (Argentina)	86–72	(Brazil) Sesi Franca	Buenos Aires, Argentina
21:40	Scoring by quarter: 31–28, 16–10, 19–15, 20–19
	Pts: Scala 18; Rebs: Scala 6 Asts: Scala 5	Boxscore	Pts: Lucas 17; Rebs: Lucas 7 Asts: Georginho 5	Arena: Estadio Obras Sanitarias; Referees: Roberto Vázquez (PUR), Julio Anaya (PAN), Carlos Peralta (ECU)

=== MVP ===
Player	Team
(Argentina) Francisco Cáffaro	(Argentina) Boca Juniors

==== All-Tournament Team ====
Player	Team
(Argentina) Francisco Cáffaro	(Argentina) Boca Juniors
(Argentina) Santiago Scala	(Argentina) Boca Juniors
(Brazil) Georginho	(Brazil) Sesi Franca
(United States) Connor Zinaich	(Uruguay) Nacional
(Brazil) Lucas	(Brazil) Sesi Franca
