= Cavell Johnson =

Basketball player

Bangui Sporting Club
- Position: Assistant coach
- League: Basketball Africa League

Personal information
- Born: March 28, 1985 (age 41) Fort Washington, Maryland
- Listed height: 6 ft 8.75 in (2.05 m)
- Listed weight: 230 lb (104 kg)

Career information
- High school: Notre Dame Academy (Middleburg, Virginia)
- College: James Madison (2003–2006); UMBC (2007–2008)
- NBA draft: 2008: undrafted
- Playing career: 2008–2017
- Coaching career: 2018–present

Career history

Playing
- 2011–2012: Beltway Bombers
- 2012–2013: Saint John Mill Rats
- 2013–2015: Brampton A's
- 2015–2016: Salon Vilpas Vikings
- 2016: MAFC
- 2016: Jianghuai Lightning
- 2016: Promitheas Patras
- 2016–2017: KW Titans

Coaching
- 2018–2021: KW Titans
- 2024–present: Bangui Sporting Club (assistant)

Career highlights
- As player: * 2× NBL Canada All-Defence Team (2014, 2015): All-NBL Canada Third Team (2015); NBL Canada Defensive Player of the Year (2014); NBL Canada All-Star (2014); NBL Canada Slam Dunk Champion (2014); NBL Canada All-Defence Second Team (2013); All-NBL Canada Second Team (2015); APBL Finals MVP (2012); APBL champion (2012); Second-team All-APBL (2012); Third-team All-America East (2008)

Gordon Cavell Johnson (born March 28, 1985) is an American professional basketball coach and former player. At a height of 2.05 m (6'8¾"), he played at the power forward and center positions on the court. Johnson was named an NBL Canada All-Star in 2014, and won its Slam Dunk Contest the same season. He was often considered one of the top defenders in the league, having been named to two All-Defence Teams, and winning the NBL Canada Defensive Player of the Year Award. Johnson played college basketball at James Madison University, and the University of Maryland, Baltimore County. He then started his coaching career with KW Titans after he was appointed head coach in 2018.

== Early life ==
Johnson was born on March 28, 1985, and raised in Fort Washington, Maryland, and Temple Hills, Maryland. In seventh grade, he dunked his first basketball. In an interview in 2008, he said that it was his most memorable moment as an athlete.

== Collegiate career ==
Johnson initially competed at the NCAA Division I level with the James Madison Dukes, but chose to transfer to UMBC after three seasons. He claimed that he was unhappy with his previous school and felt that he would see more immediate success with the Retrievers. One of Johnson's teammates also transferred to the same team with him, making the process smoother in his opinion.

== Professional career ==
In 2011–2012, Johnson played with the Beltway Bombers in the American Professional Basketball League (ACPBL). The Bombers won the ACPBL championship and Johnson won the APBL Finals Most Valuable Player award.

In 2012–2013, Johnson joined the National Basketball League of Canada's (NBLC) Saint John Mill Rats. With the Mill Rats, he averaged 10.8 points, 6.0 rebounds, and 1.3 blocks per game.

Johnson then spent the next two years with the Brampton A's in the NBLC. In 2014, Johnson was selected to the All-NBLC Second Team after averaging 14.2 points, 6.2 rebounds and 1.5 blocks per game. He also won the Defensive Player of the Year Award and was selected to participate in the NBLC All-Star Game. In 2015, Johnson averaged 12.4 points, 6.7 rebounds, and was tops in the league with 1.6 blocks per game. He was an All-NBL Canada Third Team member that season and helped the A's reach the NBLC Semi Finals.

On August 3, 2015, Johnson signed a one-year contract with Salon Vilpas Vikings of the Finish League.

On August 1, 2016, Johnson signed with Promitheas Patras of the Greek Basket League. He was officially released from the team on November 28, 2016, in order to attend to personal matters in the States. He then signed with KW Titans in the NBLC.

== Coaching career ==
On February 25, 2018, the KW Titans parted ways with coach Serge Langis and named Johnson new head coach, a position he held until 2021.

On April 4, 2024, Johnson was revealed to be an assistant coach for Bangui Sporting Club of the Basketball Africa League (BAL).
