= Steven Conville =

- Born: July 20, 1973 (age 52); Toronto, Ontario, Canada
- Education: York University (B.A.); Wilfrid Laurier University (M.B.A.); Concordia University (Masters Diploma in Investment Management); Canadian Securities Institute (Canadian Investment Manager)

Steven George Conville (born 1973) is the Founder and CEO of Kronic Relief Jamaica and is a former IIROC (Investment Industry Regulatory Organization of Canada) advisor. Steven has twenty years of experience in the financial industry overseeing over $750 million in assets. He is a Certified Financial Planner Licensee (CFP), a Fellow of the Canadian Securities Institute (FCSI), and has a Canadian Investment Manager designation (CIM). Steven was licensed to sell securities in both Canada and the United States. Steven has appeared on Business News Network (BNN) as an advisor and formerly was vice president at Macquarie Private Wealth, which is part of Macquarie Group.

He attended York University, where he attained bachelor's degrees in both arts and education. He also received an MBA in finance from Wilfrid Laurier University and a postgraduate diploma in investment management from Concordia University. He owns the Moncton Miracles of the National Basketball League.

Conville served on the investment advisory committee for the Office of the Public Guardian and Trustee for the Ministry of the Attorney General of the Province of Ontario for two consecutive 2 year terms ending in 2006.
