= Mike Glover (basketball) =

American basketball player

Free agent
- Position: Power forward

Personal information
- Born: September 1, 1987 (age 38) Bronx, New York, U.S.
- Listed height: 6 ft 5 in (1.96 m)
- Listed weight: 215 lb (98 kg)

Career information
- High school: American Christian Academy (Aston, Pennsylvania)
- College: ASA College (2008–2009); USU Eastern (2009–2010); Iona (2010–2012)
- NBA draft: 2012: undrafted
- Playing career: 2012–present

Career history
- 2012–2013: Hacettepe Üniversitesi B.K.
- 2013–2014: Estudiantes Concordia
- 2014–2015: Halcones de Xalapa
- 2015–2016: Halifax Hurricanes
- 2016: GlobalPort Batang Pier
- 2017: Leones de Quilpué
- 2017: Halcones de Ciudad Obregón
- 2017: Panteras de Aguascalientes
- 2018: Halcones de Ciudad Obregón
- 2018: TNT KaTropa
- 2019: Cape Breton Highlanders
- 2019–2020, 2022: NSH Mountain Gold Timika
- 2023: Cangrejeros de Santurce

Career highlights
- IBL Foreign Player of the Year (2020); CIBACOPA champion (2017); NBL Canada Sixth Man of the Year (2016); 2× First-team All-MAAC (2011, 2012)

Michael Glover (born September 1, 1987) is an American professional basketball player. He played college basketball for Iona. His moniker is Optimus Prime.

Glover played for three high schools. His senior-year transcript from American Christian Academy (Aston, Pennsylvania) was voided, and he was ruled ineligible for NCAA Division I play. Glover, a top prospect, decided to sue the NCAA, but a judge dismissed the lawsuit and he did not fight it since his girlfriend had just given birth to a son, Mike Jr. Glover played for two different community colleges—ASA College in Brooklyn and the College of Eastern Utah. Glover enrolled at Iona, where, as a senior, he posted averages of 18.1 points and 9.1 rebounds per game. He was a first-team all-Metro Atlantic Athletic Conference selection both years at Iona.

In 2015, Glover signed with the Halifax Hurricanes of the National Basketball League of Canada (NBL).

In July 2016, Glover was signed by the GlobalPort Batang Pier of the Philippine Basketball Association for the Governors' Cup as a replacement for Dominique Sutton.
