= Anthony Stover =

American basketball player (born 1990)

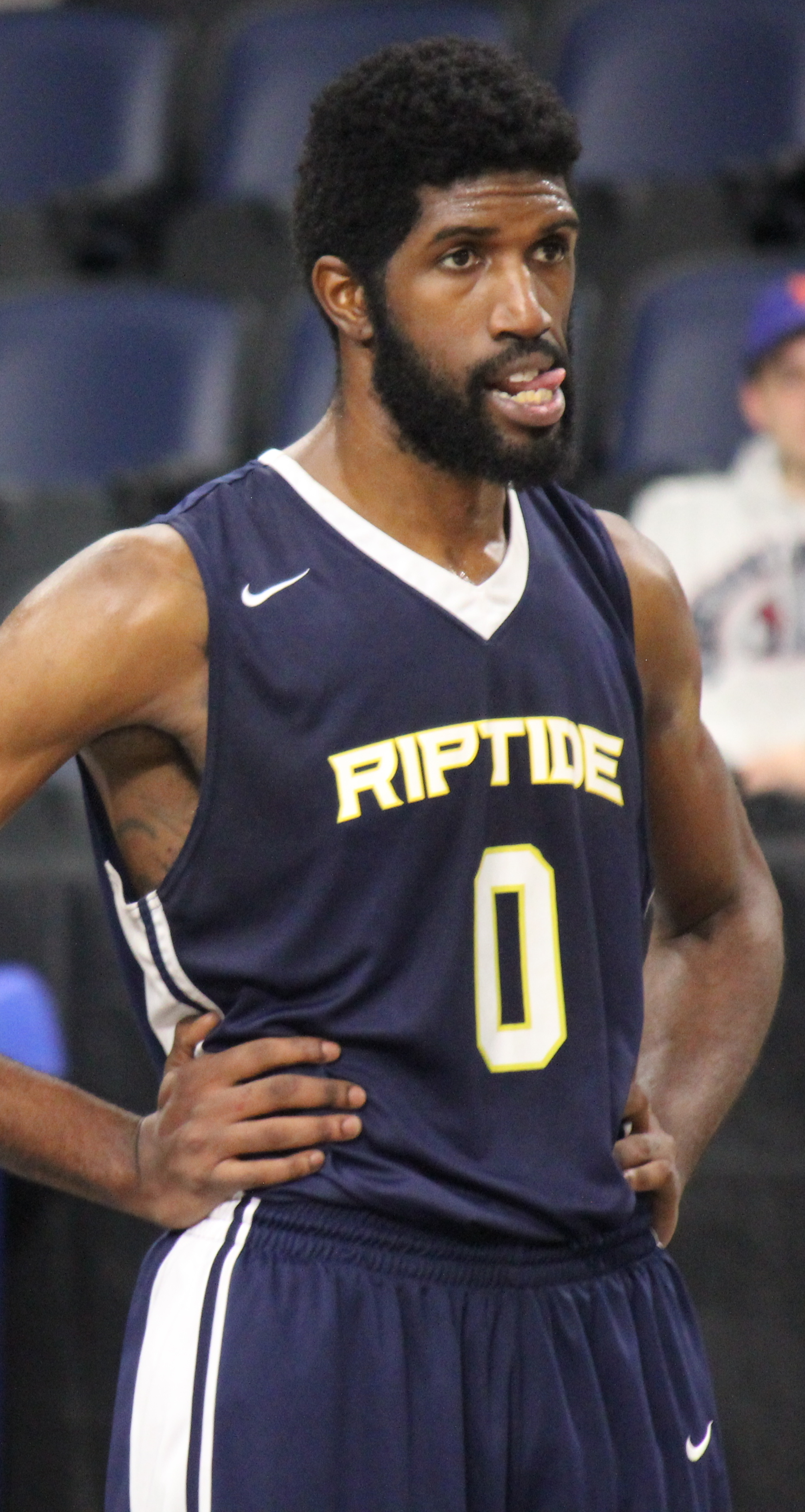
- Stover in 2017

Personal information
- Born: June 1, 1990 (age 36) Pasadena, California, U.S.
- Listed height: 6 ft 11 in (2.11 m)
- Listed weight: 230 lb (104 kg)

Career information
- High school: Windward School (Los Angeles, California)
- College: UCLA (2010–2012)
- NBA draft: 2012: undrafted
- Playing career: 2012–2020
- Position: Power forward / center

Career history
- 2012–2013: Los Angeles D-Fenders
- 2013–2014: Tokyo Cinq Rêves
- 2015: Rochester Razorsharks
- 2015–2018: Saint John Mill Rats/Riptide
- 2018: St. John's Edge
- 2018: Halifax Hurricanes
- 2019–2020: APOP Paphos

Career highlights
- Cypriot League All-Star (2019); NBL Canada Defensive Player of the Year (2016); NBL Canada blocks leader (2016); PBL champion (2015)

Anthony Thomas Stover (born June 1, 1990) is an American professional basketball player.

He competed for two seasons at UCLA before his dismissal from the program. Stover has played in multiple leagues during his pro career, including the NBA D-League.

== Early life and career ==
Stover was born on June 1, 1990, in Pasadena, California, to Craig and Rena Stover. His father played basketball collegiately for Pepperdine University and Stover's younger brother, Nick, played for South Alabama. He first attended Renaissance Academy near his hometown, averaging 10.6 points, 6.8 rebounds and 7.4 blocks per game as a junior. Stover then moved to Windward School in Los Angeles, where he played basketball and volleyball. He won the California Interscholastic Federation (CIF) Division V basketball title as a senior in 2009. In his final season, he earned all-state honors and averaged 14.0 points, 11.0 rebounds and 9.5 blocks per game. Stover left Windward as California's second-best center, as stated by Rivals.com. ESPN rated him the 33rd-best center of his class. He was ranked a four-star recruit by Scout.com and 247Sports.com.

College recruiting
Name	Hometown	School	Height	Weight	Commit date
Anthony Stover; C	Los Angeles, CA	Windward School	6 ft 9.25 in (2.06 m)	211.75 lb (96.05 kg)	Oct 3, 2009
Anthony Stover; C	Recruit ratings: Scout: Rivals: 247Sports: (88)				
Overall recruit ranking: Scout: 77, 12 (Center) Rivals: 144 (C) 247Sports: 90, 9 (C)
Note: In many cases, Scout, Rivals, 247Sports, On3, and ESPN may conflict in their listings of height and weight.; In these cases, the average was taken. ESPN grades are on a 100-point scale.; Sources: "UCLA 2009 Basketball Commitments". Rivals.; "2009 UCLA Commits". Scout.; "2009 Player Commitments – UCLA". ESPN.; "Scout.com Team Recruiting Rankings". Scout.; "2009 Team Ranking". Rivals.

== College career ==
Stover played two years in college for UCLA. He was negatively profiled in a February 2012 Sports Illustrated article, which stated that he partnered with Reeves Nelson to erode team unity as a freshman and did not take practices seriously, often shooting free throws one handed or fading away. As a sophomore, he posted averages of 0.5 points and 1.5 rebounds in 28 games, recording 8.4 minutes per contest. His 1.4 blocks per game were a team high. In August 2012, he was dismissed from the team for failing to meet eligibility requirements. Coach Ben Howland said in a statement. "We are very disappointed that Anthony has not met his academic requirements. We had high expectations for him, and we were looking forward to getting increased contributions from him during this coming season."

== Professional career ==
After departing UCLA, Stover joined the Los Angeles D-Fenders of the NBA D-League and subsequently played for a Japanese squad. In 2015, Stover played for the Rochester Razorsharks in the Premier Basketball League, helping the team to a 17–0 record and league title.

Stover signed with the Saint John Mill Rats of the National Basketball League of Canada (NBL) due to the possibility of winning a championship. Stover was named NBL Canada Player of the Week on February 7, 2016, after averaging 13 rebounds and six blocked shots in three games for the Mill Rats. At the end of the season he was named Defensive Player of the Year after setting a league single season record with 132 blocks. On October 6, 2016, Stover re-signed with the Mill Rats, since renamed the Saint John Riptide, for the following season.

On January 17, 2018, Stover was traded by the Riptide to the Niagara River Lions in exchange for a 1st-round pick in the 2018 NBLC Draft.

Stover failed to make an appearance for Niagara before being traded again on February 20, 2018, to the St. John's Edge for future considerations.

On September 12, 2018, Stover signed with the Halifax Hurricanes of the NBL Canada.

On September 10, 2019, Stover signed with APOP Paphos B.C. in the Cyprus Federation first division.

== Coaching career ==
Stover signed with Athletes Untapped as a private basketball coach on Mar 7, 2025.
