= Sudbury Community Arena =

Multi-purpose arena in Greater Sudbury, Canada

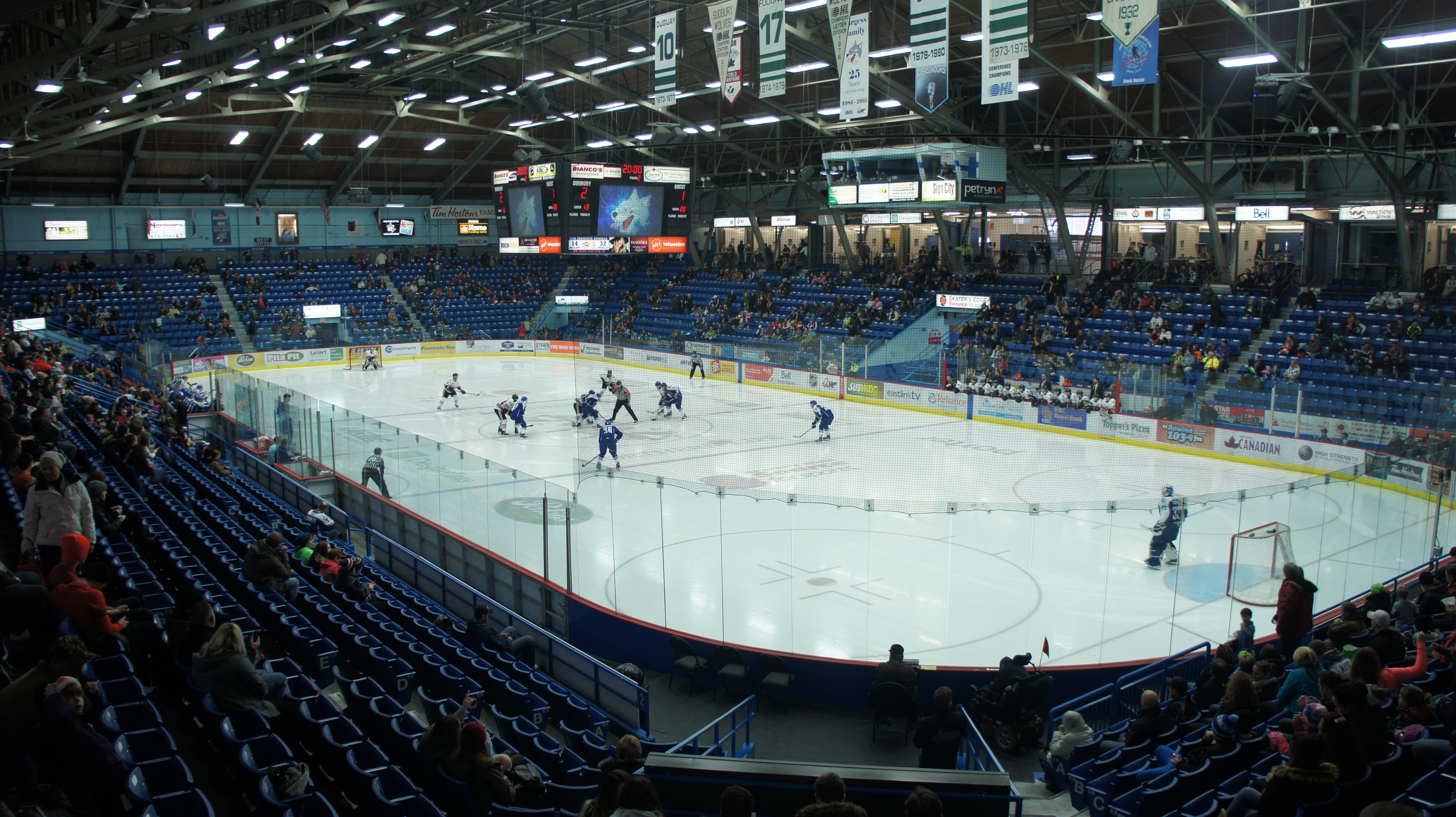

- Location within Ontario Location within Canada
- Address: 240 Elgin Street
- Location: Sudbury, Ontario, Canada
- Coordinates: 46°29′19″N 80°59′33″W
- Owner: City of Greater Sudbury
- Operator: City of Greater Sudbury
- Capacity: Hockey: 4,640
- Surface: Multi-surface

Construction
- Groundbreaking: 1950
- Opened: 1951
- Renovated: 2007
- Cost: $700,000 ($6.6 million in 2014 dollars)

Tenants
- Sudbury Wolves (OHL) (1972–present); Sudbury Five (BSL) (2018–present)

The Sudbury Community Arena is a multi-purpose arena in the downtown core of Greater Sudbury, Ontario, Canada. It was built in 1951, on the site of the former Central Public School, at a cost of $700,000. The approval and construction of the arena was overseen by Sudbury Mayor Bill Beaton. It is home to the Sudbury Wolves of the Ontario Hockey League and the Sudbury Five of the Basketball Super League.

It has an ice surface of 200' x 85', with a capacity of 4,640 seated, 5,100 standing and is wheelchair accessible.

== Notable events ==
During the summer of 2007, the arena underwent extensive renovations, which added 12 private boxes and a new club seating section, with padded seats and refreshments services along with new washrooms, concession stand and lounge. Seating was sacrificed to make way for the improvements. Standing room capacity was shrunk from 1,000 to 500, while seating capacity was dropped by 150. The new arena capacity, with standing room patrons, became 5,100, down from 5,750.

On November 5, 2015, a life size statue of Stompin' Tom Connors was unveiled on the grounds of the arena. The reason behind the statue was due to one of Connors' most famous songs, Sudbury Saturday Night.

The arena is featured extensively in the Canadian television show Shoresy, where it serves as home of the fictional Senior hockey Sudbury Bulldogs.

On September 29, 2024, the arena hosted the 2024 Kraft Hockeyville game featuring the Ottawa Senators and the Pittsburgh Penguins. Pittsburgh won the game 5-2.

Occasionally, other events, such as concerts or ice skating, have taken place at the arena; on May 29, 1998, country musician Shania Twain kicked-off her debut tour, the Come On Over Tour, at the arena.

== Future ==
In 2017, a plan known as the Kingsway Entertainment District, which included a new arena, hotel, and casino, was approved by city council. Amid rising costs, it was cancelled in 2022.

In 2024, city council tentatively approved a plan to construct a new arena within the block immediately east of the current structure. Construction began in 2025, with the new building scheduled to open in 2028.

== Gallery ==
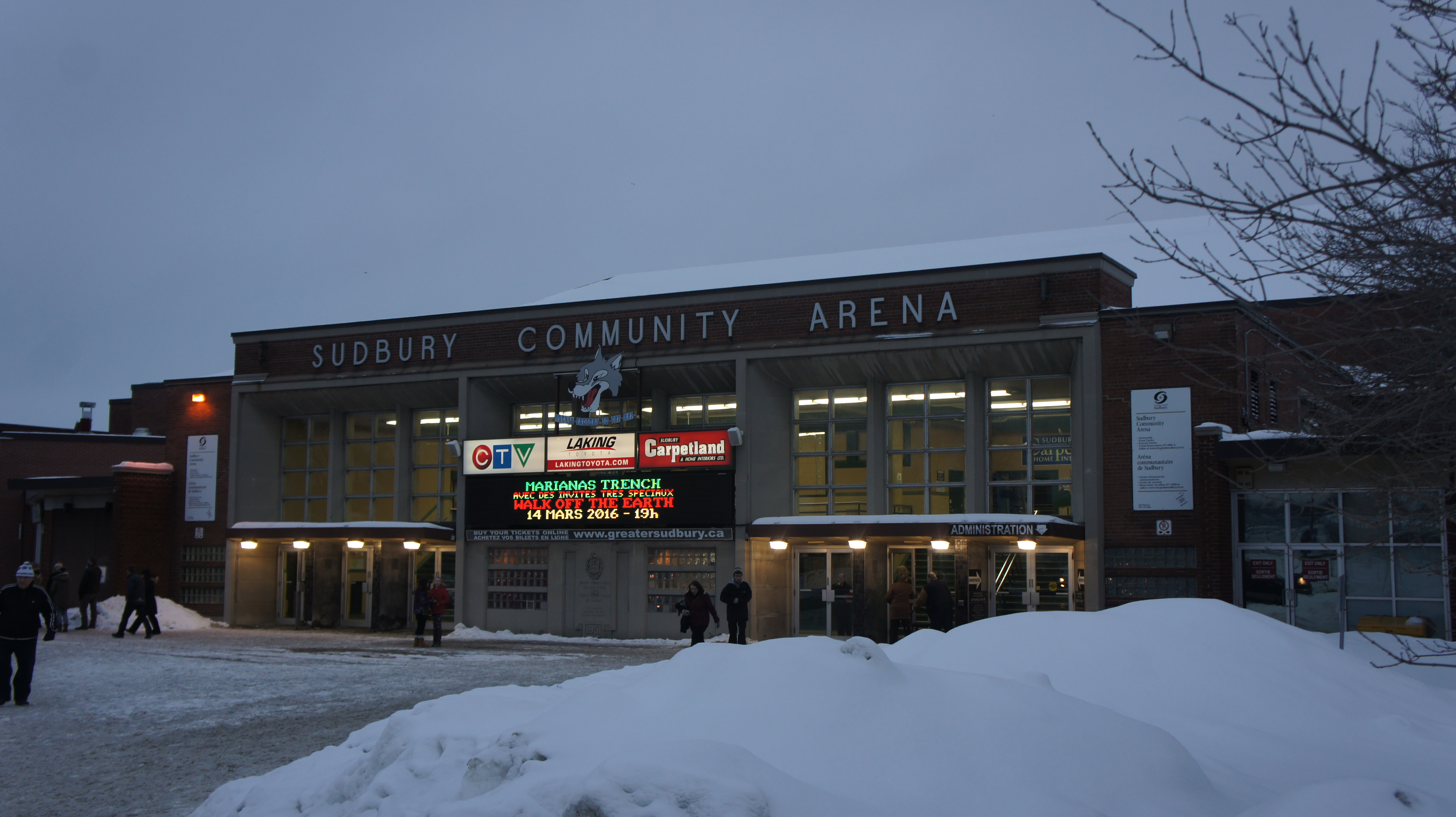
Exterior

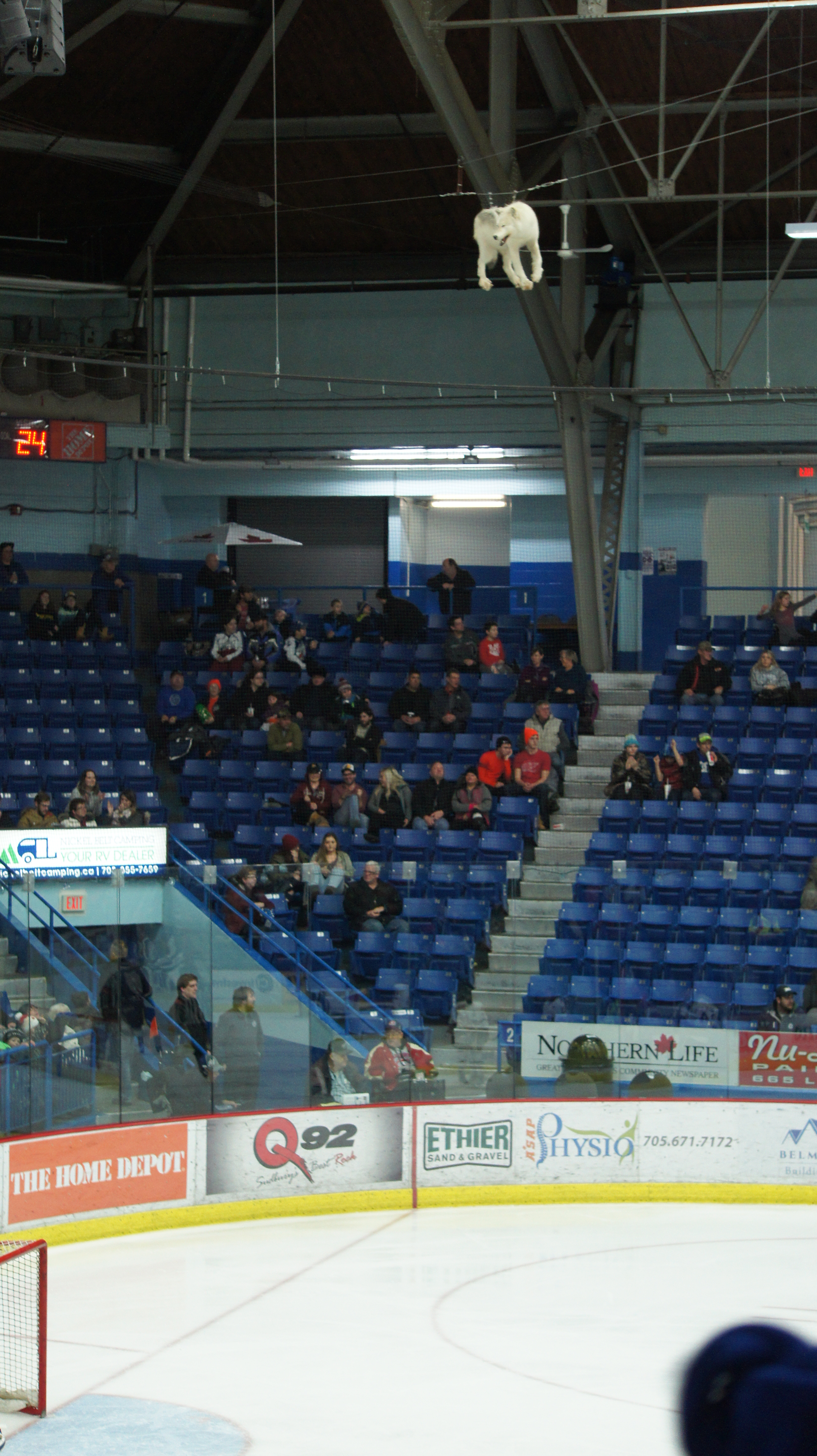
Sudbury Wolves Goal Celebration

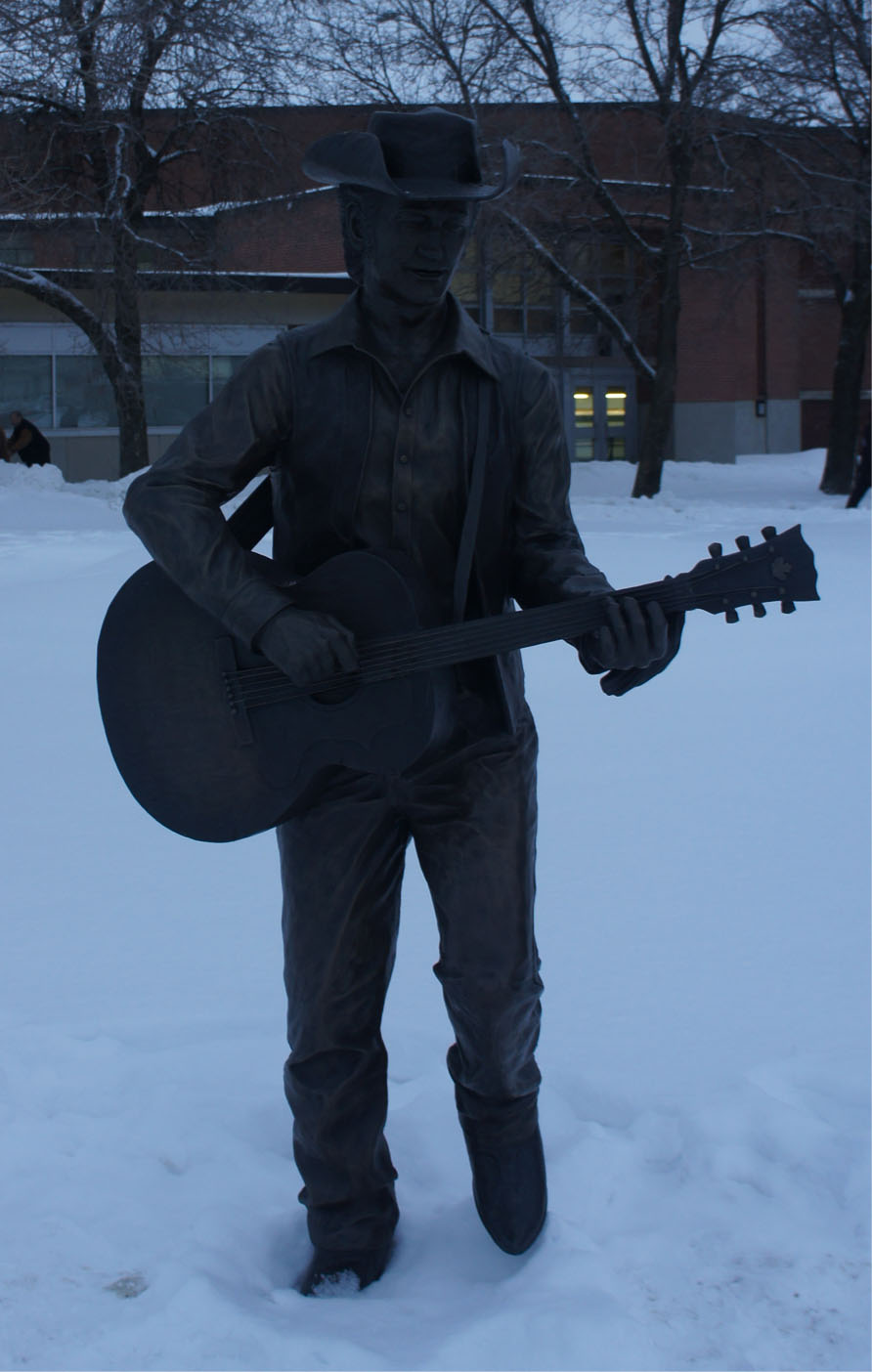
Statue of Stompin' Tom Connors
