= Shane Gibson (basketball) =

American basketball player

Free agent
- Position: Shooting guard / point guard

Personal information
- Born: January 5, 1990 (age 35) Killingly, Connecticut, U.S.
- Listed height: 6 ft 2 in (1.88 m)
- Listed weight: 181 lb (82 kg)

Career information
- High school: Killingly (Killingly, Connecticut)
- College: Sacred Heart (2008–2013)
- NBA draft: 2013: undrafted
- Playing career: 2013–present

Career history
- 2014–2015: Idaho Stampede
- 2015: Recanati
- 2015–2016: Halifax Hurricanes
- 2016–2017: Beroe
- 2017–2018: AEK Larnaca
- 2018: Bonn
- 2018–2019: Busan KT Sonicboom
- 2019: AEK Larnaca
- 2019–2020: Cibona
- 2021: Szolnoki Olajbányász
- 2021–2022: Mladost Zemun
- 2022: Fraser Valley Bandits
- 2022: Defensor Sporting
- 2023: TED Ankara Kolejliler
- 2023: Vancouver Bandits
- 2023: Edmonton Stingers
- 2023–2024: Al-Naft

Career highlights
- All-CEBL Second Team (2022); Cypriot League champion (2018); Cypriot Cup winner (2018); Cypriot Super Cup winner (2017); Cypriot League All-Star (2017); Balkan League MVP (2017); Balkan League champion (2017); Bulgarian Cup winner (2017); NBL Canada champion (2016); First-team All-NEC (2012, 2013); Second-team All-NEC (2011)

Shane Gibson (born January 5, 1990) is an American professional basketball player who last played for Al-Naft of the Iraqi Basketball Premier League (IBL). He played college basketball for Sacred Heart.

== College career ==
He played college basketball for Sacred Heart, where he was a three-time All-Northeast Conference selection. In his junior season, Gibson averaged 22.0 points per game, fourth in the nation. He scored 21.6 points per game as a senior, ninth in NCAA Division I. Gibson finished his career with 2,079 points, the most in Sacred Heart's Division I years and eighth highest in school history overall.

== Professional career ==
Gibson went undrafted in the 2013 NBA draft, though he played for the Sacramento Kings in the Summer League. He did not play during the 2013–14 season. Gibson signed with the Idaho Stampede of the NBA D-League in 2014, where in 50 games he was averaging 26.5 minutes per game, 12.5 points per game, while shooting 44.7% from the floor, 39.8% from three-point range and 87.1% at the foul line. In 2015, he played for Basket Recanati of the Italian Series A2 league before joining Halifax Hurricanes of NBL Canada.

On August 10, 2017, he joined AEK Larnaca of the Cypriot Division A. Gibson signed with Cibona on August 24, 2019.

In February 2021, Gibson joined Szolnoki Olajbányász of the Hungarian League.

In May 2022, Gibson signed with the Fraser Valley Bandits of the Canadian Elite Basketball League. However, he was released on June 30, 2023.

On July 1, 2023, Gibson signed with the Edmonton Stingers of the Canadian Elite Basketball League.
