= Logan Stutz =

American basketball player and manager

Sudbury Five
- Title: Head coach

Personal information
- Born: May 27, 1988 (age 38) Blue Springs, Missouri, U.S.
- Listed height: 6 ft 9 in (2.06 m)
- Listed weight: 225 lb (102 kg)

Career information
- High school: Plaza Heights (Blue Springs, Missouri)
- College: Butler County CC (2007–2008); Washburn (2008–2011)
- NBA draft: 2011: undrafted
- Playing career: 2011–2018
- Position: Power forward / center
- Number: 3
- Coaching career: 2018–present

Career history

Playing
- 2011: BG Topstar
- 2012: WBC Wels
- 2012–2013: ETB Wohnbau Baskets
- 2013: LF Basket
- 2013–2014: BC Balkan Botevgrad
- 2014–2015: Baunach Young Pikes
- 2015: ETB Wohnbau Baskets
- 2015–2016: Niagara River Lions
- 2016: Cyberdyne Ibaraki Robots
- 2016–2017: Niagara River Lions
- 2017–2018: Windsor Express

Coaching
- 2018–2025: Sudbury Five

Career highlights
- NBL Canada Most Valuable Player (2016); NBL Canada scoring champion (2016); First-team All-MIAA (2011)

Logan Patrick Stutz (born May 27, 1988) is an American retired professional basketball player and former professional head coach. He played the power forward and center positions during his playing career. He was the head coach and general manager for the Sudbury Five of the National Basketball League of Canada (NBLC). In 2021, he also accepted a temporary role as director of player development for the Boston College Eagles.

Stutz played for the Windsor Express and the Niagara River Lions of the NBLC, being named Most Valuable Player (MVP) in 2016. He competed with Butler County Community College and then Washburn University at the collegiate level. He played high school basketball for Plaza Heights Christian Academy in Blue Springs, Missouri.

== Early life ==
Logan was born on May 27, 1988, in Blue Springs, Missouri, to Valerie and Bill Stutz. He grew up playing sports in his backyard with his siblings; an older brother, a younger brother Garrett and a younger sister. Stutz later attended the small private school Plaza Heights Christian Academy in his hometown, where he played high school basketball as a point guard and graduated in 2007. His father was the head coach, and the team faced about three losses in Logan's entire career with Plaza Heights.

== College career ==
Stutz first attended Butler County Community College in El Dorado, Kansas, where he played college basketball for the Grizzlies for one season in the National Junior College Athletic Association (NJCAA). He believed that he could compete in the NCAA Division I, but he instead played at a lower level so that he could develop as a player and receive more offers. With the team, Stutz averaged 13.5 points and 5.2 rebounds per game, shooting about .480 from the field. His season drew attention of more high-level programs, but he chose to continue playing basketball in Kansas after meeting his future wife.

Starting in his sophomore year, Stutz attended Washburn University in Topeka, Kansas. He played basketball with the Ichabods at the NCAA Division II level. By the end of the season, he was averaging 5.1 points and 3.3 rebounds in 29 games. Stutz saw improvement as a junior, with averages of 11.3 points, five rebounds, and one steal per game. He carried Washburn to an appearance at the MIAA Tournament, putting up 23 points. Stutz developed into the Ichabods' leader during his senior season, averaging 20.0 points and 7.1 rebounds, both team-highs. He earned first-team All-MIAA honors in addition to first team All-NABC accolades. Stutz also led the MIAA in scoring.

== Professional career ==
Stutz began playing professional basketball with BG Topstar Leitershofen/Stadtbergen of the ProA, the second-best basketball league in Germany. He displayed prowess as both a scorer and as a rebounder with the team. Initially, he had trouble transitioning from the college level, but he eventually adapted. Following his time with Topstar, Stutz remarked, "It was a pretty smooth transition, especially because I got a little time in Germany my first year out." He finished off his season with WBC Wels of the Austrian Basketball League. For the next season, Stutz would return to the ProA to compete with ETB Wohnbau Baskets, where he averaged a team-high 20 points and eight rebounds. He was later named Most Valuable Player, after the season concluded. On June 15, 2013, Stutz signed with LF Basket of the Basketligan in Sweden.

== Coaching career ==
On August 9, 2018, Stutz was named the first head coach and general manager of the Sudbury Five, an expansion team in the National Basketball League of Canada (NBLC). In 2021, he left the Five to become the director of player development for the Boston College Eagles men's basketball program. Stutz returned to Sudbury and was both the Head Coach and General Manager of The Sudbury Five. His 2025 squad won the BSL Championship and he was named Coach of the Year. Stutz announced his resignation on November 26, 2025.
