= Brandan Kearney =

American basketball player (born 1993)

Brandan Dion Kearney (born March 1, 1993) is an American professional basketball player for the Montcon Miracles of the National Basketball League of Canada. He played college basketball at Michigan State University, Arizona State University and University of Detroit.

== Early life ==
Kearney was born on March 1, 1993, in Southfield Michigan to parents Derrick and Lea Hall-Kearney. He attended the Detroit Schooling system, all the way through his senior year of high school as he led his Detroit Southeastern team to two city championship appearances his sophomore year and winning it his senior year of 2011. Kearney then went on to lead his team to the Michigan Class A State Championship game. As a sophomore, he was selected to represent the United States as a member of the USA Developmental men's (16U) team winning the Gold Medal in the F.I.B.A. America's Tournament (2009). His junior year, he competed for the USA (17) in the 1st ever 3 on 3 Youth Olympic Games in Singapore. He was selected and participated in the NBA top 100 camp for upcoming top 100 seniors in the country. He scored a career-high 33 points vs Chicago Julian his junior year. In November 2010 he signed a National Letter of Intent to play college basketball for Michigan State University.

Following his senior year, Kearney was named player of the year in Michigan's Class A by Bankhoops.com. He was named to the Detroit News and Detroit Free Press 1st team all city, all metro and all state teams. He also was an ESPN and rivals and scout top 100 ranked player.

== College career ==
In his freshman year, Kearney appeared in 34 contest, averaging 9.6 minutes, Played double-figure minutes in 10 of the seasons final 12 games averaging 13.1 minutes. His MSU team advancing to the NCAA tournament sweet 16 losing to Louisville. In his sophomore year, he played in 10 games for Michigan State before transferring midseason averaging 20 minutes per game.

After sitting out from transferring Kearney played in 19 games for Arizona State University in his junior year averaging 6.5 minutes per game. Kearney appeared in all 33 games for Detroit in his senior year starting 13 averaging 6.3, 2.2 rebs, and 2.7 assists per game. He received the Larry Doyle Most Dedicated Titan Award.

== Professional career ==
After going undrafted in the 2015 NBA draft Kearney was drafted 2nd overall pick by Moncton Miracles of the National Basketball League of Canada for the 2015–16. In 40 games for Moncton he averaged 10 points, 3.5 assists and 4 rebs per game and was 4th in the NBL of Canada in 3pt Fg Pct with a 46% accuracy. Kearney received all League Rookie honors.

In November 2016 he signed an offer sheet with the Windsor Express of the NBL of Canada playing in 10 games before being traded back to Moncton. He averaged 10 points per game for Windsor including a 16-point performance vs KW Waterloo Kitchener. He was invited to the 2016 NBA pro day in Miami where he participated and was invited to the NBA's Miami Heat summer mini camp. In October 2016, the Miami Heat's NBA D League Affiliate, Sioux Falls Skyforce invited Kearney to their Veterans training camp where he was the team's final cut before the regular season started.

As of Feb-2017-Currently for Moncton, Kearney has played in 20 games averaging 15 points, 5 rebs and 3 assists per game.
