= Moncton Miracles =

Former basketball team in Moncton, Canada

- Division: Atlantic Division
- League: NBL Canada
- Founded: 2011
- History: Moncton Miracles; 2011–2017
- Arena: Moncton Coliseum
- Location: Moncton, New Brunswick
- Team colours: Black, orange, gray, white
- Team manager: Brennan Bellemare
- Head coach: Paul Mokeski
- Ownership: Vacant
- Website: MiraclesBasketball.com
Home	Away

The Moncton Miracles were a Canadian professional basketball team in Moncton, New Brunswick. Established in 2011, they were a charter member of the National Basketball League of Canada (NBL). The Miracles played their home games at the Moncton Coliseum as a part of the league's Atlantic Division and were one of two New Brunswick teams in the league along with the Saint John Riptide. The team was founded and owned by Steven Conville but were now without an owner for three seasons. Their seasons in the NBL Canada had been highlighted by struggles, until the franchise was finally folded following the 2016–17 season when a new ownership decided to start a new franchise in Moncton called the Moncton Magic.

== History ==
The Miracles were founded in 2011 and made their debut in the 2011–12 season of the NBL (National Basketball League). The team was primarily established by Steven George Conville;Steven Conville, who was the vice president and portfolio manager for Macquarie Private Wealth, part of the Macquarie Group, at the time. A big basketball fan, Conville accepted an offer to start a professional team by Andre Levingston, who would be the co-founder of the NBL Canada.

Following a failure to establish an NBL Canada team based out of Kingston, Ontario, Conville decided to create one in Moncton. He targeted the city because of its rapid growth and tight-knit community. Despite not having visited the city before becoming the Miracles' owner, Conville gained a perspective of Atlantic Canada during business trips to Halifax, Nova Scotia and Prince Edward Island. He said, "So when I did my research on Moncton, I found out how much they loved basketball out there." At a press conference in August 2011, Conville was officially named team owner. He also announced his hiring of Norris "Bo" Bell as the first head coach for the Miracles. Bell ran a basketball academy in Atlanta, Georgia in the United States. A former player, he also had experience in the Continental Basketball Association (CBA) and in France and Switzerland. Bell faced the likes of Micheal Ray Richardson, Dražen Petrović, and Billy Knight during his playing career. He also became fluent in French through his years in Europe, which was part of the reason he drew Conville's attention.

The Miracles' nickname was inspired by the term Moncton Miracle, which referred to the city of Moncton's comeback from recession in the 1980s. Conville described it by saying that it "connects with Moncton's history and symbolizes the strength, courage and toughness that this city has shown over the years." The nickname was also chosen because "Miracle" is the same word in both French and English. Conville also commented on the team's logo, "Our team logo is meant to embody the strength that comes through when you rise above... the player in the logo carrying the ball is not wallowing in the past. He's heading towards the future and he's doing it ferociously."

After three seasons of operations under the league management and without an owner, the NBL Canada sold a new franchise to three local business to play as the Moncton Magic.

== Final roster ==
Note: Flags indicate national team eligibility at FIBA-sanctioned events. Players may hold other non-FIBA nationalities not displayed.

Moncton Miracles roster
Players
Coaches

Pos.	No.	Nat.	Name	Ht.	Wt.	Age
F	5	(United States)	Beaty, Tydran	2.01 m (6 ft 7 in)	215 lb (98 kg)
C	30	(United States)	Creekmore, Will	2.05 m (6 ft 9 in)	260 lb (120 kg)	36 – 9 April 1989
G	13	(Canada)	Gibson, Gary	1.92 m (6 ft 4 in)	205 lb (93 kg)	38 – 1 December 1986
C	33	(United States)	Granado, Tom	2.08 m (6 ft 10 in)	260 lb (120 kg)	36 – 4 November 1988
F	2	(Canada)	Jeanty, Cordell	1.98 m (6 ft 6 in)	230 lb (100 kg)	45 – 1 October 1979
G	55	(United States)	Justice, James	1.78 m (5 ft 10 in)	165 lb (75 kg)	36 – 12 January 1989
F	10	(United States)	Kearney, Brandan	2.01 m (6 ft 7 in)	190 lb (86 kg)	32 – 1 March 1993
F	44	(United States)	Martin, Mike	2.03 m (6 ft 8 in)	230 lb (100 kg)	40 – 28 February 1985
F	22	(Canada)	Smith, Ryan	1.90 m (6 ft 3 in)	205 lb (93 kg)
G	23	(United States)	Strickland, Dexter	1.91 m (6 ft 3 in)	190 lb (86 kg)	34 – 1 October 1990
G	42	(United States)	Tate, Tyrrel	1.96 m (6 ft 5 in)	195 lb (88 kg)	33 – 12 February 1992
G	7	(United States)	Vanzant, Shawn	1.85 m (6 ft 1 in)	171 lb (78 kg)	36 – 19 October 1988

Head coach

- (United States) Paul Mokeski

Assistant coach(es)

- (Montenegro) Martin Knezevic

Legend

- (C) Team captain
- Injured

- Roster
- Transactions
Updated: April 13, 2016

== Season-by-season record ==
Season	Division	Regular season						Playoffs	Head coach	Awards
Season	Division	Finish	Games	Wins	Losses	Pct.	GB	Playoffs	Head coach	Awards
Moncton Miracles
2011–12	—	7th	36	9	27	.250	19	Did not qualify	Norris Bell (0–7); Mike Evans (9–20)	—
2012–13	Atlantic	3rd	40	20	20	.500	6	Won First Round (Mill Rats), 2–1; Lost Semifinals (Lightning), 1–3	Ricky Benitez (8–9); Serge Langis (1–1); Dennis Truax (11–10)	Devin Sweetney (MVP); Isaac Butts (RoY); Kim Blanco (EoY)
2013–14	Atlantic	3rd	40	14	26	.350	9	Lost First Round (Storm), 1–3	Dennis Truax	—
2014–15	Atlantic	4th	32	8	24	.250	12	Lost First Round (Rainmen), 1–3	Serge Langis	—
2015–16	Atlantic	3rd	40	15	25	.275	14	Lost First Round (Mill Rats), 1–3	Serge Langis	—
2016–17	Atlantic	4th	40	15	25	.375	12	Lost First Round (Hurricanes), 0–3	Paul Mokeski	—
