= Erik Copes =

American basketball player (born 1993)

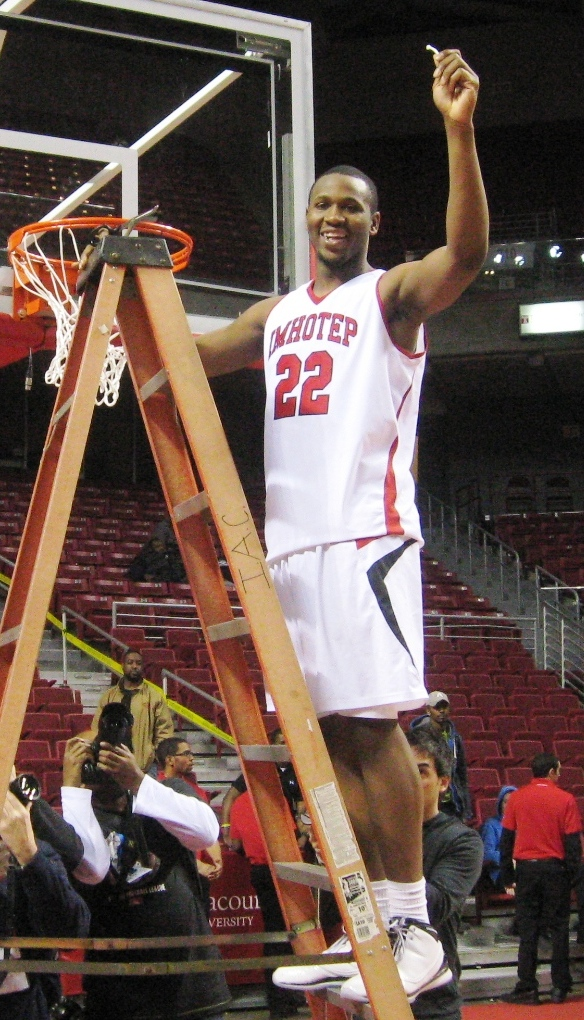
- Copes in February 2011, after winning his third PBL title

Bashkimi
- Position: Power forward / center
- League: Kosovo Superleague; Liga Unike

Personal information
- Born: January 29, 1993 (age 33) Philadelphia, Pennsylvania, U.S.
- Listed height: 6 ft 9 in (2.06 m)
- Listed weight: 250 lb (113 kg)

Career information
- High school: Imhotep Charter (Philadelphia, Pennsylvania)
- College: George Mason (2011–2014)
- NBA draft: 2015: undrafted
- Playing career: 2015–present

Career history
- 2015–2016: Orangeville A's
- 2017: America F.B.C.
- 2017–2019: Teuta Durrës
- 2019–2020: BC Rustavi
- 2021–2022: Rapid Bucharest
- 2023: Hübner Nyíregyháza BS
- 2023–present: Bashkimi
- 2024: →Elitzur Yavne

Career highlights
- Albanian Supercup winner (2018)

Erik Copes (born January 29, 1993) is an American professional basketball player for Bashkimi of the Kosovo Superleague. Copes played four years of college basketball with the George Mason Patriots but left midway through his senior season for personal reasons. He attended Imhotep Institute Charter High School and helped his team win three consecutive Philadelphia Public League (PPL) titles.

== High school career ==
Copes attended Imhotep Institute Charter High School, where he was a member of the Panthers' varsity basketball team for four years. He closed out his sophomore season in 2009 by bringing Imhotep its third PPL Class AA title in four years. Copes helped his team with 11 rebounds and 7 blocks as the Panthers defeated Pittsburgh Northern Catholic, 75–67, in double-overtime. As a senior, he led the team to their third consecutive Class AA title, adding 13 rebounds in a 33-point win over Greensburg Central Catholic.

Only as a high school sophomore, Copes orally committed to play at the college level with the George Washington Colonials. At the time, he was considered one of the best recruits to be spotted by the Colonials' head coach Karl Hobbs. However, upon request in May 2011, Copes was released from his National Letter of Intent and committed to George Mason. One factor that affected his decision was that his uncle was a member of their coaching staff. His decision was considered a "huge commitment" for the Patriots, who competed in the Colonial Athletic Association (CAA). Copes had been rated the sixth-best prospect of his class in the country at the center position.

== Collegiate career ==
Copes played all 27 of his team's games as a freshman, although he saw limited playing time. He recorded 51 blocked shots, which was the fifth-highest season total in school history. His shot-blocking average, of 1.9 per game, was also the third-highest in program history. Copes finished off his first season at the collegiate level averaging 3.3 points and 3.7 rebounds. As a sophomore, the big man led the Patriots in rebounding, grabbing 6.0 per game, and started in all 34 of his team's games. He also averaged 1.1 blocks, putting him ninth in the CAA under that category. On February 23, 2013, Copes made a 12-foot jump shot with 0.5 seconds left to defeat William & Mary. He said that it was his first game-winning shot of his life. On March 19, Copes made another game-winner, recording a tip-in shot with 0.6 seconds in regulation to push George Mason past the College of Charleston at the College Basketball Invitational (CBI). He also put up a career-high 14 points. In his junior season, Copes played 25 games but appeared on the starting lineup in only 14 of them. On February 12, 2013, he tied his career-best rebounding total vs UMass on with 15 rebounds against Cady Lalanne. Copes also recorded a season-high of 12 points. As a senior, he suited up for four games but was not a part of the Patriots' starting lineup. But on December 17, 2015, he left the program for personal reasons. George Mason head coach Paul Hewitt respected the decision, saying, "I understand he needs to devote more time to other matters in his life that are more important than basketball."

== Professional career ==
On November 28, 2015, Copes was selected first overall by the Niagara River Lions at the 2015 NBL Canada draft. However, on December 7, he was released by the team, along with their two other draft picks. Head coach Ken Murray said, "A lot of it has to deal with team chemistry, and I've released some guys just because I think it could alter our chemistry." However, Copes was later acquired by the Orangeville A's and remained in the Canadian league.

In January 2017, Copes signed with America F.B.C. in Paraguay. He averaged 18.5 points and 13.7 rebounds per game in Paraguay before heading to Mongolia in March 2017. He averaged 25 points and 13 rebounds in the Mongolia Basketball Association.

In October 2017, Copes moved to Albania to play for Teuta Durrës. Copes flourished in his first season playing 1st Division European basketball. Most impressive were his games against bitter rival SK Tirana. SK Tirana has long been the best team in Albania and participate in the Balkan League. Copes led Tirana to many victories over SK Tirana, but none more important than winning Teuta's first Supercup title in 60 years over Tirana. Copes nearly led Teuta Durrës to a Superliga title. Teuta swept Partizani to reach the Playoff Finals against SK Tirana. In a crucial Game 4 win, Copes led all scorers with 23 points, 11 rebounds, and 5 blocks. Unfortunately, Teuta fell just short in the final. Despite this result, Copes was made MVP of the Albania Superliga.

== Personal life ==
Copes was brought up in Philadelphia, Pennsylvania and was raised by his mother, Rochetta Copes. He grew up on 56th St and Jefferson St in West Philadelphia. He has three older siblings, Antoine, Keisha, and Sharae. His uncle, Roland Houston, was an assistant coach with the George Mason Patriots men's basketball team in the NCAA Division I and has experience playing college basketball with the Rhode Island Rams. Houston also played professional hoops for 13 seasons overseas. While attending George Mason University, Copes majored in integrated studies, although he had originally planned to major in criminal justice.
