= Minja Popović =

Serbian footballer (born 1983)

Personal information
- Full name: Minja Popović
- Date of birth: January 23, 1983 (age 43)
- Place of birth: Pristina, SFR Yugoslavia
- Height: 1.79 m (5 ft 10 in)
- Position: Defender

Senior career*
Years	Team	Apps	(Gls)
2001–2002	Jedinstvo Ub	28	(4)
2004	Spartak Sumy	9	(1)
2005–2007	BASK	57	(4)
2007	Zakarpattya Uzhhorod	2	(0)
2008	Čukarički	6	(0)
2008–2009	Otopeni	4	(0)
2010	Banat Zrenjanin	4	(0)
2010–2011	Voždovac	17	(4)
2011	Slavija Beograd	8	(0)
2012	Radnički Niš	9	(1)
Total		144	(14)
- * Club domestic league appearances and goals

Minja Popović (Serbian Cyrillic: Миња Поповић; born January 23, 1983) is a Serbian former footballer.

== Career ==
Popović played for FK BASK in the Serbian First League in the 2005–06 and 2006–07 seasons. He was then transferred to Ukrainian Premier League club Zakarpattya Uzhhorod, where he only appeared in two league matches.
