= Kenyon McNeail =

American basketball player (born 1991)

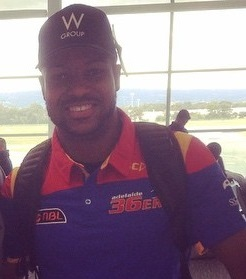

No. 21 – Kangoeroes Willebroek
- Position: Point guard
- League: Belgian Basketball League

Personal information
- Born: March 22, 1991 (age 35) Memphis, Tennessee
- Listed height: 185 cm (6 ft 1 in)
- Listed weight: 84 kg (185 lb)

Career information
- High school: Conway (Conway, Arkansas)
- College: Louisiana Tech (2010–2014)
- NBA draft: 2014: undrafted
- Playing career: 2014–present

Career history
- 2014–2015: U.D. Oliveirense
- 2015: Adelaide 36ers
- 2016–2017: Kožuv
- 2017–present: Kangoeroes Willebroek

Career highlights
- Conference USA Sixth Man of the Year (2014)

Kenyon Tarrell McNeail (born March 22, 1991) is an American professional basketball player who currently plays for Kangoeroes Willebroek of the Belgian Basketball League. He played college basketball for Louisiana Tech University.

== High school career ==
McNeail attended Conway High School in Conway, Arkansas where he was deemed a three-star recruit. As a senior in 2009–10, he averaged 15.3 points, 4.4 rebounds and 4.3 assists while leading Conway to a state title.

== College career ==
As a freshman at Louisiana Tech in 2010–11, McNeail played in 32 games and had 30 starting assignments. He averaged 8.7 points, 2.8 rebounds, 2.4 assists and 29.4 minutes per game, while shooting 35.5 percent from the field and 34.4 percent from three-point range, the second best ever by a Tech freshman.

As a sophomore in 2011–12, McNeail played in all 34 games and had 25 starting assignments. He averaged 6.8 points, 2.2 assists, 2.1 rebounds and 1.0 steals in 21.8 minutes per game. On January 14, 2012, he scored a season-high 19 points on 7-of-10 shooting including 5-for-6 from three-point range against Utah State. His three-point performance against the Aggies tied him for the fourth best mark in a game in program history.

As a junior in 2012–13, McNeail played in 33 games but made just one start. He totaled 232 points for an average of 7.0 points per game, registered 10 double-digit scoring games, and was the team's leading scorer in two games. He also ranked 10th in the WAC in three-point percentage with 35.7 percent. On January 12, 2013, he scored a career-high 34 points against UTSA.

As a senior in 2013–14, McNeail came off the bench in all 37 games, but still managed to total 406 points to average 11.0 points per game. He was subsequently named the Conference USA Sixth Man of the Year. On January 25, 2014, he scored a season-high 22 points against Marshall.

== Professional career ==
On September 16, 2014, McNeail signed with U.D. Oliveirense for the 2014–15 LPB season. In 25 games for Oliveirense, he averaged 19.4 points, 3.3 rebounds, 3.4 assists and 1.2 steals per game.

On July 30, 2015, McNeail signed with the Adelaide 36ers for the 2015–16 NBL season. After injuring his shoulder competing in the NBL Pre-season Blitz dunk contest, McNeail managed just 13 minutes of game time over the first two regular season games for the 36ers. On October 16, McNeail scored 10 points off the bench in 20 minutes as the 36ers lost 84–75 to Melbourne United. Three days later, he was released by the 36ers after it became apparent that his injured shoulder was not responding to treatment. In three games for the 36ers, he scored a total of 12 points.

In September 2016, McNeail signed with Macedonian club Kožuv for the 2016–17 season.
