= 2015–16 NBL Canada season =

- League: National Basketball League of Canada
- Sport: Basketball
- Duration: December 26, 2015 – April 30, 2016
- Games: 160 (40 per team)
- Teams: 8
- Total attendance: 187,939 through 94 Games (1,999 per game)
- TV partner(s): EastLink TV, The Score, Rogers Media

Draft
- Top draft pick: Erik Copes
- Picked by: Niagara River Lions

Regular Season
- Top seed: Halifax Hurricanes
- Top scorer: Logan Stutz (Niagara River Lions)

Playoffs

Finals
- Champions: Halifax Hurricanes
- Runners-up: London Lightning

NBL Canada seasons
- ← 2014–15 2016–17 →

The 2015–16 NBL Canada season was the fifth season of the National Basketball League of Canada (NBLC). The regular season began on December 26, 2015 and concluded on April 30, 2016. There were 40 total games played by each team, eight more than the previous year. The new expansion Niagara River Lions team are competing in their first season. The Halifax Hurricanes also began play, replacing the defunct Halifax Rainmen. During the offseason, the Mississauga Power folded to make way for Raptors 905 of the NBA Development League. Prior to the season, the league also enforced new policies to help improve its standard, including rules regarding sportsmanship, addressing the brawl that ended the 2015 NBL Canada Finals. The first regular season game featured the Island Storm and the Saint John Mill Rats.

== Transactions ==
=== Coaching changes ===
Coaching changes
Offseason
Team	2014–15 season	2015–16 season
Halifax Hurricanes		Hugo López
London Lightning	Carlos Knox	Kyle Julius
Niagara River Lions		Ken Murray
Orangeville A's	Dave Magley	Chris Thomas
Saint John Mill Rats	Julian King	Rob Spon
Windsor Express	Bill Jones	Tony Jones (interim)

- On May 7, 2015, the Saint John Mill Rats hired Rob Spon as head coach.
- On May 8, 2015, the NBL Canada suspended Windsor Express head coach Bill Jones for one season.
- On May 29, 2015, the NBL Canada hired Brampton A's head coach Dave Magley as league commissioner.
- On July 14, 2015, the Windsor Express hired Tony Jones as interim head coach, temporarily replacing his brother, Bill.
- On July 29, 2015, the London Lightning fired head coach Carlos Knox after one year with the team.
- On August 19, 2015, the London Lightning hired Kyle Julius as head coach.
- On February 12, 2016, the Moncton Miracles hired Paul Mokeski to replace Serge Langis.

== Preseason ==
=== Out-of-league ===
On October 23, 2015, Raptors 905 of the NBA D-League, who replaced the Mississauga Power earlier in the offseason, announced that they would be facing two NBL Canada teams—the Windsor Express and London Lightning—in their three-game preseason schedule. The team would visit the WFCU Centre to face the Express on the road and compete with the Lightning at their home arena, the Hershey Centre. On November 5, Raptors 905 defeated the Express, 117–114. Adrian Moss, who scored 38 points, helped Windsor make a comeback after facing an 18-point deficit at halftime. Raptors 905 picked up another win over the Lightning on November 9, after pulling off a 126–111 victory. Tyshawn Patterson, a draft combine addition, led London with 26 points. The Windsor Express played another preseason game against the Lima Express of the Midwest Professional Basketball Association (MPBA) on December 13 at the St. Clair College SportsPlex in Windsor, pulling off the 108–82 win. Maurice Bolden led Windsor with 24 points while Lima's Jody Hill put up a game-high 26 points.

November 5
7:30 pm

Recap

Raptors 905 117, Windsor Express 114

Hershey Centre, Mississauga, Ontario

November 9
7:30 pm

Recap

London Lightning 111, Raptors 905 126

WFCU Centre, Windsor, Ontario

December 13
7:30 pm

Recap

Windsor Express 108, Lima Express 82

St. Clair SportsPlex, Windsor, Ontario

=== In-league ===
On December 18, 2015, the Halifax Hurricanes and Island Storm competed in a preseason game at Centre 200 in Sydney, Nova Scotia, with the Hurricanes winning, 106–103. Centre 200 is expected to be the home of the future NBL Canada team, the Cape Breton Highlanders. On December 19, the London Lightning defeated the Windsor Express, 97–87, behind 19 points from Chad Posthumus and Stephen Maxwell. The Hurricanes also won their second preseason contest over the Moncton Miracles, that same day, pulling away for a 110–91 victory. On December 21, the Miracles defeated the Storm, 115–110, in a fundraising game at Crandall University. Moncton's James Justice led all scorers with 27 points. On December 23, the Saint John Mill Rats defeated the Miracles, 128–110, behind 33 points from Doug Herring, Jr. They set a franchise record for most fans at the Harbour Station, with an attendance of 6,646.

December 18
8:00 pm

Recap

Island Storm 103, Halifax Hurricanes 106

Centre 200, Sydney, Nova Scotia
Attendance: 1,100

December 19
7:00 pm

Recap

Windsor Express 87, London Lightning 97

Budweiser Gardens, London, Ontario
Attendance: 5,000+

December 19
7:00 pm

Recap

Moncton Miracles 91, Halifax Hurricanes 110

Scotiabank Centre, Halifax, Nova Scotia
Attendance: 2,000+

December 21
7:00 pm

Recap

Island Storm 110, Moncton Miracles 115

Crandall University, Moncton, New Brunswick

December 23
6:00 pm

Recap

Moncton Miracles 110, Saint John Mill Rats 128

Harbour Station, Saint John, New Brunswick
Attendance: 6,646

== Teams ==
2015-16 National Basketball League of Canada
Division	Team	City	Arena	Capacity
Atlantic	Halifax Hurricanes	Halifax, Nova Scotia	Scotiabank Centre	10,500
Atlantic	Island Storm	Charlottetown, Prince Edward Island	Eastlink Centre	4,000
Atlantic	Moncton Miracles	Moncton, New Brunswick	Moncton Coliseum	6,554
Atlantic	Saint John Mill Rats	Saint John, New Brunswick	Harbour Station	6,603
Central	London Lightning	London, Ontario	Budweiser Gardens	9,000
Central	Niagara River Lions	St. Catharines, Ontario	Meridian Centre	4,030
Central	Orangeville A's	Orangeville, Ontario	Athlete Institute	1,000
Central	Windsor Express	Windsor, Ontario	WFCU Centre	6,500

=== Map of teams ===
Atlantic Division Central Division

== Regular season ==
=== Standings ===
Atlantic Division
#	Team	W	L	PCT	GB	Div	GP
1	Halifax Hurricanes	29	11	0.725	0	14-7	40
2	Saint John Mill Rats	25	15	0.625	4	13-9	40
3	Moncton Miracles	15	25	0.375	14	10-13	40
4	Island Storm	14	26	0.370	15	7-15	40

Central Division
#	Team	W	L	PCT	GB	Div	GP
1	London Lightning	26	14	0.650	0	14-9	40
2	Windsor Express	21	19	0.525	5	15-10	40
3	Niagara River Lions	16	24	0.400	10	10-13	40
4	Orangeville A's	14	26	0.350	12	7-14	40

== Statistics ==
As of February 24, 2016.

=== Individual statistic leaders ===
Category	Player	Team	Statistic
Points per game	Logan Stutz	Niagara River Lions	23.8
Rebounds per game	Stephen Maxwell	London Lightning	12.7
Assists per game	Sammy Zeglinski	Niagara River Lions	8.8
Steals per game	Brandon Robinson	Windsor Express	2.8
Blocks per game	Anthony Stover	Saint John Mill Rats	3.9
Turnovers per game	Sammy Zeglinski	Niagara River Lions	4.3
Fouls per game	Gabe Freeman	Saint John Mill Rats	4.2
Fouls per game	Billy White	Halifax Hurricanes	4.2
Minutes per game	Brandon Robinson	Windsor Express	41.2
FG%	Mike Glover	Halifax Hurricanes	0.640
FT%	Corey Allmond	Saint John Mill Rats	0.923
3P%	Brandan Kearney	Moncton Miracles	0.519
Double-doubles	Stephen Maxwell	London Lightning	13
Triple-doubles	Anthony Stover	Saint John Mill Rats	1

=== Individual game highs ===
Category	Player	Team	Statistic
Points	Anthony Anderson	Saint John Mill Rats	51
Rebounds	Stephen Maxwell	London Lightning	22
Assists	Sammy Zeglinski	Niagara River Lions	18
Steals	Adrian Moss	Windsor Express	7
Blocks	Anthony Stover	Saint John Mill Rats	10
Three Pointers	Clinton Springer-Williams	Niagara River Lions	10

=== Team statistic leaders ===
Category	Team	Statistic
Points per game	Saint John Mill Rats	111.6
Rebounds per game	Niagara River Lions	50.8
Assists per game	Windsor Express	25.2
Steals per game	Halifax Hurricanes	10.6
Blocks per game	Saint John Mill Rats	5.9
Turnovers per game	Niagara River Lions	20.4
Fouls per game	Halifax Hurricanes	29.1
FG%	Halifax Hurricanes	0.486
FT%	Saint John Mill Rats	0.773
3FG%	London Lightning	0.376

=== Attendance ===
Team	Home Games	Average	Total
London Lightning	20	5,659	113,176
Island Storm	20	1,950	39,009
Halifax Hurricanes	20	1,929	38,581
Saint John Mill Rats	20	1,774	35,480
Moncton Miracles	20	1,545	30,896
Niagara River Lions	20	1,305	26,108
Windsor Express	20	1,262	25,249
Orangeville A's	20	341	6,822
League	160	1,971	315,321

== Awards ==
=== Players of the Week ===
Week	Player	Team	Ref.
Dec. 27	Doug Herring, Jr.	Saint John Mill Rats	
Dec. 27	Logan Stutz	Niagara River Lions	
Jan. 3	Justin Johnson	Halifax Hurricanes	
Jan. 10	Brandon Robinson	Windsor Express	
Jan. 17	Tyshawn Patterson	London Lightning	
Jan. 24	Mike Glover	Halifax Hurricanes	
Jan. 24	Stephen Maxwell	London Lightning	
Jan. 31	Nick Okorie	London Lightning	
Feb. 7	Anthony Stover	Saint John Mill Rats	
Feb. 14	Kyle Hunt	Halifax Hurricanes	
Feb. 21	Anthony Anderson	Saint John Mill Rats	
Feb. 28	Brian Addison	Island Storm	
Mar. 6	James Justice	London Lightning	

== Playoffs ==
Division Semifinals
1	Halifax	3
4	Island	0
Atlantic Division
2	Saint John	3
3	Moncton	1
1	London	3
4	Orangeville	0
Central Division
2	Windsor	3
3	Niagara	0

Division Finals
1	Halifax	4
2	Saint John	0
1	London	4
2	Windsor	2

NBL Canada Finals
A1	Halifax	4
C1	London	3

=== NBL Canada Finals ===
June 2
7:00 pm

Box score

London Lightning 115, Halifax Hurricanes 105
Scoring by quarter: 23–23, 25–21, 32–29, 35–32
Pts: Akeem Wright 25; Rebs: Stephen Maxwell 9 Asts: Ed Horton 6	Pts: Shane Gibson 18; Rebs: Kyle Hunt 9 Asts: Cliff Clinkscales 6
London leads series 1–0

Scotiabank Centre, Halifax
Attendance: 1,438

June 3
7:00 pm

Box score

London Lightning 119, Halifax Hurricanes 133
Scoring by quarter: 35–36, 28–30, 30–33, 28–34
Pts: Garrett Williamson 23; Rebs: Stephen Maxwell 7 Asts: Akeem Scott 6	Pts: Joel Friesen 28; Rebs: Renaldo Dixon, Mike Glover 6 each Asts: Cliff Clinkscales 9
Halifax ties series 1–1

Scotiabank Centre, Halifax
Attendance: 1,904

June 6
7:00 pm

Box score

Halifax Hurricanes 101, London Lightning 96
Scoring by quarter: 22–20, 19–18, 32–31, 28–27
Pts: Kyle Hunt, Justin Johnson 16 each Rebs: Mike Glover 7 Asts: Cliff Clinkscales 12	Pts: Akeem Scott 25; Rebs: Akeem Wright 13; Asts: Akeem Scott 12
Halifax leads series 2–1

Budweiser Gardens, London
Attendance: 2,964

June 8
7:00 pm

Box score

Halifax Hurricanes 99, London Lightning 98
Scoring by quarter: 21–21, 26–23, 25–27, 27–27
Pts: Shane Gibson 20; Rebs: Mike Glover 9 Asts: Cliff Clinkscales 7	Pts: Akeem Scott 26; Rebs: Akeem Wright 5 Asts: Akeem Scott, Akeem Wright 4 each
Halifax leads series 3–1

Budweiser Gardens, London
Attendance: 3,790

June 10
7:00 pm

Box score

Halifax Hurricanes 81, London Lightning 92
Scoring by quarter: 15–20, 19–28, 23–20, 24–24
Pts: Justin Johnson 20; Rebs: Joel Friesen 10; Asts: Cliff Clinkscales 6	Pts: Akeem Scott 19; Rebs: Stephen Maxwell 8 Asts: Akeem Scott 9
Halifax leads series 3–2

Budweiser Gardens, London
Attendance: 7,583

June 12
7:00 pm

Box score

London Lightning 93, Halifax Hurricanes 91
Scoring by quarter: 29–23, 12–20, 31–22, 21–26
Pts: Akeem Scott 24; Rebs: Stephen Maxwell 9 Asts: Akeem Scott 9	Pts: Justin Johnson 26; Rebs: Cliff Clinkscales, Joel Friesen, Shane Gibson, Kyle Hunt, Kevin Loiselle, Billy White, 5 each Asts: Cliff Clinkscales 9
London ties series 3–3

Scotiabank Centre, Halifax
Attendance: 2,133

June 13
7:00 pm

Box score

London Lightning 117, Halifax Hurricanes 125
Scoring by quarter: 24–23, 20–32, 43–27, 30–43
Pts: Stephen Maxwell, Garrett Williamson 25 each Rebs: Ryan Anderson 12; Asts: Garrett Williamson 7	Pts: Justin Johnson 41; Rebs: Kyle Hunt 8 Asts: Cliff Clinkscales 9
Halifax wins series 4–3

Scotiabank Centre, Halifax
Attendance: 2,399

== Notable occurrences ==
=== Offseason ===
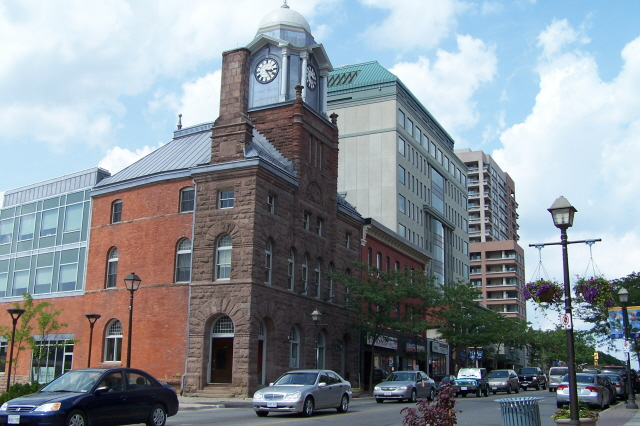

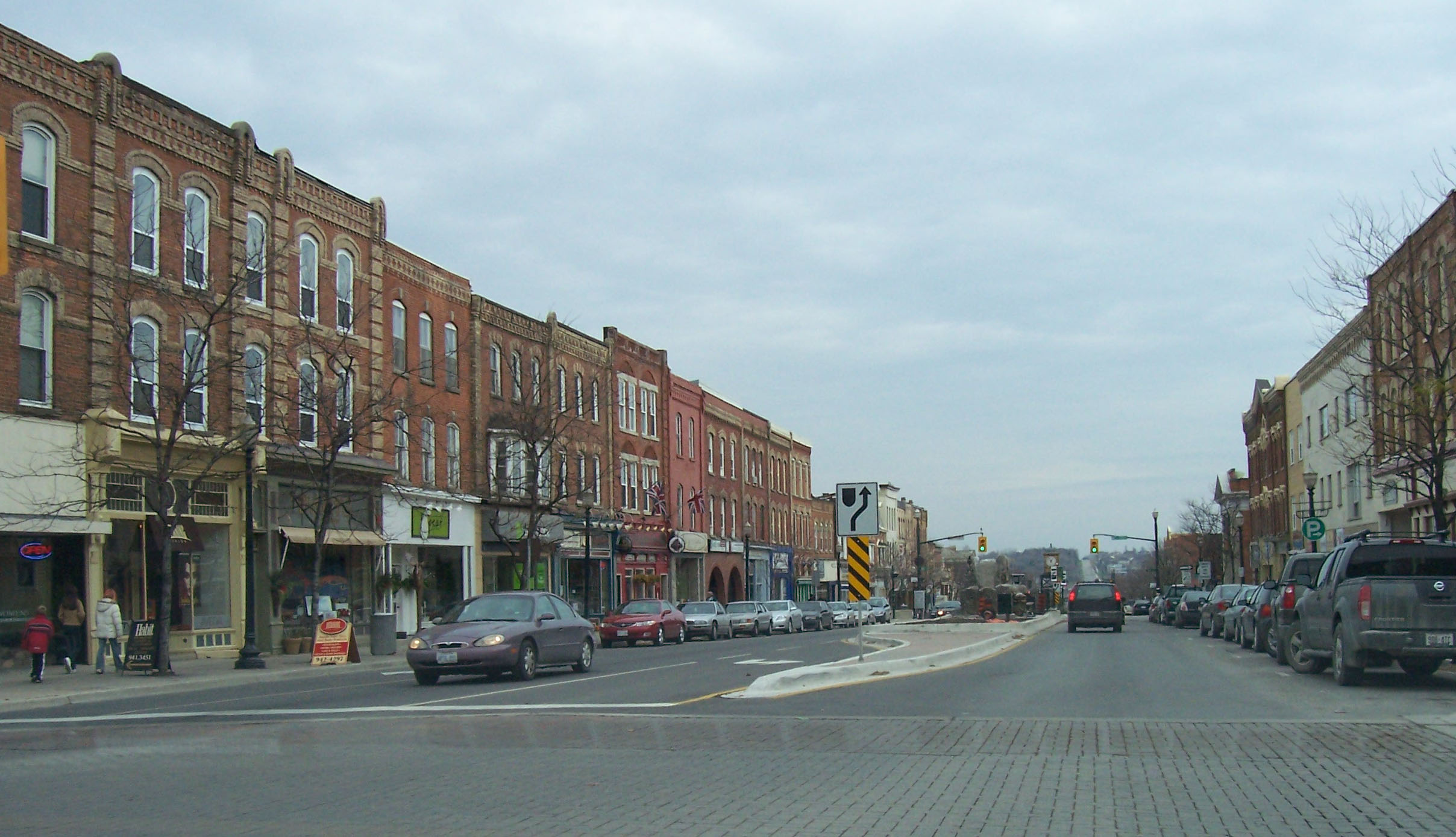
The A's relocated from Brampton (top) to Orangeville, Ontario (bottom) during the offseason.

- The league established a team from St. Catharines, Ontario called the Niagara River Lions. They begin play at the Meridian Centre as a member of the Central Division.
- The NBL Canada unanimously hired Brampton A's head coach and general manager Dave Magley as commissioner, succeeding Paul Riley.
- The Mississauga Power franchise folded with the creation of Raptors 905, a D-League affiliate to the Toronto Raptors of the NBA. Maple Leaf Sports & Entertainment (MLSE) acquired the team's rights.
- The Halifax Rainmen filed for bankruptcy in the fallout of the 2015 NBL Canada Finals brawl. The franchise later gets new ownership and is rebranded as the Halifax Hurricanes.
- The Brampton A's relocated from Brampton to Orangeville, Ontario. Their home arena changed from the Powerade Centre to the Athlete Institute. They were also renamed the Orangeville A's.
- The league announced the Cape Breton Highlanders, a new expansion team from Sydney, Nova Scotia, who were expected to operate in the 2015–16 season in the Atlantic Division. However they later announced they would not join until the 2016–17 season.
- The Saint John Mill Rats unveiled a new logo, slightly resembling their previous one, and an official slogan "Building Amazing Now".
- The Mill Rats signed two former NBL Canada Most Valuable Players in Anthony Anderson and Gabe Freeman in a key offseason acquisition.
- The league's Board of Governors approved of a stricter drug policy, a dress code, and created rules to promote sportsmanship.
- The defending champions Windsor Express got new members from a private local partner to add to its ownership.
- The Mill Rats set a franchise record with an attendance of 6,646 in a preseason game vs the Moncton Miracles on December 23, 2015.
- Doug Herring, Jr. of the Mill Rats and Logan Stutz of the River Lions become the first co-Players of the Week on December 27, 2015.
