= Robert Abramovič =

Slovenian basketball player

Personal information
- Born: September 15, 1988 (age 38) Ljubljana, Slovenia, Yugoslavia
- Listed height: 1.85 m (6 ft 1 in)
- Listed weight: 82 kg (181 lb)

Career information
- Playing career: 2002–present
- Position: Shooting guard / point guard

Career history
- 2002–2009: Jance STZ
- 2009–2012: Terme Olimia Podcetrtek
- 2012–2013: LTH Castings Skofja Loka
- 2013: UBSC Graz
- 2014: Zlatorog Laško
- 2014: BSC Raiffeisen Panthers Fürstenfeld
- 2014: Grosuplje
- 2014–2015: Hopsi Polzela
- 2015–2016: LTH Castings Skofja Loka
- 2016: Kožuv
- 2017: Zabok
- 2017: LTH Castings Skofja Loka
- 2017: KB Peja
- 2017–2018: Teodo Tivat
- 2018–2019: Mesarija Prunk Sežana
- 2019: KK Ljubljana
- 2020: Pivka Perutninarstvo

Robert Abramovič (born 15 September 1988) is a Slovenian professional basketball player.
