= Stephen Maxwell (basketball) =

American basketball player

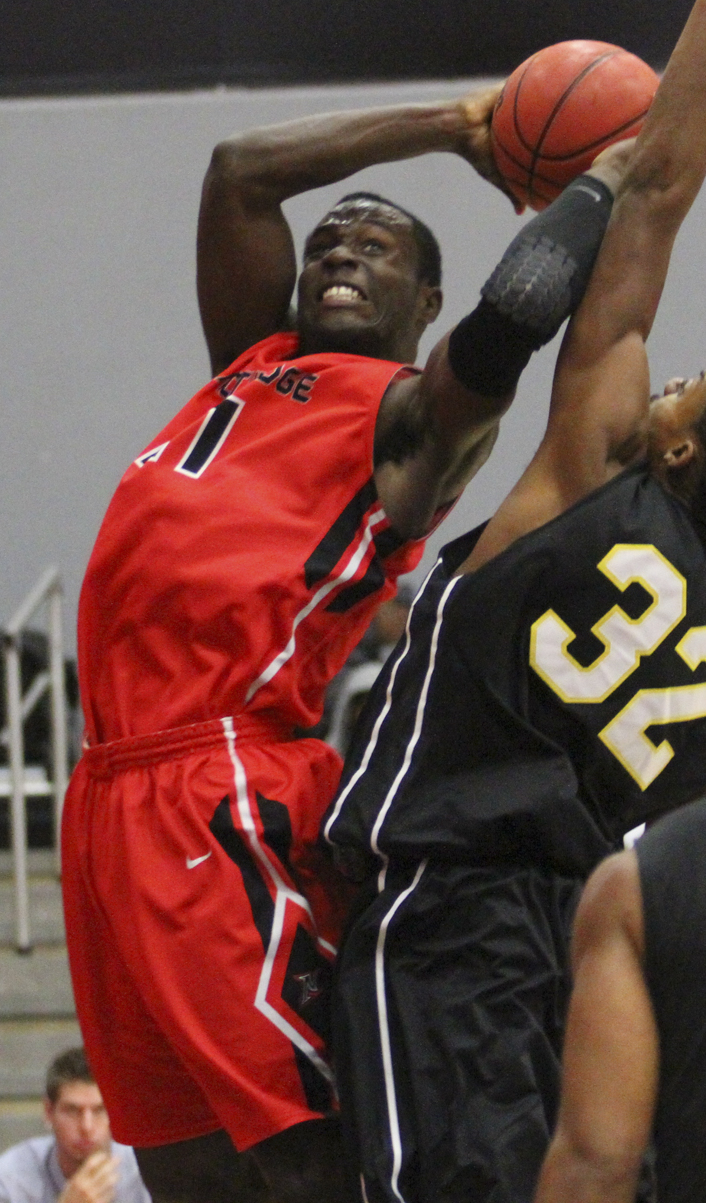
- Maxwell with Cal State Northridge in 2013

No. 21 – Universidad de Concepción
- Position: Power forward
- League: LNB Chile

Personal information
- Born: April 29, 1993 (age 33) Los Angeles, California
- Listed height: 6 ft 7 in (2.01 m)
- Listed weight: 220 lb (100 kg)

Career information
- High school: William Howard Taft (Woodland Hills, California)
- College: Cal State Northridge (2011–2015)
- NBA draft: 2015: undrafted
- Playing career: 2015–present

Career history
- 2015–2016: London Lightning
- 2017–2018: Karhu
- 2018: Hapoel Galil Elyon
- 2019–2021: Almansa
- 2021–2022: Peja
- 2023–2024: Riachuelo
- 2025–present: Universidad de Concepción

Career highlights
- LNB Chile Finals MVP (2026); LNB Chile champion (2026); Liga Unike champion (2022); Korisliiga champion (2018); NBL Canada Rookie of the Year (2016); All-NBL Canada First-team (2016); All-Big West First-team (2014)

Stephen Maxwell (born April 29, 1993) is an American professional basketball player for Universidad de Concepción of the Liga Nacional de Básquetbol de Chile (LNB Chile). He played four seasons of college basketball for the Cal State Northridge Matadors. Prior to his years with the Matadors, Maxwell competed for William Howard Taft Charter High School in Woodland Hills, Los Angeles. As a rookie, he played for the London Lightning of the National Basketball League of Canada (NBLC) and was named Rookie of the Year.

== Early life ==
Maxwell was born on April 29, 1993, in Los Angeles, California, to Darlene and Kevin Maxwell. He has two sisters, Tiffany and Jessica, and one brother, Kevin. Maxwell grew up in the Los Angeles neighborhood of Woodland Hills.

== High school career ==
Maxwell attended William Howard Taft Charter High School in his hometown, where he played basketball under seasoned head coach Derrick Taylor. For much of Maxwell's high school campaign, the team was led by Spencer Dinwiddie, who would play at Colorado in college and then the NBA. During his senior season, in December 2010, Maxwell posted a career-high 24 points along with nine rebounds and five steals to defeat Stockdale High School at the Mission Prep Christmas Classic. He averaged 12 points and seven rebounds as a senior and won the Los Angeles city championship behind a 28–3 record. He also amassed first team all-league and all-city honors.

== College career ==
Maxwell played college basketball for California State University's Matadors.

In his junior year, Maxwell was one of the top players in the Big West Conference in 2013-14 at 17.5 points (tops on the CSUN team, #4 in the BWC) and a team leading 8.8 rebounds per game, second-best in the Big West Conference. Maxwell earned a spot in the All-Big West First-team.

In his senior year, Maxwell averaged 14.7 points and 7.9 rebounds per game while starting all 33 contests for CSUN. Maxwell was named All-Big West Conference Honorable Mention.

== Professional career ==
In 2015, Maxwell started his professional career with the London Lightning of the National Basketball League of Canada. On February 10, 2016, Maxwell recorded a double-double with a career-high 32 points and 15 rebounds, shooting 12-of-19 from the field, in a 123–114 win over the Niagara River Lions. Maxwell finished the season as the league best rebounder with 12.7 rebounds per game. On May 6, 2016, Maxwell was named 2016 NBL Canada Rookie of the Year and earned a spot in the All-NBL Canada First Team.

On August 9, 2017, Maxwell signed with the Finnish team Kauhajoki Karhu Basket for the 2017–18 season. On April 8, 2018, Maxwell recorded a season-high 29 points, shooting 11-of-15 from the field, along with seven rebounds in an 84–74 win over Tampereen Pyrintö. In 45 games played for Karhu, he averaged 16.5 points and 7.5 rebounds per game. Maxwell helped Karhu to win the 2018 Korisliiga Championship.

On August 23, 2018, Maxwell signed a one-year deal with the Israeli team Hapoel Galil Elyon of the Liga Leumit. However, on November 29, 2018, Maxwell parted ways with Galil Elyon after appearing in six games.
