= Marjan Janevski =

Macedonian basketball player (born 1988)

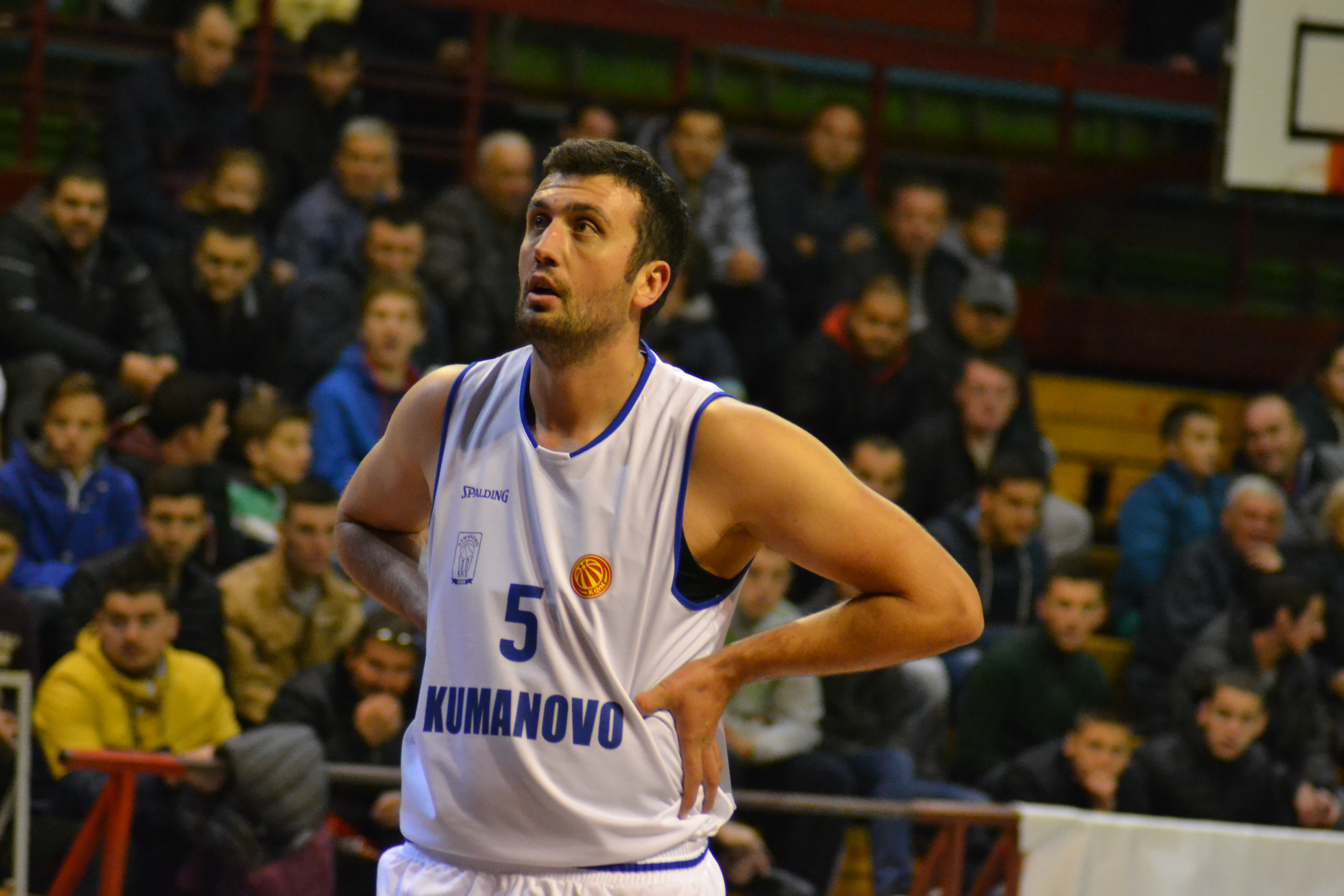

No. 5 – Butel
- Position: Power forward
- League: Macedonian Second League

Personal information
- Born: February 26, 1988 (age 38) Gostivar, Republic of Macedonia
- Listed height: 6 ft 8 in (2.03 m)
- Listed weight: 236 lb (107 kg)

Career information
- Playing career: 2006–present

Career history
- 2006–2008: Gostivar
- 2008–2009: Rabotnički
- 2009–2011: Torus
- 2011: MZT Skopje
- 2011–2018: Kumanovo
- 2018–2019: Rabotnički
- 2019–2020: Kumanovo
- 2020–2022: Gostivar
- 2022–2026: MKK Kumanovo
- 2026–present: Butel

Marjan Janevski (born February 26, 1988) is a Macedonian professional basketball player for KK Butel of the Macedonian First League. He is also a member of the Macedonian national basketball team.
