= Matija Češković =

Personal information
- Born: May 20, 1981 (age 45)
- Listed height: 1.92 m (6 ft 4 in)
- Listed weight: 90 kg (198 lb)

Career information
- Playing career: 2005–present
- Position: Guard

Career history
- 1998–1999: Zrinjevac
- 2000–2001: Šanac Karlovac
- 2001–2002: Velika Gorica
- 2002–2003: Dona Dubrava
- 2003–2004: Koper
- 2005: Czarni Słupsk
- 2005: Helios Domžale
- 2006–2007: HKK Široki
- 2007: Kolossos Rodou
- 2008: Kaposvári
- 2008–2009: Peramatos Ermis
- 2009: Bosna
- 2009–2010: PVSK Panthers
- 2010: Kaposvári
- 2010: Trogir
- 2010–2011: Orchies
- 2011–2012: Kvarner
- 2012–2013: BC Mureș
- 2013–2014: Atlassib Sibiu
- 2014–2015: BC Mureș
- 2015: Atlassib Sibiu
- 2015–2016: Aurore Vitré Basket
- 2016–2017: Feni Industries
- 2017–2018: Šanac Karlovac

Matija Češković (born May 20, 1981) is a Croatian professional basketball Guard who last played for Šanac Karlovac.
