= Serge Langis =

Canadian teacher and professional basketball coach

Career information
- College: St. Thomas; Maine at Presque Isle

Career history

Coaching
- 2012: Moncton Miracles (interim)
- 2014–2016: Moncton Miracles
- 2016–2018: KW Titans

Serge Langis is a Canadian teacher and professional basketball coach, last serving as the head coach of the KW Titans in the National Basketball League of Canada (NBL Canada). He previously served as assistant coach (2012–14) and head coach (2015–16) for the Moncton Miracles of the NBL Canada. He was released by the Moncton Miracles in February, 2016. He is also a high school social studies teacher at J.M.A. Armstrong High School in Salisbury, New Brunswick. Langis is the co-owner of Sweat Academy Player Development, an offseason basketball development program in Atlantic Canada, and earned a degree in psychology at St. Thomas University and an education degree while attending the University of Maine at Presque Isle.

== Personal ==
Langis lives in Moncton, New Brunswick, and has a wife, Nicole, and a son Olivier.
