= Dvorana Župa Tivat =

Sports arena in Tivat, Montenegro

Župa Hall
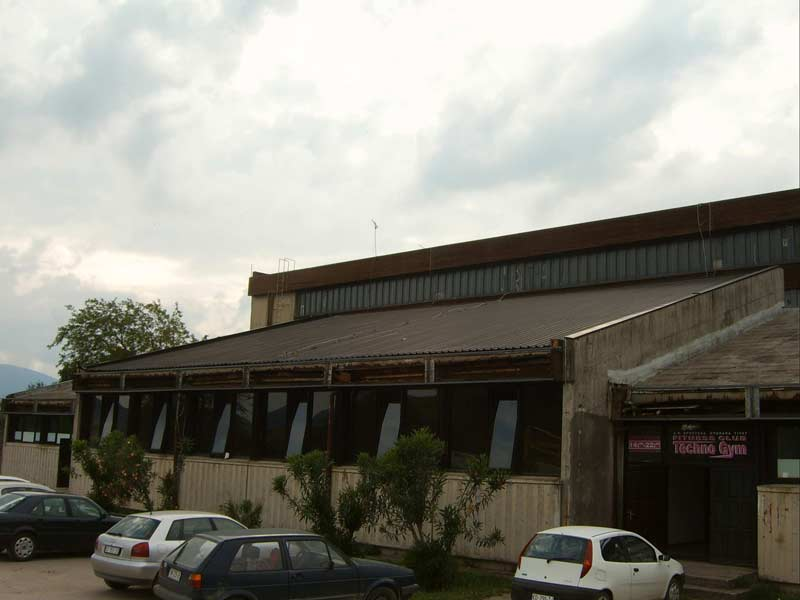
- Location: Tivat, Montenegro
- Coordinates: 42°25′19.23″N 18°42′33.13″E
- Owner: Opština Tivat
- Capacity: 1,500
- Opened: 1985

Tenants
- KK Teodo; RK Boka; ŽRK Tivat

Župa Hall (Montenegrin, Дворана Жупа, Dvorana Župa) is a sports arena in Tivat, Montenegro, located in the Tivat's settlement Župa, by which it got its name. The capacity of the hall is 750-900 seats. Župa Sports Hall is one kilometer from the center of Tivat.

== Facilities ==
- A large hall for various sports with 900 seats
- Small hall for recreation
- Bowling club
- A gyms for various sport preparations
- The possibility for a large number of extra sports contents (table tennis, billiards ...)

== History ==
The hall was established and opened in 1985, the main cause was competition "Trophy of Yugoslavy" in handball.

In 1988 hall was a host to basketball match between Yugoslavia and the United States.

After that was a various competitions in multiply sports, including: European Championship in Bocce which was held from 27 September to 3 October in Tivat. EHF regional handball competition hosted by RK "Partizan" ABA 2 Basketball league hosted by KK "Teodo"

In 2011 it was home of the Montenegro Basketball Cup final tournament for women.

In 2019 the hall was a host to Olympic games of small countries for table tennis.

Montenegro women's national handball team played against Slovenia in this hall.

Date	Opponent	Result	Notes
01. 12. 2010.	Slovenia	35–25	A friendly game.
