= Sudbury Five =

Basketball team in Sudbury, Ontario, Canada

- League: Basketball Super League (North America)
- Founded: 2018
- History: Sudbury Five (2018–present)
- Arena: Sudbury Community Arena
- Location: Greater Sudbury, Ontario
- Team colours: Orange and crimson
- General manager: Joey Puddister
- Head coach: Joey Puddister
- Ownership: Sudbury Wolves Sports and Entertainment
- Championships: 2 (2025, 2026)
- Website: thefive.ca

The Sudbury Five are a Canadian professional basketball team based in Sudbury, Ontario that play in the Basketball Super League (BSL). The team is owned by Sudbury Wolves Sports & Entertainment (SWSE) and play at the Sudbury Community Arena.

== History ==
The team was originally approved by the National Basketball League of Canada (NBL Canada) to begin play for the 2017–18 season, but was pushed back to the 2018–19 season. The organization announced their team name, Sudbury Five, and colours in May 2018. Logan Stutz was named the team's first general manager and head coach on 9 August. The team took part in the 2018 entry draft with the other nine NBL Canada teams and later received the Niagara River Lions' protected player list after that team left the league.

The team's second season was curtailed by the onset of the COVID-19 pandemic and the following 2020–21 season was cancelled by the league. In 2021, general manager and head coach Logan Stutz was hired by the Boston College Eagles as director of player development and left the Five.

== Name and logo ==
The team's name and logo refer to the last digit in the 705 area code that serves Northern Ontario, the five-cent nickel coin, and the five players playing for each team in a basketball game.

== Arena ==
The team play their home games at the Sudbury Community Arena. Tickets for basketball are only sold on the sides and floor of the arena, giving it a capacity 2,500 with room to expand.

== Season-by-season record ==
Season	Coach	Regular season				Post season			
Season	Coach	Won	Lost	Win %	Finish	Won	Lost	Win %	Result
2018–19	Logan Stutz	21	19	.525	3rd	2	3	.400	Lost in Division Semifinals
2019–20	Logan Stutz	13	10	.565	Season curtailed by the COVID-19 pandemic				
2021–22	Logan Stutz	12	12	.500	3rd	1	3	.250	Lost in Division Semifinals
2022–23	Logan Stutz	24	12	.667	3rd	2	3	.400	Lost In Division Semifinals
2023–24	Logan Stutz	19	13	.594	3rd	1	3	.250	Lost in Division Semifinals
2024–25	Logan Stutz	20	9	.690	1st	6	4	.600	League Champions
2025–26	Joey Puddister	17	9	.654	2nd	6	3	.667	League Champions
Totals		125	84	.598	-	18	19	.486	6 playoff appearances

== Players ==
=== Current roster ===
Note: Flags indicate national team eligibility at FIBA-sanctioned events. Players may hold other non-FIBA nationalities not displayed.

Sudbury Five roster
Players
Coaches

Pos.	No.	Nat.	Name	Ht.	Wt.	Age
G	1	(United States)	Bland, Jaylen	6 ft 2 in (1.88 m)	205 lb (93 kg)	33 – 29 March 1993
G	12	(Canada)	Duvivier, Malcolm	6 ft 2 in (1.88 m)	210 lb (95 kg)	31 – 28 March 1995
SF	15	(United States)	Holder, J.R.	6 ft 6 in (1.98 m)	180 lb (82 kg)	31 – 24 August 1994
PF	11	(United States)	Johnson, Marlon	6 ft 10 in (2.08 m)	215 lb (98 kg)	32 – 28 February 1994
PF	31	(United States)	Lewis, Carl	6 ft 10 in (2.08 m)	285 lb (129 kg)	25 – 1 April 2001
SG	0	(Canada)	Moore, Josiah	6 ft 5 in (1.96 m)	215 lb (98 kg)	33 – 27 November 1992
F	21	(Canada)	Pryce, Jelane	6 ft 8 in (2.03 m)	196 lb (89 kg)	33 – 29 May 1993
PG	3	(Canada)	Puddister, Joey	6 ft 0 in (1.83 m)	175 lb (79 kg)	34 – 15 July 1992
G	2	(United States)	Rayson, Braylon	5 ft 9 in (1.75 m)	190 lb (86 kg)	31 – 25 December 1994
G/F	9	(Canada)	Serresse, Georges	6 ft 3 in (1.91 m)	201 lb (91 kg)	36 – 29 April 1990
F	22	(United States)	Skeens, Brady	6 ft 7 in (2.01 m)	211 lb (96 kg)	31 – 8 August 1995
G/F	4	(United States)	Williams, Dexter	6 ft 4 in (1.93 m)	212 lb (96 kg)	33 – 27 March 1993

Head coach

- (United States) Logan Stutz

Legend

- (C) Team captain
- (I) Inactive
- Injured

- Roster
- Transactions
Updated: December 23, 2019
