= NBL Canada Coach of the Year Award =

The NBL Canada Coach of the Year Award, is an annual National Basketball League of Canada award given since the 2011–12 season. Since its inception, the award has been given to 5 different coaches. Micheal Ray Richardson of the London Lightning is the only coach to get the award more than once. In the 2012–13 season Richardson shared the award with Joe Salerno. The most recent recipient is Hugo López of the Halifax Hurricanes. After receiving the award in 2015, Josep Clarós was handed a lifetime ban from the NBL Canada, for forfeiting the seventh game of the 2015 Finals.

== Winners ==
^	Denotes a tie for Coach of the Year

Season	Coach	Nationality	Team	Reference
2011–12	Micheal Ray Richardson	United States	London Lightning	
2012–13	Micheal Ray Richardson (2)	United States	London Lightning	
2012–13	Joe Salerno	United States	Summerside Storm	
2013–14	Bill Jones	United States	Windsor Express	
2014–15	Josep Clarós	Spain	Halifax Rainmen	
2015–16	Hugo López	Spain	Halifax Hurricanes	
2016–17	Kyle Julius	Canada	London Lightning	
2017–18	Mike Leslie	Canada	Halifax Hurricanes	
2018–19	Joe Salerno	United States	Moncton Magic	
2019–20	Joe Salerno (3)	United States	Moncton Magic	
