= 2018–19 NBL Canada season =

- League: National Basketball League of Canada
- Sport: Basketball
- Duration: November 15, 2018 – March 31, 2019
- Games: 40
- Teams: 10

Draft
- Top draft pick: Miles Seward
- Picked by: Moncton Magic

Regular Season
- Top seed: Moncton Magic
- Season MVP: Braylon Rayson

Playoffs
- Atlantic champions: Moncton Magic
- Central champions: St. John's Edge

Finals
- Champions: Moncton Magic
- Runners-up: St. John's Edge

NBL Canada seasons
- ← 2017–18 2019–20 →

The 2018–19 NBL Canada season is the eighth season of the National Basketball League of Canada. The regular season ran from November 15, 2018, to March 31, 2019.

== League changes ==
The league originally intended to move the St. John's Edge to the Atlantic Division following the addition of the expansion Sudbury Five. However, after the NBL lost the Niagara River Lions and was back to four teams in Ontario, the league decided to play as a single table for the regular season schedule to ease the Edge's travel. The league still uses each team's overall record in a divisional table for playoff qualification as done in previous seasons.

=== Offseason coaching changes ===
- The Cape Breton Highlanders hired Bernardo Fitz-Gonzalez, a former Colombia national basketball team player, after former coach Rob Spon left the team after one season.
- The St. John's Edge hired Doug Plumb after former coach Jeff Dunlap left to become an assistant at California State University, Northridge.
- The Sudbury Five hired Logan Stutz as its inaugural head coach and general manager.

=== Midseason coaching changes ===
- The London Lightning fired Keith Vassell following a 4–4 start to the season after leading the team to a championship the previous season. He was replaced by Elliott Etherington.
- The St. John's Edge head coach Doug Plumb resigned in March 2019 and was replaced by assistant Steven Marcus as interim head coach.

== Teams ==
2018-19 National Basketball League of Canada
Division	Team	City	Arena	Capacity
Atlantic	Cape Breton Highlanders	Sydney, Nova Scotia	Centre 200	5,000
Atlantic	Halifax Hurricanes	Halifax, Nova Scotia	Scotiabank Centre	10,500
Atlantic	Island Storm	Charlottetown, Prince Edward Island	Eastlink Centre	4,000
Atlantic	Moncton Magic	Moncton, New Brunswick	Avenir Centre	8,800
Atlantic	Saint John Riptide	Saint John, New Brunswick	Harbour Station	6,603
Central	KW Titans	Kitchener, Ontario	Kitchener Memorial Auditorium	7,312
Central	London Lightning	London, Ontario	Budweiser Gardens	9,000
Central	St. John's Edge	St. John's, Newfoundland and Labrador	Mile One Centre	6,750
Central	Sudbury Five	Sudbury, Ontario	Sudbury Community Arena	4,640
Central	Windsor Express	Windsor, Ontario	WFCU Centre	6,500

=== Map of teams ===
Atlantic Division Central Division

== Regular season ==
Standings as of 31 March 2019:

Atlantic Division	GP	W	L	PCT	GB	Div
z — Moncton Magic	40	27	13	.675	—	18–7
x — Halifax Hurricanes	40	25	15	.625	2	13–11
x — Cape Breton Highlanders	40	19	21	.475	8	13–9
x — Saint John Riptide	40	17	23	.425	10	10–15
Island Storm	40	12	28	.300	15	7–19

Central Division	GP	W	L	PCT	GB	Div
c — London Lightning	40	22	18	.550	—	16–11
x — St. John's Edge	40	21	19	.525	1	7–7
x — Sudbury Five	40	21	19	.525	1	14–14
x — KW Titans	40	19	21	.475	3	14–12
Windsor Express	40	17	23	.425	5	10–17

Notes

- z – Clinched home court advantage for the entire playoffs
- c – Clinched home court advantage for the division playoffs
- x – Clinched playoff spot

=== Attendance ===
As of the end of the regular season

Pos	Team	Total	High	Low	Average	Change
1	St. John's Edge	75,884	6,080	2,156	3,794	+11.6%
2	London Lightning	60,799	8,024	1,324	3,040	−27.7%
3	Halifax Hurricanes	41,894	4,473	1,123	2,095	+7.0%
4	Sudbury Five^{1}	40,952	3,480	1,299	2,048	n/a
5	Saint John Riptide	31,453	4,012	471	1,573	−16.5%
6	KW Titans	26,022	5,036	499	1,301	+2.9%
7	Cape Breton Highlanders	24,762	4,108	576	1,238	−8.6%
8	Island Storm	24,482	1,825	899	1,224	−34.7%
9	Windsor Express	23,056	1,624	650	1,153	+18.3%
10	Moncton Magic	23,048	1,964	862	1,152	+7.6%
	League total	372,352	8,024	471	1,862	−7.1%

Notes:
1: New team.

== Playoffs ==
Division Semifinals
A1	Moncton	3
A4	Saint John	0
Atlantic Division
A2	Halifax	3
A3	Cape Breton	2
C1	London	2
C4	Kitchener–Waterloo	3
Central Division
C2	St. John's	3
C3	Sudbury	2

Division Finals
A1	Moncton	4
A2	Halifax	3
C4	Kitchener–Waterloo	2
C2	St. John's	4

NBL Canada Finals
A1	Moncton	4
C2	St. John's	0

Bold Series winner
Italic Team with home-court advantage

=== NBL Canada Finals ===
May 9
7:00 pm

Box score

St. John's Edge 94, Moncton Magic 103
Scoring by quarter: 18–19, 16–21, 31–29, 29–34
Pts: Murphy Burnatowski 30; Rebs: Jarryn Skeete 9 Asts: Carl English 5	Pts: Trey Kell 29; Rebs: Trey Kell, Billy White 9 each Asts: Trey Kell, Billy White 8 each
Moncton leads series 1–0

Avenir Centre, Moncton
Attendance: 1,837

May 11
7:00 pm

Box score

St. John's Edge 100, Moncton Magic 107
Scoring by quarter: 31–19, 21–27, 25–25, 23–36
Pts: Desmond Lee 26; Rebs: Glen Davis, Desmond Lee 7 Asts: Glen Davis 7	Pts: Trey Kell 29; Rebs: Jason Calliste, Trey Kell 9 each Asts: Billy White 8
Moncton leads series 2–0

Avenir Centre, Moncton
Attendance: 3,505

May 13
7:00 pm

Box score

Moncton Magic 103, St. John's Edge 93
Scoring by quarter: 27–24, 22–21, 21–28, 33–20
Pts: Trey Kell 20; Rebs: Trey Kell 11; Asts: Billy White 8	Pts: Carl English 22; Rebs: Carl English 6 Asts: Junior Cadougan 5
Moncton leads series 3–0

Mile One Centre, St. John's
Attendance: 3,923

May 16
7:00 pm

Box score

Moncton Magic 130, St. John's Edge 120
Scoring by quarter: 40–20, 32–30, 29–39, 29–31
Pts: Trey Kell 41; Rebs: Trey Kell 9 Asts: Trey Kell 6	Pts: Desmond Lee 43; Rebs: Desmond Lee 13; Asts: Glen Davis 5
Moncton wins series 4–0

Mile One Centre, St. John's
Attendance: 4,328

== Statistics ==
As of games played 31 March 2019

=== Individual statistic leaders ===
Category	Player	Team	Statistic
Points per game	Braylon Rayson	Sudbury Five	25.0
Rebounds per game	Bryce Washington	Saint John Riptide	11.25
Assists per game	Cliff Clinkscales	Halifax Hurricanes	6.80
Blocks per game	Ty Walker	Windsor Express	2.23
Three pointers	Jaylen Bland	Sudbury Five	4.54

=== Individual game highs ===
Category	Player	Team	Statistic
Points	Braylon Rayson	Sudbury Five	49
Rebounds	Obinna Oleka	St. John's Edge	24
Assists	Cliff Clinkscales	Halifax Hurricanes	18

== Awards ==
=== Player of the Week award ===
For games in week ending	Player of the week		Canadian player of the week	
For games in week ending	Player	Team	Player	Team
November 18, 2018	Jaylen Bland	Sudbury Five	Gentrey Thomas	Moncton Magic
November 25, 2018	Bruce Massey	Cape Breton Highlanders	Jamal Reynolds	Cape Breton Highlanders
December 2, 2018	Gabe Freeman	Halifax Hurricanes	Tyler Scott	Island Storm
December 9, 2018	Maurice Jones	St. John's Edge	Joel Friesen	KW Titans
December 16, 2018	Doug Herring Jr.	Moncton Magic	Grandy Glaze	Sudbury Five
December 23, 2018	Joel Kindred	Halifax Hurricanes	Aaron Redpath	Cape Breton Highlanders
December 30, 2018	Bruce Massey (2)	Cape Breton Highlanders	Garrett Williamson	London Lightning
January 6, 2019	Mike Poole	Halifax Hurricanes	Junior Cadougan	St. John's Edge
January 13, 2019	Bruce Massey (3)	Cape Breton Highlanders	Guillaume Boucard	Island Storm
January 20, 2019	Juan Patillo	Windsor Express	Garrett Williamson (2)	London Lightning
January 27, 2019	Cory Dixon	Sudbury Five	Tyrrel Tate	Windsor Express
February 3, 2019	Glen Davis	St. John's Edge	Terry Thomas	Halifax Hurricanes
February 10, 2019	Mike Poole (2)	Halifax Hurricanes	Mamadou Gueye	Sudbury Five
February 17, 2019	Frank Bartley	Saint John Riptide	Junior Cadougan (2)	St. John's Edge
February 24, 2019	Trey Kell	Moncton Magic	Junior Cadougan (3)	St. John's Edge
March 3, 2019	Braylon Rayson	Sudbury Five	Guillaume Boucard (2)	Island Storm
March 10, 2019	Chris Jones	Windsor Express	Yohanny Dalembert	Sudbury Five
March 17, 2019	Frank Bartley (2)	Saint John Riptide	Alex Campbell	Island Storm
March 24, 2019	Braylon Rayson (2)	Sudbury Five	Terry Thomas (2)	Halifax Hurricanes
March 31, 2019	Marcus Capers	London Lightning	Jamal Reynolds (2)	Cape Breton Highlanders

=== Coach of the Month award ===
Month	Player	Team
November	Joe Salerno	Moncton Magic
December	Bernado Fitz-Gonzalez	Cape Breton Highlanders
January	Bill Jones	Windsor Express
February	Mike Leslie	Halifax Hurricanes
March	Joe Salerno (2)	Moncton Magic

=== End-of-season awards ===
- Most Valuable Player: Braylon Rayson, Sudbury Five
- Canadian Player of the Year: Guillaume Boucard, Island Storm
- Newcomer of the Year: Jaylen Bland, Sudbury Five
- Defensive Player of the Year: Rhamel Brown, Halifax Hurricanes
- Rookie of the Year: Frank Bartley, Saint John Riptide
- Sixth Man of the Year: Jamal Reynolds, Cape Breton Highlanders
- Most Improved Player of the Year: Junior Cadougan, St. John's Edge
- Coach of the Year: Joe Salerno, Moncton Magic

== Draft ==
The 2018–19 NBL Canada Draft and Combine was held on August 25–26.

Rnd.	Pick	Player	Nationality	Team	School / club team
1	1	Miles Seward	Canada	Moncton Magic	Harcum College
1	2	Aaron Jackson	United States	KW Titans	East Carolina
1	3	Charles Boozer	United States	Cape Breton Highlanders	Iowa State
1	4	Brent Arrington	United States	Saint John Riptide	Morehead State
1	5	Darnell Landon	Canada	Saint John Riptide	Mayville State
1	6	Gabe McCray	United States	Saint John Riptide	South Carolina State
1	7	Edward Asamoah	Canada	Moncton Magic	Bridgeport
1	8	Funsho Dimeji	Canada	Sudbury Five	Durham
1	9	Chris Early	United States	St. John's Edge	Chattanooga
1	10	Jonathan Wallace	Canada	London Lightning	Guelph
1	11	Davon Eley	United States	Halifax Hurricanes	Lakeland
2	1	Miroslav Jaksic	Serbia	Windsor Express	Oklahoma Christian
2	2	Matthew Hart	United States	KW Titans	George Washington
2	3	Benjamin Batts Jr.	United States	Cape Breton Highlanders	LSU–Shreveport
2	4	Marcus Jones	Canada	Cape Breton Highlanders	Windsor
2	5	David Atkinson	United States	Saint John Riptide	Salem
2	6	Daniel Dooley	Canada	Windsor Express	Guelph
2	7	Aaron Edison	United States	St. John's Edge	Santa Monica
2	8	Jameel Williamson	Canada	London Lightning	St. Francis Xavier
2	9	Donell Tuff	United States	Halifax Hurricanes	Albany State
