= Maritime Elite Basketball League =

Canadian professional men's minor league basketball organization

The Maritime Elite Basketball League (MEBL)
- Current season, competition or edition: 2027 MEBL season
- Sport: Basketball
- Founded: 2026; 0 years ago
- First season: 2027
- Motto: Where the spirit of the game lives
- No. of teams: 4
- Countries: Canada
- Continent: North America
- Website: meblhoops.ca

The Maritime Elite Basketball League (MEBL) is a Canadian professional men's minor league basketball organization. It operates as a Partner League of The Basketball League..

== History ==
=== Establishment ===
Before the 2019–20 season, Saint John Riptide as their respective owner tried to sell the teams and the league shrank to eight teams. During the season, the COVID-19 pandemic caused games to be suspended on March 12, 2020. The season was then entirely cancelled as the pandemic closed arenas and travel was restricted. The league initially delayed the start to the 2020–21 season as the pandemic continued into 2021. On March 4, 2021, NBL Canada announced there would be no 2020–21 season.

During the hiatus, the Halifax Hurricanes and Moncton Magic both withdrew from the league. Subsequently, the Island Storm withdrew from the season as it was the only remaining member in the Maritimes ready to play in the 2021–22 season, leaving the league with only the four active teams in Ontario. In order to fill the schedule, the league agreed to inter-league series play with the US-based The Basketball League (TBL), run by former NBLC commissioner David Magley and his wife Evelyn.

Following the conclusion of the 2022–23 NBLC season, the remaining NBLC teams were merged along with teams from the TBL into the new Basketball Super League.

After the dissolution of NBLC following their 2022–23 season, Dave Magley announced the formation of the Basketball Super League (BSL), whose teams would engage in interleague play with TBL franchises beginning in 2024.

After competing in The Basketball League and advancing to the league championship in 2026, the Tri City Tide, based in Moncton, New Brunswick (parish)announced the need to create a league in partnership with The Basketball League, to serve the markets previously competed National Basketball League of Canada of Halifax, Saint John Riptide, Island Storm That makes the MEBL–TBL partnership significant not only for the league, but for basketball throughout the region.

== Teams ==
2027 MEBL Teams

=== Current teams ===
Maritime Elite Basketball League teams
Team	City	Arena	Founded	Joined	Head coach
Halifax	Halifax, Nova Scotia	TBA	2026	2027	TBA
Saint John	Saint John, New Brunswick	TBA	2026	2027	Rob Spon
Tri-City Tide	Moncton, New Brunswick	Crandall University	2024	2027	Todd McKillop
Prince Edward Island	Charlottetown, Prince Edward Island	TBA	2026	2027	
