= Cliff Clinkscales =

American basketball player (born 1984)

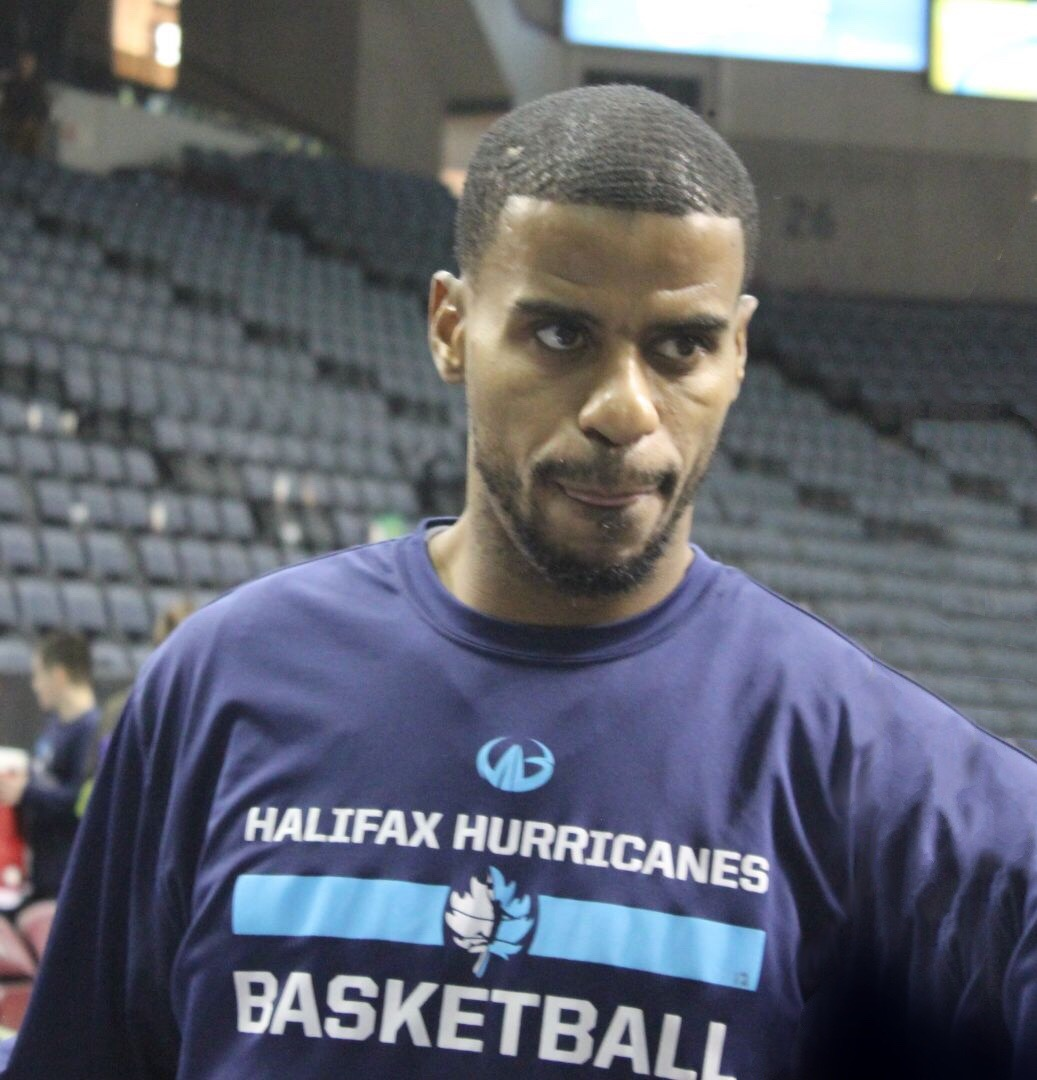
- Clinkscales in 2016

KW Titans
- Title: Assistant coach
- League: NBL Canada

Personal information
- Born: March 11, 1984 (age 42) New York City, US
- Listed height: 6 ft 1 in (1.85 m)

Career information
- High school: Springfield Gardens (Springfield Gardens, New York); Shores Christian Academy (Ocala, Florida)
- College: DePaul (2004–2008)
- NBA draft: 2008: undrafted
- Playing career: 2008–2020
- Position: Point guard
- Number: 12
- Coaching career: 2021–present

Career history

Playing
- 2008–2009: Erie BayHawks
- 2009: Rio Grande Valley Vipers
- 2009–2010: Erie BayHawks
- 2013: Panama City Breeze
- 2014–2015: Halifax Rainmen
- 2015–2020: Halifax Hurricanes

Coaching
- 2021–present: KW Titans (assistant)

Career highlights
- NBL Canada champion (2016); NBL Canada All-Star (2014)

Clifford Clinkscales (born March 11, 1984) is an American professional basketball head coach and retired player. He is the head coach of the KW Titans of the Basketball Super League. A 6-foot-1-inch (1.85 m) point guard, Clinkscales began playing professionally in 2008, with two seasons in the NBA Development League (NBA D-League). He spent most of his professional career in NBL Canada, playing from 2013 to 2020 in Halifax for the Rainmen and the Hurricanes. (Note: The Hurricanes replaced the Rainmen in NBL Canada in 2015 after the Rainmen folded.) With the Halifax Hurricanes, he set the record for the most career assists in NBL Canada history.

A native of Jamaica, Queens, in New York City, Clinkscales rose to prominence as a basketball player at a young age. After his freshman year at Springfield Gardens High School, he transferred to Shores Christian Academy in Ocala, Florida, where his team won the National Association of Christian Athletes title. He was rated as a three-star recruit, and several major college basketball programs showed interest in him. Clinkscales played college basketball for the DePaul Blue Demons from 2004 to 2008. He averaged 8.3 points per game in his first season in college while also becoming the fifth freshman in DePaul history to record 100 assists in a season. Although most of his statistics stagnated in his remaining years in college and his scoring average dropped, he led NCAA Division I in assist-to-turnover ratio as a senior.

Clinkscales was selected in the 2008 NBA Development League Draft by the Erie BayHawks, where he played most of his D-League career. After a three-year hiatus and one season in the American Basketball League with the Panama City Breeze, he began his NBL Canada career. In NBL Canada, he was an NBL Canada All-Star in 2014 and won the league championship as a member of the Halifax Hurricanes in 2016. Following his retirement in 2020, he returned to the league as an assistant coach in 2021. He has been the head coach of the KW Titans starting in the 2022–23 season.

== Early life ==
Born on March 11, 1984, Cliff Clinkscales was brought up in Jamaica, Queens, with three siblings. He was raised by his mother and a family friend, Clarence Washington. Washington introduced a young Clinkscales to the game of basketball; Clinkscales' sister, Kima, taught him to dribble.

Shortly before entering fifth grade, in the summer of 1996, Clinkscales, standing 4 feet 8 inches (1.42 m), was noticed in an ABCD Camp in Teaneck, New Jersey.The camp was designed for college-level basketball hopefuls.

== High school career ==
Despite achieving distinction at a young age, Clinkscales soon fell out of the public view. He spent one year in Springfield Gardens High School in Queens, but poor grades prevented him from playing basketball there. The next year, he transferred to Shores Christian Academy in Ocala, Florida.< He switched schools because he wanted to improve his academic performance, and one of his friends knew the new school's basketball coach, Allan Adams.

At Shores Christian Academy, Clinkscales became a top player on the basketball team. On January 3, 2004, he recorded 24 points and 8 assists, including a layup with four seconds left in the game, to defeat Trinity Catholic by one point. In another contest that month, Clinkscales notched 31 points and 11 assists in a triple-overtime loss to Gainesville High School, the top-ranked team at the Diamondback Challenge tournament. In the Florida Christian Athletic League's south quarterfinals, he had 40 points and 14 assists as his team beat Ocala Word of Faith by a 100–32 margin. In the district title contest, he scored 26 points, with 15 assists, 6 rebounds, and 3 steals. Clinkscales's team won the National Association of Christian Athletes championship behind a 36-win season, and he was named the Ocala Star-Banner boys' basketball player of the year.

The low competition level at Ocala prevented Clinkscales from drawing national attention. He was, however, in the spotlight playing for the Atlanta Celtics, an Amateur Athletic Union (AAU) program made up of players such as Dwight Howard, Josh Smith, and Randolph Morris. He joined the team because they needed a reliable point guard. The Celtics won the Adidas Big Time Tournament, sparking coaches' interest in Clinkscales once again. Basketball news website The Hoop Scoop named Clinkscales the 47th-best high school player in his class as he entered college. He was rated a three-star recruit by both Rivals.com and 247Sports.com.

College recruiting
Name	Hometown	School	Height	Weight	Commit date
Cliff Clinkscales; PG	Ocala, FL	Shores Christian (FL)	6 ft 1 in (1.85 m)	165 lb (75 kg)	Apr 30, 2004
Cliff Clinkscales; PG	Recruit ratings: Scout: Rivals: 247Sports:				
Overall recruit ranking:
Note: In many cases, Scout, Rivals, 247Sports, On3, and ESPN may conflict in their listings of height and weight.; In these cases, the average was taken. ESPN grades are on a 100-point scale.; Sources: "2004 Team Ranking". Rivals.

== College career ==
University of Louisville, University of Florida, and University of Maryland were among the schools that showed an interest in Clinkscales as he approached college. He made multiple unofficial visits to Florida State, which was his first choice; however, the team did not offer him an athletic scholarship because of his low test scores. Once he improved his scores, Clinkscales caught the attention of more schools, including Baylor University and St. John's University in his hometown.

On May 7, 2004, Clinkscales announced his decision to play for the DePaul Blue Demons, noting that it would soon be a part of the Big East Conference, which provided him the opportunity to play at Madison Square Garden. The school's urban environment also prompted his decision. Blue Demons head coach Dave Leitao praised the new signee, saying, "Cliff is a true point guard who brings speed, athleticism, and quickness that we will need in our program."

=== Freshman ===
On November 20, 2004, Clinkscales made his collegiate debut with the Blue Demons by scoring one point and recording two assists in 14 minutes against Bowling Green. He soon became popular among DePaul basketball fans, and was nicknamed "The Colonel". On December 6, Clinkscales helped DePaul defeat IUPUI with 7 points and a team-high 12 assists. Clinkscales commented about his style of play, "The best thing I can do is pass. I really don't have to look at them (my team members). I just tell them to be ready." On December 18 he put up 13 assists, along with 7 points and 3 steals, to help beat UIC. It was Clinkscales' first career start, as he substituted for Drake Diener. In a win over Old Dominion on January 2, 2005, he replaced Sammy Mejía and scored nine points for his best scoring performance of the season. Clinkscales recorded six assists and a season-high four rebounds in the contest. He closed the season averaging 2.5 points, 3.4 assists, and 0.9 rebounds in 15 minutes per game. Clinkscales finished the season with an assist-to-turnover ratio of 2.31, the third-best in Conference USA and the best on his team. He became the fifth DePaul freshman ever to break the 100-assist barrier.

=== Sophomore ===
In Clinkscales' sophomore season, DePaul moved from Conference USA to the Big East Conference and hired Jerry Wainwright as head coach. Clinkscales debuted in a 60–75 loss to Bradley on November 19, 2005. He scored three points and passed for a team-high six assists but also had five turnovers. Clinkscales scored a then-career-best 11 points, as well as four assists and no turnovers, on December 31 vs. FIU. He made two three-pointers and five free throws in the game, both of which would be season highs. On January 21, 2006, Clinkscales had a season-best six assists in a one-point loss to Providence. Despite spending 38 minutes on the court, he only attempted four field goals. For the season, he averaged 3.2 points, 2.5 assists, and 1.1 rebounds in 19.5 minutes per game.

=== Junior ===
As a junior, Clinkscales regressed statistically in minutes per game and in his averages for points, assists, and rebounds. He played four minutes in DePaul's season-opening loss to Bradley on November 11, 2006, but recorded no statistics. On November 17, in a win against Eastern Illinois, Clinkscales finished with a season-high three steals. He recorded his first point on November 20, posting two points and three assists in 13 minutes off the bench vs. Kentucky at the Maui Invitational Tournament. In the following round of the event, in a victory over Chaminade, he had two steals and a season-best 13 assists. Clinkscales came off the bench against Rhode Island at the Ryan Center to score six points, the most in the season, on December 16. He replicated the scoring feat on December 29 vs. Northwestern State, along with nine assists. His team ended up defeating their opponents by 30 points, also pushed by a 40-point performance by Sammy Mejía. Following an early loss at the 2007 National Invitation Tournament (NIT), he capped the season playing 12 minutes per game and averaging 1.4 points, 2.3 assists, and 1.2 rebounds per contest.

=== Senior ===
Heading into the following season, the Blue Demons lacked both leadership and talent at the point guard position. Clinkscales hoped to assume the role as a leader, saying, "I think that's my job. I'm going to do that, regardless 40 minutes or two minutes. I'm going to try to help the guys out, from the bench or on the court." His development impressed Jerry Wainwright, who became more comfortable with giving him more playing time. Clinkscales began his final season at DePaul with a 12-point loss to Creighton on November 9, 2007. After playing 21 minutes off the bench, he had five points, two assists, two turnovers, and a season-high three steals. Heading into late December, in the midst of multiple injuries to his teammates, Clinkscales played more and frequently appeared in the Blue Demons' starting lineup. On January 3, 2008, while playing a career-high 39 minutes against Villanova, he scored a season-best 12 points and added eight assists with two turnovers. Clinkscales was effective once again in his team's January 16 rematch with Villanova, as he finished with 11 assists – the most he would record as a senior. Despite his passing efforts, the team was unable to beat the Wildcats, and lost 69–76. Against Seton Hall on February 23, Clinkscales led his team with eight assists and two steals. He faced Notre Dame on March 2, having eight assists, four rebounds, and one turnover. As his senior season ended, he was averaging 3.0 points, 1.2 rebounds, and 4.1 assists in 25.9 minutes per game. He led NCAA Division I with an assist-to-turnover ratio of 3.62.

== Professional career ==
=== 2008–2009 season ===
On November 7, 2008, Clinkscales was selected as the seventh pick of the ninth round in the 2008 NBA Development League Draft by the Erie BayHawks. He made his official professional debut with the BayHawks on November 28, scoring 12 points to go along with four rebounds and three assists in a loss to the Fort Wayne Mad Ants. On December 11, Clinkscales recorded his first double-double with 10 points and a team-high 11 assists, helping his team defeat the Iowa Energy. In a loss to the Sioux Falls Skyforce later in the season, he had a career-high 13 assists. Throughout his initial stint with the BayHawks, Clinkscales emerged as a reliable passer and played in nine games. After 43 games, he averaged 7.3 points and 5.3 assists, ranking 11th in the league in the latter category.

"(Jeff Trepagnier) was great. He was a professional. But there were way too may reasons not to do this. Clinkscales was a guy we liked from when we played them early in the season."

— Clay Moser on waiving Jeff Trepagnier and signing Clinkscales

Towards the end of the season, on March 30, 2009, Clinkscales was acquired from the player pool by the Rio Grande Valley Vipers of the D-League. To make room for him in their roster, the Vipers had to waive veteran Jeff Trepagnier. Head coach Clay Moser described Clinkscales' arrival as a boon to the team, saying, "We like Cliff's ability to get into the middle of the lane and create shots for others." Clinkscales was expected to join the Vipers as the backup point guard to Jared Jordan. He only played 12 minutes in his debut with the team, with zero points and three assists against the Utah Flash on April 1. He capped the season with a double-double of 12 points and ten assists vs. the Austin Spurs. By the end of the season, he was averaging 7.2 points, 5.3 assists, and 2.4 rebounds.

=== 2009–2010 season ===
Following his brief stint with the BayHawks, and subsequent signing by the Vipers, Clinkscales was eventually named on the latter's training camp roster. On November 17, 2009, he was cut from the roster during preseason. As a result, he reunited with the Erie BayHawks in mid-December. In his first appearance after rejoining the Bayhawks, he recorded nine points, seven assists, and four rebounds in a loss to the Iowa Energy on December 19. In another game vs. Iowa Energy that month, Clinkscales scored 14 points and notched a season-best 16 assists. Despite his strong passing numbers, he was criticized for being a poor jump shooter. After 39 games in the season, he averaged 5.1 points, 5.1 assists, and 1.6 rebounds per game. That season, he finished six different games with ten or more assists.

=== 2013–2014 season ===
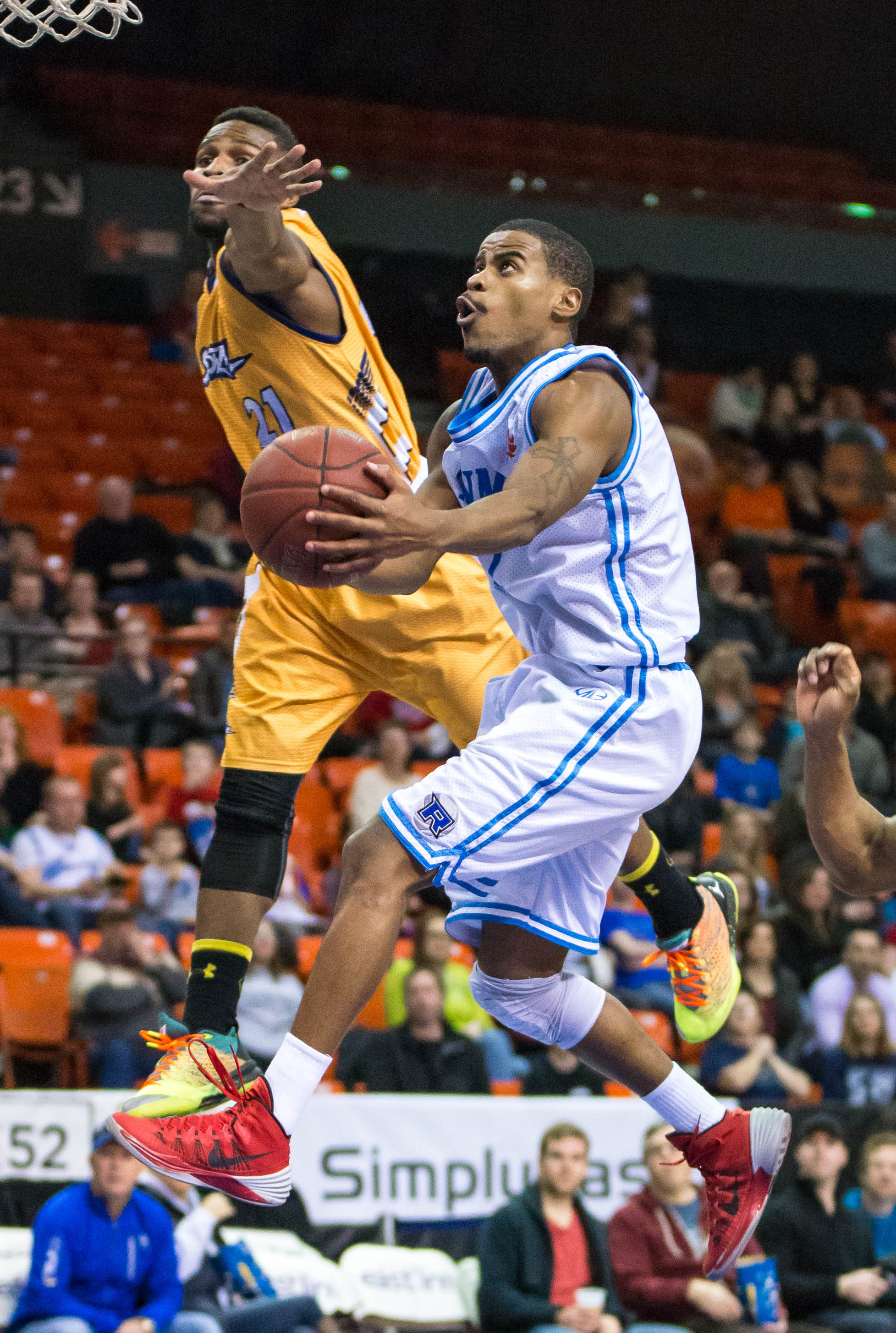
Clinkscales (right) drives to the rim in 2014.

After leaving the D-League, Clinkscales signed in 2013 with the Panama City Breeze of the semi-professional American Basketball League (ABL), with no indication that he joined any other team since his tenure with the BayHawks. On February 16, 2013, he scored 12 points with two three-pointers in a loss to the Emerald Coast Knights. While with the Breeze, Clinkscales (and his teammates) endured financial and domestic difficulties. He lived with five other teammates in a duplex house in Bay County, Florida. Because of financial issues, the league failed to pay the players—with Clinkscales solely receiving a check of $400—and canceled several games on its schedule. Later in the season, the players' duplex was supposedly leased by Breeze's head coach, Ty Fisher. A local broker filed a civil lawsuit against Fisher to evict the players, and county sheriff deputies soon forced them to leave the house. While living in the area, the players received aid from a local resident, Vonda Gainer, who they met at a Dollar Tree store. Gainer gave them food and washed their clothes. Despite their poor living conditions, the players failed to receive any aid by the league, with no contact or assurance from league CEO Steve Haney.

In February 2014, shortly after his time with the Breeze, Clinkscales joined the Halifax Rainmen of the National Basketball League of Canada (NBL) for the remainder of the 2013–14 season. In his first game for the Rainmen on February 11, he had six points, four rebounds, and nine assists against the Island Storm. Clinkscales scored a season-high 22 points along with 11 assists in a playoff win over the Saint John Mill Rats on March 7. In the following game vs. the Mill Rats on March 9, he set the NBL Canada postseason record with 18 assists in a single game. He finished the series with a total of 52 assists—the most in a four-game playoff series in league history. In the following round against the Storm, Clinkscales accumulated 68 assists, an NBL Canada record for a six-game series. He finished the season averaging 11 points, 9.8 assists, and 3.3 rebounds.

On April 20, 2014, Clinkscales represented the Atlantic Division at the NBL Canada All-Star Game in Charlottetown, Prince Edward Island. He finished with four points, two rebounds, and a game-high 15 assists, as his team defeated the Central Division.

=== 2014–2015 season ===
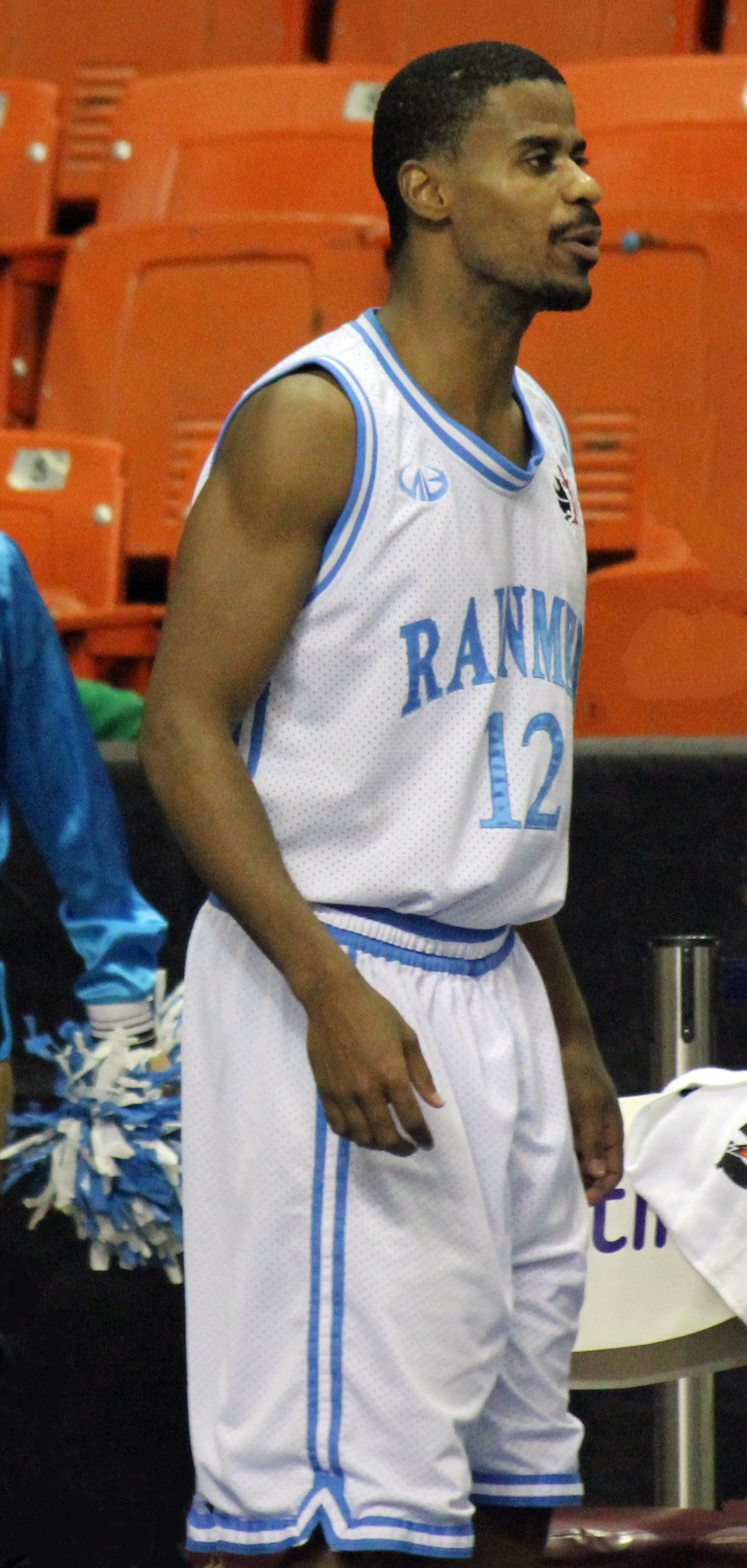
Clinkscales with the Rainmen in 2014

On May 14, 2014, Clinkscales was announced as one of six protected players on the Rainmen roster for the upcoming season, meaning that he could not be approached by any other NBL Canada team. On June 23, Clinkscales re-signed with the Rainmen for the 2014–15 season. The team, which parted ways with their head coach Craig Hodges, aimed to return many of its players from the previous season, and Rainmen owner Andre Levingston labelled Clinkscales as having been one of his priorities to keep on the team. On November 7, the Rainmen lost their season opener to the Moncton Miracles, 113–117, with Clinkscales accounting for nine points and eight assists. He had a double-double in a win over their follow-up with the Miracles on November 23, recording ten points and a team-high ten assists off the bench. On November 29, he notched 14 points and 8 assists vs. the Island Storm. As a point guard, Clinkscales scored a season-best 16 points against the Storm on February 26, 2015. In a postseason victory vs. the Miracles on March 8, he had a season-high 12 assists.

The Rainmen went on to qualify for the 2015 Finals against the Windsor Express. In their Game 1 defeat, Clinkscales committed three fouls within the first 12 minutes, but still managed to score 13 points. The series featured several physical and verbal altercations, and after it was tied at three games apiece, the Rainmen chose to forfeit the deciding seventh game. Prior to the contest, a brawl occurred between members of both sides. The league fined Clinkscales, along with ten of his teammates, $5,000 each for poor sportsmanship on the court. They were suspended indefinitely from the NBL Canada during the investigation. Commenting on the incident, Clinkscales later explained, "We practice hard against each other, we beat each other up, but there's a difference between being physical and dirty and hurting people." The league fined players, coaches, and teams a total of $90,000, and the Rainmen ultimately collapsed after facing bankruptcy. Clinkscales ended the season averaging 6.6 points, 5.9 assists, and 1.4 steals per game.

=== 2015–2016 season ===
For the 2015–2016 season, the Rainmen reformed under new ownership as the Halifax Hurricanes. Levingston remained the team's general manager. Clinkscales returned to the Halifax team, but he had to play with mostly new teammates and a new coach in Hugo López. Clinkscales eventually assumed the position of team captain during the season.

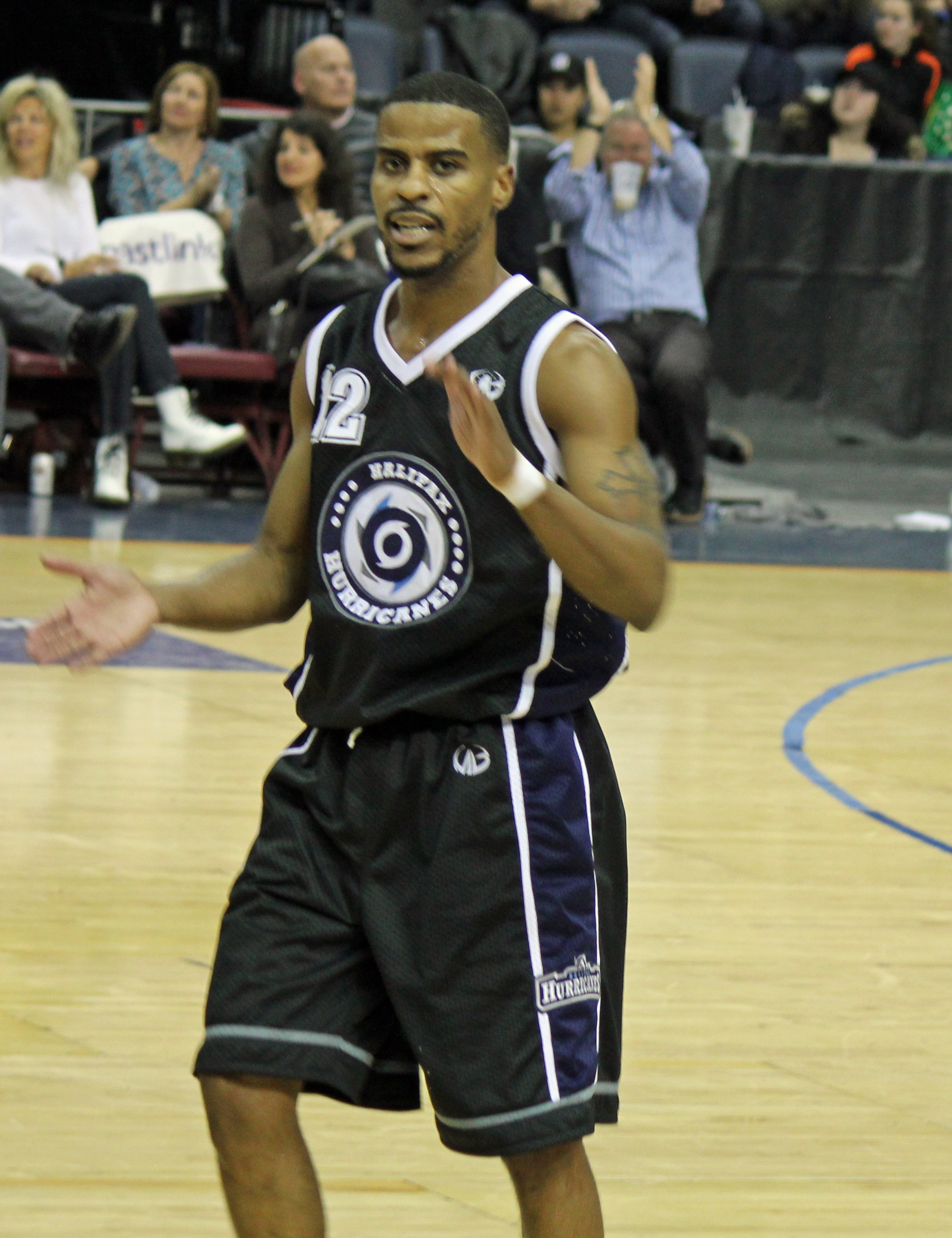
Clinkscales with the Hurricanes in February 2016

In the Hurricanes' regular season opener on Boxing Day 2015, Clinkscales added 13 points to help overcome the Moncton Miracles. He went on to break the double-digit scoring mark on January 23, 2016, in a victory against the Island Storm, when he had ten points and a game-high seven assists. On January 28, Clinkscales had his first double-double of the season, with a season-best 18 points and 10 assists in a loss to the Saint John Mill Rats. The Hurricanes were unable to rally from a 15-point fourth-quarter deficit. Clinkscales had another double-double on February 14 against the Orangeville A's, recording ten points and ten assists to push Halifax to a 125–89 win. He notched four steals, which would be a season high. On March 10, playing point guard, he scored 18 points once again, to go along with 10 assists, as the Hurricanes captured only their second win of the season, over the Mill Rats. Two games later, on March 18, Clinkscales recorded 10 points, 16 assists, and 7 rebounds – season bests for the latter two categories. His team won the game in overtime against the A's. Halifax entered the playoffs with a league-best 29–11 record, and they eventually returned to the NBL Canada Finals. On June 14, the Hurricanes won the championship over the London Lightning, prevailing in the series 4–3. Clinkscales scored nine points and passed a team-high nine assists in the victory. His role as a leader within the squad was evidenced by his directing of the crowd at the Scotiabank Centre. He remarked, "It feels great to get it with this group of guys." Clinkscales finished the season averaging 6.9 points, 8.0 assists, 2.5 rebounds, and 1.4 steals per game. In mid-August 2016, he announced that he would not return to the Hurricanes during the 2016–17 season; he considered beginning a coaching career.

=== 2016–2017 season ===
Despite his previous claims, Clinkscales re-signed with the Hurricanes for the 2016–17 season on October 18, 2016, having been persuaded to make the decision by newly hired head coach Kevin Keathley. Clinkscales said, "I am very excited to be returning to Halifax. I love the city and all of our supporters. I'm ready to work hard and build a team to defend our title with Coach Keathley. Da General is back!" Keathley was replaced by Mike Leslie by the start of the season. On December 26, in his season debut, Clinkscales scored six points, grabbed five rebounds, and passed for a team-high five assists to defeat the Moncton Miracles. In a game on January 12, 2017, vs. the Island Storm, he scored no points but recorded 13 assists. Clinkscales and the Hurricanes ultimately made it to the NBL Canada Finals before losing to the London Lightning in six games. Clinkscales was named to the All-NBL Canada Second Team at the end of the season with the league stating "Nine Hurricanes had more points than Clinkscales this season, but all can credit much of their scoring to the savvy point guard, who ranked second in NBLC with 300 assists while executing with a league-leading 4.48 assist-to-turnover rate. He had 11 double-digit assist games."

=== 2017–2018 season ===
Clinkscales was one of several players on the team who returned to the Hurricanes with the hope of again contending for the NBL Canada championship. He was happy to see so many returning players, commenting, "our coaching staff and owners did a great job of bringing the guys back, and these guys are pretty good". He believed he had ample opportunities to get assists because of his teammates, describing some of the returning members of his team as, "We have Ta'Quan Zimmerman who is one of the best shooters in the league, we got Mike Poole one of the best shooters in the league, we have Antoine Mason who is one of the best scorers in the league, we have Billy White who commands a double-team every night, so is one of the best players in the league. With those guys around it makes it easy for me and I just try to get them the ball in the right spots where they are comfortable." Clinkscales had a season-high 20 points with six three-pointers on March 6 against the St. John's Edge. He had 11 games with double-digit assists, including a season-best 15 in a loss to the Saint John Riptide on January 18. Clinkscales recorded double-digit rebounds for the first and only time in his NBL Canada career on February 25 with 10 against the Moncton Magic. For the second consecutive season, the Halifax Hurricanes lost to the London Lightning in the NBL Canada Finals, this time in a winner-take-all Game 7. Clinkscales had 14 points and 14 assists in the decisive loss.

=== 2018–2019 season ===
The 2018–19 season turned out to be the last full season of Clinkscales's playing career. Along with Poole and Tyrone Watson, he was one of only three players to return to the Hurricanes. Coach Mike Leslie also returned to the team. Clinkscales described his role on the team as, "I bring leadership and experience and as one of the oldest players on the team so my job is to be an extension of my coaches and make the game easier for not only my coaches but also my team." He set a franchise record for assists in a game with 18 on December 19 against the Windsor Express. Overall though, Clinkscales's season averages declined to 5.2 points per game and 6.3 assists per game, respectively the lowest and second-lowest averages of his NBL Canada career. Although the Hurricanes finished the season with the second-best record in the league, they were second in their division behind the Moncton Magic and lost to the Magic in the NBL Canada Division Finals in another Game 7.

=== 2019–2020 season ===
Before the 2019–20 season began, Mike Leslie was promoted to team president and general manager. The vacant coaching position was filled by Ryan Marchand. Clinkscales set a new career-high with 27 points on March 5 against the Sudbury Five, breaking his own franchise record with 19 assists in the same game. A week later, the rest of the season was suspended due to the COVID-19 pandemic and ultimately cancelled. At the time, the Hurricanes had a losing record of 8–16. Nonetheless, Clinkscales was averaging 10.1 assists per game, the best of his NBL Canada career. He had double-digit assists in 13 of his 24 games. Clinkscales earned Third Team All-NBL Canada honors. Before the season began, Clinkscales became the all-time assist leader in NBL Canada history.

== Coaching career ==
On December 24, 2021, Clinkscales was announced as an assistant coach for the KW Titans of the NBL Canada. He reached his decision to retire after the Hurricanes announced they would not come back after the pandemic-shortened 2019–20 season.

== Career statistics ==
Cited from RealGM

Legend
GP	Games played	GS	Games started	MPG	Minutes per game
FG%	Field goal percentage	3P%	3-point field goal percentage	FT%	Free throw percentage
RPG	Rebounds per game	APG	Assists per game	SPG	Steals per game
BPG	Blocks per game	PPG	Points per game	**Bold**	Career high

=== D-League ===
Year	Team	GP	GS	MPG	FG%	3P%	FT%	RPG	APG	SPG	BPG	PPG
2008–09	Erie BayHawks	**43**	9	**28.6**	.451	**.214**	.605	**2.4**	**5.3**	**1.0**	**.2**	**7.3**
2008–09	Rio Grande Valley Vipers	5	0	19.4	**.500**	.000	.000	1.8	5.0	.6	.0	6.8
2009–10	Erie BayHawks	39	**14**	20.9	.424	.111	**.676**	1.6	5.1	.5	.1	5.1
Career		87	23	24.6	.444	.174	.628	2.0	5.2	.8	.2	6.3

=== NBL Canada ===
†	Denotes seasons in which Clinkscales won the NBL Canada Finals

Year	Team	GP	GS	MPG	FG%	3P%	FT%	RPG	APG	SPG	BPG	PPG
2013–14	Halifax Rainmen	18	16	**43.3**	.415	.250	**.786**	**3.3**	9.8	**1.8**	.2	**11.0**
2014–15	Halifax Rainmen	45	14	20.9	**.433**	**.431**	.576	2.0	5.9	1.4	.1	6.6
2015–16†	Halifax Hurricanes	53	43	29.4	.422	.354	.704	2.6	8.0	1.4	.3	6.9
2016–17	Halifax Hurricanes	**55**	**55**	29.5	.392	.383	**.786**	2.9	8.4	1.4	.1	5.7
2017–18	Halifax Hurricanes	54	54	32.4	.399	.383	.743	2.9	7.5	1.2	.2	8.0
2018–19	Halifax Hurricanes	52	52	29.8	.375	.379	.588	2.1	6.3	.9	.2	5.2
2019–20	Halifax Hurricanes	24	24	36.9	.426	.391	.769	4.0	**10.1**	1.1	**.6**	7.4

=== College ===
Cited from RealGM

Year	Team	GP	GS	MPG	FG%	3P%	FT%	RPG	APG	SPG	BPG	PPG
2004–05	DePaul	31	2	15.0	.324	.048	.680	0.4	3.4	.3	.1	8.3
2005–06	DePaul	27	10	19.5	.377	.346	.792	1.2	2.5	.3	.1	3.2
2006–07	DePaul	34	4	12.0	.450	.375	.438	1.2	2.3	.5	.0	1.4
2007–08	DePaul	30	22	25.9	.392	.333	.629	1.2	4.1	.7	.0	3.0

== Personal life ==
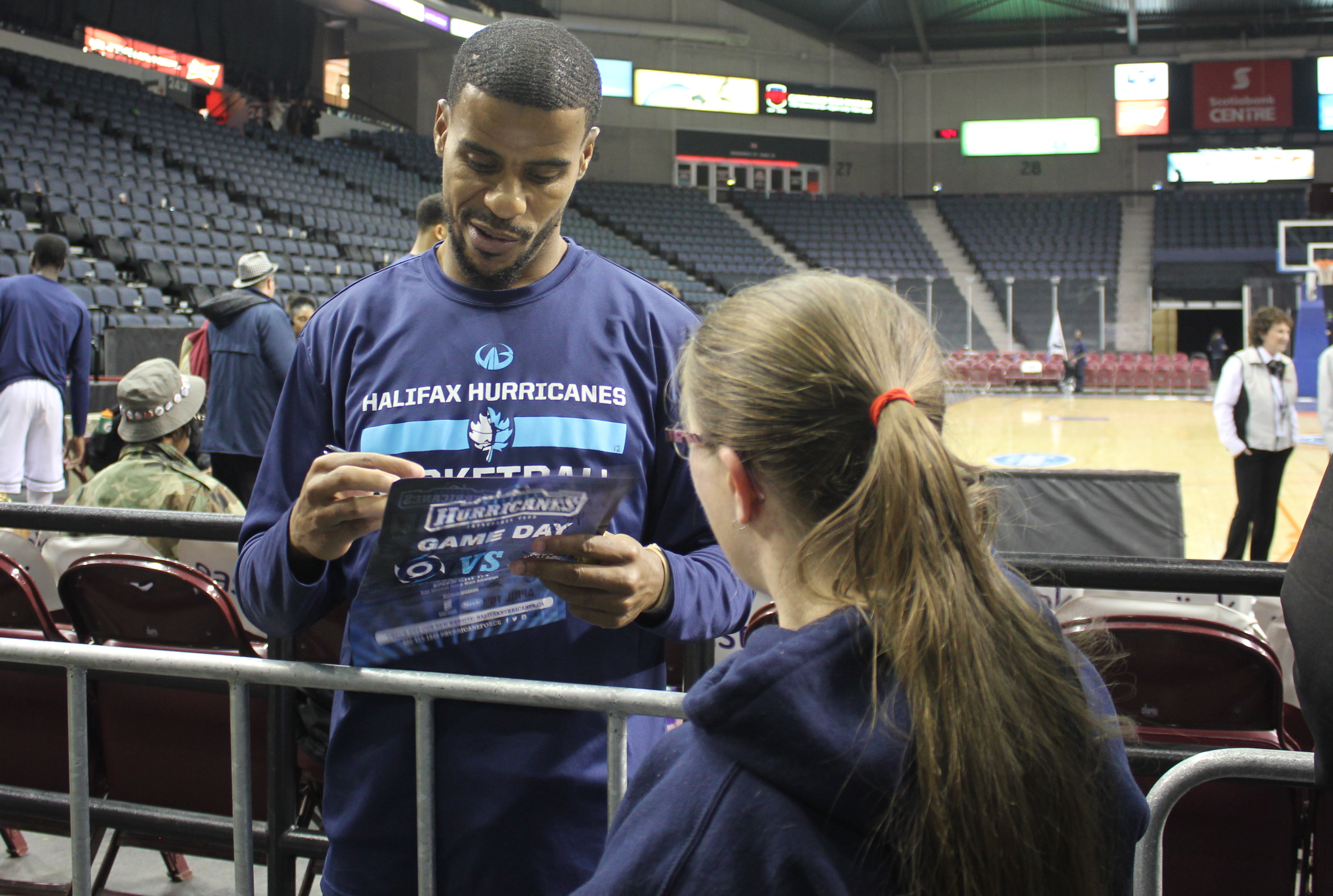
Clinkscales signs an autograph after a game in 2016.

Clinkscales has played streetball with the Sean Bell All-Stars against local teams in New York City, acting as the starting point guard. The team was named after an unarmed New York native who was shot 50 times by three police officers on November 25, 2006. The Sean Bell All-Stars won the Trayvon Martin Invitational in August 2013, with a team that featured Clinkscales and Tobias Harris, in Harlem, New York. The event raised over $5,000 for the Trayvon Martin Foundation and was attended by NBA players Kyrie Irving, Tyreke Evans, and future NBA commissioner Adam Silver. At the invitational, Clinkscales spoke out against police brutality, saying, "Kids everywhere are getting shot and murdered, whether it's in Jamaica, the Bronx, Chicago. It seems like it never goes right when it comes to the law, but the message to the kids is that if you go hard on the court you have to go hard in the classroom." In 2015, he competed for the All-Stars at The Basketball Tournament, in a team that featured Delroy James and Zamal Nixon and was managed by Raheem Wiggins. In a victory against Team No Excuses in 2015, Clinkscales scored 11 points. As well as playing streetball, he has coached youth basketball in South Jamaica, Queens.
