= 2017–18 NBL Canada season =

- League: National Basketball League of Canada
- Sport: Basketball
- Duration: November 18, 2017 – April 2, 2018
- Games: 40
- Teams: 10
- Total attendance: 400,811 (2,004 per game)

Draft
- Top draft pick: ?
- Picked by: ?

Regular Season
- Top seed: Halifax Hurricanes
- Season MVP: ?
- Top scorer: ?

Playoffs
- Atlantic champions: Halifax Hurricanes
- Central champions: London Lightning

Finals
- Champions: London Lightning
- Runners-up: Halifax Hurricanes
- Finals MVP: Garrett Williamson

NBL Canada seasons
- ← 2016–17 2018–19 →

The 2017–18 NBL Canada season was the seventh season of the National Basketball League of Canada (NBLC). The regular season ran November 18, 2017 to April 2, 2018.

== League changes ==
After two years as league commissioner, Dave Magley left the league to found North American Premier Basketball. He was replaced on an interim basis by London Lightning owner and league president Vito Frijia.

After years of league ownership, the Moncton Miracles were folded to make way for an expansion team under new ownership called the Moncton Magic. The league also awarded expansion franchises in St. John's, Newfoundland and Labrador, and Sudbury, Ontario. However, the Sudbury ownership group delayed their launch in the league until 2019. The Orangeville A's folded in the Central Division, leaving the league with six teams in the Atlantic region and four in the Central. As a result, the new St. John's Edge were scheduled to play in the Central Division.

=== Offseason coaching changes ===
- The Cape Breton Highlanders hired longtime NBLC head coach Rob Spon away from the Saint John Riptide, replacing their fired inaugural head coach Dean Murray and the interim Ben Resner.
- The Island Storm hired Tim Kendrick to replace longtime Storm head coach, Joe Salerno.
- The London Lightning hired Keith Vassell, former Niagara College head coach and the interim head coach of the Niagara River Lions the previous season. During the 2017 playoffs, then-Lightning head coach Kyle Julius notified ownership he would not return for the following season.
- The Moncton Magic hired Joe Salerno as its inaugural head coach. Salerno had coached the previous season for the Island Storm.
- The Niagara River Lions hired Joe Raso as its permanent head coach after Grâce Lokole stepped down during the previous season and Keith Vassell coached the rest of the season.
- The Saint John Riptide hired Nelson Terroba to replace Rob Spon.
- The St. John's Edge hired Jeff Dunlap as its inaugural head coach.

=== Midseason coaching changes ===
- The KW Titans released Serge Langis on 25 February 2018 after a 5–22 record, and replaced him with former Titans' player Cavell Johnson.

== Teams ==
2017-18 National Basketball League of Canada
| Division | Team | City | Arena | Capacity |
| Atlantic | Cape Breton Highlanders | Sydney, Nova Scotia | Centre 200 | 5,000 |
| Atlantic | Halifax Hurricanes | Halifax, Nova Scotia | Scotiabank Centre | 10,500 |
| Atlantic | Island Storm | Charlottetown, Prince Edward Island | Eastlink Centre | 4,000 |
| Atlantic | Moncton Magic | Moncton, New Brunswick | Moncton Coliseum | 6,554 |
| Atlantic | Saint John Riptide | Saint John, New Brunswick | Harbour Station | 6,603 |
| Central | KW Titans | Kitchener, Ontario | Kitchener Memorial Auditorium | 7,312 |
| Central | London Lightning | London, Ontario | Budweiser Gardens | 9,000 |
| Central | Niagara River Lions | St. Catharines, Ontario | Meridian Centre | 4,030 |
| Central | St. John's Edge | St. John's, Newfoundland and Labrador | Mile One Centre | 6,750 |
| Central | Windsor Express | Windsor, Ontario | WFCU Centre | 6,500 |

=== Map of teams ===
Atlantic Division Central Division

== Regular season ==
Standings as of 2 April 2018:

| Atlantic Division | GP | W | L | PCT | GB | Div |
|---|---|---|---|---|---|---|
| z — Halifax Hurricanes | 40 | 28 | 12 | .700 | — | 21–8 |
| x — Moncton Magic | 40 | 23 | 17 | .575 | 5 | 16–13 |
| x — Saint John Riptide | 40 | 20 | 20 | .500 | 8 | 15–16 |
| x — Island Storm | 40 | 19 | 21 | .475 | 9 | 15–16 |
| Cape Breton Highlanders | 40 | 13 | 27 | .325 | 15 | 9–23 |

| Central Division | GP | W | L | PCT | GB | Div |
|---|---|---|---|---|---|---|
| c — London Lightning | 40 | 27 | 13 | .675 | — | 23–8 |
| x — St. John's Edge | 40 | 25 | 15 | .625 | 2 | 20–11 |
| x — Windsor Express | 40 | 20 | 20 | .500 | 7 | 16–14 |
| x — Niagara River Lions | 40 | 17 | 23 | .425 | 10 | 11–19 |
| KW Titans | 40 | 8 | 32 | .200 | 19 | 6–23 |

Notes

- z – Clinched home court advantage for the entire playoffs
- c – Clinched home court advantage for the division playoffs
- x – Clinched playoff spot

=== Attendance ===
As of games played 2 April 2018

| Pos | Team | Total | High | Low | Average | Change |
|---|---|---|---|---|---|---|
| 1 | London Lightning | 84,081 | 8,236 | 1,534 | 4,204 | −19.3% |
| 2 | St. John's Edge^{1} | 68,028 | 4,803 | 1,821 | 3,401 | n/a |
| 3 | Niagara River Lions | 41,085 | 3,941 | 1,582 | 2,054 | +17.2% |
| 4 | Halifax Hurricanes | 39,164 | 3,667 | 1,032 | 1,958 | +1.7% |
| 5 | Saint John Riptide | 37,670 | 5,392 | 1,245 | 1,884 | +1.5% |
| 6 | Island Storm | 37,503 | 3,111 | 1,454 | 1,875 | −3.1% |
| 7 | Cape Breton Highlanders | 27,078 | 4,236 | 950 | 1,354 | −8.2% |
| 8 | KW Titans | 25,289 | 2,768 | 563 | 1,264 | −3.1% |
| 9 | Moncton Magic | 21,418 | 2,186 | 562 | 1,071 | −30.0% |
| 10 | Windsor Express | 19,495 | 1,451 | 804 | 975 | −5.7% |
| | League total | 400,811 | 8,236 | 562 | 2,004 | +9.4% |

Notes:
1: New team.

== Playoffs ==
Division Semifinals
A1 | Halifax | 3
A4 | Island | 1
Atlantic Division
A2 | Moncton | 3
A3 | Saint John | 2
C1 | London | 3
C4 | Niagara | 1
Central Division
C2 | St. John's | 3
C3 | Windsor | 0

Division Finals
A1 | Halifax | 4
A2 | Moncton | 1
C1 | London | 4
C2 | St. John's | 2

NBL Canada Finals
A1 | Halifax | 3
C1 | London | 4

Bold Series winner
Italic Team with home-court advantage

=== NBL Canada Finals ===
May 6
7:00 pm

Box score

London Lightning 106, Halifax Hurricanes 119
Scoring by quarter: 30–36, 20–20, 29–32, 27–31
| Pts: Doug Herring, Jr. 26; Rebs: Julian Boyd 14; Asts: Doug Herring, Jr. 9 | Pts: Tyrone Watson, Billy White 29 each Rebs: Rhamel Brown, Tyrone Watson 12 each Asts: Cliff Clinkscales 6 |
Halifax leads series 1–0

Scotiabank Centre, Halifax
Attendance: 1,940

May 8
7:00 pm

Box score

London Lightning 91, Halifax Hurricanes 100
Scoring by quarter: 15–18, 26–23, 20–29, 30–30
| Pts: Garrett Williamson 21; Rebs: Julian Boyd 14; Asts: Doug Herring, Jr. 7 | Pts: Billy White 23; Rebs: Rhamel Brown, Tyrone Watson, Billy White 10 each Asts: Cliff Clinkscales 8 |
Halifax leads series 2–0

Scotiabank Centre, Halifax
Attendance: 2,681

May 10
7:00 pm

Box score

Halifax Hurricanes 100, London Lightning 110
Scoring by quarter: 24–27, 27–30, 27–24, 22–29
| Pts: Antoine Mason 22; Rebs: Rhamel Brown 12; Asts: Cliff Clinkscales 9 | Pts: Garrett Williamson 27; Rebs: Julian Boyd 15; Asts: Doug Herring, Jr., Garrett Williamson 10 each |
Halifax leads series 2–1

Budweiser Gardens, London
Attendance: 2,185

May 12
7:00 pm

Box score

Halifax Hurricanes 114, London Lightning 122 (OT)
Scoring by quarter: 24–26, 29–29, 24–33, 29–18, Overtime: 8–16
| Pts: Antoine Mason 36; Rebs: Rhamel Brown 11; Asts: Cliff Clinkscales 8 | Pts: Maurice Bolden 38; Rebs: Julian Boyd 14; Asts: Garrett Williamson 13 |
London ties series 2–2

Budweiser Gardens, London
Attendance: 3,461

May 14
7:00 pm

Box score

Halifax Hurricanes 102, London Lightning 110
Scoring by quarter: 22–25, 26–35, 27–27, 27–23
| Pts: Tyrone Watson 32; Rebs: Tyrone Watson 10; Asts: Cliff Clinkscales 12 | Pts: Doug Herring, Jr. 27; Rebs: Julian Boyd 9 Asts: Garrett Williamson 10 |
London leads series 3–2

Budweiser Gardens, London
Attendance: 2,682

May 17
7:00 pm

Box score

London Lightning 101, Halifax Hurricanes 112
Scoring by quarter: 24–32, 29–23, 26–24, 22–33
| Pts: Garrett Williamson 27; Rebs: Julian Boyd; Asts: Doug Herring, Jr., Garrett Williamson 7 each | Pts: Antoine Mason 22; Rebs: Rhamel Brown 14; Asts: Antoine Mason, Tyrone Watson, Ta'Quan Zimmerman 5 each |
Halifax ties series 3–3

Scotiabank Centre, Halifax
Attendance: 1,875

May 18
7:00 pm

Box score

London Lightning 109, Halifax Hurricanes 101
Scoring by quarter: 32–24, 25–29, 28–31, 24–17
| Pts: Doug Herring, Jr. 29; Rebs: Julian Boyd, Garrett Williamson 8 each Asts: Doug Herring, Jr. 11 | Pts: Billy White 25; Rebs: Rhamel Brown 8 Asts: Cliff Clinkscales 14 |
London wins series 4–3

Scotiabank Centre, Halifax
Attendance: 2,744

== Draft ==
The 2017–18 NBL Canada Draft and Combine was held on October 20–22. The St. John's Edge selected Aaron Williams first.

| Rnd. | Pick | Player | Nationality | Team | School / club team |
|---|---|---|---|---|---|
| 1 | 1 | Aaron Williams | United States | St. John's Edge | Chicago State |
| 1 | 2 | Zachary Valliere | United States | Island Storm | Fitchburg State |
| 1 | 3 | Duke Mondy | United States | Cape Breton Highlanders | Oakland |
| 1 | 4 | Steven Toyloy | United States | Moncton Magic | Cincinnati |
| 1 | 5 | Matthew Hart | United States | Niagara River Lions | George Washington |
| 1 | 6 | Torrence Dyck | United States | Island Storm | Daemen College |
| 1 | 7 | Scottie McRae | United States | Windsor Express | Albany |
| 1 | 8 | Cleon Roberts | United States | Saint John Riptide | La Salle |
| 1 | 9 | Andrew Hayles | United States | Windsor Express | Alabama State |
| 1 | 10 | Shawn Amiker | United States | Halifax Hurricanes | Youngstown State |
| 1 | 11 | Bright Mensah | United States | London Lightning | William Paterson |
| 2 | 12 | Zach Gordon | United States | St. John's Edge | Cal Poly |
| 2 | 13 | Jean-Rony Cadot | Bahamas | Windsor Express | TCU |
| 2 | 14 | Damarcus Harrison | United States | Cape Breton Highlanders | Clemson |
| 2 | 15 | Willie Connor | United States | KW Titans | Buffalo |
| 2 | 16 | Robert Ukawuba | United States | Windsor Express | NJIT |
| 2 | 17 | Georges Serresse | Canada | KW Titans | Laurentian |
| 2 | 18 | Kyle Steward | United States | Saint John Riptide | UMKC |
| 2 | 19 | James Johnson | United States | Windsor Express | Culver–Stockton |
| 2 | 20 | Daryl Hunter | United States | Halifax Hurricanes | |
| 2 | 21 | Boyd Vassell | Canada | London Lightning | St. Mary's |

== Awards ==
=== Player of the Week award ===
| For games in week ending | Atlantic Division | | Central Division | |
| For games in week ending | Player | Team | Player | Team |
|---|---|---|---|---|
| November 27, 2017 | Gabe Freeman | Saint John Riptide | Carl English | St. John's Edge |
| December 3, 2017 | Franklin Session | Island Storm | Charles Hinkle | St. John's Edge |
| December 10, 2017 | CJ Washington | Halifax Hurricanes | Sam Muldrow | Niagara River Lions |
| December 17, 2017 | Terry Thomas | Moncton Magic | Charles Hinkle (2) | St. John's Edge |
| December 24, 2017 | Duke Mondy | Cape Breton Highlanders | Ryan Anderson | London Lightning |
| December 31, 2017 | Antoine Mason | Halifax Hurricanes | Royce White | London Lightning |
| January 7, 2018 | Malcolm Miller | Saint John Riptide | Mo Bolden | London Lightning |
| January 14, 2018 | Gabe Freeman (2) | Saint John Riptide | Royce White (2) | London Lightning |
| January 21, 2018 | Bruce Massey | Cape Breton Highlanders | Guillaume Boucard | Niagara River Lions |
| January 28, 2018 | Corey Allmond | Moncton Magic | Logan Stutz | Windsor Express |
| February 4, 2018 | Billy White | Halifax Hurricanes | Derek Hall | KW Titans |
| February 11, 2018 | Terry Thomas (2) | Moncton Magic | Chad Frazier | Windsor Express |
| February 18, 2018 | Billy White (2) | Halifax Hurricanes | Ryan Anderson (2) | London Lightning |
| February 25, 2018 | Mike Poole | Halifax Hurricanes | Shaquille Keith | Windsor Express |
| March 4, 2018 | Franklin Session (2) | Island Storm | Carl English (2) | St. John's Edge |
| March 11, 2018 | Corey Allmond (2) | Moncton Magic | Kris Joseph | Niagara River Lions |
| March 18, 2018 | Du'Vaughn Maxwell | Island Storm | Jaylon Tate | Niagara River Lions |
| March 25, 2018 | Antoine Mason (2) | Halifax Hurricanes | Logan Stutz (2) | Windsor Express |
| April 2, 2018 | Malcolm Miller (2) | Saint John Riptide | Garrett Williamson | London Lightning |

=== Coach of the Month award ===
| Month | Player | Team |
|---|---|---|
| December | Jeff Dunlap | St. John's Edge |
| January | Keith Vassell | London Lightning |
| February | Mike Leslie | Halifax Hurricanes |
| March | Mike Leslie (2) | Halifax Hurricanes |

=== End-of-season awards ===
- Most Valuable Player: Carl English, St. John's Edge
- Canadian Player of the Year: Carl English, St. John's Edge
- Newcomer of the Year: Franklin Session, Island Storm
- Defensive Player of the Year: Du'Vaughn Maxwell, Island Storm
- Rookie of the Year: Jaylon Tate, Niagara River Lions
- Sixth Man of the Year: Ta'Quan Zimmerman, Halifax Hurricanes
- Coach of the Year: Mike Leslie, Halifax Hurricanes
