= Joe Salerno =

American basketball coach (born 1981)

Syria men's national basketball team
- Position: Head coach

Personal information
- Born: 1981 (age 44–45) Plattsburgh, New York

Career information
- High school: Montpelier (Montpelier, Vermont)
- College: Plattsburgh State; CC of Vermont
- Coaching career: 2008–present

Career history

Coaching
- 2008–2010: Vermont Frost Heaves (asst.)
- 2010: Vermont Frost Heaves
- 2011–2017: Summerside/Island Storm
- 2017–2020: Moncton Magic
- 2020–2022: Syria

Career highlights
- 3× NBL Canada Coach of the Year (2013, 2019, 2020); NBL Canada Champions (2019); All-time winningest Coach in NBL Canada history (208); 2x NBL Canada Atlantic Division All-Star team Head Coach; 3x NBL Canada Atlantic Division Champions(2013, 2014, 2019)

Joseph Salerno Jr. (born 1981) is an American professional basketball coach, currently serving as the head coach of the Syrian national team. He previously served as the head coach and general manager of player operations of the Moncton Magic also as the vice president of player personnel for the Island Storm for six seasons, leading them to a three Atlantic Division titles, and two appearances in the NBL Canada Finals. Prior to his time in Canada, Salerno served as the head coach for the Vermont Frost Heaves (Barre, VT) of the now defunct Premier Basketball League.

== Early life ==
Salerno was born in 1981 in Plattsburgh, New York. Raised in Barre, VT, he attended Montpelier High School in Montpelier, Vermont, where he excelled in both Basketball and Football, and graduated in 2000. In 2005, he earned a degree in liberal studies from the Community College of Vermont in Bennington, Vermont. He also attended college at the State University of New York at Plattsburgh in his birthplace.

== Coaching career ==
=== Early career ===
Salerno initially coached high school basketball at his alma mater Montepelier High School. He directed the Solons' varsity boys' team for two seasons and most notably led them to a Division II Final Four in 2009. Salerno was also the youngest coach to win the 29th VT/NH Merchants Bank Twin State Rotary Classic. In the summer of 2008, he spent time in the Netherlands, working at national basketball camps.

=== Vermont Frost Heaves ===
Salerno had his first experience coaching professional basketball with the Vermont Frost Heaves of the Premier Basketball League (PBL). He took an assistant coaching job in 2008 and was promoted to head coach in January 2010, after the team got off to an 0–3 start. He replaced Jeff Strohm, who was fired. In March 2009, Salerno was named PBL Coach of the Month. By the end of his stint with the Frost Heaves, he had an overall head coaching record of 14–8.

=== Summerside / Island Storm ===
Heading into the inaugural 2011–12 season of the National Basketball League of Canada (NBL), Salerno landed a coaching job with the Summerside Storm. He was named head coach and vice president of player personnel on August 17, 2011. Salerno went on to lead the Storm to back-to-back Atlantic Division championships in 2013 and 2014, and appearances in the NBL Canada Finals. Owner Duncan Shaw, who said, "Joe is a very bright, talented young coach. He fits us as an organization because he wants to be involved year-round, he wants to be here long term and he's a very exceptional basketball mind to take us to the next level."

=== Moncton Magic ===
In 2017, Salerno left the Storm to become the head coach and general manager is player operations of the new Moncton Magic. In his first three seasons as the head coach and general manager of player operations for the Moncton Magic, Coach Salerno has compiled a record of 85 wins to just 42 losses (.68%), to go along with an NBL Canada Championship in 2019, the first in the city of Moncton’s basketball history.

At 38 years old, Salerno entered his 11th season as a head coach at the professional level, after spending the previous nine in the National Basketball League of Canada. He is the only coach that has been in the NBL Canada since the league’s inception back in 2011, spending his first 6 seasons with the Island Storm before signing with the Moncton Magic in the summer of 2017.

The 2018–19 season was one of the ages, as Salerno and the Magic reached multiple milestones. A 10–0 start to the season was good enough for the 2nd best start in NBL Canada history, on their way to an impressive 27–13 regular season record (a franchise best) and the number one overall seed in the NBL Canada Playoffs. This marked Salerno’s 8 straight trip to the postseason. In the Magic’s first season at the newly opened Avenir Centre, the team totaled a 24–4 home record, which was an NBL Canada milestone for best home record, on their way to finishing the season 38–16. The Magic were dominant in the 2019 NBL Playoffs, putting together an impressive 11–3 record, sweeping two of the three playoff rounds (3–0 Saint John Riptide, 4–0 St. John’s Edge) on the way to the organization first Championship, as well as the first of Salerno’s career.

In the 2019–20 season, Salerno had won the coach of the month award in January and February, before the season was suspended on 12 March, due to the COVID-19 pandemic in Canada.

=== Syrian national team ===
In October 2020, Salerno was appointed as the head coach of the Syrian national team.

== Personal life ==
Salerno with his wife Darci has two children, Camden and Alexandra.
