= KW Titans =

Basketball team in Kitchener-Waterloo, Canada

- Founded: 2016
- History: KW Titans; 2016–present NBL Canada 2016–2023; BSL: 2023–2026
- Arena: Kitchener Memorial Auditorium
- Capacity: 7,312
- Location: Kitchener, Ontario (Waterloo Region)
- Team colours: Blue, black, white, silver
- Head coach: Cliff Clinkscales
- Ownership: David Schooley
- Website: kwtitans.com

KW Titans (formally known as Kitchener-Waterloo Titans Basketball Club) are a professional basketball team based in Regional Municipality of Waterloo that competes in the Basketball Super League. The team plays its home games at Kitchener Memorial Auditorium Complex. It was founded in 2016 by an ownership group made up of Ball Construction and Leon Martin, Jeff Berg and Brian Foster

== History ==
On June 28, 2016, National Basketball League of Canada announced an approved expansion team to represent the Regional Municipality of Waterloo while still in the process of negotiating a lease with Kitchener Memorial Auditorium Complex. A new ownership group was composed by several local businesses with the majority ownership going to Ball Construction and a minority stake held by Leon Martin, Jeff Berg and Brian Foster. Ball Construction's chief financial officer, Frank Schneider, was named team president in representing the ownership group in team dealings. The team name was determined through a contest and announced on July 29. On August 23, the team announced that they would play their home games at Kitchener Memorial Auditorium Complex, unveiled their new uniforms, named Serge Langis as their first coach, and announced their first player signings.

In the first game of their first season, the Titans lost to the Orangeville A's 110–105 at home. The team finished their season with 18 wins and 22 losses, finishing third in the Central Division. The team qualified for the playoffs but lost all three games in the first round to the Windsor Express.

The team opened their second season on November 18, 2017, against the Windsor Express with Serge Langis returning as the head coach. However, Langis was released during the season after a 5–22 record and replaced by former Titans' player Cavell Johnson.

The 2019–2020 season was curtailed before the postseason due to the onset of the COVID-19 pandemic and the following season was cancelled entirely. Before the 2021–22 season, head coach Johnson resigned from his coaching positions with the team due to other commitments. There was no season in 2020–2021 due to the ongoing pandemic lockdowns.

The 2021–2022 season finally got off the ground in February 2022 after another provincial COVID-19 Lockdown. This the best season in franchise history finishing with a .500 regular season winning percentage, the team went all the way to the NBLC Finals, ultimately losing to the London Lightning. Mel Kobe was hired as VP of Basketball Operations & General Manager and former Windsor Express assistant coach Neal Foreman as Head Coach and Director of Player Personnel.

2022–23 season: David and Kate Schooley purchased the team. Frank Schneider is back and Cliff Clinkscales is the head coach. The season for the Titans started more than five weeks after the rest of the league due to the late sale of the team.

All-star Weekend returned with the NBLC Allstars taking on The Basketball League (TBL) Allstars.

3 Titans were named to the NBLC team roster:

- Eric Ferguson – Also competed in 3pt competition
- Joel Kindred
- Chad Frazier

8 KW athletes were nominated for regular season individual awards. 4 of them came away with hardware.

Individual Award Nominees & Winners – 2022
Award name	KW Nominees	Winner	Reference
Newcomer of the Year	Eric Ferguson, Ron Artest III	Jeremey Harris (Sudbury 5)	
Rookie of the Year	Shakwon Barrett	Shakwon Barrett	
Most Improved Player of the Year	Joel Kindred, Jesse Jones	Joel Kindred	
6th Man of the Year	Darnell Landon	Terry Thomas (London Lightning)	
Defensive Player of the Year	Ty Walker, Joel Kindred	Ty Walker	
Canadian Player of the Year	Darnell Landon, Juwan Miller	Terry Thomas (London Lightning)	
Most Valuable Player	Eric Ferguson, Joel Kindred	Joel Kindred	

=== Basketball Super League (2023–2026) ===
on April 12, 2023, the The Basketball League president David Magley announced the creation of the Basketball Super League, promising a longer season, better player salary, and a higher level of play then the NBLC, the Titans announced as a founding team later that day and were joined by the remaining NBLC teams over the following weeks

in the Titans inaugural BSL campaign, led by returning coach Cliff Clinkscales the team finished with their first winning season in franchise history, finishing top of the standings with a 23–10 record. in the postseason they swept the Newfoundland Rouges in the semifinals before falling 3–1 in the championship series to the London Lightning

The team would return to the BSL finals in 2026 where they would fall 3–2 against the Sudbury Five

=== CEBL (2026–present) ===
On September 18, 2026, the team announced they would be stepping away from the BSL in order to pursue membership in the Canadian Elite Basketball League. if approved, the team would begin play in the CEBL for the 2027 season

== Season-by-season record ==
Season	Coach	Regular season				Post season			
Season	Coach	Won	Lost	Win %	Finish	Won	Lost	Win %	Result
2016–17	Serge Langis	18	22	.450	3rd	0	3	.000	Lost in Division Semifinals
2017–18	Serge Langis; Cavell Johnson	8	32	.200	5th	Did not qualify			
2018–19	Cavell Johnson	19	21	.475	4th	5	6	.455	Lost in Division Finals
2019–20	Cavell Johnson	9	16	.360	Season curtailed by the COVID-19 pandemic				
2021–22	Neal Foreman	12	12	.500	3rd	3	4	.429	Lost in League Finals
2022–23	Cliff Clinkscales	9	15	.375	4th	0	3	.000	Lost in Division Finals
2023–24	Cliff Clinkscales	23	10	.667	1st	4	3	.571	Lost in League Finals
2024–25	Cliff Clinkscales	18	10	.643	3rd	2	3	.400	Lost in League Semifinals
2025–26	Cliff Clinkscales	19	7	.713	1st	5	4	.555	Lost in League Finals
Totals		135	145	.482	—	19	26	.422	

=== Current roster ===
KW Titans roster
Players
Coaches

Pos.	No.	Nat.	Name	Ht.	Wt.	Age
SF	0	(United States)	Maultsby, Marque	6 ft 3 in (1.91 m)	165 lb (75 kg)	27 – 10 August 1999
PG	1	(United States)	Burns, Jordan	6 ft 2 in (1.88 m)	175 lb (79 kg)	29 – 28 August 1997
F	3	(United States)	Lee Jr., Anthony	6 ft 9 in (2.06 m)	240 lb (110 kg)	35 – 24 May 1991
F	5	(United States)	Lightfoot, Jaquan	6 ft 7 in (2.01 m)	235 lb (107 kg)
F	6	(United States)	Akano, Sam	6 ft 6 in (1.98 m)	180 lb (82 kg)	33 – 8 August 1993
G	8	(United States)	Barnes, Dee	6 ft 4 in (1.93 m)	193 lb (88 kg)	26 – 16 May 2000
C	10	(Canada)	Malnerich, Justin	6 ft 2 in (1.88 m)
SG	11	(United States)	Lewis, Victor	6 ft 5 in (1.96 m)	211 lb (96 kg)
PG	15	(Canada)	Kanku, Graddy	6 ft 5 in (1.96 m)
PF	20	(United States)	Smith, Romeo	6 ft 7 in (2.01 m)		31 – 7 October 1995
SF	22	(United States)	Welch, Dominick	6 ft 5 in (1.96 m)	205 lb (93 kg)	28 – 27 August 1998
F	25	(United States)	Jones, Darian	6 ft 9 in (2.06 m)	200 lb (91 kg)	28 – 27 August 1998
SG		(United States)	Fox, Andre	6 ft 3 in (1.91 m)	190 lb (86 kg)	30 – 30 August 1996
G		(United States)	Brennen, Nick	6 ft 5 in (1.96 m)	175 lb (79 kg)

Head coach

- (United States) Cliff Clinkscales

Legend

- (C) Team captain
- (I) Inactive
- Injured

- Roster
Updated: November 23, 2024
