= Trey Kell =

American basketball player (born 1996)

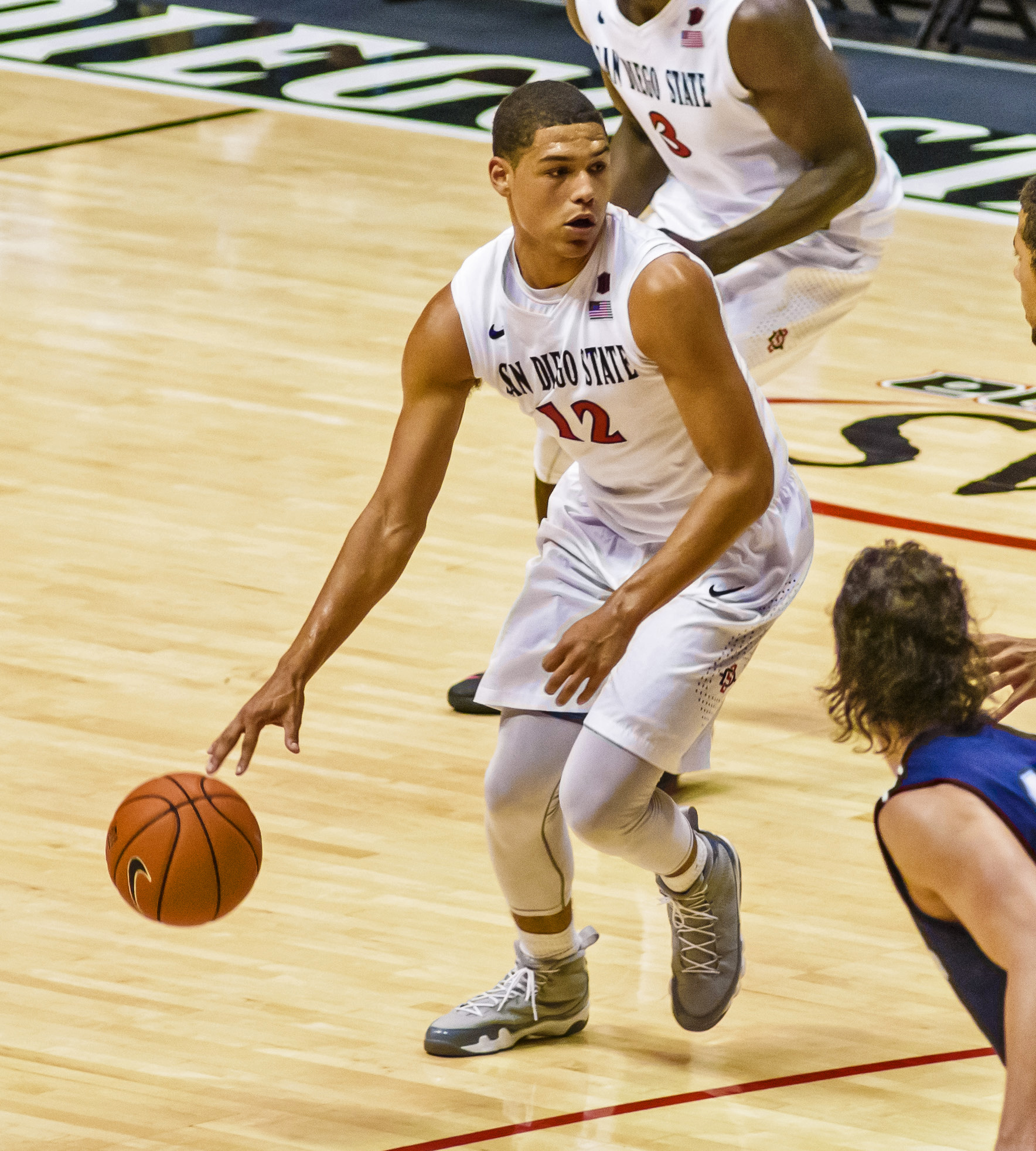
- Kell with the San Diego State Aztecs in 2014

No. 3 – Utsunomiya Brex
- Position: Point guard / shooting guard
- League: B.League

Personal information
- Born: April 5, 1996 (age 30) San Diego, California, U.S.
- Listed height: 193 cm (6 ft 4 in)
- Listed weight: 99 kg (218 lb)

Career information
- High school: St. Augustine (San Diego, California)
- College: San Diego State (2014–2018)
- NBA draft: 2018: undrafted
- Playing career: 2018–present

Career history
- 2018: Igokea
- 2019: Moncton Magic
- 2019: Hong Kong Eastern
- 2021: Stal Ostrów Wielkopolski
- 2021–2022: Pallacanestro Varese
- 2022: Olimpia Milano
- 2022–2023: South East Melbourne Phoenix
- 2023–2024: Adelaide 36ers
- 2024: Bahçeşehir Koleji
- 2024–2025: Illawarra Hawks
- 2025: Shanxi Loongs
- 2025–2026: Toyama Grouses
- 2026–present: Utsunomiya Brex

Career highlights
- NBL champion (2025); All-NBL First Team (2025); Italian League champion (2022); Polish Basketball League champion (2021); NBL Canada champion (2019); NBL Canada Finals MVP (2019); First-team All-Mountain West (2016); Third-team All-Mountain West (2017); Mountain West tournament MVP (2018)

George Earl "Trey" Kell III (born April 5, 1996) is an American-Syrian professional basketball player for the Utsunomiya Brex of the Japanese B.League. He has previously played in Canada, Bosnia, Poland and Hong Kong. He played college basketball for the San Diego State Aztecs.

In international competition, he competes for the Syria national basketball team, since obtaining a Syrian passport in 2020.

== Early life ==
Kell was born in San Diego, California, and attended St. Augustine High School. As a junior, he led St. Augustine to a 29–4 record and a CIF Division III state title. He was ranked the No. 13 shooting guard in his class by Scout.com, and the 79th ranked player overall by ESPN. On October 1, 2013, Kell verbally committed to San Diego State, picking the Aztecs over offers from Vanderbilt, Gonzaga and Oregon.

== College career ==
As a freshman, Kell posted 5.6 points, 2.8 rebounds, and 1.6 assists per game and was named to the Maui Invitational all-tournament team. He helped San Diego State reach the NCAA Tournament as freshmen and beat St. John's in the first round. Kell averaged 12.6 points, 3.7 rebounds and 1.4 assists per game while starting all 38 games as a sophomore. He was named to the First Team All-Mountain West Conference. As a junior, Kell was named to the Third Team All-Mountain West Conference. He was also named (NABC) All-District 17 Second Team for the second straight season. Kell led the Aztecs in points per game (13.2), assists (2.9), steals (1.4) and free-throw percentage (.766) as a junior.

Kell had an injury-shortened senior season, missing time with an ankle injury suffered in a January 27, 2018, loss to UNLV. When he returned, the team went on a nine-game winning streak. Kell scored a career-high 28 points in the 82–75 victory over New Mexico for the Mountain West championship to send the team to the NCAA Tournament. He was named Mountain West tournament MVP. As a senior, he averaged 10.5 points, 4.1 rebounds and 4.1 assists per game.

== Professional career ==
On July 31, 2018, Kell officially started his professional career by signing with the Bosnian team Igokea. He chose Igokea over offers from nine other European teams. Kell was released a month later due to a knee injury and joined the Moncton Magic of NBL Canada midway through the season. He was named MVP of the Finals as the Magic defeated the St. John's Edge in the clinching game behind 41 points, nine rebounds, six assists and three steals from Kell. In September 2019 he signed with the Eastern Long Lions of the ASEAN Basketball League. In three games, Kell averaged 31.3 points, 8.3 rebounds, 5.0 assists, 1.0 steal and 1.0 block per game. He left the team on January 4, 2020.

On January 11, 2021, Kell signed with Stal Ostrów Wielkopolski of the Polish Basketball League (PLK).

On July 14, 2021, Kell signed for Pallacanestro Varese of the Italian Lega Basket Serie A (LBA). He averaged 15.3 points, 4.1 rebounds, 3.1 assists, and 1.2 steals per game.

On January 2, 2022, Kell signed with Olimpia Milano. On June 27, 2022, he parted ways with the Italian club.

On July 14, 2022, Kell signed with the South East Melbourne Phoenix in Australia for the 2022–23 NBL season. He missed the start of the regular season after suffering a broken rib during pre-season.

On July 31, 2023, Kell signed with the Adelaide 36ers for the 2023–24 NBL season. He was shifted from playing as a shooting guard to point guard midway through the season. On December 31, 2023, he recorded a triple-double with 16 points, 10 rebounds and 12 assists in a 91–84 loss to the Illawarra Hawks.

On February 21, 2024, Kell signed with Bahçeşehir Koleji of the Basketbol Süper Ligi (BSL).

On June 28, 2024, Kell signed with the Illawarra Hawks for the 2024–25 NBL season. He was named to the All-NBL First Team after helping the Hawks finish on top of the regular-season ladder. He helped the Hawks reach the grand final series, where he sustained a knee injury in game three and subsequently missed game four.

On March 26, 2025, Kell signed with the Shanxi Loongs of the Chinese Basketball Association (CBA) for the remainder of the 2024–25 season.

On June 27, 2025, Kell signed with the Toyama Grouses of the Japanese B.League. He averaged 22.9 points, 6.5 rebounds, 4.4 assists and 1.6 steals per game. On July 11, 2026, Kell signed with Utsunomiya Brex.

== National team career ==
On October 26, 2020, Kell agreed with the Syrian Basketball Federation to represent the Syria national basketball team in international competitions. He made his debut on November 28, 2020, when he recorded 35 points, 6 rebounds and 6 assists in a game against Qatar in the 2021 FIBA Asia Cup qualification.
