= Braylon Rayson =

American basketball player (born 1994)

No. 2 – BK Ogre
- Position: Point guard
- League: Latvian-Estonian Basketball League

Personal information
- Born: December 25, 1994 (age 31) Dallas, Texas, U.S.
- Listed height: 5 ft 9 in (1.75 m)
- Listed weight: 190 lb (86 kg)

Career information
- High school: West Mesquite (Mesquite, Texas)
- College: Central Michigan (2013–2017)
- NBA draft: 2017: undrafted
- Playing career: 2017–present

Career history
- 2017–2018: Windsor Express
- 2018–2019: Sudbury Five
- 2019: Luoyang Zhonghe
- 2019–2021: Sudbury Five
- 2021–present: BK Ogre

Career highlights
- NBL Canada Player of the Year (2019)

Braylon Rayson (born December 25, 1994) is an American professional basketball player for BK Ogre of the Latvian-Estonian Basketball League. He played college basketball for the Central Michigan Chippewas. In 2019, he was named NBL Canada Player of the Year.

== Early life ==
Rayson attended West Mesquite High School and played AAU ball for the Dallas Trojans. As a senior, he averaged 30.4 points per game. Despite his scoring prowess, his relatively short stature led him to being underrecruited by college teams so he signed with coach Keno Davis and Central Michigan.

== College career ==
As a freshman, Rayson averaged 10.7 points per game as a part-time starter and had a 30-point outing in a triple overtime victory over Ball State. He became a starter as a sophomore and averaged 11 points per game, then raised his scoring to 16 points per game as a junior. As a senior, Rayson averaged 21.2 points per game, combining with Marcus Keene (30 points per game) to be the highest-scoring duo in NCAA Division I, though the Chippewas finished the season 16-16. At Central Michigan, Rayson was twice named Third Team All-MAC. He finished first in program history in three-pointers made with 271 and third in total points scored with 1,888.

== Professional career ==
On September 1, 2017, Rayson signed with the Windsor Express of the National Basketball League of Canada. After coming off the bench in his rookie season, Rayson was added to the roster of the expansion team Sudbury Five and immediately made an impact. On February 27, 2019, Rayson scored a career-high 49 points in a 126–123 victory over the Windsor Express. In the 2018–19 season, Rayson led NBL Canada in scoring with 24.2 points per game in addition to 4.2 rebounds and 4.8 assists per game. Rayson set a new record for made three pointers in a regular season with 149. He was named league player of the year. Rayson signed with Luoyang Zhonghe of the National Basketball League of China on March 20. On October 21, he re-signed with the Five. Rayson averaged 22.4 points, 4.5 rebounds, and 7.1 assists per game. He was named to the First Team All-NBL Canada.

On July 30, 2021, he signed with BK Ogre of the Latvian-Estonian Basketball League.
