= Desmond Lee (basketball) =

American basketball player (born 1990)

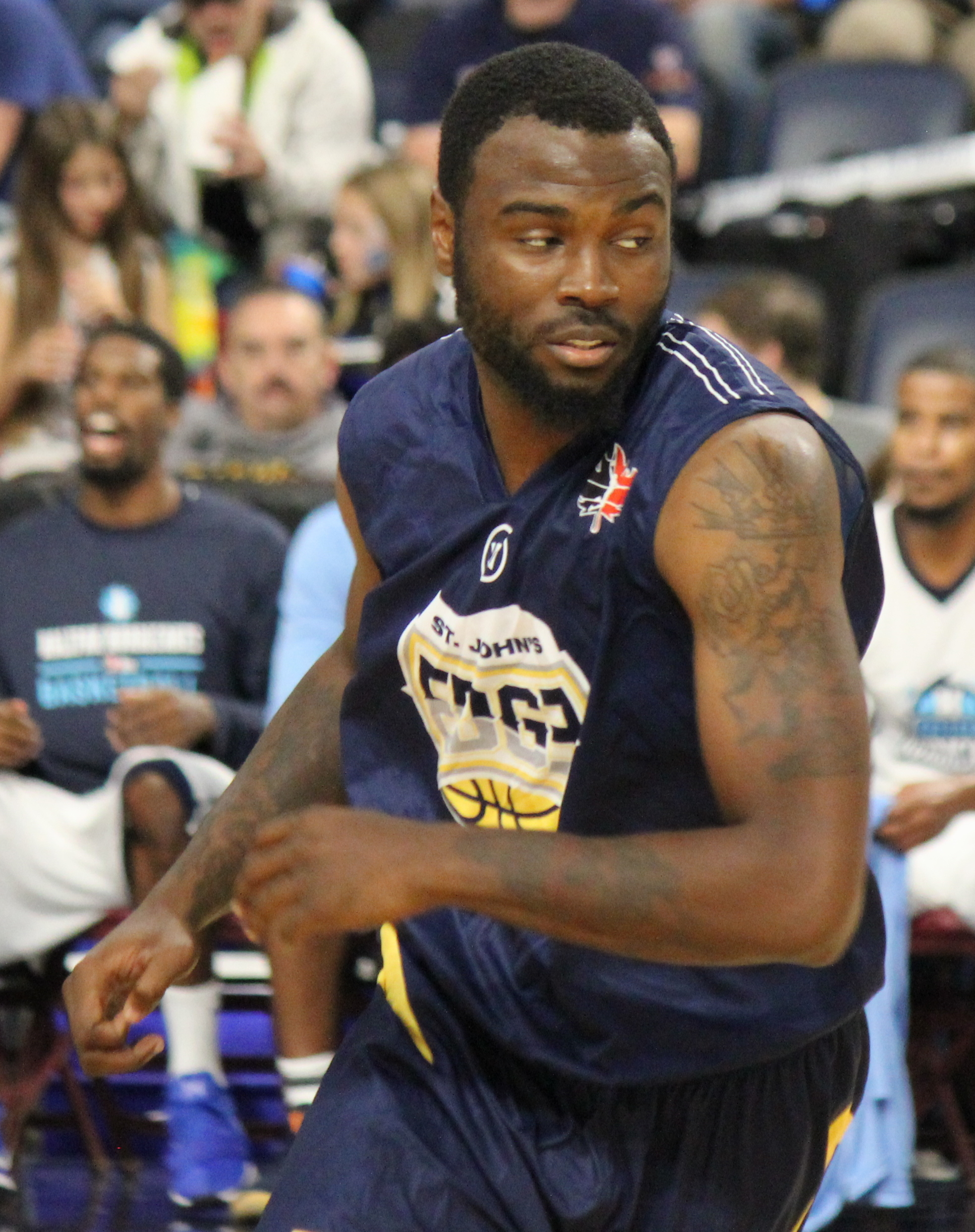
- Lee with the St. John's Edge in 2017

Personal information
- Born: March 3, 1990 (age 36) Norfolk, Virginia, U.S.
- Listed height: 6 ft 4 in (1.93 m)
- Listed weight: 190 lb (86 kg)

Career information
- High school: Booker T. Washington (Norfolk, Virginia)
- College: New Mexico JC (2011–2013); NC State (2013–2015)
- NBA draft: 2015: undrafted
- Playing career: 2015–2020
- Position: Shooting guard

Career history
- 2015: Surrey Scorchers
- 2017–2018: St. John's Edge
- 2018: ABC Santo Domingo
- 2018–2020: St. John's Edge
- 2020: Moncton Magic

Desmond Lee (born March 3, 1990) is an American professional basketball player for the Moncton Magic of the National Basketball League of Canada. He played college basketball for New Mexico Junior College and NC State.

== College career ==
Lee attended New Mexico Junior College for two years and led the team to a 50–16 record. He was a JuCo All-American and was ranked the 10th best junior college prospect when he committed to NC State. As a sophomore, Lee posted 20.3 points, 5.1 rebounds and 2.2 assists per game. In his first Division I game, a 98–77 win over Appalachian State, Lee scored 24 points on 10-of-12 shooting. Lee started 19 games as a junior and averaged 8.4 points per game. However, he saw his playing time drop after the emergence of Trevor Lacey the following season. Lee averaged a mere 2.9 points per game as a senior, but came off the bench to provide defense and energy. He had seven points in the upset of Villanova to send the Wolfpack to the Sweet 16.

== Professional career ==
Lee joined the Surrey Scorchers of the British Basketball League after graduation, signing in July 2015. He departed from the team in October. Lee signed with St. John's Edge of NBL Canada in 2017. He averaged 19 points per game over a four-game stretch in January 2018. Lee scored 24 points in Game 4 of the NBL Canada finals versus the London Lightning. On July 17, 2018, he re-signed with the Edge for the 2018–19 season. On August 3, 2018, he debuted for ABC Santo Domingo of the Liga Ecuatoriana de Baloncesto, scoring 25 points and grabbing 10 rebounds in a 66–63 win over Leones de Riobamba. In the 2018–19 season, Lee played for the Edge and averaged 15.9 points, 7.2 rebounds, and 0.8 steals per game. He was named to the NBLC All-Defensive Team. On January 13, 2020, Lee was acquired in a trade by the Moncton Magic.
