= Moncton Coliseum =

Event venue in Moncton, New Brunswick, Canada

Moncton Coliseum Colisée de Moncton

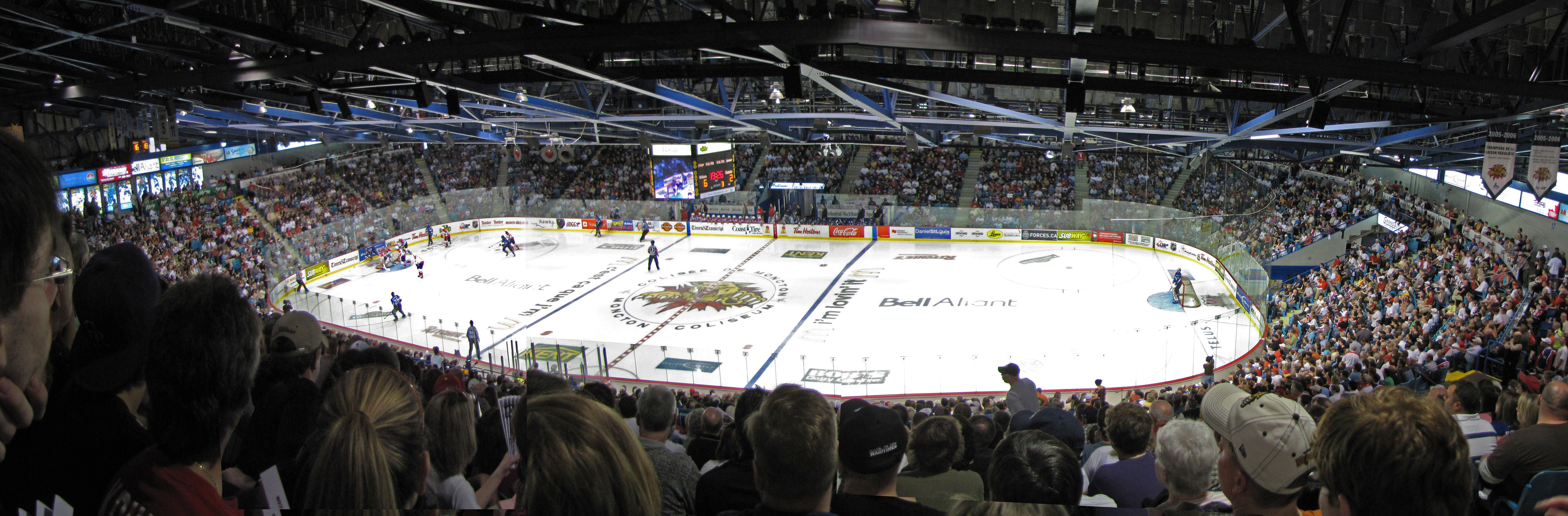
- Moncton Coliseum as seen during a Moncton Wildcats game in 2010
- Interactive map of Moncton Coliseum; Colisée de Moncton
- Address: 377 Killam Drive
- Location: Moncton, New Brunswick, Canada
- Coordinates: 46.096243°N 64.828905°W
- Owner: City of Moncton
- Capacity: 6,554 (seated, hockey); 7,200 (total)
- Surface: 200' X 90'
- Field size: 125,000sq/ft (total exhibition space)

Construction
- Opened: 1973

Tenants
- New Brunswick Hawks (AHL) (1978-1982); Moncton Alpines (AHL) (1982-1984); Moncton Golden Flames (AHL) (1984-1987); Moncton Hawks (AHL) (1987-1994); Moncton Alpines/Wildcats (QMJHL) (1995-2018); Moncton Miracles (NBL Canada) (2011-2017); Moncton Magic (NBL Canada) (2017-2018)

The Moncton Coliseum (French: Colisée de Moncton) is an event venue and former ice hockey arena in Moncton, New Brunswick, Canada. Atlantic Canada's largest trade show facility, the Coliseum has over 125,000 square feet (11,600 m^{2}) of exhibition space and a drawing power of 1.4 million people within a 2½ hour drive.

== History ==
The adjoining Moncton Arena complex constitutes the largest trade show facility in Atlantic Canada.

It was the former home to the QMJHL's Moncton Wildcats and the National Basketball League of Canada's Moncton Magic.

It was also the former home of the AHL's New Brunswick Hawks (Toronto Maple Leafs and Chicago Blackhawks farm team, 1978–82), Alpines (Edmonton Oilers, 1982–84), Moncton Golden Flames (Calgary Flames and Boston Bruins, 1984–87) & Moncton Hawks (Winnipeg Jets, 1987–94).

The arena has hosted several large events, including the 2006 Memorial Cup, the CIS University Cup in 2007 and 2008 and the 2009 Ford World Men's Curling Championship. NHL pre-season hockey games are routinely held at the facility every year. The New York Islanders pre-season hockey camp is at the facility.

The arena has hosted concerts by many famous artists, spanning many different genres.

City Council voted 8–3 to build the new Moncton Events Centre downtown. This arena, now known as the Avenir Centre, was completed in 2018 and the Wildcats and Magic moved in for the 2018–19 season.

The facility is now used for local high school and minor hockey games, trade shows, youth conferences, and much more.

== See also ==
- List of entertainment events in Greater Moncton
- Moncton Sport Facilities
