= 2019–20 NBL Canada season =

- League: National Basketball League of Canada
- Sport: Basketball
- Duration: December 26, 2019 – March 11, 2020 (suspended)
- Number of games: 36 (20–25 games played before suspension)
- Number of teams: 8

NBL Canada seasons
- ← 2018–19 2020–21 (cancelled) →

The 2019–20 NBL Canada season was the ninth season of the National Basketball League of Canada. The regular season was supposed to run from December 26, 2019, to April 23, 2020. However, on March 12, the season was suspended due to the COVID-19 pandemic in Canada.

On April 1, the season was officially cancelled with the league saying they will "begin preparations for its tenth season in 2020–21". The 2020–21 season was also cancelled.

== League changes ==
Because of financial difficulties, two of the league's teams, Saint John Riptide and Cape Breton Highlanders, were granted a one-year sabbatical, with the goal of finding new sponsors in order to rejoin the league next season, reducing the league to eight teams. The decrease in the number of teams also caused a change in the playoff format with the top two teams in each division qualifying for the postseason.

=== Offseason coaching changes ===
- The Halifax Hurricanes hired Ryan Marchand as head coach after the Hurricanes' head coach for the previous three seasons, Mike Leslie, was named team president and general manager.
- The London Lightning hired Doug Plumb, who had most recently been the head coach of the St. John's Edge. Plumb replaced Elliott Etherington who had been promoted during the previous season after the Lightning had fired Keith Vassell.
- The St. John's Edge removed the interim status of head coach Steven Marcus.

== Teams ==
2019-20 National Basketball League of Canada
Division	Team	City	Arena	Capacity
Atlantic	Halifax Hurricanes	Halifax, Nova Scotia	Scotiabank Centre	10,500
Atlantic	Island Storm	Charlottetown, Prince Edward Island	Eastlink Centre	4,000
Atlantic	Moncton Magic	Moncton, New Brunswick	Avenir Centre	8,800
Atlantic	St. John's Edge	St. John's, Newfoundland and Labrador	Mile One Centre	6,750
Central	KW Titans	Kitchener, Ontario	Kitchener Memorial Auditorium	7,312
Central	London Lightning	London, Ontario	Budweiser Gardens	9,000
Central	Sudbury Five	Sudbury, Ontario	Sudbury Community Arena	4,640
Central	Windsor Express	Windsor, Ontario	WFCU Centre	6,500

=== Map of teams ===
Atlantic Division Central Division

== Regular season ==
Standings as of March 11:

Atlantic Division	GP	W	L	PCT	GB	Div
Moncton Magic	23	19	4	.826	—	16–3
St. John's Edge	20	11	9	.550	6.5	6–6
Halifax Hurricanes	24	8	16	.333	11.5	4–10
Island Storm	23	6	17	.261	13	4–11

Central Division	GP	W	L	PCT	GB	Div
London Lightning	24	15	9	.625	—	12–6
Sudbury Five	23	13	10	.565	1.5	9–6
Windsor Express	22	11	11	.500	3	7–9
KW Titans	25	9	16	.360	6.5	4–10

- z – Clinched home court advantage for the entire playoffs
- c – Clinched home court advantage for the division playoffs
- x – Clinched playoff spot

=== Attendance ===
As of games played 11 March 2020

Pos	Team	Total	High	Low	Average	Change
1	London Lightning	42,245	7,914	1,244	3,250	+6.9%
2	St. John's Edge	23,599	5,475	1,781	2,950	−22.2%
3	Sudbury Five	19,094	3,027	1,523	2,387	+16.6%
4	Windsor Express	21,121	4,136	600	1,760	+52.6%
5	Halifax Hurricanes	22,869	4,249	1,123	1,759	−16.0%
6	Moncton Magic	22,344	2,389	1,330	1,719	+49.2%
7	KW Titans	17,452	3,766	938	1,587	+22.0%
8	Island Storm	11,707	1,410	771	976	−20.3%
	League total	178,252	7,914	600	1,981	+6.4%

== Awards ==
=== Player of the Week award ===
For games in week ending	Player of the week		Canadian player of the week	
For games in week ending	Player	Team	Player	Team
December 29, 2019	Damon Lynn	KW Titans	Alex Campbell	Island Storm
January 5, 2020	Xavier Moon	London Lightning	Alex Campbell (2)	Island Storm
January 12, 2020	Karrington Ward	St. John's Edge	Garrett Williamson	London Lightning
January 19, 2020	Chris Jones	Windsor Express	Shaquille Keith	Windsor Express
January 26, 2020	Billy White	Moncton Magic	Junior Cadougan	St. John's Edge
February 2, 2020	Akeem Ellis	KW Titans	Jarryn Skeete	Sudbury Five
February 9, 2020	A.J. Gaines	London Lightning	Alex Campbell (3)	Island Storm
February 16, 2020	Cane Broome	St. John's Edge	Marvell Waithe	Halifax Hurricanes
February 23, 2020	Billy White (2)	Moncton Magic	Kemy Osse	Windsor Express
March 1, 2020	Cameron Forte	London Lightning	Tyrell Green	London Lightning

=== Coach of the Month award ===
Month	Coach	Team
January	Joe Salerno	Moncton Magic
February	Joe Salerno (2)	Moncton Magic
