= American Basketball League (2013–2015) =

Semi-professional men's basketball league

American Basketball League (ABL)
- Sport: Basketball
- Founded: 2012
- First season: 2013
- Folded: 2015
- No. of teams: 4
- Country: USA
- Continent: FIBA Americas (Americas)
- Last champion: Orlando Lightning (2015)
- Most titles: Fort Lauderdale Sharks & Orlando Lightning (1)
- Website: abl-hoops.com

The American Basketball League (ABL) was a semi-professional men's basketball league that began play in January 2013. It is the fourth league to use the ABL name.

Steven A. Hanley, former agent of Magic Johnson, was ABL President and CEO. Former assistant athletic director at Florida Atlantic University Eric Newsome held the position of league commissioner. He played college basketball at Miami University (1983–88), including three seasons with five-time NBA champion Ron Harper. Newsome is fourth leading all-time scorers for the RedHawks.

== History ==
=== 2013 ===
Twelve teams (based in Florida and Texas) in two divisions (Lone Star and Tropics) competed in the inaugural season of 2013. The first season of the ABL began in January with a planned 24-game schedule. The season was never completed due to a number of factors, including allegations of unpaid players and coaches and game day incidents.

=== 2014 ===
The second season featured a slimmed-down league with four south Florida-based teams competing. Two original teams, Fort Lauderdale Sharks and Palm Beach Hurricane, were joined by newcomers Orlando Lightning and Pompano Beach Cobras. After a 14-game regular season, Fort Lauderdale defeated Orlando 90-84 to win the first-ever ABL championship. Both teams finished 8–6 in the regular season, with the Sharks winning four-of-five matchups.

=== 2015 ===
Season 3 again had four teams competing with the expansion Orlando Whalers replacing the Palm Beach Hurricane. Orlando Lightning went 4-0 before defeating the Whalers in the championship game to capture the summer league title.

The league is reportedly in negotiations with The Bahamas Basketball Federation to form a division on the island.

No 2016 season was played.

== Teams ==
Team	City	First season in ABL
Fort Lauderdale Sharks	Fort Lauderdale, Florida	2013
Orlando Lightning	Orlando, Florida	2014
Orlando Whalers	Orlando, Florida	2015
Pompano Beach Piranhas	Pompano Beach, Florida	2013

=== Former teams ===
- Corpus Christi Clutch
- Davie Stars
- Emerald Coast Knights
- Heartland Eagles
- Lone Star Law
- Palm Beach Hurricane
- Panama City Breeze
- Pompano Beach Cobras
- South Texas Revolution
- Sugar Land Legends (joined ABA in Fall of 2014)
- Texas Surge
- Twin City United

== Champions ==
Year	Champion	Runner-up	Result
2013	none	no championship	---
2014	Fort Lauderdale Sharks	Orlando Lightning	90-84
2015	Orlando Lightning	Orlando Whalers	113-63
