= Windsor Express =

Basketball team in Windsor, Canada

- Leagues: Basketball Super League
- Founded: 2012
- History: Windsor Express (2012–present)
- Arena: WFCU Centre
- Capacity: 6,500
- Location: Windsor, Ontario
- Team colours: Maroon, black
- President: Dartis Willis, Sr.
- Head coach: Bill Jones
- Ownership: Dartis Willis, Sr.
- Championships: 2 (2013–14, 2014–15)
- Website: windsorexpress.ca
Home	Away

The Windsor Express are a Canadian professional basketball team based in Windsor, Ontario, Canada, competing in the Basketball Super League. The Express play their home games at the WFCU Centre.

== History ==
On June 28, 2012, the National Basketball League of Canada announced that Windsor had been awarded an expansion team for the 2012–13 season. As the eighth franchise, the league created divisions and placed the Express in the Central Division. On August 1, 2012 the team nickname was officially confirmed. The Express name is partially a tribute to the Underground Railroad and to the rail yards on the banks of the Detroit River.

The team compiled a 22–18 record in its inaugural year, placing second in the Central Division and being seeded 3rd in the playoffs. It lost its only post-season series, a semifinal against the Summerside Storm, three-games-to-two.

On April 17, 2014, the Express won their first championship against the Island Storm (formerly Summerside Storm), 121–106.

The Express were named the 2015 NBL of Canada Champions on April 30, 2015 when the Halifax Rainmen forfeited game 7 after events that transpired earlier in the day. Halifax opted to forfeit the game and leave Windsor, where the game was set to take place, due to an on-court altercation between the two teams earlier in the day.

On May 11, 2023 it was announced that the 3 other teams the Express competed with in the NBLC would be leaving the league to form the Basketball Super League along with The president of The Basketball League, David Magley. While the Express initially held off of joining the BSL in favor of exploring other options, it was announced on August 29, 2023 that Windsor would be joining the league for its inaugural season.

== Home arenas ==
Originally opened in 2008, the WFCU Centre is a sports-entertainment arena in Windsor, Ontario, Canada. The arena has a capacity of 7,000 when setup for basketball. The Express share the arena with the Windsor Spitfires of the Ontario Hockey League. In 2019 The Express proposed a bid to renovate the Windsor Arena to become the new home of the Windsor Express and local recreational activities. In 2021, the proposal was denied by the City.

== Current roster ==
Note: Flags indicate national team eligibility at FIBA-sanctioned events. Players may hold other non-FIBA nationalities not displayed.

Windsor Express roster
Players
Coaches

Pos.	No.	Nat.	Name	Ht.	Wt.	Age
PG	1	(United States)	Tate, Jaylon	6 ft 3 in (1.91 m)	180 lb (82 kg)	31 – 16 January 1995
C	2	(United States)	Muldrow, Sam	6 ft 9 in (2.06 m)	230 lb (100 kg)	38 – 8 June 1988
SG	3	(United States)	Gracey, Khalil	6 ft 5 in (1.96 m)	190 lb (86 kg)	30 – 14 July 1996
SG	4	(United States)	Miles, Jiovanni	6 ft 3 in (1.91 m)	185 lb (84 kg)	25 – 9 January 2001
C	10	(United States)	Barrs, Chase	6 ft 10 in (2.08 m)	230 lb (100 kg)	25 – 8 May 2001
PG	11	(United States)	Burton, Dwight	6 ft 2 in (1.88 m)	180 lb (82 kg)	29 – 23 February 1997
PF	13	(United States)	Gaines, Cameron	6 ft 8 in (2.03 m)	205 lb (93 kg)	27 – 21 June 1999
PF	23	(United States)	White, Billy	6 ft 8 in (2.03 m)	235 lb (107 kg)	37 – 26 January 1989
PG	32	(United States)	Davis, Latin	5 ft 11 in (1.80 m)	190 lb (86 kg)	28 – 15 August 1997
SG	33	(United States)	Polk, Desmond	6 ft 4 in (1.93 m)	180 lb (82 kg)	25 – 6 July 2001
PF	44	(United States)	Elmore, Lydell	6 ft 9 in (2.06 m)	200 lb (91 kg)	28 – 1 May 1998

Head coach

- (United States) Bill Jones

Assistant coach(es)

- Naz Buhagiar
- Yolanda Croxton
- John Elliott

Legend

- (C) Team captain
- (I) Inactive
- Injured

- Roster
- Transactions
Updated: April 1, 2026

== Season-by-season record ==
Season	Coach	Regular season				Post season			
Season	Coach	Won	Lost	Win %	Finish	Won	Lost	Win %	Result
National Basketball League of Canada
2012–13	Bill Jones	22	18	.550	3rd	2	3	.400	Lost First Round
2013–14	Bill Jones	29	11	.718	1st	11	6	.647	Won Championship
2014–15	Bill Jones	21	11	.656	1st	11	7	.611	Won Championship
2015–16	Bill Jones	21	19	.525	2nd	5	4	.556	Lost Division Finals
2016–17	Bill Jones	22	18	.550	2nd	3	4	.429	Lost Division Finals
2017–18	Bill Jones	20	20	.500	3rd	0	3	.000	Lost Division Semifinals
2018–19	Bill Jones	17	23	.425	5th	did not qualify			
2019–20	Bill Jones	11	11	.500	3rd	Season curtailed by the COVID-19 pandemic			
2020–21	Bill Jones	-	-	-	Did not play due to the COVID-19 pandemic				
2022	Bill Jones	8	17	.320	4th	0	3	.000	Lost in Round 1
2023	Bill Jones	12	15	.444	3rd	5	5	.500	Lost in Finals
Basketball Super League
2024	Bill Jones	15	11	.577	5th	did not qualify			
2024-25	Bill Jones	19	9	.679	2nd	5	5	.500	Lost in Finals
2025-26	Bill Jones	13	13	.500	4th	1	3	.250	Lost in First Round
Totals		230	196	.540	—	42	40	.512	10 playoff appearances
