= Moncton Magic =

Basketball team in Moncton, Canada

- Division: Atlantic Division
- League: NBL Canada (2017–2021)
- Founded: 2017
- History: Moncton Magic; 2017–2021
- Arena: Moncton Coliseum (2017–2018); Avenir Centre (2018–2021)
- Location: Moncton, New Brunswick
- Team colours
- Head coach: Nelson Terroba
- Championships: 1 (2018–19)
- Website: monctonmagic.ca

The Moncton Magic were a Canadian professional basketball team based in Moncton, New Brunswick, that joined the National Basketball League of Canada for the 2017–18 season, replacing the league-operated Moncton Miracles in the summer of 2017. The Magic were one of two NBL teams in New Brunswick, the other being the Saint John Riptide (formerly Saint John Mill Rats). The Magic left the NBL in August 2021 and have been inactive since.

== History ==
In 2011, the Moncton Miracles were founded and made their debut in the 2011–12 season of the National Basketball League of Canada. After three seasons of operations under the league management and without an owner, the NBL Canada sold a new franchise to three local business to play as the Moncton Magic in 2017. They hired Joe Salerno from the Island Storm as the franchise's first head coach. In October 2020, Moncton Magic hired a new coach, Nelson Terroba, from the Texas Legends in the NBA G League.

The league did not play a 2020–21 season due to the COVID-19 pandemic, and subsequently withdrew from the league in August 2021.

== Season-by-season record ==
Season	Coach	Regular season				Postseason			
Season	Coach	Won	Lost	Win %	Finish	Won	Lost	Win %	Result
2017–18	Joe Salerno	23	17	.575	2nd	4	6	.400	Lost Div. Finals
2018–19	Joe Salerno	27	13	.675	1st	11	3	.786	Won Championship
2019–20	Joe Salerno	19	4	.826	Season curtailed by the COVID-19 pandemic				
Totals		69	34	.670	—	15	9	.625	1 league championship

== Notable players ==
- Set a club record or won an individual award as a professional player.
- Played at least one official international match for his senior national team at any time.

- (Canada) Jason Calliste
- (Nigeria) Jeremiah Mordi
