= Avenir Centre =

Indoor multi sports arena in Moncton, Canada

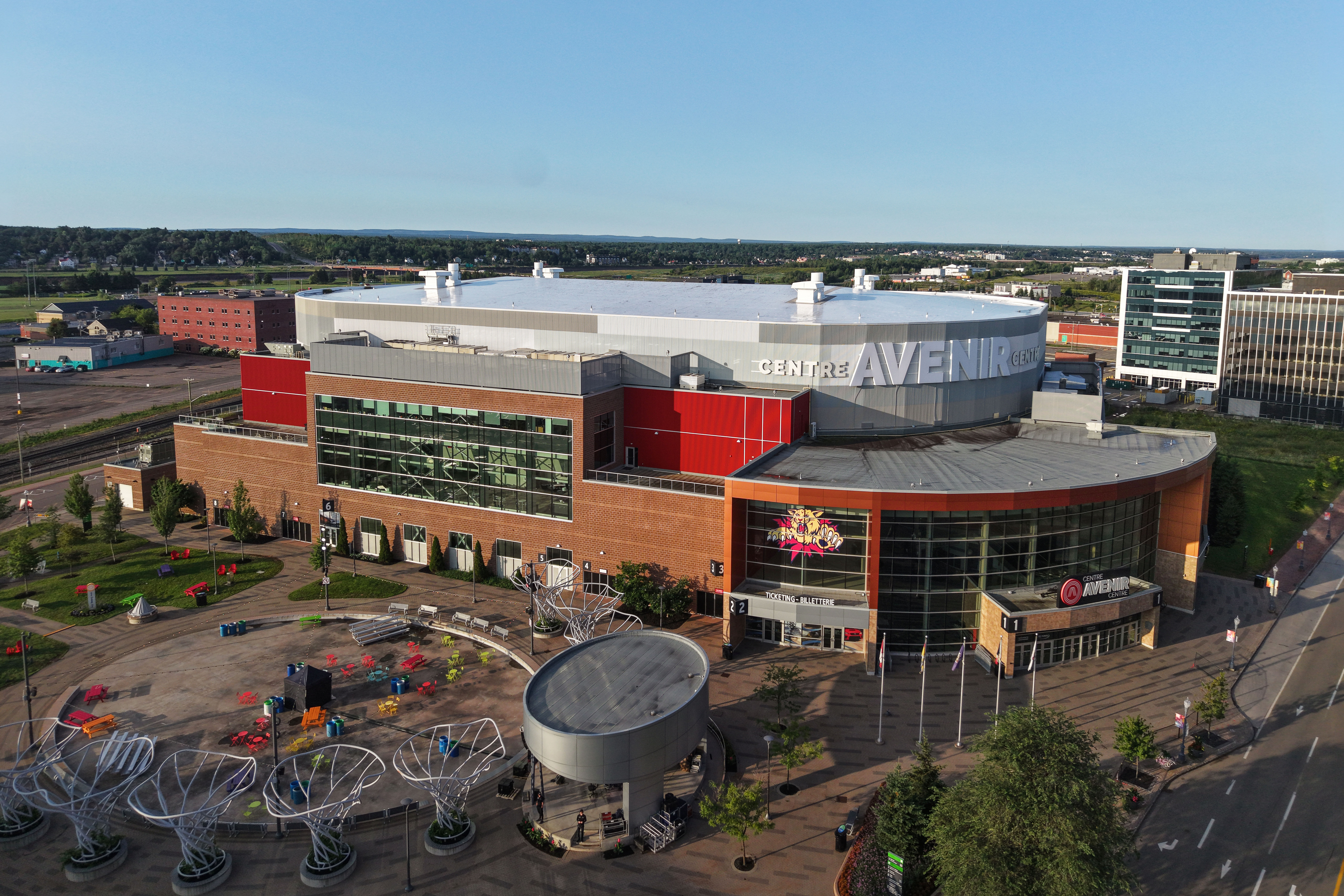

- Location within New Brunswick Location within Canada
- Address: 150 Canada Street
- Location: Moncton, New Brunswick, Canada
- Coordinates: 46.0855005°N 64.7849229°W
- Capacity: 8,800

Construction
- Groundbreaking: 2016
- Built: 2016-2018
- Opened: 8 September 2018
- Cost: $113 Million Canadian dollars
- General contractor: ASM Global

Tenants
- Moncton Wildcats (QMJHL) (2018–present); Moncton Magic (NBL Canada) (2018–2020)

Avenir Centre (French: Centre Avenir) is an indoor arena in Moncton, New Brunswick. It opened on September 8, 2018, it serves as the home to the Moncton Wildcats of the Quebec Maritimes Junior Hockey League.

== History ==
Proposed as a replacement for the Moncton Coliseum, the arena was approved in the spring of 2014 by the Moncton City Council on an 8–3 vote. Groundbreaking took place in the spring of 2016, with a planned opening in the fall of 2017. That date was pushed back a year. SMG would serve as operator of the new arena. Naming rights to the arena were acquired by Avenir Hearing—a New Brunswick-based chain of hearing clinics, naming it Avenir Centre; the company sponsors the distribution of free earplugs at events.

Avenir Centre's first event—a concert by country singer Keith Urban on the Graffiti U World Tour—was held on September 12, 2018. The Moncton Wildcats played their first home game at the arena on September 28, 2018, beating the Saint John Sea Dogs 5–2.

== Notable events ==
Avenir Centre hosted UFC Fight Night: Volkan vs. Smith on October 27, 2018, marking the first UFC mixed martial arts event to be held in New Brunswick.

On November 5, 2019, it hosted Game 2 of the 2019 CHL Canada/Russia Series. The QMJHL team defeated Team Russia 4-3 in OT.

It co-hosted the 2023 World Junior Ice Hockey Championships with Scotiabank Centre in Halifax.

From November 16–19, 2023, Avenir Centre hosted the 2023 Atlantic Slam, a D1 NCAA Basketball Tournament. It was the first NCAA event to ever take place in Atlantic Canada.

On January 24, 2024, it hosted the 2024 CHL/NHL Top Prospects Game, marking the first time the event has been held in New Brunswick.

On June 8, 2024, it hosted the 2024 Quebec Maritimes Junior Hockey League Draft. Moncton last hosted it in 2009 at the Moncton Coliseum.

In May 2025, it hosted games 1, 2 and 5 of the 2025 Gilles-Courteau Trophy Finals, as the Moncton Wildcats faced off against the Rimouski Océanic for the QMJHL Championship.

In 2025, Innovation Arts & Entertainment in Chicago launched "Broadway in Moncton", which featured four Broadway shows, all being played in the Avenir Centre. The shows included Stomp, Chicago, Come from Away, and Mean Girls.

Concerts at the arena include Arkells, Avril Lavigne, Imagine Dragons, Nickelback, Shania Twain, Megadeth, Lil Tjay, Queens Of The Stone Age, The Struts, Jack White, Jann Arden, The Beaches, Bryan Adams, Sting, The Offspring, Sum 41, Our Lady Peace, Metric, Jordan Davis, Sean Paul, Billy Idol, Michael Bublé, Blue Rodeo, Doobie Brothers, Collective Soul, Nelly, and Ja Rule.

Comedy shows include those for Kevin Hart, Theo Von, John Mulaney, Joe Gatto, Russell Peters, and Jim Gaffigan.
