= WFCU Centre =

Arena and entertainment centre in Windsor, Ontario

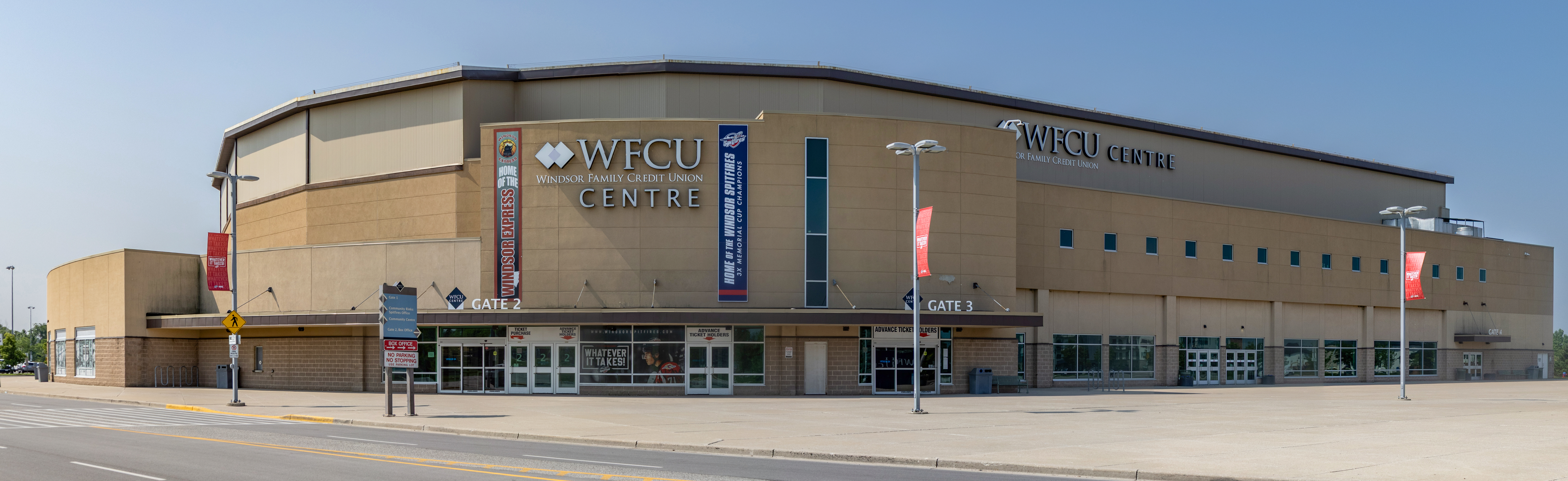
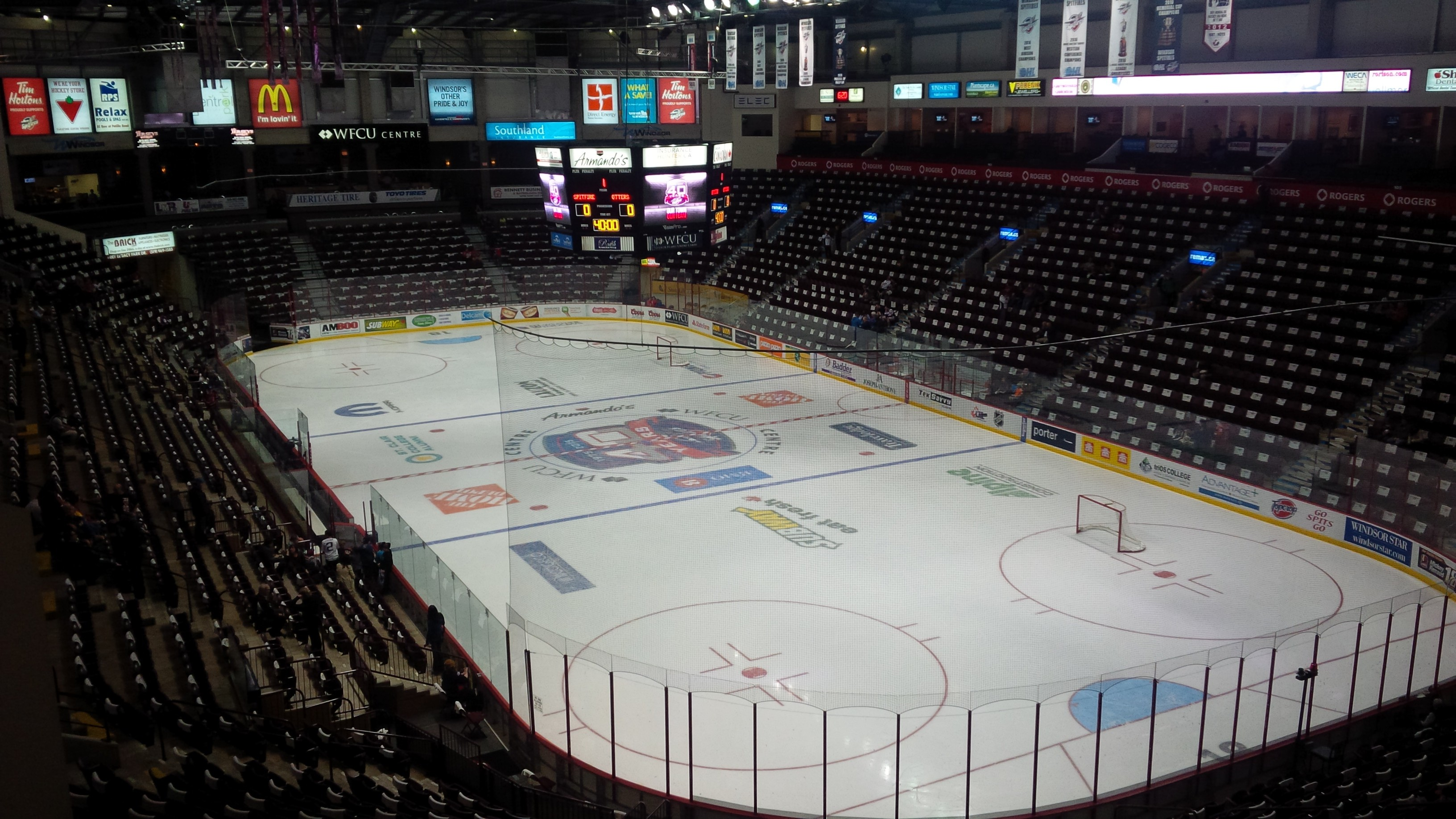
- Exterior in 2025 Interior in 2014

- Location within Ontario Location within Canada
- Full name: Windsor Family Credit Union Centre
- Address: 8787 McHugh Street
- Location: Windsor, Ontario, Canada
- Coordinates: 42.3186°N 82.9279°W
- Owner: City of Windsor
- Operator: Comcast Spectacor
- Capacity: 6,450 ice hockey; 6,500 end stage concert; 4,500 hybrid concert; 3,000 theatre concert; 670 premium club seats; 31 luxury private suites; 2 party/group suites
- Scoreboard: 8 sided, 24 feet in diameter
- Field size: 302,000 sq ft (28,100 m^{2})

Construction
- Groundbreaking: January 22, 2007
- Built: 2007–2008
- Opened: December 11, 2008
- Cost: C$71 million ($102 million in 2025 dollars)
- Architects: BBB Architects, Ltd.
- Structural engineer: HGS Consulting Engineers Ltd.
- Services engineers: Vollmer & Associates
- General contractor: PCR Contractors

Tenants
- Windsor Spitfires (OHL) (2008–Present); Windsor Express (BSL) (2012–Present)

Website
- wfcu-centre.com

WFCU Centre is a multi-sport complex, including arena and entertainment centre in Windsor, Ontario, Canada. The facility includes 3 public rinks, the “Main Bowl”, a swimming pool and a gym. WFCU Centre replaced the 84-year-old Windsor Arena as the primary home of the Windsor Spitfires. It opened on December 11, 2008, in the east end of the city. WFCU Centre is owned by the City of Windsor, operated by Comcast Spectacor, and named for Windsor Family Credit Union.

== History ==
City council approved the project on October 4, 2006, and the groundbreaking ceremony took place on January 22, 2007. The WFCU Centre was built at a cost of approximately $71 million by the Windsor, Ontario-based construction company, PCR Contractors. The land was purchased from London, Ontario developer Farhi Holdings Corporation. The construction of this sports-entertainment centre was decided upon as a part of the city government's overall effort to add excitement to the economy. As part of that effort, Windsor city council committed to building the centre, and agreed to fund most of the cost.

During the initial stages of planning, several other committees and companies proposed building arenas and venues in the area, including a privately owned skating arena, as well as proposed a relocation of the Windsor Raceway Slots to Tecumseh, Ontario, owned by the Ontario Lottery and Gaming Corporation.

In August 2013, Windsor City Council approved a $6.5 million addition to the WFCU Centre, adding a 25-metre pool in advance of the city hosting the 2016 FINA World Swimming Championships (25 m) which were held inside the WFCU Centre. The WFCU Centre complies with the Ontarians with Disabilities Act.

On April 28, 2025, around 10 a.m., a portion of the WFCU Centre roof caught on fire. Canadian federal election polling was being conducted at the facility at the time. No injuries have been reported.

The cause of the fire was unknown until April 29th, 2025, When it was confirmed by rooftop workers for the WFCU Centre, that a solar panel had caught on fire due to faulty wiring.

== Sports ==
The WFCU Centre is home to both the OHL's Windsor Spitfires and the Basketball Super League’s Windsor Express.

The Windsor Spitfires won both the 2009 and 2010 OHL Championship final series on home ice, and the Windsor Express won the 2014 League Championships on home court.

The WFCU Centre has played host to a variety of large-scale events in hockey including the 2012 World U-17 Hockey Challenge, the OHL All Star Game and the CHL/NHL Top Prospects Game. The WFCU Centre also hosted both the Skate Canada Synchronized Skating Championships and the Skate Canada International in 2012, the latter being broadcast internationally. The WFCU Centre also played host to the Grey Power World Cup of Curling in 2010.

The WFCU Centre hosted the 2017 Memorial Cup.
