= Island Storm =

Basketball team in Charlottetown, Canada

- Leagues: NBL Canada
- Founded: 2011
- History: Summerside Storm (2011–2013); Island Storm (2013–2020)
- Arena: Eastlink Centre
- Capacity: 4,000 (basketball configuration)
- Location: Charlottetown, Prince Edward Island
- Team colours: Blue, orange
- Head coach: Tim Kendrick
- Website: www.stormbasketball.ca
Home	Away

The Island Storm is an inactive Canadian professional basketball team based in Charlottetown, Prince Edward Island. The team is a charter member of the National Basketball League of Canada that began play in the 2011–12 season. The Storm plays its home games at the Eastlink Centre. Former Vermont Frost Heaves head coach Joe Salerno served as the team's head coach for the first six seasons until he parted ways with the team in May 2017. In 2021, the Storm were granted a one-year leave of absence after they were the last remaining team based in the Maritimes.

== History ==
The Storm were established in 2011 and made their debut in the inaugural 2011–12 NBL Canada season. It is owned by Prince Edward Island resident Duncan Shaw, who played a major role in founding the league. Initially, it was unclear whether it would be based in the island's cities of Charlottetown or Summerside. However, it was later confirmed that the team would play their home games in Summerside, specifically at the Credit Union Place. NBL Canada president and co-founder Andre Levingston praised the co-owners at the announcement, "We want the right individuals who are going to bring you the very best, because you deserve the very best. That is why we have these two gentlemen here." Comparing Prince Edward Island's low population to the relatively sparsely populated Green Bay, Wisconsin, MacKay said, "We're going to be the Green Bay Packers of basketball."

A name-the-team contest that was sponsored by several newspapers was held to determine the Summerside basketball team's nickname. After receiving more than 400 entries, it was announced that they would be called the "Storm." According to McKay, it was chosen because "it's short, to the point and it has so much opportunity to play on the name and market the team." He also said it worked well through alliteration. The nickname was suggested by 14 people. A contest to determine the Storm's mascot name, sponsored by Basketball PEI and Greco Pizza Restaurant, was held in September 2011.

== Home arenas ==
Originally opened in 1990, the Eastlink Centre is a sports-entertainment arena in Charlottetown, Prince Edward Island, Canada. The arena has a capacity of 4,000 when set up for basketball. The Storm share the arena with the Charlottetown Islanders of the Quebec Major Junior Hockey League.

== Players ==
=== Current roster ===
Note: Flags indicate national team eligibility at FIBA-sanctioned events. Players may hold other non-FIBA nationalities not displayed.

Island Storm roster
Players
Coaches

Pos.	No.	Nat.	Name	Ht.	Wt.	Age
G	10	(Canada)	Campbell, Alex	6 ft 4 in (1.93 m)	200 lb (91 kg)	33 – 21 January 1993
PF	15	(Canada)	Diankulu, Lewis	6 ft 7 in (2.01 m)	215 lb (98 kg)
F	1	(United States)	Edwards, Abrian	6 ft 5 in (1.96 m)	210 lb (95 kg)	30 – 9 April 1995
C	13	(United States)	Haslem, Jailan	6 ft 10 in (2.08 m)	260 lb (120 kg)
SG	20	(Canada)	Landon, Darnell	6 ft 2 in (1.88 m)	184 lb (83 kg)
G	24	(Canada)	Lewis, Marcus	6 ft 4 in (1.93 m)		34 – 16 February 1992
SF	11	(United States)	Lillard, Antwon	6 ft 5 in (1.96 m)	200 lb (91 kg)	30 – 6 November 1995
G	6	(United States)	Loyd, Johnathan	6 ft 5 in (1.96 m)	215 lb (98 kg)	34 – 15 August 1991
G	5	(United States)	Robinson, Robbie	6 ft 5 in (1.96 m)	215 lb (98 kg)	37 – 1 February 1989
PG	3	(United States)	Shamburger, Keith	5 ft 11 in (1.80 m)	170 lb (77 kg)	33 – 28 October 1992
F	7	(United States)	Wright, Nathan	6 ft 7 in (2.01 m)	225 lb (102 kg)

Head coach

- (Canada) Tim Kendrick

Assistant coach(es)

- (Canada) Jeff Morrison
- (Canada) Lonnie States

Team manager

- (Canada) Frankie Beaton

Legend

- (C) Team captain
- Injured

- Roster
- Transactions
Updated: December 27, 2019

== Season-by-season record ==
Season	Coach	Regular season				Postseason			
Season	Coach	Won	Lost	Win %	Finish	Won	Lost	Win %	Result
2011–12	Joe Salerno	12	24	.333	6th	Did not qualify			
2012–13	Joe Salerno	26	14	.650	2nd	4	5	.482	Lost Final
2013–14	Joe Salerno	22	18	.550	2nd	10	7	.588	Lost Final
2014–15	Joe Salerno	19	13	.593	2nd	4	6	.400	Lost Semifinal
2015–16	Joe Salerno	14	26	.370	4th	0	3	.000	Lost Quarterfinal
2016–17	Joe Salerno	16	24	.400	3rd	5	6	.455	Lost Semifinals
2017–18	Tim Kendrick	19	21	.475	4th	1	3	.250	Lost Div. Semifinals
2018–19	Tim Kendrick	12	28	.300	5th	Did not qualify			
2019–20	Tim Kendrick	6	17	.261	Season curtailed by the COVID-19 pandemic				
Totals		146	185	.441	—	24	30	.444	6 Playoff appearances
