= St. John's Edge all-time roster =

National Basketball League of Canada roster

The following is a list of players, both past and current, who appeared at least in one game for the St. John's Edge National Basketball League of Canada (NBLC) franchise.

== B ==
| Player | No. | Nationality | Position | Years with team | School/Club team |
|---|---|---|---|---|---|
| Guillaume Boucard | 9 | Canada | Forward | 2018–present | Carleton |
| Ransford Brempong | 13 | Canada | Power forward | 2018 | Western Carolina |
| Rashaun Broadus | 16 | Albania | Point guard | 2017–2018 | BYU |
| Todd Brown | 21 | United States | Forward | 2018 | Wright State |
| Russell Byrd | 32 | United States | Guard-forward | 2018 | Master's College |

== C ==
| Player | No. | Nationality | Position | Years with team | School/Club team |
|---|---|---|---|---|---|
| Junior Cadougan | 55 | Canada | Guard | 2018–present | Marquette |
| Vasilije Curcic | 21 | Serbia | Power forward | 2017–2018 | Memorial |

== E ==
| Player | No. | Nationality | Position | Years with team | School/Club team |
|---|---|---|---|---|---|
| Wally Ellenson | 33 | United States | Shooting guard | 2017–2018 | Marquette |
| Carl English | 23 | Canada | Shooting guard | 2017–present | Hawaii |

== F ==
| Player | No. | Nationality | Position | Years with team | School/Club team |
|---|---|---|---|---|---|
| Xavier Ford | 35 | United States | Forward | 2018 | Buffalo |

== G ==
| Player | No. | Nationality | Position | Years with team | School/Club team |
|---|---|---|---|---|---|
| Grandy Glaze | 55 | Canada | Forward | 2017–2018 | Grand Canyon |
| Zach Gordon | 44 | United States | Forward | 2017 | Cal Poly |

== H ==
| Player | No. | Nationality | Position | Years with team | School/Club team |
|---|---|---|---|---|---|
| Tyler Haws | 15 | United States | Shooting guard | 2018 | BYU |
| Jarion Henry | 22 | United States | Forward | 2017–2018 | Cal State San Bernardino |
| Charles Hinkle | 24 | United States | Small forward | 2017–2018 | American |

== J ==
| Player | No. | Nationality | Position | Years with team | School/Club team |
|---|---|---|---|---|---|
| Jordan Jensen-Whyte | 6 | Canada | Guard | 2017–2018 | UBC |
| Alex Johnson | 3 | Canada | Guard | 2017–2018 | NC State |
| Rudolphe Joly | 40 | Haiti | Center | 2017 | UQAM |
| Maurice Jones | 12 | United States | Guard | 2018–present | Northwood |

== K ==
| Player | No. | Nationality | Position | Years with team | School/Club team |
|---|---|---|---|---|---|
| Diego Kapelan | 13 | Bosnia and Herzegovina | Guard | 2018–2019 | McNeese State |

== L ==
| Player | No. | Nationality | Position | Years with team | School/Club team |
|---|---|---|---|---|---|
| Desmond Lee | 5 | United States | Guard | 2017–present | NC State |
| Marcus Lewis | 12 | United States | Guard | 2017 | Eastern Kentucky |
| Chadrack Lufile | 7 | Democratic Republic of the Congo | Forward | 2018–present | Wichita State |

== M ==
| Player | No. | Nationality | Position | Years with team | School/Club team |
|---|---|---|---|---|---|
| Maverick Morgan | 22 | United States | Forward | 2018 | Illinois |

== N ==
| Player | No. | Nationality | Position | Years with team | School/Club team |
|---|---|---|---|---|---|
| Jared Nickens | 11 | United States | Forward | 2018–present | Maryland |

== R ==
| Player | No. | Nationality | Position | Years with team | School/Club team |
|---|---|---|---|---|---|
| Colton Ray-St. Cyr | 30 | United States | Guard | 2017–2018 | Coastal Carolina |
| Ryan Reid | 7 | Jamaica | Power forward | 2018 | Florida State |

== S ==
| Player | No. | Nationality | Position | Years with team | School/Club team |
|---|---|---|---|---|---|
| Satnam Singh | 52 | India | Center | 2018–present | IMG Academy |
| Jarryn Skeete | 10 | United States | Guard | 2017–present | Buffalo |
| Anthony Stover | 0 | United States | Center | 2018 | UCLA |

== W ==
| Player | No. | Nationality | Position | Years with team | School/Club team |
|---|---|---|---|---|---|
| Coron Williams | 2 | United States | Point guard | 2018 | Wake Forest |
| Keith Wright | 44 | United States | Forward | 2018–present | Harvard |
