= Adrian Moss =

Adrian Moss may refer to:

- Adrian Moss (basketball, born 1981), American basketball player
- Adrian Moss (basketball, born 1988), American basketball player
