= St. John's basketball =

St. John's basketball may refer to:

- St. John's Edge, Canadian professional team
- St. John's Red Storm men's basketball, American college men's team
- St. John's Red Storm women's basketball, American college women's team
