= Josh Dollard =

American professional basketball player

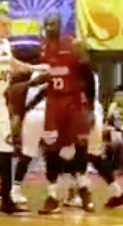

Personal information
- Born: September 2, 1986 (age 40) Hemingway, South Carolina
- Listed height: 6 ft 7 in (2.01 m)
- Listed weight: 235 lb (107 kg)

Career information
- High school: Prince Avenue Prep (Pickens, South Carolina)
- College: Auburn (2005–2008); USC Aiken (2008–2009)
- NBA draft: 2009: undrafted
- Playing career: 2009–present
- Position: Power forward
- Number: 23

Career history
- 2010: Geneve Devils
- 2011: Halifax Rainmen
- 2011: Leones de Santo Domingo
- 2011–2012: Sluneta Ústí nad Labem
- 2012: Darussafaka C.Tires Istanbul
- 2012: Kolossos Rodou B.C.
- 2013: Bucaros de Bucaramanga
- 2013: Bameso
- 2013–2014: UU-Korihait Uusikaupunki
- 2014: Barako Bull Energy Cola
- 2014–2015: Osaka Evessa
- 2015–2016: Changwon LG Sakers
- 2016: Rain or Shine Elasto Painters
- 2016–2017: Sagesse – Al Hekmeh Beirut
- 2017: Shinshu Brave Warriors
- 2017: Al-Ittihad Jeddah (basketball)
- 2017–2018: Bambitious Nara

Career highlights
- Saudi Arabia Premier League champion (2017); Dominican Republic League champion (2011)

Joshua Deshaun Dollard (born September 2, 1986) is an American professional basketball player who last played for Bambitious Nara in Japan.

== The Basketball Tournament ==
In 2017, Dollard played for team Ole Hotty Toddy in The Basketball Tournament. Ole Hotty Toddy was upset in the first round of the tournament by NC Prodigal Sons. The Basketball Tournament is an annual $2 million winner-take-all tournament broadcast on ESPN.
