= Jamar Abrams =

American professional basketball player

Free agent
- Position: Small forward / shooting guard

Personal information
- Born: June 21, 1989 (age 37) Richmond, Virginia, U.S.
- Listed height: 6 ft 7 in (2.01 m)
- Listed weight: 215 lb (98 kg)

Career information
- High school: Highland Springs (Highland Springs, Virginia)
- College: East Carolina (2007–2011)
- NBA draft: 2011: undrafted
- Playing career: 2011–present

Career history
- 2011: Maine Red Claws
- 2012: London Lightning
- 2013–2014: Bambitious Nara
- 2015–2016: Zlatorog Laško
- 2016–2017: SCM CSU Craiova
- 2017–2018: Gießen 46ers
- 2018–2019: Jena
- 2019: Tsmoki-Minsk
- 2020–2021: ESSM Le Portel
- 2021: Poitiers Basket 86
- 2021–2022: ADA Blois Basket 41
- 2022: Iraklis Thessaloniki
- 2022: VEF Rīga
- 2023–2024: CEP Lorient
- 2024–2026: Béliers de Kemper

Career highlights
- NBL Canada champion (2012); All-Alpe Adria Cup Forward of the Year (2016); All-Alpe Adria Cup First Team (2016); Alpe Adria Cup All-Imports Team (2016); All-Slovenian Basketball League Forward of the Year (2016); All Slovenian Basketball League First Team (2016); Slovenian Basketball League All-Imports Team (2016); All-Romania League Honorable Mention (2017); German Bundesliga All-Star Game Slam Dunk Winner (2018)

Jamar Nathaniel Abrams (born June 21, 1989) is an American professional basketball player. He played college basketball at East Carolina from 2007 to 2011.

== Professional career ==
In January 2018, Abrams won the Dunk Contest when he was with the Giessen 46ers. Abrams spent the 2018–19 season with Science City Jena and averaged 12.2 points and 4.6 rebounds per game. On February 4, 2019, he signed in Belarus with Tsmoki-Minsk. On November 26, Abrams left the team after sustaining a severe injury requiring surgery. He signed with ESSM Le Portel on July 9, 2020. Abrams averaged 11.9 points, 3.9 rebounds, and 1.4 assists per game for Poitiers Basket 86. On November 21, 2021, he signed with ADA Blois Basket 41. On February 21, 2022, Abrams signed with Greek club Iraklis for the rest of the season. In 10 games, he averaged 11.7 points, 4.3 rebounds, 1.1 assists and 1.2 steals in 32 minutes per contest.

SEASON AVERAGES
SEASON	TEAM	MIN	FGM-FGA	FG%	3PM-3PA	3P%	FTM-FTA	FT%	REB	AST	BLK	STL	PF	TO	PTS
2010–11	ECU	25.6	3.6–8.0	.451	2.1–5.1	.408	1.0–1.4	.723	4.1	0.9	0.2	0.6	3.0	1.2	10.3
2009–10	ECU	30.6	4.0–8.9	.444	1.8–5.0	.364	1.4–2.0	.677	4.9	0.9	0.7	0.8	2.9	2.2	11.1
2008–09	ECU	27.0	3.6–7.3	.495	1.4–3.4	.426	1.4–1.7	.820	5.0	0.5	0.4	0.8	3.2	1.4	10.0
2007–08	ECU	14.7	1.5–3.3	.440	0.2–0.9	.269	1.0–1.1	.909	2.3	0.3	0.2	0.4	1.8	0.7	4.2

== Personal life ==
Abrams is the son of Chuck and Pam Jackson. He has a younger brother.
