= Community Christian School (Georgia) =

Private, non-denominational Christian school in Stockbridge, Georgia, United States

- Stockbridge, Georgia; United States

Information
- Type: Private, non-denominational Christian school
- Established: 1997

Community Christian School (CCS) is a private, non-denominational Christian school in Stockbridge, Georgia, United States. It includes 6 weeks-12th grades, and also runs a nursery. CCS is a college preparatory school, and operates on the 38 acres (150,000 m^{2}) of land also occupied by Community Bible Church.

== Accreditation ==
Community Christian School is dually accredited through the Southern Association of Colleges and Schools/AdvancED (SACS-CASI), and the Southern Association of Independent Schools (SAIS). CCS is also a member of the Georgia Independent School Association (GISA), the Georgia Association of Private and Parochial Schools (GAPPS), and the Atlanta Christian School Association (ACSA).

== History ==
Community Christian School was founded in 1997 as a ministry of Community Bible Church. CCS began with 32 students in early elementary grades in 1997, and began adding higher grades each year. A new educational building was constructed in 2000 to give the school more classrooms, along with a computer lab, a library/media center and an art room. The school has developed a Fine Arts Department with a full plate of enrichments, complete with band and chorus. A science lab was also added to benefit the middle and high school students.

In June 2003, CCS received its initial accreditation from ACSI (Association of Christian Schools International). They became dually accredited with SACS (Southern Association of Colleges and Schools) in 2005.

In 2008, CCS opened a new 24-classroom nursery/pre-school building.

CCS has a nursery for newborns (6 weeks) through two-year-old toddlers, a preschool (for K-3 and K-4), elementary school (for kindergarten through 5th grade), middle school (for grades 6-8) and high school (for grades 9-12).

CCS runs a summer camp program for ages three-fourteen, and athletic camps for middle and high school students.

== Academics ==
=== Middle and high school ===
CCS offers a number of Advanced Placement and honors courses.

==== Dual enrollment ====
Many Community Christian School students are enrolled in Truett-McConnell College, receiving high school and college credit simultaneously. Students may choose full-time or part-time dual enrollment status.

== Athletics ==
The CCS mascot is the Royal Knight and the school colors are blue, white, and silver. Community Christian School is a member of the Georgia Association of Private and Parochial Schools. The school competes in all major sports, as well as in fine arts and academic competition, through GICAA.

== Notable alumni ==
- Damarion Williams, NFL cornerback
- Carlos Morais, professional basketball player
- Junior Cadougan, professional basketball player
