= Doug Plumb =

Canadian basketball player

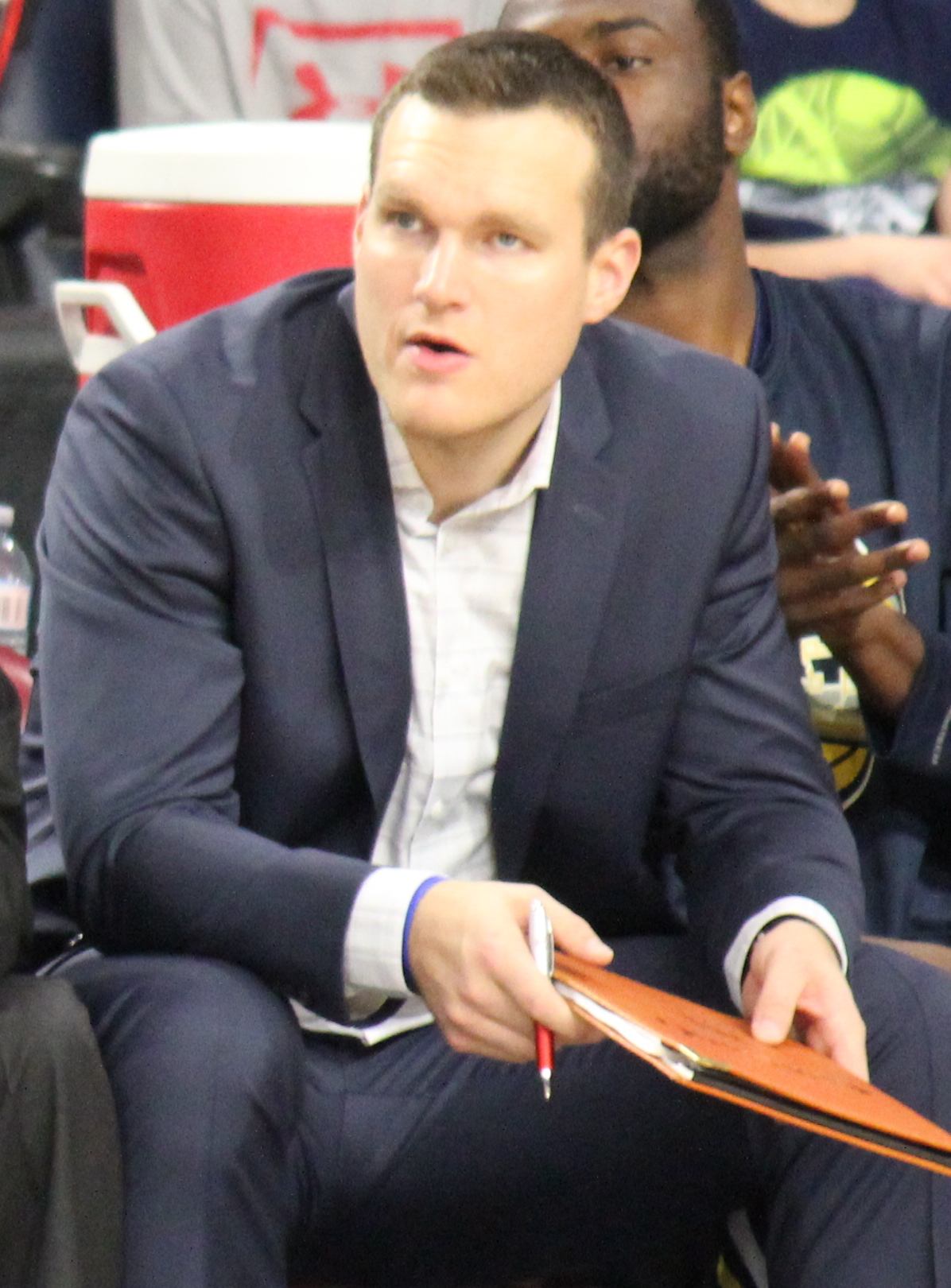
- Plumb in November 2017

Santos del Potosí
- Title: Head coach
- League: LNBP

Personal information
- Born: August 5, 1988 (age 38)
- Listed height: 6 ft 5 in (1.96 m)
- Listed weight: 250 lb (113 kg)

Career information
- High school: Hastings (Hastings, Minnesota)
- College: Minnesota State (2006–2007); UFV (2007–2009); UBC (2010–2013)
- NBA draft: 2013: undrafted
- Playing career: 2013–2015
- Position: Point guard / shooting guard
- Number: 10
- Coaching career: 2016–present

Career history

Playing
- 2013–2014: ZTE
- 2014–2015: CSM Mediaș

Coaching
- 2016–2017: London Lightning (assistant)
- 2017–2018: St. John's Edge (assistant)
- 2018–2019: St. John's Edge
- 2019–2024: London Lightning
- 2025–2026: Tijuana Zonkeys
- 2025–present: Santos del Potosí

Career highlights
- As head coach: NBL Canada champion (2022); NBL Canada coach of the year (2022); NBL Canada champion (2023); NBL Canada coach of the year (2023); As assistant coach: NBL Canada champion (2017); As player: Second-team CIS All-Canadian (2013); First-team Canada West All-Star (2013)

Douglas Anthony Plumb (born August 5, 1988) is a Canadian former professional basketball player. As of 2019, he is the head coach for the London Lightning of the National Basketball League of Canada. He is a 3 time champion of the NBLC and holds the second highest winning percentage in league history winning over 81% of his games. He finished his college basketball career at UBC and briefly played professionally in Europe, before joining the London Lightning as an assistant coach in 2016. He joined the St. John's Edge in 2017 and eventually became the head coach.

== Early life ==
Plumb grew up in Pitt Meadows, British Columbia and attended middle school in Pitt Meadows. As a sophomore in high school, he moved to Hastings, Minnesota after his father Norm found a job there. He played basketball for Hastings High School and left as its all-time leading scorer.

== College career ==
Plumb began his college career with NCAA Division II program Minnesota State on a scholarship. He received little playing time and returned to his family in Canada after one season. In 2007, Plumb transferred to Canadian school UFV, averaging a league-high 17.9 points per game in his first season. In 2008–09, an injury sidelined him from all but 4 games. Plumb spent his last three years of college with UBC, earning second-team Canadian Interuniversity Sport (CIS) All-Canadian and first-team Canada West honors after winning a conference title in 2013.

== Professional career ==
On June 7, 2013, Plumb signed with Hungarian team ZTE. Through 28 games, he averaged 11.4 points, 3.8 rebounds, and 2.4 assists per game. In the 2014–15 season, Plumb played for CSM Mediaș of the Romanian Liga Națională. He averaged 7.9 points, 3.8 rebounds, and 1 assist per game.

== Coaching career ==
After his playing career, Plumb founded Vancouver Basketball, Inc. to train young basketball players. His time there led him to join the London Lightning of the National Basketball League of Canada as an assistant coach and head scout. In the 2016–17 season under head coach Kyle Julius, Plumb and the Lightning won the league title. In 2017–18, he became an assistant coach for the St. John's Edge in the same league. On July 5, 2018, Plumb was promoted to head coach. In March 2019, he resigned from the Edge reportedly to take a job closer to home in British Columbia.
