= Maurice Jones (basketball) =

American basketball player

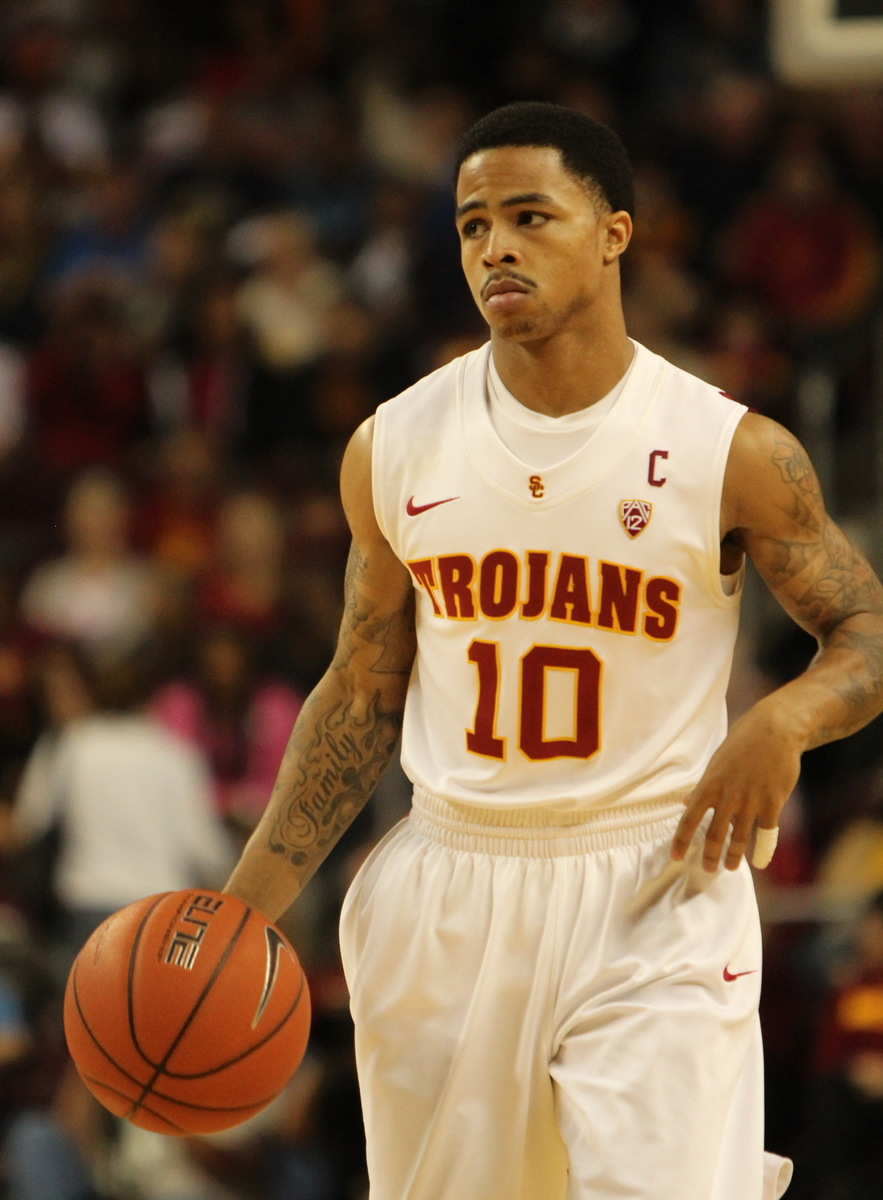
- Jones with USC in 2012

Free agent
- Position: Point guard

Personal information
- Born: December 20, 1991 (age 34)
- Listed height: 5 ft 7 in (1.70 m)
- Listed weight: 155 lb (70 kg)

Career information
- High school: Arthur Hill (Saginaw, Michigan)
- College: USC (2010–2012); Northwood (2014–2016)
- NBA draft: 2016: undrafted
- Playing career: 2016–present

Career history
- 2016–2018: Windsor Express
- 2018–2019: St. John's Edge
- 2019: Island Storm
- 2019: Sudbury Five
- 2019: Saskatchewan Rattlers
- 2019–2020: Moncton Magic

Career highlights
- CEBL Champion (2019); 2× All-NBL Canada Third Team (2017, 2018); NBL Canada All-Defence Team (2018); 2× NBL Canada All-Playoff Team (2017, 2018); NBL Canada steals leader (2018); NBL Canada assists leader (2017); NBL Canada Rookie of the Year (2017); NBL Canada All-Rookie Team (2017); First-team All-GLIAC (2016)

Maurice Jones Sr. (born December 20, 1991) is an American professional basketball player who last played for the Moncton Magic of the National Basketball League of Canada. He played college basketball for USC and Northwood.

== High school career ==
Jones was a star basketball player at Arthur Hill High School. He led the Lumberjacks to the 2010 Class A quarterfinals. Jones averaged 30 points, 12 assists, five rebounds and four steals as a senior.

== College career ==
Jones played two seasons at USC. As a freshman, he was the starting point guard and averaged 9.9 points a game and set the school freshman record for steals in a season with 69. Jones averaged 13 points, 3.5 assists and 1.8 steals per game as a sophomore. In September 2012, Jones was ruled academically ineligible at USC. He decided to transfer to Iowa State, but he was academically ineligible there as well. As a result, he transferred again to NCAA Division II school Northwood. His friend Darvin Ham, who played at Northwood, suggested he give the small Michigan school a chance. Jones was forced to miss two years of basketball. He posted 14.8 points, 6.6 assists and 2.4 steals per game as a junior at Northwood. As a senior, Jones averaged 21 points and 5.7 assists per game. He had a 41-point game against Lake Superior State, setting the school record. Jones was named to the First Team All-GLIAC.

== Professional career ==
Jones signed with the Windsor Express in 2016 and averaged 9.9 points, 3.7 rebounds and 8.0 assists per game as a rookie. He broke league record with 320 assists as well as leading NBL Canada with 83 steals. He was named NBL Canada Rookie of the Year in 2017. In his second season, Jones averaged 18 points and six assists per game, leading the league in total steals with 91. He scored 50 points in his final regular season game against the KW Titans. Jones was named to the Third Team All-NBL Canada as well as the league all-defensive team. In September 2018, Jones's rights were traded by the Windsor Express to the St. John's Edge in exchange for Grandy Glaze. He averaged 22 points, 5 rebounds, 4.5 assists and 2 steals per game with Sudbury.

He signed a contract with the Saskatchewan Rattlers on July 21, 2019. On December 4, 2019, Jones was acquired by the Moncton Magic in a trade for Justin Moss. He was released in February 2020.
