= Niigata City Higashi General Sports Center =

Sports arena in Japan

Coordinates: 37°54′54.6″N 139°6′18.2″E

- Higashi Sogo; Tosupo
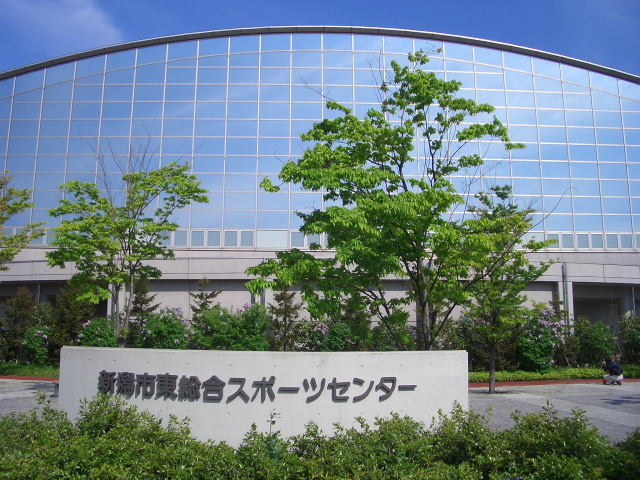
- Interactive map of Niigata City Higashi General Sports Center
- Full name: Niigata City Higashi General Sports Center
- Location: Hanamizuki, Higashi-ku, Niigata, Japan
- Owner: Niigata city
- Operator: Niigata city Development Authority
- Capacity: 3,120

Construction
- Opened: 1998
- Cost

Tenants
- Niigata Albirex BB (2005-2016); Niigata Albirex BB Rabbits

Website
- http://niigata-kaikou.jp/facility/413/

Niigata City Higashi General Sports Center is an arena in Niigata, Niigata, Japan. It is the former home arena of the Niigata Albirex BB of the B.League, Japan's professional basketball league.

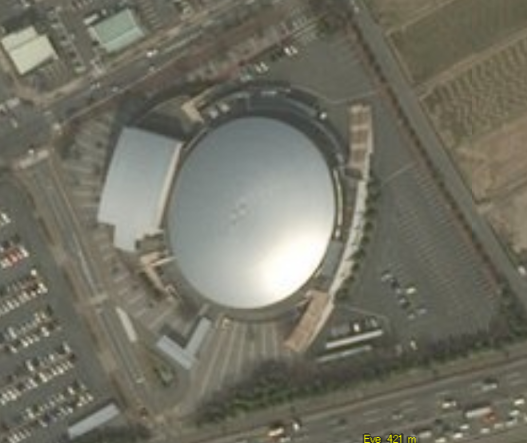
Satellite view

== Facilities ==
- Main arena - 1,826.82sqm
- Sub arena - 816.09sqm
- Training room
- Climbing room
