= Haruyuki Ishibashi =

Japanese basketball player and coach

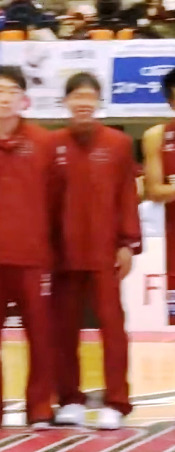

Bambitious Nara
- Position: Head coach
- League: B.League

Personal information
- Born: 3 December 1973 (age 52) Higashiosaka, Osaka
- Listed height: 173 cm (5 ft 8 in)
- Listed weight: 75 kg (165 lb)

Career information
- High school: Hannan University High (Matsubara, Osaka)
- College: Osaka Sangyo University
- Playing career: 1996–2018

Career history

Playing
- 1996-2000: Hitachi Osaka
- 2000-2003: Aisin SeaHorses Mikawa
- 2003-2004: Yokohama Giga Cats
- 2005: Osaka Dinonics
- 2005-2008: Osaka Evessa
- 2008-2010: Shiga Lakestars
- 2011-2012: Kyoto Hannaryz
- 2012-2013: Iwate Big Bulls
- 2013-2016: Osaka Evessa
- 2016-2017: Nishinomiya Storks
- 2017-2018: Bambitious Nara

Coaching
- 2008-2010: Shiga Lakestars (asst)
- 2017-2018: Bambitious Nara (asst)
- 2018-2019: Bambitious Nara
- 2019-2022: Toyama Grouses (asst)
- 2022-present: Bambitious Nara

Career highlights
- 3x bj League Champions; JBL Rookie of the Year (1996)

Haruyuki Ishibashi (石橋晴行, Ishibashi Haruyuki) is a Japanese former basketball player and the current assistant coach of the Toyama Grouses in the Japanese B.League. He played college basketball for Osaka Sangyo University. He was selected by the Osaka Evessa with the 14th overall pick in the 2005 bj League draft.

== Head coaching record ==
Legend
Regular season	G	Games coached	W	Games won	L	Games lost	W–L %	Win–loss %
Playoffs	PG	Playoff games	PW	Playoff wins	PL	Playoff losses	PW–L %	Playoff win–loss %

Team	Year	G	W	L	W–L%	Finish	PG	PW	PL	PW–L%	Result
Bambitious Nara	2018	26	12	14	.462	6th in B2 Western	-	-	-	–	-
Bambitious Nara	2018-19	60	22	38	.367	4th in B2 Western	-	-	-	–	-
