= Jared Nickens =

American basketball player (born 1994)

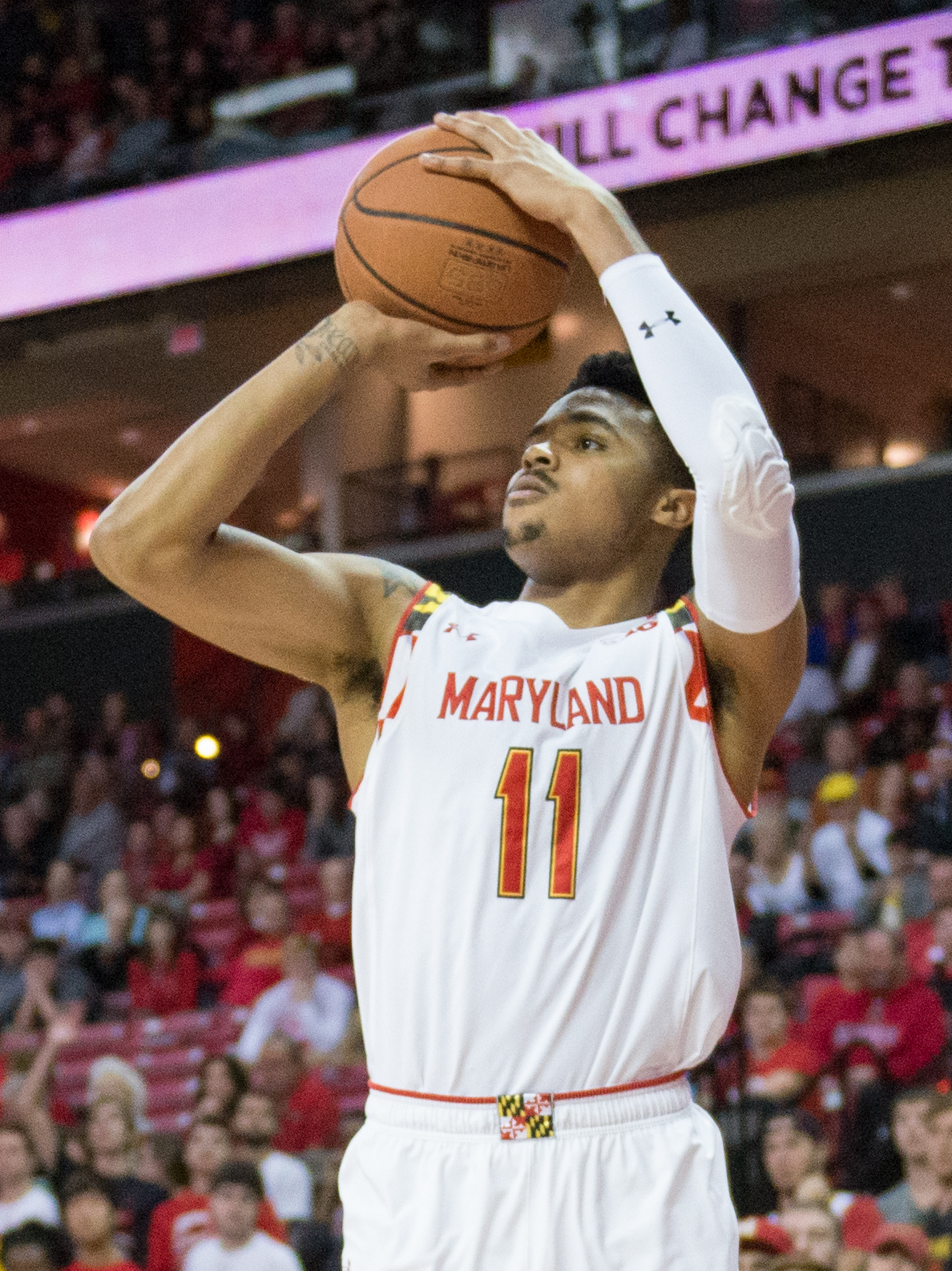
- Nickens with Maryland in 2015

No. 11 – KW Titans
- Position: Point guard / shooting guard
- League: NBL Canada

Personal information
- Born: December 27, 1994 (age 31) Brooklyn, New York, U.S.
- Listed height: 6 ft 7 in (2.01 m)
- Listed weight: 210 lb (95 kg)

Career information
- High school: Westtown School (Westtown Township, Pennsylvania)
- College: Maryland (2014–2018)
- NBA draft: 2018: undrafted
- Playing career: 2018–present

Career history
- 2018–2019: St. John's Edge
- 2019–present: KW Titans

Jared Drew Nickens (born December 27, 1994) is an American professional basketball player for the KW Titans of the National Basketball League of Canada. He played college basketball for Maryland.

== Early life ==
Nickens attended the Westtown School near West Chester, Pennsylvania, where he was coached by Seth Berger. He was considered a four-star recruit by 247Sports.com and was ranked the 94th best prospect in his class. Nickens committed to Maryland on June 16, 2013.

== College career ==
As a freshman, Nickens came off the bench on Maryland's first NCAA tournament team under coach Mark Turgeon. He scored 14 points in the first round match against Valparaiso. He averaged 6.1 points per game as a freshman, shooting 39% from behind the arc. As a sophomore, Nickens scored in double figures seven times, including a 14-point performance against South Dakota State in the NCAA Tournament. After the season, Nickens and teammate Jaylen Brantley popularized the dance craze "Running Man Challenge," which became a viral sensation. The two appeared on The Ellen DeGeneres Show.

He received fewer minutes during his junior season due to the arrival of Kevin Huerter and a poor shooting start to the season. Nickens scored in double figures once, with 12 points in a victory against Michigan. Despite not playing much as a junior, Nickens hit the game-tying three-point shot which resulted in an 84–76 win against Iowa. As a senior, Nickens had an increased role due to the season-ending injury to Justin Jackson. During a five-game stretch during the middle of his senior season, Nickens endured a shooting slump in which he went 6 of 27 and 2 of 19 on three-pointers. In the next five games, he improved his shooting to 17 of 33 and 13 of 26 on three-pointers. During this improved shooting streak, Nickens scored 13 points in a 74–70 loss to Penn State on February 7, 2018. He averaged 5.1 points and 1.4 rebounds per game as a senior and shot 41.3 percent from behind the arc. Nickens did not reach the NCAA Tournament as a senior but finished his career as the eighth-most prolific three-point shooter in school history.

== Professional career ==
Nickens participated in a workout with the Philadelphia 76ers in preparation for the NBA draft. He took part in the training camp for the Rio Grande Valley Vipers of the NBA G League. On October 29, 2018, Nickens signed with the St. John's Edge of NBL Canada. In the 2018–19 season, Nickens averaged 7.4 points, 1.9 rebounds, and 0.4 assists per game. He was named to the NBLC All-Rookie Team. He signed with the KW Titans in 2019.
