= Rohto Arena Nara =

Arena in Nara, Japan

Coordinates: 34°41′42.5″N 135°49′40.9″E

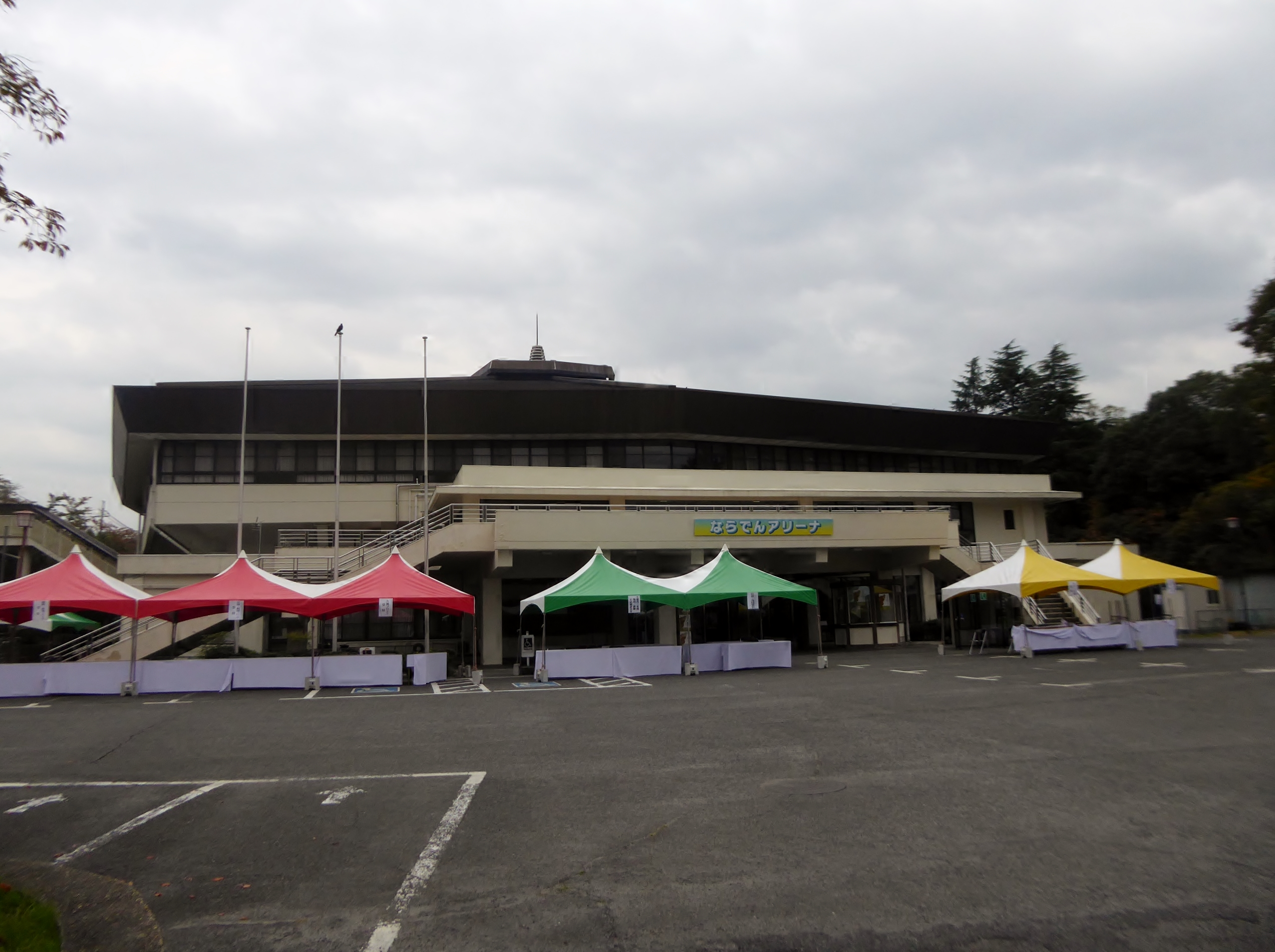
- Interactive map of Rohto Arena Nara
- Full name: Nara City Central Gymnasium
- Former names: Naraden Arena
- Location: Nara, Nara, Japan
- Owner: Nara city
- Operator: Nara city

Construction
- Opened: 1972
- Cost

Tenant
- Bambitious Nara

Website
- http://www.city.nara.lg.jp/www/contents/1147669733093/

Former logo as Naraden Arena

Former logo as Rohto Arena Nara, used until 2024

Naraden Arena is an arena in Nara, Nara, Japan. It is the home arena of the Bambitious Nara of the B.League, Japan's professional basketball league.

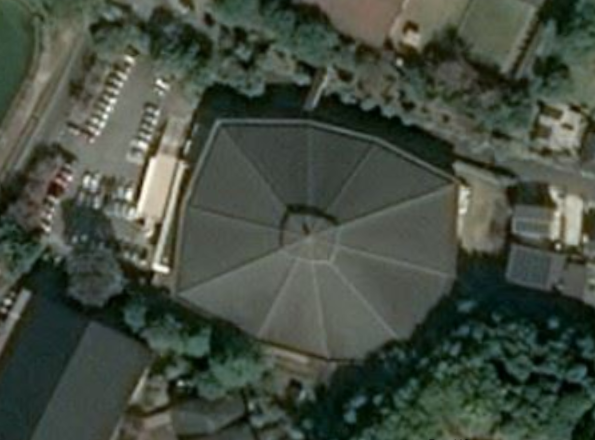
Satellite view
