= Auditorio Miguel Barragán =

Arena in San Luis Potosí, San Luis Potosí, Mexico

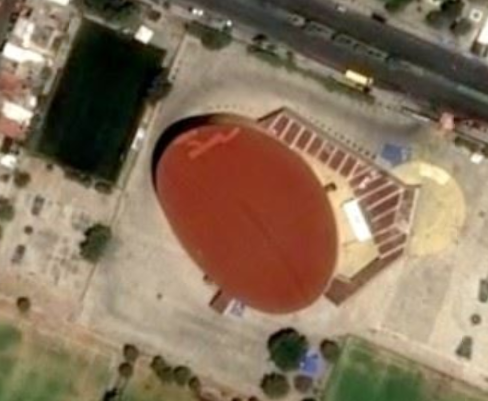

Tenants
- Santos de San Luis

Auditorio Miguel Barragan is a 3,400-seat indoor arena located in San Luis Potosí City, Mexico. Located in the Unidad Deportiva Adolfo Lopez Mateos sports complex, it is used for basketball, concerts, lucha libre, boxing and other events.
