= Niigata Albirex BB Rabbits =

Niigata Albirex BB Rabbits 新潟アルビレックスBBラビッツ
- League: Women's Japan Basketball League
- Founded: 2011
- Arena: Niigata City Higashi General Sports Center
- Location: Niigata, Niigata
- Main sponsor: Denka
- Head coach: Tadaharu Ogawa
- Website: www.albirexbb-rabbits.com
Home	Away

The Niigata Albirex BB Rabbits (Japanese: 新潟アルビレックスBBラビッツ) are a professional basketball club based in Niigata, playing in the Women's Japan Basketball League.

== Notable players ==
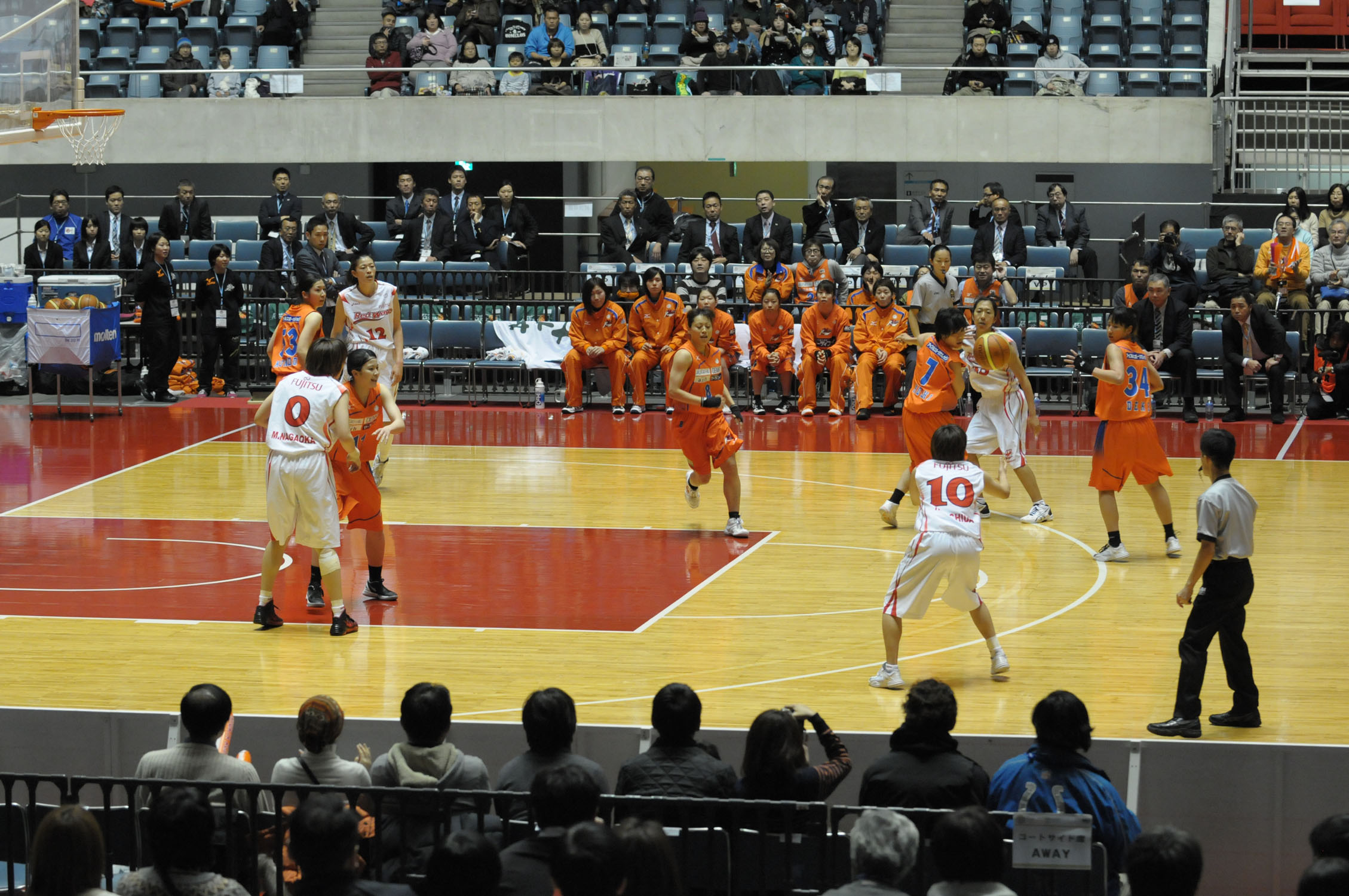

- Reika Takahashi
- Saori Kamihigoshi

== Coaches ==
- Kohei Eto
- Tadaharu Ogawa

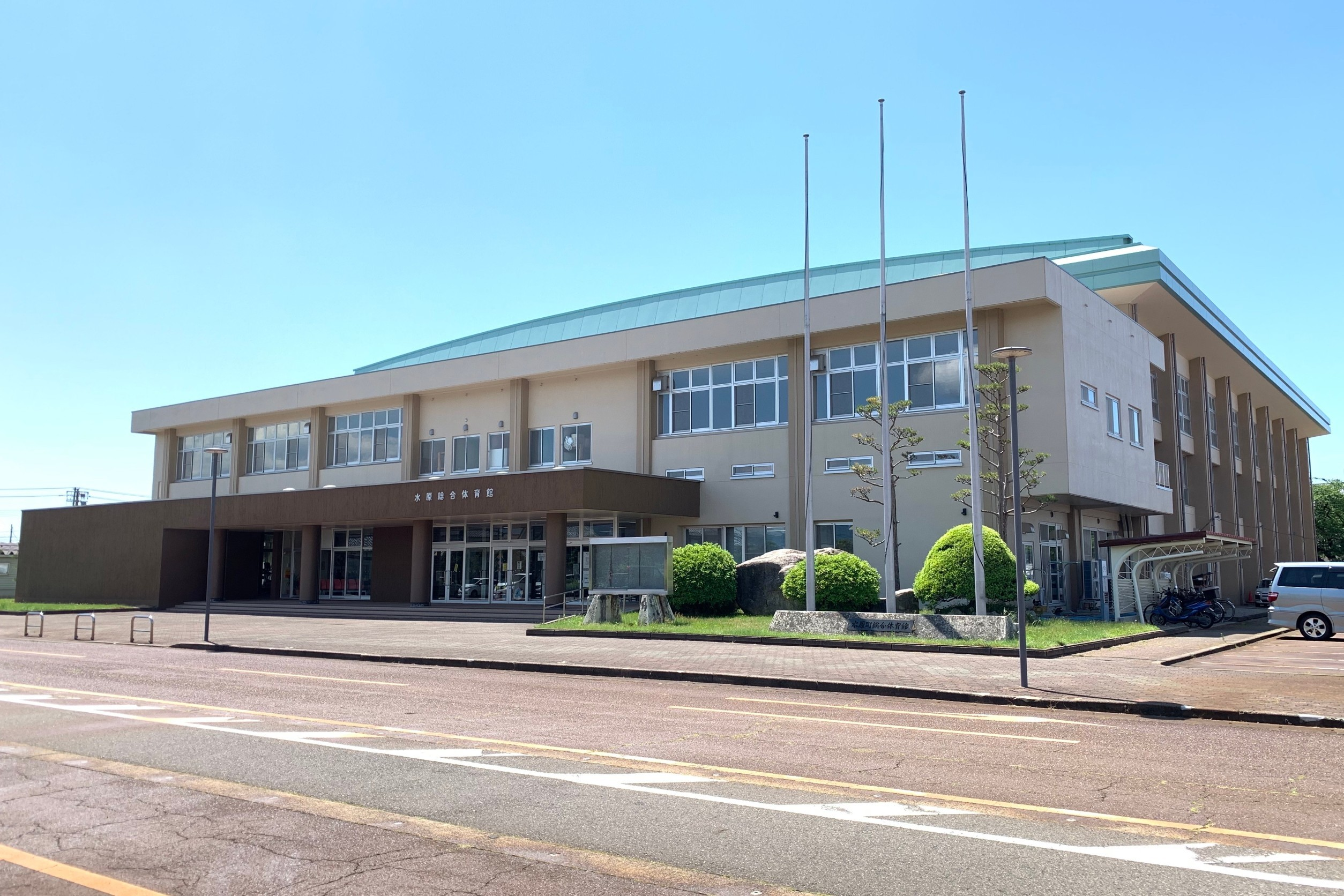
Suibara General Gymnasium (practice facilities)

== Venues ==
- City Hall Plaza Aore Nagaoka
- Toyano General Gymnasium
- Niigata City Gymnasium
- Akihaku General Gymnasium
- Region Plaza Joetsu
- Ojiya City General Gymnasium
- Tochio Gymnasium
- Sakura Arena
- Itoigawa Citizen's Gymnasium
