= Tadaharu Ogawa =

Japanese basketball player and coach

Niigata Albirex BB Rabbits
- Position: Head coach
- League: Women's Japan Basketball League

Personal information
- Born: December 20, 1969 (age 56) Shimonoseki, Yamaguchi
- Listed height: 194 cm (6 ft 4 in)
- Listed weight: 94 kg (207 lb)

Career information
- High school: Shimonoseki Central Tech (Shimonoseki, Yamaguchi)
- College: Senshu University
- Playing career: 1992–2008

Career history

Playing
- 1992-2002: Isuzu Motors Giga Cats
- 2002-2006: Niigata Albirex BB
- 2006-2008: Oita Heat Devils

Coaching
- 2006-2008: Oita Heat Devils (asst)
- 2008-2009: Oita Heat Devils
- 2009-2012: Rizing Fukuoka
- 2013-2016: Ashiya Gakuen HS
- 2016-present: Niigata Albirex BB Rabbits

Career highlights
- 5x JBL Champions
Medals
Men's basketball
Representing Japan
FIBA Asia Champions Cup
Silver medal – second place	1996 Manila	Isuzu Lynx

Tadaharu Ogawa (小川 忠晴, Ogawa Tadaharu) is the head coach of the Niigata Albirex BB Rabbits in the Women's Japan Basketball League.

== Head coaching record ==
Legend
Regular season	G	Games coached	W	Games won	L	Games lost	W–L %	Win–loss %
Playoffs	PG	Playoff games	PW	Playoff wins	PL	Playoff losses	PW–L %	Playoff win–loss %

Team	Year	G	W	L	W–L%	Finish	PG	PW	PL	PW–L%	Result
Oita Heat Devils	2008-09	52	8	44	.154	6th in Western	-	-	-	–	-
Rizing Fukuoka	2009-10	52	30	22	.577	3rd in Western	2	0	2	.000	Lost in 1st round
Rizing Fukuoka	2010-11	50	30	20	.600	3rd in Western	4	2	2	.500	Lost in 2nd round
Rizing Fukuoka	2011-12	30	19	11	.633	Fired	-	-	-	–	-
Niigata Albirex BB Rabbits	2016-17	27	4	23	.148	11th	-	-	-	–	-
