= Bambitious Nara =

- Conference: Western
- Division: Second
- Leagues: B.League
- Founded: 2013
- Arena: Rohto Arena Nara
- Capacity: 3,000
- Location: Nara, Japan
- Main sponsor: Rohto Pharmaceutical
- Head coach: Haruyuki Ishibashi
- Website: bambitious.jp
Home	Away

Bambitious Nara (バンビシャス奈良, Banbishasu Nara) is a Japanese professional basketball team based in Nara. They compete in the B.League One, the second division of the B.League, as a member of the Western Conference. The team's name is a combination of the phrase "be ambitious" and the name of the character Bambi from Felix Salten's 1923 novel.

== Roster ==
Bambitious Nara roster
Players
Coaches

Pos.	No.	Nat.	Name
G/F	0	(United States)	Christian James
SF	3	(Japan)	Soichiro Fujitaka (C)
SG	7	(Japan)	Masaya Komaki
SF	8	(Japan)	Takuya Komoda
PG	9	(Japan)	Shinpei Itabashi
G/F	11	(Japan)	Keitaro Takaoka
PG	13	(Japan)	Naoki Uto (C)
PG	14	(Japan)	Tomoya Yanagawa
PG	18	(Japan)	Naoyuki Fujisawa
PF	19	(United States)	Jeremiah Wilson
C	22	(Senegal)	Cheikh Mbodj
G	29	(Japan)	Kaito Nakazawa
F/C	33	(Japan)	Keiuke Mimori

Head coach

Haruyuki Ishibashi

Assistant coach(es)

Kanjiro Tome

Legend

- (C) Team captain
- Injured

- Roster
Updated: 20 December 2022

== Notable players ==
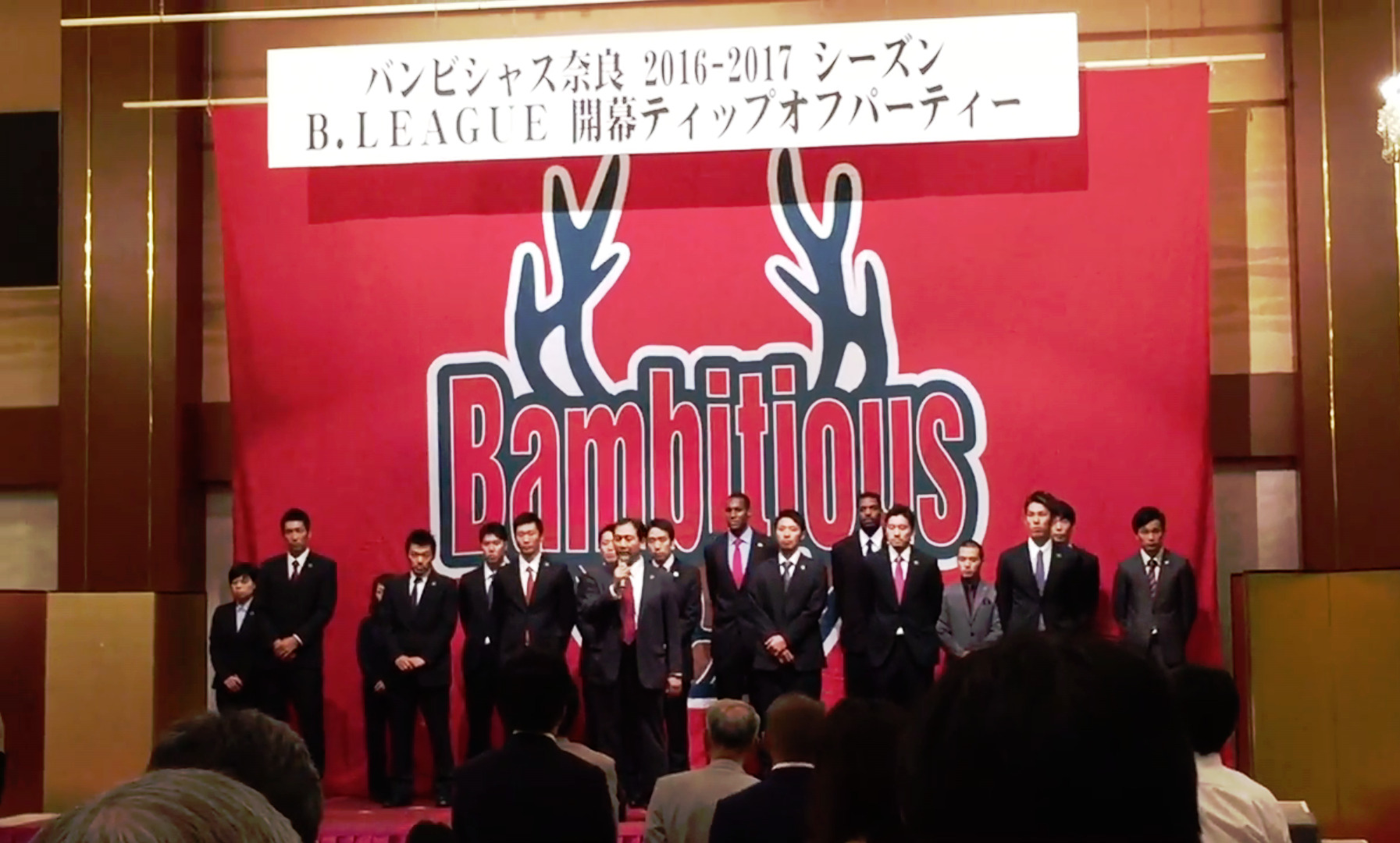
2016-17 Team

- Jamar Abrams
- Ruben Boykin
- Joseph E. Chapman
- Josh Dollard
- Gary Hamilton
- Charles Hinkle
- Adrian Moss
- Tshilidzi Nephawe
- Andy Ogide
- Josh Ritchart
- Tatsuya Suzuki
- Wesley Witherspoon
- Terrance Woodbury

== Coaches ==
- Koto Toyama
- Ryutaro Onodera
- Kohei Eto
- Željko Pavličević
- Haruyuki Ishibashi
- Chris Thomas
- Takeo Mabashi
- Fernando Calero Gil

== Arenas ==
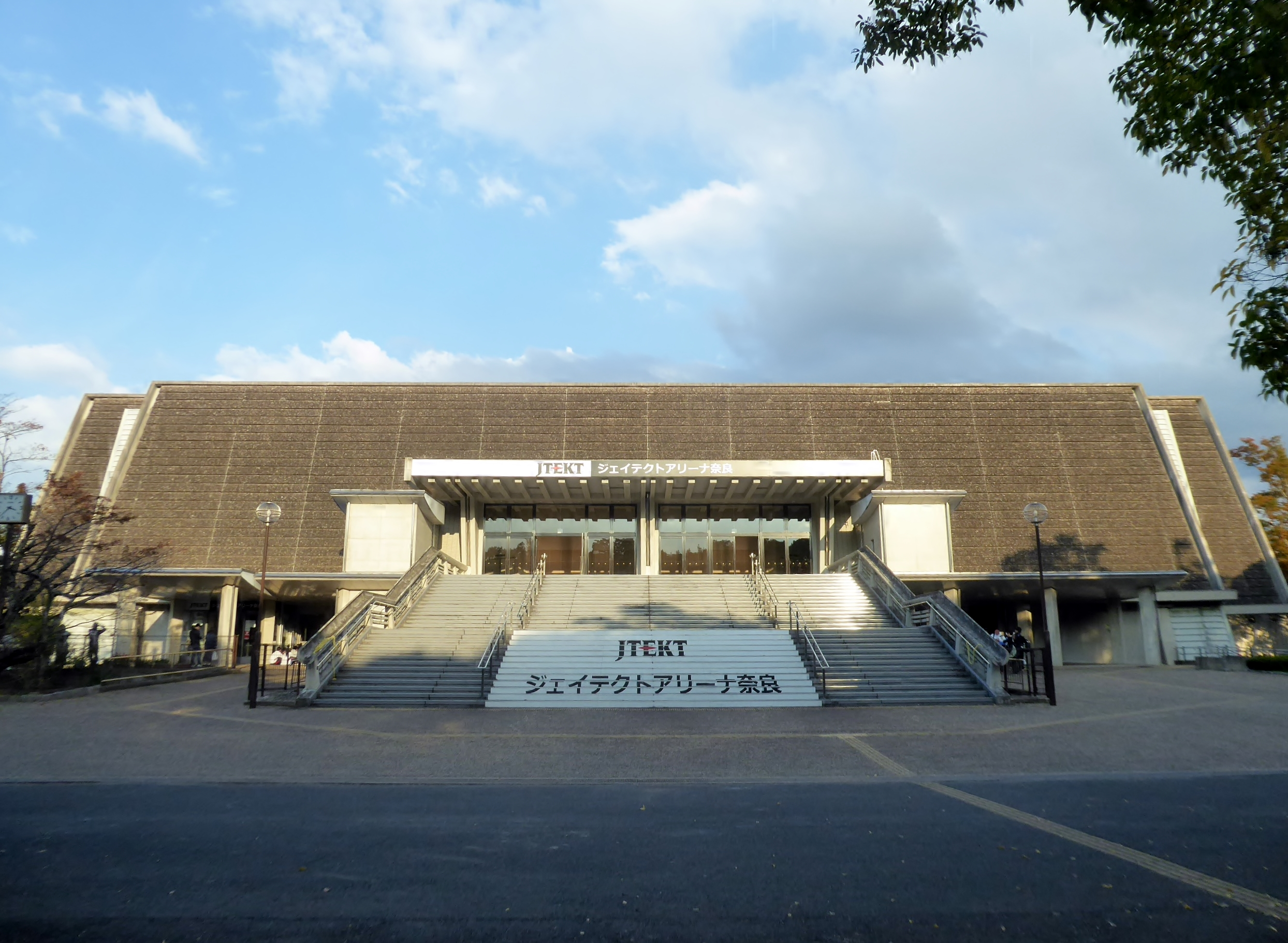
Jtekt Arena

- Naraden Arena
- Jtekt Arena Nara
- Kingyo Square
- Gojo City Ueno Park Gymnasium
- Tenri City General Gymnasium
