= Kohei Eto =

Japanese basketball coach

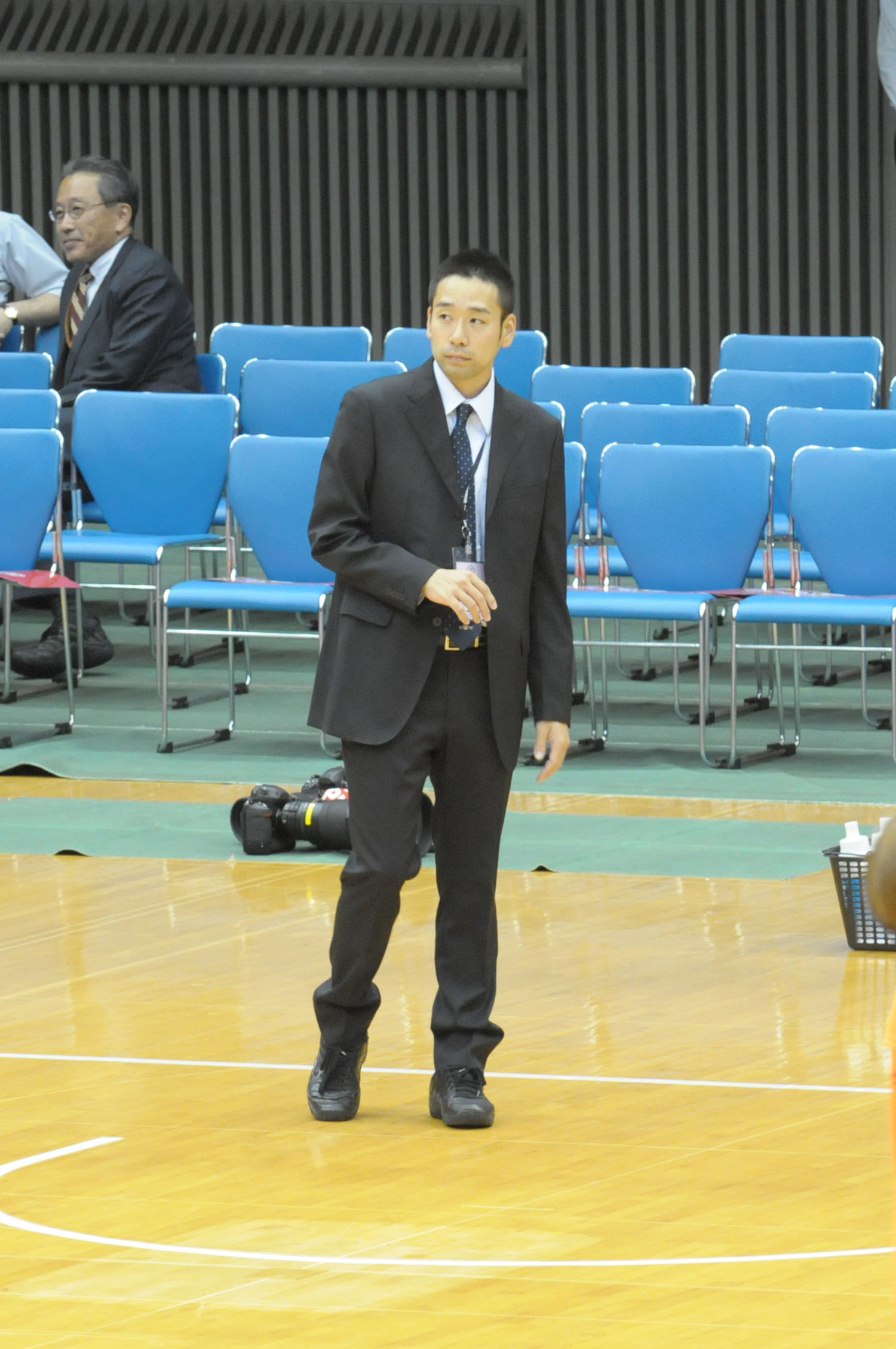

Earthfriends Tokyo Z
- Position: Head coach
- League: B.League

Personal information
- Born: December 27, 1982 (age 43) Suminoe-ku, Osaka

Career information
- High school: Sumiyoshi (Abeno-ku, Osaka)
- College: Kanazawa University

Career history

Coaching
- 2006-2008: Kanazawa University
- 2008: Hamamatsu University (asst)
- 2009: Saint John Mill Rats (asst)
- 2009-2010: Toyama Grouses (asst)
- 2010-2011: Toyama Grouses
- 2011-2013: Niigata Albirex BB Rabbits (asst)
- 2013-2015: Niigata Albirex BB Rabbits
- 2015-2017: Bambitious Nara
- 2017-2019: Kagawa Five Arrows
- 2022-present: Earthfriends Tokyo Z

Kohei Eto (衛藤晃平, Eto Kohei) is the Head coach of the Kagawa Five Arrows in the Japanese B.League.

== Head coaching record ==
Legend
Regular season	G	Games coached	W	Games won	L	Games lost	W–L %	Win–loss %
Playoffs	PG	Playoff games	PW	Playoff wins	PL	Playoff losses	PW–L %	Playoff win–loss %

Team	Year	G	W	L	W–L%	Finish	PG	PW	PL	PW–L%	Result
Toyama Grouses	2010-11	26	8	18	.308	Fired	-	-	-	–	-
Niigata Albirex BB Rabbits	2013-14	33	11	22	.333	8th	-	-	-	–	-
Niigata Albirex BB Rabbits	2014-15	30	5	25	.167	9th	-	-	-	–	-
Bambitious Nara	2015-16	52	17	35	.327	9th in Western	-	-	-	–	-
Bambitious Nara	2016-17	60	24	36	.400	5th in B2 Central	-	-	-	–	-
Kagawa Five Arrows	2017-18	60	22	38	.367	5th in B2 Western	-	-	-	–	-
Kagawa Five Arrows	2018-19	60	19	41	.317	6th in B2 Western	-	-	-	–	-
