= Grandy Glaze =

Canadian basketball player (born 1992)

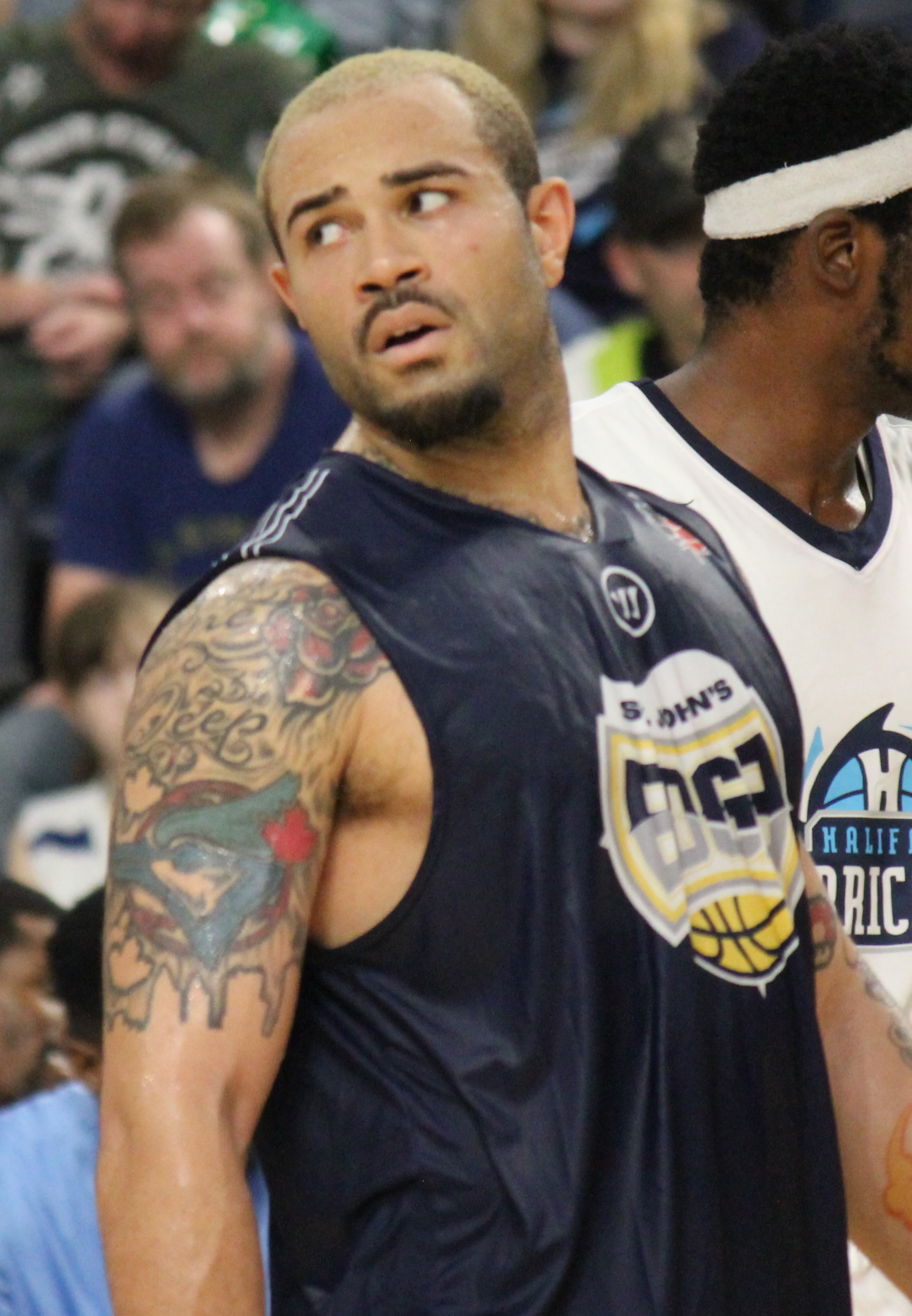
- Glaze in November 2017

Personal information
- Born: March 4, 1992 (age 34) North York, Ontario, Canada
- Listed height: 6 ft 8 in (2.03 m)
- Listed weight: 230 lb (104 kg)

Career information
- High school: St. Edmund Campion (Brampton, Ontario); St. John's Prep (Buckeystown, Maryland); Proctor Academy (Andover, New Hampshire); Notre Dame Prep (Fitchburg, Massachusetts)
- College: Saint Louis (2011–2014); Grand Canyon (2015–2016)
- NBA draft: 2016: undrafted
- Playing career: 2016–2020
- Position: Power forward

Career history
- 2016–2017: Correcaminos
- 2017: Caballeros de Culiacán
- 2017–2018: St. John's Edge
- 2018–2019: Sudbury Five
- 2019: Colegio Los Leones de Quilpué
- 2019: Eltham Wildcats
- 2019: Edmonton Stingers
- 2019: Capitanes de Ciudad de México
- 2019–2020: Al-Ahli
- 2020: Caballeros de Culiacán
- 2020: Niagara River Lions

Career highlights
- Second-team All-WAC (2016)

Grandy Glaze (born March 4, 1992) is a Canadian former professional basketball player. Born in North York, Ontario, he started high school at St. Edmund Campion Secondary School in Brampton before attending three different schools in the United States, including Notre Dame Preparatory School in Fitchburg, Massachusetts. A former University of Nevada-Las Vegas (UNLV) signee, he began playing for Saint Louis at the college level, but after receiving limited playing time, he transferred to Grand Canyon, where he earned all-conference honors.

After leaving college, Glaze was drafted by the Delaware 87ers of the NBA Development League but was released without playing any games. He made his professional debut in the Liga Nacional de Baloncesto Profesional, the top professional league in Mexico, for Correcaminos and also played a season with the Caballeros de Culiacán in the Circuito de Baloncesto de la Costa del Pacífico. In November 2017, Glaze was signed by the St. John's Edge, an expansion team in NBL Canada. He averaged 7.3 points and 6.1 rebounds per game for the Edge, helping the team to the Central Division finals.

== High school career ==
In his freshman basketball season, Glaze attended St. Edmund Campion Secondary School in Brampton, Ontario. For the following two years, he transferred to St. John's Catholic Prep in Buckeystown, Maryland, where he played the power forward position for the Vikings. As a junior at the Mid-Atlantic Invitational at St. Maria Goretti High School in November 2008, Glaze was named tournament most valuable player (MVP) and earned all-tournament honors as his team won the championship. On February 9, 2009, he led all scorers with 31 points to help defeat McDonogh School. By the end of the season, he was averaging 18 points and 8 rebounds per game, en route to The Gazette Player of the Year accolades.

As a junior, Glaze moved to Proctor Academy in Andover, New Hampshire, closing the season with averages of about 20 points and 13 rebounds per game. At the time, Rivals.com ranked him as the 83rd-best prospect in his class and among the top-20 power forwards. Glaze played his final season at the high school level for Notre Dame Preparatory School in Fitchburg, Massachusetts. On November 11, 2010, he signed a letter of intent to play for the UNLV Runnin' Rebels in college, turning down offers from Akron, South Florida, and West Virginia. However, in April 2011, after the Rebels lost head coach Lon Kruger, Glaze requested release from his UNLV commitment. On August 2, 2011, he signed with the Saint Louis Billikens to play under coach Rick Majerus.

== College career ==
For the 2011–2012 season, Glaze played in a mere 9 games as reserve power forward for the Billikens. Against Alabama State, he played 10 minutes while recording 2 points, 3 rebounds, and an assist. Glaze dislocated his shoulder in November 2012 after diving for a loose ball against Texas A&M and missed the next five games. Glaze played in 25 games, a sizable increase in playing time, and had 20 starts. Glaze's best game came against conference foe Duquesne where he tallied 8 points, 10 rebounds, and 2 steals. The 2012–13 Saint Louis Billikens men's basketball team went 28–7 and earned the Billikens a 4 seed in the NCAA Tournament, where they eventually lost in the 3rd Round to 12th seeded Oregon. He averaged 3.1 points and 2.6 rebounds per game as a sophomore.

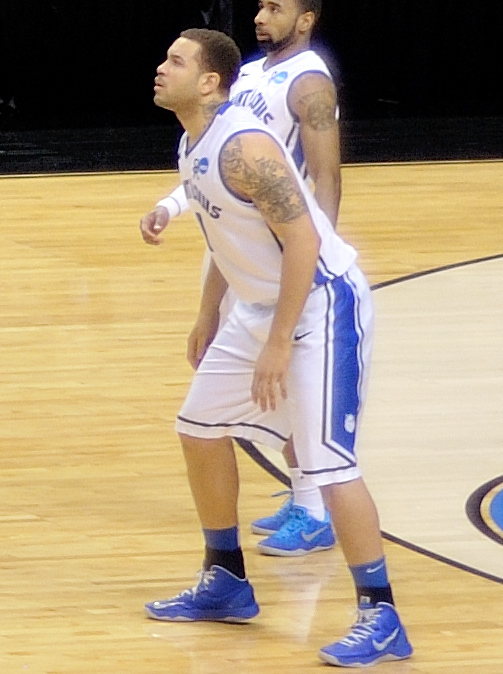
Glaze (front) with Saint Louis at the 2013 NCAA tournament

Glaze played in all 34 games as a junior while making 6 starts for the Billikens. In the team's opener, Glaze scored 16 points on 7 of 7 shooting and grabbed 10 rebounds while the Billikens defeated Southeast Missouri State 87–64. Glaze followed up this career game with another notable performance against Southern Illinois Edwardsville where he scored 9 points, tallied 14 rebounds, and dished out an assist. After these two career games, Glaze continued to play well and had another strong performance with 14 points in a 67–65 win over Valparaiso on December 7. Glaze logged few minutes during conference play. The Billikens, however, went on a winning streak which eventually placed them in the AP Poll as high as #10. St. Louis ended up being a 5 seed in the NCAA Tournament, where the Billikens won in one of the greatest comebacks in NCAA Tournament history against North Carolina State, rallying from 14 down to win in OT. He averaged 3.8 points and 4.5 rebounds as a junior in 12.9 minutes per game. Even though his numbers weren't impressive, Glaze specialized in activities that did not show up on box scores such as setting screens, boxing out on rebounds, and playing strong defense.

Glaze came into the 2014–15 season expecting to be in the starting lineup and play major minutes for the Billikens due to graduating players. However, before the season started Glaze re-injured his shoulder in practice and was officially ruled out for a few weeks. He ended up having to sit out the entire season due to surgery on that shoulder. On May 11, Glaze officially transferred to Grand Canyon University. He chose the Antelopes over offers from Wyoming and New Mexico and did not need to sit out a year, as he was a graduate transfer. Glaze scored a career-high 29 points in a 108–104 loss to Omaha on December 13, 2015. In his only season at Grand Canyon, he finished eighth in the Western Athletic Conference in scoring with 14.0 points per game, second in rebounding with 8.8 per game, and first in field goal percentage with 59.6 percent. Glaze led the team to a 27–7 record and earned the 2016 Riley Wallace Award for best college basketball transfer. He was also named second team National Association of Basketball Coaches All-Region 6 and second team All-WAC. Glaze received the Most Valuable Player award in the first John McLendon Classic during the first-round CollegeInsider.com Tournament game.

== Professional career ==
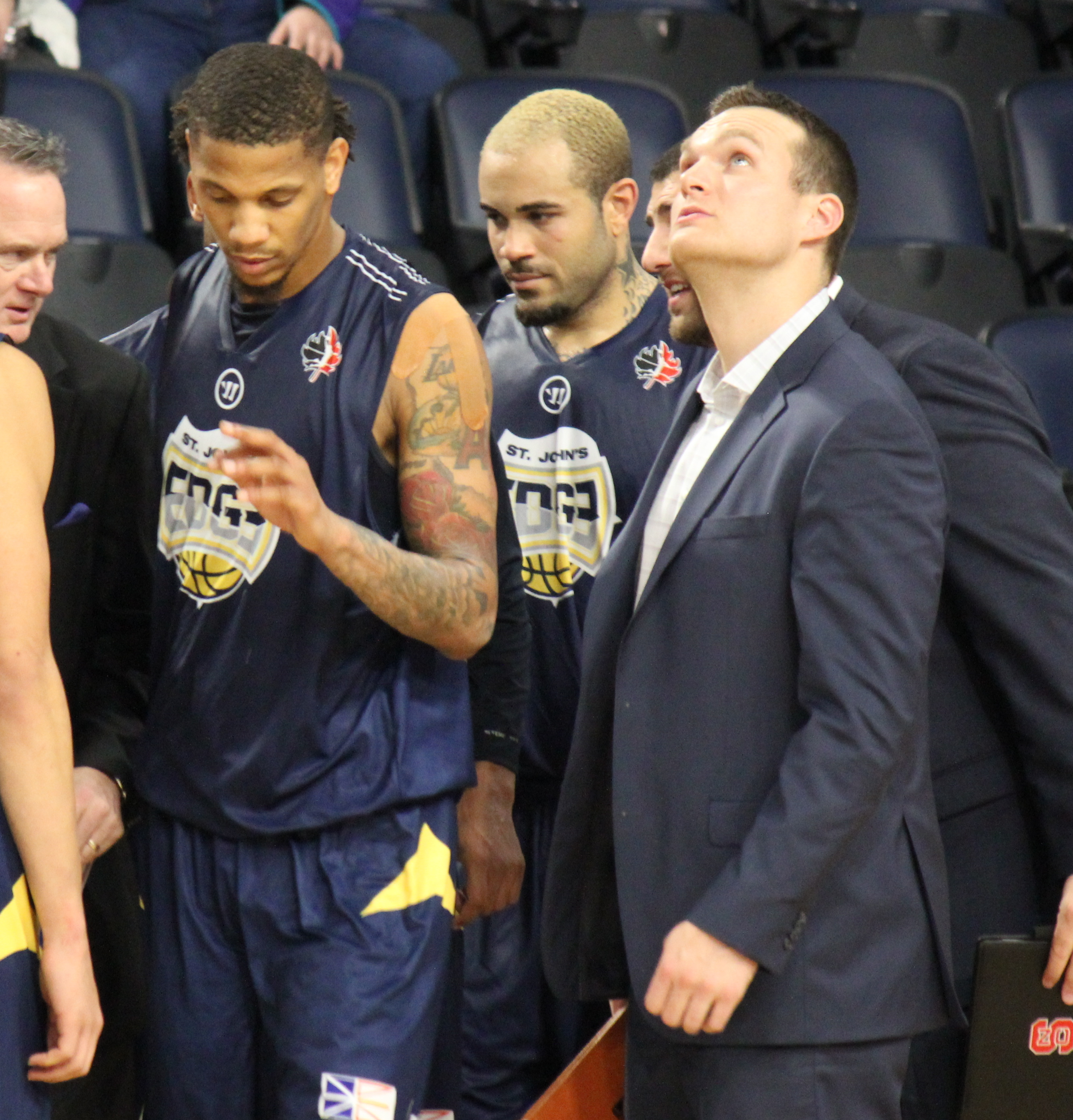
Glaze (third from right) during a timeout with the St. John's Edge

After graduation, Glaze worked out with the Philadelphia 76ers in anticipation for the 2016 NBA draft. He was drafted by their D-League affiliate the Delaware 87ers with the seventh pick of the third round in the 2016 NBA Development League Draft. He was one of four WAC players taken in the D-League draft. However, he never played for the 87ers and instead debuted for Correcaminos of the Liga Nacional de Baloncesto Profesional in Mexico. Glaze averaged 16 points, 12.3 rebounds and 2.1 assists per game. He led the league in rebounding but Correcaminos, which is owned by the Autonomous University of Tamaulipas, finished last in league standings. In March 2017 Glaze signed with the Caballeros de Culiacán of the Circuito de Baloncesto de la Costa del Pacífico, another league in Mexico.

In November 2017, Glaze was signed by the St. John's Edge, an expansion team in NBL Canada. He was dominant in the early season, contributing 19 points and 20 rebounds against the Island Storm, and posting 18 points and 17 rebounds the following game versus the Halifax Hurricanes. Glaze missed four games in November due to representing Canada in qualification matches for the FIBA Basketball World Cup. In a game versus the London Lightning on March 3, 2018, Glaze left the bench during a melee in which Carl English was tripped up. Glaze was ejected and was suspended the following game by the league. In their first season in play, the Edge reached the Central Division finals, losing to the London Lightning. He averaged 7.3 points and 6.1 rebounds per game for the Edge, shooting 60 percent on field goals. Glaze was named to the Third Team All-Canadian.

In September 2018, Glaze's rights were traded by the St. John's Edge to the Windsor Express in exchange for Maurice Jones. Days later, his rights were traded to the Sudbury Five for those of Juan Pattillo. On October 12, 2018, Glaze signed with the Five. He averaged 13.9 points and 11.6 rebounds per game in 16 games.

In January 2019, Glaze signed with Colegio Los Leones de Quilpué of the Liga Nacional de Básquetbol de Chile. Glaze briefly joined the Eltham Wildcats of the upstart Australian NBL1 but was released in April 2019. He joined the Edmonton Stingers for the inaugural season of the Canadian Elite Basketball League. On July 11, 2019, Glaze had 28 points and 15 rebounds in a 110–91 win over the Guelph Nighthawks. In 19 games he averaged 10.8 points, 7.6 rebounds, and 2.4 assists per game. Glaze briefly played for the Capitanes de Ciudad de México of the Liga Nacional de Baloncesto Profesional, where in two games he averaged 29 points, eight rebounds, two steals, and 1.5 assists per game. In November 2019, Glaze signed with Al Ahli in Jordan.

In the summer of 2020, Glaze rejoined the Caballeros de Culiacán and had nine points, five rebounds, and four assists in his only game. On July 2, 2020, he signed with the Niagara River Lions of the Canadian Elite Basketball League.
