= Junior Cadougan =

Canadian basketball player

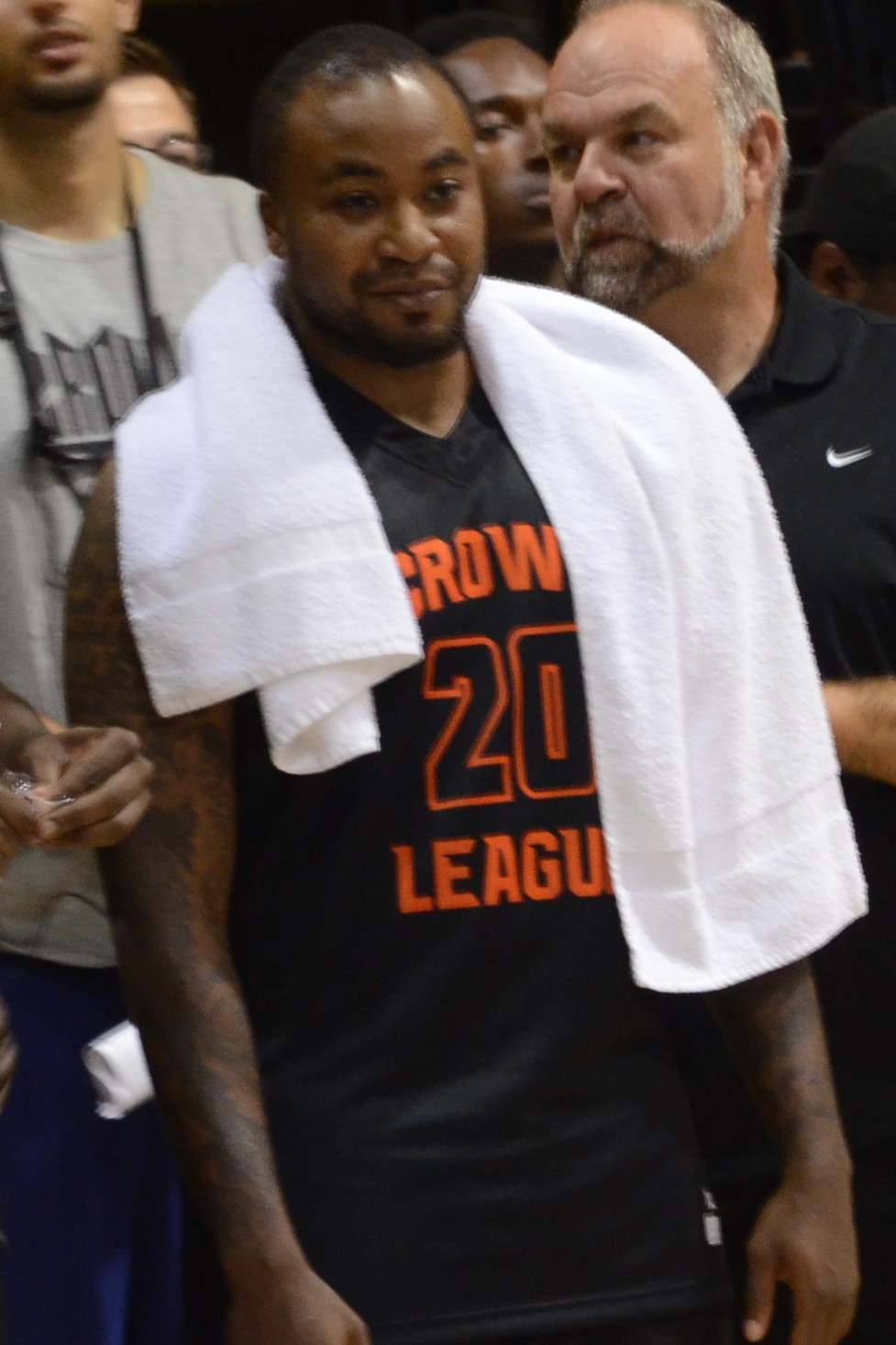
- Cadougan in 2016

Personal information
- Born: May 7, 1990 (age 36) Toronto, Ontario, Canada
- Listed height: 6 ft 1 in (1.85 m)
- Listed weight: 205 lb (93 kg)

Career information
- High school: Eastern Commerce (Toronto, Ontario); Community Christian (Stockbridge, Georgia); Christian Life Center (Humble, Texas)
- College: Marquette (2009–2013)
- NBA draft: 2013: undrafted
- Playing career: 2013–2023
- Position: Point guard
- Coaching career: 2023–present

Career history

Playing
- 2013–2014: Batumi-RSU
- 2014–2015: Sidigas Avellino
- 2015–2016: Aries Trikala
- 2016–2018: London Lightning
- 2018–2020: St. John's Edge
- 2020: Fraser Valley Bandits
- 2021: Ottawa Blackjacks
- 2021: Edmonton Stingers
- 2022: Newfoundland Growlers

Coaching
- 2023: Vancouver Bandits (assistant)

Career highlights
- NBL Canada champion (2017); NBL Canada Most Improved Player (2019)
- Stats at Basketball Reference
Medals
Men's basketball
Representing Canada
Pan American Games
Silver medal – second place	2015 Toronto

Junior Carlisle Cadougan (born May 7, 1990) is a Canadian former professional basketball player. Cadougan spent his college career at Marquette University. Following his graduation from college, he played professionally in Europe. He also represented Canada in international competition.

== Early life ==
Cadougan was born in Toronto, Ontario and raised in the city's Jane and Finch neighbourhood. The son of Carlisle Ford and Suzette Cadougan, he was raised by a single mother who was born in Trinidad and raised in St. Vincent, where his father is from. He grew up in a family of basketball players; his mother grew up playing netball, his older brother Kerlon played as a combo guard for Humber College, and his younger brother Shaquan also plays the sport.

On August 3, 2005, a drive-by shooting occurred at the family's housing complex during an outdoor party. A gunman sprayed the home with several bullets, four of which hit Cadougan's then four-year-old brother Shaquan, critically injuring him. Four other people were injured in the shooting, including Cadougan, who was grazed in the shoulder.

== High school career ==
Cadougan attended Eastern Commerce Collegiate Institute in Toronto for his freshman year, and played for the school's junior basketball team, scoring 37 points in his first game. After the 2005 shooting incident, and on the advice of his AAU coach Ro Russell, Cadougan transferred to Community Christian School in Stockbridge, Georgia, joining his friend and fellow prospect Olu Ashaolu. Repeating his freshman year, he averaged 18.8 points per game and was named to the all-underclassmen list by USA Today.

In 2006, Cadougan and Ashaolu both transferred to Christian Life Center Academy in Humble, Texas. Cadougan was a three-year letterman at the school, and in his 2008–09 senior year, he led the team to the National Association of Christian Athletes Elite Division I national championship; he was named the tournament's most outstanding offensive player. That season, he averaged 22 points, 8 assists, 5 rebounds, and 4 steals per game, was selected to play in the Reebok All-American Game, and was a McDonald's All-American nominee. Following the season, he was ranked the 50th overall prospect by Scout.com (fifth overall point guard), 60th by Rivals.com, and 74th by ESPN.com.

== College career ==
In 2009, Cadougan enrolled at Marquette University. He became the Golden Eagles' starting point guard in his junior season, in which the team won a Big East Conference championship and advanced to the Sweet Sixteen of the 2012 NCAA Tournament. In his senior season, the team won a second consecutive conference championship and advanced to the Elite Eight of the 2013 NCAA Tournament. That season, he averaged 8.5 points, 3.8 assists, 2.9 rebounds, and 1.1 steals per game, was named to the Big East All-Academic Team, and won the Big East Sportsmanship Award.

== Professional career ==
After going undrafted in 2013, Cadougan joined the Milwaukee Bucks for the 2013 NBA Summer League, appearing in only two games because of visa issues.

On August 28, 2013, Cadougan signed with Batumi-RSU of Georgia.

On August 23, 2014, Cadougan signed with Sidigas Avellino of the Italian Serie A.

On October 29, 2015, Cadougan signed with Trikala Aries B.C. of the Greek Basket League.

On November 29, 2016, Cadougan signed with the London Lightning of the National Basketball League of Canada. At his own request, he was released by the Lightning on February 7, 2018.

On September 5, 2018, Cadougan signed with the St. John's Edge of the NBL Canada. In the 2018-19 season, Cadougan averaged 12.9 points, 3.8 rebounds, and 4.8 assists per game. He was named to the All-NBLC Second Team, All-Canadian First Team, and Most Improved Player. He posted 14.8 points, 4.0 rebounds, and 4.9 assists per game during the 2019-20 season. Cadougan earned All-NBLC Second Team and All-Canadian First Team honors.

In 2020, Cadougan signed with the Fraser Valley Bandits of the Canadian Elite Basketball League, averaging 11.1 points, 3.1 rebounds, 4.1 assists, 1.3 steals and 26.3 minutes in eight games.

On March 23, 2021, Cadougan signed with the Ottawa Blackjacks. He joined the Edmonton Stingers for the 2021–22 BCL Americas.

== National team career ==
Cadougan played for the Canadian junior national team at the 2006 FIBA Americas Under-18 Championship, leading the team in scoring with 16.8 points per game. He played for the senior national team at the 2013 FIBA Americas Championship, 2015 Pan American Games, where he won a silver medal, and the 2017 FIBA AmeriCup.
