= Adrian Moss (basketball, born 1981) =

American basketball player

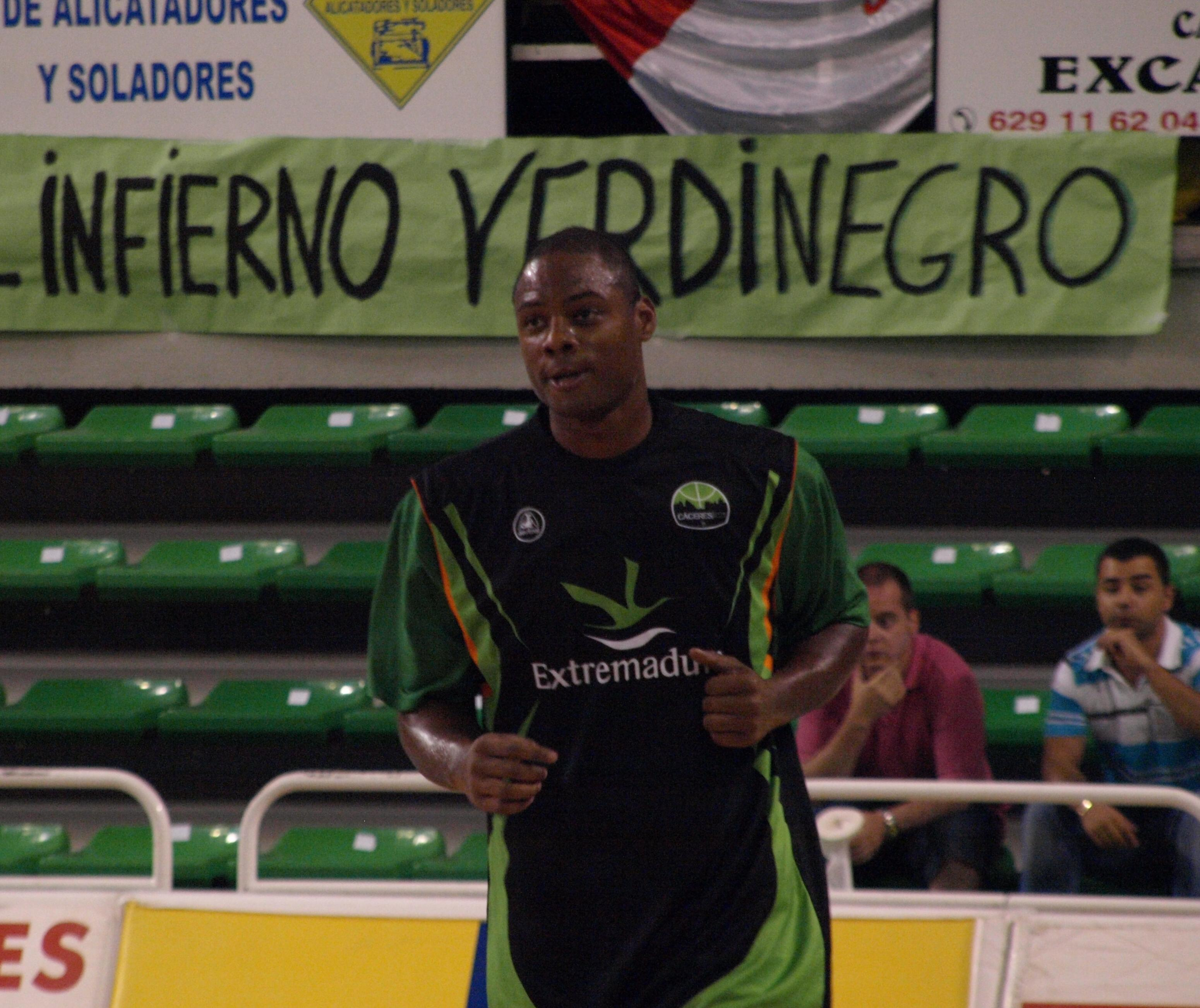
- Moss playing for Cáceres Ciudad del Baloncesto in 2008

Personal information
- Born: December 14, 1981 (age 44)
- Listed height: 6 ft 9 in (2.06 m)
- Listed weight: 219 lb (99 kg)

Career information
- High school: Humble High School; Fork Union Military Academy (Fork Union, Virginia)
- College: Florida (2002–2006)
- NBA draft: 2006: undrafted
- Playing career: 2006–2017
- Position: Power forward

Career history
- 2006–2007: Randers Cimbria
- 2007: Morges Basket
- 2007: Science City Jena
- 2007–2008: Villa de Los Barrios
- 2008–2009: Cáceres Ciudad del Baloncesto
- 2009–2010: Eisbären Bremerhaven
- 2010: Hapoel Kiryat Tiv'on
- 2010–2012: Palencia Baloncesto
- 2012: Unión Progresista
- 2013: Atlético Aguada
- 2013–2014: Bambitious Nara
- 2014: Niigata Albirex BB
- 2014–2015: Sendai 89ers
- 2015–2016: Stevnsgade Basketball
- 2016–2018: BMS Herlev Wolfpack

Career highlights
- NCAA champion (2006); Eurobasket.com All-Basketliga First Team 2006-07

Adrian Jamaal Moss (born December 14, 1981) is an American professional basketball coach and former player. he played college basketball for Florida. He was the captain of the Gators team that won the 2006 NCAA championship. Subsequently, he pursued a professional career, playing in several leagues in Europe, South America and Asia.

== Early life and career ==
Moss was born on December 14, 1981. After graduating from high school he had one year of prep school at Fork Union Military Academy.

== College career ==
Moss enrolled to the University of Florida in 2001, where he redshirted his freshman season. He had his only career double-double as a sophomore, with 16 points and 11 rebounds against Florida A&M. In the 2006 NCAA Tournament Final, he scored 9 points and grabbed 6 rebounds, coming off the bench, to help the Gators win the championship game. In four seasons at Florida, Moss played 123 games, averaging 3.8 points, 2.8 rebounds and 0.5 assists per game in 13.5 minutes per game.

== Professional career ==
After his graduation from Florida, Moss signed for Danish team Randers Cimbria. He averaged 25.4 points as well as 11.4 rebounds a game for Randers and was named to the Eurobasket.com All-Basketliga First Team, before moving to Morges Basket of Switzerland, to play for them in the playoffs. In June 2007 he signed for German team Science City Jena, from where he was dismissed on disciplinary grounds in October. On October 17, 2007, he signed for Spanish 2nd division team Villa de Los Barrios. In July 2008 he signed for he signed for Cáceres Ciudad del Baloncesto. He returned to Germany in the next season to play for Eisbären Bremerhaven. He played two games for Hapoel Kiryat Tiv'on of the Israeli 2nd division starting the 2010–11 season, only to sign for Palencia Baloncesto of the Spanish 2nd division in November 2010. He resigned for Palencia Baloncesto in August 2011, to play for a second season with the team. In October 2014 he joined the Sendai 89ers.

In September 2012 Moss moved continents to play for Unión Progresista of Argentina. In January 2013 he signed for Uruguayan club Atlético Aguada. Moss moved to the Bambitious Nara of Japan. Starting the 2014–15 season for the Niigata Albirex BB, he moved to the Sendai 89ers in the end of October 2014.

In 2015–16, Moss played for Stevnsgade Basketball in Denmark, before moving to BMS Herlev Wolfpack in the same country.

== Coaching career ==
While playing for BMS Herlev's men's team in Denmark, Moss also served as assistant coach of the same team and worked as coach in the club's youth set-up. In May 2021, he was named BMS Herlev head coach. He did not have his contract renewed after the conclusion of the 2023-24 season.
