= Charles Hinkle =

American basketball player (born 1988)

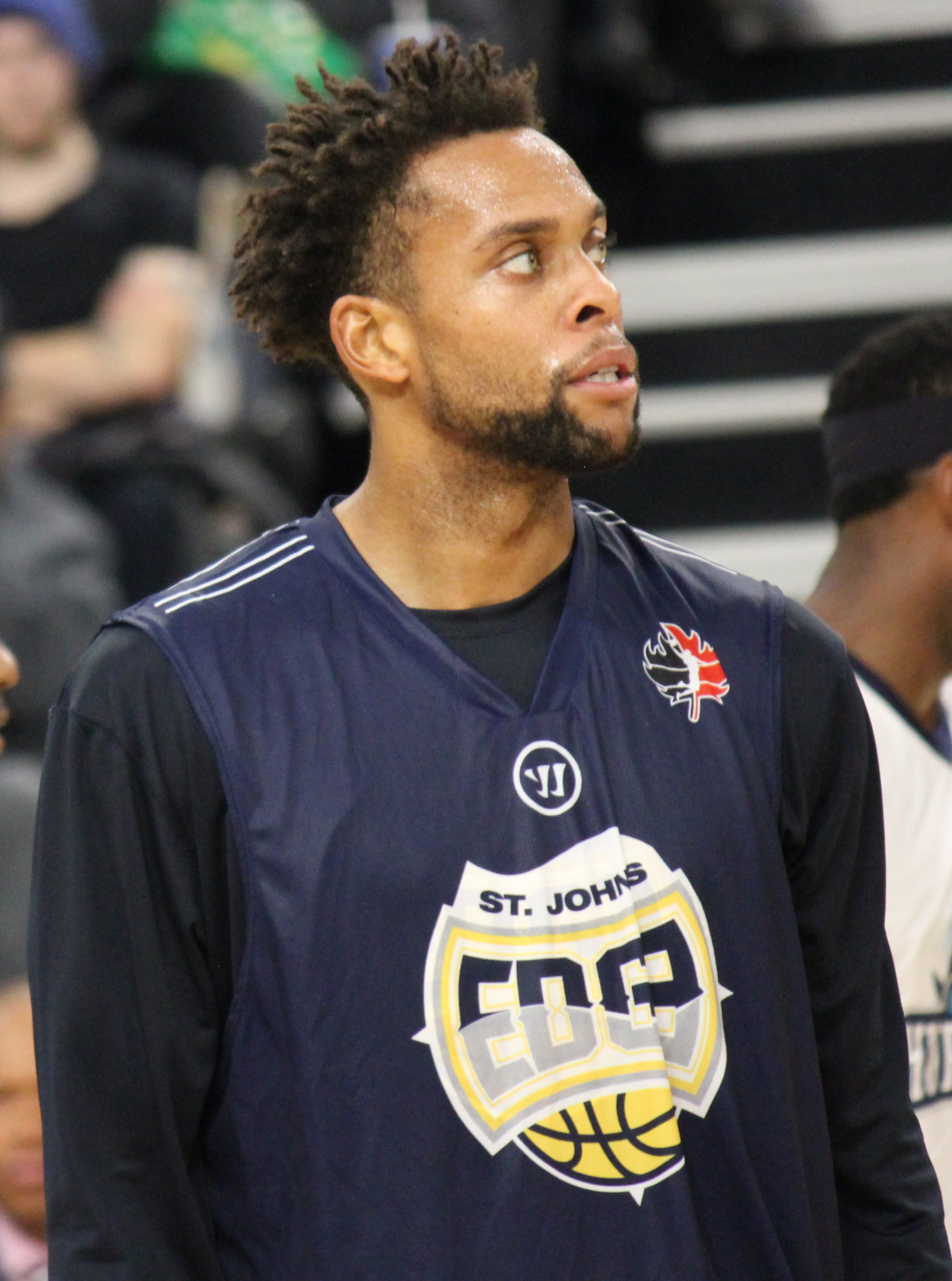
- Hinkle in November 2017

No. 73 – Franca Basquetebol Clube
- Position: Small forward
- League: Novo Basquete Brasil; BCL Americas

Personal information
- Born: March 11, 1988 (age 38) Los Alamitos, California
- Listed height: 6 ft 5 in (1.96 m)
- Listed weight: 205 lb (93 kg)

Career information
- High school: Los Alamitos (Los Alamitos, California); Hebron Academy (Hebron, Maine)
- College: Vanderbilt (2008–2010); American (2010–2012)
- NBA draft: 2012: undrafted
- Playing career: 2012–present

Career history
- 2012–2013: İstanbulspor
- 2013: Soproni KC
- 2013–2014: Hapoel Kiryat Tivon/Megido
- 2014: Los Angeles D-Fenders
- 2015: Idaho Stampede
- 2015: Niigata Albirex
- 2015–2016: Bambitious Nara
- 2017–2018: St. John's Edge
- 2018–2019: Club Biguá de Villa Biarritz
- 2019–2021: Koshigaya Alphas
- 2021–present: Nacional
- 2023-present: Franca Basquetebol Clube

Career highlights
- All-NBL Canada Second Team (2018); First-team All-Patriot League (2012)

Charles Phillip Hinkle (born March 11, 1988) is an American professional basketball player who plays for Franca Basquetebol Clube of the Novo Basquete Brasil. Born in the Los Angeles area, he played high school basketball at Los Alamitos High School before moving to Hebron Academy. He then joined Vanderbilt University to play for the Commodores and redshirted his freshman season. After receiving limited playing time, he transferred to the American Eagles for his final two years and was one of the top NCAA Division I scorers as a senior.

Immediately following his college career, Hinkle played for İstanbulspor in Turkey and Soproni KC in Hungary. In 2013–14, he spent time with the Israel club Hapoel Kiryat Tivon/Megido and in the Drew League. Hinkle was picked by the Los Angeles D-Fenders at the 2014 NBA Development League Draft and subsequently competed in the D-League for the D-Fenders and Idaho Stampede. In 2015, he began playing in Japan with Niigata Albirex and then Bambitious Nara. In 2018, he earned All-NBL Canada Second Team honors for the St. John's Edge.

== Early life and career ==
Hinkle was born in the Los Angeles area on March 11, 1988, to Terry and Carol Hinkle. He first attended Los Alamitos High School in Los Alamitos, California, where he started alongside future National Basketball Association (NBA) player Landry Fields. As a senior, Hinkle averaged 10.0 points and 5.0 rebounds per game, leading the team to a 29–5 record, its first California Interscholastic Federation (CIF) sectional championship, and an appearance at the California state semifinals. He earned All-Sunset League honors two times. After receiving no offers from NCAA Division I programs, he chose to play a postgraduate season at Hebron Academy in the remote town of Hebron, Maine. With his new team, Hinkle averaged 16.3 points, 5.9 rebounds and 2.1 assists per game. In the class of 2007, he was rated a two-star recruit by 247Sports.com.

College recruiting
Name	Hometown	School	Height	Weight	Commit date
Charles Hinkle; SG	Hebron, ME	Hebron Academy	6 ft 5 in (1.96 m)	210 lb (95 kg)	Jul 27, 2007
Charles Hinkle; SG	Recruit ratings: 247Sports:				
Overall recruit ranking: 247Sports: 705, 192 (SG)
Note: In many cases, Scout, Rivals, 247Sports, On3, and ESPN may conflict in their listings of height and weight.; In these cases, the average was taken. ESPN grades are on a 100-point scale.; Sources: "2007 Team Ranking". Rivals.

== College career ==
=== Vanderbilt ===
Early in his recruiting process, Hinkle drew strong interest from Virginia Tech, New Hampshire, Maine, Rhode Island, and Portland. He eventually committed to Vanderbilt over Iowa State and American. Before playing any games, Hinkle suffered a broken foot and chose to redshirt his freshman season. He spent the following months in rehabilitation and weight training, significantly improving his strength. Hinkle's debut for Vanderbilt was in a 74–48 win over Morehead State, grabbing one rebound in six minutes. At the 2008 Cancún Challenge, he played increased minutes due to the absences of Andre Walker and Festus Ezeli and won the championship. On December 31, 2008, he scored a career-high seven points against Saint Francis. Throughout the season, he had 2.0 points, 2.8 rebounds, and 1.8 assists in 8.8 minutes per game.

Hinkle started his redshirt sophomore season at Vanderbilt by playing four minutes, recording no statistics, in a 95–73 victory over Lipscomb on November 16, 2009. He played a season-high 10 minutes off the bench on December 5 against DePaul, contributing two points, four rebounds, and two assists in a 67–54 win. His best scoring effort as a sophomore came in his final game on December 21, when he posted four points versus Mercer. Hinkle played only 10 games in the season, and he averaged 1.4 points, 0.5 rebounds, and 0.2 assists in 4.7 minutes per game.

=== American ===
For the 2009–10 season, Hinkle chose to transfer to American. He became eligible to play for the team following the first semester. The program was already familiar with him because they had attempted to recruit him previously. He joined the team with hopes of playing more minutes, but he received little time playing behind Vlad Moldoveanu. Hinkle made his debut for American on December 14, 2010, with eight points, five rebounds, and a season-high three steals in 23 minutes off the bench to beat UMBC. In the following game, a loss to Northwestern, he played a career-high 24 minutes in which he posted nine points and five rebounds. On January 12, 2011, Hinkle had season-bests of 12 points and three assists in another defeat to Bucknell. Without starting in any of his 23 games as a redshirt junior, he averaged 4.5 points, 2.2 rebounds, 0.6 assists, and 0.5 steals in 13.1 minutes per game.

Hinkle saw major improvement and increase in playing time in his final season with American. He opened his redshirt senior year on November 11, 2011, versus Richmond, scoring 20 points and grabbing seven rebounds in 38 minutes in his first college start.

== Professional career ==
After going undrafted in 2012 NBA draft, Hinkle joined İstanbulspor of the Turkish Basketball Second League. He left İstanbulspor averaging 16.3 points, 5.5 rebounds, and 1.1 assists per game. In January 2013, he signed with Soproni KC of the Hungarian League for the remainder of the season. In 10 games for Soproni, Hinkle averaged 11.0 points, 5.9 rebounds, 1.0 assists, and 1.1 steals per game. For the 2013–14 season, he joined Hapoel Kiryat Tivon/Megido of the Israeli National League. He averaged 20.0 points, 7.0 rebounds, 2.9 assists, and 1.8 steals per game in 28 games with Kiryat Tivon. Eurobasket.com named him all-league honorable mention in May 2014.

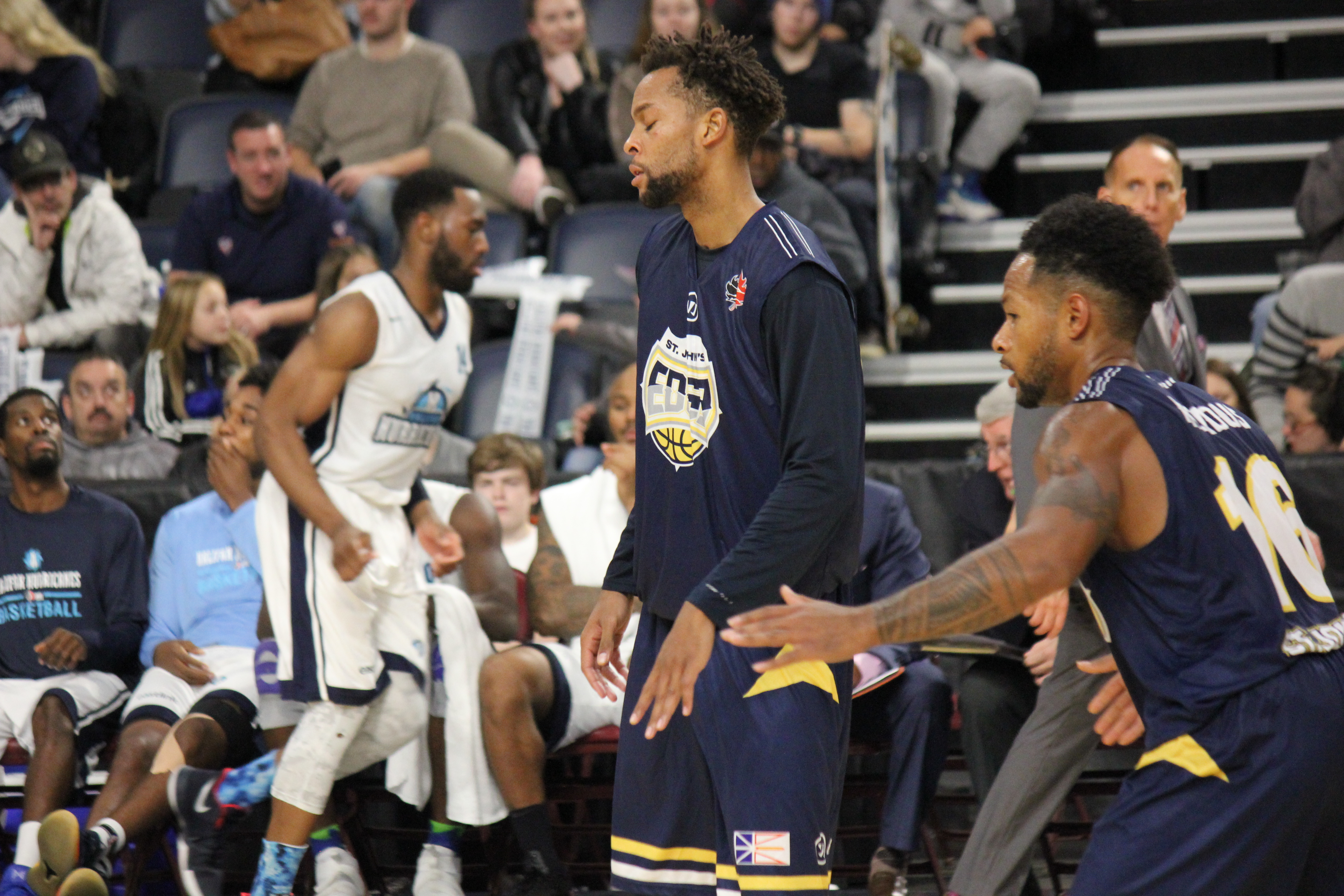
Hinkle (center) with the St. John's Edge in 2017.

At the 2014 NBA Development League Draft, Hinkle was selected in the fourth round with the 71st overall pick by the Los Angeles D-Fenders. He produced a season-high performance in his final game for the D-Fenders on December 13, 2014, recording three points, three rebounds, and one assist in a 134–123 win over the Idaho Stampede. He then suffered an injury that sidelined him for several months. On March 18, 2015, Hinkle signed with the Stampede. He scored a season-best 16 points on March 28 in an 86–106 defeat to the Sioux Falls Skyforce. In his last appearance for Idaho, on April 4, Hinkle notched 12 points, seven rebounds, and four assists off the bench to lead his team to a victory over the Texas Legends.

On August 27, 2015, Hinkle signed with the Japanese club Niigata Albirex of the bj league. In eight games with Albirex, he averaged 22.9 points, 5.1 rebounds, 1.8 assists, and 1.1 steals per game. In November, Hinkle moved to Bambitious Nara in the same league. He posted a team-high 22 points in a 99–79 win over Kagawa Five Arrows. As the season came to a close, he was averaging 15.0 points, 6.1 rebounds, 2.0 assists, and 1.1 steals in 34 appearances.

Hinkle, on October 18, 2017, signed with the St. John's Edge of the National Basketball League of Canada (NBLC). In his debut on November 19, he scored a team-best 21 points in a victory, 97–96, over the Island Storm. On December 13, he scored 53 points in a 103–99 win over the Windsor Express, three points shy of the league single-game record. Hinkle was named to the Second Team All-NBLC.

In November 2018, Hinkle signed with Club Biguá de Villa Biarritz of the Liga Uruguaya de Basketball.

In November 2021, Hinkle signed with Nacional to play both in the Uruguayan League and in the 2021–22 BCL Americas.

== Career statistics ==
=== Domestic leagues ===
==== Regular season ====
Legend
GP	Games played	MPG	Minutes per game	FG%	Field goal percentage
3P%	3-point field goal percentage	FT%	Free throw percentage	RPG	Rebounds per game
APG	Assists per game	SPG	Steals per game	BPG	Blocks per game
PPG	Points per game	**Bold**	Career high		Led the league

Note: Only games in the primary domestic competitions are included. Therefore, games in cup or European competitions are left out.

Year	Team	League	GP	MPG	FG%	3P%	FT%	RPG	APG	SPG	BPG	PPG	
2012–13	(Turkey) İstanbulspor	TBL	**20**		**30.5**	.455	.404	.773	5.2	1.1	1.0	0.2	**15.9**
2012–13	(Hungary) Soproni KC	NB I/A	10		25.9	.429	.182	.632	**5.9**	1.0	**1.1**	0.2	11.0
2014–15	(United States) Los Angeles D-Fenders	D-League	6		5.1	.333	.200	**1.000**	0.5	0.2	0.0	0.2	1.5
2014–15	(United States) Idaho Stampede	D-League	8		19.7	**.469**	**.444**	.615	3.0	**1.5**	0.3	**0.4**	8.3
