= Carl English =

Canadian basketball player and manager

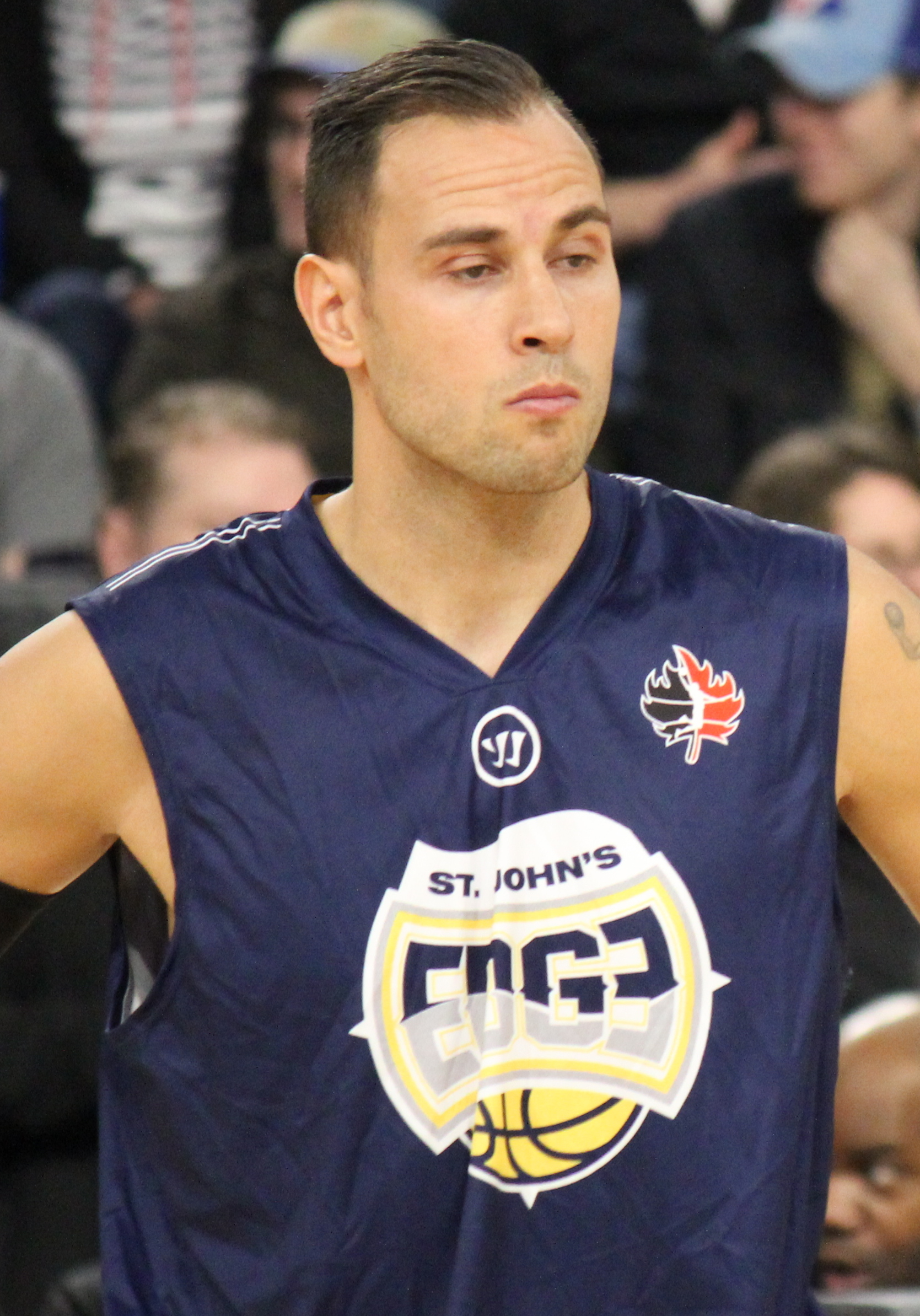
- English with the St. John's Edge in 2017

Personal information
- Born: February 2, 1981 (age 45) St. John's, Newfoundland, Canada (Note: In 2001, after English was born, his birth province changed its name to Newfoundland and Labrador.)
- Listed height: 6 ft 4 in (1.93 m)
- Listed weight: 205 lb (93 kg)

Career information
- High school: Fatima Academy (St. Bride's, Newfoundland); St. Thomas Aquinas (Oakville, Ontario)
- College: Hawaii (1999–2003)
- NBA draft: 2003: undrafted
- Playing career: 2003–2020
- Position: Shooting guard

Career history
- 2003–2005: Florida Flame (Note: During the 2003–04 season, the team was known as the Charleston Lowgators, before relocating to Fort Myers, Florida as the Florida Flame.)
- 2005–2006: Virtus Bologna
- 2006–2007: Zadar
- 2007–2009: Gran Canaria
- 2009–2010: Baskonia
- 2010–2011: Joventut
- 2011–2012: Cajasol Sevilla
- 2012–2013: Estudiantes
- 2014: Canarias
- 2014–2015: AEK Athens
- 2016: Caciques de Humacao
- 2016: Canarias
- 2016–2017: Alba Berlin
- 2017–2020: St. John's Edge

Career highlights
- NBL Canada Most Valuable Player (2018); NBL Canada Canadian of the Year (2018); All-NBL Canada First Team (2018); NBL Canada All-Canada First Team (2018); Spanish League Top Scorer (2013); Spanish League champion (2010); Croatian Cup winner (2007); ABA League All-Star MVP (2007); ABA League All-Star (2007); First-team All-WAC (2003); Second-team All-WAC (2002)
Medals
Men's basketball
Representing Canada
Pan American Games
Silver medal – second place	2015 Toronto

Carl Jerome English (born February 2, 1981) is a Canadian former professional basketball player and general manager for the St. John's Edge of the National Basketball League of Canada. A shooting guard, he has also played for the Canadian national team.

Born in St. John's, Newfoundland, English was a member of the provincial youth team and shone with his local school Fatima Academy, before moving to St. Thomas Aquinas. He spent four seasons at the NCAA Division I level with Hawaii, the first of which he redshirted due to injury. He earned All-WAC accolades in his final two years of college and left with the second-most career three-pointers in school history.

After going undrafted in the 2003 NBA draft, English began his professional career in the NBA D-League. In 2005, he signed with Italian team Virtus Bologna. English subsequently joined Zadar in Croatia, where he was one of the best scorers. In 2007, he moved to Spain for several years, leading the top Spanish league in scoring with Estudiantes in 2013. He returned to his hometown in 2017 with NBL Canada team St. John's Edge and was named Most Valuable Player and Canadian of the Year in his first season.

== Early life ==
English was born in St. John's, Newfoundland in Canada to Kevin and Lavinia English and had four brothers, named Peter, Michael, Bradley, and Kevin Jr. When he was five years old, his family's house caught fire in March 1986, but he escaped with his brothers. However, his parents suffered severe burns and both died in the next month. As a result, English began living with his aunt and uncle, Betty and Junior McGrath, and with his cousins in Patrick's Cove-Angels Cove, a remote community in Newfoundland. His brothers were separated among different family relatives.

In Patrick's Cove-Angels Cove, English practiced basketball on a makeshift hoop built by his uncle beside Route 100, a two-lane highway in front of their house. He often played with his brothers when they visited. In eighth grade, English was the starting point guard for Fatima Academy in the nearby town of St. Bride's, averaging 50 points per game. He was named team most valuable player (MVP) and was also a member of the varsity cross country team. At age 16, English joined the provincial basketball team at the 1997 Canada Summer Games, where he was a starter despite being younger than most of his opponents.

For his senior year, English transferred to St. Thomas Aquinas Catholic Secondary School in Oakville, Ontario, a program that had produced NCAA Division I players. He started living with his cousin Howie. After a labor dispute suspended the school's basketball program for a year, English considered returning home. However, he remained after joining a Canadian under-18 team that competed across the United States. His success with the team drew attention from top college programs, including Georgetown, Michigan, and Syracuse.

== College career ==
Holding about 50 scholarship offers from college programs, English decided to attend the University of Hawaii and play for the Rainbow Warriors. He became the third player from Newfoundland to play NCAA Division I basketball. English only played 2 games in his first season before undergoing season-ending surgery on his left ankle. He averaged 2 points and 1 rebound per game and was allowed to redshirt the season. As a redshirt freshman, he averaged 4.9 points, 3.1 rebounds, and 1.6 assists per game, coming off the bench through 28 games. He scored a season-high 25 points in a championship game win over Tulsa at the 2001 WAC tournament, in which he was named MVP.

In his sophomore season, English averaged 15.5 points, 5.1 rebounds, and 3.3 assists per game, earning second-team All-WAC honors. On February 21, 2002, he scored 28 points, shooting 5-of-7 from three-point range, against Tulsa. English posted a season-best 33 points in a win over Fresno State on March 2, as Hawaii claimed a share of the WAC regular season title. He averaged 19.6 points, 5.4 rebounds, and 2.4 assists per game in his junior campaign and was named first-team All-WAC and to the All-WAC Tournament team. On January 14, 2003, English erupted for 30 points against Fresno State. Later in the month, he scored 30 points again, in an 85–70 win over Rice. On February 2, 2003, English tallied 28 points, with a career-high 8 three-pointers, to guide his team past Tulsa. He broke Hawaii's single-season three-pointer record, with 89, and ranked second in school history in career three-pointers.

== Professional career ==
=== NBA D-League stint (2003–2005) ===
Despite having one more year of college eligibility, English entered the 2003 NBA draft, confident that he would be selected by a team. After going undrafted, he joined the Indiana Pacers for NBA training camp, where he impressed general manager Larry Bird. On October 26, English was waived by the Pacers. On November 6, he was selected with the 11th overall pick in the 2003 National Basketball Development League draft by the Charleston Lowgators. In 2003, he was also picked by the Idaho Stampede in the fourth round of the Continental Basketball Association (CBA) draft. Through 45 games with the Lowgators, English averaged 8.4 points, 2 rebounds, and 0.9 assists in 19.1 minutes per game. He ranked second in the league with 50 three-pointers. On October 5, 2004, English signed with the Seattle SuperSonics in the NBA but was waived 10 days later. He returned to the D-League with his old team, which had relocated and changed its name to the Florida Flame. Through 48 games, English averaged 14.6 points, 4.3 rebounds, and 3.1 assists per game, shooting 46% from the field. He finished with the fifth most points in the league.

=== Move to Europe (2005–2007) ===
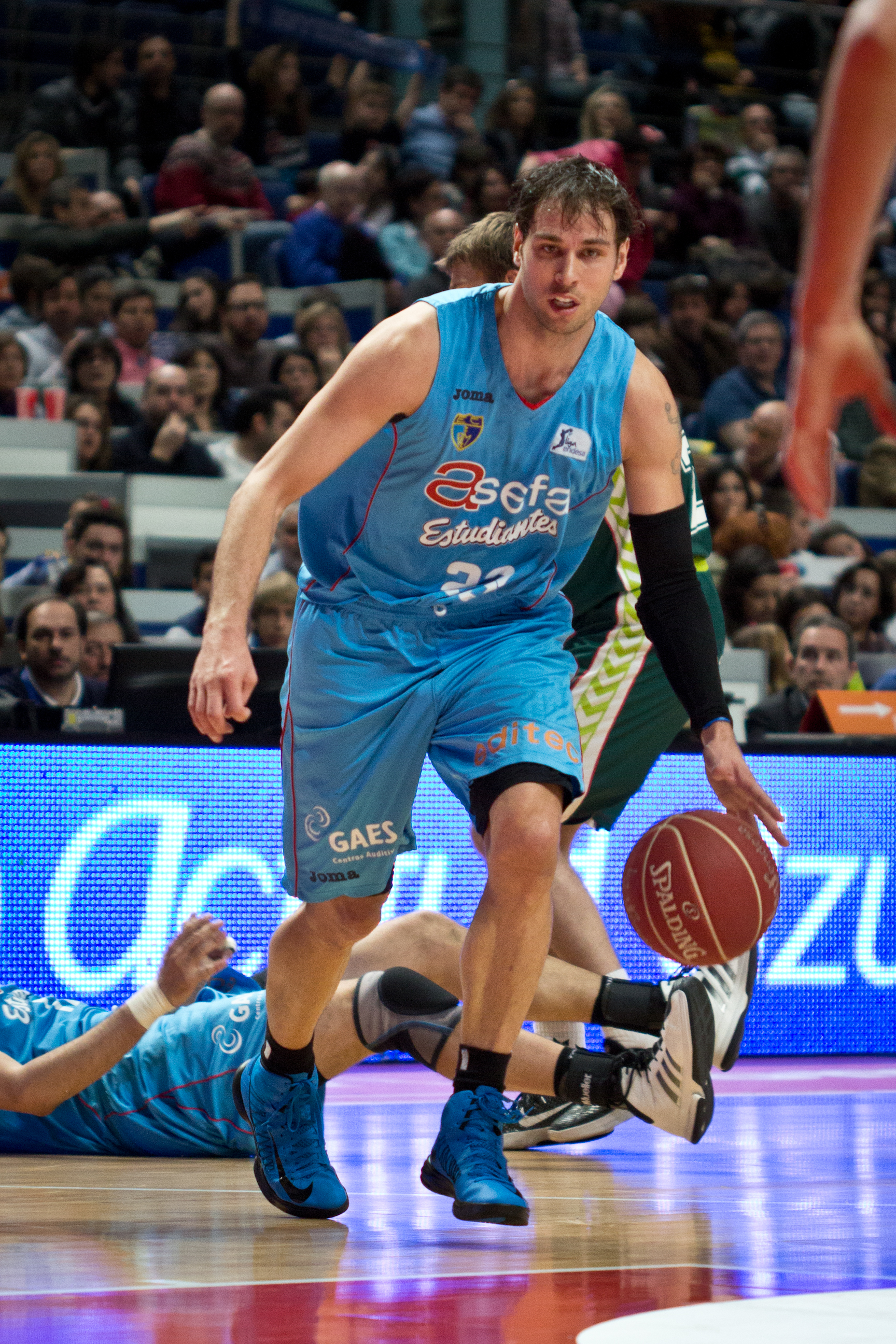
English dribbles the ball for Spanish team Estudiantes in February 2013.

English played for the Cleveland Cavaliers at 2005 NBA Summer League. For the 2005–06 season, he played with Virtus Bologna of the Italian Lega Basket Serie A. Through 25 games, English averaged 7.6 points, 3 rebounds, and 1.6 steals in 19.9 minutes per game. On December 28, 2005, he scored a season-high 22 points, with 5 three-pointers, in an 84–78 loss to Reggiana. In 2006–07, English signed with Zadar of the Croatian League and ABA League, leading the team to a Croatian National Cup victory. He finished second in the Croatian League in scoring, with 27 points per game, and earned all-league second team honors from basketball website Eurobasket. In addition, he was named ABA League All-Star and won the All-Star MVP award.

=== Success in Spain (2007–2014) ===
On July 27, 2007, English signed with Spanish team Gran Canaria of the Liga ACB and ULEB Cup for the 2007–08 season. Through 34 ACB games, he averaged 15.2 points, 3.4 rebounds, and 2.2 assists per game. Through 14 ULEB Cup games, English averaged 15.9 points, 4.1 rebounds, and 2.4 assists per game. In his debut on October 6, 2007, he recorded a team-high 18 points and 4 steals in a 68–61 win over Sevilla. On December 9, English scored 26 points, shooting 4-of-7 on three-pointers, in an 85–79 loss to Granada. He scored a season-high 28 points in 25 minutes on January 20, 2008, against FC Barcelona. On August 3, 2008, English re-signed with Gran Canaria for one more season. He averaged 15.2 points, 3.4 rebounds, and 2.2 assists per game through 33 ACB games. English averaged 15.9 points, 4.1 rebounds, and 2.4 assists per game through 6 EuroCup games. (Note: Beginning in its 2008–09 season, the ULEB Cup was renamed to the EuroCup.) He made his season debut on October 8, 2008, scoring 20 points in a 76–68 loss to Zaragoza.

In 2009, he left CB Gran Canaria and joined Caja Laboral for the 2009–10 season, where he averaged 9.3 points and 2.8 rebounds per game in the ACB League. On 3 August 2010, he signed with DKV Joventut. In August 2011 he moved to Cajasol Sevilla.

One year later, he signs for CB Estudiantes leaving the team in 2013 without finishing the season.

Another year later, in March 2014, English agreed terms with Iberostar Tenerife.

=== Twilight years (2014–2017) ===
On November 5, 2014, English signed with AEK Athens of the Greek Basketball League.

=== Return to Canada (2017–present) ===
On November 15, 2017, English signed with the St. John's Edge of the National Basketball League of Canada. In his season debut versus the Island Storm on November 18, he made a game-winning three-pointer with about 4 seconds left. On March 3, 2018, English broke the league's single-game scoring record with 58 points in a 127–117 win over the KW Titans. He finished the season with 23.7 points per game, second in the league behind Royce White.

== National team career ==
English has been part of Canada Basketball since 2000. He has been a crucial component of the Canadian national basketball team in recent years and spent the summer of 2008 playing with the Canadian national team, trying to help them qualify for the 2008 Olympics.

The following summer English also participated in the 2009 FIBA Americas Championship, he helped lead Canada to a 4th-place finish losing in the 3rd place game to Argentina.

== Personal life ==
English is married to his high school sweetheart Mandy and has three children: son Ryder, and daughters Kirsten and Kylie.
