= St. John's Edge =

Basketball team in St. John's, Canada

- League: NBL Canada
- Founded: 2017
- History: St. John's Edge; 2017–2020
- Arena: Mile One Centre
- Location: St. John's, Newfoundland and Labrador
- Team colours: Navy blue, gold and grey
- General manager: Carl English
- Head coach: Steven Marcus
- Ownership: Atlantic Sport Enterprises Ltd. (Irwin Simon, Robert Sabbagh)
- Website: sjedge.ca

The St. John's Edge were a Canadian professional basketball team based in St. John's, Newfoundland and Labrador, that competed in the National Basketball League of Canada. From 2017 to 2020, they played home games at Mile One Centre. They were given a leave of absence from the league in 2021 due to not having a suitable home arena after not being given a new lease for Mile One Centre.

== History ==
On September 18, 2017, the city of St. John's approved the team to play at Mile One Centre. The team is owned by Atlantic Sport Enterprises Ltd, then consisting of John Graham with Irwin Simon and Robert Sabbagh. On September 28, 2017, St. John's named Jeff Dunlap head coach and Doug Plumb assistant coach. Due to a couple of teams in Ontario dropping out for the season causing a divisional imbalance and the lateness in the addition of the Edge, the team played its inaugural season as a member of the Central Division with the teams from Ontario.

The Edge signed Newfoundland native Carl English, who then finished second in the league in points per game and was named league MVP for the 2017–18 season. The Edge finished the 2017–18 season second in the division and advanced to the division finals in the playoffs before losing to eventual league champions London Lightning. Head coach and general manager Jeff Dunlap departed after the season to take an assistant coach job at California State University, Northridge and was replaced by assistant Doug Plumb. In June 2018, Carl English took over general manager duties for the Edge, while remaining a player on the team.

Prior to the 2018–19 season, the NBL Canada added another team in Ontario called the Sudbury Five, but lost another in the Niagara River Lions, creating another divisional imbalance and keeping the Edge in the Central Division. The league decided to play as a single table for the regular season to ease the Edge's travel, but still used the team's overall record in the divisional standings for playoff qualification. At the start of the season, head coach Doug Plumb was suspended two games for tampering, and was temporarily replaced by assistant Steven Marcus. On March 19, 2019, Plumb resigned and Marcus was again named the interim head coach. Marcus was retained as head coach for the 2019–20 season. The Edge were placed in the Atlantic Division for the 2019–20 season after the division lost teams in Cape Breton and Saint John, but the season was curtailed by the onset of the COVID-19 pandemic while the Edge were in second place in their division and no playoffs were held. The league did not hold a 2020–21 season due to the ongoing restrictions during the pandemic.

On July 15, 2021, the Edge were unable to secure a lease with St. John's Sports and Entertainment (SJSE), the group that owns Mile One Centre, and were announced as not returning to the venue for the 2022 season. The Edge's ownership had been negotiating with the arena alongside Deacon Sports and Entertainment (DSE), the majority owner of the arena's hockey tenant Newfoundland Growlers, where DSE would have taken over as primary owner of the Edge upon the lease renewal. DSE chose not to sign the lease as SJSE had included terms that the Edge's debts for the installation of a 360 LED board must be rectified or taken on by DSE. SJSE instead awarded a lease to an outside ownership group, 2001 Investments Limited, and their American Basketball Association franchise. On September 10, the sale of the Edge to DSE was approved by the league if an arena deal could be settled. DSE stated they were committed to keeping the Edge in the region, but no home arena was announced at the time. The Growlers were also evicted from the arena in October 2021 leading an on-going lease dispute between SJSE and DSE. The Edge were granted a leave of absence by the league in November 2021 in order to obtain a new lease and the sale of the team to DSE was not finalized. After the deal for the Edge fell through, DSE instead struck a deal to operate a new basketball team in the Canadian Elite Basketball League, which they also named the Newfoundland Growlers. The team folded shortly after the conclusion of their only season in the CEBL.

== Personnel ==
=== Final season roster ===
Note: Flags indicate national team eligibility at FIBA-sanctioned events. Players may hold other non-FIBA nationalities not displayed.

St. John's Edge roster
Players
Coaches
|

Pos.	No.	Nat.	Name	Ht.	Wt.	Age
G/F	3	(United States)	Brandon, Montay	6 ft 8 in (2.03 m)	225 lb (102 kg)	33 – 3 September 1993
PG	15	(United States)	Broome, Cane	6 ft 0 in (1.83 m)	165 lb (75 kg)	31 – 29 November 1994
F	13	(Canada)	Burnatowski, Murphy	6 ft 5 in (1.96 m)	229 lb (104 kg)	36 – 18 July 1990
PG	55	(Canada)	Cadougan, Junior	6 ft 1 in (1.85 m)	205 lb (93 kg)	36 – 7 May 1990
C	7	(United States)	Edwards, Mike	6 ft 9 in (2.06 m)	235 lb (107 kg)	29 – 20 May 1997
PG	2	(United States)	Jones, Jesse	6 ft 0 in (1.83 m)	183 lb (83 kg)	33 – 10 January 1993
PF	22	(United States)	Macon, Elijah	6 ft 9 in (2.06 m)	240 lb (110 kg)	32 – 3 November 1993
SF	9	(Canada)	Moffat, Noel	6 ft 5 in (1.96 m)	190 lb (86 kg)	33 – 9 August 1993
SG	4	(United States)	Richardson, Ryan	6 ft 4 in (1.93 m)	195 lb (88 kg)	30 – 14 November 1995
G/F	14	(United States)	Thomas, Ahmad	6 ft 3 in (1.91 m)	220 lb (100 kg)	31 – 8 February 1995
G/F	20	(United States)	Ward, Karrington	6 ft 7 in (2.01 m)	205 lb (93 kg)	33 – 14 March 1993
F	1	(Canada)	Watson, Tyrone	6 ft 5 in (1.96 m)	225 lb (102 kg)	36 – 12 July 1990

Head coach

- (United States) Steven Marcus

Assistant coach(es)

- (Canada) Jeff Morrison
- (Canada) Glen Sooley

Team manager

- (Canada) Carl English

Legend

- (C) Team captain
- (I) Inactive
- Injured

- Roster
- Transactions
Updated: December 23, 2019

=== Franchise leaders ===
Statistics (regular season) as of the end of the 2017–18 season

Statistic	Leader
Points	Charles Hinkle (817)
Rebounds	Charles Hinkle (248)
Assists	Alex Johnson (225)
Steals	Charles Hinkle (44)
Blocks	Charles Hinkle (21)

=== Notable players ===
Note: Flags indicate national team eligibility at FIBA-sanctioned events. Players may hold other non-FIBA nationalities not displayed.

Criteria

To appear in this section a player must have either:

- Set a club record or won an individual award while at the club
- Played at least one official international match for their national team at any time
- Played at least one official NBA match at any time.

- (Canada) Ransford Brempong (2018)
- (Albania) Rashaun Broadus (2017–2018)
- (Canada) Junior Cadougan (2018–2020)
- (United States) Glen Davis (2018–2019)
- (Canada) Carl English (2017–2019)
- (Canada) Grandy Glaze (2017–2018)
- (United States) Charles Hinkle (2017–2018)
- (Canada) Alex Johnson (2017–2018)
- (Democratic Republic of the Congo) Chadrack Lufile (2018)
- (Jamaica) Ryan Reid (2018)
- (India) Satnam Singh (2018–2019)

== Season-by-season record ==
Cited from NBLCanada.ca

Season	Coach	Regular season					Postseason				
Season	Coach	GP	Won	Lost	Win %	Finish	GP	Won	Lost	Win %	Result
2017–18	Jeff Dunlap	40	25	15	.625	2nd in Central Division	9	5	4	.556	Lost in Division Finals
2018–19	Doug Plumb; Steven Marcus	40	21	19	.525	2nd in Central Division	15	7	8	.467	Lost League Finals
2019–20	Steven Marcus	20	11	9	.550	Season curtailed by the COVID-19 pandemic					
Totals		100	57	43	.570	—	24	12	12	.500	—
