= CEBL Player of the Year =

The CEBL Player of the Year Award, also referred to as the CEBL Most Valuable Player, is an annual award given to the most valuable player in the Canadian Elite Basketball League. Since the establishment of the league in 2019, the award has been given annually. Xavier Moon won the first three awards.

== Winners ==
Key
Player (X)	Name of the player and number of times they had won the award at that point (if more than one)
†	Denotes player whose team won championship that year
^	Denotes player who is still active in the CEBL

Season	Player	Position	Nationality	Club	Ref
2019	Xavier Moon	Guard	United States	Edmonton Stingers	
2020	Xavier Moon (2)	Guard	United States	Edmonton Stingers^{†}	
2021	Xavier Moon (3)	Guard	United States	Edmonton Stingers^{†}	
2022	Khalil Ahmad	Guard	United States	Niagara River Lions	
2023	Teddy Allen	Guard	United States	Winnipeg Sea Bears	
2024	Tazé Moore	Guard	United States	Vancouver Bandits	
2025	Mitch Creek	Forward	Australia	Vancouver Bandits	

== Awards by player ==
Player	Total	Years
Xavier Moon	3	2019, 2020, 2021
Khalil Ahmad	1	2022
Teddy Allen	1	2023
Tazé Moore	1	2024
Mitch Creek	1	2025
