= 2021 CEBL–U Sports Draft =

Canadian Elite Basketball League draft

General information
- Sport: Basketball
- Date: April 14, 2021

Overview
- 21 total selections in 3 rounds
- League: Canadian Elite Basketball League
- Teams: 7
- First selection: Nervens Demosthene, Saskatchewan Rattlers

The 2021 CEBL–U Sports Draft is the Third CEBL Draft, being revealed on April 14. Seven Canadian Elite Basketball League (CEBL) teams will select 21 athletes in total.

== Format ==
the draft order for the first round is determine by how the teams finished in the 2020 CEBL season, Saskatchewan Rattlers finished last place last season so they get first overall. A "snake draft" was used, with the order reversing in even-numbered rounds, and the original order in odd-numbered rounds. The draft order for the first round was determined as follows:

1. Saskatchewan Rattlers
2. Niagara River Lions
3. Guelph Knighthawks
4. Ottawa BlackJacks
5. Hamilton Honey Badgers
6. Fraser Valley Bandits
7. Edmonton Stingers

== Eligibility ==
Players may completed their university eligibility in 2020–21, or they may be returning to their university team in the fall and be classified within the CEBL's U SPORTS Developmental player program. They must qualify as Canadian, and they must have completed at least one full year of eligibility at their U SPORTS institution. Each CEBL club must have at least one U SPORTS player on its 10-man active roster at all times.

== Player selection ==
=== Round 1 ===
Pick	Team	Player	Hometown	School team
1	Saskatchewan Rattlers	Nervens Demosthene	Terrebonne, Quebec	Bishop's University
2	Niagara River Lions	Emmanuel Owootoah	Toronto, Ontario	Brock University
3	Guelph Nighthawks	Isiah Osborne	Windsor, Ontario	Carleton University
4	Ottawa Blackjacks	Ali Sow	Ottawa, Ontario	Wilfrid Laurier
5	Hamilton Honey Badgers	Keevan Veinot	Port Williams, NS	Dalhousie University
6	Fraser Valley Bandits	Anthony Tsegakele	Gatineau, QB	Brandon University
7	Edmonton Stingers	Alex Carson	Halifax, NS	Dalhousie University

=== Round 2 ===
Pick	Team	Player	Hometown	School team
8	Edmonton Stingers	DeAndrae Pierre	Brampton, ON	York University
9	Fraser Valley Bandits	Adam Paige	Surrey, BC	University of Alberta
10	Hamilton Honey Badgers	Thomas Kennedy	Windsor, ON	University of Windsor
11	Ottawa Blackjacks	Guillaume Pépin	Montreal, Quebec	University of Ottawa
12	Guelph Nighthawks	Jordan Henry	Pickering, ON	McMaster University
13	Niagara River Lions	Lloyd Pandi	Ottawa, Ontario	Carleton University
14	Saskatchewan Rattlers	Alexander Dewar	Saskatoon, Saskatchewan	University of Saskatchewan

=== Round 3 ===
Pick	Team	Player	Hometown	School team
15	Saskatchewan Rattlers	Tyrese Potoma	Regina, Saskatchewan	University of Saskatchewan
16	Niagara River Lions	Grant Shephard	Kelowna, BC	Carleton University
17	Guelph Nighthawks	Cole Long	St. John's, NL	Memorial University
18	Ottawa Blackjacks	Graddy Kanku	Montreal, Quebec	Ontario Tech
19	Hamilton Honey Badgers	Mychael Paulo	Toronto, ON	McMaster University
20	Fraser Valley Bandits	Grant Audu	Mississauga, ON	University of British Columbia
21	Edmonton Stingers	Colton Gibb	Lethbridge, AB	University of Lethbridge
