= List of 2021–22 NBA season free agents =

The NBA's free agency period began on August 2 at 6 P.M. EST.

Players would be allowed to sign new offers starting on August 6 at 12 p.m. ET, after the moratorium ended.

== Free agents ==
^{®}	Denotes unsigned players whose free-agent rights were renounced
	Denotes sign and trade players
	Denotes player who is signed after buyout
	Denotes signed player who failed to make opening day roster
	Denotes player whose deal was later turned into a two-way contract
	Denotes player signed to 10-day contract

Player	Date signed	New team	Former team	Ref
Andre Drummond	August 4	Philadelphia 76ers	Los Angeles Lakers	
Cody Zeller	August 4	Portland Trail Blazers	Charlotte Hornets	
Solomon Hill	August 5	Atlanta Hawks		
Keifer Sykes	August 5	Indiana Pacers	South East Melbourne Phoenix (Australia)	
Terry Taylor	August 5	Indiana Pacers	Austin Peay (Undrafted in 2021)	
Jarrett Allen (RFA)	August 6	Cleveland Cavaliers		
Carmelo Anthony	August 6	Los Angeles Lakers	Portland Trail Blazers	
Trevor Ariza	August 6	Los Angeles Lakers	Miami Heat	
Kent Bazemore	August 6	Los Angeles Lakers	Golden State Warriors	
Khem Birch	August 6	Toronto Raptors		
Nemanja Bjelica	August 6	Golden State Warriors	Miami Heat	
Reggie Bullock	August 6	Dallas Mavericks	New York Knicks	
John Collins (RFA)	August 6	Atlanta Hawks		
Mike Conley Jr.	August 6	Utah Jazz		
Terence Davis (RFA)	August 6	Sacramento Kings		
Dewayne Dedmon	August 6	Miami Heat		
Spencer Dinwiddie	August 6	Washington Wizards	Brooklyn Nets	
Wayne Ellington	August 6	Los Angeles Lakers	Detroit Pistons	
Rudy Gay	August 6	Utah Jazz	San Antonio Spurs	
Devonte' Graham (RFA)	August 6	New Orleans Pelicans	Charlotte Hornets	
George Hill	August 6	Milwaukee Bucks	Philadelphia 76ers (Waived on August 3)	
Richaun Holmes	August 6	Sacramento Kings		
Rodney Hood	August 6	Milwaukee Bucks	Toronto Raptors (Waived on August 3)	
Talen Horton-Tucker (RFA)	August 6	Los Angeles Lakers		
Dwight Howard	August 6	Los Angeles Lakers	Philadelphia 76ers	
James Johnson	August 6	Brooklyn Nets	New Orleans Pelicans	
Saben Lee (RFA)	August 6	Detroit Pistons (Previously on a two-way contract)		
Robin Lopez	August 6	Orlando Magic	Washington Wizards	
Kyle Lowry	August 6	Miami Heat	Toronto Raptors	
Trey Lyles	August 6	Detroit Pistons	San Antonio Spurs	
Ben McLemore	August 6	Portland Trail Blazers	Los Angeles Lakers	
T. J. McConnell	August 6	Indiana Pacers		
Malik Monk	August 6	Los Angeles Lakers	Charlotte Hornets	
Markieff Morris	August 6	Miami Heat	Los Angeles Lakers	
Abdel Nader	August 6	Phoenix Suns		
Raul Neto	August 6	Washington Wizards		
Georges Niang	August 6	Philadelphia 76ers	Utah Jazz	
Kendrick Nunn	August 6	Los Angeles Lakers	Miami Heat	
Semi Ojeleye	August 6	Milwaukee Bucks	Boston Celtics	
Kelly Olynyk	August 6	Detroit Pistons	Houston Rockets	
Chris Paul*	August 6	Phoenix Suns		
Cameron Payne	August 6	Phoenix Suns		
Otto Porter Jr.	August 6	Golden State Warriors	Orlando Magic	
Bobby Portis*	August 6	Milwaukee Bucks		
Norman Powell	August 6	Portland Trail Blazers		
Duncan Robinson (RFA)	August 6	Miami Heat		
Max Strus (RFA)	August 6	Miami Heat (Previously on a two-way contract)		
Gabe Vincent (RFA)	August 6	Miami Heat (Previously on a two-way contract)		
Hassan Whiteside	August 6	Utah Jazz	Sacramento Kings	
Lou Williams	August 6	Atlanta Hawks		
Ömer Yurtseven**	August 6	Miami Heat		
Jarrell Brantley (RFA)	August 7	Utah Jazz (Previously on a two-way contract)		
D. J. Carton	August 7	Charlotte Hornets	Marquette (Undrafted in 2021)	
Danny Green	August 7	Philadelphia 76ers		
Maurice Harkless	August 7	Sacramento Kings		
Doug McDermott	August 7	San Antonio Spurs	Indiana Pacers	
Victor Oladipo	August 7	Miami Heat		
Kelly Oubre Jr.	August 7	Charlotte Hornets	Golden State Warriors	
Ish Smith	August 7	Charlotte Hornets	Washington Wizards	
Daniel Theis	August 7	Houston Rockets	Chicago Bulls	
Gary Trent Jr. (RFA)	August 7	Toronto Raptors		
P. J. Tucker	August 7	Miami Heat	Milwaukee Bucks	
Ish Wainright	August 7	Toronto Raptors	SIG Strasbourg (France)	
Justise Winslow**	August 7	Los Angeles Clippers	Memphis Grizzlies	
Lonzo Ball (RFA)	August 8	Chicago Bulls	New Orleans Pelicans	
DeAndre' Bembry	August 8	Brooklyn Nets	Toronto Raptors (Waived on August 3)	
Bruce Brown (RFA)	August 8	Brooklyn Nets		
David Duke Jr.	August 8	Brooklyn Nets	Providence (Undrafted in 2021)	
Jay Huff	August 8	Washington Wizards	Virginia (Undrafted in 2021)	
David Nwaba	August 8	Houston Rockets		
Garrett Temple	August 8	New Orleans Pelicans	Chicago Bulls	
Sterling Brown	August 9	Dallas Mavericks	Houston Rockets	
Sam Dekker	August 9	Toronto Raptors	Türk Telekom (Turkey)	
Gorgui Dieng	August 9	Atlanta Hawks	San Antonio Spurs	
Blake Griffin	August 9	Brooklyn Nets		
Tim Hardaway Jr.	August 9	Dallas Mavericks		
Frank Kaminsky	August 9	Phoenix Suns		
Furkan Korkmaz	August 9	Philadelphia 76ers		
Boban Marjanović	August 9	Dallas Mavericks		
Nerlens Noel	August 9	New York Knicks		
Yves Pons	August 9	Memphis Grizzlies	Tennessee (Undrafted in 2021)	
Chaundee Brown	August 10	Los Angeles Lakers	Michigan (Undrafted in 2021)	
Alex Caruso	August 10	Chicago Bulls	Los Angeles Lakers	
Andre Iguodala**	August 10	Golden State Warriors	Miami Heat	
Frank Jackson (RFA)	August 10	Detroit Pistons (Previously on a two-way contract)		
Reggie Jackson	August 10	Los Angeles Clippers		
Cory Joseph	August 10	Detroit Pistons (Waived on July 31)		
Mac McClung	August 10	Los Angeles Lakers	Texas Tech (Undrafted in 2021)	
Rodney McGruder	August 10	Detroit Pistons (Waived on August 6)		
Patty Mills	August 10	Brooklyn Nets	San Antonio Spurs	
Elfrid Payton	August 10	Phoenix Suns	New York Knicks	
Tony Snell	August 10	Portland Trail Blazers	Atlanta Hawks	
Kemba Walker	August 10	New York Knicks	Oklahoma City Thunder (Waived on August 6)	
Will Barton	August 11	Denver Nuggets		
Isaac Bonga	August 11	Toronto Raptors	Washington Wizards	
Tony Bradley	August 11	Chicago Bulls	Oklahoma City Thunder	
Zach Collins	August 11	San Antonio Spurs	Portland Trail Blazers	
DeMar DeRozan	August 11	Chicago Bulls	San Antonio Spurs	
Javonte Green (RFA)	August 11	Chicago Bulls		
Jeff Green	August 11	Denver Nuggets	Brooklyn Nets	
Johnny Hamilton	August 11	Atlanta Hawks	Fenerbahçe Beko (Turkey)	
Mike Muscala	August 11	Oklahoma City Thunder		
Thanasis Antetokounmpo	August 12	Milwaukee Bucks		
Kawhi Leonard*	August 12	Los Angeles Clippers		
Nicolas Batum	August 13	Los Angeles Clippers		
Enes Kanter	August 13	Boston Celtics	Portland Trail Blazers	
Alex Len	August 13	Sacramento Kings	Washington Wizards	
Didi Louzada** (RFA)	August 13	New Orleans Pelicans		
Dennis Schröder	August 13	Boston Celtics	Los Angeles Lakers	
MaCio Teague	August 14	Utah Jazz	Baylor (Undrafted in 2021)	
Udonis Haslem	August 15	Miami Heat		
Evan Fournier	August 16	New York Knicks	Boston Celtics	
Willy Hernangómez	August 16	New Orleans Pelicans		
JaVale McGee	August 16	Phoenix Suns	Denver Nuggets	
Jamorko Pickett	August 16	Detroit Pistons	Georgetown (Undrafted in 2021)	
D. J. Stewart Jr.	August 16	Miami Heat	Mississippi State (Undrafted in 2021)	
Alec Burks	August 17	New York Knicks		
Taj Gibson	August 17	New York Knicks		
Derrick Rose	August 17	New York Knicks		
Dwayne Bacon	August 18	New York Knicks	Orlando Magic (Waived on August 8)	
Jordan Goodwin	August 18	Washington Wizards	Saint Louis (Undrafted in 2021)	
JaMychal Green*	August 18	Denver Nuggets		
Josh Hart (RFA)	August 18	New Orleans Pelicans		
Feron Hunt	August 18	Dallas Mavericks	Southern Methodist (Undrafted in 2021)	
Carlik Jones	August 18	Dallas Mavericks	Louisville (Undrafted in 2021)	
A. J. Lawson	August 18	Atlanta Hawks	South Carolina (Undrafted in 2021)	
EJ Onu	August 18	Dallas Mavericks	Shawnee State (Undrafted in 2021)	
Aamir Simms	August 18	New York Knicks	Clemson (Undrafted in 2021)	
Hamidou Diallo (RFA)	August 19	Detroit Pistons		
Jaime Echenique	August 19	Washington Wizards	Acunsa GBC (Spain)	
Jock Landale	August 19	San Antonio Spurs	Melbourne United (Australia)	
Torrey Craig	August 20	Indiana Pacers	Phoenix Suns	
M. J. Walker	August 20	New York Knicks	Florida State (Undrafted in 2021)	
Moritz Wagner	August 23	Orlando Magic		
Tyler Bey	August 24	Houston Rockets	Dallas Mavericks (Previously on a two-way contract)	
Daishen Nix	August 24	Houston Rockets	NBA G League Ignite (NBA G League)	
Bryn Forbes*	August 25	San Antonio Spurs	Milwaukee Bucks	
Armoni Brooks (RFA)	August 26	Houston Rockets (Previously on a two-way contract)		
Lauri Markkanen	August 28	Cleveland Cavaliers	Chicago Bulls	
Sviatoslav Mykhailiuk	August 31	Toronto Raptors	Oklahoma City Thunder	
Austin Rivers	August 31	Denver Nuggets		
Rajon Rondo	August 31	Los Angeles Lakers	Memphis Grizzlies (Waived on August 28)	
Dennis Smith Jr.	September 1	Portland Trail Blazers	Detroit Pistons	
George King	September 2	Los Angeles Clippers	Chemnitz 99 (Germany)	
LaMarcus Aldridge	September 3	Brooklyn Nets (Came out of retirement)		
Marquese Chriss	September 3	Portland Trail Blazers	San Antonio Spurs (Waived on March 28)	
Matt Thomas	September 4	Chicago Bulls	Utah Jazz (Waived on August 1)	
Alize Johnson	September 6	Chicago Bulls	Brooklyn Nets (Waived on September 3)	
Stanley Johnson	September 6	Chicago Bulls	Toronto Raptors	
Trevon Scott	September 6	Cleveland Cavaliers	Salt Lake City Stars (NBA G League)	
Ethan Thompson	September 6	Chicago Bulls	Oregon (Undrafted in 2021)	
Keita Bates-Diop (RFA)	September 7	San Antonio Spurs (Previously on a two-way contract)		
Tyler Cook	September 7	Chicago Bulls	Detroit Pistons (Waived on July 31)	
Jeff Dowtin	September 7	Orlando Magic	Lakeland Magic (NBA G League)	
Harry Giles	September 7	Los Angeles Clippers	Portland Trail Blazers	
Hassani Gravett	September 7	Orlando Magic	MZT Skopje Aerodrom (North Macedonia)	
Nate Hinton	September 7	Indiana Pacers	Dallas Mavericks (Waived on August 27; previously on a two-way contract)	
Jon Teske	September 7	Orlando Magic	Filou Oostende (Belgium)	
Tremont Waters	September 7	Milwaukee Bucks	Boston Celtics (Previously on a two-way contract)	
Moses Wright	September 7	Los Angeles Clippers	Georgia Tech (Undrafted in 2021)	
Mitch Ballock	September 8	Cleveland Cavaliers	Creighton (Undrafted in 2021)	
Tacko Fall	September 8	Cleveland Cavaliers	Boston Celtics (Previously on a two-way contract)	
RJ Nembhard	September 8	Cleveland Cavaliers	TCU (Undrafted in 2021)	
Emanuel Terry	September 8	Sacramento Kings	Agua Caliente Clippers (NBA G League)	
DeAndre Jordan	September 9	Los Angeles Lakers	Detroit Pistons (Waived on September 6)	
Timothé Luwawu-Cabarrot	September 9	Atlanta Hawks	Brooklyn Nets	
E'Twaun Moore	September 9	Orlando Magic	Phoenix Suns	
Patrick Patterson	September 9	Portland Trail Blazers	Los Angeles Clippers	
Paul Millsap	September 10	Brooklyn Nets	Denver Nuggets	
Micah Potter	September 10	Miami Heat	Wisconsin (Undrafted in 2021)	
Javonte Smart	September 10	Miami Heat	LSU (Undrafted in 2021)	
Dru Smith	September 10	Miami Heat	Missouri (Undrafted in 2021)	
Derrick Alston Jr.	September 13	Utah Jazz	Boise State (Undrafted in 2021)	
Isaiah Hartenstein*	September 13	Los Angeles Clippers	Cleveland Cavaliers	
Jordan McLaughlin (RFA)	September 14	Minnesota Timberwolves		
Juwan Morgan	September 14	Boston Celtics	Utah Jazz	
Jarred Vanderbilt (RFA)	September 15	Minnesota Timberwolves		
Frank Ntilikina	September 16	Dallas Mavericks	New York Knicks	
Anthony Tarke	September 16	Detroit Pistons	Coppin State (Undrafted in 2021)	
Dante Exum	September 17	Houston Rockets		
Kevin Pangos	September 17	Cleveland Cavaliers	Zenit Saint Petersburg (Russia)	
Jordan Schakel	September 18	Washington Wizards	San Diego State (Undrafted in 2021)	
Brian Bowen	September 20	Minnesota Timberwolves	Indiana Pacers (Waived on April 23; previously on a two-way contract)	
Devontae Cacok	September 20	Brooklyn Nets	Los Angeles Lakers (Previously on a two-way contract)	
Matt Lewis	September 20	Minnesota Timberwolves	James Madison (Undrafted in 2021)	
Isaiah Miller	September 20	Minnesota Timberwolves	UNC Greensboro (Undrafted in 2021)	
Chris Silva	September 20	Minnesota Timberwolves	Sacramento Kings (Waived on April 28)	
Xavier Sneed	September 20	Charlotte Hornets	Niagara River Lions (Canada)	
Quinn Cook	September 21	Portland Trail Blazers	Cleveland Cavaliers (Last 10-day contract ended April 1)	
Jahlil Okafor	September 21	Atlanta Hawks	Brooklyn Nets (Waived on September 9)	
Reggie Perry	September 21	Toronto Raptors	Brooklyn Nets (Previously on a two-way contract)	
Admiral Schofield	September 21	Orlando Magic	Greensboro Swarm (NBA G League)	
Jordan Ford	September 22	Los Angeles Clippers	Peristeri (Greece)	
Chasson Randle	September 22	Phoenix Suns	Orlando Magic (Previously on a two-way contract)	
Denzel Valentine	September 22	Cleveland Cavaliers	Chicago Bulls	
Tarik Black	September 23	Denver Nuggets	Zenit Saint Petersburg (Russia)	
Shaq Buchanan	September 23	Memphis Grizzlies	Memphis Hustle (NBA G League)	
Zylan Cheatham	September 23	New Orleans Pelicans	Iowa Wolves (NBA G League)	
Matt Coleman III	September 23	Sacramento Kings	Texas (Undrafted in 2021)	
Javin DeLaurier	September 23	Milwaukee Bucks	Niagara River Lions (Canada)	
Jared Harper	September 23	New Orleans Pelicans	New York Knicks (Previously on a two-way contract)	
Sean McDermott	September 23	Memphis Grizzlies (Waived on August 25; previously on a two-way contract)		
Theo Pinson	September 23	Boston Celtics	New York Knicks (Previously on a two-way contract)	
Wayne Selden Jr.	September 23	New York Knicks	Ironi Ness Ziona (Israel)	
Luka Garza	September 24	Detroit Pistons (Previously on a two-way contract)		
Langston Galloway	September 25	Golden State Warriors	Phoenix Suns	
Kyle Guy	September 25	Cleveland Cavaliers	Sacramento Kings (Previously on a two-way contract)	
D. J. Steward	September 25	Sacramento Kings	Duke (Undrafted in 2021)	
Jordan Bell	September 26	Golden State Warriors (Previously on a two-way contract)		
Avery Bradley**	September 26	Golden State Warriors	Houston Rockets	
Mamadi Diakite	September 26	Oklahoma City Thunder (Claimed off waivers)	Milwaukee Bucks (Waived on September 24)	
Rob Edwards	September 26	Oklahoma City Thunder	Oklahoma City Blue (NBA G League)	
Daniel Oturu	September 26	Chicago Bulls	Memphis Grizzlies (Waived on September 23)	
D. J. Wilson	September 26	Oklahoma City Thunder	Houston Rockets	
Ryan Arcidiacono**	September 27	Boston Celtics	Chicago Bulls	
Shaquille Harrison	September 27	Philadelphia 76ers	Denver Nuggets (Previously on a two-way contract)	
Garrison Mathews	September 27	Boston Celtics	Washington Wizards (Previously on a two-way contract)	
Austin Reaves	September 27	Los Angeles Lakers (Previously on a two-way contract)		
Davon Reed	September 27	Denver Nuggets	Taoyuan Pilots (Taiwan)	
Matt Ryan	September 27	Denver Nuggets	Chattanooga (Undrafted in 2020)	
Deividas Sirvydis	September 27	Detroit Pistons (Waived on July 31)		
Cassius Stanley	September 27	Detroit Pistons	Indiana Pacers (Previously on a two-way contract)	
Derrick Walton	September 27	Detroit Pistons	LDLC ASVEL (France)	
Marques Bolden	September 28	Utah Jazz	Canton Charge (NBA G League)	
Malik Fitts	September 28	Utah Jazz	Los Angeles Clippers (Last 10-day contract ended April 19)	
Johnny O'Bryant III	September 28	Milwaukee Bucks	Türk Telekom (Turkey)	
Cameron Oliver	September 28	Los Angeles Lakers	Cairns Taipans (Australia)	
Elijah Bryant	September 29	Milwaukee Bucks (Waived on September 26)		
Jared Cunningham	September 29	Detroit Pistons	Bnei Rav-Bariach Herzliya (Israel)	
Haywood Highsmith	September 29	Philadelphia 76ers	Vanoli Cremona (Italy)	
Trevelin Queen	September 29	Los Angeles Lakers	Rio Grande Valley Vipers (NBA G League)	
Aric Holman	October 1	San Antonio Spurs	ratiopharm Ulm (Germany)	
Nate Renfro	October 1	San Antonio Spurs	Austin Spurs (NBA G League)	
Brad Wanamaker	October 6	Indiana Pacers	Charlotte Hornets	
DaQuan Jeffries	October 7	Atlanta Hawks	San Antonio Spurs	
Denzel Mahoney	October 7	San Antonio Spurs	Creighton (Undrafted in 2021)	
Jaylen Morris	October 7	San Antonio Spurs	Austin Spurs (NBA G League)	
Jeremiah Tilmon	October 7	Orlando Magic	Missouri (Undrafted in 2021)	
Jalen Crutcher	October 8	Charlotte Hornets	Dayton (Undrafted in 2021)	
Tyler Hall	October 8	New York Knicks	Westchester Knicks (NBA G League)	
Cameron McGriff	October 8	Charlotte Hornets	Okapi Aalst (Belgium)	
Romeo Weems	October 8	Memphis Grizzlies	DePaul (Undrafted in 2021)	
James Banks III	October 9	New Orleans Pelicans	Hapoel Be'er Sheva (Israel)	
Malcolm Hill	October 9	New Orleans Pelicans	Hapoel Bank Yahav Jerusalem (Israel)	
Giorgi Bezhanishvili	October 10	Denver Nuggets	Illinois (Undrafted in 2021)	
Bryce Brown	October 10	Brooklyn Nets	Westchester Knicks (NBA G League)	
Josh Gray	October 10	Brooklyn Nets	Fort Wayne Mad Ants (NBA G League)	
Quinndary Weatherspoon	October 10	Golden State Warriors	San Antonio Spurs (Previously on a two-way contract)	
Jordan Bowden	October 11	Brooklyn Nets	Long Island Nets (NBA G League)	
Jaylen Hoard	October 11	Oklahoma City Thunder (Previously on a two-way contract)		
Jemerrio Jones	October 11	Milwaukee Bucks	Delaware Blue Coats (NBA G League)	
Brandon Rachal	October 11	Brooklyn Nets	Tulsa (Undrafted in 2021)	
Bryce Alford	October 12	Chicago Bulls	Benfica (Portugal)	
Jared Brownridge	October 12	Philadelphia 76ers	Delaware Blue Coats (NBA G League)	
Jordan Burns	October 12	San Antonio Spurs	Colgate (Undrafted in 2021)	
Devin Cannady	October 12	Orlando Magic (Waived on May 4; previously on a two-way contract)		
Damyean Dotson	October 12	San Antonio Spurs	Cleveland Cavaliers (Waived on September 10)	
Melvin Frazier	October 12	Oklahoma City Thunder	Oklahoma City Blue (NBA G League)	
Justin James	October 12	Cleveland Cavaliers	Utah Jazz (Waived on October 1; previously on a two-way contract)	
Damien Jefferson	October 12	Sacramento Kings	Creighton (Undrafted in 2021)	
Braxton Key	October 12	Philadelphia 76ers	Delaware Blue Coats (NBA G League)	
Ade Murkey	October 12	Sacramento Kings	Iowa Wolves (NBA G League)	
Myles Powell	October 12	New York Knicks (Waived on April 24; previously on a two-way contract)		
Rayjon Tucker	October 12	Milwaukee Bucks	Philadelphia 76ers (Waived on August 18; previously on a two-way contract)	
Ibi Watson	October 12	Atlanta Hawks	Dayton (Undrafted in 2021)	
Alex Antetokounmpo	October 13	Toronto Raptors	UCAM Murcia (Spain)	
Ed Davis	October 13	Cleveland Cavaliers	Minnesota Timberwolves	
L. J. Figueroa	October 13	Golden State Warriors	Leones de Santo Domingo (Dominican Republic)	
Marcus Foster	October 13	Houston Rockets	Türk Telekom B.K. (Turkey)	
Josh Hall	October 13	Toronto Raptors	Oklahoma City Thunder (Waived on September 12; previously on a two-way contract)	
Scotty Hopson	October 13	Oklahoma City Thunder	Melbourne United (Australia)	
Jalen Lecque	October 13	Milwaukee Bucks	Indiana Pacers (Waived on March 25)	
Frank Mason III	October 13	Los Angeles Lakers	Delaware Blue Coats (NBA G League)	
John Petty Jr.	October 13	New Orleans Pelicans	Alabama (Undrafted in 2021)	
Devontae Shuler	October 13	Washington Wizards	Ole Miss (Undrafted in 2021)	
LiAngelo Ball	October 14	Charlotte Hornets	Detroit Pistons (Waived on December 13, 2020)	
Armoni Brooks	October 14	Houston Rockets		
Ahmad Caver	October 14	Memphis Grizzlies	Memphis Hustle (NBA G League)	
Brandon Goodwin	October 14	New York Knicks	Atlanta Hawks	
Matthew Hurt	October 14	Memphis Grizzlies	Houston Rockets (Waived on September 24; previously on a two-way contract)	
Nino Johnson	October 14	Utah Jazz	Hamilton Honey Badgers (Canada)	
Zavier Simpson	October 14	Oklahoma City Thunder	Oklahoma City Blue (NBA G League)	
Justin Anderson	October 15	Indiana Pacers	Philadelphia 76ers (Waived on December 19, 2020)	
Troy Baxter Jr.	October 15	Chicago Bulls	Morgan State (Undrafted in 2021)	
Bennie Boatwright	October 15	Indiana Pacers	Memphis Hustle (NBA G League)	
Chris Clemons	October 15	Boston Celtics	Houston Rockets (Waived on January 21)	
Derek Culver	October 15	Indiana Pacers	West Virginia (Undrafted in 2021)	
Nate Darling	October 15	Los Angeles Clippers	Charlotte Hornets (Previously on a two-way contract)	
Vincent Edwards	October 15	Minnesota Timberwolves	Oklahoma City Blue (NBA G League)	
Ashton Hagans	October 15	Toronto Raptors	Minnesota Timberwolves (Waived on February 13; previously on a two-way contract)	
Justin Jackson	October 15	Dallas Mavericks	Milwaukee Bucks (Previously on a two-way contract)	
Justin Jaworski	October 15	Oklahoma City Thunder	Lafayette (Undrafted in 2021)	
B. J. Johnson	October 15	Orlando Magic	Brisbane Bullets (Australia)	
Brandon Knight	October 15	New York Knicks	Detroit Pistons	
Luke Kornet	October 15	Boston Celtics		
EJ Onu	October 15	Dallas Mavericks (Waived on September 3)		
Olivier Sarr	October 15	Oklahoma City Thunder	Kentucky (Undrafted in 2021)	
Nik Stauskas	October 15	Denver Nuggets	Raptors 905 (NBA G League)	
David Stockton	October 15	Memphis Grizzlies	Mets de Guaynabo (Puerto Rico)	
Axel Toupane	October 15	Golden State Warriors	Milwaukee Bucks (Previously on a two-way contract)	
Breein Tyree	October 15	Toronto Raptors	Raptors 905 (NBA G League)	
Christian Vital	October 15	Houston Rockets	Memphis Hustle (NBA G League)	
Wenyen Gabriel	October 16	Milwaukee Bucks	New Orleans Pelicans (Waived on October 12)	
Mfiondu Kabengele	October 17	Houston Rockets	Cleveland Cavaliers (Waived on October 12)	
Avery Bradley	October 18	Los Angeles Lakers (Claimed off waivers)	Golden State Warriors (Waived on October 15)	
Devontae Cacok	October 18	San Antonio Spurs (Claimed off waivers)	Brooklyn Nets (Waived on October 16)	
Jeff Dowtin	October 18	Golden State Warriors (Claimed off waivers)	Orlando Magic (Waived on October 16)	
Garrison Mathews	October 18	Houston Rockets (Claimed off waivers)	Boston Celtics (Waived on October 16)	
Jabari Parker	October 19	Boston Celtics (Waived on October 17)		
Gary Payton II	October 19	Golden State Warriors (Waived on October 15)		
DeMarcus Cousins	November 30	Milwaukee Bucks	Los Angeles Clippers	
Gary Clark	December 3	New Orleans Pelicans	Capitanes de la Ciudad de México (NBA G League)	
Wesley Matthews	December 3	Milwaukee Bucks	Los Angeles Lakers	
Davon Reed	December 4	Denver Nuggets	Grand Rapids Gold (NBA G League)	
Stanley Johnson	December 8	Chicago Bulls	South Bay Lakers (NBA G League)	
Alfonzo McKinnie	December 10	Chicago Bulls	Capitanes de la Ciudad de México (NBA G League)	
Langston Galloway	December 16	Brooklyn Nets	College Park Skyhawks (NBA G League)	
Aleem Ford	December 17	Orlando Magic	Lakeland Magic (NBA G League)	
Hassani Gravett	December 17	Orlando Magic	Lakeland Magic (NBA G League)	
B. J. Johnson	December 17	Orlando Magic	Lakeland Magic (NBA G League)	
Justin Robinson	December 17	Sacramento Kings	Milwaukee Bucks (Waived on November 29; previously on a two-way contract)	
Admiral Schofield	December 17	Orlando Magic	Lakeland Magic (NBA G League)	
Isaiah Thomas	December 17	Los Angeles Lakers	Grand Rapids Gold (NBA G League)	
James Ennis III	December 18	Brooklyn Nets	Orlando Magic	
Tyler Hall	December 18	New York Knicks	Westchester Knicks (NBA G League)	
Shaquille Harrison	December 18	Brooklyn Nets	Delaware Blue Coats (NBA G League)	
Justin Jackson	December 18	Boston Celtics	Texas Legends (NBA G League)	
Garrison Mathews	December 18	Houston Rockets (Previously on a two-way contract)		
Davon Reed	December 19	Denver Nuggets (Second 10-day contract)	Grand Rapids Gold (NBA G League)	
Alfonzo McKinnie	December 20	Chicago Bulls (Second 10-day contract)		
C. J. Miles	December 20	Boston Celtics	NBA G League Ignite (NBA G League)	
Theo Pinson	December 20	Dallas Mavericks	Maine Celtics (NBA G League)	
Justin Anderson	December 21	Cleveland Cavaliers	Fort Wayne Mad Ants (NBA G League)	
Marquese Chriss	December 21	Dallas Mavericks	Portland Trail Blazers (Waived on October 16)	
Damyean Dotson	December 21	New York Knicks	Austin Spurs (NBA G League)	
Tim Frazier	December 21	Orlando Magic	Memphis Grizzlies	
Wenyen Gabriel	December 21	Brooklyn Nets	Wisconsin Herd (NBA G League)	
Freddie Gillespie	December 21	Orlando Magic	Memphis Hustle (NBA G League)	
Jemerrio Jones	December 21	Los Angeles Lakers	Wisconsin Herd (NBA G League)	
Luke Kornet	December 21	Cleveland Cavaliers	Maine Celtics (NBA G League)	
Matt Mooney	December 21	New York Knicks	Capitanes de la Ciudad de México (NBA G League)	
Chris Silva	December 21	Minnesota Timberwolves	Iowa Wolves (NBA G League)	
Rayjon Tucker	December 21	Minnesota Timberwolves	Wisconsin Herd (NBA G League)	
Moses Wright	December 21	Los Angeles Clippers	Agua Caliente Clippers (NBA G League)	
Zylan Cheatham	December 22	Miami Heat	Birmingham Squadron (NBA G League)	
Malcolm Hill	December 22	Atlanta Hawks	Birmingham Squadron (NBA G League)	
Ersan İlyasova	December 22	Chicago Bulls	Utah Jazz	
Joe Johnson	December 22	Boston Celtics	Triplets (Big3)	
Tyler Johnson	December 22	Philadelphia 76ers	Brooklyn Nets	
George King	December 22	Dallas Mavericks	Agua Caliente Clippers (NBA G League)	
Mac McClung	December 22	Chicago Bulls	South Bay Lakers (NBA G League)	
Juwan Morgan	December 22	Toronto Raptors	Maine Celtics (NBA G League)	
Emmanuel Mudiay	December 22	Sacramento Kings	Žalgiris Kaunas (Lithuania)	
Ade Murkey	December 22	Sacramento Kings	Stockton Kings (NBA G League)	
Jordan Schakel	December 22	Washington Wizards	Capital City Go-Go (NBA G League)	
Trevon Scott	December 22	Cleveland Cavaliers	Cleveland Charge (NBA G League)	
Lance Stephenson	December 22	Atlanta Hawks	Grand Rapids Gold (NBA G League)	
Tremont Waters	December 22	Toronto Raptors	Wisconsin Herd (NBA G League)	
D. J. Wilson	December 22	Toronto Raptors	Oklahoma City Blue (NBA G League)	
Charlie Brown Jr.	December 23	Dallas Mavericks	Delaware Blue Coats (NBA G League)	
Javin DeLaurier	December 23	Milwaukee Bucks	Wisconsin Herd (NBA G League)	
Cheick Diallo	December 23	Detroit Pistons	Motor City Cruise (NBA G League)	
Danuel House	December 23	New York Knicks	Houston Rockets (Waived on December 18)	
Wes Iwundu	December 23	Atlanta Hawks	Charlotte Hornets (Waived on October 18)	
Carlik Jones	December 23	Dallas Mavericks	Texas Legends (NBA G League)	
Brandon Knight	December 23	Dallas Mavericks	Sioux Falls Skyforce (NBA G League)	
Quinndary Weatherspoon	December 23	Golden State Warriors	Santa Cruz Warriors (NBA G League)	
Darren Collison	December 24	Los Angeles Lakers	Indiana Pacers (Came out of retirement)	
Stanley Johnson	December 24	Los Angeles Lakers	Chicago Bulls (10-day contract expired on December 19)	
Daniel Oturu	December 24	Toronto Raptors	Windy City Bulls (NBA G League)	
Al-Farouq Aminu	December 25	Boston Celtics	San Antonio Spurs (Waived on October 18)	
Anthony Barber	December 25	Atlanta Hawks	College Park Skyhawks (NBA G League)	
Shaq Buchanan	December 25	Memphis Grizzlies	Memphis Hustle (NBA G League)	
Malik Ellison	December 25	Atlanta Hawks	College Park Skyhawks (NBA G League)	
Xavier Moon	December 25	Los Angeles Clippers	Agua Caliente Clippers (NBA G League)	
Norvel Pelle	December 25	Boston Celtics	Cleveland Charge (NBA G League)	
Cassius Stanley	December 25	Detroit Pistons	Motor City Cruise (NBA G League)	
Tyrell Terry	December 25	Memphis Grizzlies	Dallas Mavericks (Waived on October 15)	
Derrick Walton	December 25	Detroit Pistons	Motor City Cruise (NBA G League)	
Jarron Cumberland	December 26	Portland Trail Blazers	Delaware Blue Coats (NBA G League)	
Justin James	December 26	New Orleans Pelicans	Cleveland Charge (NBA G League)	
Cameron McGriff	December 26	Portland Trail Blazers	Greensboro Swarm (NBA G League)	
Alfonzo McKinnie	December 26	Chicago Bulls (Signed for rest of season)		
Deividas Sirvydis	December 26	Detroit Pistons	Motor City Cruise (NBA G League)	
Anthony Tolliver	December 26	New Orleans Pelicans	Philadelphia 76ers (Waived on August 27)	
Brandon Williams	December 26	Portland Trail Blazers	Westchester Knicks (NBA G League)	
Chaundee Brown	December 27	Atlanta Hawks	Los Angeles Lakers (Waived on December 21; previously on a two-way contract)	
Rob Edwards	December 27	Oklahoma City Thunder	Oklahoma City Blue (NBA G League)	
Langston Galloway	December 27	Brooklyn Nets (Second 10-day contract; last 10-day contract ended December 25)		
Jordan Goodwin	December 27	Washington Wizards	Capital City Go-Go (NBA G League)	
Hassani Gravett	December 27	Orlando Magic (Second 10-day contract)		
Scotty Hopson	December 27	Oklahoma City Thunder	Oklahoma City Blue (NBA G League)	
Greg Monroe	December 27	Minnesota Timberwolves	Capital City Go-Go (NBA G League)	
Olivier Sarr	December 27	Oklahoma City Thunder	Oklahoma City Blue (NBA G League)	
Admiral Schofield	December 27	Orlando Magic (Second 10-day contract)		
Xavier Sneed	December 27	Memphis Grizzlies	Greensboro Swarm (NBA G League)	
Keifer Sykes	December 27	Indiana Pacers (Signed for rest of season)	Fort Wayne Mad Ants (NBA G League)	
Emanuel Terry	December 27	Phoenix Suns	Stockton Kings (NBA G League)	
Feron Hunt	December 28	New Orleans Pelicans	Texas Legends (NBA G League)	
DeJon Jarreau	December 28	Houston Rockets	Texas Legends (NBA G League)	
Alize Johnson	December 28	Washington Wizards	Chicago Bulls (Waived on December 26)	
Trayvon Palmer	December 28	Detroit Pistons	Motor City Cruise (NBA G League)	
Reggie Perry	December 28	Portland Trail Blazers	Raptors 905 (NBA G League)	
Justin Robinson	December 28	Detroit Pistons	Sacramento Kings (Last 10-day contract ended December 26)	
Craig Sword	December 28	Washington Wizards	Capital City Go-Go (NBA G League)	
Justin Tillman	December 28	Atlanta Hawks	College Park Skyhawks (NBA G League)	
Chris Clemons	December 29	Atlanta Hawks	Maine Celtics (NBA G League)	
James Ennis III	December 29	Los Angeles Clippers	Brooklyn Nets (10-day contract ended December 27)	
Shaquille Harrison	December 29	Brooklyn Nets (Last 10-day contract ended December 28)		
Jaylen Hoard	December 29	Oklahoma City Thunder	Oklahoma City Blue (NBA G League)	
Malik Newman	December 29	Cleveland Cavaliers	Cleveland Charge (NBA G League)	
Cameron Oliver	December 29	Atlanta Hawks	South Bay Lakers (NBA G League)	
Micah Potter	December 29	Detroit Pistons	Sioux Falls Skyforce (NBA G League)	
Isaiah Thomas	December 29	Dallas Mavericks	Los Angeles Lakers (10-day contract ended December 26)	
Brad Wanamaker	December 29	Washington Wizards	Indiana Pacers (Waived on December 27)	
Jordan Bell	December 30	Chicago Bulls	Santa Cruz Warriors (NBA G League)	
Jaime Echenique	December 30	Washington Wizards	Capital City Go-Go (NBA G League)	
Kyle Guy	December 30	Miami Heat	Cleveland Charge (NBA G League)	
Haywood Highsmith	December 30	Miami Heat	Delaware Blue Coats (NBA G League)	
Nate Hinton	December 30	Indiana Pacers	Fort Wayne Mad Ants (NBA G League)	
Aric Holman	December 30	Miami Heat	Austin Spurs (NBA G League)	
Dakota Mathias	December 30	Memphis Grizzlies	Philadelphia 76ers (Waived on January 18; previously on a two-way contract)	
Davon Reed	December 30	Denver Nuggets (Third 10-day contract)		
M. J. Walker	December 30	Phoenix Suns	Westchester Knicks (NBA G League)	
Paris Bass	December 31	Phoenix Suns	South Bay Lakers (NBA G League)	
Ahmad Caver	December 31	Indiana Pacers	Memphis Hustle (NBA G League)	
Mario Chalmers	December 31	Miami Heat	Grand Rapids Gold (NBA G League)	
Marquese Chriss	December 31	Dallas Mavericks (Second 10-day contract)		
Damyean Dotson	December 31	New York Knicks (Second 10-day contract)		
Tim Frazier	December 31	Orlando Magic (Second 10-day contract)		
Wenyen Gabriel	December 31	Los Angeles Clippers	Brooklyn Nets (Last 10-day contract ended December 30)	
Freddie Gillespie	December 31	Orlando Magic (Second 10-day contract)		
Brandon Goodwin	December 31	Cleveland Cavaliers	Westchester Knicks (NBA G League)	
Matt Mooney	December 31	New York Knicks (Second 10-day contract)		
Jaysean Paige	December 31	Detroit Pistons	Maine Celtics (NBA G League)	
Theo Pinson	December 31	Dallas Mavericks (Second 10-day contract)		
Chris Silva	December 31	Miami Heat	Minnesota Timberwolves (Last 10-day contract ended December 30)	
Nik Stauskas	December 31	Miami Heat	Grand Rapids Gold (NBA G League)	
Rayjon Tucker	December 31	Denver Nuggets	Minnesota Timberwolves (10-day contract ended December 30)	
Justin Anderson	January 1	Indiana Pacers	Cleveland Cavaliers (10-day contract ended January 1)	
Bismack Biyombo	January 1	Phoenix Suns	Charlotte Hornets	
DaQuan Jeffries	January 1	Memphis Grizzlies	College Park Skyhawks (NBA G League)	
Carlik Jones	January 1	Denver Nuggets	Dallas Mavericks (10-day contract ended December 31)	
Mac McClung	January 1	Chicago Bulls (Second 10-day contract)		
Jaylen Morris	January 1	San Antonio Spurs	Austin Spurs (NBA G League)	
Lance Stephenson	January 1	Indiana Pacers	Atlanta Hawks (10-day contract ended January 1)	
Killian Tillie	January 1	Memphis Grizzlies (Previously on a two-way contract)		
Tremont Waters	January 1	Washington Wizards	Toronto Raptors (10-day contract ended December 31)	
Charlie Brown Jr.	January 3	Philadelphia 76ers	Delaware Blue Coats (NBA G League)	
Luke Kornet	January 3	Milwaukee Bucks	Cleveland Cavaliers (10-day contract ended December 30)	
Jon Teske	January 3	Memphis Grizzlies	Lakeland Magic (NBA G League)	
Justin Jackson	January 4	Phoenix Suns	Texas Legends (NBA G League)	
Xavier Moon	January 4	Los Angeles Clippers (Second 10-day contract)		
Braxton Key	January 5	Philadelphia 76ers	Delaware Blue Coats (NBA G League)	
Ryan Arcidiacono	January 6	New York Knicks	Maine Celtics (NBA G League)	
Danuel House	January 6	Utah Jazz	New York Knicks (Last 10-day contract ended January 1)	
Stanley Johnson	January 6	Los Angeles Lakers (Second 10-day contract; last 10-day contract ended January 3)		
Tyler Johnson	January 6	San Antonio Spurs	Philadelphia 76ers (Last 10-day contract ended December 31)	
Anthony Lamb	January 6	San Antonio Spurs	Rio Grande Valley Vipers (NBA G League)	
Greg Monroe	January 6	Washington Wizards	Minnesota Timberwolves (Last 10-day contract ended January 5)	
Jeff Dowtin	January 7	Milwaukee Bucks	Golden State Warriors (Waived on January 2; previously on a two-way contract)	
Langston Galloway	January 7	Milwaukee Bucks	Brooklyn Nets (Last 10-day contract ended January 5)	
Norvel Pelle	January 7	Utah Jazz	Boston Celtics (Last 10-day contract ended January 3)	
D. J. Wilson	January 7	Toronto Raptors (Second 10-day contract; last 10-day contract ended December 31)		
Cassius Stanley	January 8	Detroit Pistons (Second 10-day contract)	Motor City Cruise (NBA G League)	
Olivier Sarr	January 9	Oklahoma City Thunder (Second 10-day contract)	Oklahoma City Blue (NBA G League)	
Marquese Chriss	January 10	Dallas Mavericks (Third 10-day contract)		
James Ennis III	January 10	Denver Nuggets	Los Angeles Clippers (Last 10-day contract ended January 7)	
Kyle Guy	January 10	Miami Heat (Second 10-day contract; last 10-day contract ended January 8)		
Chris Silva	January 10	Miami Heat (Second 10-day contract; last 10-day contract ended January 9)		
Denzel Valentine	January 10	Utah Jazz	New York Knicks (Waived on January 4)	
Bismack Biyombo	January 11	Phoenix Suns (Signed for rest of season)		
Mamadi Diakite	January 11	Oklahoma City Thunder (10-day contract; previously waived on October 16)		
Wenyen Gabriel	January 11	Los Angeles Clippers (Second 10-day contract)		
Lance Stephenson	January 11	Indiana Pacers (Second 10-day contract)		
Paris Bass	January 12	Phoenix Suns (Second 10-day contract; last 10-day contract ended January 9)		
Zylan Cheatham	January 12	Utah Jazz	Birmingham Squadron (NBA G League)	
Malcolm Hill	January 14	Chicago Bulls	Atlanta Hawks (Last 10-day contract ended December 31)	
Dakota Mathias	January 14	Memphis Grizzlies (Second 10-day contract)	Texas Legends (NBA G League)	
Xavier Moon	January 14	Los Angeles Clippers (Third 10-day contract)		
Lance Stephenson	January 14	Indiana Pacers (Third 10-day contract)		
Marquese Chriss	January 15	Dallas Mavericks (Signed to multi-year contract)		
Stanley Johnson	January 17	Los Angeles Lakers (Third 10-day contract; last 10-day contract ended January 15)		
Danuel House	January 18	Utah Jazz (Second 10-day contract; last 10-day contract ended January 15)		
Ryan Arcidiacono	January 19	New York Knicks (Second 10-day contract; previously waived on January 13)		
Shaquille Harrison	January 19	Memphis Grizzlies	Delaware Blue Coats (NBA G League)	
DeMarcus Cousins	January 21	Denver Nuggets	Milwaukee Bucks (Waived on January 6)	
Mamadi Diakite	January 21	Oklahoma City Thunder (Second 10-day contract)		
Chris Silva	January 21	Miami Heat (Third 10-day contract)		
Cassius Stanley	January 21	Detroit Pistons (Third 10-day contract)	Motor City Cruise (NBA G League)	
Lance Stephenson	January 24	Indiana Pacers (Fourth 10-day contract)		
Stanley Johnson	January 27	Los Angeles Lakers (Signed to multi-year contract)		
Danuel House	January 28	Utah Jazz (Third 10-day contract)		
Wenyen Gabriel	January 29	New Orleans Pelicans	Wisconsin Herd (NBA G League)	
DeMarcus Cousins	January 29	Denver Nuggets (Second 10-day contract; previously waived on January 29)		
Mamadi Diakite	January 31	Oklahoma City Thunder (Third 10-day contract)		
Chris Silva	January 31	Miami Heat (Fourth 10-day contract)		
Justin Jackson	February 2	Phoenix Suns (Second 10-day contract)	Texas Legends (NBA G League)	
Zylan Cheatham	February 3	New Orleans Pelicans	Birmingham Squadron (NBA G League)	
Miye Oni	February 3	New Orleans Pelicans	Oklahoma City Thunder (Waived on January 7)	
Lance Stephenson	February 3	Indiana Pacers (Signed for rest of season)		
Reggie Perry	February 4	Indiana Pacers	Raptors 905 (NBA G League)	
Greg Monroe	February 5	Milwaukee Bucks	Capital City Go-Go (NBA G League)	
DeMarcus Cousins	February 10	Denver Nuggets (Third 10-day contract)		
Sam Hauser	February 11	Boston Celtics (Previously on a two-way contract)		
Danuel House	February 11	Utah Jazz (Signed for rest of season)		
Luke Kornet	February 11	Boston Celtics (Signed for rest of season)	Maine Celtics (NBA G League)	
Aaron Wiggins	February 12	Oklahoma City Thunder (Previously on a two-way contract)		
Ryan Arcidiacono	February 13	New York Knicks (Signed for rest of season)	Maine Celtics (NBA G League)	
Haywood Highsmith	February 15	Miami Heat (Second 10-day contract)	Delaware Blue Coats (NBA G League)	
Caleb Martin	February 15	Miami Heat (Previously on a two-way contract)		
Daishen Nix	February 15	Houston Rockets (Previously on a two-way contract)		
DeAndre' Bembry	February 16	Milwaukee Bucks (Signed for rest of season)	Brooklyn Nets (Waived on February 10)	
Tristan Thompson	February 19	Chicago Bulls (Signed for rest of season)	Indiana Pacers (Waived on February 17)	
Trendon Watford	February 21	Portland Trail Blazers (Previously on a two-way contract)		
Goran Dragić	February 22	Brooklyn Nets (Signed for rest of season)	San Antonio Spurs (Waived on February 15)	
Drew Eubanks	February 22	Portland Trail Blazers	Toronto Raptors (Waived on February 10)	
Malik Fitts	February 23	Boston Celtics	Utah Jazz (Waived on January 13)	
Kelan Martin	February 23	Boston Celtics	Indiana Pacers (Waived on January 6)	
Jevon Carter	February 24	Milwaukee Bucks (Signed for rest of season)	Brooklyn Nets (Waived on February 22)	
Willie Cauley-Stein	February 24	Philadelphia 76ers	Dallas Mavericks (Waived on January 15)	
DeMarcus Cousins	February 25	Denver Nuggets (Signed for rest of season)		
Tim Frazier	February 26	Cleveland Cavaliers	Orlando Magic (Last 10-day contract ended January 9)	
Haywood Highsmith	February 26	Miami Heat (Third 10-day contract)		
Tomáš Satoranský	February 28	Washington Wizards (Signed for rest of season)	San Antonio Spurs (Waived on February 26)	
D. J. Wilson	February 28	Toronto Raptors (Third 10-day contract)	Oklahoma City Blue (NBA G League)	
D. J. Augustin	March 1	Los Angeles Lakers (Signed for rest of season)	Houston Rockets (Waived on February 10)	
Alize Johnson	March 2	New Orleans Pelicans	Washington Wizards (Last 10-day contract ended January 6)	
Isaiah Thomas	March 2	Charlotte Hornets	Grand Rapids Gold (NBA G League)	
DeAndre Jordan	March 3	Philadelphia 76ers (Signed for rest of season)	Los Angeles Lakers (Waived on March 1)	
Devontae Cacok	March 4	San Antonio Spurs (Previously on a two-way contract)		
Drew Eubanks	March 4	Portland Trail Blazers (Second 10-day contract)		
Nik Stauskas	March 4	Boston Celtics (Signed to multi-year contract)	Grand Rapids Gold (NBA G League)	
Joe Wieskamp	March 4	San Antonio Spurs (Previously on a two-way contract)		
Malik Fitts	March 5	Boston Celtics (Second 10-day contract)		
Kelan Martin	March 5	Boston Celtics (Second 10-day contract)		
Armoni Brooks	March 7	Toronto Raptors	College Park Skyhawks (NBA G League)	
Haywood Highsmith	March 8	Miami Heat (Signed to multi-year contract)		
Moses Brown	March 10	Cleveland Cavaliers	Dallas Mavericks (Waived on February 11)	
Tyrone Wallace	March 11	New Orleans Pelicans	Long Island Nets (NBA G League)	
Alize Johnson	March 12	New Orleans Pelicans (Second 10-day contract; previously waived on March 11)		
Isaiah Thomas	March 12	Charlotte Hornets (Second 10-day contract)		
Kris Dunn	March 14	Portland Trail Blazers	Agua Caliente Clippers (NBA G League)	
Drew Eubanks	March 14	Portland Trail Blazers (Third 10-day contract)		
Malik Fitts	March 15	Boston Celtics (Signed for rest of season)		
Armoni Brooks	March 16	Toronto Raptors (Second 10-day contract)		
Justin Anderson	March 17	Indiana Pacers (Second 10-day contract)	Fort Wayne Mad Ants (NBA G League)	
Moses Brown	March 21	Cleveland Cavaliers (Second 10-day contract)		
Tyrone Wallace	March 21	New Orleans Pelicans (Second 10-day contract)		
Jeff Dowtin	March 22	Orlando Magic	Lakeland Magic (NBA G League)	
Isaiah Thomas	March 22	Charlotte Hornets (Signed for rest of season)		
Kris Dunn	March 24	Portland Trail Blazers (Second 10-day contract)		
Drew Eubanks	March 24	Portland Trail Blazers (Fourth 10-day contract)		
Braxton Key	March 24	Detroit Pistons	Delaware Blue Coats (NBA G League)	
Armoni Brooks	March 26	Toronto Raptors (Signed to multi-year contract)		
Amir Coffey	March 26	Los Angeles Clippers (Previously on a two-way contract)		
Jose Alvarado	March 28	New Orleans Pelicans (Signed to multi-year contract; previously on a two-way contract)		
Justin Anderson	March 28	Indiana Pacers (Third 10-day contract)		
Greg Monroe	March 28	Utah Jazz	Capital City Go-Go (NBA G League)	
Juwan Morgan	March 28	Boston Celtics	Maine Celtics (NBA G League)	
Brandon Knight	March 29	Dallas Mavericks (Second 10-day contract)	Sioux Falls Skyforce (NBA G League)	
Reggie Perry	March 30	Portland Trail Blazers (Second 10-day contract)	Raptors 905 (NBA G League)	
Devin Cannady	March 31	Orlando Magic	Lakeland Magic (NBA G League)	
RJ Nembhard	March 31	Cleveland Cavaliers (Previously on a two-way contract)		
Jaylen Hoard	April 1	Oklahoma City Thunder (Signed for rest of season)	Oklahoma City Blue (NBA G League)	
Kris Dunn	April 3	Portland Trail Blazers (Signed for rest of season)		
Drew Eubanks	April 3	Portland Trail Blazers (Signed for rest of season)		
Carsen Edwards	April 3	Detroit Pistons (Signed to multi-year contract)	Salt Lake City Stars (NBA G League)	
Georgios Kalaitzakis	April 5	Oklahoma City Thunder (Signed for rest of season)	Oklahoma City Blue (NBA G League)	
Zavier Simpson	April 5	Oklahoma City Thunder (Signed for rest of season)	Oklahoma City Blue (NBA G League)	
Luca Vildoza	April 6	Milwaukee Bucks (Signed to multi-year contract)	New York Knicks (Waived on October 3)	
Skylar Mays	April 7	Atlanta Hawks (Previously on a two-way contract)		
Greg Monroe	April 7	Minnesota Timberwolves (Signed for rest of season)	Utah Jazz (10-day contract expired on April 6)	
Terry Taylor	April 7	Indiana Pacers (Signed to multi-year contract; previously on a two-way contract)		
Duane Washington Jr.	April 7	Indiana Pacers (Signed to multi-year contract; previously on a two-way contract)		
Wenyen Gabriel	April 8	Los Angeles Lakers (Previously on a two-way contract)		
Rayjon Tucker	April 8	Milwaukee Bucks (Signed to multi-year contract)	Wisconsin Herd (NBA G League)	
Juwan Morgan	April 9	Boston Celtics (Signed to multi-year contract; 10-day contract expired on April 6)		
Reggie Perry	April 9	Portland Trail Blazers (Signed for rest of season)		
Moses Brown	April 10	Cleveland Cavaliers (Previously on a two-way contract)		
Devin Cannady	April 10	Orlando Magic (Signed for rest of season)		
Kessler Edwards	April 10	Brooklyn Nets (Previously on a two-way contract)		
Trent Forrest	April 10	Utah Jazz (Previously on a two-way contract)		
Ish Wainright	April 10	Phoenix Suns (Previously on a two-way contract)		
Al-Farouq Aminu			Boston Celtics (10-day contract expired on January 3)	
Justin Anderson			Indiana Pacers (10-day contract expired on April 6)	
Trevor Ariza			Los Angeles Lakers (Waived on April 7)	
Aron Baynes			Toronto Raptors (Waived on August 4)	
DeAndre' Bembry			Milwaukee Bucks (Waived on April 7)	
Michael Carter-Williams			Orlando Magic (Waived on February 10)	
Willie Cauley-Stein			Philadelphia 76ers (Waived on March 3)	
Mamadi Diakite			Oklahoma City Thunder (Waived on February 9)	
Sekou Doumbouya			Los Angeles Lakers (Waived on March 1; previously on a two-way contract)	
PJ Dozier			Orlando Magic (Waived on February 10)	
Tim Frazier			Cleveland Cavaliers (10-day contract expired on March 6)	
Marcus Garrett			Miami Heat (Waived on January 16; previously on a two-way contract)	
Solomon Hill			New York Knicks (Waived on January 19)	
Ersan İlyasova			Chicago Bulls (10-day contract expired on December 31)	
Alize Johnson			New Orleans Pelicans (10-day contract expired on March 21)	
James Johnson			Brooklyn Nets (Waived on April 7)	
Joe Johnson			Boston Celtics (10-day contract expired on December 31)	
Tyler Johnson			San Antonio Spurs (10-day contract expired on January 15)	
Frank Kaminsky			Phoenix Suns (Waived on April 7)	
Enes Kanter Freedom			Houston Rockets (Waived on February 14)	
Brandon Knight			Dallas Mavericks (10-day contract expired on April 8)	
Alfonzo McKinnie			Chicago Bulls (Waived on February 19)	
Sam Merrill			Memphis Grizzlies (Waived on January 2)	
E'Twaun Moore			Orlando Magic (Waived on February 10)	
Abdel Nader			Phoenix Suns (Waived on February 10)	
Semi Ojeleye			Los Angeles Clippers (Waived on March 26)	
KZ Okpala			Oklahoma City Thunder (Waived on February 11)	
Eugene Omoruyi			Dallas Mavericks (Waived on December 26; previously on a two-way contract)	
Miye Oni			New Orleans Pelicans (10-day contract expired on February 13)	
Jabari Parker			Boston Celtics (Waived on January 7)	
Patrick Patterson			Portland Trail Blazers (Waived on October 16)	
Jontay Porter			Memphis Grizzlies (Waived on July 31)	
Grant Riller			Philadelphia 76ers (Waived on December 19; previously on a two-way contract)	
Justin Robinson			Detroit Pistons (10-day contract expired on January 6)	
Luka Šamanić			New York Knicks (Waived on March 17; previously on a two-way contract)	
Olivier Sarr			Oklahoma City Thunder (Waived on April 6; previously on a two-way contract)	
Mike Scott			Philadelphia 76ers	
Chris Smith			Detroit Pistons (Waived on April 3; previously on a two-way contract)	
Dennis Smith Jr.			Portland Trail Blazers (Waived on February 21)	
Edmond Sumner			Brooklyn Nets (Waived on October 10)	
Keifer Sykes			Indiana Pacers (Waived on April 7)	
Anthony Tolliver			New Orleans Pelicans (Contract voided on December 27)	
Anderson Varejão			Cleveland Cavaliers	
Brad Wanamaker			Washington Wizards (10-day contract expired on January 8)	
Paul Watson			Oklahoma City Thunder (Waived on February 10; previously on a two-way contract)	
Cody Zeller			Portland Trail Blazers (Waived on February 8)	

* Player option
** Team option
*** Early termination option
