= 2020 CEBL–U Sports Draft =

Canadian Elite Basketball League draft

General information
- Sport: Basketball
- Date: March 26, 2020

Overview
- 21 total selections in 3 rounds
- League: Canadian Elite Basketball League
- Teams: 7
- First selection: Tajinder Lall, Ottawa Blackjacks

The 2020 CEBL–U Sports Draft is the second CEBL Draft, being revealed on March 26. Seven Canadian Elite Basketball League (CEBL) teams will select 21 athletes in total.

== Format ==
The draft order for the first round is determined by how the teams finished in the 2019 CEBL season, with the Ottawa Blackjacks getting the first overall, and for the rest is last place, to the league champion. A "snake draft" was used, with the order reversing in even-numbered rounds, and the original order in odd-numbered rounds. The draft order for the first round was determined as follows:

1. Ottawa Blackjacks
2. Fraser Valley Bandits
3. Guelph Knighthawks
4. Edmonton Stingers
5. Niagara River Lions
6. Hamilton Honey Badgers
7. Saskatchewan Rattlers

== Player selection ==
=== Round 1 ===
Pick	Team	Player	Hometown	School team
1	Ottawa Blackjacks	Tajinder Lall	Montreal, Quebec	Carleton
2	Fraser Valley Bandits	Parmvir Bains	Surrey, British Columbia	Fraser Valley
3	Guelph Nighthawks	Marcus Anderson	Brampton, Ontario	Carleton
4	Edmonton Stingers	Alexander Kappos	Miami, Florida	Dalhousie
5	Niagara River Lions	Emmanuel Owootoah	Toronto, Ontario	Brock
6	Hamilton Honey Badgers	Kadre Gray	Toronto, Ontario	Laurentian
7	Saskatchewan Rattlers	Chan De Ciman	Regina, Saskatchewan	Saskatchewan

=== Round 2 ===
Pick	Team	Player	Hometown	School team
8	Saskatchewan Rattlers	Rashawn Browne	Toronto, Ontario	Manitoba
9	Hamilton Honey Badgers	Lock Lam	Ottawa, Ontario	Lakehead
10	Niagara River Lions	Daniel Cayer	Pierrefonds, Quebec	Brock
11	Edmonton Stingers	Prince Kamunga	Toronto, Ontario	York
12	Guelph Nighthawks	Ali Sow	Ottawa, Ontario	Laurier
13	Fraser Valley Bandits	Daniel Adediran	Surrey, British Columbia	Fraser Valley
14	Ottawa Blackjacks	Lloyd Pandi	Ottawa, Ontario	Carleton

=== Round 3 ===
Pick	Team	Player	Hometown	School team
15	Ottawa Blackjacks	Alain Louis	Montreal, Quebec	Carleton
16	Fraser Valley Bandits	Kenan Hadzovic	Abbotsford, British Columbia	Fraser Valley
17	Guelph Nighthawks	Mitch Saunders	Oakville, Ontario	Brock
18	Edmonton Stingers	Xavier Ocho	Milton, Ontario	Dalhousie
19	Niagara River Lions	Kascius Small-Martin	Markham, Ontario	Brock
20	Hamilton Honey Badgers	Eric Rwahwire	Toronto, Ontario	Toronto
21	Saskatchewan Rattlers	Alexander Dewar	Saskatoon, Saskatchewan	Saskatchewan
