= 2021 CEBL season =

Canadian basketball league season

- League: Canadian Elite Basketball League
- Sport: Basketball
- Duration: Season: June 24 – August 10; Playoffs: August 14–22
- Games: 14 per team
- Teams: 7
- TV partner: CBC Sports

Draft
- Top draft pick: Nervens Demosthene
- Picked by: Saskatchewan Rattlers

Regular season
- Top seed: Edmonton Stingers
- Season MVP: Xavier Moon
- Top scorer: Xavier Moon

Championship Weekend
- Venue: Edmonton Expo Centre; Edmonton, Alberta
- Champions: Edmonton Stingers (2nd Title)
- Runners-up: Niagara River Lions
- Finals MVP: Xavier Moon

Seasons
- ← 2020 2022 →

The 2021 CEBL season was the third season of the Canadian Elite Basketball League (CEBL). It began on June 24, 2021. The CEBL planned to have fans at the home arenas, depending on the situation of the pandemic but would have had regional bubbles if needed. On June 10, 2021, the league announced that teams would be playing at their home arenas, but fans are still dependent on the provincial governments. On June 21, 2021, the league announced the playoffs would start on August 14, where four teams will play for two spots in the Championship Weekend. The final two spots will be filled in by the top team in the league and by the host team, Edmonton Stingers. The Championship Weekend will be held from August 18 to 22. Starting July 21, all seven teams were allowed to bring some amount of fans (either full capacity or limited) to the home games. The Edmonton Stingers defeated the Niagara River Lions 101–65 for their 2nd consecutive CEBL title, becoming the league's first back-to-back champions.

== Teams ==
2021 Canadian Elite Basketball League
Team	City	Arena	Capacity
Edmonton Stingers	Edmonton, Alberta	Edmonton Expo Centre	4,000
Fraser Valley Bandits	Abbotsford, British Columbia	Abbotsford Centre	7,046
Guelph Nighthawks	Guelph, Ontario	Sleeman Centre	4,715
Hamilton Honey Badgers	Hamilton, Ontario	FirstOntario Centre	17,383
Niagara River Lions	St. Catharines, Ontario	Meridian Centre	4,030
Ottawa BlackJacks	Ottawa, Ontario	TD Place Arena	9,500
Saskatchewan Rattlers	Saskatoon, Saskatchewan	SaskTel Centre	15,100

=== Map of teams ===
CEBL Teams

== Regular season ==
=== Standings ===
Pos	Team	Pld	W	L	PF	PA	PD	PCT	Qualification
1	Edmonton Stingers (H, C)	14	13	1	1279	1049	+230	.929	Advance to championship weekend
2	Niagara River Lions	14	10	4	1204	1126	+78	.714	Advance to championship weekend
3	Hamilton Honey Badgers	14	9	5	1180	1192	−12	.643	Advance to quarter-finals
4	Fraser Valley Bandits	14	7	7	1204	1188	+16	.500	Advance to quarter-finals
5	Guelph Nighthawks	14	5	9	1235	1217	+18	.357	Advance to quarter-finals
6	Ottawa BlackJacks	14	4	10	1169	1249	−80	.286	Advance to quarter-finals
7	Saskatchewan Rattlers	14	1	13	1008	1192	−184	.071	

Source: CEBL
(C) Champions; (H) Hosts

=== Results ===
Teams	EDM	FRA	GUE	HAM	NIA	OTT	SAS	EDM	FRA	GUE	HAM	NIA	OTT	SAS
Edmonton Stingers	—	106–65	—	91–87	82–75	104–87	101–60	—	88–87	—	—	—	—	85–78
Fraser Valley Bandits	79–87	—	92–71	—	104–81	92–77	92–74	79–91	—	—	—	—	—	86–66
Guelph Nighthawks	84–97	—	—	76–85	69–89	90–87	83–86	—	—	—	78–80	—	89–85	—
Hamilton Honey Badgers	63–99	96–93	102–98	—	78–76	87–75	—	—	—	101–89	—	81–84	—	—
Niagara River Lions	—	103–82	81–92	71–68	—	94–92	86–74	—	—	—	100–77	—	89–79	—
Ottawa BlackJacks	79–74	90–84	96–79	92–99	77–103	—	82–69	—	—	71–96	—	—	—	—
Saskatchewan Rattlers	56–87	79–85	74–90	71–73	71–72	—	—	70–87	79–84	—	—	—	—	—

Source: https://www.cebl.ca/result2fiba
Legend: Blue = left column team win; Red = top row team win.

== Playoffs ==
=== Bracket ===
Quarter-finals; August 14 & 15
3	Hamilton	94
6	Ottawa	96
4	Fraser Valley	104
5	Guelph	84

Semi-finals; August 20
1	Edmonton	94
6	Ottawa	87
2	Niagara	84
4	Fraser Valley	82

Final; August 22
1	Edmonton	101
2	Niagara	65

=== Quarter-finals ===
CBC

August 14
4:00pm

Box score

Hamilton Honey Badgers 94, Ottawa BlackJacks 96
Scoring by quarter: 19–14, 19–29, 31–27, 25–26
Pts: Nino Johnson 16; Rebs: Nino Johnson 11; Asts: Lindell Wigginton 5	Pts: Kadre Gray 32; Rebs: Chad Posthumus 20; Asts: Junior Cadougan 4

FirstOntario Centre, Hamilton, Ontario
Attendance: 812
Referees: F. Rizzuti J. Stiell R. Caporicci

CBC

August 15
4:00pm

Box score

Fraser Valley Bandits 104, Guelph Nighthawks 84
Scoring by quarter: 24–15, 34–20, 30–30, 16–19
Pts: Brandon Gilbeck 26; Rebs: Brandon Gilbeck 10; Asts: Shaquille Keith 9	Pts: Michael Bryson 24; Rebs: Michael Bryson, Matt Neufeld 6 Asts: Cat Barber 4

Abbotsford Centre, Abbotsford, British Columbia
Attendance: N/A
Referees: R. Scott T. Cervo T. Turnbull

== Championship Weekend ==
=== Semi-finals ===
CBC

August 20
7:00pm

Box score

Niagara River Lions 84, Fraser Valley Bandits 82
Scoring by quarter: 23–13, 19–23, 22–24, 20–22
Pts: Javin Delaurier 20; Rebs: Javin Delaurier 10; Asts: Philip Scrubb 7	Pts: Alex Campbell 19; Rebs: Brandon Gilbeck 14; Asts: Kenny Manigault 7

Edmonton Expo Centre, Edmonton, Alberta
Attendance: 1,000
Referees: P. Stothaert T. Turnbull R. Kerrisen

CBC

August 20
9:30pm

Box score

Edmonton Stingers 94, Ottawa BlackJacks 87
Scoring by quarter: 30–23, 21–22, 14–23, 29–19
Pts: Xavier Moon 22; Rebs: Marlon Johnson 5 Asts: Xavier Moon 8	Pts: Nick Ward 17; Rebs: Chad Posthumus 11; Asts: Kyle Gray 9

Edmonton Expo Centre, Edmonton, Alberta
Attendance: 1,600
Referees: R. Scott J. Stiell M. Fiedelleck

=== Final ===
CBC

August 22
4:00pm

box score

Edmonton Stingers 101, Niagara River Lions 65
Scoring by quarter: 22-12, 20-17, 28-18, 31-18
Pts: Xavier Moon 28; Rebs: Brady Skeens 8 Asts: Xavier Moon 10	Pts: Philip Scrubb 17; Rebs: Daniel Mullings 7 Asts: Philip Scrubb 6

Edmonton Expo Centre, Edmonton, Alberta
Attendance: 2,710
Referees: P. Stothaert R. Kerrison J. Stiel

== Awards ==
- Player of the Year: Xavier Moon Edmonton Stingers
- Canadian Player of the Year: Lindell Wigginton Hamilton Honey Badgers
- U Sports Developmental Player of the Year: Lloyd Pandi Niagara River Lions
- Defensive Player of the Year: Brandon Gilbeck Fraser Valley Bandits
- Referee of the Year: Perry Stothaert
- Clutch Player of the Year: Lindell Wigginton Hamilton Honey Badgers
- Coach of the Year: Jermaine Small Edmonton Stingers
- 6th man of the year: Adika Peter-McNeilly Edmonton Stingers
- CEBL Final MVP: Xavier Moon Edmonton Stingers

=== All-CEBL teams ===
First Team		Pos.	Second Team	
Player	Team	Pos.	Player	Team
Jordan Baker	Edmonton Stingers	F	Marlon Johnson JR	Edmonton Stingers
Nick Ward	Ottawa BlackJacks	F	Brandon Gilbeck	Fraser Valley Bandits
Javin Delaurier	Niagara River Lions	F	Ahmed Hill	Guelph Nighthawks
Xavier Moon	Edmonton Stingers	G	Cat Barber	Guelph Nighthawks
Lindell Wigginton	Hamilton Honey Badgers	G	Alex Campbell	Fraser Valley Bandits

=== All-Canadian team ===
Pos.	Player	Team
F	Shaquille Keith	Fraser Valley Bandits
F	Tommy Scrubb	Niagara River Lions
F	Jordan Baker	Edmonton Stingers
G	Alex Campbell	Fraser Valley Bandits
G	Lindell Wigginton	Hamilton Honey Badgers

== Statistics ==
=== Individual statistic leaders ===
Category	Player	Team(s)	Statistic
Points per game	Xavier Moon	Edmonton Stingers	23.1
Rebounds per game	Javin DeLaurier	Niagara River Lions	10.4
Assists per game	Xavier Moon	Edmonton Stingers	5.3
Steals per game	Demarcus Holland	Saskatchewan Rattlers	2.4
Blocks per game	Brandon Gilbeck	Fraser Valley Bandits	2.7
FG%	Ryan Wright	Ottawa BlackJacks	71.7%
3P%	Nino Johnson	Hamilton Honey Badgers	44.4%
