= Khalil Ahmad (basketball) =

American basketball player (born 1996)

No. 4 – Niagara River Lions
- Position: Guard
- League: CEBL

Personal information
- Born: December 24, 1996 (age 29) Anaheim, California, U.S.
- Listed height: 6 ft 4 in (1.93 m)
- Listed weight: 185 lb (84 kg)

Career information
- High school: Centennial High School
- College: Cal State Fullerton (2015–2019)
- NBA draft: 2019: undrafted
- Playing career: 2019–present

Career history
- 2019–2020: Keflavik
- 2020–2021: Horsens IC
- 2022: Niagara River Lions
- 2022–2023: Hapoel Be'er Sheva
- 2023: Niagara River Lions
- 2023–2024: Filou Oostende
- 2024: Niagara River Lions
- 2024–2025: Victoria Libertas Pesaro
- 2025–2026: Maccabi Rishon LeZion
- 2026: New Basket Brindisi
- 2026–present: Niagara River Lions

Career highlights
- BNXT League champion (2024); Belgian League champion (2024); 2x CEBL champion (2024, 2025); 2x CEBL Finals MVP (2024, 2025); CEBL Player of the Year (2022); CEBL Defensive Player of the year (2023); 2× CEBL Clutch Player of the Year (2022, 2023); CEBL scoring champion (2022); CEBL steals leader (2023); 3× All-CEBL First Team (2022–2024)

Khalil-Ullah Ahmad (born December 24, 1996) is an American professional basketball player for the Niagara River Lions of the Canadian Elite Basketball League (CEBL). He played college basketball for Cal State Fullerton.

== Early life and high school ==
Ahmad was born in Anaheim, California, to Tariq and Michelle Ahmad, has a younger sister, Aliyah, and his hometown is Corona, California, southeast of Los Angeles. He is 6 ft 4 in (193 cm) tall, and weighs 185 pounds (84 kg).

He played high school basketball at both guard positions for Centennial High School ('15) in Corona. As a senior Ahmad averaged 11.8 points, 7.2 rebounds, and 2.3 assists per game.

== College career ==
Ahmad played college basketball for the Titans for Cal State Fullerton ('19) from 2015 to 2019. In 2016 he averaged 14.3 points per game (7th in the Big West Conference) as the league's top scoring freshman, and was 8th in the conference with a .772 free throw percentage, along with 4.4 rebounds and 1.6 assists per game, and was named Big West Freshman of the Year and All-Big West Honorable Mention.

As a junior in 2017–18 he scored 15.1 points per game (6th in the Big West), with 1.2 steals per game (8th) and an .829 free throw percentage (5th). In 2018–19 he scored 18.2 points per game (4th in the Big West), and led he league in steals with 1.6 per game, while shooting an .814 free throw percentage (6th). In both 2018 and 2019 he was named All-Big West Second Team and Big West All-Tournament Team. In 2019 he then played in the invite-only Drew Summer League in Los Angeles.

== Professional career ==
In 2019–20 Ahmad played for Keflavik in the Úrvalsdeild karla in Iceland. He averaged 19.1 points, 4.6 rebounds, 3.0 assists, and 2.1 steals per game.

In 2021–22 he first played for Horsens IC of Basketligaen in Denmark, averaging 19.2 points per game (4th in the league), 4.5 assists per game (10th), and 1.8 steals per game (6th). Ahmad was named to the Eurobasket.com All-Danish Ligaen Second Team.

That season Ahmad next played for the Niagara River Lions of the CEBL, with whom he averaged a league-high 20.7 points per game, with 4.6 assists per game (7th-most in the league) and 1.9 steals (4th-best). In 2021–22 he was named both Canadian Elite Basketball League Player of the Year and Canadian Elite Basketball League Clutch Player of the Year. In September 2022, at the invitation of the NBA's Utah Jazz, he attended a mini-camp that they held.

In 2022–23 Ahmad played for Hapoel Be'er Sheva in the Israeli Basketball Premier League.

On June 1, 2023, Ahmad re-signed with the Niagara River Lions.

On August 9, 2023, Ahmad signed with Filou Oostende.

On February 29, 2024, Ahmad agreed to return to the Niagara River Lions for a third stint. In May 2025, he returned to the River Lions. At the end of the 2025 season, Ahmad was awarded Finals MVP.

On June 28, 2024, Ahmad signed with Carpegna Prosciutto Basket Pesaro of the Italian Serie A2. At the end of the season, he was named to the All-Italian Serie A2 Fourth Team.
