= Ken Murray (basketball coach) =

Canadian basketball coach

- Position: Head coach

Career history

Coaching
- 1982–1989: Regina (CIS)
- 1989–2010: Brock (CIS)
- 2015: Niagara River Lions (Canada)

Career highlights
- 2× CIS champion (1992, 2008)

Ken Murray is a Canadian professional and college basketball coach.

== Career ==
Murray played college basketball at Brock University from 1972 to 1977. He was the Brock Badgers' Most Valuable Player in each season and was presented with Conference All-Star accolades four times (1973–1976). Murray closed out the 1973-74 season as the third leading scorer in the country. In the 1974-75 campaign, he ranked first nationally in free-throw shooting. He became the all-time leading scorer and rebounder in the Ontario Universities Athletic Association (OUAA). In 1978, he had his jersey number (#50) retired.

Murray was appointed head coach of the University of Regina men's basketball team in 1982. He turned around a program that had won only a single game over the previous four seasons and had lost 62 consecutive games. In 1989, Murray coached the Cougars to their first ever CIAU Championship appearance, where they reached the semifinals. Under his guidance, Regina's Chris Biegler was named the national player of the year in 1987. Murray had a total of 39 regular season wins and six postseason victories during his Regina stint and was named GPAC Coach of the Year in 1984 and 1989 as well as CIAU Coach of the Year in 1989.

He led the Badgers of Brock University to two national titles in 1992 and 2008. During his tenure, Murray guided the team to five CIS Final 8 tournaments appearances. He set a Brock University record by winning 535 games. Murray received CIS Coach of the Year honours in 1992 and was the winner of the St. Catharines Sportsman of the Year award in 1992 and 2008.

In 2015, Murray served as head coach and general manager of the Niagara River Lions of the National Basketball League of Canada (NBL). He had a record of 5 wins and 14 losses in his lone NBL season.

Murray was inducted into the Brock Athletics Hall of Fame in 1996, the Brock Basketball Hall of Fame in 2009, the St. Catharines Sports Hall of Fame in 2011 and into the Ontario Basketball Association Hall of Fame in 2019.
