= Kimbal Mackenzie =

Canadian-British basketball coach

Niagara River Lions
- Title: Head coach
- League: CEBL

Personal information
- Born: September 16, 1996 (age 30) Oakville, Ontario, Canada
- Listed height: 6 ft 1 in (1.85 m)
- Listed weight: 195 lb (88 kg)

Career information
- High school: The John Carroll School (Bel Air, Maryland)
- College: Bucknell (2015–2019)
- NBA draft: 2019: undrafted
- Playing career: 2019–2026
- Position: Point guard
- Coaching career: 2026–present

Career history

Playing
- 2018–2021: Guelph Nighthawks
- 2019–2020: UEMC Real Valladolid Baloncesto
- 2020–2021: Lobe Huesca La Magia
- 2021–2024: Leicester Riders
- 2022–2025: Niagara River Lions

Coaching
- 2026–present: Niagara River Lions

Career highlights
- First-team All-Patriot League (2019); Third-team All-Patriot League (2018)

Kimbal Joseph Mackenzie (born September 16, 1996) is a British-Canadian professional basketball coach and former professional basketball player who currently serves as the head coach and general manager of the Romell Niagara River Lions.

== Early life ==
A citizen of England and Canada, Mackenzie is a native of Oakville, Canada.

Mackenzie played high school basketball at The John Carroll School in Bel Air, Maryland, United States.

At John Carroll, Mackenzie was a three year starter and team captain for the basketball team. As a senior, he averaged 14.3 points per game and led John Carroll to a 28-9 record. In his high school career he amassed 1,577 total points.

== Playing career ==
Mackenzie played college basketball for the Bucknell Bison from 2015 to 2019. With the Bison he was named to the 2019 All-Patriot League first team and 2019 All-Patriot League tournament 1st team, while averaging a career high 17.6 points, 2.8 rebounds, and 3.0 assists per game as a senior.

After going undrafted in the 2019 NBA Draft, MacKenzie went on to play professionally internationally for the Guelph Nighthawks, UEMC Real Valladolid Baloncesto, Lobe Huesca La Magia, Leicester Riders, and Niagara River Lions.

== Coaching career ==
On February 2, 2026, it was announced that Mackenzie would be taking over as head coach of the Niagara River Lions.
