= Tazé Moore =

American basketball player (born 1998)

No. 4 – Nanjing Monkey Kings
- Position: Shooting guard / point guard
- League: CBA

Personal information
- Born: June 29, 1998 (age 28) Memphis, Tennessee, U.S.
- Listed height: 6 ft 5 in (1.96 m)
- Listed weight: 195 lb (88 kg)

Career information
- High school: Southaven (Southaven, Mississippi)
- College: Cal State Bakersfield (2016–2021); Houston (2021–2022)
- NBA draft: 2022: undrafted
- Playing career: 2022–present

Career history
- 2022: BG Göttingen
- 2022–2024: Texas Legends
- 2024: Rip City Remix
- 2024: Portland Trail Blazers
- 2024: Vancouver Bandits
- 2024–2025: Portland Trail Blazers
- 2024–2025: →Rip City Remix
- 2025–2026: Varese
- 2026–present: Nanjing Monkey Kings

Career highlights
- CEBL Player of the Year (2024); All-CEBL First Team (2024); CEBL assist leader (2024); First-team All-Big West (2021); Big West All-Defensive team (2021)
- Stats at NBA.com
- Stats at Basketball Reference

Tazé Raekwon Moore (born June 29, 1998) is an American professional basketball player for the Nanjing Monkey Kings of the Chinese Basketball Association (CBA). He played college basketball for the Cal State Bakersfield Roadrunners and the Houston Cougars.

== College career ==
Moore began his college career at Cal State Bakersfield. He played for the Roadrunners from 2016 to 2021, earning first-team All-Big West Conference honors as a senior. He struggled with injuries during his CSUB career, missing the entire 2017–18 season with a broken tibia and fibula in his right knee. Following the 2020–21 season, he entered the NCAA transfer portal.

Moore ultimately chose the University of Houston and coach Kelvin Sampson for his final year of eligibility. He was a starter for a Cougars team that went 32–6, averaging 10.4 points and 4.9 rebounds in his sole season with the team.

== Professional career ==
=== BG Göttingen (2022) ===
After going undrafted in the 2022 NBA draft, Moore joined the Brooklyn Nets for the 2022 NBA Summer League and on August 4, 2024, he signed with BG Göttingen of the Basketball Bundesliga, where he played one game before leaving the team on October 6.

=== Texas Legends, Rip City Remix and Portland Trail Blazers (2022–2024) ===
On October 22, 2022, Moore joined the Texas Legends of the NBA G League after being selected 9th overall in the 2022 NBA G League draft. Across the 2022–23 season, he averaged 13.9 points, 3.7 assists and 6.7 rebounds per game.

On October 16, 2023, Moore signed with the Dallas Mavericks, but was waived the next day. Twelve days later, he rejoined the Legends and on January 11, 2024, he was traded to the Rip City Remix.

On January 20, 2024, Moore signed a 10-day contract with the Portland Trail Blazers, making his NBA debut the next day. He scored two points and recorded a steal in 4 minutes off the bench. The move made Moore the first player in Remix franchise history to earn an NBA call-up. On January 30, he returned to the Remix. On April 14, he signed with the Trail Blazers for the rest of the season.

=== Vancouver Bandits (2024) ===
On April 18, 2024, Moore signed with the Vancouver Bandits of the Canadian Elite Basketball League.

=== Return to Portland / Rip City (2024–2025) ===
On September 13, 2024, Moore signed a two-way contract with the Portland Trail Blazers.

=== Pallacanestro Varese (2025–2026) ===
On July 24, 2025, he signed with Pallacanestro Varese of the Lega Basket Serie A (LBA).

== National team career ==
Moore represented the US in 3x3 basketball, playing for Team Washington DC in the 2023 FIBA 3x3 World Tour.

== Career statistics ==
Legend
GP	Games played	GS	Games started	MPG	Minutes per game
FG%	Field goal percentage	3P%	3-point field goal percentage	FT%	Free throw percentage
RPG	Rebounds per game	APG	Assists per game	SPG	Steals per game
BPG	Blocks per game	PPG	Points per game	**Bold**	Career high

=== NBA ===
Year	Team	GP	GS	MPG	FG%	3P%	FT%	RPG	APG	SPG	BPG	PPG
2023–24	Portland	**4**	0	**10.1**	**.421**	.143	**.500**	2.0	**1.3**	.5	.0	**4.5**
2024–25	Portland	2	0	9.9	.200	**.250**	**.500**	**4.0**	.5	**1.0**	.0	3.0
Career		6	0	10.0	.345	.182	.500	2.7	1.0	.7	.0	4.0

=== College ===
Year	Team	GP	GS	MPG	FG%	3P%	FT%	RPG	APG	SPG	BPG	PPG
2016–17	Cal State Bakersfield	24	0	10.8	.479	.294	.636	2.0	.9	.8	.2	2.4
2017–18	Cal State Bakersfield	Injured										
2018–19	Cal State Bakersfield	30	4	18.1	.429	.222	.644	3.0	1.8	1.4	.7	6.4
2019–20	Cal State Bakersfield	31	25	24.9	.482	.360	.652	3.8	1.9	1.2	**.9**	11.5
2020–21	Cal State Bakersfield	23	14	22.3	**.488**	**.514**	**.828**	4.0	2.7	1.3	.6	**12.2**
2021–22	Houston	**36**	**31**	**30.1**	.441	.319	.727	**4.9**	**2.9**	**1.6**	.6	10.4
Career		144	74	22.0	.461	.337	.707	3.6	2.1	1.3	.6	8.8
