= 2024 CEBL season =

- League: Canadian Elite Basketball League
- Sport: Basketball
- Duration: Season: May 21 – July 29; Playoffs: August 2–11
- Games: 20 per team
- Teams: 10
- TV partner: TSN

Draft
- Top draft pick: Ismaël Diouf
- Picked by: Montreal Alliance

Regular season
- Top seed: Vancouver Bandits
- Season MVP: Tazé Moore
- Top scorer: Justin Wright-Foreman

Championship weekend
- Venue: Verdun Auditorium; Montreal, Quebec
- Champions: Niagara River Lions (1st title)
- Runners-up: Vancouver Bandits
- Finals MVP: Khalil Ahmad

Seasons
- ← 2023 2025 →

The 2024 CEBL season was the sixth season of the Canadian Elite Basketball League (CEBL). It began on May 21, 2024, and the regular season ended on July 29, 2024.

== Regular season ==
=== Standings ===
==== Western Conference ====
Pos	Team	Pld	W	L	PF	PA	PD	PCT	Qualification
1	Vancouver Bandits	20	14	6	1893	1716	+177	.700	Advance to championship weekend
2	Edmonton Stingers	20	13	7	1820	1763	+57	.650	Advance to quarter-finals
3	Calgary Surge	20	11	9	1831	1771	+60	.550	Advance to play in games
4	Winnipeg Sea Bears	20	9	11	1842	1912	−70	.450	Advance to play in games
5	Saskatchewan Rattlers	20	6	14	1757	1865	−108	.300	

Source: CEBL

==== Eastern Conference ====
Pos	Team	Pld	W	L	PF	PA	PD	PCT	Qualification
1	Niagara River Lions (C)	20	14	6	1882	1754	+128	.700	Advance to quarter-finals
2	Scarborough Shooting Stars	20	12	8	1868	1810	+58	.600	Advance to play in games
3	Ottawa BlackJacks	20	9	11	1821	1907	−86	.450	Advance to play in games
4	Brampton Honey Badgers	20	6	14	1690	1863	−173	.300	
5	Montreal Alliance (H)	20	6	14	1689	1732	−43	.300	Advance to championship weekend (Note: Automatically qualified for championship weekend as the host team.)

Source: CEBL
(C) Champions; (H) Hosts

=== Attendance ===
As of July 29, 2024 (Note: The following team did not report game attendance: Saskatchewan on July 11)

Pos	Team	Total	High	Low	Average	Change
1	Winnipeg Sea Bears	86,735	11,051	7,607	8,674	+58.2%
2	Vancouver Bandits	38,908	4,538	3,288	3,891	+127.1%^{(Note: Vancouver only reported five games' attendance in 2023)}
3	Calgary Surge	34,506	12,327	1,912	3,451	+15.8%
4	Edmonton Stingers	34,222	4,256	2,019	3,422	−11.3%^{(Note: Edmonton only reported nine games' attendance in 2023)}
5	Niagara River Lions	28,370	3,333	2,396	2,837	−8.7%
6	Montreal Alliance	26,950	3,012	1,979	2,695	−6.4%
7	Saskatchewan Rattlers	21,048	3,211	2,017	2,339	+19.5%^{(Note: Saskatchewan only reported one game's attendance in 2023)}
8	Ottawa BlackJacks	20,523	2,510	1,631	2,052	+6.7%
9	Brampton Honey Badgers	20,000	4,068	1,013	2,000	+27.1%
10	Scarborough Shooting Stars	14,998	1,748	1,242	1,500	−1.0%
	League total	326,260	12,327	1,013	3,296	+15.9%

== Results ==
Teams	BHB	CGY	EDM	MON	NIA	OTT	SSK	SSS	VAN	WPG	BHB	CGY	EDM	MON	NIA	OTT	SSK	SSS	VAN	WPG
Brampton Honey Badgers	—	108–105		85–79	74–67	99–82	69–76	73–81	108–83	90–92	—					79–94		98–96		
Calgary Surge	88–76	—	79–97	90–80			102–85	97–104	65–70	110–78		—	84–91						97–94	87–83
Edmonton Stingers	99–79	80–91	—		79–100	92–91	93–77		90–93	89–86		58–87	—				88–81		99–82	
Montreal Alliance	95–77		77–81	—	80–94	86–87	89–72	93–86	80–78	80–73	87–90			—		84–76				
Niagara River Lions	103–60	109–89	105–104	97–95	—	110–86		81–78		101–94	80–71			83–77	—	109–97				
Ottawa BlackJacks	116–104	90–100	84–92	89–104	90–86	—	98–92	102–80						92–91	122–113	—		79–92		
Saskatchewan Rattlers	104–93	77–105	87–91	96–90	87–94		—	99–105	98–86	94–86		87–95					—			96–84
Scarborough Shooting Stars	105–92	93–82	103–92	92–84	95–87	105–91		—	90–104		106–90			91–71	77–98			—		
Vancouver Bandits		100–74	88–107	95–75	105–83	104–67	98–85	88–83	—	112–91							99–70		—	103–92
Winnipeg Sea Bears		111–104	87–97		94–82	93–80	103–101	109–106	88–84	—			102–101				97–93		99–102	—

Updated to match(es) played on July 23, 2024. Source: https://www.cebl.ca/result2fiba
Legend: Blue = left column team win; Red = top row team win.

== Playoffs ==
=== Bracket ===
Play-in round August 2
E2	Scarborough	73
E3	Ottawa	90
W3	Calgary	84
W4	Winnipeg	82

Quarterfinals; August 4
E1	Niagara	94
E3	Ottawa	91
W2	Edmonton	69
W3	Calgary	78

Semifinals; August 9
E1	Niagara	78
E5	Montreal	75
W1	Vancouver	89
W3	Calgary	87

Championship; August 11
E1	Niagara	97
W1	Vancouver	95

=== Play-in games ===
Note: all times are local

TSN2

August 2
7:00pm

recap

Scarborough Shooting Stars 73, Ottawa BlackJacks 90
Scoring by quarter: 31–18, 12–17, 19–27, 11–28
Pts: Aaron Best, Donovan Williams 17; Rebs: Jalen Adaway, Kalif Young 8 Asts: Jalen Adaway, Cat Barber, Kadre Gray 3	Pts: Isaih Moore 22; Rebs: Isaih Moore 10; Asts: Deng Adel 8

Toronto Pan Am Sports Centre, Scarborough, Ontario
Attendance: 1,622
Referees: Jayson Stiell, Dave Maxin, Christine Vuong

TSN2

August 2
7:30pm

recap

Calgary Surge 84, Winnipeg Sea Bears 82
Scoring by quarter: 28–12, 18–24, 20–22, 18–24
Pts: Mathieu Kamba 27; Rebs: Sean Miller-Moore 14; Asts: Corey Davis Jr 8	Pts: Emmanuel Akot 23; Rebs: Simon Hildebrandt 8 Asts: Scottie Lindsey 5

WinSport Event Centre, Calgary, Alberta
Attendance: 2,574
Referees: Perry Stothart, Neil Donnelly, Cooper Toppings

=== Quarterfinals ===
TSN5

August 4
5:30pm

recap

Niagara River Lions 94, Ottawa BlackJacks 91
Scoring by quarter: 28–19, 21–29, 18–29, 27–14
Pts: Khalil Ahmad 23; Rebs: Jahvon Blair, Nathan Cayo 6 Asts: Khalil Ahmad 8	Pts: Shamar Givance 19; Rebs: Deng Adel 10; Asts: Deng Adel 10

Meridian Centre, St. Catharines, Ontario
Attendance: 4,004
Referees: Nate Saunders, Greg Spagnoli, Chris Buccella

TSN5

August 4
6:00pm

recap

Edmonton Stingers 69, Calgary Surge 78
Scoring by quarter: 21–22, 18–17, 18–24, 15–15
Pts: Jacob Evans III 13; Rebs: Brody Clarke 8 Asts: Elijah Miller, Jacob Evans III 8	Pts: Corey Davis Jr 22; Rebs: Trhae Mitchell, Jordy Tshimanga 8 Asts: Corey Davis Jr 6

Edmonton Expo Centre, Edmonton, Alberta
Attendance: 3,800
Referees: Waseem Husainy, Ryley Kerrison, Farhan Baig

== Championship Weekend ==
=== Semifinals ===
TSN3

August 9
5:30pm

recap

Vancouver Bandits 89, Calgary Surge 87
Scoring by quarter: 20–23, 27–18, 23–26, 19–20
Pts: Mitch Creek 27; Rebs: Tazé Moore 11; Asts: Tazé Moore 5	Pts: Corey Davis Jr 23; Rebs: Mathieu Kamba 13; Asts: Corey Davis Jr 7

Verdun Auditorium, Montreal, Quebec
Attendance: 3,500
Referees: Jayson Stiell, Nate Saunders, Perry Stothart

TSN3

August 9
8:00pm

recap

Niagara River Lions 78, Montreal Alliance 75
Scoring by quarter: 16–11, 22–25, 16–23, 24–16
Pts: Khalil Ahmad 31; Rebs: Omari Moore 13; Asts: Omari Moore, Tj Lall 2	Pts: Ahmed Hill 14; Rebs: Jordan Bowden 11; Asts: Guillaume Payen-Boucard 3

Verdun Auditorium, Montreal, Quebec
Attendance: 3,500
Referees: Waseem Husainy, Ryley Kerrison, Chris Bucella

=== Championship ===
TSN2

August 11
6:00pm

recap

Vancouver Bandits 95, Niagara River Lions 97
Scoring by quarter: 20–23, 26–21, 16–27, 33–26
Pts: Mitch Creek 26; Rebs: Mitch Creek 13; Asts: Zach Copeland 3	Pts: Nathan Cayo 25; Rebs: Omari Moore, Nathan Cayo 8 Asts: Omari Moore 5

Verdun Auditorium, Montreal, Quebec
Attendance: 3,031
Referees: Jayson Stiell, Waseem Husainy, Nate Saunders

== Awards ==
- Most Valuable Player: Tazé Moore, Vancouver Bandits
- Canadian Player of the Year: Koby McEwen, Vancouver Bandits
- Development Player of the Year: Simon Hildebrandt, Winnipeg Sea Bears
- Defensive Player of the Year: Lloyd Pandi, Ottawa BlackJacks
- Clutch Player of the Year: Tevin Brown, Ottawa BlackJacks, Stefan Smith, Calgary Surge
- Coach of the Year: Kyle Julius, Vancouver Bandits
- Sixth Man of the Year: Aaryn Rai, Niagara River Lions
- Referee of the Year: Vernon Bovell
- Community Champion Award: Vancouver Bandits
- CEBL Finals MVP: Khalil Ahmad, Niagara River Lions

=== All-CEBL teams ===
First Team		Pos.	Second Team	
Player	Team	Pos.	Player	Team
Nick Ward	Vancouver Bandits	F	Chris Smith	Montreal Alliance
Khalil Ahmad	Niagara River Lions	G	Teddy Allen	Winnipeg Sea Bears / Saskatchewan Rattlers
Cat Barber	Scarborough Shooting Stars	G	Jahvon Blair	Niagara River Lions
Tazé Moore	Vancouver Bandits	G	Jalen Harris	Saskatchewan Rattlers
Justin Wright-Foreman	Winnipeg Sea Bears	G	Koby McEwen	Vancouver Bandits

=== All-Canadian team ===
Pos.	Player	Team
F	Brody Clarke	Edmonton Stingers
G	Sean Miller-Moore	Calgary Surge
G	Koby McEwen	Vancouver Bandits
G	Jahvon Blair	Niagara River Lions
G	Mathieu Kamba	Calgary Surge
