= 2020 CEBL season =

Canadian professional basketball season

- League: Canadian Elite Basketball League
- Sport: Basketball
- Duration: July 25 – August 9
- Games: 6 per team
- Teams: 7
- TV partner: CBC Sports

Draft
- Top draft pick: Tajinder Lall
- Picked by: Ottawa BlackJacks

Round robin
- Top seed: Edmonton Stingers
- Season MVP: Xavier Moon
- Top scorer: Cameron Forte

Championship
- Venue: Meridian Centre; St. Catharines, Ontario
- Champions: Edmonton Stingers (1st Title)
- Runners-up: Fraser Valley Bandits
- Finals MVP: Xavier Moon

Seasons
- ← 2019 2021 →

The 2020 CEBL season was the second season of the Canadian Elite Basketball League (CEBL). It was played from July 25 to August 9 at the Meridian Centre in St. Catharines, Ontario.

The season was scheduled to take place from May 7 to August 6, with the championship being played in Edmonton from August 14 to 16. On April 15, the season was postponed due to the COVID-19 pandemic.

A shortened 2020 season tournament, branded as the CEBL Summer Series, was held at the Meridian Centre in St. Catharines. A single round robin was played to eliminate one team, followed by a six-team single-elimination playoff. All games were played behind closed doors with no spectators admitted. The Edmonton Stingers defeated the Fraser Valley Bandits in the final to win their first CEBL title.

The 2020 season saw the inclusion of the Ottawa BlackJacks, the CEBL's seventh team and first expansion team. It was also the first in a three-year broadcast partnership with CBC Sports. Host broadcaster Mediapro utilized automated cameras, using AI technology to track the ball and players.

== Teams ==
2020 Canadian Elite Basketball League
Team	City	Arena	Capacity
Edmonton Stingers	Edmonton, Alberta	Edmonton Expo Centre	4,000
Fraser Valley Bandits	Abbotsford, British Columbia	Abbotsford Centre	7,046
Guelph Nighthawks	Guelph, Ontario	Sleeman Centre	4,715
Hamilton Honey Badgers	Hamilton, Ontario	FirstOntario Centre	17,383
Niagara River Lions	St. Catharines, Ontario	Meridian Centre	4,030
Ottawa BlackJacks	Ottawa, Ontario	TD Place Arena	9,500
Saskatchewan Rattlers	Saskatoon, Saskatchewan	SaskTel Centre	15,100

=== Map of teams ===
CEBL Teams

== Rule changes ==
The Elam ending, as used in The Basketball Tournament and the 2020 NBA All-Star Game, was adopted for all games; after the first stoppage within the final four minutes of the fourth quarter, the game clock is stopped, and a target score is established which is nine points greater than the leading team's score. The first team to reach the target score is declared the winner.

== Summer Series ==
=== Round robin ===
Pos	Team	Pld	W	L	PF	PA	PD	PCT	Qualification
1	Edmonton Stingers (C)	6	5	1	537	500	+37	.833	Semi-finals
2	Fraser Valley Bandits	6	4	2	526	484	+42	.667	Semi-finals
3	Hamilton Honey Badgers	6	3	3	521	510	+11	.500	Quarter-finals
4	Ottawa BlackJacks	6	3	3	482	472	+10	.500	Quarter-finals
5	Guelph Nighthawks	6	3	3	472	473	−1	.500	Quarter-finals
6	Niagara River Lions (H)	6	2	4	465	501	−36	.333	Quarter-finals
7	Saskatchewan Rattlers	6	1	5	451	514	−63	.167	

Source: https://www.cebl.ca/standings
(C) Champions; (H) Hosts

=== Results ===
Teams	EDM	FRA	GUE	HAM	NIA	OTT	SAS
Edmonton Stingers	—	—	—	—	—	—	—
Fraser Valley Bandits	113–100	—	—	—	—	—	—
Guelph Nighthawks	71–85	70–84	—	—	—	—	—
Hamilton Honey Badgers	82–88	102–96	97–71	—	—	—	—
Niagara River Lions	86–87	57–70	65–84	97–85	—	—	—
Ottawa BlackJacks	82–89	78–76	71–89	85–69	79–81	—	—
Saskatchewan Rattlers	66–88	77–87	71–87	73–86	96–79	68–87	—

Source: https://www.cebl.ca/result2fiba
Legend: Blue = left column team win; Red = top row team win.

=== Playoffs ===
Quarter-finals; August 6
4	Ottawa	83
5	Guelph	75
3	Hamilton	85
6	Niagara	83

Semi-finals; August 8
1	Edmonton	88
4	Ottawa	75
2	Fraser Valley	76
3	Hamilton	75

Final; August 9
1	Edmonton	90
2	Fraser Valley	73

==== Quarter-finals ====
CBC

August 6
5:00pm

Box score

Hamilton Honey Badgers 85, Niagara River Lions 83
Scoring by quarter: 15–28, 22–13, 31–13, 17–29
Pts: Jean-Victor Mukama 23; Rebs: Jean-Victor Mukama, Kalif Young 8 Asts: Briante Weber 6	Pts: Trae Bell-Haynes 23; Rebs: Ryan Ejim 7 Asts: Trae Bell-Haynes 5

Meridian Centre, St. Catharines, Ontario
Attendance: N/A
Referees: F. Rizzuti, C. Delaney, T. Turnbu

CBC

August 6
7:30pm

Box score

Ottawa BlackJacks 83, Guelph Nighthawks 75
Scoring by quarter: 21–25, 23–12, 17–16, 22–22
Pts: Olivier Hanlan 19; Rebs: Johnny Berhanemeskel, Olivier Hanlan, Jean Emmanuel Pierre-Charles 6 Asts: Olivier Hanlan, Munis Tutu 4	Pts: Tre'darius Mccallum 17; Rebs: Myles Charvis 6 Asts: Myles Charvis 6

Meridian Centre, St. Catharines, Ontario
Attendance: N/A
Referees: T. Turnbull K. Moore V. Bovell

==== Semi-finals ====
CBC

August 8
1:30pm

Box score

Fraser Valley Bandits 76, Hamilton Honey Badgers 75
Scoring by quarter: 16–13, 16–26, 18–25, 26–11
Pts: Malcolm Duvivier 18; Rebs: Malcolm Duvivier 8 Asts: Jahenns Manigat 6	Pts: Jean-Victor Mukama 24; Rebs: Briante Weber 10; Asts: Briante Weber 6

Meridian Centre, St. Catharines, Ontario
Attendance: N/A
Referees: V. Bovell C. Buccella T. Turnbull

CBC

August 8
3:50pm

Box score

Edmonton Stingers 88, Ottawa BlackJacks 75
Scoring by quarter: 25–20, 22–19, 20–18, 21–18
Pts: Mathieu Kamba 26; Rebs: Jordan Baker 10; Asts: Xavier Moon 5	Pts: Olivier Hanlan 17; Rebs: Thomas Scrubb 9 Asts: Johnny Berhanemeskel 7

Meridian Centre, St. Catharines, Ontario
Attendance: N/A
Referees: J. Stiell F. Rizzuti C. Buccella

==== Final ====
CBC

August 9
12:00pm

Box score

Edmonton Stingers 90, Fraser Valley Bandits 73
Scoring by quarter: 15–14, 24–21, 26–21, 25–17
Pts: Xavier Moon 31; Rebs: Travis Daniels 8 Asts: Jordan Baker, Adika Peter-Mcneilly 4	Pts: Junior Cadougan 13; Rebs: Marcus Capers, Oluseyi Ashaolu, Marek Klassen 4 Asts: Junior Cadougan 5

Meridian Centre, St. Catharines, Ontario
Attendance: N/A
Referees: F. Rizzuti V. Bovell T. Turnbull

== Awards ==
- Player of the Year: Xavier Moon, Edmonton Stingers
- Canadian Player of the Year: Jordan Baker, Edmonton Stingers
- U Sports Developmental Player of the Year: Lloyd Pandi, Ottawa BlackJacks
- Defensive Player of the Year: Brianté Weber, Hamilton Honey Badgers
- Referee of the Year: Frank Rizzuti
- Clutch Player of the Year: Brianté Weber, Hamilton Honey Badgers
- Coach of the Year: Jermaine Small, Edmonton Stingers
- CEBL Final MVP: Xavier Moon Edmonton Stingers

=== All-star teams ===
First Team		Pos.	Second Team	
Player	Team	Pos.	Player	Team
Jordan Baker	Edmonton Stingers	F	Olu Ashaolu	Fraser Valley Bandits
Thomas Scrubb	Ottawa BlackJacks	F	Owen Klassen	Hamilton Honey Badgers
Travis Daniels	Edmonton Stingers	F	Tre'Darius McCallum	Guelph Nighthawks
Jean-Victor Mukama	Hamilton Honey Badgers	G	Brianté Weber	Hamilton Honey Badgers
Xavier Moon	Edmonton Stingers	G	Jahenns Manigat	Fraser Valley Bandits

== Statistics ==
=== Individual statistic leaders ===
Category	Player	Team(s)	Statistic
Points per game	Cameron Forte	Fraser Valley Bandits	21.8
Rebounds per game	Jordan Baker	Edmonton Stingers	9.4
Assists per game	Xavier Moon	Edmonton Stingers	4.5
Steals per game	Cameron Forte	Fraser Valley Bandits	2.8
Blocks per game	Travis Daniels	Edmonton Stingers	1.5
FG%	Denzel Taylor	Saskatchewan Rattlers	61.5%
3P%	Kyle Landry	Ottawa BlackJacks	80.0%
