= Brianté Weber =

American basketball player (born 1992)

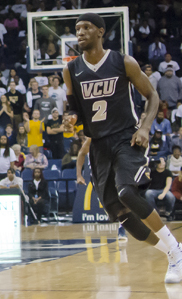
- Weber with the VCU Rams in 2014

No. 2 – Karşıyaka Basket
- Position: Point guard
- League: Basketbol Süper Ligi

Personal information
- Born: December 29, 1992 (age 33) Chesapeake, Virginia, U.S.
- Listed height: 6 ft 2 in (1.88 m)
- Listed weight: 178 lb (81 kg)

Career information
- High school: Great Bridge (Chesapeake, Virginia)
- College: VCU (2011–2015)
- NBA draft: 2015: undrafted
- Playing career: 2015–present

Career history
- 2015–2016: Sioux Falls Skyforce
- 2016: Memphis Grizzlies
- 2016: Miami Heat
- 2016–2017: Sioux Falls Skyforce
- 2017: Golden State Warriors
- 2017: Charlotte Hornets
- 2017–2018: Houston Rockets
- 2017–2018: →Rio Grande Valley Vipers
- 2018: Sioux Falls Skyforce
- 2018: Memphis Grizzlies
- 2018–2019: Sioux Falls Skyforce
- 2019: Olympiacos
- 2019–2020: Levallois Metropolitans
- 2020: Hamilton Honey Badgers
- 2021: BCM Gravelines-Dunkerque
- 2022: Indios de Mayagüez
- 2022: Bnei Herzliya
- 2022–2023: Büyükçekmece
- 2023–2024: Reggiana
- 2024–2025: Kuwait SC
- 2025: Dinamo Sassari
- 2025–2026: Treviso
- 2026–present: Karşıyaka Basket

Career highlights
- Turkish League Defensive Player of the Year (2023); All-CEBL Second Team (2020); All-NBA D-League Second Team (2017); 2× NBA D-League All-Defensive Team (2017, 2018); NBA D-League All-Star (2017); NCAA steals leader (2014); 3× Atlantic 10 Defensive Player of the Year (2013–2015); 3× Atlantic 10 All-Defensive Team (2013–2015); CAA All-Defensive Team (2012)
- Stats at NBA.com
- Stats at Basketball Reference

Brianté Alexander Weber (born December 29, 1992) is an American professional basketball player for Karşıyaka Basket of the Turkish Basketbol Süper Ligi (BSL). He played college basketball for the VCU Rams, and spent three years in the NBA.

== High school career ==
Weber attended Great Bridge High School where he averaged 17 points, eight rebounds, five assists and four steals per game as a senior, earning the All-Southeastern District Defensive Player of the Year award during his junior and senior seasons.

== College career ==
In his college career with the VCU Rams, he was designated to the Atlantic 10 All-Defensive Team on multiple occasions, and also earned the title as the conference's Defensive Player of the Year for three straight seasons. He led the nation in steals through his junior season in 2013–14 with a 3.46 average.

On January 31, 2015, Weber's college career ended when he tore his ACL and MCL in a loss to rival Richmond. Weber was only 12 steals away from becoming the NCAA's all-time career leader.

== Professional career ==
=== Sioux Falls Skyforce (2015–2016) ===
Weber went undrafted in the 2015 NBA draft, likely due to him still recovering from his ACL tear. He later attempted to join the Miami Heat for training camp but was unable to pass his physical due to the knee injury. He ultimately signed with the Heat on October 19, 2015, but was waived five days later.

On November 2, Weber was acquired by the Sioux Falls Skyforce of the NBA Development League as an affiliate player of the Heat. He missed the first month of the 2015–16 season due to the knee injury, making his debut for the Skyforce during the D-League Showcase on January 7, 2016. He slowly built up his confidence and received more game time throughout January, scoring in double figures in five straight games between January 22 and February 3. On February 23, he recorded a triple-double with 11 points, 11 rebounds and 10 assists in a win over the Fort Wayne Mad Ants. He later recorded two more double-doubles, and scored a season-high 26 points on February 27 against the Maine Red Claws.

=== Memphis Grizzlies (2016) ===
On March 11, 2016, Weber signed a 10-day contract with the Memphis Grizzlies. He made his debut for the Grizzlies later that night, recording 10 points, seven assists and five rebounds as the starting point guard in a 121–114 overtime win over the New Orleans Pelicans. On March 16, he had a 12-point performance and started in his fourth straight game, as the Grizzlies lost 114–108 to the Minnesota Timberwolves. Following the conclusion of his 10-day contract, the Grizzlies parted ways with Weber, and on March 21, he was reacquired by Sioux Falls.

=== Miami Heat (2016) ===
On April 10, 2016, Weber signed with the Miami Heat. That night, he made his debut for the Heat in a 118–96 win over the Orlando Magic, recording two points, one rebound and one assist in three minutes. In July 2016, Weber re-joined the Heat for the 2016 NBA Summer League. On October 22, 2016, he was waived by the Heat after appearing in eight preseason games.

=== Sioux Falls Skyforce (2016–2017) ===
On November 1, 2016, Weber was reacquired by the Sioux Falls Skyforce. On December 25, 2016, Weber recorded 24 points, a career-high 16 rebounds and 10 assists in a 96–94 double overtime win against the Northern Arizona Suns. On February 1, 2017, he was named the NBA Development League Player of the Month for games played in January. He led Sioux Falls to a 6–5 record behind averages of 21.5 points, 8.3 assists, 6.6 rebounds and 3.6 steals. He had five double-doubles and two triple-doubles in January, and finished one steal shy of recording the first quadruple-double in NBA D-League history.

=== Golden State Warriors (2017) ===
On February 4, 2017, Weber signed a 10-day contract with the Golden State Warriors. On February 14, 2017, he signed a second 10-day contract with the Warriors. Three days later, he was assigned to the Santa Cruz Warriors to allow him to compete in the 2017 NBA D-League All-Star Game. He was recalled by Golden State on February 21. He parted ways with Golden State following the expiration of his second 10-day contract.

=== Charlotte Hornets (2017) ===
On February 27, 2017, Weber signed a 10-day contract with the Charlotte Hornets. He went on to sign a second 10-day contract with Hornets on March 9, and a multi-year contract on March 19. On July 28, 2017, he was waived by the Hornets.

=== Houston Rockets / Rio Grande Valley Vipers (2017–2018) ===
On August 14, 2017, Weber signed with the Los Angeles Lakers. He was waived on October 14 as one of the team's final preseason roster cuts. On October 24, 2017, the Houston Rockets announced that they had signed Weber to a two-way contract. Under the terms of the deal, Weber will split time between the Rockets and their NBA G League affiliate, the Rio Grande Valley Vipers. He'd be heading off to the G League affiliate team immediately after signing his two-way contract with the team. On January 15, Weber was waived by the Rockets.

=== Sioux Falls Skyforce (2018) ===
On January 22, 2018, Weber was reacquired by the Sioux Falls Skyforce.

=== Memphis Grizzlies (2018) ===
On March 14, 2018, the Memphis Grizzlies had signed Weber to a 10-day contract. Weber was reported not getting offered for second 10-day contract after the original one expired, making him a free agent. On August 22, 2018, Weber joined the Miami Heat on a training camp deal. He was waived on October 13. He then re-joined the Skyforce.

=== Olympiacos (2019) ===
On February 6, 2019, Weber signed with the Greek team Olympiacos of the Euroleague for the rest of the season. On April 13, 2019, Weber was waived by the team.

=== Levallois Metropolitans (2019–2020) ===
On August 26, 2019, he signed one-year deal with Levallois Metropolitans of the LNB Pro A.

=== Hamilton Honey Badgers (2020) ===
On June 17, 2020, Weber signed with the Hamilton Honey Badgers of the Canadian Elite Basketball League (CEBL).

=== BCM Gravelines-Dunkerque (2021) ===
On January 2, 2021, Weber signed with BCM Gravelines of the LNB Pro A.

=== Indios de Mayagüez (2022) ===
On April 4, 2022, Weber signed with Indios de Mayagüez of the Puerto Rican BSN.

=== Bnei Herzliya (2022) ===
On October 23, 2022, he has signed with Bnei Herzliya in the Israeli Basketball Premier League.

=== Büyükçekmece Basketbol (2022–2023) ===
On November 23, 2022, he signed with ONVO Büyükçekmece of the Turkish Basketball Super League (BSL).

=== Dinamo Sassari (2025) ===
On March 16, 2025, Weber signed with Dinamo Sassari of the Lega Basket Serie A (LBA).

=== Treviso Basket (2025–2026) ===
On July 22, 2025, he signed with Treviso Basket of the Lega Basket Serie A (LBA).

=== Karşıyaka Basket (2026–present) ===
On August 12, 2026, he signed with Karşıyaka Basket of the Turkish Basketbol Süper Ligi (BSL).

== NBA career statistics ==
Legend
GP	Games played	GS	Games started	MPG	Minutes per game
FG%	Field goal percentage	3P%	3-point field goal percentage	FT%	Free throw percentage
RPG	Rebounds per game	APG	Assists per game	SPG	Steals per game
BPG	Blocks per game	PPG	Points per game	**Bold**	Career high

=== Regular season ===
Year	Team	GP	GS	MPG	FG%	3P%	FT%	RPG	APG	SPG	BPG	PPG
2015–16	Memphis	6	**4**	**27.7**	.342	.000	.750	**4.0**	**3.3**	**1.5**	**.5**	**4.8**
2015–16	Miami	1	0	3.0	**1.000**	.000	.000	1.0	1.0	.0	.0	2.0
2016–17	Golden State	7	0	6.6	.357	.000	.667	.6	.7	.4	.1	1.7
2016–17	Charlotte	**13**	0	12.2	.435	.143	.692	1.6	1.3	.7	.0	3.8
2017–18	Houston	**13**	0	9.1	.409	**.444**	**1.000**	1.4	1.0	.8	.2	2.0
Career		40	4	12.3	.397	.208	.750	1.7	1.4	.8	.2	3.0

=== Playoffs ===
Year	Team	GP	GS	MPG	FG%	3P%	FT%	RPG	APG	SPG	BPG	PPG
2016	Miami	2	0	3.0	.000	.000	.000	.0	.5	.5	.0	.0
Career		2	0	3.0	.000	.000	.000	.0	.5	.5	.0	.0

== Personal life ==
Weber is the son of LaSandra and Ricky Wingate. He majored in Computer Science while attending VCU.

== See also ==
- List of NCAA Division I men's basketball season steals leaders
- List of NCAA Division I men's basketball career steals leaders
