= Xavier Moon =

American basketball player (born 1995)

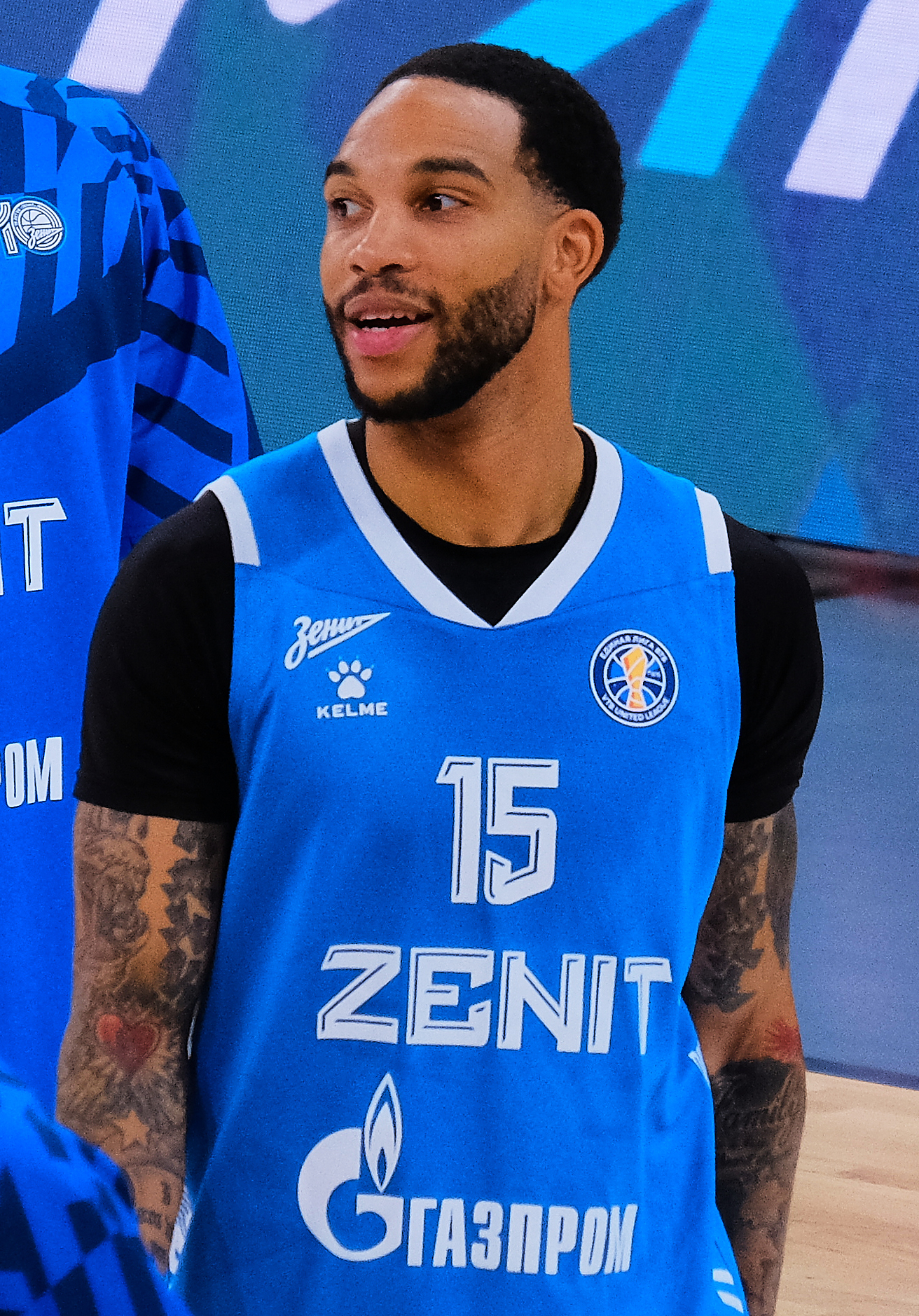
- Moon with Zenit Saint Petersburg in 2024

No. 17 – Maxima Roma
- Position: Point guard / shooting guard
- League: LBA; EuroCup

Personal information
- Born: January 2, 1995 (age 31) Goodwater, Alabama, U.S.
- Listed height: 6 ft 0 in (1.83 m)
- Listed weight: 165 lb (75 kg)

Career information
- High school: Central Coosa (Hanover, Alabama)
- College: Northwest Florida State (2013–2015); Morehead State (2015–2017)
- NBA draft: 2017: undrafted
- Playing career: 2017–present

Career history
- 2017–2018: ALM Évreux
- 2018: Albany Patroons
- 2018–2019: London Lightning
- 2019–2021: Edmonton Stingers
- 2019–2020: London Lightning
- 2020–2021: Maccabi Hod HaSharon
- 2021–2022: Agua Caliente Clippers
- 2021–2022: Los Angeles Clippers
- 2022: →Agua Caliente Clippers
- 2022–2023: Ontario Clippers
- 2023–2024: Los Angeles Clippers
- 2023–2024: →Ontario Clippers
- 2024–2025, 2026: Zenit Saint Petersburg
- 2026: Winnipeg Sea Bears
- 2026–present: Maxima Roma

Career highlights
- All-NBA G League Third Team (2023); 3× CEBL champion (2020, 2021, 2026); 3× CEBL Finals MVP (2020, 2021, 2026); 3× CEBL Player of the Year (2019–2021); 3× First-team All-CEBL (2019–2021); CEBL scoring champion (2021); CEBL steals leader (2021); First-team All-NBL Canada (2020); NAPB Rookie of the Year (2018); First-team All-OVC (2017)
- Stats at NBA.com
- Stats at Basketball Reference

Xavier Moon (born January 2, 1995) is an American professional basketball player for Maxima Roma of the Italian Lega Basket Serie A (LBA) and the EuroCup. He played college basketball for Northwest Florida State and Morehead State. The nephew of former NBA basketball player Jamario Moon, he won CEBL Player of the Year three years in a row from 2019 to 2021 while playing for the Edmonton Stingers.

== High school career ==
Moon grew up in Goodwater, Alabama and began playing organized basketball in seventh grade. He attended Central Coosa High School where he played on the junior varsity team as a freshman before playing three years on varsity. As a senior, he led Alabama in scoring with 35 points per game. In the tournament semifinal, he scored 48 points, followed by 50 points in the championship game. Moon earned Alabama Sports Writers Association All-State team honors and went to the Alabama-Mississippi All-Star game. Moon also played on the football team as a senior as a quarterback. He was lightly recruited, as Itawamba Community College was the first school to offer him a scholarship during his senior season, and Moon ended up signing with Northwest Florida State College.

== College career ==
Moon attended Northwest Florida State College for two years. As a freshman, he averaged 4.6 points per game. He averaged 7.7 points per game as a sophomore. Moon was named Sixth Man of the Year as the Raiders finished 33-2 and won the National Junior College Championship. Moon transferred to Morehead State before his junior season, choosing the Eagles because it felt like home.

He finished second on the team in scoring as a junior at 10.2 points per game and shot 48 percent from the field. Moon recorded the first triple-double in Morehead State history on December 19, 2016, notching 25 points, 11 assists and 10 rebounds against Central Arkansas. He scored a career-high 26 points against Austin Peay on January 19, 2017. As a senior, Moon led Morehead State in scoring with 16.0 points per game and also averaged 4.6 assists and 3.5 rebounds per game. He was named to the First Team All-Ohio Valley Conference. Moon graduated from Morehead State in May 2017 with a bachelor's degree in Exercise Science.

== Professional career ==
=== ALM Évreux (2017–2018) ===
On August 10, 2017, Moon signed his first professional contract with ALM Évreux Basket of the LNB Pro B. After six months, Moon left the team due to issues with the coach and returned home to Alabama.

=== Albany Patroons (2018) ===
His uncle Jamario Moon suggested that he join his team, the Albany Patroons, and Xavier did so after coach Derrick Rowland was impressed with his play. In the Patroon locker room, Xavier became known as "half Moon", in contrast with his uncle, known as "full Moon". Xavier averaged 18 points, 8 rebounds and 6 assists per game and was named North American Premier Basketball rookie of the year.

=== London Lightning (2018–2019) ===
Moon signed with London Lightning of the National Basketball League of Canada on September 7, 2018. He averaged 13.7 points, 4.9 rebounds and 4.1 assists per game in 40 games.

=== Edmonton Stingers (2019–2020) ===
Alex Johnson informed Moon of the formation of the Canadian Elite Basketball League, and he joined the Edmonton Stingers. In his first game on May 11, 2019, he scored 36 points in a 118–105 overtime victory against the Niagara River Lions. Moon averaged 19.3 points and 5.7 assists per game for Edmonton and was named league MVP. He led the team to the semifinals before losing to the eventual champions Saskatchewan Rattlers. Following the season, Moon tried out for Raptors 905 of the NBA G League but was one of the final roster cuts.

=== Return to the Lightning (2019–2020) ===
He re-signed with the Lightning on November 15. On January 4, 2020, he scored 39 points in a 113–97 victory over the KW Titans. Moon averaged 21.5 points, 6.5 rebounds and 5.3 assists per game during the shortened 2019–20 season and was named to the First Team All-NBL Canada.

On June 25, 2020, Moon signed with Wilki Morskie Szczecin of the Polish Basketball League, but didn't play for them.

=== Return to the Stingers (2020) ===
Moon re-joined the Edmonton Stingers for the 2020 CEBL season. He scored 31 points in the championship game, a 90–73 win against the Fraser Valley Bandits, and was named the Final MVP. He also won his second Most Valuable Player award. Moon averaged 19.5 points, 4.5 assists, 4 rebounds and 1.8 steals per game.

=== Maccabi Hod HaSharon (2020–2021) ===
In August 2020 Moon signed with Maccabi Hod HaSharon of the Israeli National League. During his 31 games in the league he averaged 24.5 points, 6.8 rebounds, and 4.4 assists per game.

=== Third stint with the Stingers (2020–2021) ===
After the season overseas, Xavier returned to the Edmonton Stingers of the CEBL for the 2020–2021 season where he continued his MVP reign, winning his 3rd CEBL MVP award, his 2nd CEBL Championship, and his 2nd CEBL Finals MVP Award.

=== Los Angeles / Agua Caliente / Ontario Clippers (2021–2024) ===
On October 27, 2021, Moon signed with the Agua Caliente Clippers. He averaged 12.4 points, 7.3 assists, 4.4 rebounds and 1.4 steals per game in 14 games in the G league.

On December 26, 2021, Moon signed a 10-day contract with the Los Angeles Clippers. Moon scored his first NBA points, and had his NBA debut on December 27, 2021, versus the Brooklyn Nets at Crypto.com Arena. On January 4, 2022, he signed a second 10-day contract with the Clippers and on January 14, they signed him to a third 10-day.

On January 24, 2022, Moon was reacquired and activated by Agua Caliente and on March 26, he signed a two-way contract with the Los Angeles Clippers.

On November 3, 2022, Moon was named to the opening night roster for the Ontario Clippers.

On March 1, 2023, Moon signed a two-way contract with the Los Angeles Clippers and on October 2, he signed a standard contract. However, he was waived on October 21 and joined the Ontario Clippers nine days later. On November 15, he was signed again by Los Angeles on a two-way contract.

=== Zenit Saint Petersburg (2024–2025; 2026) ===
On August 2, 2024, Moon signed with Zenit Saint Petersburg of the VTB United League.

=== Maxima Roma (2026–present) ===
On August 5, 2026, Moon signed a one-year deal with Maxima Roma of the Italian Lega Basket Serie A (LBA).

== Career statistics ==
Legend
GP	Games played	GS	Games started	MPG	Minutes per game
FG%	Field goal percentage	3P%	3-point field goal percentage	FT%	Free throw percentage
RPG	Rebounds per game	APG	Assists per game	SPG	Steals per game
BPG	Blocks per game	PPG	Points per game	**Bold**	Career high

=== NBA ===
Year	Team	GP	GS	MPG	FG%	3P%	FT%	RPG	APG	SPG	BPG	PPG
2021–22	L.A. Clippers	10	0	**13.7**	**.490**	**.357**	**.600**	**1.4**	**2.4**	**.7**	**.3**	**5.8**
2022–23	L.A. Clippers	4	0	4.9	.333	.333	—	.8	1.3	.0	.0	1.8
2023–24	L.A. Clippers	**14**	**1**	8.5	.326	.118	.500	1.3	1.5	.2	.2	2.4
Career		28	1	9.9	.406	.235	.571	1.3	1.8	.4	.2	3.5

== Personal life ==
Moon is the oldest of three children born to Michelle Moon. Michelle's brother Jamario played professional basketball in the NBA. Moon did not find out who his father, Brian Thomas, was until his junior year of high school. On April 20, 2016, his stepfather Elbert Wilson was murdered while mowing his lawn.
