= Edmonton Stingers =

Canadian Elite Basketball League team

- 2026 CEBL season
- Leagues: CEBL
- Founded: 2018
- History: Edmonton Stingers (2018–present)
- Arena: PlayAlberta Court at Edmonton Expo Centre
- Capacity: 4,000
- Location: Edmonton, Alberta
- Team colours: Yellow, blue, white
- President: Jordan Baker
- General manager: Jordan Baker
- Head coach: Jordan Baker
- Ownership: Stingers Entertainment Group
- Championships: 2 (2020, 2021)
- Website: thestingers.ca

The Edmonton Stingers are a Canadian professional basketball team based in Edmonton, Alberta. They compete in the Canadian Elite Basketball League (CEBL) and play their home games at the HIVE arena at the Edmonton Expo Centre. The Stingers' mascot is Buzz, a hornet, inspired by the CF-18 based in Cold Lake.

== History ==
On May 2, 2018, it was announced that Edmonton would be one of the six cities to participate in the Canadian Elite Basketball League, with the team expected to play its inaugural season beginning in May 2019. On June 22, 2018, it was announced that the team would be called the Edmonton Stingers.

The Edmonton Stingers played their inaugural game on May 10, 2019 against the Niagara River Lions, winning 118-105. In their debut season, the Stingers were eliminated in the semifinals.

In the 2020 season, Edmonton won its first CEBL championship after beating the Fraser Valley Bandits in the final, 90–73. Xavier Moon, who scored 30 points, was named Most Valuable Player of the championship game.

In the 2021 season, Edmonton won its second consecutive championship, making them the leagues first back to back champions 101-65 over the Niagara River Lions.

On September 22, 2021 Edmonton announced that they would compete in the 2021–22 BCL Americas. In their debut, the Stingers defeated Real Estelí 84-81 in Managua, Nicaragua.

On April 3, 2024, it was announced that Manjit and Ravinder Minhas, the co-owners of Minhas Craft Brewery, have become partners of the team. Manjit Minhas, the Dragons' Den star, becomes the first female owner in CEBL history.

== Players ==
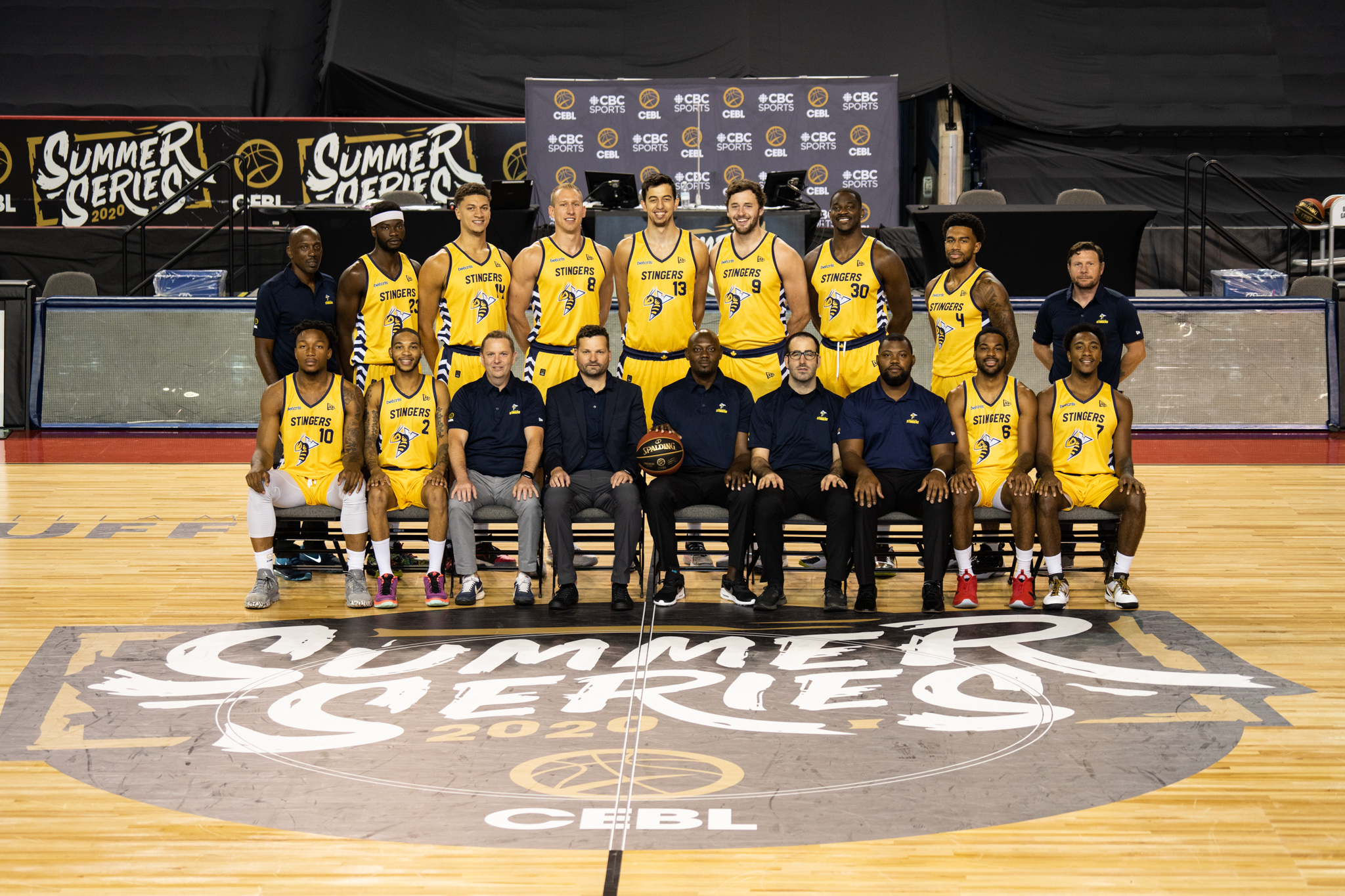
The Stingers team that won the 2020 CEBL championship

=== Current roster ===
Note: Flags indicate national team eligibility at FIBA-sanctioned events. Players may hold other non-FIBA nationalities not displayed.

Edmonton Stingers roster
Players
Coaches

Pos.	No.	Nat.	Name	Ht.	Wt.	Age
G	3	(Canada) (Jamaica)	Anderson, Marcus	6 ft 3 in (1.91 m)	185 lb (84 kg)	29 – 5 April 1997
G	14	(Canada)	Clarke, Brody	6 ft 8 in (2.03 m)	190 lb (86 kg)	30 – 4 June 1996
G	8	(Canada)	Donald, Taye	6 ft 2 in (1.88 m)	180 lb (82 kg)	24 – 19 February 2002
G	6	(Canada)	Peter-McNeilly, Adika	6 ft 3 in (1.91 m)	204 lb (93 kg)	33 – 17 April 1993
F	23	(Canada)	Rhooms, Aaron	6 ft 5 in (1.96 m)	220 lb (100 kg)	24 – 6 April 2002
G	7	(Canada) (Guyana)	Richmond, Ryan	6 ft 1 in (1.85 m)	195 lb (88 kg)	30 – 21 March 1996
G	2	(United States)	Teel, Samage	6 ft 2 in (1.88 m)	185 lb (84 kg)	24 – 29 July 2002

Head coach

- (Canada) Jordan Baker

Assistant coach(es)

- (Canada) Eric Fawcett
- (Canada) George Hoyt
- (Canada) Matt Skinn
- (Canada) Jay Tomlinson

Legend

- (C) Team captain
- Injured

- Roster
- Transactions
Updated: January 1, 2025

== Honours ==
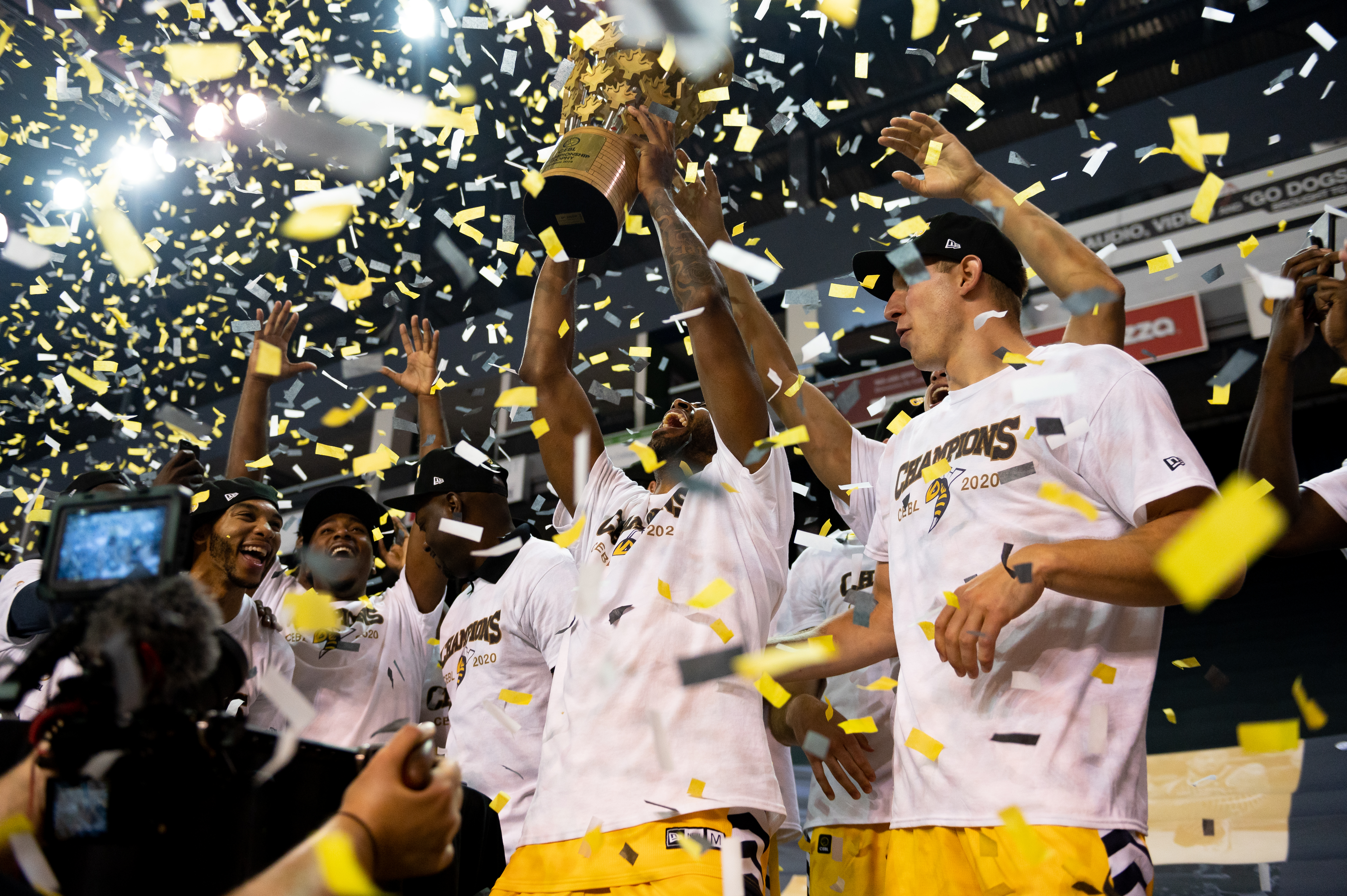
The Stingers celebrating winning the 2020 CEBL title

CEBL Championships

CEBL Championship

Season	Winning Coach
2020	Jermaine Small
2021	Jermaine Small

CEBL Regular Season Champions

Season	W	L	Pct.
2020	5	1	.833
2021	13	1	.930

All CEBL Teams

First All Star Team

Season	Position	Player
2019	Guard	Xavier Moon
2019	Forward	Travis Daniels
2020	Forward	Jordan Baker
2020	Forward	Travis Daniels
2020	Guard	Xavier Moon
2021	Forward	Jordan Baker
2021	Guard	Xavier Moon
2025	Guard	Sean East II

Second All Star Team

Season	Position	Player
2019	Forward	Jordan Baker
2021	Forward	Marlon Johnson Jr
2022	Forward	Jordan Baker

All Canadian Team

Season	Position	Player	Hometown
2021	Forward	Jordan Baker	Edmonton, Alberta
2022	Forward	Jordan Baker	Edmonton, Alberta
2024	Forward	Brody Clarke	Toronto, Ontario
2025	Forward	Keon Ambrose-Hylton	Toronto, Ontario

Individual Awards

Player of The Year

Season	Player
2019	Xavier Moon
2020	Xavier Moon
2021	Xavier Moon

CEBL Final MVP

Season	Player
2020	Xavier Moon
2021	Xavier Moon

Canadian Player of The Year

Season	Player	Hometown
2020	Jordan Baker	Edmonton, Alberta

U Sports Developmental Player of The Year

Season	Player	University Team
2019	Brody Clarke	University of Alberta Golden Bears

Coach of The Year Award

Season	Coach
2020	Jermaine Small
2021	Jermaine Small

6th Man of The Year Award

Season	Player
2021	Adika Peter-McNeilly

Community Ambassadors Award

Season	Player
2019	Xavier Moon

== Season-by-season record ==
League	Season	Coach	Regular season				Post season			
League	Season	Coach	Won	Lost	Win%	Finish	Won	Lost	Win%	Result
CEBL	2019	Jermaine Small	14	6	.700	2nd	0	1	.000	Lost semi-finals
CEBL	2020	Jermaine Small	5	1	.833	1st	2	0	1.000	Won CEBL Championship
CEBL	2021	Jermaine Small	13	1	.929	1st	2	0	1.000	Won CEBL Championship
CEBL	2022	Jermaine Small	10	10	.500	6th	0	1	.000	Lost play in round
CEBL	2023	Jordan Baker	9	11	.450	3rd West	1	1	.500	Lost Quarter-final
CEBL	2024	Jordan Baker	13	7	.650	2nd West	0	1	.000	Lost Quarter-final
CEBL	2025	Jordan Baker	15	9	.625	3rd West	0	1	.000	Lost Play in game
CEBL	2026	Jordan Baker	9	15	.375	4th West	0	1	.000	Lost quarterfinal
Totals			88	60	.595	—	5	6	.455	

== Notable players ==
Note: Flags indicate national team eligibility at FIBA-sanctioned events. Players may hold other non-FIBA nationalities not displayed.

Criteria

To appear in this section a player must have either:

- Set a club record or won an individual award while at the club
- Played at least one official international match for their national team at any time
- Played at least one official NBA match at any time.

- (Canada) Murphy Burnatowski
- (United States) Mikh McKinney
- (United States) Trahson Burrell
- (Lithuania) Martynas Varnas
- (United States) Xavier Moon
