= Niagara River Lions =

Basketball team in St. Catharines, Canada

- 2026 CEBL season
- Leagues: CEBL
- Founded: 2015
- History: Niagara River Lions (2015–present)
- Arena: Meridian Centre
- Capacity: 4,030
- Location: St. Catharines, Ontario
- Team colours: Green, black, grey
- President: Michelle Biskup
- Head coach: Kimbal Mackenzie
- Ownership: Richard Petko, Michael Skrtich, Darren Peters
- Championships: 2 (2024, 2025)
- Conference titles: 2 (2024, 2025)
- Website: riverlions.ca
Home	Away	Third

The Niagara River Lions are a Canadian professional basketball team based in St. Catharines, Ontario, Canada that competes in the Canadian Elite Basketball League. From 2015 to 2018, they were members of the National Basketball League of Canada. The River Lions play their home games at the Meridian Centre in downtown St. Catharines. Niagara is led by head coach Kimbal Mackenzie.

== History ==
In February 2014, the Niagara Basketball Group started the application process to get a local team. Over a year later, the NBL Canada announced that they would hold a press conference on the morning of April 8, 2015, regarding the expansion team. The group also held an online contest in which fans had the opportunity to make suggestions as to what the team's nickname should be. On May 14, 2015, the NBL held a Board of Governors' meeting, in which it was approved and confirmed that Niagara would compete in the 2015–16 season. At a press conference on May 28, 2015, it was announced that the team would be called the "Niagara River Lions," a nickname inspired by the Niagara Region's coat of arms, which depicts the same animal. Ken Murray, a successful Canadian Interuniversity Sport (CIS) coach, came out of retirement to claim the head coaching and general manager (GM) position. However, during their inaugural season, Murray was fired from the team on February 20, 2016, and was replaced by assistant coach Grâce Lokole. Lokole would step down from the head coach position during the next season on March 11, 2017. He was replaced by local Niagara College head coach Keith Vassell on an interim basis while Lokole stayed on as an assistant. Joe Raso would be named the head coach for the 2017–18 season.

In 2017, River Lions' owner Richard Petko became one of the investors of a new basketball league called Canadian Elite Basketball League (CEBL). On June 8, 2018, the River Lions announced that the franchise had moved to the CEBL after three seasons in the National Basketball League of Canada. The River Lions won the 2024 CEBL Championship, their first in franchise history. The following season the River Lions successfully defended their title, winning their second championship over the Calgary Surge 79-73.

== Mascot ==
For their first season, the River Lions announced that their mascot would be Dunkin the River Lion. Dunkin performs during every River Lions home game and attends events throughout the Niagara Region.

== Players ==
=== Current roster ===
Note: Flags indicate national team eligibility at FIBA-sanctioned events. Players may hold other non-FIBA nationalities not displayed.

Niagara River Lions roster
Players
Coaches

Pos.	No.	Nat.	Name	Ht.	Wt.	Age
F/C	8	(Canada)	Hylton, Nigel	6 ft 8 in (2.03 m)	225 lb (102 kg)	23 – 2 June 2003
G	1	(Canada) (United Kingdom)	Mackenzie, Kimbal (C)	6 ft 0 in (1.83 m)	195 lb (88 kg)	30 – 16 September 1996
F	3	(United States)	Davis, A. J.	6 ft 9 in (2.06 m)	215 lb (98 kg)	31 – 15 March 1995
G	4	(United States)	Ahmad, Khalil	6 ft 4 in (1.93 m)	215 lb (98 kg)	29 – 24 December 1996
F	8	(Canada)	Ekiyor, Eddie	6 ft 9 in (2.06 m)	185 lb (84 kg)	29 – 3 May 1997
F	13	(Canada)	Cayo, Nathan	6 ft 7 in (2.01 m)	185 lb (84 kg)	28 – 27 October 1997
G	14	(Canada)	Vreeken, Connor	6 ft 5 in (1.96 m)	185 lb (84 kg)	26 – 25 September 2000
G/F	15	(Canada)	James, Gatluak (U)	6 ft 6 in (1.98 m)	185 lb (84 kg)	25 – 12 April 2001
F	22	(Canada)	Lufile, Elijah	6 ft 7 in (2.01 m)	185 lb (84 kg)	33 – 7 November 1992
F	23	(Canada)	Boucard, Guillaume	6 ft 6 in (1.98 m)	185 lb (84 kg)	36 – 16 March 1990

Head coach

- (Canada) Victor Raso

Legend

- (C) Team captain
- (I) Inactive
- (U) Current U Sports Athlete
- Injured

- Roster
- Transactions
Updated: February 10, 2026

== Honours ==
- CEBL

Top regular Season team (2): 2019, 2023
Regular Season Eastern Conference Winners (3): 2023, 2024, 2025
Eastern Conference champions (2): 2024, 2025
Champions (2): 2024, 2025

== Season-by-season record ==
League	Season	Coach	Regular season				Postseason			
League	Season	Coach	Won	Lost	Win %	Finish	Won	Lost	Win %	Result
NBLC	2015–16	Ken Murray; Grâce Lokole	16	24	.400	3rd Central	0	3	.000	Lost div. semi-finals
NBLC	2016–17	Grâce Lokole; Keith Vassell	14	26	.350	5th Central	did not qualify			
NBLC	2017–18	Joe Raso	17	23	.425	4th Central	1	3	.250	Lost div. semi-finals
CEBL
CEBL	2019	Victor Raso	15	5	.750	1st	0	1	.000	Lost semi-finals
CEBL	2020	Victor Raso	2	4	.333	6th	0	1	.000	Lost quarter-finals
CEBL	2021	Victor Raso	10	4	.714	2nd	1	1	.500	Lost finals
CEBL	2022	Victor Raso	13	7	.650	2nd	1	1	.500	Lost semi-finals
CEBL	2023	Victor Raso	13	7	.650	1st East	0	1	.000	Lost semi-finals
CEBL	2024	Victor Raso	14	6	.700	1st East	3	0	1.000	Won CEBL Championship
CEBL	2025	Victor Raso	14	10	.583	1st East	2	0	1.000	Won CEBL Championship
CEBL	2026	Kimbal Mackenzie	10	14	.417	4th East	1	1	.500	Lost semifinals
NBLC totals			47	73	.392	—	1	6	.143	
CEBL totals			91	57	.615	—	8	6	.571	

== Notable players ==
- (United States) Khalil Ahmad
- (United States) Javin DeLaurier
- (France) Tidjan Keita
- (United States) Stephen Maxwell
- (Greece) (Canada) Elijah Mitrou-Long
- (United States) Xavier Moon
- (United States) Xavier Sneed
