= All-CEBL Team =

The All-CEBL Team is an honour given out at the end of each Canadian Elite Basketball League (CEBL) season, honouring the ten best players in the league.

== Teams ==
^	Denotes players who are still active in the CEBL
*	Elected to the Naismith Memorial Basketball Hall of Fame
Player (X)	Denotes the number of times the player has been selected
**Player** **(in bold text)**	Indicates the player who won the CEBL Most Valuable Player in the same year

Season	First team		Second team		Ref.
Season	Players	Teams	Players	Teams	Ref.
2019	Samuel Muldrow	Niagara River Lions	Marlon Johnson	Saskatchewan Rattlers	
2019	Guillaume Boucard	Niagara River Lions	Jordan Baker	Edmonton Stingers	
2019	Travis Daniels	Edmonton Stingers	Travion Dawson	Saskatchewan Rattlers	
2019	Ricky Tarrant, Jr.	Hamilton Honey Badgers	Marek Klassen	Fraser Valley Bandits	
2019	**Xavier Moon**	Edmonton Stingers	Trae Bell-Haynes	Niagara River Lions	
2020	Jordan Baker (2)	Edmonton Stingers	Olu Ashaolu	Fraser Valley Bandits	
2020	Thomas Scrubb	Ottawa BlackJacks	Owen Klassen	Hamilton Honey Badgers	
2020	Travis Daniels (2)	Edmonton Stingers	Tre'Darius McCallum	Guelph Nighthawks	
2020	Jean-Victor Mukama	Hamilton Honey Badgers	Brianté Weber	Hamilton Honey Badgers	
2020	**Xavier Moon** (2)	Edmonton Stingers	Jahenns Manigat	Fraser Valley Bandits	
2021	Jordan Baker (3)	Edmonton Stingers	Marlon Johnson (2)	Edmonton Stingers	
2021	Nick Ward	Ottawa BlackJacks	Brandon Gilbeck	Fraser Valley Bandits	
2021	Javin DeLaurier	Niagara River Lions	Ahmed Hill	Guelph Nighthawks	
2021	**Xavier Moon** (3)	Edmonton Stingers	Cat Barber	Guelph Nighthawks	
2021	Lindell Wigginton	Hamilton Honey Badgers	Alex Campbell	Fraser Valley Bandits	
2022	**Khalil Ahmad**	Niagara River Lions	Shane Gibson	Fraser Valley Bandits	
2022	Tony Carr	Saskatchewan Rattlers	Cat Barber (2)	Guelph Nighthawks	
2022	Jalen Harris	Scarborough Shooting Stars	Brandon Sampson	Newfoundland Growlers	
2022	Caleb Agada	Hamilton Honey Badgers	Christian Vital	Hamilton Honey Badgers	
2022	Isiaha Mike	Scarborough Shooting Stars	Jordan Baker (4)	Edmonton Stingers	
2023	Simisola Shittu	Calgary Surge	Deng Adel	Ottawa BlackJacks	
2023	**Teddy Allen**	Winnipeg Sea Bears	Kadre Gray	Ottawa BlackJacks	
2023	Justin Wright-Foreman	Saskatchewan Rattlers	Christian Vital (2)	Hamilton Honey Badgers	
2023	Cat Barber (3)	Scarborough Shooting Stars	Ahmed Hill (2)	Montreal Alliance	
2023	Khalil Ahmad (2)	Niagara River Lions	E. J. Anosike	Winnipeg Sea Bears	
2024	Nick Ward (2)	Vancouver Bandits	Chris Smith	Montreal Alliance	
2024	Khalil Ahmad (3)	Niagara River Lions	Teddy Allen (2)	Winnipeg Sea Bears / Saskatchewan Rattlers	
2024	Cat Barber (4)	Scarborough Shooting Stars	Jahvon Blair	Niagara River Lions	
2024	**Tazé Moore**	Vancouver Bandits	Jalen Harris (2)	Saskatchewan Rattlers	
2024	Justin Wright-Foreman (2)	Winnipeg Sea Bears	Koby McEwen	Vancouver Bandits	
2025	Greg Brown III	Calgary Surge	Tyrese Samuel	Vancouver Bandits	
2025	**Mitch Creek**	Vancouver Bandits	Simi Shittu (2)	Winnipeg Sea Bears	
2025	Sean East II	Edmonton Stingers	Khalil Ahmad (4)	Niagara River Lions	
2025	Javonte Smart	Ottawa Blackjacks	Jameer Nelson Jr.	Calgary Surge	
2025	Donovan Williams	Scarborough Shooting Stars	Terquavion Smith	Scarborough Shooting Stars	

== Most selections ==
The following table only lists players with at least two total selections.

*	Denotes players inducted to the Naismith Memorial Basketball Hall of Fame
^	Denotes players who are still active

Player	Total	First team	Second team	MVP	Seasons
Jordan Baker^	4	2	2	–	4
Cat Barber^	4	2	2	–	4
Xavier Moon^	3	3	0	3	3
Khalil Ahmad^	3	3	0	1	3
Teddy Allen^	2	1	1	1	2
Travis Daniels^	2	2	0	–	2
Nick Ward^	2	2	0	–	2
Justin Wright-Foreman^	2	2	0	–	2
Jalen Harris^	2	1	1	–	2
Ahmed Hill^	2	0	2	–	2
Marlon Johnson^	2	0	2	–	2
Christian Vital^	2	0	2	–	2
