= 2022 CEBL–U Sports Draft =

Canadian Elite Basketball League draft

General information
- Sport: Basketball
- Date(s): April 19, 2022

Overview
- 20 total selections in 2 rounds
- League: Canadian Elite Basketball League
- Teams: 10
- First selection: David Muenkat, Scarborough Shooting Stars

The 2022 CEBL–U Sports Draft is the Fourth CEBL Draft, being revealed on April 19. 10 Canadian Elite Basketball League (CEBL) teams will select 20 athletes in total.

== Format ==
the draft order for the first round is determine by how the teams finished in the 2021 CEBL season and the 3 new expansion team order of joining the league, followed by Saskatchewan Rattlers finishing last place last season so they get fourth overall. A "snake draft" was used, with the order reversing in even-numbered rounds, and the original order in odd-numbered rounds. The draft order for the first round was determined as follows:

1. Scarborough Shooting Stars
2. Montreal Alliance
3. Newfoundland Growlers
4. Saskatchewan Rattlers
5. Ottawa Blackjacks
6. Guelph Nighthawks
7. Fraser Valley Bandits
8. Hamilton Honey Badgers
9. Niagara River Lions
10. Edmonton Stingers

== Eligibility ==
Same thing as in 2021, Players may completed their university eligibility in 2020-21, or they may be returning to their university team in the fall and be classified within the CEBL’s U SPORTS Developmental player program. They must qualify as Canadian, and they must have completed at least one full year of eligibility at their U SPORTS institution. Each CEBL club must have at least one U SPORTS player on its 10-man active roster at all times.

== Player selection ==
=== Round 1 ===
Pick	Team	Player	Hometown	School team
1	Scarborough Shooting Stars	David Muenkat	Brampton, ON	St.Francis Xavier University
2	Montreal Alliance	Alain Louis	Montreal, QC	Carleton University
3	Newfoundland Growlers	Cole Long	St.John, NL	Memorial University
4	Saskatchewan Rattlers	Anthony Tsegakele	Gatineau, QC	Brandon University
5	Ottawa Blackjacks	Nervens Demosthene	Terrebonne, QC	University of Saskatchewan
6	Guelph Nighthawks	Elijah Miller	Rexdale, ON	University of PEI
7	Fraser Valley Bandits	Thomas Kennedy	Windsor, ON	University of Windsor
8	Hamilton Honey Badgers	Keevan Veinot	Port Williams, NS	Dalhousie University
9	Niagara River Lions	Lloyd Pandi	Ottawa, ON	Carleton University
10	Edmonton Stingers	Patrick Vandervelden	Abbotsford, BC	Mount Royal University

=== Round 2 ===
Pick	Team	Player	Hometown	School team
11	Edmonton Stingers	Somto Dimanochie	Lagos, Nigeria	York University
12	Niagara River Lions	Isiah Bujdoso	Hamilton, ON	Brock university
13	Hamilton Honey Badgers	Michael Okafor	Toronto, ON	Lakehead University
14	Fraser Valley Bandits	Sukhman Sandhu	Surrey, BC	University of British Columbia
15	Guelph Nighthawks	Ibrahima Doumbouya	Calgary, AB	University of New Brunswick
16	Ottawa Blackjacks	Guillaume Pepin	Montreal, QC	University of Ottawa
17	Saskatchewan Rattlers	Ben Hillis	Regina, SK	University of Regina
18	Newfoundland Growlers	Mason Bourcier	Kelowna, BC	Trinity Western University
19	Montreal Alliance	Marc-Andre Fortin	Sainte-Marie, QC	University of Laval
20	Scarborough Shooting Stars	Aaron Rhooms	Toronto, ON	Ryerson University
