= Vincent Lavandier =

French basketball coach

Personal information
- Born: February 10, 1972 (age 54)
- Coaching career: 2000–present

Career history

Coaching
- 2000–2001: Poissy Yvelines (assistant)
- 2002–2003: Paris Basket Racing (assistant)
- 2003–2006: Élan Chalon (assistant)
- 2006–2007: Trappes
- 2007–2008: Lagardere Paris
- 2009–2012: JL Bourg Basket (assistant)
- 2012–2017: Angers
- 2017–2018: Tarbes-Lourdes
- 2019–2020: Glasgow Rocks
- 2020–2021: US Avignon-Pontet
- 2022: Montreal Alliance

Vincent Lavandier (born February 10, 1972) is a French basketball coach. He was most recently the head coach of the Montreal Alliance of the Canadian Elite Basketball League (CEBL).

== Career ==
Lavandier spent much of his early coaching career in his homeland, learning as an assistant under Jacques Monclar at Paris Basket Racing and Grégor Beugnot at Élan Chalon.

He took his first full head coaching role with Trappes in the NM1 league in 2006. He spent time as head coach of Lagardere Paris in Women's National 1 and then three years as an assistant coach at JL Bourg Basket. Lavandier took over at Angers in 2012, and led them to the NM1 title in 2014 and promotion to LNB Pro B. In June 2017, Lavandier became head coach of Union Tarbes-Lourdes.

In February 2019, Lavandier was appointed interim head coach of the Glasgow Rocks, for the remainder of the 2018–19 season. In April 2019, he signed a deal to remain head coach until the end of the 2020–21 season. He was voted Coach of the Year for the 2019–2020 season by the Basketball Journalists Association.

On March 8, 2022, Lavandier signed as head coach of the Montreal Alliance, an expansion team in the Canadian Elite Basketball League (CEBL). On January 23, 2023, the Alliance announced that he would not return after posting a 4–16 record in 2022.
