= Olu Ashaolu =

Nigerian-Canadian basketball player

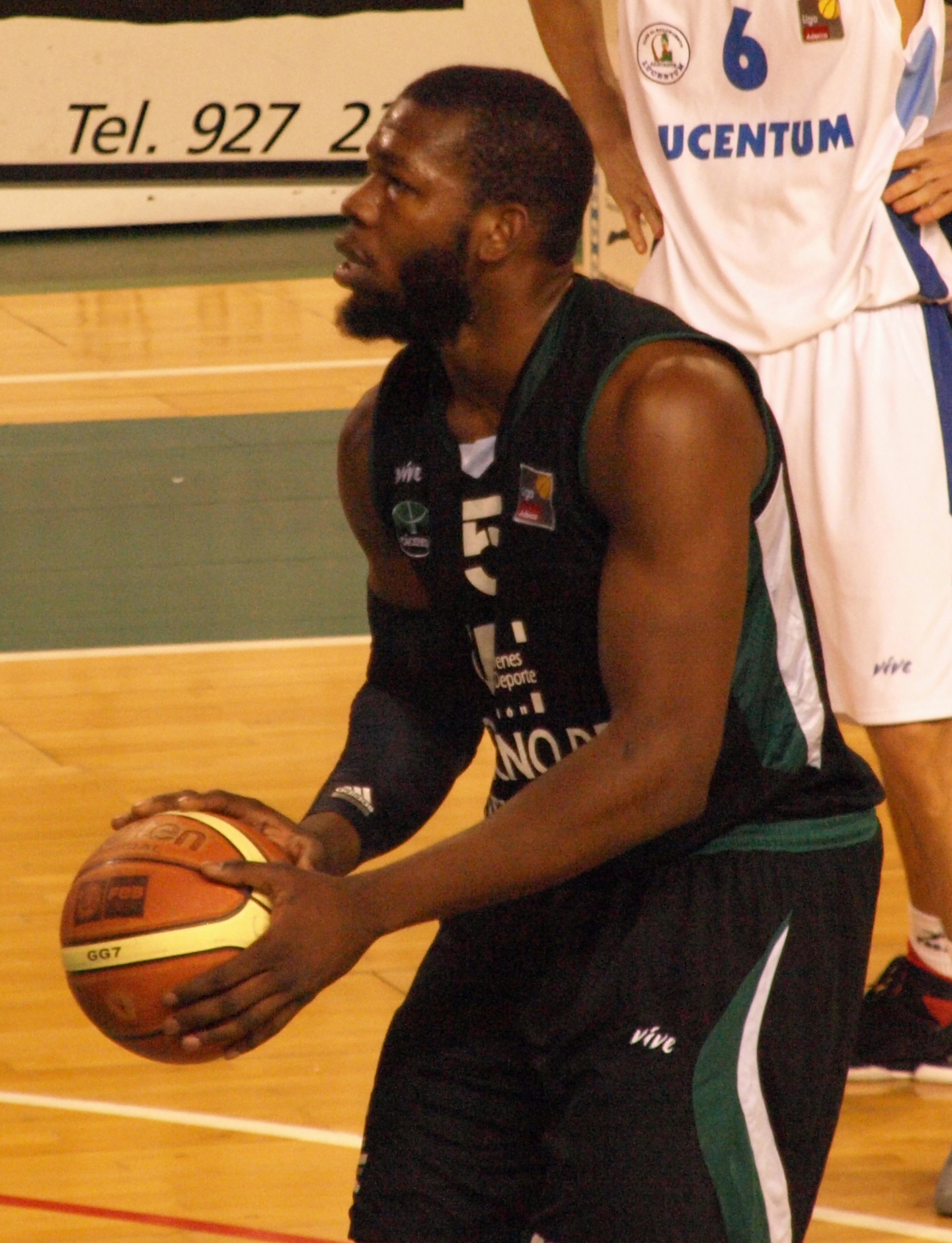
- Ashaolu shoots a free throw in 2013

Mexico City Capitanes
- Position: Assistant coach
- League: NBA G League

Personal information
- Born: April 18, 1988 (age 38) Lagos, Nigeria
- Listed height: 6 ft 7 in (2.01 m)
- Listed weight: 220 lb (100 kg)

Career information
- High school: Christian Life Center Academy (Humble, Texas)
- College: Louisiana Tech (2008–2011); Oregon (2011–2012)
- NBA draft: 2012: undrafted
- Playing career: 2012–2023

Career history
- 2012–2013: Cáceres Ciudad del Baloncesto
- 2013–2014: ALM Évreux Basket
- 2014–2015: Hamamatsu Higashimikawa Phoenix
- 2015–2016: Osaka Evessa
- 2016–2017: San-en NeoPhoenix
- 2017–2018: Sendai 89ers
- 2018: NLEX Road Warriors
- 2019: St. John's Edge
- 2019: NLEX Road Warriors
- 2019: Goyang Orion Orions
- 2020: St. John's Edge
- 2020: Fraser Valley Bandits
- 2021: Niagara River Lions
- 2021–2022: Alaska Aces
- 2022: Niagara River Lions
- 2022: Guelph Nighthawks
- 2023: Olimpia

Career highlights
- B. League champion (2015); WAC All-Defensive Team (2011); All-CEBL Second Team (2020)
- Stats at Basketball Reference

Oluseyi Ashaolu (born April 18, 1988) is a former Nigerian-Canadian basketball player who is currently an assistant coach for the Mexico City Capitanes of the NBA G League. A 6 ft 7 in (2.01 m) power forward, Ashaolu played college basketball at Louisiana Tech and Oregon.

== College career ==
Ashaolu lived in Brampton until 2004, when he made the move to Atlanta for grade 9, to play high school basketball stateside.

Ashaolu began his collegiate career at Louisiana Tech, where he averaged 5.3 points and 4.3 rebounds per game as a freshman. He improved those numbers to 10.7 points and 8.1 rebounds per game as a sophomore. Ashaolu averaged 14.2 points and 9.4 rebounds per game as a junior. He earned his bachelor's degree in business administration in 2011 and decided he did not want to be part of the rebuilding effort under rookie head coach Michael White.

On May 24, 2011, Ashaolu announced his transfer to Oregon, choosing the Ducks over Texas, San Diego State and Xavier. Ashaolu took advantage of the graduate transfer rule and did not have to sit out the season as a redshirt. One of the reasons he joined Oregon was because his AAU teammate, Devoe Joseph, was on the squad. Ashaolu was relegated to a bench role as a senior, but did not mind the decreased minutes. He averaged 9.2 points and 5.2 rebounds per game in his only season at Oregon.

== Professional career ==
Following the close of his college career, Ashaolu was not drafted in the 2012 NBA draft. However, he did sign with the Milwaukee Bucks in the 2012 Summer League. On August 22, 2012 he signed with Cáceres Ciudad del Baloncesto of the Spanish league. He was picked up by Hamamatsu Higashimikawa Phoenix of Japan's bj league in 2014. After helping Hamamatsu capture a title in May 2015, Ashaolu joined Osaka Evessa.

Ashaolu signed with the Phoenix, now renamed San-en NeoPhoenix, in August 2016. The following season, he moved to the Sendai 89ers. Ashaolu averaged 18.5 points and 7.6 rebounds per game but was hampered by a knee injury in November 2017.

He signed with the NLEX Road Warriors of the Philippine Basketball Association (PBA) in June 2018. Despite having a 70-percent tear on his knee, Ashaolu played through pain and scored 27 points against NorthPort Batang Pier. In August 2018, NLEX signed Aaron Fuller as his replacement to allow time for his injury to heal.

On June 28, 2019, Olu Ashaolu debuts for the Road Warriors as he replaced Tony Mitchell as the team's import. Ashaolu recorded 26 points, 13 rebounds and 6 assists as he led the Road Warriors in their second win of the Commissioner's Cup as they beat the Rain O'Shine Elasto Painters.

On June 30, 2020, Ashaolu signed with the Fraser Valley Bandits of the Canadian Elite Basketball League (CEBL). On May 17, 2021, Ashaolu signed with Niagara River Lions of the CEBL.

In November 2021, Ashaolu signed with the Alaska Aces for his third stint in the PBA. On March 15, 2022, he was replaced by Mark St. Fort as the team's import for the quarterfinals of the 2021 PBA Governors' Cup as chronic injuries bothered Ashaolu for the whole conference.
