= Cat Barber =

American basketball player (born 1994)

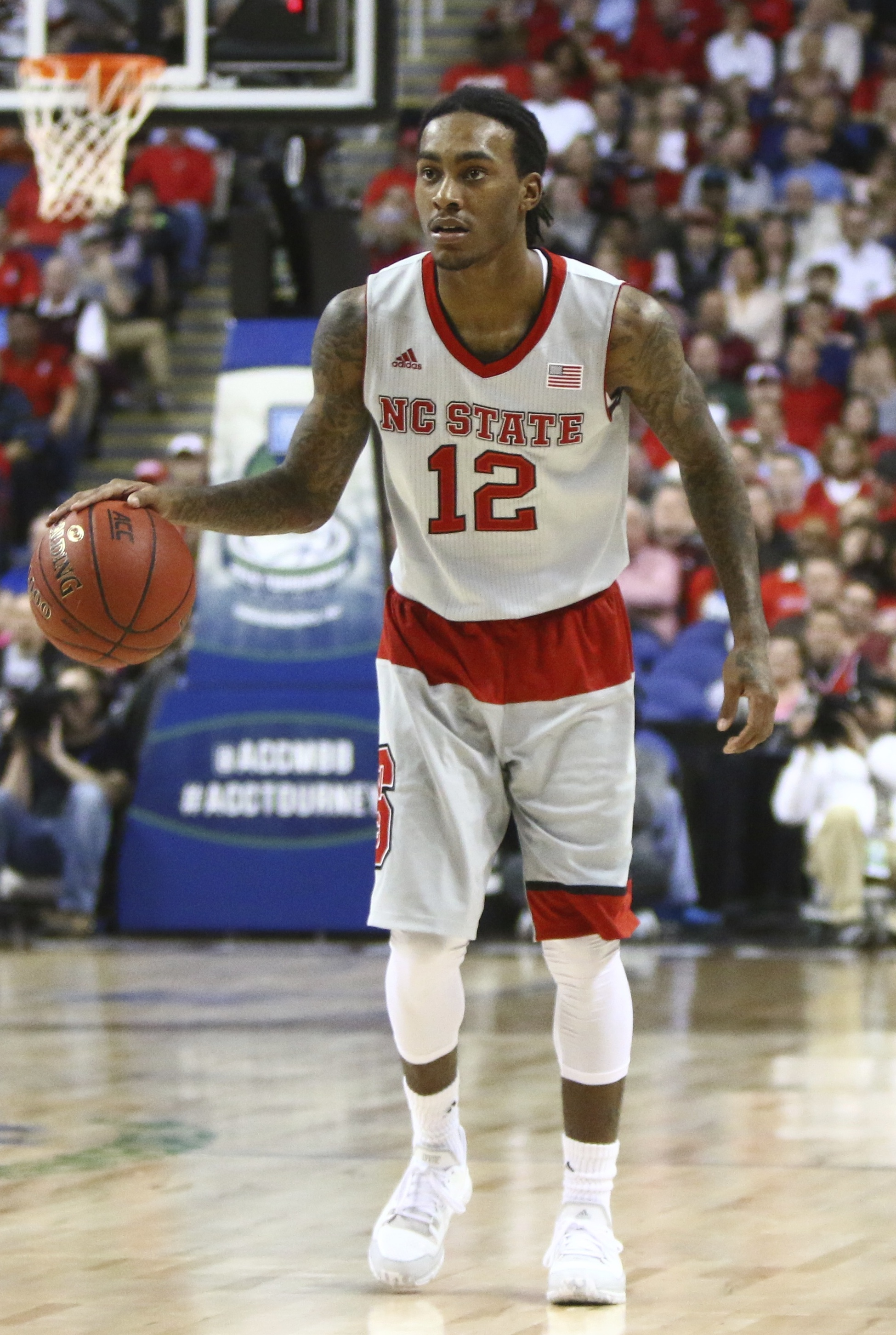
- Barber with NC State in March 2015

No. 12 – Scarborough Shooting Stars
- Position: Point guard
- League: CEBL

Personal information
- Born: July 25, 1994 (age 32) Hampton, Virginia, U.S.
- Listed height: 6 ft 1 in (1.85 m)
- Listed weight: 174 lb (79 kg)

Career information
- High school: Hampton (Hampton, Virginia)
- College: NC State (2013–2016)
- NBA draft: 2016: undrafted
- Playing career: 2016–present

Career history
- 2016–2017: Delaware 87ers
- 2017: Greensboro Swarm
- 2017: New Basket Brindisi
- 2017–2018: Greensboro Swarm
- 2018: Ironi Nahariya
- 2018–2019: Greensboro Swarm
- 2019: Erie BayHawks
- 2019: Ironi Nahariya
- 2019–2020: College Park Skyhawks
- 2021: Mitteldeutscher BC
- 2021–2022: Guelph Nighthawks
- 2021–2022: College Park Skyhawks
- 2021–2022: Atlanta Hawks
- 2022: BC Budivelnyk
- 2022–2023: College Park Skyhawks
- 2023: Scarborough Shooting Stars
- 2023–2024: Porto
- 2024: Cibona
- 2024–2025: Sporting CP
- 2025–2026: El Calor de Cancún
- 2026–present: Scarborough Shooting Stars

Career highlights
- All-NBA G League Second Team (2022); CEBL champion (2023); 2× All-CEBL First Team (2023, 2024); 2× All-CEBL Second Team (2021, 2022); Portuguese Cup winner (2024); Portuguese Cup MVP (2024); AP Honorable Mention All-American (2016); First-team All-ACC (2016); McDonald's All-American (2013)
- Stats at NBA.com
- Stats at Basketball Reference

Anthony Ynique "Cat" Barber (born July 25, 1994) is an American professional basketball player for the Scarborough Shooting Stars of the Canadian Elite Basketball League (CEBL). He played three seasons of college basketball for NC State, where he earned first-team All-Atlantic Coast Conference (ACC) honors as a junior.

== High school career ==
Barber grew up in the same area of Virginia as National Basketball Association (NBA) star Allen Iverson. Barber has even drawn comparisons to the former superstar in both his appearance and style of play. A standout player for Hampton High School, Barber averaged 21.0 points per game in his sophomore campaign. In 2011, Barber was named to the All-Eastern Region's first team in the Peninsula District as the only underclassman. Barber led his school to a 27–6 record and a Virginia State Title in 2012. During his championship junior season, Barber averaged 21.3 points per game, earning him Class AAA Player of the Year honors. His senior year solidified his legacy at Hampton, posting a 22–6 record and averaging 20.2 points per game. He finished his high school career with 2,097 points total. During his high school years, Barber played AAU basketball under Boo Williams.

Barber was selected to the McDonald's All American Game. The 2013 McDonald's All-American Boys Game was held in Chicago's United Center where Barber recorded 11 points, 4 assists and 2 steals. Barber was also able to capture a bronze medal in the 2012 Nike Global Challenge.

== College career ==
Barber was ranked fourth among point guards in the 2013 recruiting class, and was a highly coveted recruit. On September 15, 2012, Barber signed with North Carolina State University to play for the N.C. State basketball team after being recruited by assistant coach, Rob Moxley. In his recruitment process, Barber also looked at attending the University of Kansas or the University of Alabama.

In 2015–16, Barber was named first-team All-ACC and led the conference with averages of 24 points and 39 minutes played per game. He was also named to the 35-man midseason watchlist for the Naismith Trophy. Over the course of his three seasons with the Wolfpack, he appeared in 104 games and posted averages of 15 points, four assists and three rebounds in 31 minutes per game. Barber finished his college career ranking 13th all time in NC State history in scoring with 1,507 points in just 3 years.

On March 22, 2016, Barber declared for the NBA draft, forgoing his final year of college eligibility.

== Professional career ==
=== Delaware 87ers (2016–2017) ===
After going undrafted in the 2016 NBA draft, Barber joined the New Orleans Pelicans for the 2016 NBA Summer League. On August 31, 2016, he signed with the Philadelphia 76ers, but was waived on October 24 after appearing in two preseason games. Five days later, he was acquired by the Delaware 87ers of the NBA Development League as an affiliate player of the 76ers.

=== Greensboro Swarm (2017) ===
On February 3, 2017, Barber was traded to the Charlotte Hornets affiliate Greensboro Swarm in exchange for guard Aaron Harrison.

=== New Basket Brindisi (2017) ===
On July 26, 2017, Barber signed with New Basket Brindisi in Italy. On November 21, 2017, he parted ways with Brindisi after appearing in seven games.

=== Return to the Swarm (2017–2018) ===
On November 29, 2017, Barber returned to the Greensboro Swarm for a second stint. In 29 games played for the Swarm, Barber averaged 16.9 points, 4.5 assists, 3.5 rebounds and 1.1 steals per game.

=== Ironi Nahariya (2018) ===
On March 27, 2018, Barber signed with the Israeli team Ironi Nahariya for the rest of the season. On April 25, 2018, Barber recorded a season-high 25 points, shooting 5-of-8 from three-point range, along with five assists in a 77–81 loss to Hapoel Gilboa Galil.

=== Third stint with the Swarm (2018–2019) ===
For the 2018–19 season, Barber re-joined the Greensboro Swarm.

=== Erie BayHawks (2019) ===
On February 21, 2019, Barber was traded to the Erie BayHawks for John Gillon.

=== Return to Ironi Nahariya (2019) ===
On March 28, 2019, Barber returned to Ironi Nahariya for a second stint, signing for the rest of the season. On April 15, 2019, Barber recorded a career-high 36 points, shooting 11-of-22 from the field, along with three rebounds and two assists in a 93–96 overtime loss to Hapoel Gilboa Galil. In 10 games played for Nahariya, he averaged 16.9 points, 2.8 rebounds and 2.5 assists per game.

=== College Park Skyhawks (2019–2020) ===
On November 8, 2019, Barber returned to the G League to play for the College Park Skyhawks. He was named G League player of the week on February 3, 2020, after averaging 26 points, 6.7 rebounds, and 5.3 assists per game in three games. He posted 29 points, six rebounds, six assists and two steals in a loss to the Raptors 905 on March 10.

=== Mitteldeutscher BC (2021) ===
On February 18, 2021, Barber signed with Mitteldeutscher BC of the German Basketball Bundesliga.

=== Guelph Nighthawks (2021) ===
On April 15, 2021, Barber signed with the Guelph Nighthawks of the Canadian Elite Basketball League.

=== Atlanta Hawks / Return to College Park (2021–2022) ===
In October 2021, Barber rejoined the College Park Skyhawks. In 14 games, averaged 13.1 points, a team-high 5.8 assists and 3.9 rebounds in 26.3 minutes per game (.445 FG%, .367 3FG%, .759 FT%).

On December 25, 2021, Barber signed a 10-day contract with the Atlanta Hawks. and was re-acquired by College Park on January 4.

=== Return to the Nighthawks (2022) ===
On May 12, 2022, Barber was reacquired by the Guelph Nighthawks.

=== Budivelnyk (2022) ===
On August 11, 2022, Barber signed with BC Budivelnyk of the European North Basketball League.

=== Third stint with College Park (2022–2023) ===
On December 27, 2022, Barber was reacquired by the College Park Skyhawks.

=== Scarborough Shooting Stars (2023) ===
On April 11, 2023, Barber signed with the Scarborough Shooting Stars. Barber would finish the season as the CEBL's all-time leading scorer with 1108 career points while also winning the CEBL Championship with the Shooting Stars that season.

=== Porto (2023–2024) ===
On July 16, 2023, Barber signed with Porto of the Liga Portuguesa de Basquetebol.

=== Return to Scarborough (2024) ===
On April 24, 2024, Barber re-signed with the Shooting Stars, but due to his overseas commitments, he would only be able to rejoin the team on June 21, 2024. On July 13, 2024, Barber scored the last 24 points for the Shooting Stars in a 103–92 win over the Edmonton Stingers to set a new CEBL record for most consecutive points scored for a team in a game.

=== Cibona (2024) ===
On September 6, 2024, Barber signed with Cibona of the Croatian League and the ABA League.

On October 30, 2024, Barber signed with the San Diego Clippers, but was waived on November 8.

=== Sporting CP (2024–present) ===
On November 28, 2024, Barber signed with Sporting CP of the Liga Portuguesa de Basquetebol.

=== Fourth stint with Scarborough (2026) ===
On June 21, 2026, Barber re-signed with the Scarborough Shooting Stars.

== Personal life ==
The son of Pamela Barber, he has an older sister and a daughter. He majored in social work.

Barber's older sister, Pam, is credited with giving him the moniker "Cat" due to his quick and agile movements as a child.

== Career statistics ==
Legend
GP	Games played	MPG	Minutes per game	FG%	Field goal percentage
3P%	3-point field goal percentage	FT%	Free throw percentage	RPG	Rebounds per game
APG	Assists per game	SPG	Steals per game	BPG	Blocks per game
PPG	Points per game	**Bold**	Career high		Led the league

=== NBA ===
Year	Team	GP	GS	MPG	FG%	3P%	FT%	RPG	APG	SPG	BPG	PPG
2021–22	Atlanta	3	0	4.3	.000	—	.000	1.0	1.0	.0	.0	.0
Career		3	0	4.3	.000	—	.000	1.0	1.0	.0	.0	.0

=== College ===
Year	Team	GP	GS	MPG	FG%	3P%	FT%	RPG	APG	SPG	BPG	PPG
2013–14	NC State	**36**	18	24.2	.401	.261	.696	2.0	3.5	.6	.0	8.5
2014–15	NC State	35	**33**	31.7	**.439**	**.380**	.733	3.3	3.7	**.8**	.0	12.1
2015–16	NC State	33	**33**	**38.7**	.434	.361	**.865**	**4.6**	**4.5**	.6	**.1**	**23.5**
Career		104	84	31.3	.428	.347	.793	3.3	3.9	.7	.0	14.5
