= Jermaine Small =

Canadian basketball coach (born 1982)

Montreal Alliance
- Position: Head coach
- League: CEBL

Personal information
- Born: 16 December 1982 (age 43) Toronto, Ontario, Canada

Career information
- High school: Eastern High School of Commerce (Toronto)
- College: Vanier College; Houghton College

Career history

Coaching
- 2011-2015: Ryerson University (assistant)
- 2015-2019: Queen's University at Kingston (assistant)
- 2019-2022: Edmonton Stingers
- 2020-2023: University of Lethbridge Pronghorns
- 2025-present: Montreal Alliance

Career highlights
- CEBL Champion (2020, 2021)

Jermaine Small (born 16 December 1982) is a Canadian professional basketball coach who currently serves as the head coach of the Montreal Alliance.

== Early life ==
Small is a native of Toronto, Canada and attended Milne Valley Public School in Toronto. He later played basketball at Eastern High School of Commerce in Toronto.

After his graduation from Eastern High School of Commerce, Small attended Vanier College in Montreal and transferred after one year to Houghton College in New York state. He graduated with a degree in Physical Education from Houghton College.

== Coaching career ==
In 2011, Small began coaching in Canadian universities. First starting as an assistant coach at Ryerson University.

He later became an assistant coach for four years at Queen's University at Kingston.

In 2019, Small became head coach of the Edmonton Stingers, taking over just eight games into the team's inaugural season.

In March 2020, Small was named as head coach of the University of Lethbridge Pronghorns, becoming the 13th coach in program history. He was later replaced by Kenny Otieno in March 2023, who became the team’s 14th coach all-time.

Small was head coach of the Edmonton Stingers for four seasons, leading the Stingers to championships in 2020 and 2021 and three consecutive finals appearances. Additionally, he was named Coach of the Year while with the Stingers. With the Stingers, he coached and mentored three-time CEBL Most Valuable Player Xavier Moon, who later reached the NBA. He represented the Stingers as general manager and head coach of the Stingers team at the Basketball Champions League of Americas after their 2021 CEBL championship. In November 2022, it was announced that Small would not be returning to the Stingers in order to focus full-time on his head coaching role at the University of Lethbridge.

On 27 January 2025, Small was hired as the new head coach of the Montreal Alliance.

On 18 May 2025, the Alliance opened the season with a 88–66 win over the Brampton Honey Badgers, giving Small his first win as Montreal's head coach.

In 2026, Small entered his second season as head coach of the Alliance.
