= 2019 CEBL season =

Canadian professional basketball season

- League: Canadian Elite Basketball League
- Sport: Basketball
- Duration: Season: May 9 – August 15; Playoffs: August 24–25
- Games: 20
- Teams: 6

Draft
- Top draft pick: Joel Friesen
- Picked by: Fraser Valley Bandits

Regular season
- Top seed: Niagara River Lions
- Season MVP: Xavier Moon (Edmonton)
- Top scorer: Tavrion Dawson (Saskatchewan)

Championship Weekend
- Venue: SaskTel Centre; Saskatoon, Saskatchewan
- Champions: Saskatchewan Rattlers (1st Title)
- Runners-up: Hamilton Honey Badgers
- Finals MVP: Alex Campbell (Saskatchewan)

Seasons
- 2020 →

The 2019 CEBL season was the inaugural season of the Canadian Elite Basketball League. It included six teams: Saskatchewan, Fraser Valley, Edmonton, Hamilton, Niagara, and Guelph. The regular season ran from May 9, 2019 to August 15, 2019, and the Championship Weekend took place on August 24 and 25, 2019, hosted in Saskatoon, Saskatchewan. On August 25, the Saskatchewan Rattlers won the CEBL's first ever Championship after beating the Hamilton Honey Badgers.

== Teams ==
2019 Canadian Elite Basketball League
| Team | City | Arena | Capacity |
| Edmonton Stingers | Edmonton, Alberta | Edmonton Expo Centre | 4,000 |
| Fraser Valley Bandits | Abbotsford, British Columbia | Abbotsford Centre | 7,046 |
| Guelph Nighthawks | Guelph, Ontario | Sleeman Centre | 4,715 |
| Hamilton Honey Badgers | Hamilton, Ontario | FirstOntario Centre | 17,383 |
| Niagara River Lions | St. Catharines, Ontario | Meridian Centre | 4,030 |
| Saskatchewan Rattlers | Saskatoon, Saskatchewan | SaskTel Centre | 15,100 |

=== Map of teams ===
CEBL Teams

== Regular season ==
| Pos | Team | Pld | W | L | PCT | GB | Qualification |
|---|---|---|---|---|---|---|---|
| 1 | Niagara River Lions | 20 | 15 | 5 | .750 | +5 | Championship Weekend (Note: The Saskatchewan Rattlers and the top 3 remaining teams qualify for Championship Weekend.) |
| 2 | Edmonton Stingers | 20 | 14 | 6 | .700 | +4 | Championship Weekend |
| 3 | Saskatchewan Rattlers (C, H) | 20 | 11 | 9 | .550 | +1 | Championship Weekend |
| 4 | Hamilton Honey Badgers | 20 | 10 | 10 | .500 | — | Championship Weekend |
| 5 | Guelph Nighthawks | 20 | 6 | 14 | .300 | 4 | |
| 6 | Fraser Valley Bandits | 20 | 4 | 16 | .200 | 6 | |

Updated to match(es) played on final. Source: CEBL
(C) Champions; (H) Championship Weekend host

=== Results ===
| Home \ Away | EDM | FRA | GUE | HAM | NIA | SAS | EDM | FRA | GUE | HAM | NIA | SAS |
|---|---|---|---|---|---|---|---|---|---|---|---|---|
| Edmonton Stingers | — | 93–88 | 82–80 | 87–90 | 118–105 | 93–84 | — | 108–104 | 110–91 | 102–92 | 105–99 | 81–85 |
| Fraser Valley Bandits | 95–104 | — | 103–106 | 88–102 | 94–104 | 81–93 | 85–95 | — | 85–72 | 98–75 | 82–95 | 79–91 |
| Guelph Nighthawks | 89–99 | 95–94 | — | 103–104 | 85–93 | 110–130 | 84–99 | 92–86 | — | 115–131 | 87–96 | 86–98 |
| Hamilton Honey Badgers | 107–83 | 106–99 | 102–96 | — | 107–95 | 77–91 | 103–105 | 82–100 | 118–99 | — | 94–108 | 79–100 |
| Niagara River Lions | 108–66 | 108–87 | 112–109 | 107–96 | — | 94–83 | 98–105 | 81–70 | 90–101 | 108–96 | — | 97–89 |
| Saskatchewan Rattlers | 69–62 | 89–101 | 75–93 | 113–95 | 97–99 | — | 74–73 | 83–73 | 115–125 | 96–102 | 91–108 | — |

Source: USBasket.com
Legend: Blue = home team win; Red = away team win.

== Championship Weekend ==
Semi-finals; August 24
1 | Niagara | 103
4 | Hamilton | 104
2 | Edmonton | 83
3 | Saskatchewan | 85

Final; August 25
4 | Hamilton | 83
3 | Saskatchewan | 94

=== Semi-finals ===
CBC, CEBL.TV

August 24
1:00 pm

Box score

Edmonton Stingers 83, Saskatchewan Rattlers 85
Scoring by quarter: 17–20, 32–21, 19–17, 17–25
| Pts: Grandy Glaze 17; Rebs: Travis Daniels 13; Asts: Moon, Baker, Glaze 5 each | Pts: Marlon Johnson 17; Rebs: Posthumus, Keith 8 each Asts: Alex Campbell 4 |

SaskTel Centre, Saskatoon, Saskatchewan
Attendance: 2,163
Referees: Frank Rizzuti, Tanner Cervo, Greg Spagnoli

CBC, CEBL.TV

August 24
3:30 pm

Box score

Niagara River Lions 103, Hamilton Honey Badgers 104
Scoring by quarter: 34–34, 20–21, 27-25, 22–24
| Pts: Ryan Anderson 26; Rebs: Yohanny Dalembert 11; Asts: Pinson, Johnson 5 each | Pts: Xavier Rathan-Mayes 28; Rebs: Mike Fraser 13; Asts: Rathan-Mayes 11 |

SaskTel Centre, Saskatoon, Saskatchewan
Attendance: 2,163
Referees: Karen Lasiuk, Neil Donnelly, Troy Turnbull

=== Final ===
CBC, CEBL.TV

August 25
4:00 pm

Box score

Hamilton Honey Badgers 83, Saskatchewan Rattlers 94
Scoring by quarter: 23-21, 18-27, 22-25, 20-21
| Pts: Rathan-Mayes 24; Rebs: Rathan-Mayes 11; Asts: Rathan-Mayes 5 | Pts: Campbell 20; Rebs: Ejim 12; Asts: Webster-Chan, Ejim 4 each |

SaskTel Centre, Saskatoon, Saskatchewan
Attendance: 3,119
Referees: Frank Rizzuti, Karen Lasuik, Tanner Cervo

== Awards ==
- Player of the year: Xavier Moon, Edmonton Stingers
- Canadian Player of the Year: Guillaume Boucard, Niagara River Lions
- U Sports Developmental Player of the Year: Brody Clarke, Edmonton Stingers
- Defensive Player of the Year: Samuel Muldrow, Niagara River Lions
- Referee award: David Hersche
- Community Ambassadors Awards: Abednego Lufile, Guelph Nighthawks, Jelane Pryce, Saskatchewan Rattlers, Xavier Moon, Edmonton Stingers, Ryan Anderson, Niagara River Lions, Matt Marshall Hamilton Honey Badgers, Marek Klassen Fraser Valley Bandits
- Coach of the Year: Victor Raso Niagara River Lions
- CEBL Finals MVP: Alex Campbell Saskatchewan Rattlers

=== All-star teams ===
| First Team | | Pos. | Second Team | |
| Player | Team | Pos. | Player | Team |
|---|---|---|---|---|
| Samuel Muldrow | Niagara River Lions | C | Marlon Johnson | Saskatchewan Rattlers |
| Guillaume Boucard | Niagara River Lions | F | Jordan Baker | Edmonton Stingers |
| Travis Daniels | Edmonton Stingers | F | Travion Dawson | Saskatchewan Rattlers |
| Ricky Tarrant, Jr. | Hamilton Honey Badgers | G | Marek Klassen | Fraser Valley Bandits |
| Xavier Moon | Edmonton Stingers | G | Trae Bell-Haynes | Niagara River Lions |

== Statistics ==
=== Individual statistic leaders ===
| Category | Player | Team(s) | Statistic |
|---|---|---|---|
| Points per game | Travion Dawson | Saskatchewan Rattlers | 20.1 |
| Rebounds per game | Jordan Baker | Edmonton Stingers | 10.4 |
| Assists per game | Marek Klassen | Fraser Valley Bandits | 7.2 |
| Steals per game | Xavier Moon | Edmonton Stingers | 2.2 |
| Blocks per game | Ezekiel Marshall | Guelph Nighthawks | 2.0 |
| FG% | Yohanny Dalembert | Niagara River Lions | 66.4% |
| 3P% | Connor Wood | Guelph Nighthawks | 45.7% |
