= Elijah Miller (basketball) =

Canadian basketball player

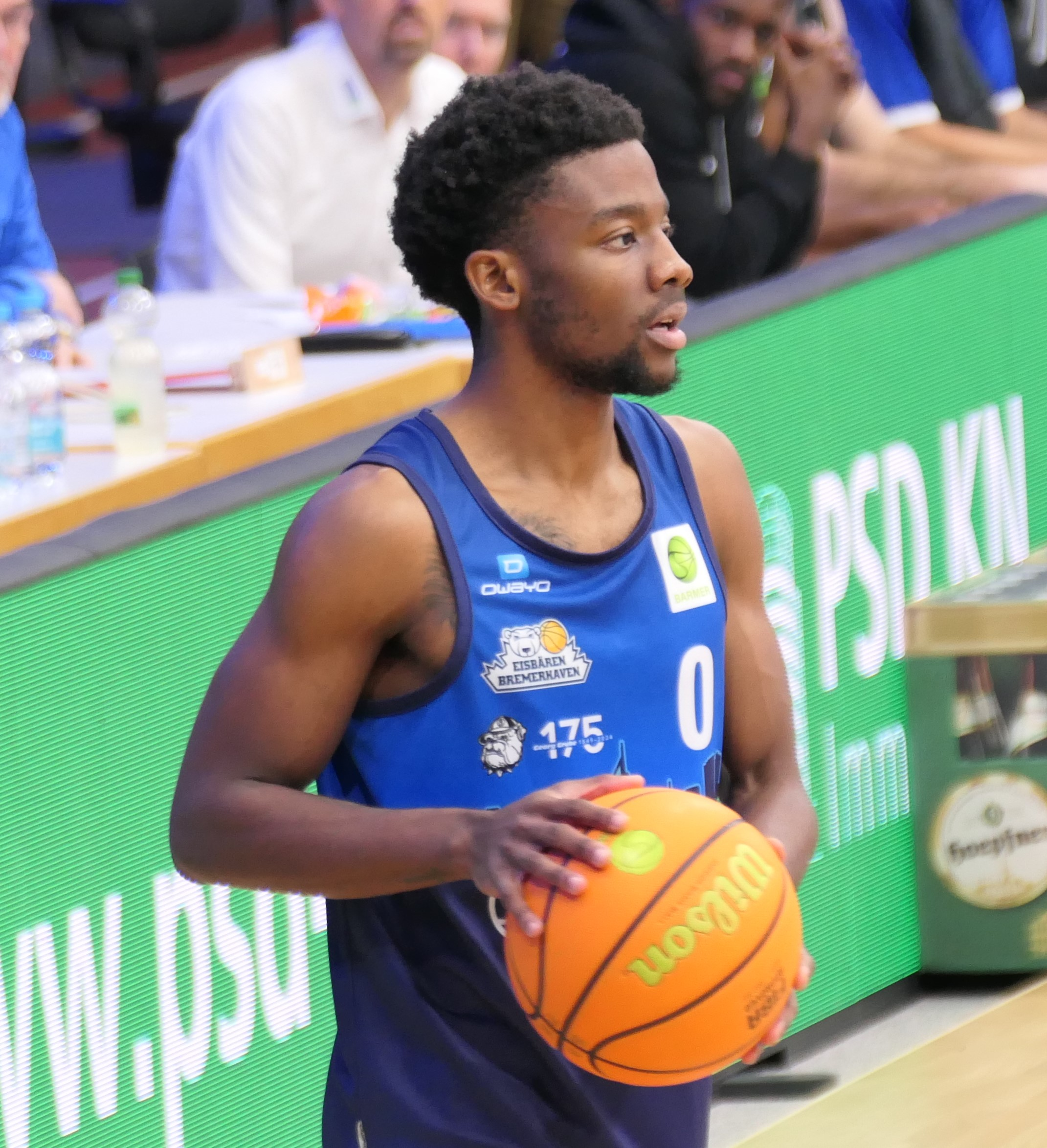
- Miller with Bremerhaven in 2024

No. 0 – CSM Târgu Mureș
- Position: Point guard
- League: Liga Națională

Personal information
- Born: 10 June 1997 (age 29) Etobicoke, Canada
- Listed height: 6 ft 0 in (1.83 m)

Career information
- College: UPEI (2019–2023)
- Playing career: 2022–present

Career history
- 2022: Guelph Nighthawks
- 2023–2024: Edmonton Stingers
- 2024–2026: Eisbären Bremerhaven
- 2026–present: CSM Târgu Mureș

Elijah Jahi Miller is a Canadian professional basketball player for the CSM Târgu Mureș of the Liga Națională. He played college basketball for the UPEI Panthers, and he plays as a point guard.

== Early life ==
Elijah Miller is originally from Rexdale, a suburb of Toronto.

== Professional career ==
In the 2023-24 season with the Edmonton Stingers in the Canadian Elite Basketball League (CEBL), he and his team reached the final tournament where they reached quarterfinals against Calgary Surge. He averaged 8.8 points, 2.8 rebounds, 0.9 steals and 4.3 assists per game.

In August 2024, he joined Eisbären Bremerhaven of the German ProA.

== Accomplishments ==
In July 2024, he set a new CEBL record with 10 successful 3-pointers on 12 attempts against the Saskatchewan Rattlers.

== Playing style ==
According to Bremerhaven’s 2024 head coach Steven Esterkamp, Miller’s strengths are his selfless playmaking ability alongside his defense.
