= Travis Daniels (basketball) =

American basketball player (born 1992)

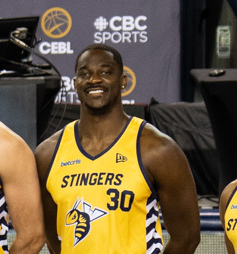
- Daniels in 2020

Personal information
- Born: January 25, 1992 (age 34) Eutaw, Alabama
- Listed height: 6 ft 8 in (2.03 m)
- Listed weight: 225 lb (102 kg)

Career information
- High school: Russellville (Russellville, Alabama)
- College: Shelton State CC (2012–2014); Mississippi State (2014–2016)
- NBA draft: 2016: undrafted
- Playing career: 2016–present
- Position: Small forward / power forward

Career history
- 2016: Phoenix Galați
- 2016–2017: Balkan Botevgrad
- 2017: Leones de Santo Domingo
- 2017–2019: Rethymno Cretan Kings
- 2019: Edmonton Stingers
- 2019–2020: Kolossos Rodou
- 2020: Edmonton Stingers
- 2020–2021: Keravnos
- 2021: Saskatchewan Rattlers
- 2021: Iraklis Thessaloniki
- 2022: Edmonton Stingers
- 2022–2023: Gladiators Trier
- 2023–2024: Résidence
- 2026: Gambusinos de Fresnillo

Career highlights
- CEBL champion (2020); 2× All-CEBL First Team (2019, 2020); CEBL All-Star (2019); Bulgarian Cup MVP (2017)

Travis Daniels (born January 25, 1992) is an American professional basketball player. He played college basketball for Shelton State CC and Mississippi State. He has played professionally in Canada, the Dominican Republic, Romania, Bulgaria, Cyprus and Greece.

== High school career ==
As a senior at Russellville Daniels averaged 10.7 points and 7.7 rebounds. He led his team to a 24–10 record and won the Region 5A-1 championship before losing in the Elite 8 in the AhSAA Class 5A playoffs. He was also named honorable mention for Class 5A by the Alabama Sports Writers' Association and was tabbed to the Willis Valley Shootout and Regional All-Tournament teams.

== College career ==
Daniels played college basketball for the Shelton State Community College from 2012 to 2014 and for Mississippi State from 2014 to 2016.

== Professional career ==
After going undrafted in the 2016 NBA draft, Daniels joined Phoenix Galați of the Liga Națională. On November, he left Phoenix Galați and joined Balkan Botevgrad of the Bulgarian league. He was voted as the Bulgarian Cup MVP. On May 21, 2017, he joined Leones de Santo Domingo until the end of the season.

On August 2, 2017, Daniels joined Rethymno Cretan Kings of the Greek Basket League. During his first season with the club, he averaged 8.8 points and 5 rebounds per game. He made his best appearance with Rethymno against Lavrio, having 18 points 7 rebounds and 1 assist. On June 22, 2018, he renewed his contract until 2019.

After a brief stint in Canada for the Edmonton Stingers, Daniels returned to Greece and signed with Kolossos Rodou on August 8, 2019. Daniels averaged 6.1 points and 5.1 rebounds per game in 19 games before the season was suspended due to the COVID-19 pandemic. He returned to the Stingers for its second season. Daniels averaged 12.6 points, 5.3 rebounds, 1.1 assists and 1.5 blocks per game with Edmonton. On September 29, 2020, he signed with Keravnos of the Cypriot league.

Daniels joined Saskatchewan Rattlers of the Canadian Elite Basketball League in 2021. In 14 games, he averaged 11.1 points, 6.3 rebounds, and 1.4 assists per game. On October 5, 2021, Daniels signed with Iraklis of the Greek Basket League.

On October 8, 2022, he signed with Gladiators Trier of the German ProA.
