= Marek Klassen =

Canadian basketball player

Free Agent
- Position: Point guard

Personal information
- Born: June 11, 1992 (age 34) Vancouver, British Columbia, Canada
- Listed height: 6 ft 1 in (1.85 m)
- Listed weight: 185 lb (84 kg)

Career information
- High school: Yale Secondary School (Abbotsford, British Columbia)
- College: Point Loma Nazarene (2010–2015)
- NBA draft: 2015: undrafted
- Playing career: 2015–present

Career history
- 2015–2016: CSU Sibiu
- 2016: Leeds Force
- 2016–2017: Worcester Wolves
- 2017–2018: İTÜ
- 2018–2019: SOCAR Petkim
- 2019: Fraser Valley Bandits
- 2019–2020: Erie Bayhawks
- 2020–2021: Kyiv-Basket
- 2021–2022: Czarni Słupsk
- 2022: ERA Nymburk
- 2022–2023: Prometey
- 2023: Limoges CSP
- 2023: Vancouver Bandits
- 2023–2024: Karditsa
- 2024–2025: Śląsk Wrocław
- 2025: ESSM Le Portel

Marek Klassen (born June 11, 1992) is a Canadian professional basketball player who last played for ESSM Le Portel of the LNB Pro A. He played college basketball for Point Loma Nazarene.

== Highschool career ==
Klassen attended Yale Secondary School from 2007–2010. He won two provincial championships with the Yale Lions (2008-2010). In his senior year in 2010 the Yale Lions won the British Columbia provincial championship. Klassen averaged 33 points per game and was named MVP of the tournament, final game MVP, and Player of the Year in British Columbia. Upon graduation he ranked as a top 5 Canadian point guard.

== College career ==
Klassen started every game of his college career including 31 starts as a freshman leading to the Freshman of the Year award for the Pacific West Conference. As a senior at Point Loma in 2014-15 Klassen averaged 12.67 points, 3.4 rebounds and 3.6 assists in 27.8 minutes in 29 appearances. Other notable accomplishments include Klassen shooting a career 43% from 3 point range, being named as a two sport NCAA All-American (Basketball and Track and Field) and NCAA Academic All-American. During his senior year Klassen enrolled in the Point Loma one year MBA program to complete his masters in business before starting his professional career.

== Professional career ==
In 2015 Klassen began his professional career with CSU Sibiu in the Liga Națională. He stayed with CSU Sibiu until January 2016 when he moved to Leeds Force of the British Basketball League. His influence on and off the court helped the Force to make the Playoffs for the first time. Averaging 17.7 points 5.8 rebounds 8.1 assists 2.3 steals per game he led the league in assists, steals, fouls drawn, 5th in points per game and was named to the BBL team of the year.

Following his campaign in Leeds, Klassen joined the Worcester Wolves a top performing club in the British Basketball League during the summer of 2016. Klassen was made Captain of the Wolves. It was a successful season in which the Wolves made it to the BBL Cup Final and BBL Championship Semi-final falling eventually to the Newcastle Eagles by 2 points on aggregate score. Klassen led the team and league in assists averaging 12.3 points, 4.1 rebounds, 6.3 assists per game.

Klassen next transitioned to the Turkish Basketball First League where he signed with İstanbul Teknik Üniversitesi B.K. in August 2017. A successful season in which Klassen averaged 15.12 points, 5.58 rebounds, 6.58 assists per game. He played in Istanbul for the duration of the 2017–2018 season. He finished leading his team in assists and top 3 in the Turkish Basketball league standings.

Returning for his second season in the Turkish Basketball First League Klassen signed with Aliağa Petkim for the 2018–2019 season. He helped the team reach the league quarterfinals and semi-finals of the Turkish Cup. Klassen averaged 11.5 points and 5.5 assists while shooting 42% from 3 point range. He helped his team to a semi-final appearance and finished top 3 in the Turkish Basketball League in assists.

After finishing in early June in Turkey, Klassen returned home to Canada to play in the CEBL. A newly minted FIBA league. He was drafted 12th overall in the inaugural 2019 CEBL Entry Draft to the Fraser Valley Bandits. Klassen was an all star with the Bandits during the summer season that lasted until late August 2019. He finished the season as CEBL assist leader and set the record for most assists in a game at 15.

Klassen signed his next contract with the Erie Bayhawks of the NBA G League in November 2019. He only stayed in the G League for a limited time as he was tabbed by Kyiv-Basket in early January 2020. He is currently averaging 12 points and 8 assists, good enough to lead the league in assists. He has helped the team qualify for the semi-finals of the Ukrainian Cup, and the top 8 of FIBA Europe Cup.

On June 25, 2021, he has signed with Czarni Słupsk of the PLK.

On October 12, 2022, he signed with ERA Nymburk of the National Basketball League.

On December 28, 2022, he signed with Prometey of the Latvian-Estonian Basketball League.

On February 27, 2023, he signed with Limoges CSP of the LNB Pro A.

On August 7, 2023, Klassen signed with Greek club Karditsa.

On January 5, 2024, his contract was bought out by EuroCup club Śląsk Wrocław.

On February 3, 2025, he signed with ESSM Le Portel of the LNB Pro A.
