= Sam Muldrow =

American basketball player

Windsor Express
- Position: Power forward
- League: NBL Canada

Personal information
- Born: June 8, 1988 (age 37) Florence, South Carolina, U.S.
- Listed height: 6 ft 9 in (2.06 m)
- Listed weight: 230 lb (104 kg)

Career information
- High school: Wilson (Florence, South Carolina)
- College: South Carolina (2007–2011)
- NBA draft: 2011: undrafted
- Playing career: 2011–present

Career history
- 2011–2012: Aris Thessaloniki
- 2012–2013: Dnipro-Azot
- 2013: Pieno žvaigždės
- 2013–2014: Dnipro-Azot
- 2014: ALM Évreux
- 2015: Baunach Young Pikes
- 2015: Titanes del Distrito Nacional
- 2015: Peja
- 2016: Niagara River Lions
- 2016: Rockets Gotha
- 2017–2018: Niagara River Lions
- 2018-2019: Vasco da Gama
- 2019: Windsor Express
- 2019–2020: Niagara River Lions

Career highlights
- All-CEBL First Team (2019); Greek League blocks leader (2012); SEC Defensive Player of the Year (2011); 2× SEC All-Defensive Team (2010–2011)

Sam Muldrow (born June 8, 1988) is an American professional basketball player for the Windsor Express of the National Basketball League of Canada (NBLC). He played college basketball for South Carolina.

He played 4 seasons of college basketball at the University of South Carolina, with the South Carolina Gamecocks. In March 2011, he was named SEC Defensive Player of the Year.

== Professional career ==
Muldrow went undrafted in the 2011 NBA draft. On August 16, 2011, he signed with Aris Thessaloniki of Greece for the 2011–12 season.

On August 16, 2012, Muldrow signed with Dnipro-Azot of Ukraine for the 2012–13 season. On March 19, 2013, he parted ways with Dnipro-Azot and signed with Pieno žvaigždės of Lithuania for the rest of the season. On August 22, 2013, he re-signed with Dnipro-Azot for the 2013–14 season.

In October 2014, Muldrow signed a two-month deal with an option of extension until the end of the season with Metalac Valjevo of Serbia. However, after some problems with registration, club decided to cut him. On November 6, 2014, he signed with ALM Évreux Basket of the French LNB Pro B for the rest of the 2014–15 season. In January 2015, he parted ways with Évreux after appearing in ten games. Later that month, he signed with Bike-Café Messingschlager Baunach of the German 2. Basketball Bundesliga for the rest of the season. In May 2015, he signed with Titanes del Distrito Nacional of Dominican Republic for the 2015 LNB season.

On July 29, 2015, he signed with Keravnos of the Cyprus Basketball Division 1. However two months later, on September 28, 2015, he parted ways with Keravnos before appearing in a game for them. On October 1, 2015, he signed with KB Peja of Kosovo. He left Peja after appearing in eleven league games and six BIBL games. On March 9, 2016, he signed with the Niagara River Lions of the National Basketball League of Canada.

On July 21, 2016, Muldrow signed with Oettinger Rockets Gotha of the German ProA. On November 16, 2016, he parted ways with Oettinger after appearing in ten games. On February 7, 2017, Muldrow signed with the Niagara River Lions, returning to the club for a second stint. HE was named to the All-NBLC Defensive Team in 2018. On October 26, 2017, he re-signed with the Niagara River Lions. In the beginning of July 2018, Muldrow signed with the Brazilian team Vasco da Gama. Muldrow continued to play for the Niagara River Lions as they transitioned to the Canadian Elite Basketball League (CEBL). He played the 2019 season with the River Lions, leading the team in blocks and fourth on the team for 3-pointers with 30.

Muldrow joined the Windsor Express in 2019. He averaged 14.4 points, 7.6 rebounds, and 1.7 assists per game, earning Third Team All-NBL Canada honors.
