= All Canadian Games =

The All Canadian Games are a pair of annual all-star basketball games, each featuring rosters composed of Canada's top senior high school players for that school year. Both games are played as a doubleheader; the first game featuring the top senior girls, followed by the second game featuring the top senior boys.

== History ==
The All Canadian basketball game was founded in 2015 by CEO of "Bounce Elite" (a premier boys basketball program) Tom McIntyre, Athlete Institute CEO Jesse Tipping, & BioSteel Sports Nutrition CEO & co-founder John Celenza. The first four editions of the game only featured a boys game, but the event was later expanded to include a girls game in 2019. The games feature the top 24 senior male and female high school basketball players either born in Canada or playing in the country. The Canadian game has drawn comparisons to America's McDonald's All-American Game. The first boys game was attended by upwards of 60 executives and scouts from the National Basketball Association (NBA).

== Title sponsorship ==
The game was initially branded as the BioSteel All Canadian Game when BioSteel was its title sponsor until 2023, when the company filed for bankruptcy late that year. The Games' co-founder John Celenza who was also the CEO and co-founder of BioSteel had left the company earlier in the year.

In 2024, the games were played without a title sponsor & were branded as the All Canadian Basketball Games.

On March 20, 2025, Celenza's new company that he co-founded as its new CEO, Cizzle Brands, signed a 5-year title sponsorship deal for its flagship brand Cwench Hydration to rebrand the game as the Cwench All Canadian Games.

In 2026, the CWENCH title sponsorship branding was not featured for the All Canadian Games.

== Broadcasts ==
Between 2015–23, the games were carried on The Sports Network (TSN); the inaugural event was broadcast on tape delay before they were subsequently presented live the following year. In 2024, after the game lost Biosteel as its title sponsor, the event was livestreamed via their official YouTube channel. In 2025, Cizzle Brands' newly signed branding deal also included a new partnership with TSN that restored the network's broadcast rights after a one year absence. In 2026, the All Canadian Games were broadcast on NBA TV Canada & livestreamed on CBC Gem & their YouTube channel.

== Locations ==
The inaugural game in 2015 was held at the Mattamy Athletic Centre in downtown Toronto.

Between 2016–23, the games were held annually at the Goldring Centre for High Performance Sport on the campus of the University of Toronto with the exception of 2020–21 when the games were not played due to the COVID-19 pandemic.

In 2024, the games were held at the Athlete Institute in Mono, Ontario.

In 2025, the games were held at Humber Polytechnic's north campus in northwest Toronto.

In 2026, the games were held back at the Athlete Institute in Mono, Ontario.

== Game MVPs ==
Following are the most valuable players (MVP) from each year:

MVPs
| Year | Boy's | Girl's |
|---|---|---|
| 2015 | Jamal Murray, Jalen Poyser | N/A |
| 2016 | Jahvon Blair, Kalif Young | N/A |
| 2017 | Luguentz Dort, Matur Maker | N/A |
| 2018 | Luguentz Dort, Quincy Guerrier | N/A |
| 2019 | Jahcobi Neath, Addison Patterson | Brynn Masikewich, Merissah Russell |
| 2020 | Cancelled due to COVID-19 pandemic | |
| 2021 | Cancelled due to COVID-19 pandemic | |
| 2022 | Elijah Fisher, Vasean Allette | Toby Fournier, Delaney Gibb |
| 2023 | Michael Evbagharu, Chris Tadjo | Toby Fournier, Ajok Madol |
| 2024 | Jalik Dunkley-Distant, Chris Tadjo | Jasmine Bascoe, Toby Fournier |
| 2025 | Tristan Beckford | Aliya Moses |

== Basketball Player of the Year ==
Following are the basketball player of the year (BPOY) from each year:

BPOYs
| Year | Boy's | Girl's |
|---|---|---|
| 2015 | N/A | N/A |
| 2016 | Thon Maker | N/A |
| 2017 | Oshae Brissett | N/A |
| 2018 | RJ Barrett | N/A |
| 2019 | Matthew-Alexander Moncrieffe | Micah Dennis |
| 2020 | Matthew-Alexander Moncrieffe | Aaliyah Edwards |
| 2021 | N/A | N/A |
| 2022 | Leonard Miller | Cassandre Prosper |
| 2023 | David Simon | Toby Fournier |
| 2024 | Ishan Sharma | Toby Fournier |
| 2025 | Tristan Beckford | Nyadieng Yiech |
