= Jahvon Blair =

Canadian basketball player (born 1998)

No. 1 – Hamburg Towers
- Position: Point guard / shooting guard
- League: Basketball Bundesliga

Personal information
- Born: March 27, 1998 (age 28) Oakville, Ontario, Canada
- Listed height: 6 ft 4 in (1.93 m)
- Listed weight: 210 lb (95 kg)

Career information
- High school: St. Edmund Campion (Brampton, Ontario); Athlete Institute (Mono, Ontario)
- College: Georgetown (2017–2021)
- NBA draft: 2021: undrafted
- Playing career: 2021–present

Career history
- 2021: Lavrio
- 2022: KTP Basket
- 2022: Newfoundland Growlers
- 2022: Westchester Knicks
- 2023: Niagara River Lions
- 2024: Ostioneros de Guaymas
- 2024: Niagara River Lions
- 2024–2025: Poitiers Basket 86
- 2025: Niagara River Lions
- 2025–2026: Chorale Roanne
- 2026–present: Hamburg Towers

Career highlights
- CEBL champion (2024); All-CEBL Second Team (2024); CEBL All-Canadian Team (2024); CIBACOPA All-Star (2024); Big East All-Freshman Team (2018); BioSteel All-Canadian Game MVP (2016)
Medals
Men's basketball
Representing Canada
FIBA Americas U18 Championship
Silver medal – second place	2018 Canada	Team

Jahvon Michael Henry-Blair (born March 27, 1998) is a Canadian professional basketball player for the Hamburg Towers of the German Basketball Bundesliga (BBL). He played college basketball for the Georgetown Hoyas.

== High school career ==
Blair attended St. Edmund Campion Secondary School in Brampton, Ontario before completing his high school career at the Athlete Institute in Mono, Ontario, where he averaged 23.6 points, 6.4 rebounds and 2.7 assists per game.

He was named most valuable player of the Jordan Brand Classic International Game and the BioSteel All-Canadian Game. He committed to playing college basketball for Georgetown, becoming the first commitment during the tenure of head coach Patrick Ewing.

== College career ==
As a freshman at Georgetown, Blair averaged nine points and was named to the Big East All-Freshman Team. He declined to 4.1 points per game in his sophomore season. On February 8, 2020, Blair scored a career-high 30 points in a 76–72 win over DePaul.

As a junior, he averaged 10.8 points per game. In his senior season, Blair assumed a leading role with the departures of several key players, including Mac McClung.

He led the team in scoring with 15.4 points per game and helped lead the Hoyas to the Big East tournament title and Georgetown's first NCAA tournament berth since 2015. After the season, Blair declared for the 2021 NBA draft, forgoing an additional season of eligibility.

== Professional career ==
On August 23, 2021, Blair signed his first professional contract with Lavrio of the Greek Basket League and the Basketball Champions League. On January 16, 2022, he signed with KTP Basket of the Korisliiga.

=== Westchester Knicks (2022) ===
On October 23, 2022, Blair joined the Westchester Knicks training camp roster. He was then later waived on November 14, 2022.

=== Niagara River Lions (2023) ===
On April 13, 2023, Blair signed with the Niagara River Lions of the Canadian Elite Basketball League.

On December 14, 2023, Blair joined the Delaware Blue Coats, but was waived the next day.

=== Ostioneros de Guaymas (2024) ===
Blair signed with the Ostioneros de Guaymas of the Circuito de Baloncesto de la Costa del Pacífico (CIBACOPA) ahead of the 2024 CIBACOPA season. He earned CIBACOPA All-Star honors.

=== Return to Niagara (2024) ===
On February 29, 2024, Blair agreed to return to the Niagara River Lions for a second stint.

=== Poitiers Basket 86 (2024–2025) ===
On June 26, 2024, Blair signed with Poitiers Basket 86 of the LNB Pro B.

=== Chorale Roanne Basket (2025–present) ===
On June 20, 2025, he signed with Chorale Roanne Basket of the LNB Pro A.

== National team career ==
Blair represented Canada at the 2016 FIBA Americas Under-18 Championship. He averaged 6.8 points and helped his team win the silver medal. Blair later represented the senior national team at the 2022 FIBA AmeriCup.

== Career statistics ==
Legend
GP	Games played	GS	Games started	MPG	Minutes per game
FG%	Field goal percentage	3P%	3-point field goal percentage	FT%	Free throw percentage
RPG	Rebounds per game	APG	Assists per game	SPG	Steals per game
BPG	Blocks per game	PPG	Points per game	**Bold**	Career high

=== College ===
Year	Team	GP	GS	MPG	FG%	3P%	FT%	RPG	APG	SPG	BPG	PPG													
2017–18	Georgetown	30	2	21.5	.332	.322	.857	2.2	1.7	.4	.0	9.0													
2018–19	Georgetown	**32**	0	12.5	.350	.344	.625	1.3	1.3	.2	.0	-	2019–20	Georgetown	31	12	26.4	.361	.326	**.869**	3.1	2.0	**.7**	.0	10.8
2020–21	Georgetown	25	**17**	**34.7**	**.393**	**.351**	.849	**3.6**	**3.6**	**.7**	.0	**15.4**													
Career		118	31	23.1	.363	.335	.833	2.5	2.1	.5	.0	9.5													
