= Ahmed Hill =

American basketball player (born 1995)

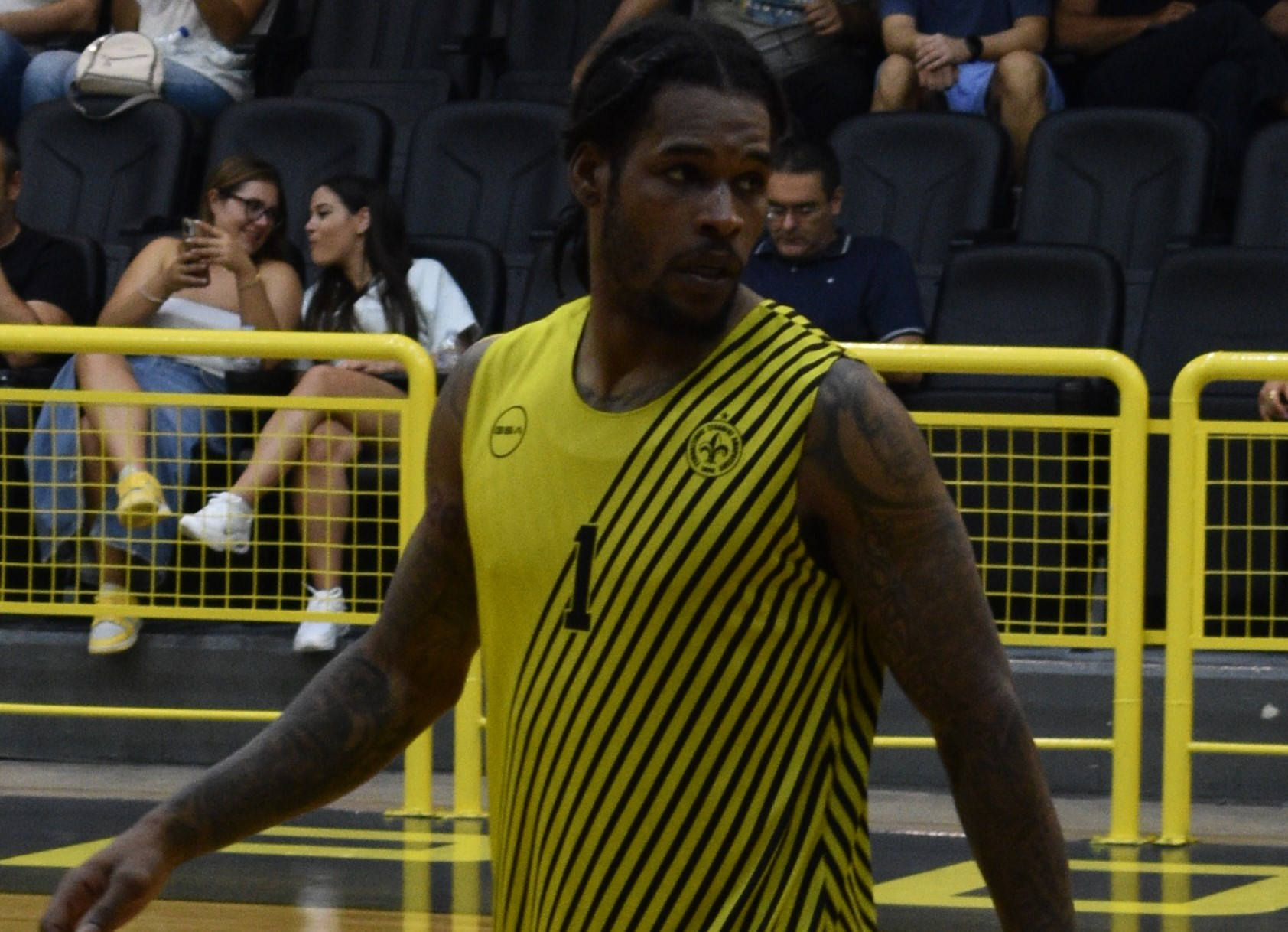
- Hill in 2023

No. 1 – Panteras de Aguascalientes
- Position: Small forward / shooting guard
- League: LNBP

Personal information
- Born: March 21, 1995 (age 31) Fort Valley, Georgia, U.S.
- Listed height: 6 ft 5 in (1.96 m)
- Listed weight: 205 lb (93 kg)

Career information
- High school: Aquinas (Augusta, Georgia)
- College: Virginia Tech (2014–2019)
- NBA draft: 2019: undrafted
- Playing career: 2019–present

Career history
- 2019–2020: Northern Arizona Suns
- 2021: Greensboro Swarm
- 2021: Guelph Nighthawks
- 2021–2022: HydroTruck Radom
- 2022: Guelph Nighthawks
- 2022–2023: Medi Bayreuth
- 2023: Montreal Alliance
- 2023–2024: Maroussi
- 2024: Montreal Alliance
- 2024: Hapoel Galil Elyon
- 2024–2025: Yalovaspor
- 2025: Peristeri
- 2025: Niagara River Lions
- 2026: Johor Southern Tigers
- 2026–present: Panteras de Aguascalientes

Career highlights
- 2× All-CEBL Second Team (2021, 2023)
- Stats at Basketball Reference

Ahmed Ismael Hill (born March 21, 1995) is an American professional basketball player. He first played college basketball for the Virginia Tech Hokies.

== College career ==
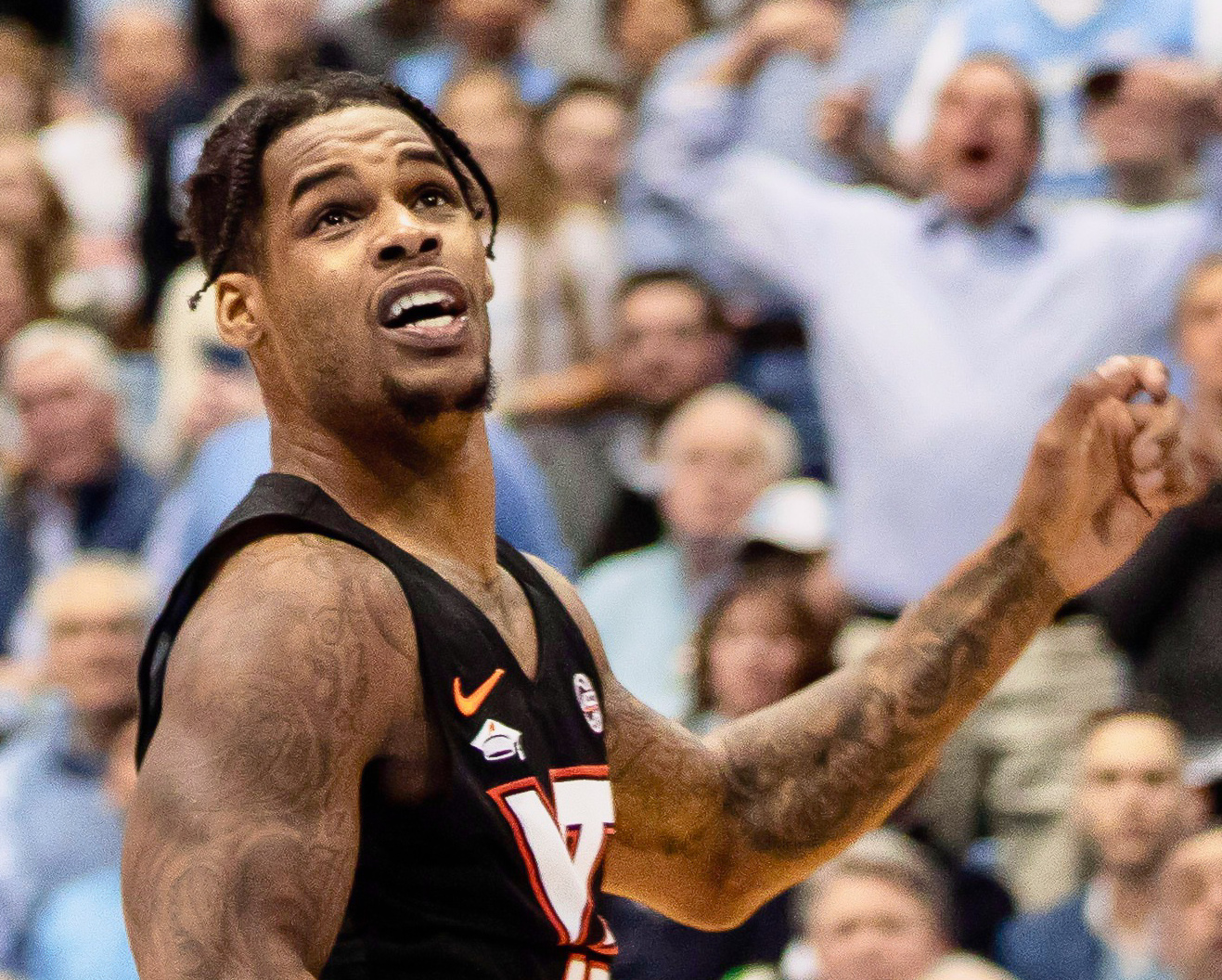
Hill with the Virginia Tech Hokies in 2019

Hill was born in Fort Valley, Georgia and came to Virginia Tech from Aquinas High School in Augusta, Georgia. He originally committed to Marquette, but chose to follow coach Buzz Williams when he moved to the Hokies. After starting as a freshman, Hill suffered an offseason knee injury and missed the 2015–16 season. Hill returned to action after his redshirt year and started the majority of his last three seasons. He had his most productive season as a senior, averaging 13.1 points and 3.9 rebounds per game.

== Professional career ==
Following the close of his college career, Hill played in the 2019 Portsmouth Invitational Tournament to gain exposure to professional scouts. Though he was not selected in the 2019 NBA draft, Hill signed a two-way contract with the Charlotte Hornets of the National Basketball Association (NBA). The Hornets waived Hill on October 19, 2019. He then signed with the Northern Arizona Suns of the NBA G League.

For the 2020–21 season, Hill joined the Greensboro Swarm of the G League. In 11 games, he averaged 4.2 points, 2.1 rebounds and 1.4 assists in 14.7 minutes. On March 26, he signed with the Guelph Nighthawks of the CEBL. Hill averaged 16.8 points and 2.3 assists per game for the Nighthawks. On December 6, 2021, he has signed with HydroTruck Radom of the Polish Basketball League.

In May 2022, Hill was reacquired by the Guelph Nighthawks.

On August 5, 2022, he has signed with Medi Bayreuth of the Basketball Bundesliga.

On April 6, 2023, Hill signed with the Montreal Alliance of the CEBL for the 2023 season. On July 28, 2023, he became the league's first player to reach 1000 career points.

On September 15, 2023, Hill signed with Greek club Maroussi.

On August 7, 2024, Hill signed with Hapoel Nofar Energy Galil Elion of the Ligat Winner Sal.

On November 8, 2024, he signed with Yalovaspor Basketbol of the Turkish Basketbol Süper Ligi (BSL). On January 15, 2025, Hill returned to Greece for Peristeri.

On April 24, 2025, he announced he would join the Niagara River Lions after finishing the season with Peristeri. He starred for the River Lions that season, including putting up 29 points and 6 rebounds in the playoff semifinals to lead them to the title game, which his team then won behind his 16 points and 9 rebounds to repeat as champions.
