= Yale Secondary School =

Yale Secondary

Location
- 34620 Old Yale Rd; Abbotsford, British Columbia, V2S 7S6; Canada

Information
- School type: Public, high school
- Motto: Ad Summum
- Established: 1971
- School board: School District 34 Abbotsford
- School number: 3434038
- Principal: Stan Wiebe
- Staff: 74
- Grades: 9–12
- Enrollment: 1303 (January 16, 2018)
- Team name: Yale Lions
- Last updated: March 20, 2018

Yale Secondary is a public high school in Abbotsford, British Columbia part of School District 34 Abbotsford. There are approximately 1250 full-time students in grades 9 through 12. The current principal of the school is Stan Wiebe.

== History ==
Yale Junior Secondary School was founded in 1971 for students in grade 9 through 11 and touted as a "new and modern school."

== Notable alumni ==
- Jarrod and Jamie Bacon of the Bacon Brothers (gangsters), gangsters
- Mackenzie Carson, Canadian & English National Rugby Team Player
- Victoria Duffield, Real Estate Agent & Former Musician
- Burkely Duffield, Actor
- Noah Juulsen, Former NHL Player
- Marek Klassen, Basketball Player
- Nick Taylor, PGA Tour Player. Competed for Canada at 2024 Olympics
- Shea Theodore, 2023 NHL Stanley Cup Champion
- Devon Toews, 2022 NHL Stanley Cup Champion
- Jake Virtanen, Former NHL Player
- Kristina Collins, social media personality
