= Simisola Shittu =

British-born Canadian basketball player (born 1999)

No. 45 – Ratiopharm Ulm
- Position: Center
- League: Basketball Bundesliga

Personal information
- Born: 7 November 1999 (age 27) Harrow, London, England
- Listed height: 6 ft 10 in (2.08 m)
- Listed weight: 240 lb (109 kg)

Career information
- High school: Corpus Christi (Burlington, Ontario); Montverde Academy (Montverde, Florida); Vermont Academy (Saxtons River, Vermont)
- College: Vanderbilt (2018–2019)
- NBA draft: 2019: undrafted
- Playing career: 2019–present

Career history
- 2019–2020: Windy City Bulls
- 2021: Westchester Knicks
- 2021–2022: Ironi Ness Ziona
- 2022–2023: Lakeland Magic
- 2023: Iowa Wolves
- 2023: Calgary Surge
- 2023: Limoges CSP
- 2023–2024: Kolossos Rodou
- 2024: Yukatel Merkezefendi
- 2024–2025: Promitheas Patras
- 2025: Winnipeg Sea Bears
- 2025–2026: KK Ilirija
- 2026: Löwen Braunschweig
- 2026–present: Ratiopharm Ulm

Career highlights
- All-CEBL Second Team (2025); All-CEBL First Team (2023); CEBL All-Canadian Team (2023); CEBL rebounding champion (2023); McDonald's All-American (2018)
- Stats at NBA.com
- Stats at Basketball Reference
Medals
Men's basketball
Representing Canada
FIBA Americas U16 Championship
Silver medal – second place	2015 Argentina	National team

Oluwasimisola "Simisola" Shittu (born 7 November 1999) is a British-born Canadian professional basketball player for Ratiopharm Ulm of the Basketball Bundesliga (BBL). He played college basketball for the Vanderbilt Commodores. He was one of the top-ranked players in the high school class of 2018.

== Early life ==
Shittu was born in Harrow, London, to a family of Nigerian and Caribbean heritage. He moved to Canada when he was five years old. Shittu then moved to the United States before his freshman year to play higher competition.

== High school career ==
=== Recruiting ===
College recruiting
Name	Hometown	School	Height	Weight	Commit date
Simisola Shittu; PF	Burlington, ON	Vermont Academy (VT)	6 ft 9 in (2.06 m)	220 lb (100 kg)	Nov 22, 2017
Simisola Shittu; PF	Recruit ratings: Rivals: 247Sports: ESPN: (92)				
Overall recruit ranking: Rivals: 7 247Sports: 8 ESPN: 19
Note: In many cases, Scout, Rivals, 247Sports, On3, and ESPN may conflict in their listings of height and weight.; In these cases, the average was taken. ESPN grades are on a 100-point scale.; Sources: "Vanderbilt 2018 Basketball Commitments". Rivals.; "2018 Vanderbilt Commodores Recruiting Class". ESPN.; "2018 Team Ranking". Rivals.

== College career ==
Shittu had an underwhelming freshman year. After Darius Garland tore his meniscus during a game against Kent State, the team went 5–23 including a 0–18 in conference play. His draft value dropped dramatically over the season. Shittu averaged 10.9 points, 6.7 rebounds, and 1.8 assists per game during his freshman season. Following the season, he declared for the 2019 NBA draft.

== Professional career ==
=== Windy City Bulls (2019–2020) ===
After going undrafted in the 2019 NBA draft, Shittu joined the Memphis Grizzlies for the 2019 NBA Summer League. On 4 October 2019, Shittu signed with the Chicago Bulls. He was waived in training camp, but assigned to the Bulls' NBA G League affiliate, the Windy City Bulls. In the final home game of the season, Shittu had 32 points and 21 rebounds in a loss to the Canton Charge.

On 6 December 2020, the Chicago Bulls re-signed Shittu on a non-guaranteed deal. On 18 December 2020, Shittu had a career high 13 points and 6 rebounds in a win against the Oklahoma City Thunder. He was waived at the end of training camp.

=== Westchester Knicks (2021) ===
On 21 January 2021, Shittu was included in the roster of the Westchester Knicks. He averaged 14.4 points, 10.1 rebounds and 1.4 assists per game.

=== Ironi Ness Ziona (2021–2022) ===
On 24 November 2021, Shittu signed with Ironi Ness Ziona of the Israeli Basketball Super League.

=== Lakeland Magic (2022–2023) ===
On 9 August 2022, Shittu was signed by the Orlando Magic. He was waived prior to the start of the 2022–23 season. On 3 November 2022, Shittu was named to the opening night roster for the Lakeland Magic.

=== Iowa Wolves (2023) ===
On 12 February 2023, Shittu was traded to the Iowa Wolves.

=== Calgary Surge (2023) ===
On 12 May 2023, Shittu signed with the Calgary Surge of the Canadian Elite Basketball League.

=== Limoges CSP (2023) ===
On 31 July 2023, Shittu signed with Limoges CSP of the French LNB Pro A.

=== Kolossos Rodou (2023–2024) ===
On 20 December 2023, Shittu moved to Greek club Kolossos Rodou.

=== Yukatel Merkezefendi (2024) ===
On 8 August 2024, he signed with Yukatel Merkezefendi of the Basketbol Süper Ligi (BSL).

=== Promitheas Patras (2024–2025) ===
On 20 December 2024, Shittu returned to Greece for Promitheas Patras.

=== Löwen Braunschweig (2026–present) ===
On January 19, 2026, he signed with Löwen Braunschweig of the Basketball Bundesliga (BBL).

Ratiopharm Ulm (present)

In the recent Off-Season, he signed with Ratiopharm Ulm of the Basketball Bundesliga (BBL) for a one-season-contract.

== Career statistics ==
Legend
GP	Games played	GS	Games started	MPG	Minutes per game
FG%	Field goal percentage	3P%	3-point field goal percentage	FT%	Free throw percentage
RPG	Rebounds per game	APG	Assists per game	SPG	Steals per game
BPG	Blocks per game	PPG	Points per game	**Bold**	Career high

=== College ===
Year	Team	GP	GS	MPG	FG%	3P%	FT%	RPG	APG	SPG	BPG	PPG
2018–19	Vanderbilt	32	31	26.7	.468	.056	.576	6.7	1.8	.7	.5	10.9
