= Quincy Guerrier =

Canadian basketball player (born 1999)

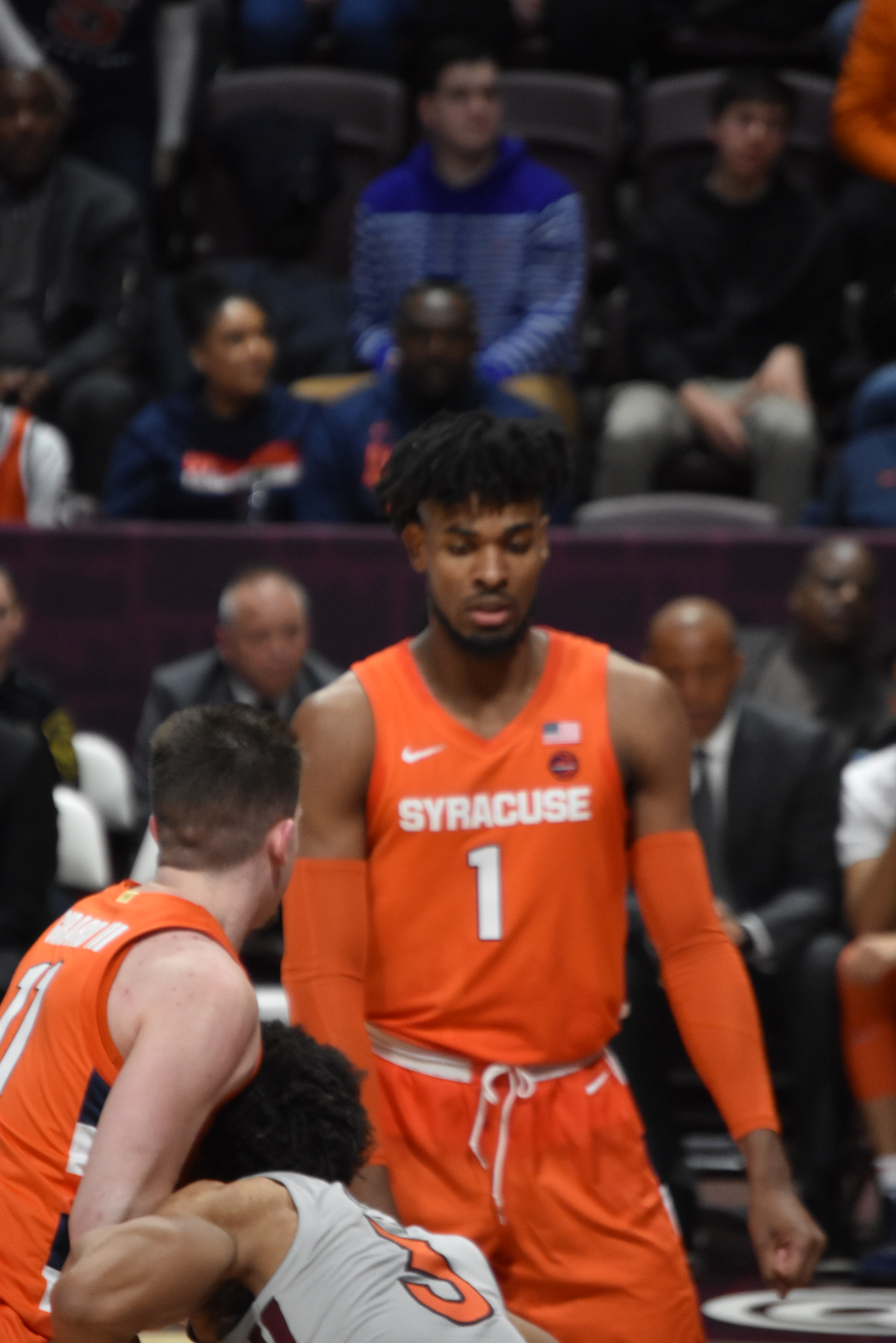
- Guerrier with Syracuse in 2020

CSM Oradea
- Position: Small forward / power forward
- League: Liga Națională

Personal information
- Born: May 13, 1999 (age 27) Montreal, Quebec, Canada
- Listed height: 6 ft 7 in (2.01 m)
- Listed weight: 220 lb (100 kg)

Career information
- High school: TEAM Thetford (Thetford Mines, Quebec)
- College: Syracuse (2019–2021); Oregon (2021–2023); Illinois (2023–2024)
- NBA draft: 2024: undrafted
- Playing career: 2024–present

Career history
- 2024–2025: Raptors 905
- 2025: Montreal Alliance
- 2025–2026: Raptors 905
- 2026: Montreal Alliance
- 2026-present: CSM Oradea

Career highlights
- Third-team All-ACC (2021); BioSteel All-Canadian Game MVP (2018)
- Stats at NBA.com
- Stats at Basketball Reference

Quincy Guerrier (born May 13, 1999) is a Canadian professional basketball player who plays for CSM Oradea of the Liga Națională of Romania. Guerrier played college basketball for the Illinois Fighting Illini, Oregon Ducks and Syracuse Orange.

== Early life and career ==
Guerrier was born in Montreal and played soccer and street hockey before focusing on basketball. He attended Thetford Academy in Thetford Mines, Quebec for five years, turning down offers from larger schools. In 2018, Guerrier was named team most valuable player at the BioSteel All-Canadian Game. He averaged 24.7 points and 6.2 rebounds per game in his final season with Thetford. Guerrier competed for Brookwood Elite and CIA Bounce on the Amateur Athletic Union circuit. He committed to playing college basketball for Syracuse over offers from Illinois and Oregon.

College recruiting
| Name | Hometown | School | Height | Weight | Commit date |
|---|---|---|---|---|---|
| Quincy Guerrier #6 SF | Quebec City, QC | Thetford Academy | 6 ft 7 in (2.01 m) | 190 lb (86 kg) | Oct 31, 2018 |
| Quincy Guerrier #6 SF | Recruit ratings: Scout: Rivals: 247Sports: ESPN: (NR) | | | | |
Overall recruit ranking:
Note: In many cases, Scout, Rivals, 247Sports, On3, and ESPN may conflict in their listings of height and weight.; In these cases, the average was taken. ESPN grades are on a 100-point scale.; Sources: "2019 Syracuse Signees". Rivals.; "2019 Syracuse Signees". Scout.; "2019 Syracuse Signees". ESPN.; "Scout.com Team Recruiting Rankings". Scout.; "2019 Team Ranking". Rivals.

== College career ==
Guerrier was unable to enroll at Syracuse University in January 2019 because his academic records were not presented to the National Collegiate Athletic Association (NCAA) in time. He joined the team in the following semester. On February 11, 2020, Guerrier recorded a freshman season-high 16 points and 10 rebounds in a 79–74 loss to NC State. As a freshman, he served as his team's sixth man, averaging 6.9 points and 5.3 rebounds per game. Guerrier underwent surgery on June 2 to repair a torn muscle in his groin. On December 21, he was named ACC Player of the Week after a 27-point, 11-rebound performance in an overtime win over Buffalo and an 18-point, 16-rebound effort against Northeastern. Guerrier averaged 13.7 points and 8.4 rebounds per game as a sophomore, and had four 20-point games and 8 double-doubles. He was named to the Third Team All-ACC.

On May 20, 2021, Guerrier announced that he would transfer to Oregon.

After two seasons with the Ducks, Guerrier announced his transfer to the Illinois Fighting Illini for his fifth and final season.

== Professional career ==
After going undrafted in the 2024 NBA draft, Guerrier joined the Toronto Raptors for the 2024 NBA Summer League. On September 24, 2024, he signed with the team, but was waived the same day. On October 28, he joined Raptors 905.

On May 18, 2025, Guerrier made his debut with the Montreal Alliance of the Canadian Elite Basketball League (CEBL). He scored a game-high 21 points and grabbed 10 rebounds in a 86-66 win at Verdun Auditorium. During his two seasons with the Alliance, Guerrier has served as team captain. In his first season (2025), Guerrier averaged 16.2 points, 7.3 rebounds, and 2.4 assists per game and earned CEBL All-Canadian Team honours. In his second season, Guerrier averaged a team-leading 15.4 points per game.

== National team career ==
Guerrier represented Canada at the 2016 FIBA Under-17 World Championship in Zaragoza. In four games, he averaged 5.5 points and two rebounds per game.

== Career statistics ==
Legend
| GP | Games played | GS | Games started | MPG | Minutes per game |
| FG% | Field goal percentage | 3P% | 3-point field goal percentage | FT% | Free throw percentage |
| RPG | Rebounds per game | APG | Assists per game | SPG | Steals per game |
| BPG | Blocks per game | PPG | Points per game | **Bold** | Career high |

=== College ===
| Year | Team | GP | GS | MPG | FG% | 3P% | FT% | RPG | APG | SPG | BPG | PPG |
|---|---|---|---|---|---|---|---|---|---|---|---|---|
| 2019–20 | Syracuse | 32 | 0 | 20.3 | **.497** | .125 | .606 | 5.3 | .6 | .5 | .8 | 6.9 |
| 2020–21 | Syracuse | 28 | 28 | **32.9** | .492 | .311 | **.673** | **8.4** | .8 | **.8** | **1.1** | **13.7** |
| 2021–22 | Oregon | 35 | 35 | 26.4 | .423 | .327 | .642 | 5.3 | .8 | .7 | .3 | 10.1 |
| 2022–23 | Oregon | 36 | 22 | 25.8 | .423 | .347 | .581 | 4.6 | **1.0** | .4 | .4 | 9.0 |
| 2023–24 | Illinois | **38** | **38** | 24.2 | .476 | **.374** | .569 | 6.1 | .3 | .3 | .3 | 9.6 |
| Career | | 169 | 123 | 25.7 | .459 | .331 | .613 | 5.8 | .7 | .5 | .6 | 9.7 |

== Personal life ==
His father, Steve Guerrier, played baseball in Montreal, while his mother, Saoua Melissa Lemay Nague, is a former ballet dancer. He is the oldest of four children. Guerrier speaks English, French and Haitian Creole.

== See also ==
- List of NCAA Division I men's basketball career games played leaders
