= Brandon Sampson =

American basketball player (born 1997)

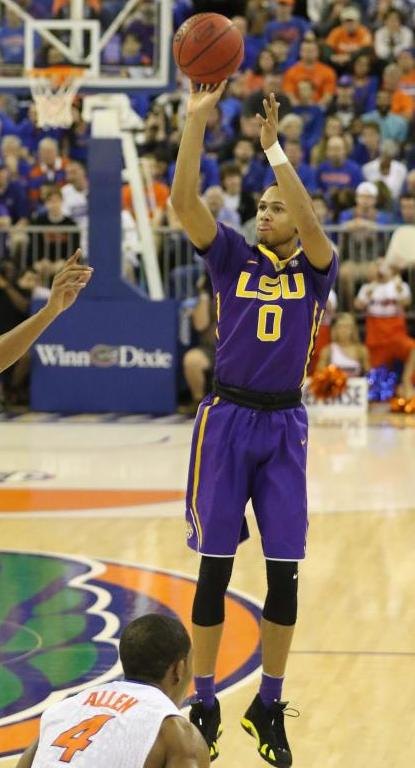
- Sampson with the LSU Tigers in 2016

No. 44 – Anhui Wenyi
- Position: Shooting guard
- League: NBL

Personal information
- Born: May 1, 1997 (age 29) Baton Rouge, Louisiana, U.S.
- Listed height: 6 ft 5 in (1.96 m)
- Listed weight: 184 lb (83 kg)

Career information
- High school: Madison Prep (Baton Rouge, Louisiana)
- College: LSU (2015–2018)
- NBA draft: 2018: undrafted
- Playing career: 2018–present

Career history
- 2018: Rio Grande Valley Vipers
- 2018–2019: Chicago Bulls
- 2018–2019: →Windy City Bulls
- 2019–2020: Rio Grande Valley Vipers
- 2021: Delaware Blue Coats
- 2021–2022: Iowa Wolves
- 2022: Newfoundland Growlers
- 2022–2023: Iowa Wolves
- 2023: Wisconsin Herd
- 2023: Hapoel Be'er Sheva
- 2024: Ottawa BlackJacks
- 2025–present: Anhui Wenyi

Career highlights
- Louisiana Mr. Basketball (2015)
- Stats at NBA.com
- Stats at Basketball Reference

Brandon Sampson (born May 1, 1997) is an American professional basketball player for the Anhui Wenyi of the Chinese National Basketball League (NBL). He played college basketball for Louisiana State University (LSU).

== High school career ==
Sampson was named Louisiana Mr. Basketball as a senior for Madison Preparatory Academy in 2015 after averaging 15.9 points, 2.9 rebounds and 2.2 assists per game in leading the team to a state championship. He signed with coach Steve Lavin at St. John's, but reopened his commitment when Lavin was fired in 2015. He ultimately signed with hometown LSU.

== College career ==
Sampson was part of a heralded LSU recruiting class for coach Johnny Jones, which also included future NBA players Ben Simmons and Antonio Blakeney. After a disappointing freshman season, which saw the Tigers underperform as a team and Sampson's minutes fluctuate, he found more consistency as a sophomore in the 2016–17 season. He averaged 11.6 points and 3.1 rebounds in 27.5 minutes per game, starting the majority of the season.

As a junior the following year, Sampson suffered a severe ankle sprain, which caused him to miss a month of the season. Upon his return, Sampson had difficulty with consistency due to the lingering effects of the injury. On the season, he averaged 7.7 points in 18.9 minutes per game.

== Professional career ==
Following his junior season, Sampson declared for the 2018 NBA draft, but was not selected. After playing for the Atlanta Hawks in the 2018 NBA Summer League. He then signed an exhibit 10 contract with the Houston Rockets, who ultimately placed him on their NBA G League affiliate, the Rio Grande Valley Vipers. In 18 games with the Vipers, Sampson averaged 17.6 points, 4.8 rebounds and 3.9 assists per game.

On December 27, 2018, Sampson signed a two-way contract with the Chicago Bulls. Under the terms of the agreement, he would split time with the Bulls' G League affiliate, the Windy City Bulls. He was assigned and made his Windy City debut the next night, scoring 17 points and passing for 5 assists in a win. Sampson later made his NBA debut on January 30, 2019, with 5 points and 2 rebounds recorded in a 105–89 win over the Miami Heat.

On October 27, 2019, Sampson was included in the training camp roster of the Rio Grande Valley Vipers. He had a season high 27 points on January 13, 2020, additionally posting five rebounds and two assists in a win over the South Bay Lakers. In 42 games, Sampson averaged 13.2 points, 2.9 rebounds and 2.2 assists per game.

In 2020–21, Sampson played for the Delaware Blue Coats, appearing in 6 games in the pandemic-shortened season.

On October 26, 2021, Sampson joined the Iowa Wolves after a trade. In 30 appearances, he averaged 14.4 points, 3.7 rebounds, and 2.0 assists.

On April 12, 2022, Sampson signed with the Newfoundland Growlers of the CEBL.

On November 2, 2022, Sampson was named to the opening night roster for the Iowa Wolves.

On February 24, 2023, Sampson was traded to the Wisconsin Herd.

On August 5, 2023, Sampson signed with Hapoel Be'er Sheva of the Ligat HaAl.

On August 19, 2025, he signed with Trefl Sopot of the Polish Basketball League (PLK). On September 25, 2025, it was announced that his contract will be terminated without playing an official game .

== Career statistics ==
Legend
GP	Games played	GS	Games started	MPG	Minutes per game
FG%	Field goal percentage	3P%	3-point field goal percentage	FT%	Free throw percentage
RPG	Rebounds per game	APG	Assists per game	SPG	Steals per game
BPG	Blocks per game	PPG	Points per game	**Bold**	Career high

=== NBA ===
==== Regular season ====
Year	Team	GP	GS	MPG	FG%	3P%	FT%	RPG	APG	SPG	BPG	PPG
2018–19	Chicago	14	2	15.3	.467	.379	.667	1.1	.7	.6	.2	5.1
Career		14	2	15.3	.467	.379	.667	1.1	.7	.6	.2	5.1

=== College ===
Year	Team	GP	GS	MPG	FG%	3P%	FT%	RPG	APG	SPG	BPG	PPG
2015–16	LSU	27	5	13.2	.321	.269	.704	1.2	.8	.4	.1	4.0
2016–17	LSU	**31**	**26**	**27.5**	.475	.339	**.780**	**3.1**	**1.4**	.6	**.5**	**11.6**
2017–18	LSU	27	9	18.9	**.476**	**.350**	.702	2.6	.8	**.8**	.1	7.7
Career		85	40	20.2	.442	.324	.745	2.3	1.0	.6	.2	7.9
