= Kenny Otieno =

Kenyan-Canadian basketball player

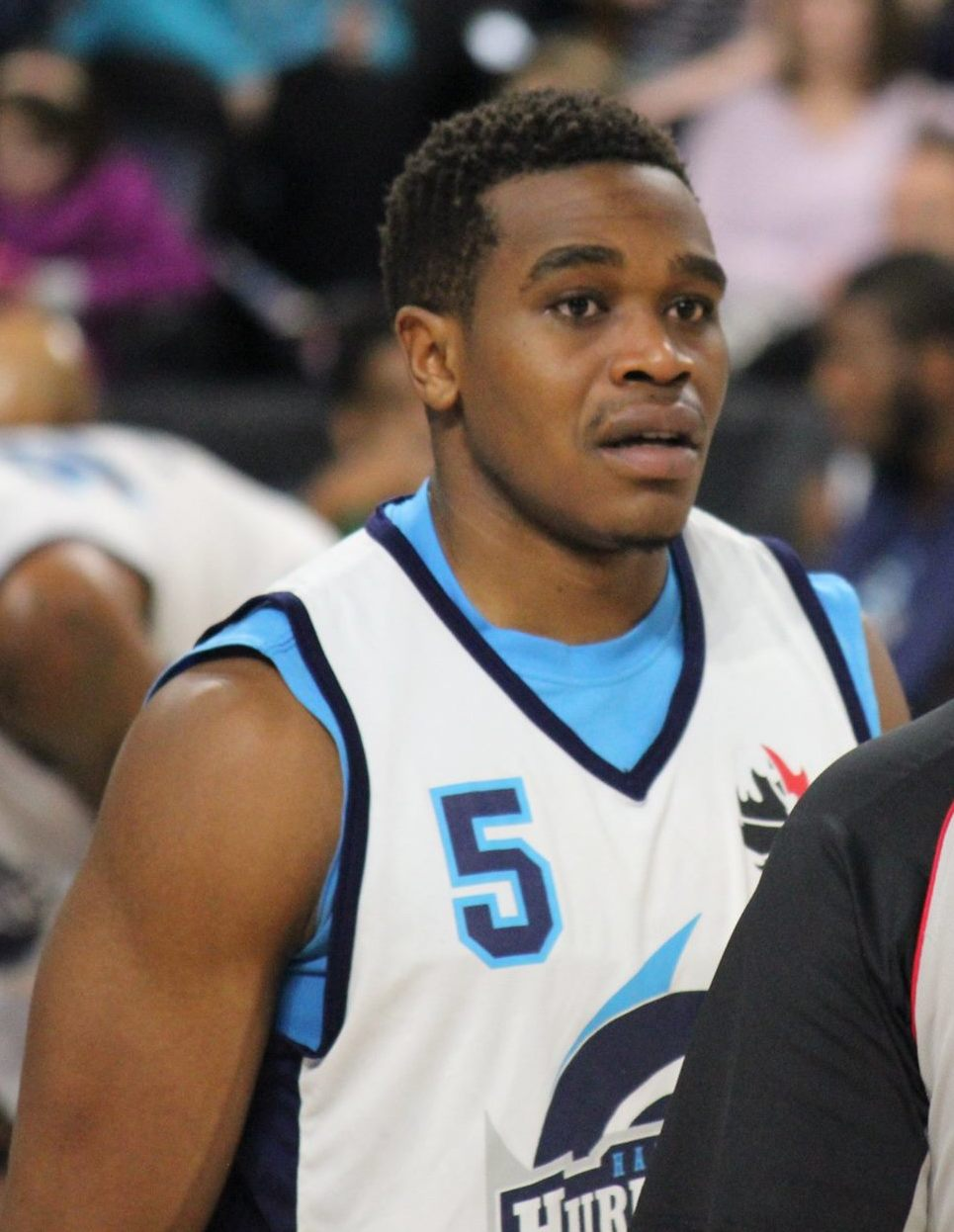
- Otieno with the Halifax Hurricanes in 2017

Personal information
- Born: June 21, 1991 (age 35) Nairobi, Kenya
- Listed height: 6 ft 3 in (1.91 m)
- Listed weight: 198 lb (90 kg)

Career information
- High school: Winston Churchill (Lethbridge)
- College: Alberta (2009–2015)
- NBA draft: 2015: undrafted
- Playing career: 2015–2019
- Position: Guard
- Number: 15

Career history
- 2015–2016: Island Storm
- 2016: Sammic ISB
- 2016–2017: Halifax Hurricanes
- 2017–2018: Saint John Riptide
- 2018–2019: Edmonton Stingers

Career highlights
- Second-team Canada West All-Star (2014); First-team Canada West All-Star (2013); CIS Most Efficient Player (2013)

Kenneth Aoro Otieno (born June 21, 1991) is a Kenyan-Canadian former professional basketball player. He played college basketball with Alberta, redshirting two seasons and earning all-conference honors. Born in Nairobi, Otieno was brought up in Edmonton and attended Winston Churchill High School in Lethbridge. At the professional level, he primarily competed in the NBL Canada, although he spent time in Spain as well.

== Early life ==
Otieno attended Winston Churchill High School in Lethbridge, Alberta, graduating in 2009. Mainly a swingman, he played his final three seasons of basketball with the senior varsity team. Otieno played one season with his older brother Bob and often drew large crowds to his games. As a senior, Kenny averaged over 20 points and 10 rebounds per game for Winston Churchill. He helped the school earn a bronze medal at the 3A Provincial Championship, its best finish ever at the competition. His high school coach Kevin McBeath credited him for bringing a "winning tradition" to the program.

== College career ==
Otieno played his freshman season of college basketball for the Alberta Golden Bears in 2009–10. He joined the program expected to be a capable defender and rebounder due to his wingspan. After 13 games as a freshman, he was averaging 8.5 points and 5.6 rebounds per game. For the following season, Otieno was placed on the injured list and also sat out in 2011–12, remaining eligible for three more years.

After Otieno's return in the 2012–13 season, he took on a larger role for the Golden Bears. Against Manitoba on February 1, 2013, he scored a career-high 36 points. On February 9, in a loss to Winnipeg, he recorded a team-high 18 points and six assists. In the season, he averaged 19.3 points, 6.0 rebounds, and 2.8 assists per game, leading Canadian Interuniversity Sport (CIS) in player efficiency. He also earned first-team Canada West All-Star and team MVP honors.

In the 2013–14 season, Otieno averaged 11.7 points, 3.6 rebounds, and 1.3 assists, making the second-team Canada West All-Star team. He led Alberta to a Canada West title and a bronze medal at the 2014 CIS Men's Basketball Championship. In addition, he was named MVP of the University of Winnipeg Wesmen Classic Basketball Tournament.

In Otieno's final season with the Golden Bears, he averaged 14.0 points, 5.0 rebounds, and 2.2 assists per game. He earned team MVP accolades as well as the University of Alberta President's Trophy Award for Achievement in Sports and Academics.

== Professional career ==
On October 15, 2015, Otieno signed with the Island Storm of the National Basketball League of Canada (NBL) for training camp. Head coach Joe Salerno said, "I think Kenny's ability to shoot the ball from the perimeter and his reputation for versatile team-first type play is exactly what we look for in players." He joined the league with college teammate and best friend Joel Friesen, who was playing with the Halifax Hurricanes. Otieno made his professional debut on Boxing Day 2015 in a loss to the Saint John Mill Rats, contributing two points and two assists in six minutes. On December 31, he scored a season-high 11 points off the bench against the Hurricanes. After 18 games, he closed out the season averaging 3.2 points, 1.4 rebounds, and 0.6 assists in 7.9 minutes per game.

In October 2016, Otieno briefly competed with Sammic ISB, a Spanish team playing in LEB Plata. In his first start, he led his team to a win over Tarragona Bàsquet 2017 with 12 points and three rebounds. In four games in Spain, in 16.3 minutes per game, Otieno averaged 4.8 points, 2.3 rebounds, and 0.5 assists.

Otieno was later named to the training camp roster of the Halifax Hurricanes for the 2016–17. He soon joined the team as a shooting guard with three-point shooting expertise. Head coach Mike Leslie praised him: "He knows how to play the game well and never tries to do more than is required at the time, which is valuable in a player."

On October 23, 2017, Otieno was signed by the St. John's Edge, an expansion team in the NBL Canada. However, he was not named to the final roster.
