= 2019 CEBL Entry Draft =

Canadian Elite Basketball League draft

General information
- Sport: Basketball
- Date: March 23, 2019
- Location: Art Gallery of Hamilton, Hamilton, Ontario

Overview
- 78 total selections in 13 rounds
- League: Canadian Elite Basketball League
- Teams: 6
- First selection: Joel Friesen, Fraser Valley Bandits

The 2019 CEBL Entry Draft was the inaugural CEBL Entry Draft, held on March 23, 2019, at the Art Gallery of Hamilton in Hamilton, Ontario. Six Canadian Elite Basketball League (CEBL) teams selected 78 athletes in total.

== Format ==
A blind draw was used to determine the draft order for the first round. A "snake draft" was used, with the order reversing in even-numbered rounds, and the original order in odd-numbered rounds. The draft order for the first round was drawn as follows:

1. Fraser Valley Bandits
2. Edmonton Stingers
3. Guelph Nighthawks
4. Saskatchewan Rattlers
5. Hamilton Honey Badgers
6. Niagara River Lions

The first four rounds were regional rounds, in which teams selected players from their region. The three eastern teams had to choose players from Eastern Canada and the western teams from Western Canada. The next seven rounds were open rounds, with teams able to select players from any region of the world. The final two rounds were U Sports rounds, in which teams selected players playing in U Sports, Canada's university basketball program.

== Player selection ==
=== Regional rounds ===
==== Round 1 ====
Pick	Team	Player	Hometown	School team
1	Fraser Valley Bandits	Joel Friesen	Abbotsford, British Columbia	Alberta
2	Edmonton Stingers	Mamadou Gueye	Quebec City, Quebec	Alberta
3	Guelph Nighthawks	Connor Wood	Guelph, Ontario	Carleton
4	Saskatchewan Rattlers	Denzel James	Edmonton, Alberta	MacEwan
5	Hamilton Honey Badgers	MiKyle McIntosh	Toronto, Ontario	Oregon
6	Niagara River Lions	Kaza Kajami-Keane	Ajax, Ontario	Carleton

==== Round 2 ====
Pick	Team	Player	Hometown	School team
7	Niagara River Lions	Kassius Robertson	Toronto, Ontario	Missouri State
8	Hamilton Honey Badgers	Erik Nissen	Quispamsis, New Brunswick	Acadia
9	Saskatchewan Rattlers	Jelane Pryce	Innisfil, Ontario	Winnipeg
10	Guelph Nighthawks	Jevohn Shepherd	Toronto, Ontario	Michigan State
11	Edmonton Stingers	Mathieu Kamba	Calgary, Alberta	Central Arkansas
12	Fraser Valley Bandits	Marek Klassen	Abbotsford, British Columbia	Point Loma Nazarene

==== Round 3 ====
Pick	Team	Player	Hometown	School team
13	Fraser Valley Bandits	Diego Kapelan	Vancouver, British Columbia	McNeese State
14	Edmonton Stingers	Jarred Ogungbemi-Jackson	Winnipeg, Manitoba	Calgary
15	Guelph Nighthawks	Marvin Binney	Toronto, Ontario	Saint Mary's
16	Saskatchewan Rattlers	Justus Alleyn	Winnipeg, Manitoba	Manitoba
17	Hamilton Honey Badgers	Duane Notice	Toronto, Ontario	South Carolina
18	Niagara River Lions	Guillaume Boucard	Montreal, Quebec	Carleton

==== Round 4 ====
Pick	Team	Player	Hometown	School team
19	Niagara River Lions	Tyrone Watson	Hamilton, Ontario	New Mexico State
20	Hamilton Honey Badgers	Junior Cadougan	Toronto, Ontario	Marquette
21	Saskatchewan Rattlers	Thomas Cooper	Chattanooga, United States	Calgary
22	Guelph Nighthawks	Emanual Shepherd	Toronto, Ontario	Southern
23	Edmonton Stingers	Jordan Baker	Edmonton, Alberta	Alberta
24	Fraser Valley Bandits	Dallin Bachynski	Calgary, Alberta	Utah

=== Open rounds ===
==== Round 5 ====
Pick	Team	Player	School team
25	Fraser Valley Bandits	Conor Morgan	UBC
26	Edmonton Stingers	Adika Peter-McNeilly	Ryerson
27	Guelph Nighthawks	Chris Johnson	St. Bonaventure
28	Saskatchewan Rattlers	Alex Campbell	Windsor
29	Hamilton Honey Badgers	Murphy Burnatowski	Colgate
30	Niagara River Lions	Julian Boyd	LIU Brooklyn

==== Round 6 ====
Pick	Team	Player	School team
31	Niagara River Lions	Nem Mitrovic	Portland
32	Hamilton Honey Badgers	Derek Cooke, Jr.	Wyoming
33	Saskatchewan Rattlers	Chad Posthumus	Morehead State
34	Guelph Nighthawks	Xavier Rathan-Mayes	Florida State
35	Edmonton Stingers	Akeem Ellis	Coppin State
36	Fraser Valley Bandits	Elijah Foster	Nevada

==== Round 7 ====
Pick	Team	Player	School team
37	Fraser Valley Bandits	Levon Kendall	Pittsburgh
38	Edmonton Stingers	Ashton Smith	IUP
39	Guelph Nighthawks	Meshack Lufile	CBU
40	Saskatchewan Rattlers	Gentrey Thomas	UC Riverside
41	Hamilton Honey Badgers	Justin Edwards	Kansas State
42	Niagara River Lions	Alex Johnson	NC State

==== Round 8 ====
Pick	Team	Player	School team
43	Niagara River Lions	Joel Kindred	St. Augustine's
44	Hamilton Honey Badgers	Ryan Ejim	Carleton
45	Saskatchewan Rattlers	Kevin Bercy	St. Francis Xavier
46	Guelph Nighthawks	Marvell Waithe	Arkansas
47	Edmonton Stingers	Christian Musoko	Southern Utah
48	Fraser Valley Bandits	Maurice Jones	Northwest Nazarene

==== Round 9 ====
Pick	Team	Player	School team
49	Fraser Valley Bandits	Ransford Brempong	Western Carolina
50	Edmonton Stingers	Corey Allmond	Sam Houston State
51	Guelph Nighthawks	Meshack Lufile	Texas
52	Saskatchewan Rattlers	Michael Linklater	Saskatchewan
53	Hamilton Honey Badgers	Shaquille Keith	CBU
54	Niagara River Lions	Ryan Wright	Oklahoma State

==== Round 10 ====
Pick	Team	Player	School team
55	Niagara River Lions	Rayvon Higdon	Redeemer
56	Hamilton Honey Badgers	Joe Rocca	Carleton
57	Saskatchewan Rattlers	Shane Osayande	Saskatchewan
58	Guelph Nighthawks	Jamal Reynolds	Canisius
59	Edmonton Stingers	Grandy Glaze	Grand Canyon
60	Fraser Valley Bandits	Rashaun Broadus	BYU

==== Round 11 ====
Pick	Team	Player	School team
61	Fraser Valley Bandits	Troy Gottselig	Saskatchewan
62	Edmonton Stingers	Greg Morrow	Western
63	Guelph Nighthawks	Chadrack Lufile	Wichita State
64	Saskatchewan Rattlers	Terry Thomas	Ottawa
65	Hamilton Honey Badgers	Tramar Sutherland	Little Rock
66	Niagara River Lions	Jaylon Tate	Illinois

=== U-Sports rounds ===
==== Round 12 ====
Pick	Team	Player	School team
67	Niagara River Lions	Fil Vujadinovic	Ryerson
68	Hamilton Honey Badgers	Connor Gilmore	McMaster
69	Saskatchewan Rattlers	Chan De Ciman	Saskatchewan
70	Guelph Nighthawks	Malcolm Glanville	Guelph
71	Edmonton Stingers	Narcisse Ambanza	Winnipeg
72	Fraser Valley Bandits	Mason Bourcier	UBC

==== Round 13 ====
Pick	Team	Player	School team
73	Fraser Valley Bandits	Grant Shephard	UBC
74	Edmonton Stingers	Brody Clarke	Alberta
75	Guelph Nighthawks	Myles Charvis	Ryerson
76	Saskatchewan Rattlers	Jean-Victor Mukama	Ryerson
77	Hamilton Honey Badgers	Thomas Kennedy	Windsor
78	Niagara River Lions	Tyler Brown	Brock
