= 2022 CEBL season =

Canadian basketball league season

- League: Canadian Elite Basketball League
- Sport: Basketball
- Duration: Season: May 25 – August 1 Play in games: August 4 Playoffs: August 6–14
- Games: 20 per team
- Teams: 10
- TV partner: CBC Sports

Draft
- Top draft pick: David Muenkat
- Picked by: Scarborough Shooting Stars

Regular season
- Top seed: Hamilton Honey Badgers
- Season MVP: Khalil Ahmad (Niagara)
- Top scorer: Khalil Ahmad (Niagara)

Championship weekend
- Venue: TD Place Arena; Ottawa, Ontario
- Champions: Hamilton Honey Badgers (1st Title)
- Runners-up: Scarborough Shooting Stars
- Finals MVP: Christian Vital

Seasons
- ← 2021 2023 →

The 2022 CEBL season was the fourth season of the Canadian Elite Basketball League (CEBL). It began on May 25, 2022, and ended on August 1, 2022. There will be play-in games on August 4 where the 5th to 8th seed will compete to play in the playoffs. The playoffs will start on August 6. The Championship weekend will be from August 12 to the 14; the Ottawa BlackJacks will be hosting the event. It is also the inaugural season for the Montreal Alliance, Newfoundland Growlers, and the Scarborough Shooting Stars. The Hamilton Honey Badgers defeated the Scarborough Shooting Stars 90–88, for their first CEBL championship in franchise history. They will represent Canada in the 2022-23 BCL Americas season.

== Teams ==
2022 Canadian Elite Basketball League
Team	City	Arena	Capacity
Edmonton Stingers	Edmonton, Alberta	Edmonton Expo Centre	4,000
Fraser Valley Bandits	Langley, British Columbia	Langley Events Centre	5,276
Guelph Nighthawks	Guelph, Ontario	Sleeman Centre	4,715
Hamilton Honey Badgers	Hamilton, Ontario	FirstOntario Centre	17,383
Montreal Alliance	Montreal, Quebec	Verdun Auditorium	4,100
Newfoundland Growlers	St. John's, Newfoundland and Labrador	Field House at Memorial University	2,500
Niagara River Lions	St. Catharines, Ontario	Meridian Centre	4,030
Ottawa BlackJacks	Ottawa, Ontario	TD Place Arena	9,500
Saskatchewan Rattlers	Saskatoon, Saskatchewan	SaskTel Centre	15,100
Scarborough Shooting Stars	Toronto, Ontario	Toronto Pan Am Sports Centre	2,000

=== Map of teams ===
CEBL Teams

== Regular season ==
=== Standings ===
Pos	Team	Pld	W	L	PF	PA	PD	PCT	Qualification
1	Hamilton Honey Badgers (C)	20	14	6	1697	1570	+127	.700	Advance to championship weekend
2	Niagara River Lions	20	13	7	1763	1643	+120	.650	Advance to quarter-finals
3	Scarborough Shooting Stars	20	12	8	1716	1656	+60	.600	Advance to quarter-finals
4	Fraser Valley Bandits	20	12	8	1718	1736	−18	.600	Advance to play in games
5	Saskatchewan Rattlers	20	11	9	1665	1749	−84	.550	Advance to play in games
6	Edmonton Stingers	20	10	10	1701	1691	+10	.500	Advance to play in games
7	Guelph Nighthawks	20	10	10	1753	1760	−7	.500	Advance to play in games
8	Ottawa BlackJacks (H)	20	8	12	1740	1721	+19	.400	Advance to championship weekend (Note: Automatically qualified for championship weekend as the host team.)
9	Newfoundland Growlers	20	6	14	1699	1775	−76	.300	
10	Montreal Alliance	20	4	16	1523	1668	−145	.200	

Source: CEBL
(C) Champions; (H) Hosts

=== Results ===
Teams	EDM	FRA	GUE	HAM	MON	NEW	NIA	OTT	SSK	SSS	EDM	FRA	GUE	HAM	MON	NEW	NIA	OTT	SSK	SSS
Edmonton Stingers	—	81–84	101–100	81–87	85–72	120–69	74–86	96–88	84–71	69–78	—							91–100		
Fraser Valley Bandits	86–80	—	79–87	68–80	97–81	94–92	99–102	95–88	90–78	92–89		—								86–93
Guelph Nighthawks	95–101	85–90	—	89–83	86–84	89–82	84–95	86–79	104–82	89–80			—		96–80					
Hamilton Honey Badgers	81–88	70–71	103–85	—	80–72	95–91	79–83	86–75	107–86	84–70			95–76	—						
Montreal Alliance	60–64	89–72	94–74	72–79	—	71–94	64–76	86–80	72–82	80–70					—	85–105				
Newfoundland Growlers	74–89	81–88	80–87	68–86	84–83	—	87–95	85–86	83–60	88–95						—			93–91	
Niagara River Lions	77–79	86–95	101–88	73–76	87–62	98–97	—	89–78	81–86	75–86	97–69						—			
Ottawa BlackJacks	92–84	87–90	73–83	104–95	81–62	80–94	86–90	—	101–50	81–98		100–79						—		
Saskatchewan Rattlers	97–85	86–77	84–81	74–81	98–86	90–71	92–89	92–90	—	83–99							92–90		—	
Scarborough Shooting Stars	97–74	101–86	94–89	69–84	78–68	99–81	70–93	90–91	85–91	—				75–72						—

Source: https://www.cebl.ca/result2fiba
Legend: Blue = left column team win; Red = top row team win.

=== Attendance ===
As of August 3, 2022 (Note: The attendances for Fraser Valley, Saskatchewan, Ottawa (June 21), Guelph (June 25), Scarborough (June 26) and Edmonton (June 30) home games hasn't been announced. Newfoundland have only announced attendance for games on June 5 and June 12.)

Pos	Team	Total	High	Low	Average	Change
1	Montreal Alliance	29,290	3,500	2,214	2,929	n/a
2	Niagara River Lions	22,737	3,247	1,549	2,274	n/a
3	Ottawa BlackJacks	18,159	3,538	1,408	1,816	n/a
4	Edmonton Stingers	17,300	3,000	800	1,922	n/a
5	Scarborough Shooting Stars	14,682	2,280	1,317	1,631	n/a
6	Hamilton Honey Badgers	18,109	2,904	1,260	1,811	n/a
7	Guelph Nighthawks	13,341	2,992	780	1,482	n/a
8	Newfoundland Growlers	1,892	1,084	808	946	n/a
9	Fraser Valley Bandits					n/a
10	Saskatchewan Rattlers					n/a
	League total	91,192	3,538	780	1,824	n/a

== Play in round ==
=== Play in games ===
CBC

August 4
7:00pm

recap

Saskatchewan Rattlers 94, Edmonton Stingers 91
Scoring by quarter: 29–12, 22–23, 17–25, 26–31
Pts: Devonte Bandoo 22; Rebs: Jordy Tshimanga 11; Asts: Devonte Bandoo 9	Pts: Adika Peter—Mcneilly 19; Rebs: Jordan Baker 11; Asts: Trahson Burrell 5

SaskTel Centre, Saskatoon, Saskatchewan
Attendance: N/A
Referees: Vernon Bovell, Mitch Strom, Chris Buccella

CBC

August 4
7:30pm

recap

Fraser Valley Bandits 85, Guelph Nighthawks 90
Scoring by quarter: 25–25, 11–25, 26–19, 23–21
Pts: Brandon Gilbeck 21; Rebs: Alex Campbell, Shane Gibson, Brandon Gilbeck 6 Asts: Marek Klassen 10	Pts: Ahmed Hill 27; Rebs: Giorgi Bezhanishvili 10; Asts: Stefan Smith 5

Langley Events Centre, Langley, B.C.
Attendance: N/A
Referees: Tanner Cervo, Reed Scott, Tony Turnbull

== Playoffs ==
=== Bracket ===
Quarter-finals; August 6 & 7
2	Niagara	99
7	Guelph	78
3	Scarborough	108
5	Saskatchewan	96

Semi-finals; August 12
1	Hamilton	76
8	Ottawa	72
2	Niagara	81
3	Scarborough	93

Final; August 14
1	Hamilton	90
3	Scarborough	88

=== Quarter-finals ===
CBC

August 6
7:00pm

recap

Guelph Nighthawks 78, Niagara River Lions 99
Scoring by quarter: 22–17, 12–36, 28–21, 16–25
Pts: Ahmed Hill 17; Rebs: Sean Miller-Moore 6 Asts: Cat Barber 6	Pts: EJ Onu 28; Rebs: Daniel Walden-Mullings 11; Asts: Elijah Mitrou-Long 6

Sleeman Centre Guelph, Ontario
Attendance: 1,408
Referees: Tony Turnbull, Christine Vuong, Chris Buccella

CBC

August 7
3:00pm

recap

Scarborough Shooting Stars 108, Saskatchewan Rattlers 96
Scoring by quarter: 21–19, 20–22, 36–25, 29—32
Pts: Jalen Harris, Kassius Robertson 24; Rebs: Teddy Allen 7 Asts: Kalif Young 4	Pts: Tony Carr 21; Rebs: Tony Carr 13; Asts: Tony Carr 15

Toronto Pan Am Sports Centre, Scarborough, Ontario
Attendance: 1,612
Referees: Jayson Stiell, Frank Rizzuti Robb, Caporicci

== Championship Weekend ==
=== Semi-finals ===
CBC

August 12
4:00pm

recap

Niagara River Lions 81, Scarborough Shooting Stars 93
Scoring by quarter: 26-14, 9–19, 21–27, 25–33
Pts: EJ Onu 26; Rebs: Antonio Davis Jr 8 Asts: Khalil Ahmad, Antonio Davis Jr 6	Pts: Jalen Harris, Kameron Chatman 22; Rebs: Jalen Harris, Isiaha Mike 8 Asts: Jalen Harris 6

TD Place Arena, Ottawa, Ontario
Attendance: N/A
Referees: Michael Weiland, Tony Turnbull, MP Malo

CBC

August 12
7:00pm

recap

Hamilton Honey Badgers 76, Ottawa BlackJacks 72
Scoring by quarter: 12–20, 22–17, 23–18, 19–17
Pts: Christian Vital 16; Rebs: Koby Mcewen 9 Asts: Celeb Agada, Jeremiah Tilman 5	Pts: Zena Edosomwan 14; Rebs: Zena Edosomwan 10; Asts: Walt Lemon Jr 6

TD Place Arena, Ottawa, Ontario
Attendance: 2,827
Referees: Jayson Stiell, Robb Caporicci, Tanner Cervo

=== Final ===
CBC

August 14
3:30pm

recap

Hamilton Honey Badgers 90, Scarborough Shooting Stars 88
Scoring by quarter: 26—25, 25–19, 18—15, 21—29
Pts: Christian Vital 17; Rebs: Caleb Agada 7 Asts: Caleb Agada 5	Pts: Kassius Robertson 23; Rebs: Kyle Alexander 7 Asts: Kassius Robertson 5

TD Place Arena, Ottawa, Ontario
Attendance: 2,788
Referees: Jayson Stiell, Tony Turnbull, MP Malo

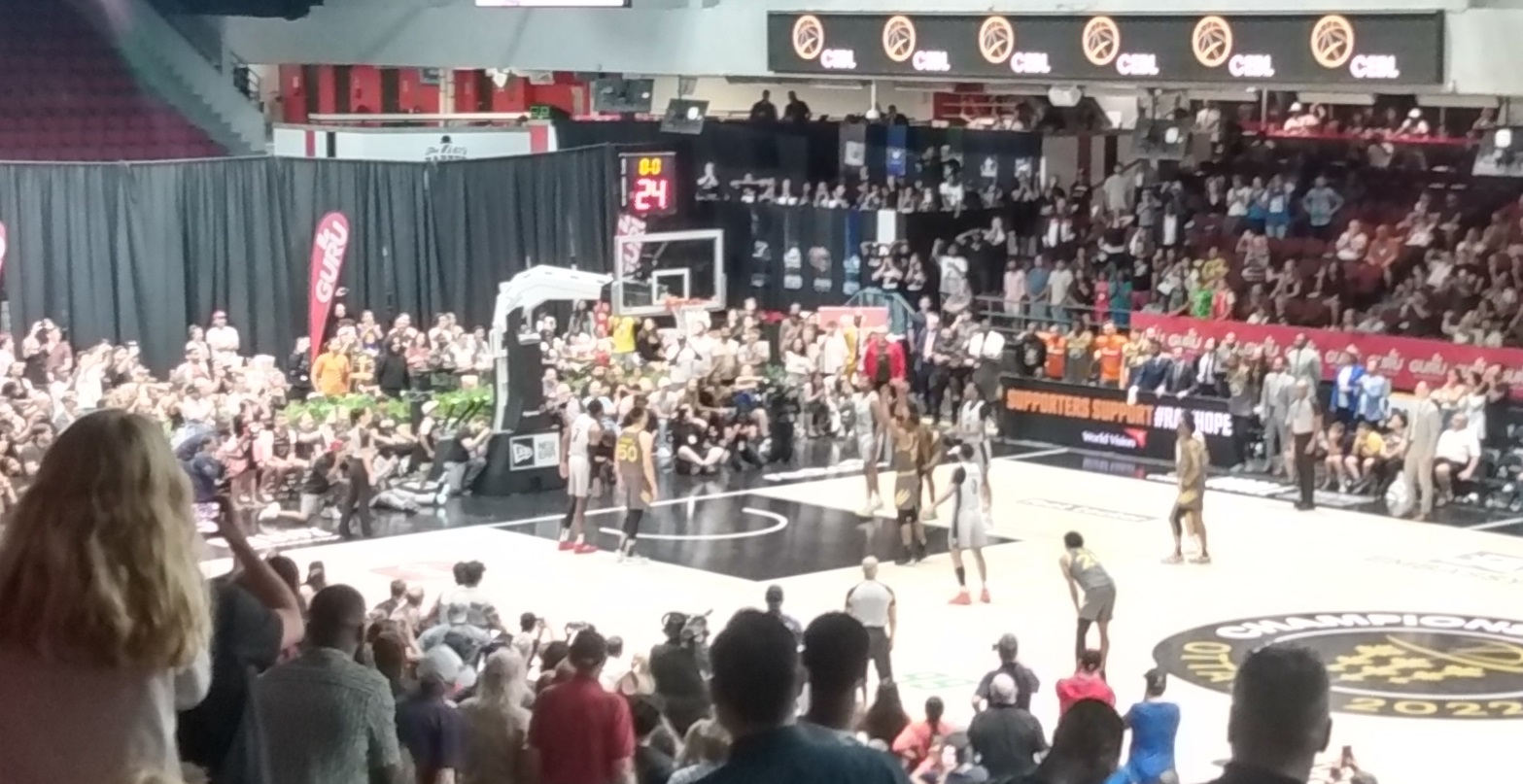
The winning free-throw for Hamilton

== Awards ==
- Player of the Year: Khalil Ahmad, Niagara River Lions
- Canadian Player of the Year: Caleb Agada, Hamilton Honey Badgers
- U Sports Developmental Player of the Year: Thomas Kennedy, Fraser Valley Bandits
- Defensive Player of the Year: EJ Onu, Niagara River Lions
- Referee of the Year: Jayson Stiell
- Clutch Player of the Year: Khalil Ahmad, Niagara River Lions
- Coach of the Year: Ryan Schmidt, Hamilton Honey Badgers
- 6th man of the year: Koby McEwen, Hamilton Honey Badgers
- CEBL Final MVP: Christian Vital, Hamilton Honey Badgers

=== All-CEBL teams ===
First Team		Pos.	Second Team	
Player	Team	Pos.	Player	Team
Isiaha Mike	Scarborough Shooting Stars	F	Jordan Baker	Edmonton Stingers
Caleb Agada	Hamilton Honey Badgers	G	Christian Vital	Hamilton Honey Badgers
Jalen Harris	Scarborough Shooting Stars	G	Brandon Sampson	Newfoundland Growlers
Khalil Ahmad	Niagara River Lions	G	Cat Barber	Guelph Nighthawks
Tony Carr	Saskatchewan Rattlers	G	Shane Gibson	Fraser Valley Bandits

=== All-Canadian team ===
Pos.	Player	Team
F	Thomas Kennedy	Fraser Valley Bandits
F	Jordan Baker	Edmonton Stingers
F	Isiaha Mike	Scarbororough Shooting Stars
G	Caleb Agada	Hamilton Honey Badgers
G	AJ Lawson	Guelph Nighthawks

== Statistics ==
=== Individual statistic leaders ===
Category	Player	Team(s)	Statistic
Points per game	Khalil Ahmad	Niagara River Lions	21.1
Rebounds per game	Jordan Baker	Edmonton Stingers	9.4
Assists per game	Tony Carr	Saskatchewan Rattlers	6.5
Steals per game	Christian Vital	Hamilton Honey Badgers	2.2
Blocks per game	EJ Onu	Niagara River Lions	3.3
FG%	Jeremiah Tilman	Hamilton Honey Badgers	63.9%
3P%	Isiaha Mike	Scarborough Shooting Stars	47.4%
