= Newfoundland Growlers (basketball) =

- Leagues: Canadian Elite Basketball League
- Founded: 2021
- History: Newfoundland Growlers (2021–2022)
- Arena: Field House at Memorial University
- Capacity: 2,500
- Location: St. John's, Newfoundland and Labrador
- Team colours: Gold, black
- General manager: Patrick Ewing Jr.
- Head coach: Patrick Ewing Jr.
- Ownership: Deacon Sports and Entertainment
- Website: growlersbasketball.ca

The Newfoundland Growlers were a Canadian professional basketball team based in St. John's, Newfoundland and Labrador. Founded in 2021, they competed in the Canadian Elite Basketball League (CEBL) and played their home games at the Field House at Memorial University of Newfoundland. They were owned and operated by Deacon Sports and Entertainment, the same organization that operated the professional hockey team that is also called the Newfoundland Growlers. The Growlers are the third professional basketball team to be based in the St. John's area after the St. John's Edge of the National Basketball League of Canada and the Newfoundland Rogues of the American Basketball Association.

== History ==
On July 15, 2021, the St. John's Edge of the National Basketball League of Canada (NBL Canada) were unable to secure a lease with St. John's Sports and Entertainment (SJSE), the group that owns Mile One Centre, and were announced as not returning to the venue for the 2022 season. The Edge's ownership had been negotiating with the arena alongside Deacon Sports and Entertainment (DSE), the majority owner of the arena's hockey tenant Newfoundland Growlers, where DSE would have taken over as primary owner of the Edge upon the lease renewal. DSE chose not to sign the lease as SJSE had included terms that the Edge's debts for the installation of a 360 LED board must be rectified or taken on by DSE.

SJSE instead awarded a lease to an outside ownership group, 2001 Investments Limited, and their American Basketball Association franchise. On September 10, the sale of the Edge to DSE was approved by the league if an arena deal could be settled. DSE stated they were committed to keeping the Edge in the region, but no home arena was announced at the time. The Growlers were also evicted from the arena in October 2021 leading an on-going lease dispute between SJSE and DSE, leading to their first six home games of the season being moved to Conception Bay South. The Edge were granted a leave of absence by the NBL in November 2021 in order to obtain a new lease but the sale of the team to DSE was never finalized.

After the deal for the Edge fell through, DSE instead founded a new basketball team in the Canadian Elite Basketball League (CEBL), which they also named the Newfoundland Growlers. The new Growlers began play in the 2022 CEBL season playing out of Memorial University's Field House.

On November 11, 2022, it was announced the Growlers would be ceasing operations after the amenities at the Memorial University's Field House were deemed to be inadequate for long term use and the team was unable to obtain a lease at a new venue. The team said however it is open to discussion if an opportunity to play in a new professional arena presents itself.

== Players ==
=== Roster ===
Newfoundland Growlers roster
Players
Coaches

Pos.	No.	Nat.	Name	Ht.	Wt.	Age
G		(Canada)	Cadougan, Junior	1.85 m (6 ft 1 in)	93 kg (205 lb)	35 – 7 May 1990
G		(Canada)	Thomas, Terry	1.93 m (6 ft 4 in)	82 kg (181 lb)	34 – 19 September 1991
G		(Canada)	Blair, Jahvon	1.93 m (6 ft 4 in)	86 kg (190 lb)	27 – 27 March 1998
G		(Canada)	Keith, Shaquille	1.98 m (6 ft 6 in)	103 kg (227 lb)	32 – 9 July 1993
G		(United States)	Sampson, Brandon	1.95 m (6 ft 5 in)	83 kg (183 lb)	28 – 1 May 1997
G		(Canada)	Bourcier, Mason	1.93 m (6 ft 4 in)	88 kg (194 lb)	26 – 31 August 1999
F		(Canada)	Long, Cole	2.01 m (6 ft 7 in)	95 kg (209 lb)	30 – 1 January 1996
F		(United States)	Whitney, Kahlil	1.88 m (6 ft 2 in)	95 kg (209 lb)	25 – 8 January 2001
C		(Canada)	Post, Keanau	2.11 m (6 ft 11 in)	122 kg (269 lb)	33 – 4 September 1992
C		(Canada)	Kordrostami, Marlon	2.08 m (6 ft 10 in)	118 kg (260 lb)	29 – 10 July 1996
G		(Canada)	Sabean, Gage	1.98 m (6 ft 6 in)	84 kg (185 lb)	28 – 15 October 1997
F		(Canada)	Shepherd, Emanual	2.03 m (6 ft 8 in)	91 kg (201 lb)	30 – 29 December 1995
C		(Canada)	Lufile, Meshack	2.06 m (6 ft 9 in)	109 kg (240 lb)	33 – 21 October 1992
G		(United States)	Griffin, Alan	1.96 m (6 ft 5 in)	86 kg (190 lb)	25 – 14 April 2000

Head coach

- (Jamaica) Patrick Ewing Jr.

Legend

- (C) Team captain
- (I) Import player
- Injured

=== Notable past players ===
- Brandon Sampson (born 1997)

== Honours ==
All CEBL Team

Second Team All Star

Season	Position	Player
2022	Guard	Brandon Sampson

== Season-by-season record ==
League	Season	Coach	Regular season				Postseason			
League	Season	Coach	Won	Lost	Win %	Finish	Won	Lost	Win %	Result
CEBL
CEBL	2022	Patrick Ewing Jr	6	14	.300	9th	did not qualify			
Totals			6	14	.300	—	0	0	–	
