= Montreal Alliance =

Canadian professional basketball team

Montreal Alliance Alliance de Montréal
- 2026 CEBL season
- Leagues: CEBL
- Founded: 2021
- History: Montreal Alliance (2021–present)
- Arena: Verdun Auditorium
- Capacity: 4,111
- Location: Montreal, Quebec
- Team colours: Red, white, navy & light blue
- President: Nicolas Lesage
- General manager: Joel Anthony
- Head coach: Vacant
- Ownership: Alli–Oop Investments
- Championships: 0
- Website: alliancemontreal.ca

The Montreal Alliance (French: Alliance de Montréal) are a Canadian professional basketball team based in Montreal, Quebec, Canada founded in 2021. They compete in the Canadian Elite Basketball League (CEBL) and play their home games at the Verdun Auditorium. Montreal is led by head coach Jermaine Small. The Montreal Alliance’s mascot is called “Alli-Oop”.

== History ==
Most recently, the Montreal Jazz played its only season in the National Basketball League of Canada in the 2012–13 season. The team did not play in the 2013–14 NBL Canada season after failing to secure a new ownership group.

In February 2021, it was first announced that a Montreal team would join the CEBL in 2022. On October 27, 2021, the team name and branding was revealed. Joel Anthony was named the inaugural general manager of the Alliance the next month. The Montréal Alliance announced on Tuesday, March 8, 2022, that Vincent Lavandier had been named the first head coach of the Canadian Elite Basketball League (CEBL) expansion franchise.

On January 20, 2025, the Alliance were purchased from the CEBL by Alli–Oop Investments, a group led by General Manager Joel Anthony and includes Weeve CEO and founder Léo Bouisson, and pharmacy owner Ian-Philip Paul-Hus. The team was owned by the CEBL prior to the announcement and becomes the 7th privately owned team in the CEBL.

On May 23, 2025, the Montreal Alliance was scheduled to host the Ottawa Blackjacks in a CEBL game outdoors at IGA Stadium. According to the league, "It will be the first professional five-on-five basketball game held outdoors in Canadian history." The game was postponed by two days due to inclement weather in the forecast, then ultimately cancelled midway through the game when rain and humidity made the court conditions dangerous for the players.

== Players ==
=== Current roster ===
Montreal Alliance roster
Players
Coaches

Pos.	No.	Nat.	Name	Ht.	Wt.	Age
G	9	(Canada)	Barthelemy, Keeshawn	6 ft 1 in (1.85 m)	180 lb (82 kg)	25 – 2 January 2001
F	24	(Canada)	Boursiquot, Maxime	6 ft 5 in (1.96 m)	211 lb (96 kg)	29 – 14 June 1997
G	11	(Canada)	Duvivier, Malcolm	6 ft 3 in (1.91 m)	190 lb (86 kg)	31 – 28 February 1995
G	3	(Canada)	Haïdara, Bahaïde	6 ft 6 in (1.98 m)	200 lb (91 kg)	28 – 28 April 1998
PF	16	(Canada)	Kappos, Alexander	6 ft 10 in (2.08 m)	220 lb (100 kg)	29 – 26 July 1997
G	25	(United States)	Freeman-Liberty, Javon	6 ft 3 in (1.91 m)		27 – 20 August 1999
G	7	(Canada)	Ngala, Nginyu	5 ft 10 in (1.78 m)	174 lb (79 kg)	27 – 4 April 1999
G	15	(Canada)	Tchoukuiegno, Blondeau	6 ft 2 in (1.88 m)	190 lb (86 kg)	27 – 11 June 1999
C	23	(Democratic Republic of the Congo)	Tshimanga, Nate	6 ft 10 in (2.08 m)	230 lb (100 kg)	25 – 8 July 2001
F	4	(Canada)	Webster-Chan, Negus	6 ft 7 in (2.01 m)	200 lb (91 kg)	33 – 7 January 1993

Head coach

- (Canada) Jermaine Small

Assistant coach(es)

- (Canada) Jeff Dosado
- (Canada) Charles Dubé-Brais
- (Canada) Quesly-Marie Noresias
- (Canada) Vincent Plante
- (Canada) Ryan Thorne

Legend

- (C) Team captain
- (I) Inactive
- (U) Current U Sports Athlete
- Injured

- Roster
- Transactions
Updated: February 1, 2026

== Honours ==
All CEBL Teams

CEBL Second All Star

Season	Position	Player
2023	Guard	Ahmed Hill
2024	Forward	Chris Smith

CEBL All Canadian Team

Season	Position	Player	Hometown
2025	Forward	Quincy Guerrier	Montreal, Quebec
2026	Forward	Quincy Guerrier	Montreal, Quebec

== Season-by-season record ==
League	Season	Coach	Regular season				Postseason			
League	Season	Coach	Won	Lost	Win %	Finish	Won	Lost	Win %	Result
CEBL
CEBL	2022	Vincent Lavandier	4	16	.200	10th	Did not qualify			
CEBL	2023	Derrick Alston	7	13	.350	5th East	Did not qualify			
CEBL	2024	Derrick Alston	6	14	.300	5th East	0	1	.000	Lost semi-finals
CEBL	2025	Jermaine Small	9	15	.375	4th East	0	1	.000	Lost Play in game
CEBL	2026	Jermaine Small	10	14	.417	5th East	Did not qualify			
Totals			36	72	.333	—	0	2	.000	

== Head coaches ==
- (France) Vincent Lavandier: (2022)
- (United States) Derrick Alston, Sr.: (2023–2025)
- (Canada) Jermaine Small: (2025–2026)
