= Guelph Nighthawks =

- Leagues: CEBL
- Founded: 2018
- History: Guelph Nighthawks (2019–2022); Calgary Surge (2023–present)
- Arena: Sleeman Centre
- Capacity: 5,000
- Location: Guelph, Ontario, Canada
- Team colours
- President: Cameron Kusch
- Website: thenighthawks.ca

The Guelph Nighthawks were a Canadian professional basketball team based in Guelph, Ontario, Canada, that competed in the Canadian Elite Basketball League. The team played home games at the Sleeman Centre.

== History ==
On June 12, 2018, it was announced that the team would be called the Guelph Nighthawks. Guelph joined the Hamilton Honey Badgers, Edmonton Stingers, Niagara River Lions, Saskatchewan Rattlers, and Fraser Valley Bandits as one of the six original franchises for the inaugural season of the CEBL.

On August 17, 2022, it was announced that the team will be relocating to Calgary, Alberta for the 2023 CEBL season.

== Players ==
=== 2022 roster ===
Note: Flags indicate national team eligibility at FIBA-sanctioned events. Players may hold other non-FIBA nationalities not displayed.

Guelph Nighthawks roster
Players
Coaches

Pos.	No.	Nat.	Name	Ht.	Wt.	Age
G		(United States)	Hill, Ahmed	6 ft 5 in (1.96 m)	205 lb (93 kg)	30 – 21 March 1996
F		(United States)	Hess, AJ	6 ft 7 in (2.01 m)		32 – 20 January 1994
G		(Canada)	Henry, Clayton	6 ft 4 in (1.93 m)		28 – 6 November 1997
F		(Canada)	Roche, Julian	7 ft 0 in (2.13 m)		28 – 15 December 1997
G		(France)	Rotardier, Kyliann	6 ft 3 in (1.91 m)		24 – 11 February 2002
F		(South Sudan)	Akec, Madut	6 ft 7 in (2.01 m)		27 – 1 January 1999
G		(Canada)	Miller-Moore, Sean	6 ft 4 in (1.93 m)		27 – 15 October 1998
G		(Canada)	Smith, Stef	6 ft 2 in (1.88 m)		26 – 27 June 1999
F		(Canada)	Lall, Tajinder	6 ft 6 in (1.98 m)		29 – 27 October 1996
G		(Canada)	Miller, Elijah	6 ft 0 in (1.83 m)

Head coach

- (Canada) Charles Kissi

Assistant coach(es)

- (Canada) Mike Rao
- (Canada) Arsalan Jamil
- (Canada) Wumi Agunbiade
- (Canada) Bob Urosevic
- (Canada) Chris Rao
- (Canada) Mike Girling

Legend

- (C) Team captain
- (I) Inactive
- Injured

- Roster
- Transactions
Updated: June 28, 2021

== Honours ==
All CEBL Teams

Second All Star Team

Season	Position	Player
2020	Forward	Tre'Darius McCallum
2021	Forward	Ahmed Hill
2021	Guard	Cat Barber
2022	Guard	Cat Barber

All Canadian Team

Season	Player	Hometown
2022	A. J. Lawson	Toronto

Individual Awards

Community Ambassadors Award

Season	Player
2019	Abednego Lufile

== Notable players ==
- Chad Brown (born 1996), basketball player in the Israeli Basketball Premier League
- Michale Kyser (born 1991), basketball player for Hapoel Holon in the Israeli Basketball Premier League

== Season-by-season record ==
League	Season	Coach	Regular season				Postseason			
League	Season	Coach	Won	Lost	Win %	Finish	Won	Lost	Win %	Result
CEBL
CEBL	2019	Charles Kissi	6	14	.300	5th	did not qualify			
CEBL	2020	Charles Kissi	3	3	.500	5th	0	1	.000	Lost quarter-finals
CEBL	2021	Charles Kissi	5	9	.357	5th	0	1	.000	Lost quarter-finals
CEBL	2022	Charles Kissi	10	10	.500	7th	1	1	.500	Lost quarter-finals
Totals			24	36	.400	—	1	3	.250	
