= List of 2021–22 NBA season transactions =

This is a list of transactions that took place during the 2021 NBA off-season and the 2021–22 NBA season. The season set a new record for the highest number of different players to appear in at least one game in a single season.

== Retirement ==
Date	Name	Team(s) played (years)	Age	Notes
July 6	Ian Mahinmi	San Antonio Spurs (2007–2010); Dallas Mavericks (2010–2012); Indiana Pacers (2012–2016); Washington Wizards (2016–2020)	34	NBA champion (2011); Also played in the NBA D-League and overseas.
July 18	Omri Casspi	Sacramento Kings (2009–2011; 2014–2017); Cleveland Cavaliers (2011–2013); Houston Rockets (2013–2014); New Orleans Pelicans (2017); Minnesota Timberwolves (2017); Golden State Warriors (2017–2018); Memphis Grizzlies (2018–2019)	33	Also played overseas.
July 21	Amile Jefferson	Orlando Magic (2018–2020)	28	Also played in the NBA G League and overseas. Hired as director of player development by the Duke Blue Devils.
August 7	Jarrett Jack	Portland Trail Blazers (2005–2008); Indiana Pacers (2008–2009); Toronto Raptors (2009–2010); New Orleans Hornets (2010–2012); Golden State Warriors (2012–2013); Cleveland Cavaliers (2013–2014); Brooklyn Nets (2014–2016); New Orleans Pelicans (2017); New York Knicks (2017–2018)	37	Also played in the NBA G League. Hired as an assistant coach by the Phoenix Suns.
August 11	J. R. Smith	New Orleans/Oklahoma City Hornets (2004–2006); Denver Nuggets (2006–2011); New York Knicks (2012–2015); Cleveland Cavaliers (2015–2019); Los Angeles Lakers (2020)	35	2× NBA champion (2016, 2020); NBA Sixth Man of the Year (2013); Also played overseas.
August 12	Kyle Korver	Philadelphia 76ers (2003–2007); Utah Jazz (2007–2010; 2018–2019); Chicago Bulls (2010–2012); Atlanta Hawks (2012–2017); Cleveland Cavaliers (2017–2018); Milwaukee Bucks (2019–2020)	40	NBA All-Star (2015); NBA Sportsmanship Award (2015); Hired as player development coach by the Brooklyn Nets.
August 31	Jared Dudley	Charlotte Bobcats (2007–2008); Phoenix Suns (2008–2013; 2016–2018); Los Angeles Clippers (2013–2014); Milwaukee Bucks (2014–2015); Washington Wizards (2015–2016); Brooklyn Nets (2018–2019); Los Angeles Lakers (2019–2021)	36	NBA champion (2020); Hired as an assistant coach by the Dallas Mavericks.
September 20	Luis Scola	Houston Rockets (2007–2012); Phoenix Suns (2012–2013); Indiana Pacers (2013–2015); Toronto Raptors (2015–2016); Brooklyn Nets (2016–2017)	41	NBA All-Rookie First Team (2008); Also played overseas. Hired as Amministratore delegato by Openjobmetis Varese.
September 21	JJ Redick	Orlando Magic (2006–2013); Milwaukee Bucks (2013); Los Angeles Clippers (2013–2017); Philadelphia 76ers (2017–2019); New Orleans Pelicans (2019–2021); Dallas Mavericks (2021)	37	
September 28	Tyson Chandler	Chicago Bulls (2001–2006); New Orleans/Oklahoma City Hornets (2006–2009); Charlotte Bobcats (2009–2010); Dallas Mavericks (2010–2011; 2014–2015); New York Knicks (2011–2014); Phoenix Suns (2015–2018); Los Angeles Lakers (2018–2019); Houston Rockets (2019–2020)	38	NBA champion (2011); NBA All-Star (2013); All-NBA Third Team (2012); NBA Defensive Player of the Year (2012); NBA All-Defensive First Team (2013); 2× NBA All-Defensive Second Team (2011–2012); Hired as player development coach by the Dallas Mavericks.
October 5	Pau Gasol	Memphis Grizzlies (2001–2008); Los Angeles Lakers (2008–2014); Chicago Bulls (2014–2016); San Antonio Spurs (2016–2019); Milwaukee Bucks (2019)	41	2× NBA champion (2009–2010); 6× NBA All-Star (2006, 2009–2011, 2015–2016); 2× All-NBA Second Team (2011, 2015); 2× All-NBA Third Team (2009–2010); NBA Rookie of the Year (2002); NBA All-Rookie First Team (2002); J. Walter Kennedy Citizenship Award (2012); Also played overseas.
October 16	Sun Yue	Los Angeles Lakers (2008–2009)	35	NBA champion (2009); Also played in the NBA D-League and overseas.
October 20	Mike Hall	Washington Wizards (2007)	37	Also played in the NBA D-League and overseas.
October 22	Gerald Green	Boston Celtics (2005–2007; 2016–2017); Minnesota Timberwolves (2007–2008); Houston Rockets (2008; 2017–2020); Dallas Mavericks (2008–2009); New Jersey Nets (2012); Indiana Pacers (2012–2013); Phoenix Suns (2013–2015); Miami Heat (2015–2016)	35	NBA Slam Dunk Contest champion (2007); Also played in the NBA D-League and overseas. Hired as player development coach by the Houston Rockets.
October 27	David Andersen	Houston Rockets (2009–2010); Toronto Raptors (2010); New Orleans Hornets (2010–2011)	41	Also played overseas.
November 11	Damjan Rudež	Indiana Pacers (2014–2015); Minnesota Timberwolves (2015–2016); Orlando Magic (2016–2017)	35	Also played overseas.
November 26	Alexis Ajinça	Charlotte Bobcats (2008–2010); Dallas Mavericks (2010–2011); Toronto Raptors (2011); New Orleans Pelicans (2013–2018)	33	Also played in the NBA D-League and overseas.
November 27	Beno Udrih	San Antonio Spurs (2004–2007); Sacramento Kings (2007–2011); Milwaukee Bucks (2011–2013); Orlando Magic (2013); New York Knicks (2013–2014); Memphis Grizzlies (2014–2015); Miami Heat (2015–2016); Detroit Pistons (2016–2017)	39	2× NBA champion (2005, 2007); Also played overseas. Currently a player development coach for the New Orleans Pelicans.
January 18	Chandler Parsons	Houston Rockets (2011–2014); Dallas Mavericks (2014–2016); Memphis Grizzlies (2016–2019); Atlanta Hawks (2018–2020)	33	NBA All-Rookie Second Team (2012); Also played overseas.
March 9	Jeff Teague	Atlanta Hawks (2009–2016, 2020); Indiana Pacers (2016–2017); Minnesota Timberwolves (2017–2020); Boston Celtics (2020–2021); Milwaukee Bucks (2021)	33	NBA champion (2021); NBA All-Star (2015); Hired as a scout by the Atlanta Hawks.
March 21	Jamal Crawford	Chicago Bulls (2000–2004); New York Knicks (2004–2008); Golden State Warriors (2008–2009); Atlanta Hawks (2009–2011); Portland Trail Blazers (2011–2012); Los Angeles Clippers (2012–2017); Minnesota Timberwolves (2017–2018); Phoenix Suns (2018–2019); Brooklyn Nets (2020)	42	3× NBA Sixth Man of the Year (2010, 2014, 2016); NBA Teammate of the Year (2018)
May 14	Omar Cook	Portland Trail Blazers (2004); Toronto Raptors (2005)	40	Also played in the NBA D-League and overseas.
June 1	Jawad Williams	Cleveland Cavaliers (2008–2010)	39	Also played in the NBA D-League and overseas.

== Front office movements ==
=== Head coaching changes ===
Off-season

Departure date	Team	Outgoing Head Coach	Reason for Departure	Hire date	Incoming Head Coach	Last coaching position	Ref.
June 2	Boston Celtics	Brad Stevens	Promoted to General manager	June 28	Ime Udoka	Brooklyn Nets assistant coach (2020–2021)	
June 4	Portland Trail Blazers	Terry Stotts	Mutually agreed to part ways	June 27	Chauncey Billups	Los Angeles Clippers assistant coach (2020–2021)	
June 5	Orlando Magic	Steve Clifford	Mutually agreed to part ways	July 11	Jamahl Mosley	Dallas Mavericks assistant coach (2014–2021)	
June 9	Indiana Pacers	Nate Bjorkgren	Fired	June 24	Rick Carlisle	Dallas Mavericks head coach (2008–2021)	
June 16	New Orleans Pelicans	Stan Van Gundy	Mutually agreed to part ways	July 22	Willie Green	Phoenix Suns assistant coach (2019–2021)	
June 16	Washington Wizards	Scott Brooks	End of Contract	July 17	Wes Unseld Jr.	Denver Nuggets assistant coach (2015–2021)	
June 17	Dallas Mavericks	Rick Carlisle	Resigned	June 28	Jason Kidd	Los Angeles Lakers assistant coach (2019–2021)	

In-Season

Departure date	Team	Outgoing Head Coach	Reason for Departure	Hire date	Incoming Head Coach	Last coaching position	Ref.
November 21	Sacramento Kings	Luke Walton	Fired	November 21	Alvin Gentry (Interim Also fired )	Sacramento Kings assistant coach (2020–2021)	

=== General manager changes ===
Off-season

Departure date	Team	Outgoing General Manager	Reason for Departure	Hire date	Incoming General Manager	Last managerial position	Ref.
June 2	Boston Celtics	Danny Ainge	Retired	June 2	Brad Stevens		
June 16	Dallas Mavericks	Donnie Nelson	Mutually agreed to part ways	June 28	Nico Harrison		
December 3	Portland Trail Blazers	Neil Olshey	Fired	December 3	Joe Cronin (interim)(permanent)	Director of player personnel (2014–2021)	

== Player movements ==
=== Trades ===
June
June 18	To Boston Celtics: Moses Brown; Al Horford; 2023 second-round pick (Note: At the time of this trade Oklahoma City owned its own pick, Washington's pick, and the better of the picks originally belonging to Dallas and Miami; Boston will receive the worst of these three picks. Boston traded this pick to New York on August 17.)	To Oklahoma City Thunder: Kemba Walker; 2021 BOS first-round pick; 2025 second-round pick (Note: The worse of the picks originally belonging to Boston and Memphis. Orlando will receive the worse of those two picks from an earlier trade.)
July
July 29 (Draft-day trades)	To Los Angeles Clippers: Draft rights to Jason Preston (No. 33)	To Orlando Magic: 2026 DET second-round pick; Cash considerations
July 29 (Draft-day trades)	To New Orleans Pelicans: Cash considerations	To Philadelphia 76ers: 2021 No. 53 pick (Note: This trade was finalized hours before the draft began, so no draft rights were involved.)
July 30	To New Orleans Pelicans: 2026 POR second-round pick (Note: New Orleans traded the worse of this pick and their own to Portland on February 8, 2022.); Cash considerations	To Portland Trail Blazers: Draft rights to Greg Brown (No. 43)
July 30	To Houston Rockets: Draft rights to Alperen Şengün (No. 16)	To Oklahoma City Thunder: 2022 DET protected first-round pick (Note: Oklahoma City will receive the pick in 2022 if it is No. 17–30, 2023 if No. 19–30, 2024 if No. 19–30, 2025 if No. 14–30, 2026 if No. 12–30, 2027 if No. 10–30; if it is not conveyed by 2027, Oklahoma City will receive Detroit's 2027 second-round pick The pick fell within its protected range in 2022 and rolled over to 2023.); 2023 WAS protected first-round pick (Note: Oklahoma City will receive the pick in 2023 if it is No. 15–30, 2024 if No. 13–30, 2025 if No. 11–30, 2026 if No. 9–30, if it is not conveyed by 2026, Oklahoma City will receive Washington's 2026 and 2027 second-round picks.)
July 30	To Los Angeles Clippers: Draft rights to Keon Johnson (No. 21)	To New York Knicks: Draft rights to Quentin Grimes (No. 25); 2024 DET second-round pick
July 30	To Charlotte Hornets: Draft rights to Kai Jones (No. 19)	To New York Knicks: 2022 CHA protected first-round pick (Note: New York will receive the pick in 2022 if it is No. 19–30, 2023 if No. 17–30, 2024 if No. 15–30, 2025 if No. 15–30; if not conveyed by 2025, New York will receive Charlotte's 2026 and 2027 second-round picks instead. New York traded this pick to Atlanta on January 13, 2022.)
July 30	To Indiana Pacers: Draft rights to Isaiah Todd (No. 31)	To Milwaukee Bucks: Draft rights to Sandro Mamukelashvili (No. 54); Draft rights to Georgios Kalaitzakis (No. 60); 2024 second-round pick (Note: The second best of the picks originally belonging to Indiana, Cleveland, and Utah. Milwaukee traded this pick to Memphis on August 7.); 2026 second-round pick (Note: The better of Indiana's pick and the pick originally belonging to Miami. Milwaukee traded this pick to Memphis on August 7.)
July 30	To New York Knicks: Draft rights to Rokas Jokubaitis (No. 34); Draft rights to Miles McBride (No. 36)	To Oklahoma City Thunder: Draft rights to Jeremiah Robinson-Earl (No. 32)
July 30	To Oklahoma City Thunder: Derrick Favors; 2024 protected first-round pick (Note: Utah owes its protected first-round pick to Memphis by 2024 or it converts to two second-round picks. Two years after Memphis receives Utah's pick or in 2024 if Memphis's right converts, Oklahoma City's right to Utah's pick begins. OKC will receive the pick if it is No. 11–30 in 2024 or 2025, in 2026 if No. 9–30; if not conveyed by 2026 it will convert to Utah's 2028 second-round pick. Utah unconditionally conveyed its 2028 second-round pick to Oklahoma on January 4 as part of the Miya Oni trade; Utah's obligation to convey a first-round pick will be extinguished if the pick hasn't been conveyed by 2026.)	To Utah Jazz: 2027 second-round pick (Note: The worst of the picks originally belonging to Oklahoma City, Houston, Indiana, and Miami. Utah traded this pick to San Antonio on February 9, 2022.); Cash considerations
July 31	To Boston Celtics: Josh Richardson	To Dallas Mavericks: Moses Brown
August
August 2	To Cleveland Cavaliers: Ricky Rubio	To Minnesota Timberwolves: Taurean Prince; 2022 WAS second−round pick; Cash considerations
August 6	To Charlotte Hornets: Mason Plumlee; Draft rights to JT Thor (No. 37)	To Detroit Pistons: Draft rights to Balša Koprivica (No. 57)
August 6	To Miami Heat: Kyle Lowry (sign-and-trade)	To Toronto Raptors: Precious Achiuwa; Goran Dragić
August 6	To Brooklyn Nets: Jevon Carter; Draft rights to Day'Ron Sharpe (No. 29)	To Phoenix Suns: Landry Shamet
August 6	Five-team trade	
August 6	To Brooklyn Nets: 2024 second-round pick (Note: The better of the picks originally belonging to Memphis and Washington. Brooklyn traded this pick to Detroit on September 4.) (from Washington); 2025 second-round pick swap right (Note: The swap right is for Golden State's pick, not Brooklyn's. Brooklyn traded this pick to Detroit on September 4.) (from Washington); Draft rights to Nikola Milutinov (2015 No. 26) (from San Antonio)	To Indiana Pacers: Draft rights to Isaiah Jackson (No. 22) (from LA Lakers)
August 6	To Los Angeles Lakers: Russell Westbrook (from Washington); 2023 CHI second-round pick (from Washington); 2024 second-round pick (Note: The worse of the picks originally belonging to Memphis and Washington.) (from Washington); 2028 WAS second-round pick (from Washington)	To San Antonio Spurs: Chandler Hutchison (from Washington); 2022 second-round pick (Note: The best of the picks originally belonging to Chicago, Detroit, and the LA Lakers.) (from Washington)
August 6	To Washington Wizards: Kentavious Caldwell-Pope (from LA Lakers); Spencer Dinwiddie (sign-and-trade) (from Brooklyn); Montrezl Harrell (from LA Lakers); Aaron Holiday (from Indiana); Kyle Kuzma (from LA Lakers); Draft rights to Isaiah Todd (No. 31) (from Indiana); Cash considerations (from Indiana)	
August 7	Three-team trade	
August 7	To Charlotte Hornets: Wes Iwundu (from New Orleans); Draft rights to Tyler Harvey (2015 No. 51) (from Memphis); 2022 NOP protected first-round pick (Note: Charlotte will receive the pick if it is No. 15–30, otherwise they receive the Pelicans' second-round picks in 2022 and 2024. The pick fell within its protected range and converted.) (from New Orleans); Cash considerations (from New Orleans)	To Memphis Grizzlies: Steven Adams (from New Orleans); Eric Bledsoe (from New Orleans); Draft rights to Ziaire Williams (No. 10) (from New Orleans); Draft rights to Jared Butler (No. 40) (from New Orleans); 2022 LAL protected first-round pick (Note: Memphis will receive the pick if it is No. 11–30, otherwise they will receive Cleveland's 2022 second-round pick and New Orleans' 2025 second-round pick and New Orleans will retain the Lakers' pick.) (from New Orleans)
August 7	To New Orleans Pelicans: Devonte' Graham (sign-and-trade) (from Charlotte); Jonas Valančiūnas (from Memphis); Draft rights to Trey Murphy III (No. 17) (from Memphis); Draft rights to Brandon Boston Jr. (No. 51) (Note: New Orleans traded Boston's rights to the LA Clippers later the same day.) (from Memphis)	
August 7	To Memphis Grizzlies: Draft rights to Santi Aldama (No. 30)	To Utah Jazz: Draft rights to Jared Butler (No. 40) (Note: Memphis received Butler's rights from New Orleans earlier the same day.); 2022 MEM second-round pick (Note: Utah traded this pick to Portland on February 9, 2022.); 2026 MEM second-round pick (Note: Utah received this earlier in the day as an unprotected pick; they traded it with protection to Golden State later the same day and will retain the pick if it is No. 31–42.)
August 7	To Los Angeles Clippers: Draft rights to Brandon Boston Jr. (No. 51) (Note: New Orleans received Boston's rights from Memphis earlier the same day.)	To New Orleans Pelicans: 2022 SAC protected second-round pick (Note: New Orleans will receive the pick if it is No. 56–60, otherwise they receive nothing. The pick fell within its protected range and was not conveyed.); Cash considerations
August 7	To Chicago Bulls: Cash considerations	To Houston Rockets: Daniel Theis (sign-and-trade)
August 7	To Golden State Warriors: 2026 MEM protected second-round pick (Note: Golden State will receive the pick if it is No. 43–60, otherwise they receive nothing. Utah received the unprotected pick from Memphis earlier in the day and will retain the pick if it is No. 31-42.)	To Utah Jazz: Eric Paschall
August 7	To Indiana Pacers: 2023 SAS protected second-round pick (Note: Indiana will receive the pick if it is No. 56–60, otherwise they receive nothing.)	To San Antonio Spurs: Doug McDermott (sign-and-trade); 2023 IND protected second-round pick (Note: San Antonio will receive the pick if it is No. 56–60, otherwise they receive nothing. Indiana traded the No. 31–55 portion of this pick to Sacramento on February 8, 2022.); 2026 second-round pick swap right (Note: San Antonio has the right to swap its own pick for the worse of the picks originally belonging to Indiana and Miami.)
August 7	Three-team trade	
August 7	To Atlanta Hawks: Delon Wright (from Sacramento)	To Boston Celtics: Kris Dunn (from Atlanta); Bruno Fernando (from Atlanta); 2023 POR second-round pick (from Atlanta)
August 7	To Sacramento Kings: Tristan Thompson (from Boston)	
August 7	To Memphis Grizzlies: Sam Merrill; 2024 second-round pick (Note: The second best of the picks originally belonging to Cleveland, Indiana, and Utah. Milwaukee previously received this pick in a trade on July 30.); 2026 second-round pick (Note: The better of the picks originally belonging to Indiana and Miami. Milwaukee previously received this pick in a trade on July 30.)	To Milwaukee Bucks: Grayson Allen
August 8	To Chicago Bulls: Lonzo Ball (sign-and-trade)	To New Orleans Pelicans: Tomáš Satoranský; Garrett Temple (sign-and-trade); 2024 CHI second-round pick; Cash considerations
August 11	To Chicago Bulls: DeMar DeRozan (sign-and-trade)	To San Antonio Spurs: Al-Farouq Aminu; Thaddeus Young; 2022 second-round pick (Note: Before this trade, Chicago had the right to trade its pick for Detroit's, with the worse of the two going to Sacramento; San Antonio could then swap the Lakers' pick for the better of Chicago/Detroit, leaving Chicago with the remaining pick. The pick traded here was the one Chicago would have ended up with after the swap rights were done. San Antonio traded the better of the Chicago and Detroit picks to Toronto on February 10, 2022.); 2025 CHI protected first-round pick (Note: Chicago already owes its protected 2023 first-round pick to Orlando, which will convert to two second-round picks if not conveyed by 2024. Because teams cannot trade future first-round picks in consecutive years, San Antonio may not be able to receive the pick until at least 2026. In the first eligible year, San Antonio will receive the pick if it is No. 11–30, in the second or third year (2026 and 2027 or 2027 and 2028) if No. 9–30, after which it will convert to Chicago's 2028 second-round pick.); 2025 CHI second-round pick
August 16	To Los Angeles Clippers: Eric Bledsoe	To Memphis Grizzlies: Patrick Beverley; Daniel Oturu; Rajon Rondo
August 17	To Boston Celtics: Cash considerations	To New York Knicks: Evan Fournier (sign-and-trade); 2022 CHA protected second-round pick (Note: New York will receive the pick if it is No. 56–60, otherwise they receive nothing. The pick within its protected range and was not conveyed.); 2023 second-round pick (Note: Oklahoma City has the right to swap Dallas's pick for Miami's, leaving Oklahoma City with its own pick, Washington's pick, and the better of Dallas/Miami; New York will receive the worst of the three picks. This is the pick Boston received from Oklahoma City on June 18.)
August 25	To Memphis Grizzlies: Jarrett Culver; Juancho Hernangómez	To Minnesota Timberwolves: Patrick Beverley
August 28	Three-team trade	
August 28	To Chicago Bulls: Derrick Jones Jr. (from Portland); 2022 POR protected first-round pick (from Portland) (Note: Chicago will receive the pick if it is No. 15–30, rolling over with the same condition through 2028; if the pick is not conveyed by 2028, Chicago will receive Portland's 2028 second-round pick. It is possible the 2028 pick would be Chicago's, in which case it will be forfeited for tampering in the DeMar DeRozan trade.); 2023 DEN protected second-round pick (Note: Chicago will receive the pick if it is No. 47–60, otherwise they receive nothing. If Chicago receives the pick, it will be forfeited for tampering in the Lonzo Ball sign-and-trade as they have already traded away their own picks through 2025.) (from Cleveland)	To Cleveland Cavaliers: Lauri Markkanen (sign-and-trade) (from Chicago)
August 28	To Portland Trail Blazers: Larry Nance Jr. (from Cleveland)	
September
September 4	To Brooklyn Nets: Sekou Doumbouya; Jahlil Okafor	To Detroit Pistons: DeAndre Jordan; 2022 BKN second-round pick (Note: This pick was included in the January 10 Denver-Detroit trade that was later voided.); 2024 second-round pick (Note: The better of the picks originally belonging to Memphis and Washington. Brooklyn received this pick in the five-team trade on August 6.); 2025 second-round pick (Note: This is the pick originally belonging to Golden State; Detroit has the right to swap it for Washington's pick. Brooklyn received this pick in the five-team trade on August 6.); 2027 BKN second-round pick; Cash considerations
September 10	To Los Angeles Lakers: Draft rights to Wang Zhelin (2016 No. 57)	To Memphis Grizzlies: Marc Gasol; 2024 LAL second-round pick; Cash considerations
September 15	To Boston Celtics: Juancho Hernangómez	To Memphis Grizzlies: Kris Dunn; Carsen Edwards; 2026 right to swap second-round picks (Note: Memphis may swap the better of the picks originally belonging to Indiana and Miami for Boston's own pick. The NBA.com article states Dallas and Miami, but Dallas's pick is owned by Oklahoma City.)
October
October 6	To Brooklyn Nets: Cash considerations	To Houston Rockets: Sekou Doumbouya; 2024 BKN second-round pick
October 6	To Brooklyn Nets: Edmond Sumner; 2025 MIA protected second-round pick (Note: Brooklyn will receive the pick if it is No. 38–60, otherwise Indiana will retain the pick and Brooklyn receives nothing.)	To Indiana Pacers: Draft rights to Juan Pablo Vaulet (2015 No. 39)
January
January 3	Three-team trade	
January 3	To Cleveland Cavaliers: Rajon Rondo (from LA Lakers)	To Los Angeles Lakers: Draft rights to Louis Labeyrie (2014 No. 57) (from New York)
January 3	To New York Knicks: Denzel Valentine (from Cleveland); Draft rights to Brad Newley (2007 No. 54) (from LA Lakers); Draft rights to Wang Zhelin (2016 No. 57) (from LA Lakers); Cash considerations (from LA Lakers)	
January 4	To Oklahoma City Thunder: Miye Oni; 2028 UTA second-round pick (Note: Oklahoma City received Utah's future protected first-round pick for Derrick Favors on July 30, 2021; if the Thunder hadn't received Utah's first-round pick by 2026, it would have converted to this pick. With this trade, Utah's obligation on its first-round pick will be extinguished after 2026.)	To Utah Jazz: Cash considerations
January 10 (trade voided)	To Detroit Pistons: Bol Bol	To Denver Nuggets: Rodney McGruder; 2022 BKN second-round pick
January 13	To Atlanta Hawks: Kevin Knox II; 2022 CHA protected first-round pick (Note: Atlanta will receive the pick if it is No. 19–30 in 2022, No. 17–30 in 2023, No. 15–30 in 2024, No. 15–30 in 2025; if the Hawks have not received the pick by 2025, it will convert to Charlotte's 2026 and 2027 second-round picks. The pick fell within its protected range in 2022 and rolled over to 2023.)	To New York Knicks: Solomon Hill; Cam Reddish; 2025 BKN second-round pick; Cash considerations
January 19	Three-team trade	
January 19	To Boston Celtics: Bol Bol (from Denver); PJ Dozier (from Denver)	To Denver Nuggets: Bryn Forbes (from San Antonio)
January 19	To San Antonio Spurs: Juancho Hernangómez (from Boston); 2028 DEN protected second-round pick (Note: San Antonio will receive the pick if it is No. 34–60, otherwise they receive nothing.) (from Denver); Cash considerations (from Boston); Cash considerations (from Denver)	
February
February 4	To Los Angeles Clippers: Robert Covington; Norman Powell	To Portland Trail Blazers: Eric Bledsoe; Keon Johnson; Justise Winslow; 2025 DET second-round pick
February 7	To Cleveland Cavaliers: Caris LeVert; 2022 MIA second-round pick	To Indiana Pacers: Ricky Rubio; 2022 CLE protected first-round pick (Note: Indiana will receive the pick in 2022 if it is No. 15–30, in 2023 if it is No. 15–30; if Indiana doesn't receive the pick by 2023, it will convert to Cleveland's 2025 second-round pick and the L.A. Lakers' 2026 second-round pick.); 2022 HOU second-round pick; 2027 UTA second-round pick
February 8	To Indiana Pacers: Tyrese Haliburton; Buddy Hield; Tristan Thompson	To Sacramento Kings: Justin Holiday; Jeremy Lamb; Domantas Sabonis; 2023 IND second-round pick (Note: Sacramento will receive the pick if it is No. 31–55, otherwise they receive nothing.)
February 8	To New Orleans Pelicans: CJ McCollum; Larry Nance Jr.; Tony Snell	To Portland Trail Blazers: Nickeil Alexander-Walker; Josh Hart; Didi Louzada; Tomáš Satoranský; 2022 protected first-round pick (Note: Portland will receive the pick if it is No. 5–14; if the pick is not conveyed, Portland will instead receive Milwaukee's 2025 first-round pick if No. 5–30, otherwise receiving nothing.); 2026 second-round pick (Note: The better of the picks originally belonging to New Orleans and Portland; not a swap because New Orleans already owned Portland's pick.); 2027 NOP second-round pick
February 9	To Miami Heat: 2026 second-round pick (Note: The worst of the three picks originally belonging to Dallas, Oklahoma City, and Philadelphia.)	To Oklahoma City Thunder: KZ Okpala; 2023 MIA protected first-round pick deferred to 2025 (Note: Oklahoma City will now receive the pick in 2025 if it is No. 15–30, otherwise they will receive Miami's 2026 unprotected first-round pick.)
February 9	Three-team trade	
February 9	To Portland Trail Blazers: Elijah Hughes (from Utah); Joe Ingles (from Utah); 2022 MEM second-round pick (from Utah)	To San Antonio Spurs: Tomáš Satoranský (from Portland); 2027 second-round pick (Note: The worst of the four picks originally belonging to Houston, Indiana, Miami, and Oklahoma City.) (from Utah)
February 9	To Utah Jazz: Nickeil Alexander-Walker (from Portland); Juancho Hernangómez (from San Antonio)	
February 10	To Boston Celtics: Daniel Theis	To Houston Rockets: Bruno Fernando; Enes Kanter Freedom; Dennis Schröder
February 10	To Boston Celtics: 2023 ORL protected second-round pick (Note: Boston will receive the pick if it is No. 56–60, otherwise they receive nothing.)	To Orlando Magic: Bol Bol; PJ Dozier; 2028 BOS protected second-round pick (Note: Orlando will receive the pick if it is No. 46–60, otherwise they receive nothing.); Cash considerations
February 10	To Boston Celtics: Derrick White	To San Antonio Spurs: Romeo Langford; Josh Richardson; 2022 BOS protected first-round pick (Note: San Antonio will receive the pick if it is No. 5–30, in 2023 if No. 5–30; if the pick is not conveyed by 2023, San Antonio will receive Portland's 2023 second-round pick and the better of 1) the 2023 second-round pick originally belonging to Houston (if No. 33–60) or 2) the worse of the picks originally belonging to Dallas and Miami. San Antonio received the pick.); 2028 protected first-round pick swap right (Note: If Boston's pick is No. 1, San Antonio will instead receive Boston's second-round pick if it is No. 31–45, otherwise receiving nothing.)
February 10	To Brooklyn Nets: Seth Curry; Andre Drummond; Ben Simmons; 2022 PHI first-round pick (Note: Brooklyn had the right to defer this pick to 2023. Brooklyn exercised its deferral right and Philadelphia retained the 2022 pick.); 2027 PHI protected first-round pick (Note: Brooklyn will receive the pick if it is No. 9–30, in 2028 if it is No. 9–30; if the pick is not conveyed by 2028 it will convert to Philadelphia's 2028 second-round pick.)	To Philadelphia 76ers: James Harden; Paul Millsap
February 10	To Charlotte Hornets: Montrezl Harrell	To Washington Wizards: Vernon Carey Jr.; Ish Smith; 2023 BOS protected second-round pick (Note: Washington will receive the pick if it is No. 46–60; if the pick is not conveyed in 2023, Washington will receive Boston's 2024 second-round pick.)
February 10	To Dallas Mavericks: Dāvis Bertāns; Spencer Dinwiddie	To Washington Wizards: Kristaps Porziņģis; 2022 DAL protected second-round pick (Note: New York will receive the pick in 2022 if it is No. 46–60, otherwise they receive nothing. Washington received the pick.)
February 10	To Indiana Pacers: Jalen Smith; 2022 PHO second-round pick	To Phoenix Suns: Torrey Craig; Cash considerations
February 10	To Phoenix Suns: Aaron Holiday	To Washington Wizards: Cash considerations
February 10	To San Antonio Spurs: Goran Dragić; 2022 protected first-round pick (Note: San Antonio will receive in 2022 if it is No. 15–30, in 2023 if it is No. 14–30; if the pick is not conveyed by 2023, it will convert to Toronto's second-round picks in 2023 and 2026.)	To Toronto Raptors: Drew Eubanks; Thaddeus Young; 2022 second-round pick (Note: The better of the picks originally belonging to Chicago and Detroit.)
February 10	Four-team trade	
February 10	To Detroit Pistons: Marvin Bagley III (from Sacramento)	To Los Angeles Clippers: Rodney Hood (from Milwaukee); Semi Ojeleye (from Milwaukee); Draft rights to Vanja Marinković (2019 No. 60) (from Sacramento)
February 10	To Milwaukee Bucks: Serge Ibaka (from LA Clippers); 2023 second-round pick (Note: The worse of the picks originally belonging to Cleveland and Golden State.) (from Detroit); 2024 POR second-round pick (from Detroit); Cash considerations	To Sacramento Kings: Donte DiVincenzo (from Milwaukee); Josh Jackson (from Detroit); Trey Lyles (from Detroit); Draft rights to David Michineau (2016 No. 39) (from LA Clippers); 2024 SAC second-round pick (Note: The Kings got their own pick back.) (from Detroit)

=== Free agents ===
The NBA's free agency period began on August 2 at 6 P.M. EST.

Players would be allowed to sign new offers starting on August 6 at 12 p.m. ET, after the moratorium ended.

^{R}	Denotes unsigned players whose free-agent rights were renounced
	Denotes sign and trade players
	Denotes player who is signed after buyout
	Denotes signed player who failed to make opening day roster
	Denotes player whose deal was later turned into a two-way contract
	Denotes player signed to 10-day contract

Player	Date signed	New team	Former team	Ref
Andre Drummond	August 4	Philadelphia 76ers	Los Angeles Lakers	
Cody Zeller	August 4	Portland Trail Blazers	Charlotte Hornets	
Solomon Hill	August 5	Atlanta Hawks		
Keifer Sykes	August 5	Indiana Pacers	South East Melbourne Phoenix (Australia)	
Terry Taylor	August 5	Indiana Pacers	Austin Peay (Undrafted in 2021)	
Jarrett Allen (RFA)	August 6	Cleveland Cavaliers		
Carmelo Anthony	August 6	Los Angeles Lakers	Portland Trail Blazers	
Trevor Ariza	August 6	Los Angeles Lakers	Miami Heat	
Kent Bazemore	August 6	Los Angeles Lakers	Golden State Warriors	
Khem Birch	August 6	Toronto Raptors		
Nemanja Bjelica	August 6	Golden State Warriors	Miami Heat	
Reggie Bullock	August 6	Dallas Mavericks	New York Knicks	
John Collins (RFA)	August 6	Atlanta Hawks		
Mike Conley Jr.	August 6	Utah Jazz		
Terence Davis (RFA)	August 6	Sacramento Kings		
Dewayne Dedmon	August 6	Miami Heat		
Spencer Dinwiddie	August 6	Washington Wizards	Brooklyn Nets	
Wayne Ellington	August 6	Los Angeles Lakers	Detroit Pistons	
Rudy Gay	August 6	Utah Jazz	San Antonio Spurs	
Devonte' Graham (RFA)	August 6	New Orleans Pelicans	Charlotte Hornets	
George Hill	August 6	Milwaukee Bucks	Philadelphia 76ers (Waived on August 3)	
Richaun Holmes	August 6	Sacramento Kings		
Rodney Hood	August 6	Milwaukee Bucks	Toronto Raptors (Waived on August 3)	
Talen Horton-Tucker (RFA)	August 6	Los Angeles Lakers		
Dwight Howard	August 6	Los Angeles Lakers	Philadelphia 76ers	
James Johnson	August 6	Brooklyn Nets	New Orleans Pelicans	
Saben Lee (RFA)	August 6	Detroit Pistons (Previously on a two-way contract)		
Robin Lopez	August 6	Orlando Magic	Washington Wizards	
Kyle Lowry	August 6	Miami Heat	Toronto Raptors	
Trey Lyles	August 6	Detroit Pistons	San Antonio Spurs	
Ben McLemore	August 6	Portland Trail Blazers	Los Angeles Lakers	
T. J. McConnell	August 6	Indiana Pacers		
Malik Monk	August 6	Los Angeles Lakers	Charlotte Hornets	
Markieff Morris	August 6	Miami Heat	Los Angeles Lakers	
Abdel Nader	August 6	Phoenix Suns		
Raul Neto	August 6	Washington Wizards		
Georges Niang	August 6	Philadelphia 76ers	Utah Jazz	
Kendrick Nunn	August 6	Los Angeles Lakers	Miami Heat	
Semi Ojeleye	August 6	Milwaukee Bucks	Boston Celtics	
Kelly Olynyk	August 6	Detroit Pistons	Houston Rockets	
Chris Paul*	August 6	Phoenix Suns		
Cameron Payne	August 6	Phoenix Suns		
Otto Porter Jr.	August 6	Golden State Warriors	Orlando Magic	
Bobby Portis*	August 6	Milwaukee Bucks		
Norman Powell	August 6	Portland Trail Blazers		
Duncan Robinson (RFA)	August 6	Miami Heat		
Max Strus (RFA)	August 6	Miami Heat (Previously on a two-way contract)		
Gabe Vincent (RFA)	August 6	Miami Heat (Previously on a two-way contract)		
Hassan Whiteside	August 6	Utah Jazz	Sacramento Kings	
Lou Williams	August 6	Atlanta Hawks		
Ömer Yurtseven**	August 6	Miami Heat		
Jarrell Brantley (RFA)	August 7	Utah Jazz (Previously on a two-way contract)		
D. J. Carton	August 7	Charlotte Hornets	Marquette (Undrafted in 2021)	
Danny Green	August 7	Philadelphia 76ers		
Maurice Harkless	August 7	Sacramento Kings		
Doug McDermott	August 7	San Antonio Spurs	Indiana Pacers	
Victor Oladipo	August 7	Miami Heat		
Kelly Oubre Jr.	August 7	Charlotte Hornets	Golden State Warriors	
Ish Smith	August 7	Charlotte Hornets	Washington Wizards	
Daniel Theis	August 7	Houston Rockets	Chicago Bulls	
Gary Trent Jr. (RFA)	August 7	Toronto Raptors		
P. J. Tucker	August 7	Miami Heat	Milwaukee Bucks	
Ish Wainright	August 7	Toronto Raptors	SIG Strasbourg (France)	
Justise Winslow**	August 7	Los Angeles Clippers	Memphis Grizzlies	
Lonzo Ball (RFA)	August 8	Chicago Bulls	New Orleans Pelicans	
DeAndre' Bembry	August 8	Brooklyn Nets	Toronto Raptors (Waived on August 3)	
Bruce Brown (RFA)	August 8	Brooklyn Nets		
David Duke Jr.	August 8	Brooklyn Nets	Providence (Undrafted in 2021)	
Jay Huff	August 8	Washington Wizards	Virginia (Undrafted in 2021)	
David Nwaba	August 8	Houston Rockets		
Garrett Temple	August 8	New Orleans Pelicans	Chicago Bulls	
Sterling Brown	August 9	Dallas Mavericks	Houston Rockets	
Sam Dekker	August 9	Toronto Raptors	Türk Telekom (Turkey)	
Gorgui Dieng	August 9	Atlanta Hawks	San Antonio Spurs	
Blake Griffin	August 9	Brooklyn Nets		
Tim Hardaway Jr.	August 9	Dallas Mavericks		
Frank Kaminsky	August 9	Phoenix Suns		
Furkan Korkmaz	August 9	Philadelphia 76ers		
Boban Marjanović	August 9	Dallas Mavericks		
Nerlens Noel	August 9	New York Knicks		
Yves Pons	August 9	Memphis Grizzlies	Tennessee (Undrafted in 2021)	
Chaundee Brown	August 10	Los Angeles Lakers	Michigan (Undrafted in 2021)	
Alex Caruso	August 10	Chicago Bulls	Los Angeles Lakers	
Andre Iguodala**	August 10	Golden State Warriors	Miami Heat	
Frank Jackson (RFA)	August 10	Detroit Pistons (Previously on a two-way contract)		
Reggie Jackson	August 10	Los Angeles Clippers		
Cory Joseph	August 10	Detroit Pistons (Waived on July 31)		
Mac McClung	August 10	Los Angeles Lakers	Texas Tech (Undrafted in 2021)	
Rodney McGruder	August 10	Detroit Pistons (Waived on August 6)		
Patty Mills	August 10	Brooklyn Nets	San Antonio Spurs	
Elfrid Payton	August 10	Phoenix Suns	New York Knicks	
Tony Snell	August 10	Portland Trail Blazers	Atlanta Hawks	
Kemba Walker	August 10	New York Knicks	Oklahoma City Thunder (Waived on August 6)	
Will Barton	August 11	Denver Nuggets		
Isaac Bonga	August 11	Toronto Raptors	Washington Wizards	
Tony Bradley	August 11	Chicago Bulls	Oklahoma City Thunder	
Zach Collins	August 11	San Antonio Spurs	Portland Trail Blazers	
DeMar DeRozan	August 11	Chicago Bulls	San Antonio Spurs	
Javonte Green (RFA)	August 11	Chicago Bulls		
Jeff Green	August 11	Denver Nuggets	Brooklyn Nets	
Johnny Hamilton	August 11	Atlanta Hawks	Fenerbahçe (Turkey)	
Mike Muscala	August 11	Oklahoma City Thunder		
Thanasis Antetokounmpo	August 12	Milwaukee Bucks		
Kawhi Leonard*	August 12	Los Angeles Clippers		
Nicolas Batum	August 13	Los Angeles Clippers		
Enes Kanter	August 13	Boston Celtics	Portland Trail Blazers	
Alex Len	August 13	Sacramento Kings	Washington Wizards	
Didi Louzada** (RFA)	August 13	New Orleans Pelicans		
Dennis Schröder	August 13	Boston Celtics	Los Angeles Lakers	
MaCio Teague	August 14	Utah Jazz	Baylor (Undrafted in 2021)	
Udonis Haslem	August 15	Miami Heat		
Evan Fournier	August 16	New York Knicks	Boston Celtics	
Willy Hernangómez	August 16	New Orleans Pelicans		
JaVale McGee	August 16	Phoenix Suns	Denver Nuggets	
Jamorko Pickett	August 16	Detroit Pistons	Georgetown (Undrafted in 2021)	
D. J. Stewart Jr.	August 16	Miami Heat	Mississippi State (Undrafted in 2021)	
Alec Burks	August 17	New York Knicks		
Taj Gibson	August 17	New York Knicks		
Derrick Rose	August 17	New York Knicks		
Dwayne Bacon	August 18	New York Knicks	Orlando Magic (Waived on August 8)	
Jordan Goodwin	August 18	Washington Wizards	Saint Louis (Undrafted in 2021)	
JaMychal Green*	August 18	Denver Nuggets		
Josh Hart (RFA)	August 18	New Orleans Pelicans		
Feron Hunt	August 18	Dallas Mavericks	Southern Methodist (Undrafted in 2021)	
Carlik Jones	August 18	Dallas Mavericks	Louisville (Undrafted in 2021)	
A. J. Lawson	August 18	Atlanta Hawks	South Carolina (Undrafted in 2021)	
EJ Onu	August 18	Dallas Mavericks	Shawnee State (Undrafted in 2021)	
Aamir Simms	August 18	New York Knicks	Clemson (Undrafted in 2021)	
Hamidou Diallo (RFA)	August 19	Detroit Pistons		
Jaime Echenique	August 19	Washington Wizards	Acunsa GBC (Spain)	
Jock Landale	August 19	San Antonio Spurs	Melbourne United (Australia)	
Torrey Craig	August 20	Indiana Pacers	Phoenix Suns	
M. J. Walker	August 20	New York Knicks	Florida State (Undrafted in 2021)	
Moritz Wagner	August 23	Orlando Magic		
Tyler Bey	August 24	Houston Rockets	Dallas Mavericks (Previously on a two-way contract)	
Daishen Nix	August 24	Houston Rockets	NBA G League Ignite (NBA G League)	
Bryn Forbes*	August 25	San Antonio Spurs	Milwaukee Bucks	
Armoni Brooks (RFA)	August 26	Houston Rockets (Previously on a two-way contract)		
Lauri Markkanen	August 28	Cleveland Cavaliers	Chicago Bulls	
Sviatoslav Mykhailiuk	August 31	Toronto Raptors	Oklahoma City Thunder	
Austin Rivers	August 31	Denver Nuggets		
Rajon Rondo	August 31	Los Angeles Lakers	Memphis Grizzlies (Waived on August 28)	
Dennis Smith Jr.	September 1	Portland Trail Blazers	Detroit Pistons	
George King	September 2	Los Angeles Clippers	Chemnitz 99 (Germany)	
LaMarcus Aldridge	September 3	Brooklyn Nets (Came out of retirement)		
Marquese Chriss	September 3	Portland Trail Blazers	San Antonio Spurs (Waived on March 28)	
Matt Thomas	September 4	Chicago Bulls	Utah Jazz (Waived on August 1)	
Alize Johnson	September 6	Chicago Bulls	Brooklyn Nets (Waived on September 3)	
Stanley Johnson	September 6	Chicago Bulls	Toronto Raptors	
Trevon Scott	September 6	Cleveland Cavaliers	Salt Lake City Stars (NBA G League)	
Ethan Thompson	September 6	Chicago Bulls	Oregon (Undrafted in 2021)	
Keita Bates-Diop (RFA)	September 7	San Antonio Spurs (Previously on a two-way contract)		
Tyler Cook	September 7	Chicago Bulls	Detroit Pistons (Waived on July 31)	
Jeff Dowtin	September 7	Orlando Magic	Lakeland Magic (NBA G League)	
Harry Giles	September 7	Los Angeles Clippers	Portland Trail Blazers	
Hassani Gravett	September 7	Orlando Magic	MZT Skopje Aerodrom (North Macedonia)	
Nate Hinton	September 7	Indiana Pacers	Dallas Mavericks (Waived on August 27; previously on a two-way contract)	
Jon Teske	September 7	Orlando Magic	Filou Oostende (Belgium)	
Tremont Waters	September 7	Milwaukee Bucks	Boston Celtics (Previously on a two-way contract)	
Moses Wright	September 7	Los Angeles Clippers	Georgia Tech (Undrafted in 2021)	
Mitch Ballock	September 8	Cleveland Cavaliers	Creighton (Undrafted in 2021)	
Tacko Fall	September 8	Cleveland Cavaliers	Boston Celtics (Previously on a two-way contract)	
RJ Nembhard	September 8	Cleveland Cavaliers	TCU (Undrafted in 2021)	
Emanuel Terry	September 8	Sacramento Kings	Agua Caliente Clippers (NBA G League)	
DeAndre Jordan	September 9	Los Angeles Lakers	Detroit Pistons (Waived on September 6)	
Timothé Luwawu-Cabarrot	September 9	Atlanta Hawks	Brooklyn Nets	
E'Twaun Moore	September 9	Orlando Magic	Phoenix Suns	
Patrick Patterson	September 9	Portland Trail Blazers	Los Angeles Clippers	
Paul Millsap	September 10	Brooklyn Nets	Denver Nuggets	
Micah Potter	September 10	Miami Heat	Wisconsin (Undrafted in 2021)	
Javonte Smart	September 10	Miami Heat	LSU (Undrafted in 2021)	
Dru Smith	September 10	Miami Heat	Missouri (Undrafted in 2021)	
Derrick Alston Jr.	September 13	Utah Jazz	Boise State (Undrafted in 2021)	
Isaiah Hartenstein*	September 13	Los Angeles Clippers	Cleveland Cavaliers	
Jordan McLaughlin (RFA)	September 14	Minnesota Timberwolves		
Juwan Morgan	September 14	Boston Celtics	Utah Jazz	
Jarred Vanderbilt (RFA)	September 15	Minnesota Timberwolves		
Frank Ntilikina	September 16	Dallas Mavericks	New York Knicks	
Anthony Tarke	September 16	Detroit Pistons	Coppin State (Undrafted in 2021)	
Dante Exum	September 17	Houston Rockets		
Kevin Pangos	September 17	Cleveland Cavaliers	Zenit Saint Petersburg (Russia)	
Jordan Schakel	September 18	Washington Wizards	San Diego State (Undrafted in 2021)	
Brian Bowen	September 20	Minnesota Timberwolves	Indiana Pacers (Waived on April 23; previously on a two-way contract)	
Devontae Cacok	September 20	Brooklyn Nets	Los Angeles Lakers (Previously on a two-way contract)	
Matt Lewis	September 20	Minnesota Timberwolves	James Madison (Undrafted in 2021)	
Isaiah Miller	September 20	Minnesota Timberwolves	UNC Greensboro (Undrafted in 2021)	
Chris Silva	September 20	Minnesota Timberwolves	Sacramento Kings (Waived on April 28)	
Xavier Sneed	September 20	Charlotte Hornets	Niagara River Lions (Canada)	
Quinn Cook	September 21	Portland Trail Blazers	Cleveland Cavaliers (Last 10-day contract ended April 1)	
Jahlil Okafor	September 21	Atlanta Hawks	Brooklyn Nets (Waived on September 9)	
Reggie Perry	September 21	Toronto Raptors	Brooklyn Nets (Previously on a two-way contract)	
Admiral Schofield	September 21	Orlando Magic	Greensboro Swarm (NBA G League)	
Jordan Ford	September 22	Los Angeles Clippers	Peristeri (Greece)	
Chasson Randle	September 22	Phoenix Suns	Orlando Magic (Previously on a two-way contract)	
Denzel Valentine	September 22	Cleveland Cavaliers	Chicago Bulls	
Tarik Black	September 23	Denver Nuggets	Zenit Saint Petersburg (Russia)	
Shaq Buchanan	September 23	Memphis Grizzlies	Memphis Hustle (NBA G League)	
Zylan Cheatham	September 23	New Orleans Pelicans	Iowa Wolves (NBA G League)	
Matt Coleman III	September 23	Sacramento Kings	Texas (Undrafted in 2021)	
Javin DeLaurier	September 23	Milwaukee Bucks	Niagara River Lions (Canada)	
Jared Harper	September 23	New Orleans Pelicans	New York Knicks (Previously on a two-way contract)	
Sean McDermott	September 23	Memphis Grizzlies (Waived on August 25; previously on a two-way contract)		
Theo Pinson	September 23	Boston Celtics	New York Knicks (Previously on a two-way contract)	
Wayne Selden Jr.	September 23	New York Knicks	Ironi Ness Ziona (Israel)	
Luka Garza	September 24	Detroit Pistons (Previously on a two-way contract)		
Langston Galloway	September 25	Golden State Warriors	Phoenix Suns	
Kyle Guy	September 25	Cleveland Cavaliers	Sacramento Kings (Previously on a two-way contract)	
D. J. Steward	September 25	Sacramento Kings	Duke (Undrafted in 2021)	
Jordan Bell	September 26	Golden State Warriors (Previously on a two-way contract)		
Avery Bradley**	September 26	Golden State Warriors	Houston Rockets	
Mamadi Diakite	September 26	Oklahoma City Thunder (Claimed off waivers)	Milwaukee Bucks (Waived on September 24)	
Rob Edwards	September 26	Oklahoma City Thunder	Oklahoma City Blue (NBA G League)	
Daniel Oturu	September 26	Chicago Bulls	Memphis Grizzlies (Waived on September 23)	
D. J. Wilson	September 26	Oklahoma City Thunder	Houston Rockets	
Ryan Arcidiacono**	September 27	Boston Celtics	Chicago Bulls	
Shaquille Harrison	September 27	Philadelphia 76ers	Denver Nuggets (Previously on a two-way contract)	
Garrison Mathews	September 27	Boston Celtics	Washington Wizards (Previously on a two-way contract)	
Austin Reaves	September 27	Los Angeles Lakers (Previously on a two-way contract)		
Davon Reed	September 27	Denver Nuggets	Taoyuan Pilots (Taiwan)	
Matt Ryan	September 27	Denver Nuggets	Chattanooga (Undrafted in 2020)	
Deividas Sirvydis	September 27	Detroit Pistons (Waived on July 31)		
Cassius Stanley	September 27	Detroit Pistons	Indiana Pacers (Previously on a two-way contract)	
Derrick Walton	September 27	Detroit Pistons	LDLC ASVEL (France)	
Marques Bolden	September 28	Utah Jazz	Canton Charge (NBA G League)	
Malik Fitts	September 28	Utah Jazz	Los Angeles Clippers (Last 10-day contract ended April 19)	
Johnny O'Bryant III	September 28	Milwaukee Bucks	Türk Telekom (Turkey)	
Cameron Oliver	September 28	Los Angeles Lakers	Cairns Taipans (Australia)	
Elijah Bryant	September 29	Milwaukee Bucks (Waived on September 26)		
Jared Cunningham	September 29	Detroit Pistons	Bnei Rav-Bariach Herzliya (Israel)	
Haywood Highsmith	September 29	Philadelphia 76ers	Vanoli Cremona (Italy)	
Trevelin Queen	September 29	Los Angeles Lakers	Rio Grande Valley Vipers (NBA G League)	
Aric Holman	October 1	San Antonio Spurs	ratiopharm Ulm (Germany)	
Nate Renfro	October 1	San Antonio Spurs	Austin Spurs (NBA G League)	
Brad Wanamaker	October 6	Indiana Pacers	Charlotte Hornets	
DaQuan Jeffries	October 7	Atlanta Hawks	San Antonio Spurs	
Denzel Mahoney	October 7	San Antonio Spurs	Creighton (Undrafted in 2021)	
Jaylen Morris	October 7	San Antonio Spurs	Austin Spurs (NBA G League)	
Jeremiah Tilmon	October 7	Orlando Magic	Missouri (Undrafted in 2021)	
Jalen Crutcher	October 8	Charlotte Hornets	Dayton (Undrafted in 2021)	
Tyler Hall	October 8	New York Knicks	Westchester Knicks (NBA G League)	
Cameron McGriff	October 8	Charlotte Hornets	Okapi Aalst (Belgium)	
Romeo Weems	October 8	Memphis Grizzlies	DePaul (Undrafted in 2021)	
James Banks III	October 9	New Orleans Pelicans	Hapoel Be'er Sheva (Israel)	
Malcolm Hill	October 9	New Orleans Pelicans	Hapoel Bank Yahav Jerusalem (Israel)	
Giorgi Bezhanishvili	October 10	Denver Nuggets	Illinois (Undrafted in 2021)	
Bryce Brown	October 10	Brooklyn Nets	Westchester Knicks (NBA G League)	
Josh Gray	October 10	Brooklyn Nets	Fort Wayne Mad Ants (NBA G League)	
Quinndary Weatherspoon	October 10	Golden State Warriors	San Antonio Spurs (Previously on a two-way contract)	
Jordan Bowden	October 11	Brooklyn Nets	Long Island Nets (NBA G League)	
Jaylen Hoard	October 11	Oklahoma City Thunder (Previously on a two-way contract)		
Jemerrio Jones	October 11	Milwaukee Bucks	Delaware Blue Coats (NBA G League)	
Brandon Rachal	October 11	Brooklyn Nets	Tulsa (Undrafted in 2021)	
Bryce Alford	October 12	Chicago Bulls	Benfica (Portugal)	
Jared Brownridge	October 12	Philadelphia 76ers	Delaware Blue Coats (NBA G League)	
Jordan Burns	October 12	San Antonio Spurs	Colgate (Undrafted in 2021)	
Devin Cannady	October 12	Orlando Magic (Waived on May 4; previously on a two-way contract)		
Damyean Dotson	October 12	San Antonio Spurs	Cleveland Cavaliers (Waived on September 10)	
Melvin Frazier	October 12	Oklahoma City Thunder	Oklahoma City Blue (NBA G League)	
Justin James	October 12	Cleveland Cavaliers	Utah Jazz (Waived on October 1; previously on a two-way contract)	
Damien Jefferson	October 12	Sacramento Kings	Creighton (Undrafted in 2021)	
Braxton Key	October 12	Philadelphia 76ers	Delaware Blue Coats (NBA G League)	
Ade Murkey	October 12	Sacramento Kings	Iowa Wolves (NBA G League)	
Myles Powell	October 12	New York Knicks (Waived on April 24; previously on a two-way contract)		
Rayjon Tucker	October 12	Milwaukee Bucks	Philadelphia 76ers (Waived on August 18; previously on a two-way contract)	
Ibi Watson	October 12	Atlanta Hawks	Dayton (Undrafted in 2021)	
Alex Antetokounmpo	October 13	Toronto Raptors	UCAM Murcia (Spain)	
Ed Davis	October 13	Cleveland Cavaliers	Minnesota Timberwolves	
L. J. Figueroa	October 13	Golden State Warriors	Leones de Santo Domingo (Dominican Republic)	
Marcus Foster	October 13	Houston Rockets	Türk Telekom B.K. (Turkey)	
Josh Hall	October 13	Toronto Raptors	Oklahoma City Thunder (Waived on September 12; previously on a two-way contract)	
Scotty Hopson	October 13	Oklahoma City Thunder	Melbourne United (Australia)	
Jalen Lecque	October 13	Milwaukee Bucks	Indiana Pacers (Waived on March 25)	
Frank Mason III	October 13	Los Angeles Lakers	Delaware Blue Coats (NBA G League)	
John Petty Jr.	October 13	New Orleans Pelicans	Alabama (Undrafted in 2021)	
Devontae Shuler	October 13	Washington Wizards	Ole Miss (Undrafted in 2021)	
LiAngelo Ball	October 14	Charlotte Hornets	Detroit Pistons (Waived on December 13, 2020)	
Armoni Brooks	October 14	Houston Rockets		
Ahmad Caver	October 14	Memphis Grizzlies	Memphis Hustle (NBA G League)	
Brandon Goodwin	October 14	New York Knicks	Atlanta Hawks	
Matthew Hurt	October 14	Memphis Grizzlies	Houston Rockets (Waived on September 24; previously on a two-way contract)	
Nino Johnson	October 14	Utah Jazz	Hamilton Honey Badgers (Canada)	
Zavier Simpson	October 14	Oklahoma City Thunder	Oklahoma City Blue (NBA G League)	
Justin Anderson	October 15	Indiana Pacers	Philadelphia 76ers (Waived on December 19, 2020)	
Troy Baxter Jr.	October 15	Chicago Bulls	Morgan State (Undrafted in 2021)	
Bennie Boatwright	October 15	Indiana Pacers	Memphis Hustle (NBA G League)	
Chris Clemons	October 15	Boston Celtics	Houston Rockets (Waived on January 21)	
Derek Culver	October 15	Indiana Pacers	West Virginia (Undrafted in 2021)	
Nate Darling	October 15	Los Angeles Clippers	Charlotte Hornets (Previously on a two-way contract)	
Vincent Edwards	October 15	Minnesota Timberwolves	Oklahoma City Blue (NBA G League)	
Ashton Hagans	October 15	Toronto Raptors	Minnesota Timberwolves (Waived on February 13; previously on a two-way contract)	
Justin Jackson	October 15	Dallas Mavericks	Milwaukee Bucks (Previously on a two-way contract)	
Justin Jaworski	October 15	Oklahoma City Thunder	Lafayette (Undrafted in 2021)	
B. J. Johnson	October 15	Orlando Magic	Brisbane Bullets (Australia)	
Brandon Knight	October 15	New York Knicks	Detroit Pistons	
Luke Kornet	October 15	Boston Celtics		
EJ Onu	October 15	Dallas Mavericks (Waived on September 3)		
Olivier Sarr	October 15	Oklahoma City Thunder	Kentucky (Undrafted in 2021)	
Nik Stauskas	October 15	Denver Nuggets	Raptors 905 (NBA G League)	
David Stockton	October 15	Memphis Grizzlies	Mets de Guaynabo (Puerto Rico)	
Axel Toupane	October 15	Golden State Warriors	Milwaukee Bucks (Previously on a two-way contract)	
Breein Tyree	October 15	Toronto Raptors	Raptors 905 (NBA G League)	
Christian Vital	October 15	Houston Rockets	Memphis Hustle (NBA G League)	
Wenyen Gabriel	October 16	Milwaukee Bucks	New Orleans Pelicans (Waived on October 12)	
Mfiondu Kabengele	October 17	Houston Rockets	Cleveland Cavaliers (Waived on October 12)	
Avery Bradley	October 18	Los Angeles Lakers (Claimed off waivers)	Golden State Warriors (Waived on October 15)	
Devontae Cacok	October 18	San Antonio Spurs (Claimed off waivers)	Brooklyn Nets (Waived on October 16)	
Jeff Dowtin	October 18	Golden State Warriors (Claimed off waivers)	Orlando Magic (Waived on October 16)	
Garrison Mathews	October 18	Houston Rockets (Claimed off waivers)	Boston Celtics (Waived on October 16)	
Jabari Parker	October 19	Boston Celtics (Waived on October 17)		
Gary Payton II	October 19	Golden State Warriors (Waived on October 15)		
DeMarcus Cousins	November 30	Milwaukee Bucks	Los Angeles Clippers	
Gary Clark	December 3	New Orleans Pelicans	Capitanes de la Ciudad de México (NBA G League)	
Wesley Matthews	December 3	Milwaukee Bucks	Los Angeles Lakers	
Davon Reed	December 4	Denver Nuggets	Grand Rapids Gold (NBA G League)	
Stanley Johnson	December 8	Chicago Bulls	South Bay Lakers (NBA G League)	
Alfonzo McKinnie	December 10	Chicago Bulls	Capitanes de la Ciudad de México (NBA G League)	
Langston Galloway	December 16	Brooklyn Nets	College Park Skyhawks (NBA G League)	
Aleem Ford	December 17	Orlando Magic	Lakeland Magic (NBA G League)	
Hassani Gravett	December 17	Orlando Magic	Lakeland Magic (NBA G League)	
B. J. Johnson	December 17	Orlando Magic	Lakeland Magic (NBA G League)	
Justin Robinson	December 17	Sacramento Kings	Milwaukee Bucks (Waived on November 29; previously on a two-way contract)	
Admiral Schofield	December 17	Orlando Magic	Lakeland Magic (NBA G League)	
Isaiah Thomas	December 17	Los Angeles Lakers	Grand Rapids Gold (NBA G League)	
James Ennis III	December 18	Brooklyn Nets	Orlando Magic	
Tyler Hall	December 18	New York Knicks	Westchester Knicks (NBA G League)	
Shaquille Harrison	December 18	Brooklyn Nets	Delaware Blue Coats (NBA G League)	
Justin Jackson	December 18	Boston Celtics	Texas Legends (NBA G League)	
Garrison Mathews	December 18	Houston Rockets (Previously on a two-way contract)		
Davon Reed	December 19	Denver Nuggets (Second 10-day contract)	Grand Rapids Gold (NBA G League)	
Alfonzo McKinnie	December 20	Chicago Bulls (Second 10-day contract)		
C. J. Miles	December 20	Boston Celtics	NBA G League Ignite (NBA G League)	
Theo Pinson	December 20	Dallas Mavericks	Maine Celtics (NBA G League)	
Justin Anderson	December 21	Cleveland Cavaliers	Fort Wayne Mad Ants (NBA G League)	
Marquese Chriss	December 21	Dallas Mavericks	Portland Trail Blazers (Waived on October 16)	
Damyean Dotson	December 21	New York Knicks	Austin Spurs (NBA G League)	
Tim Frazier	December 21	Orlando Magic	Memphis Grizzlies	
Wenyen Gabriel	December 21	Brooklyn Nets	Wisconsin Herd (NBA G League)	
Freddie Gillespie	December 21	Orlando Magic	Memphis Hustle (NBA G League)	
Jemerrio Jones	December 21	Los Angeles Lakers	Wisconsin Herd (NBA G League)	
Luke Kornet	December 21	Cleveland Cavaliers	Maine Celtics (NBA G League)	
Matt Mooney	December 21	New York Knicks	Capitanes de la Ciudad de México (NBA G League)	
Chris Silva	December 21	Minnesota Timberwolves	Iowa Wolves (NBA G League)	
Rayjon Tucker	December 21	Minnesota Timberwolves	Wisconsin Herd (NBA G League)	
Moses Wright	December 21	Los Angeles Clippers	Agua Caliente Clippers (NBA G League)	
Zylan Cheatham	December 22	Miami Heat	Birmingham Squadron (NBA G League)	
Malcolm Hill	December 22	Atlanta Hawks	Birmingham Squadron (NBA G League)	
Ersan İlyasova	December 22	Chicago Bulls	Utah Jazz	
Joe Johnson	December 22	Boston Celtics	Triplets (Big3)	
Tyler Johnson	December 22	Philadelphia 76ers	Brooklyn Nets	
George King	December 22	Dallas Mavericks	Agua Caliente Clippers (NBA G League)	
Mac McClung	December 22	Chicago Bulls	South Bay Lakers (NBA G League)	
Juwan Morgan	December 22	Toronto Raptors	Maine Celtics (NBA G League)	
Emmanuel Mudiay	December 22	Sacramento Kings	Žalgiris Kaunas (Lithuania)	
Ade Murkey	December 22	Sacramento Kings	Stockton Kings (NBA G League)	
Jordan Schakel	December 22	Washington Wizards	Capital City Go-Go (NBA G League)	
Trevon Scott	December 22	Cleveland Cavaliers	Cleveland Charge (NBA G League)	
Lance Stephenson	December 22	Atlanta Hawks	Grand Rapids Gold (NBA G League)	
Tremont Waters	December 22	Toronto Raptors	Wisconsin Herd (NBA G League)	
D. J. Wilson	December 22	Toronto Raptors	Oklahoma City Blue (NBA G League)	
Charlie Brown Jr.	December 23	Dallas Mavericks	Delaware Blue Coats (NBA G League)	
Javin DeLaurier	December 23	Milwaukee Bucks	Wisconsin Herd (NBA G League)	
Cheick Diallo	December 23	Detroit Pistons	Motor City Cruise (NBA G League)	
Danuel House	December 23	New York Knicks	Houston Rockets (Waived on December 18)	
Wes Iwundu	December 23	Atlanta Hawks	Charlotte Hornets (Waived on October 18)	
Carlik Jones	December 23	Dallas Mavericks	Texas Legends (NBA G League)	
Brandon Knight	December 23	Dallas Mavericks	Sioux Falls Skyforce (NBA G League)	
Quinndary Weatherspoon	December 23	Golden State Warriors	Santa Cruz Warriors (NBA G League)	
Darren Collison	December 24	Los Angeles Lakers	Indiana Pacers (Came out of retirement)	
Stanley Johnson	December 24	Los Angeles Lakers	Chicago Bulls (10-day contract expired on December 19)	
Daniel Oturu	December 24	Toronto Raptors	Windy City Bulls (NBA G League)	
Al-Farouq Aminu	December 25	Boston Celtics	San Antonio Spurs (Waived on October 18)	
Anthony Barber	December 25	Atlanta Hawks	College Park Skyhawks (NBA G League)	
Shaq Buchanan	December 25	Memphis Grizzlies	Memphis Hustle (NBA G League)	
Malik Ellison	December 25	Atlanta Hawks	College Park Skyhawks (NBA G League)	
Xavier Moon	December 25	Los Angeles Clippers	Agua Caliente Clippers (NBA G League)	
Norvel Pelle	December 25	Boston Celtics	Cleveland Charge (NBA G League)	
Cassius Stanley	December 25	Detroit Pistons	Motor City Cruise (NBA G League)	
Tyrell Terry	December 25	Memphis Grizzlies	Dallas Mavericks (Waived on October 15)	
Derrick Walton	December 25	Detroit Pistons	Motor City Cruise (NBA G League)	
Jarron Cumberland	December 26	Portland Trail Blazers	Delaware Blue Coats (NBA G League)	
Justin James	December 26	New Orleans Pelicans	Cleveland Charge (NBA G League)	
Cameron McGriff	December 26	Portland Trail Blazers	Greensboro Swarm (NBA G League)	
Alfonzo McKinnie	December 26	Chicago Bulls (Signed for rest of season)		
Deividas Sirvydis	December 26	Detroit Pistons	Motor City Cruise (NBA G League)	
Anthony Tolliver	December 26	New Orleans Pelicans	Philadelphia 76ers (Waived on August 27)	
Brandon Williams	December 26	Portland Trail Blazers	Westchester Knicks (NBA G League)	
Chaundee Brown	December 27	Atlanta Hawks	Los Angeles Lakers (Waived on December 21; previously on a two-way contract)	
Rob Edwards	December 27	Oklahoma City Thunder	Oklahoma City Blue (NBA G League)	
Langston Galloway	December 27	Brooklyn Nets (Second 10-day contract; last 10-day contract ended December 25)		
Jordan Goodwin	December 27	Washington Wizards	Capital City Go-Go (NBA G League)	
Hassani Gravett	December 27	Orlando Magic (Second 10-day contract)		
Scotty Hopson	December 27	Oklahoma City Thunder	Oklahoma City Blue (NBA G League)	
Greg Monroe	December 27	Minnesota Timberwolves	Capital City Go-Go (NBA G League)	
Olivier Sarr	December 27	Oklahoma City Thunder	Oklahoma City Blue (NBA G League)	
Admiral Schofield	December 27	Orlando Magic (Second 10-day contract)		
Xavier Sneed	December 27	Memphis Grizzlies	Greensboro Swarm (NBA G League)	
Keifer Sykes	December 27	Indiana Pacers (Signed for rest of season)	Fort Wayne Mad Ants (NBA G League)	
Emanuel Terry	December 27	Phoenix Suns	Stockton Kings (NBA G League)	
Feron Hunt	December 28	New Orleans Pelicans	Texas Legends (NBA G League)	
DeJon Jarreau	December 28	Houston Rockets	Texas Legends (NBA G League)	
Alize Johnson	December 28	Washington Wizards	Chicago Bulls (Waived on December 26)	
Trayvon Palmer	December 28	Detroit Pistons	Motor City Cruise (NBA G League)	
Reggie Perry	December 28	Portland Trail Blazers	Raptors 905 (NBA G League)	
Justin Robinson	December 28	Detroit Pistons	Sacramento Kings (Last 10-day contract ended December 26)	
Craig Sword	December 28	Washington Wizards	Capital City Go-Go (NBA G League)	
Justin Tillman	December 28	Atlanta Hawks	College Park Skyhawks (NBA G League)	
Chris Clemons	December 29	Atlanta Hawks	Maine Celtics (NBA G League)	
James Ennis III	December 29	Los Angeles Clippers	Brooklyn Nets (10-day contract ended December 27)	
Shaquille Harrison	December 29	Brooklyn Nets (Last 10-day contract ended December 28)		
Jaylen Hoard	December 29	Oklahoma City Thunder	Oklahoma City Blue (NBA G League)	
Malik Newman	December 29	Cleveland Cavaliers	Cleveland Charge (NBA G League)	
Cameron Oliver	December 29	Atlanta Hawks	South Bay Lakers (NBA G League)	
Micah Potter	December 29	Detroit Pistons	Sioux Falls Skyforce (NBA G League)	
Isaiah Thomas	December 29	Dallas Mavericks	Los Angeles Lakers (10-day contract ended December 26)	
Brad Wanamaker	December 29	Washington Wizards	Indiana Pacers (Waived on December 27)	
Jordan Bell	December 30	Chicago Bulls	Santa Cruz Warriors (NBA G League)	
Jaime Echenique	December 30	Washington Wizards	Capital City Go-Go (NBA G League)	
Kyle Guy	December 30	Miami Heat	Cleveland Charge (NBA G League)	
Haywood Highsmith	December 30	Miami Heat	Delaware Blue Coats (NBA G League)	
Nate Hinton	December 30	Indiana Pacers	Fort Wayne Mad Ants (NBA G League)	
Aric Holman	December 30	Miami Heat	Austin Spurs (NBA G League)	
Dakota Mathias	December 30	Memphis Grizzlies	Philadelphia 76ers (Waived on January 18; previously on a two-way contract)	
Davon Reed	December 30	Denver Nuggets (Third 10-day contract)		
M. J. Walker	December 30	Phoenix Suns	Westchester Knicks (NBA G League)	
Paris Bass	December 31	Phoenix Suns	South Bay Lakers (NBA G League)	
Ahmad Caver	December 31	Indiana Pacers	Memphis Hustle (NBA G League)	
Mario Chalmers	December 31	Miami Heat	Grand Rapids Gold (NBA G League)	
Marquese Chriss	December 31	Dallas Mavericks (Second 10-day contract)		
Damyean Dotson	December 31	New York Knicks (Second 10-day contract)		
Tim Frazier	December 31	Orlando Magic (Second 10-day contract)		
Wenyen Gabriel	December 31	Los Angeles Clippers	Brooklyn Nets (Last 10-day contract ended December 30)	
Freddie Gillespie	December 31	Orlando Magic (Second 10-day contract)		
Brandon Goodwin	December 31	Cleveland Cavaliers	Westchester Knicks (NBA G League)	
Matt Mooney	December 31	New York Knicks (Second 10-day contract)		
Jaysean Paige	December 31	Detroit Pistons	Maine Celtics (NBA G League)	
Theo Pinson	December 31	Dallas Mavericks (Second 10-day contract)		
Chris Silva	December 31	Miami Heat	Minnesota Timberwolves (Last 10-day contract ended December 30)	
Nik Stauskas	December 31	Miami Heat	Grand Rapids Gold (NBA G League)	
Rayjon Tucker	December 31	Denver Nuggets	Minnesota Timberwolves (10-day contract ended December 30)	
Justin Anderson	January 1	Indiana Pacers	Cleveland Cavaliers (10-day contract ended January 1)	
Bismack Biyombo	January 1	Phoenix Suns	Charlotte Hornets	
DaQuan Jeffries	January 1	Memphis Grizzlies	College Park Skyhawks (NBA G League)	
Carlik Jones	January 1	Denver Nuggets	Dallas Mavericks (10-day contract ended December 31)	
Mac McClung	January 1	Chicago Bulls (Second 10-day contract)		
Jaylen Morris	January 1	San Antonio Spurs	Austin Spurs (NBA G League)	
Lance Stephenson	January 1	Indiana Pacers	Atlanta Hawks (10-day contract ended January 1)	
Killian Tillie	January 1	Memphis Grizzlies (Previously on a two-way contract)		
Tremont Waters	January 1	Washington Wizards	Toronto Raptors (10-day contract ended December 31)	
Charlie Brown Jr.	January 3	Philadelphia 76ers	Delaware Blue Coats (NBA G League)	
Luke Kornet	January 3	Milwaukee Bucks	Cleveland Cavaliers (10-day contract ended December 30)	
Jon Teske	January 3	Memphis Grizzlies	Lakeland Magic (NBA G League)	
Justin Jackson	January 4	Phoenix Suns	Texas Legends (NBA G League)	
Xavier Moon	January 4	Los Angeles Clippers (Second 10-day contract)		
Braxton Key	January 5	Philadelphia 76ers	Delaware Blue Coats (NBA G League)	
Ryan Arcidiacono	January 6	New York Knicks	Maine Celtics (NBA G League)	
Danuel House	January 6	Utah Jazz	New York Knicks (Last 10-day contract ended January 1)	
Stanley Johnson	January 6	Los Angeles Lakers (Second 10-day contract; last 10-day contract ended January 3)		
Tyler Johnson	January 6	San Antonio Spurs	Philadelphia 76ers (Last 10-day contract ended December 31)	
Anthony Lamb	January 6	San Antonio Spurs	Rio Grande Valley Vipers (NBA G League)	
Greg Monroe	January 6	Washington Wizards	Minnesota Timberwolves (Last 10-day contract ended January 5)	
Jeff Dowtin	January 7	Milwaukee Bucks	Golden State Warriors (Waived on January 2; previously on a two-way contract)	
Langston Galloway	January 7	Milwaukee Bucks	Brooklyn Nets (Last 10-day contract ended January 5)	
Norvel Pelle	January 7	Utah Jazz	Boston Celtics (Last 10-day contract ended January 3)	
D. J. Wilson	January 7	Toronto Raptors (Second 10-day contract; last 10-day contract ended December 31)		
Cassius Stanley	January 8	Detroit Pistons (Second 10-day contract)	Motor City Cruise (NBA G League)	
Olivier Sarr	January 9	Oklahoma City Thunder (Second 10-day contract)	Oklahoma City Blue (NBA G League)	
Marquese Chriss	January 10	Dallas Mavericks (Third 10-day contract)		
James Ennis III	January 10	Denver Nuggets	Los Angeles Clippers (Last 10-day contract ended January 7)	
Kyle Guy	January 10	Miami Heat (Second 10-day contract; last 10-day contract ended January 8)		
Chris Silva	January 10	Miami Heat (Second 10-day contract; last 10-day contract ended January 9)		
Denzel Valentine	January 10	Utah Jazz	New York Knicks (Waived on January 4)	
Bismack Biyombo	January 11	Phoenix Suns (Signed for rest of season)		
Mamadi Diakite	January 11	Oklahoma City Thunder (10-day contract; previously waived on October 16)		
Wenyen Gabriel	January 11	Los Angeles Clippers (Second 10-day contract)		
Lance Stephenson	January 11	Indiana Pacers (Second 10-day contract)		
Paris Bass	January 12	Phoenix Suns (Second 10-day contract; last 10-day contract ended January 9)		
Zylan Cheatham	January 12	Utah Jazz	Birmingham Squadron (NBA G League)	
Malcolm Hill	January 14	Chicago Bulls	Atlanta Hawks (Last 10-day contract ended December 31)	
Dakota Mathias	January 14	Memphis Grizzlies (Second 10-day contract)	Texas Legends (NBA G League)	
Xavier Moon	January 14	Los Angeles Clippers (Third 10-day contract)		
Lance Stephenson	January 14	Indiana Pacers (Third 10-day contract)		
Marquese Chriss	January 15	Dallas Mavericks (Signed to multi-year contract)		
Stanley Johnson	January 17	Los Angeles Lakers (Third 10-day contract; last 10-day contract ended January 16)		
Danuel House	January 18	Utah Jazz (Second 10-day contract; last 10-day contract ended January 16)		
Ryan Arcidiacono	January 19	New York Knicks (Second 10-day contract; previously waived on January 13)		
Shaquille Harrison	January 19	Memphis Grizzlies	Delaware Blue Coats (NBA G League)	
DeMarcus Cousins	January 21	Denver Nuggets	Milwaukee Bucks (Waived on January 6)	
Mamadi Diakite	January 21	Oklahoma City Thunder (Second 10-day contract)		
Chris Silva	January 21	Miami Heat (Third 10-day contract)		
Cassius Stanley	January 21	Detroit Pistons (Third 10-day contract)	Motor City Cruise (NBA G League)	
Lance Stephenson	January 24	Indiana Pacers (Fourth 10-day contract)		
Stanley Johnson	January 27	Los Angeles Lakers (Signed to multi-year contract)		
DeMarcus Cousins	January 28	Denver Nuggets (Second 10-day contract; previously waived on January 28)		
Wenyen Gabriel	January 28	New Orleans Pelicans	Wisconsin Herd (NBA G League)	
Danuel House	January 28	Utah Jazz (Third 10-day contract)		
Mamadi Diakite	January 31	Oklahoma City Thunder (Third 10-day contract)		
Chris Silva	January 31	Miami Heat (Fourth 10-day contract)		
Justin Jackson	February 1	Phoenix Suns (Second 10-day contract)	Texas Legends (NBA G League)	
Lance Stephenson	February 3	Indiana Pacers (Signed for rest of season)		
Zylan Cheatham	February 4	New Orleans Pelicans	Birmingham Squadron (NBA G League)	
Miye Oni	February 4	New Orleans Pelicans	Oklahoma City Thunder (Waived on January 7)	
Reggie Perry	February 4	Indiana Pacers	Raptors 905 (NBA G League)	
Greg Monroe	February 5	Milwaukee Bucks	Capital City Go-Go (NBA G League)	
DeMarcus Cousins	February 10	Denver Nuggets (Third 10-day contract)		
Sam Hauser	February 11	Boston Celtics (Previously on a two-way contract)		
Danuel House	February 11	Utah Jazz (Signed for rest of season)		
Luke Kornet	February 11	Boston Celtics (Signed for rest of season)	Maine Celtics (NBA G League)	
Aaron Wiggins	February 12	Oklahoma City Thunder (Previously on a two-way contract)		
Ryan Arcidiacono	February 13	New York Knicks (Signed for rest of season)	Maine Celtics (NBA G League)	
Daishen Nix	February 14	Houston Rockets (Previously on a two-way contract)		
Haywood Highsmith	February 15	Miami Heat (Second 10-day contract)	Delaware Blue Coats (NBA G League)	
Caleb Martin	February 15	Miami Heat (Previously on a two-way contract)		
DeAndre' Bembry	February 16	Milwaukee Bucks (Signed for rest of season)	Brooklyn Nets (Waived on February 10)	
Tristan Thompson	February 19	Chicago Bulls (Signed for rest of season)	Indiana Pacers (Waived on February 17)	
Trendon Watford	February 21	Portland Trail Blazers (Previously on a two-way contract)		
Goran Dragić	February 22	Brooklyn Nets (Signed for rest of season)	San Antonio Spurs (Waived on February 15)	
Drew Eubanks	February 22	Portland Trail Blazers	Toronto Raptors (Waived on February 10)	
Malik Fitts	February 23	Boston Celtics	Utah Jazz (Waived on January 13)	
Kelan Martin	February 23	Boston Celtics	Indiana Pacers (Waived on January 6)	
Jevon Carter	February 24	Milwaukee Bucks (Signed for rest of season)	Brooklyn Nets (Waived on February 22)	
Willie Cauley-Stein	February 24	Philadelphia 76ers	Dallas Mavericks (Waived on January 15)	
DeMarcus Cousins	February 25	Denver Nuggets (Signed for rest of season)		
Tim Frazier	February 26	Cleveland Cavaliers	Orlando Magic (Last 10-day contract ended January 9)	
Haywood Highsmith	February 26	Miami Heat (Third 10-day contract)		
Tomáš Satoranský	February 28	Washington Wizards (Signed for rest of season)	San Antonio Spurs (Waived on February 26)	
D. J. Wilson	February 28	Toronto Raptors (Third 10-day contract)	Oklahoma City Blue (NBA G League)	
D. J. Augustin	March 1	Los Angeles Lakers (Signed for rest of season)	Houston Rockets (Waived on February 10)	
Alize Johnson	March 2	New Orleans Pelicans	Washington Wizards (Last 10-day contract ended January 6)	
Isaiah Thomas	March 2	Charlotte Hornets	Grand Rapids Gold (NBA G League)	
DeAndre Jordan	March 3	Philadelphia 76ers (Signed for rest of season)	Los Angeles Lakers (Waived on March 1)	
Devontae Cacok	March 4	San Antonio Spurs (Previously on a two-way contract)		
Drew Eubanks	March 4	Portland Trail Blazers (Second 10-day contract)		
Nik Stauskas	March 4	Boston Celtics (Signed to multi-year contract)	Grand Rapids Gold (NBA G League)	
Joe Wieskamp	March 4	San Antonio Spurs (Previously on a two-way contract)		
Malik Fitts	March 5	Boston Celtics (Second 10-day contract)		
Kelan Martin	March 5	Boston Celtics (Second 10-day contract)		
Armoni Brooks	March 6	Toronto Raptors	College Park Skyhawks (NBA G League)	
Haywood Highsmith	March 8	Miami Heat (Signed to multi-year contract)		
Moses Brown	March 10	Cleveland Cavaliers	Dallas Mavericks (Waived on February 10)	
Tyrone Wallace	March 11	New Orleans Pelicans	Long Island Nets (NBA G League)	
Alize Johnson	March 12	New Orleans Pelicans (Second 10-day contract; previously waived on March 11)		
Isaiah Thomas	March 12	Charlotte Hornets (Second 10-day contract)		
Kris Dunn	March 14	Portland Trail Blazers	Agua Caliente Clippers (NBA G League)	
Drew Eubanks	March 14	Portland Trail Blazers (Third 10-day contract)		
Malik Fitts	March 15	Boston Celtics (Signed for rest of season)		
Armoni Brooks	March 16	Toronto Raptors (Second 10-day contract)		
Justin Anderson	March 17	Indiana Pacers (Second 10-day contract)	Fort Wayne Mad Ants (NBA G League)	
Moses Brown	March 21	Cleveland Cavaliers (Second 10-day contract)		
Tyrone Wallace	March 21	New Orleans Pelicans (Second 10-day contract)		
Jeff Dowtin	March 22	Orlando Magic	Lakeland Magic (NBA G League)	
Isaiah Thomas	March 22	Charlotte Hornets (Signed for rest of season)		
Kris Dunn	March 24	Portland Trail Blazers (Second 10-day contract)		
Drew Eubanks	March 24	Portland Trail Blazers (Fourth 10-day contract)		
Braxton Key	March 24	Detroit Pistons	Delaware Blue Coats (NBA G League)	
Armoni Brooks	March 26	Toronto Raptors (Signed to multi-year contract)		
Amir Coffey	March 26	Los Angeles Clippers (Previously on a two-way contract)		
Jose Alvarado	March 28	New Orleans Pelicans (Signed to multi-year contract; previously on a two-way contract)		
Justin Anderson	March 28	Indiana Pacers (Third 10-day contract)		
Greg Monroe	March 28	Utah Jazz	Capital City Go-Go (NBA G League)	
Juwan Morgan	March 28	Boston Celtics	Maine Celtics (NBA G League)	
Brandon Knight	March 29	Dallas Mavericks (Second 10-day contract)	Sioux Falls Skyforce (NBA G League)	
Reggie Perry	March 30	Portland Trail Blazers (Second 10-day contract)	Raptors 905 (NBA G League)	
Devin Cannady	March 31	Orlando Magic	Lakeland Magic (NBA G League)	
RJ Nembhard	March 31	Cleveland Cavaliers (Previously on a two-way contract)		
Jaylen Hoard	April 1	Oklahoma City Thunder (Signed for rest of season)	Oklahoma City Blue (NBA G League)	
Kris Dunn	April 3	Portland Trail Blazers (Signed for rest of season)		
Carsen Edwards	April 3	Detroit Pistons (Signed to multi-year contract)	Salt Lake City Stars (NBA G League)	
Drew Eubanks	April 3	Portland Trail Blazers (Signed for rest of season)		
Georgios Kalaitzakis	April 4	Oklahoma City Thunder (Signed for rest of season)	Oklahoma City Blue (NBA G League)	
Zavier Simpson	April 4	Oklahoma City Thunder (Signed for rest of season)	Oklahoma City Blue (NBA G League)	
Luca Vildoza	April 6	Milwaukee Bucks (Signed to multi-year contract)	New York Knicks (Waived on October 3)	
Skylar Mays	April 7	Atlanta Hawks (Previously on a two-way contract)		
Greg Monroe	April 7	Minnesota Timberwolves (Signed for rest of season)	Utah Jazz (10-day contract expired on April 6)	
Terry Taylor	April 7	Indiana Pacers (Signed to multi-year contract; previously on a two-way contract)		
Duane Washington Jr.	April 7	Indiana Pacers (Signed to multi-year contract; previously on a two-way contract)		
Wenyen Gabriel	April 8	Los Angeles Lakers (Previously on a two-way contract)		
Rayjon Tucker	April 8	Milwaukee Bucks (Signed to multi-year contract)	Wisconsin Herd (NBA G League)	
Moses Brown	April 9	Cleveland Cavaliers (Previously on a two-way contract)		
Juwan Morgan	April 9	Boston Celtics (Signed to multi-year contract; 10-day contract expired on April 6)		
Reggie Perry	April 9	Portland Trail Blazers (Signed for rest of season)		
Devin Cannady	April 10	Orlando Magic (Signed for rest of season)		
Kessler Edwards	April 10	Brooklyn Nets (Previously on a two-way contract)		
Trent Forrest	April 10	Utah Jazz (Previously on a two-way contract)		
Ish Wainright	April 10	Phoenix Suns (Previously on a two-way contract)		
Al-Farouq Aminu			Boston Celtics (10-day contract expired on January 3)	
Justin Anderson			Indiana Pacers (10-day contract expired on April 6)	
Trevor Ariza			Los Angeles Lakers (Waived on April 7)	
Aron Baynes			Toronto Raptors (Waived on August 4)	
DeAndre' Bembry			Milwaukee Bucks (Waived on April 7)	
Michael Carter-Williams			Orlando Magic (Waived on February 10)	
Willie Cauley-Stein			Philadelphia 76ers (Waived on March 3)	
Mamadi Diakite			Oklahoma City Thunder (Waived on February 9)	
Sekou Doumbouya			Los Angeles Lakers (Waived on March 1; previously on a two-way contract)	
PJ Dozier			Orlando Magic (Waived on February 10)	
Tim Frazier			Cleveland Cavaliers (10-day contract expired on March 6)	
Marcus Garrett			Miami Heat (Waived on January 16; previously on a two-way contract)	
Solomon Hill			New York Knicks (Waived on January 19)	
Ersan İlyasova			Chicago Bulls (10-day contract expired on December 31)	
Alize Johnson			New Orleans Pelicans (10-day contract expired on March 21)	
James Johnson			Brooklyn Nets (Waived on April 7)	
Joe Johnson			Boston Celtics (10-day contract expired on December 31)	
Tyler Johnson			San Antonio Spurs (10-day contract expired on January 16)	
Frank Kaminsky			Phoenix Suns (Waived on April 7)	
Enes Kanter Freedom			Houston Rockets (Waived on February 14)	
Brandon Knight			Dallas Mavericks (10-day contract expired on April 8)	
Alfonzo McKinnie			Chicago Bulls (Waived on February 19)	
Sam Merrill			Memphis Grizzlies (Waived on January 2)	
E'Twaun Moore			Orlando Magic (Waived on February 10)	
Abdel Nader			Phoenix Suns (Waived on February 10)	
Semi Ojeleye			Los Angeles Clippers (Waived on March 26)	
KZ Okpala			Oklahoma City Thunder (Waived on February 11)	
Eugene Omoruyi			Dallas Mavericks (Waived on December 26; previously on a two-way contract)	
Miye Oni			New Orleans Pelicans (10-day contract expired on February 13)	
Jabari Parker			Boston Celtics (Waived on January 7)	
Patrick Patterson			Portland Trail Blazers (Waived on October 16)	
Jontay Porter			Memphis Grizzlies (Waived on July 31)	
Grant Riller			Philadelphia 76ers (Waived on December 19; previously on a two-way contract)	
Justin Robinson			Detroit Pistons (10-day contract expired on January 6)	
Luka Šamanić			New York Knicks (Waived on March 17; previously on a two-way contract)	
Olivier Sarr			Oklahoma City Thunder (Waived on April 6; previously on a two-way contract)	
Mike Scott			Philadelphia 76ers	
Chris Smith			Detroit Pistons (Waived on April 3; previously on a two-way contract)	
Dennis Smith Jr.			Portland Trail Blazers (Waived on February 21)	
Edmond Sumner			Brooklyn Nets (Waived on October 10)	
Keifer Sykes			Indiana Pacers (Waived on April 7)	
Anthony Tolliver			New Orleans Pelicans (Contract voided on December 27)	
Brad Wanamaker			Washington Wizards (10-day contract expired on January 8)	
Paul Watson			Oklahoma City Thunder (Waived on February 10; previously on a two-way contract)	
Cody Zeller			Portland Trail Blazers (Waived on February 8)	

* Player option
** Team option
*** Early termination option

=== Two-way contracts ===
Per recent NBA rules implemented as of the 2017–18 season, teams are permitted to have two two-way players on their roster at any given time, in addition to their 15-man regular season roster. A two-way player will provide services primarily to the team's G League affiliate, but can spend up to 45 days with the parent NBA team. Only players with four or fewer years of NBA experience are able to sign two-way contracts, which can be for either one season or two. Players entering training camp for a team have a chance to convert their training camp deal into a two-way contract if they prove themselves worthy enough for it. Teams also have the option to convert a two-way contract into a regular, minimum-salary NBA contract, at which point the player becomes a regular member of the parent NBA team. Two-way players are not eligible for NBA playoff rosters, so a team must convert any two-way players it wants to use in the playoffs, waiving another player in the process.

During the 2021–22 season, two-way deals will work a little differently than usual. Rather than being limited to spending 45 days with their NBA teams, two-way players would be eligible to be active for up to 50 of their team's 82 NBA games. And instead of having their salaries by how many days they spend in the NBA, they'll be paid a flat salary equal to 50% of the minimum player salary applicable to a player with zero years of service.

	Denotes players who were promoted to the main roster
****	Denotes players who were cut before season's end

Player	Date signed	Team	School / Club team	Ref
Joël Ayayi****	August 3	Los Angeles Lakers	Gonzaga (Undrafted in 2021)	
Nate Hinton**** (RFA)	August 3	Dallas Mavericks (Previously on a two-way contract)		
Arnoldas Kulboka	August 3	Charlotte Hornets	RETAbet Bilbao Basket (Spain)	
Scottie Lewis	August 3	Charlotte Hornets	Florida	
Sandro Mamukelashvili	August 3	Milwaukee Bucks	Seton Hall	
Austin Reaves	August 3	Los Angeles Lakers	Oklahoma (Undrafted in 2021)	
Rayjon Tucker**** (RFA)	August 3	Philadelphia 76ers (Previously on a two-way contract)		
Trendon Watford	August 3	Portland Trail Blazers	LSU (Undrafted in 2021)	
Sharife Cooper	August 4	Atlanta Hawks	Auburn	
Nathan Knight	August 4	Minnesota Timberwolves	Atlanta Hawks (Previously on a two-way contract)	
Duane Washington Jr.	August 5	Indiana Pacers	Ohio State (Undrafted in 2021)	
McKinley Wright IV	August 5	Minnesota Timberwolves	Colorado (Undrafted in 2021)	
Justin Champagnie	August 7	Toronto Raptors	Pittsburgh (Undrafted in 2021)	
Aaron Henry****	August 8	Philadelphia 76ers	Michigan State (Undrafted in 2021)	
David Johnson	August 8	Toronto Raptors	Louisville	
Neemias Queta	August 8	Sacramento Kings	Utah State	
Jericho Sims	August 8	New York Knicks	Texas	
Trent Forrest (RFA)	August 10	Utah Jazz (Previously on a two-way contract)		
Ignas Brazdeikis	August 11	Orlando Magic		
Killian Tillie (RFA)	August 11	Memphis Grizzlies (Previously on a two-way contract)		
Chris Chiozza	August 13	Golden State Warriors	Brooklyn Nets (Previously on a two-way contract)	
Devon Dotson**** (RFA)	August 13	Chicago Bulls (Previously on a two-way contract)		
Sam Hauser	August 13	Boston Celtics	Virginia (Undrafted in 2021)	
Markus Howard (RFA)	August 13	Denver Nuggets (Previously on a two-way contract)		
Matthew Hurt****	August 13	Houston Rockets	Duke (Undrafted in 2021)	
Eugene Omoruyi****	August 13	Dallas Mavericks	Oregon (Undrafted in 2021)	
Aaron Wiggins	August 14	Oklahoma City Thunder	Maryland	
Kessler Edwards	August 16	Brooklyn Nets	Pepperdine	
Luka Garza	August 16	Detroit Pistons	Iowa	
Chris Smith****	August 16	Detroit Pistons	UCLA (Undrafted in 2021)	
Josh Hall**** (RFA)	August 17	Oklahoma City Thunder (Previously on a two-way contract)		
Jose Alvarado	August 18	New Orleans Pelicans	Georgia Tech (Undrafted in 2021)	
Daulton Hommes****	August 18	New Orleans Pelicans	Vanoli Cremona (Italy)	
Cassius Winston (RFA)	August 19	Washington Wizards (Previously on a two-way contract)		
DeJon Jarreau****	August 24	Indiana Pacers	Houston (Undrafted in 2021)	
Skylar Mays (RFA)	August 26	Atlanta Hawks (Previously on a two-way contract)		
Grant Riller****	August 30	Philadelphia 76ers	Charlotte Hornets (Previously on a two-way contract)	
Marcus Garrett****	September 2	Miami Heat	Kansas (Undrafted in 2021)	
JaQuori McLaughlin****	September 3	Dallas Mavericks	UC Santa Barbara (Undrafted in 2021)	
Anthony Lamb**** (RFA)	September 4	Houston Rockets (Previously on a two-way contract)		
Chandler Hutchison****	September 7	Phoenix Suns	San Antonio Spurs (Waived on September 4)	
Joe Wieskamp	September 7	San Antonio Spurs	Iowa	
Caleb Martin	September 14	Miami Heat	Charlotte Hornets (Waived on August 7)	
Justin Robinson****	September 14	Milwaukee Bucks	Oklahoma City Thunder (10-day contract expired on April 25)	
Brodric Thomas**** (RFA)	September 15	Cleveland Cavaliers (Previously on a two-way contract)		
Paul Watson****	September 15	Oklahoma City Thunder	Toronto Raptors (Waived on August 3)	
Petr Cornelie****	September 17	Denver Nuggets	Élan Béarnais (France)	
Justin James****	September 22	Utah Jazz	Sacramento Kings (Waived on August 15)	
Keljin Blevins	September 23	Portland Trail Blazers (Previously on a two-way contract)		
Yves Pons	September 23	Memphis Grizzlies		
Jamorko Pickett	September 24	Detroit Pistons		
Tyler Bey****	September 26	Houston Rockets (Waived on September 17)		
Amir Coffey (RFA)	September 26	Los Angeles Clippers (Previously on a two-way contract)		
Sekou Doumbouya****	October 12	Los Angeles Lakers	Houston Rockets (Waived on October 7)	
Armoni Brooks	October 13	Houston Rockets		
Daishen Nix	October 15	Houston Rockets		
Tyler Cook	October 16	Chicago Bulls		
David Duke Jr.	October 16	Brooklyn Nets		
Tacko Fall****	October 16	Cleveland Cavaliers		
Malik Fitts****	October 16	Utah Jazz		
RJ Nembhard	October 16	Cleveland Cavaliers		
Luka Šamanić****	October 16	New York Knicks	San Antonio Spurs (Waived on October 11)	
Joël Ayayi****	October 17	Washington Wizards (Claimed off waivers)	Los Angeles Lakers (Waived on October 15; previously on a two-way contract)	
Devontae Cacok	October 18	San Antonio Spurs		
Jeff Dowtin****	October 18	Golden State Warriors		
Jay Huff****	October 18	Los Angeles Lakers	Washington Wizards (Waived on October 13)	
Garrison Mathews	October 18	Houston Rockets		
Brodric Thomas	October 18	Boston Celtics	Cleveland Cavaliers (Waived on October 12; previously on a two-way contract)	
Ish Wainright	October 21	Phoenix Suns	Toronto Raptors (Waived on October 17)	
Mychal Mulder****	October 26	Orlando Magic	Golden State Warriors (Waived on October 15)	
Chaundee Brown****	November 16	Los Angeles Lakers	South Bay Lakers (NBA G League)	
Javonte Smart****	November 29	Milwaukee Bucks	Sioux Falls Skyforce (NBA G League)	
Terry Taylor	December 15	Indiana Pacers	Fort Wayne Mad Ants (NBA G League)	
Trevelin Queen	December 18	Houston Rockets	Rio Grande Valley Vipers (NBA G League)	
Myles Powell	December 19	Philadelphia 76ers	Westchester Knicks (NBA G League)	
Jared Harper****	December 21	New Orleans Pelicans	Birmingham Squadron (NBA G League)	
Mason Jones	December 21	Los Angeles Lakers	South Bay Lakers (NBA G League)	
Quinndary Weatherspoon	January 3	Golden State Warriors (Previously on a 10-day contract)		
Tyrell Terry	January 4	Memphis Grizzlies (Previously on a 10-day contract)		
Admiral Schofield	January 6	Orlando Magic (Previously on a 10-day contract)		
Gary Clark	January 9	New Orleans Pelicans (Waived on January 7)		
Brandon Goodwin	January 9	Cleveland Cavaliers (Previously on a 10-day contract)		
Davon Reed	January 9	Denver Nuggets (Previously on a 10-day contract)		
Theo Pinson	January 10	Dallas Mavericks (Previously on a 10-day contract)		
Charlie Brown Jr.	January 11	Philadelphia 76ers (Previously on a 10-day contract)		
Sekou Doumbouya****	January 12	Los Angeles Lakers (Waived on November 16; previously on a two-way contract)		
Lindell Wigginton	January 13	Milwaukee Bucks	Wisconsin Herd (NBA G League)	
Kyle Guy****	January 17	Miami Heat (Previously on a 10-day contract)		
Malcolm Hill	January 19	Chicago Bulls (Previously on a 10-day contract)		
Lindy Waters III	February 10	Oklahoma City Thunder	Oklahoma City Blue (NBA G League)	
Javonte Smart	February 15	Miami Heat	Sioux Falls Skyforce (NBA G League)	
Xavier Sneed	February 16	Utah Jazz	Greensboro Swarm (NBA G League)	
Olivier Sarr****	February 21	Oklahoma City Thunder	Oklahoma City Blue (NBA G League)	
Brandon Williams	February 22	Portland Trail Blazers	Westchester Knicks (NBA G League)	
Moses Wright	February 25	Dallas Mavericks	Agua Caliente Clippers (NBA G League)	
Matt Ryan	February 28	Boston Celtics	Grand Rapids Gold (NBA G League)	
Wenyen Gabriel	March 1	Los Angeles Lakers	Wisconsin Herd (NBA G League)	
D. J. Stewart Jr.	March 4	San Antonio Spurs	Sioux Falls Skyforce (NBA G League)	
Robert Woodard II	March 4	San Antonio Spurs	Oklahoma City Blue (NBA G League)	
Jordan Schakel	March 9	Washington Wizards	Capital City Go-Go (NBA G League)	
Gabriel Lundberg	March 11	Phoenix Suns	CSKA Moscow (Russia)	
Feron Hunt	March 18	New York Knicks	Texas Legends (NBA G League)	
Anthony Lamb	March 23	Houston Rockets	Rio Grande Valley Vipers (NBA G League)	
Mychal Mulder	March 24	Miami Heat	Sioux Falls Skyforce (NBA G League)	
Xavier Moon	March 26	Los Angeles Clippers	Agua Caliente Clippers (NBA G League)	
Jared Harper	March 28	New Orleans Pelicans	Birmingham Squadron (NBA G League)	
Moses Brown	March 31	Cleveland Cavaliers (Previously on a 10-day contract)		
Braxton Key	April 3	Detroit Pistons (Previously on a 10-day contract)		
Melvin Frazier	April 6	Oklahoma City Thunder	Iowa Wolves (NBA G League)	
Nate Hinton	April 7	Indiana Pacers	Fort Wayne Mad Ants (NBA G League)	
Gabe York	April 7	Indiana Pacers	Fort Wayne Mad Ants (NBA G League)	
Chaundee Brown	April 9	Atlanta Hawks	South Bay Lakers (NBA G League)	
Mac McClung	April 9	Los Angeles Lakers	South Bay Lakers (NBA G League)	
RJ Nembhard	April 10	Cleveland Cavaliers (Waived on April 7)		

=== Going to other North American leagues ===
The new league of all players is NBA G League, although some players have returned to their former team, as shown below. The NBA contract status of nearly all players is unrestricted free agent, and the rest is stated otherwise.

*	Denotes G-League players who returned to their former team
^{†}	Previously on a two-way contract
	Denotes players whose NBA contract status is unsigned draft pick

Player	Date signed	New team	NBA team	Ref
Ryan Arcidiacono	October 23	Maine Celtics	Boston Celtics	
LiAngelo Ball	October 23	Greensboro Swarm	Charlotte Hornets	
Mitch Ballock	October 23	Cleveland Charge	Cleveland Cavaliers	
Chaundee Brown	October 23	South Bay Lakers	Los Angeles Lakers	
Shaq Buchanan*	October 23	Memphis Hustle	Memphis Grizzlies	
Ahmad Caver*	October 23	Memphis Hustle	Memphis Grizzlies	
Chris Clemons	October 23	Maine Celtics	Boston Celtics	
Nate Darling	October 23	Agua Caliente Clippers	Los Angeles Clippers	
Freddie Gillespie*	October 23	Memphis Hustle	Toronto Raptors	
Kyle Guy	October 23	Cleveland Charge	Cleveland Cavaliers	
Feron Hunt	October 23	Texas Legends	Dallas Mavericks	
Matthew Hurt	October 23	Memphis Hustle	Memphis Grizzlies	
Justin Jackson	October 23	Texas Legends	Dallas Mavericks	
Justin James	October 23	Cleveland Charge	Cleveland Cavaliers	
Carlik Jones	October 23	Texas Legends	Dallas Mavericks	
Brandon Knight	October 23	Sioux Falls Skyforce	New York Knicks	
Luke Kornet	October 23	Maine Celtics	Boston Celtics	
Karim Mané^{†}	October 23	Memphis Hustle	Orlando Magic	
Frank Mason III	October 23	South Bay Lakers	Los Angeles Lakers	
Mac McClung	October 23	South Bay Lakers	Los Angeles Lakers	
Sean McDermott*	October 23	Memphis Hustle	Memphis Grizzlies	
Juwan Morgan	October 23	Maine Celtics	Boston Celtics	
Cameron Oliver	October 23	South Bay Lakers	Los Angeles Lakers	
EJ Onu	October 23	Texas Legends	Dallas Mavericks	
Theo Pinson	October 23	Maine Celtics	Boston Celtics	
Trevon Scott	October 23	Cleveland Charge	Cleveland Cavaliers	
David Stockton*	October 23	Memphis Hustle	Memphis Grizzlies	
Romeo Weems	October 23	Memphis Hustle	Memphis Grizzlies	
D. J. Carton	October 24	Greensboro Swarm	Charlotte Hornets	
Jalen Crutcher	October 24	Greensboro Swarm	Charlotte Hornets	
Cameron McGriff	October 24	Greensboro Swarm	Charlotte Hornets	
Xavier Sneed*	October 24	Greensboro Swarm	Charlotte Hornets	
Bryce Alford	October 25	Windy City Bulls	Chicago Bulls	
Derrick Alston Jr.	October 25	Salt Lake City Stars	Utah Jazz	
Justin Anderson	October 25	Fort Wayne Mad Ants	Indiana Pacers	
Alex Antetokounmpo	October 25	Raptors 905	Toronto Raptors	
James Banks III	October 25	Birmingham Squadron	New Orleans Pelicans	
Troy Baxter Jr.	October 25	Windy City Bulls	Chicago Bulls	
Jordan Bell	October 25	Santa Cruz Warriors	Golden State Warriors	
Tyler Bey^{†}	October 25	Rio Grande Valley Vipers	Houston Rockets	
Bennie Boatwright	October 25	Fort Wayne Mad Ants	Indiana Pacers	
Marques Bolden	October 25	Salt Lake City Stars	Utah Jazz	
Jordan Bowden*	October 25	Long Island Nets	Brooklyn Nets	
Bryce Brown	October 25	Long Island Nets	Brooklyn Nets	
Charlie Brown Jr.	October 25	Delaware Blue Coats	Oklahoma City Thunder	
Jared Brownridge*	October 25	Delaware Blue Coats	Philadelphia 76ers	
Zylan Cheatham	October 25	Birmingham Squadron	New Orleans Pelicans	
Gary Clark^{†}	October 25	Capitanes de la Ciudad de México	Philadelphia 76ers	
Matt Coleman III	October 25	Stockton Kings	Sacramento Kings	
Derek Culver	October 25	Fort Wayne Mad Ants	Indiana Pacers	
Jared Cunningham	October 25	Motor City Cruise	Detroit Pistons	
Jaime Echenique	October 25	Capital City Go-Go	Washington Wizards	
L. J. Figueroa	October 25	Santa Cruz Warriors	Golden State Warriors	
Jordan Ford*	October 25	Agua Caliente Clippers	Los Angeles Clippers	
Marcus Foster	October 25	Rio Grande Valley Vipers	Houston Rockets	
Harry Giles	October 25	Agua Caliente Clippers	Los Angeles Clippers	
Brandon Goodwin	October 25	Westchester Knicks	New York Knicks	
Jordan Goodwin	October 25	Capital City Go-Go	Washington Wizards	
Josh Gray	October 25	Long Island Nets	Brooklyn Nets	
RaiQuan Gray	October 25	Long Island Nets	Brooklyn Nets	
Ashton Hagans	October 25	Raptors 905	Toronto Raptors	
Josh Hall	October 25	Raptors 905	Toronto Raptors	
Tyler Hall*	October 25	Westchester Knicks	New York Knicks	
Johnny Hamilton	October 25	College Park Skyhawks	Atlanta Hawks	
Jared Harper	October 25	Birmingham Squadron	New Orleans Pelicans	
Shaquille Harrison	October 25	Delaware Blue Coats	Philadelphia 76ers	
Haywood Highsmith*	October 25	Delaware Blue Coats	Philadelphia 76ers	
Malcolm Hill	October 25	Birmingham Squadron	New Orleans Pelicans	
Nate Hinton	October 25	Fort Wayne Mad Ants	Indiana Pacers	
Damien Jefferson	October 25	Stockton Kings	Sacramento Kings	
DaQuan Jeffries	October 25	College Park Skyhawks	Atlanta Hawks	
B. J. Johnson	October 25	Lakeland Magic	Orlando Magic	
Nino Johnson	October 25	Salt Lake City Stars	Utah Jazz	
Mfiondu Kabengele	October 25	Rio Grande Valley Vipers	Houston Rockets	
Braxton Key*	October 25	Delaware Blue Coats	Philadelphia 76ers	
George King	October 25	Agua Caliente Clippers	Los Angeles Clippers	
A. J. Lawson	October 25	College Park Skyhawks	Atlanta Hawks	
Alfonzo McKinnie	October 25	Capitanes de la Ciudad de México	Los Angeles Lakers	
Ade Murkey	October 25	Stockton Kings	Sacramento Kings	
Daniel Oturu	October 25	Windy City Bulls	Chicago Bulls	
Reggie Perry	October 25	Raptors 905	Toronto Raptors	
John Petty Jr.	October 25	Birmingham Squadron	New Orleans Pelicans	
Myles Powell*	October 25	Westchester Knicks	New York Knicks	
Trevelin Queen*	October 25	Rio Grande Valley Vipers	Los Angeles Lakers	
Brandon Rachal	October 25	Long Island Nets	Brooklyn Nets	
Jordan Schakel	October 25	Capital City Go-Go	Washington Wizards	
Devontae Shuler	October 25	Capital City Go-Go	Washington Wizards	
Aamir Simms	October 25	Westchester Knicks	New York Knicks	
Deividas Sirvydis	October 25	Motor City Cruise	Detroit Pistons	
Cassius Stanley	October 25	Motor City Cruise	Detroit Pistons	
D. J. Steward	October 25	Stockton Kings	Sacramento Kings	
Keifer Sykes	October 25	Fort Wayne Mad Ants	Indiana Pacers	
Anthony Tarke	October 25	Motor City Cruise	Detroit Pistons	
Terry Taylor	October 25	Fort Wayne Mad Ants	Indiana Pacers	
MaCio Teague	October 25	Salt Lake City Stars	Utah Jazz	
Emanuel Terry	October 25	Stockton Kings	Sacramento Kings	
Ethan Thompson	October 25	Windy City Bulls	Chicago Bulls	
Axel Toupane*	October 25	Santa Cruz Warriors	Golden State Warriors	
Breein Tyree*	October 25	Raptors 905	Toronto Raptors	
Christian Vital	October 25	Rio Grande Valley Vipers	Houston Rockets	
M. J. Walker	October 25	Westchester Knicks	New York Knicks	
Derrick Walton	October 25	Motor City Cruise	Detroit Pistons	
Ibi Watson	October 25	College Park Skyhawks	Atlanta Hawks	
Quinndary Weatherspoon	October 25	Santa Cruz Warriors	Golden State Warriors	
Moses Wright	October 25	Agua Caliente Clippers	Los Angeles Clippers	
Marcus Zegarowski	October 25	Long Island Nets	Brooklyn Nets	
Brian Bowen	October 26	Iowa Wolves	Minnesota Timberwolves	
Javin DeLaurier	October 26	Wisconsin Herd	Milwaukee Bucks	
Rob Edwards*	October 26	Oklahoma City Blue	Oklahoma City Thunder	
Vincent Edwards	October 26	Iowa Wolves	Minnesota Timberwolves	
Melvin Frazier*	October 26	Oklahoma City Blue	Oklahoma City Thunder	
Wenyen Gabriel	October 26	Wisconsin Herd	Milwaukee Bucks	
Jaylen Hoard*	October 26	Oklahoma City Blue	Oklahoma City Thunder	
Scotty Hopson*	October 26	Oklahoma City Blue	Oklahoma City Thunder	
Justin Jaworski	October 26	Oklahoma City Blue	Oklahoma City Thunder	
Jemerrio Jones	October 26	Wisconsin Herd	Milwaukee Bucks	
Jalen Lecque	October 26	Wisconsin Herd	Milwaukee Bucks	
Matt Lewis	October 26	Iowa Wolves	Minnesota Timberwolves	
Isaiah Miller	October 26	Iowa Wolves	Minnesota Timberwolves	
Trey Mourning*	October 26	Sioux Falls Skyforce	Houston Rockets	
Micah Potter	October 26	Sioux Falls Skyforce	Miami Heat	
Olivier Sarr	October 26	Oklahoma City Blue	Oklahoma City Thunder	
Chris Silva	October 26	Iowa Wolves	Minnesota Timberwolves	
Zavier Simpson*	October 26	Oklahoma City Blue	Oklahoma City Thunder	
Javonte Smart	October 26	Sioux Falls Skyforce	Miami Heat	
Dru Smith	October 26	Sioux Falls Skyforce	Miami Heat	
D. J. Stewart Jr.	October 26	Sioux Falls Skyforce	Miami Heat	
Rayjon Tucker	October 26	Wisconsin Herd	Milwaukee Bucks	
Tremont Waters	October 26	Wisconsin Herd	Milwaukee Bucks	
D. J. Wilson	October 26	Oklahoma City Blue	Oklahoma City Thunder	
Giorgi Bezhanishvili	October 27	Grand Rapids Gold	Denver Nuggets	
Tarik Black	October 27	Grand Rapids Gold	Denver Nuggets	
Jordan Burns	October 27	Austin Spurs	San Antonio Spurs	
Damyean Dotson	October 27	Austin Spurs	San Antonio Spurs	
Aric Holman	October 27	Austin Spurs	San Antonio Spurs	
Denzel Mahoney	October 27	Austin Spurs	San Antonio Spurs	
Jaylen Morris*	October 27	Austin Spurs	San Antonio Spurs	
Davon Reed	October 27	Grand Rapids Gold	Denver Nuggets	
Matt Ryan	October 27	Grand Rapids Gold	Denver Nuggets	
Nate Renfro*	October 27	Austin Spurs	San Antonio Spurs	
Nik Stauskas	October 27	Grand Rapids Gold	Denver Nuggets	
Devin Cannady*	October 28	Lakeland Magic	Orlando Magic	
Hassani Gravett*	October 28	Lakeland Magic	Orlando Magic	
Admiral Schofield	October 28	Lakeland Magic	Orlando Magic	
Jon Teske*	October 28	Lakeland Magic	Orlando Magic	
Jeremiah Tilmon	October 28	Lakeland Magic	Orlando Magic	
Anthony Lamb*^{†}	November 3	Rio Grande Valley Vipers	Houston Rockets	
Carsen Edwards	November 6	Salt Lake City Stars	Memphis Grizzlies	
Mason Jones^{†}	November 6	South Bay Lakers	Philadelphia 76ers	
Stanley Johnson	November 15	South Bay Lakers	Chicago Bulls	
Norvel Pelle*	November 16	Cleveland Charge	New York Knicks	
Langston Galloway	December 12	College Park Skyhawks	Golden State Warriors	
Isaiah Thomas	December 13	Grand Rapids Gold	New Orleans Pelicans	
Davon Reed*	December 15	Grand Rapids Gold	Denver Nuggets	
C. J. Miles	December 17	NBA G League Ignite	Washington Wizards	
Aleem Ford*	December 27	Lakeland Magic	Orlando Magic	
DeJon Jarreau^{†}	December 27	Texas Legends	Indiana Pacers	
Jemerrio Jones*	December 31	Wisconsin Herd	Los Angeles Lakers	
Trevon Scott*	December 31	Cleveland Charge	Cleveland Cavaliers	
Moses Wright*	December 31	Agua Caliente Clippers	Los Angeles Clippers	
George King*	January 1	Agua Caliente Clippers	Dallas Mavericks	
Juwan Morgan*	January 1	Maine Celtics	Toronto Raptors	
Ade Murkey*	January 1	Stockton Kings	Sacramento Kings	
Jordan Schakel*	January 1	Capital City Go-Go	Washington Wizards	
Charlie Brown Jr.*	January 2	Delaware Blue Coats	Dallas Mavericks	
Javin DeLaurier*	January 2	Wisconsin Herd	Milwaukee Bucks	
Tyler Hall*	January 2	Westchester Knicks	New York Knicks	
Zylan Cheatham*	January 3	Birmingham Squadron	Miami Heat	
Cheick Diallo*	January 3	Motor City Cruise	Detroit Pistons	
Daniel Oturu*	January 3	Windy City Bulls	Toronto Raptors	
Anthony Barber*	January 4	College Park Skyhawks	Atlanta Hawks	
Shaq Buchanan*	January 4	Memphis Hustle	Memphis Grizzlies	
Malik Ellison*	January 4	College Park Skyhawks	Atlanta Hawks	
B. J. Johnson*	January 4	Lakeland Magic	Orlando Magic	
Cassius Stanley*	January 4	Motor City Cruise	Detroit Pistons	
Emanuel Terry*	January 4	Stockton Kings	Phoenix Suns	
Derrick Walton*	January 4	Motor City Cruise	Detroit Pistons	
Deonte Burton	January 5	Maine Celtics	Oklahoma City Thunder	
Jarron Cumberland*	January 5	Delaware Blue Coats	Portland Trail Blazers	
Justin James*	January 5	Cleveland Charge	New Orleans Pelicans	
Cameron McGriff*	January 5	Greensboro Swarm	Portland Trail Blazers	
Jerome Robinson	January 5	Santa Cruz Warriors	Washington Wizards	
Deividas Sirvydis*	January 5	Motor City Cruise	Detroit Pistons	
Brandon Williams*	January 5	Westchester Knicks	Portland Trail Blazers	
Rob Edwards*	January 6	Oklahoma City Blue	Oklahoma City Thunder	
Scotty Hopson*	January 6	Oklahoma City Blue	Oklahoma City Thunder	
Georgios Kalaitzakis	January 6	Oklahoma City Blue	Milwaukee Bucks	
Olivier Sarr*	January 6	Oklahoma City Blue	Oklahoma City Thunder	
Jordan Goodwin*	January 7	Capital City Go-Go	Washington Wizards	
Hassani Gravett*	January 7	Lakeland Magic	Orlando Magic	
Xavier Sneed*	January 7	Greensboro Swarm	Memphis Grizzlies	
Craig Sword*	January 7	Capital City Go-Go	Washington Wizards	
Chris Clemons*	January 8	Maine Celtics	Atlanta Hawks	
Gerald Green	January 8	Rio Grande Valley Vipers	Houston Rockets	
Feron Hunt*	January 8	Texas Legends	New Orleans Pelicans	
DeJon Jarreau*	January 8	Texas Legends	Houston Rockets	
Cameron Oliver*	January 8	South Bay Lakers	Atlanta Hawks	
Trayvon Palmer*	January 8	Motor City Cruise	Detroit Pistons	
Reggie Perry*	January 8	Raptors 905	Portland Trail Blazers	
Micah Potter*	January 8	Sioux Falls Skyforce	Detroit Pistons	
Justin Tillman*	January 8	College Park Skyhawks	Atlanta Hawks	
Jordan Bell*	January 9	Santa Cruz Warriors	Chicago Bulls	
Jared Harper*^{†}	January 9	Birmingham Squadron	New Orleans Pelicans	
Shaquille Harrison*	January 9	Delaware Blue Coats	Brooklyn Nets	
Haywood Highsmith*	January 9	Delaware Blue Coats	Miami Heat	
Nate Hinton*	January 9	Fort Wayne Mad Ants	Indiana Pacers	
Jaylen Hoard*	January 9	Oklahoma City Blue	Oklahoma City Thunder	
Aric Holman*	January 9	Austin Spurs	Miami Heat	
Malik Newman*	January 9	Cleveland Charge	Cleveland Cavaliers	
Jaysean Paige*	January 9	Maine Celtics	Detroit Pistons	
M. J. Walker*	January 9	Westchester Knicks	Phoenix Suns	
Ahmad Caver*	January 10	Memphis Hustle	Indiana Pacers	
Jaime Echenique*	January 10	Capital City Go-Go	Washington Wizards	
Freddie Gillespie*	January 10	Memphis Hustle	Orlando Magic	
Jodie Meeks	January 10	Raptors 905	Toronto Raptors	
Justin Anderson*	January 11	Fort Wayne Mad Ants	Indiana Pacers	
Damyean Dotson*	January 11	Austin Spurs	New York Knicks	
Kris Dunn	January 11	Agua Caliente Clippers	Memphis Grizzlies	
DaQuan Jeffries*	January 11	College Park Skyhawks	Memphis Grizzlies	
Carlik Jones*	January 11	Texas Legends	Denver Nuggets	
Mac McClung	January 11	South Bay Lakers	Chicago Bulls	
Jaylen Morris*	January 11	Austin Spurs	San Antonio Spurs	
Nik Stauskas*	January 11	Grand Rapids Gold	Miami Heat	
Rayjon Tucker*	January 11	Wisconsin Herd	Denver Nuggets	
Chaundee Brown*	January 12	South Bay Lakers	Atlanta Hawks	
Tacko Fall*^{†}	January 12	Cleveland Charge	Cleveland Cavaliers	
Jay Huff*^{†}	January 12	South Bay Lakers	Los Angeles Lakers	
Tremont Waters*	January 12	Wisconsin Herd	Washington Wizards	
Luke Kornet*	January 13	Maine Celtics	Milwaukee Bucks	
Jon Teske*	January 13	Lakeland Magic	Memphis Grizzlies	
Mario Chalmers	January 14	Sioux Falls Skyforce	Miami Heat	
Justin Jackson*	January 14	Texas Legends	Phoenix Suns	
Brandon Knight*	January 14	Sioux Falls Skyforce	Dallas Mavericks	
Petr Cornelie*^{†}	January 15	Grand Rapids Gold	Denver Nuggets	
JaQuori McLaughlin^{†}	January 15	Santa Cruz Warriors	Dallas Mavericks	
Braxton Key*	January 16	Delaware Blue Coats	Philadelphia 76ers	
Anthony Lamb*	January 16	Rio Grande Valley Vipers	San Antonio Spurs	
Javonte Smart^{†}	January 16	Sioux Falls Skyforce	Milwaukee Bucks	
Greg Monroe*	January 17	Capital City Go-Go	Washington Wizards	
D. J. Wilson*	January 17	Oklahoma City Blue	Toronto Raptors	
Aaron Henry*^{†}	January 18	Delaware Blue Coats	Philadelphia 76ers	
Cassius Stanley*	January 18	Motor City Cruise	Detroit Pistons	
Jeff Dowtin	January 19	Lakeland Magic	Milwaukee Bucks	
Olivier Sarr*	January 19	Oklahoma City Blue	Oklahoma City Thunder	
C. J. Miles*	January 20	NBA G League Ignite	Boston Celtics	
Norvel Pelle*	January 20	Cleveland Charge	Utah Jazz	
Langston Galloway*	January 21	College Park Skyhawks	Milwaukee Bucks	
Denzel Valentine	January 21	Maine Celtics	Utah Jazz	
Allen Crabbe	January 22	Westchester Knicks	Minnesota Timberwolves	
Devon Dotson*^{†}	January 22	Windy City Bulls	Chicago Bulls	
Wenyen Gabriel*	January 23	Wisconsin Herd	Los Angeles Clippers	
Paris Bass*	January 24	South Bay Lakers	Phoenix Suns	
Zylan Cheatham	January 24	Birmingham Squadron	Utah Jazz	
Xavier Moon*	January 24	Agua Caliente Clippers	Los Angeles Clippers	
Wes Iwundu	January 25	Cleveland Charge	Atlanta Hawks	
Dakota Mathias*	January 25	Texas Legends	Memphis Grizzlies	
Treveon Graham*	January 27	Long Island Nets	Atlanta Hawks	
Shaquille Harrison*	January 29	Delaware Blue Coats	Memphis Grizzlies	
Ryan Arcidiacono*	January 30	Maine Celtics	New York Knicks	
Chandler Hutchison^{†}	January 31	Sioux Falls Skyforce	Phoenix Suns	
Cassius Stanley*	January 31	Motor City Cruise	Detroit Pistons	
Wenyen Gabriel*	February 8	Wisconsin Herd	New Orleans Pelicans	
Chris Silva*	February 10	Iowa Wolves	Miami Heat	
Patrick McCaw	February 11	Delaware Blue Coats	Toronto Raptors	
Justin Jackson*	February 12	Texas Legends	Phoenix Suns	
Reggie Perry*	February 14	Raptors 905	Indiana Pacers	
Isaiah Thomas*	February 14	Grand Rapids Gold	Dallas Mavericks	
Zylan Cheatham*	February 15	Birmingham Squadron	New Orleans Pelicans	
Greg Monroe*	February 15	Capital City Go-Go	Milwaukee Bucks	
Robert Woodard II	February 19	Iowa Wolves	Sacramento Kings	
Daulton Hommes*^{†}	February 21	Birmingham Squadron	New Orleans Pelicans	
Jahmi'us Ramsey	February 23	Birmingham Squadron	Sacramento Kings	
Louis King^{†}	February 25	Westchester Knicks	Sacramento Kings	
Armoni Brooks	February 28	College Park Skyhawks	Houston Rockets	
Mychal Mulder^{†}	March 3	Sioux Falls Skyforce	Orlando Magic	
D. J. Wilson*	March 7	Oklahoma City Blue	Toronto Raptors	
Joël Ayayi*^{†}	March 11	Capital City Go-Go	Washington Wizards	
Tyreke Evans	March 16	Wisconsin Herd	Indiana Pacers	
Kelan Martin	March 18	Grand Rapids Gold	Boston Celtics	
Darren Collison	March 24	South Bay Lakers	Los Angeles Lakers	
Kyle Guy^{†}	March 27	Cleveland Charge	Miami Heat	
Tyrone Wallace*	March 29	Long Island Nets	New Orleans Pelicans	
Jeff Dowtin*	April 1	Lakeland Magic	Orlando Magic	

=== Going overseas ===
The following players were on NBA rosters during the previous season, but chose to sign with overseas teams after their contract expired and they became free agents. The players became free agents at the end of the season unless noted otherwise. The list also includes unsigned 2021 draft picks who signed with overseas teams, but excludes unsigned 2021 draft picks who were already playing overseas before the draft.

*	Denotes international players who returned to their home country
**	Denotes international players who returned to their club found/owned at their home country

Player	Date signed	New team	New country	Former NBA team	Ref
James Nunnally	June 27	Maccabi Playtika Tel Aviv	Israel	New Orleans Pelicans (Previously on a two-way contract)	
Greg Whittington	June 30	Lokomotiv Kuban	Russia	Denver Nuggets (Waived on April 9; previously on a two-way contract)	
Cameron Reynolds	July 3	Dolomiti Energia Trento	Italy	Houston Rockets (10-day contract expired on May 17)	
Rodions Kurucs	July 7	Partizan NIS	Serbia	Milwaukee Bucks (Waived on May 12)	
Matthew Dellavedova*	July 9	Melbourne United	Australia	Cleveland Cavaliers	
Nicolò Melli*	July 9	AX Armani Exchange Olimpia Milan	Italy	Dallas Mavericks	
Troy Daniels	July 12	AX Armani Exchange Olimpia Milan	Italy	Denver Nuggets (Contract expired on September 27, 2020)	
Henry Ellenson	July 13	Monbus Obradoiro	Spain	Toronto Raptors (10-day contract expired on March 20)	
Kostas Antetokounmpo	July 16	LDLC ASVEL	France	Los Angeles Lakers (Previously on a two-way contract)	
Shabazz Napier	July 19	Zenit Saint Petersburg	Russia	Washington Wizards (Contract expired on August 14, 2020)	
Donta Hall	August 5	AS Monaco Basket	France	Orlando Magic	
Alen Smailagić*	August 6	Partizan NIS	Serbia	Golden State Warriors (Waived on August 4)	
Cristiano Felício	August 9	ratiopharm Ulm	Germany	Chicago Bulls	
Nico Mannion* (RFA)	August 10	Virtus Segafredo Bologna	Italy	Golden State Warriors (Previously on a two-way contract)	
Joe Chealey	August 11	Altshuler Shaham Gilboa Galil	Israel	Charlotte Hornets (10-day contract expired on March 12, 2020)	
Jalen Harris	August 14	Vanoli Cremona	Italy	Toronto Raptors (Previously on a two-way contract)	
Filip Petrušev	August 16	Anadolu Efes	Turkey	Philadelphia 76ers (Unsigned draft pick)	
Jaylen Adams	August 22	Sydney Kings	Australia	Milwaukee Bucks (Waived on March 4; previously on a two-way contract)	
Balša Koprivica*	August 23	Partizan NIS	Serbia	Detroit Pistons (Unsigned draft pick)	
Emmanuel Mudiay	August 24	Žalgiris Kaunas	Lithuania	Utah Jazz (Contract expired on September 2, 2020)	
Thon Maker	August 25	Hapoel Bank Yahav Jerusalem	Israel	Cleveland Cavaliers (Waived on January 13)	
Justin Patton	August 25	Hapoel Yossi Avrahami Eilat	Israel	Houston Rockets (Waived on April 3)	
Robert Franks	August 28	Brisbane Bullets	Australia	Orlando Magic (Waived on April 27)	
Caleb Homesley	September 3	Hamburg Towers	Germany	Washington Wizards (Waived on August 5)	
Ty-Shon Alexander	September 8	Virtus Segafredo Bologna	Italy	Phoenix Suns (Waived on August 26; previously on a two-way contract)	
Amida Brimah	September 10	Mets de Guaynabo	Puerto Rico	Indiana Pacers (Waived on August 24; previously on a two-way contract)	
Noah Vonleh	September 15	Shanghai Sharks	China	Brooklyn Nets (Waived on February 23)	
Mike James	September 16	AS Monaco Basket	France	Brooklyn Nets	
Jarrell Brantley	September 18	UNICS Kazan	Russia	Utah Jazz (Waived on September 16; previously on a two-way contract)	
Rondae Hollis-Jefferson	September 23	Beşiktaş Icrypex	Turkey	Portland Trail Blazers	
JaKarr Sampson	September 27	Virtus Segafredo Bologna	Italy	Indiana Pacers	
Jeremiah Martin	October 3	Sky Sport Breakers	New Zealand	Cleveland Cavaliers (Previously on a two-way contract)	
Yogi Ferrell	October 10	Panathinaikos BC OPAP	Greece	Los Angeles Clippers (Waived on September 5)	
Elijah Bryant	October 18	Anadolu Efes	Turkey	Milwaukee Bucks (Waived on October 14)	
Dwayne Bacon	October 27	AS Monaco Basket	France	New York Knicks (Waived on October 14)	
Quinn Cook	October 27	Lokomotiv Kuban	Russia	Portland Trail Blazers (Waived on October 16)	
Anžejs Pasečņiks	November 9	Coosur Real Betis	Spain	Washington Wizards (Waived on January 17)	
Terrance Ferguson	November 11	AEK B.C.	Greece	New York Knicks (Waived on March 29)	
Sindarius Thornwell	November 11	ratiopharm Ulm	Germany	Orlando Magic (Previously on a two-way contract)	
Johnny O'Bryant III	November 14	Wonju DB Promy	South Korea	Milwaukee Bucks (Waived on October 11)	
Marc Gasol**	November 22	Bàsquet Girona	Spain	Memphis Grizzlies (Waived on September 15)	
Khyri Thomas	November 24	Surne Bilbao Basket	Spain	Houston Rockets (Waived on October 6)	
Adam Mokoka*	November 28	Nanterre 92	France	Chicago Bulls (Previously on a two-way contract)	
Sam Dekker	December 3	Bahçeşehir Koleji	Turkey	Toronto Raptors (Waived on November 6)	
Dante Exum	December 8	FC Barcelona	Spain	Houston Rockets (Waived on October 16)	
Chasson Randle	December 15	Sky Sport Breakers	New Zealand	Phoenix Suns (Waived on October 16)	
Jahlil Okafor	January 10	Zhejiang Lions	China	Atlanta Hawks (Waived on October 11)	
T. J. Leaf	January 12	Guangzhou Loong Lions	China	Portland Trail Blazers	
Gabriel Deck	January 18	Real Madrid Baloncesto	Spain	Oklahoma City Thunder (Waived on January 6)	
Wayne Selden Jr.	January 18	HDI Sigorta Afyon Belediye	Turkey	New York Knicks (Waived on January 3)	
Matt Mooney	January 30	Unicaja	Spain	New York Knicks (10-day contract expired on January 9)	
Kevin Pangos	February 20	CSKA Moscow	Russia	Cleveland Cavaliers (Waived on February 19)	
James Ennis III	March 7	Hapoel Haifa	Israel	Denver Nuggets (10-day contract expired on January 20)	
John Henson	March 9	Mets de Guaynabo	Puerto Rico	New York Knicks (10-day contract expired on April 14)	

=== Waived ===
	Denotes player who did not clear waivers because his contract was claimed by another team
^{†}	Denotes players who were on a two-way contract
	Denotes players whose contracts were voided

Player	Date Waived	Former Team	Ref
Jalen Harris	July 1	Toronto Raptors	
Tyler Cook	July 31	Detroit Pistons	
Cory Joseph	July 31	Detroit Pistons	
Norvel Pelle	July 31	New York Knicks	
Jontay Porter	July 31	Memphis Grizzlies	
Deividas Sirvydis	July 31	Detroit Pistons	
Matt Thomas	August 1	Utah Jazz	
DeAndre' Bembry	August 3	Toronto Raptors	
George Hill	August 3	Philadelphia 76ers	
Rodney Hood	August 3	Toronto Raptors	
Paul Watson	August 3	Toronto Raptors	
Aron Baynes	August 4	Toronto Raptors	
Alfonzo McKinnie	August 4	Los Angeles Lakers	
Alen Smailagić	August 4	Golden State Warriors	
Caleb Homesley	August 5	Washington Wizards	
Rodney McGruder	August 6	Detroit Pistons	
Kemba Walker	August 6	Oklahoma City Thunder	
Caleb Martin	August 7	Charlotte Hornets	
Dwayne Bacon	August 8	Orlando Magic	
Justin James	August 15	Sacramento Kings	
Rayjon Tucker^{†}	August 18	Philadelphia 76ers	
Amida Brimah^{†}	August 24	Indiana Pacers	
Sean McDermott^{†}	August 25	Memphis Grizzlies	
Ty-Shon Alexander^{†}	August 26	Phoenix Suns	
Nate Hinton^{†}	August 27	Dallas Mavericks	
Anthony Tolliver	August 27	Philadelphia 76ers	
Rajon Rondo	August 28	Memphis Grizzlies	
Alize Johnson	September 3	Brooklyn Nets	
EJ Onu	September 3	Dallas Mavericks	
Chandler Hutchison	September 4	San Antonio Spurs	
Yogi Ferrell	September 5	Los Angeles Clippers	
DeAndre Jordan	September 6	Detroit Pistons	
Jahlil Okafor	September 9	Brooklyn Nets	
Damyean Dotson	September 10	Cleveland Cavaliers	
Josh Hall^{†}	September 12	Oklahoma City Thunder	
Marc Gasol	September 15	Memphis Grizzlies	
Trevon Scott	September 15	Cleveland Cavaliers	
Jarrell Brantley^{†}	September 16	Utah Jazz	
Tyler Bey	September 17	Houston Rockets	
Carsen Edwards	September 23	Memphis Grizzlies	
Jordan Ford	September 23	Los Angeles Clippers	
Daniel Oturu	September 23	Memphis Grizzlies	
Mamadi Diakite	September 24	Milwaukee Bucks	
Matthew Hurt^{†}	September 24	Houston Rockets	
Charlie Brown Jr.	September 26	Oklahoma City Thunder	
Elijah Bryant	September 26	Milwaukee Bucks	
Anthony Tarke	September 27	Detroit Pistons	
Sam Dekker	November 6	Toronto Raptors	
Sekou Doumbouya^{†}	November 16	Los Angeles Lakers	
Justin Robinson^{†}	November 29	Milwaukee Bucks	
Georgios Kalaitzakis	December 3	Milwaukee Bucks	
DeJon Jarreau^{†}	December 15	Indiana Pacers	
Danuel House	December 18	Houston Rockets	
Grant Riller^{†}	December 19	Philadelphia 76ers	
Chaundee Brown^{†}	December 21	Los Angeles Lakers	
Daulton Hommes^{†}	December 21	New Orleans Pelicans	
Alize Johnson	December 26	Chicago Bulls	
Eugene Omoruyi^{†}	December 26	Dallas Mavericks	
Anthony Tolliver	December 27	New Orleans Pelicans	
Brad Wanamaker	December 27	Indiana Pacers	
Carlik Jones	December 31	Dallas Mavericks	
Trevon Scott	December 31	Cleveland Cavaliers	
Sam Merrill	January 1	Memphis Grizzlies	
Jeff Dowtin^{†}	January 2	Golden State Warriors	
Wayne Selden Jr.	January 3	New York Knicks	
Gabriel Deck	January 4	Oklahoma City Thunder	
Chandler Hutchison^{†}	January 4	Phoenix Suns	
Emanuel Terry	January 4	Phoenix Suns	
Denzel Valentine	January 5	New York Knicks	
DeMarcus Cousins	January 6	Milwaukee Bucks	
Kelan Martin	January 6	Indiana Pacers	
Mychal Mulder^{†}	January 6	Orlando Magic	
Gary Clark	January 7	New Orleans Pelicans	
Miye Oni	January 7	Oklahoma City Thunder	
Jabari Parker	January 7	Boston Celtics	
Petr Cornelie^{†}	January 9	Denver Nuggets	
Tacko Fall^{†}	January 9	Cleveland Cavaliers	
Jared Harper^{†}	January 9	New Orleans Pelicans	
JaQuori McLaughlin^{†}	January 10	Dallas Mavericks	
Aaron Henry^{†}	January 11	Philadelphia 76ers	
Jay Huff^{†}	January 12	Los Angeles Lakers	
Ryan Arcidiacono	January 13	New York Knicks	
Malik Fitts^{†}	January 13	Utah Jazz	
Javonte Smart^{†}	January 13	Milwaukee Bucks	
Willie Cauley-Stein	January 15	Dallas Mavericks	
Marcus Garrett^{†}	January 16	Miami Heat	
Devon Dotson^{†}	January 17	Chicago Bulls	
Solomon Hill	January 19	New York Knicks	
DeMarcus Cousins	January 28	Denver Nuggets	
Cody Zeller	February 8	Portland Trail Blazers	
Mamadi Diakite	February 9	Oklahoma City Thunder	
D. J. Augustin	February 10	Houston Rockets	
DeAndre' Bembry	February 10	Brooklyn Nets	
Armoni Brooks^{†}	February 10	Houston Rockets	
Moses Brown	February 10	Dallas Mavericks	
Michael Carter-Williams	February 10	Orlando Magic	
PJ Dozier	February 10	Orlando Magic	
Drew Eubanks	February 10	Toronto Raptors	
Justin Jackson	February 10	Phoenix Suns	
E'Twaun Moore	February 10	Orlando Magic	
Abdel Nader	February 10	Phoenix Suns	
Jahmi'us Ramsey	February 10	Sacramento Kings	
Paul Watson^{†}	February 10	Oklahoma City Thunder	
Robert Woodard II	February 10	Sacramento Kings	
KZ Okpala	February 11	Oklahoma City Thunder	
Enes Kanter Freedom	February 14	Houston Rockets	
Goran Dragić	February 15	San Antonio Spurs	
Louis King^{†}	February 17	Sacramento Kings	
Tristan Thompson	February 17	Indiana Pacers	
Alfonzo McKinnie	February 19	Chicago Bulls	
Kevin Pangos	February 19	Cleveland Cavaliers	
Dennis Smith Jr.	February 21	Portland Trail Blazers	
Jevon Carter	February 22	Brooklyn Nets	
Tomáš Satoranský	February 26	San Antonio Spurs	
Sekou Doumbouya^{†}	March 1	Los Angeles Lakers	
DeAndre Jordan	March 1	Los Angeles Lakers	
Willie Cauley-Stein	March 3	Philadelphia 76ers	
D. J. Wilson	March 6	Toronto Raptors	
Joël Ayayi^{†}	March 8	Washington Wizards	
Alize Johnson	March 11	New Orleans Pelicans	
Luka Šamanić^{†}	March 17	New York Knicks	
Kyle Guy^{†}	March 24	Miami Heat	
Semi Ojeleye	March 26	Los Angeles Clippers	
Tyrone Wallace	March 28	New Orleans Pelicans	
Chris Smith^{†}	April 3	Detroit Pistons	
Olivier Sarr^{†}	April 6	Oklahoma City Thunder	
Trevor Ariza	April 7	Los Angeles Lakers	
DeAndre' Bembry	April 7	Milwaukee Bucks	
James Johnson	April 7	Brooklyn Nets	
Frank Kaminsky	April 7	Phoenix Suns	
RJ Nembhard	April 7	Cleveland Cavaliers	
Keifer Sykes	April 7	Indiana Pacers	

==== Training camp cuts ====
All players listed did not make the final roster.
^{†} On a two-way contract.
^{c} Claimed off waivers by another team.

Atlanta Hawks	Boston Celtics	Brooklyn Nets	Charlotte Hornets	Chicago Bulls
Johnny Hamilton; DaQuan Jeffries; A. J. Lawson; Jahlil Okafor; Ibi Watson	Ryan Arcidiacono; Chris Clemons; Luke Kornet; Garrison Mathews^{c}; Juwan Morgan; Jabari Parker; Theo Pinson	Jordan Bowden; Bryce Brown; Devontae Cacok^{c}; Josh Gray; Brandon Rachal; Edmond Sumner	LiAngelo Ball; D. J. Carton; Jalen Crutcher; Wes Iwundu; Cameron McGriff; Xavier Sneed	Bryce Alford; Troy Baxter Jr.; Stanley Johnson; Daniel Oturu; Ethan Thompson
Cleveland Cavaliers	Dallas Mavericks	Denver Nuggets	Detroit Pistons	Golden State Warriors
Mitch Ballock; Kyle Guy; Justin James; Mfiondu Kabengele; Brodric Thomas^{†}	Feron Hunt; Justin Jackson; Carlik Jones; EJ Onu; Tyrell Terry	Giorgi Bezhanishvili; Tarik Black; Davon Reed; Matt Ryan; Nik Stauskas	Jared Cunningham; Deividas Sirvydis; Cassius Stanley; Derrick Walton	Jordan Bell; Avery Bradley^{c}; L. J. Figueroa; Langston Galloway; Mychal Mulder; Gary Payton II; Axel Toupane; Quinndary Weatherspoon
Houston Rockets	Indiana Pacers	Los Angeles Clippers	Los Angeles Lakers	Memphis Grizzlies
Tyler Bey^{†}; Sekou Doumbouya; Dante Exum; Marcus Foster; Mfiondu Kabengele; Anthony Lamb^{†}; Khyri Thomas; Christian Vital	Justin Anderson; Bennie Boatwright; Derek Culver; Nate Hinton; Keifer Sykes; Terry Taylor	Nate Darling; Harry Giles; George King; Moses Wright	Joël Ayayi^{†c}; Chaundee Brown; Frank Mason III; Mac McClung; Cameron Oliver; Trevelin Queen	Shaq Buchanan; Ahmad Caver; Kris Dunn; Matthew Hurt; Sean McDermott; David Stockton; Romeo Weems
Miami Heat	Milwaukee Bucks	Minnesota Timberwolves	New Orleans Pelicans	New York Knicks
Micah Potter; Javonte Smart; Dru Smith; D. J. Stewart Jr.	Elijah Bryant; Javin DeLaurier; Wenyen Gabriel; Jemerrio Jones; Jalen Lecque; Johnny O'Bryant III; Rayjon Tucker; Tremont Waters	Brian Bowen; Vincent Edwards; Matt Lewis; Isaiah Miller; Chris Silva	James Banks III; Zylan Cheatham; Wenyen Gabriel; Jared Harper; Malcolm Hill; John Petty Jr.	Dwayne Bacon; Brandon Goodwin; Tyler Hall; Brandon Knight; Myles Powell; Aamir Simms; Luca Vildoza; M. J. Walker
Oklahoma City Thunder	Orlando Magic	Philadelphia 76ers	Phoenix Suns	Portland Trail Blazers
Mamadi Diakite; Rob Edwards; Melvin Frazier; Jaylen Hoard; Scotty Hopson; Justin Jaworski; Olivier Sarr; Zavier Simpson; D. J. Wilson	Devin Cannady; Jeff Dowtin^{c}; Hassani Gravett; B. J. Johnson; Admiral Schofield; Jon Teske; Jeremiah Tilmon	Jared Brownridge; Shaquille Harrison; Haywood Highsmith; Braxton Key	Chasson Randle	Marquese Chriss; Quinn Cook; Patrick Patterson
Sacramento Kings	San Antonio Spurs	Toronto Raptors	Utah Jazz	Washington Wizards
Matt Coleman III; Damien Jefferson; Ade Murkey; D. J. Steward; Emanuel Terry	Al-Farouq Aminu; Jordan Burns; Damyean Dotson; Aric Holman; Denzel Mahoney; Jaylen Morris; Nate Renfro; Luka Šamanić	Alex Antetokounmpo; Freddie Gillespie; Ashton Hagans; Josh Hall; Reggie Perry; Breein Tyree; Ish Wainright	Derrick Alston Jr.; Marques Bolden; Justin James^{†}; Nino Johnson; MaCio Teague	Jaime Echenique; Jordan Goodwin; Jay Huff; Jordan Schakel; Devontae Shuler

== Draft ==
The 2021 NBA draft was held on July 29, 2021, at Barclays Center in Brooklyn, New York. In two rounds of draft, 60 amateur United States college basketball players and other eligible players, including international players, were selected. The following players signed a regular rookie contract unless noted otherwise.

=== First round ===
Pick	Player	Date signed	Team (Note: Team denotes the team that holds the players' draft rights at the time of contract signing. Teams in parentheses denotes the teams that drafted the players before any trade occurred.)	Ref
1	Cade Cunningham	August 8	Detroit Pistons	
2	Jalen Green	August 4	Houston Rockets	
3	Evan Mobley	August 3	Cleveland Cavaliers	
4	Scottie Barnes	August 7	Toronto Raptors	
5	Jalen Suggs	August 3	Orlando Magic	
6	Josh Giddey	August 7	Oklahoma City Thunder	
7	Jonathan Kuminga	August 3	Golden State Warriors	
8	Franz Wagner	August 3	Orlando Magic	
9	Davion Mitchell	August 5	Sacramento Kings	
10	Ziaire Williams	August 8	Memphis Grizzlies (rights acquired from New Orleans)	
11	James Bouknight	August 3	Charlotte Hornets	
12	Joshua Primo	August 11	San Antonio Spurs	
13	Chris Duarte	August 4	Indiana Pacers	
14	Moses Moody	August 5	Golden State Warriors	
15	Corey Kispert	August 4	Washington Wizards	
16	Alperen Şengün	August 6	Houston Rockets (rights acquired from Oklahoma City)	
17	Trey Murphy III	August 9	New Orleans Pelicans (rights acquired from Memphis)	
18	Tre Mann	August 7	Oklahoma City Thunder	
19	Kai Jones	August 3	Charlotte Hornets (rights acquired from New York)	
20	Jalen Johnson	August 4	Atlanta Hawks	
21	Keon Johnson	August 6	Los Angeles Clippers (rights acquired from New York)	
22	Isaiah Jackson	August 11	Indiana Pacers (rights acquired from LA Lakers)	
23	Usman Garuba	August 15	Houston Rockets	
24	Josh Christopher	August 6	Houston Rockets	
25	Quentin Grimes	August 6	New York Knicks (rights acquired from LA Clippers)	
26	Nah'Shon Hyland	August 4	Denver Nuggets	
27	Cameron Thomas	August 5	Brooklyn Nets	
28	Jaden Springer	August 4	Philadelphia 76ers	
29	Day'Ron Sharpe	August 6	Brooklyn Nets (rights acquired from Phoenix)	
30	Santi Aldama	August 8	Memphis Grizzlies (rights acquired from Utah)	

=== Second round ===
Pick	Player	Date signed	Team	Ref
31	Isaiah Todd	August 10	Washington Wizards (rights acquired from Milwaukee through Indiana)	
32	Jeremiah Robinson-Earl	August 10	Oklahoma City Thunder (rights acquired from New York)	
33	Jason Preston	August 9	Los Angeles Clippers (rights acquired from Orlando)	
34	Rokas Jokubaitis	—	New York Knicks (rights acquired from Oklahoma City)	
35	Herbert Jones	August 16	New Orleans Pelicans	
36	Miles McBride	August 6	New York Knicks (rights acquired from Oklahoma City)	
37	JT Thor	August 6	Charlotte Hornets (rights acquired from Detroit)	
38	Ayo Dosunmu	August 12	Chicago Bulls	
39	Neemias Queta (Signed two-way contract)	August 8	Sacramento Kings	
40	Jared Butler	August 11	Utah Jazz (rights acquired from New Orleans through Memphis)	
41	Joe Wieskamp (Signed two-way contract)	September 7	San Antonio Spurs	
42	Isaiah Livers	August 6	Detroit Pistons	
43	Greg Brown	August 12	Portland Trail Blazers (rights acquired from New Orleans)	
44	Kessler Edwards (Signed two-way contract)	August 16	Brooklyn Nets	
45	Juhann Begarin	—	Boston Celtics	
46	Dalano Banton	August 13	Toronto Raptors	
47	David Johnson (Signed two-way contract)	August 8	Toronto Raptors	
48	Sharife Cooper (Signed two-way contract)	August 4	Atlanta Hawks	
49	Marcus Zegarowski	—	Brooklyn Nets	
50	Filip Petrušev	—	Philadelphia 76ers	
51	Brandon Boston Jr.	August 9	Los Angeles Clippers (rights acquired from Memphis through New Orleans)	
52	Luka Garza (Signed two-way contract)	August 16	Detroit Pistons	
53	Charles Bassey	September 24	Philadelphia 76ers	
54	Sandro Mamukelashvili (Signed two-way contract)	August 4	Milwaukee Bucks (rights acquired from Indiana)	
55	Aaron Wiggins (Signed two-way contract)	August 14	Oklahoma City Thunder	
56	Scottie Lewis (Signed two-way contract)	August 3	Charlotte Hornets	
57	Balša Koprivica	—	Detroit Pistons (rights acquired from Charlotte)	
58	Jericho Sims (Signed two-way contract)	August 8	New York Knicks	
59	RaiQuan Gray	—	Brooklyn Nets	
60	Georgios Kalaitzakis	August 10	Milwaukee Bucks (rights acquired from Indiana)	

=== Previous years' draftees ===
Draft	Pick	Player	Date signed	Team	Previous team	Ref
2016	53	Petr Cornelie (Signed two-way contract)	September 17	Denver Nuggets	Élan Béarnais (France)	
2018	55	Arnoldas Kulboka (Signed two-way contract)	August 3	Charlotte Hornets	RETAbet Bilbao Basket (Spain)	
2020	23	Leandro Bolmaro	September 17	Minnesota Timberwolves	FC Barcelona (Spain)	
2020	37	Vít Krejčí	September 2	Oklahoma City Thunder	Oklahoma City Blue (NBA G League)	
2020	44	Marko Simonović	August 12	Chicago Bulls	Mega Soccerbet (Serbia)	

=== Renounced draft rights ===
Draft	Pick	Player	Date of rights' renouncement	Former team	Ref
2016	44	Isaïa Cordinier	September 15	Brooklyn Nets	
2019	56	Jaylen Hands	July 29	Detroit Pistons	
