= 2023 CEBL–U Sports Draft =

Canadian Elite Basketball League draft

General information
- Sport: Basketball
- Date(s): April 19, 2023

Overview
- 20 total selections in 2 rounds
- League: Canadian Elite Basketball League
- Teams: 10
- First selection: Simon Hildebrandt, Winnipeg Sea Bears

The 2023 CEBL–U Sports Draft is the Fifth CEBL Draft, being revealed on April 19. 10 Canadian Elite Basketball League (CEBL) teams will select 20 athletes in total.

== Format ==
the draft order for the first round is determine by how the teams finished in the 2022 CEBL season and the 1 new expansion team order of joining the league, followed by Montreal Alliance finishing last place last season so they get 2nd overall. A "snake draft" was used, with the order reversing in even-numbered rounds, and the original order in odd-numbered rounds. The draft order for the first round was determined as follows:

1. Winnipeg Sea Bears
2. Montreal Alliance
3. Calgary Surge
4. Edmonton Stingers
5. Saskatchewan Rattlers
6. Vancouver Bandits
7. Ottawa Blackjacks
8. Niagara River Lions
9. Scarborough Shooting Stars
10. Brampton Honey Badgers

== Eligibility ==
Players may completed their university eligibility in 2021–22, or they may be returning to their university team in the fall and be classified within the CEBL's U SPORTS Developmental player program. They must qualify as Canadian, and they must have completed at least one full year of eligibility at their U SPORTS institution. Each CEBL club must have at least one U SPORTS player on its 10-man active roster at all times.

== Player selection ==
=== Round 1 ===
Pick	Team	Player	Hometown	School team
1	Winnipeg Sea Bears	Simon Hildebrandt	Winnipeg, Manitoba	University of Manitoba
2	Montreal Alliance	Aryan Sharma	Milton, Ontario	Western University
3	Calgary Surge	Mason Bourcier	Kelowna, B.C.	Trinity Western University
4	Edmonton Stingers	Somto Dimanochie	Kleinberg, Ontario	York University
5	Saskatchewan Rattlers	Anthony Tsegakele	Gatineau, Quebec	Brandon University
6	Vancouver Bandits	Diego Maffia	Victoria, B.C.	University of Victoria
7	Ottawa Blackjacks	Sukhman Sandhu	Surrey, B.C.	University of British Columbia
8	Niagara River Lions	Aiden Warnholtz	Ottawa, Ontario	Carleton University
9	Scarborough Shooting Stars	David Muenkat	Brampton, Ontario	STFX University
10	Brampton Honey Badgers	Najee Brown-Henderson	Windsor, Ontario	University of Windsor

=== Round 2 ===
Pick	Team	Player	Hometown	School team
11	Brampton Honey Badgers	Callum Baker-Magnaye	Oakville, Ontario	University of Toronto
12	Scarborough Shooting Stars	David Walker	Toronto, Ontario	Toronto Metropolitan University
13	Niagara River Lions	Jordan Tchuente	Ottawa, Ontario	Brock University
14	Ottawa Blackjacks	Guillaume Pepin	Montreal, Quebec	University of Ottawa
15	Vancouver Bandits	Brian Wallack	Surrey, B.C.	University of British Columbia
16	Saskatchewan Rattlers	Issac Simon	Regina, Saskatchewan	University of Alberta
17	Edmonton Stingers	Adam Paige	White Rock, B.C.	University of Alberta
18	Calgary Surge	Deon Ejim	Brampton, Ontario	STFX University
19	Montreal Alliance	Bahaide Haidara	Montreal, Quebec	Université du Québec à Montréal
20	Winnipeg Sea Bears	Tyler Sagl	Burlington, Ontario	Lakehead University
