= Teddy Allen (basketball) =

American basketball player (born 1998)

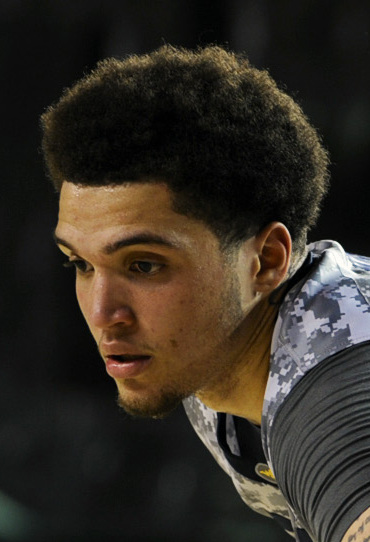
- Allen with West Virginia in 2017

No. 8 – Suke Lions
- Position: Guard
- League: NBL

Personal information
- Born: June 7, 1998 (age 28) Phoenix, Arizona, U.S.
- Listed height: 6 ft 6 in (1.98 m)
- Listed weight: 210 lb (95 kg)

Career information
- High school: Desert Ridge (Mesa, Arizona); Boys Town (Boys Town, Nebraska)
- College: West Virginia (2017–2018); Western Nebraska CC (2019–2020); Nebraska (2020–2021); New Mexico State (2021–2022)
- NBA draft: 2022: undrafted
- Playing career: 2022–present

Career history
- 2022: Scarborough Shooting Stars
- 2023: Wichita Sky Kings
- 2023: Winnipeg Sea Bears
- 2023–2024: Leicester Riders
- 2024: Winnipeg Sea Bears
- 2024: Saskatchewan Rattlers
- 2024–2025: Rio Grande Valley Vipers
- 2025: Tijuana Zonkeys
- 2025–2026: Rio Grande Valley Vipers
- 2026: Delaware Blue Coats
- 2026: Winnipeg Sea Bears
- 2026–present: Suke Lions

Career highlights
- CEBL champion (2026); CEBL Player of the Year (2023); 2× All-CEBL First Team (2023, 2026); All-CEBL Second Team (2024); CEBL scoring champion (2026); BBL Team of the Year (2024); BBL All-Star (2024); WAC Player of the Year (2022); WAC Newcomer of the Year (2022); First-team All-WAC (2022); WAC All-Newcomer team (2022); WAC tournament MVP (2022)

Teddy Allen (born June 7, 1998) is an American basketball player for the Suke Lions of the Chinese National Basketball League (NBL). He played college basketball for the New Mexico State Aggies, West Virginia, Western Nebraska Community College, and Nebraska Cornhuskers.

== Early life ==
Allen was born in Phoenix, Arizona and grew up in Mesa, Arizona. He grew up in a household with an abusive father until he was 11. Allen initially attended Desert Ridge High School, but was dismissed from the school after fighting with another student. After attending Canyon Valley School and Highland High School and struggling with his mental health, he went to Boys Town, a treatment and education facility for at-risk youth in Boys Town, Nebraska, at the recommendation of his stepfather. As a junior, he averaged 26.6 points and 12.4 rebounds per game and was named second team All-Nebraska. Early in his senior season Allen's mother, Elise died of cancer. He averaged 31.6 points and 13 rebounds per game and was named the Nebraska Gatorade Player of the Year as a senior.

== College career ==
Allen began his college career at West Virginia. He played in 35 games as a reserve and averaged seven points and 2.7 rebounds per game as a freshman. Following the end of the season, Allen announced that he would be leaving the program.

Allen transferred to Wichita State. He applied for a waiver to play immediately instead of sit out the season per NCAA transfer rules, but the waiver request was denied and he redshirted the season. Allen was dismissed from the team during the summer entering his redshirt sophomore season after being arrested for suspicion of domestic violence. Following his dismissal, he enrolled at Western Nebraska Community College. In his lone season with the Cougars, Allen averaged an NJCAA–leading 31.4 points per game with 3.7 assists and 7.4 rebounds over 28 games.

Allen committed to transfer to Nebraska in December 2019. As a redshirt junior, he led the Cornhuskers with 16.5 points per game and also averaged 4.7 rebounds, 1.7 assists, and 1.3 steals per game in 22 games played. On February 23, 2021, Allen scored 41 points, tied for the second most in school history and setting the record for the most points scored in Pinnacle Bank Arena, in a 86–83 loss to Penn State. Allen left the program in March before the end of the season.

Allen joined New Mexico State as a graduate transfer and was eligible to play immediately. He scored 41 points, the most points by a NMSU player in 20 years, in a 77–63 point win against Abilene Christian on January 15, 2022. Allen was named the Western Athletic Conference (WAC) Player of the Year in his first season with the team. He was named the MVP of the 2022 WAC men's basketball tournament after scoring 35 points over two games. Allen scored 37 points for the Aggies in a 70–63 upset win over fifth-seeded UConn in the 2022 NCAA tournament. Following the end of the season, Allen announced that he would be entering the 2022 NBA draft and hiring an agent.

== Professional career ==
Allen went unselected in the 2022 NBA Draft. He played in the 2022 NBA Summer League for the Denver Nuggets. Allen was signed by the Scarborough Shooting Stars of the Canadian Elite Basketball League (CEBL) for the remainder of the 2022 season. He finished the season averaging 11.6 points, five rebounds, two assists, and two steals per game.

Allen was signed by the Wichita Sky Kings of The Basketball League on November 30, 2022. He averaged 27.9 points, 9.3 rebounds, and 2.8 assists per game with the Sky Kings.

Allen returned to the CEBL and signed with the Winnipeg Sea Bears on May 4, 2023. He tied the CEBL record for points in a game after scoring 42 in a 98-93 win against the Scarborough Shooting Stars on June 2, 2023. Allen scored 40 points on June 15 in a 110-89 win over the Brampton Honey Badgers. He was named the CEBL Player of the Year and first team All-CEBL at the end of the season after finishing second in the league in scoring with 27.6 points per game and 8.0 rebounds per game.

Allen signed with the Leuven Bears of the BNXT League on November 17, 2023. However, he was released from the team without ever playing a game for them on December 4, 2023, due to administrative reasons that made him ineligible to play in the BNXT League. Allen was signed by the Leicester Riders of the British Basketball League (BBL) shortly after his release from Leuven on December 8, 2023. He scored 32 points coming off the bench in his first game with the team as the Riders beat the Caledonia Gladiators by a score of 96-90. Allen was voted a starter for the 2024 BBL All-Star Game after averaging 23.6 points, 6.3 rebounds, and 1.9 assists in his first 12 games with the team. He was named to the BBL Team of the Year at the end of the season after averaging 22.5 points and 6.7 rebounds per game.

Allen signed a contract on February 7, 2024, to return to the Winnipeg Sea Bears once the BBL season concludes. He was released by the Sea Bears on June 17, 2024, due to what head coach Mike Taylor described as selfish play and behavioral issues that were causing "internal unrest" within the team. Allen averaged 28.1 points per game over eight games prior to his release.

After his release, Allen signed with the Saskatchewan Rattlers on July 2, 2024.

On October 27, 2024, Allen signed with the Rio Grande Valley Vipers of the NBA G League.

On April 2, 2026, Allen signed with the Winnipeg Sea Bears of the Canadian Elite Basketball League. On July 19 of the same year, he broke the record for the most individual points in a singular CEBL game, scoring 54 against the Montreal Alliance. Prior to the start of the 2026 playoffs, Allen was hospitalized and ruled out of the playoff semi-final game vs the Saskatoon Mamba with what the team described as “significant health injuries” suffered after allegedly being assaulted by security staff at a downtown Winnipeg nightclub. Allen missed the entire playoffs with his injuries as the Seabears went on to win the CEBL championship. The three security guards who were involved in Allen's hospitalization were later arrested.

== Personal life ==
Allen has five brothers: Timmy Allen, Nick, Jaden, Jordan, and Jonah.
