= Trevon Scott =

American basketball player (born 1996)

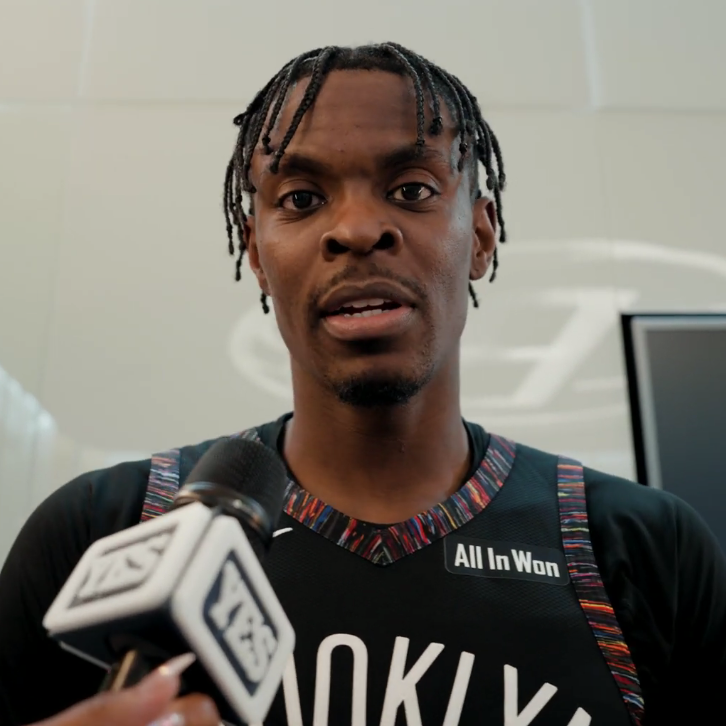
- Scott with the Brooklyn Nets in 2026

No. 13 – Bamberg Baskets
- Position: Small forward / power forward
- League: Basketball Bundesliga; Basketball Champions League

Personal information
- Born: November 25, 1996 (age 29) Brunswick, Georgia, U.S.
- Listed height: 6 ft 8 in (2.03 m)
- Listed weight: 225 lb (102 kg)

Career information
- High school: McIntosh County Academy (Darien, Georgia)
- College: Cincinnati (2016–2020)
- NBA draft: 2020: undrafted
- Playing career: 2020–present

Career history
- 2020: Leones de Ponce
- 2021: Salt Lake City Stars
- 2021: Cleveland Charge
- 2021: Cleveland Cavaliers
- 2021–2022: Cleveland Charge
- 2022: Agua Caliente Clippers
- 2022–2023: Fos Provence Basket
- 2023: Greensboro Swarm
- 2023: Calgary Surge
- 2023–2024: Greensboro Swarm
- 2024: Osceola Magic
- 2024–2025: Long Island Nets
- 2025: Winnipeg Sea Bears
- 2025–2026: Long Island Nets
- 2026: Brooklyn Nets
- 2026: Calgary Surge
- 2026: Winnipeg Sea Bears
- 2026–present: Bamberg Baskets

Career highlights
- CEBL Champion (2026); First-team All-AAC (2020); AAC Defensive Player of the Year (2020); AAC Most Improved Player (2020)
- Stats at NBA.com
- Stats at Basketball Reference

Trevon Scott (born November 25, 1996) is an American professional basketball player for the Bamberg Baskets of the German Basketball Bundesliga (BBL) and the Basketball Champions League. He played college basketball for the Cincinnati Bearcats.

== High school career ==
Scott played basketball for McIntosh County Academy in Darien, Georgia. His mother did not allow him to play sports unless he received at least a C grade on his progress report. As a senior, he averaged 21.6 points, 14.1 rebounds, 6.5 assists and 3.5 blocks per game, earning Georgia Region 2A Player of the Year honors for his second straight season. Scott left as his school's all-time leading scorer, with 1,824 career points. A three-star recruit, he committed to playing college basketball for Cincinnati over offers from Alabama, Clemson and Georgia, among others.

== College career ==
Scott redshirted his first year with Cincinnati. He was a reserve in his first two seasons, averaging 3.1 points and 3.6 rebounds as a sophomore while shooting 55.4 percent. Scott moved into a starting role as a junior with the departure of Gary Clark. Scott averaged 9.3 points and 6.9 rebounds per game during his junior season. On February 9, 2020, he recorded a career-high 25 points, 13 rebounds and four steals in a 72–71 overtime loss to UConn. Four days later, he scored 25 points again, while grabbing 19 rebounds, in a 92–86 overtime win over Memphis. On February 19, Scott posted 22 points and a career-high 21 rebounds in an 89–87 double-overtime loss to UCF. He became the first Cincinnati player to register a 20-point, 20-rebound game since Kenyon Martin in 1998. As a senior, Scott averaged 11.4 points, 10.5 rebounds, 2.2 assists and 1.5 steals per game, collecting First Team All-American Athletic Conference (AAC), Defensive Player of the Year and Most Improved Player honors. He became the first Cincinnati player since the 1982–83 season to average a double-double. Because the NCAA Tournament was cancelled due to the COVID-19 pandemic, Scott said the end of his collegiate career "will haunt me for the rest of my life."

== Professional career ==
=== Leones de Ponce (2020) ===
After going undrafted in the 2020 NBA draft, Scott signed with Leones de Ponce of the Puerto Rican Baloncesto Superior Nacional (BSN) on October 18, 2020.

=== Salt Lake City Stars (2021) ===
On December 16, 2020, Scott signed with the Utah Jazz of the NBA, but was waived prior to the season and assigned to their NBA G League affiliate, the Salt Lake City Stars. In his debut, he scored 15 points on 6-of-9 shooting and had six rebounds, two assists and one steal in the Stars' 117–98 loss to the Erie BayHawks. Scott averaged 10.1 points and 5.3 rebounds per game.

=== Cleveland Charge (2021) ===
In August 2021, Scott joined the Cleveland Cavaliers for the NBA Summer League and on September 8, he was signed by the Cavaliers. However, he was waived a week later. On October 23, he signed with the Cleveland Charge. In 10 games, he averaged 14.1 points, 6.0 rebounds, 2.4 assists and 1.3 steals in 34.4 minutes per contest for the Charge.

=== Cleveland Cavaliers (2021) ===
On December 22, 2021, Scott signed with the Cleveland Cavaliers on a 10-day contract via the NBA's hardship exception. He appeared in two NBA regular season games.

=== Return to Charge (2021–2022) ===
On December 31, 2021, Scott was reacquired and activated by the Cleveland Charge. He averaged 8.4 points, 5.4 rebounds, and 2.1 assists per game.

=== Agua Caliente Clippers (2022) ===
Scott was traded to the Agua Caliente Clippers on February 24, 2022, in exchange for the rights to James Palmer Jr., as part of a three-team trade involving the Memphis Hustle.

=== Fos Provence Basket (2022–2023) ===
On August 10, 2022, Scott signed with Fos Provence Basket of the LNB Pro A.

=== Greensboro Swarm (2023) ===
On February 27, 2023, Scott was acquired by the Greensboro Swarm.

=== Calgary Surge (2023) ===
On May 11, 2023, Scott signed with the Calgary Surge of the Canadian Elite Basketball League.

=== Return to Greensboro Swarm (2023–2024) ===
On September 5, 2023, Scott signed with the Charlotte Hornets, but was waived on September 29. On October 29, he re-signed with the Greensboro Swarm, the Hornets' NBA G League affiliate.

=== Osceola Magic (2024) ===
On March 6, 2024, Scott was traded to the Osceola Magic.

After joining them for the 2024 NBA Summer League, Scott signed with the Orlando Magic on September 11, 2024. However, he was waived nine days later and on October 27, he returned to Osceola.

=== Long Island Nets (2024–2025) ===
On December 26, 2024, Scott was traded to the Long Island Nets in exchange for Patrick Gardner.

=== Winnipeg Sea Bears (2025) ===
On July 8, 2025, Scott signed with the Winnipeg Sea Bears of the Canadian Elite Basketball League (CEBL).

=== Return to Long Island/ Brooklyn Nets (2025–2026) ===
On November 3, 2025, Scott returned to the Long Island Nets. On April 2, 2026, the Brooklyn Nets signed Scott to a 10-day contract. On April 12, Brooklyn re-signed Scott on a hardship contract.

=== Return to Calgary (2026) ===
On May 11, 2026, Scott signed with the Calgary Surge of the Canadian Elite Basketball League (CEBL), returning to the franchise for a second stint.

=== Return to Winnipeg (2026) ===
On May 30, 2026, Scott returned to the Winnipeg Sea Bears.

=== Bamberg Baskets (2026–present) ===
On July 14, 2026 he signed with Bamberg Baskets of the Basketball Bundesliga and Basketball Champions League.

== Career statistics ==
Legend
GP	Games played	GS	Games started	MPG	Minutes per game
FG%	Field goal percentage	3P%	3-point field goal percentage	FT%	Free throw percentage
RPG	Rebounds per game	APG	Assists per game	SPG	Steals per game
BPG	Blocks per game	PPG	Points per game	**Bold**	Career high

=== NBA ===
Year	Team	GP	GS	MPG	FG%	3P%	FT%	RPG	APG	SPG	BPG	PPG
2021–22	Cleveland	2	0	5.5	**.500**	.000	—	1.0	.0	.5	.5	3.0
2025–26	Brooklyn	**6**	**4**	**30.3**	.380	**.316**	**.667**	**5.2**	**1.7**	**1.3**	**.8**	**8.0**
Career		8	4	24.1	.393	.300	.667	4.1	1.3	1.1	.8	6.8

=== College ===
Year	Team	GP	GS	MPG	FG%	3P%	FT%	RPG	APG	SPG	BPG	PPG
2015–16	Cincinnati	Redshirt										
2016–17	Cincinnati	34	0	10.5	.500	**.333**	.500	2.6	.6	.5	.4	3.1
2017–18	Cincinnati	**36**	0	12.5	**.554**	.000	.596	3.6	.9	.4	.2	3.1
2018–19	Cincinnati	35	**35**	30.6	.472	.308	**.667**	6.9	1.5	.8	.5	9.3
2019–20	Cincinnati	30	30	**33.7**	.493	.288	.613	**10.5**	**2.2**	**1.5**	**.8**	**11.4**
Career		135	65	21.4	.492	.294	.616	5.7	1.3	.8	.5	6.6

== Personal life ==
Scott is the son of Anitra and Eddie Scott. His younger twin sisters, Jada and Jadyn, play college basketball for Cincinnati.
