= Jeremiah Tilmon =

American basketball player (born 1998)

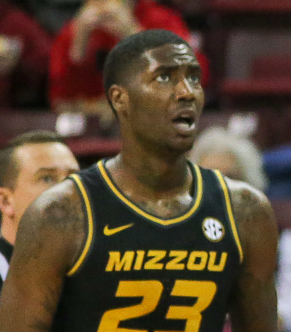
- Tilmon with the Missouri in 2019

No. 35 – Winnipeg Sea Bears
- Position: Center
- League: CEBL

Personal information
- Born: November 25, 1998 (age 27) East St. Louis, Illinois, U.S.
- Listed height: 6 ft 10 in (2.08 m)
- Listed weight: 260 lb (118 kg)

Career information
- High school: East St. Louis (East St. Louis, Illinois); La Lumiere School (La Porte, Indiana)
- College: Missouri (2017–2021)
- NBA draft: 2021: undrafted
- Playing career: 2021–present

Career history
- 2021–2022: Lakeland Magic
- 2022: Hamilton Honey Badgers
- 2022: CS Dinamo București
- 2022–2023: Raptors 905
- 2023: Brampton Honey Badgers
- 2023–2024: Greensboro Swarm
- 2024: Al Qadsia
- 2024: Metros de Santiago
- 2024: Suwon KT Sonicboom
- 2024–2025: Shenzhen Leopards
- 2025–2026: Wisconsin Herd
- 2026–present: Winnipeg Sea Bears

Career highlights
- 2x CEBL champion (2022, 2026); Second-team All-SEC (2021)
- Stats at Basketball Reference

Jeremiah Tilmon Jr. (born November 25, 1998) is an American professional basketball player for the Winnipeg Sea Bears of the Canadian Elite Basketball League (CEBL). He played college basketball for the Missouri Tigers.

== High school career ==
Tilmon played basketball for East St. Louis Senior High School in East St. Louis, Illinois. He transferred to La Lumiere School in La Porte, Indiana for his junior season, averaging 13.2 points and 8.2 rebounds per game for one of the best teams in the country. He dislocated his left shoulder at the High School Nationals title game and underwent surgery. He returned to East St. Louis for his senior season. He averaged 15.3 points, 11 rebounds and four blocks per game and was a First Team All-State selection. He originally committed to playing college basketball for Illinois but reopened his recruitment after coach John Groce was fired. Tilmon later committed to Missouri, choosing the Tigers over Kansas and North Carolina.

== College career ==
Before his freshman season at Missouri, Tilmon was arrested for a Minor in Possession. As a freshman, he averaged 8.2 points and 4.2 rebounds per game in a starting role. On December 18, 2018, Tilmon recorded a sophomore season-high 23 points and 10 rebounds in a 71–56 win over Xavier. As a sophomore, he averaged 10.1 points and 5.9 rebounds per game. Tilmon declared for the 2019 NBA draft before withdrawing his name and returning to college. As a junior, he averaged 8.2 points and 4.4 rebounds per game and was limited to 17 games due to a foot injury. Tilmon declared for the 2020 NBA draft but returned to Missouri for his senior season. On January 30, 2021, he posted 33 points and 11 rebounds in a 102–98 overtime victory over TCU. As a senior, Tilmon averaged 12.4 points, 7.3 rebounds and 1.4 blocks per game. He was named to the Second Team All-SEC.

== Professional career ==
=== Lakeland Magic (2021–2022) ===
After going undrafted in the 2021 NBA draft, Tilmon joined the Orlando Magic for the 2021 NBA Summer League. On October 7, 2021, Tilmon signed with the Magic, but was waived five days later. On October 28, he joined the Lakeland Magic as an affiliate player and in 45 games, he averaged 9.7 points, 5.1 rebounds and 1.6 assists in 20.5 minutes.

=== Hamilton Honey Badgers (2022) ===
On May 3, 2022, Tilmon signed with the Hamilton Honey Badgers of the CEBL. On August 14, he won the franchise's first CEBL championship with the Honey Badgers.

=== Raptors 905 (2022–2023) ===
On December 28, 2022, Tilmon was traded to the Raptors 905. On January 25, 2023, Tilmon was acquired as a returning player.

=== Brampton Honey Badgers (2023) ===
On April 13, 2023, Tilmon signed with the Brampton Honey Badgers.

On June 23, 2023, Tilmon signed with the Kagoshima Rebnise of the B.League. On September 29, his contract was terminated.

=== Greensboro Swarm (2023–2024) ===
On October 29, 2023, Tilmon signed with the Greensboro Swarm.

=== Al Qadsia (2024) ===
On April 1, 2024, Tilmon signed with the Al Qadsia of the Kuwaiti Division I Basketball League.

=== Metros de Santiago (2024) ===
On June 19, 2024, Tilmon signed with the Metros de Santiago of the Liga Nacional de Baloncesto.

=== Suwon KT Sonicboom (2024) ===
On June 28, 2024, Tilmon signed with the Suwon KT Sonicboom of the Korean Basketball League. On November 18, he was replaced by Jordan Morgan.

=== Wisconsin Herd (2025–2026) ===
On November 7, 2025, Tilmon was named to the Wisconsin Herd opening night roster.

=== Winnipeg Sea Bears (2026–present) ===
On April 22, 2026, Tilmon signed with the Winnipeg Sea Bears of the Canadian Elite Basketball League (CEBL).

== Career statistics ==
Legend
GP	Games played	GS	Games started	MPG	Minutes per game
FG%	Field goal percentage	3P%	3-point field goal percentage	FT%	Free throw percentage
RPG	Rebounds per game	APG	Assists per game	SPG	Steals per game
BPG	Blocks per game	PPG	Points per game	**Bold**	Career high

=== College ===
Year	Team	GP	GS	MPG	FG%	3P%	FT%	RPG	APG	SPG	BPG	PPG
2017–18	Missouri	**33**	**33**	19.4	.564	–	.526	4.2	.5	.2	1.0	8.2
2018–19	Missouri	31	30	24.2	.545	.000	**.681**	5.9	.6	.5	.8	10.1
2019–20	Missouri	17	11	19.9	.589	**.333**	.627	4.4	.6	.3	1.2	8.2
2020–21	Missouri	24	23	**27.6**	**.614**	–	.526	**7.3**	**.9**	**.8**	**1.4**	**12.4**
Career		105	97	22.8	.574	.250	.580	5.4	.6	.5	1.1	9.7
