= CEBL playoffs =

Basketball championship

CEBL Playoffs
- First played: 2019
- Most recently played: 2026
- Most recent champions: Winnipeg Sea Bears (1)
- Most titles: Edmonton Stingers, Niagara River Lions (2)

The CEBL playoffs is the annual postseason tournament of the Canadian Elite Basketball League to determine the league champion.

The playoffs have undergone multiple changes, starting from four teams in 2019, six teams from 2020 to 2022, and eight teams since 2023. Until 2025, the semifinals and finals were played as part of Championship Weekend.

On January 15, 2026, the CEBL announced the introduction of a full in-market postseason and a best-of-three finals, beginning with the 2026 season.

== Results ==
=== Championship Weekend era ===
Year	Champion	Score	Runner-up	Semi-finalists	Host city	Finals MVP	Ref
2019	Saskatchewan Rattlers	94–83	Hamilton Honey Badgers	Edmonton Stingers (83–85 SSK); Niagara River Lions (103–104 HAM)	Saskatoon	Alex Campbell	
2020 (Note: As a result of the COVID-19 pandemic, the Championship Weekend was not held in Edmonton as originally planned. Instead, a single-site Summer Series tournament was held.)	Edmonton Stingers	90–73	Fraser Valley Bandits	Hamilton Honey Badgers (75–76 FRA); Ottawa Blackjacks (75–88 EDM)	St. Catharines	Xavier Moon	
2021	Edmonton Stingers	101–65	Niagara River Lions	Fraser Valley Bandits (84–82 NIA); Ottawa Blackjacks (87-94 EDM)	Edmonton	Xavier Moon	
2022	Hamilton Honey Badgers	90–88	Scarborough Shooting Stars	Niagara River Lions (93–81 SSS); Ottawa Blackjacks (76–72 HAM)	Ottawa	Christian Vital	
2023	Scarborough Shooting Stars	82–70	Calgary Surge	Niagara River Lions (74–71 SSS); Vancouver Bandits (77–75 CGY)	Langley	Isiaha Mike	
2024	Niagara River Lions	97–95	Vancouver Bandits	Calgary Surge (89–87 VAN); Montreal Alliance (78–75 NIA)	Montreal	Khalil Ahmad	
2025	Niagara River Lions	79–73	Calgary Surge	Scarborough Shooting Stars (93–91 NIA); Winnipeg Sea Bears (90–79 CGY)	Winnipeg	Khalil Ahmad	

=== In-market format era ===
Year	Champion	Score	Runner-up	Conference Champions	Finals MVP	Ref
2026	Winnipeg Sea Bears	98–84	Brampton Honey Badgers	West: Winnipeg Sea Bears; East: Brampton Honey Badgers	Xavier Moon	

=== Championship Weekend results by teams ===
Note: Statistics include the semi-finals and final of the 2020 Summer Series which was held in lieu of the Championship Weekend due to the COVID-19 pandemic.

**Bold**	Team won that year's Championship Weekend
Italics	Team hosted that year's Championship Weekend

Team	Championships	Runners-up	Semi-final losses	Total appearances	Year(s) of appearance
Brampton Honey Badgers	1	1	1	3	2019, 2020, **2022**
Calgary Surge	0	2	1	3	2023, 2024, 2025
Edmonton Stingers	2	0	1	3	2019, **2020**, **2021**
Montreal Alliance	0	0	1	1	2024
Niagara River Lions	2	1	3	6	2019, 2021, 2022, 2023, **2024**, **2025**
Ottawa Blackjacks	0	0	3	3	2020, 2021, 2022
Saskatoon Mamba	1	0	0	1	**2019**
Scarborough Shooting Stars	1	1	1	3	2022, **2023**, 2025
Vancouver Bandits	0	2	2	4	2020, 2021 2023, 2024
Winnipeg Sea Bears	1	0	1	1	2025

=== In-market playoff results by team ===
**Bold**	Team won that year's championship

Team	Championships	Runners-up	Conference championships	Total conference finals appearances	Year(s) of appearance
Brampton Honey Badgers	0	1	1	1	2026
Calgary Surge	0	0	0	0	
Edmonton Stingers	0	0	0	0	
Montreal Alliance	0	0	0	0	
Niagara River Lions	0	0	0	1	2026
Ottawa Blackjacks	0	0	0	0	
Saskatoon Mamba	0	0	0	0	
Scarborough Shooting Stars	0	0	0	0	
Vancouver Bandits	0	0	0	1	2026
Winnipeg Sea Bears	1	0	1	1	**2026**
