= Terry Henderson =

American basketball player (born 1994)

Free agent
- Position: Shooting guard

Personal information
- Born: March 21, 1994 (age 32) Raleigh, North Carolina, U.S.
- Listed height: 6 ft 5 in (1.96 m)
- Listed weight: 190 lb (86 kg)

Career information
- High school: Neuse Christian Academy (Raleigh, North Carolina)
- College: West Virginia (2012–2014); NC State (2015–2017)
- NBA draft: 2017: undrafted
- Playing career: 2017–present

Career history
- 2017–2018: Greensboro Swarm
- 2018–2019: Scagliera Verona
- 2020: Greensboro Swarm
- 2020–2021: GTK Gliwice
- 2021–2022: Benacquista Assicurazioni Latina
- 2023: Calgary Surge
- 2023–2024: GTK Gliwice
- 2024: Wellington Saints
- Stats at Basketball Reference

Terry Henderson Jr. (born March 21, 1994) is an American professional basketball player who last played for the Wellington Saints of the New Zealand National Basketball League (NZNBL). He played college basketball for West Virginia and NC State.

== College career ==
Henderson played two seasons for the West Virginia Mountaineers and averaged 8.0 points per game as a freshman. He increased those numbers to 11.7 points and 2.9 rebounds per game as a sophomore while making 17 starts. In 2014 he transferred to NC State, choosing the Wolfpack over Maryland and Richmond. After sitting out a redshirt year per NCAA regulations, he played seven minutes of their first match against William & Mary and broke the ligament of his right ankle, which left him out of competition for the rest of the season. Once recovered, in his only full season with the team he averaged 13.8 points and 3.1 rebounds per game and led N.C. State in 3-pointers (78). Henderson applied for a sixth year of eligibility but was denied by the NCAA in May 2017.

== Professional career ==
After going undrafted in the 2017 NBA draft, Henderson joined the Charlotte Hornets for the preseason. He subsequently joined the Greensboro Swarm of the NBA G League for the 2017–18 season. In 42 games, he made 22 starts and averaged 11.3 points, 3.8 rebounds, 2.0 assists and 1.0 steals in 27.5 minutes per game. He played for the Hornets in the 2018 NBA Summer League.

For the 2018–19 season, Henderson moved to Italy to play for Scagliera Verona. He appeared and started in 19 games with averages of 12.4 points, 2.9 rebounds and 1.4 assists in 27.8 minutes per game. His final game for Verona came on January 30, 2019.

On February 6, 2020, Henderson joined the Greensboro Swarm for the rest of the 2019–20 NBA G League season.

On July 14, 2020, Henderson signed with GTK Gliwice of the Polish Basketball League. In 30 games during the 2020–21 season, he averaged 14.0 points, 4.5 rebounds, 2.4 assists and 1.0 steals per game.

In August 2021, Henderson played for the Indiana Pacers in the NBA Summer League.

For the 2021–22 season, Henderson returned to Italy to play for Benacquista Assicurazioni Latina. In 29 games, he averaged 18.3 points, 5.1 rebounds, 2.7 assists and 1.3 steals per game.

On July 5, 2023, Henderson signed with the Calgary Surge of the Canadian Elite Basketball League. In nine games during the 2023 season, he averaged 7.0 points, 3.9 rebounds and 1.1 steals per game.

On August 2, 2023, Henderson signed with GTK Gliwice in Poland for a second stint. In 29 games, he averaged 11.1 points, 3.6 rebounds, 1.9 assists and 1.0 steals per game.

On June 15, 2024, Henderson signed with the Wellington Saints for the rest of the 2024 New Zealand NBL season.
