= 2023 CEBL season =

- League: Canadian Elite Basketball League
- Sport: Basketball
- Duration: Season: May 24 – July 31; Play-in games: August 4, 2023; Playoffs: August 6–13
- Games: 20 per team
- Teams: 10
- TV partner: TSN

Draft
- Top draft pick: Simon Hildebrandt
- Picked by: Winnipeg Sea Bears

Regular season
- Top seed: Niagara River Lions
- Season MVP: Teddy Allen
- Top scorer: Justin Wright-Foreman

Championship weekend
- Venue: Langley Events Centre; Langley, B.C.
- Champions: Scarborough Shooting Stars (1st Title)
- Runners-up: Calgary Surge
- Finals MVP: Isiaha Mike

Seasons
- ← 2022 2024 →

The 2023 CEBL season was the fifth season of the Canadian Elite Basketball League (CEBL). It began on May 24, 2023, and the regular season ended on July 30, 2023. It was the inaugural season for the Calgary Surge and the Winnipeg Sea Bears. The Calgary Surge relocated from Guelph while Winnipeg was added as an expansion franchise.

This year was the first season where the league was divided in two conferences. The top four teams in each conference qualified for the playoffs; had the Vancouver Bandits finished in fifth place in the Western Conference, the fourth-place team would have been eliminated instead; as hosts, the Bandits automatically qualify for the semi-finals as a de facto first-place team, along with the first-place team from the Eastern Conference. The playoffs commence with the third- and fourth-placed teams in play-in matches, with the winners facing their own conference's second-place teams in the quarterfinals. The quarterfinal winners will then face their respective division semi-final opponent.

On March 16, 2023, CEBL announced a television deal with TSN: TSN will televise weekly games and broadcast the rest of the games online, and they will also televise the championship weekend.

== Teams ==
2023 Canadian Elite Basketball League
Eastern Conference
Team	City	Arena	Capacity
Brampton Honey Badgers	Brampton, Ontario	CAA Centre	5,000
Montreal Alliance	Montreal, Quebec	Verdun Auditorium	4,100
Niagara River Lions	St. Catharines, Ontario	Meridian Centre	4,030
Ottawa BlackJacks	Ottawa, Ontario	TD Place Arena	9,500
Scarborough Shooting Stars	Toronto, Ontario	Toronto Pan Am Sports Centre	2,000
Western Conference
Calgary Surge	Calgary, Alberta	WinSport Event Centre	4,000
Edmonton Stingers	Edmonton, Alberta	Edmonton Expo Centre	4,000
Saskatchewan Rattlers	Saskatoon, Saskatchewan	SaskTel Centre	15,100
Vancouver Bandits	Langley, British Columbia	Langley Events Centre	5,276
Winnipeg Sea Bears	Winnipeg, Manitoba	Canada Life Centre	15,321

=== Map of teams ===
Eastern Conference Western Conference

== Regular season ==
=== Standings ===
==== Western Conference ====
Pos	Team	Pld	W	L	PF	PA	PD	PCT	Qualification
1	Calgary Surge	20	12	8	1648	1631	+17	.600	Advance to quarter-finals
2	Winnipeg Sea Bears	20	12	8	1812	1802	+10	.600	Advance to play in games
3	Edmonton Stingers	20	9	11	1737	1661	+76	.450	Advance to play in games
4	Vancouver Bandits (H)	20	8	12	1707	1792	−85	.400	Advance to championship weekend (Note: Automatically qualified for championship weekend as the host team.)
5	Saskatchewan Rattlers	20	8	12	1688	1745	−57	.400	

Source: CEBL
(H) Hosts

==== Eastern Conference ====
Pos	Team	Pld	W	L	PF	PA	PD	PCT	Qualification
1	Niagara River Lions	20	13	7	1833	1714	+119	.650	Advance to championship weekend
2	Ottawa BlackJacks	20	12	8	1767	1719	+48	.600	Advance to quarter-finals
3	Scarborough Shooting Stars (C)	20	11	9	1731	1726	+5	.550	Advance to play in games
4	Brampton Honey Badgers	20	8	12	1698	1719	−21	.400	Advance to play in games
5	Montreal Alliance	20	7	13	1640	1752	−112	.350	

Source: CEBL
(C) Champions

=== Results ===
Teams	BHB	CGY	EDM	MON	NIA	OTT	SSK	SSS	VAN	WPG	BHB	CGY	EDM	MON	NIA	OTT	SSK	SSS	VAN	WPG
Brampton Honey Badgers	—	93–80	77–103	89–65	84–101	82–88		78–80	98–74	75–71	—				72–82			103–86		
Calgary Surge		—	74–70	75–83	85–82	86–79	79–64	65–79	77–82	97–81		—	85–67							96–82
Edmonton Stingers		81–82	—	92–68	99–94	85–91	79–74	89–91	92–78	95–99		91–83	—				85–86			
Montreal Alliance	82–94	74–77	93–88	—	84–69	97–76	79–88	72–104		89–85	69–89			—				80–83		
Niagara River Lions	87–79	99–86		100–93	—	87–101	116–74	99–81	87–78					98–91	—	99–82		98–89		
Ottawa BlackJacks	95–93			89–75	82–93	—	97–86	93–82	89–90	99–86	79–60			83–86	87–89	—				
Saskatchewan Rattlers	86–84	63–80	70–89		75–90	88–89	—	79–65	109–85	93–96		89–92					—		103–82	
Scarborough Shooting Stars	93–73		88–83	103–93	90–84	85–83	84–96	—	79–82	93–98	97–90					79–88		—		
Vancouver Bandits	91–96	84–81	90–80	74–79		93–97	92–89		—	103–106		88–93	84–74						—	79–90
Winnipeg Sea Bears	110–89	100–75	68–97	96–88	93–90		86–78		90–85	—			86–98				96–99		93–84	—

Source: https://www.cebl.ca/result2fiba
Legend: Blue = left column team win; Red = top row team win.

=== Attendance ===
As of August 1, 2023 (Note: The following teams did not report attendances: Edmonton on May 28; Saskatchewan for all games except May 31; Vancouver on June 6, June 17, June 25, July 1, July 9)

Pos	Team	Total	High	Low	Average	Change
1	Winnipeg Sea Bears (Note: Attendance for June 23 was recorded incorrectly.)	54,846	8,230	3,504	5,484	n/a
2	Edmonton Stingers	34,736	3,996	3,500	3,859	+100.8%
3	Niagara River Lions	31,063	3,971	2,448	3,106	+36.6%
4	Calgary Surge	29,797	4,116	2,324	2,979	+101.0%^{(Note: As the Guelph Nighthawks.)}
5	Montreal Alliance	28,795	3,500	2,307	2,879	−1.7%
6	Saskatchewan Rattlers	1,958	1,958		1,958	n/a
7	Ottawa BlackJacks	19,240	2,553	1,366	1,924	+5.9%
8	Vancouver Bandits (Note: Attendance for July 14 was recorded incorrectly.)	8,566	4,566	1,000	1,713	n/a
9	Brampton Honey Badgers	15,736	3,451	618	1,573	−13.1%^{(Note: As the Hamilton Honey Badgers.)}
10	Scarborough Shooting Stars	15,157	1,665	1,025	1,515	−7.1%
	League total	238,869	8,230	618	2,843	+55.9%

== Playoffs ==
=== Bracket ===
Play-in round August 4
E3	Scarborough	98
E4	Brampton	74
W2	Winnipeg	81
W3	Edmonton	87

Quarterfinals; August 6
E2	Ottawa	72
E3	Scarborough	77
W1	Calgary	84
W3	Edmonton	68

Semifinals; August 11
E1	Niagara	71
E3	Scarborough	74
W1	Calgary	77
W4	Vancouver	75

Championship; August 13
E3	Scarborough	82
W1	Calgary	70

=== Play-in games ===
Note: all times are local

TSN5

August 4
7:00pm

recap

Scarborough Shooting Stars 98, Brampton Honey Badgers 74
Scoring by quarter: 18–19, 27–17, 25–22, 28–16
Pts: Cat Barber 32; Rebs: Isiaha Mike 9 Asts: Kalif Young 10	Pts: Callum Baker, Shamiel Stevens 16; Rebs: Zane Waterman 10; Asts: Callum Baker 4

Toronto Pan Am Sports Centre, Scarborough, Ontario
Attendance: 1654
Referees: Tony Turnbull, Chris Bucella, Farhan Baig

TSN5

August 4
8:00pm

recap

Winnipeg Sea Bears 81, Edmonton Stingers 87
Scoring by quarter: 23–23, 18–22, 24–21, 16–21
Pts: Teddy Allen 35; Rebs: Simon Hildebrandt 11; Asts: Teddy Allen 5	Pts: Isiah Osborne 24; Rebs: Nick Hornsby 14; Asts: Brody Clarke 6

Canada Life Centre, Winnipeg, Manitoba
Attendance: 10580
Referees: Michael Weiland, Ryley Kerrison, Frank Rizzuti

=== Quarterfinals ===
TSN4

August 6
7:00pm

recap

Ottawa BlackJacks 72, Scarborough Shooting Stars 77
Scoring by quarter: 14–15, 23–15, 25–20, 10–27
Pts: Jakeenan Gant 21; Rebs: Zena Edosomwan 8 Asts: Matthew Coleman III, Kadre Gray 5	Pts: Isiaha Mike 24; Rebs: Isiaha Mike 13; Asts: Myck Kabongo, Kassius Robertson 4

TD Place Arena, Ottawa, Ontario
Attendance: 2519
Referees: Max Audette, David Maxin, Greg Spagnoli

TSN4

August 6
7:00pm

recap

Calgary Surge 84, Edmonton Stingers 68
Scoring by quarter: 21–13, 27–16, 12–21, 24–18
Pts: Stefan Smith 21; Rebs: Sean Miller-Moore 12; Asts: Stefan Smith 7	Pts: Brody Clarke 19; Rebs: Brody Clarke 10; Asts: Munis Tutu 5

Winsport Arena, Calgary, Alberta
Attendance: 3089
Referees: Reed Scott, Neil Donnelly, Mitch Strom

== Championship Weekend ==
=== Semifinals ===
TSN4

August 11
5:00pm

recap

Niagara River Lions 71, Scarborough Shooting Stars 74
Scoring by quarter: 20–14, 12–21, 15–18, 24–21
Pts: Jahvon Henry-Blair 20; Rebs: TJ Lall 8 Asts: Khalil Ahmad 5	Pts: Cat Barber 15; Rebs: Kalif Young 11; Asts: Kyree Walker 7

Langley Events Centre, Langley, B.C.
Attendance: 1,000
Referees: Michael Weiland, Reed Scott, Ryley Kerrison

TSN4

August 11
7:30pm

recap

Calgary Surge 77, Vancouver Bandits 75
Scoring by quarter: 22–15, 16–18, 13–20, 26–22
Pts: Stefan Smith 25; Rebs: Jordy Tshimanga 10; Asts: Sean Miller-Moore 4	Pts: Nick Ward 21; Rebs: Giorgi Bezhanishvili 8 Asts: Doug Herring Jr. 8

Langley Events Centre, Langley, B.C.
Attendance: 5,000
Referees: Tony Turnbull, Jayson Stiell, Max Audette

=== Championship ===
TSN3

August 13
4:00pm

Calgary Surge 70, Scarborough Shooting Stars 82
Scoring by quarter: 19–16, 13–25, 19-19, 19–22
Pts: Jordy Tshimanga 15; Rebs: Jordy Tshimanga 15; Asts: Stefan Smith 5	Pts: Cat Barber 23; Rebs: Isiaha Mike 9 Asts: Isiaha Mike 7

Langley Events Centre, Langley, B.C.
Attendance: 5,000
Referees: Tony Turnbull, Michael Weiland, Max Audette

== Awards ==
- Most Valuable Player: Teddy Allen, Winnipeg Sea Bears
- Canadian Player of the Year: Kadre Gray, Ottawa BlackJacks
- U SPORTS Player of the Year: Simon Hildebrandt, Winnipeg Sea Bears
- Defensive Player of the Year: Khalil Ahmad, Niagara River Lions
- Clutch Player of the Year: Khalil Ahmad, Niagara River Lions
- Coach of the Year: Mike Taylor, Winnipeg Sea Bears
- Sixth Man of the Year: Jelani Watson-Gayle, Winnipeg Sea Bears
- CEBL Finals MVP: Isiaha Mike, Scarborough Shooting Stars

=== All-CEBL teams ===
First Team		Pos.		Second Team	
Player	Team	Pos.		Player	Team
Simisola Shittu	Calgary Surge	F		Deng Adel	Ottawa BlackJacks
Teddy Allen	Winnipeg Sea Bears	G		Kadre Gray	Ottawa BlackJacks
Justin Wright-Foreman	Saskatchewan Rattlers	G		Christian Vital	Brampton Honey Badgers
Cat Barber	Scarborough Shooting Stars	G		Ahmed Hill	Montreal Alliance
Khalil Ahmad	Niagara River Lions	G	F	E. J. Anosike	Winnipeg Sea Bears

=== All-Canadian team ===
Pos.	Player	Team
F	Simisola Shittu	Calgary Surge
F	Thomas Kennedy	Scarborough Shooting Stars
F	Jackson Rowe	Ottawa BlackJacks
G	Kadre Gray	Ottawa BlackJacks
G	Sean Miller-Moore	Calgary Surge

=== Individual statistic leaders ===
Category	Player	Team(s)	Statistic
Points per game	Justin Wright-Foreman	Saskatchewan Rattlers	29.2
Rebounds per game	Simisola Shittu	Calgary Surge	10.6
Assists per game	Kadre Gray	Ottawa BlackJacks	6.3
Steals per game	Khalil Ahmad	Niagara River Lions	2.4
Blocks per game	EJ Onu	Niagara River Lions	2.0
FG%	Nick Ward	Vancouver Bandits	61.9%
3P%	Jelani Watson-Gayle	Winnipeg Sea Bears	49.0%

== CEBL Clash ==
The first CEBL Clash is a "showcase game featuring 20 players from around the league", scheduled to be played on August 26, 2023, at Videotron Centre in Quebec City, Quebec. Head coaches were announced on August 15, followed by rosters on August 18. Each team is represented by at least one player, with the nearby Montreal Alliance having a Clash-leading four players on Team East. Team West ended winning the Clash 107–102.

Team West
No	Player	Team
0	Sean Miller-Moore	Calgary Surge
4	Cody John	Brampton Honey Badgers
6	Alex Campbell	Vancouver Bandits
11	Terry Henderson Jr.	Calgary Surge
13	Marlon Johnson Jr.	Vancouver Bandits
15	Malik Benlevi	Saskatchewan Rattlers
16	Meshack Lufile	Edmonton Stingers
21	Chad Posthumus	Winnipeg Sea Bears
30	AJ Hess	Winnipeg Sea Bears
32	Jordy Tshimanga	Calgary Surge
Head coach: Nelson Terroba (Calgary Surge)

Team East
No	Player	Team
0	Jahvon Blair	Niagara River Lions
8	Nathan Cayo	Montreal Alliance
9	Ahmed Hill	Montreal Alliance
14	Maxime Boursiquot	Ottawa BlackJacks
16	Kyree Walker	Scarborough Shooting Stars
21	Elijah Ifejeh	Montreal Alliance
23	Alain Louis	Montreal Alliance
30	Jackson Rowe	Ottawa BlackJacks
32	Elijah Lufile	Scarborough Shooting Stars
54	Prince Oduro	Brampton Honey Badgers
Head coach: Chris Exilus (Scarborough Shooting Stars)
