= Saskatoon Mamba =

Canadian professional basketball team

- 2026 CEBL season
- Nickname: The Rattlers
- Leagues: CEBL
- Founded: 2018
- History: Saskatchewan Rattlers (2018–2025); Saskatoon Mamba (2026–present)
- Arena: SaskTel Centre; Merlis Belsher Place
- Capacity: 5,898 (lower bowl); 2,700
- Location: Saskatoon, Saskatchewan
- Team colours: Purple, black
- President: Vacant
- General manager: Vacant
- Head coach: Isaiah Fox
- Ownership: Jason Riberio & Usman Tahir Jutt
- Championships: 1 (2019)
- Website: therattlers.ca
Home	Away	Alternate

The Saskatoon Mamba is a Canadian professional basketball team based in Saskatoon, Saskatchewan. Formerly known as the Saskatchewan Rattlers, the team competes in the Canadian Elite Basketball League (CEBL), playing shared home games at the SaskTel Centre and Merlis Belsher Place. Saskatchewan hosted the CEBL's inaugural Championship Weekend in 2019, during which the team captured the league's first championship.

== History ==
In May 2018, the fledgling Canadian Elite Basketball League (CEBL) announced that Saskatoon would be home to one of six charter franchises when the league began play in 2019. This would bring professional basketball back to the province of Saskatchewan for the first time since 2001, when the Saskatchewan Hawks of the International Basketball Association folded. In July, 2018, the new team announced that it would be called the Saskatchewan Rattlers, named after the prairie rattlesnake. Lee Genier, who helped bring the Saskatchewan Rush to Saskatoon in 2016, was named team president. The team's first coach and general manager was Greg Jockims, a former coach of the Saskatchewan Huskies.

=== Early success ===
Ahead of their inaugural season, the Rattlers purchased a hardwood court from the Toronto Raptors and installed it at their home in the SaskTel Centre, along with shot clocks and net stands. Genier said the team purchased the floor due to its "storied history." The CEBL announced in May 2019, that the Rattlers would host the league's first Championship Weekend that August, which guaranteed the Rattlers a birth in the playoffs.

The Rattlers hosted the CEBL's first ever game on May 9, 2019. Negus Webster-Chan scored the first points for the Rattlers and the CEBL on a 4 point play (a made 3 point shot with a foul and the converted free-throw). However they lost the game to the Niagara River Lions by a score of 99–97, missing a last second three-point attempt to steal the win. Despite the initial setback, the first season was a successful one for the Rattlers, on and off the court. Saskatchewan led the league in season ticket sales and attendance. The team entered the Championship Weekend with a 11–9 record, good for 3rd place in the league. They beat the Edmonton Stingers in the semi-final, 85–83, and then the Hamilton Honey Badgers 94–83 in the final to capture the league's first championship. It was only the second professional basketball title for a team in Saskatchewan, after the Saskatoon Slam's National Basketball League title in 1993. Team captain Alex Campbell was named Most-Valuable-Player of the 2019 playoffs, while the championship final marked the final game of local Michael Linklater's career; the veteran, who had helped lead the Huskies to a national U Sports basketball title in 2010 alongside Jockims, announced his retirement after the game.

After the season, Jockims announced that he was stepping down from his roles as head coach and manager, but would stay with the organization as an advisor. In January 2020, the team hired Huskies coach Barry Rawlyk as its new general manager. Rawlyk then promoted assistant Chad Jacobson, with whom he had worked with the Huskies, to head coach.

=== Post-championship struggles ===
The CEBL's second season was heavily impacted by the COVID-19 pandemic. It was ultimately played as a 6-game round-robin tournament in St. Catharines, Ontario; the Rattlers finished in last place with a 1–5 record, eliminated from contention with a loss to the expansion Ottawa BlackJacks. The Rattlers were able to return to hosting games in Saskatoon during a shortened 14-game 2021 season. However, public health restrictions meant the team played without fans until 12 July, when a change in restrictions enabled a return of fans. The team continued to struggle on the court, again winning just once during the season and missing the playoffs for a second straight year. In the midst of the losing season, Jacobson resigned as coach, and the team named assistant Conor Dow the interim head coach.

In January 2022, the Rattlers signed veteran NBA assistant Dean Demopoulos as its new head coach. The team's play improved in the 2022 season, the league's first full season since 2019, as the Rattlers finished with a 11–9 record, securing home court for a playoff match-up with the two-time defending champion Stingers. Saskatchewan defeated Edmonton 94–91, led by 20 points from Tony Carr, to advance. The Rattlers were then eliminated by the Scarborough Shooting Stars in the quarter-finals despite a triple-double from Carr. Carr also finished the 2022 season with 110 assists which was the CEBL record at the time.

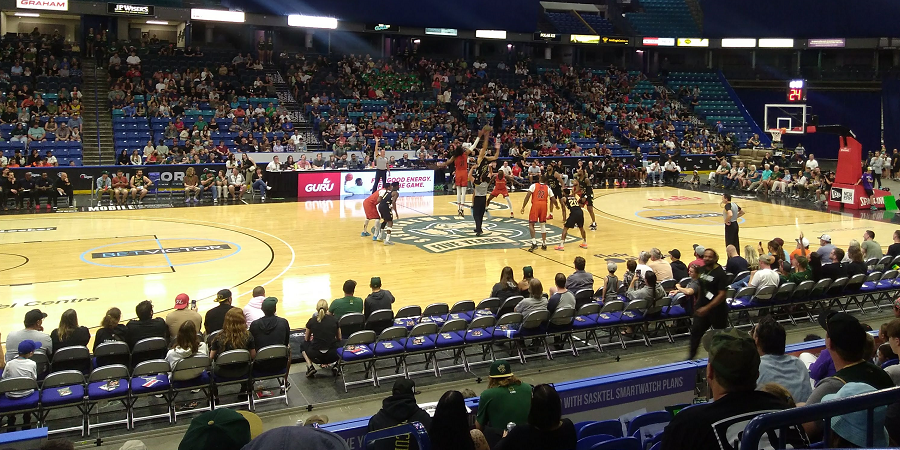
The Rattlers face the Vancouver Bandits at SaskTel Centre during the 2023 season

The Rattlers struggled through the first half of the 2023 season, and after losing seven games in a nine-game stretch, the team fired Demopoulos on 6 July. Assistant Tanner Massey took over the head coach position on an interim basis. The team had a 4–3 record under Massey, but were eliminated from playoff contention with a 92–89 loss in their final regular season game against the Calgary Surge. The main highlight of the 2023 season was the play of CEBL MVP runner up, Justin Wright-Foreman, who lead the CEBL in points per game at 29.2 which is still the current record for a single season (as of the end of 2026).

The team hired Larry Abney as its new coach for the 2024 season. The team got off to a 5–2 start, which featured a league record 45-point performance from Jalen Harris in a 104-93 win over the Hamilton Honey Badgers. However, the Rattlers finished the season winning only one of their final thirteen games to miss the playoffs for a second straight season. The team suffered major roster losses over this period as Harris went to play in China, while Elijah Harkless and Bryson Williams were both invited to NBA Summer League and did not return.

Rather than renewing Abney, the Rattlers promoted assistant coach Eric Magdanz to head coach for the 2025 season, in which the Rattlers again missed the playoffs with a record of 7–17. One of the highlights of the season however was the improved play of U sports draft pick Isaac Simon who first joined the team in 2023 as a 19 year old playing with the University of Alberta Golden Bears. Simon played in all 24 games in 2025 and played so well that he won the 2026 CEBL Developmental Player of the Year Award.

A memorable game in Rattlers history (the Linklater comeback) occurred on July 5, 2025 when the Rattlers played the Ottawa Blackjacks at home. The Rattlers and the Province of Saskatchewan declared July 5, 2025 to be Michael Linklater day as a celebration of his basketball accomplishments and contributions but also recognizing his community involvement particularly working with First Nations youth. The game was won by the Rattlers 93-90 in dramatic fashion as they came back to win after being down 82-71 at the start of target score time. The 11 point deficit, after which they outscored the Blackjacks 22-8, is the largest they have ever overcome in target score time. In that game Jordan Bowden scored 40 points on 9 of 14 shooting from 3 point range. Bowden's 9 made 3 pointers was a Rattlers single game record. The game winning shot was a 3 pointer by Grant Anticevich.

Another highlight was provided by Jaden Bediako on July 26, 2025 versus the Ottawa Blackjacks. In that game Bediako tied the CEBL record for most rebounds in a single game with 20 (bested in 2026 by Frank Mitchell of the Scarborough Shooting Stars who had 22), and had a CEBL personal best 23 points to help the Rattlers beat the Blackjacks 97-96. Bediako also set the CEBL single season record for blocks in 2025 with 49. Nate Pierre-Louis also had a stand out season in 2025 setting CEBL records for total assists (143) and assists per game (7.9).

=== Becoming the Mamba ===
Team president Lee Genier left the team in September 2025. In January 2026, the team announced that it would not renew the contract of GM Rawlyk, while also removing Rattlers branding from its website and social media platforms and calling itself the "Saskatchewan Professional Basketball Club (previously Saskatchewan Rattlers)". On February 4, the team announced new ownership consisting of Jason Ribeiro and Usman Tahir Jutt, and that its new name was the Saskatoon Mamba; the team also announced that it would split its regular season schedule between SaskTel Centre and Merlis Belsher Place. In March, the team named Isaiah Fox as its new head coach.

The first game as the Saskatoon Mamba was at home versus the Vancouver Bandits in the SaskTel Centre on May 19, 2026 at 10:30am. It was billed as the first annual "Be Well" school day game, so a large portion of the 2639 people in attendance were students bused to the game. The jump ball was tipped by Markus Harding directly to Dejuan Gordan who scored the first points in Mamba history on a lay-up in the first 6 seconds of the game. Gordan also had a game high 20 points but the Mamba lost 124-95.

The first win as the Mamba was a 100-98 point thriller over the Winnipeg Sea Bears on May 29, 2026 at the SaskTel Centre in front of a crowd of 1912 people. Target score time started with the Mamba leading 91-83 but Winnipeg scored 8 straight points to tie the game at 91-91. The teams then went back and forth before until Tavion Dunn-Martin made 2 free throws to get to the target score of 100 and seal the win.

The Mamba won their first game at Merlis Belsher Place against the Ottawa Blackjacks on June 15, 2026 before a crowd of 1,612. The game featured an epic comeback by the Mamba who were down 87-80 at the start of target score time before storming back to win 96-94 on a floater in the key by Trey Townsend The Mamba then repeated the feat on June 21, 2026 in Ottawa coming from down 92-85 at the start of target score time to win 101-98 on a 3 pointer by Tavian Dunn-Martin.

On July 3, 2026 the Mamba played the Calgary Surge in a neutral site game in Whitehorse, winning 96–92 at Takhini Arena. Jamir Chaplin had a game high 26 points. It was the first regular season professional basketball game played in Yukon or any of the Canadian territories.

The Mamba finished the 2026 regular season with a record of 13 wins and 11 losses for third place in the CEBL west division and a spot in the playoffs. The 13 wins in 2026 were a team high (prior to 2025 CEBL seasons played less than 24 games). The final regular season game was a 96-80 win against the Calgary Surge to complete a 4 game season sweep against their west division rival. The Mamba's newest 2026 addition Damari Monsanto had a team high 26 points and went 6 of 10 from 3 point range, while D'Andre Bernard a long time Saskatchewan Rattler and now Saskatoon Mamba player (5 seasons played starting in 2021) scored the target time winner with a 3 pointer (a perfect 3 of 3 for the game from 3pt range).

Tavion Dunn-Martin had a career year in 2026 with the Mamba setting CEBL records for total assists in a season (155) and total made 3 pointers (tied for 80 with Miles Powell). Trey Townsend had the leagues highest regular season 3 point percentage of 46.9% (for players with more than 60 attempts) which is good for fourth highest all time on the CEBL career regular season 3 point percentage list.

In the playoffs, the Mamba lost in the first round to the Winnipeg Sea Bears 99-88, ending their first season under the new identity.

== Roster ==
=== Current roster ===
Note: Flags indicate national team eligibility at FIBA-sanctioned events. Players may hold other non-FIBA nationalities not displayed.

Saskatoon Mamba roster
Players
Coaches

Pos.	No.	Nat.	Name	Ht.	Wt.	Age
G	10	(Canada)	Bandoo, Devonte	6 ft 3 in (1.91 m)		30 – 12 September 1996
C	15	(Canada)	Bediako, Jaden	6 ft 11 in (2.11 m)		26 – 24 September 2000
F	24	(United States)	Chaplin, Jamir	6 ft 5 in (1.96 m)		26 – 30 October 2000
G	7	(United States)	Dunn-Martin, Tavian	5 ft 8 in (1.73 m)		28 – 16 March 1998
F	33	(Canada)	Fuller, Jamal	6 ft 5 in (1.96 m)		25 – 21 September 2001
G	3	(United States)	Gordon, Dajuan	6 ft 4 in (1.93 m)		25 – 10 January 2001
C	22	(Canada)	Harding, Markus	6 ft 10 in (2.08 m)		25 – 21 November 2001
G	4	(Canada)	Mané, Karim	6 ft 3 in (1.91 m)		26 – 16 May 2000
F	2	(United States)	Williams, Jaylin	6 ft 8 in (2.03 m)		26 – 26 July 2000

Head coach

- (United States) Isaiah Fox

Legend

- (C) Team captain
- (P) Practice
- (U) Current U Sports Athlete
- Injured

- Roster
- Transactions
Updated: June 5, 2026

=== Notable players ===
- (Canada) Michael Linklater
- (United States) Tony Carr
- (United States) Nate Pierre-Louis
- (United States) Jalen Harris
- (United States) Justin Wright-Foreman
- (Canada) Devonté Bandoo

== Honours ==
CEBL Championships

Year	Winning Coach	W	L	Pct.
2019	Greg Jockims	11	9	.550

Individual Awards

CEBL Finals Most Valuable Player

Year	Player
2019	Alex Campbell

CEBL Developmental Player of the Year

Year	Player	University Team
2026	Easton Thimm	University of Saskatchewan Huskies

CEBL Community Ambassadors Award

Year	Player
2019	Jelane Pryce

All CEBL Teams

CEBL First Team

Year	Position	Player
2022	Guard	Tony Carr
2023	Guard	Justin Wright-Foreman

CEBL Second Team

Year	Position	Player
2019	Centre	Marlon Johnson
2019	Forward	Travion Dawson
2024	Guard	Teddy Allen
2024	Guard	Jalen Harris
2026	Guard	Tavian Dunn-Martin

== Season-by-season record ==
= Indicates League Championship

League	Season	Coach	Regular season				Postseason			
League	Season	Coach	Won	Lost	Win %	Finish	Won	Lost	Win %	Result
CEBL	2019	Greg Jockims	11	9	.550	3rd	2	0	1.000	Won CEBL Championship
CEBL	2020	Chad Jacobson	1	5	.167	7th	Did not qualify			
CEBL	2021	Chad Jacobson/Conner Dow	1	13	.071	7th	Did not qualify			
CEBL	2022	Dean Demopoulos	11	9	.550	5th	1	1	.500	Lost quarter-finals
CEBL	2023	Dean Demopoulos/Tanner Massey	8	12	.400	5th West	Did not qualify			
CEBL	2024	Larry Abney	6	14	.300	5th West	Did not qualify			
CEBL	2025	Eric Magdanz	7	17	.292	5th West	Did not qualify			
CEBL	2026	Isiah Fox	13	11	.542	3rd West	0	1	.000	lost quarterfinal
Totals			58	90	.392	—	3	2	.600	

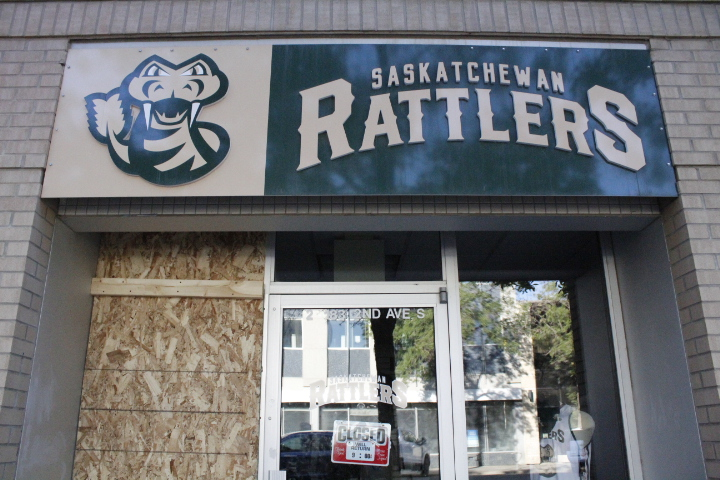
The Saskatchewan Rattlers office in downtown Saskatoon.

== Community involvement ==
In 2023, the Rattlers announced that they would be replacing the netting at basketball courts across Saskatoon throughout the summer.
