= Mike Taylor (basketball coach) =

American basketball coach (born 1972)

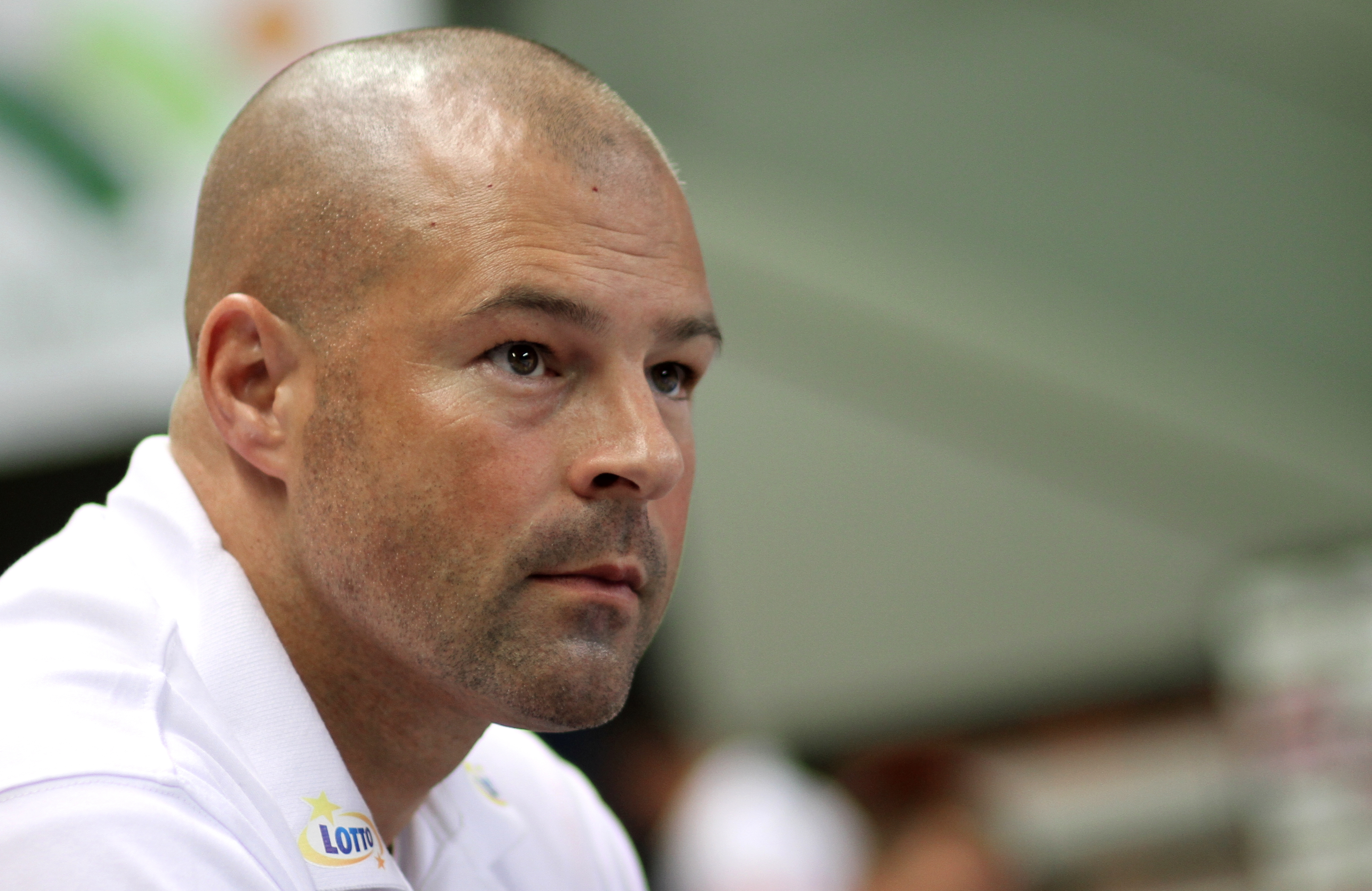
- Taylor in 2014

Florida Atlantic Owls men's basketball
- Position: Assistant coach

Personal information
- Born: August 29, 1972 (age 54) Williamsport, Pennsylvania, U.S.

Career information
- College: Indiana (Pennsylvania) (1991–1995)
- Coaching career: 1995–present

Career history

Coaching
- 1995–1997: Clarion (GA)
- 1997–2000: Indiana (PA) (assistant)
- 2000–2001: Pittsburg State (assistant)
- 2001–2002: BV Chemnitz 99
- 2002: Dodge City Legend (assistant)
- 2002–2003: Essex Leopards
- 2003–2011: Ratiopharm Ulm
- 2004, 2005: Kansas Cagerz
- 2010–2013: Czech Republic (assistant)
- 2011–2012: Rio Grande Valley Vipers (assistant)
- 2012–2014: Maine Red Claws
- 2014–2021: Poland
- 2018–2020: Hamburg Towers
- 2022: Fraser Valley Bandits
- 2022–2023: Brampton Honey Badgers (Associate)
- 2022–2025: Winnipeg Sea Bears
- 2026: Science City Jena
- 2026-present: Florida Atlantic

Career highlights
- CEBL Coach of the year (2023); ProA champion (2019)

Michael Richard Taylor (born August 29, 1972) is an American basketball coach who is currently an assistant coach of the Florida Atlantic Owls men's basketball team. He most recently served as head coach of Science City Jena of the Basketball Bundesliga and general manager of the Winnipeg Sea Bears of the Canadian Elite Basketball League (CEBL).

Previously, he was head coach of the Poland national team, which he led to the round of 16 at the 2015 EuroBasket and the quarter-finals of the 2019 FIBA World Cup.

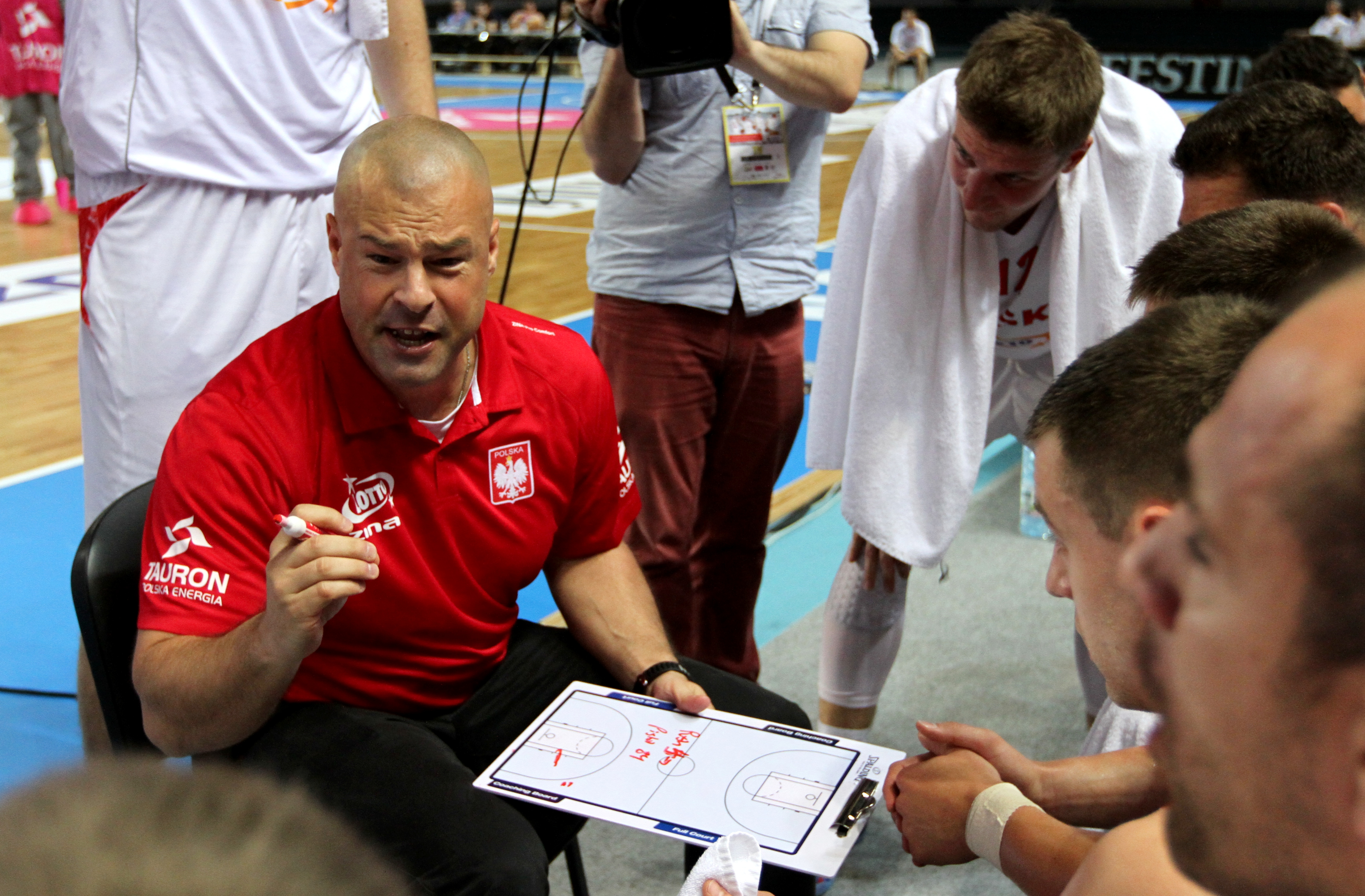
Taylor coaching Poland in 2014

Before he coached Poland, he led several professional teams in the United States and Germany.

== Coaching career ==
=== Hamburg Towers ===
On 23 May 2018, Taylor signed a two-year contract with Hamburg Towers of the German second tier ProA. In his first season, he won the championship with the club and led Hamburg to its first promotion to the Basketball Bundesliga (BBL).

=== Poland ===
In 2014, he became the head coach of the Polish national basketball team. He finished 11th at EuroBasket 2015 and 18th at EuroBasket 2017. His greatest success was finishing 8th at the 2019 World Cup, where he advanced with Poland for the first time since 1967 and then reached the quarterfinals.

== Personal life ==
Mike Taylor’s Dad, Dick Taylor is a former Clarion University Basketball coach and Professor.

In 2013 Taylor married his wife Alice, whom he met while coaching in Ulm, Germany. They have two sons.
