= Tyrell Vernon =

Canadian basketball coach and player

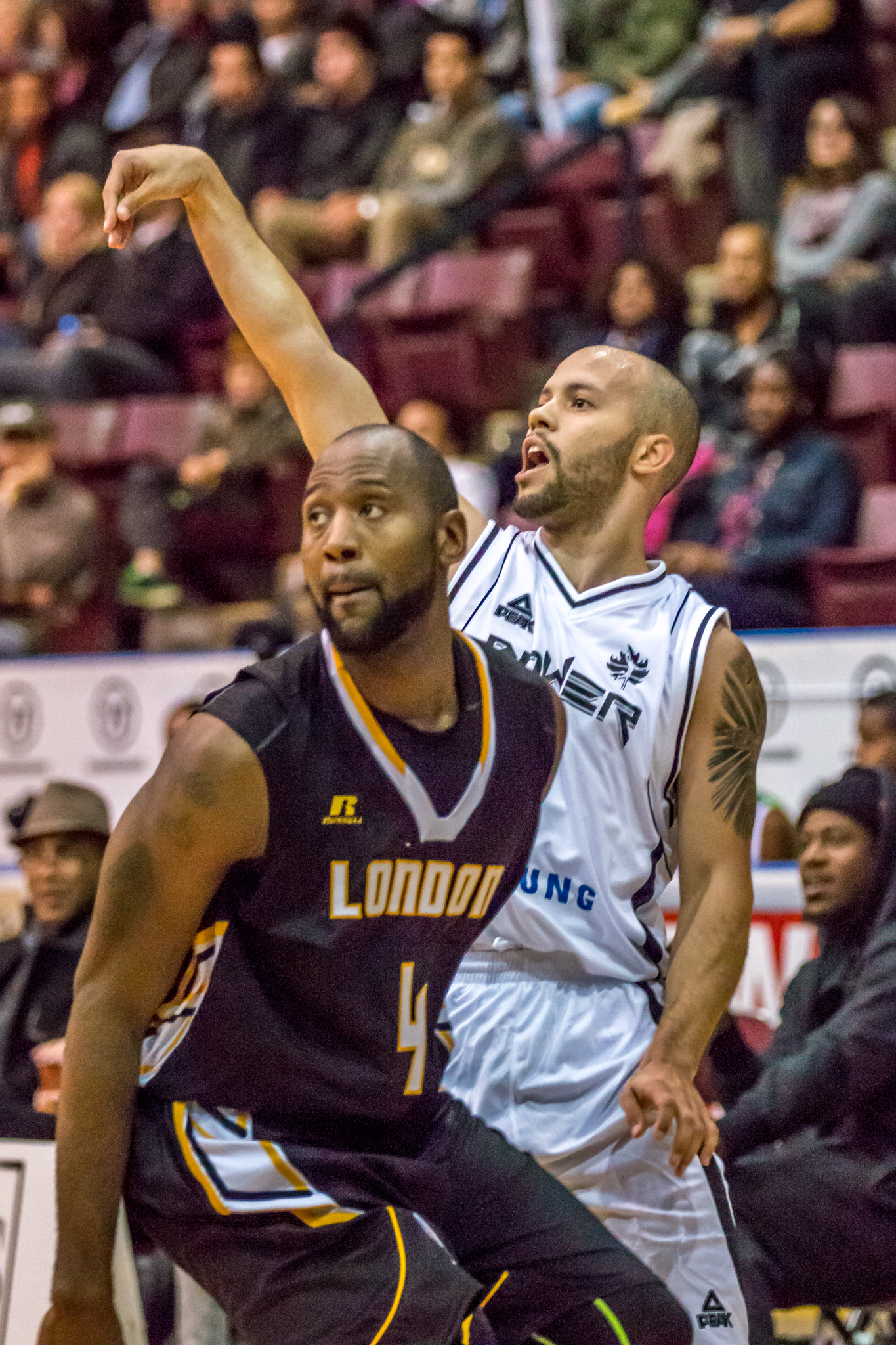
- Vernon (right) defended by Elvin Mims in 2015

Scarborough Shooting Stars
- Title: Head coach
- League: CEBL

Personal information
- Born: September 8, 1988 (age 38) Hamilton, Ontario
- Listed height: 6 ft 1 in (1.85 m)
- Listed weight: 190 lb (86 kg)

Career information
- High school: St. Thomas More (Hamilton, Ontario)
- College: McMaster (2008–2010); St. Francis Xavier (2011–2013)
- Playing career: 2014–2015
- Position: Point guard
- Coaching career: 2018–present

Career history

Playing
- 2014–2015: Mississauga Power

Coaching
- 2018, 2019: TRC Academy
- 2019–2021: St. Francis X-Men basketball (associate HC)
- 2022, 2023: Scarborough Shooting Stars (assistant)
- 2024: Calgary Surge
- 2021–present: St. Francis X-Men basketball
- 2026-present: Scarborough Shooting Stars

Career highlights
- As head coach: CEBL Coach of The Year (2026); CEBL champion (2023); OSBA champion (2018, 2019)

Tyrell Jordan Vernon (born September 8, 1988) is a Canadian professional basketball coach and former player who is the head coach for the St. Francis X-Men basketball of Atlantic University Sport & the Scarborough Shooting Stars of the CEBL.

He previously played for the Mississauga Power of the National Basketball League of Canada (NBLC). He played at the collegiate level with McMaster University and then St. Francis Xavier University and was one of the top passers and shooters in the Atlantic University Sport association while with the latter team. Vernon primarily played the point guard position and stands 6 ft 1 in (1.85 m).

== Professional career ==
On July 28, 2014, it was announced that the Mississauga Power had signed Vernon for their upcoming season. He said, "I'm very excited to be joining the Power." Vernon had grown up with the team's assistant coach, Jeremie Kayeye, and addressed the fact by saying, "We have a lot of respect for each other and I'm already very comfortable with the staff."

== Coaching career ==
Vernon started his coaching career by coaching the TRC academy boys basketball team in Brantford, Ontario, and led them to two OSBA championships in 2018 and 2019.

Vernon was also the 2019 OSBA Coach of the Year. He joined the St. Francis X-Men basketball in 2019 as an associate head coach before being promoted to head coach of the X-Men in 2021.

Vernon also served as an assistant coach of the Scarborough Shooting Stars in 2022 and 2023, winning the 2023 CEBL Championship.

On April 18, 2024, Vernon was hired as the head coach of the Calgary Surge of the CEBL.

On May 14, 2026, Vernon was announced as the new head coach of the Scarborough Shooting Stars of the CEBL. On May 16, 2026, Vernon earned his first win as Scarborough's head coach in the Shooting Stars' season-opening win over the Montreal Alliance 91-87.
