= Kadre Gray =

Canadian professional basketball player

No. 25 – Jiangsu Dragons
- Position: Point guard / shooting guard
- League: CBA

Personal information
- Born: November 2, 1997 (age 29) Toronto, Canada
- Listed height: 6 ft 1 in (1.85 m)
- Listed weight: 190 lb (86 kg)

Career information
- College: Laurentian University (2016–2020)
- NBA draft: 2020: undrafted
- Playing career: 2020–present

Career history
- 2021: Ottawa Blackjacks
- 2021–2022: Básquet Coruña
- 2022: Vancouver Bandits
- 2022: Ottawa Blackjacks
- 2022–2023: Bayer Giants Leverkusen
- 2023: Ottawa Blackjacks
- 2023–2024: GTK Gliwice
- 2024: Scarborough Shooting Stars
- 2024–2025: CS Vâlcea
- 2025–2026: Śląsk Wrocław
- 2026–present: Jiangsu Dragons

Career highlights
- Polish Supercup winner (2024); 2× First-team All-Big Sky (2016, 2017); Big Sky Freshman of the Year (2014); Big Sky tournament MVP (2016)

Kadre Gray (born November 2, 1997) is a Canadian professional basketball player for the Jiangsu Dragons of the Chinese Basketball Association (CBA).

== Early career ==
Originally from Toronto, Gray attended Woodbine Middle School, and then attended Oakwood Collegiate Institute, and then played basketball while attending Laurentian University.

== Professional career ==
He previously played for the Fraser Valley Bandits and Ottawa BlackJacks of the Canadian Elite Basketball League. With Ottawa, he was named all-CEBL second team and CEBL Canadian Player of the Year during the 2023 season after averaging 16.3 points and a league-best 6.3 assists per game.

== International career ==
Internationally, Gray has played for Team Canada at the 2022 FIBA AmeriCup, where the squad finished in fourth place. He averaged 9 points over 18.9 minutes during the tournament.
