= Isaiah Fox =

NBA G League assistant coach

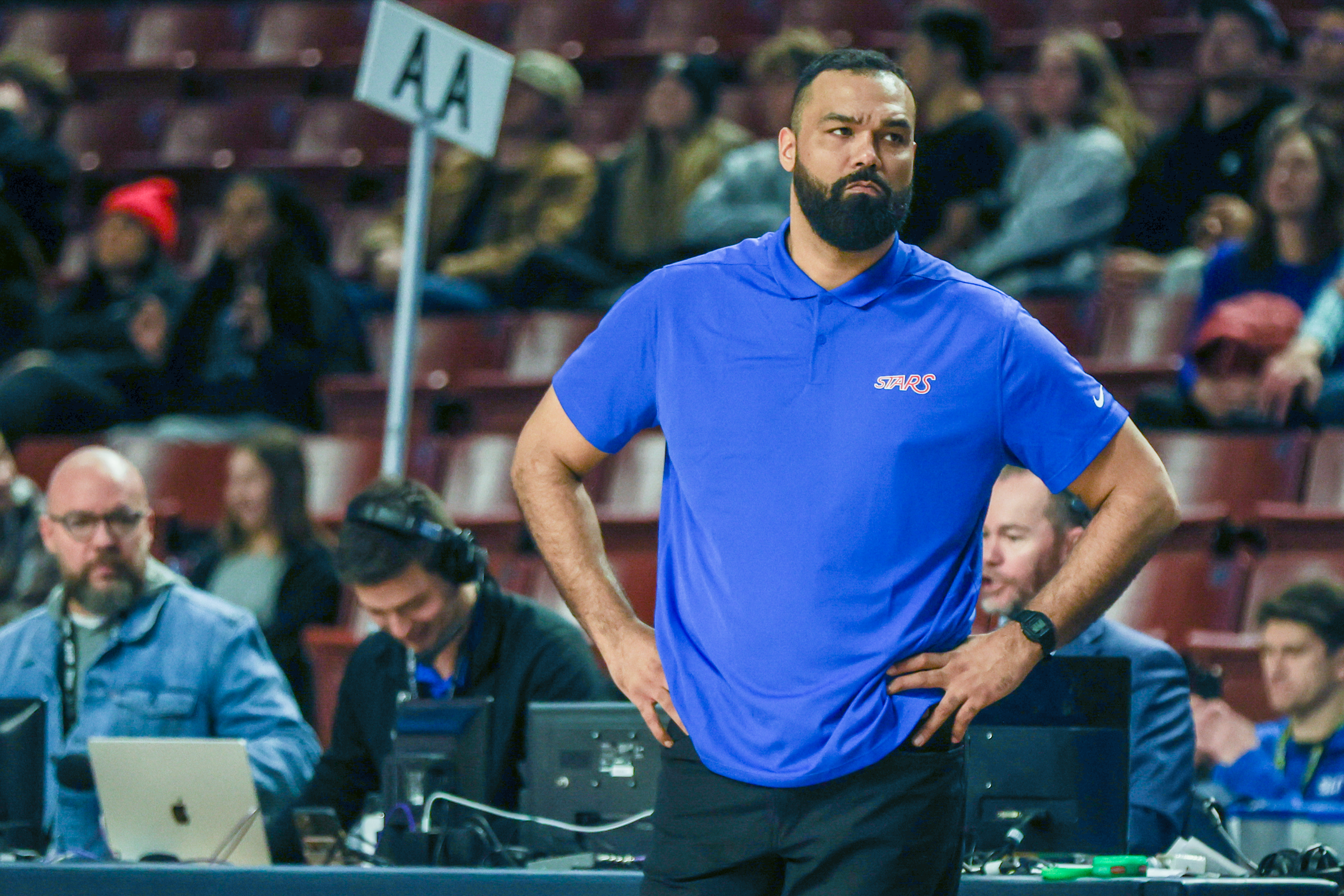

Saskatoon Mamba
- Title: Head coach
- League: CEBL

Personal information
- Born: March 29, 1983 (age 43) Tucson, Arizona, U.S.
- Listed height: 6 ft 9 in (2.06 m)
- Listed weight: 248 lb (112 kg)

Career information
- High school: Crossroads School (Santa Monica, California)
- College: Arizona (2001–2006)
- NBA draft: 2006: undrafted
- Position: Power forward
- Coaching career: 2012–present

Career history

Coaching
- 2016–2018: South Bay Lakers (Assistant Coach)
- 2018–2019: Los Angeles Lakers (Player Development Coach)
- 2019–2023: Philadelphia 76ers (Assistant Player Development Coach)
- 2019–2023: Delaware Blue Coats (Assistant Coach)
- 2023–2026: Utah Jazz (Associate Player Development Coach)
- 2023–2026: Salt Lake City Stars (Associate Head Coach)
- 2026–present: Saskatoon Mamba (Head Coach)

Isaiah Fox (born March 29, 1983) is an American professional basketball coach, currently serving as head coach for the Saskatoon Mamba of the Canadian Elite Basketball League (CEBL). Fox played college basketball at the University of Arizona, under head coach Lute Olson, and later played professionally overseas. In 2016, he joined the NBA G League coaching staff, as an assistant coach with the South Bay Lakers, an affiliate of the Los Angeles Lakers. His coaching career has included positions within the Salt Lake City Stars/Utah Jazz, Delaware Blue Coats/Philadelphia 76ers, and is a five-time NBA G League Champion.

A former McDonald’s All-America nominee, the 6-foot-9 Fox was a four-year letterwinner for the University of Arizona basketball team from 2002-06 under Olson. Fox was selected in the 2008 NBA G League Draft and his professional playing experience included stints in Australia, Mexico and Japan .

== Early Life and High School ==
Fox was born on March 29, 1983, in Tucson, Arizona, to Michelle Fox (née Kilgore) and Nils Fox, a former offensive lineman at the University of Arizona (1983–84). Fox was born on the same day that Lute Olson was hired as head coach of the Arizona Wildcats.

Fox attended Crossroads School for Arts & Sciences in Santa Monica, where he shared the court with several notable athletes, including NBA All-Star Baron Davis, a fellow Crossroads alumnus, and local friendly rival Tyson Chandler.

Fox was a McDonald’s All-American nominee and was named the 2001 John R. Wooden California High School Player of the Year.

== College Career ==
From 2001 to 2006, Fox played collegiate basketball for the Arizona Wildcats under Hall of Fame head coach Lute Olson. During his tenure, Fox was teammates with several future NBA players, including Luke Walton, Richard Jefferson, and Andre Iguodala; contributing to multiple NCAA Tournaments.

== Professional Playing Career ==
After going undrafted in the 2006 NBA Draft, Fox launched an international professional career that included playing for teams in China, Japan, and Australia. In 2011, Fox joined Pioneros de Los Mochis in Mexico’s CIBACOPA league.

== Coaching Career ==
Following his retirement from professional basketball, Fox transitioned into coaching. In 2016, he began his career with the South Bay Lakers, (renamed the Coachella Valley Lakers), where he served as an assistant coach and for one season as a player development coach with the Los Angeles Lakers.

In September 2019 Fox joined the Delaware Blue Coats, NBA G League Affiliate of the Philadelphia 76ers, as assistant coach to Connor Johnson and assistant player development coach for the Philadelphia 76ers. In 2021, Sixers announced new head coach, Coby Karl.

Fox helped lead the team to consecutive trips to the championship match. The Blue Coats won the 2021 Winter Showcase Championship, NBA G League Eastern Conference in 2021-22 and 2022-23, and was crowned NBA G League Showcase Cup champions in 2023

In April 2023 the Blue Coats claimed the NBA G League title after beating the Rio Grande Valley Vipers 114-110 in game two of the NBA G League Finals. The Blue Coats first NBA G League championship in franchise history.

In 2023 Fox joined Steve Wojciechowski's coaching staff as associate head coach for the Salt Lake City Stars, and associate player development coach for its affiliate the Utah Jazz. The SLC 2023-2024 season coaching staff included Bret Burchard, James Mays, and Jia Perkins

In the 2023-24 regular season SLC finished with a 20-14 record after winning 11 of their final 12 games (including 11 straight) to earn a spot in the G League Playoffs for the second straight season. SLC reached the third round of the 2024 G League Playoffs, the deepest postseason run in team history.

In the 2024-25 regular season, under head coach Rick Higgins, SLC finished with a 21-13 record and earned the franchise's first playoff win on April 1 against the Rio Grande Valley Vipers. SLC (1-1), fell to the Austin Spurs (1-0), 123-113, in the NBA G League Western Conference Semifinals ending the season.

The Stars were crowned 2025 Winter Showcase Champions following a dominant 137-112 victory over Raptors 905. The title marks the second Winter Showcase championship in franchise history, with the first coming during the inaugural tournament in 2019.

In 2026, Fox was selected as a head coach for the NBA G League Next Up Game during NBA All-Star Weekend in Los Angeles, coaching Team White.

On March 5, 2026, Fox was named head coach of the Saskatoon Mamba (formerly the Saskatchewan Rattlers) of the Canadian Elite Basketball League for the 2026 season. The appointment came ahead of the franchise's first season under the rebranded Mamba name.

In April 2026, Saskatoon announced that Greg Jockims, Rob Lovelace and Jamie Campbell would join Fox's coaching staff.

In his first season as head coach, Fox led Saskatoon to a 13–11 regular-season record and a showing in the 2026 CEBL playoffs, the franchise's first postseason appearance since 2022. Saskatoon advanced to the Western Conference semifinal, where it was defeated by the Winnipeg Sea Bears, 99–88.

== Awards and Honors ==
- NBA Summer League Champion - Los Angeles Lakers (2017); NBA G League All-Star as assistant coach with South Bay Lakers - (2017)
- NBA G League Winter Showcase Champion (2021), as an assistant coach with the Delaware Blue Coats
- NBA G League Eastern Conference Champion (2022 & 2023), as an assistant coach with the Delaware Blue Coats
- NBA G League Winter Showcase champion (2025), as a member of the Salt Lake City Stars coaching staff
- NBA G League Next Up Game head coach, Team White (2026)
- Crossroads Athletics Hall of Fame, Class of 2022
