= Winnipeg Sea Bears =

- 2026 CEBL season
- Leagues: CEBL
- Founded: 2022
- History: Winnipeg Sea Bears (2022–present)
- Arena: Canada Life Centre
- Capacity: 15,321
- Location: Winnipeg, Manitoba
- Team colours: Black, teal, white
- President: Rhéanne Marcoux
- General manager: Mike Raimbault
- Head coach: Mike Raimbault
- Ownership: David Asper
- Championships: 1 (2026)
- Conference titles: 1 (2026)
- Retired numbers: 1 (33)
- Website: seabears.ca

The Winnipeg Sea Bears are a Canadian professional basketball team based in Winnipeg, Manitoba, that competes in the Canadian Elite Basketball League (CEBL). They play their home games at the Canada Life Centre in Winnipeg.

== History ==
On November 9, 2022, the Canadian Elite Basketball League announced that its 10th franchise would be in Winnipeg, Manitoba.

On November 30, 2022, the Winnipeg franchise officially unveiled their branding, announcing their name and logo as the Winnipeg Sea Bears. It was announced they would be playing at the Canada Life Centre.

On December 14, 2022, the Sea Bears announced that Mike Taylor was hired as the team’s inaugural head coach.

On May 27, 2023, the Sea Bears played their inaugural game in front of 7,303 fans, shattering the previous league attendance record by nearly 3,000. They won the game 90–85 over the Vancouver Bandits. The Sea Bears finished their inaugural season with a 12–8 record for second in the Western Conference and a home playoff game against the Edmonton Stingers. Winnipeg set another attendance record for their first playoff game with 10,580 spectators.

Prior to the 2024 season the CEBL announced that Winnipeg would host the 2025 CEBL Championship Weekend. The Sea Bears' second season started May 22, 2024 with a loss to the Saskatchewan Rattlers, played in the SaskTel Centre in Saskatoon. They finished the season with a 9–11 record, qualifying for the playoffs. The Sea Bears would be eliminated in the play-in round by the Calgary Surge by a score of 84–82.

The Sea Bears retired their first jersey on May 16, 2025 during their opening night of the 2025 season. The jersey that was retired was #33, Chad Posthumus, to remember and honour his legacy on and off the court after he died.

In the 2025 season, the Sea Bears had an 11–13 record in the regular season. As the CEBL Championship Weekend hosts, the Sea Bears received an automatic berth into the semifinals, where they would once again lose to the Calgary Surge, 90–79. Head coach and GM Mike Taylor was let go following the defeat and was replaced by assistant coach Mike Raimbault on August 28, 2025.

In the 2026 season, the Sea Bears went 14–10 in the regular season and finished in 2nd in the West division. Despite losing three key players prior to the playoffs (Emmanuel Akot, Jeremiah Tilmon Jr, and Teddy Allen), the Sea Bears would win their first playoff game in franchise history, beating the Saskatoon Mamba, 99–88, in the West semi-final. In the West final, the Sea Bears went on the road to defeat the Vancouver Bandits, 107–96, to advance to the CEBL Finals against the Brampton Honey Badgers. After game 1 of the best-of-three was canceled due to unplayable court conditions in Brampton, the league reverted the finals to a single-elimination game. In front of a league-record 12,519 fans at Canada Life Centre, the Sea Bears defeated the Honey Badgers, 98–84, to win their first championship in franchise history. With the win, the Sea Bears became the first West division team to win the CEBL title since the Edmonton Stingers in 2021.

== Players ==
=== Current roster ===
Note: Flags indicate national team eligibility at FIBA-sanctioned events. Players may hold other non-FIBA nationalities not displayed.

Winnipeg Sea Bears roster
Players
Coaches

Pos.	No.	Nat.	Name	Ht.	Wt.	Age
G	1	(Canada)	Walker, David	6 ft 4 in (1.93 m)		27 – 28 September 1999
F	4	(United States)	Scott, Trevon	6 ft 8 in (2.03 m)		29 – 25 November 1996
G	5	(Canada)	Kraus, Mason	6 ft 3 in (1.91 m)		24 – 22 March 2002
G	7	(Canada)	Akot, Emmanuel	6 ft 8 in (2.03 m)		27 – 17 March 1999
G	8	(United States)	Allen, Teddy	6 ft 6 in (1.98 m)		28 – 7 June 1998
G	9	(United States)	McGowens, Trey	6 ft 3 in (1.91 m)		26 – 15 May 2000
G	11	(United States)	Chaney, Armani	5 ft 10 in (1.78 m)		29 – 26 April 1997
G	13	(Canada)	Bilamu, Nathan	6 ft 5 in (1.96 m)		26 – 7 August 2000
C	14	(Canada)	Filewich, Kyler	6 ft 9 in (2.06 m)		25 – 25 July 2001
F	15	(Canada)	Hildebrandt, Simon	6 ft 9 in (2.06 m)		23 – 17 March 2003
G	17	(United States)	Moon, Xavier	6 ft 2 in (1.88 m)		31 – 2 January 1995
G	23	(Canada)	Osborne, Isiah	6 ft 5 in (1.96 m)		29 – 10 December 1996
C	35	(United States)	Tilmon, Jeremiah	6 ft 10 in (2.08 m)		27 – 25 November 1998

Head coach

- (United States) Mike Taylor

Assistant coach(es)

- (Canada) Mike Raimbault
- (Canada) Ryan Thomson
- (Canada) Braeden Floyd
- (Canada) Tevonn Walker
- (United States) Nick Elam

Legend

- (C) Team captain
- (I) Inactive
- (U) Current U Sports Athlete
- Injured

- Roster
- Transactions
Updated: June 6, 2026

== Honours ==
- CEBL

Western Conference Champions (1): 2026
Champions (1): 2026

Retired Jerseys

Date	Player	Jersey No.
May 16, 2025	Chad Posthumus	#33

CEBL Most Valuable Player

Season	Player
2023	Teddy Allen

U Sports Player of the year

Season	Player	University Team
2023	Simon Hildebrandt	University of Manitoba Bisons

Developmental Player of the Year

Season	Player	University Team
2024	Simon Hildebrandt	University of Manitoba Bisons

CEBL Coach of the year

Season	Coach	W	L
2023	Mike Taylor	12	8

CEBL Sixth Man of the Year

Season	Player
2023	Jelani Watson-Gayle

All CEBL Teams

CEBL First team All Stars

Season	Player	Position
2023	Teddy Allen	Guard
2024	Justin Wright-Foreman	Guard
2026	Teddy Allen	Guard

CEBL Second Team All Stars

Season	Player	Position
2023	E.J. Anosike	Forward
2024	Teddy Allen (Note: Allen Played for the Sea Bears until June 17, 2024 when he was released. He later signed with the Saskatchewan Rattlers and the CEBL recognized him as a Second Team All Star selection from both Winnipeg and Saskatchewan.)	Guard
2025	Simi Shittu	Forward

CEBL BUSINESS AWARD WINNERS:

Franchise of the year

Season	Team
2023	Winnipeg Sea Bears

Team Executive of the year

Season	Name	Position
2023	Jason Smith	President
2024	Jason Smith	President

CEBL Mascot of the year award

Season	Mascot
2023	Churchill the Sea Bear
2024	Churchill the Sea Bear

== Season-by-season record ==
League	Season	Coach	Regular season				Postseason			
League	Season	Coach	Won	Lost	Win %	Finish	Won	Lost	Win %	Result
CEBL
CEBL	2023	Mike Taylor	12	8	.600	2nd West	0	1	.000	Lost play-in round
CEBL	2024	Mike Taylor	9	11	.450	4th West	0	1	.000	Lost play-in round
CEBL	2025	Mike Taylor	11	13	.458	4th West	0	1	.000	Lost Semifinal
CEBL	2026	Mike Raimbault	14	10	.583	2nd West	3	0	1.000	Won CEBL Championship
Totals			46	42	.523	—	3	3	.500	
