= 2026 CEBL season =

- League: Canadian Elite Basketball League
- Sport: Basketball
- Duration: Season: May 9 – August 3 Playoffs: August 6–15
- Games: 24 per team
- Teams: 10
- TV partner(s): CBC Sports YouTube, CBC TV, CBC Gem, CEBL+, CEBL YouTube, TSN, TSN+, RDS, RDS.ca

Regular season
- Top seed: Scarborough Shooting Stars
- Season MVP: Myles Powell
- Top scorer: Teddy Allen

Playoffs
- Eastern champions: Brampton Honey Badgers
- Eastern runners-up: Niagara River Lions
- Western champions: Winnipeg Sea Bears
- Western runners-up: Vancouver Bandits

Finals
- Champions: Winnipeg Sea Bears (1st title)
- Runners-up: Brampton Honey Badgers
- Finals MVP: Xavier Moon

Seasons
- ← 2025 2027

The 2026 CEBL season was the eighth season of the Canadian Elite Basketball League (CEBL). The regular season began on May 9 and ended on August 3.

On January 15, 2026, the CEBL announced the introduction of a full in-market postseason and a best-of-three finals, beginning with the 2026 season. The CEBL changed their playoff format disbanding the Championship Weekend to move to a regular playoff format with the top 4 teams in each conference making the playoffs. The first two rounds were single elimination format, with the finals originally due to be a best-of-three. Due to arena issues, the best-of-three series was changed back to a single-game final.

On February 19, 2026, Tyler Mazereeuw was promoted to President and CEO of the CEBL, replacing former commissioner Mike Morreale, who served since the league's inaugural season in 2019.

On February 4, 2026, the Saskatchewan Rattlers rebranded as the Saskatoon Mamba and announced that they will be playing at 2 venues: SaskTel Centre and Merlis Belsher Place.

The Vancouver Bandits played a neutral site home game against the Saskatoon Mamba at Prospera Place in Kelowna on June 6, 2026.

On March 3, 2026, the CEBL announced that the CBC would again be the leagues broadcast partner for 2026–2030. Select games would be shown on CBC TV, and all games would be carried on CBC Gem and CBC Sports YouTube.

In August 2026, the league announced a partnership with TSN and TSN+ to deliver coverage of the playoffs.

== Regular season ==
=== Standings ===
==== Western Conference ====
Pos	Team	Pld	W	L	PF	PA	PD	PCT	Qualification
1	Vancouver Bandits	24	15	9	2355	2243	+112	.625	Advance to conference semifinals
2	Winnipeg Sea Bears	24	14	10	2316	2161	+155	.583	Advance to conference semifinals
3	Saskatoon Mamba	24	13	11	2319	2336	−17	.542	Advance to conference semifinals
4	Edmonton Stingers	24	9	15	2242	2314	−72	.375	Advance to conference semifinals
5	Calgary Surge	24	8	16	2144	2256	−112	.333	

Source: CEBL
Rules for classification: 1) Wins; 2) Winning percentage between tied team; 3) Point difference between tied teams; 4) Point quotient between tied teams; 5) Point difference in all games; 6) Point quotient in all games; 7) Coin toss.

==== Eastern Conference ====
Pos	Team	Pld	W	L	PF	PA	PD	PCT	Qualification
1	Scarborough Shooting Stars	24	20	4	2304	2150	+154	.833	Advance to conference semifinals
2	Brampton Honey Badgers	24	11	13	2138	2213	−75	.458	Advance to conference semifinals
3	Ottawa BlackJacks	24	10	14	2233	2251	−18	.417 (Note: Record in games played between tied teams: Ottawa 5–3, Niagara 4–4, Montreal 3–5)	Advance to conference semifinals
4	Niagara River Lions	24	10	14	2092	2166	−74	.417	Advance to conference semifinals
5	Montreal Alliance	24	10	14	2095	2148	−53	.417	

Source: CEBL
Rules for classification: 1) Wins; 2) Winning percentage between tied team; 3) Point difference between tied teams; 4) Point quotient between tied teams; 5) Point difference in all games; 6) Point quotient in all games; 7) Coin toss.

=== Attendance ===
As of August 3, 2026

Pos	Team	Total	High	Low	Average	Change
1	Winnipeg Sea Bears	78,375	7,973	5,717	6,531	−14.9%
2	Vancouver Bandits	52,161	4,973	3,422	4,346	−1.9%
3	Edmonton Stingers	35,139	3,702	2,343	2,928	−0.5%
4	Calgary Surge	34,163	5,148	2,135	2,846	−15.2%
5	Montreal Alliance	29,237	3,445	1,850	2,436	−15.8%
6	Niagara River Lions	24,312	2,862	1,129	2,026	−15.4%
7	Scarborough Shooting Stars	23,064	2,637	1,216	1,922	+30.4%
8	Brampton Honey Badgers	21,058	2,737	807	1,754	+19.1%
9	Saskatoon Mamba	19,478	2,639	1,122	1,623	−29.5%
10	Ottawa BlackJacks	19,429	2,490	1,134	1,619	−18.6%
	League total	337,406	7,973	807	2,811	−9.1%

Source: CEBL

== Results ==
Teams	BHB	CGY	EDM	MON	NIA	OTT	SSK	SSS	VAN	WPG	BHB	CGY	EDM	MON	NIA	OTT	SSK	SSS	VAN	WPG
Brampton Honey Badgers	—	91–72	87–86	82–80	84–104	91–86		95–99	87–93	96–92	—			90–89	81–91	81–76		104–117		
Calgary Surge	102–99	—	98–104	88–93	81–76		88–94	104–106	95–80	88–107		—	101–88				99–116		93–86	93–85
Edmonton Stingers		96–87	—	76–95	99–101	89–96	105–103	78–95	91–78	75–77		100–89	—				97–107		94–112	98–100
Montreal Alliance	105–92		78–98	—	72–87	79–90	93–80	87–91	87–82	97–91	92–86			—	96–86	96–85		84–97		
Niagara River Lions	86–97	88–76	91–102	93–75	—	77–86	77–104	93–104	100–110		99–90			90–87	—	106–102		98–89		
Ottawa BlackJacks	90–93	93–88		87–96	91–85	—	98–101	88–86	114–105	88–117	98–105			104–77	92–69	—		106–113		
Saskatoon Mamba	98–92	96–92	108–115		94–83	96–94	—	90–88	95–124	100–98		96–80	96–94				—		85–92	83–96
Scarborough Shooting Stars	82–69	96–80	107–97	80–78	75–69	108–80	107–103	—		103–101	91–77			91–87	82–75	89–102		—		
Vancouver Bandits	102–81	111–101	111–88	93–92		104–95	105–85	105–108	—	94–88		84–92	93–94				104–97		—	114–90
Winnipeg Sea Bears	86–88	92–72	107–86	109–80	97–71	100–92	108–96		114–81	—		80–85	97–93				107–96		77–92	—

Source: CEBL
Legend: Blue = left column team win; Red = top row team win.

== Playoffs ==
Conference Semifinals
E1	Scarborough	84
E4	Niagara	86
Eastern Conference
E2	Brampton	95
E3	Ottawa	91
W1	Vancouver	92
W4	Edmonton	83
Western Conference
W2	Winnipeg	99
W3	Saskatoon	88

Conference Finals
E4	Niagara	81
E2	Brampton	91
W1	Vancouver	96
W2	Winnipeg	107

CEBL Finals
E2	Brampton	84
W2	Winnipeg	98

=== Conference Semifinals ===
Note: all times are local

==== Eastern Conference ====
TSN5

August 6
7:30pm

boxscore

Scarborough Shooting Stars 84, Niagara River Lions 86
Scoring by quarter: 19–19, 24–18, 26–31, 15–18
Pts: Anthony Walker 24; Rebs: Khalil Miller 11; Asts: Kellen Tynes, Myles Powell 6	Pts: Khalil Ahmad 17; Rebs: Elijah Lufile 8 Asts: Kyle Vinales 4

Toronto Pan Am Sports Centre, Scarborough, Ontario
Attendance: 2,490
Referees: Ryan Langdon, Chris Buccella, Christine Vuong

TSN+

August 6
7:00pm

boxscore

Brampton Honey Badgers 95, Ottawa BlackJacks 91
Scoring by quarter: 28–18, 22–24, 25–24, 20–25
Pts: Sean East II 29; Rebs: Matthew Moncrieffe 11; Asts: Sean East II 13	Pts: Matthew Cleveland 20; Rebs: Justin Ndjock-Tadjore 8 Asts: Javonte Smart 11

CAA Centre, Brampton, Ontario
Attendance: 2,229
Referees: Nate Saunders, Greg Spagnoli, Tony Turnbull

==== Western Conference ====
TSN5

August 6
7:00pm

boxscore

Vancouver Bandits 92, Edmonton Stingers 83
Scoring by quarter: 27–23, 25–19, 13–25, 27–16
Pts: Shamar Givance 20; Rebs: Tyrese Samuel, Mitch Creek 10; Asts: Shamar Givance 7	Pts: Nick Hornsby 22; Rebs: Nick Hornsby 7 Asts: Nick Hornsby 5

Langley Events Centre, Langley, B.C.
Attendance: 4,547
Referees: Perry Stothart, Cooper Toppings, Tanner Cervo

TSN+

August 6
7:30pm

boxscore

Winnipeg Sea Bears 99, Saskatoon Mamba 88
Scoring by quarter: 32–21, 21–18, 25–28, 21–21
Pts: Jelani Watson-Gayle 27; Rebs: Simon Hildebrandt 8 Asts: Xavier Moon 9	Pts: Tavian Dunn-Martin 28; Rebs: Jaden Bediako 17; Asts: Tavian Dunn-Martin 5

Canada Life Centre, Winnipeg, Manitoba
Attendance: 6,037
Referees: Waseem Husainy, Jayson Stiell, Wyatt Anders

=== Conference Finals ===
Note: all times are local

==== Eastern Conference ====
CBC, TSN2

August 8
1:00pm

boxscore

Brampton Honey Badgers 91, Niagara River Lions 81
Scoring by quarter: 23–20, 17–25, 23–20, 28–16
Pts: Sean East II 22; Rebs: Tegra Izay 12; Asts: Sean East II 4	Pts: Khalil Ahmad 30; Rebs: Elijah Lufile 11; Asts: Kyle Vinales 5

CAA Centre, Brampton, Ontario
Attendance: 2,032
Referees: Nate Saunders, Jayson Stiell, Ryan Langdon

==== Western Conference ====
CBC, TSN2

August 8
12:30pm

boxscore

Vancouver Bandits 96, Winnipeg Sea Bears 107
Scoring by quarter: 25–28, 21–21, 26–26, 24–32
Pts: Simon Hildebrandt, Xavier Moon 24; Rebs: Trey McGowens 6 Asts: Trey McGowens 7	Pts: Shamar Givance 21; Rebs: Mitch Creek 7 Asts: Shamar Givance 11

Langley Events Centre, Langley, B.C.
Attendance: 3,985
Referees: Waseem Husainy, Perry Stothart, Cooper Toppings

=== CEBL Finals ===
Due to arena issues in Brampton, the scheduled best-of-three series was reverted to a single-game final. The original Game 1 was cancelled 1 minute 46 seconds of game time into the first quarter, at a score of 6–6.

CBC, TSN2

August 15
2:30pm

boxscore

Winnipeg Sea Bears 98, Brampton Honey Badgers 84
Scoring by quarter: 20–24, 26–18, 27–18, 25–24
Pts: Xavier Moon 29; Rebs: Xavier Moon 7 Asts: Xavier Moon, DJ Burns 6	Pts: Sean East II 27; Rebs: Matthew Moncrieffe 16; Asts: Sean East II 5

Canada Life Centre, Winnipeg, Manitoba
Attendance: 12,519
Referees: Waseem Husainy, Jayson Stiell, Cooper Toppings

== Awards ==
- Most Valuable Player: Myles Powell, Scarborough Shooting Stars
- Canadian Player of the Year: Tyrese Samuel, Vancouver Bandits
- Development Player of the Year: Easton Thimm, Saskatoon Mamba
- Defensive Player of the year: Kellen Tynes, Scarborough Shooting Stars
- Clutch Player of the Year: Myles Powell, Scarborough Shooting Stars
- Coach of the Year: Tyrell Vernon, Scarborough Shooting Stars
- Sixth Man of the Year: Frank Mitchell Scarborough Shooting Stars
- Officiating Recognition Award: Mike Thomson
- CEBL Finals MVP: Xavier Moon, Winnipeg Sea Bears

=== All-CEBL teams ===
First Team		Pos.		Second Team	
Player	Team	Pos.		Player	Team
Tyrese Samuel	Vancouver Bandits	F		Frank Mitchell	Scarborough Shooting Stars
Sean East II	Brampton Honey Badgers	G	F	Nick Hornsby	Edmonton Stingers
Myles Powell	Scarborough Shooting Stars	G		Tavian Dunn-Martin	Saskatoon Mamba
Teddy Allen	Winnipeg Sea Bears	G		Khalil Ahmad	Niagara River Lions
Javonte Smart	Ottawa BlackJacks	G		Matthew Cleveland	Ottawa BlackJacks

=== All-Canadian team ===
Pos.	Player	Team
F	Tyrese Samuel	Vancouver Bandits
F	Frank Mitchell	Scarborough Shooting Stars
F	Quincy Guerrier	Montreal Alliance
G	Sean Miller-Moore	Calgary Surge
F	Jaden Bediako	Saskatoon Mamba
