= Calgary Surge =

- 2026 CEBL season
- Leagues: CEBL
- Founded: 2018
- History: Guelph Nighthawks (2019–2022); Calgary Surge (2023–present)
- Arena: WinSport Event Centre
- Capacity: 3,200
- Location: Calgary, Alberta, Canada
- Team colours: Red, black, white
- President: Dylan Howe
- General manager: Shane James
- Head coach: David Deaveiro
- Ownership: Usman Tahir Jutt and Jason Ribeiro
- Conference titles: 2 (2023, 2025)
- Website: calgarysurge.ca

The Calgary Surge is a Canadian professional basketball team based in Calgary, Alberta, Canada, that competes in the Canadian Elite Basketball League since 2023. They relocated from Guelph, where they were known as the Guelph Nighthawks. They were renamed and rebranded as the Calgary Surge. The team plays at home at WinSport Event Centre.

== History ==
On August 17, 2022, it was announced that the Guelph Nighthawks would be relocated to Calgary. The franchise plays home games at Winsport Event Centre. On October 19, 2022, they were officially named the Calgary Surge. The Surge played their first game on 27, May 2023 against the Edmonton Stingers, a 74-70 victory.

=== 2023 season ===
For the 2023 CEBL Season the Surge finished with a 12-8 record and first in the Western Conference. In the playoffs the Surge defeated the Edmonton Stingers and the Vancouver Bandits to earn a berth in the championship final against the Scarborough Shooting Stars. The Surge would fall to the Shooting Stars in the final 82-70.

=== 2024 season ===
For the 2024 season the Surge opened with a game against the Edmonton Stingers at the Scotiabank Saddledome. The Surge would break the CEBL regular season attendance record with 12,327 fans. The team paid homage to the Calgary 88s when the switched jerseys at halftime from their "Peace" jerseys to 88s style uniforms. The Stingers would beat the Surge 97-79.

The Surge finished with a 11-9 record in the regular season, earning a spot in the western conference play-in game. They would go on to defeat the Winnipeg Sea Bears 84-82 in the play-in, and then also defeat the Edmonton Stingers 78-69 to earn a spot at championship weekend in Montreal. The Surge fell to the Vancouver Bandits in the Western Conference Final 89-87.

=== 2025 season ===
Prior to the 2025 season, the team announced they would be partnering with the Calgary Stampede to play a game at the Scotiabank Saddledome with a game during the Stampede against the Montreal Alliance on July 9, 2025. The Surge announced they would play an additional game at the Saddledome in their regular season finale on August 10, 2025 against the Niagara River Lions.

On March 12, 2025, the Surge announced they would forego hosting the Edmonton Stingers in Calgary for their only home game in their home city in 2025 and instead move the game to Red Deer, Alberta to take place at Marchant Crane Centrium on June 19, 2025. The Stingers defeated the Surge 98-95.

The Surge would finish the 2025 regular season with a record of 17-7. In the Western Conference play-in the Surge defeated the Edmonton Stingers 103-95 to advance to the Western semi-final against the Vancouver Bandits. Calgary would beat the Bandits 105-103, qualifying for the CEBL Championship Weekend. The Surge would beat the host Winnipeg Sea Bears 90-79, before falling to the defending champions Niagara River Lions in the Final 79-73.

== Players ==
=== Current roster ===
Note: Flags indicate national team eligibility at FIBA-sanctioned events. Players may hold other non-FIBA nationalities not displayed.

Calgary Surge roster
Players
Coaches

Pos.	No.	Nat.	Name	Ht.	Wt.	Age
G	00	(Canada)	Miller-Moore, Sean	6 ft 5 in (1.96 m)
G	1	(Canada)	Jackson, DJ	6 ft 3 in (1.91 m)
G	2	(United States)	Nelson Jr., Jameer	6 ft 1 in (1.85 m)
F	3	(United States)	Brown III, Greg	6 ft 7 in (2.01 m)
G	4	(Canada)	Mané, Karim	6 ft 3 in (1.91 m)
G	5	(Canada)	Gilgeous-Glasgow, Javier	6 ft 2 in (1.88 m)
G	7	(United States)	Thomas, Khyri	6 ft 3 in (1.91 m)
F	8	(Canada)	Tong, Will	6 ft 9 in (2.06 m)
F	13	(Canada)	Boakye, Enoch	6 ft 11 in (2.11 m)
F	15	(South Africa)	Osifo, Osayi	6 ft 9 in (2.06 m)
F	22	(Canada)	Osabuohien, Gabe	6 ft 8 in (2.03 m)
G/F	23	(Canada)	Adelodun, Olumide	6 ft 5 in (1.96 m)
C	32	(Canada)	Brown, Javonte	7 ft 0 in (2.13 m)
F	9	(United States)	Pickett, Jamorko	6 ft 9 in (2.06 m)
G	30	(United States)	Gilyard II, Evan	5 ft 10 in (1.78 m)

Head coach

- (United States) Perry Huang

Assistant coach(es)

- (Canada) John Ross
- (Canada) Mike Girling
- (Canada) Tyson Campbell
- (Canada) Dean Haidar
- (Canada) Kenny Otieno

Legend

- (C) Team captain
- (I) Inactive
- (U) Current U Sports Athlete
- Injured

- Roster
- Transactions
Updated: June 19, 2025

== Honours ==
CEBL Championships

Regular Season Western Conference Champions

Season	W	L	Pct.
2023	12	8	.600

Western Conference Champions

Season	W	L	Pct.
2023	12	8	.600
2025	17	7	.708

All CEBL Teams

First All Star Team

Season	Position	Player
2023	Forward	Simi Shittu
2025	Forward	Greg Brown III

Second All Star Team

Season	Player
2025	Jameer Nelson Jr.

All Canadian Team

Season	Position	Player	Hometown
2023	Guard	Sean Miller–Moore	Brampton, Ontario
2023	Forward	Simi Shittu	Burlington, Ontario
2024	Guard	Sean Miller–Moore	Brampton, Ontario
2024	Guard	Mathieu Kamba	Calgary, Alberta
2025	Guard	Sean Miller–Moore	Brampton, Ontario

Individual Awards

Clutch Player of The Year

Season	Player
2024	Stefan Smith

Defensive Player of The Year

Season	Player
2025	Jameer Nelson Jr.

== Season-by-season record ==
League	Season	Coach	Regular season				Postseason			
League	Season	Coach	Won	Lost	Win %	Finish	Won	Lost	Win %	Result
CEBL	2023	Nelson Terroba	12	8	.600	1st West	2	1	.667	Lost Finals
CEBL	2024	Tyrell Vernon	11	9	.550	3rd West	2	1	.667	Lost semi-Finals
CEBL	2025	Kaleb Canales	17	7	.708	2nd West	3	1	.750	Lost Finals
CEBL	2026	Perry Huang	0	7	.000	5th West	Fired midseason			
CEBL	2026	David Deaveiro	8	9	.471	5th West	did not qualify			
Totals			48	40	.545	—	7	3	.700	
