= Brampton Honey Badgers =

- 2026 CEBL season
- Leagues: CEBL
- Founded: 2018
- History: Hamilton Honey Badgers; 2019–2022; Brampton Honey Badgers; 2022–present
- Arena: CAA Centre
- Capacity: 5,000
- Location: Brampton, Ontario, Canada
- Team colours: Black, gold, white
- President: Josie Pingitore
- General manager: Jermaine Anderson
- Head coach: Alex Cerda
- Ownership: Leonard Asper
- Championships: 1 (2022)
- Conference titles: 1 (2026)
- Website: honeybadgers.ca

The Brampton Honey Badgers are a Canadian professional basketball team based in Brampton, Ontario, that competes in the Canadian Elite Basketball League. They play their games at the CAA Centre. The Honey Badgers are led by head coach Alex Cerda since his hiring in 2026. The team was founded in 2018 as the Hamilton Honey Badgers and played at the FirstOntario Centre in Hamilton, Ontario from their inaugural season in 2019 until 2022.

== History ==
On May 2, 2018, the Canadian Elite Basketball League announced Hamilton, Ontario, as one of the original six teams for its inaugural season beginning May 2019. On June 12, 2018, at a press conference the CEBL announced the logo and name of its Hamilton franchise as the Hamilton Honey Badgers, a nickname inspired by the world's most fearless animal. The team also announced the hiring of former Toronto Raptors' executive John Lashway as team president. On December 19, 2019, the organization appointed Jermaine Anderson as the new general manager of the team.

The Honey Badgers won their first game, at home over Edmonton, 103–86 on May 12, 2019.

The Honey Badgers made the playoffs and defeated the Niagara River Lions but lost in the CEBL Finals to the Saskatchewan Rattlers.

The Honey Badgers won their first title on August 14, 2022, against the Scarborough Shooting Stars, 90–88, clinching a berth, at the 2022–23 BCL Americas.

On November 28, 2022, the league announced due to renovations to the FirstOntario Centre, the Honey Badgers had relocated to Brampton permanently.

On March 4, 2025, the Honey Badgers were purchased from the CEBL by Canadian businessman Leonard Asper. The team was owned by the CEBL prior to the announcement and became the 8th privately owned team in the CEBL. Asper is the older brother of Winnipeg Sea Bears owner David Asper.

== Players ==
=== Current roster ===
Note: Flags indicate national team eligibility at FIBA-sanctioned events. Players may hold other non-FIBA nationalities not displayed.

Brampton Honey Badgers roster
Players
Coaches

Pos.	No.	Nat.	Name	Ht.	Wt.	Age
G	21	(Canada)	Brown, Jevon	6 ft 5 in (1.96 m)	200 lb (91 kg)	28 – 30 May 1998
G	7	(Canada) (Jamaica)	Newby, Jabs	6 ft 2 in (1.88 m)	192 lb (87 kg)	34 – 15 August 1992
F	17	(Canada)	Nurhussein, Ayub	6 ft 10 in (2.08 m)	190 lb (86 kg)	23 – 14 December 2002
G	13	(Canada)	Okafor, Michael	6 ft 4 in (1.93 m)	200 lb (91 kg)	27 – 20 April 1999
F	—	(Canada)	Price-Noel, Jahbril	6 ft 7 in (2.01 m)	215 lb (98 kg)	26 – 19 December 1999
G	6	(Canada)	Walker, David	6 ft 4 in (1.93 m)	210 lb (95 kg)	27 – 28 September 1999

Head coach

- (Canada) Sheldon Cassimy

Legend

- (C) Team captain
- (I) Inactive
- Injured

- Roster
- Transactions
Updated: December 16, 2024

=== Notable players ===
- (Greece) (Canada) Elijah Mitrou-Long
- (United States) Christian Vital
- (United States) M. J. Walker
- (United States) Brianté Weber

== Honours ==
CEBL Championships

Year	Winning Coach	W	L	Pct.
2022	Ryan Schmidt	14	6	.700

Eastern Conference Champions

Year	Winning coach	W	L	Pct.
2026	Alex Cerda	11	13	.458

Regular season top team

Season	W	L	Pct
2022	14	6	.700

All CEBL Teams

First All Star Team

Season	Position	Player
2019	Guard	Ricky Tarrant Jr.
2020	Guard	Jean-Victor Mukama
2021	Guard	Lindell Wigginton
2022	Guard	Caleb Agada
2026	Guard	Sean East II

Second All Star Team

Season	Position	Player
2020	Forward	Owen Klassen
2020	Guard	Brianté Weber
2022	Guard	Christian Vital
2023	Guard	Christian Vital

All Canadian Team

Season	Player	Hometown
2021	Lindell Wigginton	Halifax, Nova Scotia
2022	Caleb Agada	Burlington, Ontario

Individual Awards

CEBL Finals MVP

Season	Player
2022	Christian Vital

CEBL Coach of The Year

Season	Coach	W	L	Pct.
2022	Ryan Schmidt	14	6	.700

Canadian Player of The Year

Season	Player	Hometown
2021	Lindell Wigginton	Halifax, Nova Scotia
2022	Caleb Agada	Burlington, Ontario

Defensive Player of The Year

Season	Player
2020	Brianté Weber

Sixth Man of The Year Award

Season	Player
2022	Koby McEwen

Clutch Player of The Year Award

Season	Player
2020	Brianté Weber
2021	Lindell Wigginton

Community Ambassador Award

Season	Player
2019	Matt Marshall

== Season-by-season record ==
League	Season	Coach	Regular season				Postseason			
League	Season	Coach	Won	Lost	Win %	Finish	Won	Lost	Win %	Result
CEBL
CEBL	2019	Chantal Vallée	10	10	.500	4th	1	1	.500	Lost finals
CEBL	2020	Ryan Schmidt	3	3	.500	3rd	1	1	.500	Lost semi-finals
CEBL	2021	Ryan Schmidt	9	5	.643	3rd	0	1	.000	Lost quarter-finals
CEBL	2022	Ryan Schmidt	14	6	.700	1st	2	0	1.000	Won CEBL Championship
CEBL	2023	Antoine Broxsie	8	12	.400	4th East	0	1	.000	Lost Play in Round
CEBL	2024	Sheldon Cassimy	6	14	.300	5th East	Did not qualify			
CEBL	2025	Sheldon Cassimy	5	19	.208	5th East	Did not qualify			
CEBL	2026	Alex Cerda	11	13	.458	2nd East	2	1	.667	Lost Finals
Totals			66	92	.418	—	6	5	.545	
