= Scarborough Shooting Stars =

Canadian professional basketball team

- 2026 CEBL season
- Leagues: CEBL
- Founded: 2021
- History: Scarborough Shooting Stars (2021–present)
- Arena: Toronto Pan Am Sports Centre
- Capacity: 2,000
- Location: Toronto, Ontario, Canada
- Team colours: Turquoise, black, grey and white
- General manager: Brady Heslip
- Head coach: Tyrell Vernon
- Ownership: Niko Carino & Sam Ibrahim
- Championships: 1 (2023)
- Conference titles: 1 (2023)
- Website: scarboroughshootingstars.ca

The Scarborough Shooting Stars are a Canadian professional basketball team based in Toronto, Ontario, Canada. They compete in the Canadian Elite Basketball League (CEBL) and play their home games at the Toronto Pan Am Sports Centre in the eastern district of Scarborough near the University of Toronto Scarborough Founded in 2021, the Shooting Stars are the first professional sports team to be based in Scarborough. The Shooting Stars are currently led by head coach Tyrell Vernon.

== History ==
The Scarborough Shooting Stars were established on August 16, 2021, owned by Nicholas “Niko” Carino (co-founder of record label OVO Sound) & Sam Ibrahim (founding member of venture capital firm Playground Global). They are the eighth franchise of the league and made their debut in the 2022 CEBL season. They were the first franchise from the Greater Toronto Area. Scarborough native Chris Exilus became the first head coach of the team. In May, the Shooting Stars gained worldwide attention when rapper Jermaine Cole (known under his artist name J.Cole) signed with the team. Other notable players in the Shooting Stars' debut season included Jalen Harris and Xavier Rathan-Mayes.

In the Shooting Stars' first season, they reached the CEBL Finals after beating Saskatchewan in the quarter-finals and Niagara in the semi-finals. In the finals, the Hamilton Honey Badgers narrowly defeated them, 90–88. After the season, Isiaha Mike and Jalen Harris were named to the 2022 All-CEBL First Team.

== Arena ==
The Shooting Stars play their games at the Toronto Pan Am Sports Centre. It is located at the University of Toronto Scarborough campus.

== Players ==
=== Current roster ===
Note: Flags indicate national team eligibility at FIBA-sanctioned events. Players may hold other non-FIBA nationalities not displayed.

Scarborough Shooting Stars roster
Players
Coaches

Pos.	No.	Nat.	Name	Ht.	Wt.	Age
PG	12	(United States)	Barber, Cat	6 ft 1 in (1.85 m)	174 lb (79 kg)	32 – 25 July 1994
G	14	(Canada)	Bediako, Charles	7 ft 0 in (2.13 m)	225 lb (102 kg)	24 – 10 March 2002
G	--	(Canada)	Cummings, A. J.	6 ft 3 in (1.91 m)
G	23	(Canada)	Duke, Kyle	6 ft 2 in (1.88 m)	185 lb (84 kg)	24 – 10 July 2002
F	1	(United States)	Johnson, Javan	6 ft 7 in (2.01 m)	192 lb (87 kg)	27 – 5 January 1999
G/F	22	(Canada)	Lam, Kobey	6 ft 0 in (1.83 m)	170 lb (77 kg)	26 – 2 March 2000
F	4	(Canada)	Miller, Khalil	6 ft 8 in (2.03 m)	220 lb (100 kg)	30 – 8 February 1996
F	00	(Canada)	Mitchell, Frank	6 ft 8 in (2.03 m)	270 lb (120 kg)	24 – 1 January 2002
F	55	(Canada)	Muenkat, David	6 ft 6 in (1.98 m)	220 lb (100 kg)	26 – 2 July 2000
G	13	(United States)	Powell, Myles	6 ft 2 in (1.88 m)	195 lb (88 kg)	29 – 7 July 1997
G/F	11	(United States)	Scrubb, Jay	6 ft 4 in (1.93 m)	220 lb (100 kg)	26 – 1 September 2000
PF	25	(United States)	Simms, Aamir	6 ft 8 in (2.03 m)	245 lb (111 kg)	27 – 17 February 1999
G	2	(Canada)	Thomas, Trey	6 ft 0 in (1.83 m)	160 lb (73 kg)	25 – 27 January 2001
PG	5	(Canada)	Tynes, Kellen	6 ft 3 in (1.91 m)	220 lb (100 kg)	25 – 5 September 2001
F	6	(United States)	Walker, Anthony	6 ft 9 in (2.06 m)	220 lb (100 kg)	33 – 22 July 1993
G	10	(Canada)	Wise, Phoenyx	6 ft 4 in (1.93 m)		19 – 12 June 2007
F	9	(Canada)	Yuot, Akoi	6 ft 8 in (2.03 m)		25 – 6 January 2001

Head coach

- (Canada) Tyrell Vernon

Assistant coach(es)

- (Canada) Daniel Fanone
- (Canada) Kyle Johnson
- (Canada) Daniel Mullings
- (Canada) Tyrone Watson

Legend

- (C) Team captain
- (I) Inactive
- Injured

- Roster
- Transactions
Updated: July 1, 2026

=== Notable players ===
- (Canada) Kyle Alexander
- (Canada) Nick Ongenda
- (Canada) Jackson Rowe
- (Germany) J. Cole
- (United States) Yuri Collins
- (United States) * (Jamaica) Joirdon Nicholas

== Honours ==
- CEBL

Regular season top team (1): 2026
regular season Eastern Conference winners (1): 2026
Eastern Conference Champions (1): 2023
Champions (1): 2023

== Season-by-season record ==
League	Season	Coach	Regular season				Postseason			
League	Season	Coach	Won	Lost	Win %	Finish	Won	Lost	Win %	Result
CEBL
CEBL	2022	Chris Exilus	12	8	.600	3rd	2	1	.667	Lost Finals
CEBL	2023	Chris Exilus	11	9	.550	3rd East	4	0	1.000	Won CEBL Championship
CEBL	2024	Devan Blair	12	8	.600	2nd East	0	1	.000	Lost Play in round
CEBL	2025	Mike De Giorgio	11	13	.458	3rd East	2	1	.667	Lost semi-final
CEBL	2026	Tyrell Vernon	20	4	.833	1st East	0	1	.000	Lost quarterfinal
Totals			66	42	.611	—	8	4	.667	
