= Canadian Elite Basketball League =

Professional men's basketball league

- Sport: Basketball
- Founded: 25 October 2017; 9 years ago
- First season: 2019
- President: Tyler Mazereeuw
- Administrator: Canada Basketball
- Motto: This is Our Game
- No. of teams: 10
- Country: Canada
- Confederation: FIBA Americas
- Most recent champions: Winnipeg Sea Bears (1st title) (2026)
- Most titles: Edmonton Stingers; Niagara River Lions (2 titles)
- Broadcasters: Canada: CBC Sports / CBC Gem / TSN / TSN+; International: Next Level Sports (United States); Fox Sports Australia (Australia); TapGo (Philippines); SingTel (Singapore); Astro (Malaysia)
- International cup: Champions League
- Website: CEBL.ca
- 2026 CEBL season

The Canadian Elite Basketball League (CEBL; French: Ligue élite canadienne de basketball—LÉCB) is the premier men's professional basketball league in Canada, as recognized by Canada Basketball. The CEBL was founded in 2017 and began play in 2019 with six teams all owned and operated by ownership group Canadian Basketball Ventures.

The league currently consists of 10 teams from six provinces, with four from Ontario, two from Alberta, and one each from British Columbia, Manitoba, Saskatchewan, and Quebec, the largest number of teams of any professional sports league operating entirely in Canada.

CEBL teams play 24 regular-season games from May to August. The season culminates with the top four teams in each conference making the playoffs. The first two rounds are single elimination format, with the finals being best-of-three.

== History ==
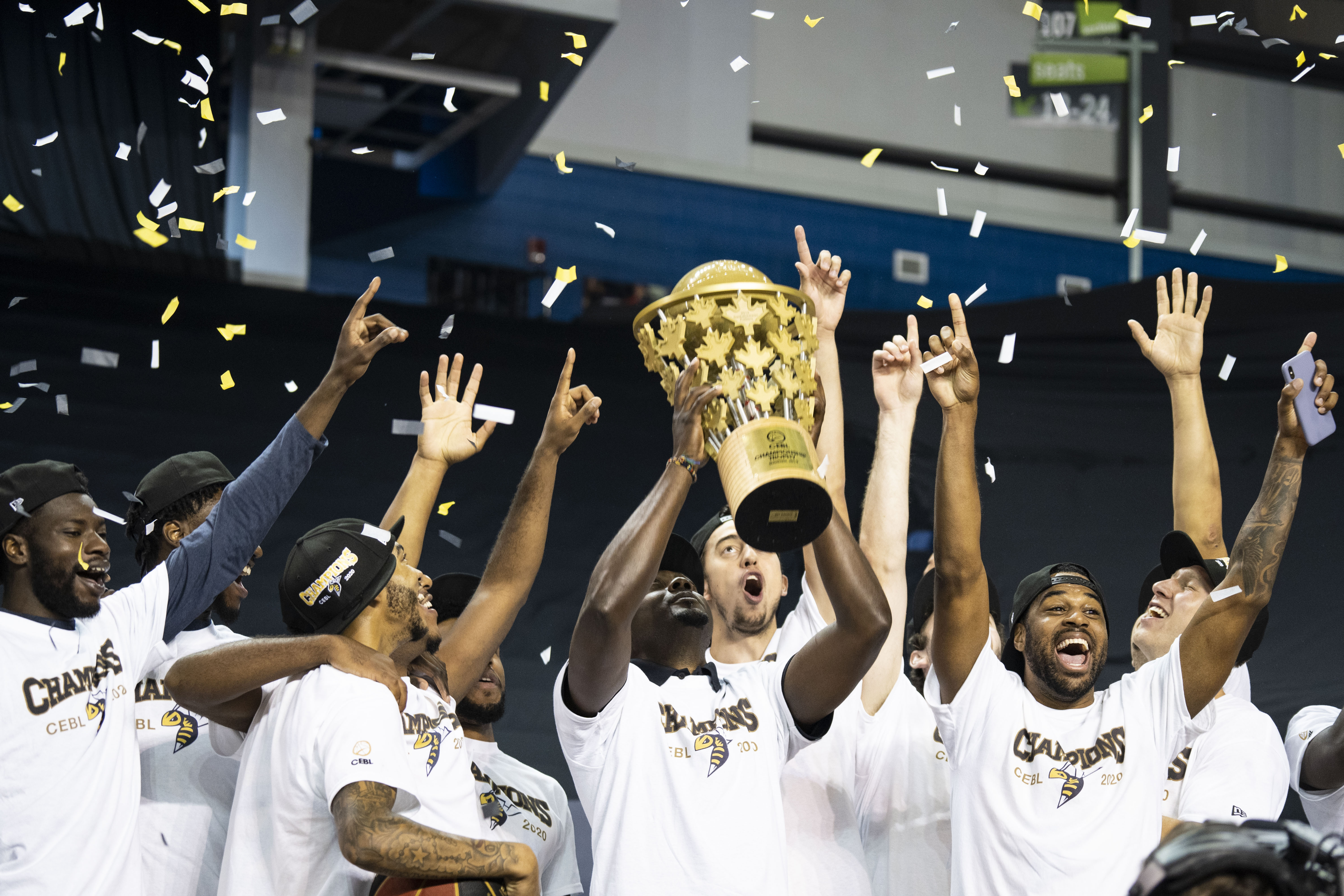
The Edmonton Stingers holding the CEBL trophy in 2020

The CEBL was first announced in October 2017. Niagara River Lions owner Richard Petko had been dissatisfied with the operations of the National Basketball League of Canada, which he deemed to be a "shoestring business" with no vision. He attempted to persuade the league to hire Mike Morreale, a former Canadian Football League player who, Petko felt, could do better at marketing the league and attracting sponsorship. However, after the NBL declined, Petko and Morreale decided to organize their own league, with Morreale as CEO. The six charter teams were officially unveiled in May 2018, with the River Lions joining five newly created franchises in Edmonton, AB, Guelph, ON, Hamilton, ON, Saskatoon, SK, and Abbotsford, BC (moved to Langley in 2021).

Morreale stated that the CEBL would emphasize offering a "party wrapped around a basketball game" with "a ton of value for the fans" in order to attract spectators, including outdoor pre-game events, in-arena entertainment, autograph sessions, and other features. The CEBL initially operated as a single entity, with all teams owned by the league under individual general managers. The league has gradually moved teams towards local ownership, with six teams in 2023 having independent ownership.

In December 2018, the CEBL reached a five-year deal with New Era to be the official apparel provider of the league. The CEBL also reached an official agreement with Canada Basketball for it to be recognized as its first division professional league (in a league system akin to European competition); this endorsement also allows the CEBL access to resources from the governing body. Canada Basketball CEO Glen Grunwald stated that the league would provide an "exciting new product and a further development opportunity for Canadian players, coaches, referees, administrators and management types." Due to this agreement, the league plays under the standard FIBA rules.

In January 2019, the CEBL announced a three-year agreement with Spalding to be the official ball of the league.

Due to the COVID-19 pandemic, the 2020 CEBL season was postponed, and conducted as a shortened tournament in a bio-secure bubble behind closed doors, branded as the CEBL Summer Series. Beginning in the 2020 season, the CEBL adopted the Elam Ending—as recently popularized by The Basketball Tournament and the NBA All-Star Game—for all games, under which the game clock is turned off near the end of the fourth quarter, and teams play to a target score to determine the winner.

In the 2021–22 season, the Edmonton Stingers represented Canada in the Basketball Champions League Americas (BCLA).

=== Expansion ===
In November 2019, the Ottawa BlackJacks were announced as the league's first expansion team, and seventh overall, beginning in the 2020 season.

In February 2021, Morreale announced that an expansion team in Montreal would be added no earlier than the 2022 season; due to COVID-19, no new expansion teams were added for the 2021 season. Later in 2021, the Scarborough Shooting Stars, the Montreal Alliance, and the Newfoundland Growlers were all announced as expansion teams for the 2022 season.

In November 2022, the league announced that the Winnipeg Sea Bears would join the CEBL in the 2023 season, while the Newfoundland Growlers would be suspending operations. In August 2022, the league announced that the Guelph Nighthawks would be relocating to Calgary, Alberta as the Calgary Surge.

In August 2023, the CEBL Clash was played at the Videotron Centre in Quebec City. It was an all-star game between top players from the Eastern and Western Conferences. The event was done in partnership with Gestev, a subsidiary of Quebecor Sports and Entertainment Group. Upon announcing the CEBL Clash, it was confirmed that Gestev is seriously considering support for an expansion team in Quebec City for 2024 based on the success of the event. The CEBL Clash attracted over 7,000 spectators. Another team in the West will join along with the unnamed Quebec City team to keep the conferences balanced.

On September 18, 2026, the KW Titans of the Basketball Super League announced they had submitted a proposal to join the CEBL. If approved, the team would join as early as the 2027 season.

=== Outdoors ===
On May 25, 2025, the Montreal Alliance hosted the Ottawa BlackJacks in a CEBL game outdoors at IGA Stadium. According to the league, this was "the first professional five-on-five basketball game held outdoors in Canadian history." The match was suspended at half-time and declared a "no contest" due to condensation on the court which created slippery conditions.

== Game format ==
CEBL games are five-on-five in four quarters of ten minutes each.

Beginning in 2020, the league implemented an Elam Ending system: after the first time stoppage in the last four minutes of the final quarter, the game clock is turned off and the target score is set at 9 more than the current leading score. For example, if the score was 110-105, then the target score is 119 and the first team to reach that wins.

== Teams ==
=== Current teams ===
Overview of Canadian Elite Basketball League teams
Conference	Team	City	Venue	Capacity	Founded	First season	Head coach
Eastern Conference	Brampton Honey Badgers	Brampton, Ontario	CAA Centre	5,000	2018	2023	Alex Cerda
Eastern Conference	Montreal Alliance	Montreal, Quebec	Verdun Auditorium	4,114	2021	2022	Vacant
Eastern Conference	Niagara River Lions	St. Catharines, Ontario	Meridian Centre	4,030	2015	2019	Kimbal Mackenzie
Eastern Conference	Ottawa BlackJacks	Ottawa, Ontario	TD Place Arena	9,500	2019	2020	Justin Mazzulla
Eastern Conference	Scarborough Shooting Stars	Toronto, Ontario	Toronto Pan Am Sports Centre	2,000	2021	2022	Tyrell Vernon
Western Conference	Calgary Surge	Calgary, Alberta	Winsport Arena	2,900	2018	2023	David DeAveiro (interim)
Western Conference	Edmonton Stingers	Edmonton, Alberta	Edmonton Expo Centre	4,857	2018	2019	Jordan Baker
Western Conference	Saskatoon Mamba	Saskatoon, Saskatchewan	SaskTel Centre/Merlis Belsher Place	5,898, 2,700	2018	2019	Isaiah Fox
Western Conference	Vancouver Bandits	Langley, British Columbia	Langley Events Centre	5,276	2017	2019	Ransford Brempong (interim)
Western Conference	Winnipeg Sea Bears	Winnipeg, Manitoba	Canada Life Centre	15,321	2022	2023	Mike Raimbault

2025 Canadian Elite Basketball League teams
See Southern Ontario inset
2025 Canadian Elite Basketball League teams within Southern Ontario

=== Former teams ===
Former Canadian Elite Basketball League teams
Team	City	Founded	First season	Last season	Defunct	Reason
Guelph Nighthawks	Guelph, Ontario	2018	2019	2022	2022	Relocated to Calgary after 2022 season
Newfoundland Growlers	St. John's, Newfoundland and Labrador	2021	2022	2022	2022	Folded after 2022 season
Hamilton Honey Badgers	Hamilton, Ontario	2018	2019	2022	2022	Relocated to Brampton after 2022 season

== Championships ==
CEBL champions
Season	Champion	Runner-up
2019	Saskatchewan Rattlers	Hamilton Honey Badgers
2020	Edmonton Stingers	Fraser Valley Bandits
2021	Edmonton Stingers	Niagara River Lions
2022	Hamilton Honey Badgers	Scarborough Shooting Stars
2023	Scarborough Shooting Stars	Calgary Surge
2024	Niagara River Lions	Vancouver Bandits
2025	Niagara River Lions	Calgary Surge
2026	Winnipeg Sea Bears	Brampton Honey Badgers

== Organization ==
=== Executives ===
As of June 2026, league executives include:

- Tyler Mazereeuw, Commissioner and Chief Executive Officer
- Shannon Davidson, Chief Operating Officer
- Ansh Sanyal, Vice President, Brand and Marketing

=== Players ===
The CEBL's main focus will be on showcasing and developing Canadian talent in basketball: at least 70% of each team's roster must consist of Canadian players. As it will be played over the spring and summer months, the CEBL also sought to attract players wanting to continue developing their game over the traditional offseason period. Players were expected to be drawn from collegiate alumni (including U Sports and U.S. NCAA basketball), players with experience in other international leagues, as well as members of the Canadian national team.

The salary cap is $8,000 to $9,000 per team per game.

=== Broadcasting ===
During the first season, games were primarily streamed on an in-house platform known as CEBL.tv; the league stated that it would provide the necessary means for each team to produce "a really good official and professional looking live stream that we can share without any kind of limitations to who can see it." The league considered the possibility of selling television rights to its championship to a traditional broadcaster. On June 12, 2019, the CEBL announced that CBC Sports would stream all remaining games of the inaugural season on its digital platforms. It subsequently announced in November 2019 that CBC Sports had agreed to a three-year deal, which will also see eight games (seven regular-season games and the championship game) per-season aired on CBC Television. In 2021 the league launched its CEBL+ streaming service. All games are streamed through the platform, with games in Canada streamed for free.

For the 2020 season, the CEBL also began streaming games on Twitch. On August 7, the CEBL and Mediapro announced new rights deals in the Asia-Pacific and Oceania regions, such as Astro (Malaysia), Fox Sports Australia, SingTel, Sportscast (Taiwan), and TapGo (Philippines).

A feature-length documentary about the 2020 "Summer Series", produced by Ward 1 Studios, was broadcast May 29, 2021 on CBC.

Ahead of the 2023 season, the CEBL announced a broadcast rights agreement with Bell Media. Games aired on TSN in English and RDS in French, with a "game of the week" package on TSN throughout the season, RDS particularly carrying Montreal Alliance games, and all games streaming on TSN+.

On March 3, 2026, the CEBL announced that the CBC would again be the leagues broadcast partner for 2026–2030. Select games would be shown on CBC Television, and all games would be carried on CBC Gem and the CBC Sports channel on YouTube.

In August 2026, the league announced a partnership with TSN and TSN+ to deliver coverage of the playoffs.
