= R4 41st Ave =

Express bus service in Metro Vancouver, Canada

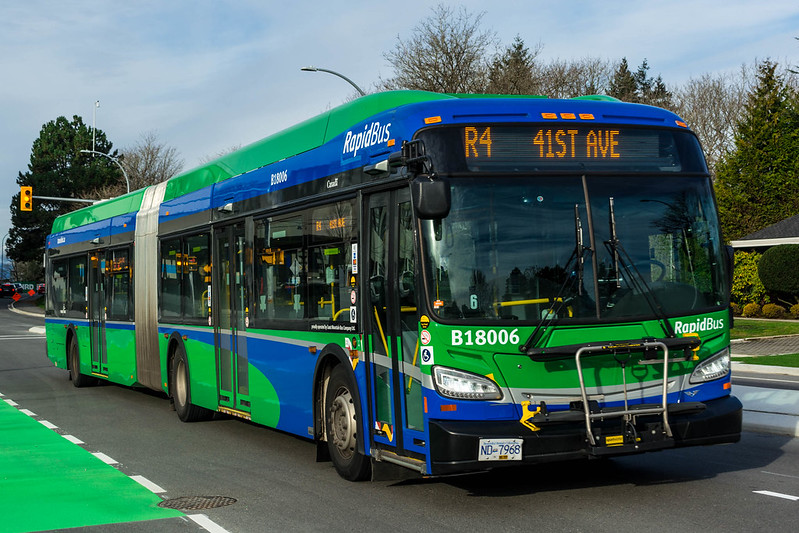
- R4 bus en route to Joyce Station

Overview
- System: TransLink
- Operator: Coast Mountain Bus Company
- Began service: January 6, 2020

Route
- Start: UBC Exchange
- End: Joyce–Collingwood station
- Length: 19.1 km (11.9 mi) (Note: Based on the 43 Express route)
- Stops: 17

Service
- Ridership: 27,480 (avg. weekday; 2025)
Route map
R4 41st Ave highlighted in green
Key

The R4 41st Ave (designated the 91 B-Line during planning stages) is an express bus route with bus rapid transit elements in Metro Vancouver, British Columbia, Canada. Part of TransLink's RapidBus network, it replaced the 43 Express that travelled along 41st Avenue, a major east–west route that connects the University of British Columbia (UBC) to the SkyTrain system's Oakridge–41st Avenue station on the Canada Line and Joyce–Collingwood station on the Expo Line.

== History ==
Originally outlined in the 2005 Vancouver/UBC Transit Plan as the 91 B-Line, the route was planned to be operational in December 2009, replacing the 43 Express peak-only service between Joyce–Collingwood station and UBC. However, shortfalls in the 2010 TransLink budget resulted in a delay in the implementation of this route, the 95 B-Line (replacing 135 Express service on Hastings Street), and other service expansions. Nevertheless, the 43 Express was included as a main transit connection in a plan released following the opening of the Canada Line, indicating the importance of the route within the TransLink network.

On November 23, 2016, the Mayors' Council and TransLink's board of directors approved the first phase of the 10-Year Vision, which included provisions for new B-Line routes (including the 41st Avenue B-Line) which began service on January 6, 2020. On July 23, 2019, the route was officially rebranded the R4 41st Ave.

The R4 41st Ave RapidBus was the second busiest bus route in TransLink's network in 2025, with 8,592,000 total boardings.

== Route description ==
The R4 travels mainly on 41st Avenue in Vancouver, and also along Joyce Street, Southwest Marine Drive, West 16th Avenue, and Wesbrook Mall.

- UBC Exchange – Western terminus, serving UBC's campus centre; transfer point for services to other Vancouver neighbourhoods, Richmond, Burnaby, and West Vancouver.
- Agronomy Road – Serves the southern part of UBC's campus; transfer point for services to other Vancouver neighbourhoods, Richmond, and Burnaby.
- West 16th Avenue – Serves Thunderbird Park and Wesbrook Village
- Dunbar Loop – Transfer point for 2 Downtown, 7 Nanaimo Station, 32 Downtown, 49 Metrotown Station / UBC
- Carnarvon Street – Transfer point for 2 Macdonald/Downtown, N22 Macdonald/Downtown
- East Boulevard – Serves Kerrisdale; transfer point for 16 Arbutus / 29th Avenue Station
- Granville Street – Transfer point for 10 Granville/Downtown, 480 Bridgeport Station / UBC, N10 Richmond–Brighouse Station / Downtown
- Oak Street – Transfer point for 17 Oak/Downtown
- Oakridge–41st Avenue station – Serves Oakridge and Cambie Street; transfer point for the Canada Line, 15 Cambie / Olympic Village Station, N15 Cambie/Downtown
- Main Street – Transfer point for 3 Main/Downtown
- Fraser Street – Transfer point for 8 Fraser/Downtown, N8 Fraser/Downtown
- Knight Street – Transfer point for 22 Knight/Downtown
- Victoria Drive – Transfer point for 20 Victoria/Downtown, N20 Victoria/Downtown
- Clarendon Street – Transfer point for 29 Elliott / 29th Avenue Station
- Rupert Street - Transfer point for 26 Joyce–Collingwood Station / 29th Avenue Station
- Kingsway – Transfer point for 19 Metrotown Station / Stanley Park, 27 Kootenay Loop / Joyce–Collingwood Station, N19 Downtown / Surrey Central Station
- Joyce–Collingwood station – Eastern terminus, serving the Collingwood neighbourhood; transfer point for the Expo Line and bus services to other Vancouver neighbourhoods, Burnaby, and North Vancouver

== See also ==
- List of bus routes in Metro Vancouver
