= Dunbar Loop =

Major transit exchange in Vancouver, Canada

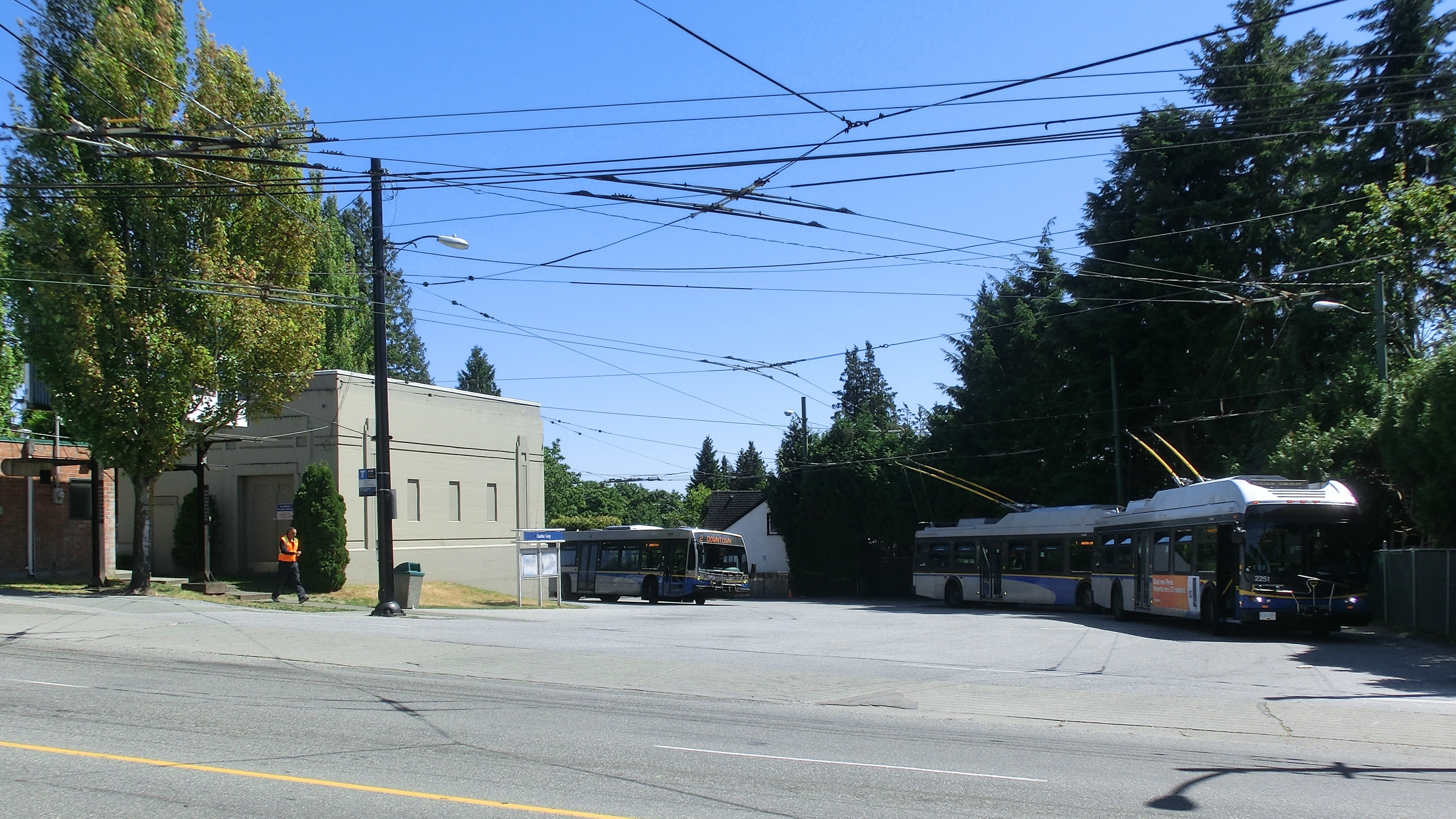

General information
- Location: Dunbar St at W 41st Ave; Vancouver, British Columbia; Canada
- Coordinates: 49.23447°N 123.1858°W
- Operator: TransLink
- Bus routes: 8
- Bus stands: 7
- Bus operators: Coast Mountain Bus Company
- Connections: R4 41st Ave

Other information
- Fare zone: 1

History
- Opened: May 22, 1950
Location

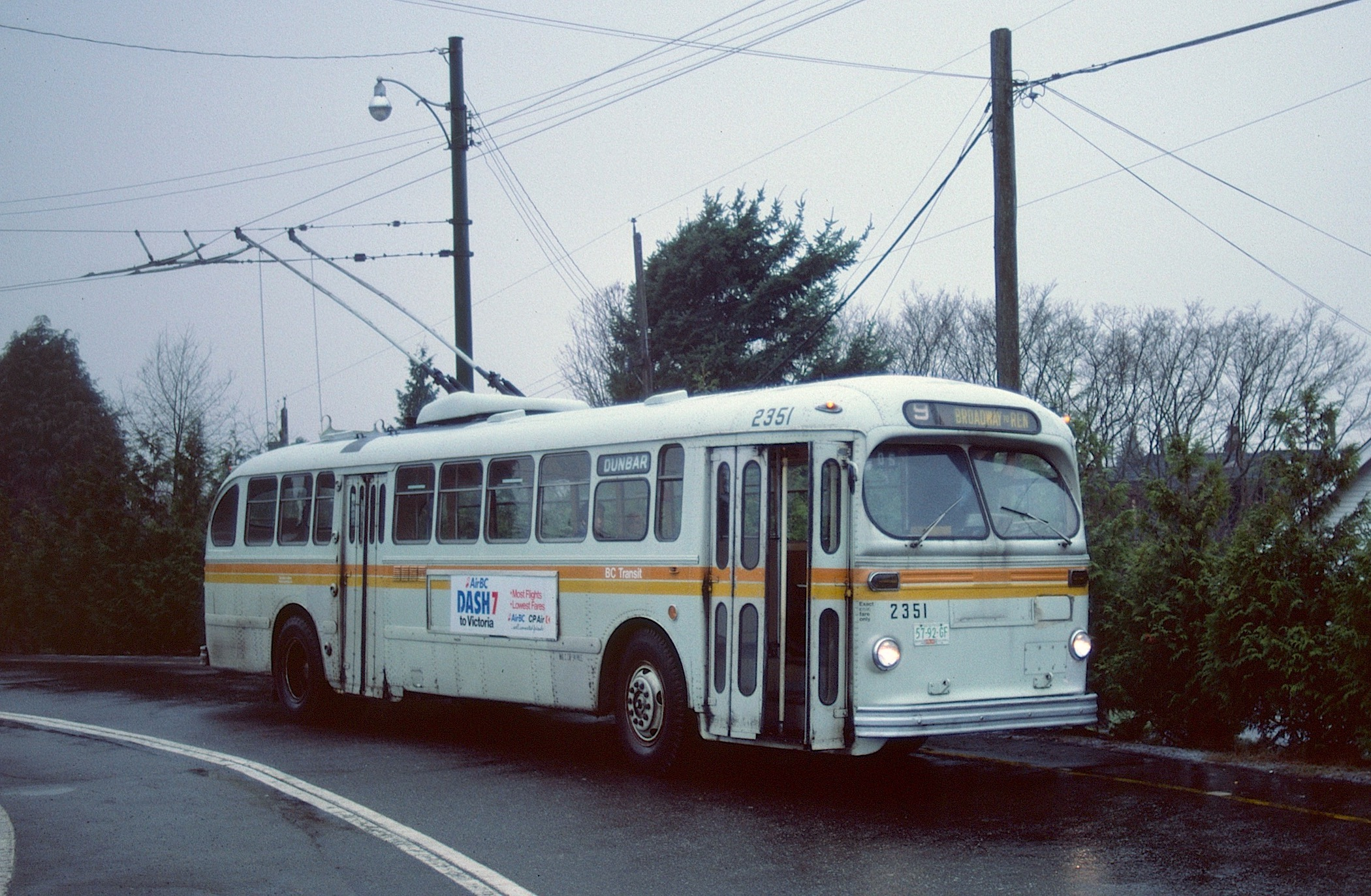
A 1951 CCF–Brill trolley bus at Dunbar Loop in 1983, on route 7

Dunbar Loop is a major transit exchange located in the Dunbar–Southlands neighbourhood of Vancouver, British Columbia, Canada. It opened on May 22, 1950, and is the westernmost exchange in the City of Vancouver.

Dunbar Loop can accommodate both diesel and trolley buses of various lengths, including articulated buses. It is part of the TransLink system and also acts as a power station for trolleys.

== Structure and location ==
Dunbar Loop is located at the intersection of Dunbar Street and West 41st Avenue in the Dunbar–Southlands neighbourhood of Vancouver. The majority of the services at this exchange load and unload at Dunbar Street or 41st Avenue, while 2 services (2 and N22) load and unload inside the loop.

Because of its proximity to the University of British Columbia (UBC) and the University Endowment Lands, it is heavily used by students. All routes going westbound from Dunbar Loop terminate at UBC during regular weekday hours.

== Routes ==
Bay	Location	Routes	Notes
1	Dunbar Street; Southbound	49 Metrotown Station	
1	Dunbar Street; Southbound	Unloading only: 7, 32	
2	Dunbar Loop	2 Downtown	Burrard Station
2	Dunbar Loop	N22 Downtown	NightBus service
3	41st Avenue; Eastbound	41 Joyce Station	
3	41st Avenue; Eastbound	480 Bridgeport Station	Peak hours only; Express route; Route temporarily suspended due to the COVID-19 pandemic
4	41st Avenue; Westbound	49 UBC	Late night trips terminate at Dunbar Loop
5	41st Avenue; Westbound	R4 41st Ave to UBC	RapidBus service
5	41st Avenue; Westbound	41 Crown	
5	41st Avenue; Westbound	480 UBC	Peak hours only; Express route; Route temporarily suspended due to the COVID-19 pandemic
6	Dunbar Street; Northbound	7 Nanaimo Station	
6	Dunbar Street; Northbound	32 Downtown	AM peak hours only; Route temporarily suspended due to the COVID-19 pandemic
7	41st Avenue; Eastbound	R4 41st Ave to Joyce Station	RapidBus service
