= Trolley buses in Vancouver =

Transit system in British Columbia, Canada

Vancouver trolley bus system
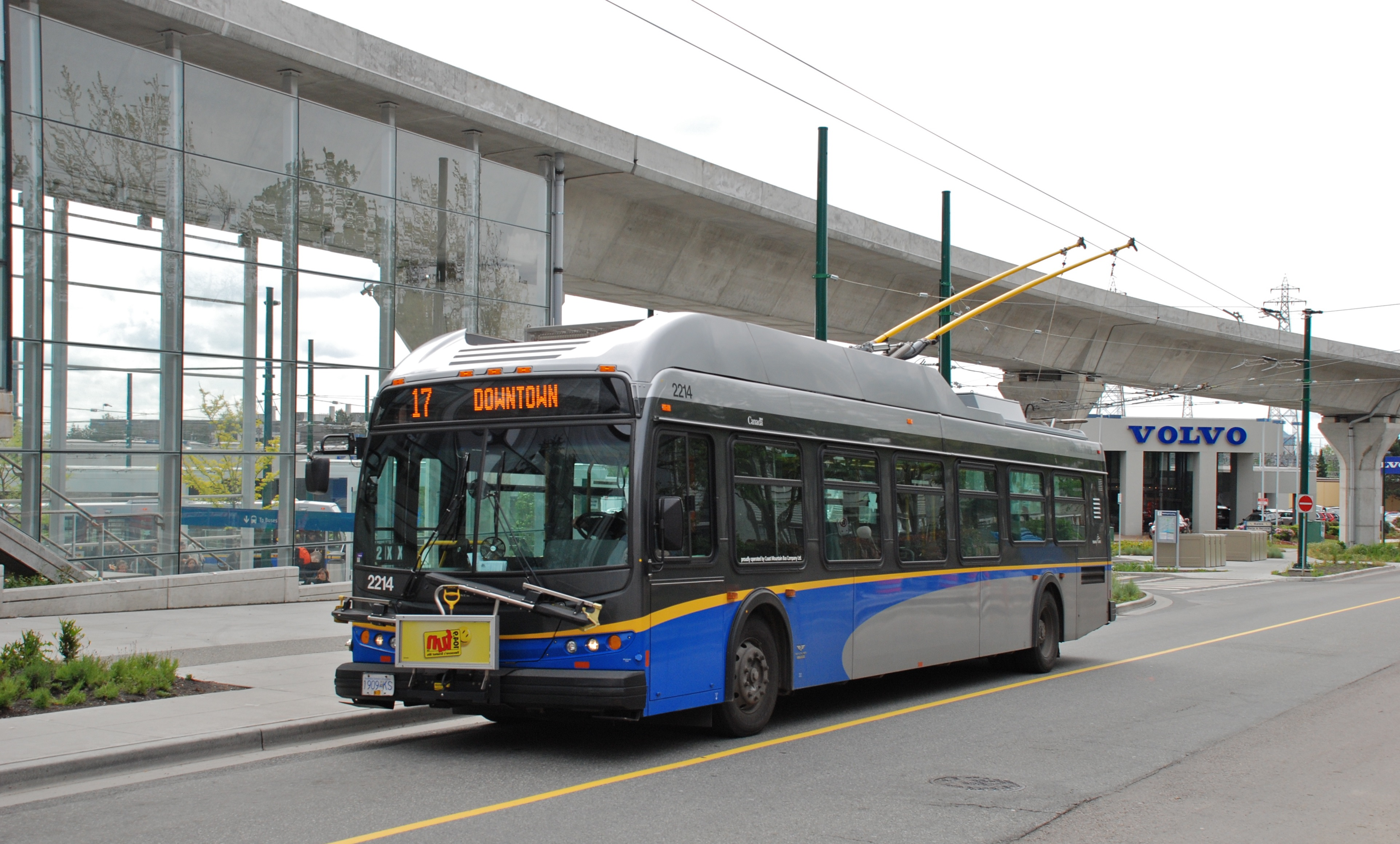
- New Flyer E40LFR at Marine Drive station

Operation
- Locale: Vancouver, British Columbia, Canada
- Open: 16 August 1948; 78 years ago
- Routes: 13 (list of routes)
- Operators: British Columbia Electric Railway (1948–1962); BC Hydro (1962–1973); Greater Vancouver Transit System (1973–1978); Urban Transit Authority (1978–1982); BC Transit (1982–1999); Coast Mountain Bus Company (since 1999)

Infrastructure
- Electrification: Parallel overhead lines, 600 V DC
- Depot: Vancouver Transit Centre

Statistics
- Route length: 315 km (195.7 mi)
- Daily ridership: More than 100,000
- Website: Official website

The Vancouver trolley bus system forms part of the TransLink public transport network serving Metro Vancouver in the Canadian province of British Columbia. Opened in 1948, the system was originally owned and operated by the British Columbia Electric Railway. By 1954, Vancouver had the largest trolley bus fleet in Canada, with 327 units, and the fleet grew to an all-time peak of 352 in early 1957. There were 19 routes by 1955 and a peak of 20 by the second quarter of 1957. The last route to open in the 1950s was the only express trolley bus service that ever existed in Canada. Several, mostly short, extensions to the system were constructed in the 1980s and later.

The trolley bus system presently comprises 13 routes and is managed by the Coast Mountain Bus Company, a subsidiary of TransLink. It uses a fleet of 262 trolley buses, of which 74 are articulated vehicles. It has the second-largest trolley bus fleet in Canada and the U.S.

== History ==
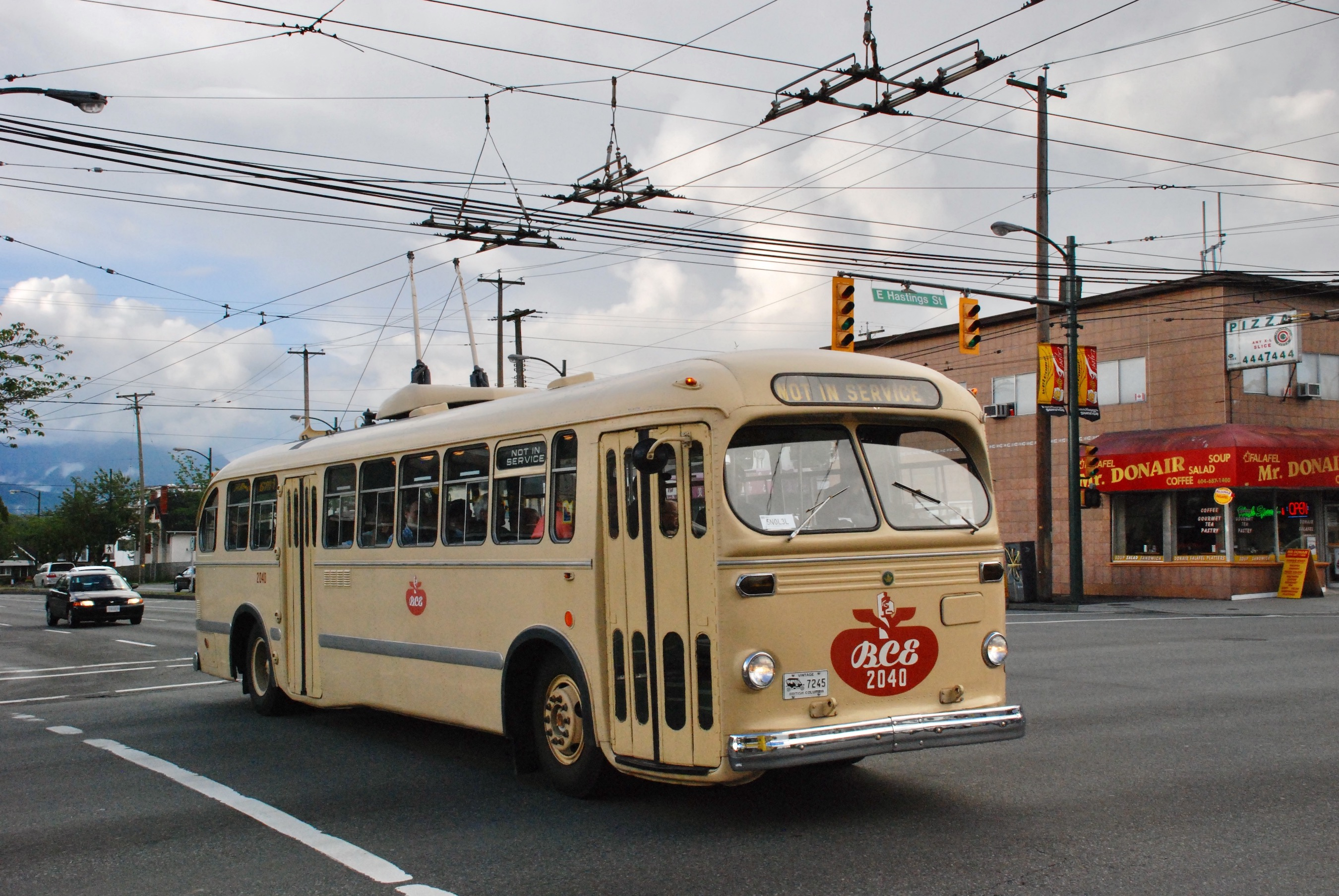
Preserved 1947 CCF–Brill T44 No. 2040

Following a formal opening ceremony on 13 August 1948, regular service on Vancouver's first trolley bus routes began on 16 August 1948, operated by the British Columbia Electric Railway (BCER). Two routes opened on that day, 6 Fraser and 15 Cambie, and routes 5 Robson and 8 Davie followed later the same year. All of these first routes had been conversions of streetcar lines except for the Cambie route. Conversion of several more streetcar and motor bus routes quickly followed, and by 1953, the trolley bus system had 16 routes. Three more trolley bus lines were created in 1955, when the last streetcar line, Hastings, closed and was replaced by the 14 Hastings trolley bus route and two branches, routes 16 Renfrew and 24 Nanaimo. In May 1957, BCER introduced an express trolley bus route, 34 Hastings Express (which had first been created as a diesel bus route, one year earlier), which was the only express trolley bus service in Canada. For that service, a 5.2-kilometre-long (3.2 mi) section of East Hastings Street, between Main Street and Kootenay Loop, was equipped with two additional sets of overhead wires for use by express trips only, and trolley buses ran non-stop in both directions along that section. The addition of route 34 brought the network to what was, for several years, its maximum extent, with the following 21 routes (all of which were designated by route names, rather than destinations, and numbers):

- 3 Main
- 4 W. Fourth
- 5 Robson
- 6 Fraser
- 7 Dunbar
- 8 Davie
- 9 Broadway
- 10 Tenth
- 11 Stanley Park
- 12 Powell
- 14 Hastings
- 15 Cambie
- 16 Renfrew
- 17 Oak
- 18 Arbutus
- 19 Kingsway
- 20 Granville
- 24 Nanaimo
- 25 Victoria
- 34 Hastings Express
- 41 41st Avenue

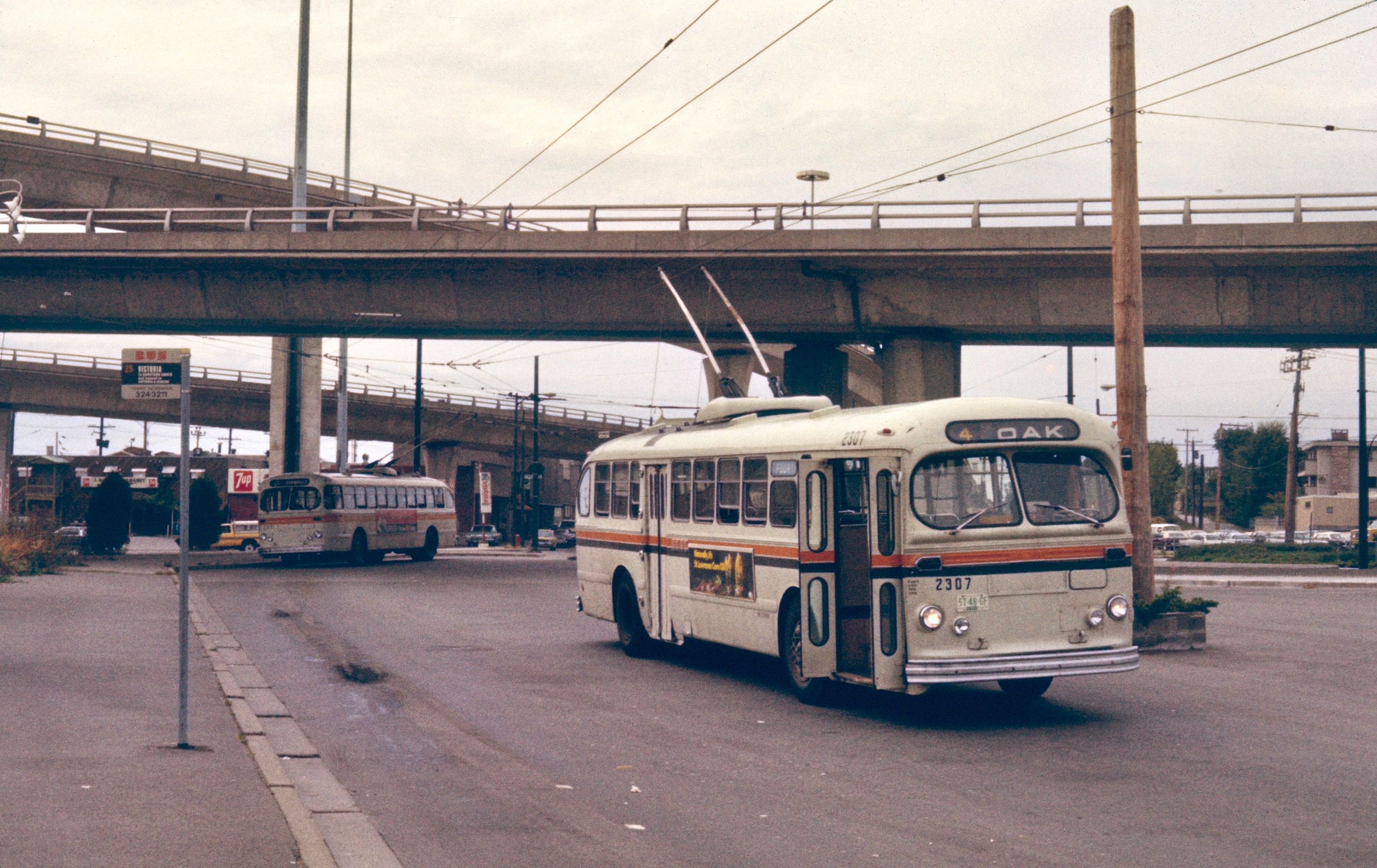
Two 1951 CCF–Brill T48 trolley buses at Marpole Loop in 1981

The service was provided by CCF–Brill trolley buses, with 82 model T44 vehicles acquired in 1947 and 1948, and 245 of the larger model T48 (and variants T48A and T48SP) acquired between 1949 and 1954. With the delivery of the last new Brill trolley bus, in January 1954, Vancouver had the largest trolley bus fleet in Canada at 327 units. The fleet later included 25 1947-built Pullman-Standard trolley buses acquired secondhand from Birmingham, Alabama, which entered service in March 1957. However, drivers considered the Pullmans awkward to operate, and the vehicles were found to be surplus to the company's needs; they were taken out of service in 1960 and scrapped in 1961. The BC government nationalized BCER in August 1961, replacing it with a new crown corporation named BC Hydro.

=== 1970s to 1990s ===
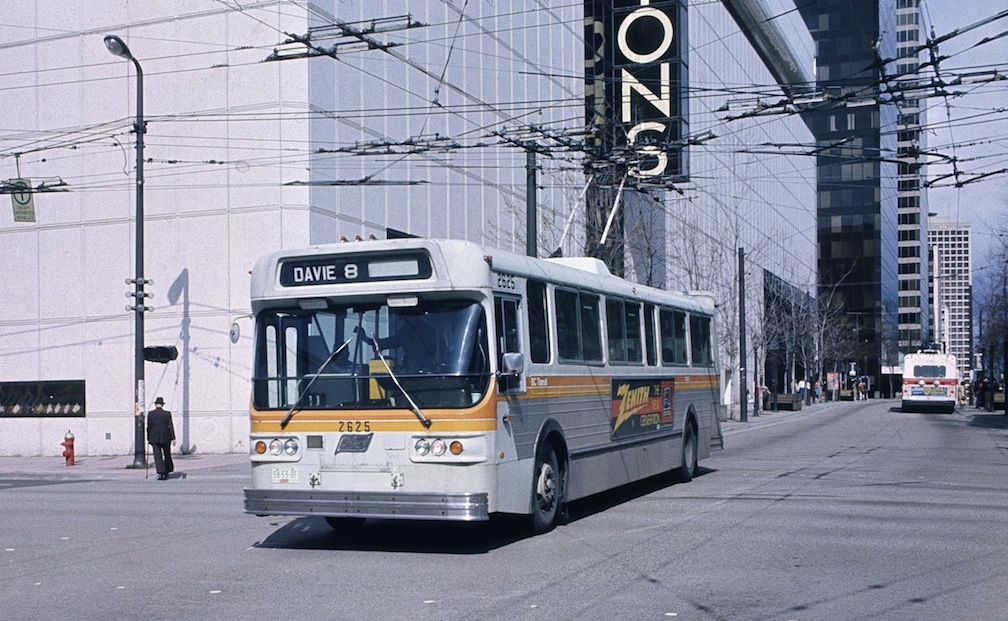
One of the 50 Flyer E800 vehicles, built between 1975 and 1976 but equipped with recycled propulsion equipment

In November 1974, trolley buses began operating along the new Granville Mall in downtown Vancouver, after a section of Granville Street was converted into a bus- and pedestrian-only street. During the work to convert the street to a transit mall, all trolley bus routes had been detoured via Seymour, Howe, and Richards streets.

In the mid-1970s, the remaining T44-model trolley buses were retired, and in their place 50 new trolley buses were acquired from Flyer Industries. Vancouver's Flyer model E800s were new vehicles except for the propulsion system, which used recycled General Electric equipment from the earlier Brill T-44s. The Flyer E800s were delivered in late 1975 and 1976. Their use of recycled 1940s electrical equipment resulted in a shorter lifespan, and they were withdrawn in 1985, but around 25 returned to service for Expo 86, and the last few were in occasional service until January 1987.

In the early 1980s, the system acquired 245 new Flyer E901A/E902 trolley buses. These began to enter service in mid-1982, gradually replacing the CCF–Brill vehicles. The last use of a Brill trolley bus in service occurred on 25 March 1984. After withdrawal of the last E800s, in early 1987, Flyer E901A/E902 vehicles made up the whole of the Vancouver trolley bus fleet for almost 20 years. E902 No. 2937 was irreparably damaged by an electrical fire in 1987, reducing the total number of trolley buses to 244.

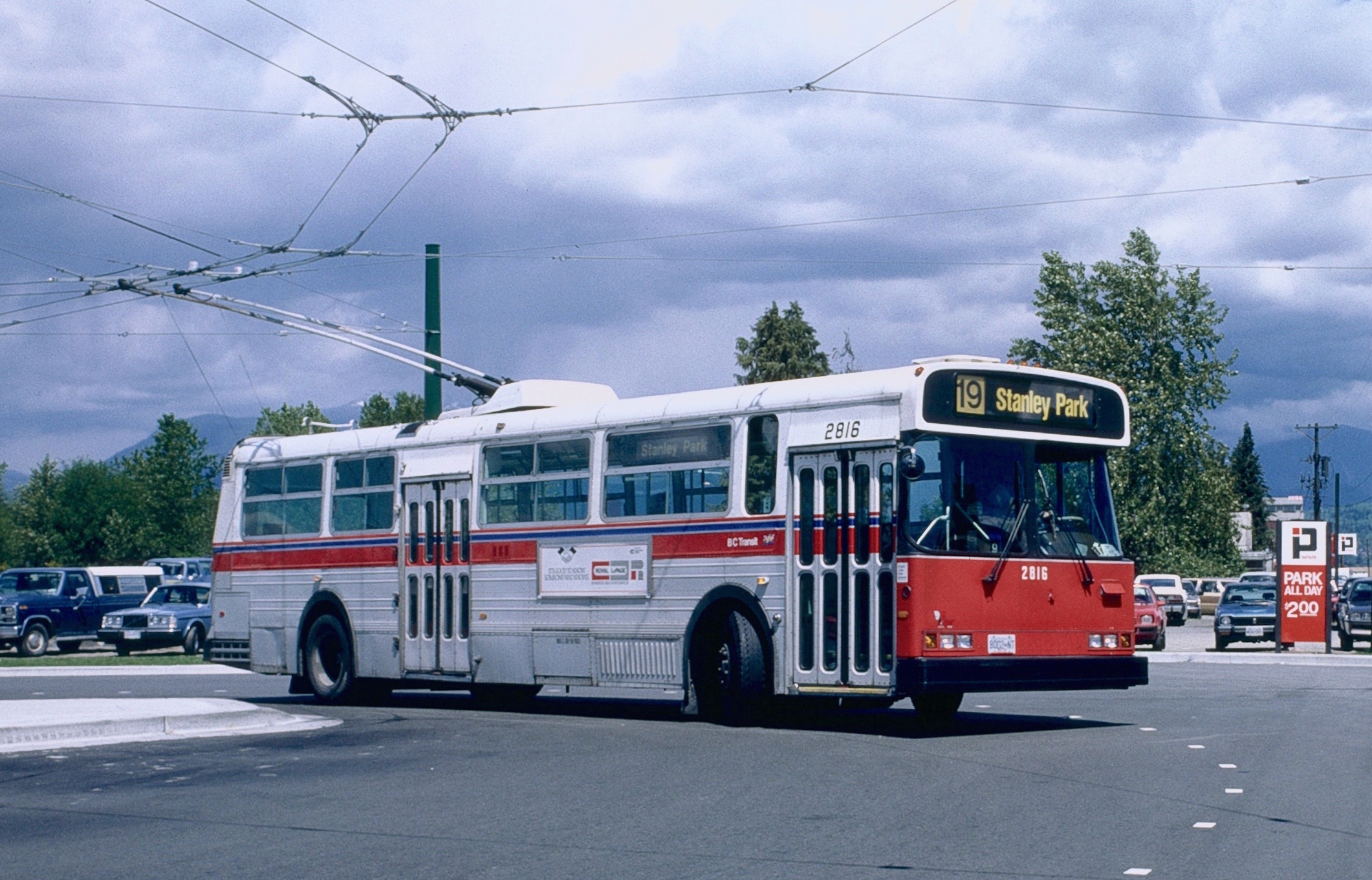
One of the new Flyer E902 vehicles at Metrotown station in 1986, before the Metrotown Centre shopping mall was built above the transit centre

In April 1983, route 34 Hastings Express was converted to diesel buses, ending – for a time – the only express trolley bus service in Canada. The change was a result of route 34's through-routing partner – the route with which it was linked in downtown – being changed from the Arbutus route (then still numbered 18) to route 10 Tenth/UBC, which had been converted to diesel buses in 1968 upon being extended to the University of British Columbia (UBC) because there were no overhead wires to UBC at that time. Use of the "express wires" thereby ended, except by trolley buses heading to the garage from Kootenay Loop. In September 1988, when the opening of an extension of the overhead wires to UBC enabled route 10 Tenth to be reconverted to trolley buses, the Hastings Express service – renumbered from 34 to 10 in 1986 – also became trolley bus-operated again, after a 5.5-year absence. Express trolley bus service ended for a second time on 12 April 1997, with that half of route 10 replaced by new express bus routes running beyond Kootenay Loop, the end of the wires. Although no longer scheduled for use, the express wires were kept in place and would see occasional use by very late-running trolleys on route 14 Hastings attempting to regain lost time. (On the now-closed Edmonton trolley bus system, two sets of express wires were installed in 1983 on a 2-kilometre (1.2 mi) section of 102 Avenue and Stony Plain Road, for a planned conversion of bus route 10 to trolley buses, but that conversion never took place and the express wires were never brought into scheduled use; Vancouver's express trolley bus service remained unique in Canada.)

Several extensions to the system were constructed and opened in 1986, in connection with the opening of the SkyTrain rapid transit system. Most were short diversions of routes at their outer ends, to terminate at new SkyTrain stations, including Nanaimo station, 29th Avenue station and Joyce station, but the extension of route 19 Kingsway to Metrotown was 5 kilometres (3.0 mi) long and was the first extension of Vancouver's trolley bus system outside the city of Vancouver, into Burnaby. An extension from Blanca Street to UBC opened in September 1988, bringing trolley bus service back to routes 10 and the Hastings Express.

=== 2000 to present ===
In September 2003, trolley bus route 19 Kingsway was extended to a new terminus within Stanley Park, using 0.80 kilometres (0.5 mi) of new wires. Earlier, starting in 1950, route 11 Stanley Park was a trolley bus route, but the terminus known by that name was located outside the park, in an off-street turning loop off of Georgia Street at Chilco Street, overlooking Lost Lagoon. Route 11 became through-routed with route 19 Kingsway in 1986 and was renumbered 19. In December 1993, route 19 was cut back to Burrard Street in downtown on weekdays (with a diesel shuttle covering the section to Stanley Park loop) and converted to diesel buses on weekends, after the unsignalized left turn into the terminal loop was deemed to be too hazardous in weekday traffic conditions. The old loop continued to be used by diesel buses on weekends, and its trolley wires also remained in place for some years and were occasionally used by trolley buses during special events, such as a 1998 excursion marking the system's 50th anniversary, but in 2002, the loop was closed even for motor buses and removed. The 2003 extension brought trolley buses back to the section of Georgia Street to, and now past, the location of the former loop and into Stanley Park, to a bus loop constructed around 2002.

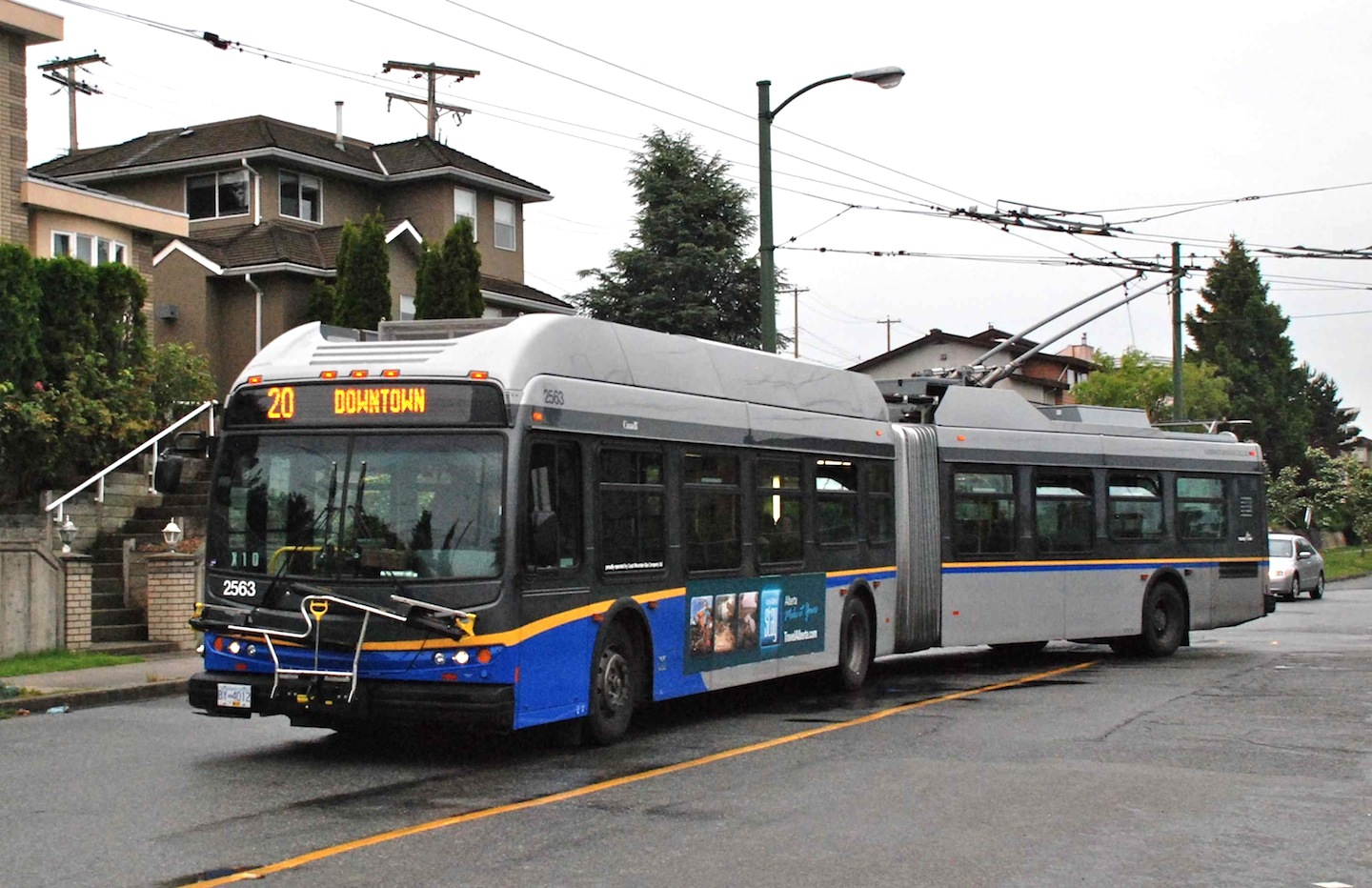
The fleet renewal between 2005 and 2009 included, for the first time, some articulated vehicles.

From 2005 to 2009, the fleet was renewed again. New Flyer Industries in Winnipeg won the contract for the supply of the new vehicles, with electrical equipment by the German company Vossloh Kiepe. Aside from a prototype received in 2005, delivery of the new trolley buses began in August 2006, and they began to enter service on 5 October 2006. The last day of service for the Flyer E901A/E902 vehicles was 18 April 2008. In December 2008, 80 of the old Flyers were sold to the Mendoza trolley bus system in Argentina. Vancouver now had a fleet of 262 low-floor trolley buses, supplied under the New Flyer contract between 2005 and the end of 2009.

With the opening of the SkyTrain's Canada Line, routes 3 Main, 10 Granville, and 17 Oak were extended to Marine Drive station on 7 September 2009, using new overhead wires installed along a 2.2-kilometre (1.4 mi) section of Marine Drive between Oak Street and Main Street. Prior to this change, routes 10 and 17 had terminated at Marpole Loop and route 3 at Main and Marine. (The three routes were later temporarily cut back to their former terminals during construction of a large housing and commercial complex at Marine Drive station, from February 2013 for route 10, from April 2014 for the others, until April 2015.)

In June 2020, route 41 was reconverted to trolley bus operation. The route had been changed to being primarily a diesel bus route in the mid-1970s, when it was extended – without overhead trolley wires – from 41st Avenue and Crown Street to UBC. A few rush hour trips had continued to use trolley buses until September 2000, after which its overhead wires remained in place but were not used for any service. The 2020 return to trolley bus operation involved cutting the route back to terminate at Crown Street, with service between there and UBC Exchange being provided by the R4 41st Ave express bus route.

== Services ==
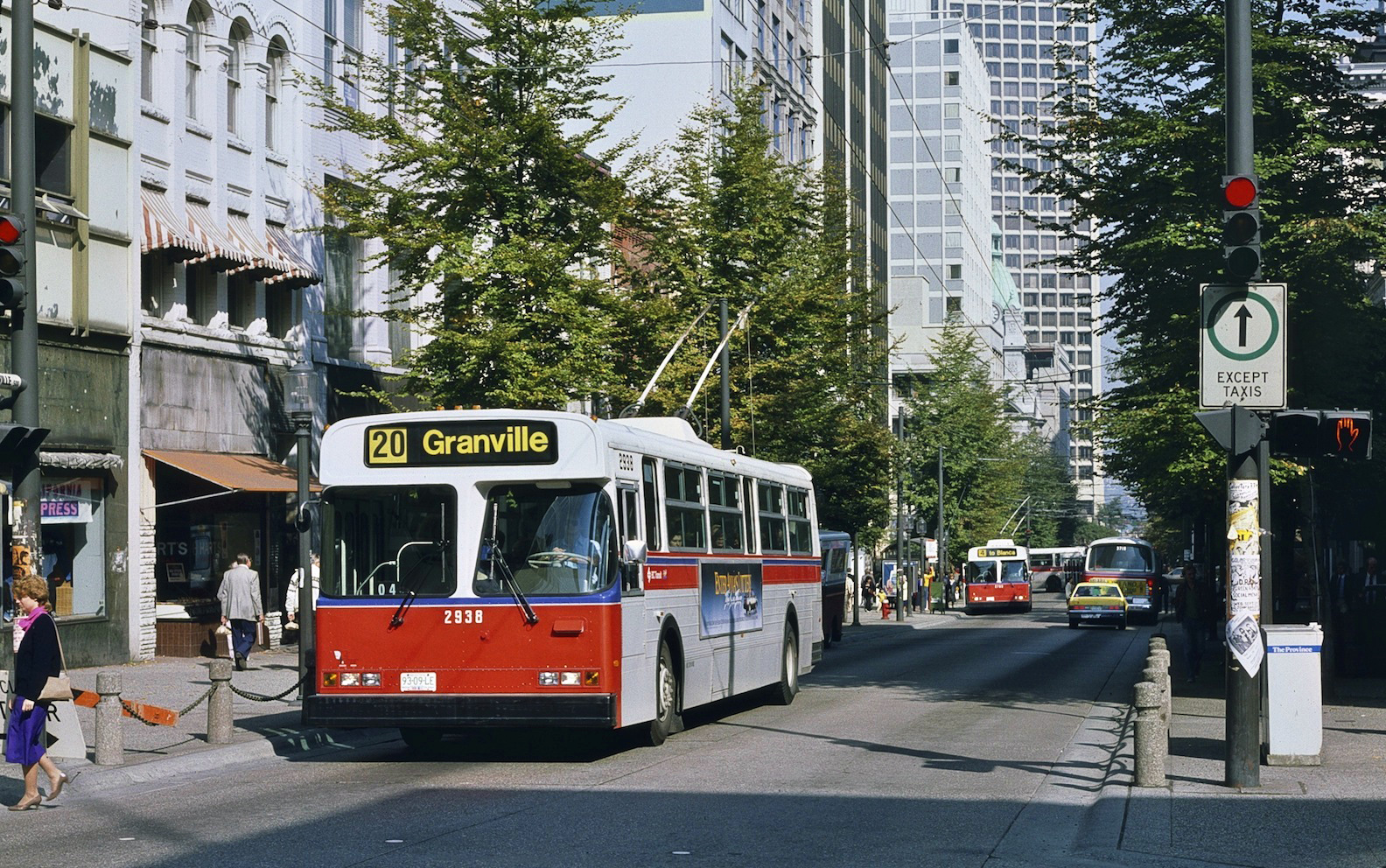
Flyer E902 trolley bus on the Granville Mall in 1985

=== Routes ===
As of 2024, the 13 routes that make up the Vancouver trolley bus system are:

- 3 Downtown – Main / Marine Drive Station
- 4 UBC – Downtown/Powell (runs UBC – Downtown only after 8 p.m.)
- 5 Downtown – Robson
- 6 Downtown – Davie
- 7 Dunbar – Downtown – Nanaimo Station
- 8 Downtown – Fraser
- 10 Downtown – Granville
- 14 UBC – Downtown/Hastings (runs UBC – Downtown only after 6:30 p.m.)
- 16 Arbutus – Downtown / 29th Avenue Station
- 17 Downtown – Oak
- 19 Stanley Park – Metrotown Station (via Kingsway)
- 20 Downtown – Victoria
- 41 41st Avenue – Crown – Joyce Station

=== Temporarily suspended ===
- 9 Alma – Boundary (via Broadway); scheduled to reopen upon completion of the Millennium Line Broadway extension

=== Former routes ===
(Not including routes simply renumbered)

- 13 Cambie – Downtown (a.k.a. Expo 86 shuttle – temporary route supplementing route 15 during the Expo 86 world's fair; introduced on 2 May 1986, running from downtown along Cambie Street to 49th Avenue originally, but shortened to 29th Avenue in mid-June; discontinued on 13 October 1986)
- 15 Cambie – Downtown (trolley service discontinued September 2005 for Canada Line construction)
- 34 Hastings Express (10 Hastings Express for its last nine years as a trolley route; discontinued April 1997)

== Fleet ==
As of 2026, Vancouver's fleet of trolley buses, is made up of the following types:

Fleet numbers	Quantity	Year built	Manufacturer	Model	Length	Type	Image
2101–2199, 2201–2288	187	2005–2007	New Flyer	E40LFR	12 m (40 ft)	Low-floor	
2501–2574	74	2006–2009	New Flyer	E60LFR	18 m (60 ft)	Low-floor, articulated	
27001	1	2026	Solaris	Trollino 12	12 m (40 ft)	Low-floor, prototype	
28201	1	2026	Solaris	Trollino 18	18 m (60 ft)	Low-floor, articulated, prototype	An articulated trolleybus with a pair of yellow and white poles pulled down and stowed. The bus is painted in blue with a yellow stripe following along the bottom of the windows and slanted down towards the front. The bus has a bicycle rack on the front that is folded down and a large destination sign displaying the words "NIS TRAINING" in all caps.
On order
27002–27107	(106)	2027	Solaris	Trollino 12	12 m (40 ft)	Low-floor	
28202–28277	(76)	(2027–2028)	Solaris	Trollino 18	18 m (60 ft)	Low-floor, articulated	

The original order for the Flyer trolley buses, placed in late 2003, was for 188 conventional and 40 articulated buses. The first, a model E40LF, was delivered in July 2005, and the rest of the 12-metre (40 ft) vehicles, later designated E40LFR, were delivered between August 2006 and September 2007.

The first articulated arrived in Vancouver in January 2007. TransLink decided to order an additional 34 articulated units, making the total 74, and delivery of the 73 production-series E60LFR units took place between October 2007 and the fourth quarter of 2009.

=== 2020s fleet replacement ===
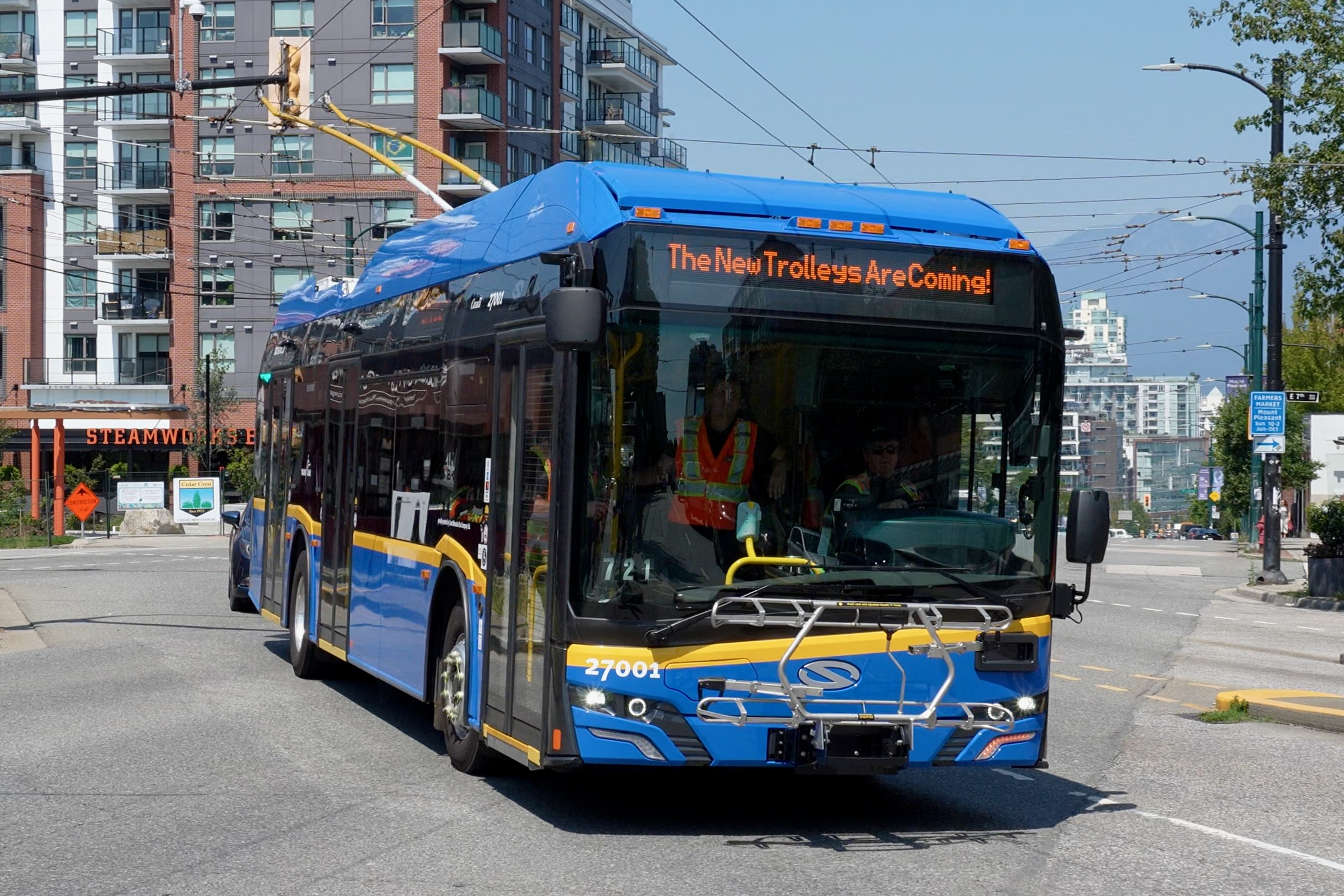
TransLink's Solaris Trollino 12 prototype being tested in Vancouver, in July 2026

In January 2022, TransLink published a report in which it was concluded that the existing fleet of New Flyer trolleys were nearing the end of their lifespan and announced its intentions to replace its existing fleet by 2027. Instead of replacing the trolleys with battery-electric buses, TransLink will purchase newer trolley buses to continue to make use of the catenary infrastructure. In August 2023, coinciding with the 75th anniversary of the Vancouver trolley bus system, TransLink tested a Trollino 12 trolley bus from Polish manufacturer Solaris. This test was the first time a Solaris vehicle had operated in North America and represented part of the company's plans to expand into the continent's market.

A scale illustration of TransLink's Solaris Trollino 12

In March 2025, TransLink announced that Solaris would be the supplier of the replacement trolley bus fleet. Their initial order consists of 107 12-metre (40 ft) Trollino 12 buses, with options for an additional 201 Trollino 12 buses and 204 18-metre (60 ft) Trollino 18 buses, though the short-term focus of the order is to replace the existing 262-bus fleet. The new buses will have air conditioning and batteries allowing them to travel up to 20 kilometres (12 mi) off-wire, features that are not present in the existing trolley bus fleet. The longer articulated buses will be equipped with a powered middle axle.

== Preservation ==
Three of Vancouver's trolley buses and one former trolley bus that was converted to diesel running have been preserved by the Transit Museum Society. The operational ones see occasional use for special events and on enthusiast fan trips. Several Brill trolley buses are stored in the ghost town of Sandon awaiting restoration. The Sandon buses were acquired from the former fleets of Vancouver, Calgary, Saskatoon, and Regina.

Year	Builder	Model	Preserved	Image	Notes
1947	CCF–Brill	T44	2040		Restored to operating condition and made its first public excursion as a historic vehicle in August 1996, after having been cosmetically restored (including to BC Electric livery) in 1983.
1954	CCF–Brill	T48A	2416		Restored as a historic vehicle, repainted into BC Hydro livery, and made its first trip (without passengers) on 13 August 1988, in honour of the system's 40th anniversary – the first trip by a Brill trolley bus in Vancouver since the retirement of the last Brills in March 1984. It later began operating occasional public excursions.
1976	Flyer	E800	2649		Preserved 2649 was converted into a diesel bus in 1987 but retained its trolley poles for winter wire-de-icing duty. It was renumbered 3151 at that time, and the trolley poles were only carried from November to March each year. It was renumbered again, as V1109, after being retired from service as a diesel bus in the 1990s. It was one of 49 E800s converted into diesel buses in 1987–1990, the first being no. 2650 (as bus 5199), but one of only two to retain their trolley poles for de-icing (3152, previously 2645, being the other).
1983	Flyer	E902	2805		Not operable; stripped of most of its electrical components by thieves in 2010

== Garages ==
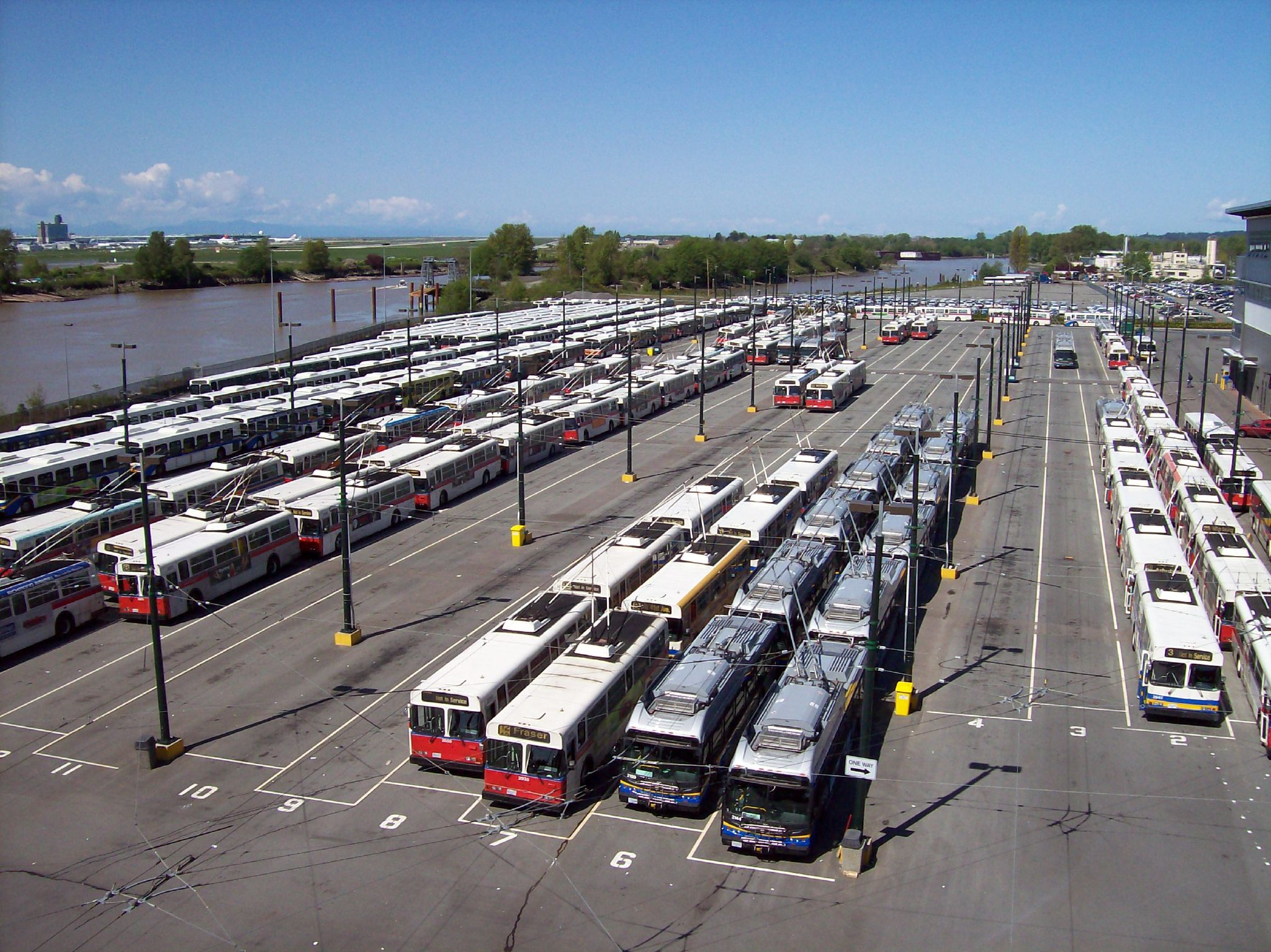
The main yard of Vancouver Transit Centre, the system's garage, in 2007

=== Former ===
Originally, and for 58 years, the trolley bus fleet was maintained and based at Oakridge Transit Centre, (Note: Transit centre is the term used locally to refer to bus garages, differing from the common meaning of that term.) located on West 41st Avenue just east of Oak Street. It opened in August 1948, shortly before the inauguration of the first trolley bus service. In 2003, TransLink announced plans to build a new garage in the Marpole neighbourhood, about 3.5 kilometres (2.2 mi) south of the Oakridge garage it was to replace. The new site was larger, 7.1 hectares (17.5 acres) compared to 5.7 hectares (14 acres). The Oakridge garage closed as an active garage at the end of the 3 September 2006 service day, and its replacement opened the next day. TransLink continued to allow storage of preserved vehicles of the Transit Museum Society (TraMS) at the Oakridge site, and its workshops also remained in operation for some time for use by technicians from New Flyer and Kiepe Electric who were inspecting and preparing for service the new trolley buses that were still being delivered at that time. Work to dismantle most of the overhead wires at the former garage began in February 2011, prior to the planned sale of the property for redevelopment, and the last two TraMS vehicles left in October 2012. The overhead wire maintenance department remained based at the site until 2016, and the property was put up for sale later that year.

=== Existing ===
Since 2006, the entire active trolley bus fleet has been based at the Vancouver Transit Centre, a large trolley and motor bus garage in the city's Marpole neighbourhood. Construction began in the first quarter of 2004, and it opened for regular operations on 4 September 2006, with space for 417 vehicles. The garage's capacity for trolley buses was expanded in 2009 to accommodate an increase in the size of the trolley bus fleet to 262 vehicles from 228 in mid-2008. Starting in the fourth quarter of 2009, it had capacity for around 240 diesel buses and 262 trolley buses and was one of the largest bus garages in North America.

== See also ==
- List of bus routes in Greater Vancouver
- List of trolley bus systems in Canada
