= Filipino Plaza =

Landscaped park in Vancouver, British Columbia

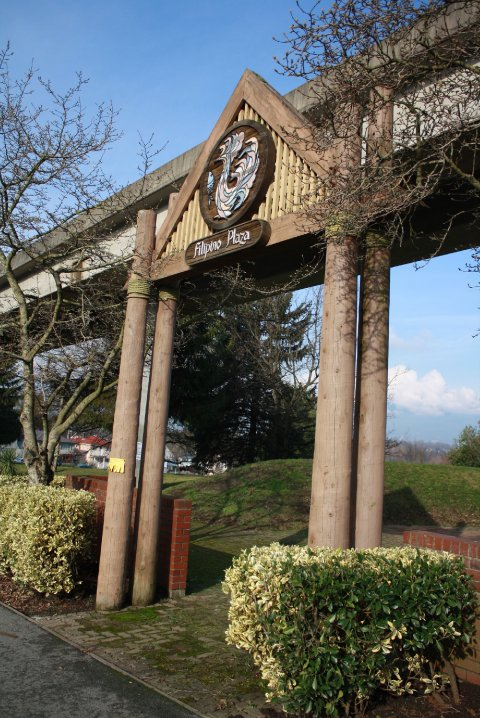
- Interactive map of Filipino Plaza
- Type: Public Park
- Location: Vancouver, British Columbia
- Coordinates: 49.2497°N 123.0581°W
- Created: 1986

Filipino Plaza is a landscaped park located on Vanness Avenue, west of SkyTrain's Nanaimo Station in the city of Vancouver, British Columbia, Canada. The open park, sometimes referred to as a linear park, is located underneath the SkyTrain Expo Line, and was one of the dozens of open parks built in 1986 as part of BC Transit's Parkway Program showcasing different cultural parks on the 26-kilometre path that parallels the SkyTrain. Many ethnic communities created legacies on the linear park under the Skytrain in 1986.

Designed by architect Bert Morelos, the park consists of a wooden arch, a very distinctive and colourful Sarimanok logo, and two walls made up of 2,000 red bricks donated by Filipino-Canadians representing the pioneers of the plaza.

Construction of the park was made possible with the bayanihan spirit of Filipino-Canadian members of the "Filipino Plaza Committee of 1985." The designer of the Sarimanok logo and the park itself was Filipino. The committee led the effort of the many Filipino in raising enough money for the plaza.

In 2010, a Filipino Plaza Committee was formed to handle proposed improvements.
