= Joyce–Collingwood station =

Metro Vancouver SkyTrain station

Joyce–Collingwood
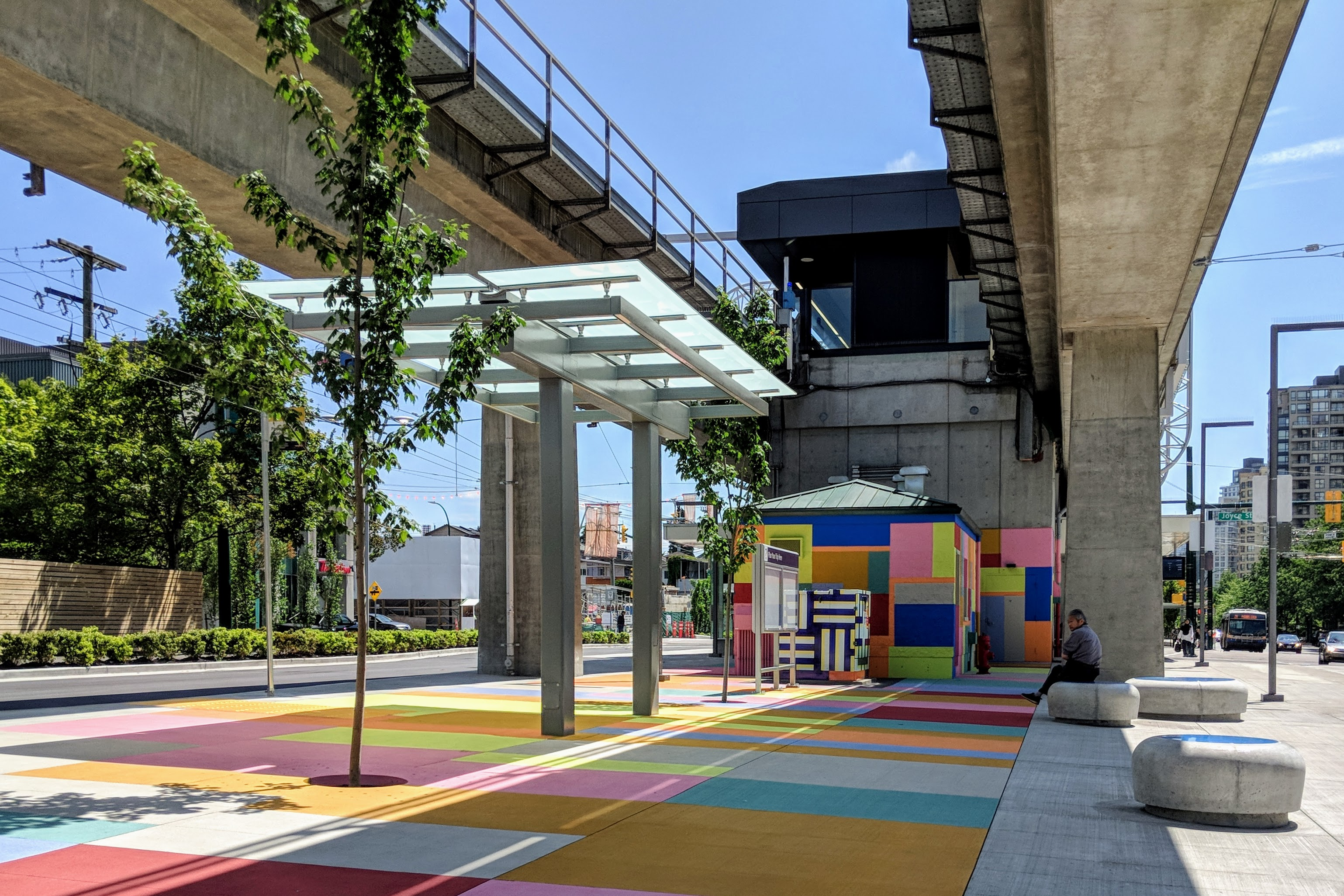
- Joyce–Collingwood's bus drop-off area

General information
- Location: 5099 Joyce Street, Vancouver
- Coordinates: 49.23835°N 123.031704°W
- System: SkyTrain station
- Owner: TransLink
- Platforms: Centre platform
- Tracks: 2
- Connections: R4 41st Ave

Construction
- Structure type: Elevated
- Accessible: yes
- Architect: Architektengruppe U-Bahn

Other information
- Station code: JY
- Fare zone: 1

History
- Opened: December 11, 1985; 40 years ago
- Rebuilt: 2016–2019; 7 years ago
- Former names: Joyce (1985–2001)

Passengers
- 2025: 4,994,000 ▼2.3%
- Rank: 7 of 54

Services
Preceding station	TransLink	Following station
29th Avenue towards Waterfront	Expo Line	Patterson towards King George or Production Way–University
Location

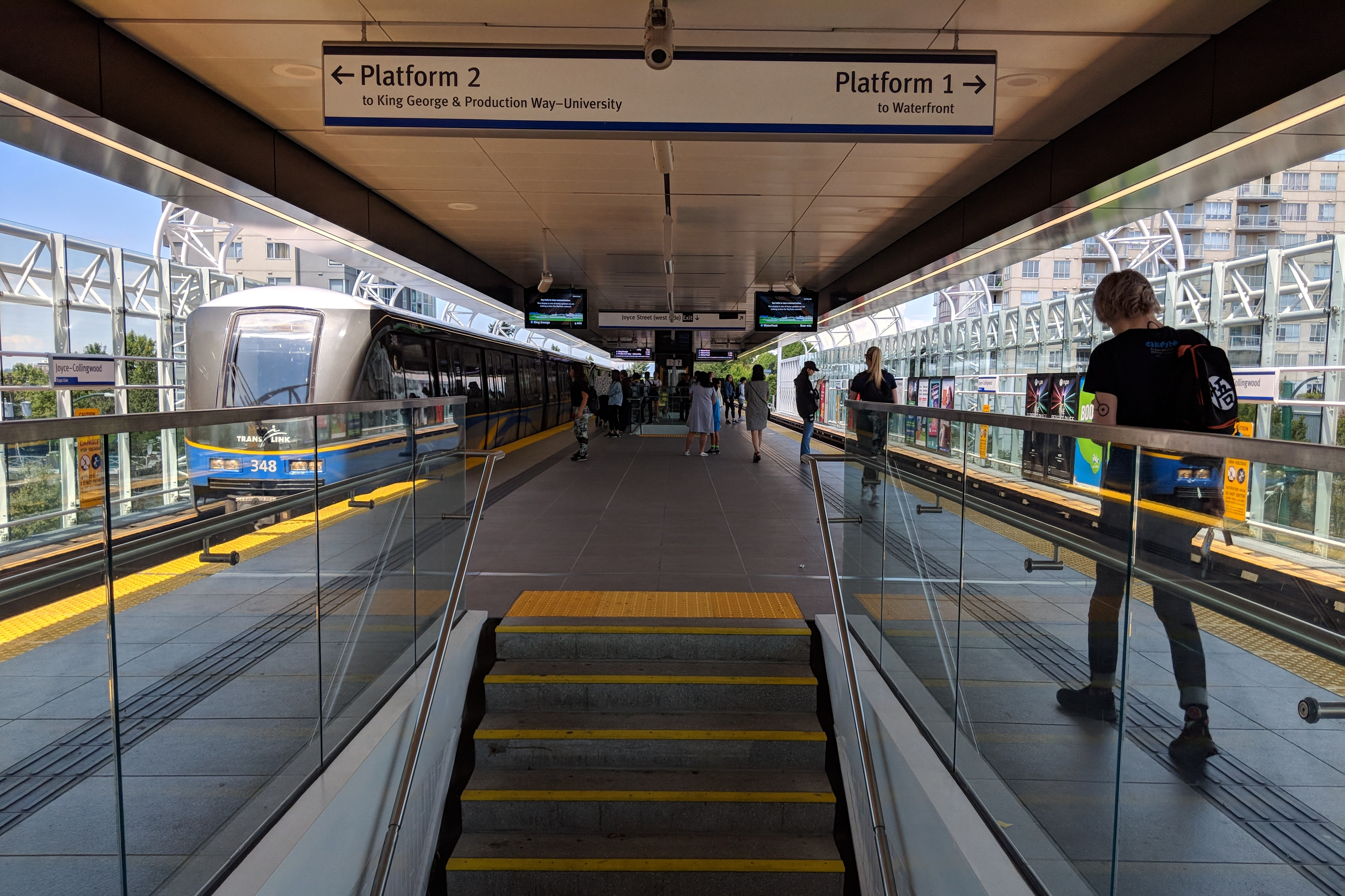
Platform level

Joyce–Collingwood (formerly Joyce) is an elevated station on the Expo Line, a part of Metro Vancouver's SkyTrain rapid transit system. The station is located on Joyce Street at Vanness Avenue, in the Renfrew–Collingwood neighbourhood of Vancouver, British Columbia, Canada.

== History ==
The station was designed by the Austrian architecture firm Architektengruppe U-Bahn and opened in 1985 as "Joyce station" on the original Expo Line. It replaced Joyce Loop, located 600 metres (2,000 ft) south at the intersection of Joyce Street and Kingsway, as the main transfer point for local transit services in the area. Trolley wires were extended to the station in early 1986 to bring trolley buses to the station's bus loop.

The station is located on the former right-of-way once used by the British Columbia Electric Railway's Central Park Line; this line ran from just west of Nanaimo station to where New Westminster station is located.

Formerly an industrial area, the immediate vicinity of this station has since been redeveloped as Collingwood Village, a denser community of high-rise condominiums. The "Collingwood" portion of the name was added in 2001 in an attempt to reflect the positive impact of SkyTrain on the surrounding community.

As part of Expo Line upgrades, renovations on the station began in early 2016. Phase one of the project was completed on October 6, 2017; it included a replacement of the existing elevator, the installation of two new escalators at the east end of the platform to replace the original single one, and the improvement of the station design and integration with the surrounding community. Phase two renovations began in early 2018 and were completed on June 15, 2019.

== Services ==
- The station connects to a number of TransLink bus routes serving eastern Vancouver, Burnaby, and North Vancouver.
- It is one of the termini for the R4 41st Ave RapidBus service, which replaced the 43 express route that ran west from this station to the University of British Columbia on January 6, 2020.

== Station information ==
=== Entrances ===
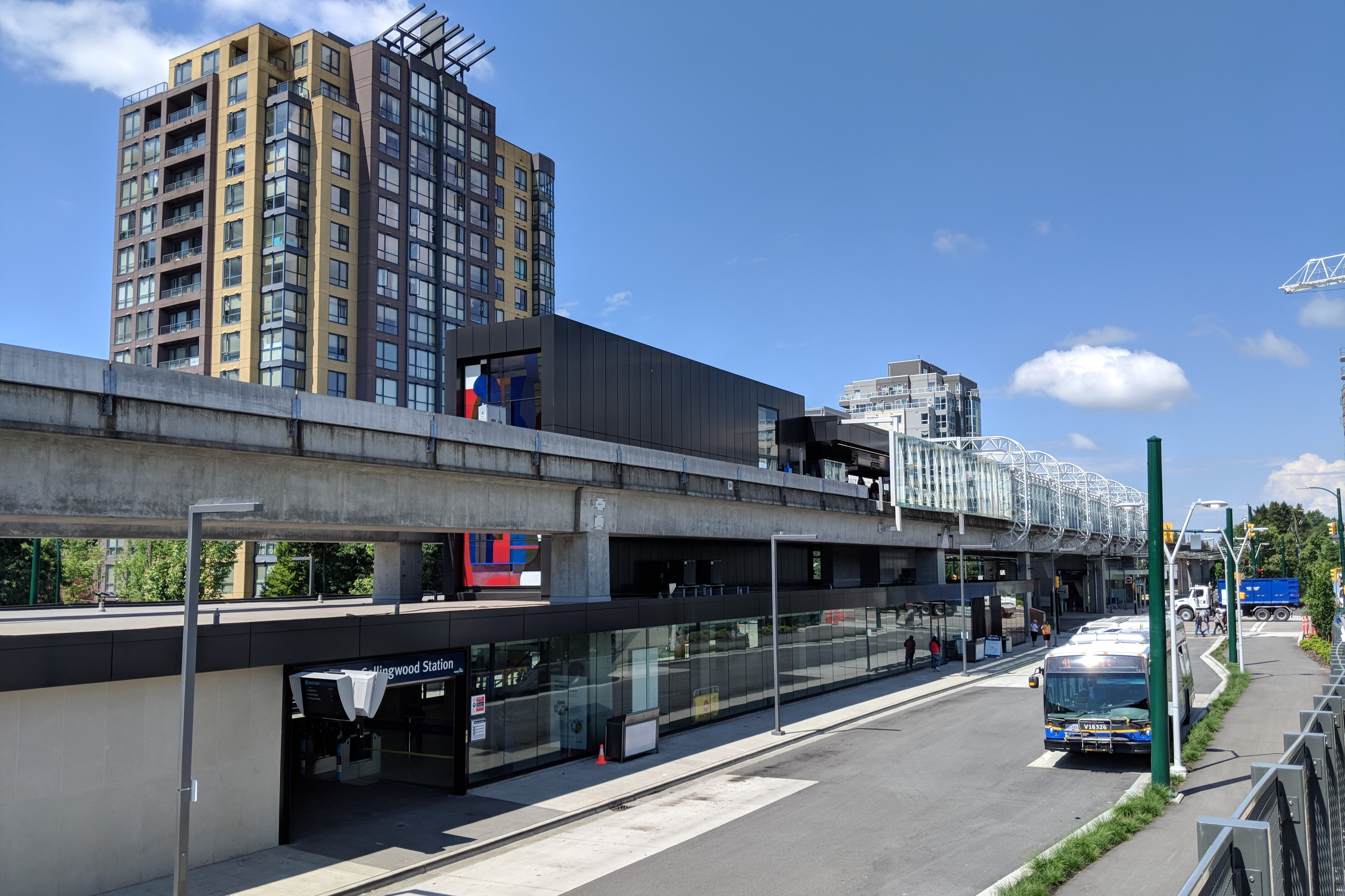
Bus loop and east stationhouse

- West entrance: located on the west side of Joyce Street, in the centre of the bus loop. The entrance is fully accessible with an elevator and an up escalator.
- East entrance: located on the east side of Joyce Street, on the opposite side of the bus loop. The entrance is also fully accessible, including up and down escalators, an elevator, and a staircase. This entrance serves the passenger drop-off area.

=== Transit connections ===
Joyce–Collingwood station provides a partial off-street transit exchange at the intersection of Joyce Street and Vanness Avenue. Bus bay assignments are as follows:

Bay	Route	Destination	Notes
1	—	—	Unloading only
2	28	Phibbs Exchange	
3	—	—	HandyDART
4	R4	41st Ave	RapidBus service to UBC Exchange
5	41	Crown	Trolley bus service
6	26	29th Avenue Station	
7	27	Kootenay Loop	
