= Sir Guy Carleton Elementary School =

Public elementary school in Vancouver, British Columbia

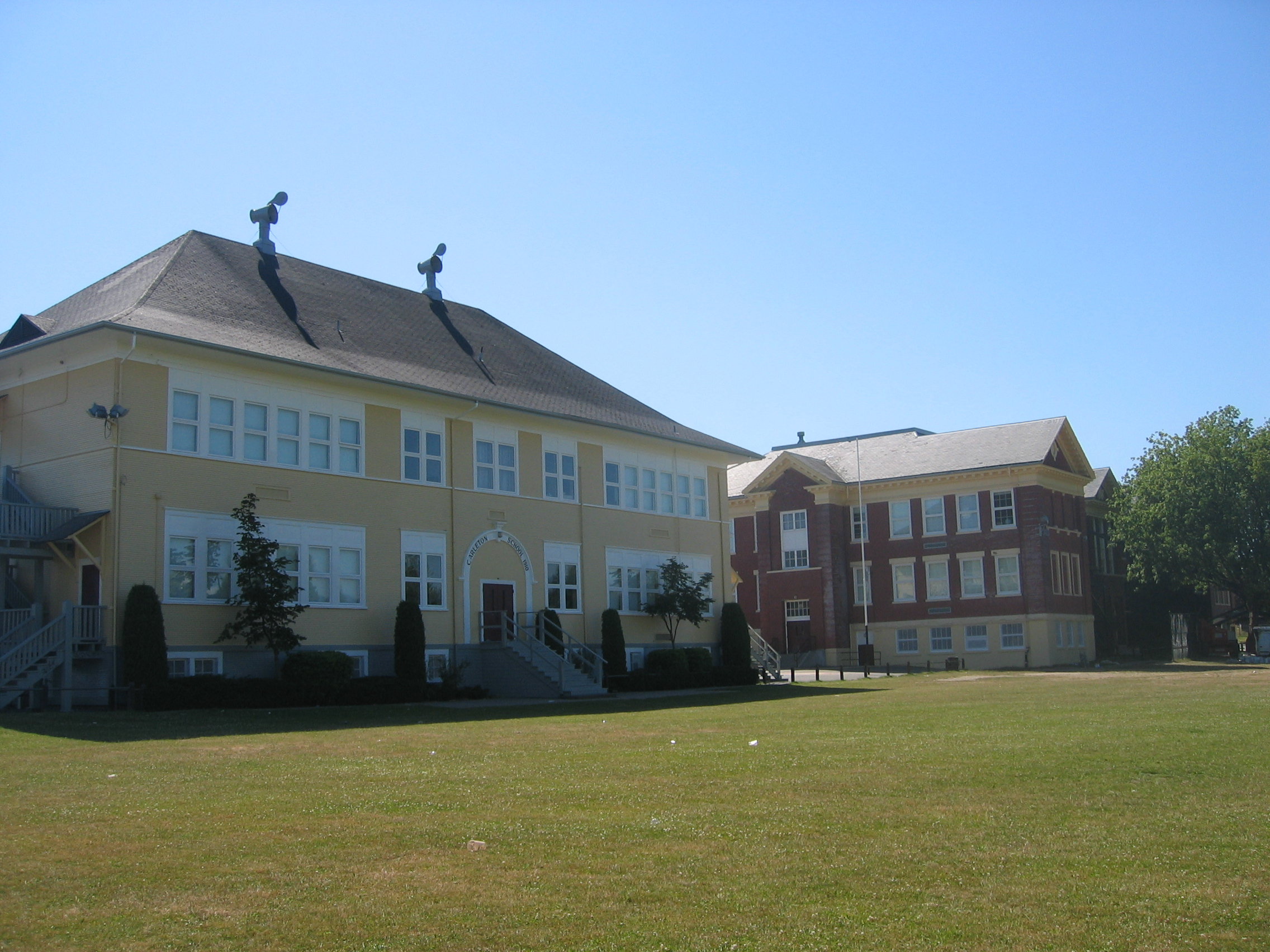
- The frame and brick buildings in 2006

Location
- 3250 Kingsway; Vancouver, British Columbia, V5R 5K5; Canada; 49°14′02″N 123°02′16″W

Information
- School type: Elementary school
- Founded: 1896
- School board: School District 39 Vancouver
- Area trustee: Victoria Jung
- School number: 03939030
- Principal: Adrienne Stewardson
- Grades: K–7
- Enrollment: 62 (in 2022, at Cunningham Elementary School)
- Capacity: 556
- Language: English
- Area: Renfrew-Collingwood
- Colours: Red and white
- Team name: Carleton Eagles

Sir Guy Carleton Elementary School, often shortened to Carleton School or Carleton, is an elementary school located at the southern periphery of the Renfrew-Collingwood neighbourhood of Vancouver, British Columbia, Canada. It is part of the Vancouver School District.

Founded as Vancouver East School in 1896, it is the oldest school in the city. It was renamed Collingwood Heights School in 1908, following the completion of the wooden "frame building" the year prior. The school took its present name, named for Guy Carleton, 1st Baron Dorchester, in 1911, when construction on the main "brick building" began.

The school has had a turbulent history since the late 2000s; it was the site of two major fires and a murder, and the Vancouver School Board (VSB) has proposed to close down the school four times. Green Thumb Theatre, a local children's theatre company, leased the original schoolhouse (Carleton Hall) in 2011 to prevent its closure and demolition.

== Description ==
The schoolgrounds are located at the southwest intersection of Kingsway and Joyce Street. It is the oldest school in Vancouver and its buildings include the city's oldest two-room schoolhouse, the city's only one-room schoolhouse, a two-storey Edwardian-style building (colloquially the "frame building"), and the brick-faced Carleton School No. 4 building (colloquially the "brick building"). The municipal government lists the original schoolhouse as a "Category A" heritage building in its Vancouver Heritage Register.

== History ==
=== Early history ===
The school was established in 1896 as the Vancouver East School. It began as a two-room schoolhouse (named Carleton Hall in 1911) and accommodated all 30 students living in the Collingwood neighbourhood. Many of the streets around the school came to be named after the students. For example, Battiston Street is named after the Battison brothers and Earles Street is named after Florence Earle. Joyce Street, a major road which the school sits on, is named after the first school board secretary, A. Joyce.

As the population of Collingwood grew in the early 20th century, the school expanded to accommodate more students. A one-room schoolhouse, the only ever built in Vancouver, was added to the schoolgrounds in 1907, and the school was renamed Collingwood Heights School the following year with the completion of the frame building. The school took its present name of Sir Guy Carleton Elementary School in 1911, when construction on the brick building started. The brick building was completed the next year.

King Edward VIII visited the school during his two-month tour of Canada in 1919, when he was the Prince of Wales. He arrived at 11 am on September 29 and was greeted by a large audience that included 5,500 schoolchildren from the wider area. He stayed for 20 minutes and spoke briefly in front of the brick building.

=== 2008 schoolhouse fire ===
Firefighters responded to a fire at the original schoolhouse on March 2, 2008, at around 12:30 am. Callers initially reported a dumpster fire on schoolgrounds, but firefighters quickly determined that a fire had begun on the front porch of the schoolhouse and spread to its attic. Firefighters classified the blaze as a two-alarm fire. The fire was contained by 2:30 am, but the last of its embers in the attic were not put out until 4 am. Firefighters knocked several holes in the roof to put out the fire; the roof was charred but did not collapse. The schoolhouse as a whole suffered significant smoke and water damage. An investigation later determined that the fire had been started by arsonists; the perpetrators have never been caught. The two kindergarten classes that were taught in the schoolhouse were temporarily relocated to the brick building.

The VSB planned to demolish the damaged building in mid-2010, but the decision was put on hold after Green Thumb Theatre proposed that it restore then lease the building instead. Green Thumb Theatre initially estimated that the project would cost CA$750,000, but the number eventually rose to CA$1.2 million. In October 2011, Green Thumb Theatre entered an agreement with the VSB to lease the damaged schoolhouse and an adjacent building (colloquially the "barn") for 20 years. Green Thumb Theatre applied for a CA$150,000 cultural infrastructure grant from the City of Vancouver to replace the roof and a $450,000 grant from the Department of Canadian Heritage to further mitigate costs. Adrian Dix, the local Member of the Legislative Assembly (MLA) for Vancouver-Kingsway at the time and who had previously campaigned against the closure of Carleton, personally donated CA$1,000 to the project. Restoration work was completed on June 6, 2013, with the schoolhouse housing two rehearsal studios and the "barn" housing the administrative office of Green Thumb Theatre.

=== 2009 murder of Michael Ciro Nestoruk ===
On April 9, 2009, at approximately 7:30 am, the body of 41-year-old Michael Ciro Nestoruk was discovered on schoolgrounds by parents dropping off their children for class. Vancouver police determined that it was a homicide. Nestoruk was a homeless man who used a wheelchair after falling from the roof of Carleton at the age of 15. The fall caused serious injuries requiring multiple surgeries and the amputation of his left leg. Nestoruk took prescription painkillers to ease the pain from his injuries; his usage escalated into a lifelong battle with drug addiction.

Vancouver police announced on April 16, 2014, that Aaron Dale Power had been arrested and charged with the murder of Nestoruk. Power, who was 32 years old at the time, admitted to having struck Nestoruk on the head twice with a rock and concealing his body in the bushes, where it was found the morning after. The pair had been doing drugs at a nearby motel, but a dispute over drugs and money led Power to later confront Nestoruk at Carleton. Power pleaded not guilty to the charge of second-degree murder on February 6, 2017. The Supreme Court of British Columbia, however, found him guilty of the charge ten months later in December 2017, and Power was sentenced to life in prison with no eligibility of parole for 12 years.

=== 2010 proposed closure ===
In September 2010, the VSB announced their intention to close down five elementary schools, including Carleton, as a consequence of budget shortfalls. The closures would have saved the VSB an estimated CA$1.5 million in annual operating costs; at the time, the VSB was facing an CA$18-million deficit. The announcement was met with significant protest from parents, students, and staff. The VSB suspended the planned closures after public consultations with affected communities.

=== 2016 proposed closure ===
In June 2016, the VSB announced their intention to close down 12 schools, including Carleton, to save an annual CA$7.7 million in operating costs. The VSB also announced that the frame building would be closed for the 2016–17 school year to immediately cut costs. The announcements were met with significant protest, and the VSB debated suspending its planned closures once again. The elected trustees of the VSB were evenly split on the decision, but the sudden medical leave of several VSB staff members in October prompted the VSB to suspend its plans indefinitely.

=== 2016 brick building fire ===
On August 19, 2016, at around 7:15 pm, a fire began on the third floor of the brick building and quickly spread to the attic, where it was contained by firefighters. It was classified as a four-alarm fire. In 2021, the estimated cost to repair the fire damage was over $500,000, and would need to be funded from the BC Ministry of Education's capital plan.

Following the fire, Carleton students and staff were moved to Cunningham Elementary School, located approximately 1.8 kilometres northwest from Carleton. At the time of the fire, 308 students were enrolled at Carleton. Although Cunningham had sufficient capacity to accommodate all 308 students, many students chose to move to other schools instead. As of 2022, Carleton operates as a separate entity within the buildings of Cunningham, and the joined schools are referred to as "Carleton Cunningham Elementary School".

=== 2019–2022 developments ===
In February 2019, the VSB released a draft of their long-term facilities plan, which named 28 schools, including Carleton, that the board considered as possible future closures, due to low-enrollment numbers or a need for seismic upgrades which the board could not afford. The Vancouver Project Office Steering Committee, consisting of senior staff from the BC Ministry of Education and the VSB, determined there was no feasible business case for the seismic upgrading of Carleton that could be advanced to the ministry for consideration. The combined cost for the building's restoration from the fire damage and seismic upgrade was estimated to be $36 million. The VSB therefore opted to focus on finding alternate uses for the site to justify a future closure of Carleton. However, due to the VSB's inability to develop a feasible business case that could be advanced to the Vancouver municipal project office for consideration, there have been no further developments since the release of the draft.

The VSB's May 2022 "planning strategy report" for schools in southeast Vancouver described the condition of Carleton's buildings as "poor".

Although Carleton has the capacity to support up to 556 students, only 80 students were enrolled in 2021 as part of the combination school of "Carleton Cunningham", with the VSB estimating the number to further decrease. In 2022, the number of students dropped to 62.

In January 2023, the Vancouver School Board redrew the catchment area for Sir Guy Carleton Elementary so that it included only the school's property footprint, following a consultation that consisted of one focus group with 11 participants, an online session with 18 attendees, and 12 survey responses.

=== 2023 proposed closure ===
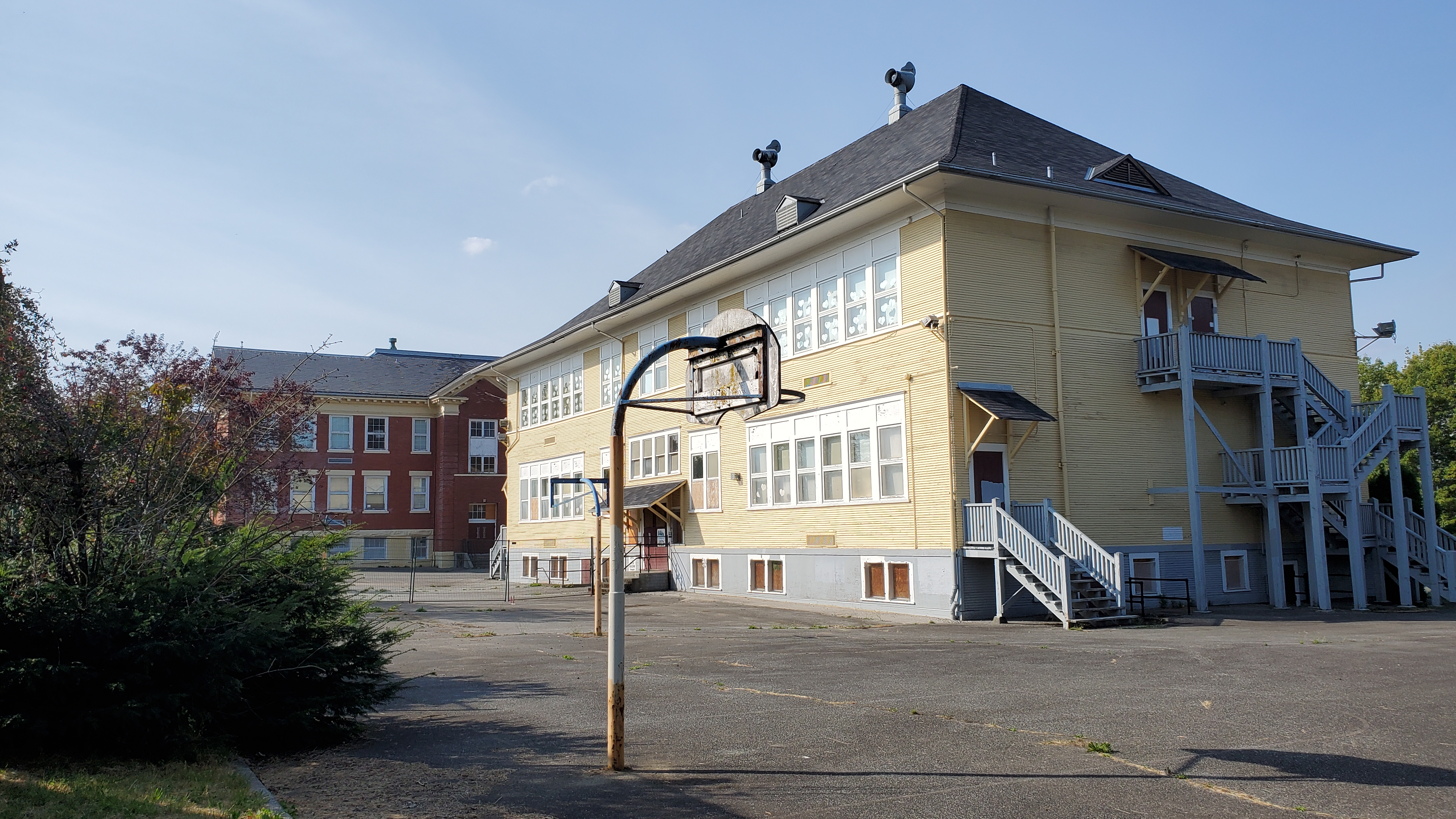
The main buildings in 2023

In June 2023, the VSB released a staff report that recommended school trustees once again consider closing down Carleton. Reasons cited included a projected further decrease in student enrolment, as well as the unaffordable cost of seismic upgrades and repairs due to the 2016 fire and vandalism in the previous seven years.

In a VSB Facilities Planning Meeting on June 7, 2023, it was noted: "The Carleton site presents potential opportunities for alternate community use and capital revenue generation for the Board. Some of these opportunities can only be realized through a long-term lease of the site or fee simple sale of a portion of the site which require a site surplus declaration by the Board. Permanent school closure is a necessary precursor to consideration of site surplus declaration by the Board."

=== 2025 proposed closure ===
In 2025, the VSB again proposed the closure of Carleton. The VSB's Rationale for Closure cited enrollment projections derived from the “Baragar Plus Local Knowledge” methodology, despite the district's own planning reports indicating that regional data from Metro Vancouver provides a more reliable basis for long-term forecasting.

Parent groups questioned the accuracy of these projections and the timing of the proposal, noting that the school had been partially closed since a 2016 fire and that the Board had not yet released an updated Long-Range Facilities Plan (LRFP). Public consultations were held in the fall of 2025, during which parents urged that the decision be postponed until the updated LRFP was made public.

In parallel with the closure proposal, the City of Vancouver listed the Carleton site under subdivision application SD-2022-00071, which sought to divide the property into multiple parcels for potential redevelopment.

Media coverage in October and November 2025 drew attention to community concerns about transparency, school capacity, and the redevelopment of school lands. Reports appeared in multiple outlets including the Vancouver Sun, The Tyee, CTV News, CityNews, Radio-Canada, BCIT News, Fairchild TV, and the Buzzsprout Podcast.

== Closure and community response ==
On December 17, 2025, the Vancouver School Board voted 5–3 to formally close Carleton. The school was formally closed for student enrolment on December 19, 2025.

Following the closure decision, many volunteers from the Joyce–Collingwood community continued to advocate for the retention of the school site for public education and community use. Community actions included the display of more than 500 red hearts on signs in the area representing families seeking access to neighbourhood public schooling, the continuing collection of over 2,200 petition signatures from local residents, and the distribution of approximately 800 informational flyers throughout the neighbourhood and community meetings.

Residents also raised concerns regarding potential subdivision planning for the school site, citing a lack of public consultation and alignment with long-term planning frameworks, including the Joyce–Collingwood Station Precinct Plan and the City of Vancouver's Vancouver Plan.

== Notable alumni ==
- Michael Baldisimo, Major League Soccer player
