= Renfrew–Collingwood =

Coordinates: 49.2425°N 123.0466°W

- Neighbourhood
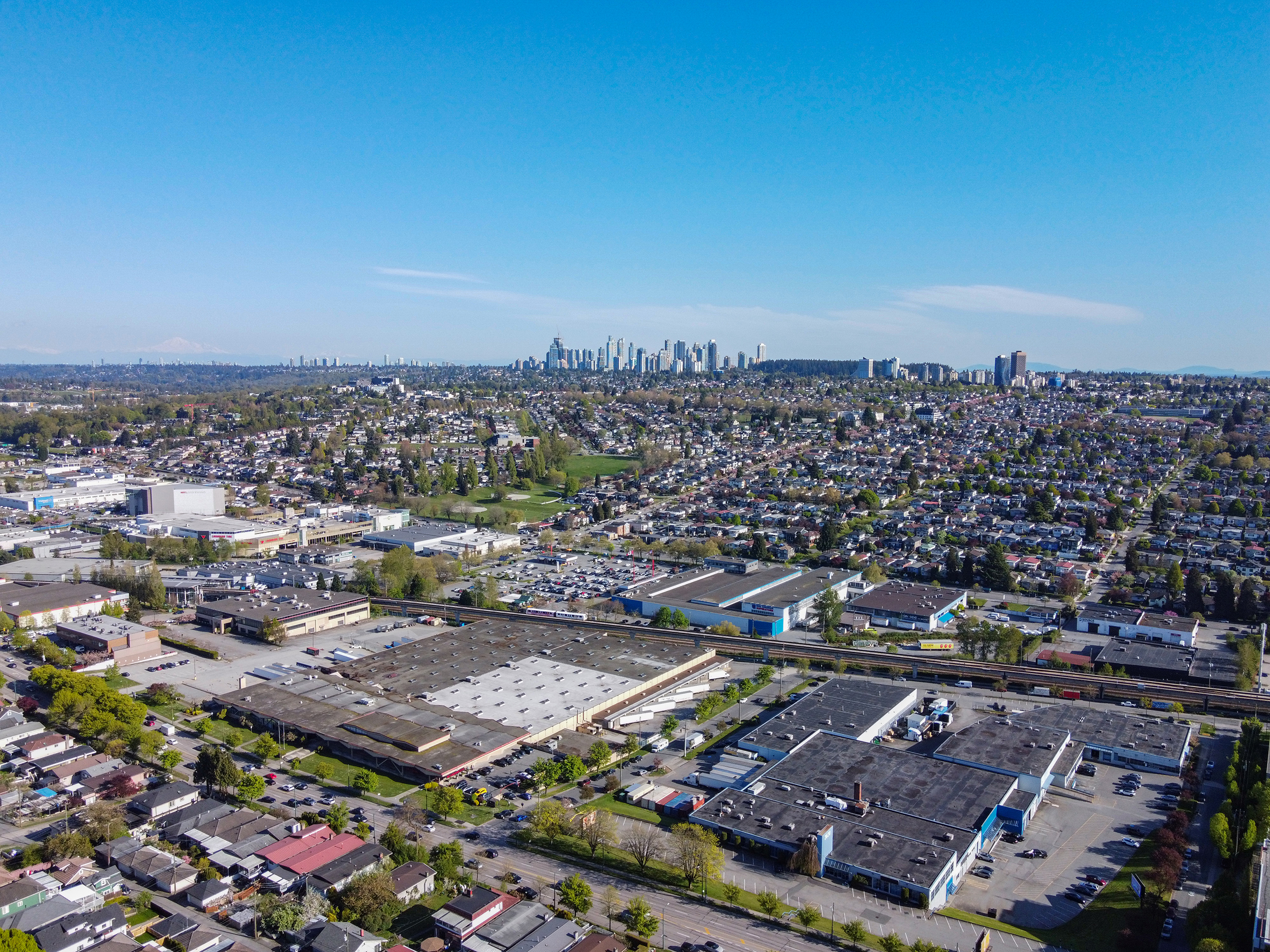
- Renfrew Heights aerial view in 2026

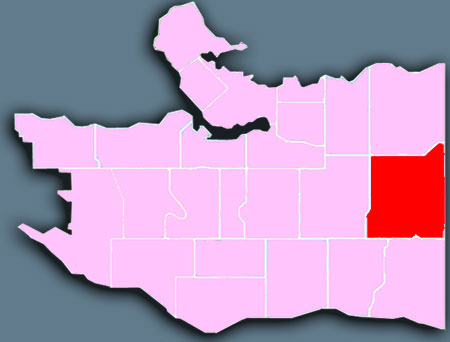
- Location of Renfrew-Collingwood in Vancouver.

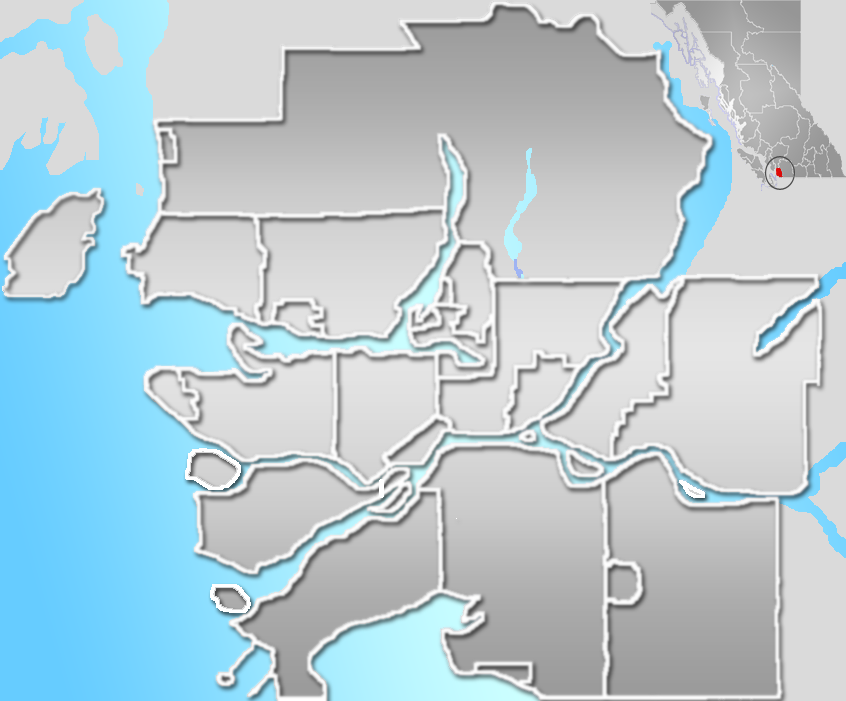
- Location in Vancouver
- Country: Canada
- Province: British Columbia
- City: Vancouver

Area
  - Total: 8.05 km^{2} (3.11 sq mi)

Population (2016)
  - Total: 51,530
  - Density: 6,401/km^{2} (16,580/sq mi)

Renfrew–Collingwood is a large neighbourhood that lies on the eastern side of Vancouver, British Columbia, Canada, on its boundary with Burnaby and encompassing an area that was one of the earlier developed regions of the city. It is a diverse area that includes a substantial business community in several areas, as well as some of the fastest-growing residential sectors of Vancouver. In 2011, the neighbourhood had a population of 50,500, 38.4% of whom claim Chinese as their first language.

== Geography ==
Renfrew–Collingwood is a large city neighbourhood, with an area of 8.2 km², that is bordered by Broadway to the north, East 41st Avenue to the south, Nanaimo Street to the west, and Boundary Road to the east. Kingsway runs through the southern part of the neighbourhood. Grandview Highway runs through the middle of Renfrew–Collingwood, carrying much of the traffic entering Vancouver from the Trans-Canada Highway during morning and evening rush hour. While much of the natural features of the area have been changed by recent development, portions of Still Creek continue to run through the area, which is built on rolling hills. The southeast corner of Renfrew–Collingwood near the intersection of Boundary Road is adjacent to Swangard Stadium and the northwest corner of Central Park.

- Collingwood – The streets of Collingwood (bordered by Clarendon on the west, Tyne on the east, Kingsway to the south, and 29th to the north) do not run north, south, east, or west; instead, the Streets run northeast/southwest and the Avenues run northwest/southeast. Plans from the City of Vancouver hopes to expand the Norquay Village into Vancouver's second town centre.

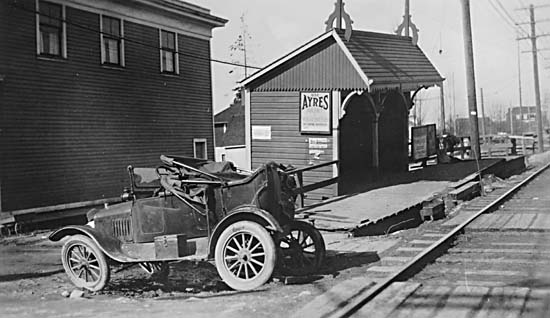
Collingwood Station, on the Central Park Line of BC Electric Rail in the 1930s (from the Vancouver Archives, document number CVA 677-386)

== History ==
In 1861, Colonel Richard Moody made the first modern attempt to break through the thick forests that covered the areas now known as Renfrew–Collingwood, building a military trail on the route of an ancient First Nations trail that led from New Westminster to English Bay. He then claimed 1.14 km² of land in the heart of the area, where the Collingwood commercial area now exists. The first settler in the area was George Wales, who moved to the area in 1878 and settled on an area bordered by Wales Street, Kingsway and East 45th Avenue.

By 1891, the interurban railway tram running along Vanness Avenue had opened the area to new residents, and a thriving community started near the junction of Vanness and Joyce Street. The name Collingwood was likely selected by some former residents of Collingwood, Ontario. However, another possibility is that the Collingwood name derives from Royal Navy Admiral Cuthbert Collingwood, for whom Collingwood Channel in Howe Sound is named. In 1913, a small town was growing quickly along Joyce Street. To the north, the Renfrew district—formerly the southern part of an area known as the Hastings townsite—began to see population arrive in the 1920s.

Over the years, the two areas have grown together, with extensive commercial development along Kingsway, Grandview Highway and Boundary Road and growing numbers of condominiums and multi-family residential developments sprouting up around the area. Construction of the two SkyTrain rapid transit lines through the area (the original Expo Line in 1986 and the more recent Millennium Line to the north) has brought even more interest in development.

The area had its beginnings and owes its name to a station on the now-defunct Central Park Line of the British Columbia Electric Railway, the route of which is now paralleled by the Skytrain line, the Joyce station of which is located on Joyce Street a few blocks north of Kingsway.

Collingwood Neighbourhood House on a winter's evening

== Demographics ==
Panethnic groups in the Renfrew–Collingwood neighbourhood (2001–2016)
Panethnic group	2016		2006		2001	
Panethnic group	Pop.	%	Pop.	%	Pop.	%
East Asian (Note: Statistic includes total responses of "Chinese", "Korean", and "Japanese" under visible minority section on census.)	22,865	44.64%	24,705	50.77%	22,545	50.34%
European (Note: Statistic includes all persons that did not make up part of a visible minority or an indigenous identity.)	10,460	20.42%	9,470	19.46%	10,085	22.52%
Southeast Asian (Note: Statistic includes total responses of "Filipino" and "Southeast Asian" under visible minority section on census.)	10,115	19.75%	7,520	15.45%	5,300	11.83%
South Asian	3,550	6.93%	3,495	7.18%	4,040	9.02%
Indigenous	870	1.7%	655	1.35%	640	1.43%
Latin American	770	1.5%	800	1.64%	575	1.28%
African	520	1.02%	410	0.84%	420	0.94%
Middle Eastern (Note: Statistic includes total responses of "West Asian" and "Arab" under visible minority section on census.)	365	0.71%	250	0.51%	130	0.29%
Other/Multiracial (Note: Statistic includes total responses of "Visible minority, n.i.e." and "Multiple visible minorities" under visible minority section on census.)	1,710	3.34%	1,350	2.77%	1,050	2.34%
Total responses	51,220	99.4%	48,660	99.54%	44,785	99.63%
Total population	51,530	100%	48,885	100%	44,950	100%
Note: Totals greater than 100% due to multiple origin responses

== Features ==
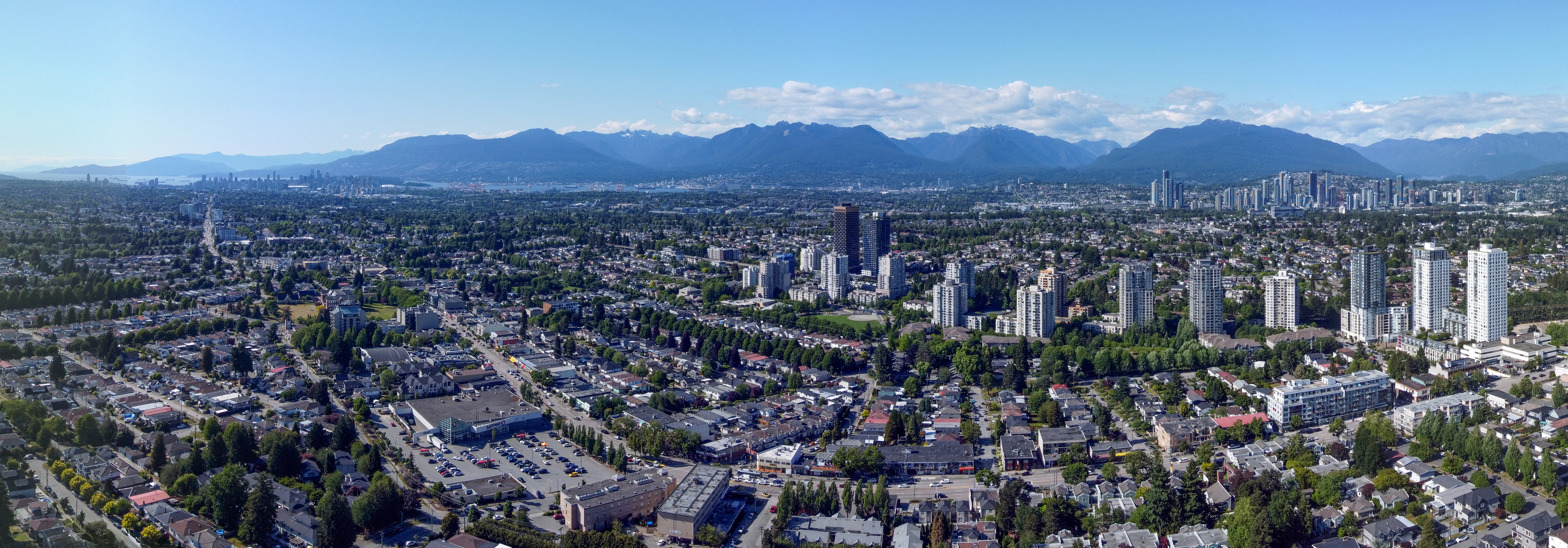
The view looking north from Kingsway (2026)

The wooded area around Still Creek has been preserved as Renfrew Ravine Park, and features walking trails, footbridges, and a meditation labyrinth. The neighbourhood features two public library branches (Collingwood and Renfrew), as well as a community centre and public pool at the Renfrew site. In addition, Collingwood Neighbourhood House, located at the Joyce Skytrain Station, offers programs for children and families. Norquay Park, Slocan Park and Renfrew Community Park all feature playgrounds and sports fields, and in recent years the Renfrew Ravine Moon Festival – a lantern festival – has taken place in Slocan and Renfrew Ravine parks in September. Graham Bruce, Grenfell, Carleton, Norquay, Nootka, and Renfrew are the public elementary schools in Renfrew–Collingwood; Windermere, and Vancouver Technical are its public high schools. Renfrew–Collingwood also features a private high school in the form of the Vancouver Formosa Academy, a school designed to meet the specific needs of students new to Canada. Finally, Renfrew–Collingwood features certain specialty stores which attract shoppers from across the Lower Mainland: at the corner of Kingsway and Earles, for example, the Purdy's Chocolate Factory sits across from Harvey's Appliances, and the site of the former Avalon Dairy is also nearby, just outside the Renfrew–Collingwood boundary at 43rd Avenue and Wales Street, where the original farmhouse still stands, bearing a heritage plaque.

Renfrew–Collingwood has seen a large amount of development in the past two decades, much of it coming thanks to the construction of the SkyTrain and its related stations. Three stations – Nanaimo, 29th Avenue and Joyce-Collingwood – were constructed on the 1986 Expo Line, while the Millennium Line brought the Renfrew and Rupert stations to the area. Joyce-Collingwood Station has turned into the centre of a booming residential area with condominium developments still being built around it; this area has encompassed the former Collingwood town centre, which continues to be a popular shopping area. To the north, Grandview Highway has drawn some large "big-box" stores and turned into an economic engine for that portion of the community. Also in that area is the busy Vancouver Film Studios operation.

Much of the heritage of both Renfrew and Collingwood has been pushed aside by progress and redevelopment, but certain heritage sites still remain in place. The Carleton Elementary School, at the southwest corner of Kingsway and Joyce, is one example of those early days of development. The 1896 building is still standing, along with several other school buildings from the development of the area. Renfrew–Collingwood is also the home of Vancouver's only remaining craftsman style firehall, Firehall 15, at the corner of Nootka and 22nd avenues. Currently, the City of Vancouver is researching the feasibility of preserving this building, as well the historically significant 2400 motel on Kingsway, though the future of both sites is very much in doubt.

In 2007, the City of Vancouver announced the Norquay Village Neighbourhood Centre Program, one of several neighbourhood centre programs it plans to implement as part of its Eco-Density initiative. If the program goes ahead, much of Renfrew–Collingwood will be re-zoned from single-family homes to duplexes, with areas along some of the busier streets zoned for rowhouses. The idea is to increase density and encourage the development of shopping centres along Earles and Rupert streets. The plan is controversial: the city claims that density is better for the Earth's environment, but many residents do not want their neighbourhood to lose its single-family home character.

The commercial area is anchored by a Safeway supermarket adjoining which is the Eldorado Motor Hotel, and features a wide array of businesses, including a variety of ethnic-owned and ethnic-themed businesses. The area includes Kensington Gardens, the new master-planned community comprising three residential towers, a supermarket, retail shops, Asian-inspired restaurant, parks and greenspace. It was created by Vancouver-based developer Westbank. Civic services in the area include a branch of the Vancouver Public Library and recreation centre, as well as an official city neighbourhood office.
