= 29th Avenue station =

Metro Vancouver SkyTrain station

29th Avenue
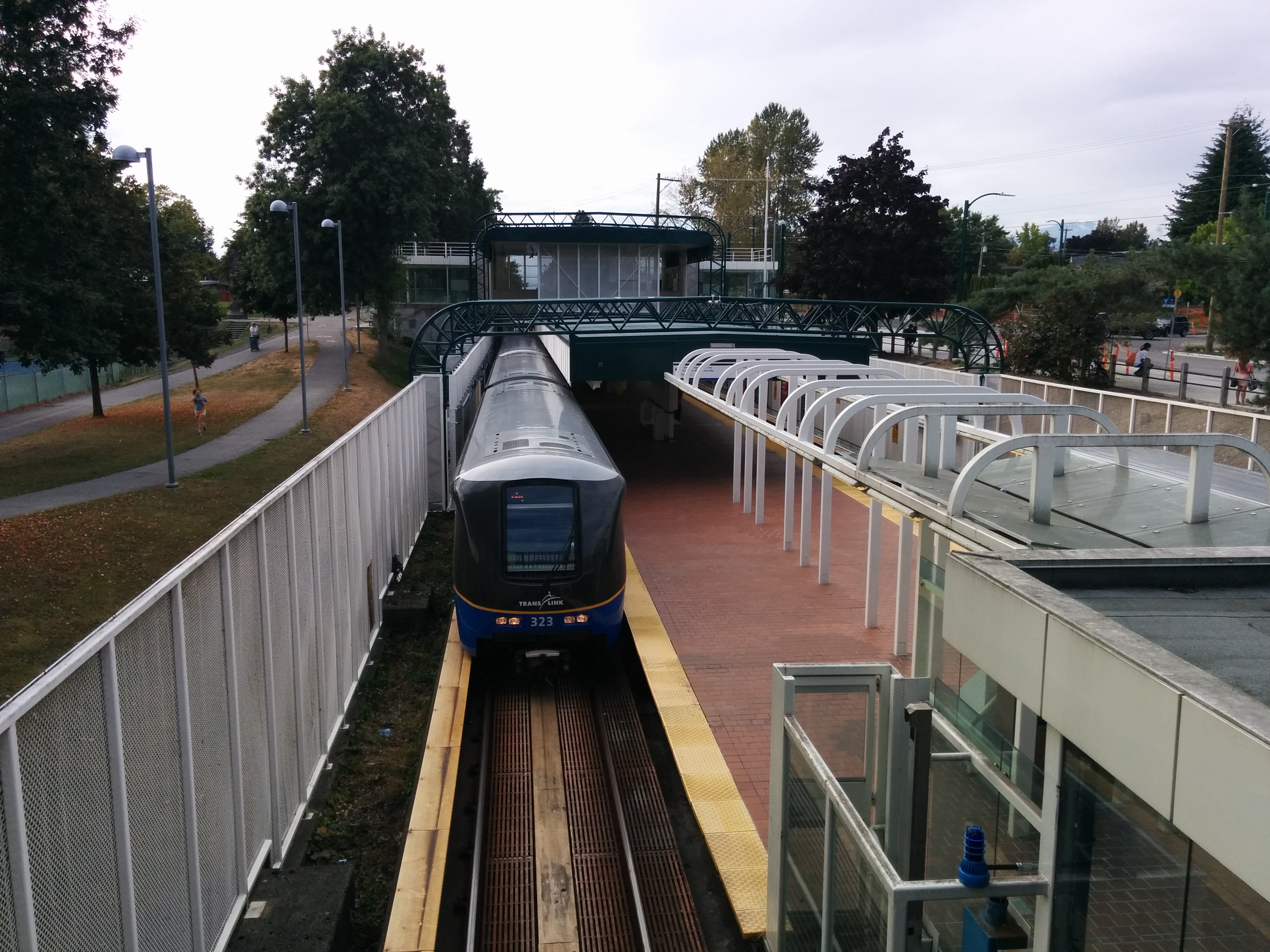
- 29th Avenue station in 2017

General information
- Location: 2790 East 29th Avenue; Vancouver, British Columbia
- Coordinates: 49.244084°N 123.045931°W
- System: SkyTrain station
- Owner: TransLink
- Platforms: Centre platform
- Tracks: 2

Construction
- Structure type: At grade
- Accessible: yes
- Architect: Architektengruppe U-Bahn

Other information
- Station code: TN
- Fare zone: 1

History
- Opened: December 11, 1985; 40 years ago

Passengers
- 2025: 2,238,000 ▼1.8%
- Rank: 25 of 54

Services
Preceding station	TransLink	Following station
Nanaimo towards Waterfront	Expo Line	Joyce–Collingwood towards King George or Production Way–University
Location

29th Avenue is an at-grade station on the Expo Line of Metro Vancouver's SkyTrain rapid transit system. The station is located on 29th Avenue at Atlin Street, adjacent to Slocan Park in the Renfrew Heights neighbourhood of Vancouver, British Columbia, Canada.

== History ==
29th Avenue station was opened in 1985 as part of the original SkyTrain system (now known as the Expo Line). The Austrian architecture firm Architektengruppe U-Bahn was responsible for designing the station.

The station is located on the old right-of-way of the former Central Park Line of the British Columbia Electric Railway. This line formerly ran just west of where Nanaimo station is today and continued east to where the current New Westminster station is located.

In 2002, Millennium Line service was introduced to the station, which provided outbound service to VCC–Clark station (originally Commercial Drive) via Columbia station in New Westminster. This service was discontinued and replaced with an Expo Line branch to Production Way–University station in 2016.

In January 2017, upgrades began on the station's bus exchange, which included an additional bus bay to allow all buses to use the bus loop as well as three new crosswalks to improve safety and access. Construction was completed in February 2018.

== Station information ==
=== Entrances ===
29th Avenue station is served by three entrances. The two main entrances are located at the northwest end of the station: one entrance faces 29th Avenue and the station's bus loop, while the other entrance is adjacent to Slocan Park. The third entrance is located at the southeast end of the station. This entrance is accessible by an overhead walkway and does not allow access for the disabled.

=== Transit connections ===
Bus bay assignments:

Bay	Routes	Notes
1	33 UBC	
2	29 Elliott	
3	16 Arbutus	Trolley bus service
4	26 Joyce Station	
5	—	Special service
