= UBC Exchange =

Public transit exchange in Metro Vancouver, Canada

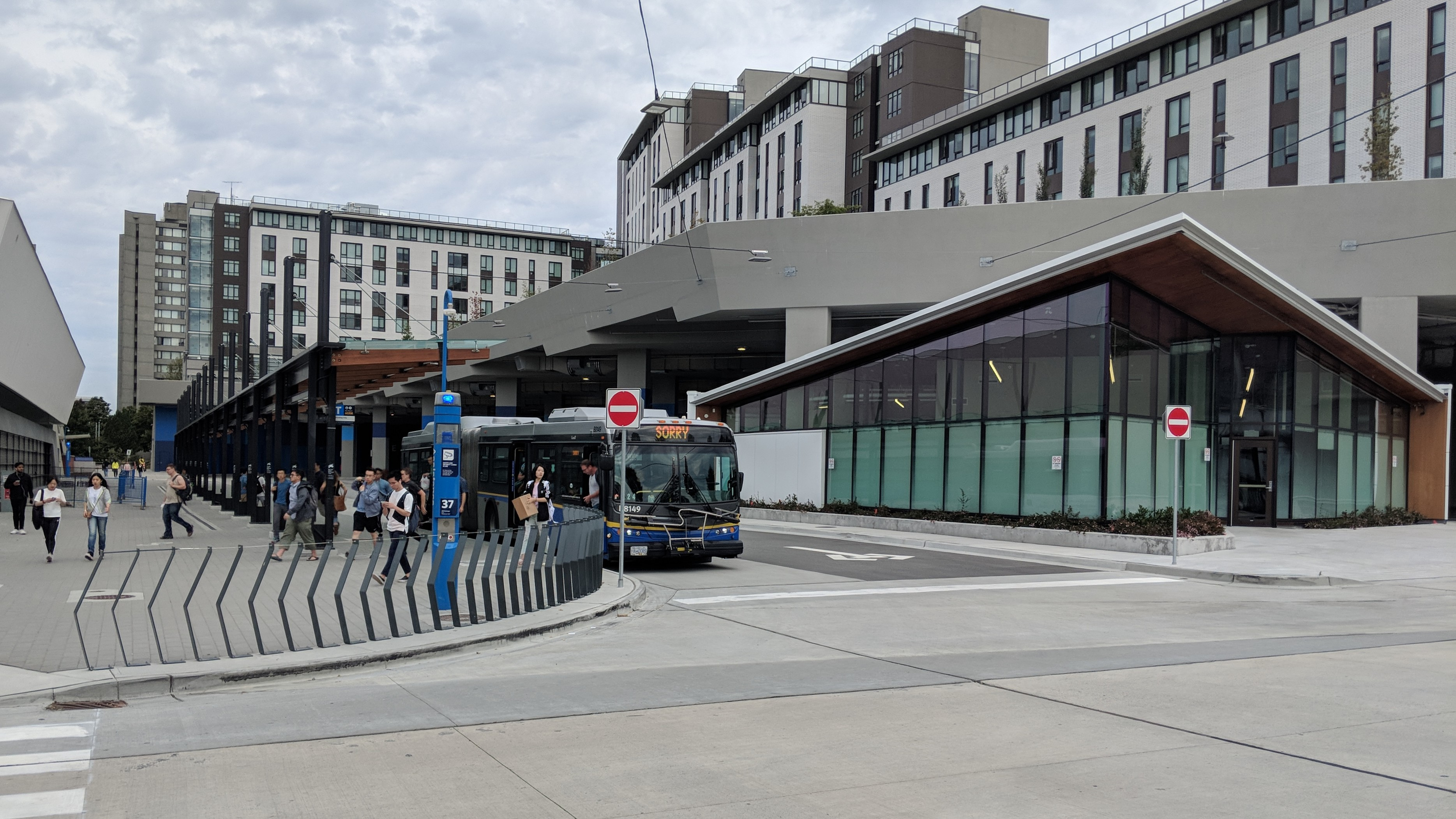
- Unloading zone located at the north loop

General information
- Location: University Endowment Lands; British Columbia, Canada
- Coordinates: 49°16′6″N 123°14′52″W
- Operator: TransLink
- Bus routes: 16
- Bus stands: 13
- Bus operators: Coast Mountain Bus Company
- Connections: 99 B-Line; R4 41st Ave

Other information
- Fare zone: 1

History
- Opened: September 1945
- Rebuilt: 1988, 2003, 2017–19
- Former names: UBC Loop
Location

UBC Exchange (formerly known as UBC Loop) is a major public transit exchange point in the University Endowment Lands adjacent to Vancouver, British Columbia, Canada. The first major bus loop located at the University of British Columbia (UBC) opened in September 1945 to serve students, staff, and faculty.

== History ==
On September 5, 1988, trolley wires were extended to the loop providing the University with trolley bus service for the first time.

In 2003, the campus opened two temporary loops used by TransLink buses travelling to and from UBC: the south loop (used mainly for trolley buses) and the north loop. These temporary loops replaced the old bus loop to make room for a proposed new underground bus loop that was ultimately never built.

The new underground bus loop was slated to be built beside the Student Union Building, on the site of a small mound called the "Grassy Knoll", which was set to be removed to make way for the new loop. This plan was unpopular with a number of UBC students. Several students were arrested after a protest in support of the knoll was shut down by the police in April 2008.

On October 27, 2009, the University announced in an open letter that, because Translink was no longer committing $10 million toward the $50 million underground loop project, a surface loop would be built instead.

On July 9, 2014, it was announced that due to construction of the new UBC Aquatic Centre starting on MacInnes Field, pedestrian and cyclist access to the bus loop would be restricted, and several stops would be temporarily moved. It was estimated the construction would be completed in 2016.

In March 2017, all diesel bus stops in the former north loop were relocated to Wesbrook Mall for the duration of construction of the new UBC Exchange. Construction was completed in late August 2019 at a cost of $22 million. LED departure signs were installed and became operational in December 2021.

== Routes ==
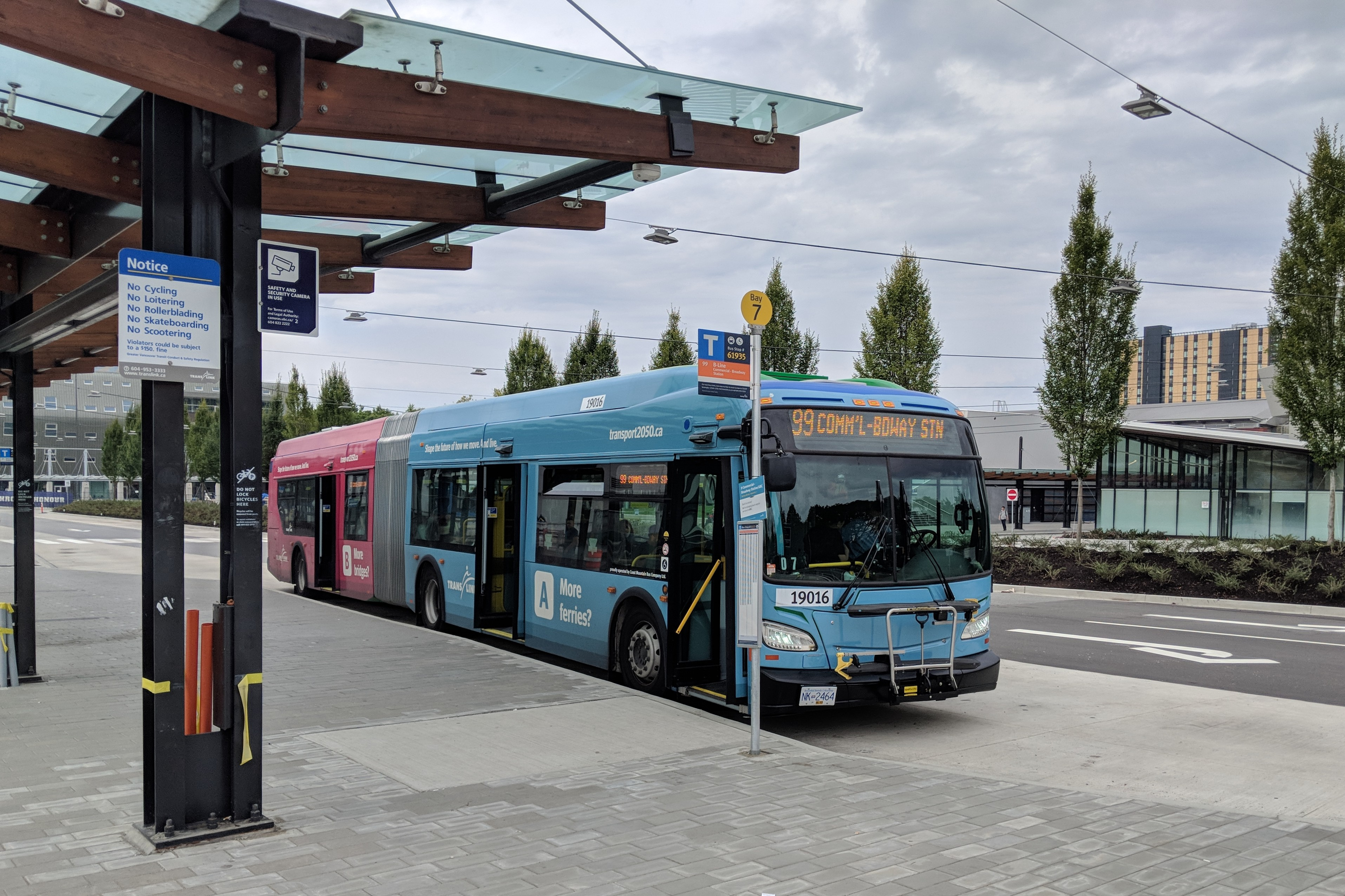
99 B-Line with service to Commercial–Broadway is located in the north loop

The following routes terminate at UBC Exchange. Routes highlighted in green with a dagger (†) are express or limited stop.

=== North bus loop ===
The north loop, serving most diesel and hybrid bus routes, is surrounded by MacInnes Field to its west, the Aquatic Centre to its north, and the War Memorial Gym to its south. The loop is partially underneath the Exchange residence located on the west side of Wesbrook Mall.

Bay	Route	Destination	Notes
1	33	29th Avenue Station	
1	68	Wesbrook Village	
2	84†	VCC–Clark Station	Limited stops between UBC and 4th Ave & Fir
3	44†	Downtown; Waterfront Station; Dundarave	Limited stops between UBC and Burrard & 2nd Ave; Weekdays only; final departure at 7:05 pm; Select trips extend to Dundarave
3	N17	Downtown	
4	R4 41st Ave†	Joyce Station	
5	480†	Bridgeport Station	Weekdays only; Limited stops in Vancouver; Route suspended owing to COVID-19 pandemic
6	49	Metrotown Station	
7	99 B-Line†	Commercial–Broadway Station	Some trips continue to Boundary & 1st Ave
8	25	Brentwood Station	Late night trips short turn at King Edward & Granville

=== South bus loop ===
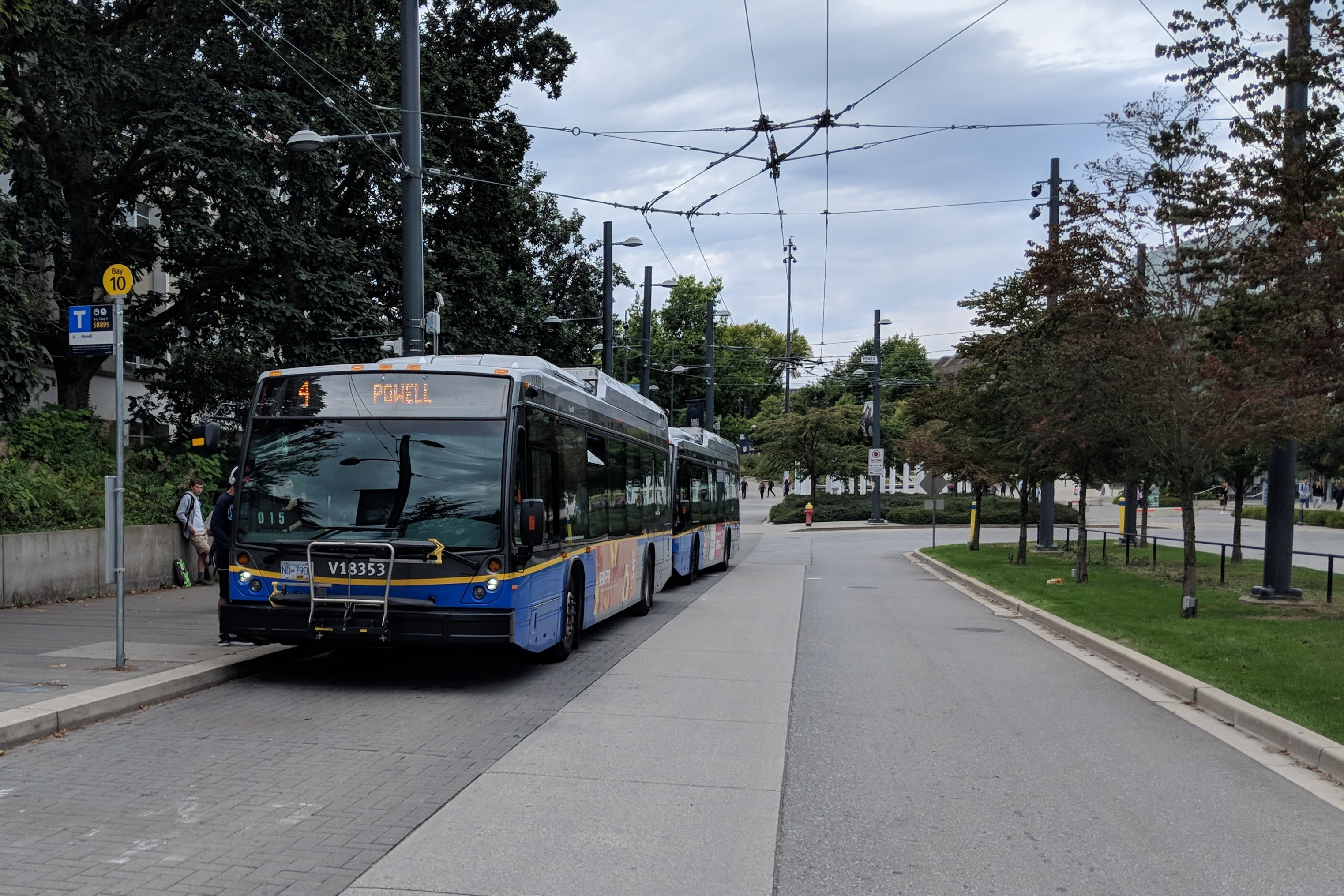
Trolley bus service terminates at the south loop on University Boulevard

The south loop, serving trolley buses and limited-service diesel buses, is located on University Boulevard west of Wesbrook Mall.

Bay	Route	Destination	Notes
9	9	Boundary; Boundary Loop; Commercial–Broadway Station	Weekday peak hours only; Operates to/from UBC only when UBC is in winter session (Sep–Apr)
10	14	Hastings	Operates to Kootenay Loop; Evening trips to Homer/Hastings only
11	4	Powell; Eton & Renfrew	Evening trips to Cambie & Hastings only; Early morning trips to/from Blanca Loop
12	HandyDART	—	
13	Spare		
