= Nanaimo station =

Metro Vancouver SkyTrain station

Nanaimo
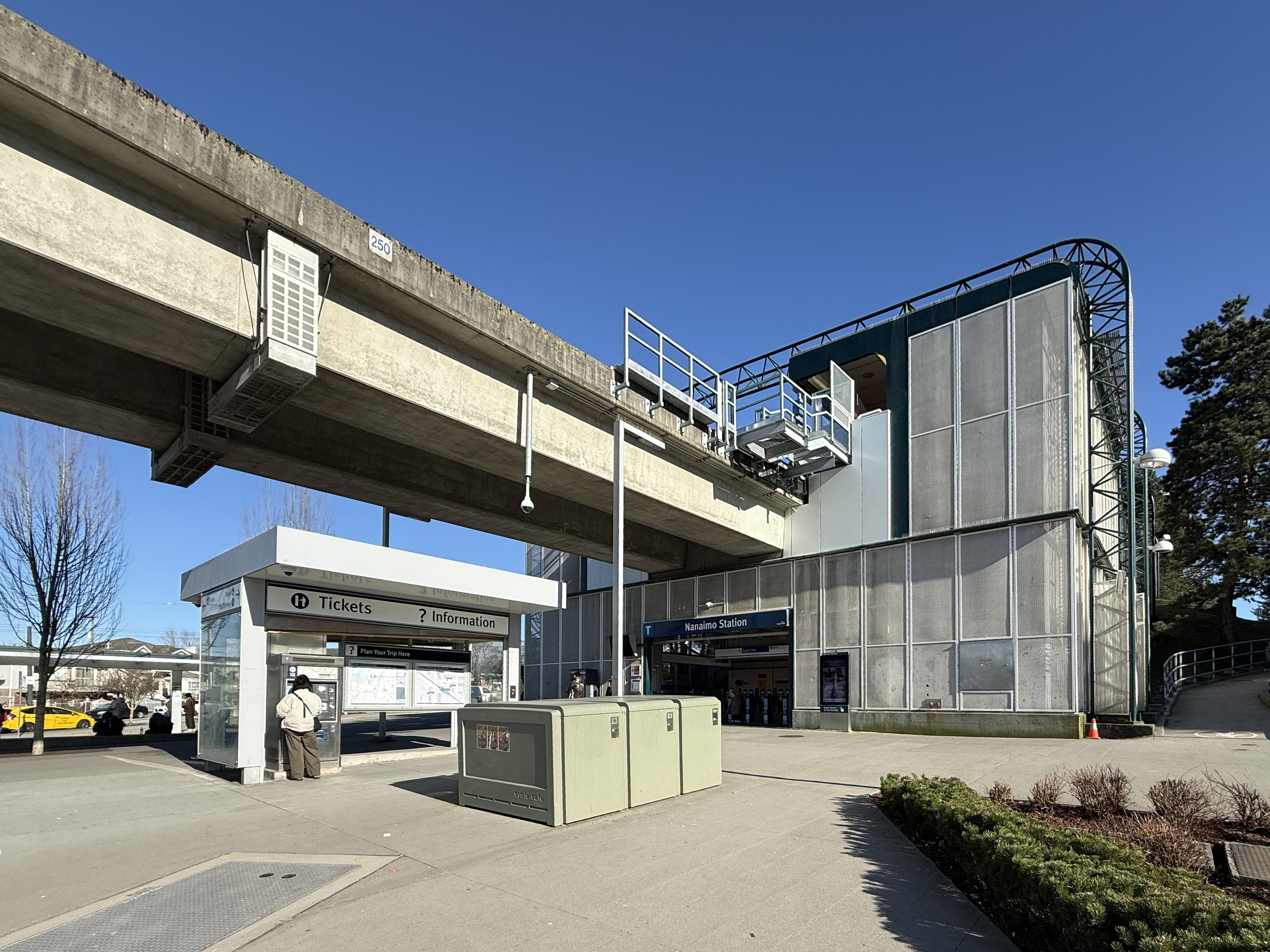
- Street level view, facing southeast

General information
- Location: 2450 East 24th Avenue, Vancouver
- Coordinates: 49.248184°N 123.05564°W
- System: SkyTrain station
- Owner: TransLink
- Platforms: Side platforms
- Tracks: 2

Construction
- Structure type: Partially elevated
- Accessible: yes
- Architect: Architektengruppe U-Bahn

Other information
- Station code: NA
- Fare zone: 1

History
- Opened: December 11, 1985; 40 years ago

Passengers
- 2025: 2,181,000 ▼1.7%
- Rank: 28 of 54

Services
Preceding station	TransLink	Following station
Commercial–Broadway towards Waterfront	Expo Line	29th Avenue towards King George or Production Way–University
Location

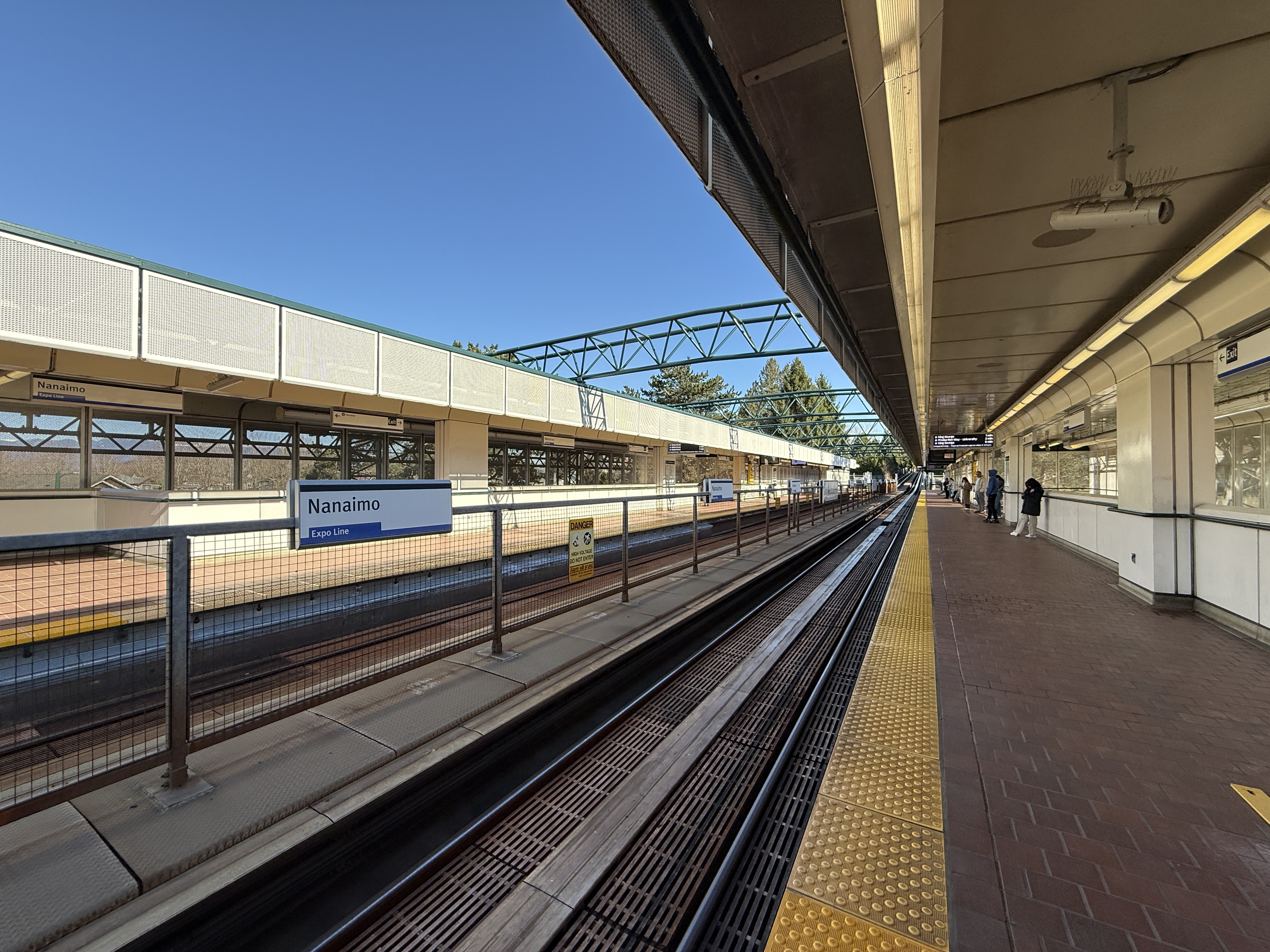
Platform level

Nanaimo is a partially elevated station on the Expo Line of Metro Vancouver's SkyTrain rapid transit system. The station is located on Nanaimo Street between Vanness Avenue and East 24th Avenue in Vancouver, British Columbia, Canada. The station takes its name from Nanaimo Street, which is named after the city of Nanaimo on Vancouver Island. Situated on a hillcrest, the station provides riders with a view of the west side and Downtown Vancouver.

== History ==
Nanaimo station was opened in 1985 as part of the original SkyTrain system (now known as the Expo Line). The Austrian architecture firm Architektengruppe U-Bahn was responsible for designing the station.

The station is the westernmost station on the Expo Line that sits atop of the former Central Park Line of the British Columbia Electric Railway. This line formerly ran just west of Nanaimo station to where New Westminster station is located today.

In 2002, Millennium Line service was introduced to the station, which provided outbound service to VCC–Clark station (originally Commercial Drive) via Columbia station in New Westminster. This service was discontinued and replaced with an Expo Line branch to Production Way–University station in 2016.

In the fourth quarter of 2018, TransLink was scheduled to begin a major upgrade of the station's bus exchange and entrance plaza to "improve safety and comfort for [the station's] passengers and to prepare for future service expansions". Construction began on the expansion of the bus loop on January 4, 2019, and was scheduled to be completed in the fourth quarter of 2019. The completion date was later pushed back to early 2020. The bus loop was largely complete by July 9, 2020.

== Station information ==
=== Entrances ===
Nanaimo station is served by a single entrance located at the west end of that station. The entrance is accessible from Nanaimo Street, south of East 24th Avenue across the street from Vanness Avenue.

=== Transit connections ===
Bus bay assignments are as follows:

Bay	Routes	Notes
1	25 Brentwood Station	
2	25 UBC	To UBC Exchange
3	7 Dunbar	Trolley bus
4	—	HandyDART service

== See also ==
- Filipino Plaza
