= List of postal codes of Canada: V =

This is a list of postal codes in Canada where the first letter is V. Postal codes beginning with V are located within the Canadian province of British Columbia. Only the first three characters are listed, corresponding to the Forward Sortation Area (FSA). The V postal code area is currently the most utilized in Canada, with only three of the 180 available urban FSAs not yet assigned.

Canada Post provides a free postal code look-up tool on its website, via its mobile apps for such smartphones as the iPhone and BlackBerry, and sells hard-copy directories and CD-ROMs. Many vendors also sell validation tools, which allow customers to properly match addresses and postal codes. Hard-copy directories can also be consulted in all post offices, and some libraries.

== British Columbia ==
There are currently 195 FSAs in this list.

=== Urban ===
V1A; Kimberley	V2A; Penticton	V3A; Langley Township (Langley City)	V4A; Surrey; Southwest	V5A; Burnaby (Government Road / Lake City / SFU / Burnaby Mountain)	V6A; Vancouver (Strathcona / Chinatown / Downtown Eastside)	V7A; Richmond; South	V8A; Powell River	V9A; Victoria (Vic West / Esquimalt) Canadian Forces (MARPAC)
V1B; Vernon; East	V2B; Kamloops; Northwest	V3B; Port Coquitlam; Central	V4B; White Rock	V5B; Burnaby (Parkcrest-Aubrey / Ardingley-Sprott)	V6B; Vancouver (NE Downtown / Gastown / Harbour Centre / International Village / Victory Square / Yaletown)	V7B; Richmond (Sea Island / YVR)	V8B; Squamish	V9B; Victoria (West Highlands / North Langford / View Royal)
V1C; Cranbrook	V2C; Kamloops; Central and Southeast	V3C; Port Coquitlam; South	V4C; Delta; Northeast	V5C; Burnaby (Burnaby Heights / Willingdon Heights / West Central Valley)	V6C; Vancouver (Waterfront / Coal Harbour / Canada Place)	V7C; Richmond; Northwest	V8C; Kitimat	V9C; Victoria (Colwood / South Langford / Metchosin)
V1E; Salmon Arm	V2E; Kamloops; South and West	V3E; Coquitlam; North	V4E; Delta; East	V5E; Burnaby (Lakeview-Mayfield / Richmond Park / Kingsway-Beresford)	V6E; Vancouver (SE West End / Davie Village)	V7E; Richmond; Southwest	V8E; Whistler	V9E; Victoria (East Highlands / NW Saanich)
V1G; Dawson Creek	V2G; Williams Lake	V3G; Abbotsford; East	V4G; Delta; East Central	V5G; Burnaby (Cascade-Schou / Douglas-Gilpin)	V6G; Vancouver (NW West End / Stanley Park)	V7G; Deep Cove, Dollarton, Roche Point, Indian Arm Communities, District of North Vancouver	V8G; Terrace	V9G; Ladysmith
V1H; Vernon; West	V2H; Kamloops; North	V3H; Port Moody	V4H; Not assigned	V5H; Burnaby (Maywood / Marlborough / Oakalla / Windsor)	V6H; Vancouver (West Fairview / Granville Island / NE Shaughnessy)	V7H; Maplewood, Seymour, District of North VancouverTsleil-Waututh Nation Reserve #3	V8H; Cobble Hill / Mill Bay / Shawnigan Lake	V9H; Campbell River; Outskirts
V1J; Fort St. John	V2J; Quesnel	V3J; Coquitlam; North	V4J; Not assigned	V5J; Burnaby (Suncrest / Sussex-Nelson / Clinton-Glenwood / West Big Bend)	V6J; Vancouver (NW Shaughnessy / East Kitsilano / Quilchena)	V7J; Lynnmour, District of North Vancouver, Moodyville, City of North Vancouver	V8J; Prince Rupert	V9J; Courtenay; Northern Outskirts
V1K; Merritt	V2K; Prince George; North	V3K; Coquitlam; South	V4K; Delta; Northwest	V5K; Vancouver (North Hastings-Sunrise)	V6K; Vancouver (Central Kitsilano / Greektown)	V7K; Lynn Valley, District of North Vancouver	V8K; Salt Spring Island	V9K; Qualicum Beach
V1L; Nelson	V2L; Prince George; East Central	V3L; New Westminster; Northeast	V4L; Delta; Southeast	V5L; Vancouver (North Grandview- Woodland)	V6L; Vancouver (NW Arbutus Ridge / NE Dunbar- Southlands)	V7L; Lower Lonsdale, Central Lonsdale, Grand Boulevard, Cedar Village, Tempe, City of North Vancouver, Keith-Lynn, District of North Vancouver	V8L; Sidney (North Saanich / YYJ)	V9L; Duncan
V1M; Langley Township; North	V2M; Prince George; West Central	V3M; New Westminster; Southwest (Includes Annacis Island)	V4M; Delta; Southwest	V5M; Vancouver (South Hastings-Sunrise / North Renfrew- Collingwood)	V6M; Vancouver (South Shaughnessy / NW Oakridge / NE Kerrisdale / SE Arbutus Ridge)	V7M; Marine-Hamilton, Mahon, Westview, District of North VancouverSquamish Nation Reserve #1 (Eslhá7an)	V8M; Central Saanich	V9M; Comox
V1N; Castlegar	V2N; Prince George; South	V3N; Burnaby (East Big Bend / Stride Avenue / Edmonds / Cariboo-Armstrong)	V4N; Surrey; Northeast	V5N; Vancouver (South Grandview- Woodland / NE Kensington-Cedar Cottage)	V6N; Vancouver (West Kerrisdale / South Dunbar- Southlands / Musqueam)	V7N; Upper Lonsdale, Delbrook, District of North Vancouver	V8N; Victoria (East Saanich)	V9N; Courtenay; Central
V1P; Kelowna; East	V2P; Chilliwack; Central	V3P; Not assigned	V4P; Surrey; South	V5P; Vancouver (SE Kensington-Cedar Cottage / Victoria- Fraserview)	V6P; Vancouver (SE Kerrisdale / SW Oakridge / West Marpole)	V7P; Lower Capilano, District of North Vancouver	V8P; Victoria (SE Saanich / UVic)	V9P; Parksville
V1R; Trail	V2R; Chilliwack; West	V3R; Surrey; North	V4R; Maple Ridge; Northwest	V5R; Vancouver (South Renfrew- Collingwood)	V6R; Vancouver (West Kitsilano / West Point Grey / Jericho)	V7R; Upper Capilano, District of North Vancouver	V8R; Victoria (North Oak Bay / North Fernwood / North Jubilee / South Jubilee / East Oaklands)	V9R; Nanaimo; South
V1S; Kamloops; Southwest	V2S; Abbotsford; Southeast	V3S; Surrey; Upper East	V4S; Mission; West	V5S; Vancouver (Killarney)	V6S; Vancouver (NW Dunbar- Southlands / Chaldecutt / South University Endowment Lands)	V7S; Hollyburn, Cedardale, District of West Vancouver	V8S; Victoria (South Oak Bay / East Fairfield / Gonzales / South Fernwood / Rockland)	V9S; Nanaimo; Central
V1T; Vernon; Central	V2T; Abbotsford; Southwest	V3T; Surrey; Inner Northwest	V4T; West Kelowna (Westbank)	V5T; Vancouver (East Mount Pleasant)	V6T; Vancouver (UBC)	V7T; Ambleside, Park Royal, District of West Vancouver	V8T; Victoria (SE Burnside / Hillside-Quadra / North Park / West Oaklands / Rock Bay)	V9T; Nanaimo (North / Wellington / Northfield / Departure Bay)
V1V; Kelowna; North	V2V; Mission; East	V3V; Surrey; Outer Northwest	V4V; Winfield	V5V; Vancouver (West Kensington-Cedar Cottage / NE Riley Park)	V6V; Richmond; Northeast	V7V; Dundarave, Altamont, West Bay, District of West Vancouver	V8V; Victoria (Cook Street Village / West Fairfield / Harris Green / Humboldt Valley / James Bay)	V9V; Nanaimo; Northwest
V1W; Kelowna; Southwest	V2W; Maple Ridge; East	V3W; Surrey; Upper West	V4W; Langley Township; East	V5W; Vancouver (SE Riley Park / SW Kensington-Cedar Cottage / NE Oakridge / North Sunset)	V6W; Richmond; Southeast	V7W; Horseshoe Bay, Eagle Harbour, Caulfeild, District of West Vancouver	V8W; Victoria (Downtown / Chinatown) British Columbia Provincial Government	V9W; Campbell River; Central
V1X; Kelowna; East Central	V2X; Maple Ridge; West	V3X; Surrey; Lower West	V4X; Abbotsford; West	V5X; Vancouver (SE Oakridge / East Marpole / South Sunset)	V6X; Richmond; North	V7X; Vancouver (Bentall Centre)	V8X; Victoria (South Saanich)	V9X; Nanaimo (Cedar)
V1Y; Kelowna; Central	V2Y; Langley Township; Northwest	V3Y; Pitt Meadows	V4Y; Armstrong / Spallumcheen / Enderby	V5Y; Vancouver (West Mount Pleasant / West Riley Park)	V6Y; Richmond; Central	V7Y; Vancouver (Pacific Centre)	V8Y; Victoria (NE Saanich)	V9Y; Port Alberni
V1Z; West Kelowna; East	V2Z; Langley Township; Southwest	V3Z; Surrey; Lower East	V4Z; Chilliwack; East	V5Z; Vancouver (East Fairview / South Cambie)	V6Z; Vancouver (SW Downtown)	V7Z; Sechelt (Halfmoon Bay)	V8Z; Victoria (Middle Saanich)	V9Z; Sooke

=== Rural ===
V0A
Upper Columbia Region

0A0: Golden
1B0: Brisco
1E0: Edgewater
1G0: Field
1H0: Golden
1J0: Harrogate
1K0: Invermere
1L0: Parson
1M0: Radium Hot Springs
1P0: Spillimacheen
1T0: Panorama

V0B
East Kootenay

1A0: Boswell
1B0: Canal Flats
1C0: Canyon
1E0: Crawford Bay
1G0: Creston
1H0: Elkford
1K0: Erickson
1L0: Fairmont Hot Springs
1M0: Fernie
1N0: Fort Steele
1R0: Grasmere
1S0: Gray Creek
1T0: Jaffray
1V1: Kingsgate
1W1: Kitchener
1X0: Kootenay Bay
2A0: Moyie
2B0: Riondel
2C0: Sirdar
2E0: Skookumchuck
2G0: Sparwood
2H0: Ta Ta Creek
2J0: Wardner
2K0: Wasa
2L0: Windermere
2N0: Wynndel
2P0: Yahk
3G0: Creston

V0C
Northern British Columbia

1B0: Arras
1C0: Baldonnel
1E0: Jade City
1G0: Cecil Lake
1H0: Charlie Lake
1J0: Chetwynd
1K0: Clayhurst
1L0: Dease Lake
1N0: Farmington
1R0: Fort Nelson
1S0: Goodlow
1T0: Groundbirch
1V0: Hudson's Hope
1W0: Lower Post
1X0: Moberly Lake
1Y0: Montney
1Z0: Muncho Lake
2A0: North Pine
2B0: Pink Mountain
2C0: Pouce Coupe
2E0: Progress
2G0: Rolla
2H0: Rose Prairie
2J0: Sunset Prairie
2K0: Taylor
2L0: Tomslake
2N0: Wonowon
2R0: Buick
2S0: Prespatou
2T0: Altona
2V0: Prophet River
2W0: Tumbler Ridge
2X0: Toad River
2Z0: Good Hope Lake

V0E
North Thompson, Shuswap and Northeast Okanagan

1B0: Armstrong
1C0: Avola
1E0: Barriere
1H0: Blind Bay
1J0: Blue River
1K0: Canoe
1M0: Chase
1N0: Clearwater
1R0: Darfield
1S0: Douglas Lake
1T0: Eagle Bay
1V0: Enderby
1W0: Falkland
1Y0: Grindrod
1Z0: Heffley Creek
2A0: Knutsford
2C0: Little Fort
2E0: Louis Creek
2G0: Lumby
2H0: McLure
2J0: Malakwa
2K0: Mara
2L0: Mica Creek
2M0: Monte Creek
2N0: Monte Lake
2P0: Pritchard
2R0: Quilchena
2S0: Revelstoke
2V0: Sicamous
2W0: Sorrento
2X0: Tappen
2Z0: Valemount
3A0: Vavenby
3B0: Westwold
3E0: Pinantan Lake
3L0: Scotch Creek
3S0: Revelstoke
3W0: Sorrento
3Z0: Clearwater
5N0: Sun Peaks

V0G
West Kootenay

1A0: Ainsworth Hot Springs
1B0: Argenta
1C0: Balfour
1E0: Burton
1G0: Genelle
1H0: Crescent Valley
1J0: Edgewood
1K0: Fauquier
1L0: Fruitvale
1M0: Kaslo
1N0: Meadow Creek
1P0: Montrose
1R0: Nakusp
1S0: New Denver
1V0: Procter
1X0: Robson
1Y0: Rossland
1Z0: Salmo
2B0: Silverton
2C0: Slocan
2E0: Slocan Park
2G0: South Slocan
2J0: Winlaw
2K0: Ymir

V0H
Southeast Okanagan and Boundary Country

1A0: Beaverdell
1B0: Bridesville
1E0: Christina Lake
1H0: Grand Forks
1J0: Greenwood
1K0: Kaleden
1M0: Midway
1N0: Naramata
1R0: Okanagan Falls
1T0: Oliver
1V0: Osoyoos
1X0: Peachland
1Y0: Rock Creek
1Z0: Summerland
2B0: Westbridge
2V0: Osoyoos
3H0: Grand Forks

V0J
Bulkley Valley, Omineca and Yellowhead

1A0: Aiyansh
1E0: Burns Lake
1G0: Cedarvale
1H0: Dome Creek
1J0: Dunster
1K0: Iskut
1L0: Endako
1N0: Fort Fraser
1P0: Fort St. James
1R0: Francois Lake
1S0: Fraser Lake
1T0: Germansen Landing
1W0: Granisle
1X0: Lax̱g̱altsʼap
1Y0: Hazelton
1Z0: Houston
2A0: Kitwanga
2B0: Longworth
2C0: Mackenzie
2E0: McBride
2G0: McLeod Lake
2H0: Manson Creek
2J0: New Hazelton
2K0: Penny
2N0: Smithers
2P0: Southbank
2S0: Summit Lake
2T0: Takla Landing
2W0: Telegraph Creek
2X0: Telkwa
2Y0: Topley
2Z0: Upper Fraser
3A0: Vanderhoof
3B0: Ware
3C0: Willow River
3E0: Crescent Spur
3G0: Bear Lake
3J0: Nass Camp
3M0: Sinclair Mills
3N0: Tsay Keh Dene
3S0: Meziadin Lake
3T0: Gitwinksihlkw
3W0: Smithers

V0K
Cariboo, Fraser Canyon and Western Okanagan

0A0: Lone Butte
1A0: Ashcroft
1B0: Barkerville
1C0: Boston Bar
1E0: Bridge Lake
1G0: Buffalo Creek
1H0: Cache Creek
1J0: Canim Lake
1K0: Clinton
1L0: Eagle Creek
1M0: Forest Grove
1N0: Gang Ranch
1P0: Gold Bridge
1S0: Hixon
1T0: Lac La Hache
1V0: Lillooet
1W0: Logan Lake
1X0: Lone Butte
1Y0: Lower Nicola
1Z0: Lytton
2E0: 100 Mile House
2G0: 150 Mile House
2H0: Pavilion
2J0: Savona
2K0: 70 Mile House
2L0: Spences Bridge
2P0: Walhachin
2R0: Wells
2S0: Yale
2Z0: 108 Mile Ranch

V0L
Chilcotin

1A0: Alexis Creek
1B0: Alkali Lake
1C0: Anahim Lake
1G0: Big Lake Ranch
1H0: Chilanko Forks
1J0: Dog Creek
1K0: Hanceville
1L0: Horsefly
1M0: Kleena Kleene
1N0: Likely
1P0: McLeese Lake
1R0: Nimpo Lake
1S0: Redstone
1T0: Riske Creek
1V0: Tatla Lake
1W0: Tatlayoko Lake
1X0: Nemaiah Valley

V0M
Harrison Lake Region

1A0: Agassiz
1G0: Deroche
1H0: Dewdney
1K0: Harrison Hot Springs
1L0: Harrison Mills
1N0: Lake Errock

V0N
North Vancouver Island, Sunshine Coast, Sea-to-Sky Country and Southern Gulf Islands

1A0: Alert Bay
1B0: Whistler
1E0: Blubber Bay
1G0: Bowen Island
1H0: Brackendale
1J0: Britannia Beach
1K0: Coal Harbour
1L0: D'Arcy
1M0: Dawsons Landing
1N0: Egmont
1P0: Galiano Island
1S0: Garden Bay
1T0: Garibaldi Highlands
1V0: Gibsons
1W0: Gillies Bay
1Z0: Holberg
2B0: Kingcome Inlet
2E0: Lions Bay
2G0: Lund
2H0: Madeira Park
2H1: Pender Harbour
2J0: Mayne Island
2K0: Mount Currie
2L0: Pemberton
2M0: Pender Island
2N0: Port Alice
2P0: Port Hardy
2R0: Port McNeill
2S0: Port Mellon
2V0: Quatsino
2W0: Roberts Creek
2Y0: Saturna
3A0: Sechelt
3B0: Seton Portage
3C0: Shalalth
3E0: Sointula
3J0: Telegraph Cove
3K0: Van Anda
3L0: Winter Harbour
3P0: Woss
3V0: Gibsons
3Z0: Furry Creek

V0P
North Central Vancouver Island and Discovery Islands

1B0: Blind Channel
1G0: Gold River
1H0: Heriot Bay
1J0: Kyuquot
1K0: Mansons Landing
1L0: Minstrel Island
1N0: Quathiaski Cove
1P0: Refuge Cove
1R0: Sayward
1S0: Simoom Sound
1T0: Squirrel Cove
1V0: Stuart Island
1W0: Surge Narrows
1X0: Tahsis
1Z0: Whaletown
2A0: Zeballos

V0R
Central and South Vancouver Island

1A0: Ahousat
1B0: Bamfield
1G0: Bowser
1H0: Cassidy
1K0: Chemainus
1M0: Coombs
1N0: Cowichan Bay
1R0: Crofton
1S0: Cumberland
1T0: Denman Island
1V0: Errington
1W0: Fanny Bay
1X0: Gabriola
1Y0: Honeymoon Bay
1Z0: Hornby Island
2B0: Kildonan
2C0: Koksilah
2G0: Lake Cowichan
2H0: Lantzville
2J0: Lasqueti
2K0: Lazo
2L0: Malahat
2M0: Merville
2N0: Mesachie Lake
2P0: Mill Bay
2V0: Royston
2Y0: Thetis Island
2Z0: Tofino
3A0: Ucluelet
3B0: Union Bay
3C0: Westholme
3E1: Youbou
4K0: Chemainus
5K0: Penelakut Island

V0S
Juan de Fuca Shore

0A1: Port Renfrew
1K0: Port Renfrew

V0T
Inside Passage and Haida Gwaii

0B1: Masset
1B0: Denny Island
1C0: Bella Coola
1H0: Hagensborg
1L0: Klemtu
1M0: Masset
1P0: Ocean Falls
1R0: Port Clements
1S0: Daajing Giids
1T0: Sandspit
1W0: Stewart
1Y0: Tlell
1Z0: Bella Bella
2B0: Haisla

V0V
Lower Skeena Region

1A0: Hartley Bay
1B0: Kincolith
1C0: Kitkatla
1E0: Oona River
1G0: Port Edward
1H0: Lax Kw'alaams

V0W
Atlin Region

0A0: Fraser
0A1: Atlin
1A0: Atlin

V0X
Similkameen Region

1C0: Cawston
1G0: Coalmont
1K0: Hedley
1L0: Hope
1N0: Keremeos
1R0: East Gate
1W0: Princeton
1X0: Rosedale
2L0: Tulameen
2W0: Princeton

V0Y
Not in use
V0Z
Not in use

== Most populated FSAs ==
1. V3S, 104,997
2. V3W, 95,970
3. V4N, 86,011
4. V0R, 72,310
5. V0E, 72,013

== Least populated FSAs ==
1. V4G, 72
2. V7Z, 203
3. V0S, 366
4. V0W, 503
5. V7B, 820
