= Kerrisdale =

Neighborhood in Vancouver, BC, Canada

Coordinates: 49.2236°N 123.1595°W

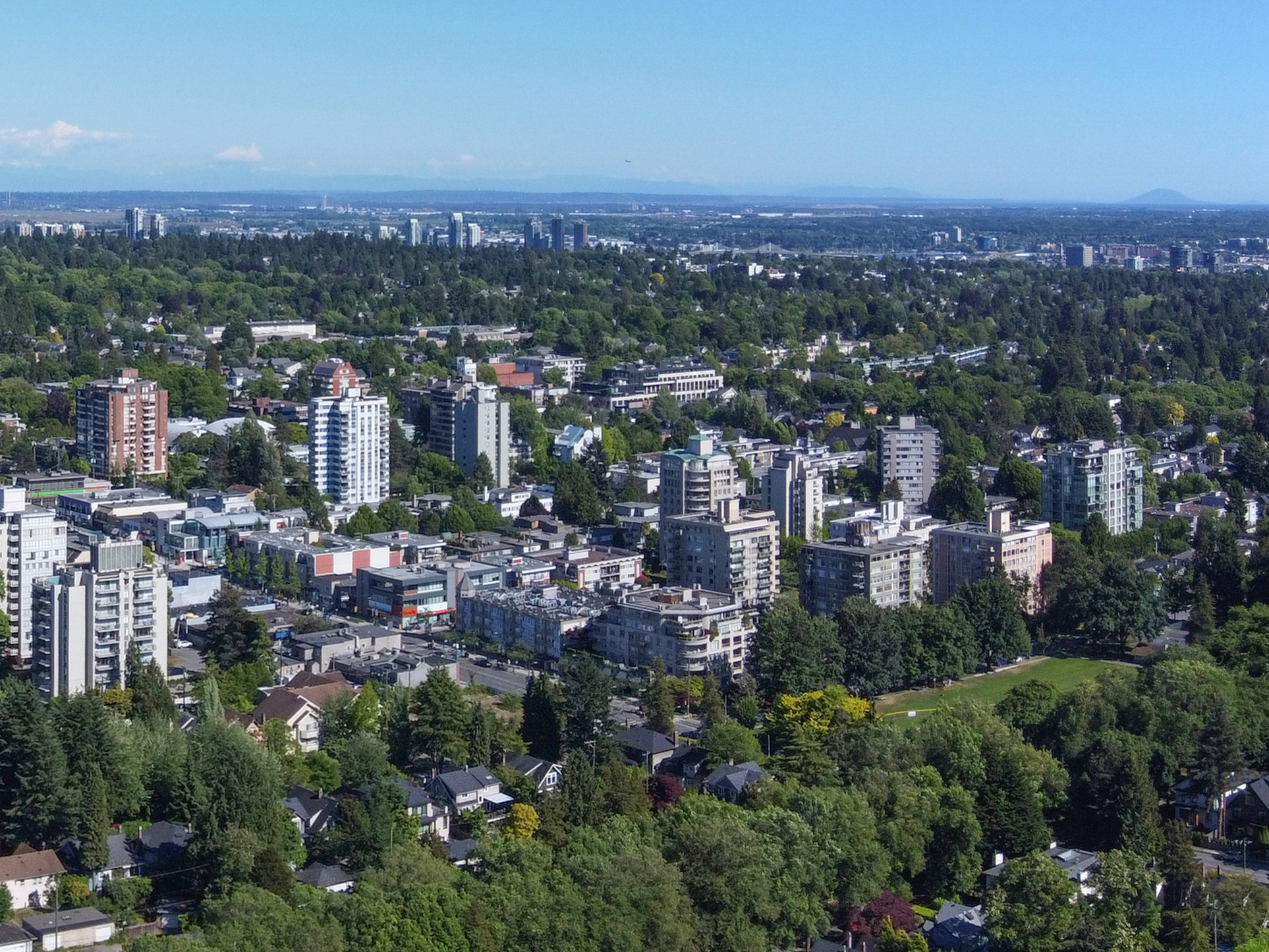
Aerial view of Kerrisdale in 2026

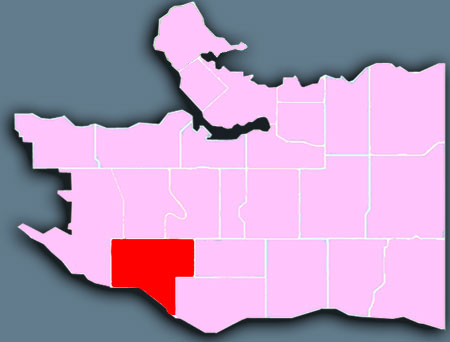
Location of Kerrisdale in Vancouver

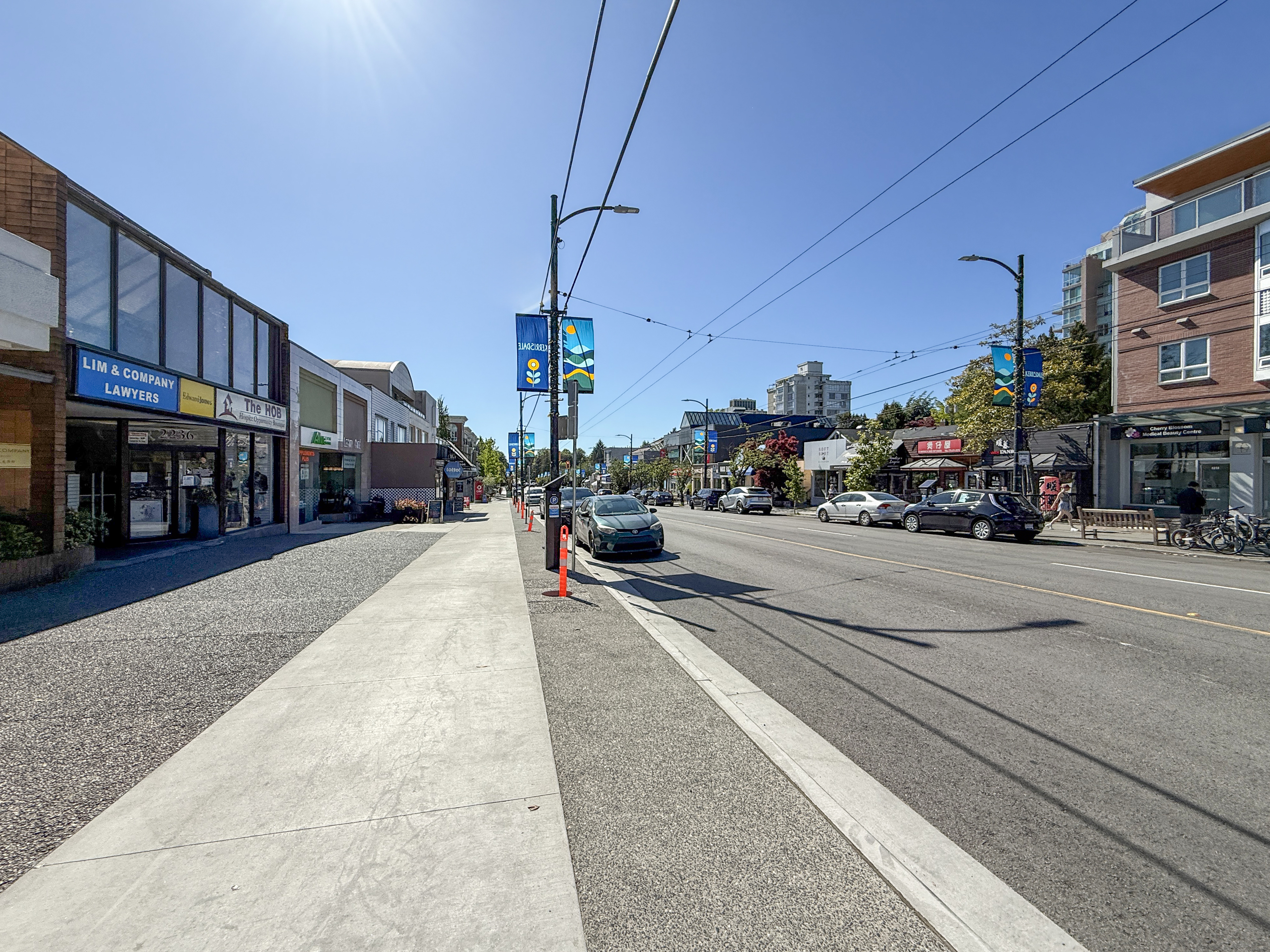
W 41 Avenue in Kerrisdale

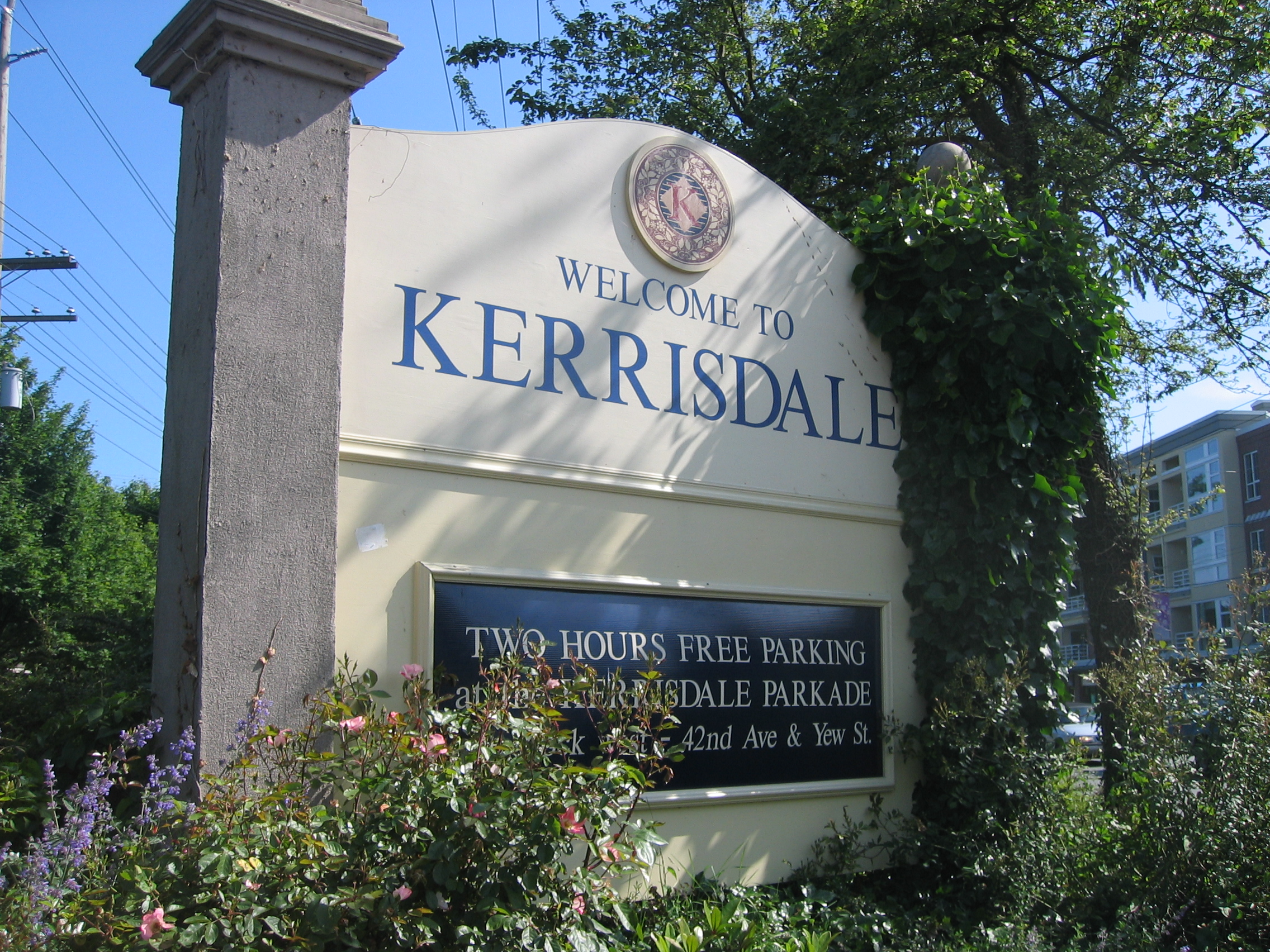
Welcome sign for the Kerrisdale shopping district, near 41st Avenue and West Boulevard

Kerrisdale is a neighbourhood in the city of Vancouver, British Columbia, Canada.

Kerrisdale is a neighbourhood located in Vancouver's west side. It features a mix of newer houses and older bungalows as well as various low and mid-rise rental and condo apartment buildings in its northern section. The neighbourhood is a racial mix of European and East Asian Canadians. It features a shopping district running generally along West 41st Avenue between Larch and Maple Streets and West Boulevard between 37th and 49th Avenues.

Although the city officially defines Kerrisdale as being south of 41st Ave (north of 41st is called Arbutus Ridge), the majority of the area's residents consider the area's boundaries to be West 33rd Avenue to the north, Granville Street to the east, West 57th Avenue to the south, and Blenheim Street to the west. The northern part of Marpole is also generally thought of as part of Kerrisdale, thus some refer to the area as Kerrisdale-Marpole. The southwestern part of Kerrisdale is known as Southlands, due to its location in relation to the city. Southlands is known for its horse stables and rural feel and is located on the floodplain of the North Arm of the Fraser River.

== History ==
Kerrisdale gained its name in 1905 when British Columbia Electric Railway manager R.H. Sterling asked Mrs. William McKinnon to name the interurban stop at Wilson Road (today West 41st Avenue). She chose to call it "Kerry's Dale", after the name of her family home, Kerrydale, in Gairloch, Scotland. Kerrydale means "little seat of the fairies". It was quickly corrupted to Kerrisdale. The area was part of the Municipality of Point Grey, which amalgamated January 1, 1929 with the City of Vancouver and the Municipality of South Vancouver. Many of the streets and avenues surrounding this focal intersection developed around this time, with local landmarks such as Point Grey Secondary School, Ryerson Church, Shannon Mews and the Allen Brown Estate constructed in these formative years.

== Demographics ==
As of the 2016 community census, there were 13,975 people, 5,530 private households, and 3,930 families residing in Kerrisdale.

Kerrisdale 2016 Community Census		% of Kerrisdale	% of Vancouver
Mother tongue Source:	English	49.4%	51.3%
Mother tongue Source:	Chinese	35.2%	21.5%
Mother tongue Source:	Korean	2.3%	1.3%
Mother tongue Source:	Spanish	1.0%	1.9%
Mother tongue Source:	German	1.0%	1.0%
Mother tongue Source:	Japanese	1.0%	1.1%

Although formerly British in character and demographics, Kerrisdale began to experience an influx of affluent immigrants from Hong Kong in the mid-1980s. This was partially due to the fears of Communist China taking over Hong Kong from the British in 1997 per the Sino-British Joint Declaration. Many of those Hong Kong immigrants constructed large, modern houses. Therefore, Kerrisdale is generally a mix of East Asian and Western architecture, with older bungalows in between new houses and renovated houses.

Kerrisdale has a mix of white-collar professionals, high net worth individuals, and university students renting basement suites or more inexpensive apartment blocks to attend nearby post-secondary institutions such as Langara College and the University of British Columbia. The area is also home to elderly residents who primarily rent in the low rise rental blocks that characterize the north central section of the community.

Projected average 2008 household income: $131,769 as compared with $75,854 and $79,798 for Vancouver and Metro Vancouver respectively.

Panethnic groups in the Kerrisdale neighbourhood (2001−2016)
Panethnic group	2016		2006		2001	
Panethnic group	Pop.	%	Pop.	%	Pop.	%
East Asian (Note: Statistic includes total responses of "Chinese", "Korean", and "Japanese" under visible minority section on census.)	6,935	49.91%	5,965	40.81%	5,570	39.89%
European (Note: Statistic includes all persons that did not make up part of a visible minority or an indigenous identity.)	5,700	41.02%	7,660	52.41%	7,630	54.64%
South Asian	390	2.81%	405	2.77%	275	1.97%
Southeast Asian (Note: Statistic includes total responses of "Filipino" and "Southeast Asian" under visible minority section on census.)	330	2.37%	260	1.78%	180	1.29%
Middle Eastern (Note: Statistic includes total responses of "West Asian" and "Arab" under visible minority section on census.)	125	0.9%	75	0.51%	45	0.32%
Latin American	105	0.76%	45	0.31%	50	0.36%
Indigenous	70	0.5%	80	0.55%	40	0.29%
African	20	0.14%	15	0.1%	100	0.72%
Other/Multiracial (Note: Statistic includes total responses of "Visible minority, n.i.e." and "Multiple visible minorities" under visible minority section on census.)	205	1.48%	110	0.75%	80	0.57%
Total responses	13,895	99.43%	14,615	100%	13,965	99.5%
Total population	13,975	100%	14,615	100%	14,035	100%
Note: Totals greater than 100% due to multiple origin responses

== Services ==
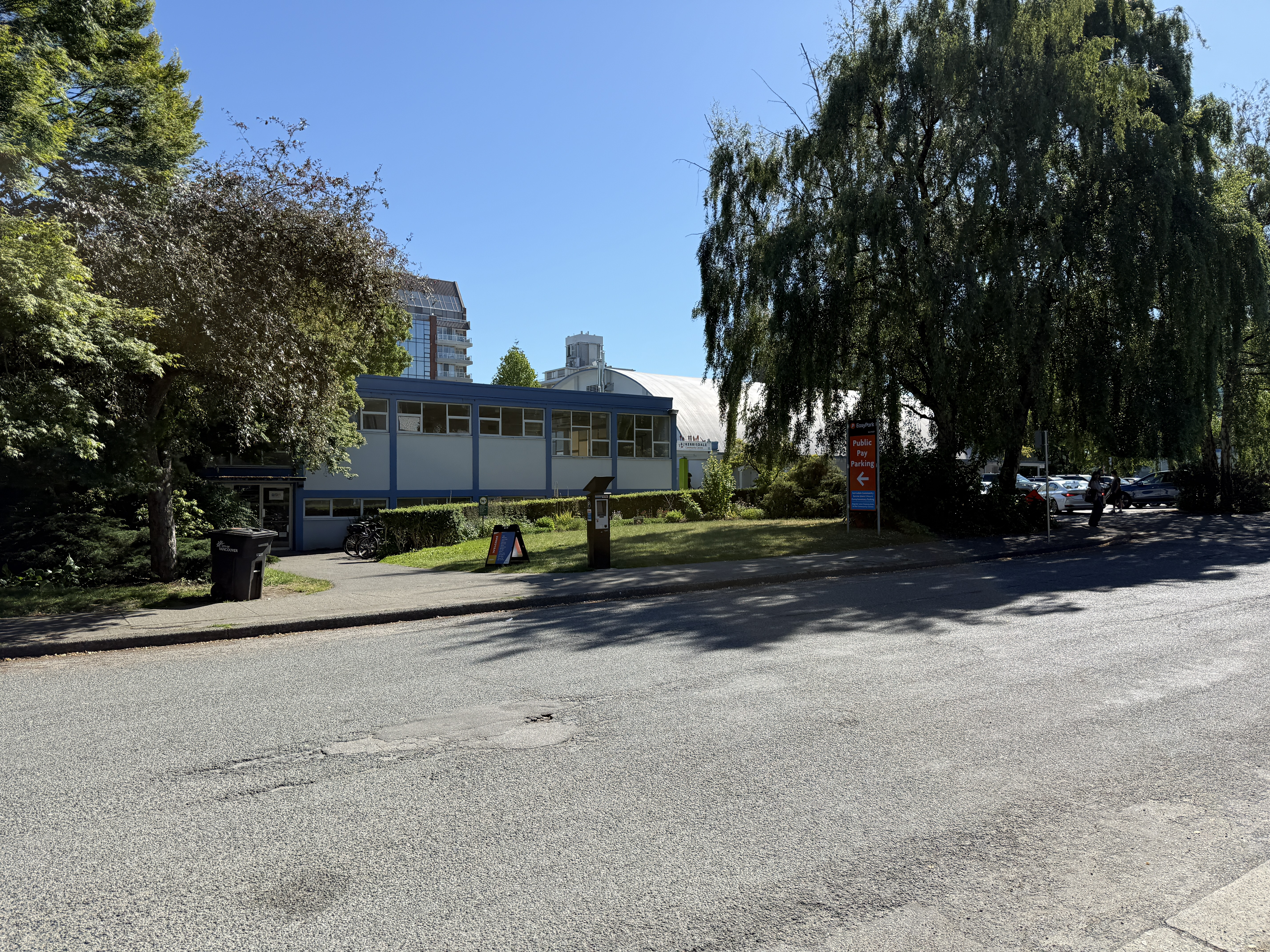
Kerrisdale Community Centre

The stretch of businesses along W. 41st Ave between Balsam and Maple streets comprise the Kerrisdale Business Association, the longest running such association in Vancouver. Member businesses pool funds for festivities and general beautification of the area, including the hiring of a full-time gardener during summer months.

The Arbutus Corridor, a no-longer-used CPR railway line which bisects the neighbourhood, has been purchased by the City of Vancouver and will be a series of community gardens, as well as a greenway for bicycles and pedestrians. The railway line has been removed and the right of way has been converted into a greenway for pedestrians and cyclists.

Kerrisdale Community Centre is home to the Kerrisdale Branch of the Vancouver Public Library, and Kerrisdale Pool.

North of 41st Avenue on East Boulevard is the Kerrisdale Cyclone Taylor Arena, built in 1949 as a hockey arena and was used as wrestling venue for 1954 British Empire and Commonwealth Games.

The Arbutus Greenway, a large path designed for bikers and pedestrians, runs North-South through the heart of Kerrisdale.

== Education ==
Kerrisdale is home to Kerrisdale Elementary School, Kerrisdale Annex, Maple Grove Elementary School, Dr. R. E. McKechnie Elementary School, and Quilchena Elementary School, as well as Magee Secondary School, Prince of Wales Secondary School and Point Grey Secondary School.

Crofton House School, a private school for girls, is on the western edge of the neighbourhood, next to Dunbar-Southlands.
