= Point Grey Secondary School =

Coordinates: 49.2370°N 123.1530°W

stəywəte:n̓ Point Grey Secondary School
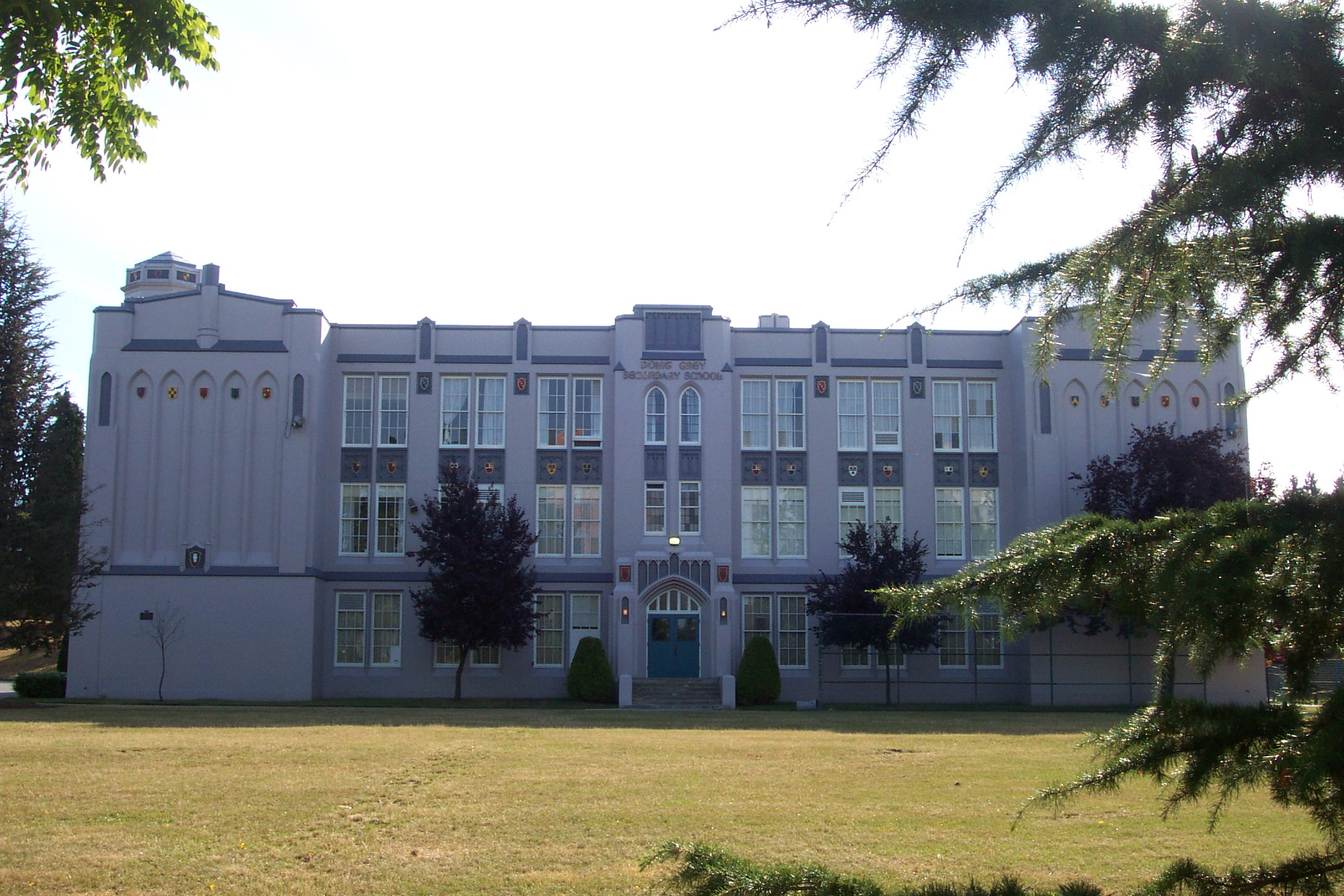
- Front of Building

Location
- 5350 East Boulevard; Vancouver, British Columbia, V6M 3V2; Canada

Information
- School type: Secondary school
- Motto: "Honor Ante Honores" (Honour Before Fame)
- Founded: 1929 as Junior High
- School board: School District 39 Vancouver
- Superintendent: Helen McGregor
- Area trustee: Joshua Zhang
- School number: 03939012
- Principal: Michelle Wood
- Grades: 8–12
- Enrollment: 1029
- Capacity: 1200
- Language: English
- Area: Kerrisdale
- Colours: Blue and Grey
- Mascot: Grey Hounds
- Team name: Point Grey Hounds
- Public transit access: R4 41st Avenue RapidBus 16, 41
- Website: pointgrey.vsb.bc.ca

stəywəte:n̓ Point Grey Secondary School (English: /stəjwəteɪn/), commonly known as Point Grey Secondary School, is a public secondary school located in the Kerrisdale and Shaughnessy neighbourhoods of Vancouver, British Columbia, Canada.

== History ==
Designed by Fred Townley and Matheson, the main building was built in 1929 in a Collegiate Gothic style. Construction of the school was commissioned by the Municipality of Point Grey prior to amalgamation with the City of Vancouver. Point Grey Secondary was built originally as a junior high school. The first students began classes in September 1929 and the building served as a junior high school until 1965 when it became a full secondary school. In 1965, a new wing was added with a gym, laboratories and a library. In 2006, Point Grey, in conjunction with the Parks Board, completed a new artificial turf field, and have upgraded the track surrounding it to a rubber surface. Point Grey also offers Advanced Placement courses in Calculus, Computer Science, and Psychology.

In 1962 Point Grey was designated a comprehensive secondary school from grade 8 to 12, as it is today. Although the school offered a full range of courses, its focus was essentially academic. Today eighty-five per cent of Point Grey's grade 12's continue on with post-secondary education.

== Feeder schools ==
For the most part, Point Grey Secondary School receives students from three elementary schools. These include Kerrisdale Elementary School, Quilchena Elementary School, and Southlands Elementary School. However, students also enroll from Talmud Torah, Emily Carr Elementary School, St. Augustine's Elementary School, Shaughnessy Elementary School, General Wolfe Elementary School, L'École Bilingue, Jules Quesnel Elementary School and also from many other private and public schools in the region and all over the Vancouver area and out of boundary.

== Campus ==
The main building, (the original building) contains most of the school's classrooms, a cafeteria, Food and Sewing Room on the first floor. The Second floor, contains the office, the Library, the Auditorium, Band room, Small Gym, Main (Big) Gym. Most Math and Art, and Tech classes are on this floor. The third floor, has classes for English, French, Japanese, Social Studies. There is also a Science Wing which contains 7 classrooms. A Drama room, Woodworks shop, and some Math, English, and Social studies classrooms are situated in the Breezeway. A school board-owned and operated tennis court is located south of the Main Gym.

== Point Grey Mini School ==
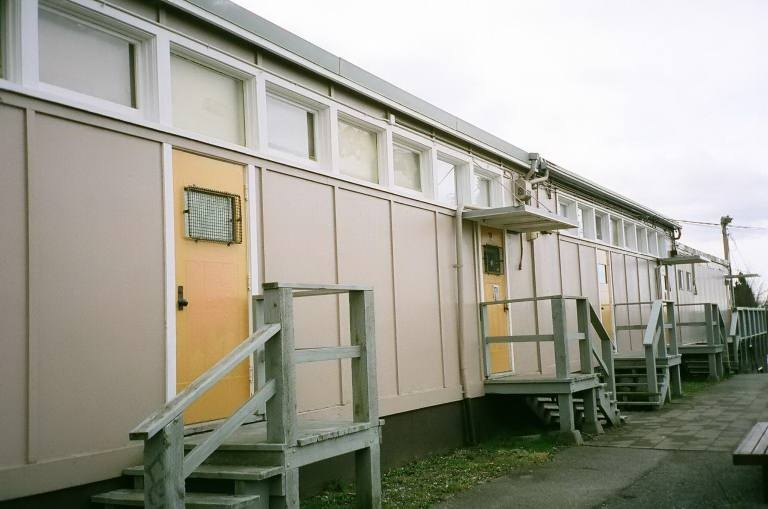
Point Grey Mini School

Founded in 1979, the mini school is a district-wide program that offers students enriched learning and social experiences in addition to the regular curriculum. Unlike the main school, all students who wish to enter the mini school program must write an entrance exam (regardless of whether or not they are in the catchment zone), and out of the many who apply, only twenty-eight individuals (14 girls and 14 boys) are chosen. Students are still considered part of the main school and take elective and language courses there. The head teacher position is currently occupied by Mr. Mori Hamilton. The students go on a variety of trips listed below:

- Grade Eight: Orientation, Manning Park Ski Trip, and Bamfield Marine Station.
- Grade Nine and Ten: Orientation, Manning Park Ski Trip, Oregon Shakespeare Festival in Ashland, Oregon, USA or Strathcona Park Lodge
- Grade Eleven and Twelve: Orientation, Manning Park Ski Trip (optional)

== Sports ==
There is a wide variety of extracurricular sports are offered throughout the year such as soccer, volleyball and skiing.

Fall season

Cross country running, girls' field hockey, boys' rugby, boys' soccer, swimming, and volleyball

Winter season

Wrestling, skiing and snowboarding, girls' ice hockey, basketball, gymnastics

Spring season

Girls' soccer, boys' volleyball, track and field, boys' rugby, ultimate, girls' softball, golf, tennis and badminton.

== In popular culture ==
- The film Superbad was based on the experiences of the film's writers Seth Rogen and Evan Goldberg when they attended Point Grey. The duo's production company, Point Grey Pictures is named after it.
- Fox's Lucifer was filmed there: the school doubled as a Korean community centre for the series.
- The CW teen drama series Riverdale is also filmed here, on the sports field beside the schools, in the auditorium, and in the hallway.
- High school scenes from the movie To All the Boys I've Loved Before and To All the Boys: P.S. I Still Love You were filmed here.
- Other productions include the third adaptation of Mostly Ghostly and TV movies One Night In Doom House starring Corey Fogelmanis, and Carrie starring Angela Bettis.
- South Korean girl group, KiiiKiii, filmed a music video for their single "Dancing Alone" at the school.

== Notable alumni ==
- Bruce Allen, music manager and radio commentator
- Gil Bellows, actor, director
- Geoff Berner, musician
- Angela Bettis, actress, film producer, and director
- Christine Boyle, BC MLA for Vancouver- Little Mountain
- Joely Collins, actress
- Simon Collins, musician
- Jessi Cruickshank, actress, MTV Canada host
- Robert Davidson, artist
- Adrian Dix, BC MLA for Vancouver-Kingsway
- Carol Baird Ellan, Chief Judge of the Provincial Court of British Columbia (2000–2005)
- Alex Ferris, actor
- Nathan Fielder, comedian, actor, writer, director, producer, commercial pilot
- James Giles, philosopher
- Evan Goldberg, screenwriter, producer
- Mark Hildreth, actor, musician
- Pan-To Barton Lui, speed skater
- Jane McGregor, actress
- Tegan Moss, actress
- Jesse Moss, actor
- Stephen Owen, politician
- Stuart Parker, politician, environmentalist
- Doreen Patterson Reitsma, sailor
- Seth Rogen, actor, comedian, scriptwriter (did not graduate)
- Arn Saba (later Katherine Collins), cartoonist and writer
- Scott Sampson, vertebrate paleontologist
- Jaime Stein, politician
- Cynthia Stevenson, actress
- Michael Turner, author
- Erin Wall, opera singer
