= Shaughnessy, Vancouver =

Coordinates: 49.245°N 123.133°W

Shaughnessy
- Neighbourhood
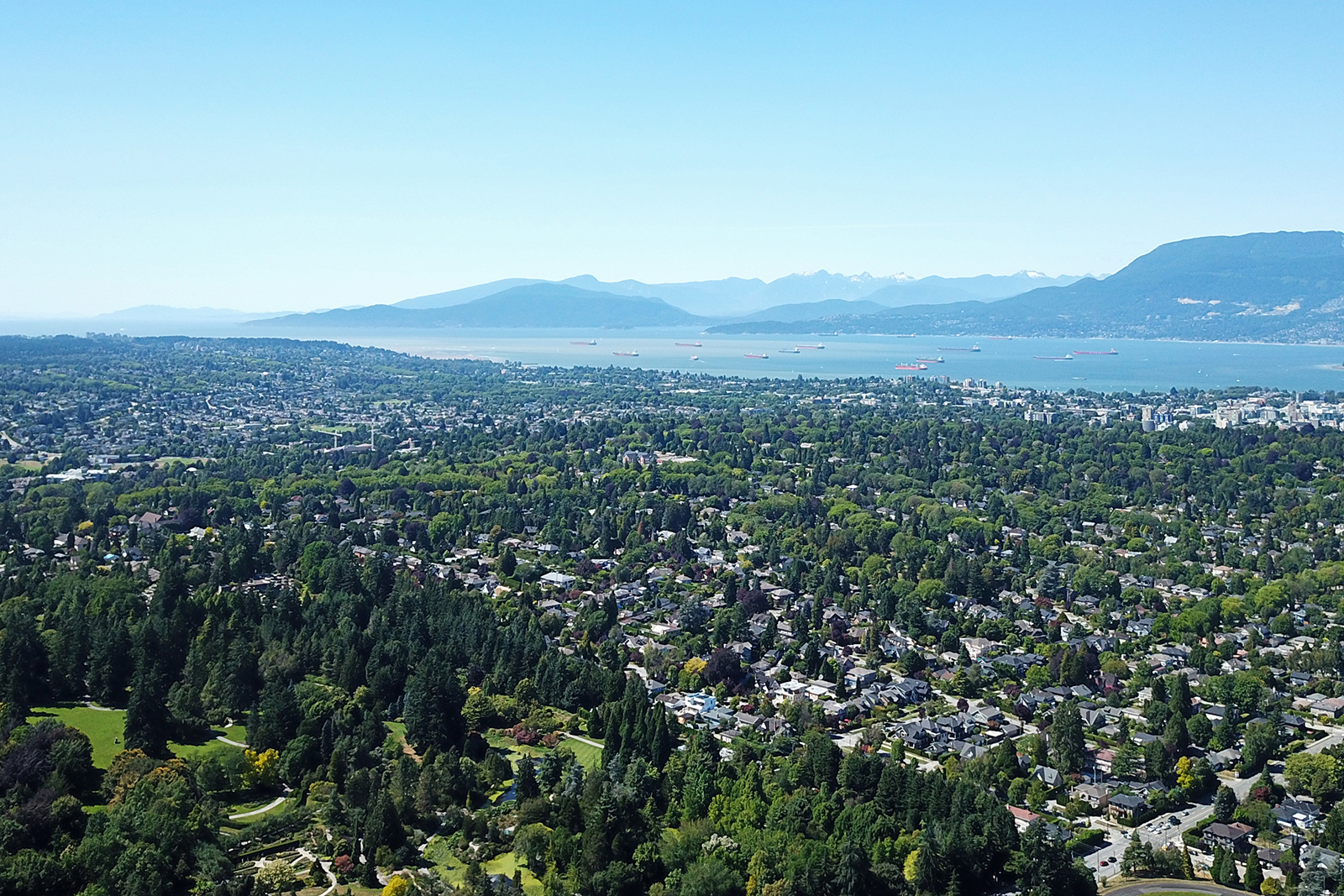
- Aerial view of Shaughnessy in 2018

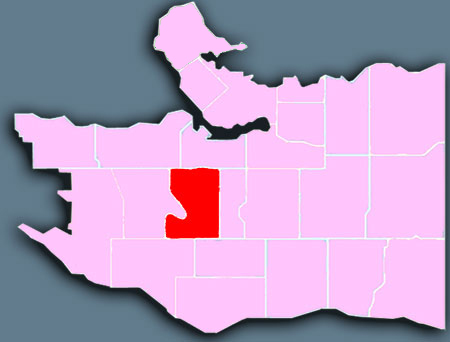
- Location of Shaughnessy in Vancouver

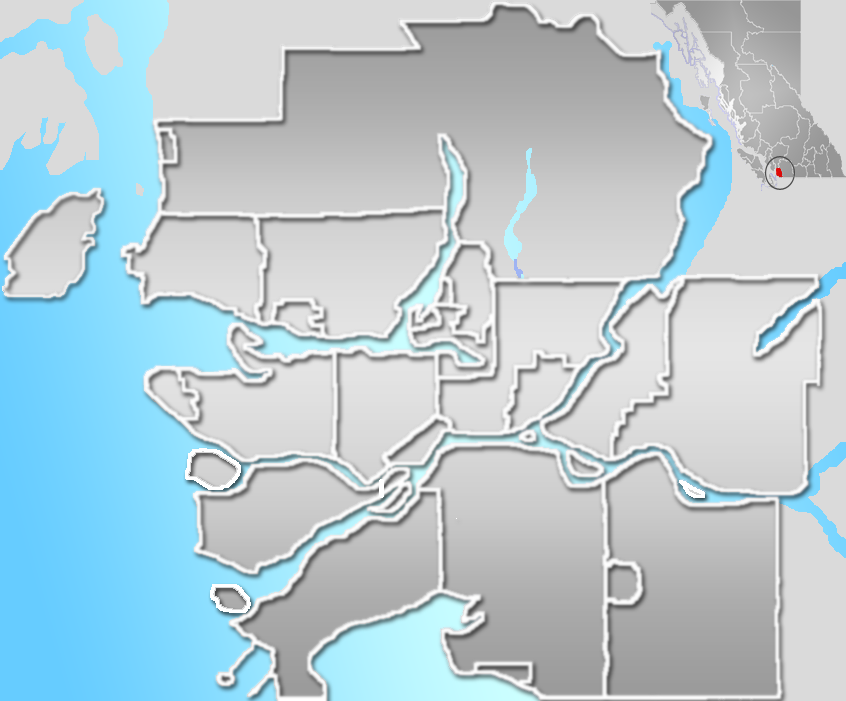
- Location in Vancouver
- Country: Canada
- Province: British Columbia
- City: Vancouver

Shaughnessy is an almost-entirely residential neighbourhood in Vancouver, British Columbia, Canada, spanning about 447 hectares in a relatively central locale. It is bordered by 16th Avenue to the north, 41st Avenue to the south, Oak Street to the east, and East Boulevard to the west. The older section of the neighbourhood, called "First Shaughnessy," is considered more prestigious and is bordered by 16th Avenue to the north, King Edward Avenue to the south, Oak Street to the east, and East Boulevard to the west. In 2016, the population was approximately 8,430. It was named after Thomas Shaughnessy, 1st Baron Shaughnessy, former president of the Canadian Pacific Railway.

The neighbourhood's residents have an average annual household income of $111,566 ($777,184 in Shaughnessy Heights) and the average house price is $2.89 million, the highest in Vancouver. It is also the site of many historical homes, especially in First Shaughnessy. Of the neighbourhood's homes 50.9% were built before or during World War II, compared with 23.3% for the city at large. This is largely due to the 1981 First Shaughnessy Official Development Plan by-law, which promotes private property ownership and single-family dwelling, while limiting property subdivision and population density.

== History ==
The neighbourhood was created in 1907 by the Canadian Pacific Railway, the largest real estate developer in Canada. It was meant as an alternative to the West End, which was the traditional home for the budding city's elite. Thanks to aggressive marketing by the railway, highly regulated development, and a stronger degree of exclusiveness, it gradually took the latter's status over the past century. Shaughnessy is known for its elegant tree-lined streets and large properties, including Glen Brae and Hycroft Manor. In First Shaughnessy, Angus Drive and Osler Street have a tree-lined median in addition to the trees along the edge of the road.

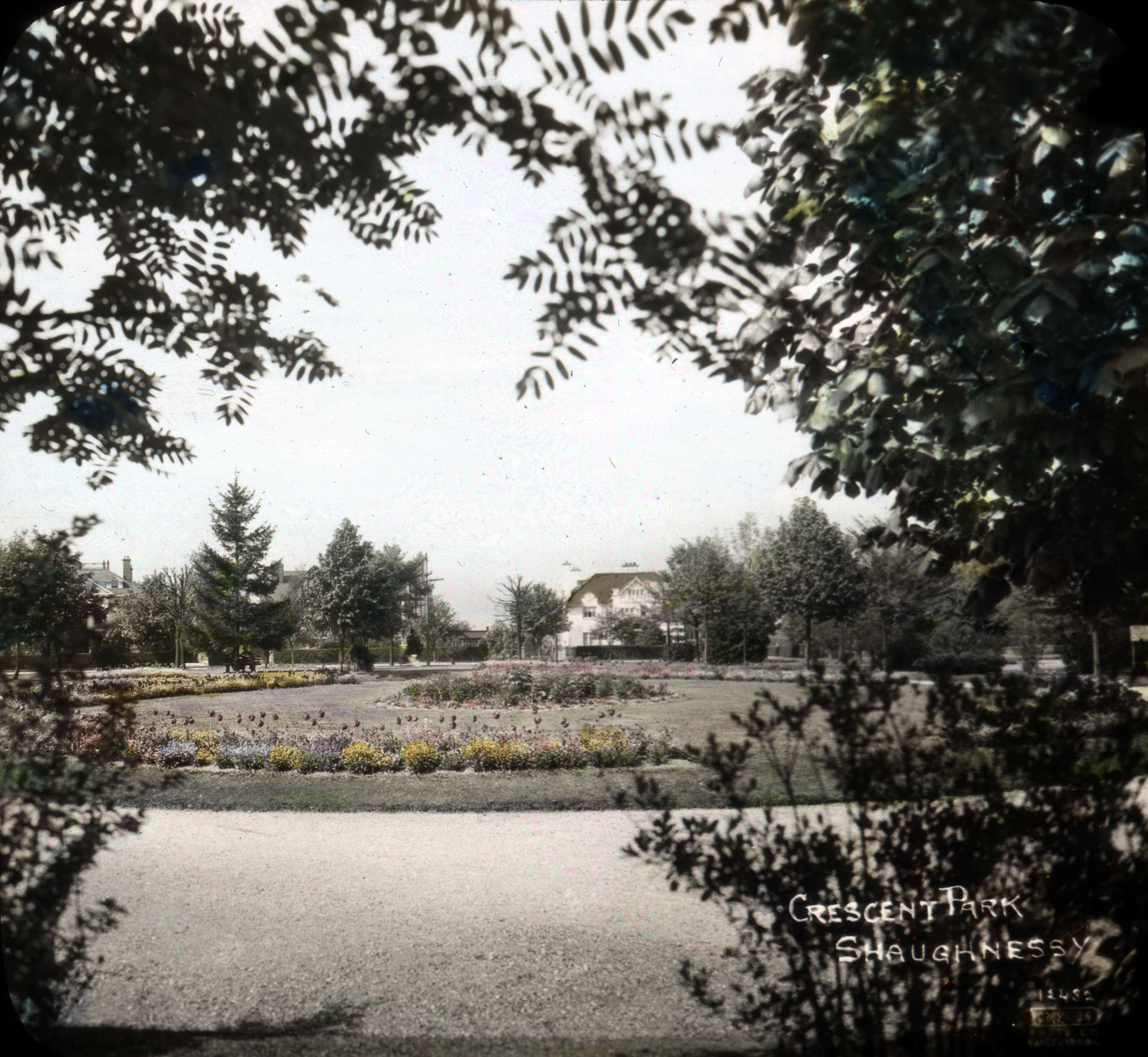
Crescent Park as seen in the 1930s

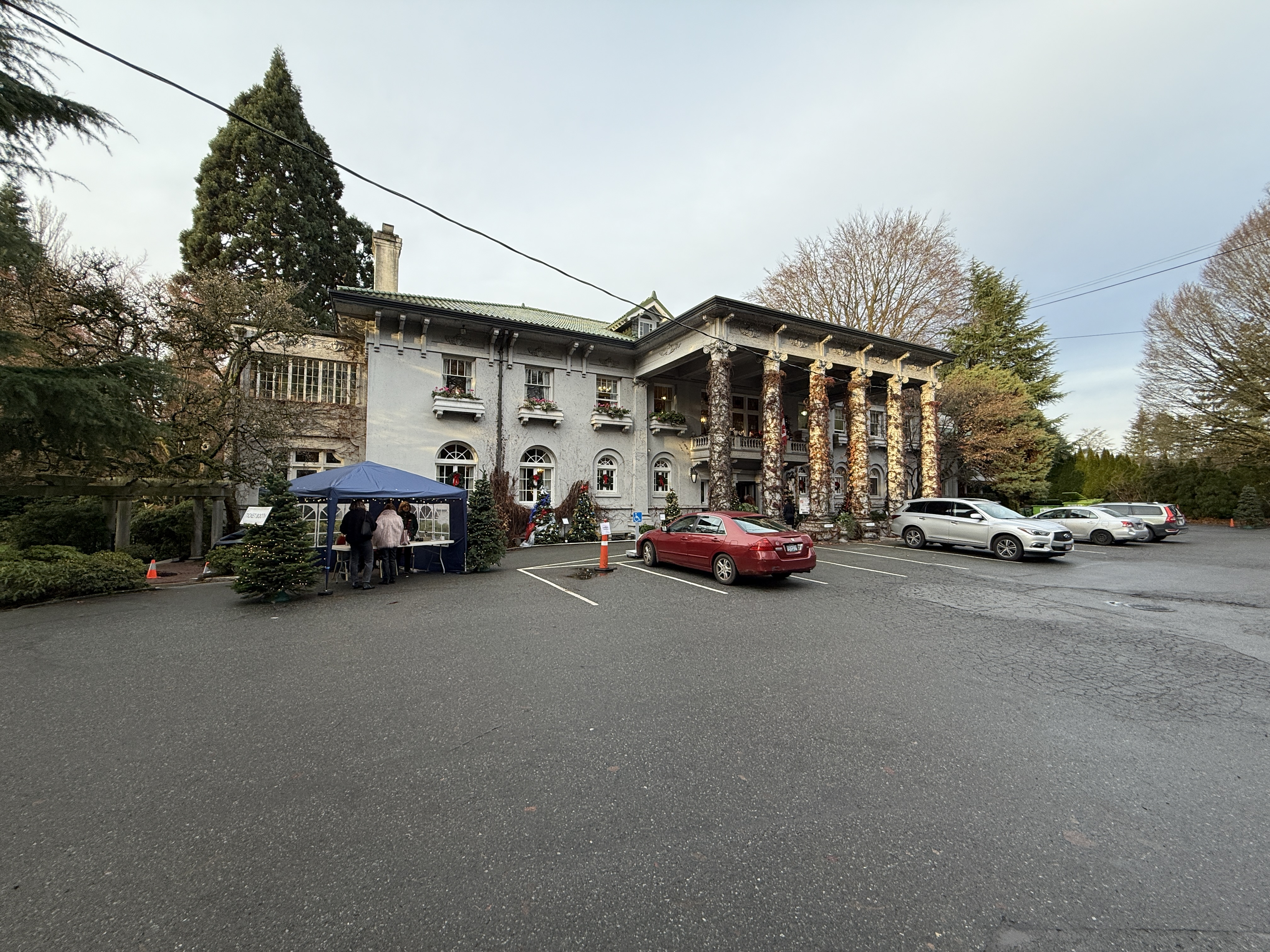
Hycroft Manor

== Demographics ==
As of 2016, Shaughnessy has 8,430 people, down 4.3% from the previous 5 years. 20.8% of the population is under the age of 20; 23.8% is between 20 and 39; 34% is between 40 and 64; and 21.6% is 65 or older. 51.8% of Shaughnessy residents speak English as a first language, 32.3% speak Chinese, less than 5% speak Tagalog, Korean, Spanish and French. The median household income is $111,566 and 15.5% of its population lives in low-income households. The unemployment rate is 4.7%.

Panethnic groups in the Shaughnessy neighbourhood (2001−2016)
Panethnic group	2016		2006		2001	
Panethnic group	Pop.	%	Pop.	%	Pop.	%
European (Note: Statistic includes all persons that did not make up part of a visible minority or an indigenous identity.)	3,600	45.06%	5,050	57.91%	5,305	60.56%
East Asian (Note: Statistic includes total responses of "Chinese", "Korean", and "Japanese" under visible minority section on census.)	3,555	44.49%	2,945	33.77%	2,970	33.9%
South Asian	270	3.38%	235	2.69%	135	1.54%
Southeast Asian (Note: Statistic includes total responses of "Filipino" and "Southeast Asian" under visible minority section on census.)	210	2.63%	280	3.21%	185	2.11%
Middle Eastern (Note: Statistic includes total responses of "West Asian" and "Arab" under visible minority section on census.)	75	0.94%	65	0.75%	20	0.23%
Latin American	65	0.81%	15	0.17%	25	0.29%
Indigenous	65	0.81%	25	0.29%	10	0.11%
African	50	0.63%	20	0.23%	30	0.34%
Other/Multiracial (Note: Statistic includes total responses of "Visible minority, n.i.e." and "Multiple visible minorities" under visible minority section on census.)	105	1.31%	80	0.92%	85	0.97%
Total responses	7,990	94.78%	8,720	97.98%	8,760	97.12%
Total population	8,430	100%	8,900	100%	9,020	100%
Note: Totals greater than 100% due to multiple origin responses

== Education ==
Shaughnessy is home to Little Flower Academy, Vancouver College, and York House School. The public elementary schools are Shaughnessy Elementary and Quilchena Elementary. There is one public high school in Shaughnessy, Point Grey Secondary. The neighbourhood is in the catchment area of each of Eric Hamber Secondary School, in Oakridge, or Prince of Wales Secondary School, in Arbutus Ridge.

== Parks ==
Shaughnessy has five parks, including Shaughnessy Park, formally known as Crescent Park, and Angus Park in First Shaughnessy. The other three parks in Shaughnessy are Devonshire Park, Kerrisdale Park, and VanDusen Botanical Garden, located between 33rd and 41st Avenues. The Arbutus Greenway, purchased by the City of Vancouver from Canadian Pacific Railway, stretches along the western border of Shaughnessy from 41st Avenue to 16th Avenue.

== Sources ==
- Alexander, D. (1998). Learning from Shaughnessy: The role of design guidelines in adjudicating community conflicts. Vancouver: Social Change Institute. Retrieved from VIUSpace
