= Kerrisdale Arena =

Sporting venue in Vancouver, Canada

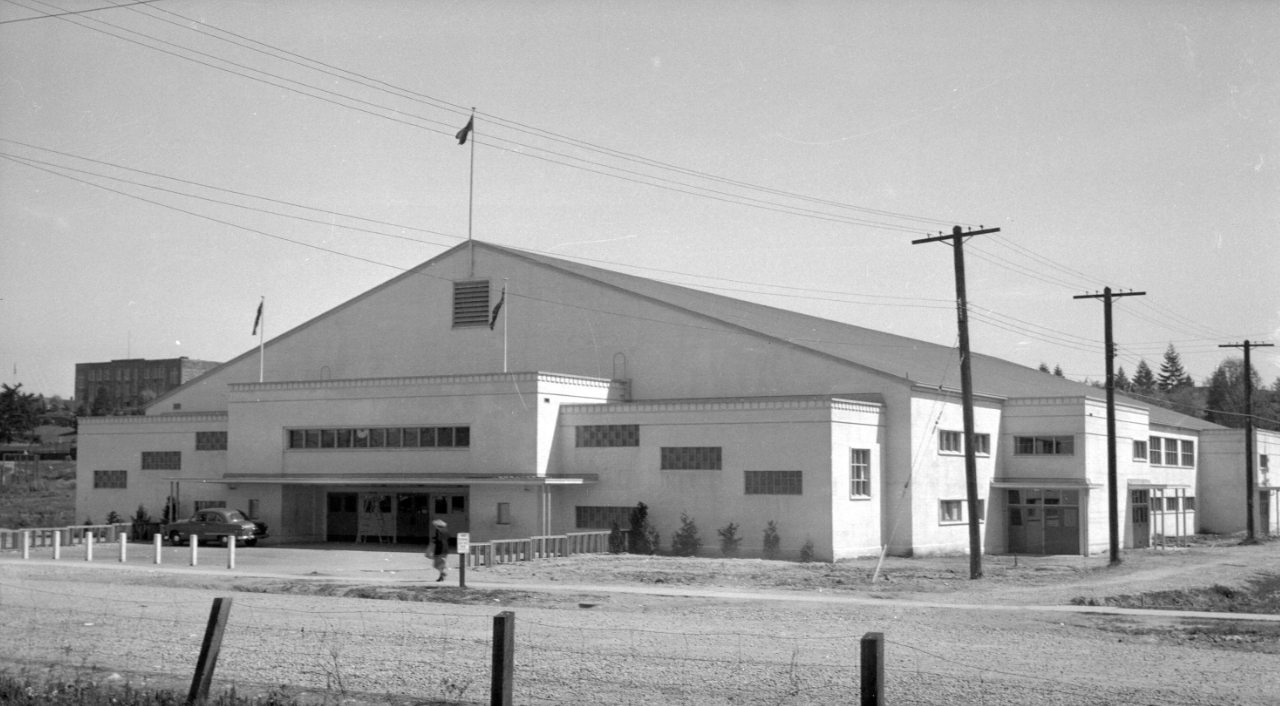
- The stadium in 1950, shortly after completion
- Interactive map of Kerrisdale Arena
- Location: East Boulevard, Kerrisdale, Vancouver, Canada

Construction
- Opened: start 1949; 77 years ago

The Kerrisdale Arena today called the Kerrisdale Cyclone Taylor Arena is a multi-purpose facility on East Boulevard, Kerrisdale, Vancouver, Canada.

== History ==
Situated on East Boulevard, the arena was built in 1949 as a hockey arena. Ice hockey player Cyclone Taylor was instrumental in raising funds for the $400,000 project and the venue opened in November 1949.

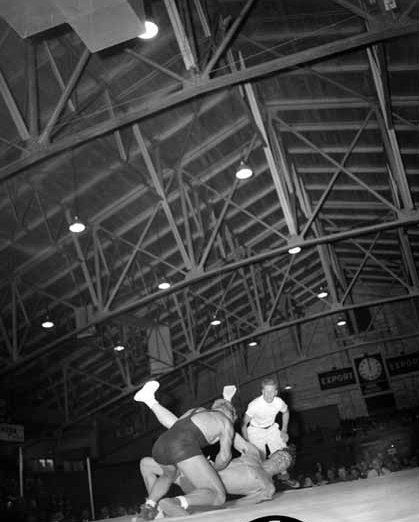
Wrestling at the Kerrisdale Arena during the 1954 British Empire and Commonwealth Games. Attribution:Province newspaper

The arena played host to the wrestling events during the 1954 British Empire and Commonwealth Games.

Vancouver's first rock concert took place at the arena on 27 June 1956, when Bill Haley and the Comets played. The venue later hosted acts such as Ozzy Osbourne, The Yardbirds, The Mothers of Invention and Motörhead. During the summer lacrosse, basketball, and wrestling took place at the arena. Ice hockey teams, the Kerrisdale Monarchs (Vancouver Wheelers) played at the arena in the 1950s and the Vancouver Nats used the arena during the 1971-72 and 1972-73 seasons.

Today the arena serves two purposes, as an ice skating and ice hockey arena for seven months of the year and in winter and as an indoor playground from April to August.
