= Dealers (TV series) =

- Presented by: Adam Shaw
- Country of origin: United Kingdom
- No. of series: 1
- No. of episodes: 7

Production
- Production company: Fever Media

Original release
- Network: Discovery Channel
- Release: 16 April – 28 May 2012

Dealers is a British reality television series produced by Fever Media for the Discovery Channel. The show, hosted by Adam Shaw, premiered on 16 April 2012. The premise of the series is for members of the public to attempt to sell their family heirlooms, fine art, jewellery, collectibles and antiques to a group of five professional dealers.

The dealers include antiques dealer Scott Diament; Jenny Pat, a Canadian television personality and former Chinese painting specialist at Christie's International Auction House in Hong Kong; Richard Gauntlett, a Pimlico Road gallery owner with expertise in 20th-century art and antique cars; Nik Robinson, a pawnbroker specialising in diamonds, jewels, fine art, and antiques; and Gillian Anderson Price, the owner of Judith Michael & Daughter Vintage Treasures, a London vintage boutique.

== Episodes ==
No.	Title	Original release date
1	"Episode One"	April 16, 2012
Items assessed included a 200-million-year-old plesiosaur fossil; a post-war diamond watch; an artefact from a Moon landing determined to be tainted; and a collection of African masks.
2	"Episode Two"	April 23, 2012
Items assessed included some space rocks; an imperial Russian helmet; artwork from a Picasso contemporary; and some Coco Chanel costume jewellery.
3	"Episode Three"	April 30, 2012
Items assessed included a 600-year-old Samurai sword; a collection of X-Men comic books; a Qing dynasty wedding chair; and models from the Aardman Animations feature film Chicken Run.
4	"Episode Four"	May 7, 2012
Items assessed included a Penny Farthing bicycle; a 10,000-year-old woolly mammoth fossil; some Damien Hirst artworks; and a Rolex watch dating from the Second World War.
5	"Episode Five"	May 14, 2012
Items assessed included a signed print by the sculptor Henry Moore; four copies of the Daily Mirror covering the immediate aftermath of the Titanic disaster; a family heirloom from the Caucasus; and an antique chess set.
6	"Episode Six"	May 21, 2012
Items assessed included a Christmas card signed by and artwork created by David Bowie; a convertible Rolls-Royce Silver Cloud; two Japanese netsukes; and a pair of candlesticks owned by Marilyn Monroe.
7	"Episode Seven"	May 28, 2012
Items assessed included a collection of vintage Playboy Magazines; an historic pocket watch; a Faberge diamond egg; and a pair of sunglasses, Stetson hat, and piano stool all belonging to Elton John.
