= Jenny Pat =

Chinese-Canadian international art dealer, visual artist and television personality

- 傅蕾蕾
- Born: Pat Lui Lui (畢蕾蕾); August 8, 1981; Hong Kong
- Died: December 29, 2014 (aged 33); Tai Po, Hong Kong
- Other name: 傅雅一
- Occupations: Art dealer, Visual artist, Television presenter
- Years active: 1999-2014
- Television: "What's On", "Dealers"

Jenny Pat
- Traditional Chinese: 傅蕾蕾
- Simplified Chinese: 傅蕾蕾
Transcriptions
Standard Mandarin
- Hanyu Pinyin: Fù Lěilei
Yue: Cantonese
- Yale Romanization: Fu^{6} Leui^{5} Leui^{5}

Also known as
- Chinese: 傅雅一
Transcriptions
Standard Mandarin
- Hanyu Pinyin: Fù Yǎyī
Yue: Cantonese
- Yale Romanization: Fu^{6} Nga^{5} Yat^{1}

Second alternative Chinese name
- Chinese: 畢蕾蕾
Transcriptions

Jenny Pat (August 8, 1981 – December 29, 2014) was a Hong Kong-born, Chinese-Canadian international art dealer, visual artist, and television personality known for her work on the Discovery Channel series, Dealers.

== Personal life and career ==
Jenny Pat was born in Hong Kong on 8 August 1981, and moved to Vancouver in 1995. She was the daughter of William Pat, and Fu Yixuan, second daughter of the renowned modern Chinese painter Fu Baoshi. Like her grandfather and the rest of her family, she was a visual artist and an art specialist.

Studied in Maryknoll Convent School (Hong Kong), and Prince of Wales Secondary School (Vancouver), she graduated from the University of British Columbia (Vancouver) in Asian Art History. Her first television appearance was at the age of 4, on a Hong Kong local kids program with TVB. While in Vancouver, Pat starred in numerous television and stage productions. She auditioned to become a television presenter for Fairchild TV in 1998 and became an on-air weather reporter shortly after. Two years later, Fairchild Television producers invited her to host their longest running program, "What's On (熒幕八爪娛)". In 2012, Pat was invited by Discovery Channel to partake in their new television series titled Dealers as one of the five top dealers that assess and bid for art works and collectables brought in by the public.

She worked for Christie's Auction house's Chinese Paintings Department as a specialist, helping the auction house in a few memorable sales of her grandfather's works. As of January 2011, Christie's still holds Fu Baoshi's world record at US$9 million (70.1 million HKD).

== Death ==
It was reported that Pat was found unconscious in her Tai Po home on December 29, 2014. She was pronounced dead upon arrival at the hospital. The cause of death was an accidental overdose of flu and other prescription psychotropic medications. Pat had been preparing for an upcoming art exhibition in Beijing. She was 33 years old.
