= Hycroft Manor =

Mansion in Vancouver, British Columbia

Coordinates: 49°15′26″N 123°08′12″W

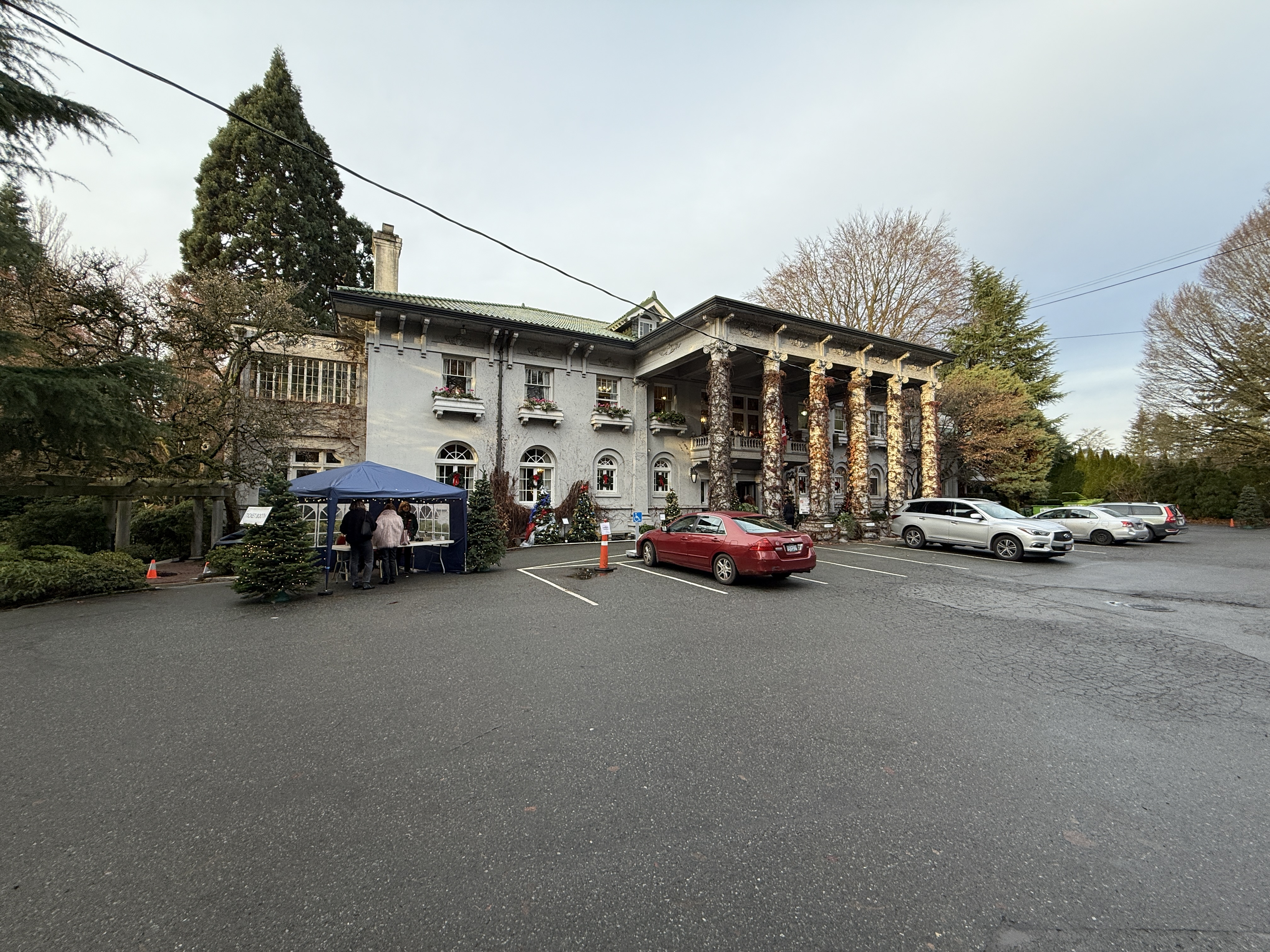
Exterior of the building

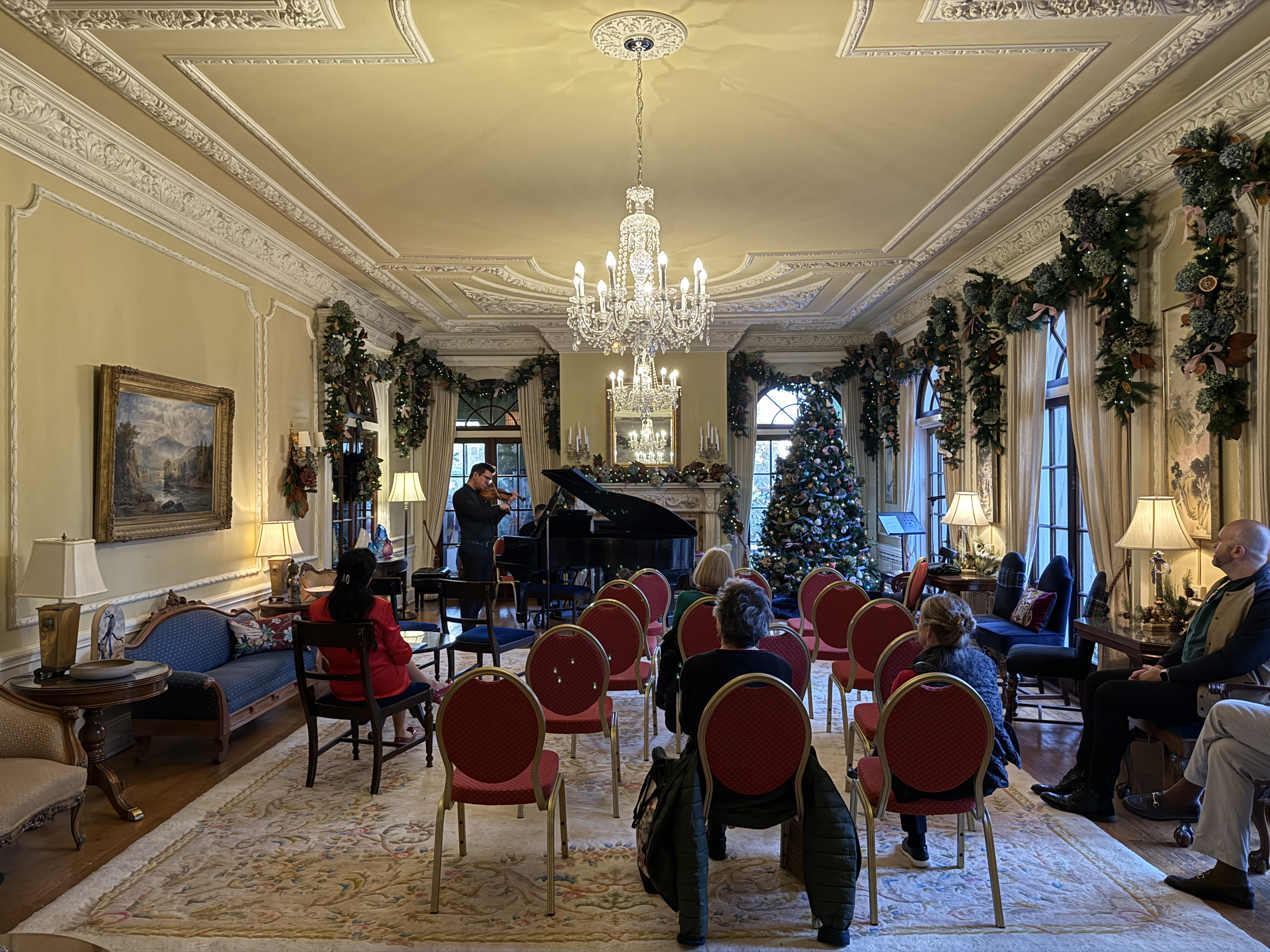
Drawing Room in Main level

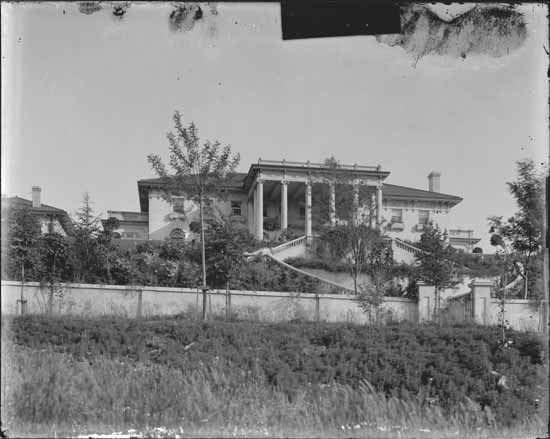
Building in 1912

Hycroft is a mansion in the Shaughnessy district of Vancouver. It was designed and built in 1909–12 by Thomas Hooper for Alexander Duncan McRae who was a businessman, farmer, politician and soldier. The internal plasterwork was sculpted by Charles Marega. During the Second World War, it was donated by McRae to be used as a hospital for wounded soldiers. In 1962, it was bought by the Canadian Federation of University Women who renovated it to be clubhouse, University Women's Club of Vancouver.

== Gallery ==
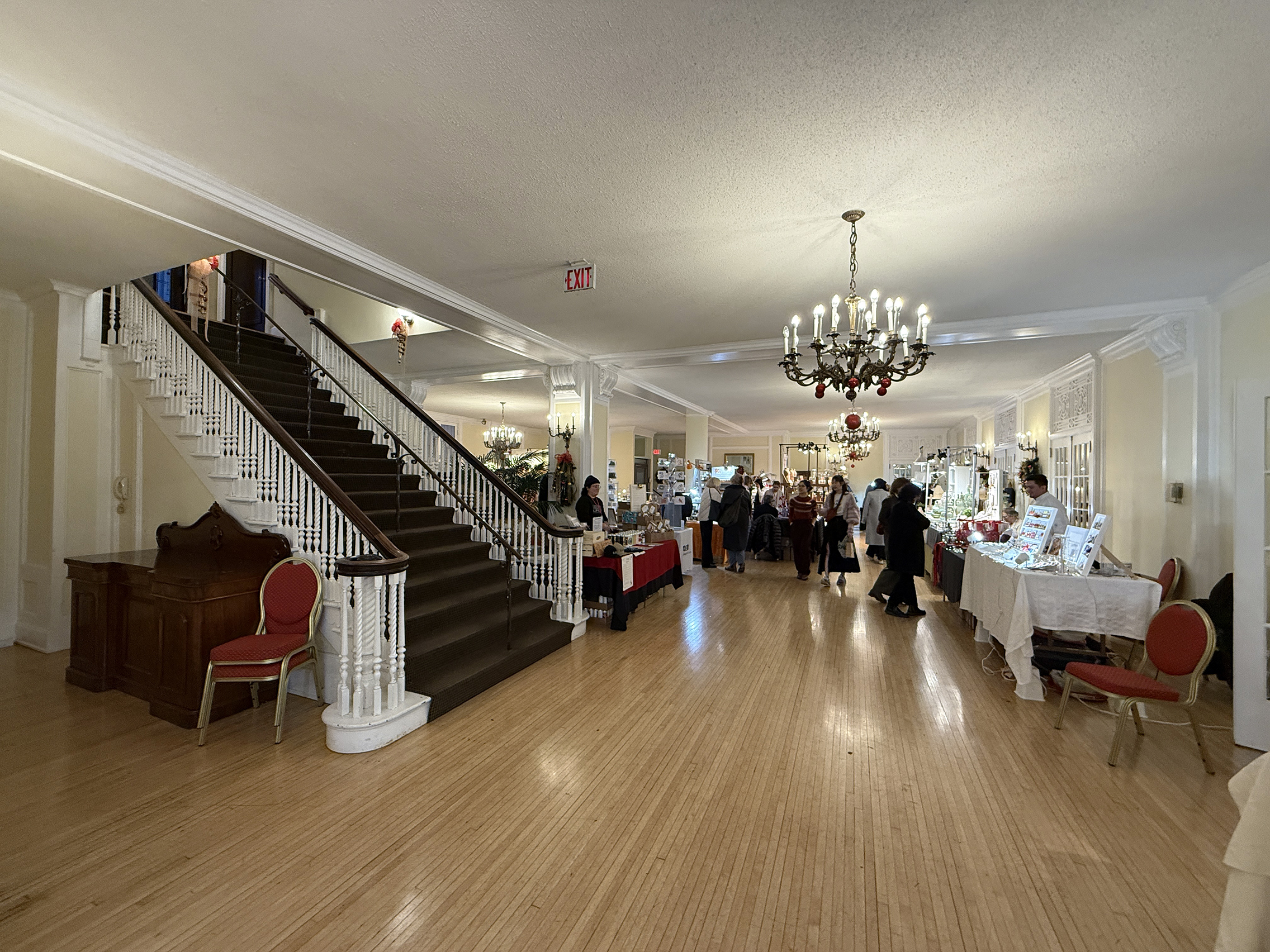
Ballroom in Lower Level

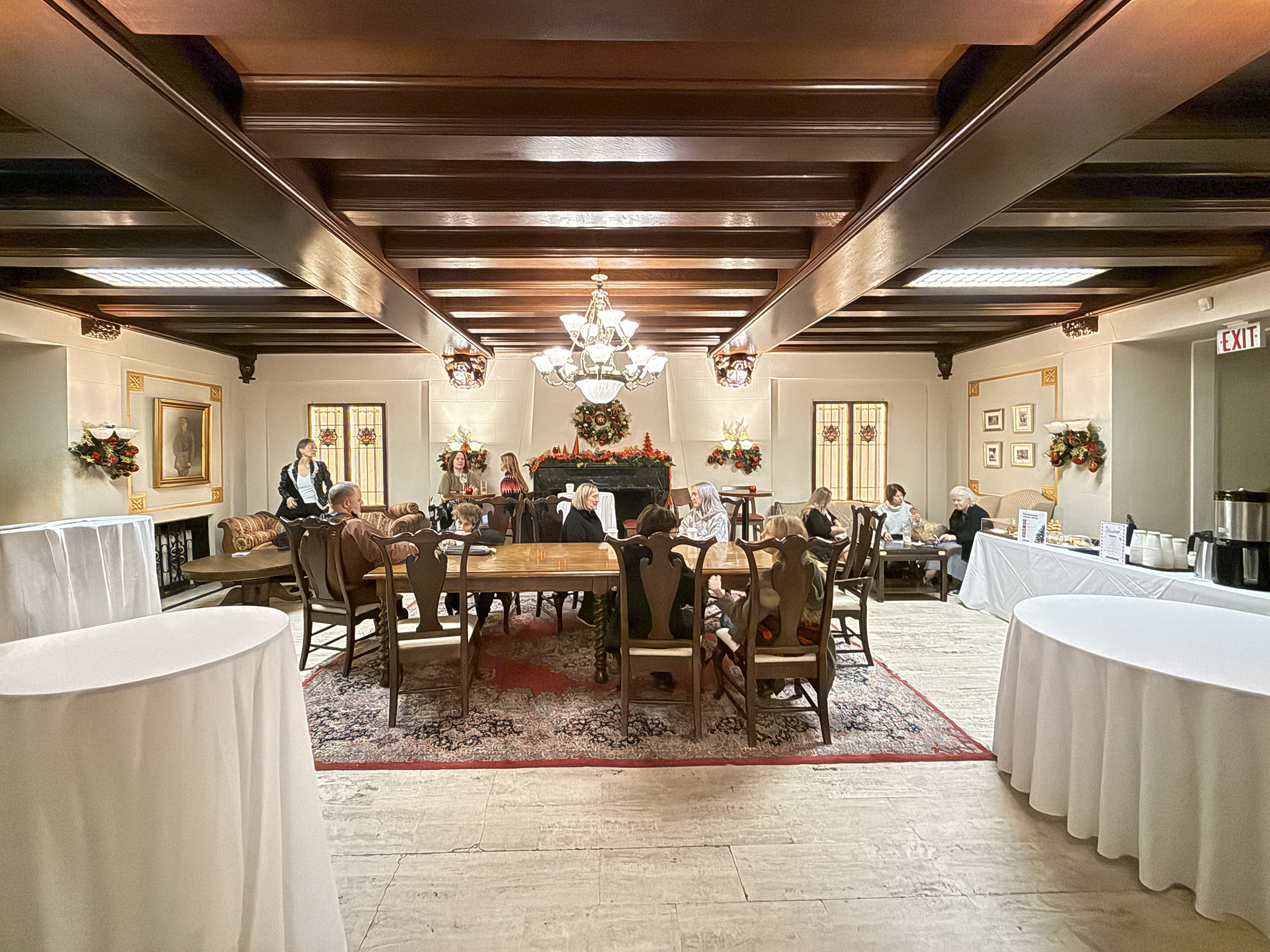
Mcare Lounge in Lower Level

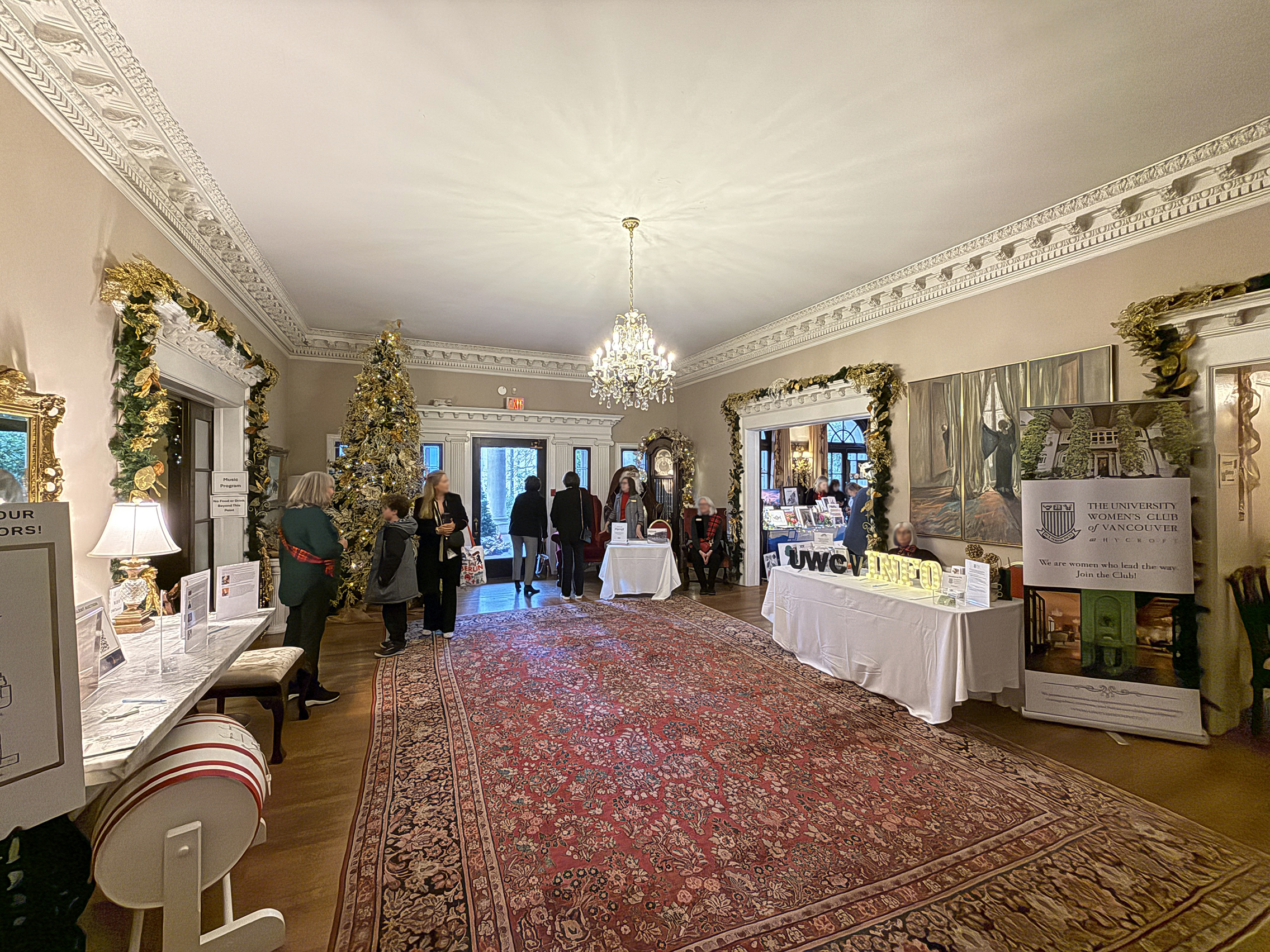
Front Hall in Main level

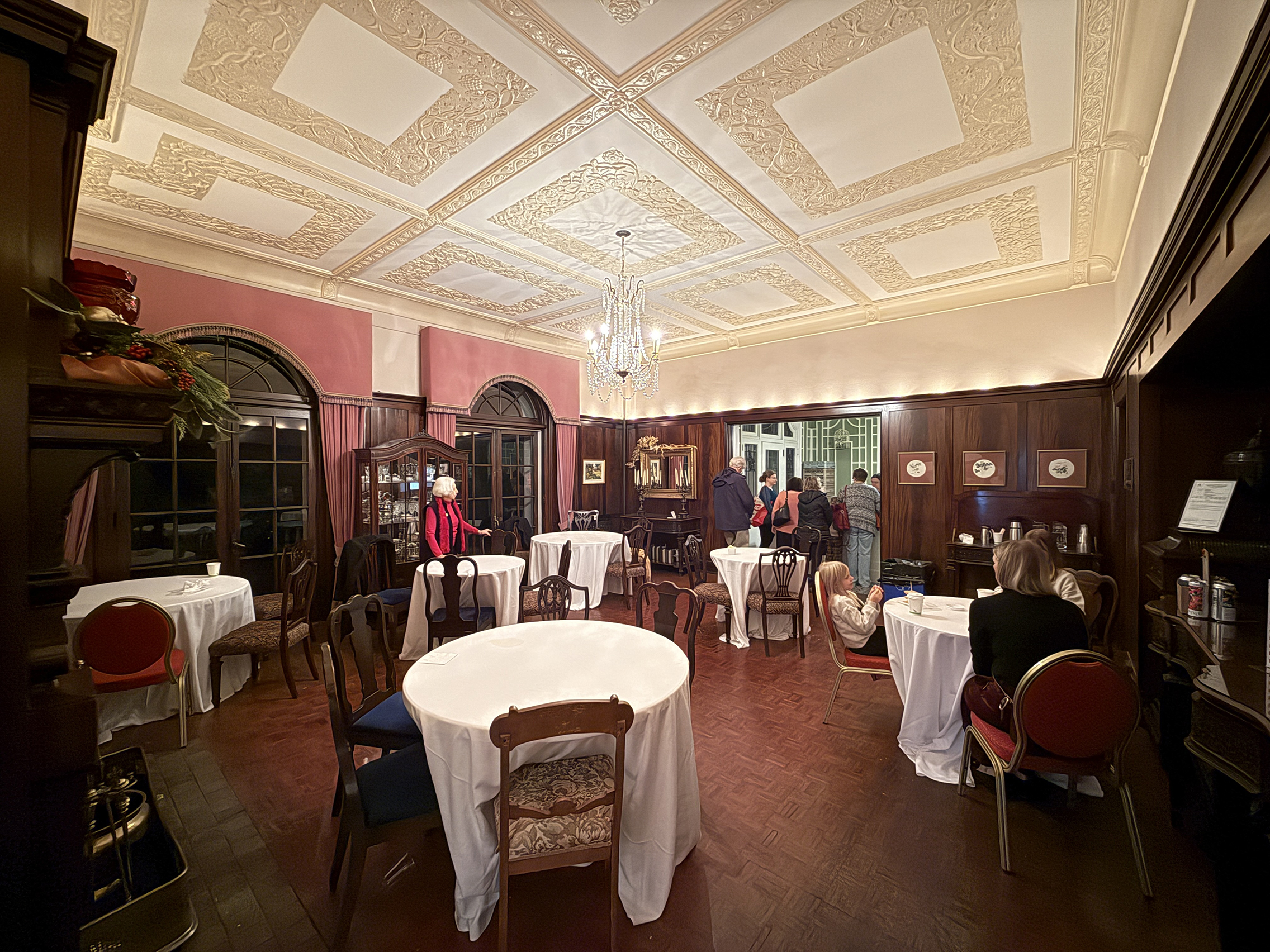
Dining Room in Main level

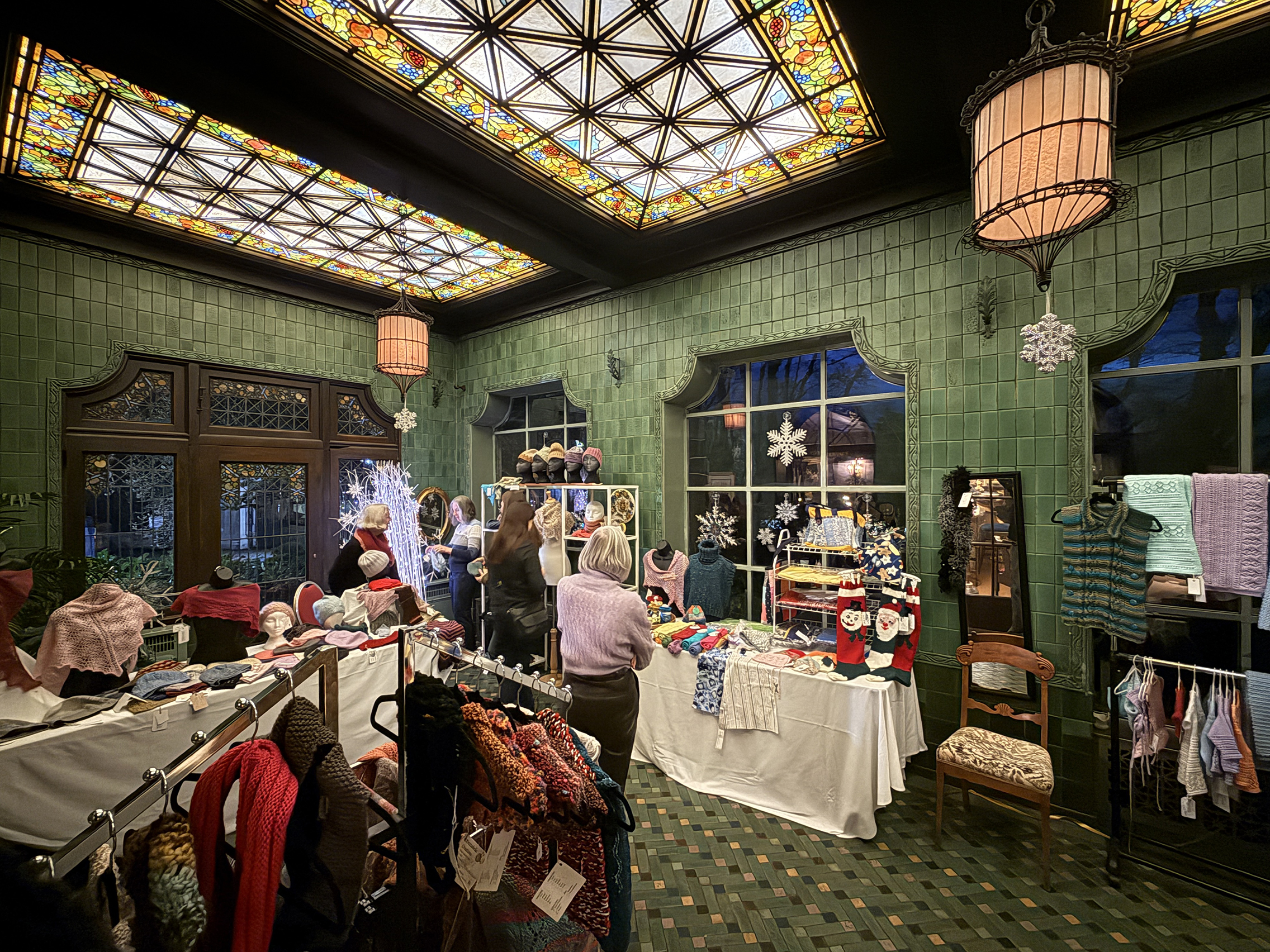
Green Solarium in Main level

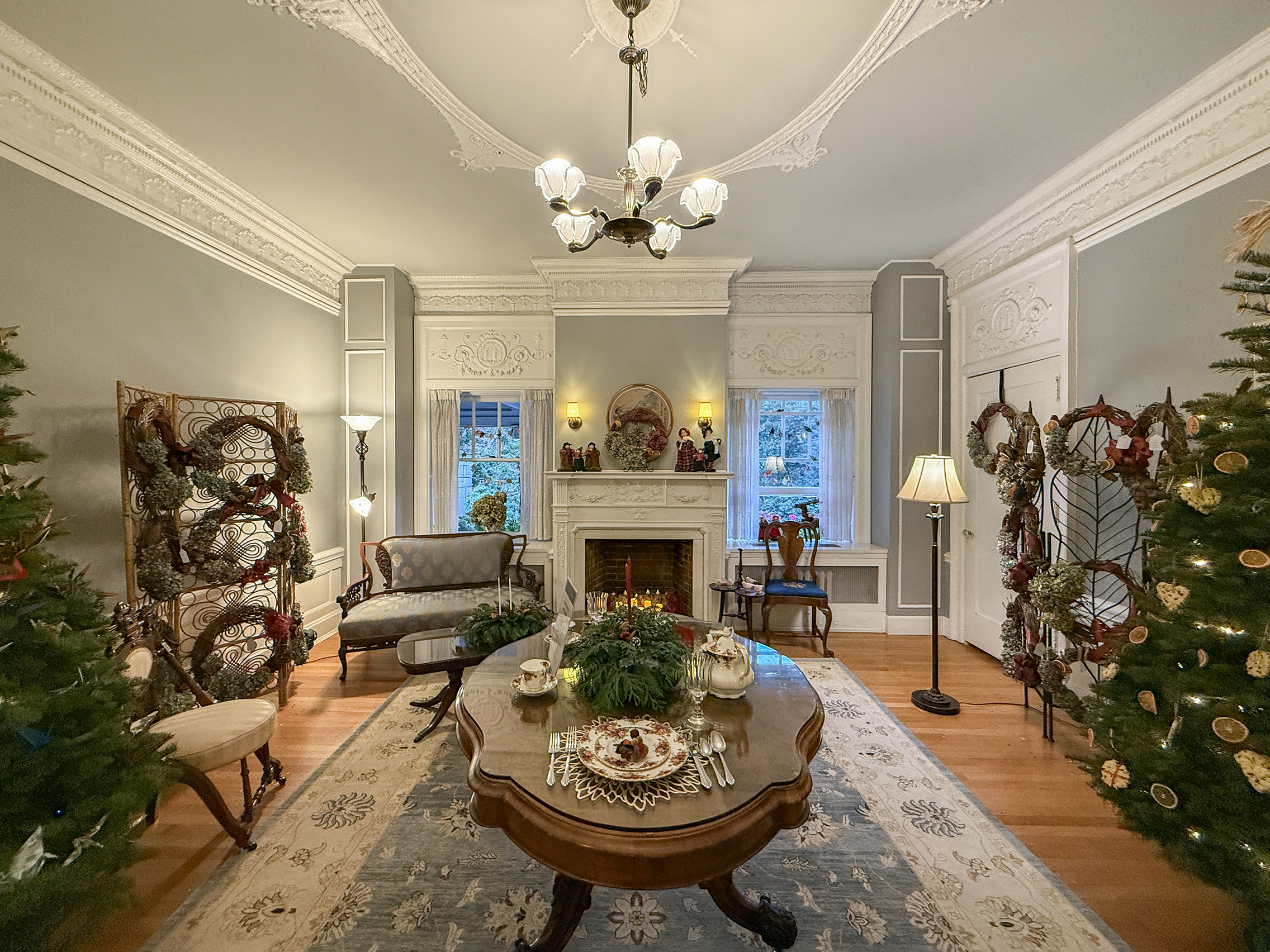
Ames Room in Upper level

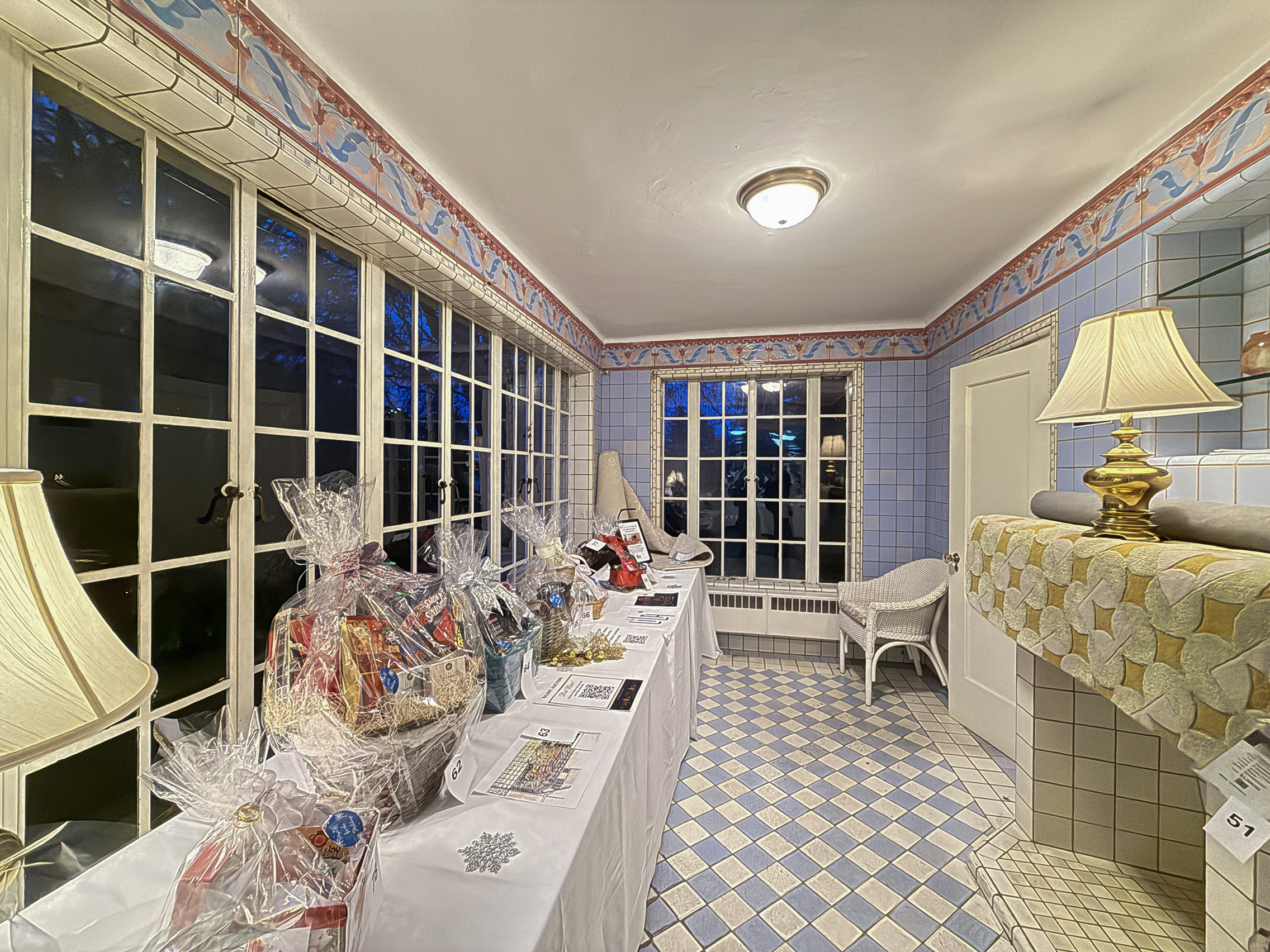
Solarium in Upper level

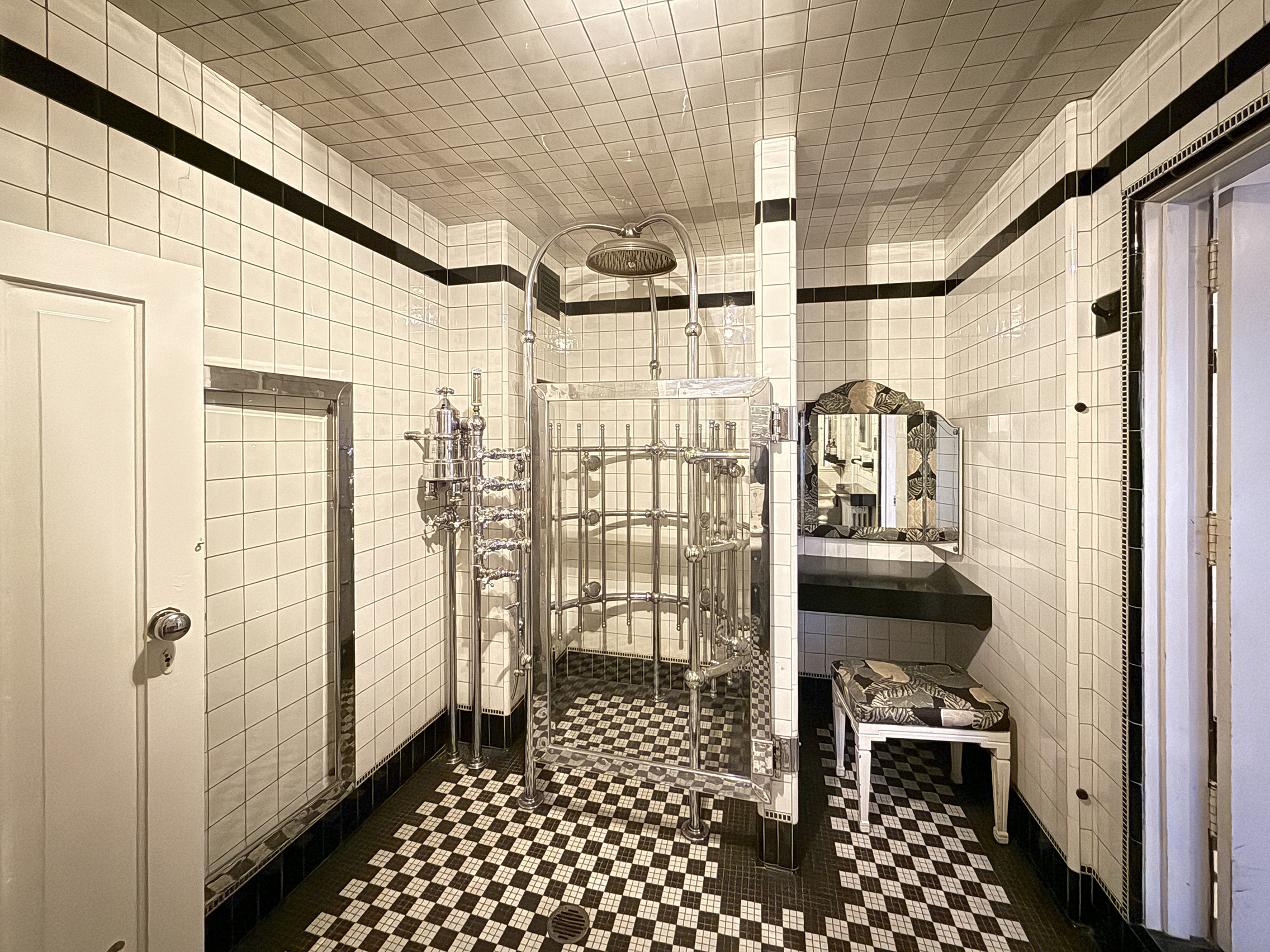
General Bathroom in Upper level
