= Maywood, Burnaby =

Neighourhood in Burnaby, British Columbia

Coordinates: 49.227°N 123.008°W

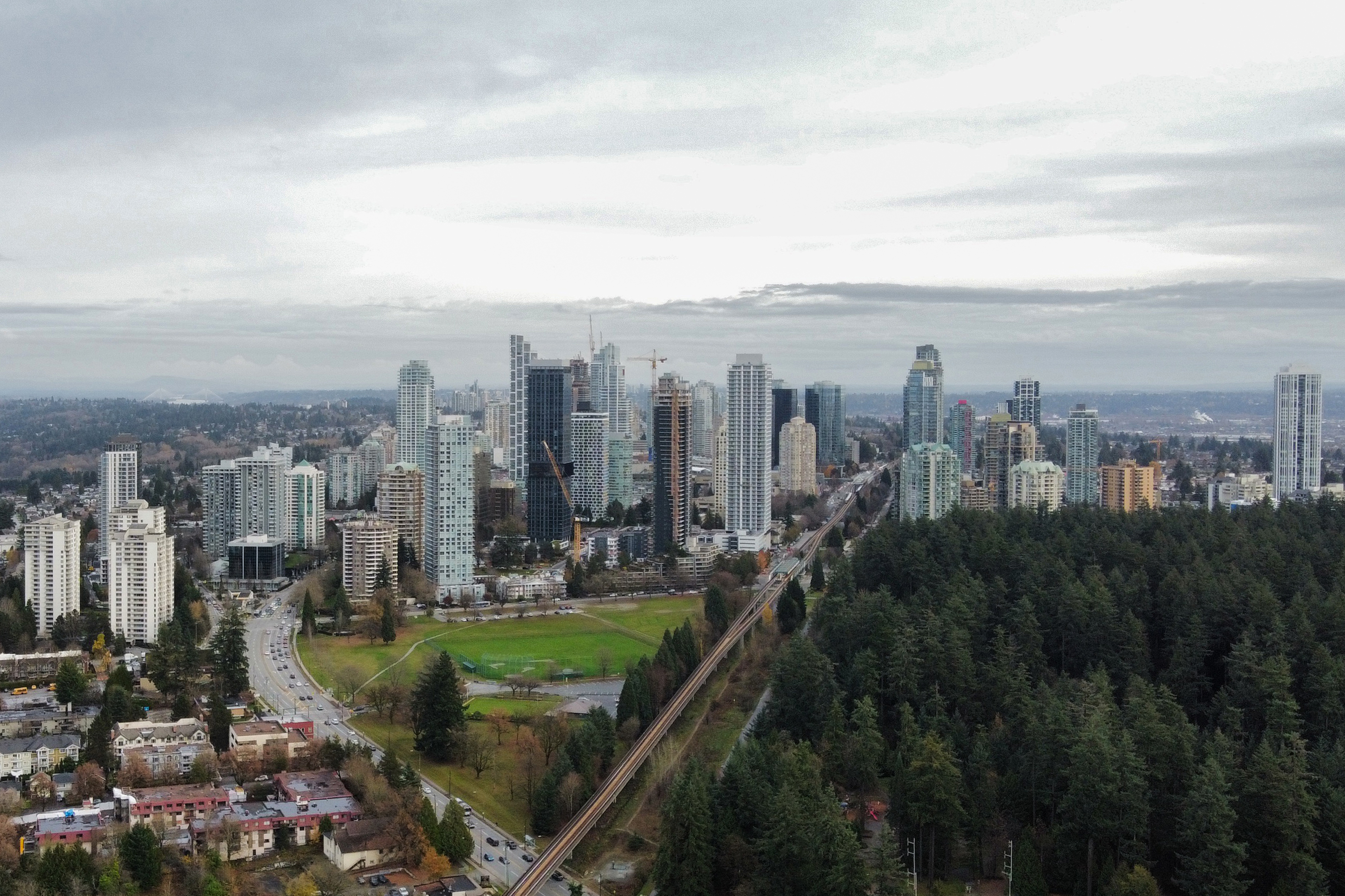
Aerial view of Maywood, Burnaby in 2025

Maywood is a mainly-rental low-income residential neighbourhood in Burnaby, and is a part of the larger Metrotown area. The neighbourhood consists of low-rise apartments built during the population boom in the Metrotown area in the 1970s, and 1980s, although the neighbourhood is quickly changing with numerous highrises. Geographically, the Maywood neighbourhood's boundaries are Grange Street and Kingsway to the north, Nelson Avenue and Bennett and Bonsor Streets to the east, Imperial Street to the south and Boundary Road to the west, and it includes Central Park.

According to the 2006 census Maywood has 15,390 people, and is a fast growing immigrant neighbourhood. Maywood takes its name from the elementary school located within it. Maywood has a large Chinese Canadian and Filipino Canadian population.

== Schools ==
- Maywood Community School (K-7)

== Shopping and attractions ==
Due to Maywood's location it enjoys much shopping space such as Metropolis at Metrotown the second-largest indoor shopping mall in Canada, Crystall mall which is a Chinese-themed mall, and Station Square Shopping Centre. It also has Central Park, the Burnaby Public Library, and local parks.

== Transportation ==
Maywood is mainly served by Metrotown station, but also Patterson station in central park. It is also served by the Metrotown bus loop, located on Central Boulevard

Bay	Routes	Additional information
1		Unloading only
2	19 Stanley Park	Trolley bus service
3	430 Richmond–Brighouse Station	Express
4	130 Phibbs Exchange / Kootenay Loop / To Pender	
5	222 Phibbs Exchange	Peak hours only
6	119 Edmonds Station	
6	129 Holdom Station	Limited service
7	31 River District	
8	146 Suncrest	
8	147 Edmonds Station	
10		Unloading only
11	49 UBC	Articulated bus service
12	116 Edmonds Station	
12	116 Edmonds Station	
13	144 SFU	
14	110 Lougheed Station	
