= Prince of Wales Secondary School =

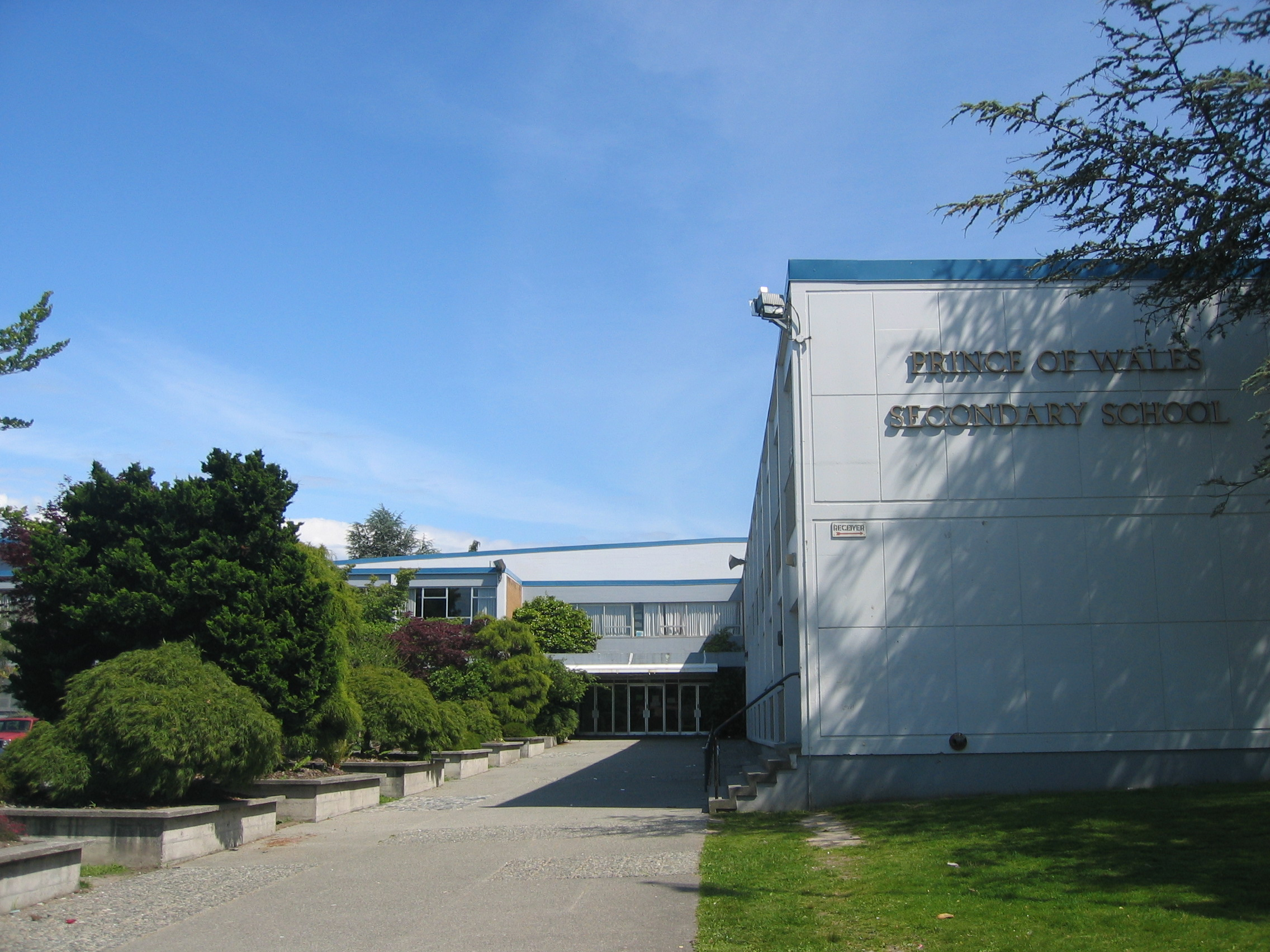
- School entrance in 2006

Location
- 2250 Eddington Drive; Vancouver, British Columbia, V6L 2E7; Canada; 49.2456°N 123.1578°W

Information
- School type: Public, Secondary school
- Motto: "Ich Dien" (I Serve)
- Founded: 1920
- School board: School District 39 Vancouver
- Superintendent: Helen McGregor
- Area trustee: Jennifer Reddy
- Principal: Sangeeta Kauldher
- Grades: 8-12
- Enrollment: 849 (2025/2026)
- Language: English
- Area: Arbutus Ridge
- Colours: Black and Gold
- Team name: Walesmen
- Website: pw.vsb.bc.ca
- Last updated: October 3, 2026

Prince of Wales Secondary School is a public secondary school located in Vancouver, British Columbia, Canada.

== History ==
Prince of Wales is named in honour of Edward, Prince of Wales, the heir apparent to the Canadian throne. The Prince of Wales's feathers, and the Ich dien motto of the school are identical to those of its namesake. Prince of Wales opened for classes in September 1920 at its original site, which is now Shaughnessy Elementary School. In 1960 it moved to its current location, which had previously been a golf course.

== Programs offered ==
=== Mini School Program ===
Prince of Wales Mini School is a district mini school program of 140 students that seeks students from Vancouver who have demonstrated above average academic achievement and involvement in school and community. Each year, students attend outdoor education trips to strengthen the community and learn new skills.

=== TREK Outdoor Education Program ===
The TREK program is offered for grade 10 students from schools throughout the Vancouver School District with an interest in outdoor activities and environmental education.

The program admits 112 students each year, who are get to go on various outdoor trips throughout their school year. The program finishes most of the regular grade 10 academic curriculum while being able to participate in outdoor activities, including both overnight and day trips that teach basic outdoor skills, minimum impact camping, hiking and backpacking, ocean kayaking, canoeing, rock climbing, back-country (telemark) skiing, cross-country (Nordic) skiing, snow shelter building & winter camping, avalanche awareness, cycle touring, outdoor cooking, and map & compass navigation, and in-class focus on sustainability and the environment.

=== GOLD Program ===
The Gifted Over Learning Disabled (GOLD) Program is a district program designed for gifted students who have also been identified as having a learning disability. The acceptance rate is very low with an average of only about 8 students per year. Students in the program have at least one GOLD block as part of their regular timetable with GOLD English also being offered at the grade 8 level. The curriculum of the program includes communication skills, decision making, subject and personal support, self-awareness and self-advocacy.

== Timetable ==
As with other public secondary schools in Vancouver, Prince of Wales operates on a semester system, with four classes from September to late January and four classes from February to late June. Each day consists of four blocks, with classes beginning at 8:40 a.m. and ending at 3:05 p.m. The school formerly operated on a linear timetable of Day 1 / Day 2 rotation, from early September to late June, with each day having had four blocks and 80 minutes of instruction in each block.

== Sports ==
Prince of Wales offers a wide variety of sports throughout the school year, including volleyball, rugby, cross country, badminton basketball, wrestling, rugby, soccer, volleyball, tennis, track and field, and ultimate frisbee.

== Notable alumni ==
- Kim Campbell, 19th Prime Minister of Canada
- Deborah Grey, Reform Party member of Parliament
- Spencer Chandra Herbert, first MLA for Vancouver West End, Vancouver Park Commissioner.
- Emmanuelle Schick Garcia, film director/screenwriter.produce
- Bruce Fairbairn, music producer
- Lawrence Chou, Hong Kong actor, singer
- Jessie Farrell, Canadian country music award-winning singer
- Rafe Mair, broadcaster, political analyst.Fam
- Andrea Neil, pioneer of women's soccer in Canada and first woman to be inducted for soccer into Canada's Sport Hall of Fame
- Nicholas Lea, actor best known for his portrayal of Alex Krycek from The X-Files and as star/producer of Whistler.l
- Sara Neil, Olympic cyclist, winner of the bronze medal in the 57 km road race at the 1987 Pan American games
- Jenny Pat, Hong Kong-born, Chinese-Canadian international art dealer, visual artist, and television personartis
- Tseng Kwong Chi, Hong Kong-born American photographer, artist
- Peter Kelamis, actor and comedian
- Kelly McCormack, actor

== See also ==
- Monarchy in British Columbia
- Royal eponyms in Canada
