= Arbutus Ridge =

Neighborhood of Vancouver, British Columbia, Canada

Coordinates: 49°15′27″N 123°10′28″W

- Neighbourhood
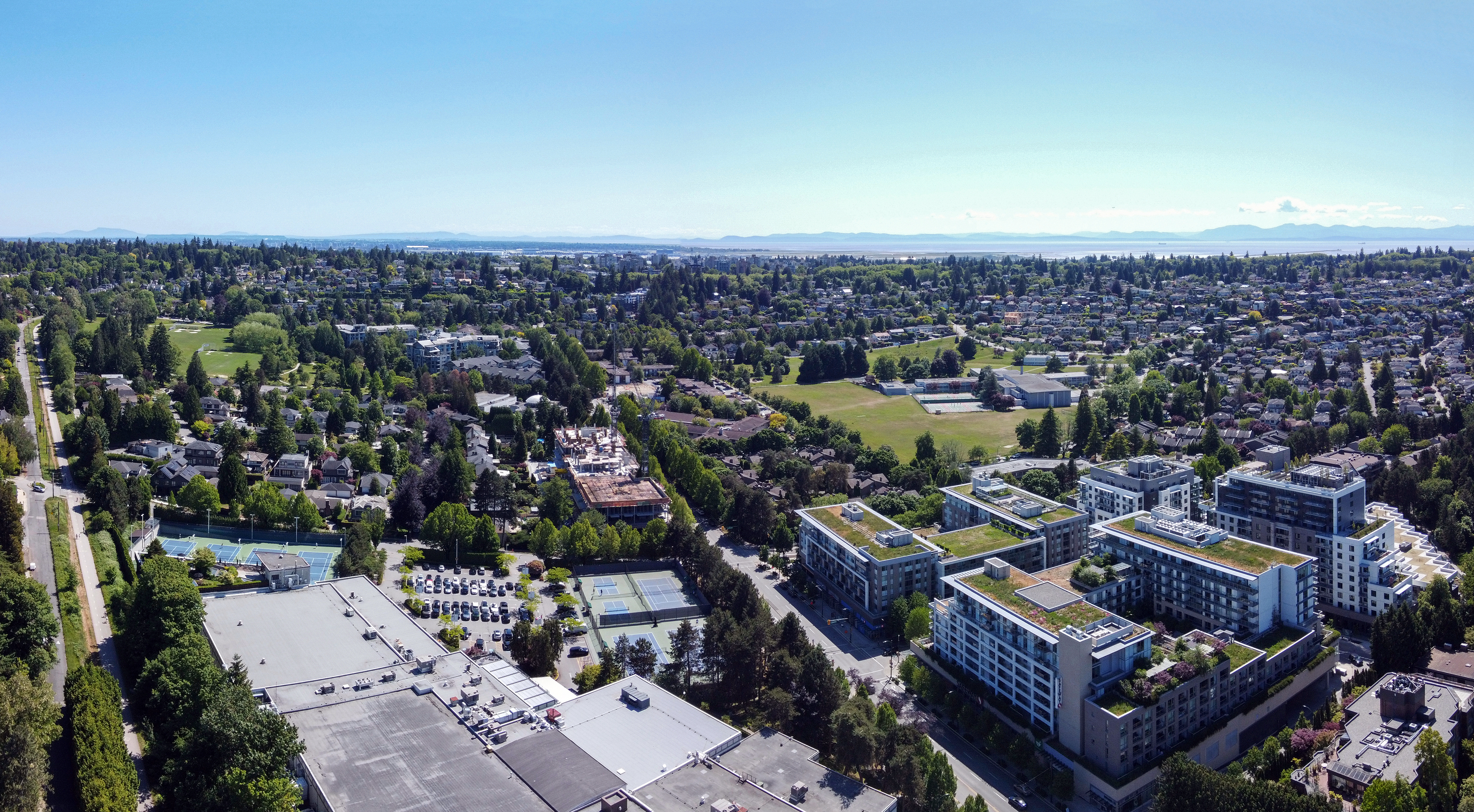
- Arbutus Ridge aerial view in 2026

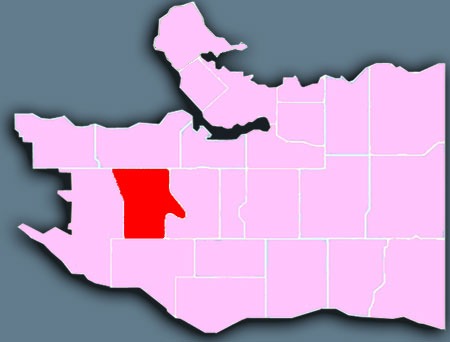
- Location of Arbutus Ridge in Vancouver
- Country: Canada
- Province: British Columbia

Area
  - Total: 3.7 km^{2} (1.4 sq mi)

Population
  - Total: 15,295
  - Density: 4,133.7/km^{2} (10,706/sq mi)

Arbutus Ridge is an affluent residential neighbourhood in Vancouver's West Side. It is bordered by 16th Avenue in the north, 41st Avenue in the south, Mackenzie Street in the west, and East Boulevard in the east. The neighbourhood is characterized by larger than average lot sizes, with stately homes on tree-lined streets.

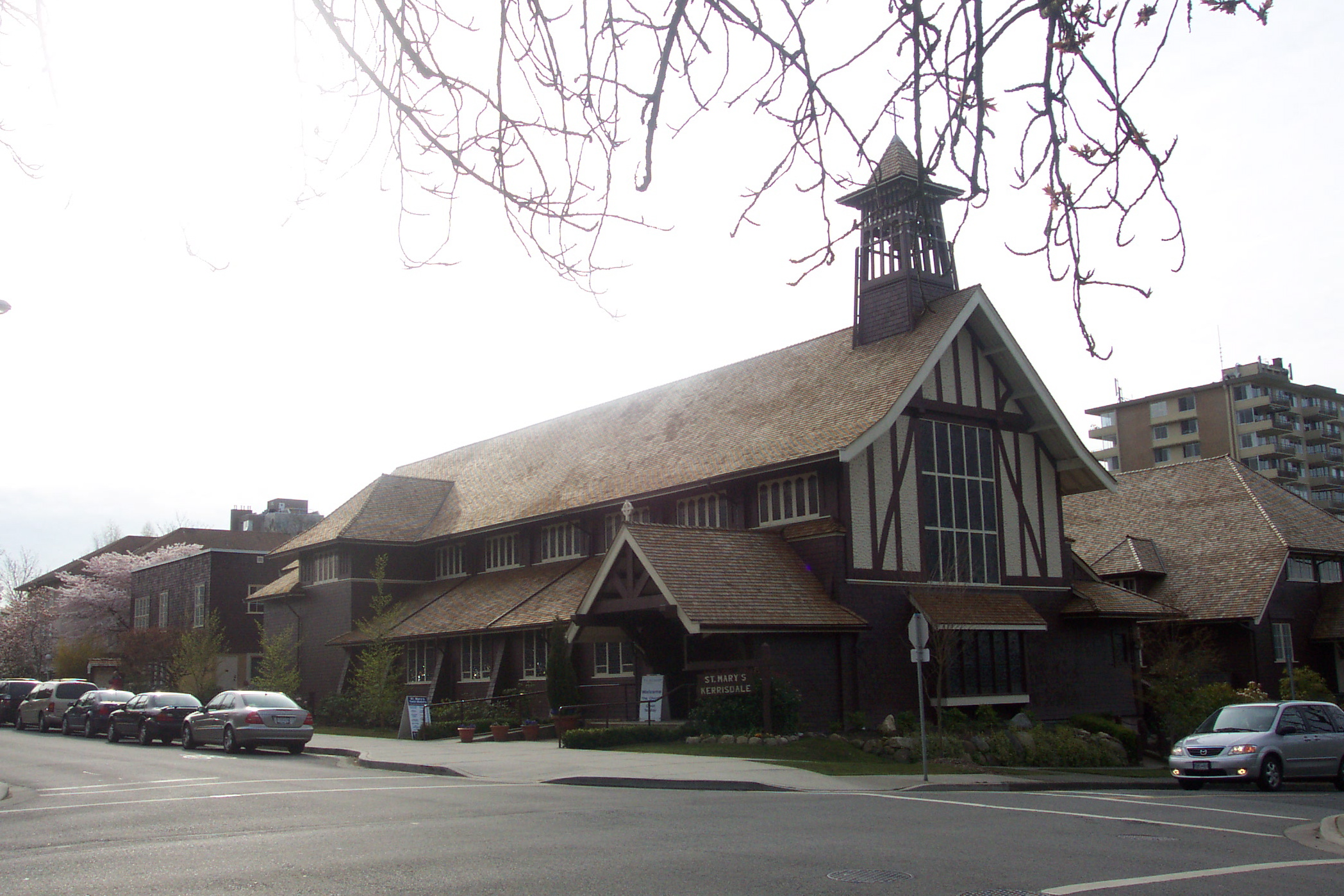
St. Mary's Kerrisdale church

One of the catalysts for growth in the neighbourhood was the existence of the Vancouver-Steveston Interurban route of the British Columbia Electric Railway, which ran between 1905 and 1958. The route once followed by the interurban is now part of the Arbutus Greenway.

== History ==
In 1888, the Province granted 2,100 hectares (5,289 acres) of land to the Canadian Pacific Railway, including a large portion of what is now Arbutus Ridge. The land consisted of uplands that surrounded a low-lying marsh area called Asthma Flats. The upland areas were developed first, between 1912 and the 1930s. In the 1940s and 1950s, the marsh was filled in with sand brought in from False Creek to allow the development of houses and shops.

== Demographics ==
Panethnic groups in the Arbutus Ridge neighbourhood (2001−2016)
Panethnic group	2016		2006		2001	
Panethnic group	Pop.	%	Pop.	%	Pop.	%
East Asian (Note: Statistic includes total responses of "Chinese", "Korean", and "Japanese" under visible minority section on census.)	7,685	50.98%	7,455	47.08%	5,955	42.41%
European (Note: Statistic includes all persons that did not make up part of a visible minority or an indigenous identity.)	6,175	40.96%	7,685	48.53%	7,470	53.21%
South Asian	290	1.92%	210	1.33%	210	1.5%
Middle Eastern (Note: Statistic includes total responses of "West Asian" and "Arab" under visible minority section on census.)	225	1.49%	100	0.63%	50	0.36%
Southeast Asian (Note: Statistic includes total responses of "Filipino" and "Southeast Asian" under visible minority section on census.)	205	1.36%	100	0.63%	120	0.85%
Indigenous	140	0.93%	65	0.41%	45	0.32%
Latin American	75	0.5%	65	0.41%	50	0.36%
African	45	0.3%	40	0.25%	40	0.28%
Other/Multiracial (Note: Statistic includes total responses of "Visible minority, n.i.e." and "Multiple visible minorities" under visible minority section on census.)	250	1.66%	120	0.76%	95	0.68%
Total responses	15,075	98.56%	15,835	98.08%	14,040	96.73%
Total population	15,295	100%	16,145	100%	14,515	100%
Note: Totals greater than 100% due to multiple origin responses

== Education ==
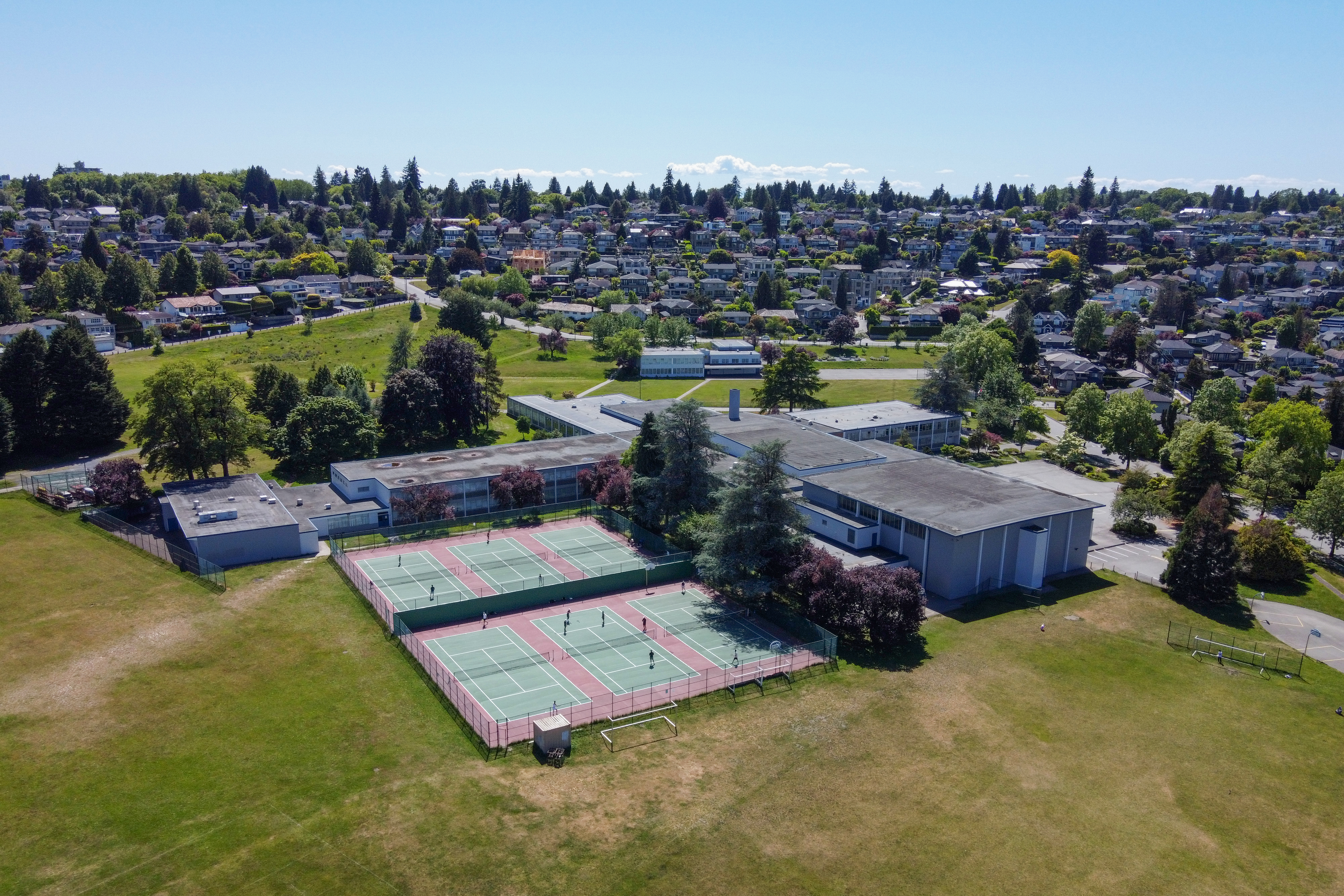
Prince of Wales Secondary School

Prince of Wales Secondary School is located in the neighbourhood, along with Carnarvon Elementary School and Trafalgar Elementary School, which offers a French immersion program.

== Houses ==
Most of the lot sizes are large (50-foot frontage by 120-foot depth), with stately homes on tree-lined streets. In the spring, the area becomes a mecca for cherry blossom enthusiasts, with its many blocks full of blossoms.

== Heritage ==
The Curry Residence at the intersection of Arbutus Street and West 18th Avenue is a one-storey and basement single-family residence. The house is a relatively rare example of Mission Style domestic architecture in Vancouver.
