= Majok Gum =

Canadian basketball player

No. 2 – BC Polytechnica Dupnitsa
- Position: Center
- League: NBL

Personal information
- Born: January 24, 2000 (age 26) Surrey, British Columbia
- Listed height: 6 ft 9 in (2.06 m)
- Listed weight: 184 lb (83 kg)

Career information
- High school: Byrne Creek Community Schooly (Burnaby, British Columbia)
- College: Wilfrid Laurier (2018–2024)
- Playing career: 2024–present

Career history
- 2024-2025: ETV Ibbenbüren
- 2024-2025: EN Baskets Schwelm
- 2025: →Vancouver Bandits
- 2025-2025: BK Amager
- 2026: →Vancouver Bandits
- 2026-present: BC Polytechnica Dupnitsa

Majok Gum (born January 24, 2000), also known as Majok Deng , is a Canadian professional basketball player for BC Polytechnica Dupnitsa of the Bulgarian National Basketball League (NBL). He played college basketball for the Wilfrid Laurier Golden Hawks.

== Early life ==
Gum played high school basketball for Byrne Creek Community School in Burnaby, British Columbia.

== College career ==
Gum played college basketball with the Wilfrid Laurier Golden Hawks from 2018 to 2024.

== Professional career ==
In August 2025, Gum signed with German club ETV Ibbenbüren. He later moved to EN Baskets Schwelm of the ProB league.

On May 6, 2025, Gum signed with the Vancouver Bandits for the 2025 CEBL season.

On December 14, 2025, Gum signed with BK Amager of the Danish Basketligaen.

On May 22, 2026, Gum signed again with the Vancouver Bandits for the 2026 CEBL season.

On September 4, 2026, Gum joined Bulgarian club BC Polytechnica Dupnitsa of the NBL.
