= Grant Shephard =

Canadian basketball player

No. 10 – BC Gargždai
- Position: Power forward
- League: LKL

Personal information
- Born: April 7, 1999 (age 27) Kelowna, British Columbia, Canada
- Listed height: 6 ft 10 in (2.08 m)
- Listed weight: 224 lb (102 kg)

Career information
- High school: Kelowna Secondary (Kelowna, British Columbia); Montverde Academy (Montverde, Florida)
- College: UBC (2017–2020); Carleton (2020–2023)
- Playing career: 2019–present

Career history
- 2019: Fraser Valley Bandits
- 2021: Niagara River Lions
- 2023: Vancouver Bandits
- 2023-2024: Esgueira Aveiro OLI
- 2023-2024: BC Kalev
- 2024-2025: Jämtland Basket
- 2025: Vancouver Bandits
- 2025-2026: CSM Corona Brașov
- 2026: Vancouver Bandits
- 2026-present: BC Gargždai

Career highlights
- KML champion (2024); 2x U SPORTS Champion (2022, 2023); U SPORTS Final 8 All-Star Team (2023); OUA Second Team All-Star (2023); Canada West Third Team All-Star (2020); Canada West Second Team All-Star (2019); U SPORTS All-Rookie Team (2018); Canada West Rookie of the Year (2018)
Medals
Men's basketball
Representing Canada
Commonwealth Games
Silver medal – second place	2018 Gold Coast	Team
FIBA U19 World Cup
Gold medal – first place	2017 Egypt	Team
FIBA U18 AmeriCup
Silver medal – second place	2016 Chile	Team
FIBA U16 AmeriCup
Silver medal – second place	2015 Argentina	Team

Grant Woodrow Shephard (born April 7, 1999) is a Canadian professional basketball player for BC Gargždai of the Lithuanian LKL. He played college basketball for the UBC Thunderbirds and Carleton Ravens.

== High school career ==
Shephard initially attended Kelowna Secondary School where he won a British Columbia provincial championship and was named Most Valuable Player during his junior year in 2016. He later transferred to Montverde Academy in Montverde, Florida during his senior year.

== College career ==
Shephard played college basketball for the UBC Thunderbirds and Carleton Ravens. He won back-to-back U SPORTS national championships with the Ravens in 2022 and 2023.

== Professional career ==
At the 2019 CEBL Entry Draft, Shephard was selected in the 13th round (73rd overall) by the Fraser Valley Bandits as a U SPORTS Development Athlete, allowing him to maintain his university eligibility. In 2021, he was selected by the Niagara River Lions in the 3rd round (16th overall) of the 2021 CEBL–U Sports Draft.

=== 2022-23 season ===
In April 2023, he signed his first full professional contract with the Vancouver Bandits.

=== 2023-24 season ===
Shephard signed with Esgueira Aveiro OLI of the Portuguese LPB for the 2023–2024 season. He later moved to BC Kalev with whom he won a KML championship.

=== 2024-25 season ===
On July 31, 2024, he signed with Jämtland Basket in the Swedish Basketball League.

In April 2025, Shephard re-signed with the Vancouver Bandits for the 2025 CEBL season.

=== 2025-26 season ===
On September 24, 2025, Shephard joined CSM Corona Brașov of the Liga Națională.

In May 2026, Shephard re-signed with the Vancouver Bandits for the 2026 CEBL season, marking his third tenure with the club.

=== 2026-27 season ===
On August 15, 2026, Shephard joined BC Gargždai of the LKL in Lithuania.
