= David Mutabazi =

Rwandan-Canadian basketball player

No. 30 – RSSB Tigers
- Position: Shooting guard
- League: RBL

Personal information
- Born: January 20, 2002 (age 24) Kirinda, Rwanda
- Listed height: 6 ft 1 in (1.85 m)
- Listed weight: 205 lb (93 kg)

Career information
- High school: BC Christian Academy (Port Coquitlam, British Columbia)
- College: Columbia Bible College (2021–2022); Trinity Western Spartans (2022–2025)
- Playing career: 2025–present

Career history
- 2025–2026: Vancouver Bandits
- 2026–present: RSSB Tigers

David Mutabazi (born January 20, 2002) is a Rwandan-Canadian professional basketball player for the RSSB Tigers of the Rwanda Basketball League (RBL). He played college basketball for Columbia Bible College and the Trinity Western Spartans, and represented Rwanda at FIBA AfroBasket 2025.

== Early life ==
Mutabazi was born in Rwanda and moved to Canada at the age of 13. He attended Sullivan Heights Secondary and Gleneagle Secondary before attending BC Christian Academy in his senior year.

== College career ==
Mutabazi played college basketball with the Columbia Bible College Bearcats and Trinity Western Spartans.

== Professional career ==
Mutabazi was selected by the Vancouver Bandits in the third round (30th pick overall) of the 2025 CEBL Draft. He re-signed with the Bandits for the 2026 CEBL season on May 2, 2026.

In August 2026, Mutabazi joined Rwandan club RSSB Tigers, competing in the Rwanda Basketball League and the forthcoming 2026 FIBA Intercontinental Cup.

== National team career ==
In August 2025, Mutabazi was named to the Rwanda national basketball team for the FIBA AfroBasket 2025 tournament.
