= Jameer =

Jameer is a masculine given name. Notable people with the name include:

- Jameer Nelson (born 1982), American general manager
- Jameer Nelson Jr. (born 2001), American basketball player
- Jameer Thurman (born 1995), American football linebacker
