= Edmonds, Burnaby =

Neighourhood in British Columbia, Canada

Edmonds
- Neighbourhood of Burnaby
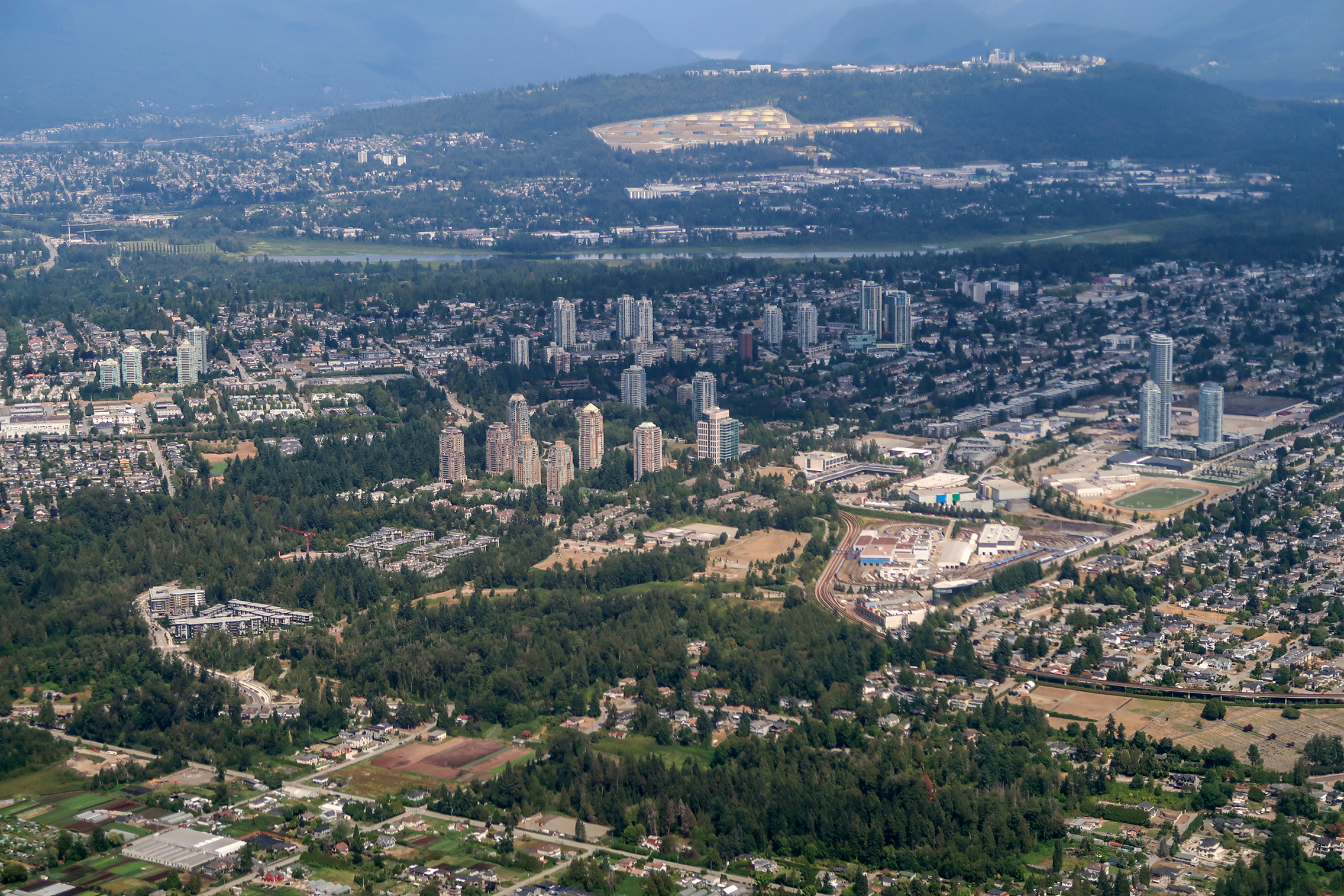
- Aerial view of Edmonds in 2025

- Location of Edmonds within Metro Vancouver
- Coordinates: 49°13′10″N 122°57′00″W
- Country: Canada
- Province: British Columbia
- Region: Lower Mainland
- Regional District: Metro Vancouver
- City: Burnaby

Government
  - Mayor: Mike Hurley
  - MP (Fed.): Wade Chang (LPC)
  - MP (Fed.): Peter Julian (NDP)
  - MLA (Prov.): Raj Chouhan (BC NDP)
- Elevation: 100 m (330 ft)

Population (2021)
  - Total: 39,656
- Time zone: UTC−8 (PST)
  - Summer (DST): UTC−7 (PDT)

Edmonds is a neighbourhood in the southeast of Burnaby, British Columbia, Canada. It is one of the city's four officially designated town centres.

The area is served by the Expo Line of the SkyTrain via Edmonds station.

The neighbourhood is named after businessman and politician Henry Valentine Edmonds, who owned real estate in the area and was active in local affairs.

== Features and amenities ==
Edmonds is home to the Rosemary Brown Recreation Centre, which holds two NHL-sized ice hockey rinks and is named after local politician Rosemary Brown.

Public schools in the area are operated by the Burnaby School District. Twelfth Avenue Elementary School and Edmonds Community Elementary School both fall within Edmonds' borders, as well as the private Catholic elementary school Our Lady of Mercy. The secondary schools serving Edmonds are Byrne Creek Community School and the independent private school St. Thomas More Collegiate.

== Demographics ==
Population history
Year	Pop.	±%
1986	17,493	—
1991	18,858	+7.8%
1996	22,101	+17.2%
2001	24,501	+10.9%
2006	30,976	+26.4%
2011	35,974	+16.1%
2016	37,540	+4.4%
2021	39,656	+5.6%
Source: Statistics Canada

With numerous ethnic backgrounds and over a hundred languages accounted for, Edmonds was found by the Vancouver Sun to be the most diverse neighbourhood in Metro Vancouver.

Panethnic groups in Edmonds (1991−2021)
Panethnic group	2021 Canadian census		2016 Canadian census		2011 Canadian census		2006 Canadian census		2001 Canadian census		1996 Canadian census		1991 Canadian census	
Panethnic group	Pop.	%	Pop.	%	Pop.	%	Pop.	%	Pop.	%	Pop.	%	Pop.	%
East Asian (Note: Statistic includes total responses of "Chinese", "Korean", and "Japanese" under visible minority section on census.)	13,455	34.87%	12,985	35.29%	10,995	31.22%	7,700	25.2%	5,365	22.5%	4,130	19.05%	1,935	10.58%
European (Note: Statistic includes all persons that did not make up part of a visible minority or an indigenous identity.)	8,840	22.91%	9,465	25.73%	10,645	30.22%	12,070	39.5%	10,775	45.19%	12,040	55.54%	12,400	67.78%
Southeast Asian (Note: Statistic includes total responses of "Filipino" and "Southeast Asian" under visible minority section on census.)	5,235	13.57%	4,515	12.27%	4,560	12.95%	2,930	9.59%	1,510	6.33%	880	4.06%	645	3.53%
South Asian	4,375	11.34%	4,380	11.91%	4,440	12.61%	3,875	12.68%	3,305	13.86%	2,045	9.43%	1,795	9.81%
Middle Eastern (Note: Statistic includes total responses of "West Asian" and "Arab" under visible minority section on census.)	2,260	5.86%	1,655	4.5%	1,495	4.24%	995	3.26%	760	3.19%	480	2.21%	435	2.38%
African	1,440	3.73%	1,190	3.23%	1,125	3.19%	970	3.17%	505	2.12%	615	2.84%	125	0.68%
Latin American	900	2.33%	905	2.46%	700	1.99%	620	2.03%	695	2.91%	420	1.94%	290	1.59%
Indigenous	450	1.17%	780	2.12%	545	1.55%	730	2.39%	720	3.02%	690	3.18%	410	2.24%
Other/multiracial (Note: Statistic includes total responses of "Visible minority, n.i.e." and "Multiple visible minorities" under visible minority section on census.)	1,635	4.24%	915	2.49%	715	2.03%	670	2.19%	210	0.88%	380	1.75%	260	1.42%
Total responses	38,590	97.31%	36,790	98%	35,220	97.9%	30,560	98.66%	23,845	97.32%	21,680	98.1%	18,295	97.01%
Total population	39,656	100%	37,540	100%	35,974	100%	30,976	100%	24,501	100%	22,101	100%	18,858	100%
Note: Totals greater than 100% due to multiple origin responses
