= James Karnik =

Canadian-Czech basketball player

No. 99 – Rip City Remix
- Position: Power forward / center
- League: NBA G League

Personal information
- Born: July 17, 1998 (age 28) Surrey, British Columbia, Canada
- Listed height: 6 ft 9 in (2.06 m)
- Listed weight: 250 lb (113 kg)

Career information
- High school: Orangeville Prep (Mono, Ontario)
- College: Lehigh (2017–2020); Boston College (2020–2022)
- NBA draft: 2022: undrafted
- Playing career: 2022–present

Career history
- 2022: Fraser Valley Bandits
- 2022–2023: Lions de Genève
- 2022–2023: Basket Brno
- 2024–2026: Vancouver Bandits
- 2024–2025: Donar Groningen
- 2025–2026: BC Neptūnas
- 2025–2026: SG Apes
- 2025–2026: Bàsquet Girona
- 2026–present: Rip City Remix

James Karel Karnik (born July 17, 1998) is a Canadian-born Czech professional basketball player for the Rip City Remix of the NBA G League. He played college basketball for the Lehigh Mountain Hawks and Boston College Eagles.

== High school career ==
Karnik attended Earl Marriott Secondary School and BC Christian Academy before finishing his high school career at prep schools abroad, first at Balboa Prep in San Diego, California then Orangeville Prep in Mono, Ontario.

== College career ==
Karnik played college basketball for the Lehigh Mountain Hawks and Boston College Eagles. In 130 career games, he totalled 1185 points, 796 rebounds, 82 assists, 68 steals and 64 blocks.

== Professional career ==
=== 2021-22 season ===
On June 24, 2022, Karnik signed with the Fraser Valley Bandits of the Canadian Elite Basketball League for the 2022 CEBL season.

=== 2022-23 season ===
Karnik began the 2022–23 season with the Lions de Genève of the Swiss Basketball League before joining Basket Brno of the National Basketball League (Czech Republic) in March 2023.

=== 2023-24 season ===
In February 2024, Karnik re-signed with the Vancouver Bandits for the 2024 CEBL season.

=== 2024-25 season ===
In September 2024, Karnik signed with Donar Groningen of the BNXT League. On March 31, 2025, Karnik re-joined the Vancouver Bandits for the 2025 CEBL season.

=== 2025-26 season ===
Karnik began the 2025–26 season with BC Neptūnas in the Lietuvos krepšinio lyga. He later moved to the SG Apes of the Mongolian Basketball League on January 13, 2026 then Bàsquet Girona of the Liga ACB on April 22, 2026. In July 2026, Karnik re-signed with the Vancouver Bandits for the 2026 CEBL season.

== National team career ==
Karnik obtained a Czech passport in August 2022, making him eligible to play for Czechia. He represented the Czech Republic men's national basketball team. He has played at the 2023 and 2027 FIBA World Cup qualifiers, and the EuroBasket 2025 qualifiers.

== Personal life ==
Karnik is engaged to Canadian actress Vanessa Morgan, and share a child together.
