= Moscrop Secondary School =

Public secondary school in Burnaby, British Columbia

Moscrop Secondary

Location
- 4433 Moscrop Street; Burnaby, British Columbia, V5G 2G3; Canada; 49.24357°N 123.00448°W

Information
- School type: Public, high school
- Motto: ROAR (Respect, Ownership, Attitude, Responsibility)
- Established: 1956
- School board: School District 41 Burnaby
- School number: 4141011
- Principal: Andy Chin
- Staff: 103
- Grades: 8 to 12
- Enrollment: 1383 (2015)
- Language: English, French
- Colours: Black and Blue
- Mascot: Panther
- Website: www.moscrop.burnabyschools.ca

Moscrop Secondary School is a publicly operated secondary school in Burnaby, British Columbia. The school serves grades eight through twelve and currently has an enrollment of about 1500 students. It is one of the three high schools in School District 41 to offer the French Immersion program.

== History ==
Moscrop opened in 1956 as a junior high school, serving students in Burnaby West. Until 1998, Moscrop Secondary remained a junior high, with only grades seven to nine. In 1964, grade ten was included. In 1998, they incorporated grade 11, and 1999, grade 12. The school's small physical building suffered from strains after expanding its capacity to grades 11 and 12 during and after this time. To accommodate the larger number of students, the building was renovated and an addition was added; notably, the improved science lab and the multi-purpose room. The upgrades took place between 2000 and 2003 and during this time students split their time between the main building and 36 portable classrooms which were located on the upper field.

Moscrop Secondary is a high school which enrolls a population of 1480 students in grade 8 through grade 12 and is expected to grow in the coming years, prompting the need to expand the school. The graduating class consists of approximately 275 students. Feeder schools include Marlborough, Chaffey Burke, Inman, Seaforth and Cascade Heights.

Moscrop Secondary has an Advanced Placement (AP) program offering eleven AP courses ranging from AP European History to AP Macroeconomics, as well as a unique French Immersion program from Grade 8 to 12.

Moscrop Secondary also offers a Career Preparation program whereby students go out on work experience for between 30 or 80 hours at various employers and companies throughout the city. Moscrop Secondary also offers students to go to other schools in the district to be involved with industry training programs (ACE-IT) that enable students to complete the first year theory exams and a portion of the on-the-job training requirements of an apprenticeship program.

=== School searches controversy ===
In early September 2012, a minor scandal erupted at Moscrop Secondary School when multiple senior students were searched without probable cause, with the claim of sanitary checks while possessing a total of three drug sniffing dogs. This was considered a violation of R. v. M. (M.R.) in Canada and is under further investigation.

== Extra-curricular activities ==
The school is home to around 27 student clubs. Amongst them are the Moscrop Esports Club, Leadership Experience Opportunity Club, Amnesty International Club, Model United Nations Club, Philosophy Club, Debate Club, Moscrop Institute of Technology, and Business Council, among many others. The school also has a 9-page seasonal student newspaper, Prowler, produced by a team of student editors, writers, and photographers.

In the past years, Moscrop students have also actively participated in the routine provincial and national science fairs, Canadian Mathematics Contests, Math Challengers, and business competitions.

Some major events at Moscrop Secondary School are organized by students taking the Senior Leadership course and the Student Council. These activities include dances and special activities such as Cornfest, Pancake Day, and Woodstock.

== Notable alumni ==
- Karl Alzner, ice hockey player
- Charles Demers, Comedian, political activist, voice actor, and writer
- Kenndal McArdle, ice hockey player
- Dana Larsen, author, politician and marijuana activist
- Harv Sihra, professional wrestler WWE
- Gurv Sihra, professional wrestler WWE
- Tracy Chu, 2nd runner-up in 2012 Miss Hong Kong Pageant
