= 2024 CEBL Draft =

Canadian Elite Basketball League draft

General information
- Sport: Basketball
- Date: April 11, 2024

Overview
- 30 total selections in 3 rounds
- League: Canadian Elite Basketball League
- Teams: 10
- First selection: Ismaël Diouf (Montreal Alliance)

The 2024 CEBL Draft, the 6th edition of the Canadian Elite Basketball League's annual draft, was announced on April 11, 2024. The 10 teams of the CEBL took turns selecting U Sports and Canadian Collegiate Athletic Association athletes to add to their rosters. The first overall selection was made by the Montreal Alliance, who selected 2024 U Sports Men's Basketball Championship MVP Ismaël Diouf of the Laval Rouge et Or. The 2024 Draft marked the first time teams could select student-athletes from the CCAA, with Jerry Jr. Mercury of Mohawk College becoming the first such selection (30th overall to the Niagara River Lions).

== Format ==
The draft order for the first round is determined by how the teams finished in the 2023 CEBL season, with the last-placed Montreal Alliance obtaining the 1st overall pick. Employing a "snake draft" format, the order is reversed in even-numbered rounds, and returns to the original order in odd-numbered rounds. The draft order for the first round was determined as follows:

1. Montreal Alliance
2. Brampton Honey Badgers
3. Saskatchewan Rattlers
4. Vancouver Bandits
5. Edmonton Stingers
6. Scarborough Shooting Stars
7. Ottawa Blackjacks
8. Winnipeg Sea Bears
9. Calgary Surge
10. Niagara River Lions

== Player selection ==
Source: https://www.cebl.ca/cebl-draft-2024-results

=== Round 1 ===
| Pick | Team | Player | Position | Hometown | School team |
|---|---|---|---|---|---|
| 1 | Montreal Alliance | Ismaël Diouf | F | Saint-Jean-sur-Richelieu, QC | Laval Rouge et Or |
| 2 | Brampton Honey Badgers | Callum Baker | G | Oakville, ON | Toronto Varsity Blues |
| 3 | Saskatchewan Rattlers | Elias Ralph | F | Okotoks, AB | Victoria Vikes |
| 4 | Vancouver Bandits | Adam Olsen | W | Surrey, BC | UBC Thunderbirds |
| 5 | Edmonton Stingers | Aaron Rhooms | W | Toronto, ON | TMU Bold |
| 6 | Scarborough Shooting Stars | Malcolm Christie | G | Fredericton, NB | Dalhousie Tigers |
| 7 | Ottawa BlackJacks | Dragan Stajic | G | Waterloo, ON | Ottawa Gee-Gees |
| 8 | Winnipeg Sea Bears | Simon Hildebrandt | F | Winnipeg, MB | Manitoba Bisons |
| 9 | Calgary Surge | Dondre Reddick | G | Antigonish, NS | St. Francis Xavier X-Men |
| 10 | Niagara River Lions | Jordan Tchuente | W/F | Ottawa, ON | Brock Badgers |

=== Round 2 ===
| Pick | Team | Player | Position | Hometown | School team |
|---|---|---|---|---|---|
| 11 | Niagara River Lions | Luka Syllas | G | Kingston, ON | Queen's Gaels |
| 12 | Calgary Surge | Mike Demagus | G/W | Scarborough, ON | McMaster Marauders |
| 13 | Winnipeg Sea Bears | Tyler Sagl | G | Burlington, ON | Lakehead Thunderwolves |
| 14 | Ottawa BlackJacks | Justin Ndjock-Tadjoré | W | Gatineau, QC | Ottawa Gee-Gees |
| 15 | Scarborough Shooting Stars | Koat Thomas | G/W | Waterloo, ON | St. Francis Xavier X-Men |
| 16 | Edmonton Stingers | Taye Donald | G | St. Thomas, ON | Wilfrid Laurier Golden Hawks |
| 17 | Vancouver Bandits | Jerric Palma | G | Richmond, BC | Western Mustangs |
| 18 | Saskatchewan Rattlers | Alexander Dewar | G | Saskatoon, SK | Saskatchewan Huskies |
| 19 | Brampton Honey Badgers | Cole Syllas | G/W | Kingston, ON | Queen's Gaels |
| 20 | Montreal Alliance | Bahaïde Haïdara | G/W | Longueuil, QC | UQAM Citadins |

=== Round 3 ===
| Pick | Team | Player | Position | Hometown | School team |
|---|---|---|---|---|---|
| 21 | Montreal Alliance | Renoldo Robinson | G | Montreal, QC | Victoria Vikes |
| 22 | Brampton Honey Badgers | David Walker | G/W | Toronto, ON | TMU Bold |
| 23 | Saskatchewan Rattlers | Isaac Simon | G | Regina, SK | Alberta Golden Bears |
| 24 | Vancouver Bandits | Connor Platz | F | Langley, BC | Trinity Western Spartans |
| 25 | Edmonton Stingers | Nate Petrone | G | Calgary, AB | Calgary Dinos |
| 26 | Scarborough Shooting Stars | Davanté Hackett | G | Brampton, ON | Brock Badgers |
| 27 | Ottawa BlackJacks | Michael Kelvin II | W | Ottawa, ON | Queen's Gaels |
| 28 | Winnipeg Sea Bears | Shawn Maranan | G | Winnipeg, MB | Winnipeg Wesmen |
| 29 | Calgary Surge | Noah Wharton | G | Brampton, ON | Calgary Dinos |
| 30 | Niagara River Lions | Jerry Jr. Mercury | G | Scarborough, ON | Mohawk Mountaineers (CCAA) |

== NCAA Transfers ==
Several players selected in the draft later elected to leave their CEBL clubs in order to join NCAA Division I basketball teams. First overall pick Ismaël Diouf transferred to the NC State Wolfpack on June 24th, while fellow first round picks Elias Ralph and Malcolm Christie joined the Pacific Tigers and Oakland Golden Grizzlies, respectively. Following the conclusion of the season, two-time CEBL Developmental Player of the Year Simon Hildebrandt of the Winnipeg Sea Bears, who was offered by the Oregon Ducks in 2023 but elected to remain in U Sports due to eligibility concerns, joined the High Point Panthers, while Ottawa BlackJacks third-round pick Michael Kelvin II transferred to Oklahoma State for his final year of eligibility.
