= South Slope, Burnaby =

Neighourhood in Burnaby, British Columbia

South Slope
- Neighbourhood
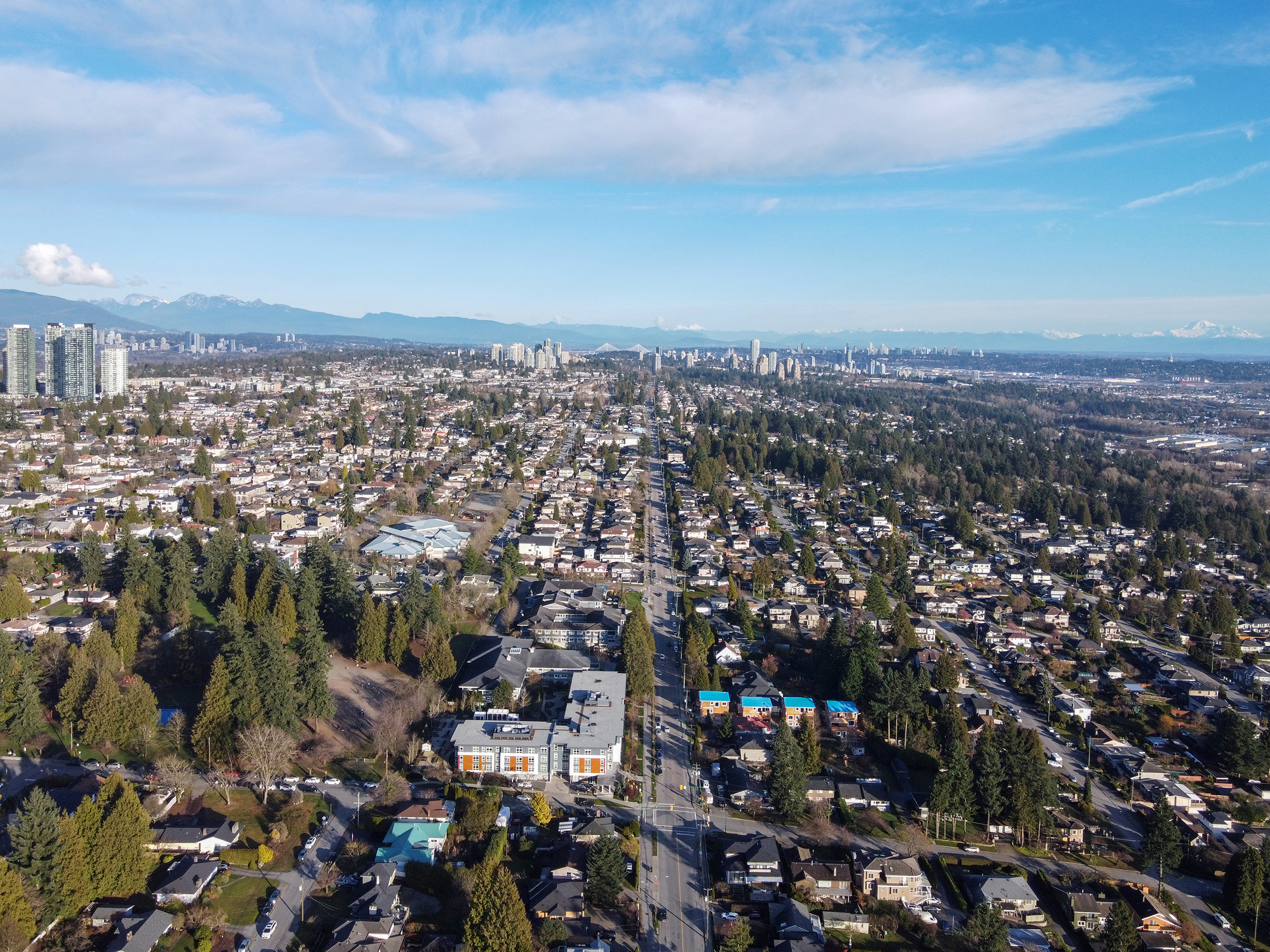
- Aerial view of South Slope from Rumble Street (2026)

- Location in Metro Vancouver
- Coordinates: 49.215°N 123.002°W
- Country: Canada
- Province: British Columbia
- City: Burnaby

South Slope, sometimes referred to as Alta Vista, is a mainly single-family neighbourhood in Burnaby in British Columbia, Canada, just south of Metrotown. It borders Suncrest, an all single-family home neighbourhood to the west, and goes as far east as Byrne Creek Ravine. Although the northern boundary of South Slope is Rumble Street, many residents north of the street consider themselves as living in the neighbourhood, and a couple of institutions including South Slope Elementary, and Burnaby South Secondary School are located north of the neighbourhoods boundary. The neighbourhood gets its name from the steep slope it is located on. The neighbourhood is one of the oldest parts of the city, home to the still operating Nelson Elementary School, which is over a hundred years old, along with dozens of Heritage Homes.

== History ==
South Slope was originally called, "Alta Vista", meaning "High View", and offered early residents in the very early 20th century great views of the, "Fraser Valley", (Richmond, Delta and Big Bend), and was served by Royal Oak, and Highland Park stations, on the historic British Columbia Electric Railway. It is one of the oldest neighborhoods in Burnaby, and that can be seen in the large amounts of historical buildings in the neighborhoods. During 1910 there were about a dozen buildings in the neighbourhood. That number quickly went up to 400 in 1912.

The borough's development blew up in the post-war years, as houses were mass developed, most commonly the, "Mid Century Vernacular", and Vancouver Special later on.

== Commodities ==
Although the neighborhoods is almost all residential, there are small family-owned businesses located on the intersection of Rumble St. and Royal Oak Avenue. There are also townhouses sprouting close to the Skytrain tracks, but are all north of the neighborhood's border (Rumble Street).

== Parks ==
The parks in South Slope mainly consist of creeks that run from the Fraser River watershed. The creeks are maintained by the City of Burnaby who culvert and repair them. Local volunteer stewardship groups are involved in streamkeeping activities, such as water quality monitoring, releasing salmon fry, garbage cleanups, invasive species removal, and other stewardship activities. Many of the creeks have a healthy wildlife population. These creeks include Sussex Creek, Boundary Creek, Kaymar Creek (coho population), Glen-Lyon Creek, Gray Creek (beaver population), Froggers Creek (cutthroat trout population), John Matthews Creek (rainbow trout population), Byrne Creek (chum salmon population), and Jerry Rogers' Creek (muskrat population).

Parks include Alta Vista Reservoir Park, Riverway West School Park, Macpherson Park, David Gray Park, Suncrest Park, Ledingham Park, McKay Park, Ron McLean Park, Taylor Park, 14th Ave Ravine Park, Byrne Creek Ravine Park, and Willard Park.

There was a planned Ice Rink on MacPherson Park, but the located was moved to Eastern Burnaby.

== Main roads ==
Rumble Street, MacPherson Avenue, Marine Drive, Gilley Avenue, Royal Oak Avenue, Nelson Avenue, Sussex Avenue, and Patterson Avenue.

== Schools ==
- Nelson Elementary (oldest school in Burnaby) (K–7)
- Clinton Elementary (K–7)
- Riverway West School (continuing education)
- Glenwood Elementary (K–7)
- South Slope Elementary (K–7)
- Burnaby South Secondary School (8–12)
