= Julian King =

Julian King may refer to:

- Sir Julian King (diplomat) (born 1964), former British ambassador to Ireland
- Julian King (recording engineer), engineer/producer/musician based in Nashville, TN
- Julian King (murder victim), nephew of actress Jennifer Hudson, murdered in 2008
- Julian King (basketball), American basketball player
