= Gabe Osabuohien =

Canadian basketball player (born 1998)

Free agent
- Position: Small forward / power forward

Personal information
- Born: October 27, 1998 (age 28) Toronto, Ontario, Canada
- Listed height: 6 ft 8 in (2.03 m)
- Listed weight: 220 lb (100 kg)

Career information
- High school: Southwest Christian Academy (Little Rock, Arkansas)
- College: Arkansas (2017–2019); West Virginia (2019–2022)
- NBA draft: 2022: undrafted
- Playing career: 2022–present

Career history
- 2022–2024: Cleveland Charge
- 2024: Calgary Surge
- 2024: Cleveland Charge
- 2025: Calgary Surge
- 2025–2026: Manchester Basketball

Career highlights
- NBA G League Sportsmanship Award (2024); Big 12 Defensive Player of the Year (2022); 2× Big 12 All-Defensive Team (2021, 2022)
- Stats at NBA.com
- Stats at Basketball Reference

Gabriel Etinosa Osabuohien (born October 27, 1998) is a Canadian professional basketball player. He played college basketball for the Arkansas Razorbacks and the West Virginia Mountaineers.

== High school career ==
Osabuohien attended the Southwest Christian Academy at Little Rock, Arkansas, where he averaged 11 points, seven rebounds and four assists as a senior while helping his team compile a 31–2 record while advancing to the NACA National Championship.

== College career ==
Osabuohien began his college career at Arkansas, where he played two years and averaged 2.4 points and 2.5 rebounds in 54 games.

After being dismissed by Arkansas for undisclosed reasons, Osabuohien joined West Virginia, where he averaged 4.9 points and 5.3 rebounds per game as a senior and earned the Big 12 Defensive Player of the Year award after ranking 21st in both blocks, with 0.6 and steals with 1.2 per game while being among the best in the nation in advanced stats.

== Professional career ==
=== Cleveland Charge (2022–2024) ===
After going undrafted in the 2022 NBA draft, Osabuohien joined the Cleveland Charge on October 24, 2022, playing 41 games and averaging 2.6 points, 3.9 rebounds and 1.9 assists in 16.1 minutes.

On October 28, 2023, Osabuohien re-joined the Charge where he played in 37 games and averaged 2.5 points, 3.4 rebounds and 2.7 assists in 12.8 minutes. On April 4, 2024, he received the Jason Collier Sportsmanship Award, for his character both on the court and in the community.

=== Calgary Surge (2024) ===
On April 15, 2024, Osabuohien signed with the Calgary Surge of the Canadian Elite Basketball League, playing in 12 games while averaging 6.6 points, 4.5 rebounds and 3.8 assists in 18.4 minutes.

=== Return to the Charge (2024) ===
In July 2024, Osabuohien joined the Cleveland Cavaliers for the 2024 NBA Summer League and on September 24, 2024, he signed with the team. However, he was waived that day and on October 26, he re-joined the Cleveland Charge.

=== Calgary Surge (2025) ===
On April 9, 2025, Osabuohien signed a one-year contract to return to the Calgary Surge for another season. He was one of only two returning players. He switched from number 2 to 22.

== Personal life ==
The son of Kingsley and Roseline Osabuohien, he has two siblings. He graduated with a bachelor's degree in multidisciplinary studies and is pursuing a master's degree in sport management.

On June 3, 2023, Osabuohien was involved in a car accident, suffering two broken ribs, and a broken nose.
