= Jameer Nelson Jr. =

American basketball player (born 2001)

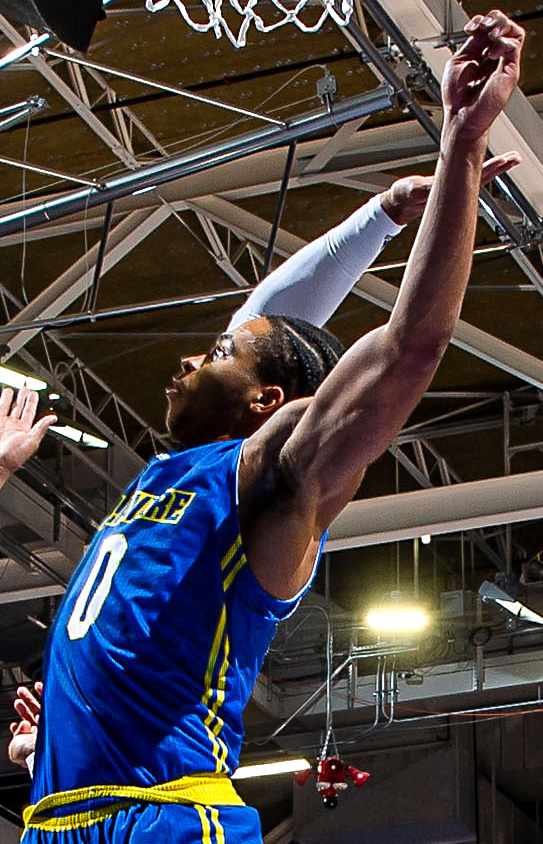
- Nelson in 2022

No. 3 – Delaware Blue Coats
- Position: Point guard
- League: NBA G League

Personal information
- Born: August 7, 2001 (age 25) Haverford, Pennsylvania, U.S.
- Listed height: 6 ft 1 in (1.85 m)
- Listed weight: 190 lb (86 kg)

Career information
- High school: Haverford (Haverford, Pennsylvania)
- College: George Washington (2019–2021); Delaware (2021–2023); TCU (2023–2024)
- NBA draft: 2024: undrafted
- Playing career: 2024–present

Career history
- 2024–2025: Austin Spurs
- 2025: Calgary Surge
- 2025–2026: Stockton Kings
- 2026: Beijing Royal Fighters
- 2026: Piratas de Quebradillas
- 2026: Osos de Manatí
- 2026–present: Delaware Blue Coats

Career highlights
- CEBL Defensive Player of the Year (2025); First-team All-CAA (2023); Second-team All-CAA (2022); CAA All-Defensive Team (2023)
- Stats at NBA.com
- Stats at Basketball Reference

Jameer Lamar Nelson Jr. (born August 7, 2001) is an American professional basketball player for the Delaware Blue Coats of the NBA G League. He played college basketball for the George Washington Revolutionaries, Delaware Fightin' Blue Hens, and TCU Horned Frogs.

== High school career ==
Nelson attended Haverford School at Haverford, Pennsylvania where he led the team to an undefeated 30–0 season that culminated in a Class 5A state championship as a senior, all while averaging 15 points per game and earning second team All-State honors.

== College career ==
Nelson played five seasons of college basketball at George Washington, Delaware and, in his last year, TCU, playing 136 games in total and having career averages of 13.5 points, 4.0 rebounds, 2.8 assists and 2.0 steals while shooting 43.5% from the field and 31.1% from beyond the arc.

In his last season, Nelson played 34 minutes and averaged 11.2 points, 2.6 rebounds, 3.3 assists and 2.1 steals while shooting 43.4% from the field and 30.6% from three.

== Professional career ==
=== Austin Spurs (2024) ===
After going undrafted in the 2024 NBA draft, Nelson joined the San Antonio Spurs for the 2024 NBA Summer League and on September 23, 2024, he signed with the team. However, he was waived three days later. On October 29, he joined the Austin Spurs.

=== Calgary Surge (2025) ===
On April 22, 2025, Nelson signed a one year contract with the Calgary Surge of the Canadian Elite Basketball League. On June 30, Nelson departed the Surge to join the San Antonio Spurs for the 2025 NBA Summer League. In five games with the Spurs, Nelson averaged 6.2 points, 1.4 rebounds, 2.2 assists, and 13.5 minutes. On July 25, Nelson returned to the Surge; two days later, Nelson set a new Canadian Elite Basketball League record for most steals in a single regular season with 45, surpassing Lloyd Pandi who had 44 with the Ottawa BlackJacks in 2024. On August 16, Nelson scored a CEBL playoff record 39 points in a 105–103 win over the Vancouver Bandits in the West Semifinal. the 39 points was also a Surge single game record. On August 21, Nelson was named 2025 Defensive Player of the Year in the CEBL.

=== Stockton Kings (2025–2026) ===
On September 22, 2025, Nelson's player rights were traded to the Stockton Kings in exchange for a first-round pick in the 2026 NBA G League draft. On March 27, 2026, Nelson recorded a career-high 45 points and seven rebounds (including eight three-pointers made) in a 120–112 loss to the San Diego Clippers.

=== Beijing Royal Fighters (2026) ===
On January 2, 2026, Nelson joined Beijing Royal Fighters of the Chinese Basketball Association.

=== Osos de Manatí (2026–present) ===
On May 19, 2026, Nelson joined the Osos de Manatí. On June 6, Nelson had his best game of the season against the Cangrejeros de Santurce, recording 39 points, eight rebounds, and eight assists in a 95–93 victory.

=== Philadelphia 76ers (2026) ===
On September 1, 2026, Nelson signed an Exhibit 10 contract with the Philadelphia 76ers.

== Personal life ==
The son of Jameer and Imani, he has three younger sisters. His father played fourteen seasons in the NBA.
