= British Columbia School for the Deaf =

Provincial school in British Columbia, Canada

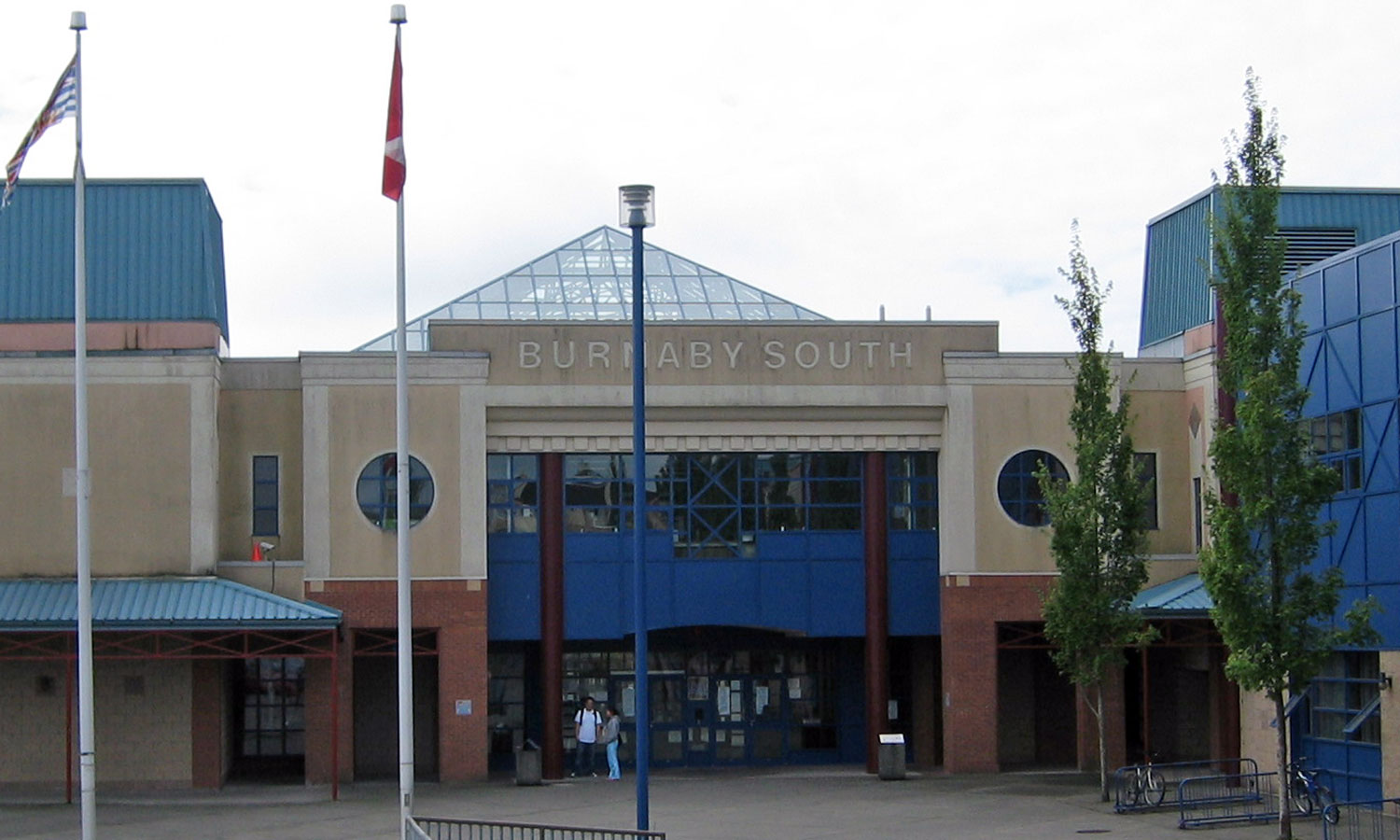

Location
- 5455 Rumble Street; Burnaby, British Columbia, V5J 2B7; Canada; 49°12′58″N 122°59′7″W

Information
- School type: Provincial School for the Deaf
- Founded: 1915
- School district: School District 41 Burnaby
- Principal: Catherine Bennett
- Grades: 8-12
- Language: American Sign Language (ASL), English
- Website: bcsd.burnabyschools.ca

The British Columbia School for the Deaf is a provincial school in Burnaby, British Columbia with day programs serving deaf and hard-of-hearing students. The school teaches secondary students. It serves around 50 students and shares a campus with Burnaby South Secondary School for hearing students.

== Elementary school ==
British Columbia School for the Deaf, Elementary

Location
- 4446 Watling Street; Burnaby, British Columbia, V5J 5H3; Canada

Information
- School type: Provincial School for the Deaf
- Founded: 1915
- School district: School District 41 Burnaby
- Principal: Catherine Bennett
- Grades: K-7
- Language: American Sign Language (ASL), English
- Website: bcsd.burnabyschools.ca

The British Columbia School for the Deaf is also an active elementary school in Burnaby, British Columbia, serving students from kindergarten to Grade 7.

The elementary school shares a campus with South Slope Elementary School, for hearing students, hosting around 100 students.

Deaf students from Canada often attend Gallaudet University or VCC for post-secondary programs.
