= Byrne Creek Community School =

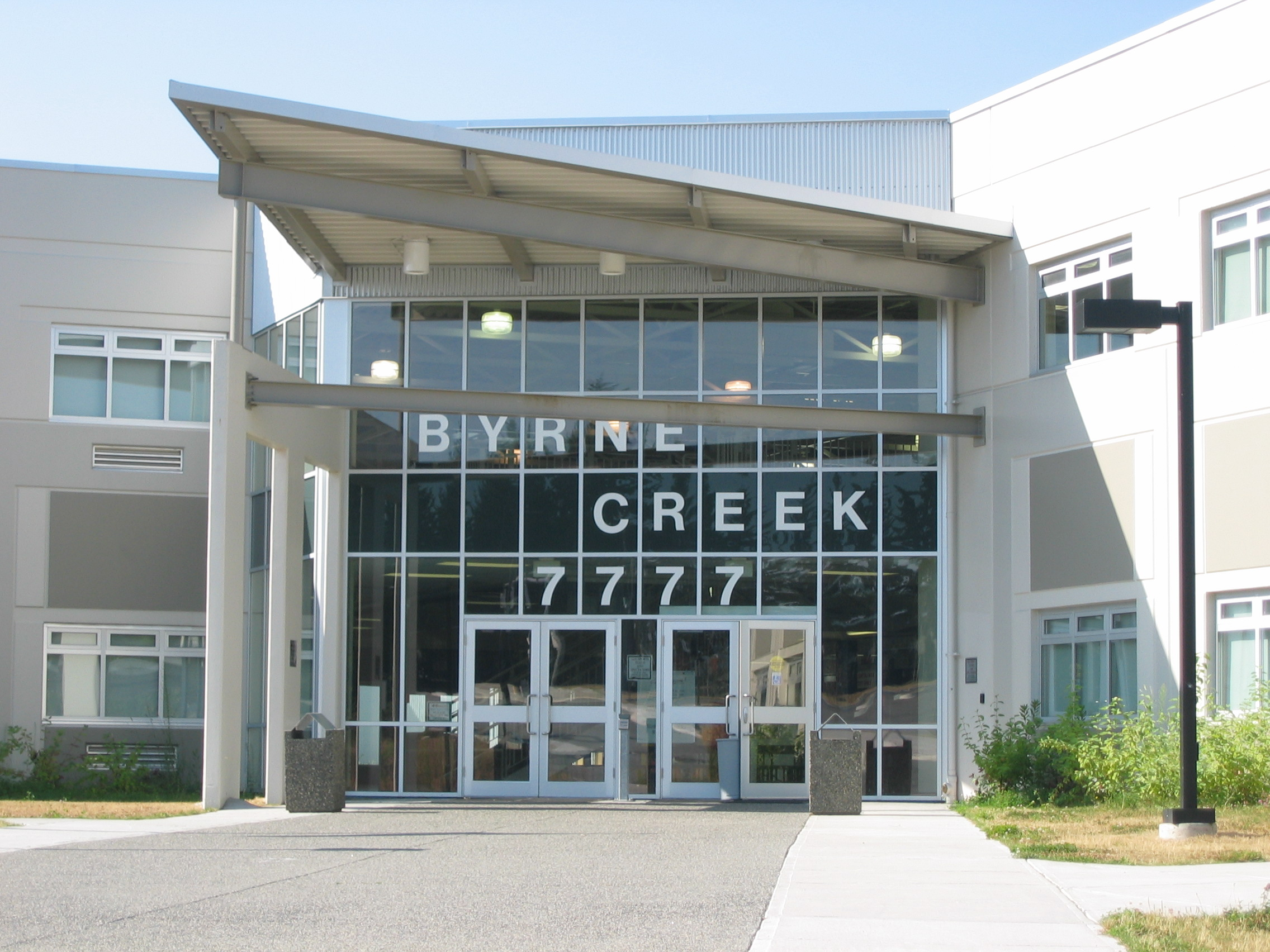

Location
- 7777 18th St; Burnaby, British Columbia, V3N 5E5; Canada; 49.208304°N 122.948296°W

Information
- School type: Public, high school
- Motto: HEART (Honesty, Empathy, Achievement, Respect, Teamwork)
- Founded: September 2005; 21 years ago
- School board: School District 41 Burnaby
- Area trustee: Ms. Baljinder Narang
- School number: 4141068
- Administrator: Semester System (September–January; February–June)
- Principal: Ben Paré
- Staff: 108 (include secretaries and other employed members)
- Grades: 8-12
- Enrollment: 1,034 (2026)
- Language: English
- Area: Edmonds
- Colours: Blue and Silver
- Mascot: Bulldog
- Team name: Bulldogs
- Website: byrnecreek.burnabyschools.ca

Byrne Creek Community School is a public high school in Burnaby, British Columbia and part of School District 41 in Burnaby. It is in the Edmonds area and serves over 1,034 students as of 2026. Byrne Creek Community School is the only secondary community school in the District of Burnaby.

== Origin of the name ==
The name Byrne Creek, for which the school is named, can be traced back to Peter Byrne—who served as reeve (mayor) from 1906 to 1910. The creek is a short distance west from the school. The creek has its origins just north-east of Edmonds station. The creek runs south through Byrne Creek Ravine Park (which has several trails for walking) in the Edmonds neighbourhood before joining the Fraser River in the Big Bend neighbourhood at Burnaby Fraser Foreshore Park.

== History ==
Byrne Creek officially opened in September 2005, being the most recently established secondary school in the Burnaby School District. It was built to accommodate up to 1200 students, for the rising population in the city of Burnaby. Most students who attended schools close to Byrne Creek's vicinity transferred out of their schools to attend the closer institution. As of the 2025/2026 school year, there are 1034 students attending the school.

.

== Events ==
One event that has become a tradition, despite the school's young age, is the Bulldog Bash, where all students celebrate the end of a successful school year. Another event that is held for three days after school is the VPA (Visual Performance Arts) show. This performance allows the dance and art classes to showcase their hard work in a span of three days.

Byrne Creek’s Music Council hosts two concerts annually: the Winter Concert on the evening of the first Thursday of December, and the Spring Concert on the evening of the first Thursday of June. During these concerts, the school’s beginner, junior, intermediate, and senior concert bands, as well as the jazz band, perform prepared pieces for students, teachers, friends, families, and other guests in attendance.

The annual Holiday Hamper Drive is organized by the school’s Student Government to raise funds for food hampers for families who require additional support during the Christmas winter break. The initiative includes fundraisers and in-school events designed to encourage student participation and collect donations. To support the Hamper Drive, the school hosts an annual Benefit Concert featuring a range of performances, music, and food. Students can contribute by purchasing items through the various fundraisers organized by the Student Government or by making direct donations.

The school’s Leo Club organizes and supports a variety of volunteer initiatives and school events. These include the annual Haunted House, in which Grade 6 and 7 students from nearby elementary schools visit a haunted house organized by club members; Student Learning Conferences (Parent-Teacher meetings), where members assist with directing parents to scheduled meetings with teachers; and the Diversity Dance, a district-wide event promoting diversity within the community.

The Leo Club also organizes activities such as the Valentine’s Day Rose Sale, where students can purchase roses for friends; the school’s Winter Formal for senior students; and clothing drives supporting members of the local community. In addition, Leo Club members assist with events such as the school’s Open House for prospective families and visits from Grade 6 and 7 classes from nearby elementary schools, during which students tour the school and learn about its programs.

== Awards ==
In 2012, Byrne Creek was awarded the Whole Child Award by the international Association for Supervision and Curriculum Development.
