= R v AM =

- Supreme Court of Canada

Hearing: May 22, 2007 Judgment: April 25, 2008
- Full case name: Her Majesty The Queen v AM
- Citations: [2008] 1 S.C.R. 569, 2008 SCC 19
- Ruling: Appeal dismissed.

Court membership
- Chief Justice: Beverley McLachlin; Puisne Justices: Michel Bastarache, Ian Binnie, Louis LeBel, Marie Deschamps, Morris Fish, Rosalie Abella, Louise Charron, Marshall Rothstein

Reasons given
- Majority: LeBel J (paras 1–2), joined by Fish, Abella and Charron JJ
- Concurrence: Binnie J and McLachin CJ (paras 3–99)
- Dissent: Deschamps, Rothstein JJ (paras 100–149)
- Dissent: Bastarache J (paras 212–256)

Laws applied
- R v Kang-Brown, [2008] 1 SCR 456

R v AM [2008] 1 S.C.R. 569, 2008 SCC 19, is a constitutional decision by the Supreme Court of Canada on the limits of police powers for search and seizure. The Court found that police do not have the right to perform a sniffer-dog search (to use dogs to conduct random searches) of public spaces when such search is not specifically authorized by statute. In this case, a student's section 8 rights under the Canadian Charter of Rights and Freedoms ("Charter") were violated when a police officer sniffer-dog searched his unattended backpack in the gymnasium of his school finding drugs in his possession.

== Background ==
On November 7, 2002, at St. Patrick's Catholic High School in Sarnia, Ontario, the police accepted a long-standing invitation by the principal of a high school to bring sniffer dogs into the school to search for drugs. The police had no knowledge drugs were present in the school and would not have been able to obtain a warrant to search the school. While all the students were confined to their classrooms, the principal told the students to leave their backpacks in their lockers. The students who had come in late had to put their backpacks in the gym. After passing the lockers, the officer then had a drug-sniffing dog sniff the unattended backpacks lined up against a wall in the gymnasium. The dog reacted and bit one of the backpacks.

Without obtaining a warrant, the police opened the backpack and found illicit drugs. They charged the student who owned the backpack with possession of marijuana and psilocybin for the purpose of trafficking.

== Lower court rulings ==
=== Trial Court ===
At trial, the accused brought an application for exclusion of the evidence, arguing that his rights under section 8 of the Charter had been violated. The trial judge allowed the application, finding two unreasonable searches: the search conducted with the sniffer dog and the search of the backpack. He excluded the evidence and acquitted the accused.

=== Court of Appeal ===
On appeal, the Court of Appeal for Ontario agreed with the trial judge and upheld the acquittal. No school authority requested the presence of police on that day, and no school official played any active role in the search. The "standing invitation" to the police to conduct a sniffer-dog search of the school did not render this search a "search by school authorities".

== Supreme Court Ruling ==
The Court found that students are entitled to privacy in a school environment. Since there was no authority in the statutes or at common law for the sniffer dog search in this case, the search violated section 8 of the Charter. Consequently, the evidence should be excluded as it would interfere with the fairness of justice under section 24(2) of the Charter. Therefore, the appeal was dismissed.

The following issues were put to the Court:

1. whether dog sniff constituted search of content of student backpack
2. if so, whether the search was reasonable.
3. if the search was unreasonable and the appellant's rights were violated, whether the evidence ought to be excluded under s. 24(2) of the Canadian Charter of Rights and Freedoms;
4. whether common law powers of police to investigate crime include use of sniffer dogs.

=== Opinion of the Court ===
The majority agreed that the dog sniff amounted to a search within section 8 of the Charter because by use of the dog, the police officer could "see" through the concealing fabric of the backpack, and students are entitled to privacy in a school environment. Since there was no authority in the statutes or at common law for the warrantless sniffer dog search in this case, the search violated section 8 of the Charter.

=== Expectation of privacy standard ===
Teenagers expect the contents of their backpacks not to be open to the random and speculative scrutiny of the police. This expectation is a reasonable one that society should support. The guilty secret of the contents of the accused's backpack was specific and meaningful information, intended to be private, and concealed in an enclosed space in which the accused had a continuing expectation of privacy.

Although a warrantless sniffer dog search is available where reasonable suspicion is demonstrated, the sniffer dog search of the students' belongings in this case violated their Charter rights under section 8. The dog sniff search was unreasonably undertaken because there was no proper justification. The youth court judge found that the police lacked any grounds for reasonable suspicion and excluded the evidence. The Court agreed that his exclusion of the evidence should not be interfered with.

=== Reasonable suspicion standard ===
In the context of a routine criminal investigation, the police are entitled to use sniffer dogs based on a "reasonable suspicion". If there are no grounds of reasonable suspicion, the use of the sniffer dogs will violate the section 8 reasonableness standard. In this case, the search was executed unreasonably, and thereby constituted a Charter breach, on the basis of which the evidence obtained may be excluded. The importance of proper tests and records of particular dogs will be an important element in establishing the reasonableness of a particular sniffer dog search.

=== Sniffer dog context ===
In sniffer dog situations, the police are generally required to take quick action guided by on the spot observations. In circumstances where this generally occurs, it is not feasible to subject the "sniffer dog's" sniff to prior judicial authorization. Both the subject and his suspicious belongings would be long gone before the paperwork could be done. In the particular context of sniffer dogs, there is sufficient protection for the public in the prior requirement of reasonable suspicion and after the fact judicial review to satisfy the "reasonableness" requirement of section 8.

The trade-off for permitting the police to deploy their dogs on a "reasonable suspicion" standard without a warrant is that if this procedure is abused and sniffer dog searches proceed without reasonable suspicion based on objective facts, the consequence could well tip the balance against the admission of the evidence if it is established under section 24(2) of the Charter that, having regard to all the circumstances, the admission of it in the proceedings would bring the administration of justice into disrepute. Also in the section 8, it was violated because they searched A.M without his right

=== Dissent ===
Bastarache, Deschamps and Rothstein JJ dissented. Deschamps and Rothstein JJ found there was no need to determine whether section 8 of the Charter was violated because the dog sniff of the backpack at the school did not amount to a search. Hence, there was no need to determine whether the evidence should be excluded pursuant to section 24(2) of the Charter.

Bastarache J found that the police possess a common law power to search using drug sniffer dogs on the basis of a Charter compliant standard of generalized suspicion and that the trial judge erred in excluding the evidence pursuant to section 24(2) of the Charter.

Rothstein J in held that the combination of the school's advertised "zero-tolerance" drug policy, the drugs in schools and the unattended state of the suspect's backpack reduced his privacy expectation to zero.

== See also ==
- List of Supreme Court of Canada cases (McLachlin Court)
- R v M (MR), [2008] 3 SCR 393
- R v Kang-Brown, [2008] 1 SCR 456, a similar case that was heard on the same day as R v AM
