= Tyrese Samuel =

Canadian basketball player (born 2000)

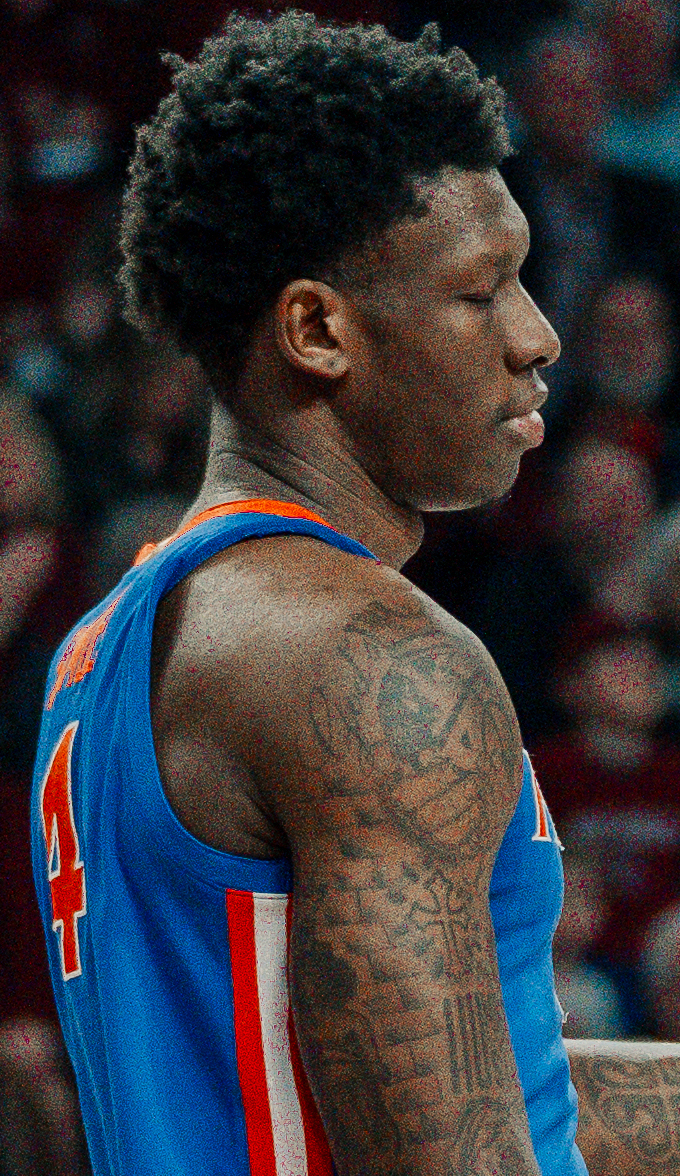
- Samuel in 2024

No. 5 – JL Bourg
- Position: Power forward
- League: LNB Élite; EuroCup

Personal information
- Born: March 10, 2000 (age 26) LaSalle, Quebec, Canada
- Listed height: 6 ft 9 in (2.06 m)
- Listed weight: 239 lb (108 kg)

Career information
- High school: Riverdale Baptist (Upper Marlboro, Maryland); Orangeville Prep (Orangeville, Ontario)
- College: Seton Hall (2019–2023); Florida (2023–2024)
- NBA draft: 2024: undrafted
- Playing career: 2024–present

Career history
- 2024–2025: Valley Suns
- 2025: Vancouver Bandits
- 2025–2026: Valley Suns
- 2026: Raptors 905
- 2026–present: JL Bourg

Career highlights
- Second-team All-SEC (2024)
- Stats at NBA.com
- Stats at Basketball Reference

Tyrese Samuel (born March 10, 2000) is a Canadian professional basketball player for JL Bourg of the LNB Pro A and the EuroCup. He played college basketball for the Seton Hall Pirates and the Florida Gators.

== High school career ==
Samuel initially attended Riverdale Baptist at Upper Marlboro, Maryland where he won a Maryland state championship. Afterwards, he transferred to Orangeville Prep at Orangeville, Ontario where he averaged 15 points, eight rebounds, three assists, three steals and one block as a senior seasonhelping the team finish with a 19–2, the third best in the country.

In 2019, Samuel attended the Basketball Without Borders camp, where he was named an All-Star.

== College career ==
Samuel played college basketball for the Seton Hall Pirates and the Florida Gators. In 154 career games, he totalled 1,315 points, 779 rebounds, 123 assists, 108 steals and 107 blocks.

In his last year, at Florida, Samuel played 36 games and averaged 13.9 points, 7.4 rebounds, 1.9 assists, 1.1 steals and 1.1 blocks while shooting 56.4% from the field while having three 20-point games and 11 double-doubles, which tied for the ninth-most in a single season in the program's history.

== Professional career ==
=== Valley Suns (2024–present) ===
After going undrafted in the 2024 NBA draft, Samuel joined the Phoenix Suns for the 2024 NBA Summer League and on September 26, 2024, he signed with the team. However, he was waived that day. On October 27, he joined the Valley Suns.

=== Vancouver Bandits (2025–2026) ===
On April 7, 2025, Samuel signed with the Vancouver Bandits of the Canadian Elite Basketball League.

=== JL Bourg (2026–present) ===
On June 5, 2026, he signed with JL Bourg of the LNB Pro A.

== Personal life ==
The son of Patricia Bynoe and John Samuel, he has two sisters.
