= 2014 NAIA Division I men's basketball tournament =

College basketball tournament

- Teams: 32
- Finals site: Municipal Auditorium; Kansas City, Missouri
- Champions: Vanguard (1 title, 1 title game)
- Runner-up: Emmanuel (1 title game)
- Semifinalists: St. Gregory's; MidAmerica Nazarene

The 2014 Buffalo Funds - NAIA Men’s Division I Basketball Tournament was held in March at Municipal Auditorium in Kansas City, Missouri. The 77th annual NAIA basketball tournament featured 32 teams playing in a single-elimination format.

== 2014 NAIA tournament awards ==
- Most consecutive tournament appearances: 23rd, Georgetown (KY)
- Most tournament appearances: 33rd, Georgetown (KY)

== Bracket ==
First round	Second round
1	Cal State San Marcos	88
-	Oklahoma Baptist	81
1	Cal State San Marcos	92
16	Culver–Stockton College	91
16	Culver–Stockton College	101
-	Arizona Christian University	83
Naismith Bracket
9	Rocky Mountain College	58
-	University of the Cumberlands	82
-	Cumberlands	51
8	Emmanuel	73
-	University of St. Thomas (Texas)	62
8	Emmanuel College (Georgia)	74
5	Southwestern Assemblies of God University	97
-	St. Catharine College	99
-	St. Catharine	79
-	Hope International	75
-	Hope International	61
12	Xavier (Louisiana)	52
Cramer Bracket
13	LSU Shreveport	71
-	MidAmerica Nazarene	96
-	MidAmerica Nazarene	80
4	Columbia	75
-	Belhaven University	57
4	Columbia College (Missouri)	81
3	William Carey	109
-	Philander Smith College	92
3	William Carey	90
14	Georgetown	98
-	Wayland Baptist University	90
14	Georgetown College	97
Duer Bracket
11	Benedictine College	70
-	Westminster College (Utah)	65
11	Benedictine	70
6	Vanguard	81
-	Life University	94
6	Vanguard	103
7	Talladega	88
-	Evangel University	71
7	Talladega	64
10	Freed-Hardeman	71
-	Montana State-Northern	63
10	Freed–Hardeman University	71
Liston Bracket
15	Wiley College	69
-	St. Gregory's University	84
-	St. Gregory's	88
2	Pikeville	83
-	Lindenwood University – Belleville	76
2	Pikeville	103

Quarterfinals
1	Cal State San Marcos	89
8	Emmanuel	94*
-	St. Catharine	73
-	MidAmerica Nazarene	86
14	Georgetown	85
6	Vanguard	93
10	Freed-Hardeman	82
-	St. Gregory's	84

Semifinals
8	Emmanuel	76
-	MidAmerica Nazarene	72
6	Vanguard	108
-	St. Gregory's	88

Championship
8	Emmanuel	65
6	Vanguard	70

- *denotes overtime
