= Burnaby Central Secondary School =

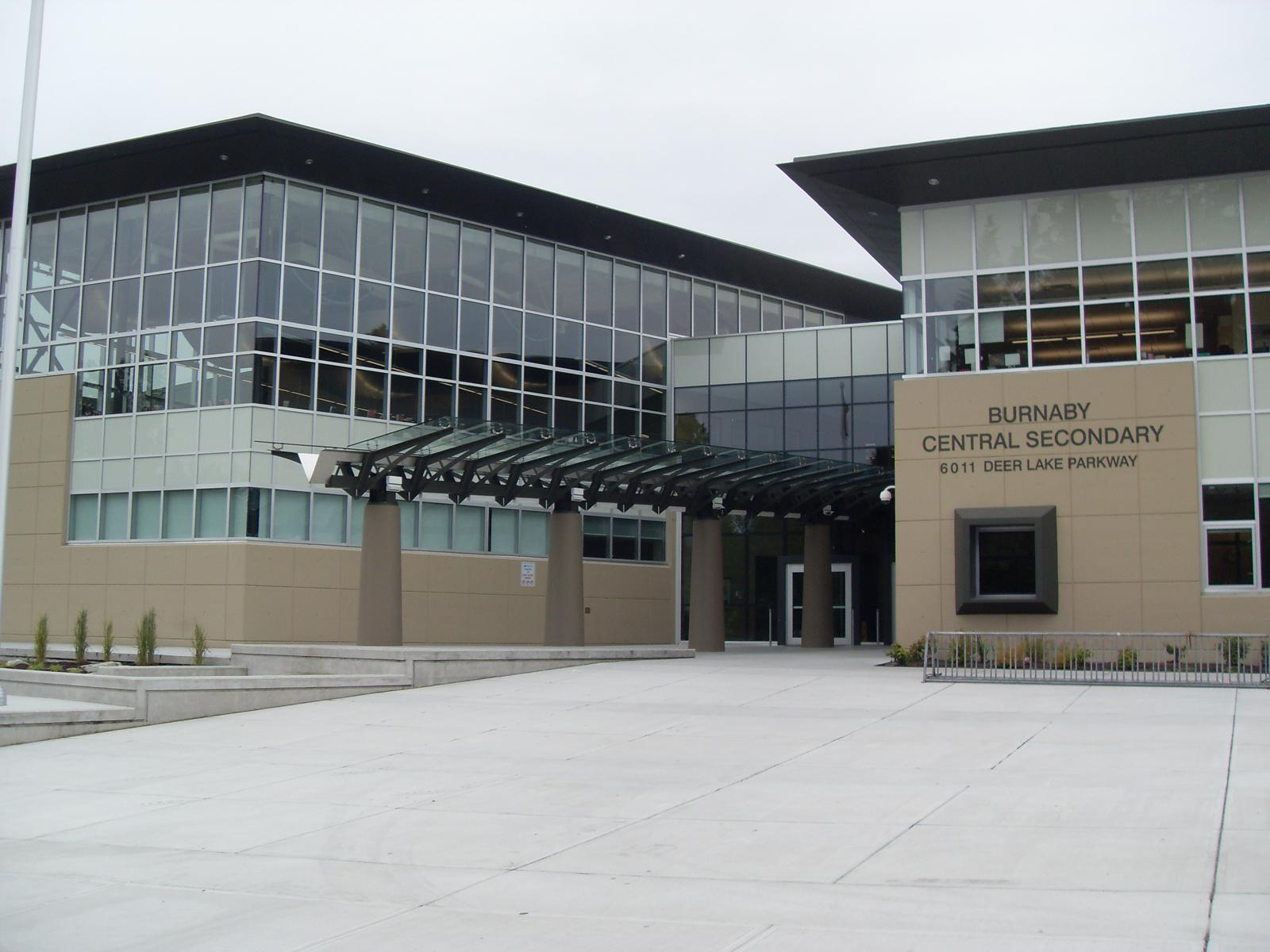
- The main entrance of Burnaby Central Secondary in Burnaby, BC

Location
- 6011 Deer Lake Parkway; Burnaby, British Columbia, V5G 0A9; Canada; 49°14′38.3″N 122°58′30.5″W

Information
- School type: Public, high school
- Motto: Quorum Pars Sum (Of which I am a part)
- Founded: 1958
- School board: School District 41 Burnaby
- School number: 4141001
- Principal: Tim Wozney
- Staff: 85
- Grades: 8–12
- Enrollment: 1,437 (2015)
- Language: English
- Colours: Black, white, red and gold
- Mascot: Wildcat
- Team name: Wildcats
- Website: central.burnabyschools.ca

Burnaby Central Secondary School is a public high school in Burnaby, British Columbia. It is a short distance from Burnaby City Hall and Deer Lake Park. Burnaby Central is a part of Burnaby School District 41. As of 2026, there are more than 1,400 students attending the school. Classes at Burnaby Central usually follow the semester system.

This new school building was constructed where the previous school's outdoor field was located. Construction began on a seismically sound school building in 2009 due to the Seismic Mitigation Program (SMP), a seismic upgrading program. Burnaby Central Secondary School's new campus opened in September 2011.

== Facilities ==
Burnaby Central Secondary has three floors and three wings. The student commons, a double height high ceiling atrium, sits in the middle of the central wing (A) and separates wings B and C. It contains 52 classrooms. Other facilities include:

- Art studios
- Cafeteria
- Braille printing room
- Digital recording studio
- Competition running track
- Electronics lab
- Drafting lab
- Photography dark rooms
- Computer labs (3)
- Food studies kitchen (2)
- Gymnasiums (2)
- Textiles classroom
- Music rooms
- Wrestling room
- Weight room
- Theatre
- Dance studio
- Home economic labs
- Library
- Science labs
- Auto mechanics shop
- Woodwork shop
- Conference centre
- Learning centre

== Notable alumni ==
- Sam Adekugbe, soccer player
- Bryce Alderson, soccer player
- Glenn Anderson, ice hockey player
- Marco Carducci, soccer player
- Caleb Clarke
- Roger Cross, actor
- Alphonso Davies, soccer player
- Charles Demers, Comedian, political activist, voice actor, and writer
- Rob Feenie, Iron Chef winner and restaurateur
- Ben Fisk, soccer player
- Michael J. Fox, actor, activist, dropped out of school
- Kaleigh Fratkin (born 1992), professional ice hockey player
- Julia Grosso, soccer player
- Kaela Hansen, soccer player
- Farhan Lalji, TSN TV reporter
- Patrick Lussier, film director
- Kenndal McArdle, ice hockey player
- Colin Percival, computer scientist
- Dave Steen, decathlete, Order of Canada recipient (first Canadian to score 8,000 points)
- Adam Straith, soccer player
- Russell Teibert, soccer player
- Dale Walters, retired Olympic boxer
