= R v Kang-Brown =

- Supreme Court of Canada

Hearing: May 22, 2007 Judgment: April 25, 2008
- Full case name: Her Majesty The Queen v Gurmakh Kang-Brown
- Citations: [2008] 1 S.C.R. 456, 2008 SCC 18
- Ruling: Appeal allowed by six judges, conviction voted to be set aside.

Court membership
- Chief Justice: Beverley McLachlin; Puisne Justices: Michel Bastarache, Ian Binnie, Louis LeBel, Marie Deschamps, Morris Fish, Rosalie Abella, Louise Charron, Marshall Rothstein

Reasons given
- Majority: LeBel J (paras 1–17), joined by Fish, Abella and Charron JJ
- Concurrence: Binnie J and McLachin CJ (paras 18–105)
- Dissent: Deschamps and Rothstein JJ (paras 106–211)
- Dissent: Bastarache J (paras 212–256)

Laws applied
- R v AM, 2008 SCC 19

R v Kang-Brown [2008] 1 S.C.R. 456, 2008 SCC 18, is a constitutional decision by the Supreme Court of Canada on the limits of police powers for search and seizure. The Court found that police do not have the right to perform a sniffer-dog search (to use dogs to conduct random searches) of public spaces when such a search is not specifically authorized by statute. In this case, a suspect's section 8 rights under the Canadian Charter of Rights and Freedoms ("Charter") were violated when a police officer stopped him at a bus station and a sniffer-dog searched his bag finding drugs in his possession.

== Background ==
On January 25, 2002, at about 11:00 a.m. at the Calgary, Alberta, bus terminal, three police officers were involved in a special operation designed to detect drug couriers. While observing a bus arriving at the station, they spotted the accused, Gurmakh Kang-Brown, disembarking from the all-night Greyhound bus from Vancouver. The accused gave the officers an elongated stare. The officers found the accused's behaviour suspicious, stopped him and asked him if he was carrying narcotics. The accused said no. Then, one of the officers asked to look in the accused's bag. The accused put his bag down and unzipped it. When the accused was unzipping the bag, the officer went to touch the bag. The accused pulled it away, looking nervous. The officer signaled another officer to have a drug-sniffing dog sniff the man's bag. The dog indicated the presence of drugs in the bag. The officers arrested the accused for possession of and/or trafficking in drugs, searched him, and found drugs on his person and in his bag.

== Lower court rulings ==
=== Trial Court ===
At trial, the judge found that the accused was neither detained nor searched unlawfully and that the odours from the bag, which emanated freely in a public transportation facility, did not constitute information in which the accused had a reasonable expectation of privacy. Accordingly, section 8 of the Charter was not implicated.

=== Court of Appeal ===
On appeal, the Alberta Court of Appeal agreed with the trial judge that there had been no detention and that the question was whether the ordinary citizen who has committed no offence has a reasonable expectation of privacy which would be significantly invaded by the police action in question. To determine whether the accused had a reasonable expectation of privacy, the following factors were considered:

- that the police were in a purely public place (not the yard of a home)
- that the dog only yielded a crude piece of information (yes or no to the presence of an unknown quantity of an unknown illegal drug)
- that no intimate details of private lives could be revealed
- that the odors came out passively
- and that they were detected by something similar to (but more sensitive than) an ordinary human nose.

The Court concluded that there was no reasonable expectation of privacy for that limited information in that public place and that there was no search. He agreed with the trial judge that even if there had been a Charter breach, the evidence ought not to be excluded under section 24(2) of the Charter.

== Supreme Court ruling ==
The accused appealed to the Supreme Court. The Court found that the search and detention violated section 8 of the Charter and that the evidence should be excluded because it would interfere with the fairness of justice under section 24(2) of the Charter. Hence, the conviction was set aside.

The following issues were put to the Court:

1. Whether the dog sniff constituted a search;
2. If so, whether the search was reasonable;
3. If the search was unreasonable and the appellant's rights were violated, whether the evidence ought to be excluded under s. 24(2) of the Canadian Charter of Rights and Freedoms; and
4. Whether the common law powers of police to investigate crime include the use of sniffer dogs.

=== Opinion of the Court ===
All nine judges agreed that the dog sniff of the passenger's bag at the bus station amounted to a search within section 8 of the Charter.

McLachlin CJ and Binnie, LeBel, Fish, Abella and Charron JJ agreed that the sniffer dog search of the passenger’s bag at the bus station violated section 8 of the Charter and that in the circumstances of this case, the evidence should be excluded pursuant to section 24(2) of the Charter.

According to LeBel, Fish, Abella and Charon JJ, the sniffer-dog search breached section 8 because such a search was not specifically authorized by statute. In determining whether the police were authorized at common law to conduct the search in fulfillment of their general duty to investigate crime, the threshold for the exercise of police powers should not be lowered to one of "reasonable suspicion", since to do so would impair the important safeguards found in section 8 against unjustified state intrusion. The existing and well-established standard of "reasonable and probable grounds" should be applied. In this case, the search did not meet this standard.

According to McLachlin CJ and Binnie J, a proper balance between an individual's section 8 rights and the reasonable demands of law enforcement would be struck by permitting such "sniff" searches on a "reasonable suspicion" standard without requiring prior judicial authorization.

=== Reasonable suspicion standard ===
"Suspicion" is an expectation that the targeted individual is possibly engaged in some criminal activity. A "reasonable" suspicion means something more than a mere suspicion and something less than a belief based upon reasonable and probable grounds. Because sniffer dog searches are conducted without prior judicial authorization, the after-the-fact judicial scrutiny of the grounds for the alleged "reasonable suspicion" must be rigorous. Here, the police action was based on speculation. The sniff in this case was an unreasonable search since the RCMP officer did not have grounds for reasonable suspicion at the time the dog was called. However, because of R v MacKenzie, [2013] 3 SCR 250, 2013 SCC 50 (CanLII), police can now simply draw on their experience in the field to create broad categories of “suspicious” behaviour into which almost anyone could fall. Such an approach risks transforming the already flexible standard of reasonable suspicion into the “generalized” suspicion standard.

=== Dissents ===
Bastarache, Deschamps and Rothstein JJ dissented. They found that the dog sniff of the passenger's bag at the bus station amounted to a search under section 8 of the Charter. However, there is no need to determine whether the evidence should be excluded pursuant to section 24(2) of the Charter because the sniffer dog search of the passenger’s bag at the bus station did not violate section 8 of the Charter.

== See also ==
- List of Supreme Court of Canada cases (McLachlin Court)
- R v AM, 2008 SCC 19, a similar case that was heard on the same day as R v Kang-Brown
