= Burnaby South Secondary School =

Burnaby South Secondary
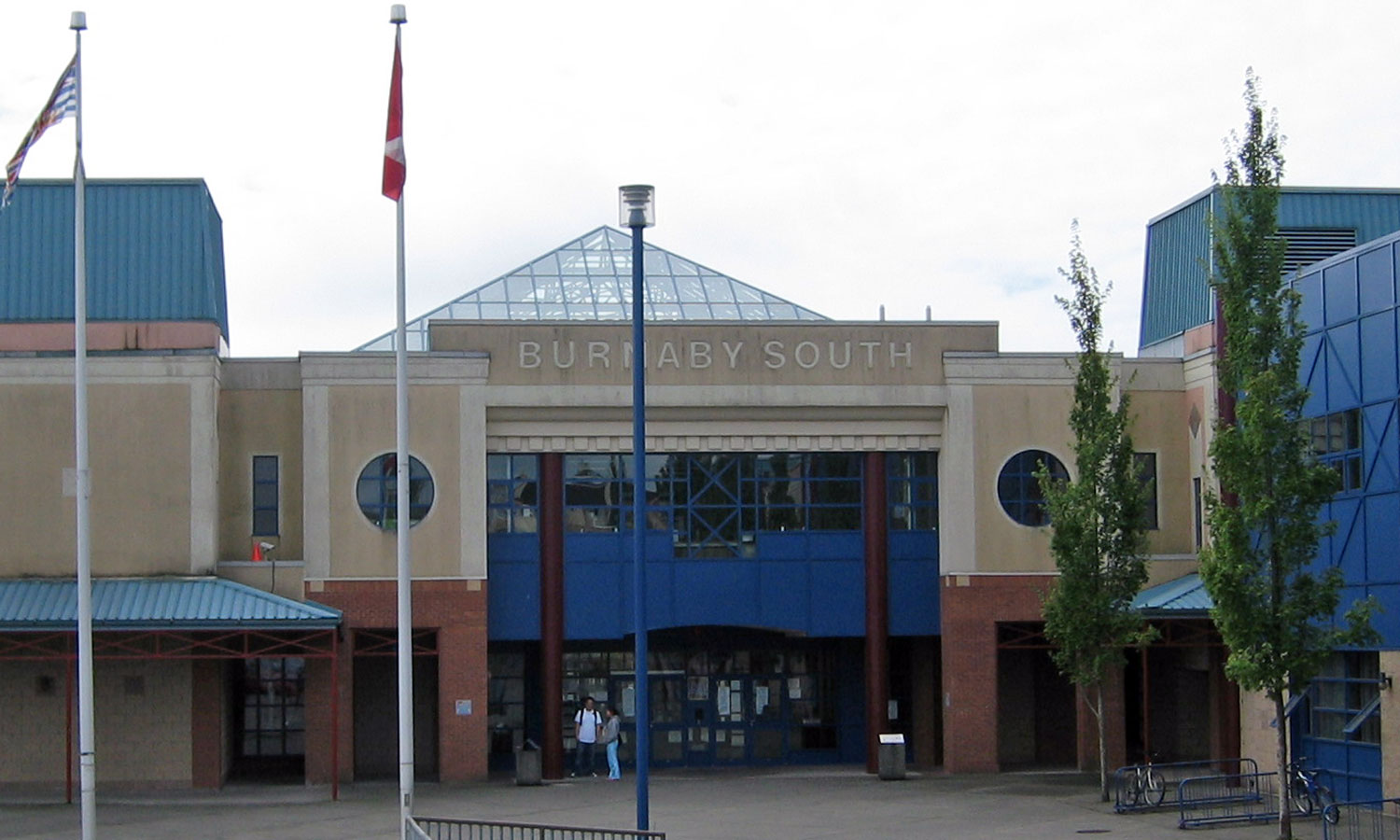

Location
- 5455 Rumble St; Burnaby, British Columbia, V5J 2B7; Canada; 49°12′58″N 122°59′7″W

Information
- School type: Public, high school
- Founded: 1922
- School board: School District 41 Burnaby
- School number: 4141062
- Principal: Effie Aadland
- Staff: 104
- Grades: 8–12
- Enrollment: 1693 (2015)
- Language: English, ASL
- Area: South Slope
- Mascot: "Rebels" – animal is a rhino
- Team name: Rebels
- Website: south.burnabyschools.ca

Burnaby South Secondary is a public high school in Burnaby, British Columbia, and it serves the South Slope, Burnaby neighbourhood, and Southern Burnaby. It is one of the eight high schools within School District 41 Burnaby, and it currently contains approximately 1700 students. The campus is shared with the secondary school for BC School for the Deaf.

== History ==
Today, students attending Burnaby South go to school in a modern building constructed in 1993 at 5455 Rumble Street.

The first Burnaby South Secondary school opened with 175 students in 1922 at 6626 Kingsway, in an old building built in 1913 that previously served as Kingsway East Elementary school.

Over the years, the school expanded to accommodate more students. A new stucco building was constructed on the grounds in 1940, and in the 1960s, a new vocational wing was added, with a cafeteria and room for vocational programs.

The decision was made in 1991 to construct a new school which was built in time for the start of the school year in September 1993.

Developed as a Year 2000 school, the building incorporated a significant amount of technology, including monitors in all the halls and classrooms in place of PAs and a card swipe attendance system. Former B.C. Premier Christy Clark graduated from Burnaby South in 1983.

Feeder schools include Clinton, Glenwood, Maywood, Nelson, South Slope/BC School for the Deaf, Stride Avenue, Suncrest, Taylor Park, and Windsor.

== Facilities ==
Facilities include two tournament sized gymnasiums, a fitness/dance room, a weight room, a wrestling room, and a large indoor running track encircling the physical education facility; a professional 600 seat community theatre, called The Michael J. Fox Theatre; lab facilities in science, home economics, art, drama, business education, and technology education; and Southpoint, the school store run by Marketing students.

Sports teams are available from grades 8–12 for basketball, wrestling, swimming, golf, soccer, rugby, volleyball, badminton, tennis, and dragon boating.

Burnaby South also offers many clubs and councils to its students.

== Academics ==
The school offers a wide variety of honours courses and 21 Advanced Placement courses. In 2013, the Burnaby School District announced that the school would be offering the AP Capstone Diploma Program in the 2014/15 year. As of 2019, it is one of only ten schools across Canada that offer the program.

== Notable alumni ==
- Karan Aujla, artist
- Christy Clark, 35th Premier of British Columbia
- Ian James Corlett, professional voice actor, writer
- Matt Hughes, author
- Christine Sinclair, professional soccer player, Olympic Gold Medalist
