= Cariboo Hill Secondary School =

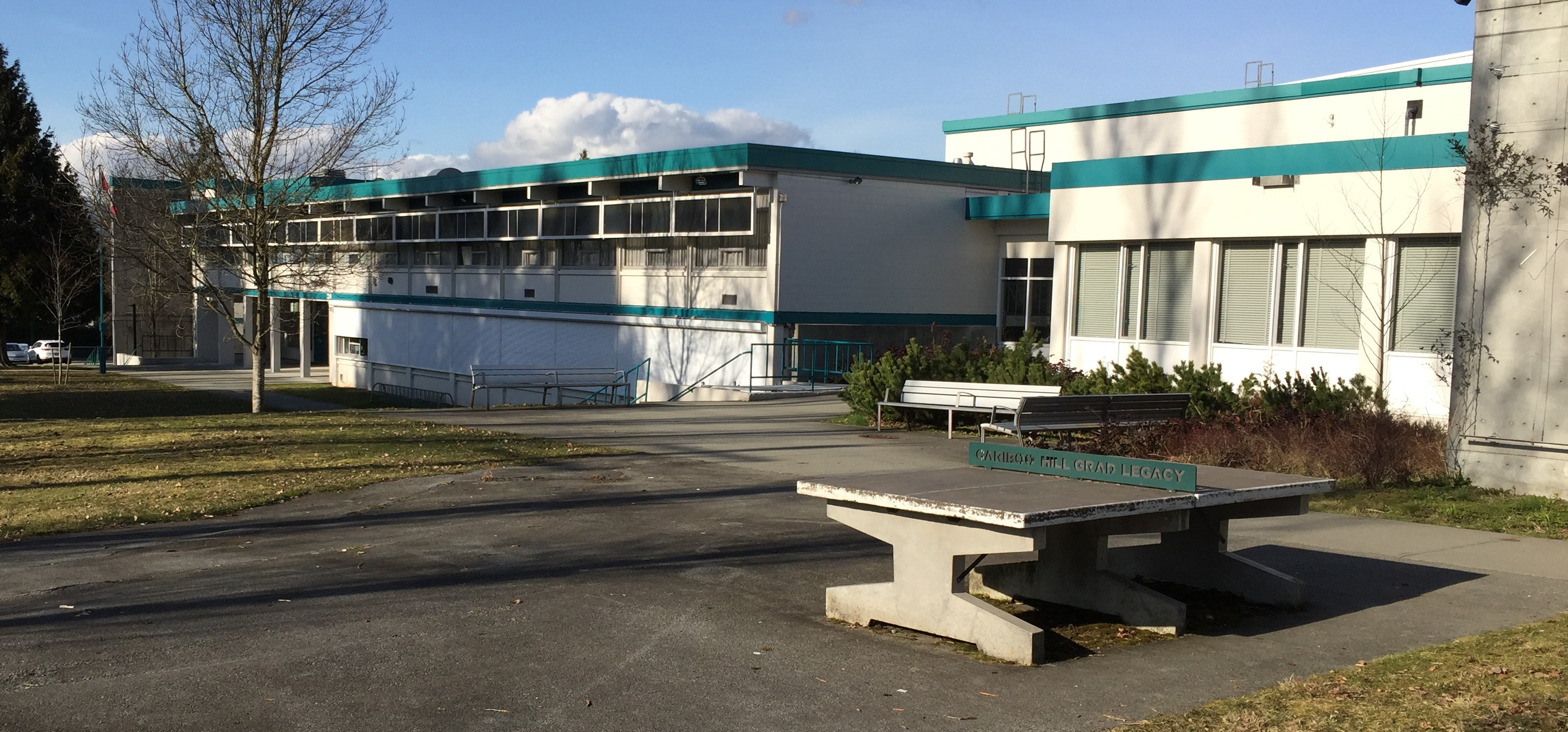

Location
- 8580 16th Ave; Burnaby, British Columbia, V3N 1S6; Canada; 49.232326°N 122.913755°W

Information
- School type: Public, secondary school
- School board: School District 41 Burnaby
- Area trustee: Bill Brassington
- School number: 4141007
- Principal: Tim Wozney
- Staff: 54
- Grades: 8–12
- Enrollment: 624 (2015)
- Language: English, French
- Colours: Blue, yellow
- Mascot: Charlie the Charger
- Team name: Chargers
- Website: cariboohill.burnabyschools.ca

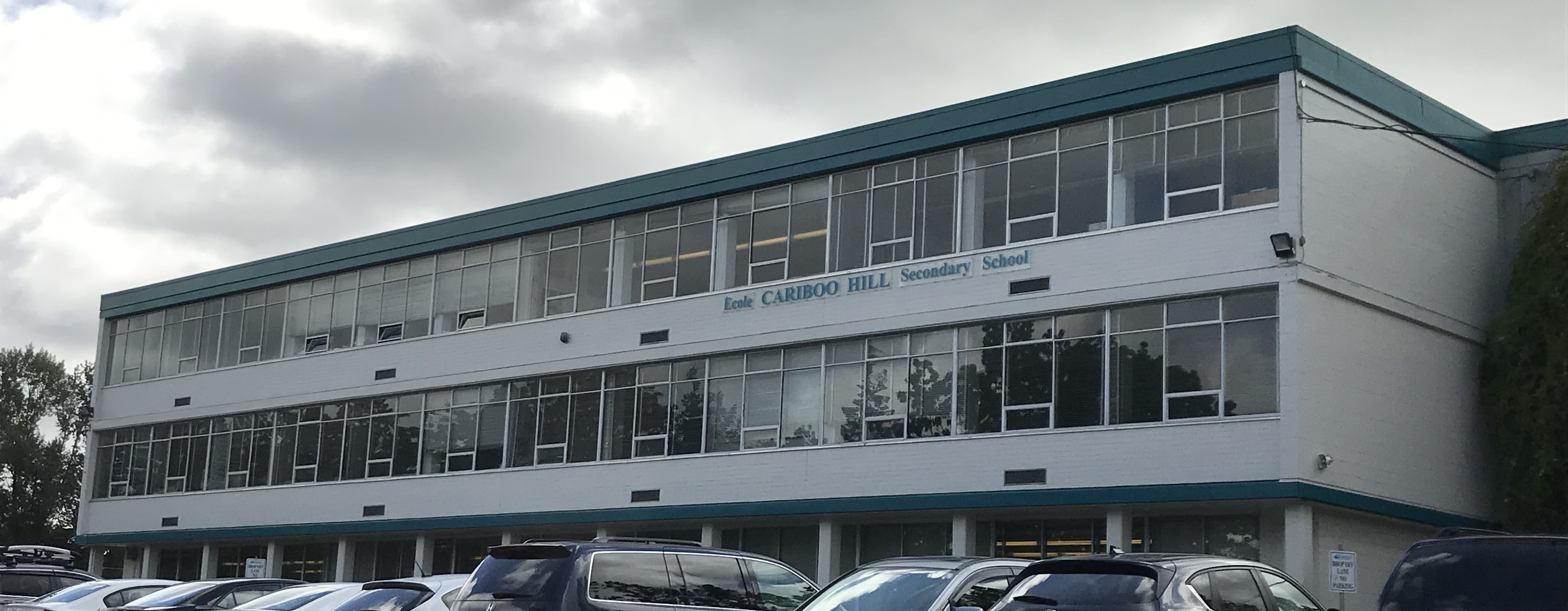
Cariboo Hill Secondary School from its parking lot

Cariboo Hill Secondary School is a public secondary school in Burnaby, British Columbia, and part of School District 41 Burnaby. Famous alumni include singer Michael Bublé. Other notable alumni include Emilio Rogazy and Luka Balenovic, members of the post-punk band La Haine.
