= 2025 CEBL Draft =

Canadian Elite Basketball League draft

General information
- Sport: Basketball
- Date: April 10, 2025

Overview
- 30 total selections in 3 rounds
- League: Canadian Elite Basketball League
- Teams: 10
- First selection: Sultan Haider Bhatti (Montreal Alliance)

The 2025 CEBL Draft, the 7th edition of the Canadian Elite Basketball League's annual draft, was announced on April 10, 2025. The 10 teams of the CEBL took turns selecting U Sports and Canadian Collegiate Athletic Association athletes to add to their rosters. The first overall selection was made by the Montreal Alliance, who selected Sultan Haider Bhatti of the Brandon Bobcats. This was the first time the Draft results were unveiled live on CEBL+.

== Format ==
The draft order for the first round was determined by how the teams finished in the 2024 CEBL season, with the last-placed Montreal Alliance obtaining the 1st overall pick. Employing a "snake draft" format, the order is reversed in even-numbered rounds, and returns to the original order in odd-numbered rounds. The draft order for the first round was determined as follows:

1. Montreal Alliance
2. Brampton Honey Badgers
3. Saskatchewan Rattlers
4. Ottawa Blackjacks
5. Winnipeg Sea Bears
6. Calgary Surge
7. Scarborough Shooting Stars
8. Edmonton Stingers
9. Niagara River Lions
10. Vancouver Bandits

== Player selection ==
=== Round 1 ===
| Pick | Team | Player | Position | Hometown | School team |
|---|---|---|---|---|---|
| 1 | Montreal Alliance | Sultan Haider Bhatti | G/W | Laval, QC | Brandon Bobcats |
| 2 | Brampton Honey Badgers | Yohann Sam | G | Brampton, ON | Windsor Lancers |
| 3 | Saskatchewan Rattlers | Declan Peterson | F | Bentley, AB | Calgary Dinos |
| 4 | Ottawa BlackJacks | Justin Ndjock-Tadjoré | W | Gatineau, QC | Ottawa Gee-Gees |
| 5 | Winnipeg Sea Bears | Geoffrey James | G | Edmonton, AB | Victoria Vikes |
| 6 | Calgary Surge | DJ Jackson | G/W | Mississauga, ON | St. Francis Xavier X-Men |
| 7 | Scarborough Shooting Stars | David Walker | G/W | Toronto, ON | TMU Bold |
| 8 | Edmonton Stingers | Aaron Rhooms | W | Toronto, ON | TMU Bold |
| 9 | Niagara River Lions | Gatluak James | W | Windsor, ON | St. Francis Xavier X-Men |
| 10 | Vancouver Bandits | Nikola Guzina | F | Vancouver, BC | UBC Thunderbirds |

=== Round 2 ===
| Pick | Team | Player | Position | Hometown | School team |
|---|---|---|---|---|---|
| 11 | Vancouver Bandits | Mikyle Malabuyoc | G | Vancouver, BC | Western Mustangs |
| 12 | Niagara River Lions | Charles Robert | F | Vaudreuil-Dorion, QC | Bishop's Gaiters |
| 13 | Edmonton Stingers | Liai Tong | W | St. John’s, NL | Cape Breton Capers |
| 14 | Scarborough Shooting Stars | Koat Thomas | G/W | Waterloo, ON | St. Francis Xavier X-Men |
| 15 | Calgary Surge | Javier Gilgeous-Glasgow | G | Brampton, ON | TMU Bold |
| 16 | Winnipeg Sea Bears | Mason Kraus | G | Winnipeg, MB | Manitoba Bisons |
| 17 | Ottawa BlackJacks | Alvin Icyogere | G/W | Ottawa, ON | Nipissing Lakers |
| 18 | Saskatchewan Rattlers | Isaac Simon | G | Regina, SK | Alberta Golden Bears |
| 19 | Brampton Honey Badgers | Conner Landell | F | Niagara Falls, ON | UNB Reds |
| 20 | Montreal Alliance | Liam Rietschin | F | Toronto, ON | York Lions |

=== Round 3 ===
| Pick | Team | Player | Position | Hometown | School team |
|---|---|---|---|---|---|
| 21 | Montreal Alliance | Jaheem Joseph | G | Ottawa, ON | Concordia Stingers |
| 22 | Brampton Honey Badgers | Mike Demagus | G/W | Scarborough, ON | McMaster Marauders |
| 23 | Saskatchewan Rattlers | Easton Thimm | F | Saskatoon, SK | Saskatchewan Huskies |
| 24 | Ottawa BlackJacks | Malik Grant | G/W | Brampton, ON | Humber Hawks (CCAA) |
| 25 | Winnipeg Sea Bears | Brendan Amoyaw | F | Winnipeg, MB | McMaster Marauders |
| 26 | Calgary Surge | William Tong | F | Calgary, AB | SAIT Trojans (CCAA) |
| 27 | Scarborough Shooting Stars | Samuel Wong | G | Scarborough, ON | Centennial Colts (CCAA) |
| 28 | Edmonton Stingers | Jalen Shirley | G | Brampton, ON | UBC Okanagan Heat |
| 29 | Niagara River Lions | Thierry Tshibola | G | Quebec City, QC | Brock Badgers |
| 30 | Vancouver Bandits | David Mutabazi | G/W | Delta, BC | Trinity Western Spartans |

== NCAA Transfers ==
Several players selected in the draft later elected to leave their CEBL clubs in order to join NCAA basketball teams. Third-overall pick Declan Peterson joined the Western Michigan Broncos after the conclusion of the Saskatchewan Rattlers's training camp. Vancouver-native and Bandits second round pick MiKyle Malabuyoc left the team after appearing in 1 game due to his transfer to the NCAA Division II Simon Fraser Red Leafs. The cousin of NBA superstar Shai Gilgeous-Alexander, Javier Gilgeous-Glasgow made 11 appearances for the Western Conference Champion Surge before joining the Troy Trojans.
