= Big Bend, Burnaby =

Neighourhood in Burnaby, British Columbia

Big Bend
- Neighbourhood
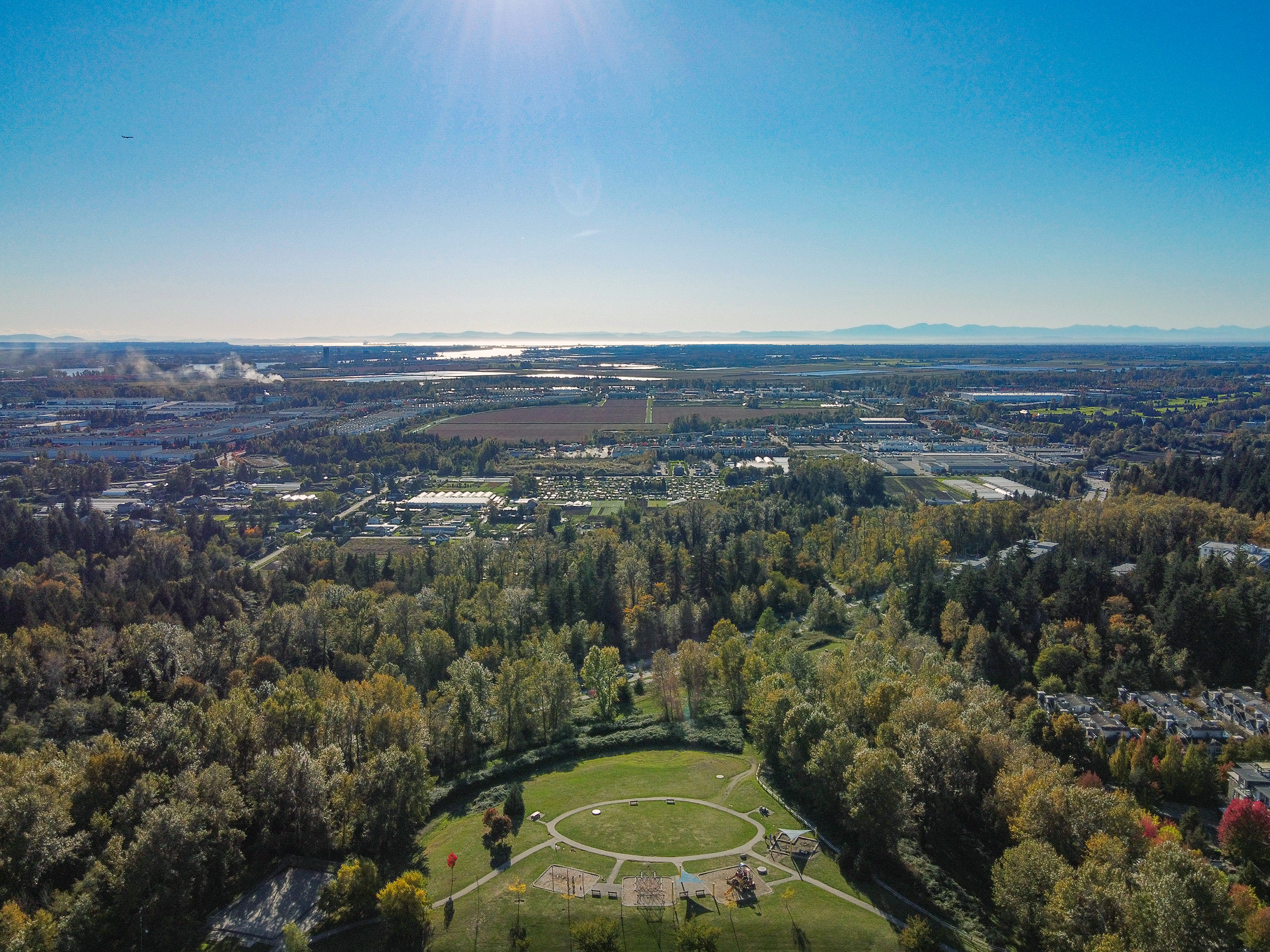
- Aerial view of Big Bend from Taylor Park in Edmonds (2025)

- Location in Metro Vancouver
- Coordinates: 49.198°N 122.979°W
- Country: Canada
- Province: British Columbia
- City: Burnaby

Big Bend is the southernmost neighbourhood in Burnaby, British Columbia, Canada, located on the watershed of the Fraser River. The neighbourhood owes its name to the large bend that the river forms on its North Arm. Big Bend comprises all of Burnaby south of Marine Drive.

== History ==
Big Bend, originally called "Fraser Arm," has been an agricultural community since 1861. The British Columbia Electric Railway tram line cut through the neighbourhood, with many streets today bearing the same names as the former tramway's multiple stations. The same right-of-way is used for freight today.

== Boundaries ==
Big Bend is bounded by Marine Drive to the north, Fenwick Street to the east, the Fraser River to the south and Boundary Road to the west.

== Geography ==
Big Bend is flat and to the north borders the more rugged South Slope neighbourhood of Burnaby. Due to its unique geography and proximity to the Fraser River it remains a flood risk; in December 2014, 100 millimeters of rain flooded parts of Big Bend, although the City of Burnaby's dike system and other anti-flood measures mitigated the damage.

== Demographics ==
The neighbourhood is very thinly populated and consists of productive farmland, industrial parks, movie studios, and commercial areas such as the Big Bend Crossing and Market Crossing malls to the north and south of Marine Way. The formerly narrow and quiet Byrne Road now fronts many commercial businesses along the route to the popular Burnaby Fraser Foreshore Park, which offers riverside paths and trails, outdoor gym equipment, an off-leash dog zone, picnic and fishing spots, and a playground. A Youth Custody services centre is also located in the neighbourhood.

== Agriculture ==
Big Bend is known for being the only "true" farmland left on the Burrard Peninsula. It maintains small to medium-sized farms, community farms north of Marine Way on Willard Street, and almost six hectares of community gardens on Meadow Avenue. The farms are privately owned, and they are protected under the Agricultural Land Reserve. Chinese-Canadians have for decades leased or owned market gardens on the rich soils of Big Bend after draining the natural cranberry marshes once used by First Nations.

== Environment ==
There are several creeks that pass through, or empty into, the neighbourhood, including Boundary Creek, Kaymar Creek, Gray Creek, Frogger's Creek, John Mathews Creek, Byrne Creek, and Jerry Rogers' Creek. Many of these creeks are salmonoid bearing, while the associated urban woods support coyote, beaver, muskrat, garter snake, salamander, and various bird populations.

== Main roads ==
Main roads include Marine Way (which continues to New Westminster and links to the Queensborough Bridge), Marine Drive, North Fraser Way, and Byrne Road.

== Schools ==
- Glenwood Elementary School (K-7), located on Marine Drive.
