= R v M (MR) =

- Supreme Court of Canada

Hearing: June 25, 1998 Judgment: November 26, 1998
- Full case name: MRM v Her Majesty The Queen
- Citations: [1998] 3 SCR 393
- Ruling: Students' right to privacy against unreasonable searches may be overridden if school authorities have reasonable grounds to believe that the student may be breaching school regulations.

Court membership
- Chief Justice: Antonio Lamer; Puisne Justices: Claire L'Heureux-Dubé, Charles Gonthier, Peter Cory, Beverley McLachlin, Frank Iacobucci, John C. Major, Michel Bastarache, Ian Binnie

Reasons given
- Majority: Lamer CJ, joined by L'Heureux‑Dubé, Gonthier, Cory, McLachlin, Iacobucci, Bastarache and Binnie JJ
- Dissent: Major J

R v M (MR), [1998] 3 SCR 393 is a leading decision of the Supreme Court of Canada on search and seizure by teachers and principals in Canadian schools (not colleges or universities). In this case, a student's section 8 rights under the Canadian Charter of Rights and Freedoms ("Charter") were not violated by being searched by a school principal with a police constable present.

== Background ==
A vice-principal of a junior high school in Nova Scotia had been informed by some students that another student, M.R., had planned to sell drugs at an upcoming school dance. The vice-principal asked M.R. and his friend to come to his office. The vice-principal advised them that he was going to search them for drugs. An RCMP officer, who had been called there by the vice-principal according to school policy, was in the office but did not interfere.

M.R. emptied his pockets and, after being asked by the vice-principal to do so, pulled up his pant legs. There was a bulge in his sock. The vice-principal removed a plastic bag of marijuana. The bag was given to the police officer who advised M.R. that he was under arrest for possession of a narcotic.

The constable read the police caution to M.R., told him that he had a right to counsel (a lawyer) and that he had the right to contact a parent or adult. M.R. tried to reach his mother but was not able to get in touch with her. He said that he did not want to call anyone else. The officer and M.R. then went to M.R.'s locker and searched it. No more drugs were found.

The case went to court. M.R.'s lawyer argued that his client's rights had been violated. Cousel pointed to two sections of the Charter. First, section 8 guarantees everyone has the right to be secure against "unreasonable search and seizure". Second, section 10(b) states that "everyone has the right on arrest or detention to retain and instruct counsel without delay and to be informed of that right". According to the defence, both sections had been violated.

== Opinion of the Court ==
The Supreme Court disagreed.

First, it was assumed, for the purposes of this case, that schools were a part of government and that the Charter therefore applied to the actions of the vice-principal.

Second, in order for an action to be a "search or seizure" under the Charter, the person being searched must have a "reasonable expectation of privacy". Given he was a student, did M.R. have "reasonable expectation of privacy"? The Supreme Court held he did not: "The reasonable expectation of privacy of a student in attendance at a school is certainly less than it would be in other circumstances. Students know that their teachers and other school authorities are responsible for providing a safe environment and maintaining order and discipline in the school. They must know that this may sometimes require searches of students and their personal effects and the seizure of prohibited items. It would not be reasonable for a student to expect to be free from such searches."

In fact, the provincial Education Act implied that searches were reasonable and acceptable. The court concluded that the search was authorized by law, that the law was reasonable, and (in this particular case) that the vice-principal had acted reasonably. Moreover, the court ruled that a teacher or principal does not have to get a warrant to search a student if he or she has reasonable grounds (a good reason) to believe that a school rule has been or is being broken and if he or she has good reason to believe that evidence of the violation will be found in the location or on the person of the student searched. Reasonable grounds can be information received from just one student if the principal or teacher thinks that the student is credible.

Third, M.R.'s lawyer had argued that section 10(b) had been violated because his client had not received counsel immediately after being detained in the vice-principal's office. The court ruled that this section did not apply to "detentions" within a school environment since it was designed to apply to cases where a person was detained by the police during a criminal investigation.

The factors to be considered in determining whether a search conducted by a teacher or principal in the school environment was reasonable can be summarized in this manner:

1. The first step is to determine whether it can be inferred from the provisions of the relevant Education Act that teachers and principals are authorized to conduct searches of their students in appropriate circumstances. In the school environment such a statutory authorization would be reasonable.
2. The search itself must be carried out in a reasonable manner. It should be conducted in a sensitive manner and be minimally intrusive.
3. In order to determine whether a search was reasonable, all the surrounding circumstances will have to be considered.

== See also ==
- List of Supreme Court of Canada cases
- R v AM
