= School District 41 Burnaby =

School District In The Lower Mainland

- School District 41 Burnaby Logo

Location
- Burnaby Burnaby in Metro/Coast Canada

District information
- Superintendent: Gina Niccoli-Moen
- Schools: 49
- Budget: CA$169.3 million

Students and staff
- Students: 25,000
- Staff: 4,000

Other information
- Website: burnabyschools.ca

School District 41 Burnaby is a school district in British Columbia, Canada, with 41 elementary schools and 8 secondary schools. The district serves the City of Burnaby, located immediately east of Vancouver. The district has an enrollment of approximately 25,000 students.

== Schools ==
Elementary schools
School	Location	Grades
Armstrong Elementary School	Burnaby	K-7
Aubrey Elementary School	Burnaby	K-7
Brantford Elementary School	Burnaby	K-7
Brentwood Park Elementary School	Burnaby	K-7
Buckingham Elementary School	Burnaby	K-7
Cameron Elementary School	Burnaby	K-7
Capitol Hill Elementary School	Burnaby	K-7
Cascade Heights Elementary School	Burnaby	K-7
Chaffey-Burke Elementary School	Burnaby	K-7
Clinton Elementary School	Burnaby	K-7
Confederation Park Elementary School	Burnaby	K-7
Douglas Road Elementary School	Burnaby	K-7
Edmonds Community School	Burnaby	K-7
Forest Grove Elementary School	Burnaby	K-7
Gilmore Community Elementary School	Burnaby	K-7
Gilpin Elementary School	Burnaby	K-7
Glenwood Elementary School (Burnaby)	Burnaby	K-7
Inman Elementary School	Burnaby	K-7
Kitchener Elementary School	Burnaby	K-7
Lakeview Elementary School (Burnaby)	Burnaby	K-7
Lochdale Community School	Burnaby	K-7
Lyndhurst Elementary School	Burnaby	K-7
Marlborough Elementary School	Burnaby	K-7
Maywood Community School	Burnaby	K-7
Montecito Elementary School	Burnaby	K-7
Morley Elementary School	Burnaby	K-7
Nelson Elementary School	Burnaby	K-7
Parkcrest Elementary School	Burnaby	K-7
Rosser Elementary School	Burnaby	K-7
Seaforth Elementary School	Burnaby	K-7
Second Street Community School	Burnaby	K-7
South Slope Elementary School	Burnaby	K-7
Sperling Elementary School	Burnaby	K-7
Stoney Creek Community School	Burnaby	K-7
Stride Avenue Community School	Burnaby	K-7
Suncrest Elementary School	Burnaby	K-7
Taylor Park Elementary School	Burnaby	K-7
Twelfth Avenue Elementary School	Burnaby	K-7
Westridge Elementary School	Burnaby	K-7
Windsor Elementary School	Burnaby	K-7

Other programs and secondary schools
School	Location	Grades
Alpha Secondary School	Burnaby	8-12
BC Provincial School for the Deaf	Burnaby	K-12
Burnaby Central Secondary School	Burnaby	8-12
Burnaby Continuing Education	Burnaby	10-12
Burnaby Mountain Secondary School	Burnaby	8-12
Burnaby North Secondary School	Burnaby	8-12
Burnaby On-Line Program	Burnaby	1-12
Burnaby South Secondary School	Burnaby	8-12
Byrne Creek Secondary School	Burnaby	8-12
Canada Way Learning Centre	Burnaby	12
Cariboo Hill Secondary School	Burnaby	8-12
Fraser Park Secondary Program	Burnaby	
Maples Secondary Program	Burnaby	
Moscrop Secondary School	Burnaby	8-12

== See also ==
- BC School for the Deaf, Elementary
- List of school districts in British Columbia
