= 2025 CEBL season =

- League: Canadian Elite Basketball League
- Sport: Basketball
- Duration: Season: May 11 – August 10; Playoffs: August 14–24
- Games: 24 per team
- Teams: 10
- TV partner: TSN

Draft
- Top draft pick: Sultan Haider Bhatti
- Picked by: Montreal Alliance

Regular season
- Top seed: Vancouver Bandits
- Season MVP: Mitch Creek
- Top scorer: Javonte Smart

Championship Weekend
- Venue: Canada Life Centre; Winnipeg, Manitoba
- Champions: Niagara River Lions (2nd title)
- Runners-up: Calgary Surge
- Finals MVP: Khalil Ahmad

Seasons
- ← 2024 2026 →

The 2025 CEBL season is the seventh season of the Canadian Elite Basketball League (CEBL). The regular season began on May 11 and ended on August 10. The league now plays a 24-game season, 4 more than the previous 20-game schedule.

On May 25, 2025, the Montreal Alliance played the Ottawa BlackJacks at IGA Stadium in Montreal, the first professional basketball game played outdoors in Canadian basketball history. However, the game was suspended at halftime due to court conditions and declared a no contest.

== Regular season ==
=== Standings ===
==== Western Conference ====
Pos	Team	Pld	W	L	PF	PA	PD	PCT	Qualification
1	Vancouver Bandits	24	19	5	2372	2122	+250	.792	Advance to quarter-finals
2	Calgary Surge	24	17	7	2287	2093	+194	.708	Advance to play in games
3	Edmonton Stingers	24	15	9	2256	2183	+73	.625	Advance to play in games
4	Winnipeg Sea Bears (H)	24	11	13	2052	2141	−89	.458	Advance to championship weekend (Note: Automatically qualified for championship weekend as the host team.)
5	Saskatchewan Rattlers	24	7	17	2054	2248	−194	.292	

Source: CEBL
(H) Hosts

==== Eastern Conference ====
Pos	Team	Pld	W	L	PF	PA	PD	PCT	Qualification
1	Niagara River Lions	24	14	10	2062	2121	−59	.583	Advance to championship weekend
2	Ottawa BlackJacks	24	12	12	2217	2143	+74	.500	Advance to quarter-finals
3	Scarborough Shooting Stars	24	11	13	2146	2137	+9	.458	Advance to play in games
4	Montreal Alliance	24	9	15	2103	2121	−18	.375	Advance to play in games
5	Brampton Honey Badgers	24	5	19	1935	2175	−240	.208	

Source: CEBL

=== Attendance ===
As of August 10, 2025

Pos	Team	Total	High	Low	Average	Change
1	Winnipeg Sea Bears	92,103	10,649	5,871	7,675	−11.5%
2	Vancouver Bandits	53,192	5,504	3,708	4,432	+13.9%
3	Calgary Surge	40,286	6,954	2,336	3,357	−2.7%
4	Edmonton Stingers	35,318	3,421	2,017	2,943	−14.0%
5	Montreal Alliance	34,726	3,397 (Note: The cancelled Summer Classic had a reported attendance of 9,305. As the game was not official, it does not count towards league attendance.)	2,522	2,893	+7.3%
6	Niagara River Lions	28,739	4,454	1,800	2,394	−15.6%
7	Saskatchewan Rattlers	27,645	3,518	1,500	2,303	−1.5%
8	Ottawa BlackJacks	23,859	3,270	1,443	1,988	−3.1%
9	Scarborough Shooting Stars	17,698	1,748	1,205	1,474	−1.7%
10	Brampton Honey Badgers	17,687	3,214	753	1,473	−26.3%
	League total	371,253	10,649	753	3,093	−6.2%

== Results ==
Teams	BHB	CGY	EDM	MON	NIA	OTT	SSK	SSS	VAN	WPG	BHB	CGY	EDM	MON	NIA	OTT	SSK	SSS	VAN	WPG
Brampton Honey Badgers	—	85–94	95–91	71–92	91–66	76–89	88–86	76–90	85–89	81–74	—				84–86	73–101		96–89		
Calgary Surge	90–85	—	95–98	107–91	94–76	107–93	84–87	94–80	100–83	93–61		—					105–76		98–96	78–79
Edmonton Stingers	99–81	84–86	—	94–83	92–81	93–74	88–90	98–81	95–104	98–85		113–90	—						105–121	97–77
Montreal Alliance	88–66	82–99	105–83	—	73–77	83–87	93–89	73–101	87–94	81–94	103–83			—		87–79		89–94		
Niagara River Lions	94–80	98–94	88–106	93–82	—	93–96	87–89	98–94	96–77	93–82	97–79			91–89	—			96–81		
Ottawa BlackJacks	105–83	101–112	85–87	90–77	85–87	—	96–97	100–93	112–130	104–80	91–77			98–92	89–90	—				
Saskatchewan Rattlers	96–85	96–89	89–92	80–82	86–87	93–90	—	93–101	65–105	70–94		81–103	94–100				—		76–101	
Scarborough Shooting Stars	86–71	93–89	75–81	88–108	102–70	87–86	91–84	—	95–102	86–87				80–92	81–64	78–97		—		
Vancouver Bandits	87–84	80–95	109–79	91–82	109–72	95–81	97–85	100–97	—	85–92			111–99				100–79		—	106–74
Winnipeg Sea Bears	92–60	86–98	92–89	92–89	86–81	73–88	91–84	93–103	89–100	—		89–93	92–95				98–89			—

Source: CEBL
Legend: Blue = left column team win; Red = top row team win.

== Play-offs ==
=== Bracket ===
Play-in round August 14
E3	Scarborough	92
E4	Montreal	86
W2	Calgary	103
W3	Edmonton	95

Quarterfinals; August 16
E2	Ottawa	81
E3	Scarborough	114
W1	Vancouver	103
W2	Calgary	105

Semifinals; August 22
E1	Niagara	93
E3	Scarborough	91
W2	Calgary	90
W4	Winnipeg	79

Championship; August 24
E1	Niagara	79
W2	Calgary	73

=== Play-in games ===
Note: all times are local

TSN2

August 14
7:00pm

box score

Scarborough Shooting Stars 92, Montreal Alliance 86
Scoring by quarter: 22–14, 25–24, 23–20, 22–28
Pts: Terquavion Smith 27; Rebs: Khalil Miller 11; Asts: Donovan Smith, Terquavion Smith 6	Pts: Quincy Guerrier 30; Rebs: Quincy Guerrier 11; Asts: Tavian Dunn-Martin 10

Toronto Pan Am Sports Centre, Scarborough, Ontario
Attendance: 1,554
Referees: Jayson Stiell, Tommy Wu, Tony Turnbull

TSN2

August 14
7:30pm

box score

Calgary Surge 103, Edmonton Stingers 95
Scoring by quarter: 25–25, 23–25, 30–19, 25–26
Pts: Evan Gilyard II 28; Rebs: Greg Brown III 8 Asts: Gabe Osabuohien 8	Pts: Sean East II 36; Rebs: Scottie Lindsay 9 Asts: Keon Ambrose-Hylton 5

WinSport Event Centre, Calgary, Alberta
Attendance: 2,776
Referees: Perry Stothart, Tanner Cervo, Reed Scott

=== Quarterfinals ===
TSN4

August 16
1:00pm

box score

Ottawa BlackJacks 81, Scarborough Shooting Stars 114
Scoring by quarter: 25–26, 17–28, 25–29, 14–31
Pts: David Walker 19; Rebs: Justin Ndjock-Tadjore 9 Asts: Calvin Epistola 6	Pts: Donovan Williams 26; Rebs: Khalil Miller 17; Asts: Kobe Elvis 7

Centre Slush Puppie, Gatineau, Quebec
Attendance: 2,006
Referees: Greg Spagnoli, Chris Buccella, Farhan Baig

TSN4

August 16
12:30pm

box score

Vancouver Bandits 103, Calgary Surge 105
Scoring by quarter: 27–26, 24–35, 23–17, 29–27
Pts: Zach Copeland 30; Rebs: Tyrese Samuel 13; Asts: Mitch Creek 7	Pts: Jameer Nelson Jr. 39; Rebs: Evan Gilyard II 8 Asts: Evan Gilyard II 6

Langley Events Centre, Langley, B.C.
Attendance: 5,081
Referees: Waseem Husainy, Ryley Kerrison, Neil Donnelly

== Championship Weekend ==
=== Semifinals ===
TSN4

August 22
5:00pm

box score

Niagara River Lions 93, Scarborough Shooting Stars 91
Scoring by quarter: 25–26, 24–24, 25–18, 19–23
Pts: Khalil Ahmad 29; Rebs: Elijah Lufile 15; Asts: Ron Curry 5	Pts: Donovan Williams 29; Rebs: Donovan Williams 11; Asts: Terquavion Smith 10

Canada Life Centre, Winnipeg, Manitoba
Attendance: 6,587
Referees: Cooper Toppings, Greg Spagnoli, Ryley Kerrison

TSN4

August 22
7:30pm

box score

Calgary Surge 90, Winnipeg Sea Bears 79
Scoring by quarter: 28–19, 14–17, 26–16, 22–27
Pts: Evan Gilyard II 24; Rebs: Greg Brown III 11; Asts: Jameer Nelson Jr., Gabe Osabuohien 4	Pts: Trevon Scott 18; Rebs: Will Richardson, Simi Shittu 10; Asts: Will Richardson 7

Canada Life Centre, Winnipeg, Manitoba
Attendance: 9,076
Referees: Jayson Stiell, Tanner Cervo, Chris Buccella

=== Championship ===
TSN3

August 24
6:00pm

box score

Calgary Surge 73, Niagara River Lions 79
Scoring by quarter: 20–21, 16–21, 15–21, 22–16
Pts: Sean Miller-Moore 19; Rebs: Greg Brown III 17; Asts: Gabe Osabuohien 5	Pts: Khalil Ahmad 16; Rebs: Khalil Ahmad, Elijah Lufile 9 Asts: Kimbal Mackenzie 5

Canada Life Centre, Winnipeg, Manitoba
Attendance: 7,129
Referees: Jayson Stiell, Cooper Toppings, Greg Spagnoli

== Awards ==
- Most Valuable Player: Mitch Creek, Vancouver Bandits
- Canadian Player of the Year: Tyrese Samuel, Vancouver Bandits
- Development Player of the Year: Isaac Simon, Saskatchewan Rattlers
- Defensive Player of the year: Jameer Nelson Jr., Calgary Surge
- Clutch Player of the Year: Tyrese Samuel, Vancouver Bandits
- Coach of the Year: Kyle Julius, Vancouver Bandits
- Sixth Man of the Year: Zane Waterman, Ottawa BlackJacks
- Officiating Recognition Award: Karl Toulouse
- Community Champion Award:
- CEBL Finals MVP: Khalil Ahmad, Niagara River Lions

=== All-CEBL teams ===
First Team		Pos.	Second Team	
Player	Team	Pos.	Player	Team
Greg Brown III	Calgary Surge	F	Tyrese Samuel	Vancouver Bandits
Mitch Creek	Vancouver Bandits	F	Simi Shittu	Winnipeg Sea Bears
Sean East II	Edmonton Stingers	G	Khalil Ahmad	Niagara River Lions
Javonte Smart	Ottawa BlackJacks	G	Jameer Nelson Jr.	Calgary Surge
Donovan Williams	Scarborough Shooting Stars	G	Terquavion Smith	Scarborough Shooting Stars

=== All-Canadian team ===
Pos.	Player	Team
F	Keon Ambrose-Hylton	Edmonton Stingers
F	Quincy Guerrier	Montreal Alliance
G	Sean Miller-Moore	Calgary Surge
F	Tyrese Samuel	Vancouver Bandits
F	Simi Shittu	Winnipeg Sea Bears
