= Vancouver Bandits =

- 2026 CEBL season
- Nickname: Bandits Basketball
- League: CEBL
- Founded: 2018
- History: Fraser Valley Bandits; 2018–2022; Vancouver Bandits; 2022–present
- Arena: Langley Events Centre
- Capacity: 5,276
- Location: Langley, British Columbia
- Team colours: Bandits Orange #ee4c0c, Bandits Black #000000, Bandits Grey #eaeaea
- President: Dylan Kular
- General manager: Kyle Julius
- Head coach: Ransford Brempong
- Ownership: Bandits Sports & Entertainment
- Conference titles: 1 (2024)
- Website: thebandits.ca
| Home | Away |

The Vancouver Bandits are a Canadian professional basketball team based in Langley, British Columbia, that competes in the Canadian Elite Basketball League (CEBL). The Bandits play home games at Langley Events Centre, located in the Metro Vancouver district. They were formerly known as the Fraser Valley Bandits, but after a sale of the team, the name was changed to the Vancouver Bandits.

== History ==
Fraser Valley was first announced as part of the Canadian Elite Basketball League (CEBL) in November 2017. On July 16, 2018, the CEBL revealed their sixth inaugural team as the Fraser Valley Bandits, the logo representing a red fox wearing a bandit mask.

The team began play in the 2019 CEBL season at Abbotsford Centre. On June 27, 2019, the Bandits defeated the Saskatchewan Rattlers for their first win in franchise history. In their inaugural campaign, the Bandits finished 4-16 and did not qualify for the playoffs.

In the 2020 season, the Bandits finished the regular season 4-2 and advanced to the CEBL championship game. They ultimately fell to the Edmonton Stingers in the final 90-73.

In the 2021 season, the Bandits went 7-7 and earned a playoff berth. After defeating the Guelph Nighthawks in the quarterfinals, the Bandits lost in the semifinals to the Niagara River Lions 84-82.

On September 23, 2021, the Bandits announced that Langley Events Centre will be their home for the upcoming CEBL season, which began May 2022.

== Players ==
=== Current roster ===
Note: Flags indicate national team eligibility at FIBA-sanctioned events. Players may hold other non-FIBA nationalities not displayed.

Vancouver Bandits roster
Players
Coaches

| Pos. | No. | Nat. | Name | Ht. | Wt. | Age |
|---|---|---|---|---|---|---|
| G | 0 | (United States) | Knight III, John | 6 ft 3 in (1.91 m) | 205 lb (93 kg) | 27 – 12 May 1999 |
| G | 1 | (United States) | Joiner, Jarkel | 6 ft 1 in (1.85 m) | 181 lb (82 kg) | 27 – 20 May 1999 |
| G | 2 | (United States) | Copeland, Zach | 6 ft 4 in (1.93 m) | 185 lb (84 kg) | 29 – 21 June 1997 |
| G | 3 | (Canada) | Givance, Shamar | 5 ft 11 in (1.80 m) | 155 lb (70 kg) | 27 – 10 August 1999 |
| F | 4 | (Canada) | Gum, Majok | 6 ft 9 in (2.06 m) | 200 lb (91 kg) | 26 – 24 January 2000 |
| F | 5 | (Canada) | Samuel, Tyrese | 6 ft 10 in (2.08 m) | 239 lb (108 kg) | 26 – 10 March 2000 |
| G | 6 | (Rwanda) | Mutabazi, David | 6 ft 5 in (1.96 m) | 205 lb (93 kg) | 24 – 20 January 2002 |
| F | 7 | (United States) | Eddie, Jarell | 6 ft 7 in (2.01 m) | 220 lb (100 kg) | 35 – 30 October 1991 |
| F | 9 | (Canada) | Parolin, Dominic | 6 ft 9 in (2.06 m) | 245 lb (111 kg) | 23 – 14 December 2002 |
| G | 10 | (Canada) | Notice, Duane | 6 ft 3 in (1.91 m) | 218 lb (99 kg) | 32 – 7 September 1994 |
| G | 11 | (Canada) | Mulder, Mychal | 6 ft 3 in (1.91 m) | 184 lb (83 kg) | 32 – 12 June 1994 |
| F | 12 | (United States) | Kopp, Miller | 6 ft 7 in (2.01 m) | 220 lb (100 kg) | 27 – 24 November 1998 |
| G | 13 | (United States) | Brown, Tevin | 6 ft 5 in (1.96 m) | 175 lb (79 kg) | 28 – 23 September 1998 |
| G | 14 | (Canada) | Pandi, Lloyd | 6 ft 4 in (1.93 m) | 191 lb (87 kg) | 26 – 10 December 1999 |
| F | 15 | (Czech Republic) | Karnik, James | 6 ft 9 in (2.06 m) | 250 lb (110 kg) | 27 – 17 July 1999 |
| F | 18 | (Canada) | Bain, Ashton (U) | 6 ft 8 in (2.03 m) | 203 lb (92 kg) | 20 – 5 February 2006 |
| F | 27 | (Canada) | Smid, Shadynn (U) | 6 ft 7 in (2.01 m) | 205 lb (93 kg) | 22 – 29 September 2004 |
| C | 34 | (United States) | Zimmerman, Stephen | 7 ft 0 in (2.13 m) | 240 lb (110 kg) | 30 – 9 September 1996 |
| G | 41 | (United States) | Davis, Dre | 6 ft 6 in (1.98 m) | 210 lb (95 kg) | 25 – 23 August 2001 |
| F | 44 | (Canada) | Shephard, Grant | 6 ft 10 in (2.08 m) | 224 lb (102 kg) | 27 – 7 April 1999 |
| G | 55 | (Australia) | Creek, Mitch | 6 ft 5 in (1.96 m) | 224 lb (102 kg) | 34 – 27 April 1992 |

Head coach

- (Canada) Kyle Julius

Assistant coach(es)

- (Canada) Ransford Brempong
- (Canada) Matthew Barg
- (Canada) Tony Scott
- (Canada) Louie Al-Hafidh

Legend

- (C) Team captain
- (I) Inactive
- (U) Current U Sports Athlete
- Injured

- Roster
- Transactions
Updated: September 15, 2026

=== Notable players ===
Note: Flags indicate national team eligibility at FIBA-sanctioned events. Players may hold other non-FIBA nationalities not displayed.

Criteria

To appear in this section a player must have either:

- Set a club record or won an individual award while at the club
- Played at least one official international match for their national team at any time
- Played at least one official NBA match at any time.

- (Australia) Kyle Adnam
- (Canada) Olu Ashaolu
- (Canada) Ransford Brempong
- (United States) Izaiah Brockington
- (Canada) Junior Cadougan
- (Canada) Marcus Carr
- (Australia) Mitch Creek
- (United States) Jarell Eddie
- (United States) Shane Gibson
- (Chinese Taipei) Brandon Gilbeck
- (Canada) Kadre Gray
- (Syria) Doug Herring Jr.
- (United States) Jaelen House
- (United States) Jarkel Joiner
- (Czech Republic) James Karnik
- (Canada) Levon Kendall
- (Canada) Marek Klassen
- (United States) Miller Kopp
- (Canada) MiKyle McIntosh
- (United States) Tazé Moore
- (Canada) Mychal Mulder
- (Rwanda) David Mutabazi
- (Jamaica) Jabs Newby
- (Canada) Duane Notice
- (Canada) Lloyd Pandi
- (Canada) Tyrese Samuel
- (Canada) Grant Shephard
- (United States) M. J. Walker
- (Hong Kong) Glen Yang
- (United States) Stephen Zimmerman

== Honours ==
- CEBL

Regular season top team (2): 2024, 2025

Regular Season Western Conference Winners (3): 2024, 2025, 2026

Western Conference Champions (1): 2024

== Season-by-season record ==
| League | Season | Coach | Regular season | | | | Postseason | | | |
| League | Season | Coach | Won | Lost | Win % | Finish | Won | Lost | Win % | Result |
|---|---|---|---|---|---|---|---|---|---|---|
CEBL
| CEBL | 2019 | Peter Guarasci | 4 | 16 | .200 | 6th | did not qualify | | | |
| CEBL | 2020 | Kyle Julius | 4 | 2 | .667 | 2nd | 1 | 1 | .500 | Lost finals |
| CEBL | 2021 | Dave Singleton | 7 | 7 | .500 | 4th | 1 | 1 | .500 | Lost semi-finals |
| CEBL | 2022 | Mike Taylor | 12 | 8 | .600 | 4th | 0 | 1 | .000 | Lost play in round |
| CEBL | 2023 | Kyle Julius | 8 | 12 | .400 | 4th West | 0 | 1 | .000 | Lost Semi-finals |
| CEBL | 2024 | Kyle Julius | 14 | 6 | .700 | 1st West | 1 | 1 | .500 | Lost finals |
| CEBL | 2025 | Kyle Julius | 19 | 5 | .792 | 1st West | 0 | 1 | .000 | lost Quarter-finals |
| CEBL | 2026 | Kyle Julius | 15 | 9 | .625 | 1st West | 1 | 1 | .500 | lost semi-finals |
| Totals | | | 83 | 65 | .561 | — | 4 | 7 | .364 | |
