= Marine Drive (Greater Vancouver) =

Name for three major roadways in Greater Vancouver, British Columbia, Canada

- Marine Way
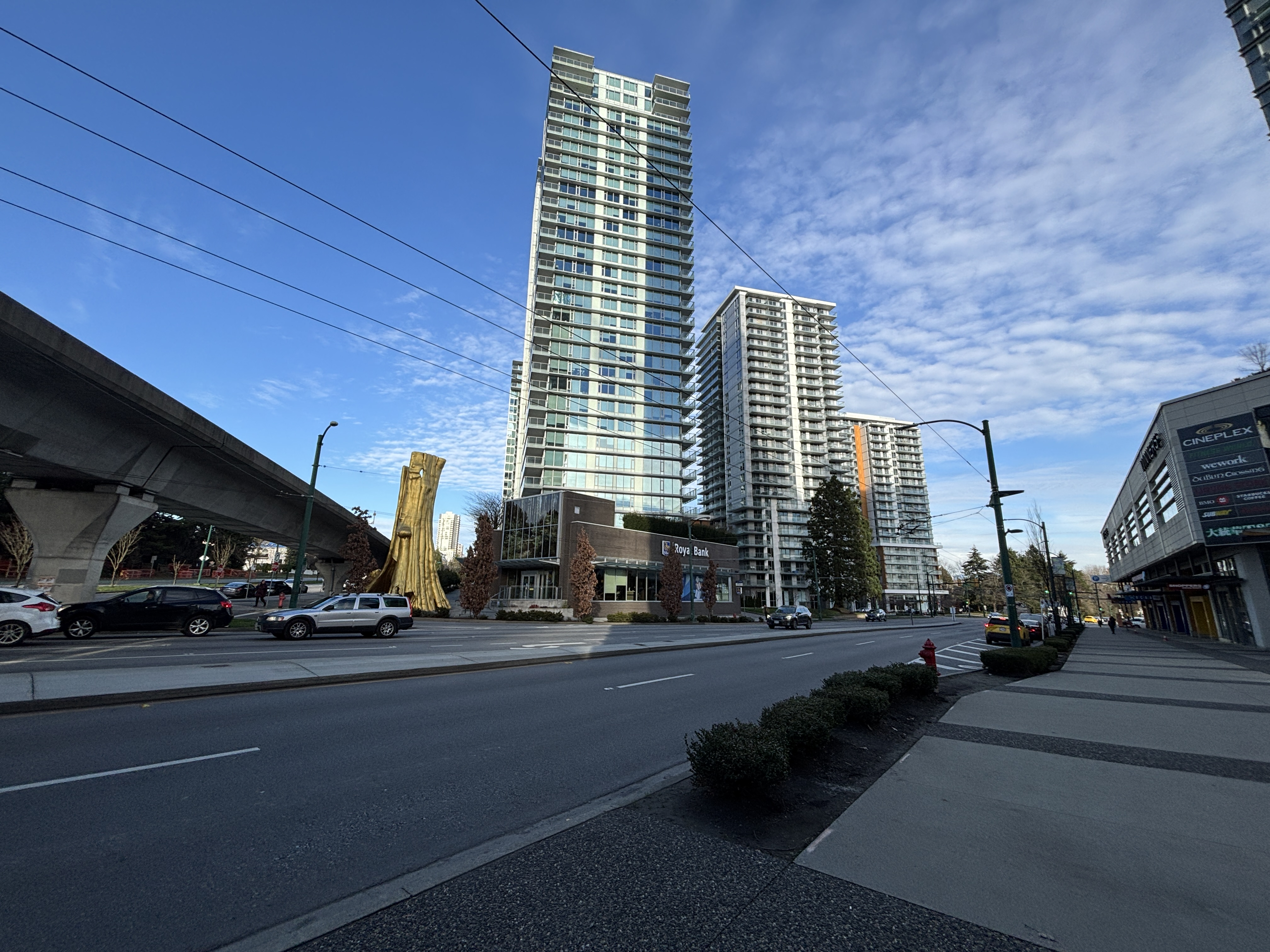
- Marine Drive near MC2 South Tower & W1 Condominiums
- Burrard Peninsula Section
- Length: 32.6 km (20.3 mi)
- Location: Vancouver, Burnaby, New Westminster, University Endowment Lands
- West end: West 4th Avenue
- Major junctions: Granville Street; Grant McConachie Way; Oak Street; Cambie Street; Main Street; Knight Street; Boundary Road
- East end: Highway 91A / Stewardson Way
- North Shore Section
- Length: 21.1 km (13.1 mi)
- West end: Cliff Road / Rockland Wynd
- Major junctions: Highway 1 (TCH); Taylor Way (Highway 99 north); Highway 99 south
- East end: Bewicke Avenue / Keith Road / 3rd Street
- White Rock/South Surrey Section
- Length: 6.7 km (4.2 mi)
- West end: 128 Street
- East end: Stayte Road (160 Street) / 8 Avenue

Marine Drive is the name for three major roadways in Greater Vancouver, British Columbia, Canada. The roads are known for running parallel to major bodies of water, with some sections being a major arterial road, while other serve local traffic. Marine Way is the name applied to a section of Marine Drive that was bypassed in the early 1980s.

== Burrard Peninsula ==
The Burrard Peninsula section of Marine Drive passes through the University Endowment Lands as well as the Cities of Vancouver, Burnaby, and New Westminster, following the Burrard Inlet, Strait of Georgia, and the North Arm of Fraser River around Point Grey. In Vancouver, Marine Drive is prefixed by a quadrant and is divided into Northwest, Southwest, and Southeast sections; while in Burnaby and New Westminster it is simply known as Marine Drive. The northeastern and southeastern extremes of Marine Drive are relatively minor roadways; however, when the remainder is combined with 70th Avenue and Marine Way, it forms a 27-kilometre-long (17 mi) thoroughfare from the University of British Columbia to New Westminster and is one of the most important routes in the region. The section located within the University Endowment Lands is provincially maintained and internally referred as Pseudo Highway 914:0620, which is unsigned, while southern section of Marine Drive / Marine Way along the North Arm of the Fraser River is part of TransLink's Major Road Network.

=== Route description ===
Northwest Marine Drive begins at West 4th Avenue in the Vancouver neighbourhood of West Point Grey. It travels as a collector road north to Jericho Beach and turns west, following the south shore of Burrard Inlet and passing Locarno Beach and Spanish Banks. It leaves Vancouver and enters the University Endowment Lands, passing through Pacific Spirit Regional Park. The collector road ends at Chancellor Boulevard (the western extension of West 4th Avenue).

Northwest Marine Drive continues as a western continuation of Chancellor Boulevard along the perimeter of the Point Grey Campus of the University of British Columbia. At the western edge of Point Grey near Wreck Beach, the roadway turns south and becomes Southwest Marine Drive near the Totem Park student residences. It passes the UBC Botanical Garden and starts to head in a south-southeasterly direction. It becomes an arterial road as it leaves the UBC Campus and heads east through Pacific Spirit Regional Park and Shaughnessy Golf and Country Club, re-entering Vancouver in the Dunbar–Southlands neighbourhood, following the North Arm of Fraser River, but located a number of blocks away from the water. It passes through Kerrisdale and Marpole before turning due east along the 70th Avenue alignment just past Angus Drive. One block west of Granville Street, Southwest Marine Drive follows a short residential street and heads south and east, while the main roadway becomes West 70th Avenue, providing access to both Granville and Oak Streets.

When the residential section intersects Granville Street, Granville Street itself turns southeast and becomes Southwest Marine Drive. It reaches a Y-interchange at the north end of the Arthur Laing Bridge where traffic can access the Vancouver International Airport via Grant McConachie Way. Southwest Marine Drive turns in a northeasterly direction, passing underneath the Oak Street Bridge, again crossing West 70th Avenue, and passes Marine Gateway at Cambie Street. At Ontario Street, the roadway becomes Southeast Marine Drive and continues east into the Sunset neighbourhood. It passes through a partial cloverleaf at Knight Street at the north end of the Knight Street Bridge, and continues east through Victoria–Fraserview and Killarney. Just east of Kerr Street near Everett Crowley Park, the main roadway becomes Marine Way and continues east through Burnaby and New Westminster to the Queensborough Interchange, which provides access to the Queensborough Bridge and Highway 91A. East of the interchange, the roadway is known as Stewardson Way and continues along the waterfront into downtown New Westminster.

At the same time, Southeast Marine Drive runs parallel to Marine Way as a collector road through Champlain Heights. As it passes over Boundary Road, it enters Burnaby and simply goes by Marine Drive, separating the South Slope and Big Bend neighbourhoods with the roadway ending at a T-intersection at Southridge Drive. Marine Drive resumes as a residential street just east of the intersection as a right-in/right out from Southridge Drive and passes through the southwestern portion of the Edmonds before crossing into New Westminster and terminating at a dead end just east of 7th Avenue.

=== History ===
Marine Drive used to continue east in New Westminster, passing through the Queensborough Interchange before continuing as Stewardson Way. Marine Way was constructed in the early 1980s to divert traffic from the eastern sections, and access to the interchange was cut off and traffic was diverted to the new roadway.

=== Major intersections ===
==== Main section ====
Location	km	mi	Destinations	Notes
Vancouver	0.0	0.0	West 4th Avenue	As Northwest Marine Drive
Vancouver	2.3	1.4	Vancouver city limits	North end of unsigned Highway 901:0620 concurrency
University Endowment Lands	2.3– 3.9	1.4– 2.4	Passes through Pacific Spirit Park	
University of British Columbia (Point Grey Campus)	5.0	3.1	Chancellor Boulevard (Highway 901:0602 east) / East Mall	Northwest Marine Drive branches west; eastbound through traffic follows Chancellor Boulevard
University of British Columbia (Point Grey Campus)	7.0	4.3	Becomes Southwest Marine Drive	
University of British Columbia (Point Grey Campus)	7.8	4.8	West 16th Avenue (Highway 901:0640 east)	
University Endowment Lands	9.7– 11.9	6.0– 7.4	Passes through Pacific Spirit Park	
Vancouver	12.0	7.5	West 41st Avenue	South end of unsigned Highway 901:0620 concurrency
Vancouver	12.9	8.0	Dunbar Street	
Vancouver	17.3	10.7	West 70th Avenue / Cornish Street	SW Marine Drive branches south as a residential street; eastbound through traffic follows 70th Avenue; westbound access to Highway 99
Vancouver	17.7	11.0	Granville Street	Southwest Marine Drive branches southeast; northbound through traffic follows Granville Street; resumes as an arterial road
Vancouver	18.2	11.3	Grant McConachie Way (to Arthur Laing Bridge) – Vancouver International Airport	Interchange; Southwest Marine Drive turns northeast
Vancouver	17.7	11.0	Oak Street (Highway 99)	Partially grade separated; no access to the Oak Street Bridge; missing access via West 70th Avenue
Vancouver	19.4	12.1	West 70th Avenue to Highway 99 south – BC Ferries (Tsawwassen), Seattle	No eastbound Marine Drive to westbound 70th Avenue access; eastbound access to Highway 99
Vancouver	19.7	12.2	Cambie Street	Marine Drive station
Vancouver	20.6	12.8	Ontario Street	Becomes Southeast Marine Drive
Vancouver	20.9	13.0	Main Street	
Vancouver	21.7	13.5	Fraser Street	
Vancouver	22.7	14.1	Knight Street to Highway 99 south – Richmond, Vancouver International Airport	Interchange
Vancouver	23.6	14.7	Victoria Drive	
Vancouver	25.6	15.9	Southeast Marine Drive	Becomes Marine Way
Vancouver–Burnaby boundary	26.8	16.7	Boundary Road	
Burnaby	27.8	17.3	Glenlyon Parkway	
Burnaby	28.5	17.7	Nelson Avenue	
Burnaby	29.9	18.6	Byrne Road (to Southridge Drive)	
Burnaby	31.1	19.3	North Fraser Way	
New Westminster	32.6 0.0	20.3 0.0	Highway 91A south – Richmond, Delta	Queensborough Interchange; becomes Stewardson Way
New Westminster	2.3	1.4	12th Street (to Kingsway)	
New Westminster	2.4	1.5	Royal Avenue – Coquitlam, Surrey Columbia Street – Downtown, Quay/Waterfront	Continues as Columbia Street
1.000 mi = 1.609 km; 1.000 km = 0.621 mi: Concurrency terminus; Incomplete access; Route transition

==== Eastern section ====
Eastern portion of Marine Drive now bypassed by Marine Way.

Location	km	mi	Destinations	Notes
Vancouver	0.0	0.0	Marine Way / Southeast Marine Drive	T-intersection; Southeast Marine Drive continues west
Vancouver–Burnaby boundary	1.1	0.68	Boundary Road	Grade separated (no access); becomes Marine Drive
Burnaby	4.7	2.9	Southridge Drive / Byrne Road	Full access west of intersection; right-in/right-out east of intersection
New Westminster	6.5	4.0	7th Avenue	
New Westminster	6.6	4.1	dead end	
1.000 mi = 1.609 km; 1.000 km = 0.621 mi: Incomplete access

==== West 70th Avenue ====
Southwest Marine Drive becomes West 70th Avenue in the Marpole neighbourhood of Vancouver. The entire route is in Vancouver.

km	mi	Destinations	Notes
0.0	0.0	Southwest Marine Drive / Cornish Street	Continues west as Marine Drive
0.1	0.062	Granville Street (Highway 99 north)	Official west end of Highway 99 concurrency
0.9	0.56	Oak Street (Highway 99 south) – Tsawwassen ferry terminal, USA Border	Official east end of Highway 99 concurrency; BC Ferries to Victoria and Nanaimo
1.5	0.93	Southwest Marine Drive	No eastbound Marine Drive to westbound 70th Avenue access; 70th Avenue continues as a residential street
1.000 mi = 1.609 km; 1.000 km = 0.621 mi: Incomplete access

== North Shore ==
The North Shore section of Marine Drive is an arterial road that passes through the District of West Vancouver, as well as both the District and City of North Vancouver, following the north shore of Burrard Inlet. Prior to the opening of the Upper Levels Highway in 1957, Marine Drive carried Highway 99 between the Lions Gate Bridge and Horseshoe Bay. Marine Drive east of 21st Street is part of TransLink's Major Road Network.

=== Route description ===
Marine Drive begins as a residential street in Whytecliff Park in West Vancouver and snakes around Batchelor Cove as well as the residential areas of Horseshoe Bay. Marine Drive passes an interchange with Highway 1 near the entrance to the Horseshoe Bay ferry terminal; this was formerly the site of the southern terminus of the Sea to Sky Highway prior to it being realigned in the early 2000s with the bypassed roadway now named Horseshoe Bay Drive. Marine Drive continues south and east along the mouth of Howe Sound to Lighthouse Park, where it turns east and follows Burrard Inlet. It continues for several kilometers along the shore until it becomes more commercial as it passes through the neighbourhoods of Ambleside and Dundarave, both of which form West Vancouver's main commercial district. Near Park Royal Shopping Centre, it intersects Taylor Way where Highway 99 briefly joins Marine Drive. After crossing the Capilano River, Highway 99 leaves Marine Drive at the base of the Lions Gate Bridge and heads towards Stanley Park and Downtown Vancouver.

Just east of the Lions Gate Bridge approach, Marine Drive passes through the District of North Vancouver for several blocks. It crosses Mackay Road where it enters the City of North Vancouver. It passes Capilano Mall and turns southeast where it reaches its terminus at the five-way intersection with Berwicke Avenue, Keith Road, and 3rd Street. Both Keith Road (due east) and 3rd Street (southeast) function as the eastern extension of Marine Drive and link to Lower Lonsdale, North Vancouver's main business district.

=== Major intersections ===
Location	km	mi	Destinations	Notes
West Vancouver	0.0	0.0	Cliff Road / Rockland Wynd	
West Vancouver	2.0	1.2	Nelson Avenue / Rosebery Avenue	Roundabout; access to Horseshoe Bay village and passenger ferry dropoff
West Vancouver	2.3	1.4	Highway 1 (TCH) east to Highway 99 / Horseshoe Bay Drive (Highway 901:2924 north / Highway 901:0513 south) – Vancouver, Whistler	Horseshoe Bay Interchange; Highway 1 exit 0; no direct access to Highway 1 west and ferry terminal
West Vancouver	15.3	9.5	21st Street	
West Vancouver	17.8	11.1	Taylor Way (Highway 99 north) – Horseshoe Bay ferry terminal, Whistler	West end of Highway 99 concurrency; near Park Royal Shopping Centre
West Vancouver	18.0	11.2	Crosses the Capilano River	
West Vancouver	18.2	11.3	Highway 99 south (Lions Gate Bridge) – Vancouver, Vancouver International Airport	Interchange; east end of Highway 99 concurrency
North Vancouver (District)	18.7	11.6	Capilano Road to Highway 1 (TCH)	
North Vancouver District–City boundary	20.2	12.6	MacKay Road	
North Vancouver (City)	20.4	12.7	West 16th Street / Hamilton Avenue	Near Capilano Mall
North Vancouver (City)	21.1	13.1	Berwicke Avenue / West Keith Road / West 3rd Street	
1.000 mi = 1.609 km; 1.000 km = 0.621 mi: Concurrency terminus; Incomplete access

== White Rock/South Surrey ==
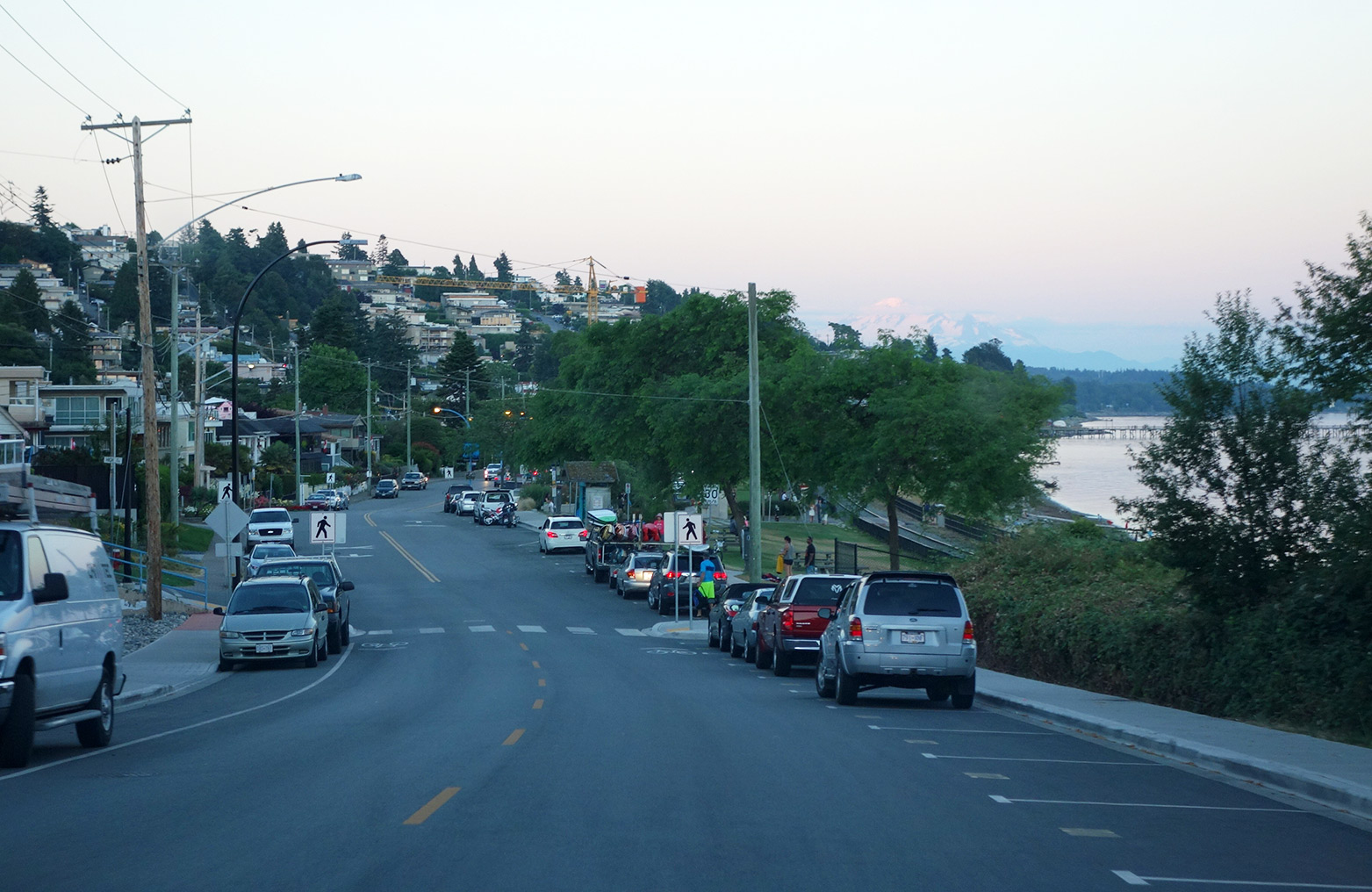
Marine Drive in White Rock near West Beach

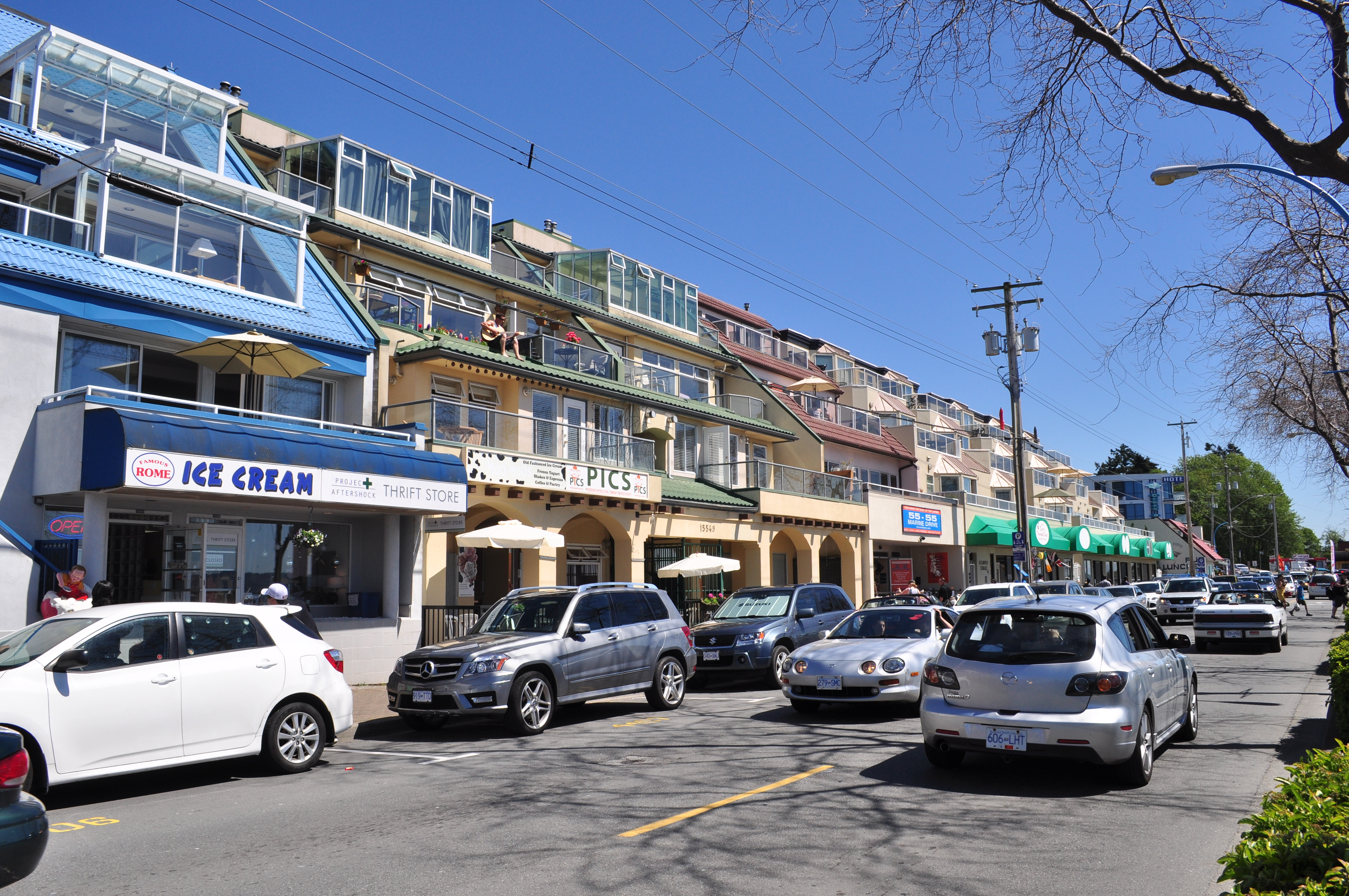
Marine Drive in White Rock near East Beach

The White Rock/South Surrey section of Marine Drive is a collector road that passes through the Cities of Surrey and White Rock, following Semiahmoo Bay.

=== Route description ===
Marine Drive begins in the South Surrey neighbourhood of Ocean Park at 128th Street. It travels east and crosses into White Rock at Bergstrom Road (136th Street) and follows the waterfront; the two are separated by the BNSF Railway. Beginning at Bayview Park (near Bay Street), the White Rock Promenade runs parallel to Marine Drive (south of the railway) for 2.19 km (1.36 mi), running the entire length of the beach and connecting to the White Rock Pier. It passes through White Rock's historic commercial area and continues east, where it crosses back into Surrey at Stayte Road (160th Street) and continues east as 8th Avenue along the northern boundary of the Semiahmoo Indian Reserve.

8th Avenue intersects both Highway 99 and Highway 15. Due to its proximity to the Canada–United States border, it serves as the main connector route between Peace Arch and Pacific Highway Border Crossings, with the section provincially maintained and internally known as Unsigned Highway 901:3188. 8th Avenue continues east as a rural road towards the Township of Langley and Campbell Valley Regional Park.

=== Major intersections ===
Location	km	mi	Destinations	Notes
Surrey	0.0	0.0	128th Street	
Surrey–White Rock boundary	1.6	0.99	Bergstrom Road (136th Street)	
White Rock	4.1	2.5	Oxford Street	
White Rock–Surrey boundary	6.7 0.0	4.2 0.0	Stayte Road (160th Street)	Becomes 8th Avenue
Surrey	1.4	0.87	Highway 99 to I-5 / King George Boulevard (former Highway 99A north) – Vancouver, Peace Arch Border Crossing	Interchange; Highway 99 exit 2; west end of unsigned Highway 901:3188 concurrency
Surrey	3.2	2.0	Highway 15 (176 Street) to Highway 1 (TCH) / SR 543 – Hope, Pacific Highway Border Crossing	East end of unsigned Highway 901:3188 concurrency; 8th Avenue continues east
1.000 mi = 1.609 km; 1.000 km = 0.621 mi: Concurrency terminus; Route transition
