= Everett Crowley Park =

Public park in Vancouver, Canada

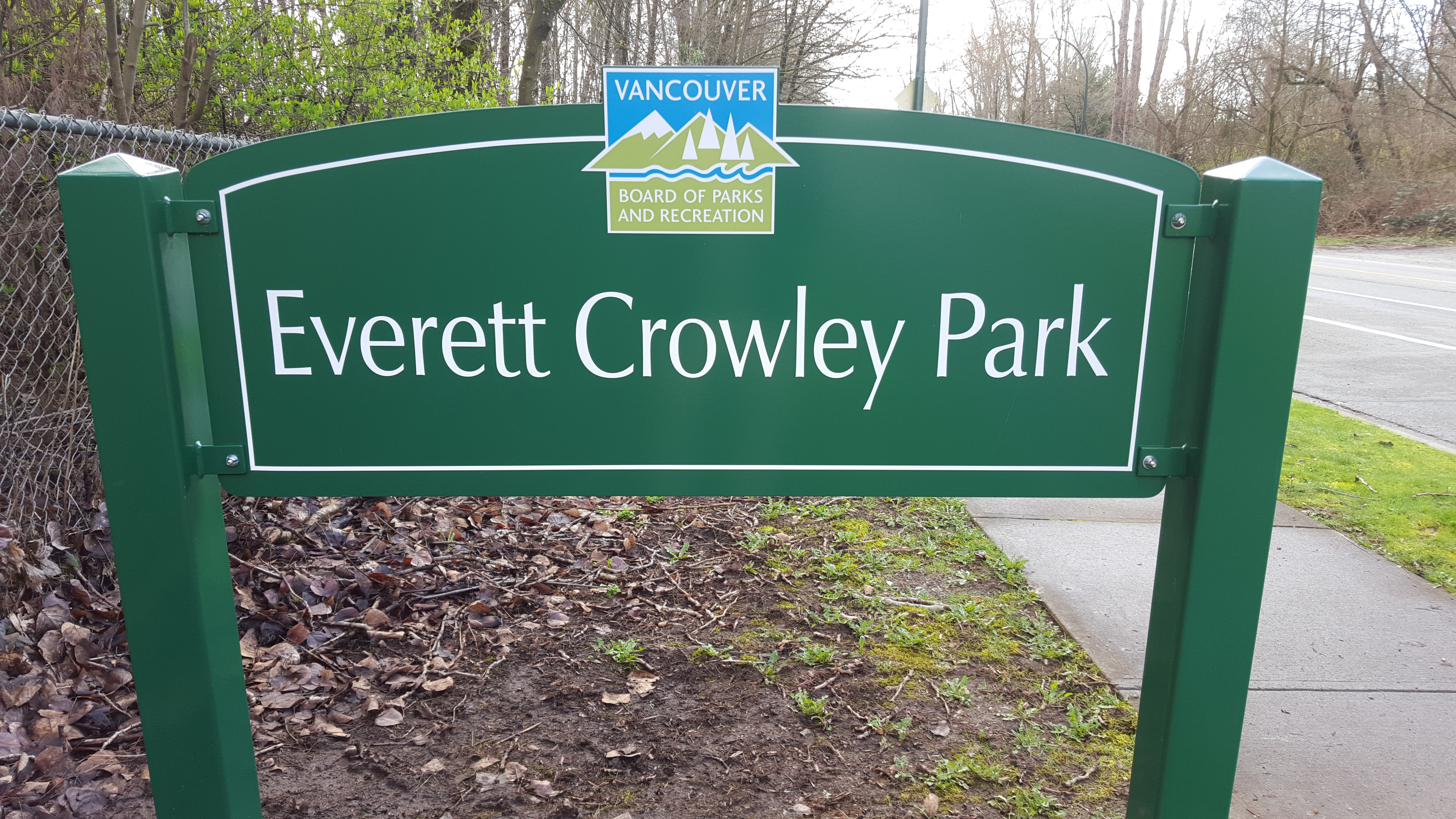
- Interactive map of Everett Crowley Park
- Location: Vancouver, British Columbia
- Coordinates: 49°12′39″N 123°02′10″W
- Area: 100 acres (40 ha)
- Designation: Municipal Park
- Website: www.vcn.bc.ca/ecpc/

Everett Crowley Park is a 38-hectare large forested park with trails, located within the Champlain Heights area of Vancouver. The park was previously a landfill, but was allowed to become reforested for recreational purposes. Currently, it is Vancouver's 5th largest public park. The surrounding neighbourhood was the last area to be developed in Vancouver in the 1970s. The park is maintained, developed, and protected by the Vancouver Park Board and stewarded by a committee of the Champlain Heights Community Association, the Everett Crowley Park Committee (ECPC). The park is a 3-minute walk north of Vancouver's developing River District, on the edge of the Fraser River.

== History ==
Prior to being a park, the area was known to be the Kerr Street garbage dump. The Kerr Street garbage dump served as Vancouver's main landfill from 1944 to 1967. The dump was closed in 1966, and the deposited waste was up to 49 metres in places.

The area was closed for 20 years until being re-introduced as Everett Crowley Park in 1987. Dedication and opening of the park was promoted through petitioning and lobbying by local residents. Eventually, the garbage dump was reforested by local and invasive species. Since 2010, large areas of Himalayan blackberry have been removed and replaced with several thousand trees planted by the park board.

=== Everett Crowley ===
The park is named after Everett Crowley, who was the owner of Avalon Dairy, Vancouver's last independent dairy. Everett Crowley served as a park board commissioner from 1961 to 1966. He was born on June 3, 1909 and lived to the age of 75.

== Ecology ==
Park Ecology
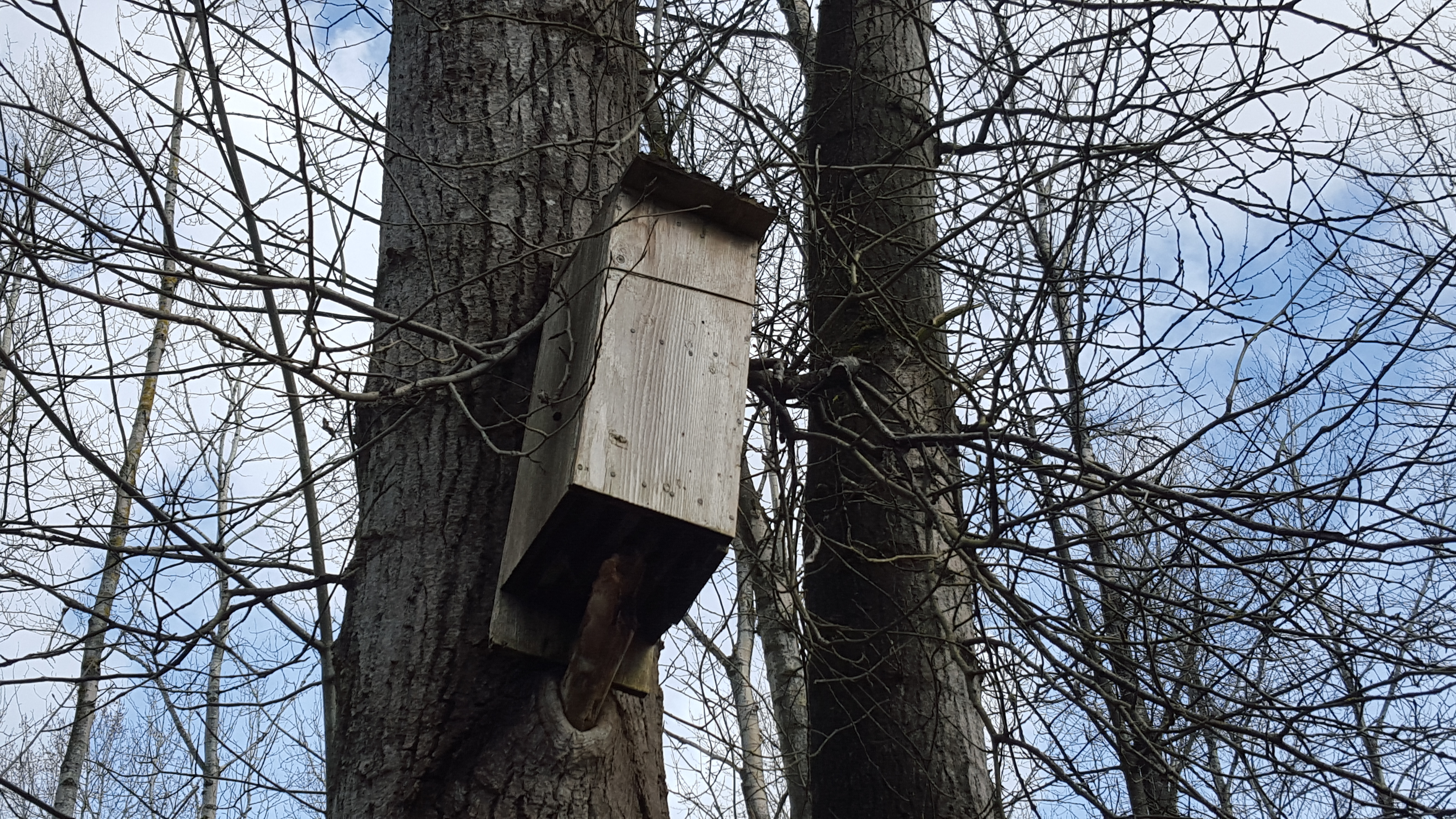
Birdhouse in Vancouver's Everett Crowley Park

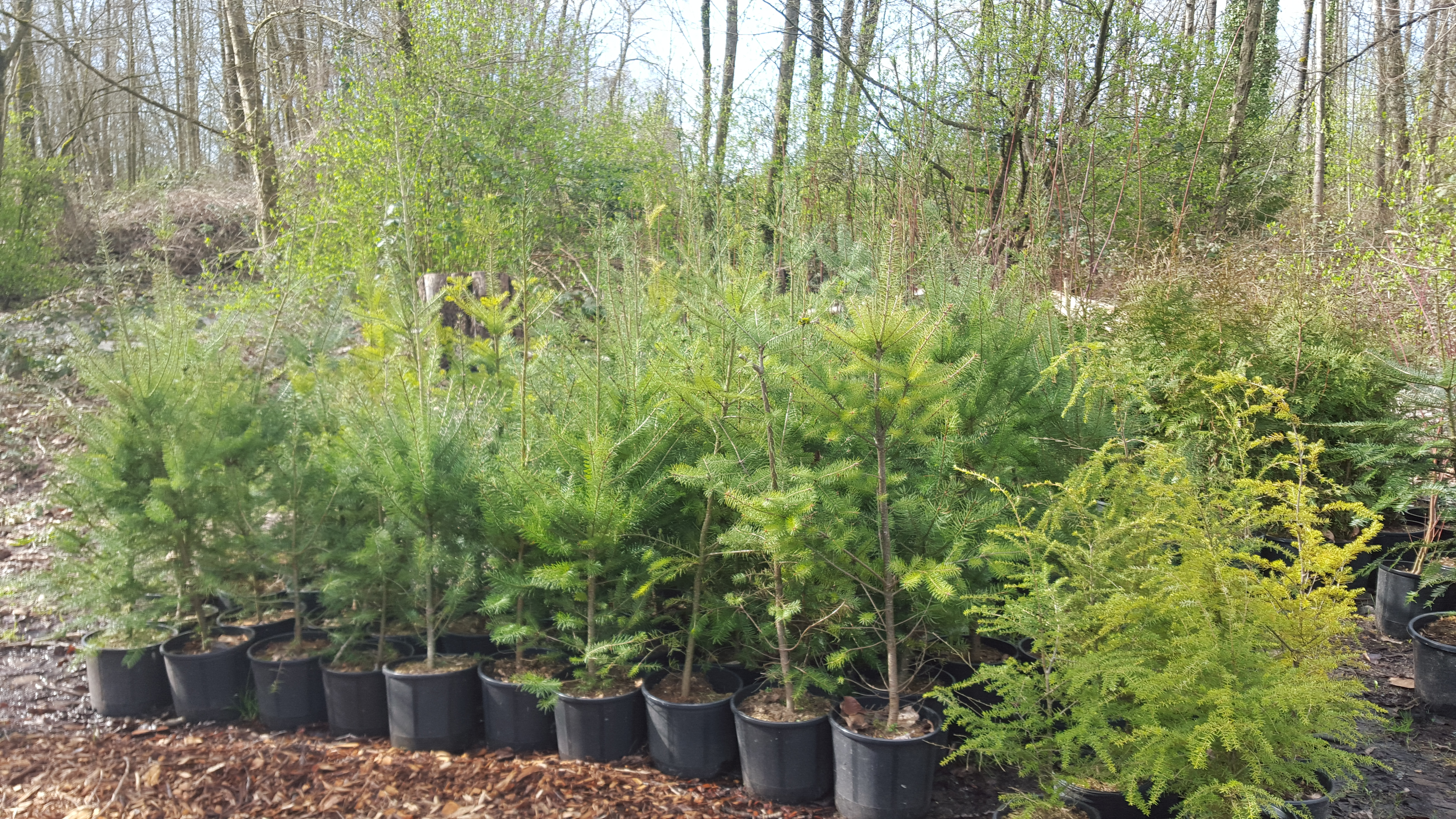
Spruce Trees in Everett Crowley Park to be planted

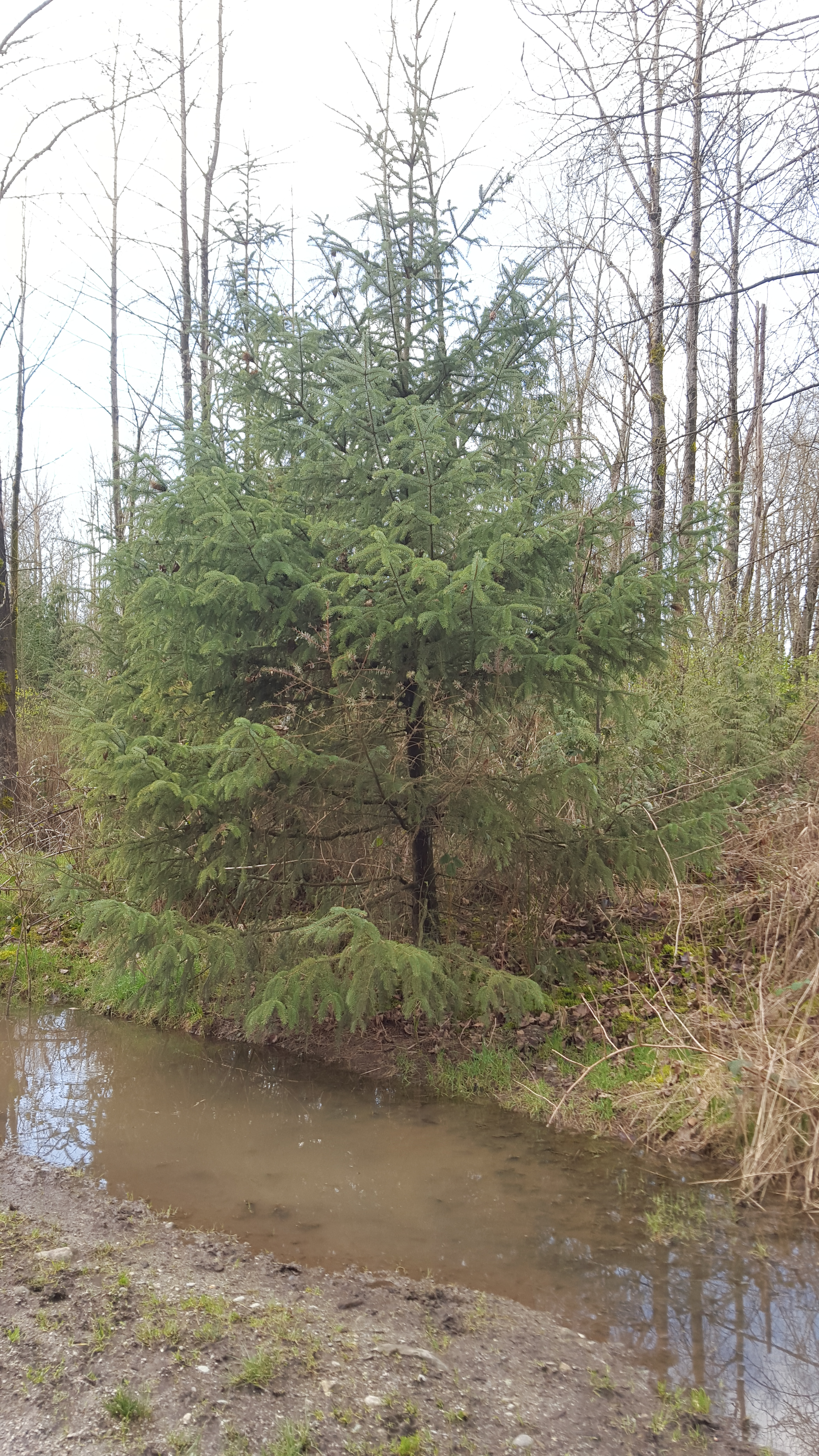
Spruce tree that was planted in the park for rehabilitation efforts.

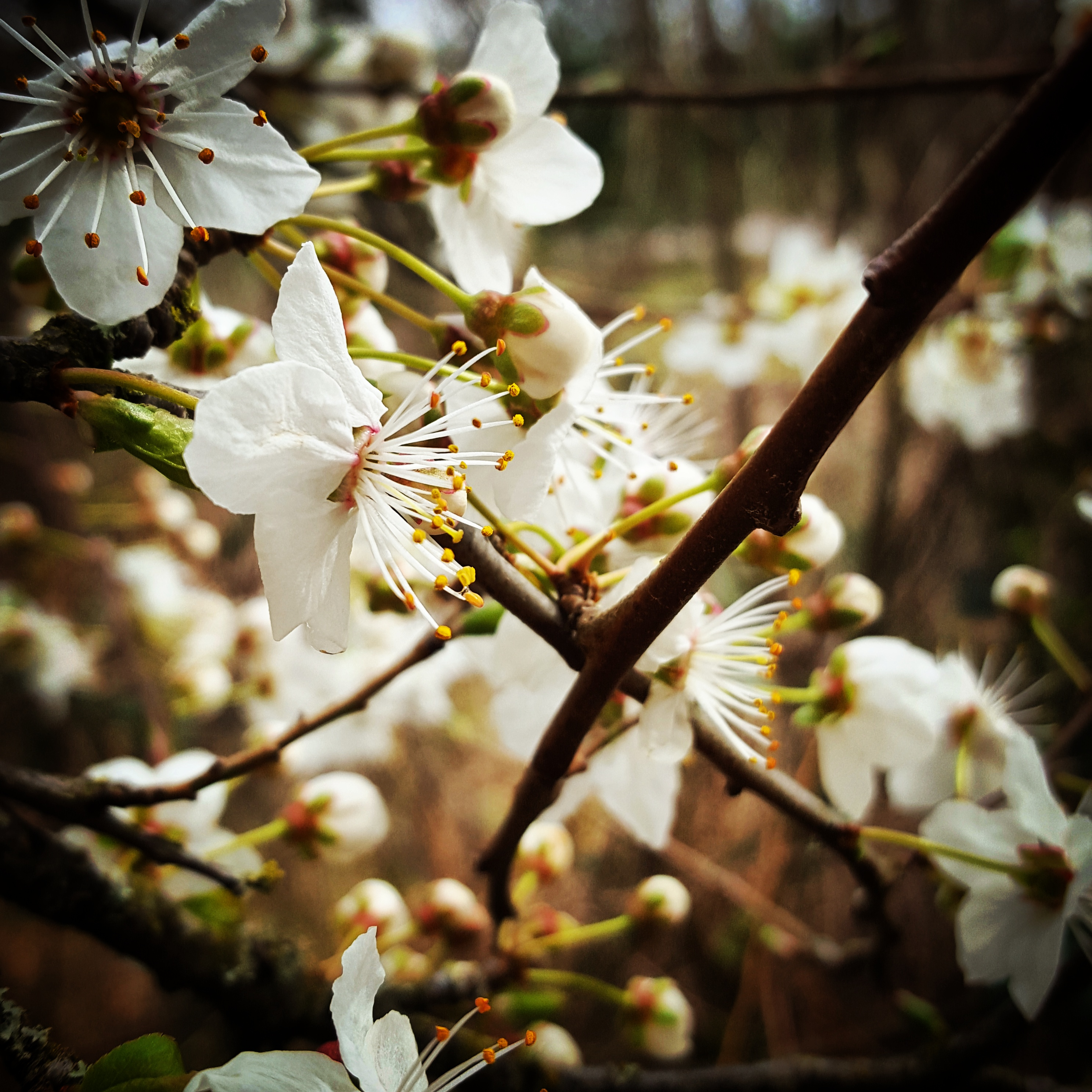
Cherry Blossoms are also present in the park.

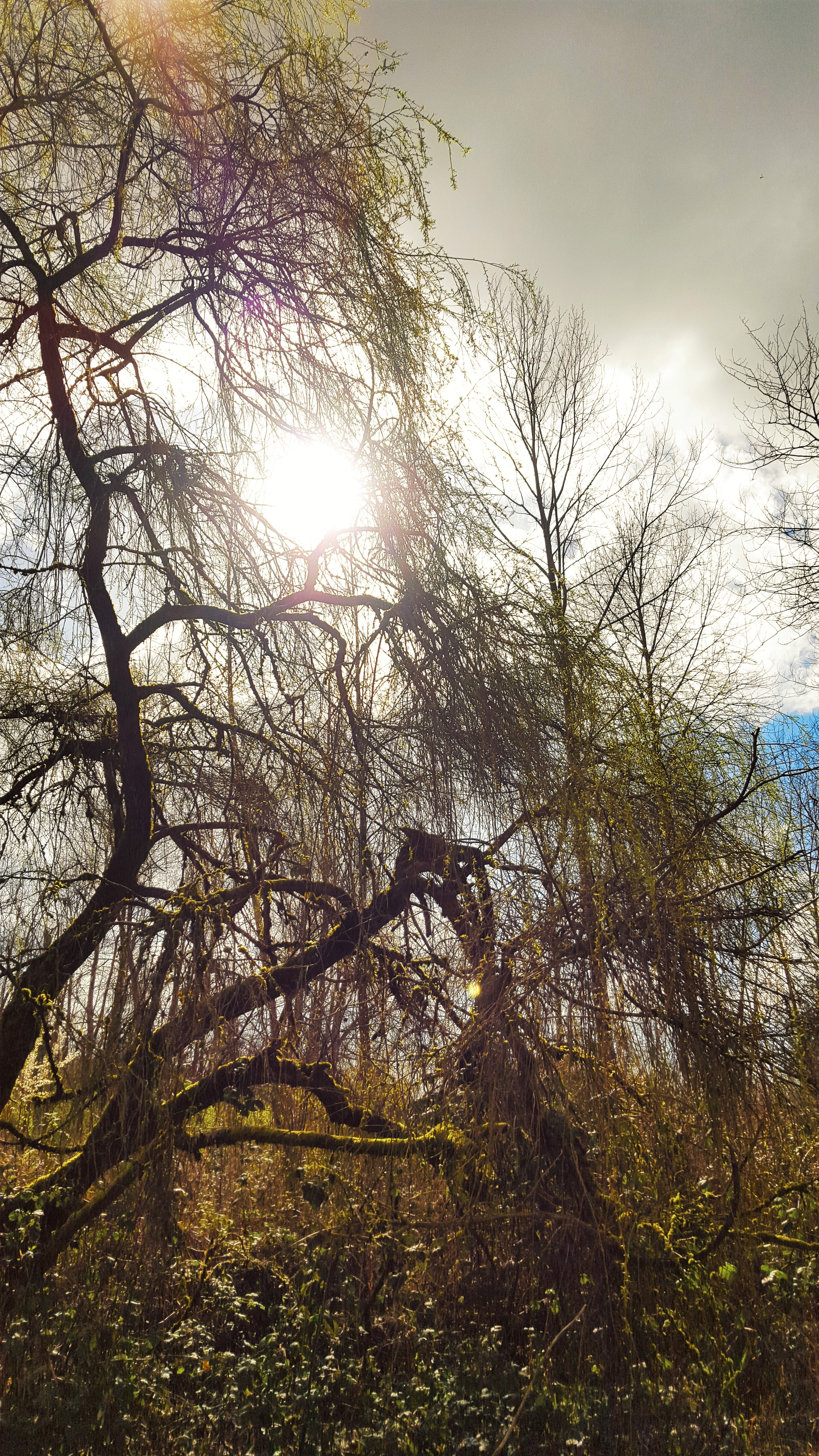
Weeping willow trees in the sunlight.

Everett Crowley Park is in transition. Since the early 1970s, native and invasive plants and animals have been slowly recolonizing the park, transforming it into a young forest of hardy deciduous trees, wildflowers, and opportunistic blackberry. The area is recovering, and the result is a botanically diverse landscape frequented by birds and other wildlife, who find refuge in this urban wilderness.

Before to usage as a garbage dump in 1944, the area was a heavy dense coniferous forest. Trees native to this area were mostly hemlock and cedar trees. In addition, salmon were present in a creek that ran through a ravine. After its closure as a landfill, local plants such as cottonwoods and maple trees began moving back into the area. Invasive species, such as blackberry shrubs, have taken residence in the park, and are a very common sight.

According to a bird expert, over 200 different species of birds have been spotted in the park. These include Steller's jays, black-capped chickadees, and the American robin. The park is also a landing spot for migrant songbirds.

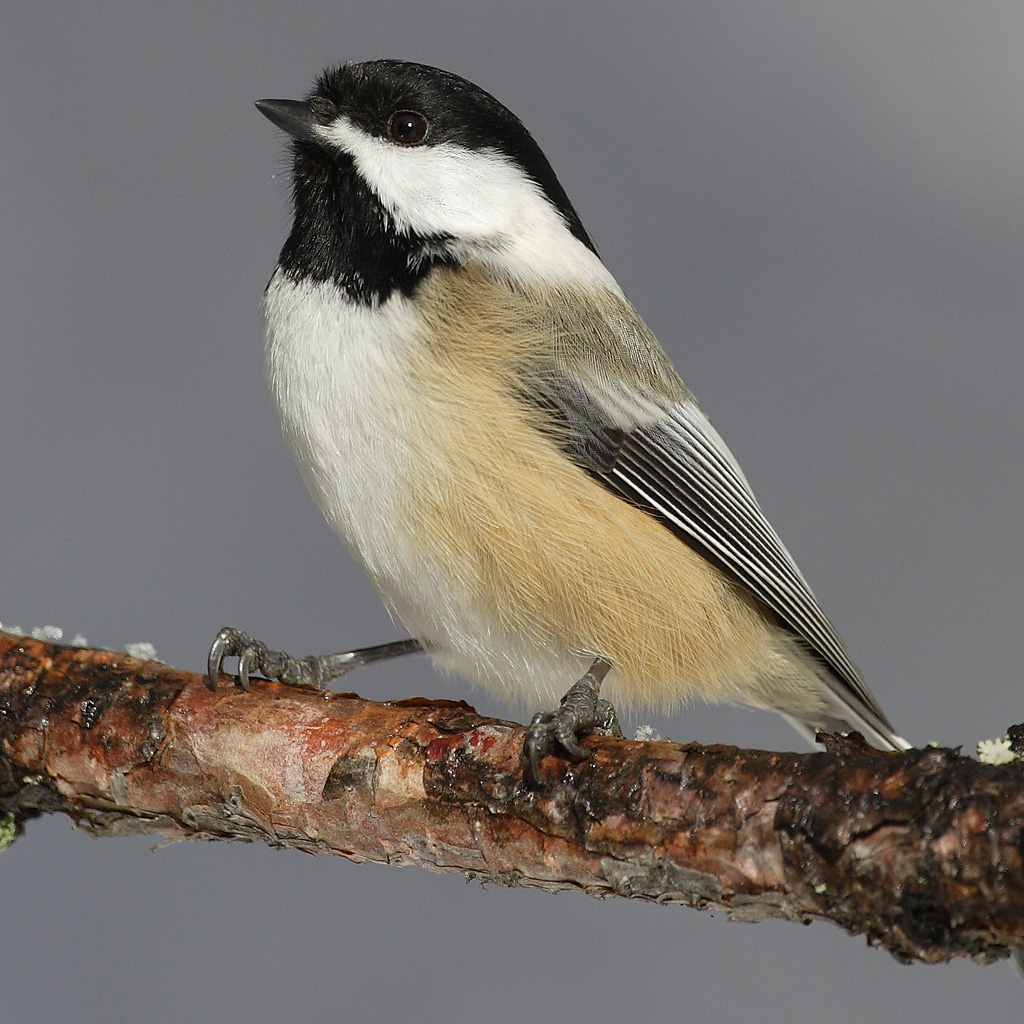
A black-capped chickadee, one of the species that can be observed in the park.

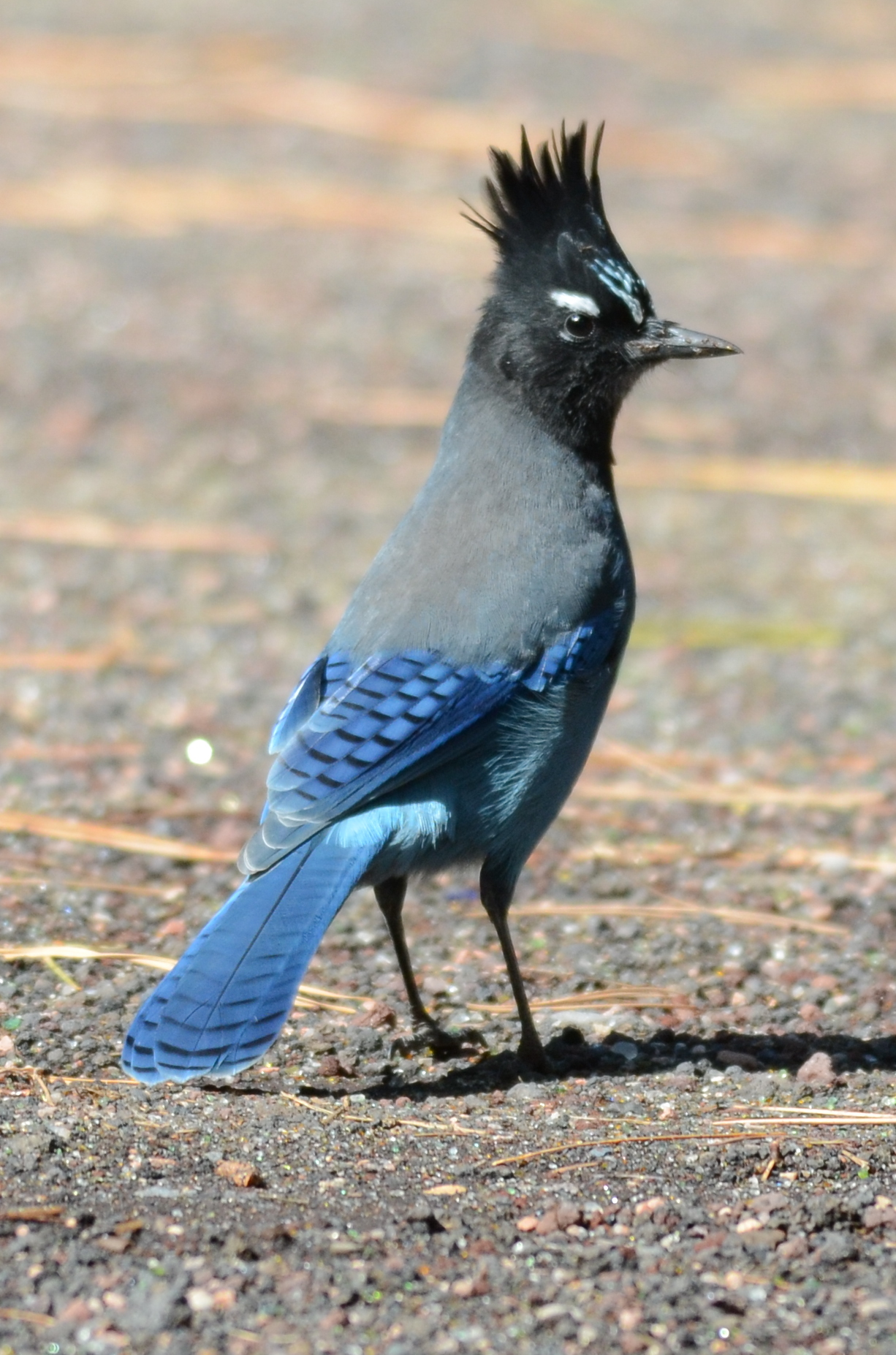
A Steller's Jay, notable with its distinct "shack-shack-shack" call.

== Everett Crowley Park Committee ==
The Everett Crowley Park Committee (ECPC) leads community stewardship of the park. The committee consists of members local neighbours, dog walkers, ecologists, and bird enthusiasts. The Vancouver Board of Parks and Recreation is responsible for the operational maintenance of the park and leads large-scale restoration work, involving the ECPC wherever possible. The ECPC has five main goals: park maintenance, recreation, education through appreciation of nature, habitat rehabilitation, and to work within a larger ecological context.

== Events ==
=== Earth Day ===
Earth Day Vancouver is hosted as an annual celebration in the City of Vancouver. Earth Day occurs on April 22, and is the "largest environmental event in the world". Citizens are encouraged to use more environmentally friendly means to travel to events, such as walking, biking, or taking public transit. Everett Crowley Park is the site of the city's longest-standing annual Earth Day celebration. Activities include tree planting, bird-watching, educational walks, and the event is supported by local businesses and the park board.

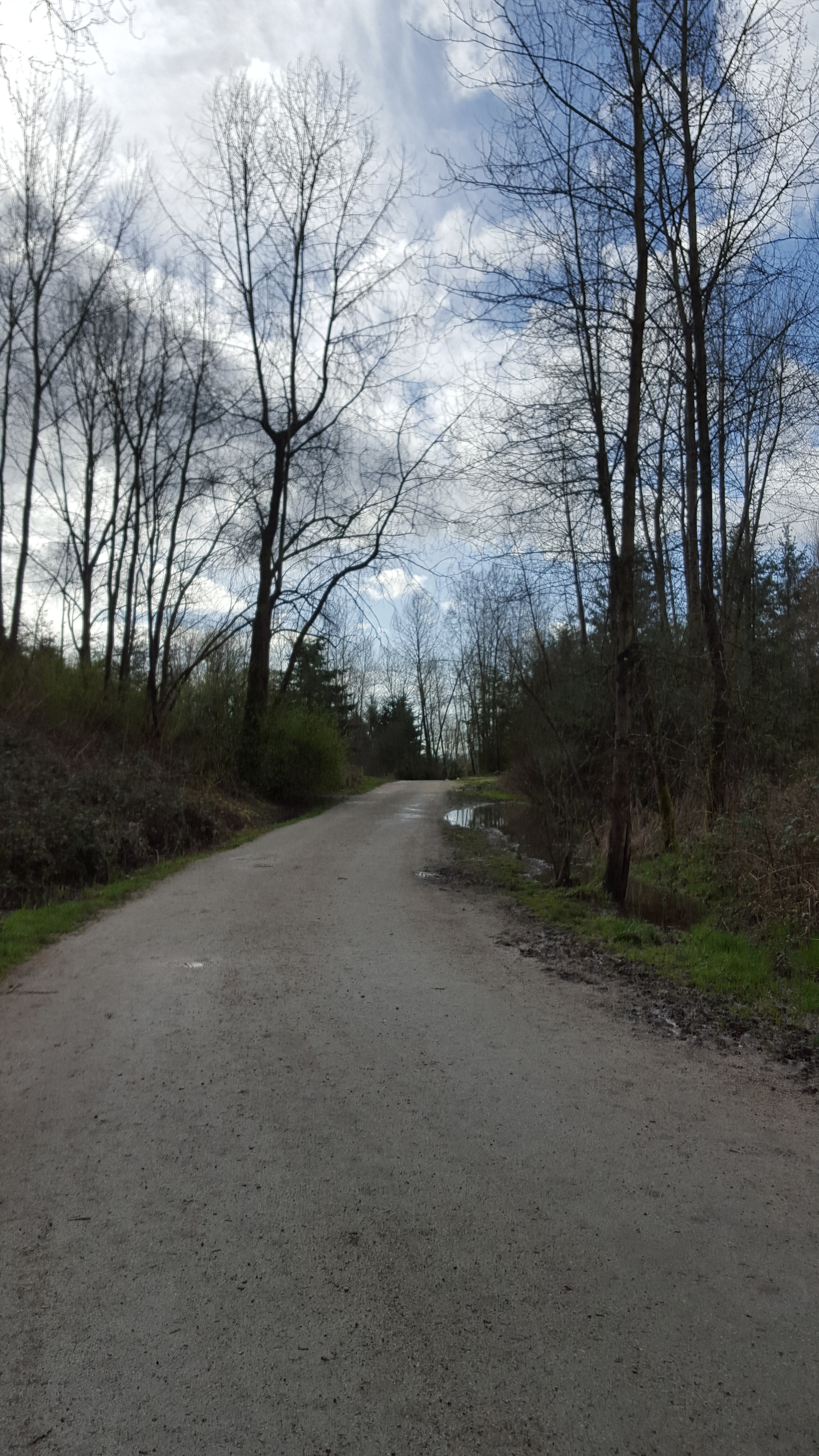
Vista Way Trail

== Attractions ==
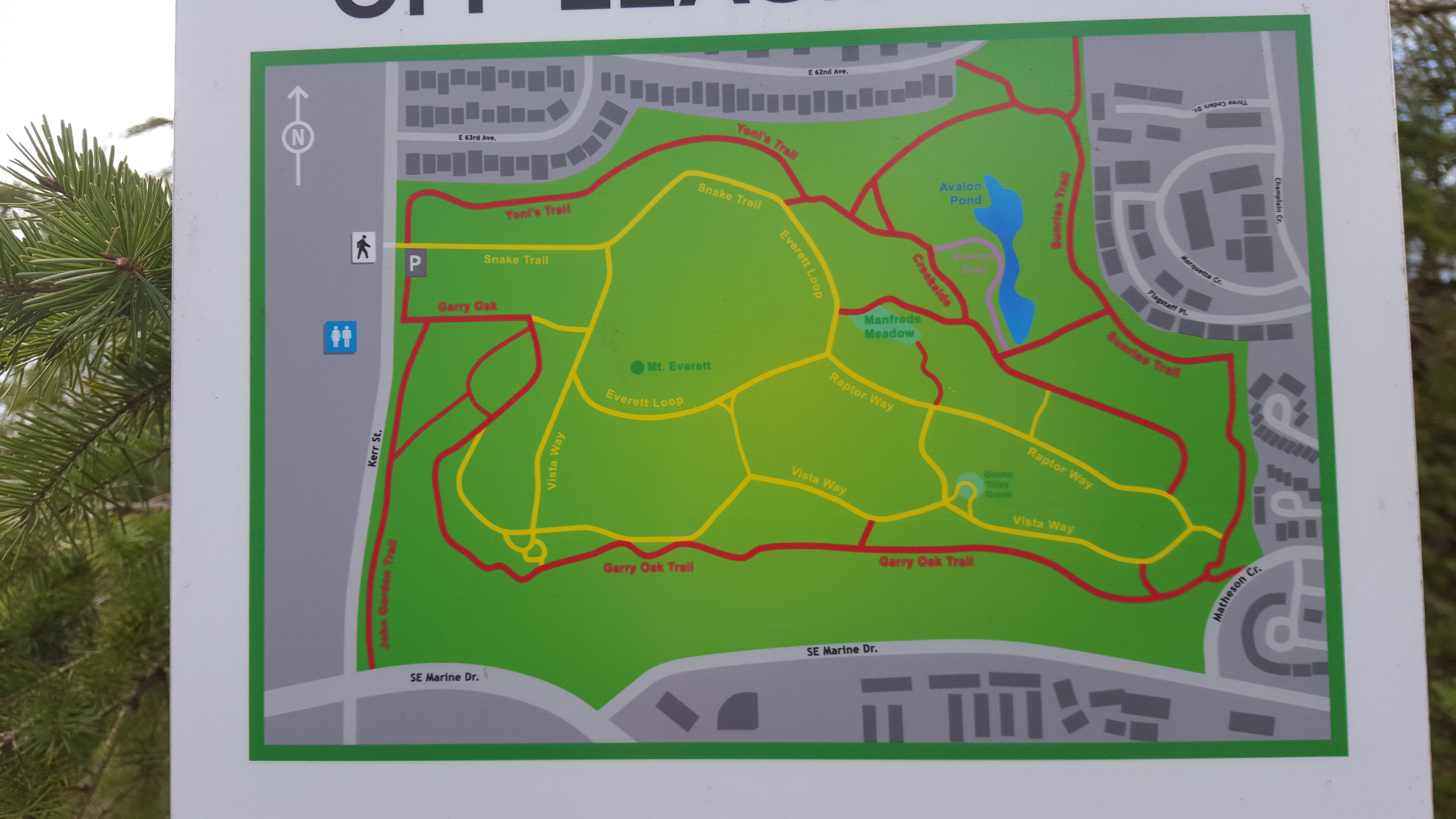
Trail map posted on a sign in the park.

=== Trails ===
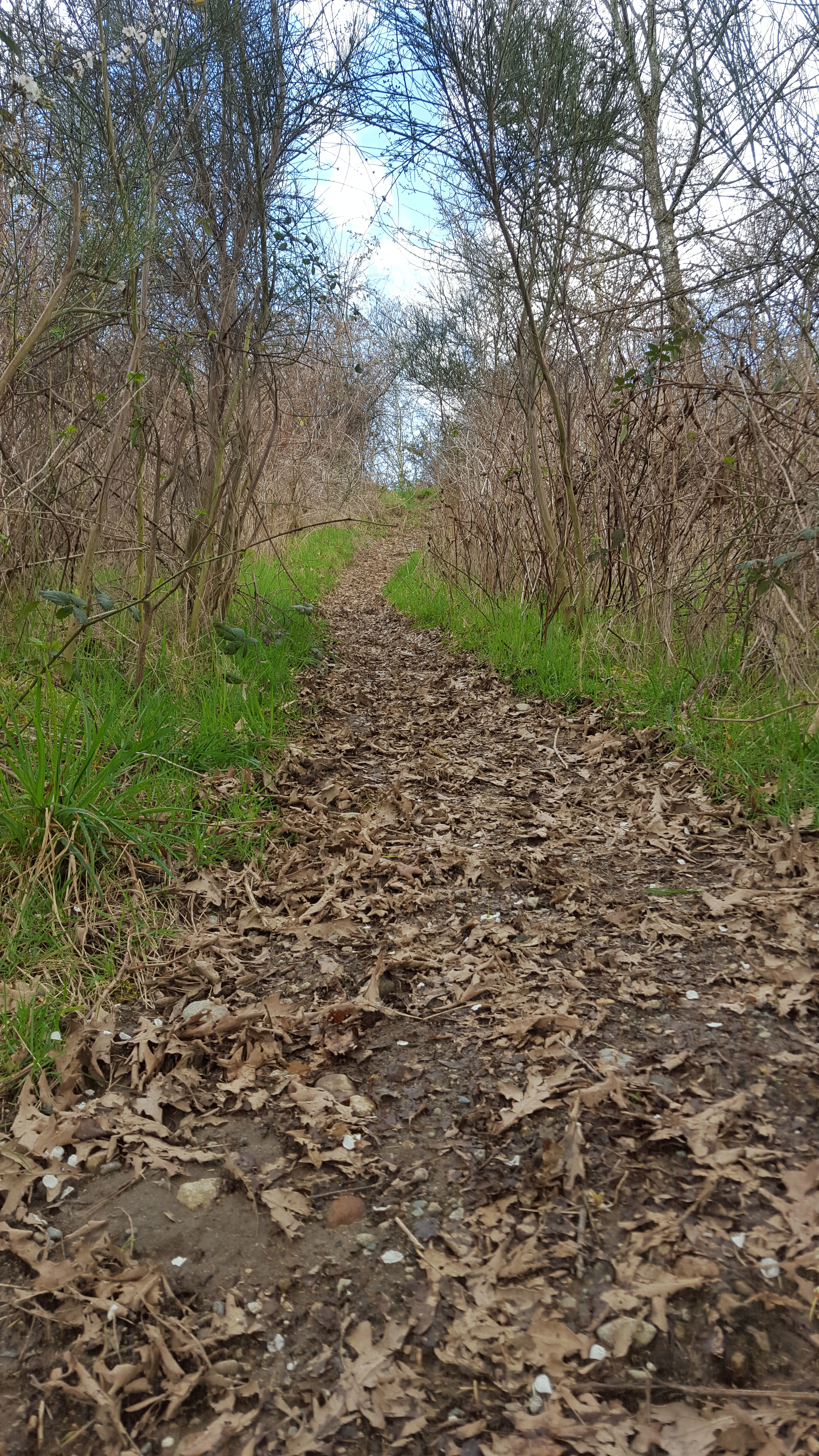
A smaller side trail, unnamed.

Everett Crowley is extremely popular for local dog owners who wish to have their dogs off leash.

There are several trails in the park, with the majority of trails tending to circle the perimeter of the park. There are also smaller trails that are unnamed that may be more favorable for people who wish for more of an adventure, or for those who want to explore the forest.

==== Notable trails and areas ====
Snake Trail: follows the entrance, is about 2.02 km long.

Vista Way Trail: leads to viewpoint on the North Edge of the Fraser River.

Kincross Creek: formerly used to have salmon running through it.

Manfred's Meadow: a large open area, suitable for picnics.

Mount Everett: point with the highest elevation in the park.

=== Blue Orchard Mason Bee ===
A pollinator garden and a mason bee condo have been installed to assist the Blue Orchard Mason Bee in Manfred's Meadow.

== Challenges ==
=== Being inclusive ===
Visitors often jog, cycle, or power walk in the park with their dogs as companions, but there are also visitors who prefer not to interact with dogs. To avoid conflict, the Vancouver Park Board have recommended to promote the awareness of responsible dog-handling and support initiatives such as the Canine Good Neighbour program, which is a 12-step test for dogs and the dogs will be accepted as a member of Canine Good Neighbor program upon completion of the test, to ensure that everybody can enjoy the beauty of the resource. Dog bowls are often left on the side of the trails, filled with water.

=== Vandalism and garbage ===
Vandalism such as spray painting, destruction of signs, and setting of fires have been problems with little solutions.

== Access ==
=== Walking ===
The park can be easily accessed from surrounding neighbourhoods, with trail entrances from Kerr Street, East 62nd Avenue, Marquette Crescent, Matheson Crescent, and Champlain Crescent.

=== Transit ===
The park can be accessed via TransLink's 26 (Champlain Crescent), 31 (Matheson Crescent), and 100 (Marine Drive) bus routes. Route 80 also connects the area to the rest of Marine Drive.

=== Parking ===
A small parking lot that holds about 15 cars is located by the entrance of the park. Parking is also available on the east side of Kerr Street and on Matheson Crescent.

== See also ==
- Champlain Heights, housing development adjacent to the park
- Killarney, Vancouver, neighbourhood of Vancouver that includes the park
