= Dunbar Street =

- Alma Street
- Type: Street
- Length: 5.4 km (3.4 mi)
- Location: Vancouver, British Columbia, Canada
- South end: 51st Avenue
- Major junctions: SW Marine Drive; 41st Avenue; 16th Avenue; Broadway
- North end: Burrard Inlet

Dunbar Street is a road in Vancouver, British Columbia, Canada. The street runs through the Dunbar–Southlands neighbourhood from 51st Avenue and the Point Grey Golf and Country Club in the south and continues to the north as Alma Street, via the Dunbar Diversion. The built-up commercial area along Dunbar Street is surrounded predominantly by single-family properties – the only such commercial strip in Vancouver. Separately, Dunbar Street runs through West Point Grey as a narrow residential road, from 13th Avenue to Point Grey Road.

The commercial area along Dunbar is resistant to change; many businesses in the area have been established in their locations for more than 50 years. Examples include Stong's Market, which opened in 1931, and the Dunbar Theatre, which has been in business since 1935. TransLink maintains the Dunbar Loop at the intersection of Dunbar and 41st Avenue and runs the 7 route along Dunbar Street, providing service from the Dunbar Loop to Nanaimo station.

== Route ==
Beginning at 16th Avenue near the Dunbar district, the street passes south, intersecting King Edward Avenue and on through 41st Avenue. It mostly passes through residential districts, with the exception near King Edward Avenue and 41st Avenue. It also passes by the Dunbar Loop of TransLink. The route ends at 51st Avenue, where the Point Grey Golf and Country Club lies to the south.

== Major intersections ==
The entire route is in Vancouver.

km	mi	Destinations	Notes
0.0	0.0	West 51st Avenue	Continues west as 51st Avenue
0.6	0.37	Southwest Marine Drive	
1.0	0.62	West 41st Avenue	
2.7	1.7	King Edward Avenue	
3.6– 3.7	2.2– 2.3	West 16th Avenue	Intersections offset, connected by 16th Avenue
3.9– 4.1	2.4– 2.5	Dunbar Diversion	Roadway becomes Dunbar Diversion at 14th Avenue, then becomes Alma Street
4.4	2.7	West 10th Avenue	
4.5	2.8	West Broadway	
4.9	3.0	West 4th Avenue	
5.4	3.4	dead end	Northern terminus
1.000 mi = 1.609 km; 1.000 km = 0.621 mi: Route transition
