= December 2018 British Columbia storms =

Weather events in Canada

Several storms struck the coast of British Columbia in December 2018, some causing damage, and one death.

== December 8 ==
Winds of over 80 kilometres per hour (50 mph) were expected for Haida Gwaii, as well as western Vancouver Island. Environment Canada warned people near the South Klondike Highway to avoid non-essential travel, due to snow and wind.

== December 11 ==
Heavy rain in Metro Vancouver caused flash flooding in South and East Vancouver, as well as Burnaby. Several buildings were slightly damaged, and many cars were submerged. The SkyTrain line between Sapperton station and Scott Road station were temporarily suspended due to flooding. Several roads in Burnaby were closed.

== December 13 ==
On December 13 a strong frontal system impacted the western coast, dropping 77.5 millimetres (3.05 in) of rain on downtown Vancouver, and 67.0 millimetres (2.64 in) at the Vancouver International Airport. Snowfall warnings were also put in place for the Coquihalla, and other high elevation places.

== December 20 ==
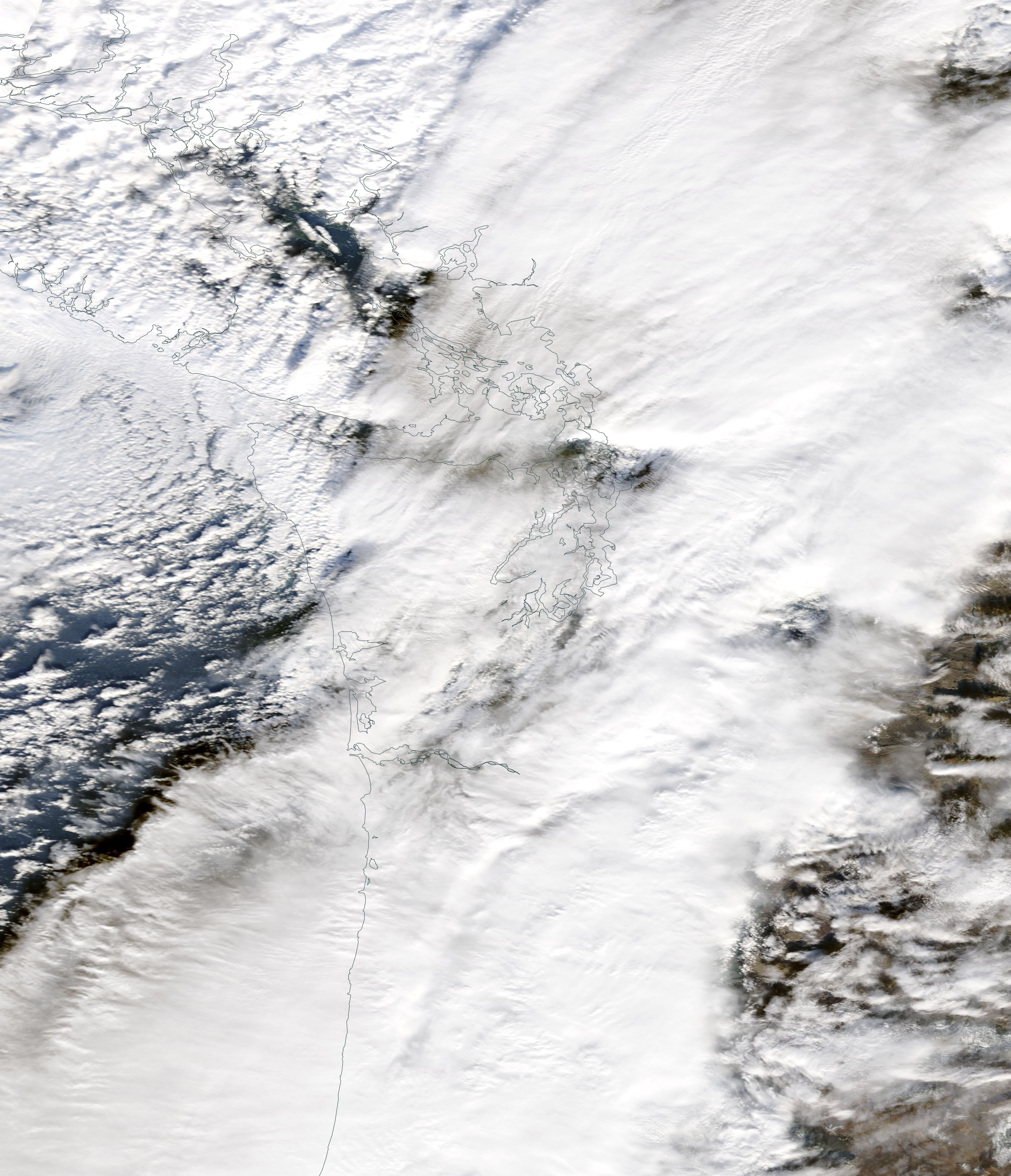
Storms over the northwest coast on December 20, 2018.

Starting in the morning, severe winds hit Metro Vancouver gusting up to 112 kilometres per hour (70 mph) affecting Delta and White Rock the worst. One person in Duncan on Vancouver Island was killed when struck by a falling tree. A Surrey man was severely injured after a tree fell on him. The famous White Rock Pier built in 1914 partially collapsed, trapping a man. He was later rescued by helicopter, without any injuries. 22 of the 30 boats moored at the pier were destroyed or severely damaged.

600,000 people were left without power, including at least 100,000 on Vancouver Island. 34,000 people were still without power as of the evening of the 23rd. Collapsed trees in North Saanich slowed traffic. Ferry rides to Victoria and Nanaimo were also cancelled due to wind and waves. A constable with the Abbotsford police department stated that a barn "went airborne". Windows had also been blown out of some high-rises.

The US state of Washington was also affected. Approximately 300,000 homes and businesses lost power, and 300 flights were delayed at the Seattle-Tacoma International Airport.
