= Champlain Heights =

- Neighbourhood
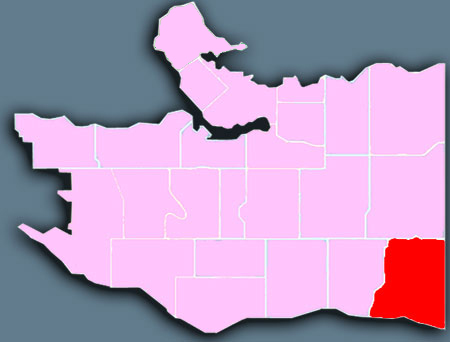

- Location in Metro Vancouver
- Coordinates: 49.215°N 123.032°W
- Country: Canada
- Province: British Columbia
- City: Vancouver

Champlain Heights is a neighbourhood in the city of Vancouver, British Columbia, Canada.

It is a family-friendly community with a mix of housing types (market, co-operative, and social) built around green spaces and walking trails, including Everett Crowley Park, the fifth-largest park in Vancouver.

Champlain Heights was one of the last areas of Vancouver to be urbanized. Harold Kalman, an architectural historian stated, "The showcase residential community was planned in the early 1970s, with curved roads and cul-de-sacs serving a mix of housing types and income levels." Located in the extreme south eastern corner of Vancouver, Champlain Heights is often closely associated with the neighbourhood of Killarney and it is officially a sub-neighborhood within Killarney. It consists mainly of various townhouse complexes and co-op housing units. The majority of the Champlain Heights area is leasehold property (pre-paid 99-year leases from the City of Vancouver, expiring in the 2080s).

Everett Crowley Park, a 40-hectare park (the city's 5th largest) and a former city landfill, is located in the area. The park is named after Everett Crowley, former city planner and parks board commissioner. Everett Crowley Park is the home of the longest Earth Day Celebration in the City. The City has been using this celebration as part of its long term reforestation project for the Park.

The education in the area is serviced by Champlain Heights Elementary School, designed by one of Canada's foremost architects, Arthur Erickson. Champlain Heights Elementary School services grades from kindergarten to grade seven. The school has many different extracurricular programs such as a photography club, knitting club, volleyball team, and basketball team. There is also an annex located on Champlain Crescent which provides education to children in kindergarten to grade three. The Annex also provides program space to other community groups which include a program for children age newborn to five years old and their caregivers or parents as well as community space to the nearby public recreation centre. Those moving on to grade four from the annex usually transfer to the main school.

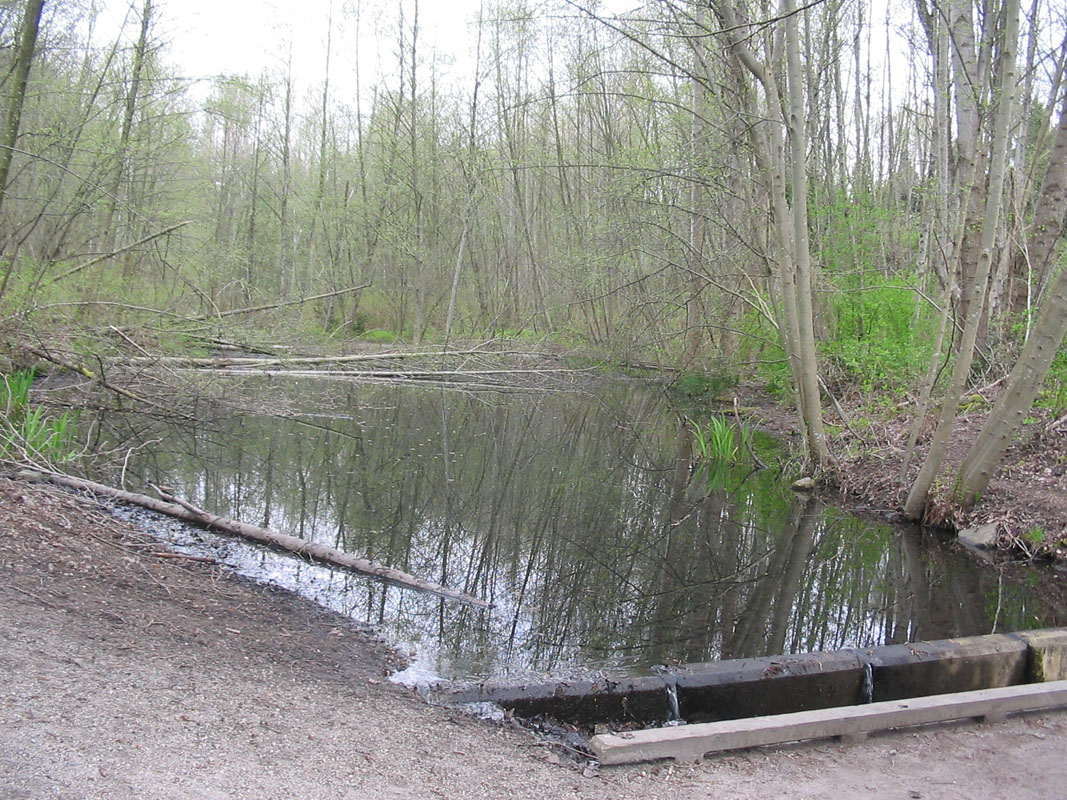
Avalon Pond, part of Everett Crowley Park.

== History ==
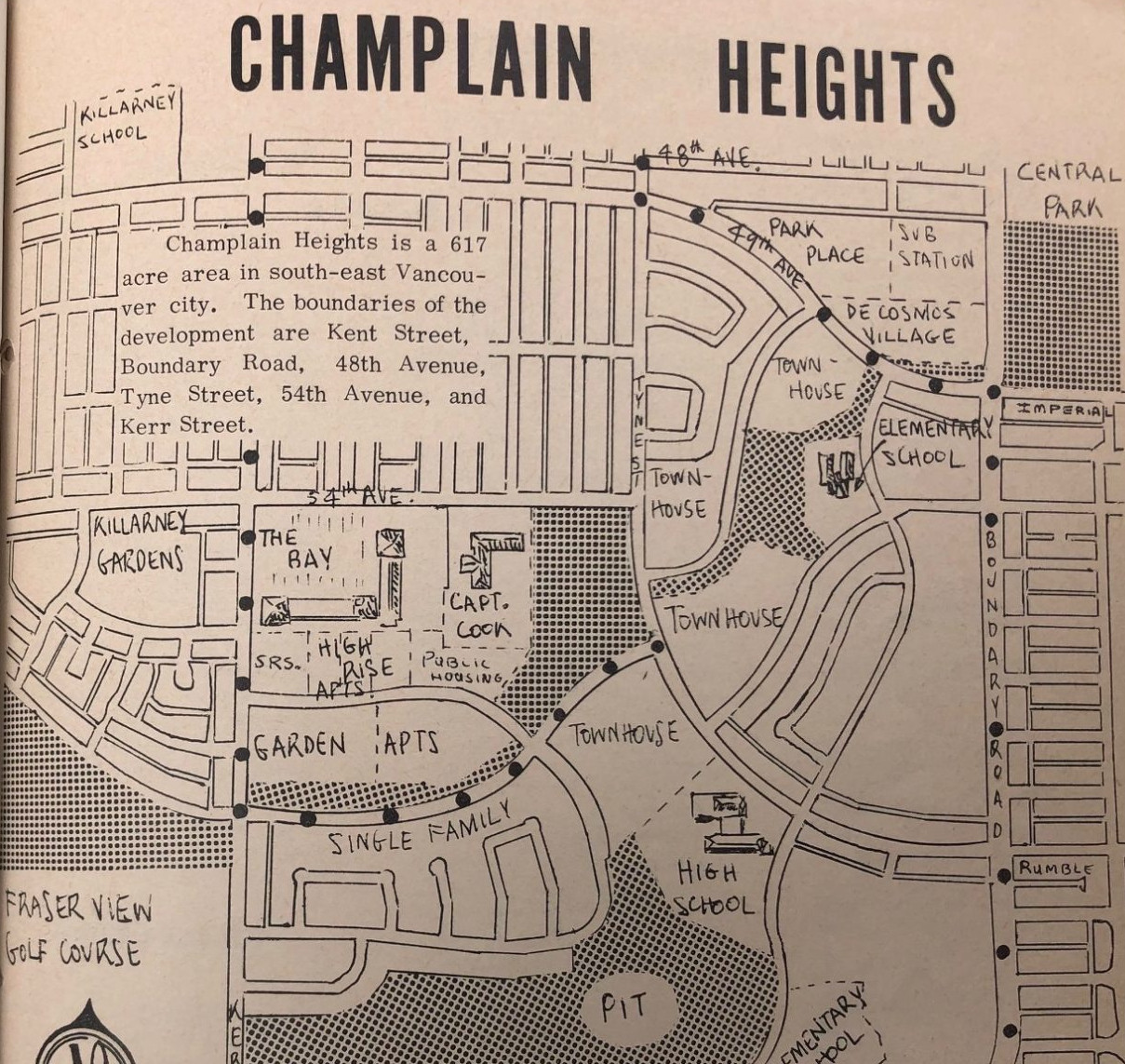
Picture of Champlain Heights from early 1980s taken from a book

Champlain Heights was developed in the early 1980s and was one of the last areas of Vancouver to be urbanized, on a then undeveloped 614 acre tract of land. Harold Kalman, an architectural historian stated, "The showcase residential community was planned in the early 1970s, with curved roads and cul-de-sacs serving a mix of housing types and income levels." According to planning documents, the goals for Champlain Heights were to accommodate a broad range of lifestyles and incomes within the community, to establish identifiable neighbourhoods, to separate pedestrian from vehicular traffic where possible, and to retain and emphasize the natural amenities of the area and integrate them into the development.
