= Dunbar–Southlands =

Neighborhood of Vancouver, British Columbia, Canada

- Neighbourhood
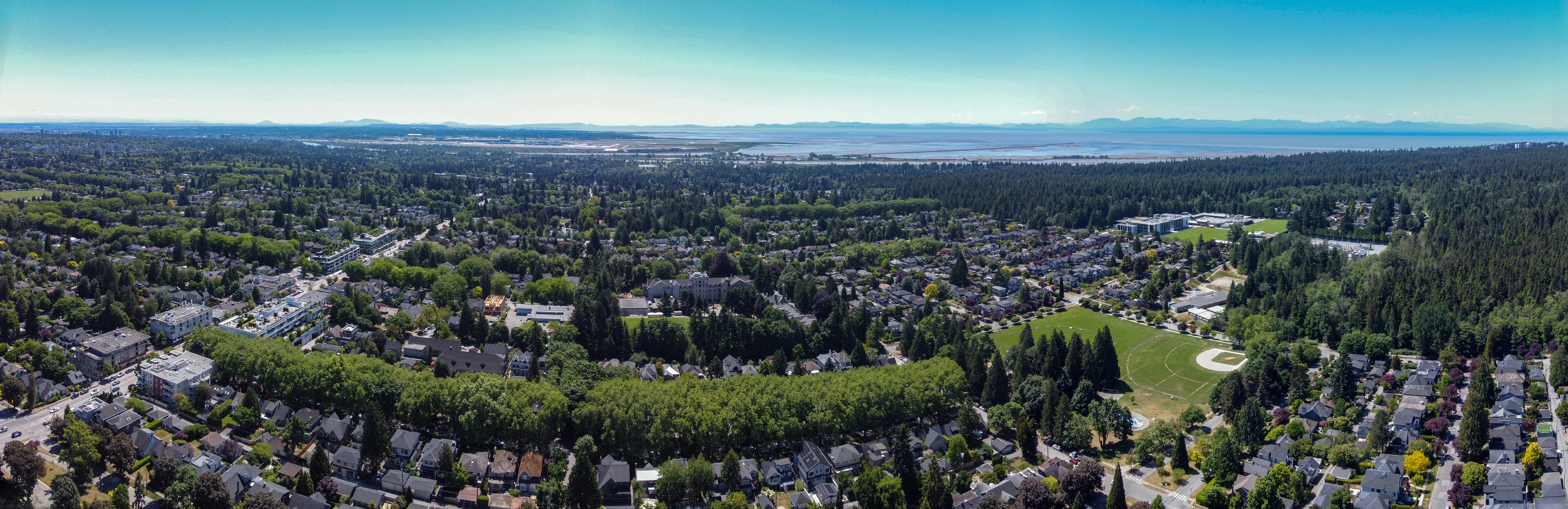
- Aerial view in 2026

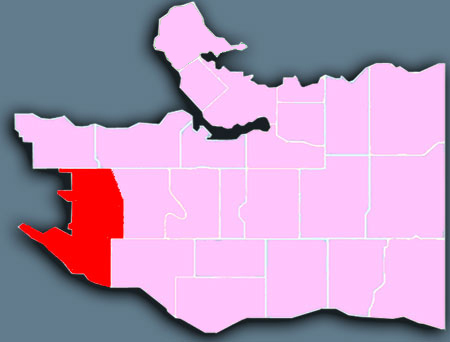
- Location of Dunbar–Southlands in Vancouver
- Coordinates: 49°15′00″N 123°11′06″W
- Country: Canada
- Province: British Columbia
- Region: Lower Mainland
- Regional district: Metro Vancouver

Area
  - Total: 8.56 km^{2} (3.31 sq mi)

Population (2016)
  - Total: 21,425
  - Density: 2,502.9/km^{2} (6,482/sq mi)

Dunbar–Southlands is a neighbourhood situated on the western side of Vancouver, British Columbia, Canada, that stretches north from the Fraser River and covers most of the land between the mouth of the Fraser and English Bay.

This neighbourhood consists of many commercial and residential areas that mostly consists of single-family dwellings. It also contains parts of the Mackenzie Heights enclave, and is the home territory of the Musqueam Indian Band.

== History ==
Archaeological findings shows that native First Nations have inhabited the area was early as 400 B.C. The Fraser provided large amounts of hunting and fishing areas for Salish Indians who settled at three locations. As recently as 15,000 years ago, it was buried under a sheet of glacial ice.

In 1908, the land in the Dunbar area was owned by the Canadian Pacific Railway and was part of the now defunct, Municipality of Point Grey. At that time, the land was unstable for development. The first non-native settlers purchased a lot on 22nd Avenue.

By 1927, the area was served by three streetcar routes. Dunbar–Southlands became a part of Vancouver in 1929 when the Municipality of Point Grey merged with the City of Vancouver.

The first major land development in Dunbar–Southlands took place in the mid-1920s with some of the homes that were built during this period still standing to this day. Due to West Point Grey's 1922 zoning, by-laws ordered that these early homes be situated on the back of their lots; those that remain stand out as neighbourhood landmarks.

== Geography ==
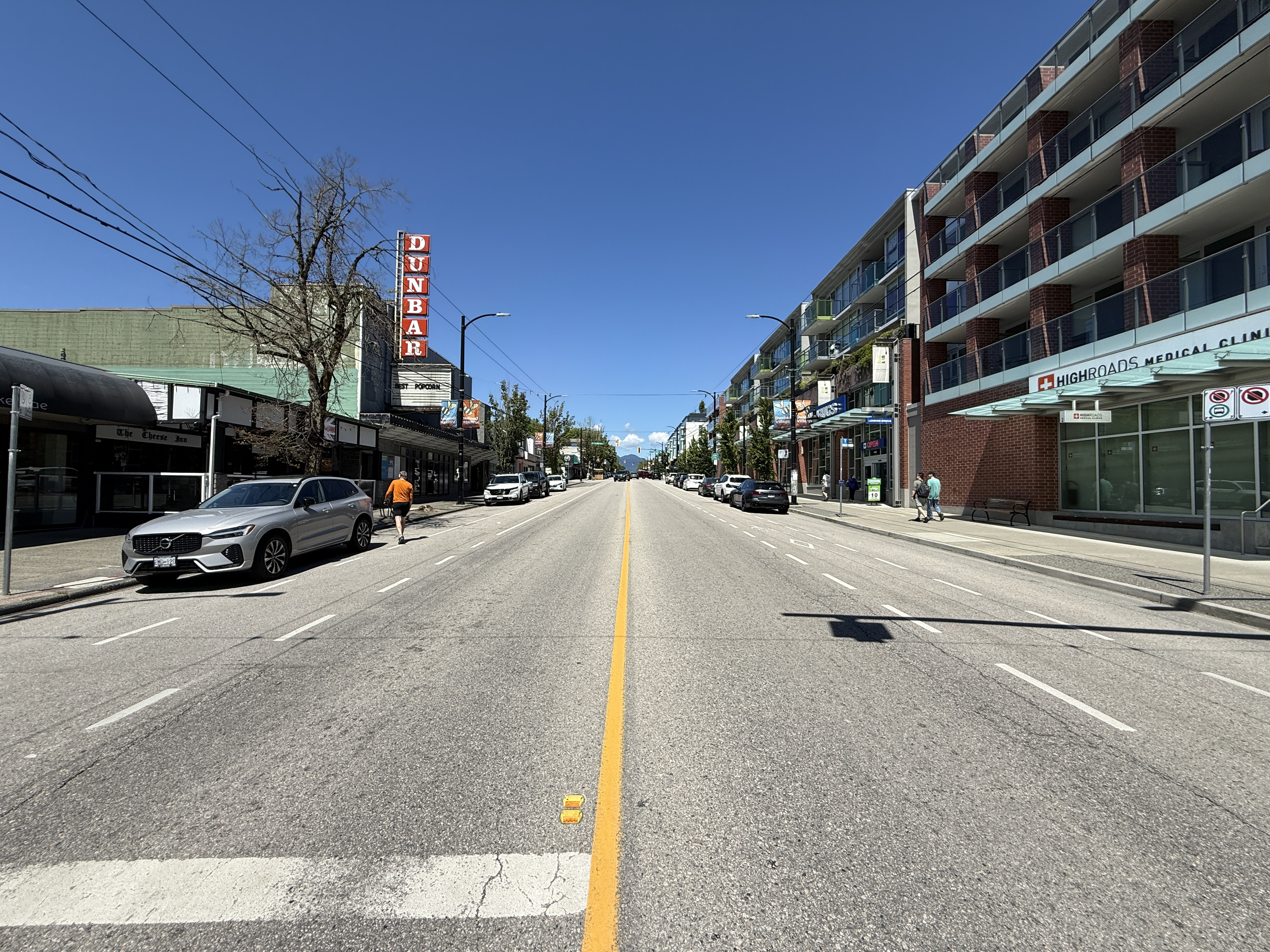
Dunbar Street at W 30th Avenue in 2026

Dunbar–Southlands is bordered on the north by West 16th Avenue and on the south by the Fraser River; it stretches from the University Endowment Lands on the west to Mackenzie, Quesnel and Blenheim Streets in the east. The neighborhood is centered on Dunbar Street while the vicinity of Southlands lies south of Marine Drive in the floodplain of the Fraser River, and the Musqueam Indian Reserve is also encompassed by the region.

== Demographics ==
Panethnic groups in the Dunbar–Southlands neighbourhood (2001−2016)
Panethnic group	2016		2006		2001	
Panethnic group	Pop.	%	Pop.	%	Pop.	%
European (Note: Statistic includes all persons that did not make up part of a visible minority or an indigenous identity.)	12,135	57.01%	14,280	66.98%	15,020	70.82%
East Asian (Note: Statistic includes total responses of "Chinese", "Korean", and "Japanese" under visible minority section on census.)	6,955	32.68%	5,190	24.34%	4,770	22.49%
Indigenous	880	4.13%	785	3.68%	585	2.76%
South Asian	400	1.88%	260	1.22%	340	1.6%
Southeast Asian (Note: Statistic includes total responses of "Filipino" and "Southeast Asian" under visible minority section on census.)	280	1.32%	235	1.1%	210	0.99%
Latin American	175	0.82%	150	0.7%	25	0.12%
Middle Eastern (Note: Statistic includes total responses of "West Asian" and "Arab" under visible minority section on census.)	140	0.66%	150	0.7%	35	0.17%
African	120	0.56%	45	0.21%	85	0.4%
Other/Multiracial (Note: Statistic includes total responses of "Visible minority, n.i.e." and "Multiple visible minorities" under visible minority section on census.)	205	0.96%	220	1.03%	150	0.71%
Total responses	21,285	99.35%	21,320	99.26%	21,210	99.53%
Total population	21,425	100%	21,480	100%	21,310	100%
Note: Totals greater than 100% due to multiple origin responses

== Parks and services ==
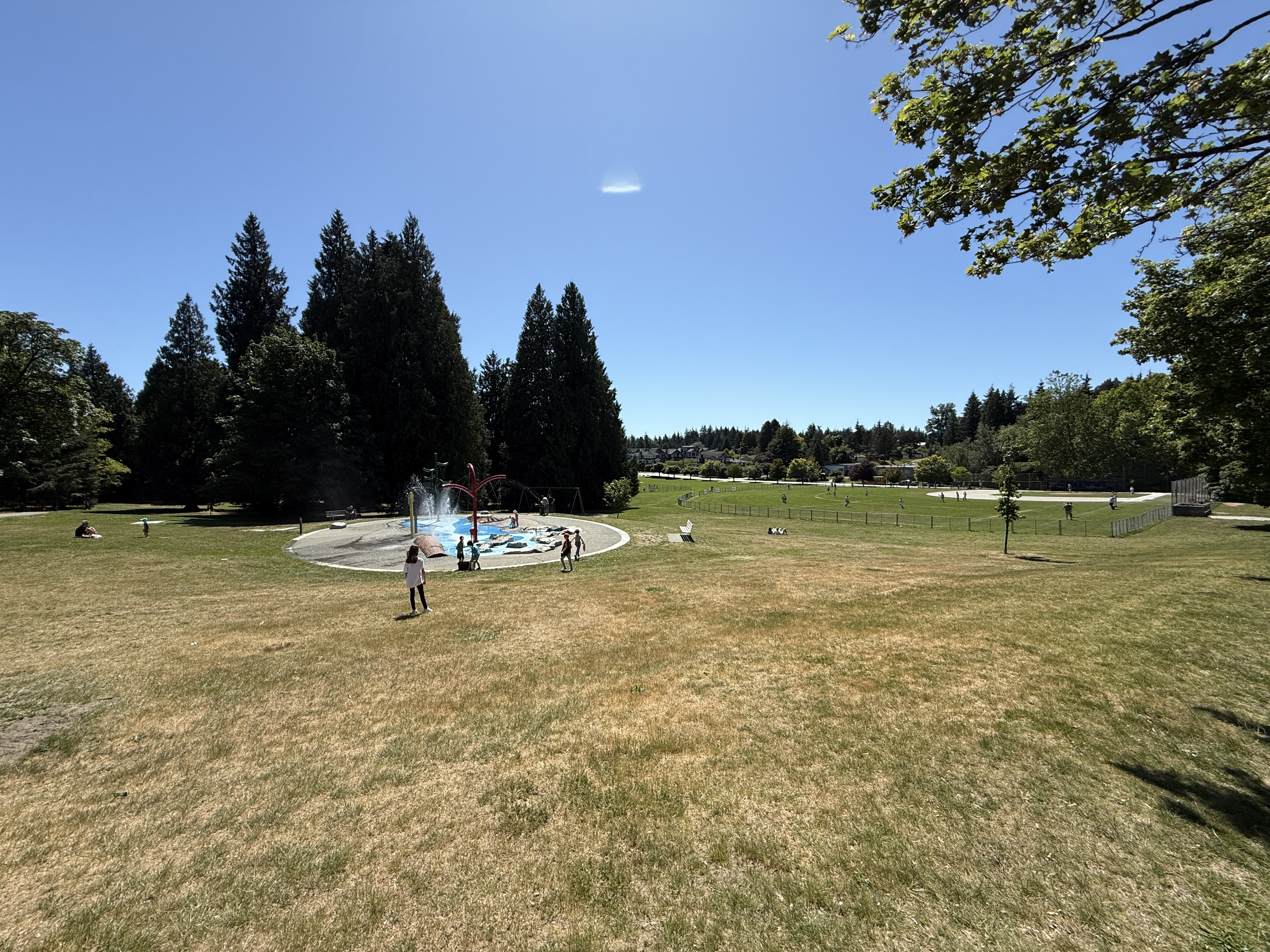
Chaldecott Park

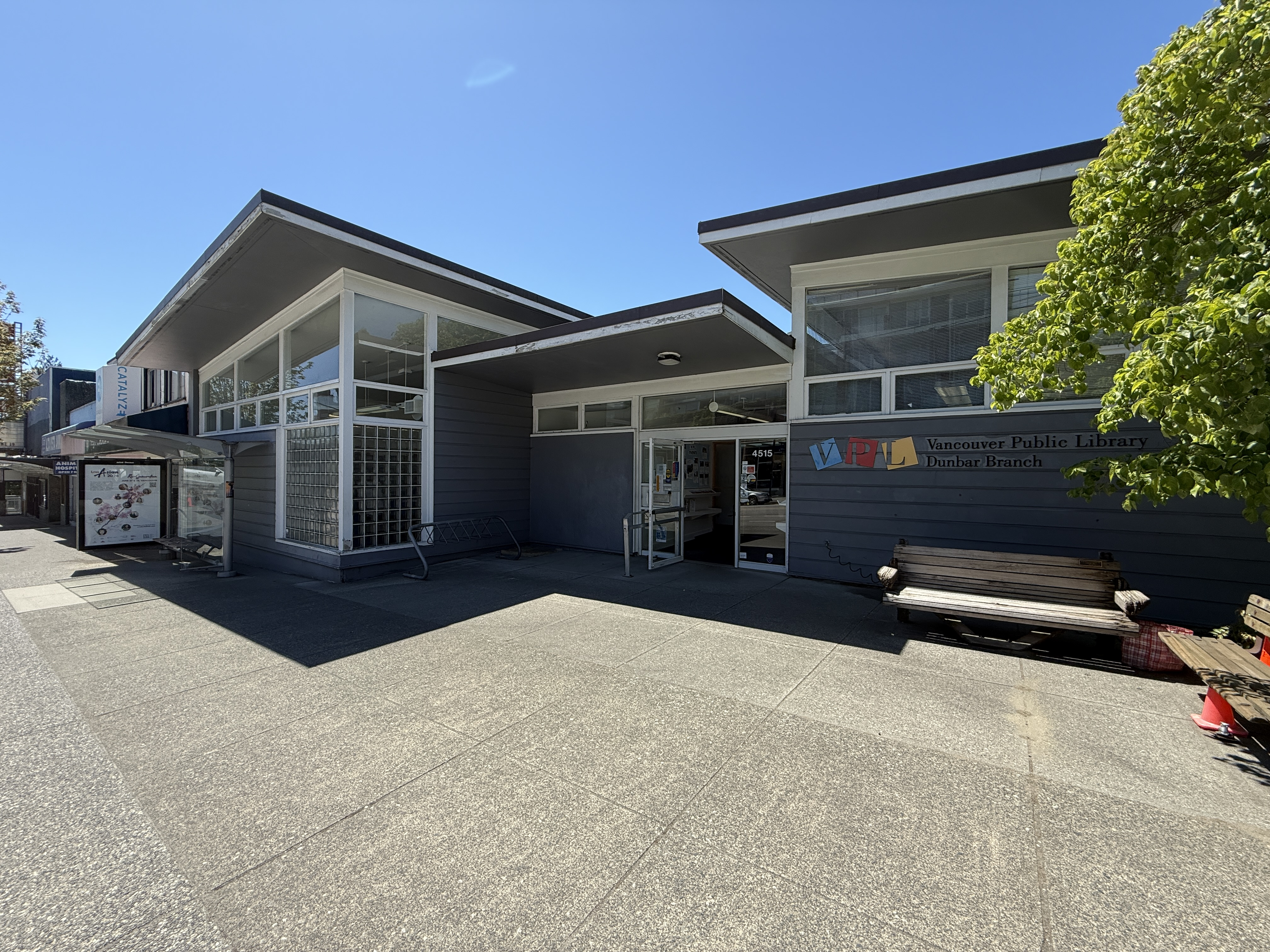
Vancouver Public Library-Dunbar Branch

The Vancouver Park Board and the Metro Vancouver Regional Parks maintains a total of 10 parks in Dunbar–Southlands, including the Pacific Spirit Park, which contains 55.5 km of trails.

The Dunbar Community Centre is jointly operated by the Vancouver Park Board and the Dunbar Community Centre Association.

The Vancouver Public Library also maintains a branch in the Dunbar–Southlands district.

The Vancouver Fire and Rescue Services operates the Vancouver Fire Hall No 21 which serves the Dunbar region.

The area also contains many golf courses including the Musqueam Golf Course, Point Grey Golf Club, Shaughnessy Golf Club, and Marine Drive Golf Club.
