= White Rock Pier =

Pier in White Rock, British Columbia, Canada

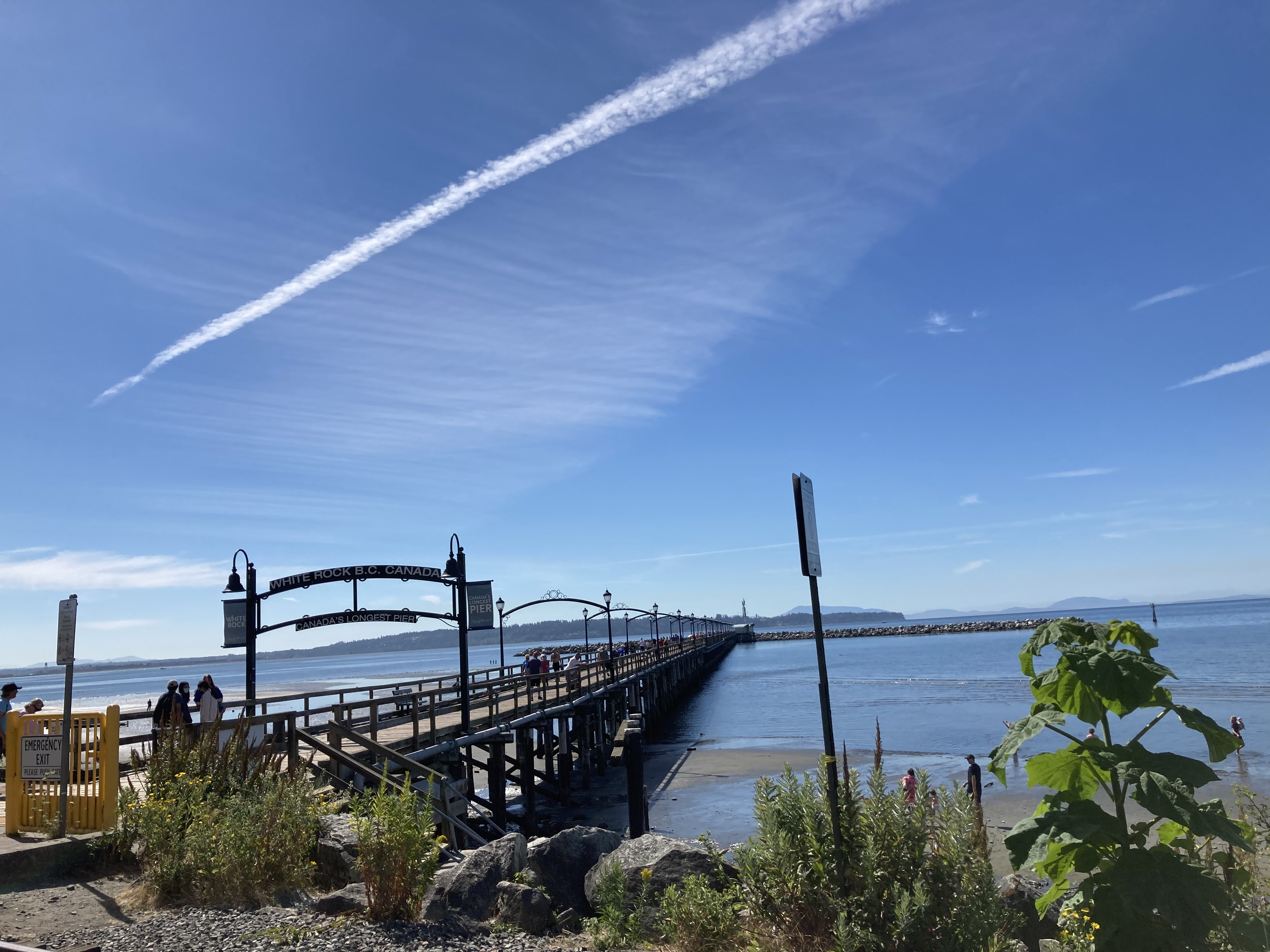
- White Rock Pier in 2022
- Type: Dock
- Coordinates: 49°1′9″N 122°48′20″W

Characteristics
- Total length: 470 metres (1,540 ft)

History
- Opening date: 1914
- Rebuilt: 2019
- Destruction date: 20 December 2018

White Rock Pier is a 470-metre-long (1,540 ft) pier in White Rock, British Columbia. The pier has a sign identifying it as Canada's longest pier. However, the title is disputed with the Quai de Portneuf in Portneuf, Quebec, which is built in the same manner as the longer causeway at the nearby Tsawwassen ferry terminal.

== History ==
The original version of the pier was built in 1912 and resembled nothing more than a floating dock about 300 feet in length. It was destroyed by winter storms in 1913.

In 1914 the pier was rebuilt with an eye to making it a dock for steamships that arrived when the Great Northern Railway began operation. Although it was completed in August of that year, the onset of the First World War pushed the official opening back to November 14, 1914. The pier, now about 800 feet long, was granted a federal government approved extension in 1915 to 1542 ft.

The pier fell into disrepair several times over the years, often requiring government funding and community fundraising to restore it. The constant battering by storms and subsequent damage finally led to the completion in 1953 of a permanent rock breakwater at the end of the pier.

The pier almost caught fire a few times due to the proximity of nearby burning buildings and the fact that the pier was made of wood. In the 1940s & 1950s, the White Rock Pier was home to the Dolphin Restaurant. Around the same time, cars were allowed, leading to teenagers holding drag races on the pier, further damaging the structure.

On December 20, 2018, the pier was damaged during a severe wind storm, causing sailboats to be released from their moorings and forced under and up through the pier, destroying a large midsection of the pier. A stranded pedestrian also required a Coast Guard rescue. It was estimated that the cost to rebuild the pier would be $16.2 million. The pier was repaired and reopened in 2019.

Completed in 2024, the pier features an accessibility mat on the deck that is designed to smooth out the bumpy, uneven surface of the pier planks allowing it to be used safely by those with mobility challenges such as those in wheelchairs, with walkers, or the visually impaired.

== Gallery ==
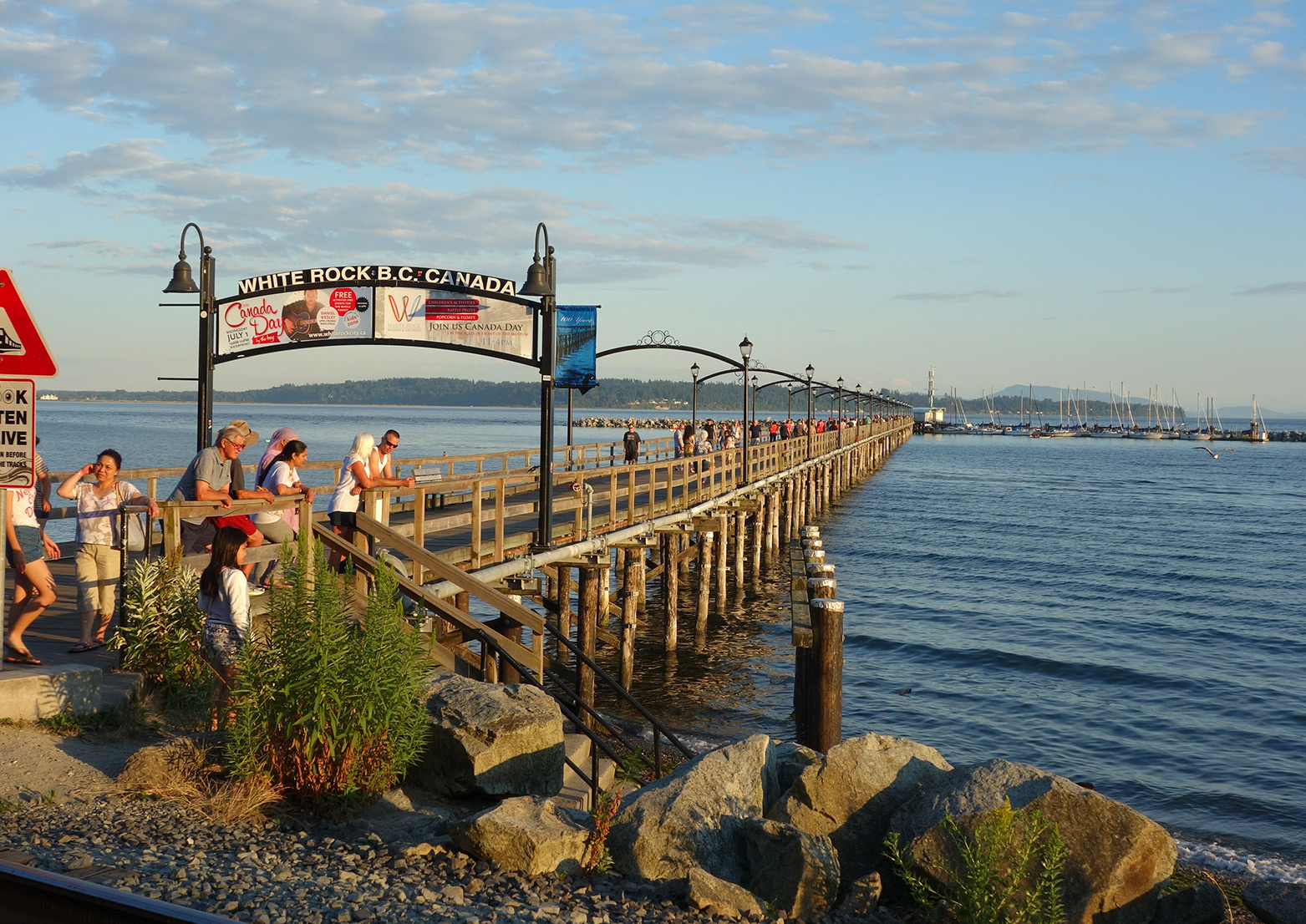
The pier as it appeared in 2015, prior to severe storm damage

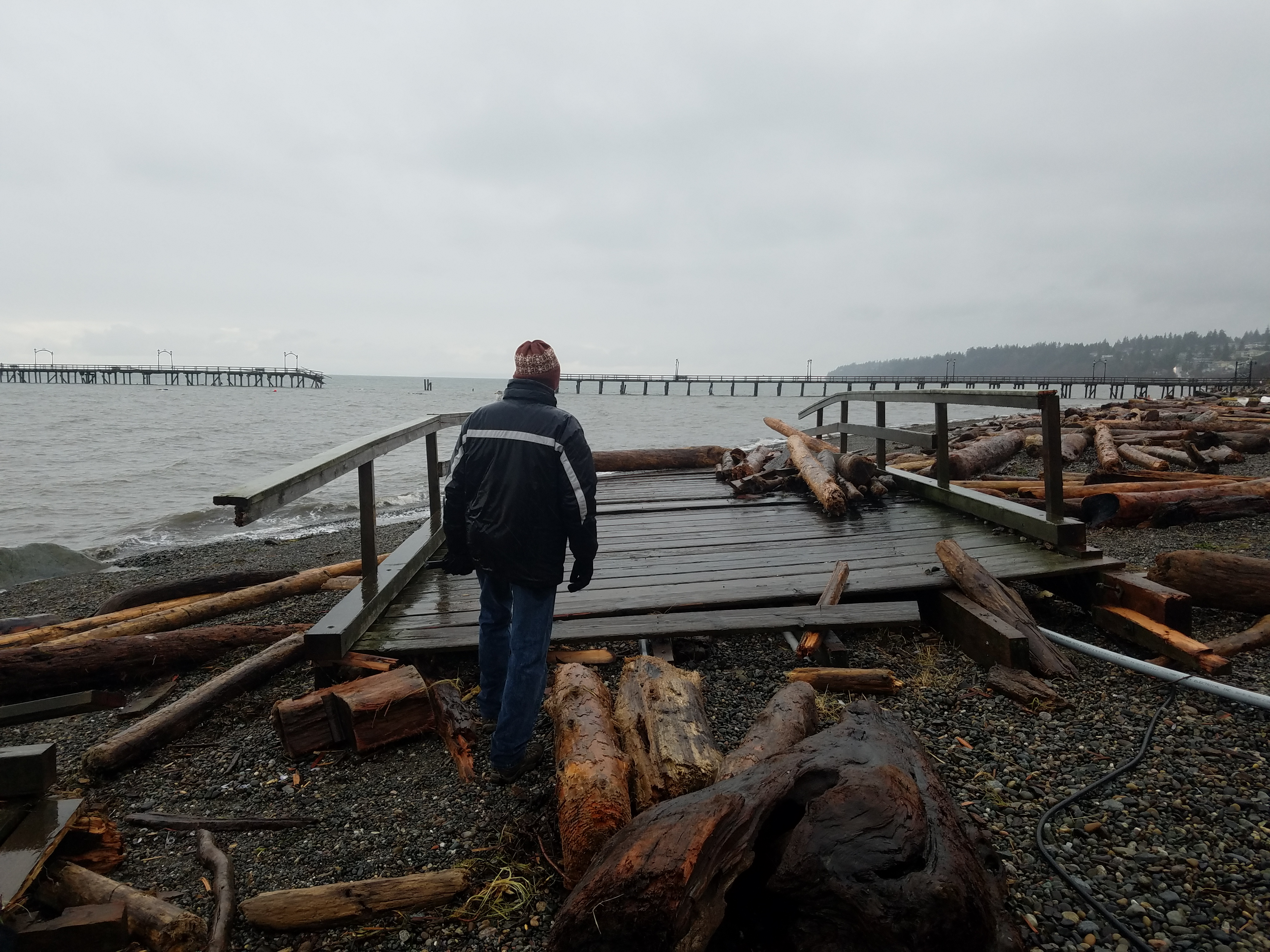
A portion of the pier on the beach after the storm, with the destroyed pier visible in the background

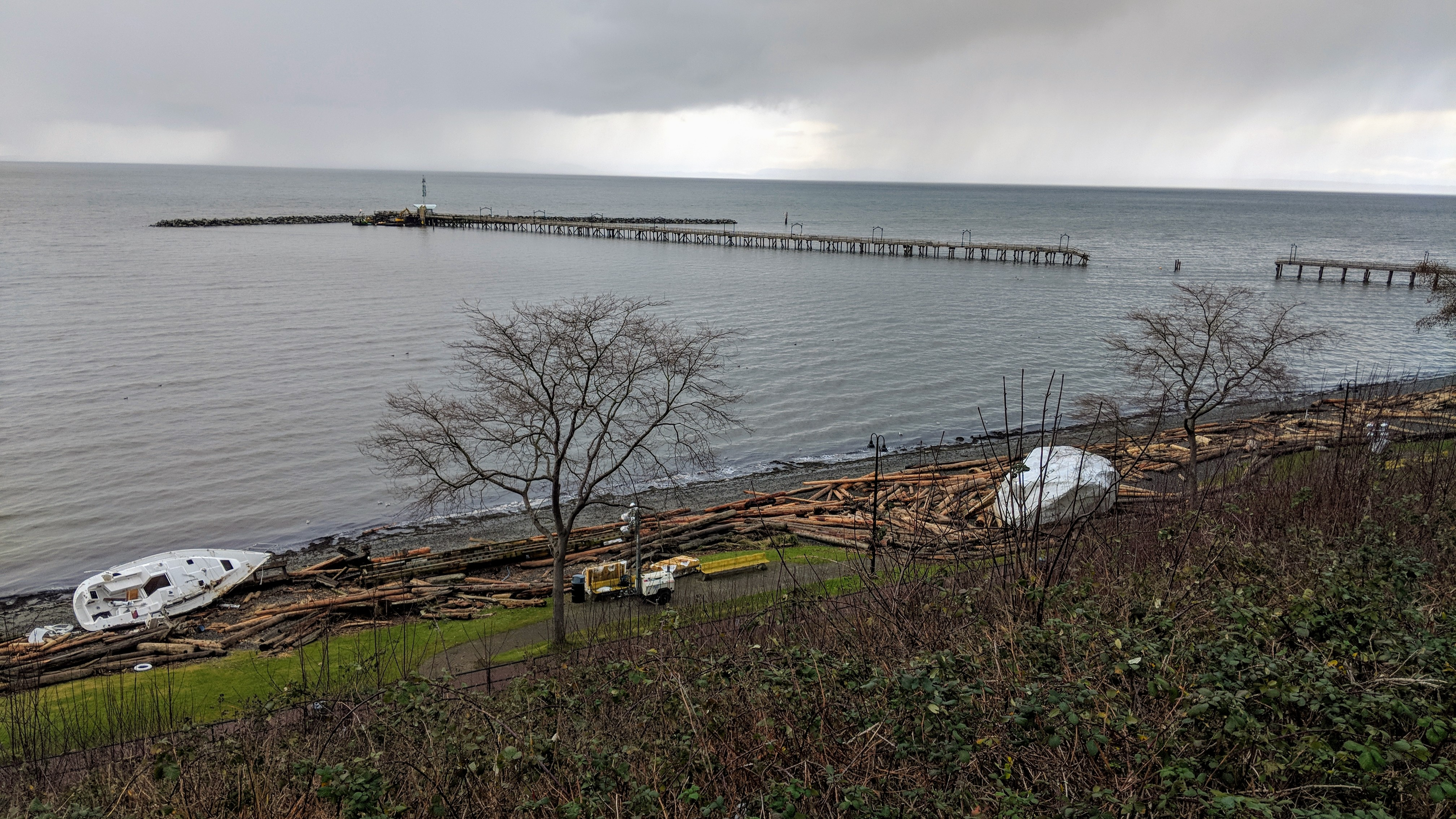
Full view of the pier after the December 2018 wind storm
