= Killarney, Vancouver =

Killarney
- Neighbourhood
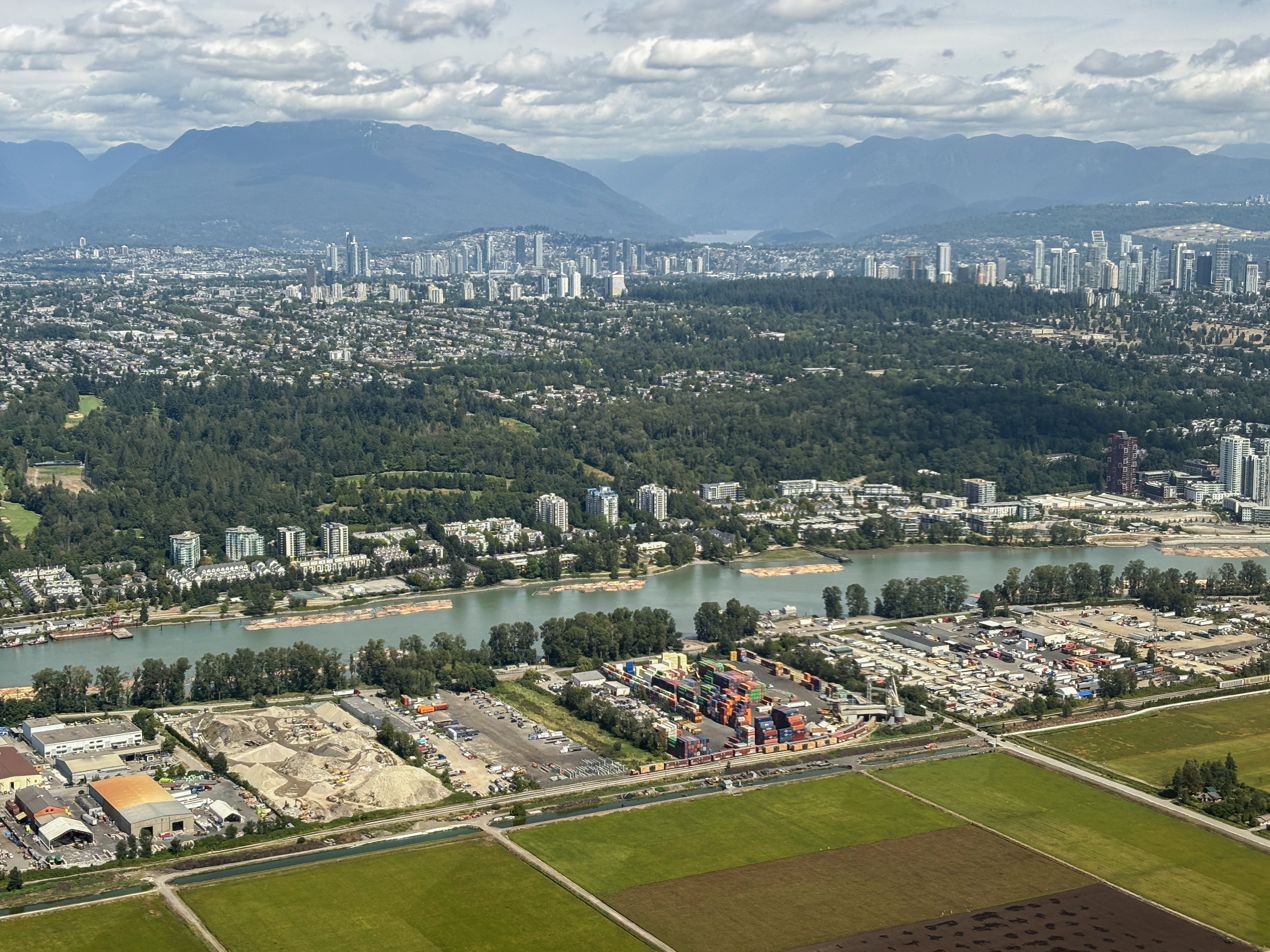
- Aerial view of Killarney in 2025

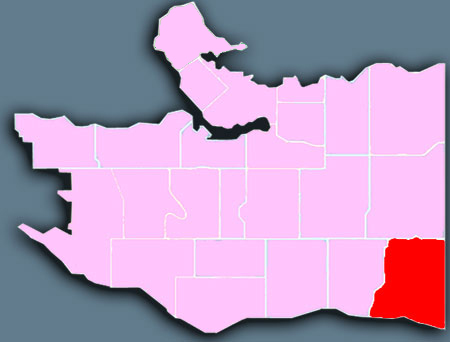
- Location of Killarney in Vancouver

- Location in Metro Vancouver
- Coordinates: 49.223°N 123.039°W
- Country: Canada
- Province: British Columbia
- City: Vancouver
- Region: East Vancouver
- Named for: Killarney, Ireland

Area
  - Total: 6.64 km^{2} (2.56 sq mi)

Population (2016)
  - Total: 29,325
  - Density: 4,416.4/km^{2} (11,438/sq mi)

Killarney is a neighbourhood in East Vancouver, British Columbia with a population of over 28,000 in 2011 and lies in the far southeast corner of the city. It is on the south slope of the ridge that rises above the Fraser River, and contains a collection of single-family residences with a few multi-family homes as well as the townhouses and high-rises of the Fraserlands development along the river.

== Geography ==
The Killarney neighbourhood, which contains the area known as Champlain Heights, runs north from the Fraser River to its north border along East 41st Avenue and Kingsway, and stretches from Boundary Road, Vancouver's eastern border with Burnaby, British Columbia, to a line including Elliott Street and Vivian Drive on the western border. The neighbourhood is mostly built on the slope of the rise from the Fraser River, facing southward across Richmond, and is focused around Rupert Street (which merges with Kerr Street near 49th Avenue).

The neighbourhood contains a number of green spaces that are reflective of its history as one of the last areas to be developed in the Vancouver area.

== History ==
The Killarney area was one of the last portions of Vancouver to be developed, and was mostly second-growth forest until after World War II. Farms had been cut out of the forest since 1868, when William Rowling, a surveyor in the British military, was given a land grant that eventually consisted of much of southern Killarney, including all of its riverfront land. George Wales was the first to settle in northern Killarney in 1878, and eventually development began to move from the more populated areas to the west as the interurban streetcar line was constructed north of Kingsway.

After World War II, development accelerated with a growing need for housing, and the street grid moved south towards Southeast Marine Drive. In the 1970s, Champlain Heights was developed as a comprehensive residential development.

As a later developing neighbourhood, Killarney does not have the same level of heritage properties as other areas in Vancouver, though it does boast a number of examples of 1920s farmhouses and is well known for long-standing trees and natural heritage. The neighbourhood is named for Killarney, Ireland.

In the 1990s, the land along the Fraser River was a hotbed of development. Known as the Fraserlands, this area now boasts hundreds of townhome units and a number of residential highrise buildings in a new high density neighbourhood called the River District, with more presently under construction. The city of Vancouver has recently begun consultations on the possible development of a former log yard at the eastern end of the Fraserlands, with the intention of developing it into a sustainable community of its own.

== Demographics ==
Panethnic groups in the Killarney neighbourhood (2001−2016)
Panethnic group	2016		2006		2001	
Panethnic group	Pop.	%	Pop.	%	Pop.	%
East Asian (Note: Statistic includes total responses of "Chinese", "Korean", and "Japanese" under visible minority section on census.)	12,720	43.97%	13,345	49.71%	11,685	45.88%
European (Note: Statistic includes all persons that did not make up part of a visible minority or an indigenous identity.)	7,815	27.01%	8,595	32.02%	9,595	37.67%
Southeast Asian (Note: Statistic includes total responses of "Filipino" and "Southeast Asian" under visible minority section on census.)	3,530	12.2%	1,860	6.93%	1,220	4.79%
South Asian	2,170	7.5%	1,265	4.71%	1,490	5.85%
Latin American	685	2.37%	490	1.83%	515	2.02%
African	450	1.56%	290	1.08%	330	1.3%
Indigenous	425	1.47%	245	0.91%	240	0.94%
Middle Eastern (Note: Statistic includes total responses of "West Asian" and "Arab" under visible minority section on census.)	255	0.88%	330	1.23%	200	0.79%
Other/Multiracial (Note: Statistic includes total responses of "Visible minority, n.i.e." and "Multiple visible minorities" under visible minority section on census.)	890	3.08%	435	1.62%	185	0.73%
Total responses	28,930	98.65%	26,845	98.77%	25,470	98.78%
Total population	29,325	100%	27,180	100%	25,785	100%
Note: Totals greater than 100% due to multiple origin responses

== Features ==
Sculpture on the grounds of the Killarney Community Centre. The bird has since been removed.

Killarney is well populated with parks and green spaces, reflecting its forest history. The largest is Everett Crowley Park, along Kerr Street and north of Marine Drive; this park was originally a forested area with a ravine and waterfall that was used as a landfill for many years before being closed and reclaimed to its present form. Across Kerr is the Fraserview Golf Course, which also includes a number of trails. Killarney Park is now the location of Killarney Secondary School and a Community Centre, which features a swimming pool, is built on a reclaimed bog. There is also a Community Centre in Champlain Heights, near a commercial sector at the corner of East 54th and Kerr. A trail runs along the Fraser River through green space stretching along the riverfront. It also features a newly constructed Olympic ice rink for the 2010 Winter Olympics. The music video of Canadian singer Michael Bublé's song "Haven't Met You Yet" was shot in Killarney Market at the corner of East 49th Avenue and Elliott Street in Killarney. After 25 years as a family-owned grocer, Killarney Market was sold to another local independent retailer in 2018. The location is now known as 88 Supermarket.
