= Capilano Mall =

- Exterior of the mall in 2026
- Location: North Vancouver, British Columbia, Canada
- Coordinates: 49°19′18″N 123°6′1″W
- Address: 935 Marine Drive
- Opened: March 5, 1967; 59 years ago
- Manager: QuadReal Property Group
- Owner: bcIMC Realty Corporation
- Num. of stores: 90
- Num. of anchor tenants: 3
- Floor area: 37,237 square metres (400,820 sq ft)
- Floors: 1 (mall) (Former Sears 2 floors) (Office Building 4 floors) (Parkade 4 floors plus 1 underground)
- Website: capilanomall.com

Atrium

Food Court

Capilano Mall is a 37,000-square-metre (400,000 sq ft) shopping mall in the City of North Vancouver in British Columbia, Canada. It is located on Marine Drive, near the city's western border with the District of North Vancouver. It is the second largest shopping mall in the north shore, after Park Royal.

The anchor tenant is Walmart and Fairgrounds Public Racket Club.

== History ==
Capilano Mall was originally built in 1967. Woolworth's then Woolco and Super-Valu were the initial anchor tenants. In 1974 an expansion added a Sears store. The mall underwent an upgrade and major expansion in 1986, and again in 2001. The mall contains two totem poles constructed in 1986 by Nisga's sculptor Norman Tait and his family. The poles serve as a central feature, reflecting the site's historical and cultural connections to the local land.

== Transportation ==
Capilano Mall is served by frequent TransLink bus service along Marine Drive.

== Shop and Services ==
In addition to Walmart, shops include Urban Planet, Claire's, Dollar Tree, and Showcase. Food chains include A&W, Cobs Bread, and Subway.

== See also ==
- Park Royal Shopping Centre
- Lonsdale Quay
- List of shopping malls in Canada
